= Field hockey at the 2023 Pan American Games – Women's team rosters =

This article shows the rosters of all participating teams at the women's field hockey tournament at the 2023 Pan American Games in Santiago, Chile. Rosters can have a maximum of 16 athletes.

Age and caps as of 26 September 2023 and clubs for which they played in the 2023 season.

== Pool A ==
=== Argentina ===
The following 16 players were named in the Argentina squad, which was announced on 26 September 2023.

Head coach: Fernando Ferrara

| No. | Pos. | Player | Date of birth (age) | Caps | Goals | Club |
|---|---|---|---|---|---|---|
| 13 | GK | Cristina Cosentino | 22 December 1997 (age 28) | 29 | | (Argentine Football Association) Banco Nación |
| 14 | GK | Clara Barberi | 19 April 1992 (age 34) | 18 | | (Argentine Football Association) Lomas |
| 3 | DF | Agustina Gorzelany | 11 March 1996 (age 30) | 95 | 48 | (Argentine Football Association) San Martín |
| 4 | DF | Valentina Raposo | 28 January 2003 (age 23) | 35 | 4 | (Argentine Football Association) River Plate |
| 15 | DF | Juana Castellaro | 29 March 2005 (age 21) | 4 | 0 | (Argentine Football Association) River Plate |
| 32 | DF | Valentina Costa Biondi | 13 September 1995 (age 30) | 84 | 9 | (Argentine Football Association) San Fernando |
| 2 | MF | Sofía Toccalino | 20 March 1997 (age 29) | 148 | 11 | (Argentine Football Association) St. Catherine's |
| 5 | MF | Agostina Alonso | 1 October 1995 (age 30) | 136 | 7 | (Argentine Football Association) Banco Nación |
| 17 | MF | Rocío Sánchez Moccia | 2 August 1988 (age 37) | 302 | 20 | (Argentine Football Association) Puerto Nizuc |
| 18 | MF | Victoria Sauze | 21 July 1991 (age 34) | 131 | 2 | (Argentine Football Association) River Plate |
| 20 | MF | Sofía Cairó | 8 October 2002 (age 23) | 14 | 4 | (Argentine Football Association) Mariano Moreno |
| 10 | FW | María José Granatto | 21 April 1995 (age 31) | 184 | 92 | (Argentine Football Association) Santa Bárbara |
| 11 | FW | Delfina Thome | 10 September 1996 (age 29) | 48 | 12 | (Argentine Football Association) Liceo Rugby Club |
| 22 | FW | Eugenia Trinchinetti | 17 July 1997 (age 28) | 158 | 27 | (Argentine Football Association) San Fernando |
| 26 | FW | Pilar Campoy | 6 October 1990 (age 35) | 78 | 21 | (Argentine Football Association) Hacoaj |
| 28 | FW | Julieta Jankunas | 20 January 1999 (age 27) | 151 | 55 | (Argentine Football Association) Universitario de Córdoba |

=== Trinidad and Tobago ===
The following 16 players were named to the Trinidad and Tobago squad:

Head coach: Akim Toussaint

| No. | Pos. | Player | Date of birth (age) | Caps | Goals | Club |
|---|---|---|---|---|---|---|
| 1 | GK | Petal Derry | 18 September 1981 (age 44) | 47 | | |
| 30 | DF | Kayla Brathwaite | 30 January 1995 (age 31) | 40 | | |
| 4 | DF | Avion Ashton | 3 December 1988 (age 37) | 59 | | |
| 14 | DF | Zene Henry | 12 September 1994 (age 31) | 50 | | |
| 23 | DF | Savannah de Freitas | 17 April 1996 (age 30) | 34 | | |
| 9 | MF | Amanda George | 12 September 1992 (age 33) | 36 | | |
| 11 | MF | Alanna Lewis | 2 July 1988 (age 37) | 91 | | |
| 13 | MF | Giann Sealy | 16 May 1993 (age 33) | 35 | | |
| 15 | MF | Naomi Sampson | 7 February 2000 (age 26) | 15 | | |
| 17 | MF | Katherine Benjamin | 29 September 1993 (age 32) | 9 | | |
| 18 | MF | Daniella Cabralis | 31 October 1998 (age 27) | 13 | | |
| 99 | MF | Samantha Olton | 14 January 1999 (age 27) | 32 | | |
| 7 | FW | Shaniah de Freitas | 7 March 2000 (age 26) | 26 | | |
| 20 | FW | Gabrielle Thompson | 28 April 1997 (age 29) | 33 | | |
| 21 | FW | Kaitlyn Olton | 4 December 2001 (age 24) | 23 | | |
| 22 | FW | Robyn Dash | 25 May 2006 (age 20) | 5 | | |

=== Uruguay ===
The following 16 players were named to the Uruguay squad.

Head coach: Nicolás Tixe

| No. | Pos. | Player | Date of birth (age) | Caps | Goals | Club |
|---|---|---|---|---|---|---|
| 32 | GK | María Bate | 11 July 2000 (age 25) | 9 | 0 | (Uruguayan Football Association) Old Christians |
| 2 | DF | Florencia Peñalba | 9 September 1999 (age 26) | 14 | 0 | (Uruguayan Football Association) Carrasco Polo Club |
| 14 | DF | Magdalena Gómez | 14 February 1996 (age 30) | 16 | 2 | (Argentine Football Association) San Lorenzo |
| 15 | DF | Jimena García | 27 July 1999 (age 26) | 31 | 5 | (Uruguayan Football Association) Club Náutico |
| 19 | DF | María Barreiro | 8 December 1999 (age 26) | 12 | 3 | (Uruguayan Football Association) Old Girls |
| 27 | DF | Manuela Quiñones | 2 April 2001 (age 25) | 2 | 0 | (Uruguayan Football Association) Old Sampa |
| 6 | MF | Camila de María | 30 April 1991 (age 35) | 18 | 1 | (Uruguayan Football Association) Club Náutico |
| 7 | MF | Constanza Barrandeguy (Captain) | 7 April 1996 (age 30) | 57 | 17 | (Uruguayan Football Association) Old Woodlands |
| 10 | MF | Manuela Vilar (Captain) | 25 March 1994 (age 32) | 89 | 75 | (Royal Belgian Football Association) Dragons |
| 11 | MF | Sol Amadeo | 30 May 1996 (age 30) | 33 | 9 | (Uruguayan Football Association) Carrasco Polo Club |
| 13 | MF | Guadalupe Curutchague | 5 June 2003 (age 23) | 7 | 2 | (Uruguayan Football Association) Club Náutico |
| 28 | MF | Kaisuami Dall'Orso | 1 June 1993 (age 33) | 71 | 18 | (Uruguayan Football Association) Carrasco Polo Club |
| 3 | FW | Agustina Taborda | 4 December 1994 (age 31) | 40 | 18 | (Uruguayan Football Association) Club Náutico |
| 4 | FW | Elisa Civetta | 2 January 2003 (age 23) | 2 | 0 | (Uruguayan Football Association) Old Girls |
| 9 | FW | Milagros Algorta | 11 April 1997 (age 29) | 45 | 34 | (Uruguayan Football Association) Old Girls |
| 17 | MF | Teresa Viana (Captain) | 26 March 1993 (age 33) | 54 | 60 | (Royal Belgian Football Association) Dragons |

=== United States ===
The following 16 players were named in the United States squad, which was announced on 19 September 2023.

Head coach: (Republic of Ireland) David Passmore

| No. | Pos. | Player | Date of birth (age) | Caps | Goals | Club |
|---|---|---|---|---|---|---|
| 31 | GK | Kelsey Bing | 1 October 1997 (age 28) | 62 | 0 | |
| 2 | DF | Meredith Sholder | 27 February 1999 (age 27) | 23 | 0 | |
| 7 | DF | Jillian Wolgemuth | 28 April 1998 (age 28) | 40 | 0 | |
| 13 | DF | Ashley Hoffman | 8 November 1996 (age 29) | 104 | 19 | |
| 20 | DF | Leah Crouse | 22 February 2000 (age 26) | 22 | 2 | |
| 21 | DF | Alexandra Hammel | 16 June 1996 (age 29) | 43 | 1 | |
| 3 | MF | Ashley Sessa | 23 June 2004 (age 21) | 26 | 5 | |
| 9 | MF | Madeleine Zimmer | 28 September 2001 (age 24) | 28 | 1 | |
| 12 | MF | Amanda Golini (Captain) | 28 March 1995 (age 31) | 127 | 13 | |
| 16 | MF | Linnea Gonzales | 15 August 1997 (age 28) | 41 | 3 | |
| 25 | MF | Karlie Kisha | 25 September 1995 (age 30) | 46 | 1 | |
| 27 | MF | Emma DeBerdine | 14 June 2001 (age 24) | 17 | 0 | |
| 1 | FW | Abigail Tamer | 9 July 2003 (age 22) | 10 | 2 | |
| 4 | FW | Danielle Grega | 2 July 1996 (age 29) | 70 | 21 | |
| 15 | FW | Sanne Caarls | 16 March 1998 (age 28) | 28 | 4 | |
| 17 | FW | Elizabeth Yeager | 17 June 2003 (age 22) | 29 | 5 | |

== Pool B ==
=== Canada ===
The following 16 players were named in the Canada squad, which was announced on 26 September 2023.

Head coach: (England) Daniel Kerry

| No. | Pos. | Player | Date of birth (age) | Caps | Goals | Club |
|---|---|---|---|---|---|---|
| 31 | GK | Rowan Harris | 11 August 1996 (age 29) | 60 | 0 | |
| 8 | DF | Elise Wong | 21 January 1998 (age 28) | 34 | 8 | |
| 10 | DF | Kathleen Leahy | 29 October 1993 (age 32) | 78 | 4 | |
| 14 | DF | Karli Johansen | 26 March 1992 (age 34) | 164 | 71 | |
| 17 | DF | Sara McManus | 14 August 1993 (age 32) | 206 | 65 | |
| 19 | DF | Audrey Sawers | 22 November 1999 (age 26) | 20 | 0 | |
| 3 | MF | Thora Rae | 15 October 1999 (age 26) | 20 | 4 | |
| 4 | MF | Melanie Scholz | 15 July 2000 (age 25) | 7 | 0 | |
| 7 | MF | Anna Mollenhauer | 18 September 1999 (age 26) | 39 | 1 | |
| 11 | MF | Kenzie Girgis | 10 June 2004 (age 21) | 2 | 0 | |
| 12 | MF | Sara Goodman | 22 October 1999 (age 26) | 31 | 0 | |
| 16 | MF | Natalie Sourisseau (Captain) | 5 December 1992 (age 33) | 169 | 20 | |
| 2 | FW | Chloe Walton | 28 April 2000 (age 26) | 8 | 1 | |
| 6 | FW | Jordyn Faiczak | 2 April 1999 (age 27) | 41 | 12 | |
| 9 | FW | Madison Thompson | 11 August 1994 (age 31) | 20 | 5 | |
| 28 | FW | Samantha McCrory | 30 April 2000 (age 26) | 16 | 13 | |

=== Chile ===
The following 16 players were named in the Chile squad, which was announced on 14 September 2023.

Head coach: (Argentina) Sergio Vigil

| No. | Pos. | Player | Date of birth (age) | Caps | Goals | Club |
|---|---|---|---|---|---|---|
| 28 | GK | Natalia Salvador | 28 September 1993 (age 32) | 70 | 0 | (Football Federation of Chile) Universidad Católica |
| 3 | DF | Fernanda Villagrán | 12 August 1997 (age 28) | 95 | 25 | (Football Federation of Chile) Club Manquehue |
| 4 | DF | Doménica Ananías | 18 August 1998 (age 27) | 54 | 2 | (Football Federation of Chile) Club Manquehue |
| 6 | DF | Fernanda Flores | 14 September 1993 (age 32) | 194 | 7 | (Football Federation of Chile) Universidad Católica |
| 13 | DF | Camila Caram (Captain) | 22 April 1989 (age 37) | 261 | 84 | (Football Federation of Chile) Prince of Wales Country Club |
| 36 | DF | Antonia Morales | 31 July 1997 (age 28) | 3 | 0 | (Football Federation of Chile) Prince of Wales Country Club |
| 5 | MF | Denise Rojas | 4 July 1995 (age 30) | 178 | 57 | (German Football Association) Harvestehuder |
| 7 | MF | Sofía Filipek | 9 August 1994 (age 31) | 165 | 27 | (Football Federation of Chile) COGS |
| 19 | MF | Agustina Solano | 5 April 1995 (age 31) | 84 | 3 | (Football Federation of Chile) Universidad Católica |
| 21 | MF | Francisca Irazoqui | 4 December 2003 (age 22) | 8 | 0 | (Football Federation of Chile) Prince of Wales Country Club |
| 22 | MF | Paula Valdivia | 5 June 1997 (age 29) | 57 | 8 | (Football Federation of Chile) Club Manquehue |
| 10 | FW | Manuela Urroz | 24 September 1991 (age 34) | 226 | 103 | (Royal Belgian Football Association) Royal Antwerp |
| 14 | FW | Francisca Tala | 20 October 1994 (age 31) | 147 | 38 | (Football Federation of Chile) Alumni |
| 25 | FW | María Maldonado | 13 August 1997 (age 28) | 82 | 25 | (Football Federation of Chile) Prince of Wales Country Club |
| 29 | FW | Simone Avelli | 6 May 2000 (age 26) | 4 | 1 | (Football Federation of Chile) Prince of Wales Country Club |
| 47 | FW | Laura Müller | 22 September 2005 (age 20) | 3 | 0 | (Football Federation of Chile) Club Manquehue |

=== Cuba ===
The following 16 players were named in the Cuba squad.

Head coach:

| No. | Pos. | Player | Date of birth (age) | Caps | Goals | Club |
|---|---|---|---|---|---|---|
| 1 | GK | Yurismakis García (Captain) | 26 April 1998 (age 28) | 10 | | |
| 2 | GK | Marbelis Torres | 3 March 1992 (age 34) | 2 | | |
| 4 | DF | Sunaylis Nikle | 13 March 1994 (age 32) | 40 | | |
| 8 | DF | Arlettis Tirse | 24 February 1994 (age 32) | 17 | | |
| 13 | DF | Yuraima Vera | 15 June 1990 (age 35) | 44 | | |
| 3 | MF | Tahimi Licea | 22 February 1991 (age 35) | 33 | | |
| 6 | MF | Yakira Guillén | 29 November 1996 (age 29) | 8 | | |
| 9 | MF | Alexyane Ramírez | 3 October 1996 (age 29) | 10 | | |
| 11 | MF | Helec Carta (Captain) | 23 February 1993 (age 33) | 38 | | |
| 12 | MF | Yunia Milanés (Captain) | 16 July 1995 (age 30) | 15 | | |
| 17 | MF | Meily Cots | 8 March 1994 (age 32) | 15 | | |
| 5 | FW | Lismary González | 1 January 2000 (age 26) | 8 | | |
| 7 | FW | Suramis Cordero | 21 June 2000 (age 25) | 10 | | |
| 10 | FW | Cheila Darias | 9 August 2003 (age 22) | 10 | | |
| 15 | FW | Jennifer Martínez | 18 May 2000 (age 26) | 21 | | |
| 16 | FW | Geidy Morales | 8 September 2000 (age 25) | 10 | | |

=== Mexico ===
The following 17 players were named in the Mexico squad.

Head coach:

| No. | Pos. | Player | Date of birth (age) | Caps | Goals | Club |
|---|---|---|---|---|---|---|
| 1 | GK | Jesús Castillo | 25 December 1987 (age 38) | 110 | | |
| 11 | GK | María Pérez | 3 January 2001 (age 25) | 1 | | |
| 16 | DF | Fernanda Oviedo (Captain) | 28 February 1996 (age 30) | 93 | | |
| 14 | DF | Marlet Correa | 25 December 1993 (age 32) | 95 | | |
| 21 | DF | Katerine Rivera | 10 February 1997 (age 29) | 15 | | |
| 4 | MF | Maribel Acosta (Captain) | 10 December 1994 (age 31) | 85 | | |
| 8 | MF | Mitzi Aguilera (Captain) | 21 August 1985 (age 40) | 14 | | |
| 10 | MF | Michel Navarro | 7 May 1988 (age 38) | 106 | | |
| 15 | MF | Arlette Estrada | 8 June 1999 (age 26) | 61 | | |
| 17 | MF | Nathalia Nava | 20 February 1998 (age 28) | 46 | | |
| 19 | MF | Grecia Mendoza | 28 January 2002 (age 24) | 19 | | |
| 7 | FW | Dariana Cardiel | 7 May 2003 (age 23) | 25 | | |
| 9 | FW | Dayana Cuevas | 8 January 2000 (age 26) | 19 | | |
| 12 | FW | Naomi Cardiel | 9 September 2001 (age 24) | 25 | | |
| 13 | FW | Valeria Espinoza | 1 August 2004 (age 21) | 20 | | |
| 20 | FW | Sofía Pérez | 11 February 2003 (age 23) | 20 | | |
| 29 | FW | Itzel García | 14 March 2003 (age 23) | 14 | | |
