= Field hockey at the 2023 Pan American Games =

- Field hockey pictogram
- Venue: Field Hockey Training Center
- Start date: October 25, 2023
- End date: November 4, 2023
- No. of events: 2 (1 men, 1 women)
- Competitors: 256 from 10 nations

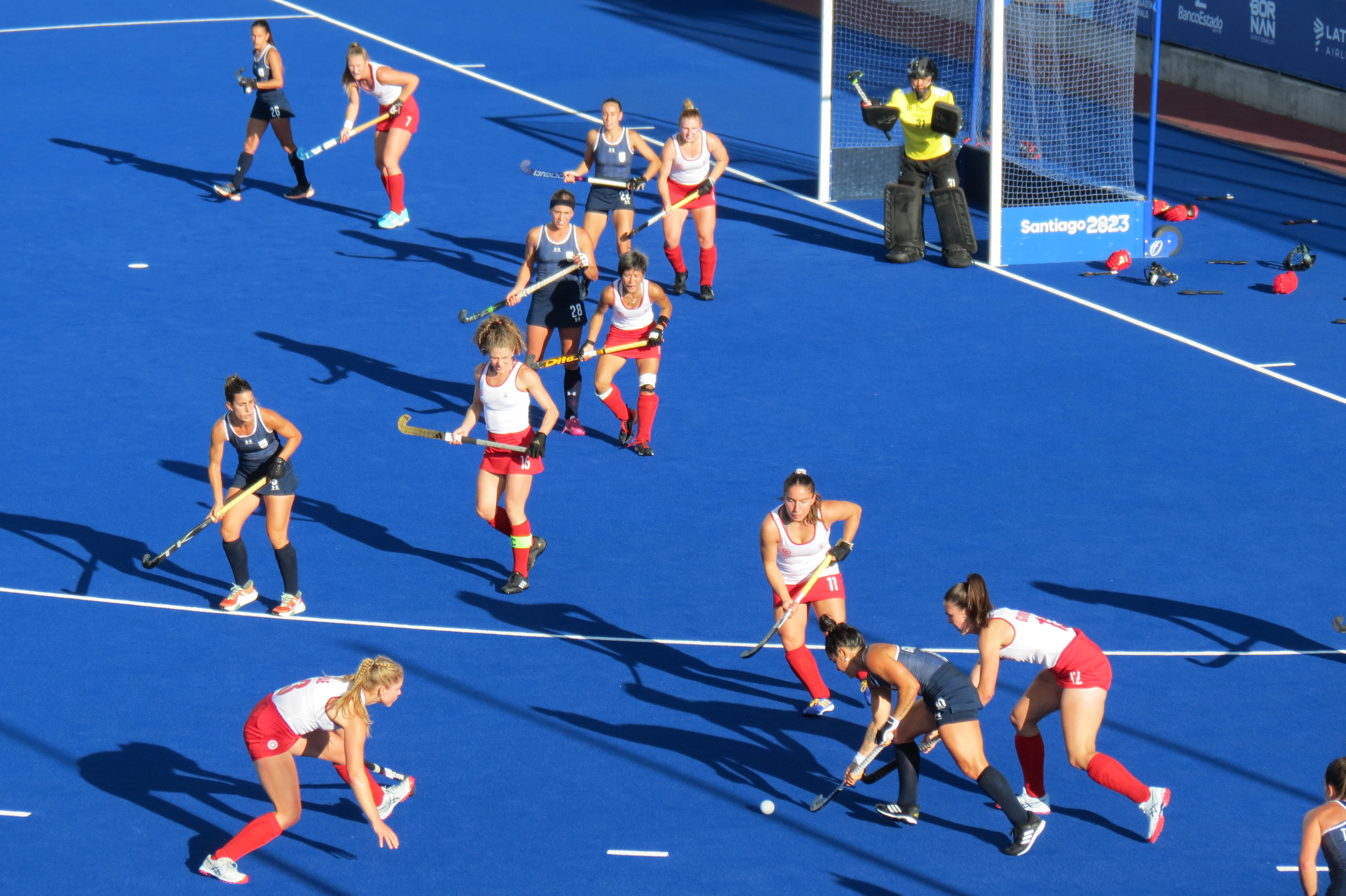
Argentina vs Canada women's field hockey match

Field hockey competitions at the 2023 Pan American Games in Santiago, Chile were scheduled to be held from 25 October to 4 November 2023. It was the fifteenth edition of the field hockey event at the Pan American Games. A total of eight men's and eight women's teams (each consisting up to 16 athletes each) competed in each tournament. The games were played at the Field Hockey Training Center, located in the National Stadium Park cluster in Santiago.

The winner of each tournament qualified for the 2024 Summer Olympics in Paris, France.

== Qualification ==
A total of eight men's and women's teams qualified for the tournament. The hosts country Chile received automatic qualification in both tournaments. The top two teams at the 2023 Central American and Caribbean Games and 2022 South American Games also qualified. The top three teams not yet qualified from the 2022 Men's and Women's Pan American Cup (after the results from the above two tournaments are taken into account) also qualified. If the Canada and/or the United States have not qualified still, a playoff between the nations and the third ranked at the Pan American Cups will take place. If both nations do qualify, the playoff will be not necessary and the next best placed team at each Pan American Cup (that has not already qualified) will qualify.

=== Summary ===
Nation	Men's	Women's	Athletes
Argentina	Yes	Yes	32
Brazil	Yes		16
Canada	Yes	Yes	32
Chile	Yes	Yes	32
Cuba		Yes	16
Mexico	Yes	Yes	32
Peru	Yes		16
Trinidad and Tobago	Yes	Yes	32
United States	Yes	Yes	32
Uruguay		Yes	16
Total: 10 NOCs	8	8	256

=== Men's qualification ===
Qualification	Date	Host	Quota(s)	Qualified team
Host country	—N/a		~~1~~	—N/a
2022 Pan American Cup	20–30 January	(Chile) Santiago	~~2~~ 4	Canada; United States; Brazil; Peru
2022 South American Games	3–11 October	(Paraguay) Asunción	2	Argentina; Chile
2023 Central American and Caribbean Games	28 June – 6 July	(Dominican Republic) Santo Domingo	2	Mexico; Trinidad and Tobago
Total			8	

- Chile finished in the top two at the 2022 South American Games, meaning the host nation quota was reallocated as an additional quota through the 2022 Pan American Cup.
- Since Canada and the USA qualified through the Pan American Cup, an additional spot was available through the event.

=== Women's qualification ===
Qualification	Date	Host	Quota(s)	Qualified team
Host country	—N/a		~~1~~	—N/a
2022 Pan American Cup	19–29 January	(Chile) Santiago	~~2~~ 4	Canada; United States; Uruguay; Trinidad and Tobago
2022 South American Games	4–12 October	(Paraguay) Asunción	2	Chile; Argentina
2023 Central American and Caribbean Games	27 June – 5 July	(Dominican Republic) Santo Domingo	2	Mexico; Cuba
Total			8	

- Chile finished in the top two at the 2022 South American Games, meaning the host nation quota was reallocated as an additional quota through the 2022 Pan American Cup.
- Since Canada and the USA qualified through the Pan American Cup, an additional spot was available through the event.

== Medal summary ==
=== Medal table ===
* Host nation (Chile)

Rank	Nation	Gold	Silver	Bronze	Total
1	Argentina	2	0	0	2
2	Chile*	0	1	1	2
3	United States	0	1	0	1
4	Canada	0	0	1	1
Totals (4 entries)		2	2	2	6

=== Medalists ===
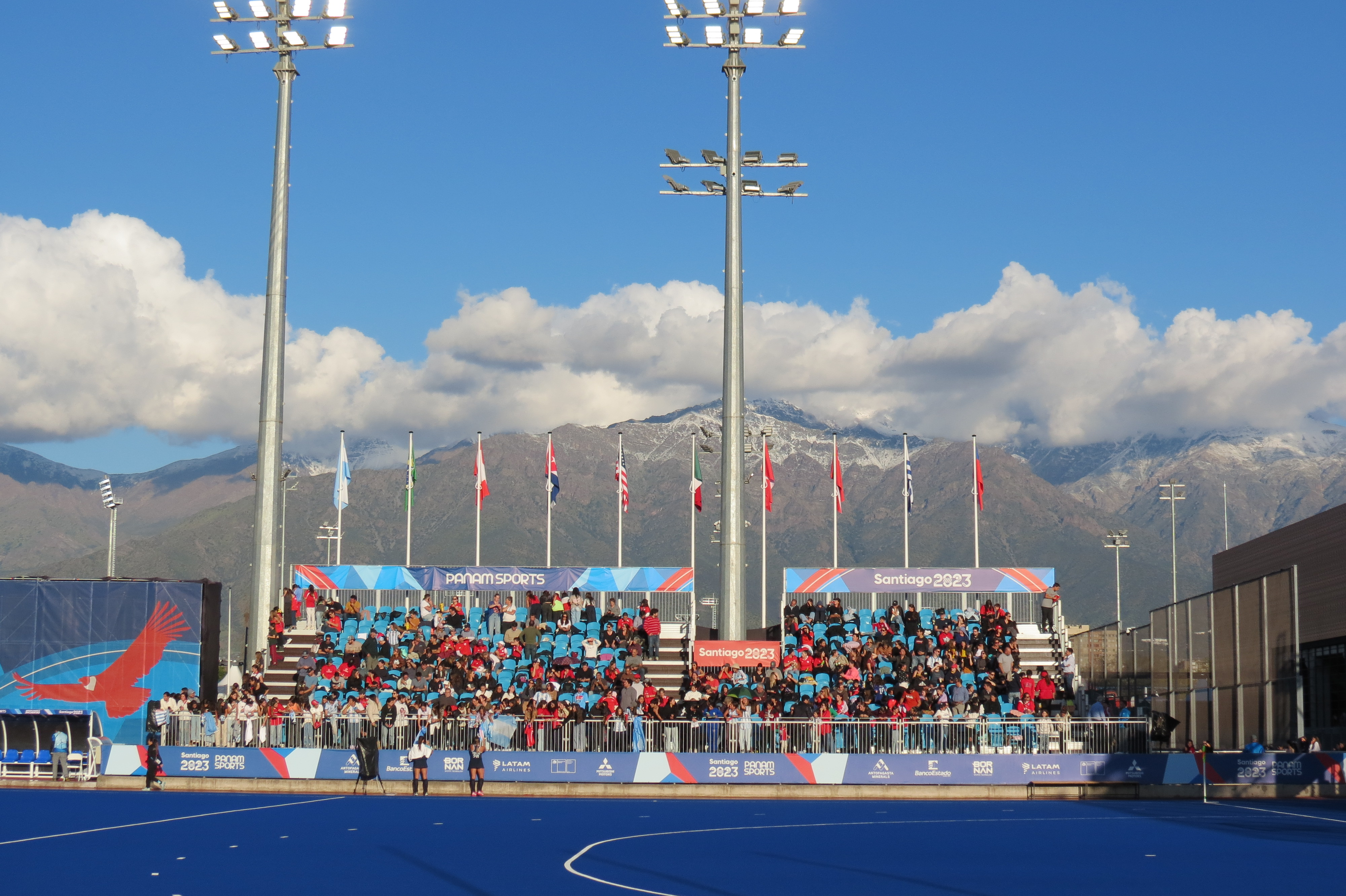
The field hockey venue during the competition

Event	Gold	Silver	Bronze
Men's tournament	Argentina; Tomás Santiago; Agustin Machelett; Juan Catan; Nicolás Keenan; Maico Casella; Lucas Toscani; Nicolás Della Torre; Santiago Tarazona; Federico Monja; Tomas Domene; Matías Rey; Lucas Martínez; Agustín Mazzilli; Tadeo Marcucci; Thomas Habif; Agustín Bugallo	Chile; Adrian Henriquez; Vicente Goni; Fernando Renz; José Maldonado; Martín Rodriguez; Kay Gesswein; Andrés Pizarro; Juan Amoroso; Jose Hurtado; Felipe Renz; Raimundo Valenzuela; Axel Richter; Axel Troncoso; Sebastián Wolansky; Nils Strabucchi; Franco Becerra	Canada; Floris van Son; Devohn Noronha Teixeira; Oliver Scholfield; Keegan Pereira; Balraj Panesar; Brendan Guraliuk; Sean Davis; Gordon Johnston; Brenden Bissett; Fin Boothroyd; Matthew Sarmento; James Kirkpatrick; Samuel Cabral; Taylor Curran; Ethan McTavish; Thomson Harris
Women's tournament	Argentina; Agostina Alonso; Clara Barberi; Sofía Cairó; Juana Castellaro; Pilar Campoy; Cristina Cosentino; Valentina Costa Biondi; Agustina Gorzelany; María José Granatto; Julieta Jankunas; Valentina Raposo; Rocío Sánchez Moccia; Victoria Sauze; Delfina Thome; Sofia Toccalino; Eugenia Trinchinetti	United States; Kelsey Bing; Sanne Caarls; Leah Crouse; Emma DeBerdine; Amanda Golini; Linnea Gonzales; Danielle Grega; Alexandra Hammel; Ashley Hoffman; Karlie Kisha; Ashley Sessa; Meredith Sholder; Abigail Tamer; Jillian Wolgemuth; Elizabeth Yeager; Madeleine Zimmer	Chile; Doménica Ananías; Simone Avelli; Camila Caram; Sofía Filipek; Fernanda Flores; Francisca Irazoqui; María Maldonado; Antonia Morales; Laura Müller; Denise Rojas; Natalia Salvador; Agustina Solano; Francisca Tala; Manuela Urroz; Paula Valdivia; Fernanda Villagrán

== See also ==
- Field hockey at the 2024 Summer Olympics
