= 2026 Women's FIH Hockey World Cup Qualifiers =

Field hockey tournament

Tournament details
- Host countries: Chile; India
- Dates: 2–14 March 2026
- Teams: 16 (from 4 confederations)
- Venue: 2 (in 2 host cities)

The 2026 Women's FIH Hockey World Cup Qualifiers was the final stage of the qualification for the 2026 Women's FIH Hockey World Cup. It was held from 2 to 14 March 2026.

Two events were held, one each in Santiago, Chile and Hyderabad, India

== Format ==
Teams not qualifying from the continental qualification tournament were participating in this tournament according to the respective spots received by the FIH. The 16 teams were split into two eight team tournaments. In each tournament the eight teams were divided into two four-team pools. After the round-robin stage the top two teams advanced to the semifinals. The top three teams of each tournament and the highest world ranked team that finishes in fourth place in each event qualified for the World Cup.

== Entrants ==
Qualification	Date	Host	Berths	Qualified team
2025 Pan American Cup	24 July–3 August 2025	(Uruguay) Montevideo	3	Canada; Chile; Uruguay
2025 EuroHockey Championship II	27 July–2 August 2025	(Poland) Gniezno	4	Austria; Italy; Switzerland; Wales
2025 EuroHockey Championship	8–17 August 2025	(Germany) Mönchengladbach	4	England; France; Ireland; Scotland
2025 Oceania Cup	4–7 September 2025	(Australia) Darwin	1	Australia
2025 Asia Cup	5−14 September 2025	(China) Hangzhou	4	India; Japan; Malaysia; South Korea
Total			16	

== Santiago ==
2026 Women's FIH World Cup Qualifiers Chile
Tournament details
- Host country: Chile
- City: Santiago
- Dates: 2–8 March
- Teams: 8 (from 4 confederations)
- Venue: Estadio Nacional del Hockey Césped Claudia Schüler

Final positions
- Champions: Chile
- Runner-up: Australia
- Third place: Ireland

Tournament statistics
- Matches played: 20
- Goals scored: 66 (3.3 per match)
- Top scorer(s): (Australia) Neasa Flynn (France) Emma van der Zanden (Ireland) Caoimhe Perdue (Malaysia) Nur Azhar (3 goals)
- Best player: (Ireland) Niamh Carey
- Best young player: (France) Mathilde Duffrène
- Best goalkeeper: (Chile) Natalia Salvador

The tournament was held at the Estadio Nacional del Hockey Césped Claudia Schüler in Santiago, Chile from 2 to 8 March 2026.

=== Preliminary round ===
All times are local (UTC−3).

==== Pool A ====
Pos	Team	Pld	W	D	L	GF	GA	GD	Pts	Qualification
1	Chile (H)	3	3	0	0	9	1	+8	9	Semi-finals
2	Australia	3	2	0	1	8	2	+6	6	Semi-finals
3	France	3	1	0	2	2	6	−4	3	Classification round
4	Switzerland	3	0	0	3	1	11	−10	0	Classification round

Updated to match(es) played on 5 March 2026. Source: FIH
Rules for classification: 1) points; 2) matches won; 3) goal difference; 4) goals for; 5) head-to-head result; 6) field goals for.
(H) Hosts

2 March 2026
17:15

Australia	4–0	France
Flynn 7'; G. Stewart 19'; Kershaw 23'; Arnott 28'	Report

Umpires:
Victoria Pazos (PAR)
Ilanggo Kanabathu (MAS)

2 March 2026
19:30

Chile	6–0	Switzerland
Urroz 20', 20'; Maldonado 26'; Rojas 42'; Arrieta 44'; Villagrán 48'	Report

Umpires:
Lorijn de Kraker (NED)
Juan Pedro Rodríguez (ARG)

4 March 2026
13:30

France	2–1	Switzerland
Lahlah 12'; Le Nindre 37'	Report	Weber 16'

Umpires:
Lorijn de Kraker (NED)
Kamile Mockaitytė (LTU)

4 March 2026
15:45

Chile	2–1	Australia
Salas 42'; Maldonado 60+'	Report	Kershaw 46'

Umpires:
Liu Xiaoying (CHN)
Victoria Pazos (PAR)

5 March 2026
17:15

Australia	3–0	Switzerland
Flynn 8', 51'; Howell 56'	Report

Umpires:
Kamile Mockaitytė (LTU)
Tyler Klenk (CAN)

5 March 2026
19:30

France	0–1	Chile
	Report	Salas 8'

Umpires:
Liu Xiaoying (CHN)
Lorijn de Kraker (NED

==== Pool B ====
Pos	Team	Pld	W	D	L	GF	GA	GD	Pts	Qualification
1	Ireland	3	3	0	0	12	2	+10	9	Semi-finals
2	Japan	3	2	0	1	9	2	+7	6	Semi-finals
3	Malaysia	3	1	0	2	6	10	−4	3	Classification round
4	Canada	3	0	0	3	2	15	−13	0	Classification round

Source: FIH
Rules for classification: 1) points; 2) matches won; 3) goal difference; 4) goals for; 5) head-to-head result; 6) field goals for.

2 March 2026
12:45

Japan	4–0	Canada
Nakagomi 5'; Hasegawa 37'; S. Tanaka 39'; Mikami 53'	Report

Umpires:
Kamilė Mockaitytė (LTU)
James Unkles (AUS)

2 March 2026
15:00

Ireland	5–0	Malaysia
Mullan 21'; Perdue 24'; McAuley 34'; M. Carey 37'; Upton 40'	Report

Umpires:
You Hyo-sik (KOR)
Jamie Telfer (SCO)

3 March 2026
13:30

Canada	1–6	Malaysia
Walton 11'	Report	K. Mohd 9'; Azhar 20', 28'; Muhammad 36'; Zulkifli 39'; Sukri 46'

Umpires:
Kelly Hudson (NZL)
Lorijn de Kraker (NED)

3 March 2026
15:45

Ireland	2–1	Japan
N. Carey 18'; Perdue 29'	Report	Toriyama 55'

Umpires:
Maggie Giddens (USA)
Kamile Mockaitytė (LTU)

5 March 2026
12:45

Japan	4–0	Malaysia
Kobayakawa 39', 45'; Murayama 48'; Nakagomi 55'	Report

Umpires:
Kelly Hudson (NZL)
Laurine Delforge (BEL)

5 March 2026
15:00

Canada	1–5	Ireland
Mollenhauer 13'	Report	Torrans 25', 36'; Perdue 30'; McMaster 38'; Handcock 60'

Umpires:
Maggie Giddens (USA)
Victoria Pazos (PAR)

=== Classification round ===
Crossover
7 March
France	3
Canada	0
7 March
Malaysia	3
Switzerland	1

Fifth place
8 March
France	3
Malaysia	0
Seventh place
8 March
Canada	1
Switzerland	2

==== Crossovers ====
7 March 2026
09:00

France	3–0	Canada
Van der Zanden 34'; Duffrène 37'; Varoqui 51'	Report

Umpires:
Lorijn de Kraker (NED)
Kamilė Mockaitytė (LTU)

7 March 2026
11:15

Malaysia	3–1	Switzerland
S. Mohd 25'; Sukri 26'; Azhar 37'	Report	Stomps 43'

Umpires:
Juan Pedro Rodríguez (ARG)
Jamie Telfer (SCO)

==== Seventh and eighth place ====
8 March 2026
09:00

Canada	1–2	Switzerland
Girgis 33'	Report	Pöhler 25'; E. Trösch 36'

Umpires:
Lorijn de Kraker (NED)
Juan Pedro Rodríguez (ARG)

==== Fifth and sixth place ====
8 March 2026
11:15

France	3–0	Malaysia
Van der Zanden 1', 57'; Proux 37'	Report

Umpires:
Kamilė Mockaitytė (LTU)
Tyler Klenk (CAN)

=== Medal round ===
Semi-finals
7 March
Chile (p.s.o.)	1 (2)
Japan	1 (0)
7 March
Ireland	0
Australia	1

Final
8 March
Chile	1
Australia	0
Third place
8 March
Japan	0 (1)
Ireland (p.s.o.)	0 (3)

==== Semi-finals ====
7 March 2026
18:00

Ireland	0–1	Australia
	Report	Colwill 28'

Umpires:
Laurine Delforge (BEL)
Liu Xiaoying (CHN)

7 March 2026
20:15

Chile	1–1	Japan
Ananías 59'	Report	Saito 14'
Penalties
Muñoz (penalty shoot-out missed); Ananías (penalty shoot-out scored); Valdivia (penalty shoot-out missed); Urroz (penalty shoot-out scored)	2–0	(penalty shoot-out missed) Kobayakawa; (penalty shoot-out missed) Nakagomi; (penalty shoot-out missed) Tanaka; (penalty shoot-out missed) Hasegawa

Umpires:
Kelly Hudson (NZL)
Maggie Giddens (USA)

==== Third and fourth place ====
8 March 2026
18:00

Japan	0–0	Ireland
	Report
Penalties
Kobayakawa (penalty shoot-out scored); Hasegawa (penalty shoot-out missed); Toriyama (penalty shoot-out missed); Nakagomi (penalty shoot-out missed)	1–3	(penalty shoot-out scored) Hawkshaw; (penalty shoot-out scored) McLoughlin; (penalty shoot-out missed) Kealy; (penalty shoot-out scored) McMaster

Umpires:
Victoria Pazos (PAR)
Maggie Giddens (USA)

==== Final ====
8 March 2026
20:15

Chile	1–0	Australia
A. Irazoqui 7'	Report

Umpires:
Kelly Hudson (NZL)
Liu Xiaoying (CHN)

=== Goalscorers ===
There were 66 goals scored in 20 matches, for an average of 3.3 goals per match.

3 goals

- (Australia) Neasa Flynn
- (France) Emma van der Zanden
- (Ireland) Caoimhe Perdue
- (Malaysia) Nur Azhar

2 goals

- (Australia) Stephanie Kershaw
- (Chile) María Maldonado
- (Chile) Josefa Salas
- (Chile) Manuela Urroz
- (Ireland) Sarah Torrans
- (Japan) Shiho Kobayakawa
- (Japan) Akari Nakagomi
- (Malaysia) Fatin Sukri

1 goal

- (Australia) Alice Arnott
- (Australia) Claire Colwill
- (Australia) Mihaylia Howell
- (Australia) Grace Stewart
- (Canada) Anna Mollenhauer
- (Canada) Kenzie Girgis
- (Canada) Chloe Walton
- (Chile) Doménica Ananías
- (Chile) Fernanda Arrieta
- (Chile) Antonia Irazoqui
- (Chile) Denise Rojas
- (Chile) Fernanda Villagrán
- (France) Mathilde Duffrene
- (France) Mickaela Lahlah
- (France) Paola Le Nindre
- (France) Mazarine Proux
- (France) Pauline Varoqui
- (Ireland) Michelle Carey
- (Ireland) Niamh Carey
- (Ireland) Sarah McAuley
- (Ireland) Amy Handcock
- (Ireland) Jessica McMaster
- (Ireland) Kathryn Mullan
- (Ireland) Róisín Upton
- (Japan) Miyu Hasegawa
- (Japan) Maiko Mikami
- (Japan) Hiroka Murayama
- (Japan) Hanami Saito
- (Japan) Saki Tanaka
- (Japan) Mai Toriyama
- (Malaysia) Khairunnisa Mohd
- (Malaysia) Siti Mohd
- (Malaysia) Zati Muhammad
- (Malaysia) Nuramirah Zulkifli
- (Switzerland) Nele Pöhler
- (Switzerland) Elena Trösch
- (Switzerland) Sofie Stomps
- (Switzerland) Stephanie Weber

Source: FIH

=== Final standings ===
Pos	Team	Qualification
1	Chile (H)	2026 Women's FIH Hockey World Cup
2	Australia	2026 Women's FIH Hockey World Cup
3	Ireland	2026 Women's FIH Hockey World Cup
4	Japan	2026 Women's FIH Hockey World Cup
5	France	
6	Malaysia	
7	Switzerland	
8	Canada	

Source: FIH
(H) Host

== Hyderabad ==
2026 Women's FIH World Cup Qualifiers India
Tournament details
- Host country: India
- City: Hyderabad
- Dates: 8–14 March
- Teams: 8 (from 3 confederations)
- Venue: G. M. C. Balayogi Hockey Ground

Final positions
- Champions: England
- Runner-up: India
- Third place: Scotland

Tournament statistics
- Matches played: 20
- Goals scored: 58 (2.9 per match)
- Top scorer(s): (England) Grace Balsdon (Uruguay) Teresa Viana (5 goals)

The tournament was held at the G. M. C. Balayogi Hockey Ground in Hyderabad, India from 8 to 14 March 2026.

=== Preliminary round ===
All times are local (UTC+5:30).

==== Pool A ====
Pos	Team	Pld	W	D	L	GF	GA	GD	Pts	Qualification
1	England	3	3	0	0	10	2	+8	9	Semi-finals
2	Italy	3	1	1	1	6	6	0	4	Semi-finals
3	South Korea	3	1	1	1	2	4	−2	4	Classification round
4	Austria	3	0	0	3	0	6	−6	0	Classification round

Source: FIH
Rules for classification: 1) points; 2) matches won; 3) goal difference; 4) goals for; 5) head-to-head result; 6) field goals for.

8 March 2026
12:45

England	5–2	Italy
Balsdon 12', 32'; Bingham 15'; Neal 16'; Toman 27'	Report	Pessina 19'; Carta 46'

Umpires:
Cookie Tan (SGP)
Tamara Wood (AUS)

8 March 2026
15:00

South Korea	1–0	Austria
Kim S. 34'	Report

Umpires:
Durga Devi (IND)
Lizelotte Wolter (NED)

9 March 2026
12:45

Italy	3–0	Austria
Carta 19'; Brea 21'; Di Paola 45'	Report

Umpires:
Benjamin Messerli (SUI)
Rama Potnis (IND)

9 March 2026
15:00

South Korea	0–3	England
	Report	Walker 16'; Neal 38'; Balsdon 44'

Umpires:
Michael Dutrieux (BEL)
Gemma Calderón (ESP)

11 March 2026
12:45

England	2–0	Austria
Balsdon 20'; Hunt 48'	Report

Umpires:
Sandra Adell (ESP)
Durga Devi (IND)

11 March 2026
15:00

Italy	1–1	South Korea
Carta 7'	Report	Choi J. 26'

Umpires:
Wanri Venter (RSA)
Rama Potnis (IND)

==== Pool B ====
Pos	Team	Pld	W	D	L	GF	GA	GD	Pts	Qualification
1	India (H)	3	2	1	0	10	3	+7	7	Semi-finals
2	Scotland	3	2	1	0	6	3	+3	7	Semi-finals
3	Uruguay	3	1	0	2	4	9	−5	3	Classification round
4	Wales	3	0	0	3	3	8	−5	0	Classification round

Source: FIH
Rules for classification: 1) points; 2) matches won; 3) goal difference; 4) goals for; 5) head-to-head result; 6) field goals for.
(H) Hosts

8 March 2026
17:15

Scotland	1–0	Wales
Costello 20'	Report

Umpires:
Kim Yoon-seon (KOR)
Pauline Cuypers (BEL)

8 March 2026
19:30

India	4–0	Uruguay
Toppo 21'; Ishika 40'; Lalremsiami 49'; Rutuja 58'	Report

Umpires:
Wanri Venter (RSA)
Gemma Calderón (ESP)

9 March 2026
17:15

Uruguay	3–2	Wales
Vilar 29'; Díaz 36'; Viana 41'	Report	Atkin 5'; Goodwin 48'

Umpires:
Lizelotte Wolter (NED)
Tamara Wood (AUS)

9 March 2026
19:30

Scotland	2–2	India
McEwan 6'; Burnet 33'	Report	Navneet 18'; Toppo 29'

Umpires:
Sandra Adell (ESP)
Cookie Tan (SGP)

11 March 2026
17:15

Uruguay	1–3	Scotland
Viana 19'	Report	Burnet 10'; Holdgate 43', 58'

Umpires:
Kim Yoon-seon (KOR)
Michael Dutrieux (BEL)

11 March 2026
19:30

India	4–1	Wales
Sakshi 7'; Navneet 29', 34', 55'	Report	Thomas 39'

Umpires:
Benjamin Messerli (SUI)
Pauline Cuypers (BEL)

=== Classification round ===
Crossover
13 March
South Korea	1
Wales	2
13 March
Uruguay	3
Austria	0

Fifth place
14 March
Wales	0
Uruguay	3
Seventh place
14 March
South Korea	1 (1)
Austria (pen.)	1 (2)

==== Crossovers ====
13 March 2026
12:45

South Korea	1–2	Wales
Park Y. 46'	Report	Bingham 49', 53'

Umpires:
Lizelotte Wolter (NED)
Gemma Calderón (ESP)

13 March 2026
15:00

Uruguay	3–0	Austria
Vilar 4'; Viana 21', 44'	Report

Umpires:
Wanri Venter (RSA)
Kim Yoon-seon (KOR)

==== Seventh and eighth place ====
14 March 2026
12:45

South Korea	1–1	Austria
Lee Yu-r. 31'	Report	Vukovich 3'
Penalties
Lee Yu-j. (penalty shoot-out scored); Kim S. (penalty shoot-out missed); Park S. (penalty shoot-out missed); Choi J. (penalty shoot-out missed); Lee Yu-r. (penalty shoot-out missed)	1–2	(penalty shoot-out scored) Czech; (penalty shoot-out missed) Proksch; (penalty shoot-out missed) Kern; (penalty shoot-out missed) Bauer; (penalty shoot-out scored) Kemper

Umpires:
Durga Devi (IND)
Michael Dutrieux (BEL)

==== Fifth and sixth place ====
14 March 2026
15:00

Wales	0–3	Uruguay
	Report	Viana 23'; Verga 36'; G. Curutchague 57'

Umpires:
Lizelotte Wolter (NED)
Rama Potnis (IND)

=== Medal round ===
Semi-finals
13 March
England	2
Scotland	0
13 March
India	1
Italy	0

Final
14 March
England	2
India	0
Third place
14 March
Scotland	1
Italy	0

==== Semi-finals ====
13 March 2026
17:15

England	2–0	Scotland
Bingham 25'; Bourne 29'	Report

Umpires:
Cookie Tan (SGP)
Pauline Cuypers (BEL)

13 March 2026
19:30

India	1–0	Italy
Manisha 40'	Report

Umpires:
Sandra Adell (ESP)
Tamara Wood (AUS)

==== Third and fourth place ====
14 March 2026
17:15

Scotland	1–0	Italy
Costello 7'	Report

Umpires:
Wanri Venter (RSA)
Gemma Calderón (ESP)

==== Final ====
14 March 2026
19:30

England	2–0	India
Balsdon 13'; Neal 43'	Report

Umpires:
Kim Yoon-seon (KOR)
Benjamin Messerli (SUI)

=== Goalscorers ===
There were 58 goals scored in 20 matches, for an average of 2.9 goals per match.

5 goals

- (England) Grace Balsdon
- (Uruguay) Teresa Viana

4 goals

- (India) Navneet Kaur

3 goals

- (England) Elizabeth Neal
- (Italy) Federica Carta

2 goals

- (England) Charlotte Bingham
- (India) Sunelita Toppo
- (Scotland) Fiona Burnet
- (Scotland) Amy Costello
- (Scotland) Katherine Holdgate
- (Uruguay) Manuela Vilar
- (Wales) Elizabeth Bingham

1 goal

- (Austria) Kristine Vukovich
- (England) Darcy Bourne
- (England) Holly Hunt
- (England) Lily Walker
- (England) Anna Toman
- (India) Manisha Chauhan
- (India) Lalremsiami Hmarzote
- (India) Ishika
- (India) Rutuja Pisal
- (India) Sakshi Rana
- (Italy) Lola Brea
- (Italy) Elenora di Paola
- (Italy) Ivanna Pessina
- (Scotland) Heather McEwan
- (South Korea) Choi Ji-yun
- (South Korea) Kim Seo-na
- (South Korea) Lee Yu-ri
- (South Korea) Park Yeong-eun
- (Uruguay) Guadalupe Curutchague
- (Uruguay) Agustina Díaz
- (Uruguay) Magdalena Verga
- (Wales) Anja Atkin
- (Wales) Rachel Goodwin
- (Wales) Betsan Thomas

Source: FIH

=== Final standings ===
Pos	Team	Qualification
1	England	Hockey World Cup
2	India	Hockey World Cup
3	Scotland	Hockey World Cup
4	Italy	
5	Uruguay	
6	Wales	
7	Austria	
8	South Korea	

Source: FIH

== Qualified teams ==
The following seven teams qualified for the 2026 Women's FIH Hockey World Cup in Belgium and the Netherlands.

Team	Qualified on	Qualified as	Previous appearances in the Women's FIH Hockey World Cup^{1}
Chile	7 March 2026	Santiago champions	1 (2022)
Australia	7 March 2026	Santiago runners-up	12 (1981, 1983, 1986, 1990, 1994, 1998, 2002, 2006, 2010, 2014, 2018, 2022)
Ireland	8 March 2026	Santiago third-place	6 (1986, 1994, 2002, 2010, 2018, 2022)
England	13 March 2026	Hyderabad champions	11 (1983, 1986, 1990, 1994, 1998, 2002, 2006, 2010, 2014, 2018, 2022)
India	13 March 2026	Hyderabad runners-up	8 (1974, 1978, 1983, 1998, 2006, 2010, 2018, 2022)
Scotland	14 March 2026	Hyderabad third-place	4 (1983, 1986, 1998, 2002)
Japan	14 March 2026	Highest ranked fourth-place	9 (1978, 1981, 1990, 2002, 2006, 2010, 2014, 2018, 2022)

^{1} Italic indicates hosts for that year.

== See also ==
- 2026 Women's FIH Hockey World Cup
- 2026 Men's FIH Hockey World Cup Qualifiers
