= 2018–19 Women's Hockey Series Open =

International field hockey competition

Tournament details
- Dates: 5 June – 9 December 2018
- Teams: 33 (from 5 confederations)
- Venue: 7 (in 7 host cities)

Tournament statistics
- Matches played: 70
- Goals scored: 493 (7.04 per match)
- Top scorer: (Mexico) Michel Navarro (15 goals)

The 2018–19 Women's Hockey Series Open was an international field hockey competition held from June to December 2018.

== Salamanca ==
Salamanca
Tournament details
- Host country: Mexico
- City: Salamanca
- Dates: 5–10 June
- Teams: 5
- Venue: Cancha de Hockey Siglo XXI

Final positions
- Champions: Canada
- Runner-up: Mexico
- Third place: Puerto Rico

Tournament statistics
- Matches played: 10
- Goals scored: 134 (13.4 per match)
- Top scorer: (Mexico) Michel Navarro (15 goals)

=== Pool ===
Pos	Team	Pld	W	D	L	GF	GA	GD	Pts	Qualification
1	Canada	4	4	0	0	71	3	+68	12	Hockey Series Finals
2	Mexico (H)	4	3	0	1	48	8	+40	9	Hockey Series Finals
3	Puerto Rico	4	2	0	2	15	22	−7	6	
4	Panama	4	0	1	3	0	38	−38	1	
5	Guatemala	4	0	1	3	0	63	−63	1	

Source: FIH
Rules for classification: 1) points; 2) goal difference; 3) goals scored; 4) head-to-head result.
(H) Hosts

All times are local (UTC−6).

=== Results ===
5 June 2018
14:30

Puerto Rico	8–0	Panama
Freaney 5', 7', 41', 54'; Miro 9', 48'; Batista 39'; Pacheco 56'	Report

Umpires:
Alejandra Pasillas (MEX)
Diana Borrayo (GUA)

5 June 2018
17:00

Mexico	30–0	Guatemala
Juárez 1', 38'; Valdés 2', 13'; Marl. Correa 6', 23', 32', 34', 38', 51'; Navarro 10', 17', 21', 34', 36', 39', 46', 46', 51'; Oviedo 10', 44', 56', 60'; González 15', 29', 44', 45', 59'; Orozco 29'; Marí. Correa 52'	Report

Umpires:
Megan Robertson (CAN)
Mariana Reydo (ARG)

6 June 2018
15:00

Canada	28–0	Guatemala
Norlander 1', 8', 30', 30', 48'; Stewart 3', 3', 19'; Johansen 4', 58'; Haughn 7'; Karringten 16', 42', 50'; McCrory 18', 35', 41', 51', 55', 60+'; A. Woodcroft 22', 57'; Stairs 24', 33'; Lee 29'; N. Woodcroft 44', 59'; Hennig 56'	Report

Umpires:
Mariana Reydo (ARG)
Alejandra Pasillas (MEX)

6 June 2018
17:00

Mexico	13–0	Panama
C. Correa 2', 35'; Juárez 8'; Oviedo 12', 36'; Navarro 24', 32', 46', 48'; Marl. Correa 27', 45'; Orozco 39'; Valdés 60'	Report

Umpires:
Megan Robertson (CAN)
Diana Borrayo (GUA)

7 June 2018
17:00

Puerto Rico	2–18	Canada
Vázquez 5'; Freaney 50'	Report	Stewart 6'; Stairs 11', 20'; Karringten 11', 39'; Norlander 19', 24', 44'; A. Woodcroft 21'; Haughn 28', 53'; Johnston 30', 56'; McCrory 49'; Hennig 51'; N. Woodcroft 54'; Leahy 57'; McManus 60'

Umpires:
Mariana Reydo (ARG)
Diana Borrayo (GUA)

8 June 2018
13:00

Panama	0–0	Guatemala
	Report

Umpires:
Alejandra Pasillas (MEX)
Megan Robertson (CAN)

9 June 2018
11:00

Guatemala	0–5	Puerto Rico
	Report	Chapman 18'; Freaney 25', 40', 42'; Miro 45'

Umpires:
Alejandra Pasillas (MEX)
Megan Robertson (CAN)

9 June 2018
13:00

Mexico	1–8	Canada
Navarro 47'	Report	Stairs 3', 31'; Karringten 6', 46'; Leahy 9'; McCrory 18', 56'; Hennig 60'

Umpires:
Diana Borrayo (GUA)
Mariana Reydo (ARG)

10 June 2018
11:00

Canada	17–0	Panama
Johansen 2'; Stairs 11', 15', 28', 33', 34'; Karringten 18'; Norlander 20', 36', 59'; McCrory 25', 46'; Hennig 26'; N. Woodcroft 33'; Stewart 44'; Haughn 48'; A. Woodcroft 51'	Report

Umpires:
Alejandra Pasillas (MEX)
Diana Borrayo (GUA)

10 June 2018
13:00

Puerto Rico	0–4	Mexico
	Report	Orozco 8'; Lacheno 25'; Navarro 26'; Marí. Correa 48'

Umpires:
Megan Robertson (CAN)
Mariana Reydo (ARG)

== Singapore ==
Hockey Series Open Singapore
Tournament details
- Host country: Singapore
- Dates: 23 June–1 July
- Teams: 6
- Venue: Seng Kang Sports Club

Final positions
- Champions: Malaysia
- Runner-up: Thailand
- Third place: Singapore

Tournament statistics
- Matches played: 18
- Goals scored: 120 (6.67 per match)
- Top scorer: (Malaysia) Nuraini Rashid (9 goals)

All times are local (UTC+8).

=== Pool ===
Pos	Team	Pld	W	D	L	GF	GA	GD	Pts	Qualification
1	Malaysia	5	5	0	0	45	1	+44	15	Final
2	Thailand	5	4	0	1	25	4	+21	12	Final
3	Kazakhstan	5	3	0	2	15	12	+3	9	Third place game
4	Singapore (H)	5	1	1	3	7	9	−2	4	Third place game
5	Hong Kong	5	1	1	3	12	17	−5	4	Fifth place game
6	Indonesia	5	0	0	5	0	61	−61	0	Fifth place game

Source: FIH
Rules for classification: 1) points; 2) goal difference; 3) goals scored; 4) head-to-head result.
(H) Hosts

=== Results ===
23 June 2018
14:30

Thailand	4–0	Hong Kong
Sakunpithak 3'; Aunjai 24', 51'; Nakpolkrung 44'	Report

Umpires:
Malissa Rahman (SGP)
Minami Inamoto (JPN)

23 June 2018
15:00

Malaysia	18–0	Indonesia
Saiuti 3', 4', 23'; Rashid 11', 22', 35'; Sylvester 14'; Zulkifli 17', 38'; Said 19', 20', 41'; Syafi 24'; Mat Isa 26'; Z. Aziz 26', 49'; Awang 42', 60'	Report

Umpires:
Bernadette Pangrazio (AUS)
Ornpimol Kittiteerasopon (THA)

23 June 2018
17:00

Kazakhstan	3–0	Singapore
Chepkassova 3'; Bissirova 14'; Domashneva 27'	Report

Umpires:
Norasyikin Shariudin (MAS)
Dinesha Perera (SRI)

24 June 2018
15:00

Malaysia	10–0	Hong Kong
Sukri 7'; Zulkifli 17', 46'; Rashid 19', 48'; Sylvester 22'; Onn 32'; Said 42'; Ruhani 53', 57'	Report

Umpires:
Assel Mukasheva (KAZ)
Bernadette Pangrazio (AUS)

24 June 2018
15:30

Indonesia	0–8	Kazakhstan
	Report	Sazontova 8', 51', 52'; Gataulina 20', 49'; Sabazova 33'; Domashneva 43', 54'

Umpires:
Rinky See (HKG)
Ornpimol Kittiteerasopon (THA)

24 June 2018
17:00

Thailand	1–0	Singapore
Sakunpithak 25'	Report

Umpires:
Binish Hayat (PAK)
Minami Inamoto (JPN)

26 June 2018
17:30

Indonesia	0–16	Thailand
	Report	Sakunpithak 4', 12', 35'; Tongkham 11'; Sanpoung 13', 22', 24', 26', 37'; Aunjai 14', 59'; Samanso 21'; Nakpolkrung 34'; Wongkeaw 44'; Jutawijittam 50'; Prasanpim 60'

Umpires:
Assel Mukasheva (KAZ)
Malissa Rahman (SGP)

26 June 2018
19:30

Kazakhstan	1–8	Malaysia
Domashneva 30'	Report	Onn 7', 9', 49'; Ruhani 29'; Said 39'; Rashid 40'; Syafi 46'; Awang 58'

Umpires:
Minami Inamoto (JPN)
Ornpimol Kittiteerasopon (THA)

26 June 2018
20:00

Singapore	0–0	Hong Kong
	Report

Umpires:
Binish Hayat (PAK)
Dinesha Perera (SRI)

27 June 2018
17:30

Thailand	0–4	Malaysia
	Report	Sylvester 23'; Rashid 24'; Zulkifli 43'; Onn 53'

Umpires:
Bernadette Pangrazio (AUS)
Rinky See (HKG)

27 June 2018
19:30

Hong Kong	0–3	Kazakhstan
	Report	Domashneva 18'; Gataulina 39'; Sabazova 60'

Umpires:
Norasyikin Shariudin (MAS)
Mila Yuliarni (INA)

27 June 2018
20:00

Singapore	7–0	Indonesia
Johana 4'; Sanip 24', 28', 30'; Tan 29'; I. Chan 42'; Tam 49'	Report

Umpires:
Assel Mukasheva (KAZ)
Binish Hayat (PAK)

29 June 2018
15:30

Hong Kong	12–0	Indonesia
T. Chan 3', 28', 29'; Chan 4'; McNeil 15', 46'; Cheung 30', 52', 58'; Chuen 34'; Chui 47'; Aiello 49'	Report

Umpires:
Binish Hayat (PAK)
Dinesha Perera (SRI)

29 June 2018
16:00

Kazakhstan	0–4	Thailand
	Report	Sanpoung 13', 16', 28'; Nakpolkrung 34'

Umpires:
Bernadette Pangrazio (AUS)
Minami Inamoto (JPN)

29 June 2018
18:00

Malaysia	5–0	Singapore
Z. Aziz 1'; Saiuti 6'; Zulkifli 30'; Sukri 55'; Rashid 58'	Report

Umpires:
Rinky See (HKG)
Assel Mukasheva (KAZ)

==== Fifth place game ====
1 July 2018
15:15

Hong Kong	4–0	Indonesia
Aiello 14'; So 45'; Sik 49'; Chuen 57'	Report

Umpires:
Malissa Rahman (SGP)
Norasyikin Shariudin (MAS)

==== Third place game ====
30 June 2018
16:45

Kazakhstan	3–3	Singapore
Sabazova 5'; Bissirova 10'; Gataulina 56'	Report	Ng 32'; Tan 47'; Toh 59'
Penalties
Sabazova (penalty shoot-out missed); Gataulina (penalty shoot-out scored); Domashneva (penalty shoot-out scored); Dobrioglo (penalty shoot-out missed)	2–4	(penalty shoot-out scored) Chua; (penalty shoot-out scored) Sanip; (penalty shoot-out scored) Tan; (penalty shoot-out missed) Toh; (penalty shoot-out scored) Ng

Umpires:
Bernadette Pangrazio (AUS)
Rinky See (HKG)

==== Final ====
1 July 2018
15:45

Malaysia	6–0	Thailand
Sukri 2', 5'; Awang 8'; Gurdip 30'; Rashid 51'; Zulkifli 56'	Report

Umpires:
Minami Inamoto (JPN)
Assel Mukasheva (KAZ)

=== Final ranking ===
Qualified for the Hockey Series Finals

Rank	Team
1	Malaysia
2	Thailand
3	Singapore
4	Kazakhstan
5	Hong Kong
6	Indonesia

== Wattignies ==
Wattignies
Tournament details
- Host country: France
- City: Wattignies
- Dates: 6–8 July
- Teams: 4

Final positions
- Champions: Belarus
- Runner-up: Russia
- Third place: France

Tournament statistics
- Matches played: 6
- Goals scored: 30 (5 per match)
- Top scorer: (Russia) Bogdana Sadovaia (5 goals)

=== Pool ===
Pos	Team	Pld	W	D	L	GF	GA	GD	Pts	Qualification
1	Belarus	3	3	0	0	15	2	+13	9	Hockey Series Finals
2	Russia	3	2	0	1	10	7	+3	6	Hockey Series Finals
3	France (H)	3	1	0	2	5	8	−3	3	Hockey Series Finals
4	Austria	3	0	0	3	0	13	−13	0	

Source: FIH
Rules for classification: 1) points; 2) goal difference; 3) goals scored; 4) head-to-head result.
(H) Hosts

All times are local (UTC+2).

=== Results ===
6 July 2018
14:30

Belarus	4–0	France
Mikheichyk 39', 59'; Papkova 58'; Bahushevich 60+'	Report

Umpires:
Lisette Baljon (NED)
Xenia Ulrich (AUT)

6 July 2018
18:00

Russia	4–0	Austria
Sadovaia 4', 12'; Eroshina 10'; Sartakova 24'	Report

Umpires:
Ines El-Hajem (FRA)
Elena Ozerskaia (BLR)

7 July 2018
16:00

Russia	2–5	Belarus
Sartakova 36', 49'	Report	Sazhina 1', 35'; Shtsin 26'; Kurhanskaya 27'; Bahushevich 57'

Umpires:
Ines El-Hajem (FRA)
Xenia Ulrich (AUT)

7 July 2018
18:00

France	3–0	Austria
Lecas 2'; Duby 8'; Lhopital 32'	Report

Umpires:
Lisette Baljon (NED)
Anastasia Bogolyubova (RUS)

8 July 2018
16:00

Belarus	6–0	Austria
Mikheichyk 9'; Batura 30'; Sazhina 37'; Nikitsina 42'; Sidarava 55'; Bahushevich 60'	Report

Umpires:
Lisette Baljon (NED)
Anastasia Bogolyubova (RUS)

8 July 2018
18:00

France	2–4	Russia
Simon 19'; Duby 47'	Report	Sadovaia 4', 43', 59'; Shumilina 45'

Umpires:
Xenia Ulrich (AUT)
Elena Ozerskaia (BLR)

== Port Vila ==
Hockey Series Open Port Vila
Tournament details
- Host country: Vanuatu
- City: Port Vila
- Dates: 15–18 August
- Teams: 4
- Venue: Port Vila hockey

Final positions
- Champions: Fiji
- Runner-up: Vanuatu
- Third place: Solomon Islands

Tournament statistics
- Matches played: 8
- Goals scored: 59 (7.38 per match)
- Top scorer: (Fiji) Tiara Dutta (9 goals)

Matches were played in a Hockey5s format.

=== Pool ===
Pos	Team	Pld	W	D	L	GF	GA	GD	Pts	Qualification
1	Fiji	3	3	0	0	26	1	+25	9	Final
2	Vanuatu (H)	3	2	0	1	13	7	+6	6	Final
3	Solomon Islands	3	1	0	2	7	15	−8	3	Third place game
4	Tonga	3	0	0	3	3	26	−23	0	Third place game

Source: FIH
Rules for classification: 1) points; 2) goal difference; 3) goals scored; 4) head-to-head result.
(H) Hosts

All times are local (UTC+11).

=== Results ===
15 August 2018
11:00

Tonga	0–9	Vanuatu
	Report	Noal 2', 20'; Kalsong 6', 29'; N. Aru 9'; D. Aru 16', 24'; Job 19'; K. Aru 26'

Umpires:
Harry Heritage (FIJ)
Samson Auga (SOL)

15 August 2018
17:00

Solomon Islands	2–4	Vanuatu
Ghailobo 21'; Votu 25'	Report	Noal 1'; Siro 16'; N. Aru 19'; Job 19'

Umpires:
Catherine Thaggard (FIJ)
Nick Saunders (NZL)

16 August 2018
09:00

Tonga	0–13	Fiji
	Report	Dutta 2', 12', 29'; Ah Yuk 4', 5', 14', 19', 25'; Vuetananvanua 8'; Silatolu 9', 26'; Tikoitoga 12'; Adigoneca 15'

Umpires:
Nick Saunders (NZL)
Samson Auga (SOL)

16 August 2018
14:00

Fiji	8–1	Solomon Islands
Dutta 3', 3', 4', 16', 17'; Tikoitoga 9'; Ah Yuk 18'; Stephens 29'	Report	Maeoli 11'

Umpires:
Catherine Thaggard (FIJ)
Samson Auga (SOL)

17 August 2018
11:00

Fiji	5–0	Vanuatu
Ah Yuk 2'; Tikoitoga 20'; Adigoneca 21'; Silatolu 21'; Bennion 27'	Report

Umpires:
Samson Auga (SOL)
Nick Saunders (NZL)

17 August 2018
12:00

Tonga	3–4	Solomon Islands
Finau 3', 24'; Makaafi 8'	Report	Manu 6', 16'; Kabini 12'; Votu 29'

Umpires:
Catherine Thaggard (FIJ)
Malkom Mayoho (VAN)

==== Third place game ====
18 August 2018
10:00

Solomon Islands	4–1	Tonga
Manu 6'; Votu 20'; Kabini 27', 30'	Report	T. Mahe 15'

Umpires:
Nick Saunders (NZL)
Harry Heritage (FIJ)

==== Final ====
18 August 2018
12:00

Fiji	3–2	Vanuatu
Dutta 4'; Adigoneca 4'; Ah Yuk 17'	Report	Job 21'; Kalsong 23'

Umpires:
Frank Vira (VAN)
Catherine Thaggard (FIJ)

=== Final ranking ===
Qualified for the Hockey Series Finals

Rank	Team
1	Fiji
2	Vanuatu
3	Solomon Islands
4	Tonga

== Vilnius ==
Vilnius
Tournament details
- Host country: Lithuania
- City: Vilnius
- Dates: 21–26 August
- Teams: 5

Final positions
- Champions: Ukraine
- Runner-up: Czech Republic
- Third place: Wales

Tournament statistics
- Matches played: 10
- Goals scored: 32 (3.2 per match)
- Top scorer: (Czech Republic) Kateřina Jelínková (4 goals)

=== Pool ===
Pos	Team	Pld	W	D	L	GF	GA	GD	Pts	Qualification
1	Ukraine	4	4	0	0	9	1	+8	12	Hockey Series Finals
2	Czech Republic	4	2	0	2	11	7	+4	6	Hockey Series Finals
3	Wales	4	2	0	2	5	4	+1	6	Hockey Series Finals
4	Lithuania (H)	4	1	1	2	5	7	−2	4	
5	Turkey	4	0	1	3	2	13	−11	1	

Source: FIH
Rules for classification: 1) points; 2) goal difference; 3) goals scored; 4) head-to-head result.
(H) Hosts

=== Results ===
21 August 2018
17:00

Wales	1–0	Turkey
Burton 43'	Report

Umpires:
Sandra Wagner (GER)
Kamilė Mockaitytė (LTU)

21 August 2018
19:00

Lithuania	0–2	Ukraine
	Report	Ponomarenko 21'; Samokhodchenko 58'

Umpires:
Anastasia Bogolyubova (RUS)
Teresa Lipsky (GER)

22 August 2018
17:00

Czech Republic	7–1	Turkey
Decsyová 5'; Mejzlíková 15'; Vorlová 21'; Jelínková 33', 42'; Duchková 37'; Laciná 53'	Report	Küçükkoç 14'

Umpires:
Olena Klymenko (UKR)
Toni-Lee Lambert (WAL)

22 August 2018
19:00

Wales	0–1	Ukraine
	Report	Kernoz 24'

Umpires:
Sandra Wagner (GER)
Anastasia Bogolyubova (RUS)

23 August 2018
19:00

Lithuania	2–4	Czech Republic
Nomeikaitė 25'; Juodytė 34'	Report	Jelínková 12', 16'; Duchková 36'; Kolářová 38'

Umpires:
Olena Klymenko (UKR)
Kamilė Mockaitytė (LTU)

24 August 2018
17:00

Ukraine	5–1	Turkey
Kernoz 18'; Vorushylo 27'; Tokar 28', 50'; Honcharenko 33'	Report	Köşker 59'

Umpires:
Kamilė Mockaitytė (LTU)
Teresa Lipsky (GER)

25 August 2018
15:00

Wales	3–0	Czech Republic
Westwood 17'; Richards 34'; Bingham 36'	Report

Umpires:
Kamilė Mockaitytė (LTU)
Sandra Wagner (GER)

25 August 2018
17:00

Turkey	0–0	Lithuania
	Report

Umpires:
Olena Klymenko (UKR)
Anastasia Bogolyubova (RUS)

The game was stopped after 40 minutes due to heavy rain and continued on 09:30 the next day.

26 August 2018
14:00

Czech Republic	0–1	Ukraine
	Report	Honcharenko 53'

Umpires:
Toni-Lee Lambert (WAL)
Teresa Lipsky (GER)

26 August 2018
16:00

Lithuania	3–1	Wales
Petrikaitė 38'; Jakovļeva 45'; Juodytė 51'	Report	Richards 55'

Umpires:
Sandra Wagner (GER)
Anastasia Bogolyubova (RUS)

== Santiago ==
Santiago
Tournament details
- Host country: Chile
- City: Santiago
- Dates: 18–23 September
- Teams: 6
- Venue: Prince of Wales Country Club

Final positions
- Champions: Chile
- Runner-up: Uruguay
- Third place: Paraguay

Tournament statistics
- Matches played: 15
- Goals scored: 109 (7.27 per match)
- Top scorer: (Chile) María Maldonado (11 goals)

=== Pool ===
Pos	Team	Pld	W	D	L	GF	GA	GD	Pts	Qualification
1	Chile (H)	5	5	0	0	51	0	+51	15	Hockey Series Finals
2	Uruguay	5	4	0	1	41	2	+39	12	Hockey Series Finals
3	Paraguay	5	3	0	2	11	20	−9	9	
4	Brazil	5	2	0	3	4	18	−14	6	
5	Peru	5	1	0	4	2	26	−24	3	
6	Bolivia	5	0	0	5	0	43	−43	0	

Source: FIH
Rules for classification: 1) points; 2) goal difference; 3) goals scored; 4) head-to-head result.
(H) Hosts

All times are local (UTC−4).

=== Results ===
18 September 2018
08:00

Brazil	2–0	Peru
Beljon 25'; Peyloubet 27'	Report

Umpires:
Veronica Villafañe (ARG)
Claudia Flores (PAR)

18 September 2018
10:00

Uruguay	7–1	Paraguay
Dall'Orso 10'; Vilar 18'; Olave 31'; Algorta 32', 60+'; Esposto 40'; Barrandeguy 49'	Report	Cardozo 53'

Umpires:
María Locatelli (ARG)
Claudia Montino (CHI)

18 September 2018
12:00

Chile	19–0	Bolivia
Villalabeitia 6', 33'; Maldonado 9', 18', 58'; García 13', 14', 16', 51', 54'; Krimerman 17', 42'; Salas 25', 35'; Villagran 27'; Caram 44', 48'; Valdivia 50', 57'	Report

Umpires:
Mercedes Sánchez (ARG)
Natalia Lodeiro (URU)

19 September 2018
08:00

Uruguay	13–0	Peru
Algorta 7', 13', 38', 48'; Barrandeguy 11'; Vilar 29', 45'; García 32', 32'; Barreiro 35'; Amadeo 38', 56'; Taborda 41'	Report

Umpires:
Mercedes Sánchez (ARG)
Victoria Pazos (PAR)

19 September 2018
10:00

Bolivia	0–2	Brazil
	Report	Peyloubet 5'; Queiroz 22'

Umpires:
María Locatelli (ARG)
Claudia Flores (PAR)

19 September 2018
12:00

Chile	13–0	Paraguay
Caram 4'; Maldonado 9', 40', 48', 58'; Tala 16', 20', 25'; Palma 44'; Krimerman 49'; Cambiaso 50', 57'; Valdivia 60'	Report

Umpires:
Veronica Villafañe (ARG)
Natalia Lodeiro (URU)

20 September 2018
08:00

Bolivia	0–17	Uruguay
	Report	Viana 4', 19'; Amadeo 8'; Taborda 18'; Vilar 20', 24', 24'; Algorta 32'; Stanley 35', 56'; Barreiro 39', 42'; Olave 40', 57'; García 41'; Esposito 50'; Barrandeguy 53'

Umpires:
Claudia Flores (PAR)
Veronica Villafañe (ARG)

20 September 2018
10:00

Peru	0–3	Paraguay
	Report	van Jaarsveld 22'; Cardozo 38'; Rodríguez 53'

Umpires:
Natalia Lodeiro (URU)
Claudia Montino (CHI)

20 September 2018
12:00

Brazil	0–10	Chile
	Report	Jacob 2', 41'; Parra 12', 58'; Krimerman 14', 56'; García 15'; Tala 30'; Maldonado 35', 38'

Umpires:
Victoria Pazos (PAR)
María Locatelli (ARG)

22 September 2018
08:00

Paraguay	3–0	Bolivia
van Jaarsveld 27'; Vera 32'; Sánchez 54'	Report

Umpires:
Claudia Montino (CHI)
Veronica Villafañe (ARG)

22 September 2018
10:00

Brazil	0–4	Uruguay
	Report	Vilar 12', 23', 34'; Taborda 56'

Umpires:
María Locatelli (ARG)
Victoria Pazos (PAR)

22 September 2018
12:00

Chile	8–0	Peru
Jacob 22'; Maldonado 29', 58'; Solano 42'; Salas 44', 58'; García 46'; Valdivia 56'	Report

Umpires:
Claudia Flores (PAR)
Mercedes Sánchez (ARG)

23 September 2018
08:00

Paraguay	4–0	Brazil
Acuna 15'; Sánchez 21', 41'; Van Jaarsveld 42'	Report

Umpires:
Mercedes Sánchez (ARG)
Natalia Lodeiro (URU)

23 September 2018
10:00

Peru	2–0	Bolivia
Olaechea 6'; Ardiles 48'	Report

Umpires:
Victoria Pazos (PAR)
Claudia Montino (CHI)

23 September 2018
12:00

Uruguay	0–1	Chile
	Report	Villagran 43'

Umpires:
Veronica Villafañe (ARG)
María Locatelli (ARG)

== Bulawayo ==
Hockey Series Open Bulawayo
Tournament details
- Host country: Zimbabwe
- City: Bulawayo
- Dates: 7–9 December
- Teams: 3
- Venue: Khumalo Hockey Stadium

Final positions
- Champions: Namibia
- Runner-up: Zambia
- Third place: Zimbabwe

Tournament statistics
- Matches played: 3
- Goals scored: 9 (3 per match)
- Top scorer: Nine players (1 goals)

=== Pool ===
Pos	Team	Pld	W	D	L	GF	GA	GD	Pts	Qualification
1	Namibia	2	2	0	0	4	0	+4	6	Hockey Series Finals
2	Zambia	2	1	0	1	3	5	−2	3	
3	Zimbabwe (H)	2	0	0	2	2	4	−2	0	

Source: FIH
Rules for classification: 1) points; 2) goal difference; 3) goals scored; 4) head-to-head result.
(H) Hosts

All times are local (UTC+2).

=== Results ===
7 December 2018
12:00

Namibia	3–0	Zambia
Kruger 5'; Schimming 35'; Gerber 37'	Report

Umpires:
Sharne Mayers (ZIM)
Mike Banda (ZIM)

8 December 2018
12:00

Zambia	3–2	Zimbabwe
Anna Banda 37'; Nakombe 57'; Kalomo 60'	Report	A. Terblanche 30'; Mtausi 32'

Umpires:
Mike Banda (ZIM)
Peter Caulder (RSA)

9 December 2018
12:00

Zimbabwe	0–1	Namibia
	Report	Mengo 26'

Umpires:
Sharne Mayers (ZIM)
Mohamed Hassan (EGY)
