= Chile women's national under-21 field hockey team =

National U21 Hockey Team, Chile

Chile
- Association: Federación Chilena de Hockey sobre Césped
- Confederation: PAHF (Pan America)
- Head Coach: Emiliano Monteleone
- Manager: Alfredo Castro
- Captain: Francisca Parra

Junior World Cup
- Appearances: 7 (first in 1989)
- Best result: 10th (2005)

The Chile women's national under-21 field hockey team represents Chile in international under-21 field hockey competitions. The team is controlled by the governing body for field hockey in Chile, the Federación Chilena de Hockey sobre Césped, which is a member of the Pan American Hockey Federation (PAHF) and the International Hockey Federation (FIH).

The team's first recorded appearance was at the 1988 Pan American Junior Championship, where the team finished in third place.

The team's last appearance was in 2026, during the Pan American Junior Championship in Santiago.

== History ==
=== Tournament Records ===
FIH Junior World Cup
Year	Location	Position	Pld	W	D	L	GF	GA	GD	Pts
1989	Ottawa, Canada	11th	6	1	0	5	2	36	–34	3
1993	Terrassa, Spain	Did not participate								
1997	Seongnam, South Korea	Did not participate								
2001	Buenos Aires, Argentina	12th	7	2	0	5	4	20	–16	6
2005	Santiago, Chile	10th	8	2	1	5	12	17	–5	7
2009	Boston, United States	12th	7	1	0	6	4	20	–16	3
2013	Mönchengladbach, Germany	Did not participate								
2016	Santiago, Chile	11th	5	1	1	3	6	12	–6	4
2021	Potchefstroom, South Africa	Did not qualify								
2023	Santiago, Chile	12th	6	2	0	4	5	16	–11	6
2025	Santiago, Chile	18th	6	3	1	2	11	15	–4	10
2027	TBD	Qualified								

Pan American Junior Championship
Year	Location	Position	Pld	W	D	L	GF	GA	GD	Pts
1988	Buenos Aires, Argentina	3rd	–	–	–	–	–	–	–	–
1992	Caracas, Venezuela	Did not participate.								
1997	Santiago, Chile	4th	6	3	0	3	18	20	–2	9
2000	Bridgetown, Barbados	4th	6	3	1	2	14	11	+3	10
2005	San Juan, Puerto Rico	3rd	7	5	0	2	33	8	+25	15
2008	Mexico City, Mexico	2nd	5	3	1	1	24	5	+19	10
2012	Guadalajara, Mexico	4th	7	5	0	2	41	8	+33	15
2016	Tacarigua, Trinidad and Tobago	3rd	6	4	0	2	17	16	+1	12
2021	Santiago, Chile	4th	4	1	1	2	13	4	+9	4
2023	St. Michael, Barbados	3rd	5	4	1	0	37	2	+35	12
2024	Surrey, Canada	3rd	7	4	1	2	15	10	+5	13
2026	Santiago, Chile	4th	7	2	1	4	5	13	-8	7

== Team ==
=== Current squad ===
The following 18 players represented Chile at the 2021 Pan American Junior Championship in Santiago.

Caps and goals updated as of 28 August 2021 after the match against the United States.

No.	Pos.	Player	Date of birth (age)	Caps	Goals	Club
1	GK	Rosario Lanz	30 August 1999 (age 27)	3	0	(Chile) Prince of Wales Country Club
24	GK	Antonia Sáez	21 June 2001 (age 25)	1	0	(Chile) Prince of Wales Country Club
3	DF	Paula Sanz	4 June 1999 (age 27)	4	0	(Chile) Universidad Católica
4	DF	Amanda Martínez	9 March 2000 (age 26)	4	1	(Chile) Old Gabs
6	DF	Valeria Nazal	12 June 2000 (age 26)	4	0	(Chile) Dunners
8	DF	Michaela Stockins	5 August 1999 (age 27)	4	0	(Chile) Prince of Wales Country Club
11	DF	Michelle de Witt	6 March 1999 (age 27)	4	0	(Chile) Club Manquehue
15	MF	Constanza Jugo	4 May 2001 (age 25)	4	1	(Chile) Old Girls
16	MF	Carolina Mújica	16 October 2000 (age 26)	4	1	(Chile) Alumni
17	MF	Francisca Irazoqui	4 December 2003 (age 22)	4	0	(Chile) Prince of Wales Country Club
19	MF	Constanza Pérez	14 April 2002 (age 24)	4	0	(Chile) Old Girls
21	MF	Milagros Gago	12 February 2003 (age 23)	4	0	(Chile) Universidad Católica
5	FW	Francisca Parra (C)	6 October 1999 (age 27)	4	0	(Chile) Universidad Católica
7	FW	Dominga Lüders	9 October 2000 (age 26)	4	1	(Chile) Club Manquehue
9	FW	Fernanda Arrieta	27 January 2001 (age 25)	4	3	(Chile) Club Manquehue
10	FW	Simone Avelli	6 May 2000 (age 26)	4	3	(Chile) Prince of Wales Country Club
12	FW	Antonia Irazoqui	26 September 2000 (age 26)	4	1	(Chile) Prince of Wales Country Club
18	FW	Fernanda Ramírez	16 March 1999 (age 27)	4	2	(Chile) Alumni

=== Past squads ===
Pan American Junior Championship

2005 PAJC Squad
1. Constanza Abud (GK)
2. Pilar Donoso
3. Cristine Fingerhuth
4. Alexandra Sclabos
5. Catalina Thiermann
6. Camila Infante
7. Denise Infante
8. Carolina García (C)
9. Fernanda Carvajal
10. María Fernández
11. Beatriz Albertz
12. Francisca Flores
13. Camila Cabargas
14. Cristina Wagner
15. Daniela Caram
16. Sofía Walbaum
17. Francisca Pizarro
18. Alejandra Delgado (GK)
2008 PAJC Squad
1. Claudia Schüler (GK)
2. Sofía Walbaum (C)
3. Javiera MacKenna
4. Beatriz Thiermann
5. Camila Caram
6. María José MacKenna
7. Manuela Urroz
8. Cristina Wagner
9. Cristine Fingerhuth
10. Marianne Pollmann
11. Andrea Greene
12. Josefa Villalabeitia
13. Catalina Sclabos
14. Paula Leinz
15. Camila Vargas
16. Carla Manettí
17. Valentina Crúz
18. Macarena Liu (GK)
2012 PAJC Squad
1. Beatriz Wirth (GK)
2. María José MacKenna
3. Denise Krimerman
4. Catalina Barahona
5. Constanza Palma
6. Fernanda Flores (C)
7. Sofía Filipek
8. Josefina Khamis
9. Francisca Vidaurre
10. Manuela Urroz
11. Agustina Venegas
12. Constanza Olivares (GK)
13. Josefina Poblete
14. Trinidad Sotomeyer
15. Josefa Salas
16. Catalina Salas
17. Francisca Tala
18. Tatiana Sclabos
2016 PAJC Squad
1. Juliana López (GK)
2. Josefina Cambiaso
3. Fernanda Manríquez
4. Fernanda Villagrán
5. María Maldonado
6. Agustina Solano
7. Josefa Salas
8. Sophia Lahsen
9. Catalina Peragallo
10. Sofía Machado
11. Paula Valdivia
12. Noemi Abusleme (GK)
13. Pilar Zapico
14. Antonia Morales
15. Doménica Ananías
17. Consuelo de las Heras
18. Denise Krimerman (C)
21. Kim Jacob
2021 PAJC Squad
1. Rosario Lanz (GK)
3. Paula Sanz
4. Amanda Martínez
5. Francisca Parra (C)
6. Valeria Nazal
7. Dominga Lüders
8. Michaela Stockins
9. Fernanda Arrieta
10. Simone Avelli
11. Michelle de Witt
12. Antonia Irazoqui
15. Constanza Jugo
16. Carolina Mújica
17. Francisca Irazoqui
18. Fernanda Ramírez
19. Constanza Pérez
21. Milagros Gago
24. Antonia Sáez (GK)

FIH Junior World Cup

2005 JWC Squad
1. Constanza Abud (GK)
2. Sofía Walbaum
3. Andrea Sánchez
4. Alexandra Sclabos
5. Catalina Thiermann
6. Francisca Pizarro
7. Denise Infante
8. Carolina García (C)
9. Camila Infante
10. María Fernández
11. Beatriz Albertz
12. Claudia Schüler (GK)
13. Veronica Bosch
14. Cristina Wagner
15. Daniela Caram
16. Fernanda Carvajal
17. Pilar Donoso
18. Francisca Flores
2009 JWC Squad
1. Beatriz Wirth (GK)
2. Sofía Walbaum (C)
3. Javiera MacKenna
4. Constanza Sánchez
5. Camila Caram
6. María José MacKenna
7. Manuela Urroz
8. Paula Leniz
9. Josefa Villalabeitia
10. Marianne Pollmann
11. Andrea Greene
12. Valentina Cerda (GK)
13. Catalina Sclabos
14. Constanza Palma
15. Paula Liu
16. María Jesús Arestizabal
17. Tatiana Sclabos
18. Francisca Vidaurre
2016 JWC Squad
1. Sachi Ananías (GK)
2. Josefina Cambiaso
4. Fernanda Villagrán
5. María Maldonado
6. Agustina Solano
7. Josefa Salas
8. Sophia Lahsen
9. Catalina Peragallo
10. Sofía Machado
11. Paula Valdivia
12. Noemi Abusleme (GK)
13. Pilar Zapico
14. Antonia Morales
15. Doménica Ananías
17. Consuelo de las Heras
18. Denise Krimerman (C)
19. Florencia Martínez
21. Kim Jacob
