= Doménica Ananías =

Chilean field hockey player (born 1998)

Personal information
- Full name: Doménica Emilia Ananías Cancino
- Born: 18 August 1998 (age 28) Santiago, Chile

Sport
- Sport: Field hockey
- Position: Midfield
- Club: Zehlendorfer Wespen
National team
Years	Team	Caps	Goals
2016–2018	Chile U–21	17	(1)
2018–	Chile	69	(2)
Medal record
Women's field hockey
Representing Chile
Pan American Games
Bronze medal – third place	2023 Santiago	Team
Pan American Cup
Silver medal – second place	2022 Santiago	Team
South American Games
Gold medal – first place	2022 Asunción	Team
FIH Nations Cup
Bronze medal – third place	2023–24 Terrassa	Team
FIH Hockey Series
Bronze medal – third place	2018–19 Hiroshima	Team
Pan American Junior Championship
Bronze medal – third place	2016 Tacarigua	Team

Doménica Emilia Ananías Cancino (born 18 August 1998) is a field hockey player from Chile.

== Career ==
=== Domestic league ===
In liga Iberdrola Spanish national league, Ananías competes for Real Sociedad. During the 2024–25 season, she relocated to Germany and has been representing Zehlendorfer Wespen in the Bundesliga.

=== Under–21 ===
Ananías represented the Chilean U–21 side from 2016 to 2018. During her junior career she medalled with the squad once, winning bronze at the 2016 Pan American Junior Championship in Tacarigua. She also represented the team at the 2016 FIH Junior World Cup, held in her hometown of Santiago.

=== Las Diablas ===
Ananías has been representing Las Diablas since 2018. She made her senior international debut during a test–series against Canada. Since her debut, she has been a regular inclusion in the national team.

In 2022, she was an integral part of Chile's history making year. At the Pan American Cup in Santiago, the team won silver, qualifying for the FIH World Cup for the first time. She then went on to represent Chile at the Women's World Cup held in Terrassa and Amsterdam, finishing in thirteenth position. Finally, she was a member of the gold medal-winning squad at the South American Games in Asunción.

She won a bronze medal with the national squad in 2023, taking out the bronze medal match at a home Pan American Games in Santiago.

During 2024, Ananías represented the national squad on two occasions. First at the FIH Olympic Qualifiers in Ranchi, where the team finished in seventh place. She then went on to win another medal with the team, taking home bronze at the 2023–24 FIH Nations Cup in Terrassa.

== International Goals ==
The following is a list of goals scored by Ananías at international level.

Goal	Date	Location	Opponent	Score	Result	Competition	Ref.
1	19 April 2019	Ritsumeikan University, Osaka, Japan	Japan	1–0	1–0	Test Match	
2	27 January 2022	Prince of Wales Country Club, Santiago, Chile	United States	1–0	1–1	2022 Pan American Cup	
