= Amanda Martínez =

Chilean field hockey player

Personal information
- Full name: Amanda Martínez Encina
- Born: 9 March 2000 (age 26) Chile

Sport
- Sport: Field hockey
- Position: Defence
National team
Years	Team	Caps	Goals
2021	Chile U21	4	(1)
2022–	Chile	2	(0)
Medal record
Women's field hockey
Representing Chile
FIH Nations Cup
Bronze medal – third place	2023–24 Terrassa	Team

Amanda Martínez Encina (born 9 March 2000) is a field hockey player from Chile.

== Career ==
=== Junior national team ===
Amanda Martínez made her debut for the Chile U–21 team at the 2021 Pan American Junior Championship in Santiago. She was the scorer of Chile's opening goal of the tournament.

=== Las Diablas ===
Following her junior debut, Martínez was named in the Las Diablas squad for the first time the in 2021. She made her international debut the following year at the inaugural FIH Nations Cup in Valencia.
