= Constanza Muñoz =

Chilean field hockey player

Personal information
- Full name: Constanza Jesús Muñoz Del Valle
- Born: 31 July 2002 (age 24) Chile

Sport
- Sport: Field hockey
- Position: Defence
- Club: Old Gabs
National team
Years	Team	Caps	Goals
2023–2023	Chile U–21	11	(4)
2025–	Chile	5	(0)
Medal record
Women's field hockey
Representing Chile
FIH Nations Cup
Bronze medal – third place	2024–25 Santiago
Pan American Junior Championship
Bronze medal – third place	2023 Saint Michael

Constanza Jesús Muñoz Del Valle (born 31 July 2002) is a field hockey player from Chile.

== Career ==
=== Domestic hockey ===
In the Chilean National League, Muñoz represents Old Gabs.

=== Under–21 ===
Muñoz made her international debut at under–21 level. She made her first appearances for the Chile U–21 at the 2023 Pan American Junior Championship in Saint Michael. At the tournament, she helped the side to a bronze medal. Later that year she represented the side again, competing at the FIH Junior World Cup, held in her home country's capital, Santiago.

=== Las Diablas ===
In 2025, Muñoz received her first call-up to Las Diablas. She made her senior international debut during the 2024–25 FIH Nations Cup in Santiago. At the tournament, she won a bronze medal. She has most recently been named in the squad for the 2025 Pan American Cup in Montevideo.
