= María Maldonado =

María Maldonado may refer to:

- María José Maldonado (born 1985), Paraguayan singer, model and beauty pageant titleholder
- Maria Maldonado (Miss Kentucky) (born 1982), American beauty pageant titleholder
- María Garfias Maldonado (born 1968), Mexican politician
- María Maldonado (field hockey) (born 1997), Chilean field hockey player
