= Laura Müller (field hockey) =

Chilean field hockey player

Personal information
- Full name: Laura Müller Harrison
- Born: 22 September 2005 (age 20) Chile

Sport
- Sport: Field hockey
- Position: Forward
National team
Years	Team	Caps	Goals
2023–	Chile U21	15	(20)
2023–	Chile	25	(17)
Medal record
Representing Chile
Women's field hockey
Pan American Games
Bronze medal – third place	2023 Santiago	Team
FIH Nations Cup
Bronze medal – third place	2023–24 Terrassa	Team
Junior Pan American Games
Bronze medal – third place	2025 Asunción	Team
Pan American Junior Championship
Bronze medal – third place	2023 St. Michael	Team
Bronze medal – third place	2024 Surrey

Laura Müller Harrison (born 22 September 2005) is a Chilean field hockey player, who plays as a forward.

== Career ==
=== Under–21 ===
Müller made her debut for the Chile U–21 team in 2023, at the Pan American Junior Championship in St. Michael.

==== Las Diablas ====
Following a successful junior debut, Müller made her senior international debut for Las Diablas in 2023. She made her first appearance during a test series against South Africa in Santiago. Later that year she was named in the squad for the Pan American Games, also in Santiago.
