= Josefina Cambiaso =

Chilean field hockey player (born 1997)

Personal information
- Full name: Josefina Cambiaso Fischer
- Born: 23 April 1997 (age 29) Chile
- Height: 163 cm (5 ft 4 in)
- Weight: 54 kg (119 lb)

Sport
- Sport: Field hockey
- Position: Attacker
- Club: Cogs
National team
Years	Team	Caps	Goals
2018–	Chile	17	-
Medal record
Women's field hockey
Representing Chile
Hockey Series
Gold medal – first place	2018 Santiago	Open
South American Games
Bronze medal – third place	2018 Cochabamba	Team

Josefina Cambiaso (born 23 April 1997) is a Chilean field hockey player.

Cambiaso first represented Chile in the national senior team in 2018, in a test series against Canada. Cambiaso also represented the Chilean junior team at the 2016 Junior Pan American Cup and the 2016 Junior World Cup.

Cambiaso was part of the Chile team at the 2018 South American Games in Cochabamba, Bolivia. At the tournament, the team won a bronze medal, defeating Brazil in the third place playoff.
