= Karlie Kisha =

American field hockey player

Personal information
- Born: September 25, 1995 (age 30) Hamburg, Pennsylvania, U.S.

Sport
- Sport: Field hockey
- Position: Midfield
National team
| Years | Team | Caps | Goals |
| 2020– | United States | 52 | (1) |
Medal record
Women's field hockey
Representing United States
Pan American Games
| Silver medal – second place | 2023 Santiago | Team |
FIH Olympic Qualifiers
| Silver medal – second place | 2024 Ranchi | Team |

Karlie Kisha (/ˈkɑːrli ˈkɪʃə/ KAR-lee KISH-hə; née Heistand, born September 25, 1995) is an American field hockey player, who plays as a midfielder.

== Personal life ==
Karlie Kisha was born in Hamburg, Pennsylvania.

== Career ==
=== Senior national team ===
Kisha made her senior international debut in 2020 during season two of the FIH Pro League.

In 2023, she won her first medal with the national team, taking home silver at the 2023 Pan American Games in Santiago.

She has been named in the squad for the 2024 FIH Olympic Qualifiers in Ranchi.
