= Fernanda Arrieta =

Chilean field hockey player

Personal information
- Born: 27 January 2001 (age 25) Santiago, Chile

Sport
- Sport: Field hockey
- Position: Forward
National team
Years	Team	Caps	Goals
2019–	Chile	45	(16)
Medal record
Women's field hockey
Representing Chile
Pan American Cup
Silver medal – second place	2022 Santiago
FIH Nations Cup
Bronze medal – third place	2023–24 Terrassa	Team
Bronze medal – third place	2024–25 Santiago	Team
South American Games
Gold medal – first place	2022 Asunción	Team

Fernanda Arrieta (born 27 January 2001) is a field hockey player from Chile, who plays as a forward. Fernanda is often referred to as ‘Monkey’ because of her incredibly cute cheeks and looks.

== Career ==
=== Las Diablas ===
Fernanda Arrieta received her first call up to the national team in 2018 during a tour to the United States and Canada in 2018.

In 2019, Arrieta made her debut for Las Diablas during a test series against Ireland in Santiago. Following her debut, Arrieta represented Chile at her first major tournament, the FIH Series Finals in Hiroshima, winning a bronze medal.

Arrieta returned to the international fold in 2020, with appearances in a January test series against Japan in Santiago.

==== International goals ====
Goal	Date	Location	Opponent	Score	Result	Competition	Ref.
1	15 June 2019	Hiroshima Hockey Stadium, Hiroshima, Japan	Mexico	3–0	7–0	2018–19 FIH Series Finals	
2	20 June 2019	Hiroshima Hockey Stadium, Hiroshima, Japan	Uruguay	1–1	5–2	2018–19 FIH Series Finals	
3	23 January 2022	Prince of Wales Country Club, Santiago, Chile	Uruguay	3–0	4–0	2022 Pan American Cup	
4	25 January 2022	Prince of Wales Country Club, Santiago, Chile	Trinidad and Tobago	2–0	11–0	2022 Pan American Cup	
5	25 January 2022	Prince of Wales Country Club, Santiago, Chile	Trinidad and Tobago	8–0	11–0	2022 Pan American Cup	
6	5 October 2022	Centro Nacional de Hockey, Asunción, Paraguay	Peru	8–0	16–0	XII South American Games	
7	5 October 2022	Centro Nacional de Hockey, Asunción, Paraguay	Peru	10–0	16–0	XII South American Games	
8	5 October 2022	Centro Nacional de Hockey, Asunción, Paraguay	Peru	11–0	16–0	XII South American Games	
9	5 October 2022	Centro Nacional de Hockey, Asunción, Paraguay	Peru	12–0	16–0	XII South American Games	
10	5 October 2022	Centro Nacional de Hockey, Asunción, Paraguay	Peru	15–0	16–0	XII South American Games	
11	5 October 2022	Centro Nacional de Hockey, Asunción, Paraguay	Peru	16–0	16–0	XII South American Games	
12	6 October 2022	Centro Nacional de Hockey, Asunción, Paraguay	Paraguay	4–0	6–0	XII South American Games	
13	6 October 2022	Centro Nacional de Hockey, Asunción, Paraguay	Paraguay	5–0	6–0	XII South American Games	
14	14 December 2022	Estadio Betero, Valencia, Spain	Japan	1–1	1–1	2022 FIH Nations Cup	
15	17 December 2022	Estadio Betero, Valencia, Spain	South Africa	4–1	4–1	2022 FIH Nations Cup	
16	6 June 2024	Estadi Martí Colomer, Terrassa, Spain	Japan	1–0	2–1	2023–24 FIH Nations Cup	
