= Antonia Morales =

Chilean field hockey player (born 1997)

Antonia Morales Orchard
Personal information
- Full name: Antonia Morales Orchard
- Born: 31 July 1997 (age 29) Chile

Sport
- Sport: Field hockey
- Position: Midfield
National team
Years	Team	Caps	Goals
2015–2016	Chile U21	17	(1)
2023–	Chile	6	(0)
Medal record
Representing Chile
Women's field hockey
Pan American Games
Bronze medal – third place	2023 Santiago	Team
Pan American Junior Championship
Bronze medal – third place	2016 Tacarigua	Team

Antonia Morales Orchard (born 31 July 1997) is a Chilean field hockey player, who plays as a midfielder.

== Career ==
=== Under–21 ===
Morales was a member of the Chile U–21 team in 2016. She appeared at the Pan American Junior Championship in Tacarigua, winning a bronze medal. She followed this up with an appearance at the FIH Junior World Cup in Santiago later that year.

==== Las Diablas ====
After not making a national appearance for seven years, Morales finally made her senior international debut for Las Diablas in 2023. She made her first appearance during a test series against South Africa in Santiago. Later that year she was named in the squad for the Pan American Games, also in Santiago.
