= Chilean Field Hockey Federation =

Governing body of field hockey in Chile

Chilean Field Hockey Federation Federación Chilena de Hockey Sobre Césped
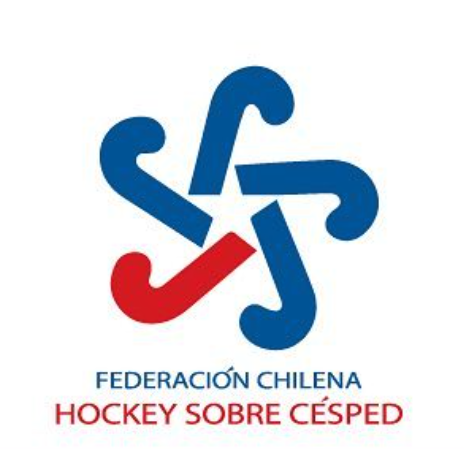
- Sport: Field Hockey
- Jurisdiction: Chile
- Affiliation: FIH
- Regional affiliation: PAHF
- President: Andrés De Witt Hepp

Official website
- www.chilehockey.cl
- (Chile)

The Chilean Field Hockey Federation (Spanish: Federación Chilena de Hockey Sobre Césped) is the governing body of field hockey in Chile. It is based in Santiago, was founded in 1981 by Rodolfo Westendarp, however, since 1962 field hockey in Chile was practiced at events in the city of Viña del Mar by British immigrants. The president is Andrés De Witt Hepp. It also runs the Chilean national teams for men and women.

== Directory ==
- President: Andrés De Witt Hepp
- Vice President: Paula Mackenzie
- General Secretary: Larry Sargent
