= María Barreiro =

Uruguayan field hockey player

Personal information
- Full name: María Belén Barreiro Mazali
- Born: 8 December 1999 (age 26) Uruguay
- Height: 165 cm (5 ft 5 in)
- Weight: 70 kg (154 lb)

Sport
- Sport: Field hockey
- Position: Defence
National team
Years	Team	Caps	Goals
2018–	Uruguay	12	(3)
2021	Uruguay U–21	4	(1)
Medal record
Representing Uruguay
Women's field hockey
Pan American Cup
Bronze medal – third place	2025 Montevideo
South American Games
Bronze medal – third place	2022 Asunción	Team
Bronze medal – third place	2026 Santa Fe	Team
Pan American Junior Championship
Silver medal – second place	2021 Santiago

María Belén Barreiro Mazali (born 8 December 1999) is a Uruguayan field hockey player, who plays as a defender.

== Career ==
=== Under–21 ===
Barreiro made her debut for the Uruguay U–21 at the 2021 Pan American Junior Championship in Santiago. At the tournament she won a silver medal, as well as scoring the team's only goal.

=== Las Cimarronas ===
Barriero made her senior international debut for Las Cimarronas in 2018, during the FIH Series Open in Santiago.

She won her first medal with the national team in 2022, taking home bronze at the South American Games in Asunción.

In 2023 she was named in the squad for the Pan American Games in Santiago.
