= Chile women's national field hockey team =

Chile
- Nickname(s): Las Diablas (The Devils)
- Association: Federación Chilena de Hockey Sobre Césped
- Confederation: PAHF (Americas)
- Head Coach: Cristobal Rodríguez
- Assistant coach(es): Diego Amoroso; Ignacio Huarte
- Manager: Esteban Krainz
- Captain: Manuela Urroz
Home	Away

FIH ranking
- Current: 15 (23 September 2026)

World Cup
- Appearances: 2 (first in 2022)
- Best result: 13th (2022)

Pan American Games
- Appearances: 7 (first in 1999)
- Best result: 3rd (2011)

Pan American Cup
- Appearances: 6 (first in 2004)
- Best result: 2nd (2017, 2022)

The Chile women's national field hockey team represents Chile in the international field hockey. The team is governed by the International Hockey Federation and the PAHF. The team is also known by the nickname "Las Diablas", which translates to "The Devils". It is controlled by the Chilean Hockey Federation. Chile is the second best ranked team from South America and is currently ranked 11th in the FIH World Rankings, with 2342 points.

== History ==
Hockey arrived in Chile in the middle of the 20th century. Chile's national team have had success at a continental level, but has never stemmed this worldwide. The team has never qualified for an Olympic Games, while they made their World Cup debut at the 2022 edition.

The Chilean women's most successful year came in 2017, with their silver medal performance at the 2017 Pan American Cup. The team made history by recording their first ever win over the United States in official competition, and progressing to the final for the first time.

Chile has medalled at one Pan American Games, in Guadalajara 2011. At the tournament, the team won a bronze medal after defeating Canada. Chile have narrowly missed medals at the event on three other occasions, finishing in fourth place.

Chile has also seen great success in its junior national team. The junior team has qualified for and competed in three Junior World Cups, and has medalled at four Pan American Junior Championships. Additionally, Chile qualified for their second Women's FIH Hockey World Cup by defeating Australia 1–0 in the final of the 2026 FIH Hockey World Cup Qualifiers held in Santiago. In a historic and dream-like performance on home soil, Las Diablas secured the title undefeated throughout the tournament, with Antonia Irazoqui scoring the decisive goal early in the match, backed by an outstanding defensive display and goalkeeping from Natalia Salvador. This victory not only marked their second consecutive World Cup appearance (following 2022) but also crowned them champions of the qualifiers, solidifying their rising status in international field hockey.

== Tournament records ==
World Cup
Year	Host city	Position
2022	Terrassa, Spain; Amstelveen, Netherlands	13th
2026	Wavre, Belgium; Amstelveen, Netherlands	16th

Pan American Cup
Year	Host city	Position
2004	(Barbados) Bridgetown, Jamaica	5th
2009	Hamilton, Bermuda	3rd
2013	Mendoza, Argentina	4th
2017	Lancaster, United States	2nd
2022	Santiago, Chile	2nd
2025	Montevideo, Uruguay	4th

South American Championship
Year	Host city	Position
2003	Santiago, Chile	2nd
2008	Montevideo, Uruguay	2nd
2010	Rio de Janeiro, Brazil	2nd
2013	Santiago, Chile	2nd
2016	Chiclayo, Peru	2nd

Nations Cup
Year	Host city	Position
2022	Valencia, Spain	7th
2023–24	Terrassa, Spain	3rd
2024–25	Santiago, Chile	3rd
2025–26	Auckland, New Zealand	4th

Pan American Games
Year	Host city	Position
1999	Winnipeg, Canada	6th
2003	Santo Domingo, Dominican Republic	4th
2007	Rio de Janeiro, Brazil	4th
2011	Guadalajara, Mexico	3rd
2015	Toronto, Canada	4th
2019	Lima, Peru	4th
2023	Santiago, Chile	3rd
2027	Lima, Peru	Qualified

South American Games
Year	Host city	Position
2006	Buenos Aires, Argentina	2nd
2014	Santiago, Chile	2nd
2018	Cochabamba, Bolivia	3rd
2022	Asunción, Paraguay	1st
2026	Santa Fe, Argentina	2nd

Hockey Series
Year	Round	Host city	Position
2018–19	Open	Santiago, Chile	1st
2018–19	Final	Hiroshima, Japan	3rd

World League
Year	Round	Host city	Position
2012–13	Round 2	Rio de Janeiro, Brazil	2nd
2012–13	Semi-final	Rotterdam, Netherlands	8th
2014–15	Round 2	(Republic of Ireland) Dublin, Ireland	3rd
2016–17	Round 1	Chiclayo, Peru	2nd
2016–17	Round 2	West Vancouver, Canada	2nd
2016–17	Semi-final	Johannesburg, South Africa	9th

== Current roster ==
Roster for the 2026 Women's FIH Hockey World Cup.

Head coach: Cristóbal Rodríguez

3. Fernanda Villagrán
4. Doménica Ananías
5. Denise Rojas
6. Fernanda Flores
7. Sofía Filipek
8. María Maldonado
9. Fernanda Arrieta
10. Manuela Urroz (C)
11. Josefa Salas
13. Antonia Orchard
15. Simone Avelli
16. Constanza Palma
17. Francisca Irazoqui
18. Laura Müller
19. Agustina Solano
22. Paula Valdivia
23. Florencia Barrios
28. Natalia Salvador (GK)
29. Antonia Sáez (GK)
31. Constanza Muñoz

== Squad records in official competitions ==
=== 2020-Present ===
Jersey #	Competitions													
Jersey #	2022				2023	2024		2025			2026			
Jersey #	PAC	WC	SAG	NC	PAG	OQ	NC	NC	PAC	BG	WCQ	NC	WC	SAG
1	Schüler													
2	Ananías													
3	Villagran							Villagran					Villagran	
4					Ananías						Ananías			
5	Rojas			Rojas										
6	Flores													
7	Filipek						Filipek			Filipek				
8											Maldonado			
9			Jacob					Arrieta F.						
10	Urroz													
11		Salas					Salas				Salas			
12							Wirth			Wirth				
13	Caram											Orchard		
14	Tala							Tala				Tala		
15	Lagos		Lagos			Arrieta					Avelli			
16	Palma					Palma								
17	de las Heras					de las Heras				de las Heras	Irazoqui F.			
18					Cerda			Müller			Müller		Müller	
19	Solano										Solano			
20		Parra					Parra							
21					Irazoqui F.			Irazoqui F.			Irazoqui A.			Irazoqui A.
22	Valdivia													
23											Barrios			
24	Lahsen													
25	Maldonado			Maldonado										
26	Arrieta F.													Obon
27				Martínez			Martínez							
28	Salvador										Salvador			
29				Araya	Avelli				Avelli	Sáez		Sáez		
30		Khamis												
31								Muñoz						
32										Pérez V.				
36					Orchard					Orchard				
41										Miranda				
42				Irazoqui F.										
45														Arrieta V.
47					Müller		Müller							
53									Pérez C.					
57									Araya					Araya
61										Valenzuela				
91							Gutiérrez							Gutiérrez
HC	Sergio Vigil							Cristobal Rodríguez						
Result	2nd place, silver medalist(s)	13th	1st place, gold medalist(s)	7th	3rd place, bronze medalist(s)	7th	3rd place, bronze medalist(s)		4th	1st place, gold medalist(s)		4th	16th	TBD

== Results ==
=== Fixtures and Results ===
==== Test Series ====
27 January 2026 Test 1	Argentina	3–1	Chile	Buenos Aires, Argentina

28 January 2026 Test 2	Argentina	2–0	Chile	Buenos Aires, Argentina

==== 2026 Women's FIH Hockey World Cup Qualifiers ====
2 March 2026 Pool A	Chile	6–0	Switzerland	Santiago, Chile
19:45	Urroz 20', 20'; Maldonado 26'; Rojas 42'; Arrieta 44'; Villagrán 48'	Report		Stadium: Estadio Nacional del Hockey Césped Claudia Schüler

4 March 2026 Pool A	Chile	2–1	Australia	Santiago, Chile
15:45	Salas 42'; Maldonado 60+'	Report	Kershaw 46'	Stadium: Estadio Nacional del Hockey Césped Claudia Schüler

5 March 2026 Pool A	France	0–1	Chile	Santiago, Chile
19:45		Report	Salas 8'	Stadium: Estadio Nacional del Hockey Césped Claudia Schüler

7 March 2026 Semi Final	Chile	1–1 (2–0 p)	Japan	Santiago, Chile
20:15	Ananías 59'	Report	Saito 14'	Stadium: Estadio Nacional del Hockey Césped Claudia Schüler
	Penalties
	Muñoz (penalty shoot-out missed); Ananías (penalty shoot-out scored); Valdivia (penalty shoot-out missed); Urroz (penalty shoot-out scored)		(penalty shoot-out missed) Kobayakawa; (penalty shoot-out missed) Nakagomi; (penalty shoot-out missed) Tanaka; (penalty shoot-out missed) Hasegawa

8 March 2026 Final	Chile	1–0	Australia	Santiago, Chile
20:15	A. Irazoqui 7'	Report		Stadium: Estadio Nacional del Hockey Césped Claudia Schüler

==== 2026 FIH Nations Cup ====
15 June 2026 Pool B	Chile	2–0	France	Auckland, New Zealand
15:45	Urroz 11'; Arrieta 57'	Report		Stadium: National Hockey Centre

16 June 2026 Pool B	Chile	2–3	New Zealand	Auckland, New Zealand
18:00	Maldonado 4'; Avelli 20'	Report	Shannon 32'; Pearson 37'; Murray 56'	Stadium: National Hockey Centre

18 June 2026 Pool B	South Korea	2–2	Chile	Auckland, New Zealand
15:45	Choi 16'; Lee Y. 29'	Report	Arrieta 1', 14'	Stadium: National Hockey Centre

20 June 2026 Semi finals	India	6–0	Chile	Auckland, New Zealand
16:00	Navneet 6', 13'; Deepika 14', 18'; Neha 32'; Rutuja 39'	Report		Stadium: National Hockey Centre

21 June 2026 3/4 Classification	Chile	2–3	United States	Auckland, New Zealand
16:00	Arrieta 26'; Maldonado 30'	Report	Sessa 12', 46'; Hoffman 34'	Stadium: National Hockey Centre

==== 2026 Women's FIH Hockey World Cup ====
15 August 2026 Pool A	Netherlands	2–0	Chile	Amstelveen, Netherlands
16:00	Veen 23'; Jansen 35'	Report		Stadium: Wagener Stadium

17 August 2026 Pool A	Chile	0–3	Japan	Amstelveen, Netherlands
09:30		Report	Hasegawa 8'; Murayama 17'; Ueno 22'	Stadium: Wagener Stadium

19 August 2026 Pool A	Chile	4–4	Australia	Amstelveen, Netherlands
09:30	Müller 34'; Urroz 47'; Barrios 53'; Villagran 55'	Report	Schonell 30'; Wilson 41'; Colwill 52'; Williams 60'	Stadium: Wagener Stadium

21 August 2026 Pool G	England	4–1	Chile	Amstelveen, Netherlands
09:30	Walker 5'; Bourne 29', 30'; Bingham 57'	Report	Valdivia 4'	Stadium: Wagener Stadium

23 August 2026 Pool G	Chile	2–3	South Africa	Amstelveen, Netherlands
10:00	Arrieta 13'; Avelli 51'	Report	Molikoe 22'; Mokoena 35'; Maree 48'	Stadium: Wagener Stadium

27 August 2026 15th place match	Chile	2–3	New Zealand	Wavre, Belgium
11:00	Urroz 37', 45'	Report	Cotter 10'; Pho 50'; Doar 57'	Stadium: Belfius Hockey Arena

==== 2026 South American Games ====
13 September 2026 Pool A	Chile	16–0	Paraguay	Santa Fe, Argentina
09:00	Villagran 6', 60'; F. Arrieta 11', 53', 54'; Maldonado 15', 45'; Urroz 18', 33', 44', 50'; Obon 21'; V. Arrieta 26'; Palma 34'; Gutierrez 55', 56'	Report		Stadium: Estadio Asociacion Santafesina de Hockey

15 September 2026 Pool A	Chile	13–0	Peru	Santa Fe, Argentina
10:00	Villagran 3', 23'; Maldonado 6', 21', 56'; F. Arrieta 8'; Irazoqui 15'; Urroz 17', 20', 30', 49'; V. Arrieta 39'; Gutierrez 41'	Report		Stadium: Estadio Asociacion Santafesina de Hockey

18 September 2026 Pool A	Chile	1–5	Argentina	Santa Fe, Argentina
12:00	Urroz 13'	Report	L. Pisthón 10'; Bruggesser 20'; Casas 40', 43'; Ambrosini 48'	Stadium: Estadio Asociacion Santafesina de Hockey

20 September 2026 Pool A	Uruguay	0–0	Chile	Santa Fe, Argentina
10:00		Report		Stadium: Estadio Asociacion Santafesina de Hockey

22 September 2026 Gold medal match	Argentina	5–0	Chile	Santa Fe, Argentina
15:45	Casas 5'; Palacio 27'; Andrade 28'; L. Pisthón 39', 55'	Report		Stadium: Estadio Asociacion Santafesina de Hockey

== See also ==
- Chile men's national field hockey team
- Chile women's national under-21 field hockey team
