= Natalia Salvador =

Chilean field hockey player

Personal information
- Full name: Natalia Belén Salvador Marambio
- Born: 28 September 1993 (age 32) Chile

Sport
- Sport: Field hockey
- Position: Goalkeeper
Senior career
Years	Team	Caps	Goals
–	Universidad Católica	-	-
2020–2022	Junior	-	-
2022	CHTC Damen	-	-
2023–2024	Universidad Católica	-	-
2024	RSTM	-	-
2025–	Soorma	-	-
National team
Years	Team	Caps	Goals
2012–	Chile	57	(0)
Medal record
Women's field hockey
Representing Chile
Pan American Games
Bronze medal – third place	2023 Santiago	Team
Pan American Cup
Silver medal – second place	2022 Santiago	Team
FIH Hockey Series
Bronze medal – third place	2018–19 Hiroshima	Team
FIH Nations Cup
Bronze medal – third place	2023–24 Terrassa	Team

Natalia Belén Salvador Marambio (born 28 September 1993) is a field hockey goalkeeper from Chile. She plays for Indian club Soorma.

== Career ==
=== Club hockey ===
Natalia Salvador is a former player of Chilean club, Universidad Católica.

In 2020, she moved to Spain to play for Junior in the Liga Iberdrola. In the second half of 2022, she moved to German club Crefelder HTC.

Back to Chile with Universidad Católica, she moved to Spain again in August 2024 to play for Real Sociedad de Tenis de la Magdalena.

In 2025, Salvador joined Hockey India League club Soorma.

=== National team ===
Natalia Salvador made her debut for the Chilean national team in 2012.

Since her debut, Salvador has been a constant inclusion in the national team. In 2019 she won a bronze medal with the team at the FIH Series Finals in Hiroshima. She also won silver at the 2022 Pan American Cup in Santiago.

In 2022, she was named in the national squad for the FIH World Cup in Terrassa and Amsterdam.
