= Jimena García =

Uruguayan field hockey player

Personal information
- Full name: Jimena García López
- Born: 2 January 2003 (age 23) Uruguay
- Height: 164 cm (5 ft 5 in)
- Weight: 57 kg (126 lb)

Sport
- Sport: Field hockey
- Position: Defence
National team
Years	Team	Caps	Goals
2021	Uruguay U–21	4	(0)
2021–2023	Uruguay	31	(5)
Medal record
Representing Uruguay
Women's field hockey
South American Games
Silver medal – second place	2018 Cochabamba	Team
Bronze medal – third place	2022 Asunción	Team
Pan American Junior Championship
Silver medal – second place	2021 Santiago	Team

Jimena García López (born 27 July 1999) is a Uruguayan field hockey player, who plays as a defender.

== Career ==
=== Under–21 ===
In 2021, García captained the Uruguay U–21 at the 2021 Pan American Junior Championship in Santiago, Chile, where she won a silver medal.

=== Las Cimarronas ===
García made her senior international debut for Las Cimarronas in 2018, at the 2018 South American Games in Cochabamba.

Throughout her career she has medalled with the national team twice, winning medals at the 2018 and 2022 editions of the South American Games. She won silver in Cochabamba in 2018, and bronze in Asunción in 2022.

In 2023 she was named in the squad for her second Pan American Games in Santiago, having represented Uruguay in 2019 in Lima.
