= Agustina Solano =

Argentine-born Chilean field hockey player

Personal information
- Full name: Agustina Solano García Tejera
- Born: 5 April 1995 (age 31) Argentina

Sport
- Sport: Field hockey
- Position: Attacker
- Club: Universidad Católica
Senior career
Years	Team	Caps	Goals
–2024	Universidad Católica	-	-
2024–	Zehlendorfer Wespen	-	-
National team
Years	Team	Caps	Goals
2017–	Chile	21	-
Medal record
Women's field hockey
Representing Chile
Pan American Games
Bronze medal – third place	2023 Santiago	Team
Pan American Cup
Silver medal – second place	2017 Lancaster
Silver medal – second place	2022 Santiago
FIH Nations Cup
Bronze medal – third place	2023–24 Terrassa	Team
South American Games
Bronze medal – third place	2018 Cochabamba	Team

Agustina Solano García Tejera (born 5 April 1995) is an Argentine-born Chilean field hockey player. She plays for German club Zehlendorfer Wespen.

== Career ==
=== Club hockey ===
In August 2024, Solano moved to Germany to play for Zehlendorfer Wespen.

=== National team ===
Solano made her junior debut at the 2016 Women's Pan-Am Junior Championship, where the team won a bronze medal. From this tournament, the team qualified for the 2016 Women's Hockey Junior World Cup, where Solano also represented Chile.

Solano made her international debut for the Chile senior team at the 2016-17 Hockey World League Semifinal in Johannesburg, South Africa.

Solano was part of the Chile team at the 2017 Women's Pan American Cup. At the tournament, the team recorded a historic 4–3 victory over the United States.
