= Josefa Salas =

Chilean field hockey player (born 1995)

Personal information
- Born: Josefa Salas Kuscevic; 9 October 1995 (age 30) Chile

Sport
- Sport: Field hockey
- Position: Midfielder
- Club: Sanse Complutense
Senior career
Years	Team	Caps	Goals
–2024	Universidad Católica	-	-
2024–	Sanse Complutense	-	-
National team
Years	Team	Caps	Goals
2013–	Chile	50	-
Medal record
Women's field hockey
Representing Chile
Pan American Cup
Silver medal – second place	2017 Lancaster	Team
FIH Nations Cup
Bronze medal – third place	2023–24 Terrassa	Team
South American Games
Silver medal – second place	2014 Santiago	Team
Bronze medal – third place	2018 Cochabamba	Team

Josefa Salas Kuscevic (born 10 October 1995) is a Chilean field hockey player. She plays for Spanish club Sanse Complutense.

== Career ==
=== Club hockey ===
In August 2024, Salas moved to Spain to play for Sanse Complutense.

=== National team ===
Salas first represented the Chile senior team at the 2013 Pan American Cup in Mendoza, Argentina. She made her junior debut at the 2016 Pan-Am Junior Championship.

Salas was part of the Chile team at the 2017 Pan American Cup. She scored the first goal in the team's historic 4–3 victory over the United States.
