= Kenzie Girgis =

Canadian field hockey player

Personal information
- Born: 10 June 2004 (age 22) Ottawa, Ontario, Canada
- Height: 157 cm (5 ft 2 in)

Sport
- Sport: Field hockey
- Position: Midfield
- Club: UBC Thunderbirds
National team
Years	Team	Caps	Goals
2023–	Canada U–21	5	(1)
2023–	Canada	12	(0)

Kenzie Girgis (born 10 June 2004) is a field hockey player from Canada, who plays as a midfielder.

== Personal life ==
Kenzie Girgis was born and raised in Ottawa, Ontario.

Girgis is a student at the University of British Columbia.

== Career ==
=== Junior national team ===
In 2023, Girgis made her debut for the Canada U–21 team at the Pan American Junior Championship in St. Michael.

=== Senior national team ===
Girgis made her debut for the Canadian senior team in 2023, during a test series against the United States in Charlotte. Following a successful debut series, Girgis was named in the squad for the Pan American Games in Santiago.
