= Simone Avelli =

Chilean field hockey player

Personal information
- Born: 6 May 2000 (age 26) Santiago, Chile

Sport
- Sport: Field hockey
- Position: Midfield
- Club: Prince of Wales Country Club
National team
Years	Team	Caps	Goals
2020–	Chile	2	(0)
2021–	Chile U21	4	(4)
Medal record
Women's field hockey
Representing Chile
Pan American Games
Bronze medal – third place	2023 Santiago	Team

Simone Avelli (born 6 May 2000) is a field hockey player from Chile, who plays as a midfielder.

== Career ==
=== Junior national team ===
Simone Avelli made her debut for the Chile U–21 team in 2021, during a test series against India in Santiago. Following her debut, Avelli was named in the Chile team for the Pan American Junior Championship, also in Santiago.

=== Las Diablas ===
Prior to her debut for the junior national team, Avelli made her first appearce for Las Diablas in early 2020, during a test series against Japan in Santiago.
