= Paula Valdivia =

Chilean field hockey player (born 1997)

Personal information
- Full name: Paula Valdivia Drayer
- Born: 5 June 1997 (age 29) Chile

Sport
- Sport: Field hockey
- Club: Zehlendorfer Wespen
Senior career
Years	Team	Caps	Goals
–2024	Manquehue	-	-
2024–	Zehlendorfer Wespen	-	-
National team
Years	Team	Caps	Goals
2016–	Chile	18	-
Medal record
Women's field hockey
Representing Chile
Pan American Games
Bronze medal – third place	2023 Santiago	Team
Pan American Cup
Silver medal – second place	2017 Lancaster
Silver medal – second place	2022 Santiago
FIH Nations Cup
Bronze medal – third place	2023–24 Terrassa	Team
South American Games
Bronze medal – third place	2018 Cochabamba	Team

Paula Valdivia Drayer (born 5 June 1997) is a Chilean field hockey player. She plays for German club Zehlendorfer Wespen.

== Career ==
=== Club hockey ===
In August 2024, Valdivia moved to Germany to play for Zehlendorfer Wespen.

=== National team ===
Valdivia has represented Chile at both senior and junior levels, making her debut for both teams in 2016.

In 2016, Valdivia represented the Chile national junior team at the 2016 Junior World Cup, where the team finished in 11th place.

Valdivia was also part of the Chile team at the 2017 Pan American Cup. At the tournament, Chile recorded a historic 4–3 victory over the United States, entering the final for the first time.

At the 2018 South American Games in Cochabamba, Bolivia, Valdivia was part of the Chile team that won a bronze medal.
