= María Maldonado (field hockey) =

Chilean field hockey player (born 1997)

Personal information
- Full name: María Jesús Maldonado Maira
- Born: 13 August 1997 (age 29) Chile

Sport
- Sport: Field hockey
- Position: Attacker
- Club: Sanse Complutense
Senior career
Years	Team	Caps	Goals
–2024	PWCC	-	-
2024–	Sanse Complutense	-	-
National team
Years	Team	Caps	Goals
2017–	Chile	30	-
Medal record
Women's field hockey
Representing Chile
Pan American Games
Bronze medal – third place	2023 Santiago	Team
Pan American Cup
Silver medal – second place	2017 Lancaster
Silver medal – second place	2022 Santiago
FIH Nations Cup
Bronze medal – third place	2023–24 Terrassa	Team
South American Games
Bronze medal – third place	2018 Cochabamba	Team

María Jesús Maldonado Maira (born 13 August 1997) is a Chilean field hockey player. She plays for Spanish club Sanse Complutense.

== Career ==
=== Club hockey ===
In August 2024, Maldonado moved to Spain to play for Sanse Complutense.

=== National team ===
Maldonado made her international debut for the Chile senior team in 2017 at a test series in Cape Town, South Africa.

Maldonado made her junior debut at the 2016 Pan-Am Junior Championship, where the team won a bronze medal. From this tournament, the team qualified for the 2016 Junior World Cup where Maldonado also represented Chile.

Maldonado was part of the Chile team at the 2017 Pan American Cup. At the tournament, the team recorded a historic 4–3 victory over the United States.

At the 2018 South American Games in Cochabamba, Bolivia, Maldonado represented Chile in the women's hockey tournament where the team won a bronze medal.

== Personal life ==
Her brother, José, also plays hockey and is a member of the Chilean men's national team.
