= Fernanda Villagrán =

Chilean field hockey player (born 1997)

Personal information
- Full name: Fernanda Villagrán Verdaguer
- Born: 12 August 1997 (age 29) Chile

Sport
- Sport: Field hockey
- Club: Manquehue
National team
| Years | Team | Caps | Goals |
| 2014– | Chile | 30 | - |
Medal record
Women's field hockey
Representing Chile
Pan American Games
| Bronze medal – third place | 2023 Santiago | Team |
Pan American Cup
| Silver medal – second place | 2017 Lancaster |
| Silver medal – second place | 2022 Santiago |

Fernanda Villagrán Verdaguer (born 12 August 1997) is a Chilean field hockey player.

Villagran has represented Chile at both senior and junior levels, making her debut for both teams in 2016.

In 2016, Villagran represented the Chile national junior team at the 2016 Junior World Cup, scoring two goals in the tournament. Chile finished in 11th place at the tournament.

Villagran was also part of the Chile team at the 2017 Pan American Cup. At the tournament, Chile recorded a historic 4–3 victory over the United States, entering the final for the first time.

Villagran last represented Chile in a 2018 test series against the United States in Lancaster, United States.
