= Field hockey at the 2023 Pan American Games – Women's tournament =

Women's field hockey at the 2023 Pan American Games
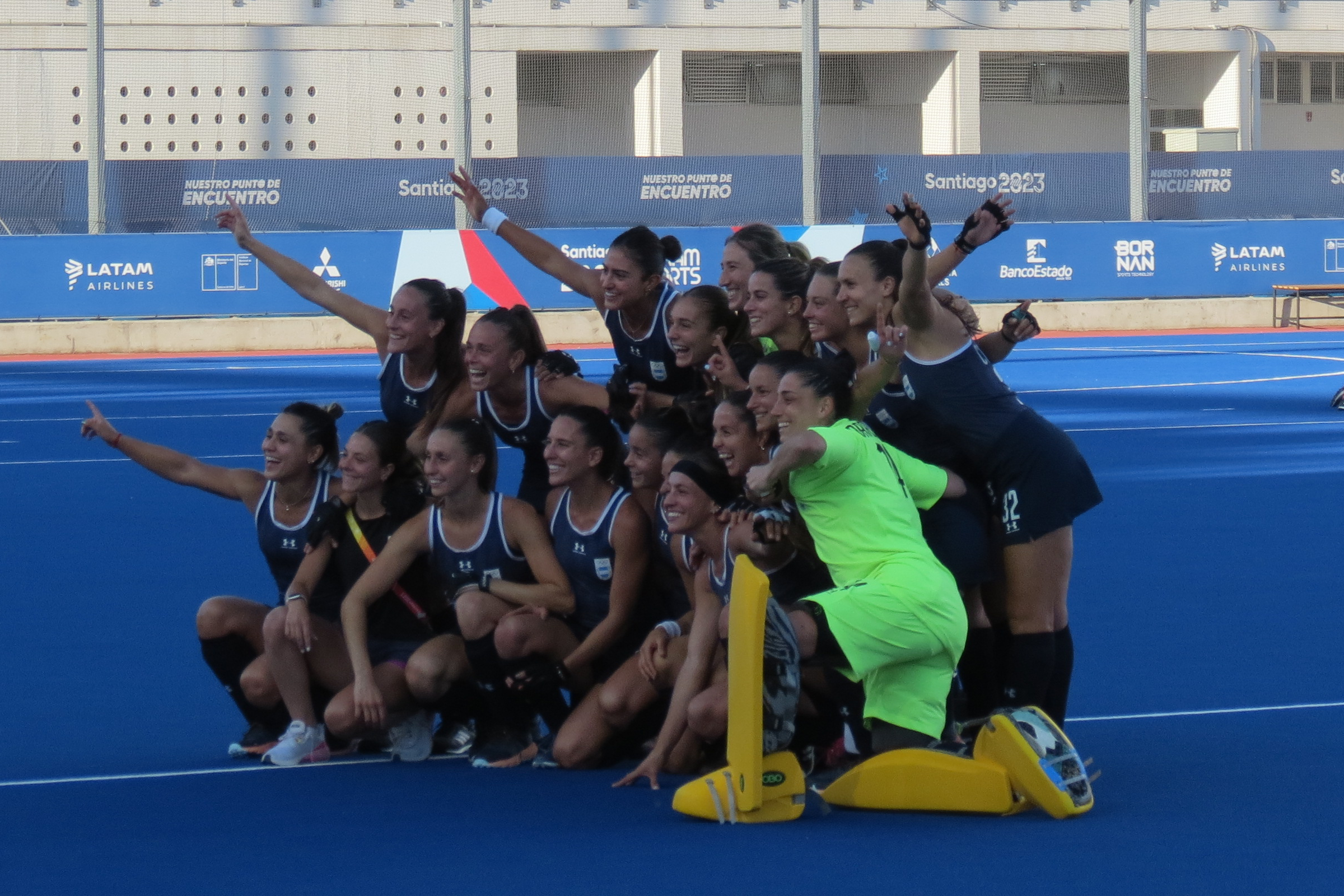
- Argentina (here posing after defeating Canada), champions

Tournament details
- Host country: Chile
- City: Santiago
- Dates: 26 October – 4 November
- Teams: 8 (from 1 confederation)
- Venue: Stadium Sports Park

Final positions
- Champions: Argentina (8th title)
- Runner-up: United States
- Third place: Chile

Tournament statistics
- Matches played: 20
- Goals scored: 111 (5.55 per match)
- Top scorer: (Argentina) Agustina Gorzelany (11 goals)

The women's field hockey tournament at the 2023 Pan American Games was the 10th edition of the field hockey event for women at the Pan American Games. It took place over a ten-day period beginning on 26 October, and culminating with the medal finals on 4 November.

The defending champions Argentina won their eighth title by defeating the United States 2–1 in the final. The hosts Chile won the bronze medal by defeating Canada 2–0. As winners, Argentina qualified directly for the 2024 Summer Olympics in Paris, France.

== Qualification ==
A total of eight teams qualified to compete at the games. As host nation, Chile were given automatic qualification. The top two teams at both the 2022 South American Games and 2023 Central American and Caribbean Games also qualified. The remaining qualification quotas came from the 2022 Pan American Cup. As Chile finished in the top two at the 2022 South American Games, their qualification quota was added to the 2022 Pan American Cup, meaning four teams qualified from the tournament. If Canada and/or the United States had still not qualified, a play-off between the nations and the third ranked at the Pan American Cups would have taken place. As both nations qualified, the play-off was not necessary and the next best placed team at each Pan American Cup (that has not already qualified) qualified. On 13 July 2023, the Pan American Hockey Federation announced the qualified teams and pools for the event.

=== Qualified teams ===
Qualification	Date	Host	Quota(s)	Qualified team
Host country	—N/a		~~1~~	—N/a
2022 Pan American Cup	19–29 January	(Chile) Santiago	~~2~~ 4	Canada; United States; Uruguay; Trinidad and Tobago
2022 South American Games	4–12 October	(Paraguay) Asunción	2	Chile; Argentina
2023 Central American and Caribbean Games	27 June – 5 July	(Dominican Republic) Santo Domingo	2	Mexico; Cuba
Total			8	

- Chile finished in the top two at the 2022 South American Games, meaning the host nation quota was reallocated as an additional quota through the 2022 Pan American Cup.
- Since Canada and the USA qualified through the Pan American Cup, an additional spot was available through the event.

== Preliminary round ==
All times are local (UTC−4).

=== Pool A ===
Pos	Team	Pld	W	D	L	GF	GA	GD	Pts	Qualification
1	Argentina	3	3	0	0	34	1	+33	9	Semi-finals
2	United States	3	2	0	1	19	5	+14	6	Semi-finals
3	Uruguay	3	1	0	2	11	11	0	3	5th–8th classification
4	Trinidad and Tobago	3	0	0	3	0	47	−47	0	5th–8th classification

Source: FIH
Rules for classification: 1) points; 2) matches won; 3) goal difference; 4) goals for; 5) head-to-head result; 6) field goals for.

26 October 2023
09:30

Argentina	8–0	Uruguay
Gorzelany 8', 15'; Jankunas 27', 43'; Granatto 29', 32'; Thome 35'; Trinchinetti 55'	Report

Umpires:
Ayanna McClean (TTO)
Meghan McClennan (CAN)

26 October 2023
11:30

United States	15–0	Trinidad and Tobago
Gonzales 2', 25'; Grega 11'; Hoffman 22', 28'; Zimmer 27'; Caarls 28', 29', 59'; Tamer 41', 47', 58'; Yeager 45'; Sessa 55'; Crouse 57'	Report

Umpires:
Natalia Lodeiro (URU)
Victoria Pazos (ARG)

28 October 2023
09:30

Uruguay	11–0	Trinidad and Tobago
Amadeo 13', 27', 29'; Viana 21', 21', 48', 53'; Algorta 26'; Vilar 31', 35', 58'	Report

Umpires:
Melina Illanes (ARG)
Claudia Montino (CHI)

28 October 2023
11:30

United States	1–5	Argentina
Grega 9'	Report	Granatto 13', 44'; Thome 22'; Gorzelany 50', 60'

Umpires:
Emi Yamada (JPN)
Ana Vázquez Escalanté (MEX)

30 October 2023
09:30

Argentina	21–0	Trinidad and Tobago
Campoy 9'; Cairó 12', 50'; Trinchinetti 17', 32'; Gorzelany 22', 23', 24', 36', 43', 58'; Raposo 27', 49'; Sauze 28'; Granatto 33', 40', 42'; Thome 40', 54'; Jankunas 43', 55'	Report

Umpires:
Victoria Pazos (ARG)
Emi Yamada (JPN)

30 October 2023
17:30

Uruguay	0–3	United States
	Report	Tamer 27'; Sholder 28'; Sessa 29'

Umpires:
Megan Robertson (CAN)
Melina Illanes (ARG)

=== Pool B ===
Pos	Team	Pld	W	D	L	GF	GA	GD	Pts	Qualification
1	Chile (H)	3	3	0	0	14	0	+14	9	Semi-finals
2	Canada	3	2	0	1	12	3	+9	6	Semi-finals
3	Cuba	3	0	1	2	2	10	−8	1	5th–8th classification
4	Mexico	3	0	1	2	1	16	−15	1	5th–8th classification

Source: FIH
Rules for classification: 1) points; 2) matches won; 3) goal difference; 4) goals for; 5) head-to-head result; 6) field goals for.
(H) Hosts

26 October 2023
17:30

Canada	7–1	Cuba
Thompson 3', 23', 60'; Walton 9', 39'; Rae 30', 46'	Report	Vera 54'

Umpires:
Maggie Giddens (USA)
Ana Vázquez Escalanté (MEX)

26 October 2023
19:30

Chile	10–0	Mexico
Rojas 6', 50'; Urroz 16', 20', 29', 50'; Villagrán 38', 58', 59'; Tala 55'	Report

Umpires:
Emi Yamada (JPN)
Melina Illanes (ARG)

28 October 2023
17:30

Mexico	1–1	Cuba
Cardiel 34'	Report	Vera 24'

Umpires:
Meghan McLennan (CAN)
Megan Robertson (CAN)

28 October 2023
19:30

Canada	0–2	Chile
	Report	Caram 43'; Müller 44'

Umpires:
Maggie Giddens (USA)
Victoria Pazos (ARG)

30 October 2023
11:30

Mexico	0–5	Canada
	Report	Johansen 13', 33', 56'; McManus 19'; Sawers 39'

Umpires:
Ayanna McClean (TTO)
Claudia Montino (CHI)

30 October 2023
19:30

Chile	2–0	Cuba
Villagrán 9'; Rojas 50'	Report

Umpires:
Natalia Lodeiro (URU)
Ana Vázquez Esclanté (MEX)

== Fifth to eighth place classification ==
=== Bracket ===
Cross-overs
2 November
Uruguay	3
Mexico	0
2 November
Cuba	1
Trinidad and Tobago	0

Fifth place
4 November
Uruguay	3
Cuba	0
Seventh place
4 November
Mexico	0
Trinidad and Tobago	1

=== Cross-overs ===
2 November 2023
09:30

Uruguay	3–0	Mexico
Amadeo 17'; Viana 25', 36'	Report

Umpires:
Meghan McClennan (CAN)
Ayanna McClean (TTO)

2 November 2023
11:45

Cuba	1–0	Trinidad and Tobago
Martínez 28'	Report

Umpires:
Claudia Montino (CHI)
Natalia Lodeiro (URU)

=== Seventh and eighth place ===
4 November 2023
09:30

Mexico	0–1	Trinidad and Tobago
	Report	Thompson 14'

Umpires:
Natalia Lodeiro (URU)
Claudia Montino (CHI)

=== Fifth and sixth place ===
4 November 2023
11:45

Uruguay	3–0	Cuba
Algorta 19'; Amadeo 28'; Curutchague 42'	Report

Umpires:
Meghan McLennan (CAN)
Victoria Pazos (ARG)

== Medal round ==
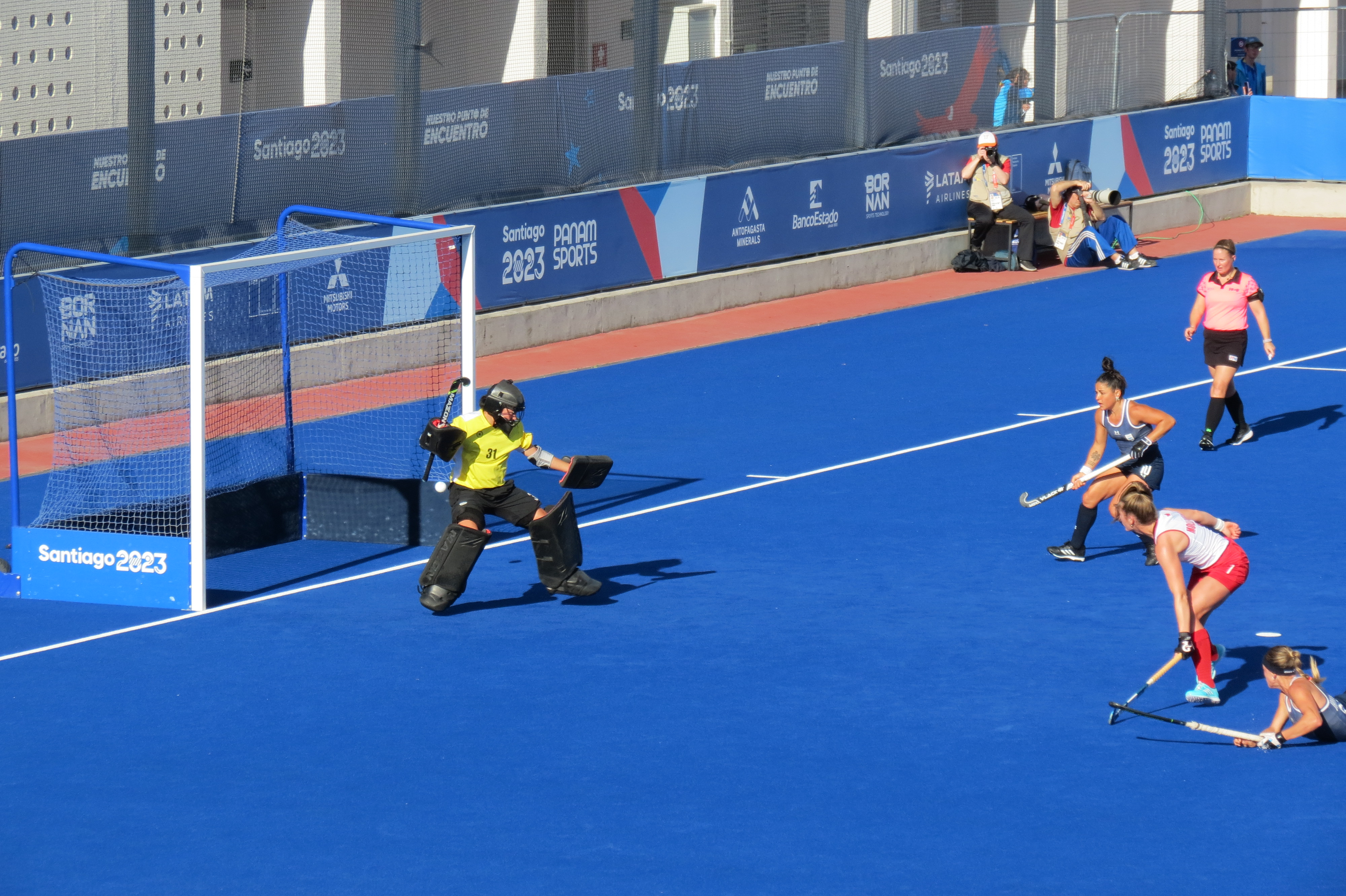
A moment of the Argentina v Canadá match

=== Bracket ===
Semi-finals
2 November
Argentina	3
Canada	0
2 November
Chile	1 (1)
United States	1 (3)

Gold medal match
4 November
Argentina	2
United States	1
Bronze medal match
4 November
Canada	0
Chile	2

=== Semi-finals ===
2 November 2023
17:30

Argentina	3–0	Canada
Thome 26'; Jankunas 28'; Raposo 44'	Report

Umpires:
Maggie Giddens (USA)
Ana Vázquez Escalanté (MEX)

2 November 2023
19:45

Chile	1–1	United States
Rojas 46'	Report	Sessa 12'
Penalties
Avelli (penalty shoot-out scored); Ananías (penalty shoot-out missed); Müller (penalty shoot-out missed); Urroz (penalty shoot-out missed)	1–3	(penalty shoot-out scored) Sessa; (penalty shoot-out scored) Sessa; (penalty shoot-out scored) Tamer

Umpires:
Melina Illanes (ARG)
Megan Robertson (CAN)

=== Bronze medal match ===
4 November 2023
17:30

Canada	0–2	Chile
	Report	Rojas 2', 46'

Umpires:
Maggie Giddens (USA)
Ayanna McClean (TTO)

=== Gold medal match ===
4 November 2023
19:45

Argentina	2–1	United States
Gorzelany 12'; Trinchinetti 51'	Report	Sessa 30'

Umpires:
Emi Yamada (JPN)
Megan Robertson (CAN)

Team details

Argentina
United States

GK	14	Clara Barberi
DF	2	Sofía Toccalino
DF	3	Agustina Gorzelany
DF	4	Valentina Raposo
DF	32	Valentina Costa Biondi
MF	5	Agostina Alonso
MF	17	Rocío Sánchez Moccia (c)
MF	22	Eugenia Trinchinetti
MF	26	Pilar Campoy
FW	10	María José Granatto	(yellow card) 56'
FW	28	Julieta Jankunas	20' (yellow card) 49'
Substitutions:
FW	11	Delfina Thome		(substituted on) 4'
MF	18	Victoria Sauze		(substituted on) 4'
MF	20	Sofía Cairó		(substituted on) 5'
DF	50	Juana Castellaro		(substituted on) 6'
Manager:
(Argentina) Fernando Ferrara

GK	31	Kelsey Bing
DF	13	Ashley Hoffman
DF	21	Alexandra Hammel
MF	16	Linnea Gonzales
MF	2	Meredith Sholder	49'
MF	3	Ashley Sessa
MF	25	Karlie Kisha
MF	12	Amanda Golini
FW	1	Abigail Tamer
FW	9	Madeleine Zimmer
FW	20	Leah Crouse
Substitutions:
FW	4	Danielle Grega		(substituted on) 4'
DF	7	Jillian Wolgemuth		(substituted on) 4'
MF	14	Sanne Caarls		(substituted on) 3'
MF	17	Elizabeth Yeager		(substituted on) 3'
MF	27	Emma DeBerdine		(substituted on) 3'
Manager:
(United States) David Passmore

== Statistics ==
=== Final standings ===
Pos	Team	Qualification
1st place, gold medalist(s)	Argentina	2024 Summer Olympics
2nd place, silver medalist(s)	United States	2024 FIH Hockey Olympic Qualifiers
3rd place, bronze medalist(s)	Chile (H)	2024 FIH Hockey Olympic Qualifiers
4	Canada	2024 FIH Hockey Olympic Qualifiers
5	Uruguay	
6	Cuba	
7	Trinidad and Tobago	
8	Mexico	

Source: FIH
(H) Host

=== Goalscorers ===
There were 111 goals scored in 20 matches, for an average of 5.55 goals per match.

11 goals

- (Argentina) Agustina Gorzelany

7 goals

- (Argentina) María Granatto

6 goals

- (Chile) Denise Rojas
- (Uruguay) Teresa Viana

5 goals

- (Argentina) Julieta Jankunas
- (Argentina) Delfina Thome
- (Uruguay) Sol Amadeo

4 goals

- (Argentina) Eugenia Trinchinetti
- (Chile) Manuela Urroz
- (Chile) Fernanda Villagrán
- (United States) Ashley Sessa
- (United States) Abigail Tamer

3 goals

- (Argentina) Valentina Raposo
- (Canada) Karli Johansen
- (Canada) Madison Thompson
- (United States) Sanne Caarls
- (Uruguay) Manuela Vilar

2 goals

- (Argentina) Sofía Cairó
- (Canada) Thora Rae
- (Canada) Chloe Walton
- (Cuba) Yuraima Vera
- (United States) Linnea Gonzales
- (United States) Danielle Grega
- (United States) Ashley Hoffman
- (Uruguay) Milagros Algorta

1 goal

- (Argentina) Pilar Campoy
- (Argentina) Victoria Sauze
- (Canada) Sara McManus
- (Canada) Audrey Sawers
- (Chile) Camila Caram
- (Chile) Laura Müller
- (Chile) Francisca Tala
- (Cuba) Jennifer Martínez
- (Mexico) Dariana Cardiel
- (Trinidad and Tobago) Gabrielle Thompson
- (United States) Leah Crouse
- (United States) Meredith Sholder
- (United States) Elizabeth Yeager
- (United States) Madeleine Zimmer
- (Uruguay) Guadalupe Curutchague

Source: FIH
