= Women's FIH Hockey Nations Cup =

Women's field hockey tournament

- Current season, competition or edition: 2025–26 Women's FIH Hockey Nations Cup
- Sport: Field hockey
- Founded: 2019; 7 years ago
- First season: 2022
- No. of teams: 8
- Most recent champion: India (2nd title) (2025–26)
- Most titles: India (2 titles)
- Promotion to: FIH Pro League
- Relegation to: FIH Hockey Nations Cup 2

The Women's FIH Hockey Nations Cup is an international women's field hockey tournament organised annually by the International Hockey Federation. The tournament serves as the qualification tournament for the Women's FIH Pro League.

The tournament was founded in 2019 and the first edition was held in December 2022 in Valencia, Spain. In June 2026, the tournament was expanded to ten teams competing, starting with the 2026–27 season.

== Format ==
The tournament features the eight highest ranked teams in the FIH Women's World Ranking not participating in the Women's FIH Pro League. The winner of the tournament will be promoted to the following year's FIH Pro League to replace the bottom team who will be relegated. The team will only be promoted if they meet the necessary requirements for participation in the Pro League. The winner of the first edition will qualify for the 2023–24 season of the FIH Pro League.

== Results ==
Year	Host	Final			Third place game			Number of teams
Year	Host	Winner	Score	Runner-up	Third place	Score	Fourth place	Number of teams
2022	Valencia, Spain	India	1–0	Spain	Japan	3–2	Ireland	8
2023–24	Terrassa, Spain	Spain	2–0	Ireland	Chile	2–1	New Zealand	8
2024–25	Santiago, Chile	New Zealand	1–1 (4–2 pen.)	Ireland	Chile	2–1	United States	8
2025–26	Auckland, New Zealand	India	2–0	New Zealand	United States	3–2	Chile	8

== Summary ==
Team	Winners	Runners-up	Third place	Fourth place
India	2 (2022, 2025–2026)			
New Zealand	1 (2024–25)	1 (2025–2026*)		1 (2023–24)
Spain	1 (2023–24*)	1 (2022*)		
Ireland		2 (2023–24, 2024–25)		1 (2022)
Chile			2 (2023–24, 2024–25*)	1 (2025–26)
United States			1 (2025–26)	1 (2024–25)
Japan			1 (2022)	

* = host country

== Team appearances ==
Team	(Spain) 2022	(Spain) 2023–24	(Chile) 2024–25	(New Zealand) 2025–26	2026–27	Total
Canada	WD	6th	8th ▼	–	–	2
Chile	7th	3rd	3rd	4th	Q	5
France	–	–	–	7th	Q	2
India	1st ▲	–	–	1st ▲	–	2
Ireland	4th	2nd	2nd ▲ (Note: New Zealand withdrew and were replaced by Ireland to the 2025–26 Women's FIH Pro League.)	–	Q	4
Italy	5th	7th	–	–	Q	3
Japan	3rd	5th	6th	6th	Q	5
New Zealand	–	4th	1st	2nd	Q	4
Scotland	–	–	5th	WD	–	1
South Africa	8th	–	–	–	Q	2
South Korea	6th	8th	7th	5th	Q	5
Spain	2nd	1st ▲	–	–	–	2
Uruguay	–	–	–	8th	Q	2
United States	–	–	4th	3rd	Q	3
Total	8	8	8	8	10	

== See also ==
- Men's FIH Hockey Nations Cup
- Women's FIH Pro League
- Women's FIH Hockey Nations Cup 2
