= Peru women's national field hockey team =

Peru
- Association: Federación Deportiva Peruana de Hockey
- Confederation: PAHF (Americas)
- Head Coach: Patricio Martinez
- Assistant coach(es): Tito Cantuarias
- Manager: Fatima Ramos
- Captain: Camila Mendez
Home	Away

FIH ranking
- Current: 46 ▼3 (21 September 2026)

Pan American Games
- Appearances: 1 (first in 2019)
- Best result: 7th (2019)

Pan American Cup
- Appearances: 1 (first in 2022)
- Best result: 7th (2022)
Medal record
Bolivarian Games
Silver medal – second place	2013 Chiclayo	Team

The Peru women's national field hockey team represents Peru in women's international field hockey and is organized by the Federación Deportiva Peruana de Hockey, the governing body of field hockey in Peru.

Peru has never qualified for the Summer Olympics, the World Cup. In 2019 they appeared in their first Pan American Games. After they won the 2021 Women's Pan American Challenge they qualified for their first ever Women's Pan American Cup in 2022.

== Tournament record ==
=== Pan American Games ===
- 2019 – 7th place

=== Pan American Cup ===
- 2022 – 7th place

=== Pan American Challenge ===
- 2015 – (bronze)
- 2021 – (gold)
- 2024 – Qualified

=== South American Games ===
- 2018 – 7th place
- 2022 – 5th place
- 2026 – 5th place

=== South American Championship ===
- 2003 – 5th place
- 2013 – 6th place
- 2016 – 5th place

=== Hockey World League ===
- 2014–15 – Round 1
- 2016–17 – Round 1

=== FIH Hockey Series ===
- 2018–19 – First round

=== Bolivarian Games ===
- 2013 – (silver)

== Results and fixtures ==
The following is a list of match results in the last 12 months, as well as any future matches that have been scheduled.

Win Draw Loss Fixture

=== 2026 ===
13 September 2026 2026 ODESUR Pool A	Uruguay	12–0	Peru	Santa Fe, Argentina
13:00	Vilar 1', 4', 28', 39', 40'; Cristiani 1'; Rago 15'; Díaz 22', 25', 32'; Quinones 34', 55'	Report		Stadium: Estadio Asociacion Santafesina de Hockey

15 September 2026 2026 ODESUR Pool A	Chile	13–0	Peru	Santa Fe, Argentina
10:00	Villagran 3', 23'; Maldonado 6', 21', 56'; F. Arrieta 8'; Irazoqui 15'; Urroz 17', 20', 30', 49'; V. Arrieta 39'; Gutierrez 41'	Report		Stadium: Estadio Asociacion Santafesina de Hockey

16 September 2026 2026 ODESUR Pool A	Peru	1–4	Paraguay	Santa Fe, Argentina
12:00	Mendez 57'	Report	Penayo 21', 50'; Doldan 24'; Orquiola 56'	Stadium: Estadio Asociacion Santafesina de Hockey

20 September 2026 2026 ODESUR Pool A	Argentina	19–1	Peru	Santa Fe, Argentina
14:00	Pacheco 5', 26'; Díaz 9', 10', 27', 57'; Andrade 12', 35', 48'; Cairó 16'; Alastra 17', 48'; Ambrosini 48', 52'; L. Pisthón 32', 45'; Casas 42'; Pagella 47'; Bruggesser 58'	Report	Montes 59'	Stadium: Estadio Asociacion Santafesina de Hockey

== See also ==
- Peru men's national field hockey team
