= Paraguay women's national field hockey team =

Paraguay
- Nickname(s): Las Aguará
- Association: Paraguayan Hockey Association (Asociación Paraguaya de Hockey)
- Confederation: PAHF (Americas)

FIH ranking
- Current: 43 ▲1 (23 September 2026)

Pan American Games
- Appearances: 1 (first in 1995)
- Best result: 7th (1995)

Pan American Cup
- Appearances: 1 (first in 2025)
- Best result: 7th (2025)

The Paraguay women's national field hockey team represent Paraguay in women's international field hockey competitions and is controlled by the Paraguayan Hockey Association, the governing body for field hockey in Paraguay.

Paraguay has never qualified for the Pan American Cup but they have participated once in the Pan American Games in 1995.

== Tournament record ==
=== Pan American Games ===
- 1995 – 7th place

=== South American Games ===
- 2014 – 5th place
- 2018 – 5th place
- 2022 – 4th place
- 2026 – 4th place

=== South American Championship ===
- 2003 – 4th place
- 2008 – 6th place
- 2010 – 5th place
- 2013 – 5th place
- 2016 – 4th place

=== Pan American Cup ===
- 2025 – 7th place

=== Pan American Challenge ===
- 2011 – 4th place
- 2021 – (bronze)
- 2024 – (silver)

=== Hockey World League ===
- 2016–17 – Round 1

=== FIH Hockey Series ===
- 2018–19 – First round

== Current squad ==
This is the list of players announced for the ODESUR 2026.

Head coach: Pablo Mendoza

1. Sófia Caballero (GK)
3. Micaela Gómez (C)
5. Victoria Penayo
7. Maria Florentin
8. Ximena Doldán
9. Sara Orquiola
10. Larissa Barreto
11. Bella López
12. Dulce Ayala
20. Astrid Duarte
22. Amira Portillo
23. Elaine Rodríguez (GK)
25. Ximena Llano
28. Arumi González
38. Lilian Acuna
42. Bianca Lagraña

== Results and fixtures ==
The following is a list of match results in the last 12 months, as well as any future matches that have been scheduled.

Win Draw Loss Fixture

=== 2026 ===
13 September 2026 2026 ODESUR Pool A	Chile	16–0	Paraguay	Santa Fe, Argentina
19:00	Villagran 6', 60'; F. Arrieta 11', 53', 54'; Maldonado 15', 45'; Urroz 18', 33', 44', 50'; Obon 21'; V. Arrieta 26'; Palma 34'; Gutierrez 55', 56'	Report		Stadium: Estadio Asociacion Santafesina de Hockey

14 September 2026 2026 ODESUR Pool A	Argentina	14–0	Paraguay	Santa Fe, Argentina
10:00	Díaz 4', 22'; Palacio 11', 41'; Casas 14', 21', 53'; Bruggesser 19', 25'; Pisthon 27'; Andrade 28', 54'; Alastra 45', 60'	Report		Stadium: Estadio Asociacion Santafesina de Hockey

16 September 2026 2026 ODESUR Pool A	Peru	1–4	Paraguay	Santa Fe, Argentina
12:00	Mendez 57'	Report	Penayo 21', 50'; Doldan 24'; Orquiola 56'	Stadium: Estadio Asociacion Santafesina de Hockey

19 September 2026 2026 ODESUR Pool A	Paraguay	0–13	Uruguay	Santa Fe, Argentina
10:00		Report	Vilar 8'; Luis 9'; Díaz 20', 34'; Cristiani 23'; Curutchague 27'; Rago 28'; Seigal 30'; Rodriguez 36', 48', 49', 51'; Barreiro 54'	Stadium: Estadio Asociacion Santafesina de Hockey

22 September 2026 2026 ODESUR Bronze medal match	Uruguay	9–0	Paraguay	Santa Fe, Argentina
11:15	Vilar 8', 26', 45'; Cristiani 12'; Seigal 22'; J. Curutchague 28'; Quinones 33', 35'; L. Curutchague 39'	Report		Stadium: Estadio Asociacion Santafesina de Hockey

== See also ==
- Paraguay men's national field hockey team
