= Field hockey at the 2025 Junior Pan American Games =

Field hockey at the 2025 Junior American Games
- Venue: National Hockey Center
- Start date: August 10, 2025
- End date: August 19, 2025
- No. of events: 2 (1 men, 1 women)
- Competitors: 256 from 10 nations

The field hockey tournaments at the 2025 Junior Pan American Games were held at the National Hockey Center, located in the Olympic Park in Luque.

This was the debut of the sport at these games. Two different tournaments were played, one for men and one for women, whose winners qualified directly for the 2027 Pan American Games.

== Qualification ==
=== Summary ===
Nation	Men's	Women's	Athletes
Argentina	Yes	Yes	32
Brazil	Yes		16
Canada	Yes	Yes	32
Chile	Yes	Yes	32
Guyana		Yes	16
Mexico	Yes	Yes	32
Paraguay	Yes	Yes	32
Trinidad and Tobago	Yes		16
United States	Yes	Yes	32
Uruguay		Yes	16
Total: 10 NOCs	8	8	256

=== Men's qualification ===
Qualification	Date	Host/Country	Berths	Qualified team
Host country	—N/a		1	Paraguay
2024 Junior Pan American Championship	3–12 July 2024	Surrey	5	Argentina; Canada; Chile; Mexico; United States
2025 Junior Pan American Challenge	8–16 March 2025	Bridgetown	2	Brazil; Trinidad and Tobago
Total			8	

=== Women's qualification ===
Qualification	Date	Host/Country	Berths	Qualified team
Host country	—N/a		1	Paraguay
2024 Junior Pan American Championship	3–12 July 2024	Surrey	5	Argentina; Canada; Chile; United States; Uruguay
2025 Junior Pan American Challenge	8–16 March 2025	Bridgetown	2	Mexico; ~~Puerto Rico~~; Guyana
Total			8	

== Medal summary ==
=== Medal table ===
* Host nation (Paraguay)

Rank	Nation	Gold	Silver	Bronze	Total
1	Argentina	2	0	0	2
2	Canada	0	1	0	1
2	United States	0	1	0	1
4	Chile	0	0	2	2
Totals (4 entries)		2	2	2	6

=== Medalists ===
Event	Gold	Silver	Bronze
Men's tournament	Argentina; Matías Andreotti; Joaquin Barberis; Juan Boretti; Bruno Correa; Joaquín Costa; Luciano Del Pozo; Juan Fernández; Santiago Fernández; Lautaro Martínez; Nicolás Rodríguez; Joaquin Ruiz Saporiti; Tomás Ruiz; Mateo Serrano; Lorenzo Somaini; Mateo Torrigiani; Thiago Zalazar	Canada; Parmveer Basra; Caleb Fitch; Christopher Chalut; Harjas Sanghera; Gurwinder Brar; Morgan Garside; Brooklyn Aranha; Josiah Campbell; Navdip Chandi; Leighton De Souza; Satpreet Dhadda; Ravpreet Gill; Kirin Robinson; Sawyer Ross; Kale Simonson; Grant Simpson	Chile; Bruno Acevedo; Gaspar Carvajal; Felipé Duisberg; Ignacio Fariña; Gaspar Fosalba; Tomás Hasson; Sebastian Loehnert; Lucas Luders; Santiago Pizarro; Felipé Richard; Axel Stein; Tomás Taborga; León Taladriz; Nicolás Troncoso; Javier Vargas; Vicente Wilhelmy
Women's tournament	Argentina; Milagros Alastra; Mercedes Artola; Lara Casas; Juana Castellaro; Maria Di Santo; Maxima Duportal; Victoria Falasco; Sol Guignet; Carolina Lardies; Delfina Mussari; Sol Olalla; Delfina Persoglia; Lourdes Pisthón; Pilar Pisthón; Barbara Raposo; Catalina Stamati	United States; Ella Beach; Madison Beach; Isabella Bianco; Maci Bradford; Milaw Clause; Sofia Ferri; Alyssa Klebasko; Lauren Masters; Olivia McKenna; Alaina McVeigh; Ava Moore; Mia Myklebust; Talia Schenk; Macy Szukics; Gia Whalen; Rylie Wollerton	Chile; Montserrat Araya; Trinidad Barrios; Victoria Arrieta; Florencia Barrios; Isidora Caravia; Camila González; Josefina Gutiérrez; Josefa Luders; Sofía Messen; Laura Müller; Maite Parada; Dominga Pérez; Catalina Rojas; Javiera Sáenz; Laura Salamanca; Jacinta Solari

== Men's tournament ==
=== Group stage ===
==== Group A ====
Pos	Team	Pld	W	D	L	GF	GA	GD	Pts	Qualification
1	Argentina	3	3	0	0	39	0	+39	9	Semi-finals
2	United States	3	2	0	1	9	11	−2	6	Semi-finals
3	Brazil	3	0	1	2	3	15	−12	1	
4	Paraguay (H)	3	0	1	2	2	27	−25	1	

Source: FIH
Rules for classification: 1) points; 2) matches won; 3) goal difference; 4) goals for; 5) head-to-head result; 6) field goals for.
(H) Hosts

==== Group B ====
Pos	Team	Pld	W	D	L	GF	GA	GD	Pts	Qualification
1	Canada	3	2	0	1	11	5	+6	6	Semi-finals
2	Chile	3	2	0	1	7	3	+4	6	Semi-finals
3	Mexico	3	1	0	2	5	8	−3	3	
4	Trinidad and Tobago	3	1	0	2	4	11	−7	3	

Source: FIH
Rules for classification: 1) points; 2) matches won; 3) goal difference; 4) goals for; 5) head-to-head result; 6) field goals for.

=== Medal round ===
Semi-finals
16 August
Argentina	5
Chile	0
16 August
United States	0
Canada	1

Final
18 August
Argentina	4
Canada	2
Third place
18 August
Chile	4
United States	2

=== Final standings ===
Pos	Team	Qualification
1st place, gold medalist(s)	Argentina	2027 Pan American Games
2nd place, silver medalist(s)	Canada	
3rd place, bronze medalist(s)	Chile	
4	United States	
5	Mexico	
6	Brazil	
7	Trinidad and Tobago	
8	Paraguay (H)	

Source: FIH
(H) Host

== Women's tournament ==
=== Group stage ===
==== Group A ====
Pos	Team	Pld	W	D	L	GF	GA	GD	Pts	Qualification
1	Argentina	3	3	0	0	21	0	+21	9	Semi-finals
2	Uruguay	3	2	0	1	5	3	+2	6	Semi-finals
3	Canada	3	1	0	2	2	9	−7	3	
4	Paraguay (H)	3	0	0	3	0	16	−16	0	

Source: FIH
Rules for classification: 1) points; 2) matches won; 3) goal difference; 4) goals for; 5) head-to-head result; 6) field goals for.
(H) Hosts

==== Group B ====
Pos	Team	Pld	W	D	L	GF	GA	GD	Pts	Qualification
1	United States	3	3	0	0	23	0	+23	9	Semi-finals
2	Chile	3	2	0	1	16	7	+9	6	Semi-finals
3	Mexico	3	1	0	2	11	13	−2	3	
4	Guyana	3	0	0	3	2	32	−30	0	

Source: FIH
Rules for classification: 1) points; 2) matches won; 3) goal difference; 4) goals for; 5) head-to-head result; 6) field goals for.

=== Medal round ===
Semi-finals
17 August
Argentina	4
Chile	1
17 August
Uruguay	1
United States	2

Final
19 August
Argentina	3
United States	0
Bronze medal
19 August
Chile (p.s.o.)	0 (3)
Uruguay	0 (2)

=== Final standings ===
Pos	Team	Qualification
1st place, gold medalist(s)	Argentina	2027 Pan American Games
2nd place, silver medalist(s)	United States	
3rd place, bronze medalist(s)	Chile	
4	Uruguay	
5	Canada	
6	Mexico	
7	Paraguay (H)	
8	Guyana	

Source: FIH
(H) Host
