= 2026 Women's FIH Hockey World Cup final =

International field hockey match

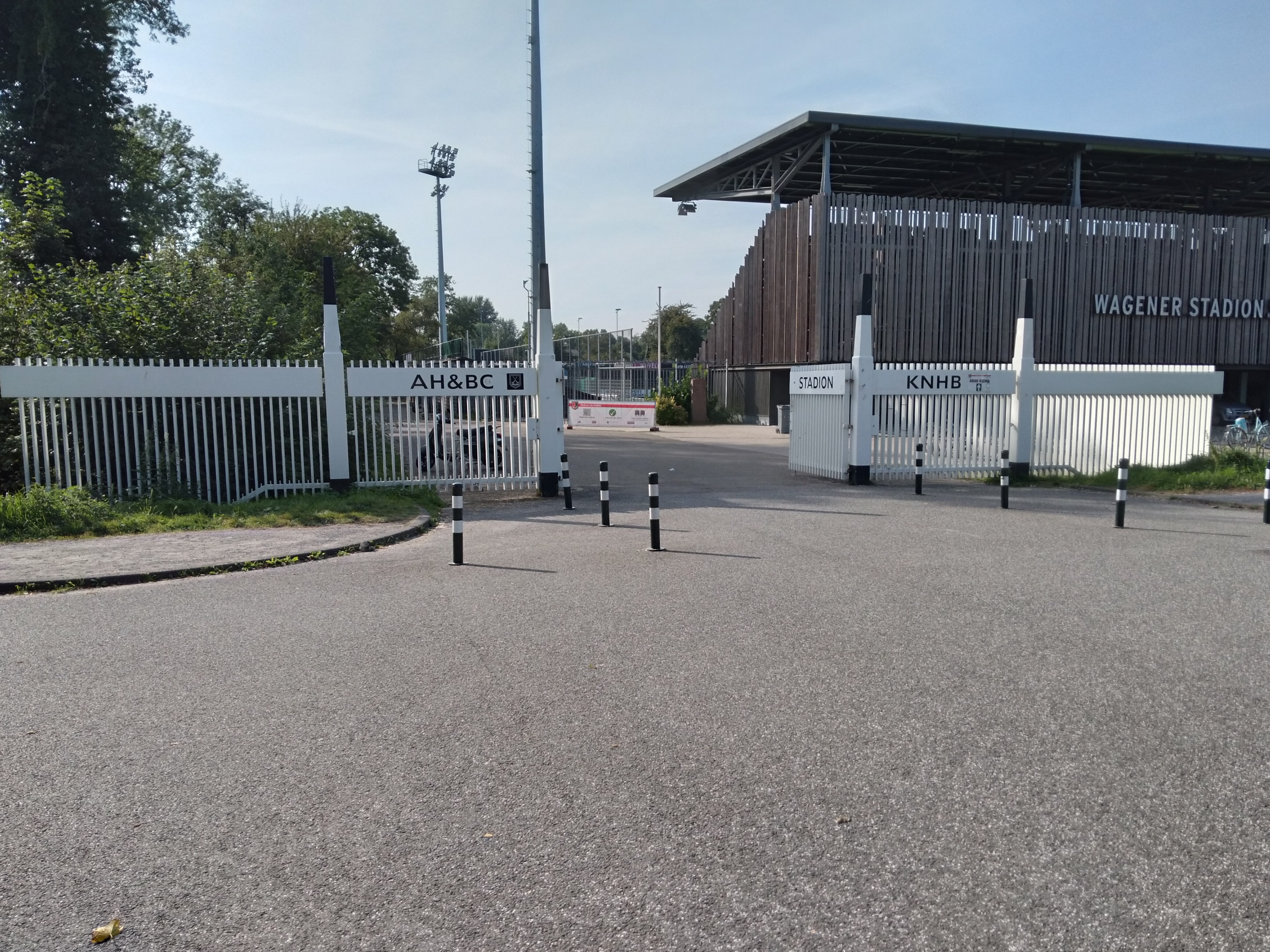
- The Wagener Stadium hosted the final.
- Event: 2026 Women's FIH Hockey World Cup
Netherlands	Argentina
1	1
- Argentina won 3–1 on penalties
- Date: 29 August 2026
- Venue: Wagener Stadium, Amstelveen
- Referee: (New Zealand) Amber Church (Scotland) Sarah Wilson

The 2026 Women's FIH Hockey World Cup final was the final match of the 2026 Women's FIH Hockey World Cup, the 16th edition of the quadrennial world championship for women's national field hockey teams organized by the International Hockey Federation. The match was played at Wagener Stadium in Amstelveen, Netherlands, on 29 Augudt 2026, and was contested by co-hosts Netherlands and Argentina.

The tournament involved co-hosts Belgium and Netherlands alongside 14 other teams. The 16 teams competed in a group stage, from which 8 teams qualified for the second round and 4 later advanced to the semifinals.

For the Netherlands, it was their fourteenth final, while it was the sixth final for Argentina. This was the fifth time the two teams met in a World Cup final after 1974, 2002, 2010, and 2022. Both teams have won two finals against each other. This was a rematch of the 2022 final where the Dutch won 3–1.

Argentina won their third title after beating the Netherlands 3–1 on penalties after a 1–1 draw in Amstelveen.

== Background ==
The 2026 Women's FIH Hockey World Cup was the 16th edition of the Women's FIH Hockey World Cup, the quadrennial world championship for women's national field hockey teams organized by the International Hockey Federation. It is being held from 15 to 30 August 2026 in Wavre, Belgium and Amstelveen, Netherlands.

Belgium and Netherlands were given the hosting rights in November 2022, beating bids from Australia, South Africa and Uruguay in the process. This is the second time the women's event is co-hosted after 2022. This also marks Belgium's first and Netherlands' fifth time hosting. This is also the first time the men's and women's world cup are held as one joint tournament.

16 teams are participating for the third time after the expansion in 2018. Qualification was an amalgamation of the FIH Pro League, continental championships and the World Cup Qualifiers. Qualification took place in December 2023 to March 2026 to decide the qualifiers.

Netherlands were the defending champions after defeating the Argentina 3–1 at the 2022 final in Terrassa.

== Route to the final ==
Note: In all results below, the score of the finalist is given first.

Netherlands
Round
Argentina
Opponent
Result
First round
Opponent
Result
Chile
2–0
Match 1
United States
1–1
Australia
4–2
Match 2
Germany
3–2
Japan
9–0
Match 3
Scotland
2–0
Pool A placement

Pos	Team	Pld	Pts
1	Netherlands (H)	3	9
2	Australia	3	4
3	Japan	3	3
4	Chile	3	1

Source: FIH
(H) Hosts
Final standings
Pool B placement

Pos	Team	Pld	Pts
1	Argentina	3	7
2	Germany	3	6
3	United States	3	4
4	Scotland	3	0

Source: FIH
Opponent
Result
Second round
Opponent
Result
India
2–0
Match 4
Spain
3–0
China
4–1
Match 5
Belgium
0–0
Pool E placement

Pos	Team	Pld	Pts
1	Netherlands (H)	3	9
2	Australia	3	2
3	India	3	2
4	China	3	2

Source: FIH
(H) Hosts
Final standings
Pool F placement

Pos	Team	Pld	Pts
1	Argentina	3	7
2	Belgium (H)	3	5
3	Germany	3	3
4	Spain	3	1

Source: FIH
(H) Hosts
Opponent
Result
Knockout stage
Opponent
Result
Belgium
1–0
Semifinals
Australia
1–0

== Venue ==
The Wagener Stadium hosted the final. This will be the second time they host the final, the first being in 1986.

2026 Women's FIH Hockey World Cup final is located in Netherlands	Amstelveen
2026 Women's FIH Hockey World Cup final is located in Netherlands	Wagener Stadium
2026 Women's FIH Hockey World Cup final is located in Netherlands	Capacity: 10,000

== Match ==
=== Details ===
29 August 2026
16:00

Netherlands	1–1	Argentina
Y. Jansen 30'	Report 1 Report 2	M. Granatto 54'
Penalties
Sanders (penalty shoot-out missed); Albers (penalty shoot-out missed); Veen (penalty shoot-out scored); Moes (penalty shoot-out missed)	1–3	(penalty shoot-out scored) V. Granatto; (penalty shoot-out scored) Bruggesser; (penalty shoot-out missed) Díaz; (penalty shoot-out scored) Cairo

Wagener Stadium, Amstelveen
Attendance: 10,101
Umpires:
Amber Church (NZL)
Sarah Wilson (SCO)

Netherlands	Argentina

GK	1	Anne Veenendaal
DF	5	Lisa Post
DF	14	Sanne Koolen
DF	9	Renée van Laarhoven (c)
MF	11	Pien Sanders
MF	7	Xan de Waard
MF	8	Yibbi Jansen
MF	10	Felice Albers
FW	21	Pien Dicke
FW	19	Marijn Veen
FW	16	Joosje Burg
Substitutions:
DF	3	Rosa Fernig	Substituted on
MF	12	Luna Fokke	Substituted on
FW	18	Freeke Moes	Substituted on
MF	17	Marleen Jochems	Substituted on
FW	37	Guusje Moes	Substituted on
Manager:
(Australia) Raoul Ehren

GK	13	Cristina Cosentino
DF	2	Sofía Toccalino
DF	3	Agustina Gorzelany
DF	25	Juana Castellaro
DF	4	Valentina Raposo
MF	5	Agostina Alonso
MF	17	Sofía Cairo
MF	10	María Granatto (c)	27'
MF	22	Eugenia Trinchinetti
FW	28	Julieta Jankunas
FW	33	Zoe Díaz
Substitutions:
FW	23	Lara Casas		(substituted on) 20'
DF	29	Victoria Miranda		(substituted on) 20'
FW	60	Brisa Bruggesser		(substituted on) 20'
Manager:
(Argentina) Fernando Ferrara

Technical official:
(Australia) Tammy Standley
Scoring judge:
(Belgium) Benoit Coppieters
Timing judge:
(Australia) Josh Burt
Video umpire:
(Australia) Zeke Newman
Reserve umpire:
(Germany) Ben Goentgen

Match rules

- Four quarters of 15 minutes (60 minutes in total)
- Penalty shoot-out if scores still level.

=== Statistics ===
Netherlands
Num	Pos	Player	Goals	FGS	PCS	PSS
1	GK	Anne Veenendaal	0	0	0	0
5	DF	Lisa Post	0	0	0	0
9	DF	Renée van Laarhoven (C)	0	0	0	0
14	DF	Sanne Koolen	0	0	0	0
7	DM	Xan de Waard	0	0	0	0
8	DM	Yibbi Jansen	1	0	1	0
11	AM	Pien Sanders	0	0	0	0
10	FW	Felice Albers	0	0	0	0
16	FW	Joosje Burg	0	0	0	0
19	FW	Marijn Veen	0	0	0	0
21	FW	Pien Dicke	0	0	0	0
Substitutions
22	GK	Josine Koning	0	0	0	0
3	DF	Rosa Fernig	0	0	0	0
17	DM	Marleen Jochems	0	0	0	0
12	AM	Luna Fokke	0	0	0	0
15	FW	Frédérique Matla	0	0	0	0
18	FW	Freeke Moes	0	0	0	0
37	FW	Guusje Moes	0	0	0	0
Head coach
Raoul Ehren

Netherlands	Statistics	Argentina
3	PCE	8
33%	PC EFF	12.5%
0	PSE	0
0%	PS EFF	0%

Cards
Team	Q1	Q2	Q3	Q4
Netherlands	0	0	0	0
Argentina	0	1	0	0

Reviews
Team	Q1	Q2	Q3	Q4	PS
Netherlands	0	0	0	0	0
Argentina	0	0	0	0	0
Umpire	0	0	0	0	1 (Note: There was an umpire review for Argentina's third penalty by Zoe Díaz, which would end up being ruled out due to a backstick violation.)

Penalty corners
Netherlands	Argentina
1 (29:08)	1 (32:43)
2 (30:29)	2 (32:49)
3 (49:49)	3 (34:15)
	4 (43:26)
	5 (43:38)
	6 (51:06)
	7 (51:12)
	8 (53:48)

Argentina
Num	Pos	Player	Goals	FGS	PCS	PSS
13	GK	Cristina Cosentino	0	0	0	0
2	DF	Sofía Toccalino	0	0	0	0
3	DF	Agustina Gorzelany	0	0	0	0
4	DF	Valentina Raposo	0	0	0	0
25	DF	Juana Castellaro	0	0	0	0
5	MF	Agostina Alonso	0	0	0	0
20	MF	Sofía Cairó	0	0	0	0
22	MF	Eugenia Trinchinetti	0	0	0	0
10	FW	María Granatto 27' (C)	1	0	1	0
28	FW	Julieta Jankunas	0	0	0	0
33	FW	Zoe Díaz	0	0	0	0
Substitutions
40	GK	Mercedes Artola	0	0	0	0
43	DF	Emma Knobl	0	0	0	0
18	MF	Victoria Sauze	0	0	0	0
29	MF	Victoria Miranda	0	0	0	0
21	FW	Victoria Granatto	0	0	0	0
23	FW	Lara Casas	0	0	0	0
60	FW	Brisa Bruggesser	0	0	0	0
Head coach
Fernando Ferrara
