= 2025 Women's FIH Hockey Junior World Cup squads =

Women's Hockey Junior World Cup tournament

This article lists the confirmed squads for the 2025 FIH Junior World Cup tournament to be held in Santiago, Chile from 1 to 13 December 2025.

== Pool A ==
=== Chile ===
Head coach: Alejandro Gómez

18. Laura Müller (C)
23. Josefina Carrasco
30. Gala Hernández
33. Dominga Pérez
35. Consuelo Espinosa
38. Sofía Messen
45. Victoria Arrieta
46. Catalina Rojas
47. Javiera Sáenz
48. Laura Salamanca
50. Jacinta Solari
51. Isidora Caravia
57. Montserrat Araya (GK)
58. Florencia Barrios (C)
59. Trinidad Barrios
60. Josefa Lüders
66. Maite Parada
91. Josefina Gutiérrez

=== Japan ===
The squad was announced on 30 October 2025.

Head coach: Akira Takahashi

1. Mizuki Morita (GK)
2. Akari Sawada (GK)
3. Minami Otsuka (C)
4. Hanami Saito
5. Sena Tabuchi
6. Sana Hayasuke
7. Ai Hiramitsu
8. Mizuki Fujiwara
9. Niko Maruyama
10. Non Yakabe
11. Kazuha Kageyama
14. Rei Yoshida
15. Ayano Usui
17. Kokona Tanaka
18. Rina Yamamoto
19. Yuina Taya
21. Renka Tetsuka
22. Sayo Koike

=== Malaysia ===
Head coach: Lailin Hassan

1. Nur Mohd (GK)
2. Zati Muhamad
3. Nurathirah Syamsul
4. Siti Mohd
6. Zawiatul Hartomo
7. Azmyra Azhairy
8. Irma Arief
9. Nurhanie Tarmizi
12. Nur Mazlan
13. Nur Mohd
14. Nur Ridzuan
15. Nur Che
16. Sazanianie Sabinus (GK)
17. Nur Zulkifli
18. Nur Mohammed (C)
22. Nor Tamjit
30. Nur Azwan
31. Nurdini Ridzuan

=== Netherlands ===
The squad was announced on 29 October 2025.

Head coach: Kai de Jager

1. Phileine Hazen (GK)
3. Guusje Moes
5. Kaatje Walhof
6. Brechtje van Santbrink
7. Noor van den Nieuwenhof (C)
8. Sam Luttmer
9. Trijntje Beljaars
10. Eline Jansen
11. Imke Verstraeten
13. Iza Osborne (GK)
14. Noa Muller
16. Lieve Wijckmans
17. Fleur Wolfert
18. Iris de Kemp
19. Mea de Vries
20. Maud van den Heuvel
21. Ivy Tellier
22. Veere ter Horst

== Pool B ==
=== Argentina ===
The squad was announced on 5 November 2025.

Head coach: Juan Martín López

1. Lucía Ladron (GK)
2. Juana Castellaro (C)
3. Chiara Ambrosini
5. Victoria Falasco
8. Milagros di Santo
10. Lara Casas
11. Lourdes Pisthón
15. Sol Olalla
18. Catalina Stamati
19. Sol Guignet
22. Carmen Pucheta
23. Pilar Pisthón
29. Emma Knobl
30. Delfina Persoglia
32. Mercedes Artola (GK)
33. Zoe Díaz
37. Maxima Duportal
64. Milagros Alastra

=== Belgium ===
The squad was announced on 20 October 2025.

Head coach: (Australia) Tim White

5. Chloé Delhalle
6. Loes Palfliet
9. Marthe-Marie Geerts
10. Fee van den Abeele
11. Perrine de Clerck
12. Emilie Verhees
18. Felice Theunissen
19. Emma Plets
20. Alexi van Remortel
22. Marie Gelders (GK)
23. Maura Cornelissens
25. Agathe Favart
28. Lisa Moors
30. Louise van Hecke
32. Louise Dewaet
33. Maïté Bussels (GK)
40. Camille Belis
77. Famke van Heel

=== Wales ===
The squad was announced on 20 October 2025.

Head coach: Walid Abdo

4. Caitlin Witham
14. Amy Partridge (GK)
32. Holly Done
36. Isabella Lowton
40. Amy Cradden
51. Amber Millard-Smith
55. Elenya Beard
59. Matilda Edwards
63. Stephanie Smith
68. Nancy Whittlestone
71. Betsan Thomas (C)
72. Amy Hughes (GK)
74. Makenzy Beard
78. Olivia Forey
82. Eloise Moat
86. Poppy Done
96. Freya Diamond
98. Seren Bean

=== Zimbabwe ===
The squad was announced on 6 October 2025.

Head coach: Bradley Heuer

1. Ayanda Mangenah (GK)
2. Natalie Chimanda (GK)
3. Asante Ali
4. Rebeca Winsor
5. Mufarowashe Matambo
7. Hannah Godfrey
8. Nyasha Bvute
9. Ella Allardice
10. Amber Tozana
11. Panaka Kambadza
12. Tanyaradzwa Changa
13. Tinodiwanashe Elijah (C)
14. Mutsawashe Musiyiwa
15. Khanyisile Mzizi
16. Chelsey-Lee Hares
17. Ruvarashe Mushavi
18. Jodie Anderson
21. Nakai Mujaranji

== Pool C ==
=== Germany ===
The squad was announced on 4 November 2025.

Head coach: Jakob Cyrus

1. Franziska Hagen (GK)
3. Victoria Käske
5. Lena Frerichs
6. Friederike Heusgen
7. Gesa Lubienski
9. Annika Schönhoff
10. Carolin Seidel
11. Taja Gans (C)
15. Katharina Becker
17. Lynn Krings
19. Emilia Landshut
20. Julia Schedl (C)
22. Romy Riede
23. Mia Montag
24. Sophia Wegener (GK)
25. Johanna Hachenberg
26. Katharina Haid (C)
33. Martina Reisenegger

=== India ===
The squad was announced on 10 November 2025.

Head coach: Tushar Khandker

2. Jyoti Singh (C)
11. Khaidem Shileima Chanu
12. Binima Dhan
13. Kanika Siwach
15. Ishika
21. Hina Bano
22. Sukhveer Kaur
24. Nandni
25. Engil Harsharani Minz (GK)
26. Sakshi Shukla
27. Lalthantluangi
29. Sunelita Toppo
32. Puja Sahoo
39. Sakshi Rana
54. Sonam
55. Manisha
65. Purnima Yadav
88. Nidhi (GK)

=== Ireland ===
The squad was announced on 4 November 2025.

Head coach: Graeme Francey

1. Charlie Bowman (GK)
2. Lucy McGoldrick (GK)
3. Alex Byrne
4. Sarah Byrne
5. Each Curran
6. Matilde Errico
7. Milla Fulton
8. Eva Gaston
9. Caitlin Gribbin
10. Amy Handcock (C)
11. Katie Herron
12. Amelia Jerman
13. Mollie Lennon
14. Rebekah Lennon
15. Maia McCort
16. Robyn Murphy
17. Hollai Quinn
18. Róisín Sexton

=== Namibia ===
The squad was announced on 22 October 2025.

Head coach: Sedtric Makati

1. Jasmine Cartwright (GK)
2. Marlene Coetzee
3. Azaylee Philander (C)
4. Erin Moffet
5. Anine le Roux
6. Abigail Rowles
7. Marika Neethling
8. Jessica Gresse
9. Nicola Fourie
10. Kyla Gille
11. Alice Rowles
12. Anthea Coetzee
13. Milah Malan
14. Maryke Kruger
15. Annica Higgs
16. Danica Retief
17. Mia Karsten
18. Anri Jacobs (GK)

== Pool D ==
=== Austria ===
Head coach: Christian Hoffmann

2. Josefine Riedl
8. Louisa Pelz
9. Elena Lendl (GK)
11. Katharina Bauer (C)
12. Amelie Minar
14. Philippa Proksch
15. Katharina Proksch (C)
16. Anna Damm
17. Florentina Buchta
22. Victoria Püsche
23. Lisa Sailer
26. Liv Heindl
27. Julia Enzinger
28. Anja Haselsteiner
29. Celina Kölbl
30. Marie Pelz
32. Anna Hackl
42. Sofie Draxler (GK)

=== China ===
Head coach: Huang Yongsheng

48. Zhang Mengyao (GK)
56. Hao Guoting
57. Li Jingyi
63. Wang Lihang
64. Luo Yaxi
65. Wang Xue
66. Feng Qingmiao
67. Wu Zhangting
68. Tan Lei
69. Sun Chang
70. Wei Qingqing
71. Ming Siyu
72. Zuo Dandan
73. Cen Hailin (GK)
75. Hu Linyuan
76. Zou Lizhe
77. Nie Yushuo
78. Wei Qixiao

=== England ===
The squad was announced on 24 October 2025.

Head coach: Simon Letchford

5. Freya Robinson
6. Sienna Dunn
7. Mia Moore
8. Molly Smith (GK)
9. Sofia Martin
10. Evie Grindal
11. Minnie Pollock
13. Matilda Crampsie
14. Matilda Woodhead (GK)
15. Biba Mills
16. Charlotte Bingham
17. Hollie Dring-Richardson
19. Olivia Breed
21. Isabella Yonge
22. Josefina Hippe
23. Bethany Gardens
28. Jessica Dyson
35. Hannah Boss

=== South Africa ===
The squad was announced on 1 October 2025.

Head coach: Cindy Brown

4. Germarie Spershott
5. Tara Pakendorf
6. Leah du Plessis
7. Taheera Augousti
8. Emily Macquet
9. Anja Tromp
10. Ané Janse van Vuuren
11. Thabelani Metu
13. Paris-Gail Isaacs
14. Baylee Engelke
15. Malikah Hamza
16. Nomsa Mzizi
17. Ntsopa Mokoena
18. Teshawn de la Rey
19. Hannah Quinton
24. Reabetswe Phume
25. Richele Norval (GK)
26. Manisha Desai (GK)

== Pool E ==
=== Australia ===
The squad was announced on 27 October 2025.

Head coach: Tim Strapp

2. Mihaylia Howell
3. Maddison Brooks (C)
4. Karissa van der Wath
6. Madeline Kenny
7. Makayla Jones
8. Samantha Love
10. Josie Lawton (C)
11. Camryn Mathison
12. Taylor Brooks
14. Caitlyn Templeman
15. Jamie-Lee Surha
17. Georgia Hiskins
20. Georgie Smithers
21. Georgina West
22. Evie Stansby
23. Bianca Zurrer
26. Summer Greenway (GK)
27. Alyssa Smith (GK)

=== Canada ===
The squad was announced on 8 October 2025.

Head coach: Kyle Marks

2. Nicole Poulakis
4. Katherine Gibb (C)
5. Prabnoor Hundal
7. Shannon Stelling
9. Madison Hunter
10. Kenzie Girgis
12. Wynn Brown
13. Rebecca Stone
15. Calista Schwartz
18. Stella Malinowski
21. Rylie Novak
22. Stella Goddard-Despot
24. Madeline Skeans
25. Pascale Pottier (GK)
26. Mary Yang (GK)
27. Megan Schienbein
28. Zoe Furber
29. Sydney Le

=== Scotland ===
The squad was announced on 27 October 2025.

2. Emily Morris
3. Caterina Nelli
4. Darcy Littlefield
5. Lucy Harris (GK)
6. Lexie MacMillan
7. Ava Wadsworth
8. Mhairi Low
9. Kirsten Murison
10. Amber Wade
11. Jessica Garden
12. Katie Brett
14. Riley Thomson
15. Amy Grassom
16. Marianna Maclean
18. Jennifer Cain
19. Cara Falconer
32. Connie Roxburgh (C)
37. Jess Mitchell (GK)

=== Spain ===
The squad was announced on 3 November 2025.

Head coach: Alejandro Iglesias

1. Carlota Álvarez (GK)
5. Carlota González
6. Leire Zubizarreta
8. Lena Alonso
9. Sara Carmona
10. Teresa Sáenz de Santa María (C)
13. Esther Canales
14. Anna Gardsjord
15. Marta Armenteras
16. Ivet Martí
17. Natalia Vilanova
18. Gabriela Pérez
19. Sofía Keenan
21. Marta Alcaraz
22. Lidia Paniagua (GK)
25. Victoria Madariaga
27. Alejandra de la Llama
29. Mireia Gifra

== Pool F ==
=== New Zealand ===
The squad was announced on 29 September 2025.

Head coach: Verity Sharland

2. Emma Findlay
3. Georgie Shotter
4. Nina Murphy
5. Riana Pho (C)
6. Katie Bond
7. Greer Findlay
8. Emelia Surridge
9. Charlie Wills
10. Hannah Findlay
11. Emma Irwin
17. Cara Morrison
18. Ella Leighton
19. Kaea Elliott
20. Niamh McKenzie
21. Holly Hilton-Jones
23. Jayda Pawhau (GK)
24. Kate Fraser (GK)
25. Hannah Donald

=== South Korea ===
Head coach: Kim Seong-eun

1. Ryu Si-woo
4. Hong Solbeotnara
9. Cho Eun-been (C)
10. Lee Soo-hyun
11. Son Na-yeong
12. Lee Sug-yeong
14. Park Seo-yeon (C)
15. Hong Yong-eun
16. Park So-yeon
17. Lee Ji-hae
18. Jeong Ran-kyong
19. Jang Hye-ji
21. Han Nar-yeong
22. Park Mi-gyeong
24. Sin Hyon-ji
30. Kim Da-hae (GK)
32. Park Hyeon-jeong
33. Joo So-yeon

=== United States ===
The squad was announced on 16 October 2025.

Head coach: Ange Bradley

1. Mia Myklebust
2. Mary Adams
3. Maci Bradford
5. Olivia Bent-Cole
6. Ella Beach
7. Reese D'Ariano
8. Sofia Ferri
9. Lauren Masters
10. Ava Moore
11. Reese Anetsberger
13. Madison Beach
15. Alaina McVeigh
16. Mia Abello (C)
17. Mia Schoenbeck
18. Daniela Mendez-Trendler
19. Josie Hollamon
97. Alyssa Klebasko (GK)
98. Juliana Boon (GK)

=== Uruguay ===
Head coach: Rolando Rivero

1. Chiara Curcio (C)
2. Agustina Mari
3. Jacinta Curutchague (C)
4. Carolina Curcio
5. Camila Minatta
6. Silvina Bonaudi
7. Valentina Luis
8. Sol Martínez
9. Agustina Guerrero
10. María Rodríguez
11. Clara Borthagaray
12. Guillermina Carassale
13. Francisca Guani (GK)
14. Justina Arregui
15. Sofía Trigo
16. Sol Myszka (C)
17. Melina Haidukowski
18. María Topolansky (GK)
