= Field hockey at the 2026 South American Games =

- Venue: Estadio Asociacion Santafesina de Hockey
- Location: Santa Fe, Argentina
- Dates: 13 – 22 September
- Nations: 6

Champions
- Men: Argentina
- Women: Argentina

The men's and the women's field hockey competitions at the 2026 South American Games were the fifth edition of hockey at the South American Games. Both tournaments were held in conjunction with one another between 13 – 22 September 2026 at Estadio Asociacion Santafesina de Hockey in Santa Fe, Argentina.

The top two teams in each tournament qualified for the 2027 Pan American Games in Lima, Peru.

== Participating nations ==
=== Men's tournament ===
- Argentina
- Brazil
- Chile
- Peru
- Uruguay

=== Women's tournament ===
- Argentina
- Chile
- Paraguay
- Peru
- Uruguay

== Venue ==
(Argentina) Santa Fe
Estadio Asociación Santafesina de Hockey
Capacity: 450

== Medal summary ==
=== Medal table ===
* Host nation (Argentina)

Rank	Nation	Gold	Silver	Bronze	Total
1	Argentina (ARG)*	2	0	0	2
2	Chile (CHI)	0	2	0	2
3	Uruguay (URU)	0	0	2	2
Totals (3 entries)		2	2	2	6

=== Medalists ===
Event	Gold	Silver	Bronze
Men's tournament	Argentina; Yaco Kovalivker; Luca Dulor; Matteo Fernández; Joaquín Costa; Mateo Serrano; Tomás Ruiz; Santiago Tarazona; Mateo Torrigiani; Juan Fernández; Joaquín Ruiz; Nicolás Cicileo; Thomas Habif; Nicolás Rodríguez; Martin Ferreiro; Franco Agostini; Iñaki Minadeo	Chile; Agustín Araya; Alexei de Witt; José Maldonado; Raimundo Valenzuela; Kay Gesswein; Juan Amoroso; José Hurtado; Ignacio Contardo; Axel Stein; Sebastián Wolansky; Arnau Labbe; Agustín Valenzuela; Nils Strabucchi; Bruno Acevedo; Sebastián Loehnert; Gaspar Carvajal	Uruguay; Francisco García Genta; Ignacio Machado; Federico Galindo; Lucas Cantaro; Gonzalo Martinoni; Tomás López; Joaquín Rodríguez; Marcello Diconca; Juan Casal; May Moria; Matías Pereiro; Jenaro Bentancur; Ezequiel Bauza; Diego Laborde; Mateo Pereiro; Rodrigo Castro
Women's tournament	Argentina; Sofía Cairó; Lara Casas; Sol Pagella; Daiana Pacheco; Zoe Díaz; Pilar Palacio; Chiara Ambrosini; Mercedes Artola; Victoria Falasco; Emma Knobl; Catalina Andrade; Lourdes Pisthón; Sol Guignet; Pilar Pisthón; Brisa Bruggesser; Milagros Alastra	Chile; Fernanda Villagrán; Doménica Ananías; María Maldonado; Fernanda Arrieta; Manuela Urroz; Constanza Palma; Francisca Irazoqui; Laura Müller; Antonia Irazoqui; Paula Valdivia; Florencia Barrios; Monserrat Obon; Natalia Salvador; Constanza Muñoz; Victoria Arrieta; Josefina Gutiérrez	Uruguay; Florencia Peñalba; Manuela Vilar; Pilar Oliveros; Martina Rago; Manuela Quiñones; Magdalena Gómez; Guadalupe Curutchague; Clementina Cristiani; Agustina Díaz; María Barreiro; Jacinta Curutchague; Valentina Luis; Milagros Seigal; María Rodríguez; María Bate; Lola Delafond

== Men's tournament ==
Tournament details
- Host country: Argentina
- City: Santa Fe
- Dates: 13–22 September
- Teams: 5 (from 1 confederation)
- Venue: Estadio Asociacion Santafesina de Hockey

Final positions
- Champions: Argentina (5th title)
- Runner-up: Chile
- Third place: Uruguay

Tournament statistics
- Matches played: 12
- Goals scored: 77 (6.42 per match)
- Top scorer: (Argentina) Franco Agostini (9 goals)

=== Squads ===
Argentina

Head coach: Juan Vivaldi, Lucas Rey

3. Yaco Kovalivker
4. Luca Dulor
6. Matteo Fernandez
9. Joaquin Costa
11. Mateo Serrano
15. Tomás Ruiz
17. Santiago Tarazona
18. Mateo Torrigiani
24. Juan Fernandez
25. S. Joaquin Ruiz (GK)
26. Nicolas Cicileo
29. Thomas Habif (C)
30. Nicholas Rodriguez
32. Martin Ferreiro
39. Franco Agostini
41. Iñaki Minadeo
Brazil

Head coach: Javier Telechea

2. Bruno Mendonça
3. Rodrigo Steimbach
4. Matheus de Oliveira
6. Adam Imer
7. André Patrocínio
8. Yuri van der Heijden
9. Stephane Smith
10. Joaquin Lopez
11. Gabriel Martins
12. Arthur Giro (C)
15. Patrick van der Heijden
18. Gustavo Felinto
19. Vinicius Vaz
23. Gabriel Moreira
31. Rodrigo Faustino (GK)
77. Luiz Martins
Chile

Head coach: Emiliano Monteleone

1. Agustin Araya (GK)
8. Alexei de Witt
9. José Maldonado
10. Raimundo Valenzuela
11. Kay Gesswein
14. Juan Amoroso
15. Jose Hurtado
18. Ignacio Contardo
19. Axel Stein
22. Sebastián Wolansky
23. Arnau Labbe
25. Agustin Valenzuela
28. Nils Strabucchi (C)
35. Bruno Acevedo
41. Sebastian Loehnert
42. Gaspar Carvajal
Peru

Head coach: Diego Santiago Chipana Savero

1. Nicolas Baca (GK)
2. Renzo Huacchillo
3. Angelov Contreras
4. Manuel Tasayco
5. Irvin Cekani
6. Darwin Chavez (C)
7. Gianfranco Curo
8. Ernesto Costa
9. Fernando Aldana
10. Rodrigo Diaz Espinosa
11. Sebastian Dennison
13. Daniel Huanca
15. Camilo Cotrina
16. Matias Caceres
17. Gabriel Pezo
18. Abel Romero (C)
Uruguay

Head coach: Gonzalo Ferrer

2. Francisco García Genta
4. Ignacio Machado
5. Federico Galindo
7. Lucas Cantaro
8. Gonzalo Martinoni
9. Tomas Lopez
10. Joaquin Rodriguez (C)
11. Marcello Diconca
12. Juan Casal
13. May Moria
14. Matias Pereiro
18. Jenaro Bentancur
19. Ezequiel Bauza
22. Diego Laborde (C)
24. Mateo Pereiro
28. Rodrigo Castro (GK)

=== Preliminary round ===
==== Pool ====
Pos	Team	Pld	W	D	L	GF	GA	GD	Pts	Qualification
1	Argentina (H)	4	4	0	0	38	2	+36	12	Gold medal match
2	Chile	4	3	0	1	18	6	+12	9	Gold medal match
3	Brazil	4	2	0	2	9	11	−2	6	Bronze medal match
4	Uruguay	4	1	0	3	4	17	−13	3	Bronze medal match
5	Peru	4	0	0	4	2	35	−33	0	

Source: FIH
Rules for classification: 1) points; 2) matches won; 3) goal difference; 4) goals for; 5) head-to-head result; 6) field goals for.
(H) Hosts

All times are local (UTC–3)

13 September 2026
11:00

Chile	7–0	Peru
R. Valenzuela 5'; Contardo 19'; Amoroso 21'; Hurtado 25'; Acevedo 39'; Wolansky 41'; Gesswein 58'	Report

Umpires:
Fabian Romero (PAR)
Claudio Martinez (URU)

13 September 2026
15:00

Brazil	3–2	Uruguay
Patrocínio 8'; Smith 9'; Lopez 56'	Report	Moria 44'; Pereiro 56'

Umpires:
Juan Pedro Rodriguez (ARG)
Basilio Canale (ARG)

14 September 2026
12:00

Argentina	22–0	Peru
Agostini 4', 12', 15', 36', 45'; Kovalivker 11', 39'; Torrigiani 11', 26', 43', 51'; Tarazona 19', 31', 58'; Dulor 42'; T. Ruiz 44'; Serrano 45'; Costa 46', 47'; Rodríguez 54'; Habif 54'; Ferreiro 57'	Report

Umpires:
Victoria Pazos (PAR)
Guillermo Poblete (CHI)

15 September 2026
12:00

Chile	6–0	Uruguay
Contardo 12', 24'; Strabucchi 33', 44'; Stein 52'; Acevedo 54'	Report

Umpires:
Jonathan Altamirano (MEX)
Juan Pedro Rodriguez (ARG)

16 September 2026
10:00

Brazil	1–4	Argentina
Imer 26'	Report	Agostini 4', 13'; Kovalivker 17'; Fernández 20'

Umpires:
Guillermo Poblete (CHI)
Claudio Martinez (URU)

16 September 2026
14:00

Uruguay	2–1	Peru
Cantaro 12'; Pereiro 22'	Report	Curo 14'

Umpires:
Fabian Romero (PAR)
Basilio Canale (ARG)

18 September 2026
10:00

Peru	1–4	Brazil
Díaz Espinosa 49'	Report	Lopez 45'; Imer 49'; Y. van der Heijden 55'; Martins 60'

Umpires:
Claudio Martinez (URU)
Natalia Lodeiro (URU)

18 September 2026
14:00

Chile	1–5	Argentina
Amoroso 30+'	Report	Agostini 3'; Tarazona 13'; Costa 39'; Rodríguez 43'; Ferreiro 52'

Umpires:
Fabian Romero (PAR)
Victoria Pazos (PAR)

19 September 2026
14:00

Brazil	1–4	Chile
Y. van der Heijden 5'	Report	Wolansky 15'; A. Valenzuela 23'; Contardo 30'; De Witt 55'

Umpires:
Juan Pedro Rodriguez (ARG)
Basilio Canale (ARG)

20 September 2026
12:00

Argentina	7–0	Uruguay
Rodríguez 7'; Serrano 13'; Costa 19', 40'; Torrigiani 46'; Dulor 53'; Cicileo 57'	Report

Umpires:
Guillermo Poblete (CHI)
Jonathan Altamirano (MEX)

=== Bronze medal match ===
22 September 2026
09:00

Brazil	1–1	Uruguay
Patrocínio 40'	Report	Galindo 59'
Penalties
Heijden (penalty shoot-out missed); J. Lopez (penalty shoot-out missed); Patrocínio (penalty shoot-out missed); Imer (penalty shoot-out scored); Smith (penalty shoot-out scored)	2–3	(penalty shoot-out missed) Cantaro; (penalty shoot-out missed) Moria; (penalty shoot-out scored) T. Lopez; (penalty shoot-out scored) Martinoni; (penalty shoot-out scored) Pereiro

Umpires:
Juan Pedro Rodriguez (ARG)
Basilio Canale (ARG)

=== Gold medal match ===
22 September 2026
13:30

Argentina	3–1	Chile
Tarazona 14'; Ferreiro 17'; Agostini 45'	Report	Contardo 52'

Umpires:
Jonathan Altamirano (MEX)
Fabian Romero (PAR)

2026 South American Games
Men's field hockey tournament winners

Argentina
5th title

=== Final standings ===
Pos	Team	Pld	W	D	L	GF	GA	GD	Pts	Qualification
1st place, gold medalist(s)	Argentina (H)	5	5	0	0	41	3	+38	15	2027 Pan American Games
2nd place, silver medalist(s)	Chile	5	3	0	2	19	9	+10	9	2027 Pan American Games
3rd place, bronze medalist(s)	Uruguay	5	1	1	3	5	18	−13	4	
4	Brazil	5	2	1	2	10	12	−2	7	
5	Peru	4	0	0	4	2	35	−33	0	

Source: FIH
(H) Hosts

=== Goalscorers ===
There were 77 goals scored in 12 matches, for an average of 6.42 goals per match.

9 goals

- (Argentina) Franco Agostini

5 goals

- (Argentina) Joaquín Costa
- (Argentina) Santiago Tarazona
- (Argentina) Mateo Torrigiani
- (Chile) Ignacio Contardo

3 goals

- (Argentina) Martín Ferreiro
- (Argentina) Yaco Kovalivker
- (Argentina) Nicolás Rodríguez

2 goals

- (Argentina) Luca Dulor
- (Argentina) Mateo Serrano
- (Brazil) Adam Imer
- (Brazil) Joaquín Lopez
- (Brazil) André Patrocínio
- (Brazil) Yuri van der Heijden
- (Chile) Bruno Acevedo
- (Chile) Juan Amoroso
- (Chile) Nils Strabucchi
- (Chile) Sebastián Wolansky
- (Uruguay) Mateo Pereiro

1 goal

- (Argentina) Nicolás Cicileo
- (Argentina) Juan Fernández
- (Argentina) Thomas Habif
- (Argentina) Tomás Ruiz
- (Brazil) Gabriel Martins
- (Brazil) André Patrocínio
- (Brazil) Stephane Smith
- (Chile) Alexei de Witt
- (Chile) Kay Gesswein
- (Chile) José Hurtado
- (Chile) Axel Stein
- (Chile) Agustín Valenzuela
- (Chile) Raimundo Valenzuela
- (Peru) Gianfranco Curo
- (Peru) Rodrigo Díaz Espinosa
- (Uruguay) Lucas Cantaro
- (Uruguay) Federico Galindo
- (Uruguay) May Moria

Source: FIH

== Women's tournament ==
Tournament details
- Host country: Argentina
- City: Santa Fe
- Dates: 13–22 September
- Teams: 5 (from 1 confederation)
- Venue: Estadio Asociacion Santafesina de Hockey

Final positions
- Champions: Argentina (4th title)
- Runner-up: Chile
- Third place: Uruguay

Tournament statistics
- Matches played: 12
- Goals scored: 118 (9.83 per match)
- Top scorer(s): (Chile) Manuela Urroz (Uruguay) Manuela Vilar (9 goals)

=== Squads ===
Argentina

Head coach: Juan Manuel López

20. Sofía Cairó
23. Lara Casas
26. Sol Pagella
28. Daiana Pacheco
33. Zoe Díaz
36. Pilar Palacio
38. Chiara Ambrosini
40. Mercedes Artola (GK)
42. Victoria Falasco
43. Emma Knobl
45. Catalina Andrade
46. Lourdes Pisthón
49. Sol Guignet
55. Pilar Pisthón
60. Brisa Bruggesser
64. Milagros Alastra
Chile

Head coach: Cristóbal Rodríguez

3. Fernanda Villagrán
4. Doménica Ananías
8. María Maldonado
9. Fernanda Arrieta
10. Manuela Urroz (C)
11. Constanza Palma
12. Francisca Irazoqui
13. Laura Müller
21. Antonia Irazoqui
22. Paula Valdivia
23. Florencia Barrios
26. Monserrat Obon
28. Natalia Salvador (GK)
31. Constanza Muñoz
45. Victoria Arrieta
91. Josefina Gutiérrez
Paraguay

Head coach: Pablo Mendoza

1. Sófia Caballero (GK)
3. Micaela Gómez
5. Victoria Penayo
7. Maria Florentin
8. Ximena Doldán
9. Sara Orquiola
10. Larissa Barreto
11. Bella López
12. Dulce Ayala
20. Astrid Duarte
22. Amira Portillo
23. Elaine Rodríguez (GK)
25. Ximena Llano
28. Arumi González
38. Lilian Acuna
42. Bianca Lagraña
Peru

Head coach: Diego Santiago Chipana Savero

1. Xiomara Bellina (GK)
2. Cynthia Gonzales
3. Solange Alonso
4. Antonia Martínez
5. Mariana Caceres
6. Raisa Correa
7. Macarena Larrañaga
8. Jasmin Werner
9. Daniela Ramírez (C)
10. Danitza Villena
11. Camila Méndez (C)
13. Maria Jiménez
14. Sofía Vicente
15. Marina Montes
16. Renata Sangio
17. Adriana Chiringos
Uruguay

Head coach: Rolando Rivero

2. Florencia Peñalba
3. Manuela Vilar (C)
5. Pilar Oliveros
7. Martina Rago
10. Manuela Quiñones
11. Magdalena Gómez
13. Guadalupe Curutchague
16. Clementina Cristiani
18. Agustina Díaz
19. María Barreiro
23. Jacinta Curutchague
27. Valentina Luis
30. Milagros Seigal
31. María Rodríguez
32. María Bate (GK)
43. Lola Delafond

=== Preliminary round ===
==== Pool ====
Pos	Team	Pld	W	D	L	GF	GA	GD	Pts	Qualification
1	Argentina (H)	4	4	0	0	43	2	+41	12	Gold medal match
2	Chile	4	2	1	1	30	5	+25	7	Gold medal match
3	Uruguay	4	2	1	1	25	5	+20	7	Bronze medal match
4	Paraguay	4	1	0	3	4	44	−40	3	Bronze medal match
5	Peru	4	0	0	4	2	48	−46	0	

Source: FIH
Rules for classification: 1) points; 2) matches won; 3) goal difference; 4) goals for; 5) head-to-head result; 6) field goals for.
(H) Hosts

All times are local (UTC–3)

13 September 2026
09:00

Chile	16–0	Paraguay
Villagrán 6', 60'; F. Arrieta 11', 53', 54'; Maldonado 15', 45'; Urroz 18', 33', 44', 50'; Obon 21'; V. Arrieta 26'; Palma 34'; Gutiérrez 55', 56'	Report

Umpires:
Erika Barbera (USA)
Sofía Alemán (URU)

13 September 2026
13:00

Uruguay	12–0	Peru
Vilar 1', 4', 28', 39', 40'; Cristiani 1'; Rago 15'; Díaz 22', 25', 32'; Quiñones 34', 55'	Report

Umpires:
Macarena Dieni (ARG)
Valentina Grau (CHI)

14 September 2026
10:00

Argentina	14–0	Paraguay
Díaz 4', 22'; Palacio 11', 41'; Casas 14', 21', 53'; Bruggesser 19', 25'; L. Pisthón 27'; Andrade 28', 54'; Alastra 45', 60'	Report

Umpires:
Jonathan Altamirano (MEX)
Natalia Lodeiro (URU)

15 September 2026
10:00

Chile	13–0	Peru
Villagrán 3', 23'; Maldonado 6', 21', 56'; F. Arrieta 8'; A. Irazoqui 15'; Urroz 17', 20', 30', 49'; V. Arrieta 39'; Gutiérrez 41'	Report

Umpires:
Natalia Lodeiro (URU)
Macarena Dieni (ARG)

15 September 2026
14:00

Uruguay	0–5	Argentina
	Report	Andrade 15'; Palacio 29'; Alastra 45', 45'; Díaz 51'

Umpires:
Victoria Pazos (PAR)
Erika Barbera (USA)

16 September 2026
12:00

Peru	1–4	Paraguay
Méndez 57'	Report	Penayo 21', 50'; Doldán 24'; Orquiola 56'

Umpires:
Sofía Alemán (URU)
Valentina Grau (CHI)

18 September 2026
12:00

Chile	1–5	Argentina
Urroz 13'	Report	L. Pisthón 10'; Bruggesser 20'; Casas 40', 43'; Ambrosini 48'

Umpires:
Jonathan Altamirano (MEX)
Erika Barbera (USA)

19 September 2026
10:00

Paraguay	0–13	Uruguay
	Report	Vilar 8'; Luis 9'; Díaz 20', 34'; Cristiani 23'; J. Curutchague 27'; Rago 28'; Seigal 30'; Rodríguez 36', 48', 49', 51'; Barreiro 54'

Umpires:
Valentina Grau (CHI)
Erika Barbera (USA)

20 September 2026
10:00

Uruguay	0–0	Chile
	Report

Umpires:
Macarena Dieni (ARG)
Juan Pedro Rodríguez (ARG)

20 September 2026
14:00

Argentina	19–1	Peru
Pacheco 5', 26'; Díaz 9', 10', 27', 57'; Andrade 12', 35', 48'; Cairó 16'; Alastra 17', 48'; Ambrosini 48', 52'; L. Pisthón 32', 45'; Casas 42'; Pagella 47'; Bruggesser 58'	Report	Montes 59'

Umpires:
Claudio Martínez (URU)
Sofía Alemán (URU)

=== Bronze medal match ===
22 September 2026
11:15

Uruguay	9–0	Paraguay
Vilar 8', 26', 45'; Cristiani 12'; Seigal 22'; J. Curutchague 28'; Quiñones 33', 35'; L. Curutchague 39'	Report

Umpires:
Valentina Grau (CHI)
Aylen Dieni (ARG)

=== Gold medal match ===
22 September 2026
15:45

Argentina	5–0	Chile
Casas 5'; Palacio 27'; Andrade 28'; L. Pisthón 39', 55'	Report

Umpires:
Victoria Pazos (PAR)
Erika Barbera (USA)

2026 South American Games
Women's field hockey tournament winners

Argentina
4th title

=== Final standings ===
Pos	Team	Pld	W	D	L	GF	GA	GD	Pts	Qualification
1st place, gold medalist(s)	Argentina (H)	5	5	0	0	48	2	+46	15	2027 Pan American Games
2nd place, silver medalist(s)	Chile	5	2	1	2	30	10	+20	7	2027 Pan American Games
3rd place, bronze medalist(s)	Uruguay	5	3	1	1	34	5	+29	10	
4	Paraguay	5	1	0	4	4	53	−49	3	
5	Peru	4	0	0	4	2	48	−46	0	

Source: FIH
(H) Hosts

=== Goalscorers ===
There have been 118 goals scored in 12 matches, for an average of 9.83 goals per match.

9 goals

- (Chile) Manuela Urroz
- (Uruguay) Manuela Vilar

7 goals

- (Argentina) Catalina Andrade
- (Argentina) Lara Casas
- (Argentina) Zoe Díaz

6 goals

- (Argentina) Milagros Alastra
- (Argentina) Lourdes Pisthón

5 goals

- (Chile) María Maldonado
- (Uruguay) Agustina Díaz

4 goals

- (Argentina) Brisa Bruggesser
- (Argentina) Pilar Palacio
- (Chile) Fernanda Arrieta
- (Chile) Fernanda Villagrán
- (Uruguay) Manuela Quiñones
- (Uruguay) María Rodríguez

3 goals

- (Argentina) Chiara Ambrosini
- (Chile) Josefina Gutiérrez
- (Uruguay) Clementina Cristiani

2 goals

- (Argentina) Daiana Pacheco
- (Chile) Victoria Arrieta
- (Paraguay) Victoria Penayo
- (Uruguay) Jacinta Curutchague
- (Uruguay) Martina Rago
- (Uruguay) Milagros Seigal

1 goal

- (Argentina) Sofía Cairó
- (Argentina) Sol Pagella
- (Chile) Antonia Irazoqui
- (Chile) Monserrat Obon
- (Chile) Constanza Palma
- (Paraguay) Ximena Doldán
- (Paraguay) Sara Orquiola
- (Peru) Camila Méndez
- (Peru) Marina Montes
- (Uruguay) María Barreiro
- (Uruguay) Lupe Curutchague
- (Uruguay) Valentina Luis

Source: FIH
