= Jacinta Curutchague =

Uruguayan field hockey player

Personal information
- Full name: Jacinta Curutchague Díaz
- Born: 9 May 2005 (age 21) Uruguay

Sport
- Sport: Field hockey
- Position: Midfield
Senior career
Years	Team	Caps	Goals
–	Náutico	-	-
National team
Years	Team	Caps	Goals
2023–2026	Uruguay U–21	29	(2)
2026–	Uruguay	14	(1)
Medal record
Representing Uruguay
Women's field hockey
South American Games
Bronze medal – third place	2026 Santa Fe	Team
Junior Pan American Cup
Bronze medal – third place	2026 Santiago	Team
South American Youth Games
Silver medal – second place	2022 Rosario	Team

Jacinta Curutchague Díaz (born 9 May 2005) is a field hockey player from Uruguay.

== Personal life ==
Her sister, Guadalupe, is also an international field hockey player.

== Career ==
=== Under–21 ===
Curutchague made her debut for the Uruguayan U–21 team in 2023. She was a member of the national squad at the Junior Pan American Cup in Saint Michael, where the team finished fifth.

She competed at her second Junior Pan American Cup in 2024 at the tournament held in Surrey.

In 2025 she was named as captain of the national junior team. Following her appointment, she led the team at the Junior Pan American Games in Asunción and the FIH Junior World Cup in Santiago.

At the 2026 Junior Pan American Cup in Santiago she made her final appearances for the national junior team, winning a bronze medal.

=== Las Cimarronas ===
Curutchague made her senior international debut for Las Cimarronas in 2026 at the FIH World Cup Qualifiers in Hyderabad, earning her first senior cap in a match against India. Her most recent appearances have come at the XIII South American Games in Santa Fe.

== International goals ==
The following is a list of international goals scored by Curutchague.

Goal	Date	Location	Opponent	Score	Result	Competition	Ref.
1	19 September 2026	Asociación Santafesina de Hockey, Santa Fe, Argentina	Paraguay	5–0	13–0	XIII South American Games	
