= 2025 Women's Pan American Cup =

Women's field hockey championship in Montevideo, Uruguay

Tournament details
- Host country: Uruguay
- City: Montevideo
- Dates: 24 July – 3 August
- Teams: 8 (from 1 confederation)
- Venue: Cancha Celeste

Final positions
- Champions: Argentina (7th title)
- Runner-up: United States
- Third place: Uruguay

Tournament statistics
- Matches played: 15
- Goals scored: 74 (4.93 per match)
- Top scorer: (Argentina) Agustina Gorzelany (10 goals)
- Best player: (Uruguay) Manuela Vilar
- Best goalkeeper: (United States) Kelsey Bing

The 2025 Women's Pan American Cup was the seventh edition of the Women's Pan American Cup, the quadrennial international women's field hockey championship of the Americas organised by the Pan American Hockey Federation. The tournament was held alongside the men's tournament in Montevideo, Uruguay from 24 July to 3 August 2025.

Argentina were the defending champions and retained their title with a 3–0 win over the United States in the final. In the bronze medal match, Uruguay made history, defeating Chile 2–0 to win their first ever Pan American Cup medal.

The tournament served as the Pan American qualifier for the 2026 FIH World Cup, with the winner of the tournament earning direct qualification. As Argentina had already qualified via the 2024–25 FIH Pro League, their qualification quota passed to the United States.

== Qualification ==
The tournament included eight teams: the six highest-ranked teams from the 2022 Pan American Cup, the host country if not already qualified, and the winner from the 2024 Pan American Challenge.

Argentina, Canada, Chile, Trinidad and Tobago, the United States and Uruguay qualified from the 2022 Pan American Cup. As the host country Uruguay already qualified via the Pan American Cup its quota was filled by the highest-ranked team in the FIH Women's World Ranking which participated in the 2022 Pan American Cup or the 2024 Pan American Challenge. Finally, Mexico qualified as the winners from the 2024 Pan American Challenge.

Dates	Event	Location	Quotas	Qualifier(s)
19–29 January 2022	2022 Pan American Cup	Santiago, Chile	6	Argentina; Canada; Chile; Trinidad and Tobago; United States; Uruguay
—N/a	Host country	—N/a	1	Uruguay
21–28 September 2024	2024 Pan American Challenge	Hamilton, Bermuda	1	Mexico
—N/a	FIH Women's World Ranking	—N/a	1	Paraguay
Total			8	

== Squads ==
Argentina

Head coach: Fernando Ferrara

2. Sofía Toccalino
3. Agustina Gorzelany
4. Valentina Raposo
5. Agostina Alonso (C)
10. María José Granatto (C)
13. Cristina Cosentino (GK)
18. Victoria Sauze
20. Sofía Cairó
21. Victoria Granatto
22. Eugenia Trinchinetti
25. Juana Castellaro
28. Julieta Jankunas
29. Victoria Miranda
33. Zoe Díaz
38. Chiara Ambrosini
40. Mercedes Artola (GK)
42. Victoria Falasco
43. Emma Knobl
51. Paula Ortiz
60. Brisa Bruggesser
Canada

Head coach: (South Africa) Sheldon Rostron

2. Chloe Walton
3. Thora Rae
4. Julia Ross
5. Brooke McCusker
6. Julia Boraston
7. Anna Mollenhauer
8. Elise Wong (C)
10. Kathleen Leahy
11. Kenzie Girgis
12. Sara Goodman
15. Grace Delmotte
17. Mikayla Stelling
18. Alexis de Armond
19. Audrey Sawers
20. Libby Hogg
21. Nora Goddard-Despot
22. Danielle Husar
26. Nicole Poulakis
31. Rowan Harris (GK)
34. Marcia LaPlante (GK)
Chile

Head coach: Cristóbal Rodríguez

3. Fernanda Villagrán
4. Doménica Ananías
5. Denise Rojas
6. Fernanda Flores
9. Fernanda Arrieta
10. Manuela Urroz (C)
11. Josefa Salas
16. Constanza Palma
18. Laura Müller
19. Agustina Solano
21. Francisca Irazoqui
22. Paula Valdivia
25. María Maldonado
26. Monserrat Obon
28. Natalia Salvador (GK)
29. Simone Avelli
31. Constanza Muñoz
53. Constanza Pérez
57. Montserrat Araya (GK)
91. Josefina Gutiérrez
Mexico

Head coach: San Zuleta

1. Jesús Castillo (GK)
4. Maribel Acosta (C)
6. María Santoyo
7. Dariana Cardiel
8. Mitzi Aguilera
9. Dayana Cuevas
12. Naomi Cardiel
13. Valeria Espinoza
14. Mariana Agraz (GK)
15. Arlette Estrada
16. Fernanda Oviedo
17. Nathalia Nava
18. Alejandra García
19. Grecia Mendoza
20. Sofía Pérez
29. Itzel García
Paraguay

Head coach: Pablo Mendoza

1. Yasmina Samudio (GK)
3. Micaela Gómez
4. Pamela Benítez
5. María Caterba (C)
8. Ximena Doldán
9. Nadia Samudio
10. Larissa Barreto
11. Bella López
13. Sofía Caballero (GK)
15. Cecilia Roura
16. Alejandra González
18. Paula Pistilli
22. Vianca Maciel
24. Abril Sanabria
26. Nicole van Jaarsveld
27. Mia Barreto
42. Bianca Lagraña
71. Agustina Ramos
Trinidad and Tobago

Head coach: Anthony Marcano

1. Arresia Sandy (GK)
2. Jewel Nurse (GK)
3. Daniella Douglas
4. Avion Ashton (C)
5. Natania Rowe
6. Felicia King (C)
10. Brittney Hingh
12. Leah Abraham
13. Giann Sealy
14. Zene Henry
17. Mikeshia de Silva
22. Robyn Dash (C)
24. Renallia Constantine
26. Naomi Holder
27. Jedyah Kistow
28. Zuriel Antoine
30. Kyona Sampson
37. Skye McLean
United States

Head coach: (Republic of Ireland) David Passmore

1. Abigail Tamer
2. Meredith Sholder
3. Ashley Sessa
4. Sophia Gladieux
8. Madeleine Zimmer
10. Reese D'Ariano
11. Katie Dixon
14. Sanne Caarls
16. Emma DeBerdine (C)
17. Elizabeth Yeager
18. Claire Danahy
19. Josie Hollamon
20. Leah Crouse
23. Caroline Ramsey
26. Lucy Adams
27. Ryleigh Heck
31. Kelsey Bing (GK)
32. Jennifer Rizzo (GK)
36. Mia Schoenbeck
39. Jans Croon
Uruguay

Head coach: (Argentina) Rolando Rivero

2. Florencia Peñalba
3. Manuela Vilar (C)
4. Elisa Civetta
5. Pilar Oliveros
6. Camila de María
7. Constanza Barrandeguy (C)
8. Kaisuami Dall'Orso
10. Manuela Quiñones
11. Sol Amadeo
13. Guadalupe Curutchague
15. Agustina Martínez
16. Clementina Cristiani
17. Teresa Viana (C)
18. Agustina Díaz
19. María Barreiro
20. Chiara Curcio
22. Lucía Olascoaga
24. María Montans (GK)
30. Milagros Seigal
32. María Bate (GK)

== Preliminary round ==
All times are local (UTC−3).

=== Pool A ===
Pos	Team	Pld	W	D	L	GF	GA	GD	Pts	Qualification
1	Argentina	3	3	0	0	23	0	+23	9	Semi-finals
2	Uruguay (H)	3	2	0	1	10	3	+7	6	Semi-finals
3	Canada	3	1	0	2	7	6	+1	3	Crossovers
4	Paraguay	3	0	0	3	0	31	−31	0	Crossovers

Source: FIH
Rules for classification: 1) points; 2) matches won; 3) goal difference; 4) goals for; 5) head-to-head result; 6) field goals scored.
(H) Hosts

24 July 2025
11:30

Canada	7–0	Paraguay
Husar 4'; Walton 11'; Stelling 18'; Poulakis 34', 40', 52'; Sawers 45'	Report

Umpires:
Natalia Lodeiro (URU)
Claudia Montino (CHI)

24 July 2025
19:30

Argentina	3–0	Uruguay
Gorzelany 43'; Raposo 49'; Bruggesser 50'	Report

Umpires:
Ayanna McClean (TTO)
Maggie Giddens (USA)

26 July 2025
11:30

Canada	0–4	Argentina
	Report	Gorzelany 7', 13', 60'; Díaz 44'

Umpires:
Allison Mikelson (USA)
Ana Vázquez (MEX)

26 July 2025
19:30

Uruguay	8–0	Paraguay
Quiñones 4', 7'; Oliveros 9'; Dall'Orso 10'; Civetta 14'; Vilar 23', 35'; Díaz 41'	Report

Umpires:
Melina Illanes (ARG)
Rawi Anbananthan (MAS)

28 July 2025
11:30

Argentina	16–0	Paraguay
Gorzelany 5', 14', 27', 28'; Granatto 6', 37'; Ambrosini 23'; Díaz 31', 43', 55'; Raposo 39'; Granatto 41'; Bruggesser 46'; Jankunas 52'; Miranda 52'; Falasco 57'	Report

Umpires:
Natalia Lodeiro (URU)
Ana Vázquez (MEX)

28 July 2025
19:30

Uruguay	2–0	Canada
Viana 7'; Vilar 29'	Report

Umpires:
Victoria Pazos (PAR)
Maggie Giddens (USA)

=== Pool B ===
Pos	Team	Pld	W	D	L	GF	GA	GD	Pts	Qualification
1	United States	3	3	0	0	20	2	+18	9	Semi-finals
2	Chile	3	2	0	1	8	5	+3	6	Semi-finals
3	Mexico	3	1	0	2	5	10	−5	3	Crossovers
4	Trinidad and Tobago (Note: Trinidad & Tobago withdrew due to logistical reasons.)	3	0	0	3	0	15	−15	0	Crossovers

Source: FIH
Rules for classification: 1) points; 2) matches won; 3) goal difference; 4) goals for; 5) head-to-head result; 6) field goals scored.
Notes:

25 July 2025
09:30

Chile	5–0 (Note: The match resulted in a walkover, after the Trinidad & Tobago team arrived late and did not made it in time for the game.)	Trinidad and Tobago
	Report

25 July 2025
17:30

United States	10–0	Mexico
Yeager 1', 3', 24'; Zimmer 8'; Tamer 18', 20'; Heck 20', 44'; Ramsey 35'; Caarls 48'	Report

Umpires:
Victoria Pazos (PAR)
Kim Yoon-seon (KOR)

27 July 2025
09:30

Mexico	5–0	Trinidad and Tobago
	Report

27 July 2025
17:30

Chile	2–5	United States
Arrieta 30'; Rojas 34'	Report	Sholder 2'; Yeager 19'; Ramsey 28'; Tamer 44'; Crouse 54'

Umpires:
Kim Yoon-seon (KOR)
Melina Illanes (ARG)

29 July 2025
09:30

United States	5–0	Trinidad and Tobago
	Report

29 July 2025
17:30

Mexico	0–1	Chile
	Report	Maldonado 43'

Umpires:
Allison Mikelson (USA)
Natalia Lodeiro (URU)

== Classification round ==
=== Bracket ===
Crossover
31 July
Canada	5
Trinidad and Tobago	0
31 July
Paraguay	1
Mexico	4

Fifth place
2 August
Canada	2
Mexico	0
Seventh place
2 August
Trinidad and Tobago	0
Paraguay	5

=== Crossovers ===
31 July 2025
12:00

Canada	5–0	Trinidad and Tobago
	Report

31 July 2025
19:30

Paraguay	1–4	Mexico
Barreto 47'	Report	Cuevas 19', 25'; Acosta 43'; Oviedo 47'

Umpires:
Claudia Montino (CHI)
Melina Illanes (ARG)

=== Seventh and eighth place ===
2 August 2025
19:30

Trinidad and Tobago	0–5	Paraguay
	Report

=== Fifth and sixth place ===
2 August 2025
18:30

Canada	2–0	Mexico
Walton 38'; Goddard-Despot 51'	Report

Umpires:
Claudia Montino (CHI)
Melina Illanes (ARG)

== Medal round ==
=== Bracket ===
Crossover
1 August
Argentina	2
Chile	0
1 August
United States (p.s.o.)	1 (4)
Uruguay	1 (2)

Final
3 August
Argentina	3
United States	0
Third place
3 August
Chile	0
Uruguay	2

=== Semi-finals ===
1 August 2025
12:00

Argentina	2–0	Chile
V. Granatto 7'; Gorzelany 43'	Report

Umpires:
Ayanna McClean (TTO)
Maggie Giddens (USA)

1 August 2025
20:30

United States	1–1	Uruguay
Heck 37'	Report	Amadeo 53'
Penalties
Tamer (penalty shoot-out scored); D'Ariano (penalty shoot-out scored); Heck (penalty shoot-out scored); Gladieux (penalty shoot-out scored)	4–2	(penalty shoot-out scored) Curutchague; (penalty shoot-out scored) Viana; (penalty shoot-out missed) Viana; (penalty shoot-out missed) Civetta

Umpires:
Irene Presenqui (ARG)
Kim Yoon-seon (KOR)

=== Third and fourth place ===
3 August 2025
12:30

Chile	0–2	Uruguay
	Report	Seigal 20'; Viana 48'

Umpires:
Allison Mikelson (USA)
Ana Vázquez (MEX)

=== Final ===
3 August 2025
17:30

Argentina	3–0	United States
Gorzelany 5'; Trinchinetti 31'; Jankunas 60'	Report

Umpires:
Victoria Pazos (PAR)
Kim Yoon-seon (KOR)

== Final standings ==
Pos	Team	Qualification
1	Argentina (Note: Argentina is already qualified for the 2026 FIH World Cup as the highest placed nation of the 2024–25 FIH Pro League.)	
2	United States	2026 FIH World Cup
3	Uruguay (H)	2026 World Cup Qualifiers
4	Chile	2026 World Cup Qualifiers
5	Canada	2026 World Cup Qualifiers
6	Mexico	
7	Paraguay	
WD	Trinidad and Tobago	

Source: FIH
(H) Host

== Goalscorers ==
There were 74 goals scored in 15 matches, for an average of 4.93 goals per match.

10 goals

- (Argentina) Agustina Gorzelany

4 goals

- (Argentina) Zoe Díaz
- (United States) Elizabeth Yeager

3 goals

- (Argentina) Victoria Granatto
- (Canada) Nicole Poulakis
- (United States) Ryleigh Heck
- (United States) Abigail Tamer
- (Uruguay) Manuela Vilar

2 goals

- (Argentina) Brisa Bruggesser
- (Argentina) Julieta Jankunas
- (Argentina) Valentina Raposo
- (Canada) Chloe Walton
- (Mexico) Dayana Cuevas
- (United States) Caroline Ramsey
- (Uruguay) Manuela Quiñones
- (Uruguay) Teresa Viana

1 goal

- (Argentina) Chiara Ambrosini
- (Argentina) Victoria Falasco
- (Argentina) Maria Granatto
- (Argentina) Victoria Miranda
- (Argentina) Eugenia Trinchinetti
- (Canada) Nora Goddard-Despot
- (Canada) Danielle Husar
- (Canada) Audrey Sawers
- (Canada) Mikayla Stelling
- (Chile) Fernanda Arrieta
- (Chile) María Maldonado
- (Chile) Denise Rojas
- (Mexico) Maribel Acosta
- (Mexico) Fernanda Oviedo
- (Paraguay) Larissa Barreto
- (United States) Sanne Caarls
- (United States) Leah Crouse
- (United States) Meredith Sholder
- (United States) Madeleine Zimmer
- (Uruguay) Sol Amadeo
- (Uruguay) Elisa Civetta
- (Uruguay) Kaisuami Dall'Orso
- (Uruguay) Agustina Díaz
- (Uruguay) Pilar Oliveros
- (Uruguay) Milagros Seigal

Source: FIH

== See also ==
- 2025 Men's Pan American Cup
- 2024 Women's Pan American Challenge
