= Field hockey at the 2022 South American Games =

- Venue: Centro Nacional de Hockey
- Location: Luque, Paraguay
- Dates: 3 – 12 October
- Nations: 7

Champions
- Men: Argentina
- Women: Chile

Both the men's and the women's field hockey competitions at the 2022 South American Games were the fourth inclusion of hockey at the South American Games. Both tournaments were held in conjunction with one another between 3 – 12 October 2022 at Centro Nacional de Hockey in Luque, Paraguay.

The top two teams in each tournament will qualify for the 2023 Pan American Games in Santiago, Chile.

== Medal summary ==
=== Medal table ===
* Host nation (Paraguay)

Rank	Nation	Gold	Silver	Bronze	Total
1	Argentina (ARG)	1	1	0	2
1	Chile (CHI)	1	1	0	2
3	Brazil (BRA)	0	0	1	1
3	Uruguay (URU)	0	0	1	1
Totals (4 entries)		2	2	2	6

=== Medalists ===
Event	Gold	Silver	Bronze
Men's tournament	Argentina; Agustín Machelett; Bautista Capurro; Facundo Zárate; Facundo Sarto; Ignacio Ibarra; Juan Catán; Juan Ronconi; Lautaro Ferrero; Lucas Vila; Matías Rey; Nehuen Hernando; Nicolás Acosta; Santiago Tarazona; Tadeo Marcucci; Thomas Habif; Tobías Martins	Chile; Agustín Araya; Agustín Amoroso; Andrés Pizarro; Axel Troncoso; Axel Richter; Diego Ordóñez; Fernando Renz; Ignacio Contardo; José Hurtado; José Maldonado; Juan Amoroso; Kay Gesswein; Martín Rodríguez; Nils Strabucchi; Raimundo Valenzuela; Vicente Goñi	Brazil; Adam Imer; André Patrocínio; Arthur Azevedo; Bruno Mendonça; Daniel Tatara; Eduardo Melo; Fábio Santana; Gabriel Brito; Jean Costa; Joaquín Lopez; Lucas Campos; Lucas Santos; Mateus Silva; Nalbert Figueiredo; Patrick van der Heijden; Yuri van der Heijden
Women's tournament	Chile; Doménica Ananías; Fernanda Arrieta; Camila Caram; Sofía Filipek; Fernanda Flores; Kim Jacob; Josefina Khamis; Mariana Lagos; Francisca Parra; Josefa Salas; Natalia Salvador; Agustina Solano; Francisca Tala; Manuela Urroz; Paula Valdivia; Fernanda Villagrán	Argentina; María Adorno; Catalina Andrade; Clara Barberi; Sofía Cairó; Inés Delpech; Ana Dodorico; María Forcherio; Sol Lombardo; Valentina Marcucci; Gianella Palet; Rocío Sánchez Moccia; Lucía Sanguinetti; Delfina Thome; Sofía Toccalino; Martina Triñanes; Eugenia Trinchinetti	Uruguay; Milagros Algorta; Agustina Alles; Sol Amadeo; Constanza Barrandeguy; María Barreiro; María Bate; Paula Carvalho; Guadalupe Curutchague; Kaisuami Dall'Orso; Jimena García; Magdalena Gómez; Cecilia León; Florencia Peñalba; Teresa Viana; Manuela Vidal; Manuela Vilar

== Men's tournament ==
Tournament details
- Host country: Paraguay
- City: Luque
- Dates: 3–11 October
- Teams: 7 (from 1 confederation)
- Venue: Centro Nacional de Hockey

Final positions
- Champions: Argentina (4th title)
- Runner-up: Chile
- Third place: Brazil

Tournament statistics
- Matches played: 12
- Goals scored: 130 (10.83 per match)
- Top scorer: (Chile) Juan Amoroso (15 goals)

=== Preliminary round ===
==== Pool A ====
Pos	Team	Pld	W	D	L	GF	GA	GD	Pts	Qualification
1	Argentina	2	2	0	0	34	0	+34	6	Semi-finals
2	Peru	2	1	0	1	2	18	−16	3	Semi-finals
3	Uruguay	2	0	0	2	1	19	−18	0	

Source: FIH
Rules for classification: 1) points; 2) matches won; 3) goal difference; 4) goals for; 5) head-to-head result; 6) field goals for.

3 October 2022
11:30

Argentina	17–0	Uruguay
Ibarra 1', 16', 38'; Vila 4', 7', 49'; Catán 8', 20'; Acosta 10'; Martins 14', 24'; Ferrero 26', 34', 37'; Capurro 28'; Tarazona 29'; Rey 35'	Report

Umpires:
Reinier Díaz (CUB)
Hugo Romero (PAR)

5 October 2022
09:30

Peru	0–17	Argentina
	Report	Vila 3', 13', 58'; Martins 7', 48', 59'; Sarto 15'; Ronconi 18', 52'; Ibarra 21'; Acosta 23'; Tarazona 24'; Ferrero 26', 27', 60'; Capurro 39', 41'

Umpires:
Hugo Romero (PAR)
Guillermo Poblete (CHI)

7 October 2022
09:30

Uruguay	1–2	Peru
A. López 41'	Report	Dennison 38'; Díaz Espinosa 54'

Umpires:
Hugo Romero (PAR)
Lance Sarabia (USA)

==== Pool B ====
Pos	Team	Pld	W	D	L	GF	GA	GD	Pts	Qualification
1	Chile	3	3	0	0	41	0	+41	9	Semi-finals
2	Brazil	3	2	0	1	18	9	+9	6	Semi-finals
3	Paraguay (H)	3	1	0	2	8	16	−8	3	
4	Bolivia	3	0	0	3	0	42	−42	0	

Source: FIH
Rules for classification: 1) points; 2) matches won; 3) goal difference; 4) goals for; 5) head-to-head result; 6) field goals for.
(H) Hosts

3 October 2022
17:00

Chile	24–0	Bolivia
Renz 2', 52'; Rodríguez 3', 39'; J. Amoroso 4', 7', 9', 16', 26', 45', 47'; Contardo 5', 19', 35'; Richter 8', 22', 49'; Goñi 10'; Hurtado 18', 33'; Strabucchi 34', 45', 50'; Gesswein 50'	Report

Umpires:
Oliver Höck (BRA)
Andrey Umana (CRC)

3 October 2022
19:00

Paraguay	2–6	Brazil
Ruetalo 25'; Rodríguez 47'	Report	Santos 15', 46'; Patrocínio 23'; López 24', 29'; Varela 27'

Umpires:
Joaquín Morini del Castillo (ARG)
Guillermo Poblete (CHI)

5 October 2022
11:30

Brazil	0–7	Chile
	Report	Valenzuela 11'; J. Amoroso 26', 39', 52'; Renz 34'; Richter 45'; Contardo 52'

Umpires:
Lance Sarabia (USA)
Reinier Díaz (CUB)

5 October 2022
17:00

Paraguay	6–0	Bolivia
Vera 2', 16', 42', 50'; Rodríguez 26'; Chamorro 45'	Report

Umpires:
Nathaniel Fuentes (PAN)
Joaquín Morini del Castillo (ARG)

7 October 2022
11:30

Brazil	12–0	Bolivia
Santos 7', 12', 38', 60'; López 10'; Imer 17', 48', 50'; Y. Van der Heijden 38', 44'; Figueiredo 39'; Assis 46'	Report

Umpires:
Andrey Umana (CRC)
Joaquín Morini del Castillo (ARG)

7 October 2022
17:00

Chile	10–0	Paraguay
Richter 14'; Gesswein 15'; J. Amoroso 19', 28', 32', 59'; Pizarro 29'; Rodríguez 32', 54'; Maldonado 49'	Report

Umpires:
Reinier Díaz (CUB)
Oliver Höck (BRA)

=== Fifth to seventh place classification ===
Cross-over
9 October
Uruguay	2
Bolivia	1

Fifth place
11 October
Paraguay	1
Uruguay	2

==== Cross-over ====
9 October 2022
11:45

Uruguay	2–1	Bolivia
G. López 9'; Iglesias 13'	Report	Fadell 51'

Umpires:
Guillermo Poblete (CHI)
Nathaniel Fuentes (PAN)

==== Fifth and sixth place ====
11 October 2022
11:45

Paraguay	1–2	Uruguay
	Report

Umpires:
Oliver Höck (BRA)
Andrey Umana (CRC)

=== Medal round ===
Semi-finals
9 October
Argentina	12
Brazil	0
9 October
Chile	11
Peru	0

Gold medal match
11 October
Argentina	3
Chile	1
Bronze medal match
11 October
Brazil	5
Peru	0

==== Semi-finals ====
9 October 2022
17:00

Argentina	12–0	Brazil
Capurro 8', 58'; Ibarra 15', 58'; Acosta 21', 43'; Rey 29'; Martins 35', 59'; Vila 35'; Ronconi 48', 60'	Report

Umpires:
Reinier Díaz (CUB)
Lance Sarabia (USA)

9 October 2022
19:15

Chile	11–0	Peru
J. Amoroso 1'; Contardo 4', 15', 41'; Strabucchi 16'; Richter 19'; Rodríguez 26'; Renz 33'; Pizarro 50'; Valenzuela 58', 60+'	Report

Umpires:
Joaquín Morini del Castillo (ARG)
Oliver Höck (BRA)

==== Bronze medal match ====
11 October 2022
17:00

Brazil	5–0	Peru
	Report

Umpires:
Joaquín Morini del Castillo (ARG)
Guillermo Poblete (CHI)

==== Gold medal match ====
11 October 2022
19:15

Argentina	3–1	Chile
Ferrero 3'; Capurro 21'; Rey 58'	Report	Valenzuela 55'

Umpires:
Lance Sarabia (USA)
Reinier Díaz (CUB)

=== Final standings ===
Pos	Team	Qualification
1st place, gold medalist(s)	Argentina	2023 Pan American Games
2nd place, silver medalist(s)	Chile	2023 Pan American Games
3rd place, bronze medalist(s)	Brazil	
4	Peru	
5	Uruguay	
6	Paraguay (H)	
7	Bolivia	

Source: FIH
(H) Host

== Women's tournament ==
Tournament details
- Host country: Paraguay
- City: Luque
- Dates: 4–12 October
- Teams: 5 (from 1 confederation)
- Venue: Centro Nacional de Hockey

Final positions
- Champions: Chile (1st title)
- Runner-up: Argentina
- Third place: Uruguay

Tournament statistics
- Matches played: 12
- Goals scored: 94 (7.83 per match)
- Top scorer: (Uruguay) Teresa Viana (9 goals)

=== Preliminary round ===
Pos	Team	Pld	W	D	L	GF	GA	GD	Pts	Qualification
1	Argentina	4	4	0	0	38	1	+37	12	Final
2	Chile	4	2	1	1	23	4	+19	7	Final
3	Uruguay	4	2	1	1	20	1	+19	7	Bronze medal match
4	Paraguay (H)	4	1	0	3	1	25	−24	3	Bronze medal match
5	Peru	4	0	0	4	0	51	−51	0	

Source: FIH
Rules for classification: 1) points; 2) matches won; 3) goal difference; 4) goals for; 5) head-to-head result; 6) field goals for.
(H) Hosts

==== Fixtures ====
4 October 2022
17:00

Peru	0–14	Uruguay
	Report	Viana 9', 20', 44', 48', 52'; Gómez 14'; Vilar 17', 18', 31', 40'; Curutchague 39'; Barrandeguy 48'; Dall'Orso 55'; Algorta 55'

Umpires:
Mariana Reydo (ARG)
Megan Robertson (CAN)

4 October 2022
19:00

Argentina	13–0	Paraguay
Trinchinetti 3', 6'; Adorno 8', 13', 44'; Andrade 11'; Thome 14', 32'; Forcherio 20', 47'; Delpech 34'; Cairó 35', 49'	Report

Umpires:
Natalia Lodeiro (URU)
Claudia Montino (CHI)

5 October 2022
19:00

Chile	16–0	Peru
Jacob 6'; Villagrán 16', 29', 35', 52'; Salas 28', 41', 43', 55'; Arrieta 44', 46', 49', 49', 57', 58'; Solano 45'	Report

Umpires:
Melina Illanes (ARG)
Victoria Pazos (PAR)

6 October 2022
17:00

Paraguay	0–6	Chile
	Report	Jacob 13', 47'; Villagrán 24'; Lagos 28'; Arrieta 29', 30+'

Umpires:
Diana Borrayo (GUA)
Mariana Reydo (ARG)

6 October 2022
19:00

Uruguay	0–1	Argentina
	Report	Trinchinetti 28'

Umpires:
Megan Robertson (CAN)
Ana Vázquez Escalante (MEX)

8 October 2022
17:00

Chile	1–4	Argentina
Urroz 1'	Report	Forcherio 4'; Thome 20'; Andrade 38'; Cairó 41'

Umpires:
Victoria Pazos (PAR)
Natalia Lodeiro (URU)

8 October 2022
19:00

Paraguay	0–6	Uruguay
	Report	Barrandeguy 5', 33'; Viana 36', 57'; Amadeo 54'; Vilar 60'

Umpires:
Claudia Montino (CHI)
Melina Illanes (ARG)

9 October 2022
15:00

Peru	0–1	Paraguay
	Report	Acuna 42'

Umpires:
Ana Vázquez Escalante (MEX)
Melina Illanes (ARG)

10 October 2022
17:00

Uruguay	0–0	Chile
	Report

Umpires:
Mariana Reydo (ARG)
Megan Robertson (CAN)

10 October 2022
19:00

Argentina	20–0	Peru
Forcherio 5'; Palet 5', 41'; Toccalino 6', 19'; Trinchinetti 12', 20', 34'; Sánchez 16'; Adorno 24', 28', 39', 42', 55'; Delpech 26'; Thome 43', 45', 51', 58'; Andrade 49'	Report

Umpires:
Diana Borrayo (GUA)
Claudia Montino (CHI)

=== Medal round ===
==== Bronze medal match ====
12 October 2022
17:00

Uruguay	7–0	Paraguay
Barrandeguy 30', 32'; Dall'Orso 33'; Viana 35', 58'; Carvalho 37', 60'	Report

Umpires:
Melina Illanes (ARG)
Mariana Reydo (ARG)

==== Gold medal match ====
12 October 2022
19:15

Argentina	0–0	Chile
	Report
Penalties
Toccalino (penalty shoot-out missed); Adorno (penalty shoot-out missed); Thome (penalty shoot-out scored); Palet (penalty shoot-out scored); Sánchez (penalty shoot-out missed); Thome (penalty shoot-out missed)	2–3	(penalty shoot-out missed) Tala; (penalty shoot-out scored) Ananías; (penalty shoot-out scored) Khamis; (penalty shoot-out missed) Jacob; (penalty shoot-out missed) Urroz; (penalty shoot-out scored) Ananías

Umpires:
Victoria Pazos (PAR)
Natalia Lodeiro (URU)

=== Final standings ===
Pos	Team	Qualification
1st place, gold medalist(s)	Chile	2023 Pan American Games
2nd place, silver medalist(s)	Argentina	2023 Pan American Games
3rd place, bronze medalist(s)	Uruguay	
4	Paraguay (H)	
5	Peru	

Source: FIH
(H) Host
