= Milagros Seigal =

Uruguayan field hockey player

Personal information
- Full name: Milagros Seigal Varela
- Born: 20 August 2005 (age 21) Uruguay

Sport
- Sport: Field hockey
- Position: Defence
Senior career
Years	Team	Caps	Goals
2022–2026	Old Christians	-	-
2026–	SV Blankenese	-	-
National team
Years	Team	Caps	Goals
2023–2026	Uruguay U–21	18	(1)
2026–	Uruguay	14	(2)
Medal record
Representing Uruguay
Women's field hockey
Pan American Cup
Bronze medal – third place	2025 Montevideo	Team
South American Games
Bronze medal – third place	2026 Santa Fe	Team
Junior Pan American Cup
Bronze medal – third place	2026 Santiago	Team

Milagros Seigal Varela (born 20 August 2005) is a field hockey player from Uruguay.

== Personal life ==
Seigal was born in Uruguay, but spent much of her childhood growing up in Miami, United States.

== Career ==
=== Under–21 ===
Seigal made her debut for the Uruguayan U–21 team in 2023. She was a member of the national squad at the Junior Pan American Cup in Saint Michael, where the team finished fifth.

She competed at her second Junior Pan American Cup in 2024 at the tournament held in Surrey.

At the 2026 Junior Pan American Cup in Santiago she made her final appearances for the national junior team, winning a bronze medal.

=== Las Cimarronas ===
Seigal made her senior international debut for Las Cimarronas in 2025 at the Pan American Cup in Montevideo, earning her first senior cap in the opening match against Argentina. At the tournament Uruguay made history, winning their first ever medal, taking home bronze. During the bronze medal match, she sustained a torn ligament in her knee, sidelining her for the remainder of the 2025 season.

In 2026, Seigal returned to the national team. She was named in the squad for the FIH Nations Cup in Auckland. Her most recent appearances have come at the XIII South American Games in Santa Fe.

== International goals ==
The following is a list of international goals scored by Seigal.

Goal	Date	Location	Opponent	Score	Result	Competition	Ref.
1	3 August 2025	Cancha Celeste, Montevideo, Uruguay	Chile	1–0	2–0	2025 Pan American Cup	
2	19 September 2026	Asociación Santafesina de Hockey, Santa Fe, Argentina	Paraguay	7–0	13–0	XIII South American Games	
