= Magdalena Gómez (field hockey) =

Uruguayan field hockey player

Personal information
- Full name: Magdalena María Gómez Oreggia
- Born: 14 February 1996 (age 30) Uruguay
- Height: 161 cm (5 ft 3 in)
- Weight: 64 kg (141 lb)

Sport
- Sport: Field hockey
- Position: Defence
National team
Years	Team	Caps	Goals
2019–	Uruguay	16	(2)
Medal record
Representing Uruguay
Women's field hockey
South American Games
Bronze medal – third place	2022 Asunción	Team
Bronze medal – third place	2026 Santa Fe	Team

Magdalena María Gómez Oreggia (born 14 February 1996) is a Uruguayan field hockey player, who plays as a defender.

== Career ==
=== Domestic ===
Gómez currently plays for San Lorenzo, in the Argentine national league.

=== Las Cimarronas ===
Gómez made her senior international debut for Las Cimarronas in 2019, during the FIH Series Finals in Hiroshima.

In 2022, she won her first medal with the team, taking home bronze at the South American Games in Asunción.

She was named in the squad and will appear at her second Pan American Games in Santiago.
