= Clementina Cristiani =

Chilean field hockey player

Personal information
- Full name: Clementina Cristiani Nadal
- Born: 10 June 1999 (age 27) Uruguay

Sport
- Sport: Field hockey
- Position: Midfield
Senior career
Years	Team	Caps	Goals
–	Old Christians	-	-
National team
Years	Team	Caps	Goals
2016–2016	Uruguay U–21	6	(0)
2017–	Uruguay	39	(4)
Medal record
Women's field hockey
Representing Uruguay
Pan American Cup
Bronze medal – third place	2025 Montevideo	Team
South American Games
Bronze medal – third place	2026 Santa Fe	Team

Clementina Cristiani Nadal (born 10 June 1999) is a field hockey player from Uruguay.

== Career ==
=== Under–21 ===
Cristiani formerly represented the Uruguay U–21 team. She made her first and only appearances for the side in 2016 at the Junior Pan American Cup in Tacarigua, where the team finished in fifth place.

=== Las Cimarronas ===
In 2017, Cristiani made her senior international debut. She was a member of the Cimarronas squad at the Pan American Cup in Lancaster.

Following her debut, Cristiani was a regular member of the national squad throughout 2018 and 2019. She made appearances in the 2018–19 FIH Hockey Series in Santiago and Hiroshima, as well the XVIII Pan American Games in Lima.

She took a six-year break from the national team, returning to the side in 2025. Her first appearances back with the squad came at the Pan American Cup in Montevideo. At the tournament Uruguay made history, winning their first ever bronze medal.

Her most recent appearances for the national squad came at the XIII South American Games in Santa Fe.

== International goals ==
The following is a list of international goals scored by Cristiani.

Goal	Date	Location	Opponent	Score	Result	Competition	Ref.
1	11 August 2017	Spooky Nook Sports, Lancaster, United States	Brazil	4–0	8–0	2017 Pan American Cup	
2	31 July 2019	Peruvian Sports Institute, Lima, Peru	Cuba	5–0	8–1	XVIII Pan American Games	
3	13 September 2026	Asociación Santafesina de Hockey, Santa Fe, Argentina	Peru	2–0	12–0	XIII South American Games	
4	19 September 2026	Asociación Santafesina de Hockey, Santa Fe, Argentina	Paraguay	4–0	13–0	XIII South American Games	
