= Daiana Pacheco =

Argentine field hockey player

Personal information
- Born: 4 April 2002 (age 24) Córdoba, Argentina
- Height: 1.69 m (5 ft 7 in)
- Weight: 60 kg (132 lb)

Sport
- Sport: Field hockey
- Position: Forward
- Club: Urú Curé
Senior career
Years	Team	Caps	Goals
–2020	Barrio Parque	-	-
2021–2023	River Plate	-	-
2024–2025	Unión Deportiva Taburiente	-	-
2025–	Urú Curé	-	-
National team
Years	Team	Caps	Goals
2021–2023	Argentina U21	10	(5)
2021–present	Argentina	11	(2)
Medal record
World Cup
Silver medal – second place	2022 Terrassa/Amstelveen
South American Games
Gold medal – first place	2026 Santa Fe
Junior World Cup
Silver medal – second place	2023 Santiago
Pan American Junior Championship
Silver medal – second place	2023 Bridgetown

Daiana Pacheco (born 4 April 2002) is an Argentine field hockey player.

== Hockey career ==
In 2021, Pacheco was called into the senior national women's team.
