= Valentina Raposo =

Argentine field hockey player

Personal information
- Full name: Valentina Raposo Ruiz de los Llanos
- Born: 28 January 2003 (age 23) Salta, Argentina
- Height: 1.72 m (5 ft 8 in)
- Weight: 64 kg (141 lb)

Sport
- Sport: Field hockey
- Position: Defender
- Club: Popeye
Senior career
Years	Team	Caps	Goals
–present	Popeye	-	-
National team
Years	Team	Caps	Goals
2021–present	Argentina	14	(3)
Medal record
Olympic Games
Silver medal – second place	2020 Tokyo	Team
Bronze medal – third place	2024 Paris	Team
World Cup
Gold medal – first place	2026 Wavre/Amstelveen
Silver medal – second place	2022 Terrassa/Amstelveen
Pan American Games
Gold medal – first place	2023 Santiago	Team
Pan American Cup
Gold medal – first place	2022 Santiago
Gold medal – first place	2025 Montevideo
Junior World Cup
Silver medal – second place	2023 Santiago
Pan American Junior Championship
Silver medal – second place	2023 Bridgetown

Valentina Raposo Ruiz de los Llanos (born 28 January 2003) is an Argentine field hockey player. She plays with the Argentina national field hockey team, winning silver medal at the 2020 Summer Olympics.

== Hockey career ==
In 2021, Raposo was called into the senior national women's team. She was the youngest player on the Argentina national team.
