= 2023 Women's Junior Pan American Championship =

Women's field hockey tournament

Tournament details
- Host country: Barbados
- City: Bridgetown
- Dates: 10–18 April
- Teams: 7 (from 1 confederation)
- Venue: Wildey Hockey Centre

Final positions
- Champions: United States (2nd title)
- Runner-up: Argentina
- Third place: Chile

Tournament statistics
- Matches played: 15
- Goals scored: 113 (7.53 per match)
- Top scorer(s): (Chile) Victoria Arrieta (Uruguay) Carolina Curcio (7 goals)
- Best player: (United States) Abigail Tamer
- Best goalkeeper: (Canada) Kayla Desormeau

The 2023 Women's Junior Pan American Championship was the 13th edition of the Women's Pan American Junior Championship, the biennial women's international under-21 field hockey championship of the Americas organized by the Pan American Hockey Federation. It was scheduled to be held from 10 to 18 April 2023 in Bridgetown, Barbados.

The tournament served as a direct qualifier for the 2023 Junior World Cup, held in Santiago, Chile in December 2023, with the three best teams alongside the Junior World Cup hosts Chile qualifying.

The United States won their second title by defeating Argentina 4–1 in a shoot-out after the match finished 1–1. Chile won the bronze medal by defeating the defending champions Canada 5–1.

== Preliminary round ==
=== Pool A ===
Pos	Team	Pld	W	D	L	GF	GA	GD	Pts	Qualification
1	Argentina	2	2	0	0	6	0	+6	6	Semi-finals
2	United States	2	1	0	1	4	3	+1	3	Semi-finals
3	Uruguay	2	0	0	2	1	8	−7	0	

Source: FIH
Rules for classification: 1) points; 2) matches won; 3) goal difference; 4) goals for; 5) head-to-head result; 6) field goals for.

10 April 2023
15:30

Argentina	4–0	Uruguay
Santamarina 30'; Raposo 37'; Casas 49'; Ferola 60'	Report

Umpires:
Meghan McLennan (CAN)
Richanne Gaskin (BAR)

12 April 2023
11:00

United States	0–2	Argentina
	Report	Bruggesser 4'; Santamarina 52'

Umpires:
Claudia Montino (CHI)
Meghan McLennan (CAN)

14 April 2023
10:00

Uruguay	1–4	United States
Civetta 52'	Report	Bent-Cole 21', 37'; Mendez-Trendler 22'; Tamer 53'

Umpires:
Victoria Pazos (PAR)
Claudia Montino (CHI)

=== Pool B ===
Pos	Team	Pld	W	D	L	GF	GA	GD	Pts	Qualification
1	Chile	3	3	0	0	31	0	+31	9	Semi-finals
2	Canada	3	2	0	1	23	3	+20	6	Semi-finals
3	Guyana	3	1	0	2	3	20	−17	3	
4	Barbados (H)	3	0	0	3	0	34	−34	0	

Source: FIH
Rules for classification: 1) points; 2) matches won; 3) goal difference; 4) goals for; 5) head-to-head result; 6) field goals for.
(H) Hosts

11 April 2023
09:00

Chile	20–0	Barbados
Obon 2'; Valdés 7', 10', 22', 48'; Muñoz 8'; Ma. Gago 13'; Gutiérrez 22'; Arrieta 23', 43', 44', 53', 54'; Irazoqui 29', 55'; Lira 42', 47'; Müller 45', 59'; Goñi 45'	Report

Umpires:
Allison Mikelson (USA)
Melina Millanes (ARG)

11 April 2023
10:00

Canada	12–0	Guyana
Kuzyk 2', 23', 33', 40'; Mackesy 16', 48', 56'; Struchtrup 27'; Girgis 30'; McCusker 45'; L. Delmotte 47'; Govan 55'	Report

Umpires:
Victoria Pazos (PAR)
Sofia Aleman (URU)

12 April 2023
13:30

Barbados	0–3	Guyana
	Report	Cadogan 2', 47'; Fernandes 8'

Umpires:
Melina Illanes (ARG)
Sofia Aleman (URU)

13 April 2023
10:00

Canada	0–3	Chile
	Report	Ma. Gago 10', 33'; Gutiérrez 26'

Umpires:
Victoria Pazos (PAR)
Allison Mikelson (USA)

14 April 2023
12:00

Chile	8–0	Guyana
Lira 3', 10'; Müller 15'; Irazoqui 32'; Gutiérrez 40'; Obon 49'; Arrieta 58', 59'	Report

Umpires:
Meghan McLennan (CAN)
Richanne Gaskin (BAR)

14 April 2023
15:30

Barbados	0–11	Canada
	Report	Mackesy 10', 23', 47'; McCusker 12'; Struchtrup 21', 28', 33', 48'; Govan 23'; Kuzyk 42'; Kennedy 50'

Umpires:
Allison Mikelson (USA)
Melina Llanes (ARG)

== Classification round ==
=== Fifth to seventh place classification ===
Cross-over
16 April
Uruguay	20
Barbados	0

Fifth place
18 April
Guyana	0
Uruguay	14

=== Crossover ===
16 April 2023
09:45

Uruguay	20–0	Barbados
Seigal 3'; Lemoine 4', 39'; Rodríguez 8'; Mari 9'; Civetta 14', 18'; Curcio 21', 28', 44'; Pérez 26'; G. Curutchague 36', 45'; Díaz 38', 48'; Reyes 39'; Arregui 43'; J. Curutchague 45', 60'; Carassale 50'	Report

Umpires:
Claudia Montino (CHI)
Meghan McLennan (CAN)

=== Fifth and sixth place ===
18 April 2023
09:45

Guyana	0–14	Uruguay
	Report	Curcio 4', 18', 19', 20'; Díaz 5', 50'; Civetta 6', 8', 24'; Pérez 9', 30'; Rodríguez 21', 37'; Arregui 49'

Umpires:
Claudia Montino (CHI)
Richanne Gaskin (BAR)

== Final round ==
=== Bracket ===
Semi-finals
16 April
Argentina	1
Canada	0
16 April
United States (p.s.o.)	1 (2)
Chile	1 (0)

Final
18 April
Argentina	1 (1)
United States (p.s.o.)	1 (4)
Third place
18 April
Canada	1
Chile	5

=== Semi-finals ===
16 April 2023
12:30

Argentina	1–0	Canada
Pacheco 31'	Report

Umpires:
Victoria Pazos (PAR)
Allison Mikelson (USA)

16 April 2023
15:30

United States	1–1	Chile
Tamer 36'	Report	Lira 40'
Penalties
Heck (penalty shoot-out scored); Dixon (penalty shoot-out missed); Wadas (penalty shoot-out scored); Bent-Cole (penalty shoot-out missed)	2–0	(penalty shoot-out missed) Valdés; (penalty shoot-out missed) Pérez; (penalty shoot-out missed) Mi. Gago; (penalty shoot-out missed) Irazoqui

Umpires:
Melina Illanes (ARG)
Meghan McLennan (CAN)

=== Third and fourth place ===
18 April 2023
12:30

Canada	1–5	Chile
Kuzyk 37'	Report	Ma. Gago 20'; Goñi 27'; Irazoqui 30'; Gutiérrez 40'; Muñoz 49'

Umpires:
Sofia Aleman (URU)
Allison Mikelson (USA)

=== Final ===
18 April 2023
15:30

Argentina	1–1	United States
Raposo 36'	Report	Underwood 45'
Penalties
Iacoponi (penalty shoot-out missed); Bruggesser (penalty shoot-out missed); Pagella (penalty shoot-out scored)	1–4	(penalty shoot-out scored) Heck; (penalty shoot-out scored) Wadas; (penalty shoot-out scored) Tamer; (penalty shoot-out scored) Underwood

Umpires:
Victoria Pazos (PAR)
Meghan McLennan (CAN)

== Statistics ==
=== Final standings ===
Pos	Team	Qualification
1	United States	2023 Junior World Cup
2	Argentina	2023 Junior World Cup
3	Chile	2023 Junior World Cup
4	Canada	2023 Junior World Cup
5	Uruguay	
6	Guyana	
7	Barbados (H)	

Source: FIH
(H) Host

=== Goalscorers ===
There were 113 goals scored in 15 matches, for an average of 7.53 goals per match.

7 goals

- (Chile) Victoria Arrieta
- (Uruguay) Carolina Curcio

6 goals

- (Canada) Allison Kuzyk
- (Canada) Mallory Mackesy
- (Uruguay) Elisa Civetta

5 goals

- (Canada) Nora Struchtrup
- (Chile) Martina Lira

4 goals

- (Chile) Martina Gago
- (Chile) Josefina Gutiérrez
- (Chile) Francisca Irazoqui
- (Chile) Dominga Valdés
- (Uruguay) Agustina Díaz

3 goals

- (Chile) Laura Müller
- (Uruguay) Paula Pérez
- (Uruguay) María Rodríguez

2 goals

- (Argentina) Valentina Raposo
- (Argentina) Paula Santamarina
- (Canada) Imogen Govan
- (Canada) Brooke McCusker
- (Chile) María Goñi
- (Chile) Constanza Muñoz
- (Chile) Monserrat Obon
- (Guyana) Abosaide Cadogan
- (United States) Olivia Bent-Cole
- (United States) Abigail Tamer
- (Uruguay) Justina Arregui
- (Uruguay) Jacinta Curutchague
- (Uruguay) Guadalupe Curutchague
- (Uruguay) Pilar Lemoine

1 goal

- (Argentina) Brisa Bruggesser
- (Argentina) Lara Casas
- (Argentina) Valentina Ferola
- (Argentina) Daiana Pacheco
- (Canada) Laine Delmotte
- (Canada) Kenzie Girgis
- (Canada) McKinley Kennedy
- (Guyana) Georgiana Fernandes
- (United States) Daniela Mendez-Trendler
- (United States) Reagan Underwood
- (Uruguay) Guillermina Carassale
- (Uruguay) Josefina Mari
- (Uruguay) Josefina Reyes
- (Uruguay) Milagros Seigal

Source: FIH

== See also ==
- 2023 Men's Junior Pan American Championship
