= Juana Castellaro =

Argentine field hockey player (born 2005)

Personal information
- Full name: Juana Castellaro Morello
- Born: 29 March 2005 (age 21) Buenos Aires, Argentina

Sport
- Sport: Field hockey
- Position: Defender
- Club: River Plate
Senior career
Years	Team	Caps	Goals
–present	River Plate	-	-
National team
Years	Team	Caps	Goals
2022–Present	Argentina	4	-
Medal record
Olympic Games
Bronze medal – third place	2024 Paris	Team
World Cup
Gold medal – first place	2026 Wavre/Amstelveen
Pro League
Silver medal – second place	Season Four
Pan American Games
Gold medal – first place	2023 Santiago	Team
Pan American Cup
Gold medal – first place	2025 Montevideo
FIH Junior World Cup
Silver medal – second place	2023 Santiago
Silver medal – second place	2025 Santiago	Team
Junior Pan American Games
Gold medal – first place	2025 Asunción	Team
Pan American Junior Championship
Silver medal – second place	2023 Bridgetown
South American Youth Games
Gold medal – first place	2022 Rosario

Juana Castellaro Morello (Note: In this Spanish name, the first or paternal surname is Castellaro and the second or maternal family name is Morello.) (born 29 March 2005) is an Argentine field hockey player.

== Hockey career ==
In 2022, Castellaro was first called into the U21 Argentina team. Later that month, she was also part of the U18 team that competed in the 2022 South American Youth Games. Because of an outstanding performance in both competitions, she was kept in the U21 team and called into the senior team as Lucina von der Heyde was dismissed.
