= Sol Pagella =

Argentine field hockey player

Personal information
- Born: 26 February 2002 (age 24) Buenos Aires, Argentina

Sport
- Sport: Field hockey
- Position: Forward
- Club: San Fernando
Senior career
Years	Team	Caps	Goals
–2021	San Andres	-	-
2021–present	San Fernando	-	-
National team
Years	Team	Caps	Goals
2021–present	Argentina	5	(1)
Medal record
South American Games
Gold medal – first place	2026 Santa Fe
Junior World Cup
Silver medal – second place	2023 Santiago
Pan American Junior Championship
Silver medal – second place	2023 Bridgetown

Sol Pagella (born 26 February 2002) is an Argentine field hockey player.

== Hockey career ==
In 2021, Pagella was called into the senior national women's team.
