= Catalina Andrade =

Argentine field hockey player

Personal information
- Born: 7 February 2002 (age 24) Buenos Aires, Argentina
- Height: 163 cm (5 ft 4 in)
- Weight: 57 kg (126 lb)

Sport
- Sport: Field hockey
- Position: Midfield
- Club: Italiano
National team
Years	Team	Caps	Goals
2022–2023	Argentina U–21	15	(2)
2022–	Argentina	32	(10)
Medal record
Women's field hockey
Representing Argentina
South American Games
Gold medal – first place	2026 Santa Fe	Team
Silver medal – second place	2022 Asunción	Team
FIH Pro League
Silver medal – second place	Season Four	Team
Silver medal – second place	Season Six	Team
Bronze medal – third place	Season Five	Team
FIH Junior World Cup
Silver medal – second place	2023 Santiago	Team
Junior Pan American Cup
Silver medal – second place	2023 St. Michael	Team

Catalina Andrade (born 7 February 2002) is an international field hockey player from Argentina.

== Personal life ==
Andrade was born and raised in Buenos Aires, Argentina.

== Career ==
=== Domestic league ===
In the Metropolitano de Hockey, Andrade competes for Club Italiano.

=== Junior national team ===
She made her debut for the Argentine U–21 team in 2022 at the FIH Junior World Cup in Potchefstroom.

In 2023 she won her first medal with the junior national team, taking home silver at the Junior Pan American Cup in St. Michael. She made her final appearances for the squad later that year at her second FIH Junior World Cup, held in Santiago, where she won a silver medal.

=== Las Leonas ===
She made her senior international debut for Las Leonas at the XII South American Games in Asunción. At the tournament she won a silver medal.

Since her debut, she has appeared in seasons four, five, six and seven of the FIH Pro League.
