= Makenzy Beard =

Welsh artist

Makenzy Beard is a Welsh artist from Swansea, South Wales. She began her painting journey in March of 2020 at the age of 14, at a time when lockdown halted many people's activities. Since then, Beard has held a number of solo exhibitions. Her career brought her notoriety when she published images of her painting depicting her neighbour and local farmer; John Tucker. Later, In 2022, she held her first solo exhibition at Oriel Blackwater based in Cardiff. She did not receive any paid lessons until the end of 2024. One of her first paintings was exhibited at the Royal Academy of Arts.

She attended Bishopston Comprehensive School (a state-funded school) until she won a scholarship to Millfield, an independent private school with boarding and day school facilities on a hockey and art scholarship. She attended Millfield from 2023 onwards and via the school, she was able to play for the Wales U18 and U21 hockey teams.

Beard, raised in a family with a professional background setting in the creative arts, had some help from her mother, Hannah Lee Davies, (who's an architectural, interior designer and fine artist and associate of urban foundry). Hannah is a painter, designer, and professional in the field of interior architecture; she was accepted to study fine art at Parsons School of Design in both Paris and New York.

David John Beard, her father, is an academic, and a medical researcher specialising in surgical sciences and musculoskeletal at the University of Oxford; he also holds a professional role at the University of Sydney, after he received an honorary fellowship from the Royal College of Surgeons of England.

Initially, Beard began experimenting with portraitures during the COVID-19 lockdowns, using her mother's studio as a means of exploring and adapting her work. Her mother also played a role in the artistic development of her daughter. In her professional biography, written and published by Lower Leigh Atelier, mentions: "In the last few years she has focused on her prodigy daughter, Makenzy Beard in her painting trajectory".

Beard's early paintings are often described as the work of a self-taught artist by herself and by mainstream media, however, she was first introduced to the medium within a home environment that had an established artistic background.

In 2026 Beard competed in Sky's (British TV channel) Artist of the Year competition.
