= María Rodríguez (field hockey) =

Uruguayan field hockey player

Personal information
- Full name: María Eugenia Rodríguez Giménez
- Born: 25 December 2006 (age 19) Uruguay

Sport
- Sport: Field hockey
- Position: Forward
Senior career
- Years: Team
- –: Náutico
National team
Years	Team	Caps	Goals
2023–	Uruguay U–21	25	(8)
2026–	Uruguay	8	(4)
Medal record
Representing Uruguay
Women's field hockey
South American Games
Bronze medal – third place	2026 Santa Fe	Team
Junior Pan American Cup
Bronze medal – third place	2026 Santiago	Team

María Eugenia Rodríguez Giménez (born 25 December 2006) is a field hockey player from Uruguay.

== Career ==
=== Under–21 ===
Rodríguez made her debut for the Uruguayan U–21 team in 2023. At just seventeen years of age, she was one of the youngest players in the squad at the Junior Pan American Cup in Saint Michael, where the team finished fifth.

She is still an active member of the national junior team, having competed at two more editions of the Junior Pan American Cup, the Junior Pan American Games and an FIH Junior World Cup. Most notably, she won bronze at the 2026 Junior Pan American Cup in Santiago.

=== Las Cimarronas ===
Rodríguez made her senior international debut for Las Cimarronas in 2026 at the FIH World Cup Qualifiers in Hyderabad, earning her first senior cap in a match against Wales. Her most recent appearances have come at the XIII South American Games in Santa Fe.

== International goals ==
The following is a list of international goals scored by Rodríguez.

Goal	Date	Location	Opponent	Score	Result	Competition	Ref.
1	19 September 2026	Asociación Santafesina de Hockey, Santa Fe, Argentina	Paraguay	9–0	13–0	XIII South American Games	
2	19 September 2026	Asociación Santafesina de Hockey, Santa Fe, Argentina	Paraguay	10–0	13–0	XIII South American Games	
3	19 September 2026	Asociación Santafesina de Hockey, Santa Fe, Argentina	Paraguay	11–0	13–0	XIII South American Games	
4	19 September 2026	Asociación Santafesina de Hockey, Santa Fe, Argentina	Paraguay	12–0	13–0	XIII South American Games	
