= Field hockey at the 2025 Junior Pan American Games – Women's tournament =

Women's field hockey at the 2025 Junior Pan American Games
Tournament details
- Host country: Paraguay
- City: Luque
- Dates: 10–19 August
- Teams: 8 (from 1 confederation)
- Venue: Olympic Park

Final positions
- Champions: Argentina (1st title)
- Runner-up: United States
- Third place: Chile

Tournament statistics
- Matches played: 19
- Goals scored: 104 (5.47 per match)
- Top scorer: (United States) Alaina McVeigh (11 goals)

The women's field hockey tournaments at the 2025 Junior Pan American Games held at the National Hockey Center, located in the Olympic Park in Luque.

== Qualification ==
Qualification	Date	Host/Country	Berths	Qualified team
Host country	—N/a		1	Paraguay
2024 Junior Pan American Championship	3–12 July 2024	Surrey	5	Argentina; Canada; Chile; United States; Uruguay
2025 Junior Pan American Challenge	8–16 March 2025	Bridgetown	2	Mexico; ~~Puerto Rico~~; Guyana
Total			8	

== Preliminary round ==
All times are local (UTC−3).

=== Pool A ===
Pos	Team	Pld	W	D	L	GF	GA	GD	Pts	Qualification
1	Argentina	3	3	0	0	21	0	+21	9	Semi-finals
2	Uruguay	3	2	0	1	5	3	+2	6	Semi-finals
3	Canada	3	1	0	2	2	9	−7	3	
4	Paraguay (H)	3	0	0	3	0	16	−16	0	

Source: FIH
Rules for classification: 1) points; 2) matches won; 3) goal difference; 4) goals for; 5) head-to-head result; 6) field goals for.
(H) Hosts

11 August 2025
17:30

Argentina	3–0	Uruguay
D. Persoglia 4'; Guignet 27'; P. Pisthón 36'	Report

Umpires:
Catalina Wenzel (CHI)
Katelyn Makovec (USA)

11 August 2025
19:30

Canada	2–0	Paraguay
Hundal 27'; Novak 58'	Report

Umpires:
Marisa Miro (PUR)
Erika Barbera (USA)

13 August 2025
17:30

Canada	0–6	Argentina
	Report	Guignet 12'; Alastra 25', 26', 47'; P. Pisthón 38', 51'

Umpires:
Sofia Aleman (URU)
Erika Barbera (USA)

13 August 2025
19:30

Uruguay	2–0	Paraguay
Martinez 20'; Arregui 21'	Report

Umpires:
Marisa Miro (PUR)
Macarena Dieni (ARG)

15 August 2025
17:30

Uruguay	3–0	Canada
Ch. Curcio 29'; Ca. Curcio 38'; Bonaudi 58'	Report

Umpires:
Victoria Pazos (PAR)
Marisa MIRO (PUR)

15 August 2025
19:30

Argentina	12–0	Paraguay
Olalla 4'; L. Pisthón 8', 59'; Casas 8', 11', 24'; Di Santo 9'; Raposo 36'; Guignet 38'; Falasco 44'; Castellaro 52'; Duportal 55'	Report

Umpires:
Catalina Wenzel (CHI)
Erika Barbera (USA)

=== Pool B ===
Pos	Team	Pld	W	D	L	GF	GA	GD	Pts	Qualification
1	United States	3	3	0	0	23	0	+23	9	Semi-finals
2	Chile	3	2	0	1	16	7	+9	6	Semi-finals
3	Mexico	3	1	0	2	11	13	−2	3	
4	Guyana	3	0	0	3	2	32	−30	0	

Source: FIH
Rules for classification: 1) points; 2) matches won; 3) goal difference; 4) goals for; 5) head-to-head result; 6) field goals for.

11 August 2025
09:30

United States	8–0	Mexico
McVeigh 3', 5'; Bianco 15'; Masters 21'; Schenk 27', 56'; Beach 49'; Moore 57'	Report

Umpires:
Macarena Dieni (ARG)
Ricardo Albertz (CHI)

11 August 2025
11:30

Chile	12–1	Guyana
J. Gutiérrez 6', 16', 51', 60'; Saenz 9'; Messen 13'; Rojas 15+'; Salamanca 29'; Caravia 32'; C. González 42'; Luders 52'; Barrios 54'	Report	Klautky 44'

Umpires:
Nora Struchtrup (CAN)
Sofia Aleman (URU)

13 August 2025
09:30

Mexico	9–1	Guyana
Moreno 5'; Castillo 14'; Espinoza 16', 37', 43', 51'; Ortíz 34'; Guzman 34'; Noria 50'	Report	Poole 30'

Umpires:
Catalina Wenzel (CHI)
Katelyn Makovec (USA)

13 August 2025
11:30

Chile	0–4	United States
	Report	McVeigh 4', 6', 46'; Bradford 58'

Umpires:
Victoria Pazos (PAR)
Nora Struchtrup (CAN)

15 August 2025
09:30

United States	11–0	Guyana
Clause 13'; McVeigh 18', 21', 51', 52'; Bradford 20'; Schenk 29', 55'; Wollerton 34', 42'; Moore 43'	Report

Umpires:
Sofia Aleman (URU)
Nora Struchtrup (CAN)

15 August 2025
11:30

Mexico	2–4	Chile
Guzman 14'; Espinoza 29'	Report	Luders 2', 18'; Caravia 30+'; Arrieta 53'

Umpires:
Katelyn Makovec (USA)
Macarena Dieni (ARG)

== Fifth to eighth place classification ==
=== Bracket ===
Cross-overs
17 August
Canada	4
Guyana	0
17 August
Paraguay	1
Mexico	4

Fifth place
19 August
Canada	0
Mexico	0
Seventh place
19 August
Guyana	0
Paraguay	4

=== Cross-overs ===
17 August 2025
09:30

Canada	4–0	Guyana
Novak 12'; Hundal 15'; Piper 19'; Le 44'	Report

Umpires:
Ricardo Albertz (CHI)
Catalina Wenzel (CHI)

17 August 2025
11:45

Paraguay	1–4	Mexico
Sanabria 48'	Report	Cruz 8'; Ortíz 29'; Espinoza 44', 57'

Umpires:
Claudio Martinez (URU)
Sofia Aleman (URU)

=== Seventh and eighth place ===
19 August 2025
09:30

Guyana	0–4	Paraguay
	Report	Barreto 24'; Ciccioli 34'; Duarte 39'; Doldan 49'

Umpires:
Macarena Dieni (ARG)
Marisa Miro (PUR)

=== Fifth and sixth place ===
19 August 2025
11:45

Canada	Cancelled (Note: Extreme weather conditions the Women’s 5/6 Place Match scheduled for today is cancelled.)	Mexico
	Report

Umpires:
Gaston Folcher (ARG)
Catalina Wenzel (CHI)

== Medal round ==
=== Bracket ===
Semi-finals
17 August
Argentina	4
Chile	1
17 August
Uruguay	1
United States	2

Final
19 August
Argentina	3
United States	0
Bronze medal
19 August
Chile (p.s.o.)	0 (3)
Uruguay	0 (2)

=== Semi-finals ===
17 August 2025
17:30

Argentina	4–1	Chile
Alastra 9', 45', 48'; Castellaro 32'	Report	Solari 30'

Umpires:
Katelyn Makovec (USA)
Erika Barbera (USA)

17 August 2025
19:45

Uruguay	1–2	United States
Martinez 49'	Report	McVeigh 13', 17'

Umpires:
Macarena Dieni (ARG)
Marisa Miro (PUR)

=== Bronze medal match ===
19 August 2025
17:30

Chile	0–0	Uruguay
	Report
Penalties
Sáenz (penalty shoot-out scored); Gutiérrez (penalty shoot-out missed); Messen (penalty shoot-out missed); F. Barrios (penalty shoot-out scored); Parada (penalty shoot-out scored)	3–2	(penalty shoot-out missed) Guerrero; (penalty shoot-out scored) Arregui; (penalty shoot-out scored) Martínez; (penalty shoot-out missed) Rodríguez; (penalty shoot-out missed) Ch. Curcio

Umpires:
Katelyn Makovec (USA)
Erika Barbera (USA)

=== Gold medal match ===
19 August 2025
19:45

Argentina	3–0	United States
L. Pisthón 8', 31'; Casas 56'	Report

Umpires:
Victoria Pazos (PAR)
Nora Struchtrup (CAN)

== Statistics ==
=== Final standings ===
Pos	Team	Qualification
1st place, gold medalist(s)	Argentina	2027 Pan American Games
2nd place, silver medalist(s)	United States	
3rd place, bronze medalist(s)	Chile	
4	Uruguay	
5	Canada	
6	Mexico	
7	Paraguay (H)	
8	Guyana	

Source: FIH
(H) Host

=== Goalscorers ===
There were 104 goals scored in 19 matches, for an average of 5.47 goals per match.

11 goals

- (United States) Alaina McVeigh

7 goals

- (Mexico) Valeria Espinoza

6 goals

- (Argentina) Milagros Alastra

4 goals

- (Argentina) Lara Casas
- (Argentina) Lourdes Pisthón
- (Chile) Josefina Gutiérrez
- (United States) Talia Schenk

3 goals

- (Argentina) Sol Guignet
- (Argentina) Pilar Pisthón
- (Chile) Josefa Luders

2 goals

- (Argentina) Juana Castellaro
- (Canada) Prabnoor Hundal
- (Canada) Rylie Novak
- (Chile) Isidora Caravia
- (Mexico) Fernanda Guzman
- (Mexico) Cristina Ortíz
- (United States) Maci Bradford
- (United States) Ava Moore
- (United States) Rylie Wollerton
- (Uruguay) Sol Martínez

1 goal

- (Argentina) Maria Di Santo
- (Argentina) Maxima Duportal
- (Argentina) Victoria Falasco
- (Argentina) Sol Olalla
- (Argentina) Delfina Persoglia
- (Argentina) Barbara Raposo
- (Canada) Sydney Le
- (Canada) Elise Piper
- (Chile) Victoria Arrieta
- (Chile) Florencia Barrios
- (Chile) Camila González
- (Chile) Sofía Messen
- (Chile) Catalina Rojas
- (Chile) Javiera Saenz
- (Chile) Laura Salamanca
- (Chile) Jacinta Solari
- (Guyana) Sarah Klautky
- (Guyana) Makaylah Poole
- (Mexico) Nancy Castillo
- (Mexico) Melanie Cruz
- (Mexico) Brenda Moreno
- (Mexico) Ximena Noria
- (Paraguay) Mia Barreto
- (Paraguay) Jessica Ciccioli
- (Paraguay) Ximena Doldan
- (Paraguay) Astrid Duarte
- (Paraguay) Abril Sanabria
- (United States) Ella Beach
- (United States) Isabella Bianco
- (United States) Milaw Clause
- (United States) Lauren Masters
- (Uruguay) Justina Arregui
- (Uruguay) Silvina Bonaudi
- (Uruguay) Carolina Curcio
- (Uruguay) Chiara Curcio

Source: FIH
