= Agustina Díaz =

Chilean field hockey player

Personal information
- Full name: María Agustina Díaz Montemurro
- Born: 7 November 2003 (age 22) Montevideo, Uruguay

Sport
- Sport: Field hockey
- Position: Forward
Senior career
Years	Team	Caps	Goals
–	Real Sociedad	-	-
National team
Years	Team	Caps	Goals
2022–2024	Uruguay U–21	16	(7)
2025–	Uruguay	18	(7)
Medal record
Representing Uruguay
Women's field hockey
Pan American Cup
Bronze medal – third place	2025 Montevideo	Team
South American Games
Bronze medal – third place	2026 Santa Fe	Team
Women's indoor hockey
Indoor Pan American Cup
Bronze medal – third place	2024 Calgary	Team

María Agustina Díaz Montemurro (born 7 November 2003) is a field and indoor hockey player from Uruguay.

== Personal life ==
Agustina Díaz was born and raised in Montevideo, Uruguay.

== Indoor hockey ==
In 2024, Díaz was a member of the Uruguayan indoor team at the Indoor Pan American Cup in Calgary, where she won a bronze medal.

== Field hockey ==
=== Under–21 ===
From 2022 to 2024 Díaz was a member of the Uruguay U–21 team. Throughout her junior career, she represented the national team at one edition of the FIH Junior World Cup and two editions of the Junior Pan American Cup. During this time she amassed 16 caps, scoring 7 goals.

=== Las Cimarronas ===
Díaz made her senior international debut in 2025. She was included in the squad for the Pan American Cup in Montevideo, helping the team to an historic bronze medal.

Throughout 2026, Díaz has been a regular inclusion in the national squad. She has made appearances at the FIH World Cup Qualifiers in Hyderabad, the FIH Nations Cup in Auckland, and most recentlty at the XIII South American Games in Santa Fe.

== International goals ==
The following is a list of international goals scored by Díaz.

Goal	Date	Location	Opponent	Score	Result	Competition	Ref.
1	24 July 2025	Cancha Celeste, Montevideo, Uruguay	Paraguay	8–0	8–0	2025 Pan American Cup	
2	9 March 2026	G. M. C. Balayogi Hockey Stadium, Hyderabad, India	Wales	2–1	3–2	2026 FIH World Cup Qualifiers	
3	13 September 2026	Asociación Santafesina de Hockey, Santa Fe, Argentina	Peru	5–0	12–0	XIII South American Games	
4	13 September 2026	Asociación Santafesina de Hockey, Santa Fe, Argentina	Peru	6–0	12–0	XIII South American Games	
5	13 September 2026	Asociación Santafesina de Hockey, Santa Fe, Argentina	Peru	8–0	12–0	XIII South American Games	
6	19 September 2026	Asociación Santafesina de Hockey, Santa Fe, Argentina	Paraguay	3–0	13–0	XIII South American Games	
7	19 September 2026	Asociación Santafesina de Hockey, Santa Fe, Argentina	Paraguay	8–0	13–0	XIII South American Games	
