= Victoria Arrieta =

Chilean field hockey player

Personal information
- Full name: Victoria Paz Arrieta Mesías
- Born: 27 September 2004 (age 22) Santiago, Chile

Sport
- Sport: Field hockey
- Position: Midfield
Senior career
| Years | Team | Caps | Goals |
| – | Club Manqeuhue | - | - |
National team
| Years | Team | Caps | Goals |
| 2023–2025 | Chile U–21 | 29 | (12) |
| 2026– | Chile | 4 | (2) |
Medal record
Women's field hockey
Representing Chile
Junior Pan American Games
| Bronze medal – third place | 2025 Asunción | Team |
Junior Pan American Cup
| Bronze medal – third place | 2023 Saint Michael | Team |
| Bronze medal – third place | 2024 Surrey | Team |

Victoria Paz Arrieta Mesías (born 27 September 2004) is a field hockey player from Chile.

== Personal life ==
Her sister, Fernanda, is also an international field hockey player.

== Career ==
=== Under–21 ===
Arrieta was a member of the Chilean U–21 team from 2023 to 2025. During this time, she represented the squad at a number of major tournaments, including two editions of the Junior Pan American Cup, the Junior Pan American Games and two FIH Junior World Cups.

During her junior career, she amassed 29 caps, scored 12 goals and won 3 bronze medals.

=== Las Diablas ===
In 2026, Arrieta was named in Las Diablas squad for the first time. She made her senior international debut during the XIII South American Games in Santa Fe. She earned her first cap in a pool match against Paraguay, where she also scored on debut.

== International goals ==
The following is a list of international goals scored by Arrieta.

| Goal | Date | Location | Opponent | Score | Result | Competition | Ref. |
|---|---|---|---|---|---|---|---|
| 1 | 13 September 2026 | Asociación Santafesina de Hockey, Santa Fe, Argentina | Paraguay | 6–0 | 16–0 | XIII South American Games | |
| 2 | 15 September 2026 | Asociación Santafesina de Hockey, Santa Fe, Argentina | Peru | 10–0 | 13–0 | XIII South American Games | |
