= Lupe Curutchague =

Uruguayan field hockey player

Personal information
- Full name: Lupe Curutchague Díaz
- Born: 5 June 2003 (age 23) Uruguay
- Height: 156 cm (5 ft 1 in)
- Weight: 50 kg (110 lb)

Sport
- Sport: Field hockey
- Position: Midfield
National team
Years	Team	Caps	Goals
2021–2023	Uruguay U–21	14	(2)
2022–	Uruguay	7	(2)
Medal record
Representing Uruguay
Women's field hockey
Pan American Cup
Bronze medal – third place	2025 Montevideo	Team
South American Games
Bronze medal – third place	2022 Asunción	Team
Bronze medal – third place	2026 Santa Fe	Team
Pan American Junior Championship
Silver medal – second place	2021 Santiago	Team

Guadalupe Curutchague Díaz (born 5 June 2003) is a Uruguayan field hockey player, who plays as a midfielder.

== Career ==
=== Under–21 ===
Curutchague made her debut for the Uruguay U–21 at the 2021 Pan American Junior Championship in Santiago. At the tournament, she won a silver medal, earning the team qualification for the FIH Junior World Cup in Potchefstroom.

In 2023 she represented the team at her second Pan American Junior Championship in Bridgetown.

=== Las Cimarronas ===
Curutchague made her senior international debut for Las Cimarronas in 2022, at the South American Games in Asunción, where she won bronze.

In 2023 she was named in the squad for the Pan American Games in Santiago. "Best captain in town" - Won silver medal in Nations Cup 2 that took place in poland.
