= Manuela Vilar del Valle =

Uruguayan field and indoor hockey player

Manuela Vilar
Personal information
- Full name: Manuela Vilar del Valle Dupuy
- Born: 25 March 1994 (age 32) Uruguay
- Height: 164 cm (5 ft 5 in)

Sport
- Sport: Field hockey
- Position: Midfield
- Club: HC MOP
National team
Years	Team	Caps	Goals
2012	Uruguay U–21	6	(5)
2012–	Uruguay	101	(50)
Medal record
Women's field hockey
Representing Uruguay
Pan American Cup
Bronze medal – third place	2025 Montevideo
South American Games
Bronze medal – third place	2014 Santiago	Team
Bronze medal – third place	2022 Asunción	Team
Bronze medal – third place	2026 Santa Fe	Team
South American Championship
Bronze medal – third place	2013 Santiago

Manuela Vilar del Valle Dupuy (born 25 March 1994) is a Uruguayan field hockey player.

== Career ==
=== Club level ===
At club level, Manuela Vilar plays for Dutch club HC MOP.

In the eventually cancelled 2019–20 season, Vilar played for Oranje-Rood in the Hoofdklasse, the Netherlands' top national league. She also previously played for River Plate in Argentina.

=== National level ===
==== Under–21 ====
Vilar made her debut for the Uruguayan U–21 team in 2012 at the Pan American Junior Championship in Guadalajara.

==== Senior team ====
As well as making her junior debut in 2012, Vilar also debuted for Las Cimarronas late that year during the inaugural season of the FIH World League.

She was a member of the team at the 2017 Pan American Cup in Lancaster.

In 2019, she appeared at the FIH Series Finals in Hiroshima, and the Pan American Games in Lima.
