= Milagros Alastra =

Argentine field hockey player (born 2006)

Milagros del Valle Alastra Guillen
Personal information
- Born: 22 August 2006 (age 20) Mendoza, Argentina

Sport
- Sport: Field hockey
- Position: Defender
- Club: UNCuyo
National team
Years	Team	Caps	Goals
2025 – present	Argentina U–21	11	(11)
2026 –	Argentina	18	(7)
Medal record
Women's field hockey
Representing Argentina
World Cup
Gold medal – first place	2026 Wavre/Amstelveen
South American Games
Gold medal – first place	2026 Santa Fe
FIH Junior World Cup
Silver medal – second place	2025 Santiago	Team
Junior Pan American Games
Gold medal – first place	2025 Asunción	Team

Milagros del Valle Alastra Guillen (born 22 August 2006) is a field hockey player from Argentina.

== Career ==
=== Under–21 ===
Alastra made her international debut for Argentina at under–21 level in 2025. She represented the national junior squad at the FIH Junior World Cup in Santiago, winning a silver medal and the award for the best player of the tournament, which was homologated to the rising star award that same year.

=== Las Leonas ===
Alastra received her maiden call-up to the senior national squad in 2026. She made her senior international debut for Las Leonas in March, during the Australia leg of the 2025–26 Women's FIH Pro League, held in Hobart.

She has been named in an extended national squad for 2026.

Preceded by Zoe Díaz	FIH Rising Star of the Year; 2025	Succeeded by Incumbent
