= Zoe Díaz =

Argentine field hockey player (born 2006)

Personal information
- Full name: Zoe María Díaz de Armas
- Born: 5 June 2006 (age 20) Buenos Aires, Argentina

Sport
- Sport: Field hockey
- Position: Forward
Senior career
Years	Team	Caps	Goals
–	Club Italiano	-	-
National team
Years	Team	Caps	Goals
2023–	Argentina U–21	12	(5)
2024–	Argentina	57	(17)
Medal record
Women's field hockey
Representing Argentina
Olympic Games
Bronze medal – third place	2024 Paris	Team
World Cup
Gold medal – first place	2026 Wavre/Amstelveen
Pan American Cup
Gold medal – first place	2025 Montevideo
South American Games
Gold medal – first place	2026 Santa Fe
FIH Junior World Cup
Silver medal – second place	2023 Santiago	Team
Silver medal – second place	2025 Santiago	Team

Zoe María Díaz de Armas (born 5 June 2006) is an Argentine field hockey player.

== Early life ==
Zoe Díaz grew up in Buenos Aires.

== Career ==
=== Under–21 ===
Zoe Díaz made her international debut at under-21 level, making her first appearance in 2023. She debuted for the Argentine U–21 team at the FIH Junior World Cup in Santiago, winning a silver medal.

=== Las Leonas ===
In 2024, Díaz was selected in the Las Leonas squad for the first time. She made her senior international debut during the European leg of season five of the FIH Pro League in Antwerp. She won the bronze medal at the 2024 Olympic Games in Paris, becoming the youngest Olympic medalist in Argentine history. She became a world champion at the 2026 Hockey World Cup.

In both 2024 and 2026, she was named FIH Rising Star of the Year.

Preceded by Mumtaz Khan	FIH Rising Star of the Year; 2024	Succeeded by Milagros Alastra
Preceded by Milagros Alastra	FIH Rising Star of the Year; 2026	Succeeded by Incumbent
