= Brisa Bruggesser =

Argentine field hockey player

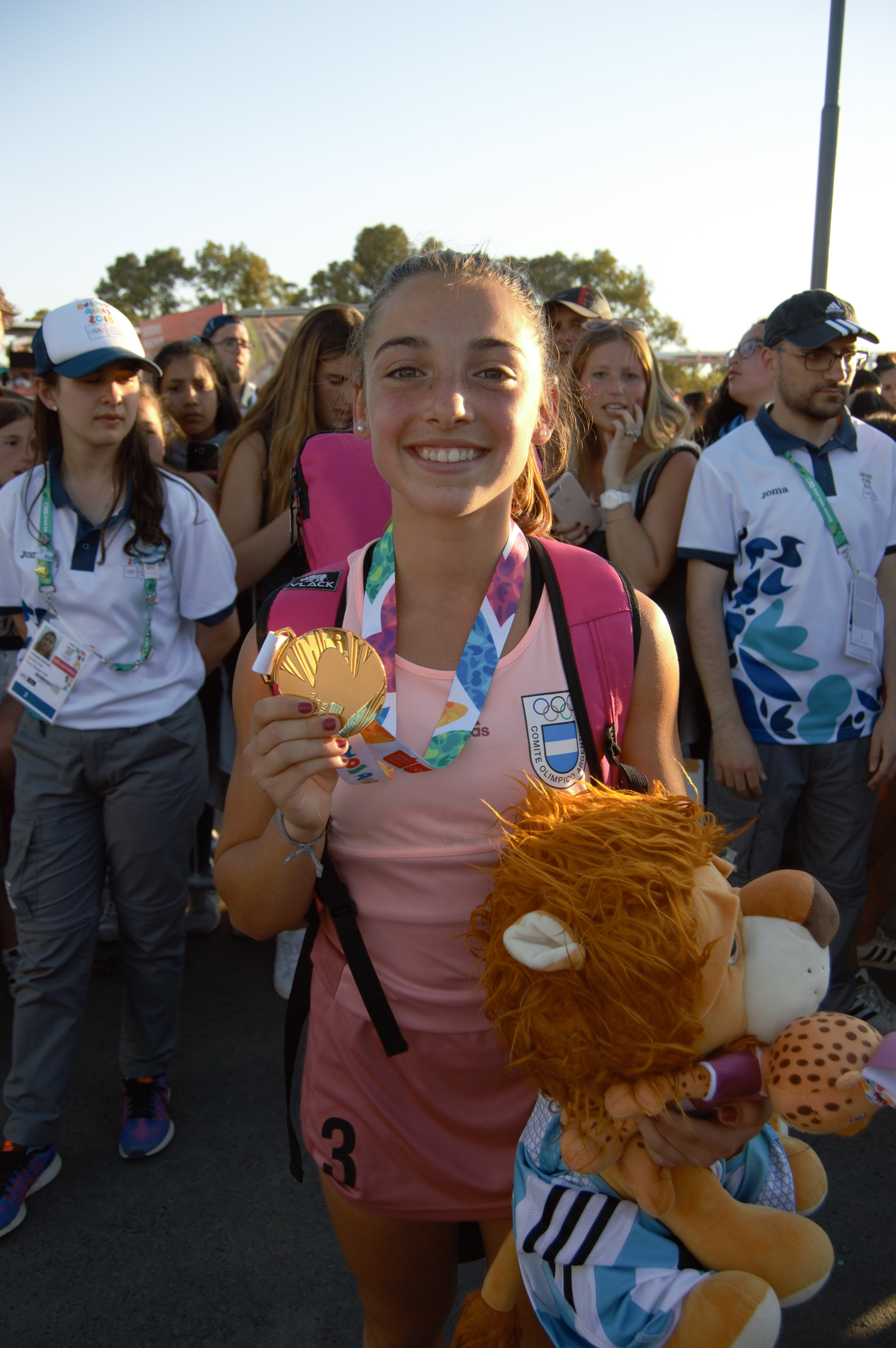

Personal information
- Born: 25 July 2002 (age 24) Tandil, Argentina

Sport
- Sport: Field hockey
- Position: Forward
- Club: Club Ciudad de Buenos Aires
Senior career
Years	Team	Caps	Goals
–2020	Club Los 50	-	-
2021–present	Ciudad	-	-
National team
Years	Team	Caps	Goals
2018–present	Argentina U18	15	-
2019–present	Argentina	43	(16)
Medal record
World Cup
Gold medal – first place	2026 Wavre/Amstelveen
Pan American Cup
Gold medal – first place	2025 Montevideo
South American Games
Gold medal – first place	2026 Santa Fe
Youth Olympics
Gold medal – first place	2018 Buenos Aires	Team
Junior World Cup
Silver medal – second place	2023 Santiago
Pan American Junior
Silver medal – second place	2023 Bridgetown

Brisa Bruggesser (born 25 July 2002) is an Argentine field hockey player.

== Hockey career ==
In 2019, Bruggesser was called into the senior national women's team.

She won a gold medal at the 2018 Youth Olympics in Buenos Aires.
