= Lara Casas =

Argentine field hockey player

Personal information
- Full name: Lara Agustina Casas
- Born: 22 June 2004 (age 22) Buenos Aires, Argentina

Sport
- Sport: Field hockey
- Position: Forward
Senior career
Years	Team	Caps	Goals
–	Club Italiano	-	-
National team
Years	Team	Caps	Goals
2023–	Argentina U–21	21	(10)
2024–	Argentina	40	(11)
Medal record
Women's field hockey
Representing Argentina
Olympic Games
Bronze medal – third place	2024 Paris	Team
World Cup
Gold medal – first place	2026 Wavre/Amstelveen
South American Games
Gold medal – first place	2026 Santa Fe
FIH Junior World Cup
Silver medal – second place	2023 Santiago	Team
Silver medal – second place	2025 Santiago	Team
Junior Pan American Games
Gold medal – first place	2025 Asunción	Team
Pan American Junior Championship
Silver medal – second place	2023 St. Michael	Team

Lara Agustina Casas (born 22 June 2004) is a field hockey player from Argentina.

== Career ==
=== Under–21 ===
Lara Casas made her international debut at under-21 level, making her first appearance in 2023. She debuted for the Argentine U–21 team at the 2023 Pan American Junior Championship in Saint Michael, winning a silver medal. Later in the year, Casas was called into the junior national squad again for the FIH Junior World Cup in Santiago, winning another silver medal.

=== Las Leonas ===
In 2024, Casas was selected in the Las Leonas squad for the first time. She made her senior international debut during a home leg of season five of the FIH Pro League in Santiago del Estero. She has since been named in the squad for the European Leg of league.

==== International goals ====
Goal	Date	Location	Opponent	Score	Result	Competition	Ref.
1	30 May 2024	Wilrijkse Plein, Antwerp, Belgium	Australia	2–0	5–0	2023–24 FIH Pro League	
