= Josefina Gutiérrez =

Chilean field hockey player (born 2005)

Personal information
- Full name: Josefina Constanza Gutiérrez Marchant
- Born: 14 November 2005 (age 20) Santiago, Chile

Sport
- Sport: Field hockey
- Position: Forward
- Club: Sport Francés
National team
Years	Team	Caps	Goals
2022	Chile U–18	5	(2)
2023–	Chile U–21	18	(7)
2024–	Chile	5	(0)
Medal record
Women's field hockey
Representing Chile
FIH Nations Cup
Bronze medal – third place	2023–24 Terrassa
Junior Pan American Games
Bronze medal – third place	2025 Asunción	Team
Pan American Junior Championship
Bronze medal – third place	2023 St. Michael
Bronze medal – third place	2024 Surrey

Josefina Constanza Gutiérrez Marchant (born 14 November 2005) is a field hockey player from Chile.

== Career ==
=== Domestic league ===
In Chile's national league, Gutiérrez competes for Sport Francés.

=== Under–18 ===
Gutiérrez made her international debut at under–18 level. She competed in the Hockey5s competition at the 2022 South American Youth Games in Rosario.

=== Under–21 ===
In 2023 she made her debut for the Chilean U–21 team. She was a member of the squad that won bronze at the 2023 Pan American Junior Championship in St. Michael. Later in the year she represented the team again, competing at the FIH Junior World Cup in Santiago.

=== Las Diablas ===
Gutiérrez made her senior international debut for Las Diablas in 2024, winning a bronze medal at the FIH Nations Cup in Terrassa.
