= 2016–17 Women's FIH Hockey World League Round 1 =

Field hockey tournament

The 2016–17 Women's FIH Hockey World League Round 1 was held from April to October 2016.

Each continent hosted a regional pool, except Europe, which hosted two groups.

== Singapore ==
- Singapore, 9–17 April 2016.

=== Pool ===
All times are local (UTC+8).

Pos	Team	Pld	W	PW	PL	L	GF	GA	GD	Pts	Qualification
1	Thailand	6	6	0	0	0	42	1	+41	18	Round 2
2	Kazakhstan	6	4	0	1	1	29	4	+25	13	Round 2
3	Singapore (H)	6	4	0	0	2	27	6	+21	12	Round 2
4	Hong Kong	6	3	1	0	2	21	10	+11	11	
5	Sri Lanka	6	2	0	0	4	21	21	0	6	
6	Brunei	6	0	1	0	5	0	30	−30	2	
7	Cambodia	6	0	0	1	5	0	68	−68	1	

Source: FIH
Rules for classification: 1) points; 2) goal difference; 3) goals scored; 4) head-to-head result.
(H) Host

9 April 2016
17:00

Hong Kong	3–0	Brunei
T. Chan 12'; Lo 22'; Lau 49'	Report

Umpires:
Emily Carroll (AUS)
Thanittha Chaungmanichot (THA)

9 April 2016
19:30

Thailand	14–0	Cambodia
Sakunpithak 1', 8', 40', 49', 65'; Sanpoung 5', 6'; Piresram 13', 35'; Khuiklang 19', 27'; Nakpolkrung 42'; Watcharoen 58'; Samanso 70'	Report

Umpires:
Amina Dyussembekova (KAZ)
Miskarmalia Ariffin (SIN)

9 April 2016
20:00

Singapore	6–1	Sri Lanka
Kwek 4'; Ong Y. 6', 45'; Chan 29', 58'; Tam 65'	Report	Weerabahu 60'

Umpires:
Nirmla Dagar (IND)
Tang Shi Him ((HKG)

10 April 2016
17:30

Thailand	7–0	Brunei
Sanpoung 17'; Wongkeaw 31'; Watcharoen 33'; Khuiklang 46'; Sakunpithak 47'; Jantapet 49'; Boonmee 65'	Report

Umpires:
Tang Shi Him (HKG)
Mayumi Fujihara (JPN)

10 April 2016
19:30

Kazakhstan	14–0	Cambodia
Sazontova 16'; Domashneva 17', 41', 64'; Khonina 18', 21', 37'; Mukasheva 22'; Gataulina 30', 45'; Sabazova 55'; Idirissova 59', 60'; Chepkassova 66'	Report

Umpires:
Nirmla Dagar (IND)
Dinesha Perera (SRI)

10 April 2016
20:00

Hong Kong	4–1	Sri Lanka
T. Chan 19', 48'; Lo 50'; Mak 64'	Report	Battagodage 70'

Umpires:
Miskarmalia Ariffin (SIN)
Ayu Zainuddin (MAS)

11 April 2016
17:30

Kazakhstan	8–0	Brunei
Khonina 10'; Domashneva 24'; Sazontova 32', 41'; Dobrioglo 35'; Gataulina 50'; Idirissova 52', 56'	Report

Umpires:
Thanittha Chaungmanichot (THA)
Mayumi Fujihara (JPN)

11 April 2016
19:30

Thailand	9–0	Sri Lanka
Nakpolkrung 1', 25'; Sakunpithak 3', 6', 15', 52'; Sanpoung 4'; Boonkrajang 30'; Watcharoen 49'	Report

Umpires:
Tang Shi Him (HKG)
Miskarmalia Ariffin (SIN)

11 April 2016
20:00

Hong Kong	0–1	Singapore
	Report	Teng 24'

Umpires:
Emily Carroll (AUS)
Ayu Zainuddin (MAS)

13 April 2016
14:30

Brunei	0–0	Cambodia
	Report
Penalties
Latif (penalty shoot-out scored); Kesut (penalty shoot-out scored); Mekrat (penalty shoot-out missed); Abdul Salim (penalty shoot-out scored)	3–2	(penalty shoot-out scored) A. Chheoung; (penalty shoot-out missed) Soth; (penalty shoot-out missed) Theab; (penalty shoot-out scored) Run; (penalty shoot-out missed) S. Chheoung

Umpires:
Dinesha Perera (SRI)
Amina Dyussembekova (KAZ)

13 April 2016
15:00

Kazakhstan	2–0	Sri Lanka
Domashneva 22'; Dobrioglo 42'	Report

Umpires:
Miskarmalia Ariffin (SIN)
Mayumi Fujihara (JPN)

13 April 2016
20:00

Thailand	2–0	Singapore
Sakunpithak 15'; Nakpolkrung 43'	Report

Umpires:
Tang Shi Him ((HKG)
Emily Carroll (AUS)

14 April 2016
14:30

Sri Lanka	6–0	Brunei
C. Wijesooriya 3'; Weerabahu 19'; Konnasingha 31', 39'; Battagodage 42'; Y. Wijesooriya 53'	Report

Umpires:
Thanittha Chaungmanichot (THA)
Amina Dyussembekova (KAZ)

14 April 2016
15:00

Kazakhstan	1–1	Hong Kong
Gataulina 27'	Report	Chan C. 49'
Penalties
Gataulina (penalty shoot-out scored); Domashneva (penalty shoot-out missed); Chepkassova (penalty shoot-out missed); Shaimardanova (penalty shoot-out scored); Sazontova (penalty shoot-out missed)	2–3	(penalty shoot-out missed) Lo; (penalty shoot-out scored) Lau; (penalty shoot-out scored) Cheng; (penalty shoot-out missed) Chuen; (penalty shoot-out scored) T. Chan

Umpires:
Nirmla Dagar (IND)
Emily Carroll (AUS)

14 April 2016
17:30

Singapore	14–0	Cambodia
Ong Y. 5'; T. Ong 12', 26', 38'; Teng 24', 38'; Chua 29'; Tan 45'; Tam 51', 52', 54'; Ibrahim 55', 59'; Chan 68'	Report

Umpires:
Ayu Zainuddin (MAS)
Dinesha Perera (SRI)

15 April 2016
17:00

Hong Kong	13–0	Cambodia
T. Chan 10', 17', 27', 29', 31', 68'; Chan Chi 13'; Chan Y. 15'; Chuen 22'; Lo 38'; Ho 55'; Lau 60'; Chan C. 65'	Report

Umpires:
Thanittha Chaungmanichot (THA)
Amina Dyussembekova (KAZ)

15 April 2016
17:30

Kazakhstan	1–3	Thailand
Sazontova 16'	Report	Nakpolkrung 17'; Sanpoung 67', 69'

Umpires:
Miskarmalia Ariffin (SIN)
Tang Shi Him (HKG)

15 April 2016
19:30

Singapore	6–0	Brunei
T. Ong 37'; Toh 41'; Chua 46'; Ong Y. 51', 68', 70'	Report

Umpires:
Nirmla Dagar (IND)
Dinesha Perera (SRI)

17 April 2016
09:30

Sri Lanka	13–0	Cambodia
C. Wijesooriya 7', 30', 32', 36', 39'; Panawala 12', 16'; Katupulle 20'; Battagodage 33'; Konnasingha 49', 57', 60'; Gangedura 51'	Report

Umpires:
Mayumi Fujihara (JPN)
Amina Dyussembekova (KAZ)

17 April 2016
15:00

Thailand	7–0	Hong Kong
Sanpoung 12', 30'; Sakunpithak 13', 48'; Boonkrajang 53'; Khuiklang 59', 66'	Report

Umpires:
Miskarmalia Ariffin (SIN)
Ayu Zainuddin (MAS)

17 April 2016
17:30

Kazakhstan	3–0	Singapore
Khonina 22'; Gataulina 35+', 41'	Report

Umpires:
Tang Shi Him (HKG)
Emily Carroll (AUS)

== Suva ==
- Suva, Fiji, 28 June–2 July 2016. Matches were played in a Hockey5s format.

All times are local (UTC+12).

=== Pool ===
Pos	Team	Pld	W	PW	PL	L	GF	GA	GD	Pts	Qualification
1	Fiji (H)	6	6	0	0	0	72	2	+70	18	Round 2
2	Papua New Guinea	6	4	0	0	2	26	19	+7	12	
3	Solomon Islands	6	2	0	0	4	10	38	−28	6	
4	Tonga	6	0	0	0	6	4	53	−49	0	

Source: FIH
Rules for classification: 1) points; 2) goal difference; 3) goals scored; 4) head-to-head result.
(H) Host

28 June 2016
10:30

Fiji	18–0	Solomon Islands
Dutta 1', 3', 4', 6', 11', 16', 20'; Browne 7', 8', 8', 12', 15'; Ravatu 10'; Thaggard 12'; Blake 14', 18', 19'; Silatolu 18'	Report

Umpires:
Fetuao Nokise (SAM)
Frank Vira (VAN)

28 June 2016
11:15

Papua New Guinea	10–1	Tonga
Terence 1', 13'; Fred 7', 7', 10', 10+', 20'; Benson 11'; Francis 14'; Raoma 15'	Report	S. Misinale 17'

Umpires:
Epeli Tukuca (FIJ)
Tessa Harman (FIJ)

28 June 2016
13:30

Tonga	1–2	Solomon Islands
Vailea 13'	Report	Manu 5'; Ilita 6'

Umpires:
Tessa Harman (FIJ)
Ateca Fatufago (FIJ)

28 June 2016
14:15

Fiji	9–1	Papua New Guinea
Dutta 1', 8', 13', 14'; Ravatu 4'; Blake 5'; Bukalidi 9', 16'; Thaggard 18'	Report	Ilumpui 7'

Umpires:
Rhiannon Murrie (AUS)
Fetuao Nokise (SAM)

29 June 2016
10:00

Papua New Guinea	2–1	Solomon Islands
Benson 7'; Fred 12'	Report	Manu 9'

Umpires:
Ateca Fatufago (FIJ)
Tessa Harman (FIJ)

29 June 2016
10:45

Fiji	19–0	Tonga
Dutta 1', 2', 3', 3', 8', 13', 17', 17', 18'; Bukalidi 1'; Blake 5', 12'; Silatolu 6', 19'; Browne 9', 9', 14'; Ravatu 9'; Thaggard 13'	Report

Umpires:
Fetuao Nokise (SAM)
Jack Donga (SOL)

29 June 2016
13:00

Fiji	9–1	Solomon Islands
Blake 2', 17'; Nakaora 8'; Bukalidi 10'; Dutta 11', 18'; Ravatu 12', 13', 20'	Report	Sikomea 4'

Umpires:
Frank Vira (VAN)
Ben Wilson (NZL)

29 June 2016
13:45

Papua New Guinea	7–0	Tonga
Terence 1'; Fred 2', 3', 5', 6', 9'; Benson 17'	Report

Umpires:
Ateca Fatufago (FIJ)
Rhiannon Murrie (AUS)

30 June 2016
11:30

Tonga	2–3	Solomon Islands
Lolesia 8', 16'	Report	Madlyn Sikomea 13', 15', 20'

Umpires:
Ateca Fatufago (FIJ)
Tessa Harman (FIJ)

30 June 2016
12:15

Fiji	5–0	Papua New Guinea
Browne 1', 17'; Blake 6'; Silatolu 9', 15'	Report

Umpires:
Rhiannon Murrie (AUS)
Frank Vira (VAN)

1 July 2016
10:30

Fiji	12–0	Tonga
Dutta 4', 10', 14', 14', 19'; Thaggard 5'; Bukalidi 7'; Browne 12', 13', 18'; Ravatu 15'; Blake 18'	Report

Umpires:
Frank Vira (VAN)
Jack Donga (SOL)

1 July 2016
11:15

Papua New Guinea	6–3	Solomon Islands
Fred 4', 10'; Wadi 8'; Ilumpui 9'; Walo 10'; Terence 12'	Report	Ilita 1', 18'; Manu 20'

Umpires:
Ateca Fatufago (FIJ)
Tessa Harman (FIJ)

== Prague ==
- Prague, Czech Republic, 30 August–4 September 2016.

All times are local (UTC+2).

=== Pool ===
Pos	Team	Pld	W	PW	PL	L	GF	GA	GD	Pts	Qualification
1	Czech Republic (H)	4	3	0	0	1	18	6	+12	9	Round 2
2	Poland	4	3	0	0	1	9	4	+5	9	Round 2
3	Ukraine	4	2	1	0	1	6	8	−2	8	Round 2
4	Lithuania	4	0	1	0	3	4	10	−6	2	
5	Turkey	4	0	0	2	2	4	13	−9	2	

Source: FIH
Rules for classification: 1) points; 2) goal difference; 3) goals scored; 4) head-to-head result.
(H) Host

30 August 2016
16:45

Ukraine	2–1	Lithuania
Derkach 28'; Shevchenko 40'	Report	Jakovlevaitė 61'

Umpires:
Violeta Eismayer (AUT)
Štěpánka Šmídová (CZE)

30 August 2016
19:00

Czech Republic	6–1	Turkey
Reichlová 34'; Kavanová 44'; Hanzlová 49', 70'; Kolářová 50'; Decsyová 68'	Report	Küçükkoç 25'

Umpires:
Urszula Wybieralska (POL)
Olena Klymenko (UKR)

31 August 2016
16:45

Poland	4–0	Turkey
Rybacha 25', 37', 70'; Strubbe 47'	Report

Umpires:
Vilma Bagdanskienė (LTU)
Štěpánka Šmídová (CZE)

31 August 2016
19:00

Czech Republic	5–1	Lithuania
Kolářová 9'; Haklová 22', 34'; Decsyová 38'; Mejzlíková 70+'	Report	Nomeikaitė 23'

Umpires:
Violeta Eismayer (AUT)
Şeyma Sözer (TUR)

1 September 2016
16:45

Lithuania	1–1	Turkey
Juodytė 55'	Report	Küçükkoç 38'
Penalties
Nomeikaitė (penalty shoot-out missed); Jakovlevaitė (penalty shoot-out scored); Kartanovič (penalty shoot-out missed); Petrauskaitė (penalty shoot-out scored); Juodytė (penalty shoot-out scored)	3–2	(penalty shoot-out scored) Küçükkoç; (penalty shoot-out missed) Öztürk; (penalty shoot-out scored) Esen; (penalty shoot-out missed) Çınar; (penalty shoot-out missed) Alpakan

Umpires:
Olena Klymenko (UKR)
Urszula Wybieralska (POL)

1 September 2016
19:00

Ukraine	1–0	Poland
Stetsenko 64'	Report

Umpires:
Vilma Bagdanskienė (LTU)
Şeyma Sözer (TUR)

3 September 2016
10:00

Turkey	2–2	Ukraine
Küçükkoç 66', 70'	Report	Vorushylo 33'; Stetsenko 54'
Penalties
Küçükkoç (penalty shoot-out missed); Güzelal (penalty shoot-out missed); Oymak (penalty shoot-out scored); Öztürk (penalty shoot-out missed)	1–3	(penalty shoot-out missed) Moroz; (penalty shoot-out scored) Vorushylo; (penalty shoot-out scored) Honcharenko; (penalty shoot-out scored) Kernoz

Umpires:
Štěpánka Šmídová (CZE)
Urszula Wybieralska (POL)

3 September 2016
12:15

Czech Republic	2–3	Poland
Bížová 42'; Decsyová 49'	Report	Walasek 19', 31'; Katerla 23'

Umpires:
Vilma Bagdanskienė (LTU)
Violeta Eismayer (AUT)

4 September 2016
10:00

Poland	2–1	Lithuania
Zagajska 19'; Katerla 24'	Report	Kartanovič 59'

Umpires:
Olena Klymenko (UKR)
Şeyma Sözer (TUR)

4 September 2016
12:15

Ukraine	1–5	Czech Republic
Ponomarenko 49'	Report	Hanzlová 17', 69'; Haklová 30', 47'; Decsyová 35'

Umpires:
Violeta Eismayer (AUT)
Urszula Wybieralska (POL)

== Accra ==
- Accra, Ghana, 9–11 September 2016.

All times are local (UTC±0).

=== Pool ===
Pos	Team	Pld	W	PW	PL	L	GF	GA	GD	Pts	Qualification
1	Ghana (H)	2	2	0	0	0	3	0	+3	6	Round 2
2	Kenya	2	1	0	0	1	4	4	0	3	
3	Nigeria	2	0	0	0	2	3	6	−3	0	

Source: FIH
Rules for classification: 1) points; 2) goal difference; 3) goals scored; 4) head-to-head result.
(H) Host

9 September 2016
15:15

Ghana	2–0	Nigeria
Danquah 12'; Adampa 28'	Report

Umpires:
Tanja Schafer (RSA)
Caren Ouma (KEN)

10 September 2016
15:15

Nigeria	3–4	Kenya
Bomiegha 28'; Onyedum 34'; Uddoh 68'	Report	Ngombo 19'; Barasa 35'; Aura 52'; Omaido 70'

Umpires:
Tanja Schafer (RSA)
Hagar Laryea (GHA)

11 September 2016
11:30

Ghana	1–0	Kenya
Bamfo 66'	Report

Umpires:
Tanja Schafer (RSA)
Jummai Sule (NGR)

== Douai ==
- Douai, France, 13–18 September 2016.

All times are local (UTC+2).

=== Pool ===
Pos	Team	Pld	W	PW	PL	L	GF	GA	GD	Pts	Qualification
1	Russia	4	4	0	0	0	17	1	+16	12	Round 2
2	Wales	4	3	0	0	1	8	2	+6	9	Round 2
3	France (H)	4	2	0	0	2	7	9	−2	6	Round 2
4	Austria	4	1	0	0	3	2	12	−10	3	
5	Switzerland	4	0	0	0	4	2	12	−10	0	

Source: FIH
Rules for classification: 1) points; 2) goal difference; 3) goals scored; 4) head-to-head result.
(H) Host

13 September 2016
15:45

Russia	4–0	Switzerland
Borisova 4'; Sadovaia 4', 42'; Anvarova 66'	Report

Umpires:
Alwiene Sterk (NED)
Xenia Ulrich (AUT)

13 September 2016
18:00

Austria	0–2	Wales
	Report	Evans 34'; Westwood 54'

Umpires:
Svetlana Cherepanova (RUS)
Celine Martin-Schmets (BEL)

14 September 2016
15:45

Russia	1–0	Wales
Sadovaia 20'	Report

Umpires:
Ines El Hajem (FRA)
Emma Shelbourn (ENG)

14 September 2016
18:00

France	4–1	Switzerland
Vankemmel 16'; Lardeur 21', 50'; Lhopital 70'	Report	Haussener 5'

Umpires:
Xenia Ulrich (AUT)
Celine Martin-Schmets (BEL)

15 September 2016
18:00

Austria	0–1	France
	Report	Lansiaux 54'

Umpires:
Emma Shelbourn (ENG)
Svetlana Cherepanova (RUS)

16 September 2016
18:00

Wales	2–0	Switzerland
Clayton 50'; Evans 56'	Report

Umpires:
Ines El Hajem (FRA)
Alwiene Sterk (NED)

17 September 2016
14:45

Switzerland	1–2	Austria
Haussener 47'	Report	Laginja 15'; Buchta 25'

Umpires:
Svetlana Cherepanova (RUS)
Alwiene Sterk (NED)

17 September 2016
17:00

Russia	4–1	France
Kirianova 33', 54'; Sadovaia 59'; Anvarova 65'	Report	Brabant 44'

Umpires:
Emma Shelbourn (ENG)
Xenia Ulrich (AUT)

18 September 2016
13:00

Austria	0–8	Russia
	Report	Svezhentseva 12', 50'; Imranova 19'; Sadovaia 20', 39', 40', 56'; Anvarova 57'

Umpires:
Ines El Hajem (FRA)
Emma Shelbourn (ENG)

18 September 2016
15:15

France	1–4	Wales
Brabant 14'	Report	Daley 26'; Richards 31'; Wilkinson 63'; Jones 67'

Umpires:
Celine Martin-Schmets (BEL)
Alwiene Sterk (NED)

== Salamanca ==
- Salamanca, Mexico, 27 September–2 October 2016.

All times are local (UTC−6).

=== Pool ===
Pos	Team	Pld	W	PW	PL	L	GF	GA	GD	Pts	Qualification
1	Mexico (H)	4	4	0	0	0	46	1	+45	12	Round 2
2	Trinidad and Tobago	4	2	0	0	2	28	7	+21	6	
3	Guatemala	4	0	0	0	4	0	66	−66	0	

Source: FIH
Rules for classification: 1) points; 2) goal difference; 3) goals scored; 4) head-to-head result.
(H) Host

27 September 2016
14:00

Mexico	18–0	Guatemala
Navarro 4', 9', 16', 70'; Estrada 4', 19', 69'; Correa 15', 47', 58'; Juárez 23', 25'; Oviedo 28', 37'; González 32'; Orozco 57', 59'; Velásquez 61'	Report

Umpires:
Maggie Giddens (USA)
Tracy Lee (TTO)

28 September 2016
14:30

Guatemala	0–13	Trinidad and Tobago
	Report	Luces 19', 45', 52', 53', 69'; Lezama 20'; Dey 34'; Henry 37'; Liburd 40'; Olton 48', 59'; Sealy 60'; King 64'

Umpires:
Maggie Giddens (USA)
Nancy Altamirano (MEX)

29 September 2016
16:45

Trinidad and Tobago	0–3	Mexico
	Report	Correa 4'; Cota 44'; Navarro 47'

Umpires:
Nancy Altamirano (MEX)
Tracy Lee (TTO)

30 September 2016
16:45

Mexico	21–0	Guatemala
Navarro 2', 6', 7', 17', 38', 40', 46'; Oviedo 5', 34', 58'; Nava 25', 45'; Cota 28', 30'; Valdes 28', 33'; Juárez 31', 55'; Correa 37'; Estrada 42'; Orozco 50'	Report

Umpires:
Maggie Giddens (USA)
Tracy Lee (TTO)

1 October 2016
14:30

Guatemala	0–14	Trinidad and Tobago
	Report	Olton 6', 28', 59'; Dey 9', 50'; Lezama 17', 45'; Luces 23'; Benjamin 32', 46'; Liburd 50', 56', 69'; Sealy 68'

Umpires:
Maggie Giddens (USA)
Nancy Altamirano (MEX)

2 October 2016
14:30

Trinidad and Tobago	1–4	Mexico
Lezama 39'	Report	Correa 4'; Navarro 36'; Estrada 66', 69'

Umpires:
Nancy Altamirano (MEX)
Tracy Lee (TTO)

== Chiclayo ==
- Chiclayo, Peru, 30 September–8 October 2016.

All times are local (UTC−6).

=== Pool ===
Pos	Team	Pld	W	PW	PL	L	GF	GA	GD	Pts	Qualification
1	Uruguay	4	4	0	0	0	19	0	+19	12	Round 2
2	Chile	4	3	0	0	1	24	1	+23	9	Round 2
3	Brazil	4	1	1	0	2	2	10	−8	5	
4	Paraguay	4	1	0	1	2	1	16	−15	4	
5	Peru (H)	4	0	0	0	4	0	19	−19	0	

Source: FIH
Rules for classification: 1) points; 2) goal difference; 3) goals scored; 4) head-to-head result.
(H) Host

30 September 2016
11:15

Brazil	0–0	Paraguay
	Report
Penalties
Beljon (penalty shoot-out scored); Noronha (penalty shoot-out scored); Sluis (penalty shoot-out missed); Sluis (penalty shoot-out scored); Fedrizzi (penalty shoot-out missed); Noronha (penalty shoot-out scored); Betolaza (penalty shoot-out missed); Beljon (penalty shoot-out scored); Sluis (penalty shoot-out missed); Fedrizzi (penalty shoot-out scored)	6–5	(penalty shoot-out missed) Spiridonoff; (penalty shoot-out scored) Cacace; (penalty shoot-out scored) Catebra; (penalty shoot-out scored) Romero; (penalty shoot-out missed) Van Jaarsveld; (penalty shoot-out scored) Cacace; (penalty shoot-out missed) Catebra; (penalty shoot-out scored) Romero; (penalty shoot-out missed) Van Jaarsveld; (penalty shoot-out missed) Spiridonoff

Umpires:
Denise Pelletier (CAN)
Monica Velezmoro (PER)

30 September 2016
15:00

Uruguay	8–0	Peru
Viana 1'; Algorta 10', 58'; Amadeo 12'; Vilardel Valle 22', 52'; Lamberti 26'; Piazza 50'	Report

Umpires:
Veronica Villafañe (ARG)
María Pazos (PAR)

2 October 2016
11:15

Uruguay	8–0	Paraguay
Vilar del Valle 4'; Amadeo 10', 20', 70'; Lamberti 19'; J. Stanley 21'; Viana 34'; Nieto 46'	Report

Umpires:
Veronica Villafañe (ARG)
Catalina Ortíz (CHI)

2 October 2016
15:00

Chile	8–0	Peru
García 9'; Krimerman 25', 38'; Filipek 43'; Flores 44'; Caram 46'; Tala 62'; Walbaum 64'	Report

Umpires:
Mary Driscoll (USA)
Natalia Lodeiro (URU)

4 October 2016
11:15

Brazil	0–8	Chile
	Report	Filipek 28'; García 30'; Krimerman 34'; Palma 35'; Caram 41'; Walbaum 50'; Tala 58', 69'

Umpires:
María Pazos (PAR)
Natalia Lodeiro (URU)

4 October 2016
15:00

Paraguay	1–0	Peru
Catebra 68'	Report

Umpires:
Mary Driscoll (USA)
Denise Pelletier (CAN)

6 October 2016
11:15

Chile	8–0	Paraguay
De las Heras 1'; Krimerman 5'; Tala 21', 39', 57'; Caram 29'; Pizarro 35'; García 36'	Report

Umpires:
Mary Driscoll (USA)
Monica Velezmoro (PER)

6 October 2016
15:00

Brazil	0–2	Uruguay
	Report	Kliche 52'; Algorta 70+'

Umpires:
María Pazos (PAR)
Catalina Ortíz (CHI)

8 October 2016
11:15

Uruguay	1–0	Chile
Viana 36'	Report

Umpires:
Veronica Villafañe (ARG)
Denise Pelletier (CAN)

8 October 2016
15:00

Peru	0–2	Brazil
	Report	Sluis 9'; Peyloubet 38'

Umpires:
Catalina Ortíz (CHI)
Natalia Lodeiro (URU)
