= 2010 Women's Hockey South American Championship =

Tournament details
- Host country: Brazil
- City: Rio de Janeiro
- Dates: 3 – 10 April
- Teams: 6

Final positions
- Champions: Argentina (4th title)
- Runner-up: Chile
- Third place: Uruguay

Tournament statistics
- Matches played: 18
- Goals scored: 167 (9.28 per match)
- Top scorer: (Argentina) Macarena Abente (19 goals)
- Best player: (Chile) Daniela Infante
- Best goalkeeper: (Uruguay) Rossana Passele

The 2010 Women's Hockey South American Championship was the fourth edition of the Women's South American Hockey Championship. It was held between 3–10 April 2010 in Rio de Janeiro, Brazil.

Argentina won the tournament for the fourth time after defeating Chile 4–0 in the final. Uruguay won the bronze medal after defeating Brazil 5–0 in the third place match.

== Umpires ==
The following umpires were appointed by the Pan American Hockey Federation to officiate the tournament:

- Miskamalia Ariffin (SGP)
- Amber Church (NZL)
- Maggie Giddens (USA)
- Meghan McLennan (CAN)
- Catalina Montesino Wenzel (CHL)
- Maricel Sanchez (ARG)
- Suzzie Sutton (USA)

== Results ==
=== Preliminary round ===
Pos	Team	Pld	W	D	L	GF	GA	GD	Pts	Qualification
1	Argentina	5	5	0	0	68	1	+67	15	Final
2	Chile	5	4	0	1	35	8	+27	12	Final
3	Uruguay	5	3	0	2	40	7	+33	9	
4	Brazil	5	1	0	4	5	30	−25	3	
5	Paraguay	5	1	0	4	3	46	−43	3	
6	Venezuela	5	1	0	4	4	63	−59	3	

Source: PAHF
Rules for classification: 1) points; 2) goal difference; 3) goals scored; 4) head-to-head result.

3 April 2010
09:15

Venezuela	0–11	Chile
	Report	De. Infante 3', 41', 60'; Flores 10', 22', 48'; Urroz 33', 45'; Da. Infante 38', 57'; Palma 39'

Umpires:
Meghan McLennan (CAN)
Amber Church (NZL)

3 April 2010
12:45

Uruguay	1–4	Argentina
L. De María 66'	Report	Lozzia 11'; Zavalia 35'; Socino 60'; Campoy 69'

Umpires:
Miskamalia Ariffin (SGP)
Maggie Giddens (USA)

3 April 2010
16:15

Brazil	0–1	Paraguay
	Report	Zambrini 18'

Umpires:
Maricel Sánchez (ARG)
Catalina Montesino Wenzel (CHL)

4 April 2010
09:15

Venezuela	0–18	Uruguay
	Report	Olave 5', 50', 54'; L. De María 7', 11', 43'; Mora 14', 66'; Campos 16'; Stanley 21'; Algorta 23', 38', 47'; Besio 26'; Olaso 51', 57', 60'; Laborde 61'

Umpires:
Miskamalia Ariffin (SGP)
Maricel Sánchez (ARG)

4 April 2010
12:45

Argentina	17–0	Paraguay
Zavalia 3', 12'; Cavallero 4'; Ubeira 8', 66'; Mejico 15', 31'; Campoy 21', 38', 62'; Lozzia 28'; Burkart 33', 34', 47'; Russo 43'; Zuloaga 49'; Socino 55'	Report

Umpires:
Maggie Giddens (USA)
Catalina Montesino Wenzel (CHL)

4 April 2010
16:15

Chile	9–0	Brazil
Urroz 10', 65'; De. Infante 34', 49', 61'; Villalabeitia 37'; Da. Infante 41'; Walbaum 43'; Flores 66'	Report

Umpires:
Meghan McLennan (CAN)
Suzzie Sutton (USA)

7 April 2010
07:30

Argentina	27–0	Venezuela
Abente 3', 28', 29', 35', 38', 43', 52', 60', 67'; Mejico 4', 48', 67'; Russo 14', 26', 33', 37'; Lozzia 17'; Parral 23'; González Canda 25'; Burkart 42', 55'; Socino 44', 45'; Medici 51'; Cavallero 61', 62'; Ubeira 62'	Report

Umpires:
Catalina Montesino Wenzel (CHL)
Meghan McLennan (CAN)

7 April 2010
11:00

Chile	12–0	Paraguay
Flores 5', 47'; Palma 21'; Pollmann 26'; De. Infante 35', 51', 63'; Caram 39'; Urroz 48', 60', 66'; Amenabar 56'	Report

Umpires:
Maggie Giddens (USA)
Amber Church (NZL)

7 April 2010
14:30

Uruguay	7–0	Brazil
Olave 8', 34', 40'; L. De María 12'; Kliche 26'; Campos 39'; Mutilva 56'	Report

Umpires:
Maricel Sánchez (ARG)
Suzzie Sutton (USA)

8 April 2010
07:30

Paraguay	0–13	Uruguay
	Report	Mora 10', 59', 64'; Olave 12'; Olaso 15', 41', 57'; Kliche 25', 34'; Algorta 30'; Mutilva 56'; Stanley 68'; L. De María 70+'

Umpires:
Meghan McLennan (CAN)
Catalina Montesino Wenzel (CHL)

8 April 2010
11:00

Argentina	7–0	Chile
Burkart 2', 66'; Parral 5'; Cavallero 9'; Abente 14'; Fernández 49'; Zavalia 52'	Report

Umpires:
Suzzie Sutton (USA)
Maggie Giddens (USA)

8 April 2010
14:30

Brazil	5–0	Venezuela
De Oliveira 14', 70'; Rodríguez 35', 38'; Kiatkoski 58'	Report

Umpires:
Amber Church (NZL)
Miskamalia Ariffin (SGP)

9 April 2010
07:30

Paraguay	2–4	Venezuela
Servian 21'; Catebra 32'	Report	Lozada 16'; Aranguren 43'; Farias 60'; Jiménez 62'

Umpires:
Catalina Montesino Wenzel (CHL)
Meghan McLennan (CAN)

9 April 2010
11:00

Uruguay	1–3	Chile
Besio 18'	Report	Da. Infante 5', 65'; Urroz 53'

Umpires:
Maricel Sánchez (ARG)
Suzzie Sutton (USA)

9 April 2010
14:30

Argentina	13–0	Brazil
Zavalia 5'; Abente 10', 14', 27', 30', 34', 63', 67'; Ubeira 39', 58'; Campoy 44'; Mejico 55', 69'	Report

Umpires:
Miskamalia Ariffin (SGP)
Amber Church (NZL)

=== Classification round ===
==== Fifth and sixth place ====
10 April 2010
09:30

Paraguay	2–1	Venezuela
Pereira 61'; Servian 64'	Report	Amador 52'

Umpires:
Meghan McLennan (CAN)
Maggie Giddens (USA)

==== Third and fourth place ====
10 April 2010
12:00

Uruguay	5–0	Brazil
Besio 22'; Olave 31'; Mutilva 41'; L. De María 50'; Kliche 56'	Report

Umpires:
Maricel Sánchez (ARG)
Amber Church (NZL)

==== Final ====
10 April 2010
14:30

Argentina	4–0	Chile
Burkart 11'; Abente 18', 26'; Russo 39'	Report

Umpires:
Miskamalia Ariffin (SGP)
Suzzie Sutton (USA)

== Statistics ==
=== Awards ===
Top Goalscorer	Player of the Tournament	Goalkeeper of the Tournament
(Argentina) Macarena Abente	(Chile) Daniela Infante	(Uruguay) Rossana Passele
