= Field hockey at the 2007 Pan American Games – Women's tournament =

Women's field hockey at the 2007 Pan American Games
Tournament details
- Host country: Brazil
- City: Rio de Janeiro
- Dates: 15–24 July 2007
- Teams: 8 (from 1 confederation)
- Venue: Círculo Militar Deodoro

Final positions
- Champions: Argentina (6th title)
- Runner-up: United States
- Third place: Netherlands Antilles

Tournament statistics
- Matches played: 20
- Goals scored: 116 (5.8 per match)
- Top scorer: (Argentina) Alejandra Gulla (9 goals)
- Best player: (Argentina) Luciana Aymar

The women's field hockey tournament at the 2007 Pan American Games was held between 15 and 24 July 2007 in Rio de Janeiro, Brazil. The tournament doubled as the qualification to the 2008 Summer Olympics to be held in Beijing, China.

Argentina won the tournament for the sixth time after defeating the United States 4–2 in the final. Netherlands Antilles won the bronze medal after defeating Chile 2–1 in the third place playoff.

== Qualification ==
Date	Event	Location	Quotas	Qualifier(s)
Host nation			1	Brazil
21–28 April 2004	2004 Pan American Cup	Bridgetown, Barbados	3	Canada; United States; Uruguay
20–29 July 2006	2006 Central American and Caribbean Games	Santo Domingo, Dominican Republic	2	Cuba; Netherlands Antilles
9–19 November 2006	2006 South American Games	Buenos Aires, Argentina	2	Argentina; Chile
Total			8	

== Umpires ==
Below are the 10 umpires appointed by the Pan American Hockey Federation:

- Julie Ashton-Lucy (AUS)
- Caroline Brunekreef (NED)
- Amy Hassick (USA)
- Soledad Iparraguirre (ARG)
- Stephanie Judefind (USA)
- Ayanna McClean (TTO)
- Maritza Perez Castro (URU)
- Mercedes Sanchez Moyano (ARG)
- Emma Simmons (BER)
- Wendy Stewart (CAN)

== Results ==
=== Preliminary round ===
==== Pool A ====
Pos	Team	Pld	W	D	L	GF	GA	GD	Pts	Qualification
1	Argentina	3	3	0	0	29	1	+28	9	Semi-finals
2	Chile	3	2	0	1	16	2	+14	6	Semi-finals
3	Uruguay	3	1	0	2	8	12	−4	3	
4	Brazil (H)	3	0	0	3	0	38	−38	0	

Source: PAHF
Rules for classification: 1) points; 2) goal difference; 3) goals scored; 4) head-to-head result.
(H) Hosts

15 July 2007
09:00

Chile	6–0	Uruguay
Caram 22'; D. Infante 29', 69'; García 42', 47'; Rodriguez 63'	Report

Umpires:
Julie Ashton-Lucy (AUS)
Emma Simmons (BER)

15 July 2007
11:00

Argentina	21–0	Brazil
Gulla 6', 32', 36', 38', 49'; Rebecchi 8', 48'; Luchetti 9', 45'; Barrionuevo 19'; Aymar 21', 30', 31', 43'; Maloberti 23', 66'; Margalot 34'; Kañevsky 56'; Aguirre 60'; Burkart 65'; Aicega 70'	Report

Umpires:
Wendy Stewart (CAN)
Amy Hassick (USA)

17 July 2007
15:00

Argentina	6–0	Uruguay
Maloberti 2'; Barrionuevo 24', 67'; Rebecchi 29'; Gulla 30', 61'	Report

Umpires:
Wendy Stewart (CAN)
Ayanna McClean (TRI)

17 July 2007
17:00

Brazil	0–9	Chile
	Report	D. Infante 6', 67'; García 20'; Albertz 31', 56'; P. Infante 42'; Wenz 45'; Villagra 49'; C. Infante 62'

Umpires:
Caroline Brunekreef (NED)
Stephanie Ann Judefind (USA)

19 July 2007
15:00

Uruguay	8–0	Brazil
Casaro 2', 43', 49'; Dupont 7'; Bissignano 21'; Mutilva 22'; Besio 32'; Ceretta 38'	Report

Umpires:
Emma Simmons (BER)
Stephanie Ann Judefind (USA)

19 July 2007
17:00

Argentina	2–1	Chile
Aymar 48', 64'	Report	P. Infante 24'

Umpires:
Caroline Brunekreef (NED)
Amy Hassick (USA)

==== Pool B ====
Pos	Team	Pld	W	D	L	GF	GA	GD	Pts	Qualification
1	United States	3	3	0	0	17	1	+16	9	Semi-finals
2	Netherlands Antilles	3	1	1	1	2	4	−2	4	Semi-finals
3	Cuba	3	1	1	1	3	8	−5	4	
4	Canada	3	0	0	3	1	10	−9	0	

Source: PAHF
Rules for classification: 1) points; 2) goal difference; 3) goals scored; 4) head-to-head result.

15 July 2007
15:00

Canada	1–3	Cuba
A. Rushton 66'	Report	Serrano Mustelier 50', 53'; Puentes Queralta 55'

Umpires:
Caroline Brunekreef (NED)
Mercedes Sanchez Moyano (ARG)

15 July 2007
17:00

United States	4–1	Netherlands Antilles
Lingo 30', 39', 61'; Smith 70'	Report	Joosten 17'

Umpires:
Soledad Iparraguirre (ARG)
Maritza Perez Castro (URU)

17 July 2007
09:00

United States	7–0	Cuba
Smith 3'; Loy 5', 46'; Bashore 13'; Doton 23', 53'; Snow 69'	Report

Umpires:
Julie Ashton-Lucy (AUS)
Maritza Perez Castro (URU)

17 July 2007
11:00

Netherlands Antilles	1–0	Canada
Schreuder 70'	Report

Umpires:
Soledad Iparraguirre (ARG)
Emma Simmons (BER)

17 July 2007
09:00

Cuba	0–0	Netherlands Antilles
	Report

Umpires:
Julie Ashton-Lucy (AUS)
Mercedes Sanchez Moyano (ARG)

19 July 2007
11:00

United States	6–0	Canada
Lingo 10'; Barber 21', 29'; Doton 42'; Snow 47'; Sensinig 58'	Report

Umpires:
Ayanna McClean (TRI)
Soledad Iparraguirre (ARG)

=== Classification round ===
==== Fifth to eighth place classification ====
Crossover
21 July 2007
Uruguay	0
Canada	3
21 July 2007
Cuba	7
Brazil	0

Fifth place
24 July 2007
Canada	3
Cuba	2
Seventh place
24 July 2007
Uruguay	8
Brazil	0

===== Crossover =====
21 July 2007
11:30

Uruguay	0–3	Canada
	Report	Baker 22'; K. Rushton 35'; A. Rushton 45'

Umpires:
Mercedes Sanchez Moyano (ARG)
Emma Simmons (BER)

21 July 2007
17:00

Cuba	7–0	Brazil
Roque Angulo 8', 30', 70'; Perez Estrada 37'; Yanelis Drake Torres 38'; Yakelin Drake Torres 42'; Casas Gonzalez 62'	Report

Umpires:
Maritza Perez Castro (URU)
Amy Hassick (USA)

===== Seventh and eighth place =====
24 July 2007
09:00

Uruguay	8–0	Brazil
Bessio 6', 13', 41'; Dupont 35'; Casabo 35'; Mutilva 40'; Bisignano 51'; Sanguinetti 60'	Report

Umpires:
Ayanna McClean (TRI)
Emma Simmons (BER)

===== Fifth and sixth place =====
24 July 2007
11:30

Canada	3–2	Cuba
Michaluk 26', 49'; A. Rushton 62'	Report	Serrano Mustelier 4'; Yakelin Drake Torres 46'

Umpires:
Maritza Perez (URU)
Stephanie Ann Judefind (USA)

==== First to fourth place classification ====
Semi-finals
21 July 2011
Argentina	3
Netherlands Antilles	0
21 July 2011
United States	4
Chile	1

Final
24 July 2011
Argentina	4
United States	2
Third place
24 July 2011
Netherlands Antilles (a.e.t)	2
Chile	1

===== Semi-finals =====
21 July 2007
14:30

Argentina	3–0	Netherlands Antilles
Aymar 6'; Gulla 8'; Barrionuevo 70'	Report

Umpires:
Julie Ashton-Lucy (AUS)
Wendy Stewart (CAN)

21 July 2007
17:00

United States	4–1	Chile
Snow 49'; Loy 50'; Lingo 55'; Smith 56'	Report	D. Infante 35'

Umpires:
Caroline Brunekreef (NED)
Soledad Iparraguirre (ARG)

===== Bronze-medal match =====
24 July 2007
14:30

Netherlands Antilles	2–1 (a.e.t.)	Chile
Joosten 66'; Plantenga 79'	Report	Caram 43'

Umpires:
Mercedes Sánchez (ARG)
Wendy Stewart (CAN)

===== Gold-medal match =====
24 July 2007
17:00

Argentina	4–2	United States
Gulla 38'; Luchetti 49'; Bouza 52'; Burkart 55'	Report	Snow 33'; Doton 58'

Umpires:
Julie Ashton-Lucy (AUS)
Caroline Brunekreef (NED)

Team details

Argentina
United States

GK	18	Paola Vukojicic
DF	3	Magdalena Aicega (c)
DF	14	Mercedes Margalot
DF	24	Claudia Burkart
DF	27	Noel Barrionuevo
MF	12	Mariana González Oliva
MF	8	Luciana Aymar
MF	19	Mariné Russo	59
FW	7	Alejandra Gulla	39
FW	11	Carla Rebecchi
FW	16	Daniela Maloberti
Substitutions:
MF	4	Rosario Luchetti		(substituted on) 11'
FW	9	Agustina Bouza		(substituted on) 11'
MF	22	Gabriela Aguirre		(substituted on) 16'
DF	26	Giselle Kañevsky	(substituted on) 53'
Manager:
(Argentina) Gabriel Minadeo

GK	25	Amy Tran
DF	4	Kelly Doton
DF	8	Rachel Dawson	23', 34'
DF	26	Kayla Bashore
DF	27	Lauren Crandall
MF	13	Keli Smith
MF	17	Carrie Lingo
MF	28	Lauren Powley
FW	2	Angie Loy
FW	10	Tiffany Snow
FW	22	Kate Barber (c)
Substitutions:
DF	2	Melissa Leonetti		(substituted on) 14'
FW	9	Sarah Dawson		(substituted on) 70'
	15	Dana Sensenig		(substituted on) 14'
	18	Michelle Kasold		(substituted on) 70'
	23	Katelyn Falgowski		(substituted on) 18'
Manager:
(Australia) Lee Bodimeade

2007 Pan American Games winners

Argentina
Sixth title

=== Final standings ===
Rank	Team
Gold medal	Argentina
Silver medal	United States
Bronze medal	Netherlands Antilles
4	Chile
5	Canada
6	Cuba
7	Uruguay
8	Brazil

Qualified for the Summer Olympics

== Medalists ==
Event	Gold	Silver	Bronze
Women	Argentina; Gabriela Aguirre; Magdalena Aicega; Luciana Aymar; Noel Barrionuevo; Agustina Bouza; Claudia Burkart; Mariana González Oliva; Alejandra Gulla; Giselle Kañevsky; Rosario Luchetti; Daniela Maloberti; Mercedes Margalot; Carla Rebecchi; Marine Russo; Belen Succi; Paola Vukojicic	United States; Kate Barber; Kayla Bashore; Lauren Crandall; Rachel Dawson; Sarah Dawson; Kelly Doton; Katelyn Falgowski; Michelle Kasold; Melissa Leonetti; Carrie Lingo; Angela Loy; Lauren Powley; Dana Sensenig; Keli Smith; Tiffany Snow; Amy Tran	Netherlands Antilles; Anika de Haas; Anne Maaike Elsen; Jamaine Festen; Maria Hinskens; Floortje Joosten; Ilse Luirink; Theresia Noorlander; Juliette Plantenga; Pauline Roels; Ernestina Schreuder; Marlieke van de Pas; Sanne van Donk; Sophie van Noort; Nienke van Ruiten; Kiona Wellens; Eva Wiedijk
