= Janine Stanley =

Uruguayan field and indoor hockey player

Personal information
- Full name: Janine Marsha Stanley
- Born: 28 March 1991 (age 35) Uruguay
- Height: 164 cm (5 ft 5 in)

Sport
- Sport: Field hockey
- Position: Midfield
National team
Years	Team	Caps	Goals
2008–	Uruguay	90	(17)
2012	Uruguay U–21	6	(3)
Medal record
Representing Uruguay
Women's field hockey
South American Games
Bronze medal – third place	2014 Santiago	Team
South American Championship
Bronze medal – third place	2008 Montevideo	Team
Bronze medal – third place	2010 Rio de Janeiro	Team
Bronze medal – third place	2013 Santiago	Team

Janine Marsha Stanley (born 28 March 1991) is a Uruguayan field hockey player.

== Career ==
=== Junior national team ===
Stanley made her debut for the Uruguayan U–21 team in 2012 at the Pan American Junior Championship in Guadalajara.

=== Las Cimarronas ===
In 2008, Stanley made her debut for Las Cimarronas at the South American Championship in Montevideo.

Since her debut, Stanley has been a mainstay in the national team. She has won three bronze medals at South American Championships, including 2008, as well as 2010 and 2013 in Rio de Janeiro and Santiago, respectively. She also won bronze at the 2014 South American Games in Santiago.

In 2011 and 2013, Stanley was named in consecutive Pan American Elite Team by the Pan American Hockey Federation.

At the 2019 Pan American Games, Stanley was a member of the Uruguay team that finished 5th.
