= 2013 Women's South American Hockey Championship =

Field hockey tournament

Tournament details
- Host country: Chile
- City: Santiago
- Dates: January 26 – February 2
- Teams: 6
- Venue: Club Deportivo Manquehue

Final positions
- Champions: Argentina (5th title)
- Runner-up: Chile
- Third place: Uruguay

Tournament statistics
- Matches played: 18
- Goals scored: 143 (7.94 per match)
- Top scorer: (Chile) Paula Infante (12 goals)
- Best player: (Argentina) Agustina Albertario
- Best goalkeeper: (Brazil) Inge Joanna Vermeulen

The 2013 Women's South American Hockey Championship was the 5th edition of the Women's South American Hockey Championship. It was held between 26 January and 2 February 2013 in Santiago, Chile.

Argentina won the tournament for the fifth time after defeating Chile 4–0 in the final. Uruguay won the bronze medal after defeating Brazil 4–1 in the third place match.

== Umpires ==
The following umpires were appointed by the Pan American Hockey Federation to officiate the tournament:

- Rosario Ardanaz (URU)
- Camilia Cabargas (CHI)
- Catalina Montesino Wenzel (CHI)
- Megan Robertson (CAN)
- Luciana Suarez (ARG)
- Suzi Sutton (USA)
- Veronica Villafañe (ARG)

== Results ==
=== Pool matches ===
Pos	Team	Pld	W	D	L	GF	GA	GD	Pts	Qualification
1	Argentina	5	5	0	0	44	3	+41	15	Final
2	Chile	5	4	0	1	45	6	+39	12	Final
3	Uruguay	5	3	0	2	32	6	+26	9	
4	Brazil	5	1	1	3	7	8	−1	4	
5	Paraguay	5	1	1	3	4	33	−29	4	
6	Peru	5	0	0	5	0	76	−76	0	

Source: panamhockey.org
Rules for classification: 1) points; 2) goal difference; 3) goals scored; 4) head-to-head result.

26 January 2013
14:15

Argentina	20–0	Peru
Juárez 1'; Villarroya 5', 50'; Cedrés 10', 15'; Romang 14'; Granatto 18', 21', 40', 43', 61'; Lopez Basavilbaso 24'; Fernández Ladra 24'; Fernandez 28'; Albertario 31', 59'; Molina 37'; Villar 47', 66'; Zuloaga 57'	Report

Umpires:
Camila Cabargas (CHI)
Catalina Montesino Wenzel (CHI)

26 January 2013
16:00

Uruguay	1–0	Brazil
Norbis 44'	Report

Umpires:
Suzi Sutton (USA)
Luciana Suarez (ARG)

26 January 2013
17:45

Chile	10–0	Paraguay
Infante 3', 56'; García 7', 10', 51', 52'; Villagra 17'; Greene 23'; Vidaurre 29'; Venegas 62'	Report

Umpires:
Rosario Ardanaz (URU)
Megan Robertson (CAN)

27 January 2013
14:15

Peru	0–18	Uruguay
	Report	Mora 12'; Olave 12', 34', 40', 46'; Norbis 15', 23', 68'; Kliche 16', 56'; Coates 27', 32', 42', 62', 63'; De María 30'; Villar 51'; Aishemberg 59'

Umpires:
Suzi Sutton (USA)
Catalina Montesino Wenzel (CHI)

27 January 2013
16:00

Argentina	13–0	Paraguay
Romang 9', 28'; Albertario 19', 27', 66'; Cabut 21'; Lopez Basavilbaso 30', 32', 51'; Zuloaga 38'; Molina 48', 69'; Metidieri 64'	Report

Umpires:
Megan Robertson (CAN)
Camila Cabargas (CHI)

27 January 2013
17:45

Chile	4–0	Brazil
García 9'; Vidaurre 20'; Greene 35'; Barahona 52'	Report

Umpires:
Ayanna McLean (TTO)
Rosario Ardanaz (URU)

29 January 2013
08:15

Brazil	0–0	Paraguay
	Report

Umpires:
Camila Cabargas (CHI)
Rosario Ardanaz (URU)

29 January 2013
10:00

Peru	0–27	Chile
	Report	Vidaurre 2', 48'; Infante 5', 10', 18', 34', 37', 46', 53', 60', 64', 70'; Caram 8', 13', 19', 24', 39'; García 32', 35+', 36', 67', 68'; Villagra 40'; Venegas 50'; Barahona 55'; Greene 61', 69'

Umpires:
Luciana Suarez (ARG)
Suzi Sutton (USA)

29 January 2013
11:45

Uruguay	2–3	Argentina
Kliche 12'; De María 38'	Report	Romang 40'; Molina 46'; Fernández Ladra 49'

Umpires:
Ayanna McLean (TTO)
Megan Robertson (CAN)

30 January 2013
09:00

Brazil	7–0	Peru
Cabral 16', 30'; Lemos 28' de Oliveira 41'; Rodriguez 47'; Silva 55'; Machado 60'	Report

Umpires:
Camila Cabargas (CHI)
Rosario Ardanaz (URU)

30 January 2013
10:45

Paraguay	0–10	Uruguay
	Report	De María 7', 10'; Bisignano 26'; Mutilva 29'; Stanley 33'; Olave 35+'; Laborde 42'; Villar 49', 60'; Kliche 53'

Umpires:
Ayanna McLean (TTO)
Catalina Montesino Wenzel (CHI)

30 January 2013
15:00

Chile	1–5	Argentina
Caram 6'	Report	Albertario 4', 43'; Lopez Basavilbaso 16'; Cedrés 57'; Habif 69'

Umpires:
Suzi Sutton (USA)
Megan Robertson (CAN)

1 February 2013
13:30

Paraguay	4–0	Peru
Servián Giosa 6', 43'; Romero Gehrmann 53'; Cardozo Servín 69'	Report

Umpires:
Luciana Suarez (ARG)
Rosario Ardanaz (URU)

1 February 2013
15:15

Argentina	3–0	Brazil
Zuloaga 11'; Granatto 12'; Albertario 23'	Report

Umpires:
Camila Cabargas (CHI)
Catalina Montesino Wenzel (CHI)

1 February 2013
17:30

Uruguay	1–3	Chile
Villar 60'	Report	Caram 29'; Villagra 53'; Villalabeitia 68'

Umpires:
Ayanna McLean (TTO)
Suzi Sutton (USA)

=== Classification matches ===
==== Fifth and sixth place ====
2 February 2013
12:30

Paraguay	2–0	Peru
Servián Giosa 60'; Romero Gehrmann 69'	Report

Umpires:
Luciana Suarez (ARG)
Catalina Montesino Wenzel (CHI)

==== Third and fourth place ====
2 February 2013
14:30

Uruguay	4–1	Brazil
de María 5'; Olaso 14'; Vilar del Valle 60', 62'	Report	Sluis 66'

Umpires:
Camila Cabargas (CHI)
Ayanna McLean (TTO)

==== Final ====
2 February 2013
16:30

Argentina	4–0	Chile
Albertario 6'; Juárez 15', 38'; Fernández Ladra 49'	Report

Umpires:
Megan Robertson (CAN)
Suzi Sutton (USA)

== Awards ==
Best Player	Topscorer	Best Goalkeeper	Fair Play
(Argentina) Agustina Albertario	(Chile) Paula Infante	(Brazil) Inge Joanna Vermeulen	Peru

== Statistics ==
=== Final standings ===
Pos	Team	Pld	W	D	L	GF	GA	GD	Pts	Final standing
1st place, gold medalist(s)	Argentina	6	6	0	0	48	3	+45	18	Gold Medal
2nd place, silver medalist(s)	Chile	6	4	0	2	45	10	+35	12	Silver Medal
3rd place, bronze medalist(s)	Uruguay	6	4	0	2	36	7	+29	12	Bronze Medal
4	Brazil	6	1	1	4	8	12	−4	4	Fourth Place
5	Paraguay	6	2	1	3	6	33	−27	7	Fifth place
6	Peru	6	0	0	6	0	78	−78	0	Sixth Place

Source: panamhockey.org
