= 2008 Women's Hockey South American Championship =

Field hockey tournament

2010 Women's Hockey South American Championship
Tournament details
- Host country: Uruguay
- City: Montevideo
- Dates: 30 March – 6 April
- Teams: 6

Final positions
- Champions: Argentina (2nd title)
- Runner-up: Chile
- Third place: Uruguay

Tournament statistics
- Matches played: 18
- Goals scored: 119 (6.61 per match)
- Best player: (Argentina) Cecilia del Carril

The 2008 Women's Hockey South American Championship was the second edition of the South American Championship. It was held between 30 March and 6 April 2008 in Montevideo, Uruguay.

Argentina won the tournament for the second time, defeating Chile 5–1 in the final. Uruguay won the bronze medal after defeating Brazil 2–0 in the third place match.

== Umpires ==
The following umpires were appointed by the International Hockey Federation to officiate the tournament:

- Amy Hassick (USA)
- Cinthia Mellí (ARG)
- Beatriz Mongelos (PAR)
- Maritza Pérez (URU)
- Mariana Reydo (ARG)
- Claudia Videla (CHL)

== Results ==
=== Preliminary round ===
Pos	Team	Pld	W	D	L	GF	GA	GD	Pts	Qualification
1	Argentina	5	5	0	0	51	1	+50	15	Advanced to Final
2	Chile	5	3	1	1	20	7	+13	10	Advanced to Final
3	Uruguay	5	3	1	1	23	11	+12	10	
4	Brazil	5	2	0	3	8	14	−6	6	
5	Paraguay	5	1	0	4	2	34	−32	3	
6	Venezuela	5	0	0	5	4	41	−37	0	

Source: PAHF
Rules for classification: 1) points; 2) goal difference; 3) goals scored; 4) head-to-head result.

==== Fixtures ====
30 March 2008
08:30

Argentina	18–0	Venezuela
Muzaber 3', 22', 31'; García 5', 9', 14', 19', 47', 66'; Rodríguez 15'; Del Carril 17', 26', 44'; Pérez 21'; L. González 29'; Belda 30'; Bertarini 62'; Eichler 69'	Report

Umpires:
Amy Hassick (USA)
Beatriz Mongelos (PAR)

30 March 2008
10:30

Paraguay	0–8	Chile
	Report	Flores 5', 68'; Herrera 9'; Saieh 25'; Urroz 30', 57'; A. Sclabos 50'; M. MacKenna 53'

Umpires:
Mariana Reydo (ARG)
Maritza Pérez (URU)

30 March 2008
14:30

Uruguay	2–1	Brazil
Coates 42'; Zas 58'	Report	A. Rodríguez 50'

Umpires:
Cinthia Mellí (ARG)
Claudia Videla (CHL)

31 March 2008
14:00

Argentina	12–0	Paraguay
Muzaber 9', 48'; Koltes 17', 46'; Rodríguez 18', 53'; García 22', 33'; Pérez 27', 36'; Castro 36', 38'	Report

Umpires:
Maritza Pérez (URU)
Claudia Videla (CHL)

31 March 2008
16:00

Venezuela	0–9	Uruguay
	Report	Mora 19', 52', 62'; Nieto 25'; Olave 45'; Cristiani 57'; Coates 58', 60'; Olaso 66'

Umpires:
Mariana Reydo (ARG)
Cinthia Mellí (ARG)

31 March 2008
18:00

Chile	1–0	Brazil
Greene 59'	Report

Umpires:
Beatriz Mongelos (PAR)
Amy Hassick (USA)

2 April 2008
15:00

Paraguay	2–1	Venezuela
Ruíz 16'; Riquelme 50'	Report	Llosa 17'

Umpires:
Claudia Videla (CHL)
Amy Hassick (USA)

2 April 2008
17:00

Brazil	0–9	Argentina
	Report	Eichler 2', 48'; Rodríguez 14', 19', 24', 58'; Del Carril 41'; García 61'; Pérez 63'

Umpires:
Beatriz Mongelos (PAR)
Maritza Pérez (URU)

2 April 2008
19:00

Chile	2–2	Uruguay
Pollmann 20'; C. Sclabos 34'	Report	Nieto 37'; Coates 69'

Umpires:
Cinthia Mellí (ARG)
Mariana Reydo (ARG)

3 April 2008
15:00

Brazil	3–0	Paraguay
Boos 8'; Vásques 21'; Machado 27'	Report

Umpires:
Maritza Pérez (URU)
Mariana Reydo (ARG)

3 April 2008
17:00

Chile	8–1	Venezuela
Flores 8', 41', 50'; C. Sclabos 31'; Wagner 47', 54'; A. Sclabos 59'; Urroz 69'	Report	Aguilar 39'

Umpires:
Cinthia Mellí (ARG)
Beatriz Mongelos (PAR)

3 April 2008
19:00

Uruguay	0–8	Argentina
	Report	Eichler 3', 39', 49'; García 13', 43', 64'; Muzaber 18'; Pérez 35'

Umpires:
Amy Hassick (USA)
Claudia Videla (CHL)

5 April 2008
10:00

Uruguay	10–0	Paraguay
Cristiani 2'; Mora 11', 33', 40', 58'; Coates 17', 26'; Ripoll 29'; Olaso 36'; Nieto 46'	Report

Umpires:
Mariana Reydo (ARG)
Claudia Videla (CHL)

5 April 2008
14:00

Venezuela	2–4	Brazil
Llosa 40'; Cottín 41'	Report	A. Rodríguez 33'; Vásques 50'; Boos 58'; Cabral 66'

Umpires:
Beatriz Mongelos (PAR)
Cinthia Mellí (ARG)

5 April 2008
18:00

Argentina	4–1	Chile
Muzaber 4', 7'; Rodríguez 46'; Del Carril 61'	Report	Flores 47'

Umpires:
Amy Hassick (USA)
Maritza Pérez (URU)

=== Classification round ===
==== Fifth and sixth place ====
6 April 2008
08:00

Paraguay	0–3	Venezuela
	Report	Cottín 27', 70'; Llosa 52'

Umpires:
Cinthia Mellí (ARG)
Mariana Reydo (ARG)

==== Third and fourth place ====
6 April 2008
12:30

Uruguay	2–0	Brazil
Coates 19'; Nieto 35'	Report

Umpires:
Beatriz Mongelos (PAR)
Claudia Videla (CHL)

==== Final ====
6 April 2008
17:00

Argentina	5–1	Chile
García 16'; Bertarini 21'; Muzaber 37', 45'; Eichler 56'	Report	Greene 40'

Umpires:
Maritza Pérez (URU)
Amy Hassick (USA)

== Statistics ==
=== Final standings ===
- Note: as Argentina qualified for the 2009 Pan American Cup as defending champions, the qualification quota was moved to second placed team, Chile.

Pos	Team	Pld	W	D	L	GF	GA	GD	Pts	Qualification
1st place, gold medalist(s)	Argentina	6	6	0	0	56	2	+54	18	
2nd place, silver medalist(s)	Chile	6	3	1	2	21	12	+9	10	2009 Women's Pan American Cup
3rd place, bronze medalist(s)	Uruguay	6	4	1	1	25	11	+14	13	
4	Brazil	6	2	0	4	8	16	−8	6	
5	Paraguay	6	1	0	5	2	37	−35	3	
6	Venezuela	6	1	0	5	7	41	−34	3	

Source: PAHF

=== Goalscorers ===
There were 119 goals scored in 18 matches, for an average of 6.61 goals per match.

13 goals

- (Argentina) Natalia García

10 goals

- (Argentina) Bárbara Muzaber

8 goals

- (Argentina) Macarena Rodríguez

7 goals

- (Argentina) Sofía Eichler
- (Uruguay) Mercedes Coates
- (Uruguay) Sofía Mora

6 goals

- (Chile) Francisca Flores

5 goals

- (Argentina) Cecilia del Carril
- (Argentina) Paula Pérez

4 goals

- (Uruguay) Agustina Nieto

3 goals

- (Chile) Manuela Urroz
- (Venezuela) María Rebeca Cottín
- (Venezuela) Ana María Llosa

2 goals

- (Argentina) Ana Bertarini
- (Argentina) Paula Castro
- (Argentina) Gabriela Koltes
- (Brazil) Patrícia Boos
- (Brazil) Anita Rodríguez
- (Brazil) Djeniffer Vásques
- (Chile) Andrea Greene
- (Chile) Alexandra Sclabos
- (Chile) Catalina Sclabos
- (Chile) Cristina Wagner
- (Uruguay) Magdalena Cristiani
- (Uruguay) Isabel Olaso

1 goal

- (Argentina) Analía Belda
- (Argentina) Lucía González
- (Brazil) Thalita Cabral
- (Brazil) Tatiana Machado
- (Chile) Francisca Herrera
- (Chile) María José MacKenna
- (Chile) Marianne Pollmann
- (Chile) Paula Saieh
- (Paraguay) Soledad Ruíz Díaz
- (Paraguay) Fernanda Riquelme
- (Uruguay) Anastásia Olave
- (Uruguay) Carolina Ripoll
- (Uruguay) Macarena Zas
- (Venezuela) Marián Aguilar
