= Sofía Filipek =

Chilean field hockey player

Personal information
- Full name: María Sofía Filipek Carvallo
- Born: 9 August 1994 (age 32) Santiago, Chile
- Height: 167 cm (5 ft 6 in)
- Weight: 55 kg (121 lb)

Sport
- Sport: Field hockey
- Position: Midfield
- Club: COGS
National team
Years	Team	Caps	Goals
2012	Chile U21	7	(0)
2012–	Chile	140	(15)
Medal record
Women's field hockey
Representing Chile
Pan American Games
Bronze medal – third place	2023 Santiago	Team
Pan American Cup
Silver medal – second place	2017 Lancaster
Silver medal – second place	2022 Santiago
FIH Nations Cup
Bronze medal – third place	2023–24 Terrassa	Team
South American Games
Silver medal – second place	2014 Santiago	Team
Bronze medal – third place	2018 Cochabamba	Team
South American Championship
Silver medal – second place	2013 Santiago

María Sofía Filipek Carvallo (born 9 August 1994) is a field hockey player from Chile, who plays as a midfielder.

== Personal life ==
Sofía Filipek was a student at Universidad de Chile in Santiago, where she studied Commercial Engineering.

== Career ==
=== Club hockey ===
Filipek is a member of the COGS hockey club based in Santiago.

=== National teams ===
Sofía Filipek has represented Chile at both junior and senior levels.

==== Under–21 ====
In 2012, Filipek was a member of the national team Chile U–21 at the Pan American Junior Championship in Guadalajara.

==== Las Diablas ====
Following her junior debut, Filipek also represented the national team for the first time in 2012.

Filipek won her first medal with Las Diablas in 2013 at the South American Championship in Santiago, where she took home silver. She has also medalled at the 2014 and 2018 South American Games, as well as the 2017 Pan American Cup, winning silver, bronze and silver, respectively.

Throughout her career, Filipek has competed in many major tournaments; most notably the 2015 Pan American Games in Toronto.
