= Andrea Greene =

Chilean field hockey player

Personal information
- Born: 12 May 1988 (age 38) Santiago, Chile
- Height: 162 cm (5 ft 4 in)

Sport
- Sport: Field hockey
- Position: Forward
National team
Years	Team	Caps	Goals
2008–2015	Chile	32	(7)
2008–2009	Chile U–21	12	(6)
Medal record
Representing Chile
Women's field hockey
South American Championship
Silver medal – second place	2008 Montevideo	Team
Silver medal – second place	2013 Santiago	Team
Pan American Junior Championship
Silver medal – second place	2008 Mexico City	Team

Andrea Greene (born 12 May 1988) is a Chilean former field hockey player who played as a forward.

== Personal life ==
Greene was born and raised in Santiago, Chile.

== Career ==
=== Under–21 ===
Greene made her debut for the Chile U–21 team at the 2008 Pan American Championship in Mexico City, where she won a silver medal.

The following year she appeared at the 2009 FIH Junior World Cup in Boston.

=== Las Diablas ===
Greene made her debut for Las Diablas in 2008, at the South American Championship in Montevideo. After her debut, Greene had a five-year hiatus from the national team.

In 2013, Greene returned to the national team for the 2013 edition of the South American Championship in Santiago. She went on to represent the team later that year during the Round 2 and Semi-Final events of the 2012–13 Women's FIH World League, held in Rio de Janeiro and Rotterdam, respectively.

She made her final appearance in 2015 during a test series against South Africa in Cape Town.
