= Gabriela Aguirre =

Argentine field hockey player

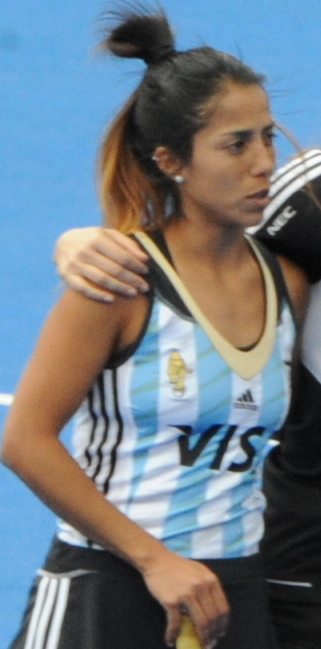
- Aguirre in 2016

Personal information
- Born: 19 February 1986 (age 40) Salta, Argentina
- Height: 1.64 m (5 ft 5 in)

Sport
- Sport: Field hockey
- Position: Midfielder
- Club: Banco Provincia
Senior career
Years	Team	Caps	Goals
–	Banco Provincia	-	-
National team
Years	Team	Caps	Goals
2005	Argentina U21		-
2006–2009, 2016	Argentina	90	-
Medal record
Women's Field hockey
Representing Argentina
World Cup
Bronze medal – third place	2006 Madrid	Team
Champions Trophy
Gold medal – first place	2016 London	Team
Gold medal – first place	2008 Mönchengladbach	Team
Silver medal – second place	2007 Quilmes	Team
Pan American Games
Gold medal – first place	2007 Rio de Janeiro	Team
Pan American Cup
Gold medal – first place	2009 Hamilton	Team

Gabriela Aguirre (born 19 February 1986) is an Argentine field hockey midfielder and part of the Argentina national team. She was part of the Argentine team at the 2016 Summer Olympics in Rio de Janeiro. On club level she plays for Banco Provincia in Argentina.
