= Brazil women's national field hockey team =

Brazil
- Association: Brazilian Confederation of Hockey on Grass and Indoor (CBHG)
- Confederation: PAHF (Americas)
- Head Coach: Ignacio López
- Manager: Veronica Covarrubias
- Captain: Mayara Fedrizzi

FIH ranking
- Current: 72 ▼9 (10 March 2026)

Pan American Games
- Appearances: 1 (first in 2007)
- Best result: 8th (2007)

Pan American Cup
- Appearances: 1 (first in 2017)
- Best result: 7th (2017)
Medal record
South American Championship
Bronze medal – third place	2016 Chiclayo

The Brazil women's national field hockey team (Portuguese: Seleção Brasileira de Hóquei sobre a Grama Feminino) represents Brazil in international women's field hockey competitions.

== Tournament history ==
=== Pan American Games ===
- 2007 – 8th place

=== Pan American Cup ===
- 2017 – 7th place

=== South American Games ===
- 2006 – 4th place
- 2014 – 4th place
- 2018 – 4th place

=== South American Championship ===
- 2008 – 4th place
- 2010 – 4th place
- 2013 – 4th place
- 2016 – (bronze)

=== Pan American Challenge ===
- 2011 – (bronze)
- 2015 – (gold)
- 2021 – 4th place
- 2024 – 5th place

=== Hockey World League ===
- 2012–13 – 29th place

=== FIH Hockey Series ===
- 2018–19 – First round

== See also ==
- Brazil men's national field hockey team
