= Field hockey at the 2006 South American Games =

- Venue: CeNARD Hockey Stadium
- Location: Buenos Aires, Argentina
- Dates: 9–19 November
- Competitors: 144 from 5 nations

Champions
- Men: Argentina
- Women: Argentina

The men's and women's field hockey competitions at the 2006 South American Games were the first inclusion of hockey at the South American Games. Both tournaments were held in conjunction with one another between 9 and 19 November 2006 at the CeNARD Hockey Stadium in Buenos Aires, Argentina.

In the men's competition, Argentina won the gold medal by defeating Chile 6–0 in the final. Peru won the bronze medal by defeating Uruguay 3–0 in a penalty shoot-out following a 0–0 draw.

In the women's competition, Argentina won the gold medal by defeating Chile 4–0 in the final. Uruguay won the bronze medal by defeating Brazil 4–0.

== Participating nations ==
=== Men's tournament ===
- Argentina
- Brazil
- Chile
- ~~Paraguay~~
- Peru
- Uruguay

=== Women's tournament ===
- Argentina
- Brazil
- Chile
- ~~Paraguay~~
- Uruguay

Both Paraguay men's and women's teams withdrew prior to the tournament.

== Medals ==
=== Medal summary ===
Event	Gold	Silver	Bronze
Men	Argentina	Chile	Peru
Women	Argentina	Chile	Uruguay

=== Medal table ===
* Host nation (Argentina)

Rank	Nation	Gold	Silver	Bronze	Total
1	Argentina (ARG)*	2	0	0	2
2	Chile (CHI)	0	2	0	2
3	Peru (PER)	0	0	1	1
3	Uruguay (URU)	0	0	1	1
Totals (4 entries)		2	2	2	6

== Men's tournament ==
Men's field hockey at the 2006 South American Games
Tournament details
- Host country: Argentina
- City: Buenos Aires
- Dates: 9–19 November
- Teams: 5 (from 1 confederation)
- Venue: CeNARD Hockey Stadium

Final positions
- Champions: Argentina (1st title)
- Runner-up: Chile
- Third place: Peru

Tournament statistics
- Matches played: 12
- Goals scored: 75 (6.25 per match)
- Top scorer: (Argentina) Lucas Rossi (7 goals)
- Best player: (Chile) Sebastián Kapsch
- Best goalkeeper: (Brazil) Leonardo Marafoni

=== Pool matches ===
Pos	Team	Pld	W	D	L	GF	GA	GD	Pts	Qualification
1	Argentina (H)	4	3	1	0	31	0	+31	10	Gold-medal match
2	Chile	4	3	1	0	25	1	+24	10	Gold-medal match
3	Uruguay	4	2	0	2	7	16	−9	6	Bronze-medal match
4	Peru	4	1	0	3	3	22	−19	3	Bronze-medal match
5	Brazil	4	0	0	4	3	30	−27	0	

Source: PanAmHockey
Rules for classification: 1) points; 2) goal difference; 3) goals scored; 4) head-to-head result.
(H) Hosts

9 November 2006
10:00

Uruguay	3–1	Peru
Vasquez 17'; Castillos 56', 70'	Report	Vargas 55'

Umpires:
Albert Marcano (TTO)
Diego Barbas (ARG)

9 November 2006
14:00

Chile	9–1	Brazil
Kannegisser 11', 41', 46', 48'; Koppenberger 20', 66'; Stein 38'; Kapsch 55'; Valenzuela 63'	Report	Rews 22'

Umpires:
Daniel Gonzalez (PER)
Daniel Lopez (URU)

11 November 2006
14:00

Uruguay	0–6	Chile
	Report	Koppenberger 13'; Valenzuela 19', 40'; Krainz 27'; Stein 54', 64'

Umpires:
Juan Bonelli (ARG)
Saleem Aaron (USA)

11 November 2006
16:00

Peru	0–9	Argentina
	Report	Riccardi 9'; L. Argento Innocente 14', 56'; Rossi 24'; Saliva 32', 46'; Encinas 35'; T. Argento Innocente 45', 63'

Umpires:
Diego Wenz (CHL)
Albert Marcano (TTO)

12 November 2006
16:00

Peru	0–10	Chile
	Report	Krainz 7', 28', 46'; G. Thierman 16'; Khulenthal 33', 41'; Valenzuela 43'; Kannegisser 53', 57'; Koppenberger 62'

Umpires:
Diego Barbas (ARG)
Daniel Lopez (URU)

12 November 2006
18:00

Argentina	15–0	Brazil
L. Argento Innocente 1', 40'; Rossi 4', 61'; T. Argento Innocente 6'; Orozco 26', 38'; Riccardi 33'; Cammareri 37', 49', 65'; Saladino 41', 63'; Corradini 50'; Saliva 52'	Report

Umpires:
Saleem Aaron (USA)
Daniel Gonzalez (PER)

14 November 2006
14:00

Peru	2–0	Brazil
Vargas 54'; Henze 64'	Report

Umpires:
Diego Wenz (CHL)
Juan Bonelli (ARG)

14 November 2006
18:00

Uruguay	0–7	Argentina
	Report	Orozco 11'; Rossi 20'; Saliva 22'; Saladino 31'; Riccardi 32', 58'; L. Argento Innocente 45'

Umpires:
Daniel Gonzalez (PER)
Albert Marcano (TTO)

16 November 2006
14:00

Brazil	2–4	Uruguay
Eger 50'; Höck 70'	Report	M. Tixe 22'; Comalino 46'; Castillos 55'; Martinez 66'

Umpires:
Diego Barbas (ARG)
Juan Bonelli (ARG)

16 November 2006
18:00

Chile	0–0	Argentina
	Report

Umpires:
Daniel Lopez (URU)
Saleem Aaron (USA)

=== Medal round ===
==== Bronze-medal match ====
19 November 2006
13:30

Uruguay	0–0	Peru
	Report
Penalties
Colina (penalty shoot-out missed); Pouquette (penalty shoot-out missed); Stanham (penalty shoot-out missed)	0–3	(penalty shoot-out scored) Vargas; (penalty shoot-out scored) Lazarte; (penalty shoot-out scored) Henze

Umpires:
Diego Wenz (CHL)
Diego Barbas (ARG)

==== Gold-medal match ====
19 November 2006
18:30

Argentina	6–0	Chile
Rossi 18', 21', 33'; T. Argento Innocente 44'; Saliva 47'; Vila 70'	Report

Umpires:
Saleem Aaron (USA)
Albert Marcano (TTO)

=== Final standings ===
Rank	Team
1st place, gold medalist(s)	Argentina
2nd place, silver medalist(s)	Chile
3rd place, bronze medalist(s)	Peru
4	Uruguay
5	Brazil

Qualified for the 2007 Pan American Games

== Women's tournament ==
Women's field hockey at the 2006 South American Games
Tournament details
- Host country: Argentina
- City: Buenos Aires
- Dates: 9–19 November
- Teams: 4 (from 1 confederation)
- Venue: CeNARD Hockey Stadium

Final positions
- Champions: Argentina (1st title)
- Runner-up: Chile
- Third place: Uruguay

Tournament statistics
- Matches played: 8
- Goals scored: 45 (5.63 per match)
- Top scorer(s): (Argentina) Gabriela Aguirre (Chile) Daniela Caram (5 goals)
- Best player: (Chile) Carolina García
- Best goalkeeper: (Brazil) Madja Fawakhiri

=== Pool matches ===
Pos	Team	Pld	W	D	L	GF	GA	GD	Pts	Qualification
1	Argentina (H)	3	3	0	0	19	0	+19	9	Gold-medal match
2	Chile	3	2	0	1	12	6	+6	6	Gold-medal match
3	Uruguay	3	1	0	2	6	5	+1	3	Bronze-medal match
4	Brazil	3	0	0	3	0	26	−26	0	Bronze-medal match

Source: PanAmHockey
Rules for classification: 1) points; 2) goal difference; 3) goals scored; 4) head-to-head result.
(H) Hosts

9 November 2006
16:00

Uruguay	6–0	Brazil
Dupont 17'; Bisignano 20', 44'; De María 32', 40'; Gibernau 49'	Report

Umpires:
Cintia Meli (ARG)
Claudia Videla Baeza (CHL)

10 November 2006
18:00

Argentina	10–0	Brazil
Aguirre 2', 5', 29', 34'; Bianchini 25'; Luchetti 47'; S. D'Elía 50'; Rojas 58'; Kañevsky 64'; Bouza 69'	Report

Umpires:
Maria Mongelos (PAR)
Maritza Pérez Castro (URU)

12 November 2006
14:00

Chile	2–0	Uruguay
Caram 7'; Wilson 38'	Report

Umpires:
Natalia Piccinin (ARG)
Cintia Meli (ARG)

14 November 2006
18:00

Argentina	6–0	Chile
Luchetti 11', 39'; F. D'Elía 20'; S. D'Elía 29'; Barrionuevo 63'; Bouza 68'	Report

Umpires:
Maria Mongelos (PAR)
Maritza Pérez Castro (URU)

16 November 2006
12:00

Chile	10–0	Brazil
Caram 3', 40', 42', 67'; Fernandez 4'; Villagra 35'; Albertz 44'; Infante 49'; Flores 58'; García 64'	Report

Umpires:
Natalia Piccinin (ARG)
Cintia Meli (ARG)

16 November 2006
16:00

Uruguay	0–3	Argentina
	Report	Kañevsky 3'; Bouza 30'; Maloberti 42'

Umpires:
Claudia Videla Baeza (CHL)
Maria Mongelos (PAR)

=== Medal round ===
==== Bronze-medal match ====
19 November 2006
11:00

Uruguay	4–0	Brazil
Gibernau 26'; Ceretta 30'; Bisignano 50'; Campos 61'	Report

Umpires:
Natalia Piccinin (ARG)
Claudia Videla Baeza (CHL)

==== Gold-medal match ====
19 November 2006
16:00

Argentina	4–0	Chile
Maloberti 12'; Aguirre 27'; S. D'Elía 61'; Luchetti 65'	Report

Umpires:
Maria Mongelos (PAR)
Maritza Pérez Castro (URU)

=== Final standings ===
Rank	Team
1st place, gold medalist(s)	Argentina
2nd place, silver medalist(s)	Chile
3rd place, bronze medalist(s)	Uruguay
4	Brazil

Qualified for the 2007 Pan American Games
