= Constanza Palma =

Chilean field hockey player

Personal information
- Full name: Constanza María Palma Parra
- Born: 29 March 1992 (age 34) Santiago, Chile
- Height: 155 cm (5 ft 1 in)
- Weight: 55 kg (121 lb)

Sport
- Sport: Field hockey
- Position: Midfield
National team
Years	Team	Caps	Goals
2009–2012	Chile U21	15	(0)
2010–	Chile	173	(7)
Medal record
Women's field hockey
Representing Chile
Pan American Cup
Silver medal – second place	2017 Lancaster
Silver medal – second place	2022 Santiago
FIH Nations Cup
Bronze medal – third place	2023–24 Terrassa	Team
South American Games
Silver medal – second place	2014 Santiago	Team
Bronze medal – third place	2018 Cochabamba	Team
South American Championship
Silver medal – second place	2010 Rio de Janeiro

Constanza María Palma Parra (born 29 March 1992) is a field hockey player from Chile, who plays as a midfielder.

== Personal life ==
Constanza Palma was born and raised in Santiago, Chile.

== Career ==
=== Hockey ===
Constanza Palma has represented Chile at both junior and senior levels.

==== Under–21 ====
In 2009, Palma was a member of the Chile U–21 at the FIH Junior World Cup in Boston.

Three years later in 2012, she represented the team at the Pan American Junior Championship in Guadalajara.

==== Las Diablas ====
Palma made her debut for Las Diablas in 2010. Her first major tournament for the team was the same year, at the South American Championships, held in Rio de Janeiro.

Since her debut, Palma has medalled many times with the national team. This includes silver and bronze at the 2014 and the 2018 South American Games respectively, bronze at the 2018–19 FIH Series Finals, and most notably silver at the 2017 Pan American Cup.

=== CrossFit ===
In addition to hockey, Palma also competes in CrossFit. She participated in the annual CrossFit Games from 2014 to 2017.
