= Florencia Peñalba =

Uruguayan field hockey player

María Barreiro
Personal information
- Full name: Florencia Belén Peñalba Antoria
- Born: 9 September 1999 (age 27) Uruguay
- Height: 158 cm (5 ft 2 in)
- Weight: 56 kg (123 lb)

Sport
- Sport: Field hockey
- Position: Defence
National team
Years	Team	Caps	Goals
2016–2021	Uruguay U–21	10	(0)
2018–	Uruguay	14	(0)
Medal record
Representing Uruguay
Women's field hockey
Pan American Cup
Bronze medal – third place	2025 Montevideo	Team
South American Games
Bronze medal – third place	2022 Asunción	Team
Bronze medal – third place	2026 Santa Fe	Team
Pan American Junior Championship
Silver medal – second place	2021 Santiago	Team

Florencia Belén Peñalba Antoria (born 9 September 1999) is a Uruguayan field hockey player, who plays as a defender.

== Career ==
=== Under–21 ===
Peñalba made her debut for the Uruguay U–21 team at the Pan American Junior Championships in Tacarigua.

In 2021 she represented the team again, winning silver at the 2021 Pan American Junior Championship in Santiago.

=== Las Cimarronas ===
Peñalba made her senior international debut for Las Cimarronas in 2018, during the FIH Series Open in Santiago.

She won her first medal with the national team in 2022, taking home bronze at the South American Games in Asunción.

In 2023 she was named in the squad for the Pan American Games in Santiago.
