= Javiera Villagra =

Chilean field hockey player

Personal information
- Full name: Javiera Villagra Lira
- Born: 17 March 1983 (age 43) Santiago, Chile
- Height: 162 cm (5 ft 4 in)
- Weight: 52 kg (115 lb)

Sport
- Sport: Field hockey
- Position: Midfield
National team
Years	Team	Caps	Goals
1997–2015	Chile	165	(–)
2000–2001	Chile U–21	13	(2)
Medal record
Women's field hockey
Representing Chile
Pan American Games
Bronze medal – third place	2011 Guadalajara	Team
South American Games
Silver medal – second place	2006 Buenos Aires	Team
Silver medal – second place	2014 Santiago	Team
Pan American Cup
Bronze medal – third place	2009 Hamilton	Team
South American Championship
Silver medal – second place	2013 Santiago	Team

Javiera Villagra Lira (born 17 March 1983) is a former field hockey player from Chile, who played as a midfielder.

== Personal life ==
Javiera Villagra was born and raised in Santiago, Chile.

== Career ==
=== College sport ===
In 2003, Villagra travelled to the United States to play college sport for American University in Washington. She was a member of the AU Eagles until 2005. She was named an All–American on three occasions by the NFHCA.

=== Las Diablas ===
Villagra made her debut for Las Diablas in 1997, at just 14 years of age.

Following her debut, Villagra was a mainstay in the national team for 18 years, until her retirement in 2015 following the Pan American Games.

Throughout her career, Villagra medalled many times, most notably winning bronze at both the 2009 Pan American Cup in Hamilton, and the 2011 Pan American Games in Guadalajara.
