= Sofia Walbaum =

Chilean field hockey player (born 1989)

Personal information
- Full name: Sofia Walbaum
- Born: 18 May 1989 (age 37) Chile

Sport
- Sport: Field hockey
- Position: Defender
- Club: PWCC
National team
Years	Team	Caps	Goals
2005–	Chile	210	-
Medal record
Women's field hockey
Representing Chile
Pan American Games
Bronze medal – third place	2011 Guadalajara	Team
Pan American Cup
Silver medal – second place	2017 Lancaster	Team
Bronze medal – third place	2009 Hamilton	Team
South American Games
Silver medal – second place	2006 Buenos Aires	Team
Silver medal – second place	2014 Santiago	Team

Sofia Walbaum (born 18 May 1989) is a Chilean field hockey player.

Walbaum has represented Chile at both junior and senior levels. She made her junior debut at the 2005 Pan-Am Junior Championship, and her senior debut one year later in 2006. Her first major tournament was the 2006 South American Games.

Walbaum was instrumental in Chile's success at the 2017 Pan American Cup, scoring 2 goals in her team's campaign. The team ultimately lost to Argentina 4–1 in the final.
