= Sol Amadeo =

Uruguayan field hockey player

Personal information
- Full name: Sol Amadeo Gaviña
- Born: 30 May 1996 (age 30) Uruguay
- Height: 152 cm (5 ft 0 in)
- Weight: 50 kg (110 lb)

Sport
- Sport: Field hockey
- Position: Midfield
National team
Years	Team	Caps	Goals
2016	Uruguay U–21	6	(6)
2016–	Uruguay	33	(9)
Medal record
Representing Uruguay
Women's field hockey
Pan American Cup
Bronze medal – third place	2025 Montevideo
South American Games
Bronze medal – third place	2022 Asunción	Team

Sol Amadeo Gaviña (born 30 May 1996) is a Uruguayan field hockey player, who plays as a midfielder.

== Career ==
=== Under–21 ===
In 2016, Amadeo was a member of the Uruguay U–21 team at the Pan American Junior Championships in Tacarigua.

=== Las Cimarronas ===
Amadeo made her senior international debut for Las Cimarronas in 2016, during the FIH World League in Chiclayo.

Since her debut, Amadeo has been a constant member in the national team. She won bronze at the 2022 edition of the South American Games in Asunción.

In 2023, she was named in the squad for the Pan American Games in Santiago.
