= Anastásia Olave =

Uruguayan field and indoor hockey player

Personal information
- Full name: Anastásia Olave Solari
- Born: 5 May 1989 (age 37) Uruguay
- Height: 166 cm (5 ft 5 in)

Sport
- Sport: Field hockey
- Position: Forward
National team
Years	Team	Caps	Goals
2008–	Uruguay	68	(26)
2010–2011	Uruguay Indoor	11	(9)
Medal record
Representing Uruguay
Women's field hockey
South American Games
Silver medal – second place	2018 Cochabamba	Team
Women's indoor hockey
Indoor Pan American Cup
Silver medal – second place	2010 Barquisimeto	Team

Anastásia Olave Solari (born 5 May 1989) is an indoor and field hockey player from Uruguay.

== Career ==
=== Field hockey ===
Olave made her debut for Las Cimarronas in 2008, at the South American Championship in Montevideo.

Since her debut, Olave has gone on the represent the national team in multiple major tournaments. In 2018, she won a silver medal with the team at the South American Games in Cochabamba.

In 2019, she was a member of the team at the Pan American Games in Lima.

=== Indoor ===
Anastásia Olave made her debut for the Uruguayan indoor team at the 2010 Indoor Pan American Cup, where she won a silver medal.

She went on to represent the team again at the 2011 Indoor World Cup in Poznań.
