= Daniela Caram =

Chilean field hockey player

Personal information
- Full name: Daniela Caram
- Born: 24 November 1986 (age 39) Chile

Sport
- Sport: Field hockey
- Position: Attacker
National team
Years	Team	Caps	Goals
2005–2015	Chile	115	-
Medal record
Women's field hockey
Representing Chile
Pan American Games
Bronze medal – third place	2011 Guadalajara	Team
Pan American Cup
Bronze medal – third place	2009 Hamilton	Team
South American Games
Silver medal – second place	2006 Buenos Aires	Team
Silver medal – second place	2014 Santiago	Team

Daniela Caram (born 24 November 1986) is a former Chilean field hockey player.

== Personal life ==
Caram's younger sister, Camila, also represents the Chile national team, and is their current captain.

== Career ==
=== Junior National Team ===
Caram made her debut for the Chile junior national team in 2005. First at the 2005 Pan-American Junior Championship, which served as a qualifier for the Junior World Cup in Santiago.

Caram again represented Chile at the Junior World Cup, where the team finished in 10th place.

=== Senior National Team ===
Caram debuted for the senior national team in 2005.

Her first major tournament with the team being the 2006 South American Games. The team won a silver medal in the inaugural field hockey tournament at the South American Games.

Following her debut, Caram represented Chile up until 2015, retiring after the 2015 Pan American Games.

Following the Pan American Games, Caram was named in the 2015 Pan American Elite Team for the first time by the Pan American Hockey Federation.
