= Francisca Flores (field hockey) =

Chilean field hockey player

Personal information
- Full name: Francisca Flores Cariola
- Born: 25 October 1985 (age 40) Santiago, Chile

Sport
- Sport: Field hockey
- Position: Defence
National team
Years	Team	Caps	Goals
2005	Chile U–21	11	(0)
2006–2015	Chile	79	(15)
Medal record
Women's field hockey
Representing Chile
Pan American Cup
Silver medal – second place	2022 Santiago
Bronze medal – third place	2009 Hamilton
South American Games
Silver medal – second place	2006 Buenos Aires	Team
Pan American Junior Championship
Bronze medal – third place	2005 San Juan

Francisca Flores Cariola (born 25 October 1985) is a former field hockey player from Chile, who played as a defender.

== Personal life ==
Francisca Flores has a younger sister, Fernanda, who also played international hockey for Chile.

== Career ==
=== Junior national team ===
Flores made her debut for the Chile U–21 team in 2005 at the Pan American Junior Championship in San Juan. Later that year she represented the team at the FIH Junior World Cup in her hometown, Santiago.

=== Las Diablas ===
In 2006, Flores made her debut for Las Diablas at the South American Games in Buenos Aires.

Flores went on to make represent the national team over a nine-year period. Most notably, in 2009 she won a bronze medal at the Pan American Cup in Hamilton. She made her final appearance for the national team in 2015 during the 2014–15 FIH World League.
