= Victoria Zuloaga =

Argentine field hockey player (born 1988)

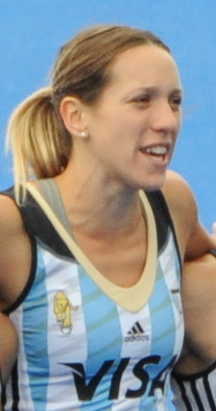
- Zuloaga in 2016

Personal information
- Full name: María Victoria Zuloaga
- Born: February 14, 1988 (age 38) Buenos Aires, Argentina
- Height: 1.72 m (5 ft 7 1/2 in)

Sport
- Sport: Field hockey
- Club: Mar del Plata Club
Senior career
Years	Team	Caps	Goals
–	Lomas Athletic Club	-	-
National team
Years	Team	Caps	Goals
2008–2009	Argentina U21		-
2009–2016	Argentina	68	-
Medal record
Women's Field hockey
Representing Argentina
World League
Gold medal – first place	2014-15 Rosario	Team
Champions Trophy
Gold medal – first place	2016 London	Team
Silver medal – second place	2011 Amstelveen	Team
Pan American Games
Silver medal – second place	2011 Guadalajara	Team
Pan American Cup
Gold medal – first place	2009 Hamilton	Team
Junior World Cup
Silver medal – second place	2009 Boston	Team
- Updated on October 6, 2012

María Victoria Zuloaga Arcodia (born 14 February 1988) is an Argentine field hockey player. At the 2011 Champions Trophy and 2011 Pan American Games, she competed for the Argentina national field hockey team winning the silver medal in both tournaments. After not being considered by different coaches, she made her return to the national team in late 2015 and won the 2014–2015 World League.
