= Uruguay women's national field hockey team =

Uruguay
- Nickname(s): Cimarronas
- Association: PAHF (Americas)
- Confederation: Federacion Uruguaya de Hockey sobre Cesped
- Head Coach: Rolando Rivero
- Assistant coach(es): Nicolás Tixe
- Manager: Mariana Gomez
- Captain: Manuela Vilar
Home	Away

FIH ranking
- Current: 19 ▲1 (21 September 2026)

Pan American Games
- Appearances: 5 (first in 2003)
- Best result: 3rd (2003)

Pan American Cup
- Appearances: 6 (first in 2001)
- Best result: 3rd (2025)
Medal record
Event	1st	2nd	3rd
Pan American Games	0	0	1
Pan American Cup	0	0	1
South American Games	0	1	4
South American Championship	1	0	4
Total	1	1	10
Pan American Games
Bronze medal – third place	2003 Santo Domingo	Team
Pan American Cup
Silver medal – second place	2025 Montevideo	
South American Games
Silver medal – second place	2018 Cochabamba	Team
Bronze medal – third place	2006 Buenos Aires	Team
Bronze medal – third place	2014 Santiago	Team
Bronze medal – third place	2022 Asunción	Team
Bronze medal – third place	2026 Santa Fe	Team
South American Championship
Gold medal – first place	2016 Chiclayo	
Bronze medal – third place	2003 Santiago	
Bronze medal – third place	2008 Montevideo	
Bronze medal – third place	2010 Rio de Janeiro	
Bronze medal – third place	2013 Santiago	

The Uruguay women's national field hockey team represents Uruguay in women's international field hockey competitions. It is controlled by the Federación Uruguaya de Hockey Sobre Césped.

== History ==
Field hockey in Uruguay is traditionally a sport played by the middle and upper-class, with most playing activity among private schools in the capital city, Montevideo. In 1999, the Uruguayan Olympic Committee constructed the first synthetic hockey field in the country.

To ensure better player retention, an U17 team was created in 2002. By 2003, efforts were underway to introduce the sport to more state schools.

== Tournament history ==
=== Pan American Games ===
- 2003 – (bronze)
- 2007 – 7th place
- 2015 – 5th place
- 2019 – 5th place
- 2023 – 5th place

=== Pan American Cup ===
- 2001 – 4th place
- 2004 – 4th place
- 2013 – 6th place
- 2017 – 5th place
- 2022 – 5th place
- 2025 – (bronze)

=== South American Games ===
- 2006 – (bronze)
- 2014 – (bronze)
- 2018 – (silver)
- 2022 – (bronze)
- 2026 – (bronze)

=== South American Championship ===
- 2003 – (bronze)
- 2008 – (bronze)
- 2010 – (bronze)
- 2013 – (bronze)
- 2016 – (gold)

=== Pan American Challenge ===
- 2011 – (gold)

=== Hockey World League ===
- 2012–13 – 21st place
- 2014–15 – 19th place
- 2016–17 – 23rd place

=== FIH Hockey Series ===
- 2018–19 – Second round

=== Hockey Nations Cup ===
- 2025–26 – 8th place

=== Hockey Nations Cup 2 ===
- 2024–25 – (silver)

=== Current squad ===
The following players were called to compete in the world cup quialifiers rom 8 to 14 March in Hyderabad, India.

Players, caps and goals updated as of 8 March 2026.

Head coach: Rolando Rivero

No.	Pos.	Player	Date of birth (age)	Caps	Goals	Club
6	GK	Martina Miranda	10 July 2003 (age 23)	0		(Royal Spanish Football Federation) Real Sociedad
32	GK	María Bate	11 July 2000 (age 26)	22		(Uruguayan Football Association) Old Girls Club
2	DF	Florencia Peñalba	9 September 1999 (age 27)	29	0	(Uruguayan Football Association) Carrasco
7	DF	Martina Rago	16 April 2001 (age 25)	7	0	(Uruguayan Football Association) Biguá
19	DF	Belén Barreiro	1 April 2004 (age 22)	27	3	(Uruguayan Football Association) Old Ivy
20	DF	Chiara Curcio	28 February 2006 (age 20)	5	0	(Uruguayan Football Association) Old Girls Club
22	DF	Lucía Olascoaga	9 May 2003 (age 23)	0	0	(Argentine Football Association) San Cirano
3	MF	Manuela Vilar del Valle	25 March 1994 (age 32)	104	86	(Royal Belgian Football Association) Dragons
4	MF	Elisa Civetta	2 January 2003 (age 23)	17	1	(Uruguayan Football Association) Old Girls Club
10	MF	Manuela Quiñones	2 April 2001 (age 25)	17	5	(Uruguayan Football Association) Old Sampa Club
11	MF	Magdalena Gómez	14 February 1996 (age 30)	26	2	(Argentine Football Association) San Lorenzo
13	MF	Lupe Curutchague	5 June 2003 (age 23)	22	3	(Royal Belgian Football Association) Royal Victory HC
16	MF	Clementina Cristiani	10 June 1999 (age 27)	25	2	(Uruguayan Football Association) Old Sampa Club
23	MF	Jacinta Curutchague	9 May 2005 (age 21)	0	0	(Uruguayan Football Association) Náutico
8	FW	Magdalena Verga	24 July 2000 (age 26)	0	0	(Uruguayan Football Association) Carrasco
14	FW	Paula Pérez	30 September 2003 (age 22)	0	0	(Uruguayan Football Association) Old Girls Club
15	FW	Agustina Martínez	23 January 2000 (age 26)	10	0	(Royal Belgian Football Association) Royal Victory HC
17	FW	Teresa Viana	26 March 1993 (age 33)	68	69	(Royal Spanish Football Federation) Sanse Complutense
18	FW	Agustina Díaz	7 November 2003 (age 22)	5	1	(Royal Spanish Football Federation) Real Sociedad
31	FW	María Eugenia Rodríguez	25 December 2006 (age 19)	0	0	(Uruguayan Football Association) Náutico

== Results and fixtures ==
The following is a list of match results in the last 12 months, as well as any future matches that have been scheduled.

Win Draw Loss Fixture

=== 2026 ===
==== 2026 Women's FIH World Cup Qualifiers ====
8 March 2026 Pool B	India	4–0	Uruguay	Hyderabad, India
19:30	Annu 21'; Ishika 40'; Lalremsiami 49'; Rutuja 58'	Report		Stadium: G. M. C. Balayogi Hockey Ground

9 March 2026 Pool B	Uruguay	3–2	Wales	Hyderabad, India
17:15	Vilar 29'; Díaz 36'; Viana 41'	Report	Atkin 5'; Goodwin 48'	Stadium: G. M. C. Balayogi Hockey Ground

11 March 2026 Pool B	Uruguay	1–3	Scotland	Hyderabad, India
17:15	Verga 19'	Report	Eadie 10'; Holdgate 43', 58'	Stadium: G. M. C. Balayogi Hockey Ground

13 March 2026 5/8 Classification	Uruguay	3–0	Austria	Hyderabad, India
15:00	Vilar 4'; Viana 21', 44'	Report		Stadium: G. M. C. Balayogi Hockey Ground

14 March 2026 5/6 Classification	Wales	0–3	Uruguay	Hyderabad, India
15:00		Report	Viana 23'; Verga 36'; Curutchague 57'	Stadium: G. M. C. Balayogi Hockey Ground

==== 2026 FIH Nations Cup ====
15 June Pool A	Japan	3–1	Uruguay	Auckland, New Zealand
13:00	Toriyama 1'; Suzuki 30+'; Hasegawa 60'	Report	Curutchague 3'	Stadium: National Hockey Centre

16 June Pool A	United States	7–2	Uruguay	Auckland, New Zealand
10:45	Sessa 3'; Tamer 8', 17', 41', 47'; Yeager 12'; Heck 30'	Report	Curutchague 4'; Vilar 38'	Stadium: National Hockey Centre

18 June Pool A	India	3–2	Uruguay	Auckland, New Zealand
10:45	Deepika 24', 56'; Soreng 43'	Report	Appennino 13'; Vilar 55'	Stadium: National Hockey Centre

20 June 5/8 Classification	South Korea	2–1	Uruguay	Auckland, New Zealand
13:30	Jeong-ihn 18'; S. Park 55'	Report	Vilar 51'	Stadium: North Harbour Hockey Stadium

21 June 7/8 Classification	France	3–0	Uruguay	Auckland, New Zealand
11:00	Zanden 2'; Rimbert 43'; Duffrène 55'	Report		Stadium: North Harbour Hockey Stadium

==== 2026 South American Games ====
13 September 2026 Pool A	Uruguay	12–0	Peru	Santa Fe, Argentina
13:00	Vilar 1', 4', 28', 39', 40'; Cristiani 1'; Rago 15'; Díaz 22', 25', 32'; Quinones 34', 55'	Report		Stadium: Estadio Asociacion Santafesina de Hockey

15 September 2026 Pool A	Uruguay	0–5	Argentina	Santa Fe, Argentina
14:00		Report	Andrade 15'; Palacio 29'; Alastra 45', 45'; Díaz 51'	Stadium: Estadio Asociacion Santafesina de Hockey

19 September 2026 Pool A	Paraguay	0–13	Uruguay	Santa Fe, Argentina
10:00		Report	Vilar 8'; Luis 9'; Díaz 20', 34'; Cristiani 23'; J. Curutchague 27'; Rago 28'; Seigal 30'; Rodriguez 36', 48', 49', 51'; Barreiro 54'	Stadium: Estadio Asociacion Santafesina de Hockey

20 September 2026 Pool A	Uruguay	0–0	Chile	Santa Fe, Argentina
10:00		Report		Stadium: Estadio Asociacion Santafesina de Hockey

22 September 2026 Bronze medal match	Uruguay	9–0	Paraguay	Santa Fe, Argentina
11:15	Vilar 8', 26', 45'; Cristiani 12'; Seigal 22'; J. Curutchague 28'; Quinones 33', 35'; L. Curutchague 39'	Report		Stadium: Estadio Asociacion Santafesina de Hockey

== Squad records in official competitions ==
=== 2020-Present ===
Jersey #	Competitions							
Jersey #	2022		2023	2025		2026		
Jersey #	PAC	SAG	PAG	NC2	PAC	WCQ	NC	SAG
1				Montans				
2	Peñalba							Peñalba
3			Taborda	Rago	Vilar del Valle			
4	Dall'Orso		Civetta					
5	Oliveros			Oliveros				Oliveros
6			de María			Martínez M.		
7	Barrandeguy C.			Martínez A.	Barrandeguy C.	Rago		
8	León				Dall'Orso	Verga		
9	Algorta							
10	Vilar del Valle				Quiñones			
11	Amadeo					Gómez		Gómez
12	Balarini	Alles					Alles	
13		Curutchague L.						
14		Gómez				Pérez		
15	García				Martínez A.			
16	Mutilva				Cristiani			
17	Viana							
18	Carvalho				Díaz			
19	Barreiro							
20		Vidal			Curcio			
21	Esposto							
22						Olascoaga		
23	Serra					Curutchague J.		
24					Montans			
25				Barrandeguy M.				
27			Quiñones					Luis
28		Dall'Orso					Martínez S.	
30					Seigal		Seigal	
31						Rodríguez		Rodríguez
32		Bate						
38							Arregui	
43							Delafond	
45							Burgos	
46							Mari	
51							Appennino	
HC	Nicolás Tixe		Rolando Rivero					
Result	5th	3rd place, bronze medalist(s)	5th	2nd place, silver medalist(s)	3rd place, bronze medalist(s)	5th	8th	Qualified

== See also ==
- Uruguay men's national field hockey team
