= Carolina García (field hockey) =

Chilean field hockey player (b. 1985)

Personal information
- Full name: Carolina Andrea García Leon
- Born: 21 March 1985 (age 41) Chile

Sport
- Sport: Field hockey
- Position: Attacker
National team
Years	Team	Caps	Goals
2003–	Chile	224	-
Medal record
Women's field hockey
Representing Chile
Pan American Games
Bronze medal – third place	2011 Guadalajara	Team
Pan American Cup
Silver medal – second place	2017 Lancaster	Team
South American Games
Silver medal – second place	2006 Buenos Aires	Team

Carolina García (born 21 March 1985) is a Chilean field hockey player.

== Career ==
=== Junior National Team ===
García first represented the Chile Under 21 team in 2005, at the Pan-American Junior Championships in San Juan, Puerto Rico. At the tournament, García finished as highest goalscorer with 11 goals, helping Chile to third place.

Again in 2005, García represented the Chile junior team at the Junior World Cup in Santiago, Chile, where the team finished in 10th place.

=== Senior National Team ===
García debuted for the senior national team in 2003. Her first major tournament with the team was the 2003 Pan American Games.

Since her debut, García has been a regular inclusion in the national team, earning medals at one South American Games, one Pan American Cup and one Pan American Games.

García's most recent appearance for Chile was at the 2018–19 Hockey Series Open held in Santiago, Chile.
