= Women's South American Hockey Championship =

Field hockey tournament

- Most recent season or competition: 2016 Women's South American Hockey Championship
- Sport: Field hockey
- Founded: 2003; 23 years ago
- Most recent champion: Uruguay (1st title)
- Most titles: Argentina (4 titles)
- Related competitions: South American Games

The Women's South American Hockey Championship is together with the field hockey event at the South American Games the official competition for senior women's national field hockey teams of South America. The tournament is held every four years and every two years when there is no field hockey at the South American Games. In 2016 the tournament also was a 2016–17 Women's FIH Hockey World League Round 1 event.

== Results ==
=== Summaries ===
Year	Host	Final			Third place match		
Year	Host	Winner	Score	Runner-up	Third place	Score	Fourth place
2003; Details	Santiago, Chile	Argentina	Round-robin	Chile	Uruguay	Round-robin	Paraguay
2008; Details	Montevideo, Uruguay	Argentina	5–1	Chile	Uruguay	2–0	Brazil
2010; Details	Rio de Janeiro, Brazil	Argentina	4–0	Chile	Uruguay	5–0	Brazil
2013; Details	Santiago, Chile	Argentina	4–0	Chile	Uruguay	4–1	Brazil
2016; Details	Chiclayo, Peru	Uruguay	Round-robin	Chile	Brazil	Round-robin	Paraguay
2021; Details	Lima, Peru	Cancelled			Cancelled		

=== Medal table ===
Rank	Nation	Gold	Silver	Bronze	Total
1	Argentina	4	0	0	4
2	Uruguay	1	0	4	5
3	Chile	0	5	0	5
4	Brazil	0	0	1	1
Totals (4 entries)		5	5	5	15

=== Team appearances ===
Nation	(Chile) 2003	(Uruguay) 2008	(Brazil) 2010	(Chile) 2013	(Peru) 2016	Total
Argentina	1st	1st	1st	1st	–	4
Brazil	–	4th	4th	4th	3rd	4
Chile	2nd	2nd	2nd	2nd	2nd	5
Paraguay	4th	6th	5th	5th	4th	5
Peru	5th	–	–	6th	5th	4
Uruguay	3rd	3rd	3rd	3rd	1st	5
Venezuela	–	5th	6th	–	–	2
Total	5	6	6	6	5	Source

== See also ==
- Men's South American Hockey Championship
- Field hockey at the South American Games
