= Argentina women's national field hockey team =

Olympic field hockey team

Argentina
- Nickname(s): Las Leonas (The Lionesses)
- Association: Confederación Argentina de Hockey (CAH)
- Confederation: PAHF (Americas)
- Head Coach: Fernando Ferrara
- Assistant coach(es): Ignacio Bergner; Santiago Capurro; Fernando Fioroni; Jorge Talia
- Manager: Martín Elli
- Captain: Agostina Alonso; María José Granatto
- Most caps: Luciana Aymar (376)
- Top scorer: Noel Barrionuevo (185)
Home	Away

FIH ranking
- Current: 2 (3 October 2026)
- Highest: 1st (2003 – 2010 – 2011)
- Lowest: 4 (2018)

Olympic Games
- Appearances: 9 (first in 1988)
- Best result: (silver) 2nd (2000, 2012, 2020)

World Cup
- Appearances: 16 (first in 1974)
- Best result: (gold) 1st (2002, 2010, 2026)

Pan American Games
- Appearances: 9 (first in 1987)
- Best result: 1st (1987, 1991, 1995, 1999, 2003, 2007, 2019, 2023)

Pan American Cup
- Appearances: 7 (first in 2001)
- Best result: 1st (2001, 2004, 2009, 2013, 2017, 2022, 2025)
Medal record
Olympic Games
Silver medal – second place	2000 Sydney	Team
Silver medal – second place	2012 London	Team
Silver medal – second place	2020 Tokyo	Team
Bronze medal – third place	2004 Athens	Team
Bronze medal – third place	2008 Beijing	Team
Bronze medal – third place	2024 Paris	Team
World Cup
Gold medal – first place	2002 Perth
Gold medal – first place	2010 Rosario
Gold medal – first place	2026 Wavre/Amstelveen
Silver medal – second place	1974 Mandelieu
Silver medal – second place	1976 West Berlin
Silver medal – second place	1994 Dublin
Silver medal – second place	2022 Terrassa-Amstelveen
Bronze medal – third place	1978 Madrid
Bronze medal – third place	2006 Madrid
Bronze medal – third place	2014 The Hague
Pan American Cup
Gold medal – first place	2001 Kingston
Gold medal – first place	2004 Bridgetown
Gold medal – first place	2009 Hamilton
Gold medal – first place	2013 Mendoza
Gold medal – first place	2017 Lancaster
Gold medal – first place	2022 Santiago
Gold medal – first place	2025 Montevideo
Champions Trophy
Gold medal – first place	2001 Amstelveen
Gold medal – first place	2008 Mönchengladbach
Gold medal – first place	2009 Sydney
Gold medal – first place	2010 Nottingham
Gold medal – first place	2012 Rosario
Gold medal – first place	2014 Mendoza
Gold medal – first place	2016 London
Silver medal – second place	2002 Macau
Silver medal – second place	2007 Quilmes
Silver medal – second place	2011 Amsterdam
Bronze medal – third place	2004 Rosario
Bronze medal – third place	2018 Changzhou
World League
Gold medal – first place	2014–15 Rosario

The Argentina women's national field hockey team (Spanish: Selección femenina de hockey sobre césped de Argentina) is governed by the Argentine Hockey Confederation (CAH). The current coach is Fernando Ferrara, who was appointed after Carlos Retegui was let go in late 2021. The team is currently second in the FIH Women's World Ranking.

Las Leonas (The Lionesses) have appeared in six Hockey World Cup finals, including the first final in 1974, which they lost 1–0 to the Netherlands. Argentina had to settle with second place in two more finals before winning the tournament for the first time in 2002, beating the Netherlands 4–3 in the final on penalty strokes after a 1–1 draw. Argentina, led by eight-time FIH Player of the Year Luciana Aymar won again in 2010, a 3–1 victory over the Netherlands. Argentina's World Cup-winning coaches are Sergio Vigil in 2002 and Carlos Retegui in 2010.

Argentina has been very successful at the Summer Olympics, winning four consecutive medals (two silver, two bronze) since the 2000 edition, when they became the first women's team in any sport to win an Olympic medal for their country. Luciana Aymar is the only player that has participated and won those four medals. Also, after their first title in 2001 at a Hockey Champions Trophy, they have won the tournament six more times. In front of a home crowd, they won the 2014–15 Hockey World League as the first international title after Aymar's retirement from the national team the previous year.

At a continental level, Argentina has dominated and won every tournament they played, including the Pan American Cup and the Pan American Games leaving the United States with second place on most events until they lost the 2011 Pan American Games final for the first time.

In July 2003, after the implementation of an official World Ranking System, Argentina reached the top of the FIH Women's World Ranking for the first time, reaching it again in 2010 after obtaining the World Cup title and once more in late 2013.

== History ==
Hockey was introduced in Argentina by English immigrants at the beginning of the 20th century, and the first women's teams were officially formed in 1909. In 1997, Sergio Vigil, a former player for the men's national team, was appointed coach. Under his leadership, Las Leonas achieved their first World Hockey Cup title, their first Olympic medals, their first Champions Trophy medals, and many other achievements. The team went from having a rather limited audience to becoming a national sensation, with some of the players even appearing as models in advertising campaigns.

=== Nickname ===
Throughout its history, the team has developed a reputation for being tenacious even when a match appears to be lost. For this reason, a lioness was chosen as their symbol when the team qualified for the 2000 Summer Olympics. During the second round of games, Argentina played against the powerful Dutch team, and they chose this occasion to place the image of a lioness on their shirts for the first time.

The image was designed by then-player Inés Arrondo together with Vigil's sister-in-law. Argentina won that match, went on to win the silver medal, and Las Leonas were born. Subsequently, the junior (under 21) team is called Las Leoncitas ("the baby lionesses" or "the lioness cubs").

The lioness logo was redesigned in 2006 by the team kit supplier, Adidas, along with Confederación Argentina de Hockey and even some of the most representative players. This is slightly different from the original, showing the lioness' tail pretending to be a hockey stick while holding a ball.

The nickname also falls in line with an unwritten Argentine tradition of naming national teams after big cats: the men's field hockey team is called Los Leones ("The Lions"), the men's rugby union team is called Los Pumas ("The Pumas"), and the women's volleyball team is known as Las Panteras ("The Panthers").

== Tournament records ==
World Cup
Year	Host city	Position
1974	Mandelieu, France	2nd
1976	Berlin, West Germany	2nd
1978	Madrid, Spain	3rd
1981	Buenos Aires, Argentina	6th
1983	Kuala Lumpur, Malaysia	9th
1986	Amsterdam, Netherlands	7th
1990	Sydney, Australia	9th
1994	(Republic of Ireland) Dublin, Ireland	2nd
1998	Utrecht, Netherlands	4th
2002	Perth, Australia	1st
2006	Madrid, Spain	3rd
2010	Rosario, Argentina	1st
2014	The Hague, Netherlands	3rd
2018	London, England	7th
2022	Terrassa, Spain; Amstelveen, Netherlands	2nd
2026	Wavre, Belgium; Amstelveen, Netherlands	1st

Pan American Cup
Year	Host city	Position
2001	Kingston, Jamaica	1st
2004	Bridgetown, Barbados	1st
2009	Hamilton, Bermuda	1st
2013	Mendoza, Argentina	1st
2017	Lancaster, United States	1st
2022	Santiago, Chile	1st
2025	Montevideo, Uruguay	1st

South American Championship
Year	Host city	Position
2003	Santiago, Chile	1st
2008	Montevideo, Uruguay	1st
2010	Rio de Janeiro, Brazil	1st
2013	Santiago, Chile	1st

Olympic Games
Year	Host city	Position
1980	Moscow, Soviet Union	N/A
1988	Seoul, South Korea	7th
1996	Atlanta, United States	7th
2000	Sydney, Australia	2nd
2004	Athens, Greece	3rd
2008	Beijing, China	3rd
2012	London, United Kingdom	2nd
2016	Rio de Janeiro, Brazil	7th
2020	Tokyo, Japan	2nd
2024	Paris, France	3rd

Pan American Games
Year	Host city	Position
1987	Indianapolis, United States	1st
1991	Havana, Cuba	1st
1995	Mar del Plata, Argentina	1st
1999	Winnipeg, Canada	1st
2003	Santo Domingo, Dominican Republic	1st
2007	Rio de Janeiro, Brazil	1st
2011	Guadalajara, Mexico	2nd
2015	Toronto, Canada	2nd
2019	Lima, Peru	1st
2023	Santiago, Chile	1st
2027	Lima, Peru	Qualified

South American Games
Year	Host city	Position
2006	Buenos Aires, Argentina	1st
2014	Santiago, Chile	1st
2018	Cochabamba, Bolivia	1st
2022	Asunción, Paraguay	2nd
2026	Santa Fe, Argentina	1st

Pro League
Year	Final host city	Position
2019	Amstelveen, Netherlands	4th
2020–21	N/A	2nd
2021–22	N/A	1st
2022–23	N/A	2nd
2023–24	N/A	3rd
2024–25	N/A	2nd
2025–26	N/A	2nd
2026–27	N/A	Qualified

World League
Year	Final host city	Position
2012–13	San Miguel de Tucumán, Argentina	4th
2014–15	Rosario, Argentina	1st
2016–17	Auckland, New Zealand	5th

Champions Trophy
Year	Host city	Position
1995	Mar del Plata, Argentina	6th
1999	Brisbane, Australia	4th
2000	Amstelveen, Netherlands	4th
2001	Amstelveen, Netherlands	1st
2002	Macau, China	2nd
2003	Sydney, Australia	4th
2004	Rosario, Argentina	3rd
2005	Canberra, Australia	4th
2006	Amstelveen, Netherlands	4th
2007	Quilmes, Argentina	2nd
2008	Mönchengladbach, Germany	1st
2009	Sydney, Australia	1st
2010	Nottingham, England	1st
2011	Amstelveen, Netherlands	2nd
2012	Rosario, Argentina	1st
2014	Mendoza, Argentina	1st
2016	London, United Kingdom	1st
2018	Changzhou, China	3rd

== Players ==
=== Current squad ===
The following players were called by both Fernando Ferrara and Juan Martín López to compete at the South American Games between 13 and 22 September in Santa Fe, Argentina.

Players, caps and goals updated as of 22 September 2026.

Head coach: Juan Martín López

No.	Pos.	Player	Date of birth (age)	Caps	Goals	Club
15	GK	Ana Luz Dodorico	6 January 2000 (age 26)	4		(Argentine Football Association) GEBA
40	GK	Mercedes Artola	16 January 2006 (age 20)	11		(Argentine Football Association) River Plate
38	DF	Chiara Ambrosini	2 November 2006 (age 19)}	19	4	(Argentine Football Association) Ferro
43	DF	Emma Knobl	27 October 2005 (age 20)	16	0	(Argentine Football Association) Lomas
55	DF	Pilar Pishtón	4 August 2004 (age 22)	5	0	(Argentine Football Association) Banco Nación
64	DF	Milagros Alastra	22 August 2006 (age 20)	18	7	(Argentine Football Association) GEBA
20	MF	Sofía Cairó	8 October 2002 (age 24)	76	7	(Argentine Football Association) Mariano Moreno
26	MF	Sol Pagella	26 February 2002 (age 24)	5	1	(Argentine Football Association) San Fernando
36	MF	Pilar Palacio	25 June 2003 (age 23)	5	4	(Argentine Football Association) River Plate
42	MF	Victoria Falasco	1 April 2004 (age 22)	23	4	(Argentine Football Association) GEBA
45	MF	Catalina Andrade	7 February 2002 (age 24)	32	10	(Argentine Football Association) Italiano
23	FW	Lara Casas	22 June 2004 (age 22)	40	11	(Argentine Football Association) Italiano
28	FW	Daiana Pacheco	4 April 2002 (age 24)	11	2	(Argentine Football Association) Urú Curé
30	FW	Paula Santamarina	27 August 2002 (age 24)	2	0	(Argentine Football Association) River Plate
33	FW	Zoe Díaz	5 June 2006 (age 20)	57	17	(Argentine Football Association) Italiano
46	FW	Lourdes Pisthón	27 December 2007 (age 18)	19	9	(Argentine Football Association) Banco Nación
49	FW	Sol Guignet	11 August 2004 (age 22)	5	0	(Argentine Football Association) GEBA
60	FW	Brisa Bruggesser	25 July 2002 (age 24)	43	16	(Argentine Football Association) Ciudad

=== Recent call-ups ===
These players were called up in the last 12 months.

Pos.	Player	Date of birth (age)	Caps	Goals	Club	Latest call-up
GK	Cristina Cosentino	22 December 1997 (age 28)	87		(Argentina) Banco Nación	29 August 2026, v. Netherlands
GK	Lourdes Pérez Iturraspe	16 February 2000 (age 26)	0		(Argentina) SIC	Never played an official match
DF	Sofía Toccalino	20 March 1997 (age 29)	221	19	(Argentina) St. Catherine's	29 August 2026, v. Netherlands
DF	Agustina Gorzelany	11 March 1996 (age 30)	166	116	(Argentina) San Martín	29 August 2026, v. Netherlands
DF	Valentina Raposo	28 January 2003 (age 23)	102	11	(Argentina) Popeye Rugby Club	29 August 2026, v. Netherlands
DF	Valentina Costa Biondi	13 September 1995 (age 31)	95	9	(Argentina) San Fernando	13 December 2025, v. Germany
DF	Juana Castellaro	29 March 2005 (age 21)	65	2	(Argentina) River Plate	29 August 2026, v. Netherlands
DF	Sol Lombardo	10 March 1999 (age 27)	18	0	(Argentina) Italiano	11 December 2025, v. Netherlands
DF	Valentina Ferola	24 September 2003 (age 23)	3	0	(Argentina) Italiano	11 December 2025, v. Netherlands
MF	Eugenia Trinchinetti	17 July 1997 (age 29)	229	56	(Argentina) San Fernando	29 August 2026, v. Netherlands
MF	Agostina Alonso	1 October 1995 (age 31)	204	8	(Argentina) Banco Nación	29 August 2026, v. Netherlands
MF	Victoria Sauze	21 July 1991 (age 35)	177	7	(Argentina) San Lorenzo	29 August 2026, v. Netherlands
MF	Paula Ortiz	16 April 1997 (age 29)	106	15	(Argentina) San Martín	27 August 2026, v. Australia
MF	Victoria Miranda	5 June 2000 (age 26)	58	3	(Argentina) Ciudad	29 August 2026, v. Netherlands
MF	Julieta Arcidiácono	6 April 2001 (age 25)	2	0	(Argentina) Banco Provincia	10 December 2025, v. Germany
MF	Candela Esandi	8 August 2001 (age 25)	1	0	(Argentina) San Fernando	13 December 2025, v. Germany
MF	Sol Olalla	16 January 2005 (age 21)	0	0	(Argentina) Italiano	Never played an official match
FW	María José Granatto	21 April 1995 (age 31)	261	149	(Argentina) Santa Bárbara	29 August 2026, v. Netherlands
FW	Julieta Jankunas	20 January 1999 (age 27)	219	121	(Argentina) Hacoaj	29 August 2026, v. Netherlands
FW	Victoria Granatto	9 April 1991 (age 35)	87	22	(Argentina) Santa Bárbara	29 August 2026, v. Netherlands
FW	Emilia Larsen	12 April 2002 (age 24)	6	1	(Argentina) Club Atlético Monte Hermoso	11 December 2025, v. Netherlands
FW	Catalina Alimenti	30 December 2002 (age 23)	3	0	(Argentina) GEBA	13 December 2025, v. Germany
FW	Aylín Ovejero	23 July 2003 (age 23)	2	0	(Argentina) Lomas	13 December 2025, v. Germany

=== Notable past players ===
- Magdalena Aicega (1993–2008)
- Laura Aladro (2005–16)
- Agustina Albertario (2011–25)
- Mariela Antoniska (1994–2006)
- Inés Arrondo (1997–2004)
- Luciana Aymar (1998–2014)
- Noel Barrionuevo (2006–21)
- Jimena Cedrés
- Laura del Colle
- Silvina D'Elía (2006-15, 2019-20)
- Natalí Doreski
- María Paz Ferrari
- Andrea Fioroni
- Anabel Gambero
- Soledad García (1999–2011)
- Mariana González Oliva
- Alejandra Gulla (1998–2010)
- Agustina Habif (2014-19)
- Florencia Habif (2011–19)
- María de la Paz Hernández
- Giselle Kañevsky (2006–11, 2019–?)
- Gabriela Liz
- Marisa López
- Rosario Luchetti (2005–15, 2019–?)
- Sofía MacKenzie
- Laura Maiztegui
- Mercedes Margalot (1997–2012)
- Karina Masotta (1987–2003)
- Delfina Merino (2009–22)
- Laura Mulhall
- Vanina Oneto (1991–2004)
- Gabriela Pando (1989–98)
- María Gabriela Pazos
- Carla Rebecchi (2004–20)
- Jorgelina Rimoldi (1991–2001)
- Macarena Rodríguez
- María Cecilia Rognoni (1994–2005)
- Mariana Rossi
- Mariné Russo
- Rocío Sánchez Moccia (2007–24)
- Mariela Scarone
- Daniela Sruoga
- Josefina Sruoga
- Ayelén Stepnik (1993–2010)
- Belén Succi (2006–22)
- María Alejandra Tucat
- Lucina von der Heyde (2016–19, 2022)
- Paola Vukojicic
- Victoria Zuloaga

=== Not in use jersey numbers ===
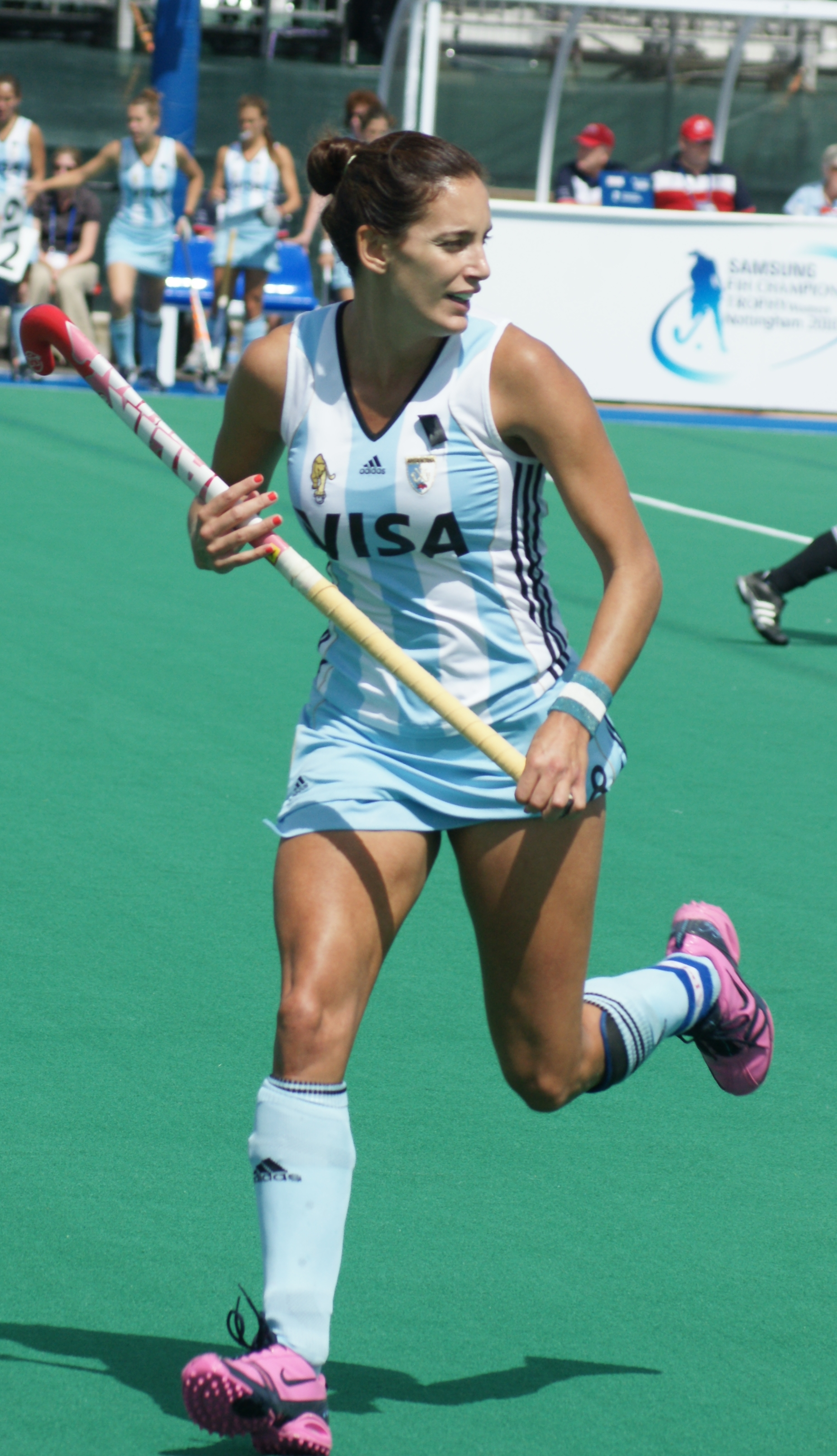
Luciana Aymar, eight-time FIH Player of the Year Award, considered as the best female hockey player of all time

When Luciana Aymar (eight-time FIH Player of the Year Award winner and regarded as the best player in the history of the sport), retired from the national team in 2014 after 376 international matches played, some of Aymar's teammates (such as Carla Rebecchi) asked the Confederation for the retirement of her iconic number 8 worn by her during 17 years with the national team. Nevertheless, the number is not officially retired by the CAH, although it has not been assigned to other players since.

=== Captains ===
Period	Captain	Vice-captain
1997–2002	Karina Masotta	Magdalena Aicega
2003–2005	Magdalena Aicega	Cecilia Rognoni
2006–2008	Magdalena Aicega	Luciana Aymar
2009–2014	Luciana Aymar	Rosario Luchetti
2014–2015	Macarena Rodríguez	Carla Rebecchi
2015–2017	Carla Rebecchi	Belén Succi
2017–2019	Belén Succi	Delfina Merino
2019–2020	Rosario Luchetti	Silvina D'Elía; Carla Rebecchi
2021	Noel Barrionuevo	Delfina Merino
2022	Agostina Alonso; ~~Delfina Merino~~; Rocío Sánchez Moccia; Victoria Sauze	
2023–2024	Agostina Alonso; María José Granatto; Rocío Sánchez Moccia; Victoria Sauze	
2024–Present	Agostina Alonso; María José Granatto	

== Coaches ==
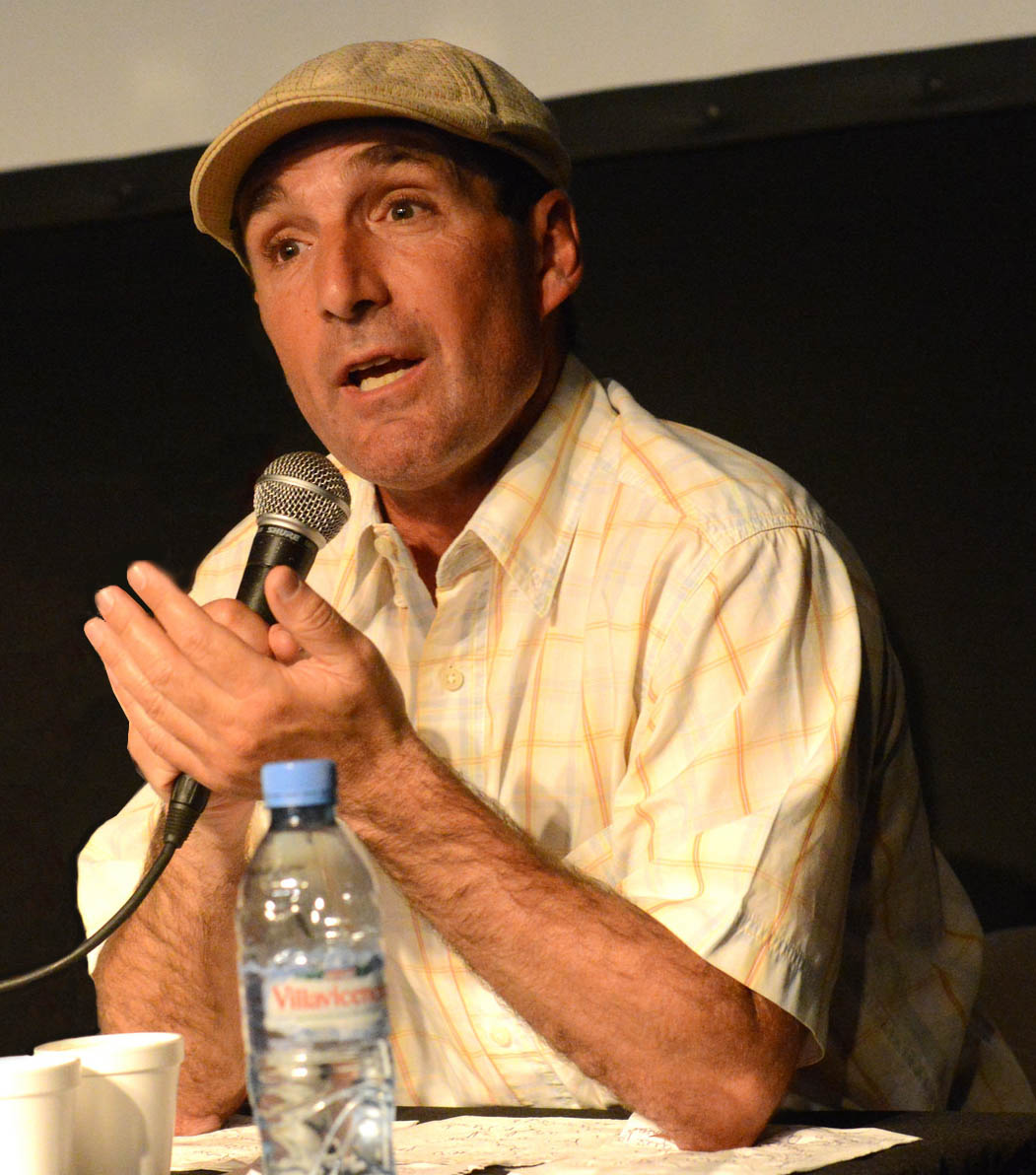
Sergio Vigil, with whom Las Leonas won 7 titles and 2 Olympic medals

Period	Name
1986–1991	Miguel MacCormik
1991–1997	Rodolfo Mendoza
1997–2004	Sergio Vigil
2004–2009	Gabriel Minadeo
2009–2012	Carlos Retegui
2012–2013	Marcelo Garraffo
2013	Emanuel Roggero
2013–2014	Carlos Retegui (2nd cycle)
2014–2015	Santiago Capurro
2015–2017	Gabriel Minadeo (2nd cycle)
2017–2018	Agustín Corradini
2018–2021	Carlos Retegui (3rd cycle)
2021–present	Fernando Ferrara

== Honours ==
Since its breakthrough in the 2000 Summer Olympics (where the team nicknamed "Las Leonas"' for the first time), Argentina has won more than 20 official titles, which are detailed below:

- Summer Olympics:
  - (silver) Silver medal: Sydney 2000, London 2012, Tokyo 2020
  - (bronze) Bronze medal: Athens 2004, Beijing 2008, Paris 2024
- (gold) World Cup: 2002, 2010, 2026
- (gold) FIH Pro League: 2021–22
- (gold) FIH Hockey World League: 2014–15
- (gold) Champions Trophy: 2001, 2008, 2009, 2010, 2012, 2014, 2016
- (gold) Pan American Cup: 2001, 2004, 2009, 2013, 2017, 2022, 2025
- (gold) Pan American Games: 1987, 1991, 1995, 1999, 2003, 2007, 2019, 2023
- (gold) South American Championship: 2003, 2008, 2010, 2013
- (gold) South American Games: 2006, 2014, 2018, 2026

== Gallery ==
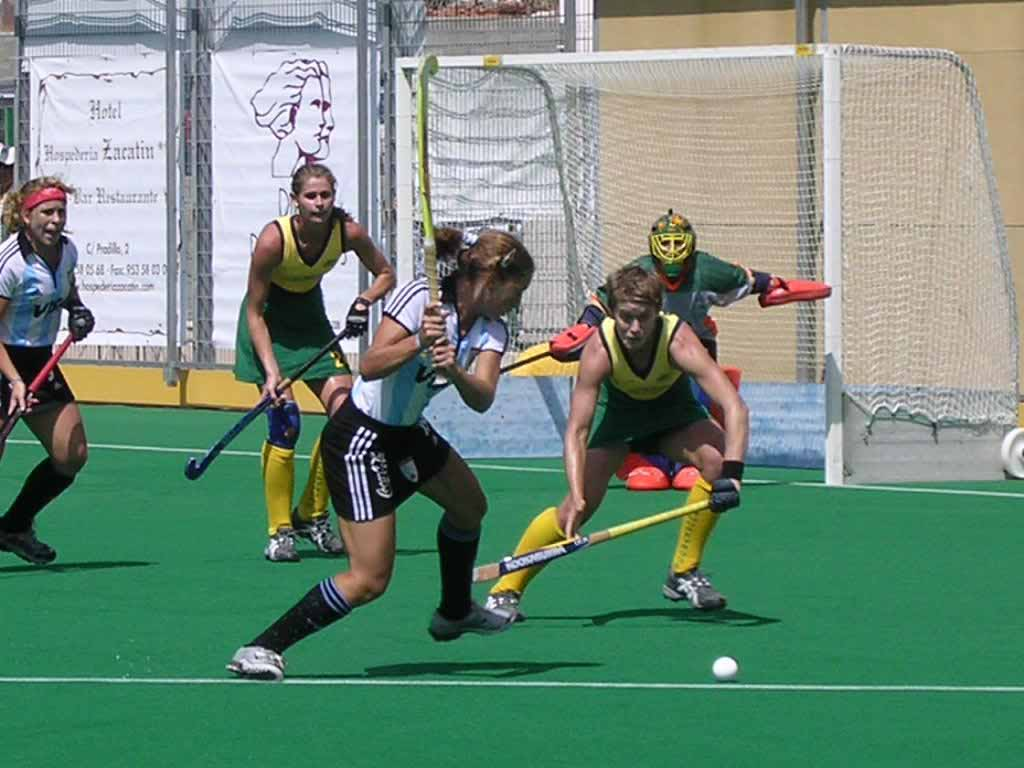
Mariné Russo in a match against Australia in 2005

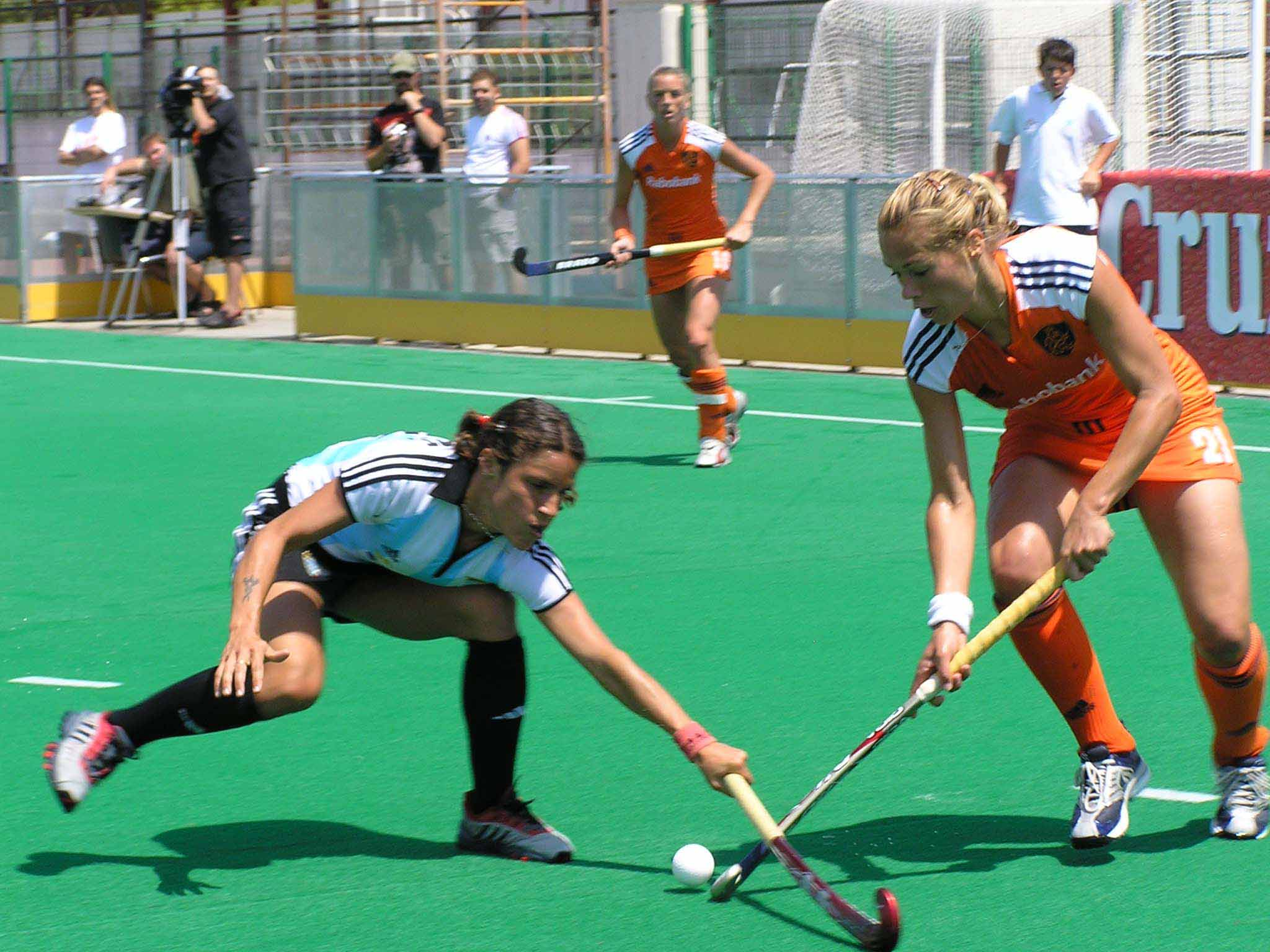
Mercedes Margalot in a match against Nederlands in 2005

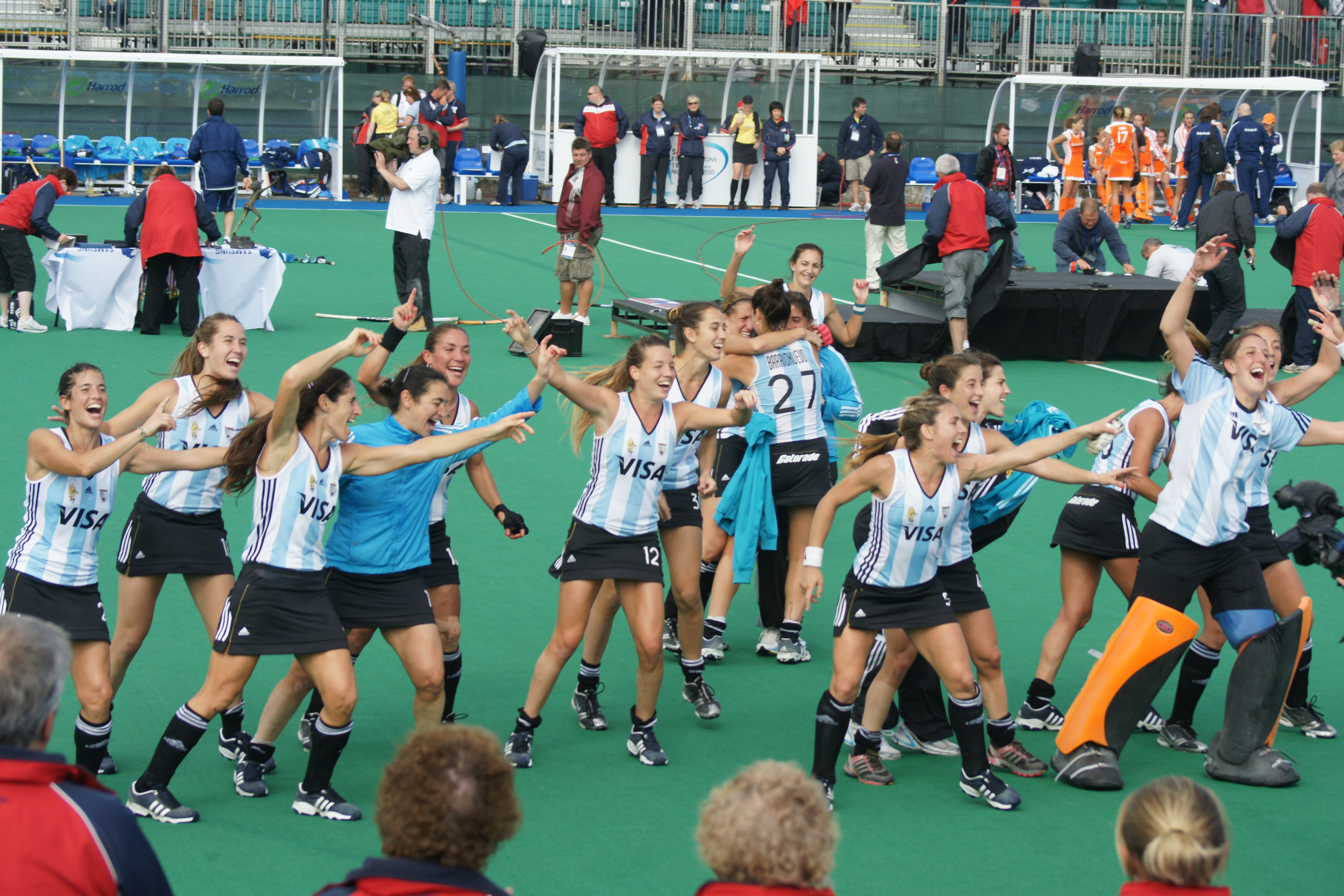
Celebrating their win after the 2010 Champions Trophy final.

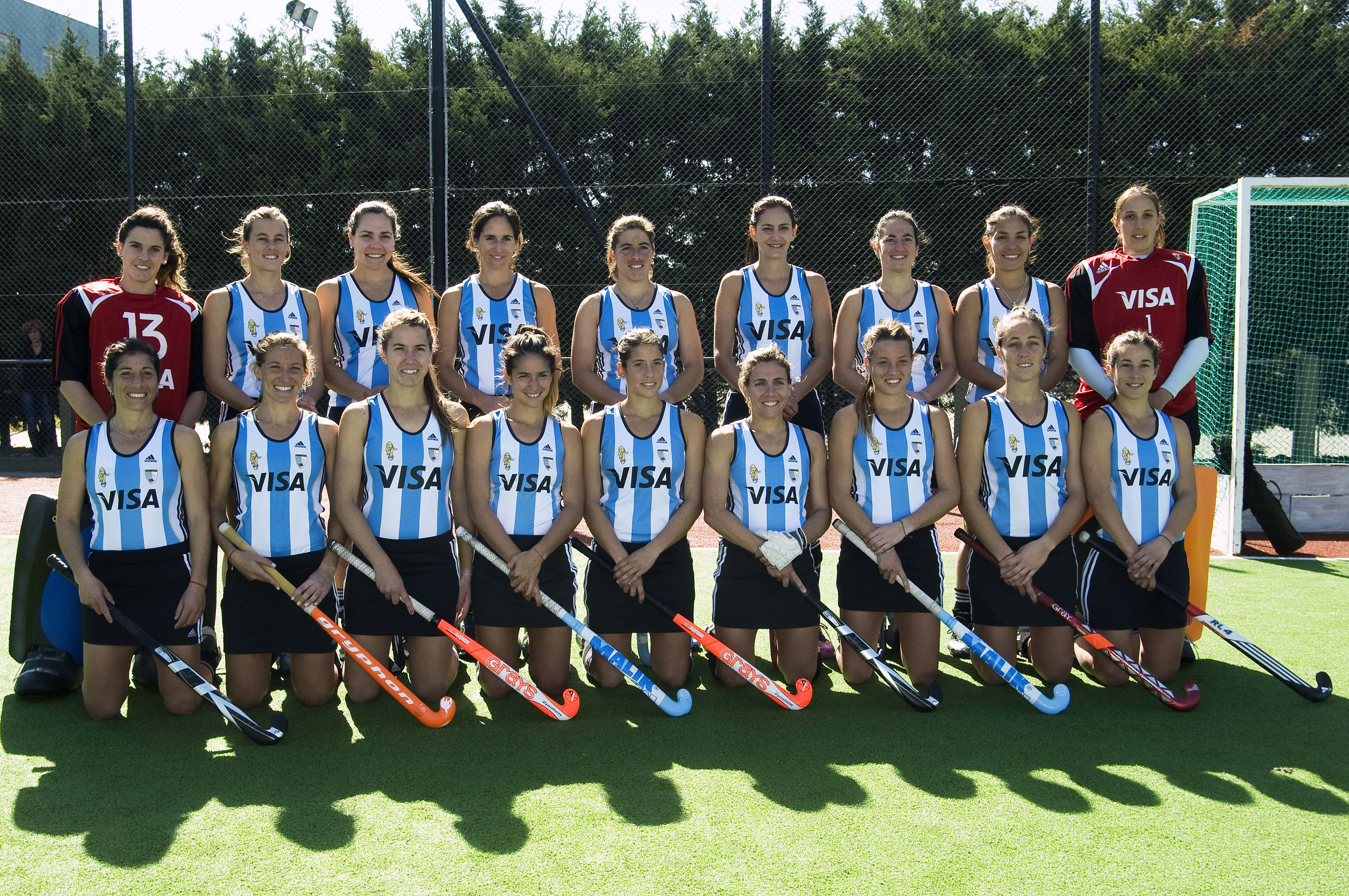
The 2010 World Champion squad

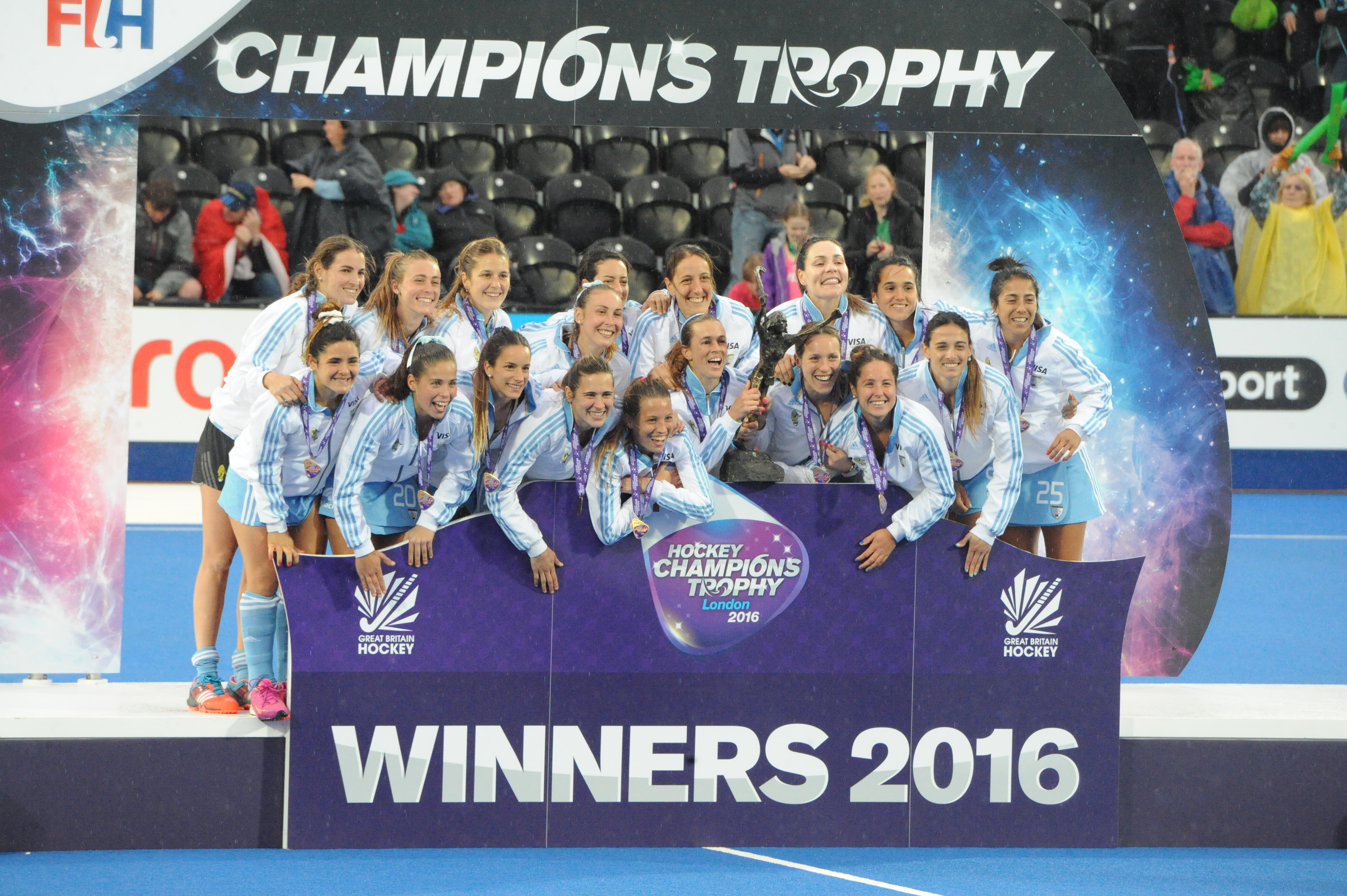
Champions Trophy winners in 2016

== See also ==
- Argentina men's national field hockey team
- Argentina women's national under-21 field hockey team

== Notes ==
- The team alternates between light blue and black skirt/socks when using their main kit, even during the same tournament, apparently arbitrarily. For example, during the 2010 World Cup, see photos from Day 1 (black), Day 3 (light blue) and Day 6 (black).
