= 2023–24 Women's FIH Hockey Nations Cup =

Women's field hockey tournament held in Spain

Tournament details
- Host country: Spain
- City: Terrassa
- Dates: 3–9 June 2024
- Teams: 8 (from 4 confederations)

Final positions
- Champions: Spain (1st title)
- Runner-up: Ireland
- Third place: Chile

Tournament statistics
- Matches played: 20
- Goals scored: 67 (3.35 per match)
- Top scorer: (Spain) Lola Riera (6 goals)
- Best player: (Spain) Lola Riera
- Best young player: (Spain) Blanca Pérez
- Best goalkeeper: (New Zealand) Brooke Roberts

The 2023–24 Women's FIH Hockey Nations Cup was the second edition of the Women's FIH Hockey Nations Cup, the annual qualification tournament for the Women's FIH Pro League organised by the International Hockey Federation. The tournament was held in Terrassa, Spain from 3 to 9 June 2024.

Spain won the tournament and were promoted to the 2024–25 Women's FIH Pro League.

== Teams ==
The eight highest ranked teams not participating in the Women's FIH Pro League participated in the tournament.

Canada

Head Coach: (South Africa) Sheldon Rostron

2. Chloe Walton
3. Thora Rae
5. Brooke McCusker
7. Anna Mollenhauer
8. Elise Wong
10. Kathleen Leahy
11. Kenzie Girgis
12. Sara Goodman
14. Karli Johansen (C)
15. Grace Delmotte
18. Alexis de Armond
19. Audrey Sawers
20. Julia Ross
21. Nora Goddard-Despot
22. Danielle Husar
24. Mikayla Stelling
31. Rowan Harris (GK)
34. Marcia LaPlante (GK)
Chile

Head Coach: (Argentina) Sergio Vigil

4. Doménica Ananías
5. Denise Rojas
6. Fernanda Flores
7. Sofía Filipek
10. Manuela Urroz
11. Josefa Salas
12. Beatriz Wirth (GK)
13. Camila Caram (C)
15. Fernanda Arrieta
16. Constanza Palma
19. Agustina Solano
20. Francisca Parra
22. Paula Valdivia
25. María Maldonado
27. Amanda Martínez
28. Natalia Salvador (GK)
47. Laura Müller
91. Josefina Gutiérrez
Ireland

Head Coach: (Argentina) Facundo Quiroga

2. Elizabeth Murphy (GK)
3. Sarah McAuley
5. Michelle Carey
6. Róisín Upton
7. Niamh Carey
8. Sarah Hawkshaw
9. Kathryn Mullan (C)
10. Hannah McLoughlin
11. Sarah Torrans
12. Elena Neill
13. Naomi Carroll
14. Ellen Curran
15. Caoimhe Perdue
16. Charlotte Beggs
17. Christina Hamill
21. Katie McKee
23. Holly Micklem (GK)
25. Siofra O'Brien
Italy

Head Coach: Andrés Monde

1. Giulia Bianchini (GK)
3. Teresa Dalla Vittoria
4. Ilaria Sarnari
7. Elettra Bormida
9. Emilia Munitis
11. Antonella Rinaldi
12. Lucía Inés Caruso (GK)
14. Antonella Bruni
18. Federica Carta (C)
21. Sara Puglisi (C)
26. Sofía Laurito
27. Lara Oviedo
28. Ivanna Pessina
33. Guadalupe Moras
47. Victoria Cabut
51. Azul Gilardi
53. Maria Lunghi
54. Lara Manzoni
Japan

Head Coach: (India) Jude Menezes

1. Eika Nakamura (GK)
5. Yu Asai
7. Miyu Suzuki
9. Yuri Nagai (C)
10. Hazuki Nagai
11. Shihori Oikawa
13. Miki Kozuka
15. Chiko Fujibayashi
17. Shiho Kobayakawa
19. Kanon Mori
23. Saki Tanaka
25. Kana Urata
26. Amiru Shimada
27. Akio Tanaka (GK)
28. Rui Takashima
29. Sakurako Omoto
36. Miyu Hasegawa
37. Rika Ogawa
New Zealand

Head Coach: Phillip Burrows

2. Olivia Shannon (C)
5. Frances Davies (C)
8. Hannah Cotter
10. Brooke Roberts (GK)
11. Casey Crowley
13. Samantha Child
16. Elizabeth Thompson
17. Stephanie Dickins
20. Megan Hull
22. Katie Doar
23. Jessie Anderson
26. Kaitlin Cotter
28. Hannah Gravenall
32. Rose Tynan
35. Kirsten Nation (GK)
36. Anna Willocks
37. Emma Findlay
43. Emma Rainey
South Korea

Head Coach: Kim Yoon

1. Kim Eun-ji (b. 2000) (GK)
5. Jeong Sae-na
7. Seo Jung-eun (C)
8. Cheon Eun-bi
9. Kim Min-jeong
10. Kim Eun-ji (b. 1999)
11. Cho Hye-jin
12. Kim Seo-na
14. Lee Yu-ri
15. Lee Yu-jin
17. Seo Su-young
18. Hong Huig-yeong
20. Park Seung-ae
21. Kim Min-ji
22. An Su-jin
24. Son Hyer-young (GK)
25. Choi Ji-yun
30. Lee Seo-yeon (GK)
Spain

Head Coach: Carlos García Cuenca

2. Laura Barrios
4. Sara Barrios
6. Clara Badia
8. Lucía Jiménez
9. María López (C)
10. Belén Iglesias
12. Florencia Amundson
13. Constanza Amundson
14. Blanca Pérez
16. Candela Mejías
17. Lola Riera
19. Begoña García
20. Xantal Giné (C)
21. Beatriz Pérez
24. Alejandra Torres-Quevedo
26. Clara Pérez (GK)
30. Patricia Álvarez
32. Jana Martínez (GK)

== Officials ==
10 umpires have been appointed by the FIH to officiate the tournament.

- Mariana Reydo (ARG)
- Tamara Leonard (AUS)
- Rhiannon Murrie (AUS)
- Sophie Bockelmann (GER)
- Rama Potnis (IND)
- Lisette Baljon (NED)
- Melissa Taylor (RSA)
- Kim Jung-hee (KOR)
- Gema Calderón (ESP)
- Clare Barwood (WAL)

== Preliminary round ==
=== Pool A ===
Pos	Team	Pld	W	D	L	GF	GA	GD	Pts	Qualification
1	Spain (H)	3	3	0	0	11	3	+8	9	Semi-finals
2	Ireland	3	2	0	1	8	5	+3	6	Semi-finals
3	South Korea	3	1	0	2	3	8	−5	3	
4	Italy	3	0	0	3	2	8	−6	0	

Source: FIH
Rules for classification: 1) points; 2) matches won; 3) goal difference; 4) goals for; 5) head-to-head result; 6) field goals scored.
(H) Hosts

3 June 2024
17:00

South Korea	2–1	Italy
An 33', 49'	Report	Carta 27'

Umpires:
Lisette Baljon (NED)
Rama Potnis (IND)

3 June 2024
19:30

Spain	5–1	Ireland
Riera 14', 29'; Segú 39', 49'; Iglesias 42'	Report	Carroll 13'

Umpires:
Mariana Reydo (ARG)
Melissa Taylora (RSA)

4 June 2024
17:00

Ireland	3–0	Italy
N. Carey 4'; McLoughlin 17', 30'	Report

Umpires:
Gema Calderón (ESP)
Clare Barwood (WAL)

4 June 2024
19:30

South Korea	1–3	Spain
Kim M. 24'	Report	Riera 25', 41'; S. Barrios 39'

Umpires:
Sophie Bockelmann (GER)
Mariana Reydo (ARG)

6 June 2024
17:00

Ireland	4–0	South Korea
McLoughlin 27'; Hawkshaw 30'; Mullan 53'; Upton 60+'	Report

Umpires:
Sophie Bockelmann (GER)
Gema Calderón (ESP)

6 June 2024
19:30

Spain	3–1	Italy
Amundson 19'; Riera 23'; L. Barrios 38'	Report	Lunghi 60'

Umpires:
Cassidy Gallagher (AUS)
Tamara Leonard (AUS)

=== Pool B ===
Pos	Team	Pld	W	D	L	GF	GA	GD	Pts	Qualification
1	New Zealand	3	2	1	0	5	2	+3	7	Semi-finals
2	Chile	3	2	0	1	5	2	+3	6	Semi-finals
3	Japan	3	1	1	1	6	4	+2	4	
4	Canada	3	0	0	3	0	8	−8	0	

Source: FIH
Rules for classification: 1) points; 2) matches won; 3) goal difference; 4) goals for; 5) head-to-head result; 6) field goals scored.

3 June 2024
10:30

New Zealand	1–0	Chile
Anderson 39'	Report

Umpires:
Clare Barwood (WAL)
Sophie Bockelmann (GER)

3 June 2024
13:00

Japan	3–0	Canada
Asai 7', 25'; S. Tanaka 38'	Report

Umpires:
Gemma Calderón (ESP)
Cassidy Gallagher (AUS)

4 June 2024
10:30

Chile	3–0	Canada
Salas 20'; Maldonado 32'; Palma 52'	Report

Umpires:
Melissa Taylor (RSA)
Lorijn de Kraker (NED)

4 June 2024
13:00

Japan	2–2	New Zealand
Mori 19'; H. Nagai 30'	Report	Dickins 32'; Gravenall 54'

Umpires:
Lisette Baljon (NED)
Tamara Leonard (AUS)

6 June 2024
10:30

New Zealand	2–0	Canada
Hull 4'; H. Cotter 40'	Report

Umpires:
Rama Potnis (IND)
Lorijn de Kraker (NED)

6 June 2024
13:00

Chile	2–1	Japan
Arrieta 21'; Salas 22'	Report	Mori 37'

Umpires:
Melissa Taylor (RSA)
Mariana Reydo (ARG)

== Classification round ==
=== Bracket ===
Crossovers
8 June
South Korea	2 (2)
Canada (pen.)	2 (3)
8 June
Japan	5
Italy	3

Fifth place
9 June
Canada	0
Japan	1
Seventh place
9 June
South Korea	1
Italy	2

=== Crossovers ===
8 June 2024
10:30

Japan	5–3	Italy
Urata 4'; Shimada 15', 31'; Ogawa 16'; Oikawa 30'	Report	Lunghi 40'; Bruni 56'; Oviedo 59'

Umpires:
Lisette Baljon (NED)
Lorijn de Kraker (NED)

8 June 2024
13:00

South Korea	2–2	Canada
Park S. 27'; Seo 42'	Report	Goodman 6'; Goddard-Despot 52'
Penalties
Cheon (penalty shoot-out scored); Kim E. (penalty shoot-out scored); Jeong (penalty shoot-out missed); Park Y. (penalty shoot-out missed); An (penalty shoot-out missed)	2–3	(penalty shoot-out scored) Sawers; (penalty shoot-out scored) Mollenhauer; (penalty shoot-out missed) Rae; (penalty shoot-out missed) Walton; (penalty shoot-out scored) Wong

Umpires:
Clare Barwood (WAL)
Tamara Leonard (AUS)

=== Seventh and eighth place ===
9 June 2024
10:30

South Korea	1–2	Italy
Kim E. 12'	Report	Bruni 16'; Laurito 60+'

Umpires:
Tamara Leonard (AUS)
Rama Potnis (IND)

=== Fifth and sixth place ===
9 June 2024
13:00

Canada	0–1	Japan
	Report	Mori 19'

Umpires:
Cassidy Gallagher (AUS)
Lorijn de Kraker (NED)

== Medal round ==
=== Bracket ===
Semi-finals
8 June
Spain	2
Chile	1
8 June
New Zealand	1
Ireland	2

Final
9 June
Spain	2
Ireland	0
Third place
9 June
Chile	2
New Zealand	1

=== Semi-finals ===
8 June 2024
17:00

New Zealand	1–2	Ireland
Tynan 35'	Report	Hawkshaw 39'; Torrans 51'

Umpires:
Mariana Reydo (ARG)
Gema Calderón (ESP)

8 June 2024
19:30

Spain	2–1	Chile
Torres-Quevedo 3'; García Grau 8'	Report	Rojas 30'

Umpires:
Sophie Bockelmann (GER)
Melissa Taylor (RSA)

=== Third and fourth place ===
9 June 2024
17:00

Chile	2–1	New Zealand
Salas 41'; Flores 53'	Report	Tynan 55'

Umpires:
Gemma Calderón (ESP)
Melissa Taylor (RSA)

=== Final ===
9 June 2024
19:30

Spain	2–0	Ireland
Álvarez 25'; Riera 30'	Report

Umpires:
Sophie Bockelmann (GER)
Mariana Reydo (ARG)

== Statistics ==
=== Final standings ===
As per statistical convention in field hockey, matches decided in extra time are counted as wins and losses, while matches decided by penalty shoot-outs are counted as draws.

Pos	Team	Pld	W	D	L	GF	GA	GD	Pts	Status
1st place, gold medalist(s)	Spain (H, P)	5	5	0	0	15	4	+11	15	Promoted to the 2024–25 Women's FIH Pro League
2nd place, silver medalist(s)	Ireland	5	3	0	2	10	8	+2	9	
3rd place, bronze medalist(s)	Chile	5	3	0	2	8	5	+3	9	
4	New Zealand	5	2	1	2	7	6	+1	7	
5	Japan	5	3	1	1	12	7	+5	10	
6	Canada	5	0	1	4	2	11	−9	1	
7	Italy	5	1	0	4	7	14	−7	3	
8	South Korea	5	1	1	3	6	12	−6	4	

Source: FIH
(H) Hosts; (P) Promoted

=== Goalscorers ===
There were 67 goals scored in 20 matches, for an average of 3.35 goals per match.

6 goals

- (Spain) Lola Riera

3 goals

- (Chile) Josefa Salas
- (Ireland) Hannah McLoughlin
- (Japan) Kanon Mori

2 goals

- (Ireland) Sarah Hawkshaw
- (Italy) Antonella Bruni
- (Italy) Maria Lunghi
- (Japan) Yu Asai
- (Japan) Amiru Shimada
- (New Zealand) Rose Tynan
- (South Korea) An Su-jin
- (Spain) Marta Segú

1 goal

- (Canada) Nora Goddard-Despot
- (Canada) Sara Goodman
- (Chile) Fernanda Arrieta
- (Chile) Fernanda Flores
- (Chile) María Maldonado
- (Chile) Constanza Palma
- (Chile) Denise Rojas
- (Ireland) Niamh Carey
- (Ireland) Naomi Carroll
- (Ireland) Kathryn Mullan
- (Ireland) Sarah Torrans
- (Ireland) Róisín Upton
- (Italy) Federica Carta
- (Italy) Sofía Laurito
- (Italy) Lara Oviedo
- (Japan) Hazuki Nagai
- (Japan) Rika Ogawa
- (Japan) Shihori Oikawa
- (Japan) Saki Tanaka
- (Japan) Kana Urata
- (New Zealand) Jessie Anderson
- (New Zealand) Hannah Cotter
- (New Zealand) Stephanie Dickins
- (New Zealand) Hannah Gravenall
- (New Zealand) Megan Hull
- (South Korea) Kim Eun-ji
- (South Korea) Kim Min-jeong
- (South Korea) Park Seo-yeon
- (South Korea) Seo Jung-eun
- (Spain) Patricia Álvarez
- (Spain) Constanza Amundson
- (Spain) Laura Barrios
- (Spain) Sara Barrios
- (Spain) Begoña García Grau
- (Spain) Belén Iglesias
- (Spain) Alejandra Torres-Quevedo

Source: FIH

== Awards ==
The awards were announced on 9 June 2024.

Award	Player
Player of the tournament	(Spain) Lola Riera
Goalkeeper of the tournament	(New Zealand) Brooke Roberts
Best junior player	(Spain) Blanca Pérez

== See also ==
- 2023–24 Men's FIH Hockey Nations Cup
- 2023–24 Women's FIH Pro League
