= 2000 Women's Pan American Junior Championship =

Field hockey tournament

Tournament details
- Host country: Barbados
- City: Bridgetown
- Dates: 13–23 April
- Teams: 9 (from 1 confederation)
- Venue: Sir Garfield Sports Complex

Final positions
- Champions: Argentina (4th title)
- Runner-up: United States
- Third place: Canada

Tournament statistics
- Matches played: 20

The 2000 Women's Junior Pan American Championship was the 4th edition of the Pan American Junior Championship, the women's international under-21 field hockey championship of the Americas organized by the Pan American Hockey Federation.

The tournament was at the Sir Garfield Sports Complex in Bridgetown, Barbados, from 13–23 April.

Argentina were the defending champions, and successfully defended their title with a 5–0 win over the United States in the final. Canada finished in third place, defeating Chile 3–2 in penalties following a 0–0 draw.

== Results ==
=== Preliminary round ===
==== Pool A ====
Pos	Team	Pld	W	D	L	GF	GA	GD	Pts	Qualification
1	United States	3	3	0	0	17	2	+15	9	Advanced to Semi-finals
2	Canada	3	2	0	1	13	5	+8	6	Advanced to Semi-finals
3	Barbados (H)	3	1	0	2	2	8	−6	3	
4	Venezuela	3	0	0	3	1	18	−17	0	

Source: Pan American Hockey Federation
Rules for classification: 1) points; 2) goal difference; 3) goals scored; 4) head-to-head result.
(H) Hosts

==== Pool B ====
Pos	Team	Pld	W	D	L	GF	GA	GD	Pts	Qualification
1	Argentina	4	4	0	0	42	1	+41	12	Advanced to Semi-finals
2	Chile	4	3	0	1	13	7	+6	9	Advanced to Semi-finals
3	Trinidad and Tobago	4	2	0	2	4	15	−11	6	
4	Bermuda	4	1	0	3	2	19	−17	3	
5	Mexico	4	0	0	4	1	20	−19	0	

Source: Pan American Hockey Federation
Rules for classification: 1) points; 2) goal difference; 3) goals scored; 4) head-to-head result.

=== Classification round ===
==== Fifth to eighth place classification ====
Crossover
20 April
Barbados	2
Bermuda	0
20 April
Trinidad and Tobago (pen.)	0 (4)
Venezuela	0 (2)

Fifth Place
22 April
Barbados (pen.)	1 (2)
Trinidad and Tobago	1 (1)
Seventh Place
22 April
Bermuda	1
Venezuela	3

===== Crossover =====
20 April 2000
12:30

Barbados	2–0	Bermuda
	Report

20 April 2000
15:00

Trinidad and Tobago	0–0	Venezuela
	Report
Penalties
	4–2

===== Seventh and eighth place =====
22 April 2000
16:00

Bermuda	1–3	Venezuela
	Report

===== Fifth and sixth place =====
22 April 2000
18:30

Barbados	1–1	Trinidad and Tobago
	Report
Penalties
	2–1

==== First to fourth place classification ====
Semi-finals
20 April
United States	4
Chile	1
20 April
Argentina	8
Canada	0

Final
23 April
United States	0
Argentina	5
Third Place
23 April
Chile	0 (2)
Canada (pen.)	0 (3)

===== Semi-finals =====
20 April 2000
17:30

United States	4–1	Chile
Gannon 17'; Woolley 25'; Gailie 30'; Welsh 66'	Report	Villagra 56'

20 April 2000
20:00

Argentina	8–0	Canada
	Report

===== Third and fourth place =====
23 April 2000
16:00

Chile	0–0	Canada
	Report
Penalties
	2–3

===== Final =====
23 April 2000
18:30

United States	0–5	Argentina
	Report

== Final standings ==
- Note: as Argentina qualified for the 2001 FIH Junior World Cup as the host nation, Chile took the remaining entry quota as the next highest ranked team.

Pos	Team	Pld	W	D	L	GF	GA	GD	Pts	Qualification
1st place, gold medalist(s)	Argentina	6	6	0	0	55	1	+54	18	
2nd place, silver medalist(s)	United States	5	4	0	1	21	8	+13	12	2001 FIH Junior World Cup
3rd place, bronze medalist(s)	Canada	5	2	1	2	13	13	0	7	2001 FIH Junior World Cup
4	Chile	6	3	1	2	14	11	+3	10	2001 FIH Junior World Cup
5	Barbados (H)	5	2	1	2	5	9	−4	7	
6	Trinidad and Tobago	6	2	2	2	6	17	−11	8	
7	Venezuela	5	1	1	3	4	19	−15	4	
8	Bermuda	6	1	0	5	3	24	−21	3	
9	Mexico	4	0	0	4	1	20	−19	0	

Source: Pan American Hockey Federation
(H) Hosts
