= Nora Goddard-Despot =

Canadian field hockey player

Personal information
- Born: 10 January 2001 (age 25) North Vancouver, British Columbia, Canada
- Height: 165 cm (5 ft 5 in)

Sport
- Sport: Field hockey
- Position: Midfield
National team
Years	Team	Caps	Goals
2019–2022	Canada U–21	13	(0)
2021–	Canada	7	(1)
Medal record
Women's field hockey
Representing Canada
Junior Pan American Cup
Gold medal – first place	2021 Santiago	Team

Nora Goddard-Despot (born 10 January 2001) is a field hockey player from Canada.

== Personal life ==
Nora Goddard-Despot was born and raised in North Vancouver. She has two younger sisters, Arden and Stella, who also play representative field hockey for Canada.

She studied at Providence College.

== Field hockey ==
=== Under–21 ===
Goddard-Despot made her junior international debut in 2019 at an invitational tournament in Dublin.

She didn't represent the junior national team again until 2021, where she competed at the postponed Junior Pan American Cup in Santiago. At the tournament, the Canadian team made history, winning gold for the first time and qualifying for the FIH Junior World Cup. She made the journey to South Africa later that year to compete in the Junior World Cup, however the tournament was postponed due to an outbreak of the Omicron variant of COVID-19.

In 2022 Goddard-Despot returned to South Africa, competing in the postponed FIH Junior World Cup in Potchefstroom.

=== Senior national team ===
Goddard-Despot made her senior international debut in 2024. She earned her first cap in a test match against Scotland in Glasgow. She then went on to appear at her first major tournament, representing Canada at the 2023–24 FIH Nations Cup in Terrassa.

== International goals ==
The following is a list of goals scored by Goddard-Despot at international level.

Goal	Date	Location	Opponent	Score	Result	Competition	Ref.
1	8 June 2024	Estadi Martí Colomer, Terrassa, Spain	South Korea	2–2	2–2	2023–24 FIH Nations Cup	
