= Brooke McCusker =

Canadian field hockey player

Personal information
- Born: 26 July 2003 (age 23) North Vancouver, Canada
- Height: 170 cm (5 ft 7 in)

Sport
- Sport: Field hockey
- Position: Midfield
- Club: Wake Forest University
National team
Years	Team	Caps	Goals
2023–2024	Canada U–21	11	(3)
2023–	Canada	12	(0)
Medal record
Women's field hockey
Representing Canada

Brooke McCusker (born 26 July 2003) is a field hockey player from Canada.

== Personal life ==
McCusker grew up in North Vancouver, British Columbia, Canada.

She is a student at Wake Forest University.

== Field hockey ==
=== Domestic league ===
McCusker currently competes in the intercollegiate competition in the United States hosted by the National Collegiate Athletic Association. In the league, she represents the Demon Deacons of Wake Forest University. She previously represented West Vancouver FHC in the domestic league of Field Hockey British Columbia.

=== Under–21 ===
From 2023 until 2024, McCusker was a member of the Canada U–21 squad. During her junior career, she represented the team at two major tournaments. She made appearances at the 2023 and 2024 editions of the Pan American Junior Championship, held in Saint Michael and Surrey, respectively.

=== Senior national team ===
McCusker received her first call-up to the senior national squad in 2023. She was named in the travelling squad for a test series against the United States in Charlotte, however she did not earn a senior international cap while on tour.

She was named in the national team again in 2024. She was named in the travelling squad for a European tour through June and July. During this tour, she made her senior international debut during a test series against Scotland in Glasgow, and made appearances at the 2023–24 FIH Nations Cup in Terrassa.

In 2025, she was again named in the national squad for her second FIH Nations Cup in Santiago. She has also been named in the squad for the 2025 Pan American Cup in Montevideo.
