= Mia Abello =

American field hockey player

Personal information
- Born: July 3, 2004 (age 22) Houston, Texas
- Height: 168 cm (5 ft 6 in)

Sport
- Sport: Field hockey
- Position: Midfield
National team
Years	Team	Caps	Goals
2023–	United States U–21	23	(2)
2025–	United States	1	(0)
Medal record
Women's field hockey
Representing United States
Pan American Junior Championship
Gold medal – first place	2023 St. Michael
Silver medal – second place	2024 Surrey

Mia Abello (born July 3, 2004) is a field hockey player from the United States.

== Personal life ==
Mia Abello was born and raised in Houston, Texas.

She is a student at the University of Virginia.

== Career ==
=== Under–21 ===
Abello made her international debut for the United States at under–21 level in 2023. She represented the junior squad at the Pan American Junior Championship in Saint Michael, where she won a gold medal. Later that year she represented the team again, competing at the FIH Junior World Cup in Santiago, Chile.

In 2024 she represented the junior squad again, taking home silver at her second Pan American Junior Championship, held in Surrey.

=== Senior national team ===
Abello received her first call-up to the national squad in 2022.

Abello made her senior international debut during a test series against New Zealand in Auckland on January 20, 2025.
