= Olivia Bent-Cole =

American field hockey player (born 2005)

Personal information
- Full name: Olivia May Bent-Cole
- Born: June 15, 2005 (age 21) Philadelphia, Pennsylvania, United States

Sport
- Sport: Field hockey
- Position: Forward
Senior career
| Years | Team | Caps | Goals |
| 2023– | Northwestern University | - | - |
National team
| Years | Team | Caps | Goals |
| 2022– | United States | 5 | (0) |
| 2023– | United States U–21 | 4 | (2) |
Medal record
Women's field hockey
Representing United States
Pan American Junior Championship
| Gold medal – first place | 2023 Saint Michael | Team |
| Silver medal – second place | 2024 Surrey | Team |
| Silver medal – second place | 2026 Santiago | Team |

Olivia May Bent-Cole (born June 15, 2005) is an American field hockey forward who has played as part of the United States women's national field hockey team.

== Personal life ==
Olivia Bent-Cole was born and raised in Philadelphia and attended Camden Catholic High School, where she scored a goal in the school's 2–1 win in the 2022 Non-Public state championship game against Oak Knoll School of the Holy Child, earning the program's first state title since 1985. She is a student at Northwestern University.

She is sponsored by Osaka.

== Career ==
=== Under–21 ===
Bent-Cole made her debut for the United States U–21 team in 2023 at the Pan American Junior Championship in Saint Michael. She was also named in the squad for the FIH Junior World Cup in Santiago later that year.

=== National team ===
In 2022, at just 16 years of age, Bent-Cole made her senior international debut during season three of the FIH Pro League.

She was named in the national squad for the 2023 season.
