= Lauren Wadas =

American field hockey player

Personal information
- Born: April 9, 2002 (age 24) Annville, PA, United States

Sport
- Sport: Field hockey
- Position: Midfield
National team
Years	Team	Caps	Goals
2021–2023	United States U–21	20	(2)
2025–	United States	6	(0)
Medal record
Women's field hockey
Representing United States
Pan American Junior Championship
Gold medal – first place	2023 Bridgetown
Bronze medal – third place	2021 Santiago

Lauren Wadas (born April 9, 2002) is a field hockey player from the United States.

== Personal life ==
Lauren Wadas was born in Annville, Pennsylvania.

She is a former student of Palmyra Area High School and Northwestern University.

== Career ==
=== Under–21 ===
In 2021, Wadas made her first appearances for the United States U–21 team. She was a member of the bronze medal-winning squad at the Pan American Junior Championship in Santiago.

At the 2022 FIH Junior World Cup in Potchefstroom she was a member of the squad.

She was named captain of the junior national team in 2023. She led the squad to a gold medal at her second Pan American Junior Championship in Bridgetown. She then went on to represent the side at her second FIH Junior World Cup in Santiago, finishing in tenth place.

=== Senior national team ===
Wadas made her senior international debut in 2024, during the fifth season of the FIH Pro League. She earned her first senior cap for the United States national team during a match against Argentina in Antwerp. She made six appearances during the season.

In 2026 she returned to the national team, being named in the squad for the Summer of Hockey Series in Dunedin.
