= Julia Boraston =

Canadian field hockey player

Personal information
- Born: 3 September 2004 (age 21) Victoria, Canada
- Height: 162 cm (5 ft 4 in)

Sport
- Sport: Field hockey
- Position: Midfield
- Club: Victoria Vikes
National team
Years	Team	Caps	Goals
2023–	Canada U–21	17	(0)
2025–	Canada	0	(0)
Medal record
Women's field hockey
Representing Canada

Julia Boraston (born 3 September 2004) is a field hockey player from Canada.

== Personal life ==
Boraston was born and raised in Victoria, the capital city of British Columbia, Canada.

She is a student at the University of Victoria.

== Field hockey ==
=== Domestic league ===
Boraston currently represents the Victoria Vikes, the field hockey team of the University of Victoria, in the Canada West conference of intercollegiate competition of Canada.

=== Under–21 ===
Since 2023, Boraston has been a member of the Canada U–21 squad. She made her debut for the team at the 2023 Pan American Junior Championship in Saint Michael, where they finished in fourth place. Later that year she represented the team again at the 2023 FIH Junior World Cup in Santiago.

In 2024 she continued representing the national under–21 squad, appearing at the Pan American Junior Championship in Surrey.

As of 2025, Boraston is an active member of the national junior squad.

=== Senior national team ===
Boraston received her first call-up to the senior national squad in 2025. She was named as a travelling reserve for the 2024–25 FIH Nations Cup in Santiago. Despite not earning any international caps at the FIH Nations Cup, Boraston is set to make her senior international debut during the 2025 Pan American Cup in Montevideo.
