= Julia Ross =

Canadian field hockey player

Personal information
- Born: 27 July 2001 (age 25) Vancouver, Canada
- Height: 167 cm (5 ft 6 in)

Sport
- Sport: Field hockey
- Position: Forward
- Club: Vancouver Hawks
National team
Years	Team	Caps	Goals
2019–2022	Canada U–21	12	(0)
2024–	Canada	12	(0)
Medal record
Women's field hockey
Representing Canada
Pan American Junior Championship
Gold medal – first place	2021 Santiago

Julia Ross (born 27 July 2001) is a field hockey player from Canada.

== Personal life ==
Ross grew up in Vancouver, a city in British Columbia, Canada.

She is a student at the University of Maine.

== Field hockey ==
=== Domestic league ===
At domestic level, Ross currently represents the Vancouver Hawks FHC in the VWFHA. She has also previously represented Polar Bears FHC, and the UOM Black Bears in the United States intercollegiate competition, hosted by the National Collegiate Athletic Association.

=== Under–21 ===
From 2019 until 2022, Ross was a member of the Canada U–21 squad.

During her junior career, she represented the team at three tournaments. She made her debut in 2019 during a Four–Nations Tournament in Dublin. In 2021 she won her first medal with the team, taking home an historic gold medal at the Pan American Junior Championship in Santiago. Through their victory, the team qualified for the FIH Junior World Cup. Ross concluded her junior career with an appearance at the 2022 FIH Junior World Cup in Potchefstroom, where the team finished in last place.

=== Senior national team ===
Ross received her first call-up to the senior national team in 2024. She was included in the squad for a European tour through June and July. During this tour, she earned her first official cap during a test series against Scotland in Glasgow, and followed this with appearances at the 2023–24 FIH Nations Cup in Terrassa.

In 2025, she was again named in the national squad for her second FIH Nations Cup in Santiago. She has also been named as a travelling reserve in the squad for the 2025 Pan American Cup in Montevideo.
