= Ashley Sessa =

American field hockey player

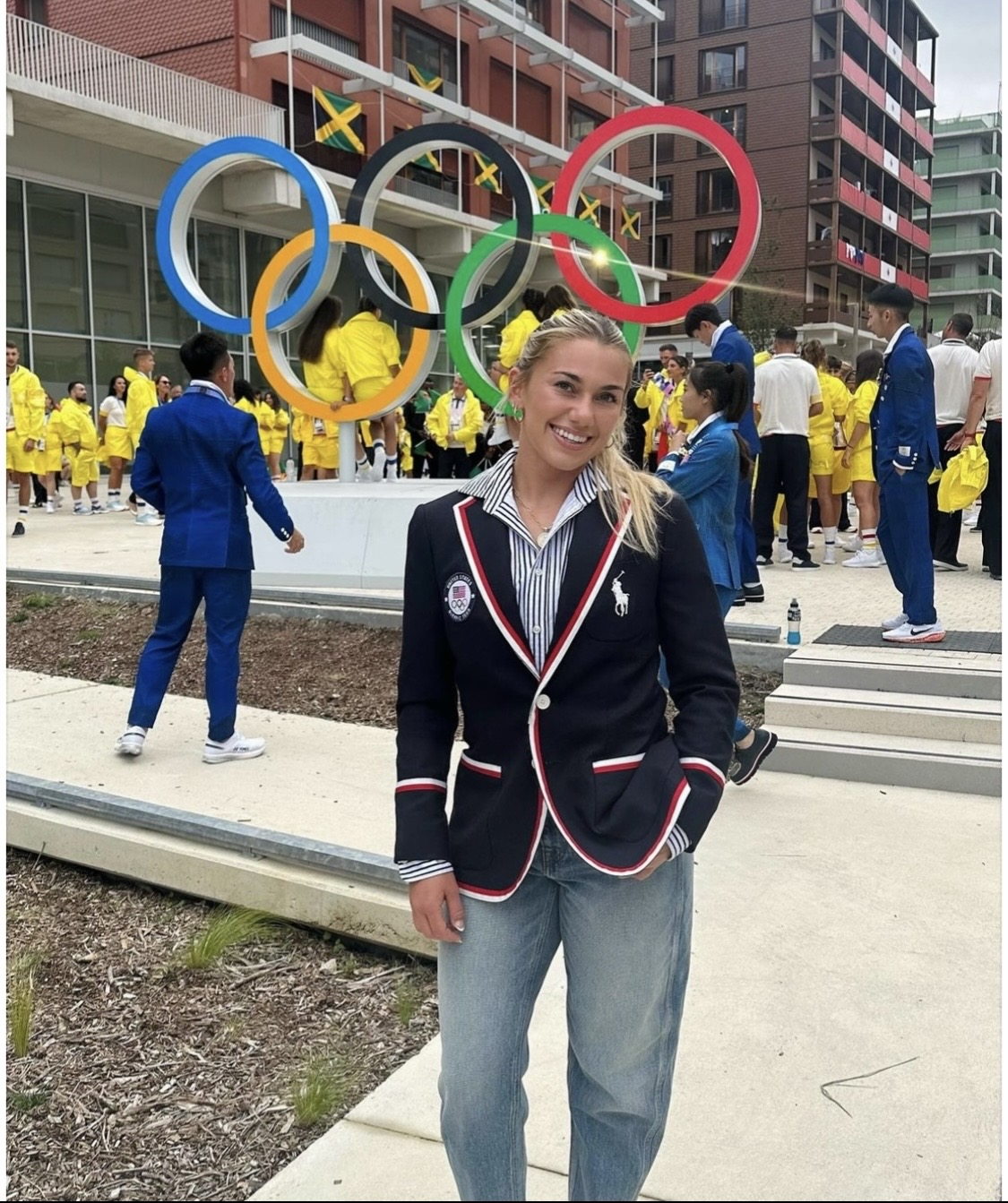
- Sessa at the 2024 Summer Olympics

Personal information
- Full name: Ashley Nicole Sessa
- Born: June 23, 2004 (age 22) Schwenksville, Pennsylvania, U.S.
- Height: 5 ft 1 in (155 cm)

Sport
- Sport: Field hockey
- Position: Midfield/Forward
- Club: WC Eagles
National team
| Years | Team | Caps | Goals |
| 2019–2021 | United States Indoor | 10 | (12) |
| 2021–2022 | United States U–21 | 10 | (4) |
| 2022– | United States | 62 | (21) |
Medal record
Representing United States
| Silver medal – second place | The Nations Cup 2026 | {{{2}}} |
Pan American Games
| Silver medal – second place | 2023 Santiago | Team |
Pan American Cup
| Silver medal – second place | 2025 Montevideo |
Pan American Junior Championship
| Bronze medal – third place | 2021 Santiago |
Women's indoor hockey
Indoor Pan American Cup
| Gold medal – first place | 2021 Spring City |

Ashley Nicole Sessa (born June 23, 2004) is an American field hockey player, who plays as a midfielder and forward.

== Personal life ==
Ashley Sessa was born and raised in Schwenksville, Pennsylvania. Sessa has been playing field hockey since the age of four. She attend Spring-Ford High School in Royersford, PA her freshman year, then transferred to Episcopal Academy in Newtown Square, PA where she graduated in 2022. Ashley Sessa was the first high school field hockey player to take advantage of the NIL rule her senior year via sponsorship by STX, LLC. Sessa was a member of the University of North Carolina 2022 National and ACC Championship Team. Ashley transferred to Northwestern University in 2024 after taking an Olympic Waiver year in 2023. Sessa won her second consecutive National Championship and undefeated regular season in 2024 with Northwestern (setting a school record for most games won in a single season). For the 2024 season she was named to the Big Ten Players to Watch List, NFHCA Division I Watchlist, Big Ten Offensive Player of the Week (Oct. 7, Oct. 22, Nov 4 ), NFHCA Division I Offensive Player of the Week (Oct. 9, Oct. 23, Nov. 4), Big Ten Regular Season Champion, First Team All-Big Ten, Big Ten Offensive Player of the Year, Topped both Big Ten and Nation as statistical player of the year in points per game with 2.94 points per game, Big Ten All-Tournament Team, All-NCAA Tournament Team, NCAA Division I National Champion, NFHCA All-West Region First Team, NFHCA 1st team All American. Sessa also now holds the Northwestern all-time record of most points in a season with 67 points (24 goals, 19 assists).

Sessa is a current member of the U.S. Women's National Field Hockey Team where she was one of only two players to be selected in the U.S. Women's National Field Hockey Team at age 16 in 2021; the first was Katie Bam, selected in 2005. She was a member of the U.S. Women's National Indoor Field Hockey Team where she was selected at age 14 and the U.S. U-21Junior National Field Hockey Team. She was named to the 2024 Paris Olympic Roster, she started in all 4 games and scored the first goal against Argentina for the United States. Sessa was the youngest member of the USAWNT for the 2024 games and the second youngest player ever named to a USA Field hockey Olympic squad.

== Career ==
=== U.S. Women's National Field Hockey Teams ===
Ashley Sessa was named to the U.S. Women's National Field Hockey Team in June 2021, her first cap was recorded on November 26, 2021 against Canada in the Canadian Test Series in Chula Vista, California. Sessa's second National Team appearance she placed 4th in the 2022 Pan American Cup in Santiago, Chile.

In 2019, Sessa made her first appearance for the U.S. Women's National Indoor Field Hockey Team, during a test series against Croatia in Sveti Ivan Zelina. She then went on to represent the U.S. at the Indoor Croatia Cup, in Sveti Ivan Zelina, Croatia, where she won a gold medal. In 2020, Sessa made her second international appearance with the U.S. Indoor Field Hockey Team at the Rohrmax Cup in Vienna, Austria winning a bronze medal. She won her second gold medal in her third debut with the U.S. Indoor team in 2021, at the Indoor Pan American Cup in Spring City, Pennsylvania where she was also named Player of the Tournament and to the Pan American Elite Team.

In 2023 Sessa accepted an Olympic waiver to take a year off of college and train full time with the Women’s National team in Charlotte, NC for the 2024 Olympic qualifying tournaments. The first was the Pan American Games (Santiago Chile), where the team won a silver medal. Sessa was also named to the 2023 Pan American Elite Team.

The silver medal win at the 2023 Pan American Games qualified the USAWNT for the 2024 FIH Hockey Olympic Qualifier (Ranchi, India) where they won a silver medal and qualified for the 2024 Paris Olympics, Sessa was named Player of the Match in the qualifying game against Japan.

Sessa recorded her 50th cap on June 6, 2024 against Great Britain in the 2024 FIH League.

At age 19, Sessa became the second-youngest woman ever to be named to a USA Fieldhockey Olympic roster after Katelyn Falgowski in 2008 (19 years 292 days).

Ashley Sessa netted USA's and her first Olympic goal (2024) in the USA's first game vs (#2) Argentina.

Junior National Field Hockey Team

Ashley Sessa made her debut for the U.S. U-21 Junior National Field Hockey Team team in 2021, winning a bronze medal at the Junior Pan American Championship in Santiago, Chile. Sessa also was a member of the U.S. U-21 Junior National Field Hockey Team which placed 8th in the 2021 Junior World Cup in Potchefstroom, South Africa.

World Championship Experience

- Silver medal - USA Women's National Team - 2024 FIH Olympic Qualifiers (Ranchi, India), Named Player of the Match against Japan on January 18, 2024
- 2023 Pan American Elite Team selection
- Silver medal - USA Women's National Team - 2023 Pan American Games (Santiago, Chile)
- Gold medal - 2021 Indoor Pan American Cup (Spring City, Pennsylvania.), Named Most Valuable Female Player of the Tournament
- 2021 Pan American Indoor Elite Team selection
- Bronze medal - 2021 Junior Pan American Championship (Santiago, Chile)
- 4th - 2022 Pan American Cup (Santiago, Chile)
- 8th - 2021 Junior World Cup (Potchefstroom, South Africa)
- 9th - 2022-2023 FIH Pro League (worldwide)
- 9th - 2021-2022 FIH Pro League (worldwide)

Other Career Highlights

- 2025: Named to the Women’s Pan American Cup Roster ( sidelined due to injury )

2025: Named to the U.S. Women's National Team Series against New Zealand (Charlotte, N.C.) 2025: Named to the U.S. Women's National Team Nations Cup Tournament Roster ( sidelined due to injury) 2024: Became first NCAA field hockey player to win back-to-back consecutive National Championships at 2 different schools (Northwestern and UNC)

- 2024: B1G Offensive player of the year (2024), Northwestern's single season points record holder with 67 points (24 goals, 19 assists), Led the Big Ten (second in Division I) with 24 goals and 19 assists, B1G Offensive Player of The Week (10/7/2024, 10/21/2024, 11/4/2024), NFHCA National Offensive Player of the Week (10/9/2024, 10/23/2024), B1G All-Tournament Team (2024), NFHCA All-West First Team (2022, 2023, 2024), NFHCA First-Team All-American (2024), NCAA All-Tournament Team (2024)
- 2024: Named to the 2024 Paris Olympic Roster
- 2024: Named to the Women's FIH 2024 Roster
- 2023: Named to the Women's FIH Hockey Olympic Qualifier 2024 India Roster
- 2023: Named to the U.S. Women's National Team (June), Series against Canada (Charlotte, N.C.), Series against New Zealand (Charlotte, N.C.)
- 2023: Named to the Women's Pan American Games Roster
- 2023: Named to the Women's FIH 2023 Roster
- 2022: Named to the Women's Pan American Cup Roster
- 2022: Named to the U.S. Women's National Team
- 2021: Named to the U.S. Women's National Team, Series against Canada (Chula Vista, California), Recorded first cap on November 26 against Canada
- 2021: Named to the U.S. National Indoor Team, Named 2021 Indoor Pan American Cup Most Valuable Player of the Tournament
- 2021: Named to U.S. Rise Women's National Team
- 2020: Named to the U.S. U-17 Women's National Team, Series against Canada (Chula Vista, California)
- 2020: Named to the U.S. Women's National Indoor Team, Rohrmax Cup (Vienna, Austria)
- 2019: Named to the U.S. Women's National Indoor Team, Croatia Cup (Sveti Ivan Zelina, Croatia)
- 2019: Named to the U.S. U-17 Women's National Team, Germany Tour
- 2018: Named to the U.S. Women's National Development Indoor Team
- 2018: Named to the U.S. U-17 Women's National Team
- 2017: Named to the U.S. U-17 Women's National Indoor Team

=== Club Hockey ===
Ashley Sessa started playing club field hockey at the age of 8 in the WC Eagles Hockey Club (2014 - 2022). She was an eight-time National and Regional Club Champion and ten-time National Indoor Tournament Champion. Sessa was member of the WC Eagles International Travel Squad where she won a gold medal at the 2019 Holland Elite Cup in HC Den Bosch, Netherlands. She won a second gold medal and top scorer award at the 2018 Repton Cup in Repton, England and participated in the China International Series in Spring City, Pennsylvania.
