= Chiara Ambrosini =

Argentine field hockey player

Personal information
- Born: 2 November 2006 (age 19) Buenos Aires, Argentina

Sport
- Sport: Field hockey
- Position: Defender
- Club: Ferro
National team
Years	Team	Caps	Goals
2025 – present	Argentina U–21	12	(20)
2024–	Argentina	19	(4)
Medal record
Pan American Cup
Gold medal – first place	2025 Montevideo
South American Games
Gold medal – first place	2026 Santa Fe
FIH Junior World Cup
Silver medal – second place	2025 Santiago	Team
Pan American Junior Championship
Gold medal – first place	2026 Santiago	Team

Chiara Ambrosini (born 2 November 2006) is a field hockey player from Argentina.

== Career ==
=== Las Leonas ===
Ambrosini received her maiden call-up to the senior national squad in 2024. She made her senior international debut for Las Leonas in December, during the first of two Argentina legs of the 2024–25 Women's FIH Pro League, held in Santiago del Estero. Then, in February, she returned to play in the Pro League in Santiago del Estero against Belgium and Australia. Months later, she was called up again for the European Pro League in June, where they faced Spain, England, India, and China. Finally, she played in the Copa América in Uruguay in July, where they faced Uruguay, Canada, Paraguay, Chile, and the United States.

She has been named in an extended national squad for 2025.
