= Hope Rose =

American field hockey player

Personal information
- Full name: Hope Skylar Rose
- Born: February 28, 2003 (age 23) Dauphin, Pennsylvania, U.S.
- Height: 5 ft 4 in (162 cm)

Sport
- Sport: Field hockey
- Position: Forward/Mid field
- Club: WC Eagles
National team
Years	Team	Caps	Goals
2019–	United States Indoor	10	(28)
2021–	United States U–21	5	(3)
Medal record
Representing United States
Women's field hockey
Pan American Junior Championship
Silver medal – second place	2024 Surrey	Team
Bronze medal – third place	2021 Santiago	Team
Women's indoor hockey
Indoor Pan American Cup
Gold medal – first place	2021 Spring City	Team

Hope Skylar Rose (born February 28, 2003) is an American indoor and field hockey player, who plays as a forward.

== Personal life ==
Hope Rose was born and raised in Dauphin, Pennsylvania.

Hope Rose is a student at the University of Maryland.

== Career ==
=== Club hockey ===
Hope Rose is a current player for the WC Eagles hockey team.

=== Indoor ===
In 2019, Rose made her first appearance for the United States Indoor team, during a test series against Croatia in Sveti Ivan Zelina. She then went on to represent the team at the Indoor Croatia Cup, where she won a gold medal.

Rose won her second gold medal with the USA Indoor team in 2021, at the Indoor Pan American Cup in Spring City.

=== Junior national team ===
Hope Rose made her debut for the United States U–21 team in 2021, at the Pan American Junior Championship in Santiago.
