= Francisca Irazoqui =

Chilean field hockey player

Personal information
- Full name: Francisca Irazoqui Ríos
- Born: 4 December 2003 (age 22) Chile

Sport
- Sport: Field hockey
- Position: Midfield
National team
Years	Team	Caps	Goals
2021–	Chile U21	4	(0)
2022–	Chile	2	(0)
Medal record
Women's field hockey
Representing Chile
Pan American Games
Bronze medal – third place	2023 Santiago	Team
Pan American Junior Championship
Bronze medal – third place	2023 St. Michael
Bronze medal – third place	2024 Surrey

Francisca Irazoqui Ríos (born 4 December 2003) is a field hockey player from Chile.

== Personal life ==
Irazoqui has an older

sister, Antonia, who has also represented Chile in field hockey.

== Career ==
=== Junior national team ===
Francisca Irazoqui made her debut for the Chile U–21 team at the 2021 Pan American Junior Championship in Santiago, Chile.

=== Las Diablas ===
Following her junior debut, Irazoqui was named in the Las Diablas squad for the first time the in 2022. She made her debut at the inaugural FIH Nations Cup in Valencia.
