= Abigail Tamer =

American field hockey player (born 2003)

Abby Tamer
Personal information
- Full name: Abigail Tamer
- Born: July 9, 2003 (age 23) Whitmore Lake, Michigan, U.S.

Sport
- Sport: Field hockey
- Position: Forward
Senior career
Years	Team	Caps	Goals
–	University of Michigan	-	-
National team
Years	Team	Caps	Goals
2021–	United States U–21	13	(4)
2023–	United States	4	(2)
Medal record
Women's field hockey
Representing United States
Pan American Cup
Silver medal – second place	2025 Montevideo
Pan American Junior Championship
Gold medal – first place	2023 Saint Michael
Bronze medal – third place	2021 Santiago

Abigail "Abby" Tamer (born July 9, 2003) is a field hockey player from the United States.

== Personal life ==
Abigail Tamer was born in Whitmore Lake, and grew up in Dexter.

== Career ==
=== Under–21 ===
Abigail Tamer made her debut for the United States U–21 in 2021 at the Pan American Junior Championship in Santiago. She went on to represent the team later that year at the FIH Junior World Cup in Potchefstroom.

In 2023, Tamer was a member of the gold medal-winning team at the Pan American Junior Championship in Saint Michael.

=== National team ===
Tamer made her senior international debut during season four of the FIH Pro League.

==== International goals ====
Goal	Date	Location	Opponent	Score	Result	Competition	Ref.
1	June 18, 2023	Lee Valley Hockey Stadium, London, Great Britain	Great Britain	1–3	2–4	2022–23 FIH Pro League	
2	June 20, 2023	Lee Valley Hockey Stadium, London, Great Britain	Netherlands	1–0	2–3	2022–23 FIH Pro League	
