= Danielle Husar =

Canadian field hockey player

Personal information
- Born: 16 May 2001 (age 25) Mississauga, Ontario, Canada
- Height: 170 cm (5 ft 7 in)
- Weight: 61 kg (134 lb)

Sport
- Sport: Field hockey
- Position: Midfield
National team
Years	Team	Caps	Goals
2019–2022	Canada U–21	13	(0)
2021–	Canada	12	(2)
Medal record
Women's field hockey
Representing Canada
Junior Pan American Cup
Gold medal – first place	2021 Santiago	Team

Danielle Husar (born 16 May 2001) is a field hockey player from Canada.

== Personal life ==
Danielle Husar was born and raised in Mississauga, Ontario.

She has studied at both the University of Virginia and Old Dominion University.

== Field hockey ==
=== Under–21 ===
Goddard-Despot made her junior international debut in 2019 at an invitational tournament in Dublin.

She didn't represent the junior national team again until 2021, where she competed at the postponed Junior Pan American Cup in Santiago. At the tournament, the Canadian team made history, winning gold for the first time and qualifying for the FIH Junior World Cup. She made the journey to South Africa later that year to compete in the Junior World Cup, however the tournament was postponed due to an outbreak of the Omicron variant of COVID-19. As a result of the outbreak, the team was stranded in South Africa for almost two weeks.

In 2022 Husar returned to South Africa, competing in the postponed FIH Junior World Cup in Potchefstroom.

=== Senior national team ===
Husar made her senior international debut in 2024. She earned her first cap during the FIH Olympic Qualifiers in Valencia. She later went on to appear in a test series against Scotland in Glasgow, as well as her first major tournament, the 2023–24 FIH Nations Cup in Terrassa.

She has been named in the squad for the upcoming third edition of the FIH Nations Cup in Santiago.

== International goals ==
The following is a list of goals scored by Husar at international level.

Goal	Date	Location	Opponent	Score	Result	Competition	Ref.
1	21 January 2024	Estadio Beteró, Valencia, Spain	South Korea	1–0	1–2	2024 FIH Olympic Qualifiers	
2	26 May 2024	Glasgow National Hockey Centre, Glasgow, Scotland	Scotland	1–2	1–3	Test Match	
