= Jordyn Faiczak =

Canadian field hockey player

Personal information
- Born: 2 April 1999 (age 27) Waterloo, Ontario, Canada
- Height: 157 cm (5 ft 2 in)

Sport
- Sport: Field hockey
- Position: Midfield
National team
Years	Team	Caps	Goals
2016–2021	Canada U–21	14	(0)
2017–	Canada	29	(7)
Medal record
Women's field hockey
Representing Canada
Pan American Cup
Bronze medal – third place	2022 Santiago	Team
Pan American Junior Championship
Gold medal – first place	2021 Santiago	Team

Jordyn Faiczak (born 2 April 1999) is a field hockey player from Canada.

== Personal life ==
Jordyn Faiczak was born and raised in Waterloo, Ontario. She has a younger sister named Taylor. Faiczak attended the Bluevale Collegiate Institute. She later attended the University of British Columbia.

== Career ==
Faiczak began playing field hockey in grade seven and joined her first provincial field hockey team when she was in grade nine. As a forward for her high school team, the Bluevale Knights, Faiczak was an all-Ontario (OFSAA) champion. It was the school's first OFSAA gold-medal. The team, with Faiczak, had placed second and third in the two years prior. She also played for the Guelph Gators and was on Ontario's under-18 team when they won the U18 field hockey championship in 2017.

During university, Faiczak played for the University of British Columbia Thunderbirds. In 2017, Faiczak and the Thunderbirds won a USports championship.

=== Under–21 ===
Faiczak made her debut for the Canadian U–21 team in 2016, at the Pan American Junior Championship in Tacarigua. The team placed fourth overall.

She represented the team three years later in a four–nations tournament in Dublin.

In 2021, she was a member of the gold medal-winning team at her second Pan American Junior Championship. She was unable to compete with the team in South Africa at the Junior World Cup later that year due to age restrictions.

=== National team ===
Jordyn Faiczak debuted for the national team in 2017 during a test series against Chile and India.

She won her first medal in 2022, taking home bronze at the Pan American Cup in Santiago. Later that year, she was named starting midfielder for the squad for the FIH World Cup in Amsterdam and Terrassa. Faiczak represented Canada at the Commonwealth Games in Birmingham in 2022 and was named to the Canadian team for the Santiago 2023 Pan American Games.
