= Mikayla Stelling =

Canadian field hockey player

Personal information
- Born: 9 November 2003 (age 22) Vancouver, Canada
- Height: 165 cm (5 ft 5 in)
- Weight: 60 kg (132 lb)

Sport
- Sport: Field hockey
- Position: Forward
- Club: University of British Columbia
National team
Years	Team	Caps	Goals
2022–2024	Canada U–21	10	(1)
2023–	Canada	17	(0)
Medal record
Women's field hockey
Representing Canada

Mikayla Stelling (born 9 November 2003) is a field hockey player from Canada.

== Personal life ==
Stelling grew up in Vancouver, a city in British Columbia, Canada.

She is a student at the University of British Columbia, and an alumnus of Little Flower Academy.

== Field hockey ==
=== Domestic league ===
Stelling currently competes for the University of British Columbia in the VWFHA. She also previously represented the Vancouver Hawks.

=== Under–21 ===
From 2022 until 2024, Stelling was a member of the Canada U–21 squad. During her junior career, she represented the team at two major tournaments. She made appearances at the 2022 FIH Junior World Cup in Potchefstroom and the 2024 Pan American Junior Championship in Surrey.

=== Senior national team ===
Stelling received her first call-up to the senior national squad in 2023. She made her senior international debut that year, in a test match against the United States in Charlotte.

She continued to represent the national team in 2024. She was named in the squad for a European tour through June and July. During this tour, she appeared in a test series against Scotland in Glasgow, and at the 2023–24 FIH Nations Cup in Terrassa.

In 2025, she was again named in the national squad for her second FIH Nations Cup in Santiago. She has also been named in the squad for the 2025 Pan American Cup in Montevideo.
