= Leah Crouse =

American field hockey player

Personal information
- Born: February 22, 2000 (age 26) Virginia Beach, Virginia, U.S.
- Height: 5 ft 7 in (170 cm)

Sport
- Sport: Field hockey
- Position: Forward
National team
Years	Team	Caps	Goals
2021–2022	United States U–22	10	(0)
2022–	United States	29	(3)
Medal record
Women's field hockey
Representing United States
Pan American Games
Silver medal – second place	2023 Santiago	Team
Pan American Cup
Silver medal – second place	2025 Montevideo
Pan American Junior Championship
Bronze medal – third place	2021 Santiago

Leah Crouse (/ˈliːə ˈkraʊs/ LEE-ə KROWSS; born February 22, 2000) is an American field hockey player, who plays as a midfielder and forward.

== Personal life ==
Leah Crouse was born in Virginia Beach, Virginia.

Crouse is a student of the University of Maryland.

== Career ==
=== Under–22 ===
Crouse made her debut for the United States U–22 side at the 2021 Pan American Junior Championship in Santiago, where she won a bronze medal.

She also represented the team at the 2022 FIH Junior World Cup in Potchefstroom.

=== Senior national team ===
Crouse made her senior international debut in 2022 during season three of the FIH Pro League.

In 2023, Crouse won her first medal with the national team, taking home silver at the 2023 Pan American Games in Santiago.

She has been named in the squad for the 2024 FIH Olympic Qualifiers in Ranchi.
