= Audrey Sawers =

Canadian field hockey player

Personal information
- Full name: Audrey Joan Sawers
- Born: 22 November 1999 (age 26) Vancouver, British Columbia, Canada

Sport
- Sport: Field hockey
- Position: Midfield
Senior career
| Years | Team | Caps | Goals |
| 2024– | Ulster University Elks | - | - |
National team
| Years | Team | Caps | Goals |
| 2019–2019 | Canada U–21 | 4 | (0) |
| 2021– | Canada | 37 | (2) |
Medal record
Women's field hockey
Representing Canada
Pan American Cup
| Bronze medal – third place | 2022 Santiago | Team |

Audrey Joan Sawers (born 22 November 1999) is a field hockey player from Canada.

== Personal life ==
Audrey Sawers was born in Vancouver, and grew up in the suburb of North Vancouver.

She studied at Lafayette College.

== Field hockey ==
=== Domestic ===
Sawers is currently playing in the Irish Hockey League for the Ulster University Elks.

=== International ===
Sawers made her senior international debut in 2021. She earned her first cap in a test match against the United States in Charlotte.

In 2022 she was a member of Canada's historic bronze medal-winning team at the Pan American Cup in Santiago. The bronze medal secured Canada's qualification to the FIH World Cup for the first time in 28 years. Sawers went on to compete at the FIH World Cup held in Terrassa and Amsterdam, with the squad ultimately finishing in last place. She also went on to represent Team Canada at the XXII Commonwealth Games in Birmingham.

She competed at the 2023 Pan American Games in Santiago.

In 2024 she was a member of the Canadian squad that failed to qualify for the 2024 Summer Olympics at the FIH Olympic Qualifiers in Valencia. She returned to Spain later in the year to compete at the 2023–24 FIH Nations Cup in Terrassa.

== Controversies ==
Following the XXII Commonwealth Games, Sawers was involved in a doping incident involving canrenone. This incident resulted in a one-month sanction from the Canadian Centre for Ethics in Sport.

== International goals ==
The following is a list of goals scored by Sawers at international level.

| Goal | Date | Location | Opponent | Score | Result | Competition | Ref. |
|---|---|---|---|---|---|---|---|
| 1 | 30 October 2023 | Centro de Hockey Césped Claudia Schüler, Santiago, Chile | Mexico | 4–0 | 5–0 | 2023 Pan American Games | |
| 2 | 18 January 2024 | Estadio Beteró, Valencia, Spain | Ukraine | 2–0 | 2–0 | 2024 FIH Olympic Qualifiers | |
