= Lourdes Pisthón =

Argentine field hockey player (born 2007)

Personal information
- Full name: Lourdes Pisthón Santos
- Born: 27 December 2007 (age 18) Buenos Aires, Argentina

Sport
- Sport: Field hockey
- Position: Forward
- Club: Banco Nación
National team
Years	Team	Caps	Goals
2024–	Argentina U–21	25	(11)
2024–	Argentina	19	(9)
Medal record
Women's field hockey
Representing Argentina
South American Games
Gold medal – first place	2026 Santa Fe
FIH Junior World Cup
Silver medal – second place	2025 Santiago	Team
Junior Pan American Games
Gold medal – first place	2025 Asunción	Team
Pan American Junior Championship
Gold medal – first place	2024 Surrey	Team
Gold medal – first place	2026 Santiago	Team

Lourdes Pisthón Santos (born 27 December 2007) is an Argentine field hockey player.

== Early life ==
Lourdes Pisthón grew up in Buenos Aires.

Her sister, Pilar, was an Argentine international player, in the 2025 Junior Pan American Games.

== Career ==
=== Under–21 ===
Pisthón made her international debut at under-21 level, making her first appearance in 2024. She debuted for the Argentine U–21 team at the Pan American Junior Championship in Surrey, winning a gold medal.

=== Las Leonas ===
In 2024, Pisthón received her first call-up to the national squad. She made her debut for Las Leonas during the home leg of season six of the FIH Pro League in Santiago del Estero. Since her debut, she has continued to represent the national squad in 2025.
