= 2005 Women's Pan-Am Junior Championship =

Field hockey tournament

Women's Junior Pan-Am Championship
Tournament details
- Host country: Puerto Rico
- City: San Juan
- Dates: 16–27 March
- Teams: 12 (from 1 confederation)
- Venue: Parque Baldrich

Final positions
- Champions: Argentina (5th title)
- Runner-up: United States
- Third place: Chile

Tournament statistics
- Matches played: 42
- Goals scored: 240 (5.71 per match)
- Top scorer: (Chile) Carolina García (11 goals)
- Best player: (United States) Rachel Dawson
- Best goalkeeper: (Mexico) Jesus Castillo

The 2005 Women's Junior Pan-Am Championship was the 5th edition of the Women's Pan American Junior Championship. It was held from 16 – 27 March 2005 in San Juan, Puerto Rico.

The tournament served as a qualifier for the 2005 Junior World Cup, held in Santiago, Chile in September 2005.

Argentina won the tournament for the 5th time, defeating the United States 3–1 in the final. Chile won the bronze medal by defeating Canada 2–1 in the third and fourth place playoff.

== Participating nations ==
A total of twelve teams participated in the tournament:

- Argentina
- Barbados
- Bermuda
- Canada
- Chile
- Dominican Republic
- Jamaica
- Mexico
- Puerto Rico
- Trinidad and Tobago
- United States
- Uruguay

== Results ==
=== First round ===
==== Pool A ====
Pos	Team	Pld	W	D	L	GF	GA	GD	Pts	Qualification
1	Argentina	5	5	0	0	53	0	+53	15	Semi-finals
2	Chile	5	4	0	1	30	5	+25	12	Semi-finals
3	Mexico	5	3	0	2	20	10	+10	9	
4	Jamaica	5	2	0	3	4	20	−16	6	
5	Trinidad and Tobago	5	1	0	4	8	17	−9	3	
6	Dominican Republic	5	0	0	5	0	63	−63	0	

Source: PanAmHockey
Rules for classification: 1) points; 2) goal difference; 3) goals scored; 4) head-to-head result.

16 March 2005
08:00

Chile	6 – 0	Jamaica
García 9', 33', 43', 62'; C. Infante 28', 44'	Report

Umpires:
Caroline Brunekreef (NED)
Emma Simmons (BER)

16 March 2005
10:00

Mexico	15 – 0	Dominican Republic
Valdes de la Cruz 5', 18'; Cota 7', 43'; Aguilera 12', 68'; Navarro 23', 38'; Guzman 26', 44', 53', 58', 66', 69'; Flores 48'	Report

Umpires:
Lurah Hess (USA)
Ayanna McLean (TTO)

16 March 2005
12:00

Trinidad and Tobago	0 – 8	Argentina
	Report	Luchetti 3'; Garcia 6'; Mejico 27'; D'Elia 30', 67'; Garmendia 33', 39', 46'

Umpires:
Rosario Ardanaz (URU)
Erica May (JAM)

17 March 2005
08:00

Dominican Republic	0 – 8	Trinidad and Tobago
	Report	Lewis 10'; Thompson 19', 35', 44'; Chandler 28'; Layne 50'; James 52'; Williams 68'

Umpires:
Leslie Austin (BAR)
Caroline Brunekreef (NED)

17 March 2005
10:00

Argentina	4 – 0	Chile
Silva 8'; Rebecchi 25'; Garmendia 40'; Garcia 45'	Report

Umpires:
Lurah Hess (USA)
Wendy Stewart (CAN)

17 March 2005
12:00

Jamaica	0 – 2	Mexico
	Report	Guzman 62'; Navarro 65'

Umpires:
Christiane Hippler (GER)
Nadia Gallardo (ARG)

19 March 2005
14:00

Argentina	21 – 0	Dominican Republic
Cerutti 3', 45'; Domínguez 6', 32'; Garmendia 8', 44', 50'; Maloberti 20', 42'; D'Elia 25', 28', 36', 46', 58', 60'; Mejico 37', 68'; Pallitto 56', 64'; Bouza 62'; Diez 66'	Report

Umpires:
Ayanna McLean (TTO)
Leslie Austin (BAR)

19 March 2005
16:00

Trinidad and Tobago	0 – 1	Jamaica
	Report	Reid 46'

Umpires:
Wendy Stewart (CAN)
Emma Simmons (BER)

19 March 2005
18:00

Mexico	1 – 2	Chile
Navarro 47'	Report	Donoso 12'; García 22'

Umpires:
Caroline Brunekreef (NED)
Beatriz Mongelos (PAR)

20 March 2005
14:00

Dominican Republic	0 – 16	Chile
	Report	Fernandez 5'; Thiermann 11'; García 24', 27', 65'; C. Infante 29', 34', 38', 46', 54'; Fingerhuth 31', 33'; Albertz 39', 55'; Donoso 59'; Cabargas 68'

Umpires:
Wendy Stewart (CAN)
Alicia Takeda Hirata (MEX)

20 March 2005
16:00

Jamaica	0 – 12	Argentina
	Report	Domínguez 4', 26'; Garmendia 16', 42', 65'; Silva 27'; Diez 31'; Bouza 32', 34', 37', 48'; Maloberti 51'

Umpires:
Leslie Austin (BAR)
Ayanna McLean (TTO)

20 March 2005
18:00

Trinidad and Tobago	0 – 2	Mexico
	Report	Arvayo 35'; Valdes de la Cruz 61'

Umpires:
Beatriz Mongelos (PAR)
Lurah Hess (USA)

22 March 2005
08:00

Mexico	0 – 8	Argentina
	Report	Maloberti 8', 20', 24', 61'; Aguirre 40'; Garcia 42'; Rebecchi 68'; Mejico 70'

Umpires:
Wendy Stewart (CAN)
Ayanna McLean (TTO)

22 March 2005
12:00

Dominican Republic	0 – 3	Jamaica
	Report	Shak. Elliott 14', 30'; Clarke 70'

Umpires:
Nadia Gallardo (ARG)
Nor Piza Hassan (MAS)

22 March 2005
16:00

Chile	6 – 0	Trinidad and Tobago
García 15', 68'; Caram 35'; Sclabos 47'; D. Infante 57'; Thiermann 62'	Report

Umpires:
Emma Simmons (BER)
Lurah Hess (USA)

==== Pool B ====
Pos	Team	Pld	W	D	L	GF	GA	GD	Pts	Qualification
1	United States	5	5	0	0	28	0	+28	15	Semi-finals
2	Canada	5	4	0	1	27	2	+25	12	Semi-finals
3	Uruguay	5	3	0	2	15	6	+9	9	
4	Barbados	5	2	0	3	16	12	+4	6	
5	Bermuda	5	1	0	4	4	24	−20	3	
6	Puerto Rico	5	0	0	5	0	46	−46	0	

Source: PanAmHockey
Rules for classification: 1) points; 2) goal difference; 3) goals scored; 4) head-to-head result.

16 March 2005
14:00

Barbados	2 – 0	Bermuda
Brewster 23'; Davis 46'	Report

Umpires:
Alicia Takeda Hirata (MEX)
Wendy Stewart (CAN)

16 March 2005
17:00

Uruguay	0 – 2	United States
	Report	Crandall 18'; Dawson 32'

Umpires:
Nadia Gallardo (ARG)
Christiane Hippler (GER)

16 March 2005
19:00

Canada	15 – 0	Puerto Rico
Rushton 2'; Michaluk 7', 32', 33', 64'; Culley 15', 43', 55', 61'; Baker 16', 25', 68'; Mann 20'; Denys 35'; Carbery 41'	Report

Umpires:
Nor Piza Hassan (MAS)
Beatriz Mongelos (PAR)

17 March 2005
14:00

United States	6 – 0	Barbados
Grant 4', 21'; Crandall 22', 47'; O'Donnell 38', 70'	Report

Umpires:
Ayanna McClean (TTO)
Nor Piza Hassan (MAS)

17 March 2005
16:00

Bermuda	0 – 8	Canada
	Report	Culley 3', 32', 63'; Anderson 7'; Denys 31', 49', 53', 61'

Umpires:
Alicia Takeda Hirata (MEX)
Beatriz Mongelos (PAR)

17 March 2005
18:00

Puerto Rico	0 – 7	Uruguay
	Report	Dupont 4', 49'; Ibarra 16'; Mondelli 26'; Altieri 31'; Algorta 51'; Lecueder 57'

Umpires:
Emma Simmons (BER)
Erica May (JAM)

19 March 2005
08:00

Canada	0 – 1	United States
	Report	Crandall 39'

Umpires:
Christiane Hippler (GER)
Nor Piza Hassan (MAS)

19 March 2005
10:00

Uruguay	3 – 2	Barbados
Gibernau 16'; Ibarra 42'; Dupont 52'	Report	King 47', 57'

Umpires:
Lurah Hess (USA)
Alicia Takeda Hirata (MEX)

19 March 2005
12:00

Bermuda	3 – 0	Puerto Rico
Stubbs 41'; Cacace 53'; Frith 65'	Report

Umpires:
Rosario Ardanaz (URU)
Nadia Gallardo (ARG)

20 March 2005
08:00

Barbados	11 – 0	Puerto Rico
King 16', 37', 47'; Jordan 18'; Clarke 20', 42'; Warner 23', 59'; Davis 40', 62', 66'	Report

Umpires:
Rosario Ardanaz (URU)
Erica May (JAM)

20 March 2005
10:00

United States	9 – 0	Bermuda
Dawson 3', 58'; O'Donnell 15'; Beans 22'; Crandall 24'; Schnepf 34'; Falgowski 42', 55'; Link 48'	Report

Umpires:
Nor Piza Hassan (MAS)
Nadia Gallardo (ARG)

20 March 2005
12:00

Canada	1 – 0	Uruguay
Mann 39'	Report

Umpires:
Caroline Brunekreef (NED)
Emma Simmons (BER)

22 March 2005
10:00

Uruguay	5 – 1	Bermuda
Sanguinetti 30'; Ibarra 35'; Dupont 37'; Gibernau 43'; Mondelli 58'	Report	Frith 26'

Umpires:
Caroline Brunekreef (NED)
Christiane Hippler (GER)

22 March 2005
14:00

Puerto Rico	0 – 10	United States
	Report	Grant 6', 15'; Link 20', 25'; Fox 22'; Dawson 33'; Beans 36'; Crandall 41'; Hillman 57'; Falgowski 59'

Umpires:
Rosario Ardanaz (URU)
Erica May (JAM)

22 March 2005
18:00

Barbados	1 – 3	Canada
Davis 48'	Report	Culley 44'; Flexman 59'; Anderson 69'

Umpires:
Beatriz Mongelos (PAR)
Alicia Takeda Hirata (MEX)

=== Second round ===
==== Ninth to twelfth place classification ====
Crossover
23 March 2005
Trinidad & Tobago	5
Puerto Rico	0
23 March 2005
Dominican Republic	0
Bermuda	2

Ninth place
26 March 2005
Trinidad & Tobago	3
Bermuda	0
Eleventh place
26 March 2005
Puerto Rico (p.s.o)	0 (4)
Dominican Republic	0 (3)

==== Fifth to eighth place classification ====
Crossover
24 March 2005
Mexico	4
Barbados	1
24 March 2005
Jamaica	0
Uruguay	2

Fifth place
27 March 2005
Mexico (p.s.o)	0 (3)
Uruguay	0 (1)
Seventh place
26 March 2005
Barbados	3
Jamaica	0

==== First to fourth place classification ====
Semi-finals
24 March 2005
Argentina	3
Canada	2
24 March 2005
Chile	1
United States	2

Final
27 March 2005
Argentina	3
United States	1
Third place
27 March 2005
Canada	1
Chile	2

===== Semi-finals =====
24 March 2005
13:00

Argentina	3 – 2	Canada
Garcia 34'; D'Elia 37'; Maloberti 64'	Report	Denys 4'; Culley 23'

Umpires:
Lurah Hess (USA)
Emma Simmons (BER)

24 March 2005
15:00

Chile	1 – 2	United States
García 68'	Report	Grant 26', 50'

Umpires:
Nor Piza Hassan (MAS)
Caroline Brunekreef (NED)

===== Third and fourth place =====
27 March 2005
11:30

Canada	1 – 2	Chile
Denys 40'	Report	Carvajal 24'; C. Infante 27'

Umpires:
Lurah Hess (USA)
Christiane Hippler (GER)

===== Final =====
27 March 2005
14:00

Argentina	3 – 1	United States
Maloberti 18'; Rebecchi 37'; Luchetti 60'	Report	Hillman 66'

Umpires:
Wendy Stewart (CAN)
Nor Piza Hassan (MAS)

== Statistics ==
=== Final standings ===
1. Argentina
2. United States
3. Chile
4. Canada
5. Mexico
6. Uruguay
7. Barbados
8. Jamaica
9. Trinidad and Tobago
10. Bermuda
11. Puerto Rico
12. Dominican Republic
