= Sara Goodman =

Canadian field hockey player (born 1999)

Personal information
- Born: 22 October 1999 (age 26) Duncan, British Columbia
- Height: 175 cm (5 ft 9 in)

Sport
- Sport: Field hockey
- Position: Defender
National team
Years	Team	Caps	Goals
2016–2021	Canada U–21	14	(2)
2018–	Canada	19	(0)
Medal record
Women's field hockey
Representing Canada
Pan American Cup
Bronze medal – third place	2022 Santiago	Team
Pan American Junior Championship
Gold medal – first place	2021 Santiago	Team

Sara Goodman (born 22 October 1999) is a Canadian field hockey player.

== Personal life ==
Sara Goodman was born and raised in Duncan, British Columbia.

== Career ==
=== Under–21 ===
Goodman made her debut for the Canadian U–21 team in 2016, at the Pan American Junior Championship in Tacarigua.

She represented the team three years later in a four–nations tournament in Dublin.

In 2021, she captained the team to a gold medal at her second Pan American Junior Championship.

=== National team ===
Sara Goodman debuted for the national team in 2018 during a test series against Chile in Santiago.

She won her first medal in 2022, taking home bronze at the Pan American Cup in Santiago.
