= 2021 Women's Junior Pan American Championship =

Field hockey tournament

Tournament details
- Host country: Chile
- City: Santiago
- Dates: 21–28 August
- Teams: 6 (from 1 confederation)
- Venue: Prince of Wales Country Club

Final positions
- Champions: Canada (1st title)
- Runner-up: Uruguay
- Third place: United States

Tournament statistics
- Matches played: 11
- Goals scored: 46 (4.18 per match)
- Top scorer: (United States) Charlotte de Vries (5 goals)
- Best player: (United States) Hope Rose

The 2021 Women's Junior Pan American Championship was the 12th edition of the Women's Pan American Junior Championship, the women's international under-21 field hockey championship of the Americas organized by the Pan American Hockey Federation.

The tournament was held alongside the men's tournament at the Prince of Wales Country Club in Santiago, Chile and was originally scheduled to take place from 30 November to 13 December 2020. On 29 May 2020 the Pan American Hockey Federation announced that the tournament was rescheduled and would take place from 12 to 25 April 2021. Later on 15 January, it was announced that the competition would take place from 22 to 28 August 2021.

Argentina were the defending champions, winning the 2016 edition. This tournament served as the Pan American qualifier for the 2021 FIH Junior World Cup, with the top three qualifying.

== Squads ==
Argentina

Head Coach: Rolando Rivero

1. María Moretti (GK)
2. Sol Alías
3. Lucía Ponce
4. Anna Goldstein
5. María del Carril
6. María Lorenzini
7. Josefina Nardi (C)
9. Amparo Correa
10. Sofía Ramallo
11. Emilia Bazzana
15. Malena Cerviño
16. Candela Nobile
17. Luciana Belizon
18. Julieta Milazzotto
20. Martina Gabutti
21. Sol Guignet
22. Martina Giacchino
26. Agustina Benedetti (GK)
Canada

Head Coach: (South Africa) Patrick Tshutshani

2. Ishaval Sekhon (GK)
3. Stefanie Sajko
4. Madison Workman
5. Katie Lynes
6. Anna Mollenhauer
7. Jordyn Faiczak
8. Rebecca Carvalho
10. Thora Rae
11. Nora Struchtrup
12. Sara Goodman (C)
13. Bronwyn Bird
14. Samantha McCrory
16. Melanie Scholz
17. Danielle Husar
19. Jenna Berger
20. Julia Ross
21. Nora Goddard-Despot
33. Lucy Wheeler (GK)
Chile

Head Coach: Emiliano Monteleone

1. Rosario Lanz (GK)
3. Paula Sanz
4. Amanda Martínez
5. Francisca Parra (C)
6. Valeria Nazal
7. Dominga Lüders
8. Micaela Stockins
9. Fernanda Arrieta
10. Simone Avelli
11. Michelle de Witt
12. Antonia Irazoqui
15. Constanza Jugo
16. Carolina Mujíca
17. Francisca Irazoqui
18. Fernanda Ramírez
19. Constanza Péres
21. Milagros Gago
24. Antonia Sáez (GK)
Trinidad and Tobago

Head Coach: Emiliano Monteleone

2. Jamie James (GK)
3. Chelsea Dey
4. Tahirah Wynne
6. Felicia King (C)
7. Shaniah de Freitas (C)
8. Naomi Sampson
9. Aaliyah O'Neil
10. Mia Oltero
11. Saarah Olton
14. Nicole Whiteman
16. Shania Gajadhar
17. T'Shana Chance
18. Rebekah Ngui
20. Samantha Olton
21. Kaitlyn Olton
24. Shaniqua Paul
26. Talia Seale (GK)
31. Adrianna Camps
United States

Head Coach: Tracey Paul

2. Ashley Sessa
3. Kathryn Peterson
4. Charlotte de Vries
5. Emma DeBerdine
6. Hope Rose
7. Lindsay Dickinson
8. Sofía Southam
9. Madeleine Zimmer
10. Leah Crouse
11. Kayla Blas
12. Lauren Wadas
13. Abigail Tamer
14. Gracyn Banks
15. Skyler Caron
16. Riley Donnelly
18. Alia Marshall (C)
21. Gianna Glatz (GK)
30. Annabel Skubisz (GK)
Uruguay

Head Coach: Andrés Vázquez

1. Guilermina Borrazas (GK)
4. Florencia Peñalba
5. Pilar Oliveros
6. Elisa Civetta
7. Agustina Martínez
8. Cecilia León
9. Magdalena Verda
10. Manuela Quiñones
11. María Barreiro
12. Lucía Santucci
13. Guadalupe Curutchague
17. Manuela Vidal
21. Josefina Esposto
22. Agustina Suárez
23. Manuela Serra
24. Carolina Curico
27. Jimena García (C)
32. María Bate (GK)

== Preliminary round ==
=== Pool A ===
Pos	Team	Pld	W	D	L	GF	GA	GD	Pts	Qualification
1	Canada	2	1	1	0	1	0	+1	4	Semi-finals
2	Uruguay	2	0	2	0	0	0	0	2	Semi-finals
3	Argentina	2	0	1	1	0	1	−1	1	

Source: FIH
Rules for classification: 1) points; 2) matches won; 3) goal difference; 4) goals for; 5) head-to-head result; 6) field goals for.

21 August 2021
12:00

Uruguay	0–0	Canada
	Report

Umpires:
Catalina Montesino (CHI)
Morgan Ames (USA)

23 August 2021
10:00

Argentina	0–0	Uruguay
	Report

Umpires:
Catalina Montesino (CHI)
Claudia Montino (CHI)

24 August 2021
08:00

Canada	1–0	Argentina
Goodman 30'	Report

Umpires:
Morgan Ames (USA)
Claudia Montino (CHI)

=== Pool B ===
Pos	Team	Pld	W	D	L	GF	GA	GD	Pts	Qualification
1	United States	2	2	0	0	17	1	+16	6	Semi-finals
2	Chile (H)	2	1	0	1	12	2	+10	3	Semi-finals
3	Trinidad and Tobago	2	0	0	2	0	26	−26	0	

Source: FIH
Rules for classification: 1) points; 2) matches won; 3) goal difference; 4) goals for; 5) head-to-head result; 6) field goals for.
(H) Hosts

22 August 2021
12:00

Chile	1–2	United States
Martínez 12'	Report	Wadas 1'; Southam 18'

Umpires:
Natalia Lodeiro (URU)
Joanne Wudrich (CAN)

23 August 2021
12:00

United States	15–0	Trinidad and Tobago
Zimmer 4'; Southam 5', 52'; Rose 7', 27', 44'; De Vries 10', 37', 39', 45+', 56'; Sessa 13', 15', 54'; Tamer 51'	Report

Umpires:
Natalia Lodeiro (URU)
Melina Illanes (ARG)

24 August 2021
12:00

Trinidad and Tobago	0–11	Chile
	Report	Arrieta 4', 33'; Ramírez 10', 45'; Jugo 10'; Avelli 12', 42', 51'; A. Irazoqui 23'; Lüders 37'; Mújica 39'

Umpires:
Melina Illanes (ARG)
Joanne Wudrich (CAN)

== Classification round ==
=== Fifth place game ===
26 August 2021
12:00

Argentina	11–0	Trinidad and Tobago
Bazzana 2', 3', 55', 57'; Gabutti 17'; Del Carril 32', 50'; Guignet 41'; Correa 50', 56'; Giacchino 59'	Report

Umpires:
Claudia Montino (CHI)
Oliver Hock (BRA)

=== First to fourth place classification ===
Semi-finals
26 August
Canada	1
Chile	0
26 August
United States	0
Uruguay	1

Final
28 August
Canada	1
Uruguay	0
Third place
28 August
Chile	1 (2)
United States (s.o.)	1 (3)

==== Semi-finals ====
26 August 2021
14:00

United States	0–1	Uruguay
	Report	Barreiro 51'

Umpires:
Catalina Montesino (CHI)
Melina Illanes (ARG)

26 August 2021
16:00

Canada	1–0	Chile
Rae 28'	Report

Umpires:
Natalia Lodeiro (URU)
Morgan Ames (USA)

==== Third place game ====
28 August 2021
10:00

Chile	1–1	United States
Arrieta 16'	Report	Caron 2'
Penalties
Gago (penalty shoot-out scored); Avelli (penalty shoot-out scored); F. Irazoqui (penalty shoot-out missed); Arrieta (penalty shoot-out missed); Lüders (penalty shoot-out missed)	2–3	(penalty shoot-out missed) Zimmer; (penalty shoot-out scored) De Vries; (penalty shoot-out missed) Sessa; (penalty shoot-out scored) Crouse; (penalty shoot-out scored) Donnelly

Umpires:
Natalia Lodeiro (URU)
Melina Illanes (ARG)

==== Final ====
28 August 2021
12:00

Canada	1–0	Uruguay
Mollenhauer 53'	Report

Umpires:
Catalina Montesino (CHI)
Morgan Ames (USA)

== Statistics ==
=== Final standings ===
Pos	Team	Qualification
1	Canada	2021 Junior World Cup
2	Uruguay	2021 Junior World Cup
3	United States	2021 Junior World Cup
4	Chile (H)	
5	Argentina	
6	Trinidad and Tobago	

Source: FIH
(H) Host

=== Awards ===
The following awards were given at the conclusion of the tournament.

Player of the tournament	Goalkeeper of the tournament	Top goalscorer
(United States) Hope Rose	(Uruguay) María Bate	(United States) Charlotte de Vries

=== Goalscorers ===
There were 46 goals scored in 11 matches, for an average of 4.18 goals per match.

5 goals

- (United States) Charlotte de Vries

4 goals

- (Argentina) Emilia Bazzana

3 goals

- (Chile) Fernanda Arrieta
- (Chile) Simone Avelli
- (United States) Hope Rose
- (United States) Ashley Sessa
- (United States) Sofia Southam

2 goals

- (Argentina) Amparo Correa
- (Argentina) María del Carril
- (Chile) Fernanda Ramírez

1 goal

- (Argentina) Martina Gabutti
- (Argentina) Martina Giacchino
- (Argentina) Sol Guignet
- (Canada) Sara Goodman
- (Canada) Anna Mollenhauer
- (Canada) Thora Rae
- (Chile) Antonia Irazoqui
- (Chile) Constanza Jugo
- (Chile) Dominga Lüders
- (Chile) Amanda Martínez
- (Chile) Carolina Mújica
- (United States) Skyler Caron
- (United States) Abigail Tamer
- (United States) Lauren Wadas
- (United States) Madeleine Zimmer
- (Uruguay) María Barreiro

Source: FIH

== See also ==
- 2021 Men's Junior Pan American Championship
