= Anna Mollenhauer =

Canadian field hockey player

Personal information
- Full name: Anna Margaret Mollenhauer
- Born: 18 September 1999 (age 26) Victoria, British Columbia
- Height: 179 cm (5 ft 10 in)

Sport
- Sport: Field hockey
- Position: Defender / Midfielder
- Club: Vikes FHC
National team
Years	Team	Caps	Goals
2019–	Canada	20	(0)
2021–	Canada U–21	4	(1)
Medal record
Women's field hockey
Representing Canada
Pan American Games
Silver medal – second place	2019 Lima	Team
Pan American Cup
Bronze medal – third place	2022 Santiago
Pan American Junior Championship
Gold medal – first place	2021 Santiago

Anna Margaret Mollenhauer (born 18 September 1999) is a field hockey player from Canada, who plays as a midfielder.

== Personal life ==
Anna Mollenhauer was born and raised in Victoria, British Columbia. Her mother, Nancy, was also a Canadian international field hockey player.

Mollenhauer is a student at the University of Victoria and now is studying her masters at Ulster University in Northern Ireland and playing for Ulster University Elks Hockey Club #ETID.

== Career ==
=== Junior national team ===
In 2021, Mollenhauer made her debut for the Canada U–21 team at the Pan American Junior Championship in Santiago. She won a gold medal at the tournament, scoring the winning goal in the final.

=== Senior national team ===
Mollenhauer made her debut for the Canadian senior team in 2019, during a test series against China in Panzhihua. 2019 proved to be a successful year for Mollenhauer, as she won silver medals at both the FIH Series Finals in Valencia, and the Pan American Games in Lima.
