= Thora Rae =

Uruguayan field and indoor hockey player

Personal information
- Born: 15 October 1999 (age 26) Vancouver, British Columbia, Canada
- Height: 170 cm (5 ft 7 in)

Sport
- Sport: Field hockey
- Position: Forward
National team
Years	Team	Caps	Goals
2016–	Canada	18	(4)
2019–2021	Canada U–21	8	(1)
Medal record
Representing Canada
Women's field hockey
Pan American Cup
Bronze medal – third place	2022 Santiago	Team
Pan American Junior Championship
Gold medal – first place	2021 Santiago	Team

Thora Rae (born 15 October 1999) is a field hockey player from Canada.

== Personal life ==
Thora Rae was born and raised in Vancouver, British Columbia. She is a student at the University of British Columbia.

== Career ==
=== Under–21 ===
Thora Rae debuted for the Canada U–21 team in 2019 during a four–nations tournament in Dublin.

In 2021, Rae appeared in the team again at the Pan American Junior Championship in Santiago. At the tournament, Rae won a gold medal with the team, scoring once and securing qualification to the FIH Junior World Cup.

=== Senior national team ===
Rae made her senior international debut in 2016, during a test series against New Zealand in Hamilton.

In 2022 Rae was named to the national squad for the first time. In January, she represented the team at the Pan American Cup in Santiago, where she won a bronze medal.

==== International goals ====
Goal	Date	Location	Opponent	Score	Result	Competition	Ref.
1	26 November 2021	United States Olympic Training Center, Chula Vista, United States	United States	2–0	2–0	Test Match	
2	23 January 2022	Prince of Wales Country Club, Santiago, Chile	Trinidad and Tobago	5–0	13–0	2022 Pan American Cup	
3	23 January 2022	Prince of Wales Country Club, Santiago, Chile	Trinidad and Tobago	6–0	13–0	2022 Pan American Cup	
4	23 January 2022	Prince of Wales Country Club, Santiago, Chile	Trinidad and Tobago	13–0	13–0	2022 Pan American Cup	
