= 2026 Women's Junior Pan American Cup =

Field hockey tournament

2026 Women's Junior Pan American Championship
Tournament details
- Host country: Chile
- City: Santiago
- Dates: 6–18 April
- Teams: 6 (from 1 confederation)
- Venue(s): Centro Deportivo de Hockey Césped, Estadio Nacional

Final positions
- Champions: Argentina (9th title)
- Runner-up: United States
- Third place: Uruguay

Tournament statistics
- Matches played: 20
- Goals scored: 88 (4.4 per match)
- Top scorer: (Argentina) Chiara Ambrosini (16 goals)

The 2026 Women's Junior Pan American Championship was the 12th edition of the Women's Pan American Junior Championship, the biennial women's international under-21 field hockey championship of the Americas, organised by the Pan American Hockey Federation. It was held alongside the men's tournament from 6 to 18 April 2026 at Centro Deportivo de Hockey Césped, Estadio Nacional in Santiago, Chile.

The Tournament also served as a qualification for the 2027 Women's FIH Hockey Junior World Cup, with the top five teams qualifying.

== Teams ==
- Argentina
- Canada
- Chile
- Mexico
- Uruguay
- United States

== Preliminary round ==
All times are local (UTC-7)

=== Pool A ===
Pos	Team	Pld	W	D	L	GF	GA	GD	Pts	Qualification
1	Argentina	5	5	0	0	29	2	+27	15	Semi-finals
2	United States	5	3	0	2	24	7	+17	9	Semi-finals
3	Uruguay	5	3	0	2	9	7	+2	9	Semi-finals
4	Chile (H)	5	2	1	2	5	5	0	7	Semi-finals
5	Canada	5	1	1	3	3	17	−14	4	
6	Mexico	5	0	0	5	0	32	−32	0	

Source: FIH
Rules for classification: 1) points; 2) matches won; 3) goal difference; 4) goals for; 5) head-to-head result; 6) field goals for.
(H) Hosts

=== Fixtures ===
6 April 2026
15:00

Argentina	11–0	Mexico
Ambrosini 3', 6', 42'; Holmgren 9', 45'; Raposo 11'; Olalla 18'; Robles 25'; Raimondo 28'; Iudicello 30'; Pisthón 33'	Report

Umpires:
Katelyn Makovec (USA)
Meghan McLennan (CAN)

6 April 2026
17:00

United States	5–0	Canada
D'Ariano 10', 28', 30'; M. Beach 43'; Anetsberger 60'	Report

Umpires:
Catalina Wenzel(CHI)
Macarena Dieni (ARG)

7 April 2026
18:00

Uruguay	1–0	Chile
Curcio 41'	Report

Umpires:
Nora Struchtrup (CAN)
Alejandra Pasillas (MEX)

8 April 2026
16:00

Argentina	8–1	Canada
Ambrosini 15+', 17', 21', 49'; Peralta 26'; Duportal 30'; Iudicello 48'; Raimondo 55'	Report	Le 47'

Umpires:
Sofia aleman (URU)
Katelyn Makovec (USA)

8 April 2026
18:00

Mexico	0–3	Uruguay
	Report	Arregui 3'; Martínez 30', 34'

Umpires:
Meghan McLennan (CAN)
Valentina Grau (CHI)

9 April 2026
18:00

United States	1–2	Chile
D'Ariano 59'	Report	Pérez 1'; Carvajal 39'

Umpires:
Macarena Dieni (ARG)
Meghan McLennan (CAN)

10 April 2026
11:00

Mexico	0–13	United States
	Report	D'Ariano 2', 21', 38', 42', 53'; Anetsberger 4'; Sloan 21'; M. Beach 23'; Rigual 32'; Wozniak 35'; Bigbie 35'; Bent-Cole 50'; Masters 60'

Umpires:
Sofia Aleman (URU)
Valentina Grau (CHI)

10 April 2026
17:00

Uruguay	1–2	Argentina
Curcio 58'	Report	Ambrosini 18', 41'

Umpires:
Nora Struchtrup (CAN)
Catalina Wenzel (CHI)

11 April 2026
19:00

Canada	0–0	Chile
	Report

Umpires:
Katelyn Makovec (USA)
Macarena Dieni (ARG)

13 April 2026
12:00

Canada	0–4	Uruguay
	Report	Arregui 4', 51'; Sansalone 24'; Cazet 28'

Umpires:
Alejandra Pasillas (MEX)
Katelyn Makovec (USA)

13 April 2026
14:00

United States	0–5	Argentina
	Report	Raposo 6', 29'; Persoglia 7'; Peralta 14'; Ambrosini 35'

Umpires:
Catalina Wenzel (CHI)
Meghan McLennan (CAN)

13 April 2026
20:00

Chile	3–0	Mexico
Saenz 25'; Escobar 46'; Caravia 59'	Report

Umpires:
Sofia Aleman (URU)
Nora Struchtrup (CAN)

14 April 2026
15:00

Uruguay	0–5	United States
	Report	D'Ariano 15', 47'; Moore 38'; Adams 42'; Gerdeman 54'

Umpires:
Macarena Dieni (ARG)
Catalina Wenzel (CHI)

14 April 2026
17:00

Canada	2–0	Mexico
McGillivray 19'; Le 32'	Report

Umpires:
Valentina Grau (CHI)
Sofia Aleman (URU)

14 April 2026
19:00

Argentina	3–0	Chile
Raposo 2'; Iudicello 5'; Ambrosini 35'	Report

Umpires:
Katelyn Makovec (USA)
Nora Struchtrup (CAN)

== Classification round ==
=== 5th Place ===
18 April 2026
10:15

Canada	4–0	Mexico
Litt 11'; Le 35', 50'; Malinowski 46'	Report

Umpires:
Valentina Grau (CHI)
Sofia Aleman (URU)

== Final round ==
=== Bracket ===
Semi-finals
17 April
Argentina	7
Chile	0
17 April
United States (p.s.o.)	1 (3)
Uruguay	1 (1)

Final
18 April
Argentina	3
United States	1
Third place
18 April
Chile	0
Uruguay	1

=== Semi-finals ===
17 April 2026
16:45

Argentina	7–0	Chile
Iudicello 3', 39'; Ambrosini 10', 36'; Bianchi 47'; Peralta 55'; Duportal 58'	Report

Umpires:
Katelyn Makovec (USA)
Meghan McLennan (CAN)

17 April 2026
19:00

United States	1–1	Uruguay
D'Ariano 35'		Minatta 60'
Penalties
Bigbie (penalty shoot-out scored); D'Ariano (penalty shoot-out scored); Moore (penalty shoot-out missed); Bent-Cole (penalty shoot-out scored)	3–1	(penalty shoot-out missed) Curutchague; (penalty shoot-out scored) Arregui; (penalty shoot-out missed) Martínez; (penalty shoot-out missed) Rodríguez

Umpires:
Catalina Wenzel (CHI)
Macarena Dieni (ARG)

=== Third and fourth place ===
18 April 2026
14:45

Chile	0–1	Uruguay
	Report	Arregui 20'

Umpires:
Macarena Dieni (ARG)
Katelyn Makovec (USA)

=== Finale ===
18 April 2026
19:15

Argentina	3–1	United States
Ambrosini 13', 51', 60'	Report	D'Ariano 14'

Umpires:
Meghan McLennan (CAN)
Catalina Wenzel (CHI)

== Statistics ==
=== Final standings ===
Pos	Team	Qualification
1st place, gold medalist(s)	Argentina	2027 FIH Hockey Junior World Cup
2nd place, silver medalist(s)	United States	2027 FIH Hockey Junior World Cup
3rd place, bronze medalist(s)	Uruguay	2027 FIH Hockey Junior World Cup
4	Chile (H)	2027 FIH Hockey Junior World Cup
5	Canada	2027 FIH Hockey Junior World Cup
6	Mexico	

Source: FIH
(H) Host

=== Goalscorers ===
There were 88 goals scored in 20 matches, for an average of 4.4 goals per match.

16 goals

- (Argentina) Chiara Ambrosini

13 goals

- (United States) Reese D'Ariano

5 goals

- (Argentina) Clarisa Iudicello

4 goals

- (Argentina) Barbara Raposo
- (Canada) Sydney Le
- (Uruguay) Justina Arregui

3 goals

- (Argentina) Luciana Peralta

2 goals

- (Argentina) Maxima Duportal
- (Argentina) Trinidad Holmgren
- (Argentina) Manuela Raimondo
- (United States) Reese Anetsberger
- (United States) Madison Beach
- (Uruguay) Chiara Curcio
- (Uruguay) Sol Martínez

1 goal

- (Argentina) Rocio Bianchi
- (Argentina) Sol Olalla
- (Argentina) Delfina Persoglia
- (Argentina) Lourdes Pisthón
- (Argentina) Pilar Robles
- (Canada) Puneet Litt
- (Canada) Stella Malinowski
- (Canada) Maia McGillivray
- (Chile) Isidora Caravia
- (Chile) Elisa Carvajal
- (Chile) Trinidad Escobar
- (Chile) Dominga Pérez
- (Chile) Javiera Saenz
- (United States) Mary Adams
- (United States) Olivia Bent-Cole
- (United States) Taylor Bigbie
- (United States) Abigail Gerdeman
- (United States) Lauren Masters
- (United States) Ava Moore
- (United States) Sarah Rigual
- (United States) Lauren Sloan
- (United States) Shae Wozniak
- (Uruguay) Camila Minatta
- (Uruguay) Martina Cazet
- (Uruguay) Sofía Sansalone

Source: FIH

== See also ==
- 2026 Men's Junior Pan American Cup
