= Villa Maria College, Christchurch =

Villa Maria College
- Māori: Te Whare o Meri

Location
- 21 Peer Street; Upper Riccarton; Christchurch 8041; New Zealand; 43.5292°S 172.5675°E

Information
- Type: State integrated single-sex girls secondary (year 7–13) school
- Motto: That you may learn to Prize what is of Value
- Established: 1918; 108 years ago
- Ministry of Education Institution no.: 326
- Principal: Deborah Brosnahan
- Enrolment: 829 (July 2026)
- Socio-economic decile: 9Q
- Website: www.villa.school.nz

Villa Maria College (Māori: Te Whare o Meri) is a single-sex secondary school in Christchurch, New Zealand. It was opened on 18 February 1918 with 14 pupils. It was founded by the Sisters of Mercy and served as a parish school when boys were admitted in 1921. From 1941 the school reverted to being a girls' college. Villa Maria College is a day school but it also had boarders between 1935 and 1979. In 1981, the college was integrated into the New Zealand state school system under the Private Schools Conditional Integration Act 1975 but its proprietors remain the Sisters of Mercy (through the Sisters of Mercy Trust Board).

== Honour ==
In the 2001 Birthday Honours, former principal Sister Pauline Margaret O'Regan was made a Distinguished Companion of the New Zealand Order of Merit (DCNZM). She had left the school and the convent in 1973 to work within Christchurch's poorer communities.

== Enrolment ==
As of July 2026, Villa Maria has a roll of 829 students, of which 107 (12.9%) identify as Māori.

As of 2026, the school has an Equity Index of 411, placing it amongst schools whose students have few socioeconomic barriers to achievement (roughly equivalent to deciles 8 and 9 under the former socio-economic decile system).

== Notable alumnae ==
- Jessie Anderson (born 1998), field hockey player
- Ellen Halpenny (born 1990), netball player
- Courtney McGregor (born 1998), representative female artistic gymnast
- Grace Prendergast (born 1992), rower
- Jan Tinetti (born 1968), cabinet member of the Labour Party
