= 2024 Women's Junior Pan American Championship =

Hockey tournament in Surrey, Canada

Tournament details
- Host country: Canada
- City: Surrey
- Dates: 3–12 July
- Teams: 6 (from 1 confederation)
- Venue: Tamanawis Park

Final positions
- Champions: Argentina (8th title)
- Runner-up: United States
- Third place: Chile

Tournament statistics
- Matches played: 20
- Goals scored: 106 (5.3 per match)
- Top scorer: (Argentina) Catalina Stamati (7 goals)
- Best player: (Argentina) Valentina Ferola
- Best goalkeeper: (United States) Alyssa Klebasko

The 2024 Women's Junior Pan American Championship was the 11th edition of the Women's Pan American Junior Championship, the biennial women's international under-21 field hockey championship of the Americas, organised by the Pan American Hockey Federation. It was held alongside the men's tournament from 3 to 12 July 2024 in Surrey, Canada.

Argentina won their eighth title by defeating the defending champions the United States 3–1 in the final. Chile won the bronze medal by defeating Uruguay 1–0. The tournament served as a direct qualifier for the 2025 Junior World Cup, with the top four teams, not already qualified, qualifying. It also served as a qualifier for the 2025 Junior Pan American Games for the top five teams.

== Squads ==
Argentina

Head Coach: Juan Martín López

1. Lucía Ladron de Guevara (GK)
3. Valentina Ferola
5. Victoria Falasco
6. Brisa Ruggeri
7. Ariana Arias
8. Milagros di Santo
11. Pilar Palacio
14. Belén Bazzana
15. Sol Olalla
16. Agustina Miranda
17. Lourdes Pishton
18. Catalina Stamati
23. Pilar Pishton
24. Barbara Raposo
25. Malena Sabez (C)
27. Sol Guignet Guñazu
29. Emma Knobl
32. Mercedes Artola (GK)
Canada

Head Coach: (South Africa) Sheldon Rostron

1. Robyn Goh (GK)
2. Nicole Poulakis
3. Julia Boraston
4. Katherine Gibb
6. Brooke McCusker
7. Shannon Stelling
9. Laine Delmotte (C)
10. Kenzie Girgis
13. Rebecca Stone
15. Calista Schwartz
16. Grace Leahy
17. Mikayla Stelling
18. Stella Malinowski
19. Elise Piper
20. Alicia Lung
21. Rylie Novak
24. Stella Goddard-Despot
29. Kailey Workman (GK)
Chile

Head Coach: Alejandro Gómez

21. Francisca Irazoqui (C)
26. Monserrat Obon
38. Sofía Messen
39. Isabel Oyaban
40. María Goñi
41. Antonia Muñoz
45. Victoria Arrieta
47. Laura Müller
48. Laura Salamanca
49. María Del Valle (GK)
50. Jacinta Solari
51. Isidora Caravia
52. Monserrat Orellana
57. Monsterrat Araya (GK)
58. Florencia Barrios
70. Ignacia Orellana
88. Martina Gago
91. Josefina Gutiérrez
Mexico

Head Coach: San Zuleta

1. Ana López (GK)
2. Samantha López
5. Itzel García
6. America Sosa
7. Dariana Cardiel
8. María Rodríguez
9. Fernanda Guzmán
10. Sofía Pérez
11. Yuritzi Hernández
12. Alondra Pérez
13. Valeria Espinosa
14. Mariel Pereida (GK)
15. Ximena Noria
16. Melanie Crúz
17. Atzhiry Reyes
19. Nancy Castillo
20. Cristina Ortíz
21. Dana Jasso
22. Gala Pérez
24. Nataly Nava
United States

Head Coach: Allan Law

1. Abigail Burnett
2. Ryleigh Heck
3. Mia Schoenbeck
4. Lucy Adams
5. Olivia Bent-Cole
6. Maci Bradford
7. Milaw Clause
8. Daniela Mendez-Trendler
9. Kelly Smith
10. Jans Croon
11. Ava Moore
12. Isabella Bianco
13. Riley Wollerton
16. Mia Myklebust
17. Hope Rose (C)
18. Mia Abello
19. Josie Hollamon
20. Ella Gaitan
96. Natalie McKenna (GK)
97. Alyssa Klebasko (GK)
Uruguay

Head Coach: Rolando Rivero

2. Sol Myszka
4. Elisa Civetta (C)
5. Justina Arregui
6. Guillermina Carassale
7. María Rodríguez
9. Jacinta Curutchague
11. Agustina Díaz
12. Miranda Martínez (GK)
13. Guadalupe Curutchague (C)
16. Josefina Mari
20. Chiara Curcio
24. Carolina Curcio
26. Silvina Bonaudi
30. Milagros Seigal
31. Paula Pérez
33. Pilar Lemoine
34. Sol Martínez
35. Francisca Guani (GK)

== Preliminary round ==
=== Standings ===
Pos	Team	Pld	W	D	L	GF	GA	GD	Pts	Qualification
1	Argentina	5	5	0	0	29	0	+29	15	Semi-finals and 2025 FIH Junior World Cup
2	United States	5	4	0	1	21	8	+13	12	Semi-finals and 2025 FIH Junior World Cup
3	Chile	5	3	0	2	13	9	+4	9	Semi-finals and 2025 FIH Junior World Cup
4	Uruguay	5	2	0	3	17	8	+9	6	Semi-finals and 2025 FIH Junior World Cup
5	Canada (H)	5	1	0	4	5	22	−17	3	
6	Mexico	5	0	0	5	3	41	−38	0	

Source: FIH
Rules for classification: 1) points; 2) matches won; 3) goal difference; 4) goals for; 5) head-to-head result; 6) field goals for.
(H) Hosts

=== Fixtures ===
3 July 2024
10:00

Argentina	12–0	Mexico
Guignet 13', 35', 57'; Miranda 18'; Knobl 20'; L. Pisthón 29'; Ferola 32', 47'; Stamati 48'; Olalla 53'; P. Pisthón 57', 59'	Report

Umpires:
Sofía Aleman (URU)
Pedro Fortes (BRA)

3 July 2024
14:00

United States	2–1	Uruguay
Bent-Cole 34'; Mendez-Trendler 51'	Report	Lemoine 39'

Umpires:
Claudia Montino (CHI)
Nora Struchtrup (CAN)

3 July 2024
18:00

Canada	1–4	Chile
Girgis 57'	Report	Obon 36'; Gutiérrez 49'; Irazoqui 53'; Oyaban 56'

Umpires:
Victoria Pazos (PAR)
Allison Mikelson (USA)

4 July 2024
10:00

Argentina	3–0	Uruguay
Stamati 25', 26'; Ferola 52'	Report

Umpires:
Victoria Pazos (PAR)
Allison Mikelson (USA)

4 July 2024
14:00

United States	4–2	Chile
Rose 7'; Croon 32'; Mendez-Trendler 39'; Gaitan 50'	Report	Solari 8'; Orellana 57'

Umpires:
Ana Vázquez Escalante (MEX)
Pedro Fortes (BRA)

4 July 2024
18:00

Mexico	1–2	Canada
Ortíz 53'	Report	Goddard-Despot 27'; Girgis 49'

Umpires:
Macarena Dieni (ARG)
Claudia Montino (CHI)

6 July 2024
10:00

Mexico	1–11	United States
Espinoza 44'	Report	Abello 2'; Bradford 6', 48'; Bent-Cole 25', 38', 55'; Mendez-Trendler 29'; Croon 32'; Rose 50'; Adams 51'; Moore 55'

Umpires:
Macarena Dieni (ARG)
Sofía Aleman (URU)

6 July 2024
14:00

Chile	2–1	Uruguay
Goñi 39'; Gago 41'	Report	Rodríguez 27'

Umpires:
Nora Struchtrup (CAN)
Allison Mikelson (USA)

6 July 2024
18:00

Canada	0–9	Argentina
	Report	Stamati 2', 43'; P. Pisthón 4'; Knobl 7', 28'; Ruggeri 17'; Ferola 30+'; L. Pisthón 42'; Olalla 49'

Umpires:
Ana Vazquez Escalante (MEX)
Victoria Pazos (PAR)

7 July 2024
10:00

Chile	5–1	Mexico
Salamanca 12'; Solari 46'; Gutiérrez 48'; Arrieta 56'; Oyaban 58'	Report	García 20'

Umpires:
Macarena Dieni (ARG)
Sofía Aleman (URU)

7 July 2024
14:00

United States	0–3	Argentina
	Report	Falasco 2'; P. Pisthón 34'; Ruggeri 49'

Umpires:
Claudia Montino (CHI)
Victoria Pazos (PAR)

7 July 2024
18:00

Uruguay	4–1	Canada
Civetta 16'; Mari 21'; Lemoine 23'; Ca. Curcio 26'	Report	S. Stelling 56'

Umpires:
Allison Mikelson (USA)
Ana Vázquez Escalante (MEX)

9 July 2024
10:00

Argentina	2–0	Chile
P. Pisthón 22'; Sabez 52'	Report

Umpires:
Allison Mikelson (USA)
Nora Struchtrup (CAN)

9 July 2024
14:00

Uruguay	11–0	Mexico
Díaz 6', 46'; Ch. Curcio 7'; Lemoine 7'; Civetta 10', 60'; Ca. Curcio 19', 41'; G. Curutchague 40'; Pérez 41'; Arregui 45'	Report

Umpires:
Macarena Dieni (ARG)
Claudia Montino (CHI)

9 July 2024
18:00

Canada	1–4	United States
Malinowski 38'	Report	Heck 30+'; Schoenbeck 32'; Adams 38'; Myklebust 40'

Umpires:
Victoria Pazos (PAR)
Sofia Aleman (URU)

== Classification round ==
=== Fifth and sixth place ===
10 July 2024
11:15

Canada	6–0	Mexico
Leahy 18', 34'; McCusker 26'; Poulakis 44'; M. Stelling 58'; Girgis 60+'	Report

Umpires:
Sofia Aleman (URU)
Claudia Montino (CHI)

== First to fourth place classification ==
=== Bracket ===
Semi-finals
10 July
Argentina	5
Uruguay	0
10 July
United States (p.s.o.)	1 (4)
Chile	1 (3)

Final
12 July
Argentina	3
United States	1
Third place
12 July
Uruguay	0
Chile	1

=== Semi-finals ===
10 July 2024
15:45

Argentina	5–0	Uruguay
Ferola 3'; Arias 6'; P. Pisthón 10'; Stamati 11', 19'	Report

Umpires:
Allison Mikelson (USA)
Nora Struchtrup (CAN)

10 July 2024
18:00

United States	1–1	Chile
Croon 60'	Report	Arrieta 14'
Penalties
Heck (penalty shoot-out missed); Rose (penalty shoot-out scored); Adams (penalty shoot-out scored); Bianco (penalty shoot-out scored); Mendez-Trendler (penalty shoot-out missed); Rose (penalty shoot-out scored)	4–3	(penalty shoot-out scored) Gutiérrez; (penalty shoot-out missed) Gago; (penalty shoot-out scored) Messen; (penalty shoot-out missed) Barrios; (penalty shoot-out scored) Obon; (penalty shoot-out missed) Gutiérrez

Umpires:
Victoria Pazos (PAR)
Ana Vazquez Escalante (MEX)

=== Third and fourth place ===
12 July 2024
12:30

Uruguay	0–1	Chile
	Report	Irazoqui 43'

Umpires:
Allison Mikelson (USA)
Ana Vazquez Escalante (MEX)

=== Final ===
12 July 2024
17:00

Argentina	3–1	United States
L. Pisthón 8'; Falasco 9'; Arias 48'	Report	Mendez-Trendler 21'

Umpires:
Victoria Pazos (PAR)
Claudia Montino (CHI)

== Statistics ==
=== Final standings ===
Pos	Team	Qualification
1st place, gold medalist(s)	Argentina	2025 Junior World Cup and 2025 Junior Pan American Games
2nd place, silver medalist(s)	United States	2025 Junior World Cup and 2025 Junior Pan American Games
3rd place, bronze medalist(s)	Chile (Note: Chile is already qualified for the 2025 Junior World Cup as host.)	2025 Junior Pan American Games
4	Uruguay	2025 Junior World Cup and 2025 Junior Pan American Games
5	Canada (H)	2025 Junior World Cup and 2025 Junior Pan American Games
6	Mexico	

Source: FIH
(H) Host

=== Goalscorers ===
There were 106 goals scored in 20 matches, for an average of 5.3 goals per match.

7 goals

- (Argentina) Catalina Stamati

6 goals

- (Argentina) Pilar Pisthón

5 goals

- (Argentina) Valentina Ferola

4 goals

- (United States) Olivia Bent-Cole
- (United States) Daniela Mendez-Trendler

3 goals

- (Argentina) Sol Guignet
- (Argentina) Emma Knobl
- (Argentina) Lourdes Pisthón
- (Canada) Kenzie Girgis
- (United States) Jans Croon
- (Uruguay) Elisa Civetta
- (Uruguay) Carolina Curcio
- (Uruguay) Pilar Lemoine

2 goals

- (Argentina) Ariana Arias
- (Argentina) Victoria Falasco
- (Argentina) Sol Olalla
- (Argentina) Brisa Ruggeri
- (Canada) Grace Leahy
- (Chile) Victoria Arrieta
- (Chile) Josefina Gutiérrez
- (Chile) Francisca Irazoqui
- (Chile) Isabel Oyaban
- (Chile) Jacinta Solari
- (United States) Lucy Adams
- (United States) Maci Bradford
- (United States) Hope Rose
- (Uruguay) Agustina Díaz

1 goal

- (Argentina) Agustina Miranda
- (Argentina) Malena Sabez
- (Canada) Stella Goddard-Despot
- (Canada) Stella Malinowski
- (Canada) Brooke McCusker
- (Canada) Nicole Poulakis
- (Canada) Mikayla Stelling
- (Canada) Shannon Stelling
- (Chile) Martina Gago
- (Chile) María Goñi
- (Chile) Monserrat Obon
- (Chile) Ignacia Orellana
- (Chile) Laura Salamanca
- (Mexico) Valeria Espinoza
- (Mexico) Itzel García
- (Mexico) Cristina Ortíz
- (United States) Mia Abello
- (United States) Ella Gaitan
- (United States) Ryleigh Heck
- (United States) Ava Moore
- (United States) Mia Myklebust
- (United States) Mia Schoenbeck
- (Uruguay) Justina Arregui
- (Uruguay) Chiara Curcio
- (Uruguay) Lupe Curutchague
- (Uruguay) Josefina Mari
- (Uruguay) Paula Pérez
- (Uruguay) María Rodríguez

Source: FIH
