= Jessie Anderson (field hockey) =

New Zealand field hockey player (born 1998)

Personal information
- Full name: Jessica Anderson
- Born: 29 September 1998 (age 27) Christchurch, New Zealand

Sport
- Sport: Field hockey
- Position: Forward
- Club: Canterbury
National team
Years	Team	Caps	Goals
2016–	New Zealand	14	(2)
2018–19	New Zealand U–21	7	(0)
Medal record
Women's field hockey
Representing New Zealand
Oceania Cup
Gold medal – first place	2025 Darwin

Jessica 'Jessie' Anderson (born 29 September 1998) is a field hockey player from New Zealand.

== Early life ==
Jessie Anderson was born and raised in Christchurch, New Zealand. She is a former student of Villa Maria College.

== Career ==
=== National league ===
In the Ford National Hockey Championship, Anderson plays for Canterbury.

=== Under–21 ===
In 2018, Anderson made her first appearances for the Junior Black Sticks. She competed during a Trans–Tasman Series against Australia in Hastings.

Anderson again represented the national under–21 team in 2019, appearing at a Tri–Nations Tournament in Canberra.

=== Black Sticks ===
Anderson made her international debut for the Black Sticks in 2016. She made two appearances in a test series against Malaysia in Stratford.

Following an eight-year absence from the national team, Anderson received a call-up to the squad in 2024. She was a member of the squad during a test series against Japan in Auckland. She was also a member of the squad that competed at the 2023–24 FIH Nations Cup in Terrassa.

==== International goals ====
Goal	Date	Location	Opponent	Score	Result	Competition	Ref.
1	3 June 2024	Estadi Martí Colomer, Terrassa, Spain	Chile	1–0	1–0	2023–24 FIH Nations Cup	
2	7 September 2025	MWT Hockey Centre, Darwin, Australia	Australia	1–1	1–1	2025 Oceania Cup	
