= Brooke Roberts (field hockey) =

New Zealand field hockey player

Personal information
- Born: 16 February 1995 (age 31) Whangārei, New Zealand
- Height: 168 cm (5 ft 6 in)

Sport
- Sport: Field hockey
- Position: Goalkeeper
Senior career
Years	Team	Caps	Goals
–	North Harbour	-	-
National team
Years	Team	Caps	Goals
2015–2016	New Zealand U–21	11	(0)
2016–	New Zealand	47	(0)
Medal record
Women's field hockey
Representing New Zealand
Oceania Cup
Silver medal – second place	2023 Whangārei
FIH Nations Cup
Gold medal – first place	2024–25 Santiago

Brooke Roberts (born 16 February 1995) is a New Zealand field hockey player.

== Personal life ==
Brooke Roberts was born in Whangārei, New Zealand.

== Career ==
=== Under–21 ===
Roberts made her international debut for New Zealand at Under–21 level. She represented the junior squad at a 2015 Six–Nations Tournament in Breda.

The following year she represented the team again, competing at the Junior Oceania Cup in the Gold Coast, as well as the FIH Junior World Cup in Santiago.

=== Black Sticks ===
Following her successful junior career, Roberts made her senior international debut in 2016. She made her first appearance for the Black Sticks during a test series against Malaysia in Auckland.

Since her debut she has been a mainstay in the national squad. She made her first appearance at a major tournament during the 2022 FIH World Cup in Amsterdam and Terrassa. She has since won a silver medal at the 2023 Oceania Cup held in her home town, Whangārei.

She has been named in the squad for the 2024 FIH Olympic Qualifiers in Ranchi.
