= Argentina women's national under-21 field hockey team =

Argentina U21: Field Hockey

Argentina
- Association: Argentine Hockey Confederation (Confederación Argentina de Hockey)
- Confederation: PAHF (Americas)
- Head Coach: Juan Martín López
Home	Away

FIH Junior World Cup
- Appearances: 11 (first in 1989)
- Best result: (gold) 1st (1993, 2016)

Pan American Junior Championship
- Appearances: 12 (first in 1988)
- Best result: (gold) 1st (1988, 1992, 1997, 2000, 2005, 2012, 2016, 2024, 2026)
Medal record
FIH Junior World Cup
Gold medal – first place	1993 Terrassa
Gold medal – first place	2016 Santiago
Silver medal – second place	2001 Buenos Aires
Silver medal – second place	2009 Boston
Silver medal – second place	2013 Mönchengladbach
Silver medal – second place	2023 Santiago
Silver medal – second place	2025 Santiago
Bronze medal – third place	1997 Seongnam
Pan American Junior Championship
Gold medal – first place	1988 Buenos Aires
Gold medal – first place	1992 Caracas
Gold medal – first place	1997 Santiago
Gold medal – first place	2000 Bridgetown
Gold medal – first place	2005 San Juan
Gold medal – first place	2012 Guadalajara
Gold medal – first place	2016 Tacarigua
Gold medal – first place	2024 Surrey
Gold medal – first place	2026 Santiago
Silver medal – second place	2023 St. Michael
Bronze medal – third place	2008 Mexico City

The Argentina women's national under-21 field hockey team represents Argentina in women's international under-21 field hockey competitions and is controlled by the Argentine Hockey Confederation, the governing body for field hockey in Argentina.

The team competes in the Pan American Junior Championship which they have won a record nine times. They have qualified for all Junior World Cups which they have won twice.

== Tournament record ==
Junior World Cup
Year	Host city	Position
1989	Ottawa, Canada	6th
1993	Terrassa, Spain	1st
1997	Seongnam, South Korea	3rd
2001	Buenos Aires, Argentina	2nd
2005	Santiago, Chile	5th
2009	Boston, United States	2nd
2013	Mönchengladbach, Germany	2nd
2016	Santiago, Chile	1st
2022	Potchefstroom, South Africa	5th
2023	Santiago, Chile	2nd
2025	Santiago, Chile	2nd
2027	TBD	Qualified

Pan American Junior Championship
Year	Host city	Position
1988	Buenos Aires, Argentina	1st
1992	Caracas, Venezuela	1st
1997	Santiago, Chile	1st
2000	Bridgetown, Barbados	1st
2005	San Juan, Puerto Rico	1st
2008	Mexico City, Mexico	3rd
2012	Guadalajara, Mexico	1st
2016	Tacarigua, Trinidad and Tobago	1st
2021	Santiago, Chile	5th
2023	St. Michael, Barbados	2nd
2024	Surrey, Canada	1st
2026	Santiago, Chile	1st

Junior Pan American Games
Year	Host city	Position
2025	Asunción, Paraguay	1st
2029	Rosario, Argentina	TBD

== Current squad ==
These players have been announced on 20 March 2026 to compete in the 2026 Junior PanAm Championship from April 6th to 18th in Santiago, Chile.

Head Coach: Juan Martín López

No.	Pos.	Player	Date of birth (age)	Caps	Club
13	GK	Delfina Lazcano	23 August 2008 (age 18)	0	(Argentina) San Lorenzo
32	GK	Mercedes Artola	16 January 2006 (age 20)	26	(Argentina) River Plate
3	DF	Chiara Ambrosini	2 November 2006 (age 20)	5	(Argentina) Ferro
25	DF	Rocío Bianchi	2 September 2006 (age 20)	0	(Argentina) Universitario de Rosario
27	DF	Trinidad Holmgren	20 April 2005 (age 21)	0	(Argentina) CASI
33	DF	Luján Saez	14 October 2005 (age 21)	0	(Argentina) Los Tordos Rugby Club
37	DF	Máxima Duportal	8 June 2005 (age 21)	8	(Argentina) River Plate
4	MF	Sol di Fonzo	3 July 2006 (age 20)	0	(Argentina) San Fernando
8	MF	Milagros di Santo	3 October 2006 (age 20)	16	(Argentina) Lomas
12	MF	Bárbara Raposo	9 May 2007 (age 19)	11	(Argentina) Popeye Béisbol Club
15	MF	Sol Olalla	16 January 2005 (age 21)	18	(Argentina) Italiano
20	MF	Delfina Mussari	23 May 2007 (age 19)	4	(Argentina) Lomas
30	MF	Delfina Persoglia	4 April 2005 (age 21)	10	(Argentina) Universitario de Rosario
39	MF	Martina Santamarina	17 November 2006 (age 19)	0	(Argentina) Tucumán Rugby Club
7	FW	Clarisa Iudicello	7 February 2008 (age 18)	0	(Argentina) Córdoba Athletic
11	FW	Lourdes Pisthón	27 December 2007 (age 18)	18	(Argentina) Banco Nación
14	FW	Pilar Robles	16 March 2005 (age 21)	0	(Argentina) Mar del Plata Club
22	FW	Morena Sala	26 October 2007 (age 19)	0	(Argentina) River Plate
31	FW	Luciana Peralta	19 July 2008 (age 18)	0	(Argentina) Los Tordos Rugby Club
35	FW	Manuela Raimondo	28 July 2006 (age 20)	0	(Argentina) GEBA

== Records in competitions ==
There are no records of the squads for the Junior World Cup since its first edition until 2005 edition. Argentina participated in all the editions of the competition.

Records until 2020

Jersey #	Competitions									
Jersey #	2005		2008	2009	2010		2012	2013	2016	
Jersey #	PAJC	JWC	PAJC	JWC	PAYC	YOG	PAJC	JWC	PAJC	JWC
1	Succi		Saenz	Saravia	Brondello		Monserrat			Cosentino
2	Dominguez		Merino		Cabut		Gomes Fantasia		Toccalino	
3	Pereyra		Román		Emme		Metidieri		Gorzelany	
4	Rivosecchi	Barrionuevo	Blanco	Wohlfeiler	Broccoli		Pescador	Sanguinetti	Trinchinetti	
5	Cerutti		Sánchez Moccia		Castiglioni		Cedrés		Alonso	
6	Méjico		Wohlfeiler		Leiva	de Iure	Cabut		Donati	
7	Diez		Kakazu	Bertarini	Albertario				F. Ladra Mi.	
8	Silva		Zuloaga	Cavallero	Bianchi		Habif F.		Dichiara	
9	Bouza		Rojas Y.	Dupuy	Garraffo		Romang		Jardel	
10	Pallitto		Fideleff	Román	Cedrés		Habif A.		F. Ladra Ma.	
11	Rebecchi		Rojas M.	Lozzia	Fernández S.		Werthein			
12	D'Elía		Bertarini	Saenz	Baldoni			Brondello	F. Gutiérrez	
13	Aguirre		Villalba		Habif F.		Zapulla	Ravetta	Rossetti	
14	García		del Frari		Bustos		Correa		F. Lacort	
15	Garmendia	Kañevsky	Sruoga J.	Rojas M.	Gómez	Álvarez	Juárez	F. Ladra Ma.	Granatto	
16	Maloberti	Garmendia	Arias	Soracco	Mama		Villarroya		Sanguinetti	
17	Luchetti		Campoy		de Iure		Acosta	Granatto	Borgia	
18	Anton	Mutio	Sruoga D.		Álvarez			Molina		
20				Zuloaga			Bustos		von der Heyde	
21				Fernández M.			Martínez			
22				Calvete						
24				González Canda						
26									Ortiz	
28									Jankunas	
30				Sruoga J.						
HC	Ernesto Morlan		Guillermo Fonseca	Carlos Retegui	Santiago Capurro				Agustín Corradini	
Position	1st place, gold medalist(s)	5th	3rd place, bronze medalist(s)	2nd place, silver medalist(s)	1st place, gold medalist(s)	2nd place, silver medalist(s)	1st place, gold medalist(s)	2nd place, silver medalist(s)	1st place, gold medalist(s)	

=== 2020's records ===
Jersey #	Competitions							
Jersey #	2021	2022	2023		2024	2025		2026
Jersey #	PAJC	JWC	PAJC	JWC	PAJC	JPAG	JWC	PAJC
1	Moretti	Pérez Iturraspe	Pallottini		Ladrón		Ladrón	
2	Alias		Castellaro			Castellaro		
3	Ponce	Pineda	Ferola				Ambrosini	
4	Goldstein	Cairo	Raposo V.					di Fonzo
5	del Carril	di Santo C.			Falasco			
6	Lorenzini	Miranda V.	Ruggeri			Lardies		
7	Nardi	Guggini			Arias			Iudicello
8		Cerundolo	Cairo		di Santo M.			
9	Correa Llano	Bruggesser	Casas					
10	Ramallo		Bruggesser			Casas		
11	Bazzana E.	Adorno	Iacoponi	Palacio		Pisthon L.		
12		Dodorico	Arias			Raposo B.		Raposo B.
13								Lazcano
14		Pacheco			Bazzana B.			Robles
15	Cerviño				Ollala			
16	Nobile	Pagella			Miranda A.			
17	Belizón	Santamarina P.			Pisthon L.			
18	Milazzotto	Andrade			Stamati			
19			Rosenbrock			Guignet		
20	Gabutti	Raposo V.	Caucigh	Falasco		Mussari		Mussari
21	Guignet	Raposo C.						
22	Giacchino			Díaz			Pucheta	Sala
23		Larsen		Pisthon P.				
24		Manuele	Altamirano		Raposo B.			
25		Castellaro		Sabez				Bianchi
26	Benedetti							
27		Concetti			Guignet			Holmgren
29					Knobl		Knobl	
30						Persoglia		
31								Peralta
32			Artola					
33							Díaz	Saez
35								Raimondo
37						Duportal		
39								Santamarina M.
64						Alastra		
HC	Rolando Rivero	Fernando Ferrara	Juan Martín López					
Position	5th		2nd place, silver medalist(s)		1st place, gold medalist(s)		2nd place, silver medalist(s)	1st place, gold medalist(s)

U-21 player (eligible)

== Youth team ==
=== Tournament records ===
Youth Olympic Games
Year	Host city	Position
2010	Singapore	2nd
2014	Nanjing, China	3rd
2018	Buenos Aires, Argentina	1st
2026	Dakar, Senegal	TBD

South American Youth Games
Year	Host city	Position
2022	Rosario, Argentina	1st

Pan American Youth Championship
Year	Host city	Position
2010	Montevideo, Uruguay	1st
2014	Montevideo, Uruguay	1st
2018	Guadalajara, Mexico	1st

=== Youth squad ===
The following players were listed on the roster for the 2022 events:

Head Coach: Juan Martín López.

No.	Pos.	Player	Date of birth (age)	Caps	Club
1	GK	Catalina Bustillo	24 September 2005 (age 21) – (Buenos Aires Province) Pinamar	5	(Argentina) CET
2		Juana Castellaro (Captain)	29 March 2005 (age 21) – Buenos Aires	5	(Argentina) River
3		Ambar Caucigh	11 February 2004 (age 22) – (Chubut Province) Trelew	5	(Argentina) Ciudad
4		Victoria Falasco	1 April 2004 (age 22) – (Buenos Aires Province) Flores	5	(Argentina) GEBA
5		Lourdes Estigarria	20 January 2004 (age 22) – (La Pampa Province) General Pico	5	(Argentina) Sportivo Independiente
6		Carolina Lardies	9 January 2004 (age 22) – Buenos Aires	5	(Argentina) San Fernando
7		Pilar Robles	16 March 2005 (age 21) – (Buenos Aires Province) Mar del Plata	5	(Argentina) Universitario de Mar del Plata
8		Renata Leszczynski	10 November 2004 (age 21) - Buenos Aires	5	(Argentina) San Martín
9		Valentina Rebesberger	1 December 2004 (age 21) – Buenos Aires	5	(Argentina) Liceo Naval

=== Results ===
2018

==== Youth Pan American Championship ====
12 March 2018 Round-Robin	Argentina	12 – 0	Guatemala	Guadalajara, Mexico
	Miranda 3', 5'; Di Santo 7', 9', 16', 20'; Cerundolo 15', 18'; Palet 17', 20'; Ramallo 18', 19'

12 March 2018 Round-Robin	Argentina	15 – 0	Jamaica	Guadalajara, Mexico
	Cerundolo 2'; Bruggeser 3', 20'; Palet 4', 14'; Di Santo 6', 10', 13', 15', 18'; Ramallo 6', 12'; Arcidiacono 7'; Miranda 9', 19'

13 March 2018 Round-Robin	Argentina	6 – 1	Mexico	Guadalajara, Mexico
	Bruggeser 5'; Cerundolo 7'; Palet 7'; Ramallo 9', 19'; Arcidiacono 15'		Ramírez 19'

13 March 2018 Round-Robin	Argentina	8 – 0	Uruguay	Guadalajara, Mexico
	Cerundolo 2', 12'; Bruggeser 8', 16'; Palet 9', 19'; Di Santo 10', 18'

14 March 2018 Round-Robin	Argentina	9 – 0	Paraguay	Guadalajara, Mexico
	Palet 2', 7', 17'; Bruggeser 4', 18'; Di Santo 6'; Ramallo 9'; Miranda 15'; Cerundolo 19'

17 March 2018 Final	Argentina	4 – 0	Uruguay	Guadalajara, Mexico
	Arcidiacono 6'; Di Santo 9'; Miranda 16'; Cerundolo 18'

==== Youth Olympic Games ====
7 October 2018 Group Stage	Argentina	21 – 0	Vanuatu	Buenos Aires, Argentina
	Cerundolo 1', 10', 14', 16'; Miranda 2', 3'; Rubenacker 6', 9', 18', 20'; Ramallo 7' di Santo 9', 10', 20'; Bruggesser 11', 12', 15', 19'; Palet 11', 18', 20'	Report

8 October 2018 Group Stage	Argentina	6 – 0	Austria	Buenos Aires, Argentina
	Bruggesser 5', 14' di Santo 7', 16'; Rubenacker 11'; Ramallo 18'	Report

9 October 2018 Group Stage	Argentina	4 – 0	South Africa	Buenos Aires, Argentina
	Cerundolo 3'; Bruggesser 4'; Palet 5', 12'	Report

10 October 2018 Group Stage	Argentina	5 – 2	India	Buenos Aires, Argentina
	di Santo 7'; Ramallo 10', 12'; Bruggesser 17'; Palet 19'	Report	Khan 8'; Reet 10'

11 October 2018 Group Stage	Argentina	5 – 0	Uruguay	Buenos Aires, Argentina
	Bruggesser 4'; Ramallo 5', 9'; Rubenacker 7'; Palet 9'	Report

12 October 2018 Quarterfinal	Argentina	3 – 0	Namibia	Buenos Aires, Argentina
	Rubenacker 2'; Bruggesser 8', 20'	Report

13 October 2018 Semifinal	Argentina	11 – 0	South Africa	Buenos Aires, Argentina
	Cerundolo 7', 20' di Santo 9', 18'; Rubenacker 10', 10', 19'; Palet 13', 15'; Bruggesser 14', 17'	Report

14 October 2018 Final	Argentina	3 – 1	India	Buenos Aires, Argentina
	Palet 7'; Ramallo 10'; Bruggesser 12'	Report	Khan 1'

=== Hockey 5 competitions ===
Jersey #	Competitions				
Jersey #	2014 PAYC	2014 YOG	2018 PAYC	2018 YOG	2022 YSAG
1	Cosentino			Pérez Iturraspe	Bustillo
2	Dichiara		Arcidiácono	Rübenacker	Castellaro
3	Jardel		Bruggesser		Caucigh
4	Toccalino		Cerundolo		Falasco
5	Trinchinetti		di Santo		Estigarria
6	Caruso	Losada	Miranda		Lardies
7	Retegui		Palet		Robles
8	Triñanes	Thome	Ramallo		Leszczynski
9	Jankunas				Rebesberger
10	Ortiz				
11			Sibilia		
12			Piñeiro	Iritxity Irigoyen	
HC	Agustín Corradini		Juan Pacheco	Carlos Retegui	Juan Martín López
Position	1st place, gold medalist(s)	3rd place, bronze medalist(s)	1st place, gold medalist(s)		

== See also ==
- Argentina men's national under-21 field hockey team
- Argentina women's national field hockey team
