= 1988 Women's Pan American Junior Championship =

Field hockey tournament

The 1988 Women's Pan American Junior Championship was the first edition of the Women's Pan American Junior Championship. It was held between 10 and 17 August 1988 in Buenos Aires, Argentina.

== Results ==
=== Final ===
1988

Argentina	3–0	United States

== Final standings ==
Rank	Team
1st place, gold medalist(s)	Argentina
2nd place, silver medalist(s)	United States
3rd place, bronze medalist(s)	Chile
4	Uruguay
5	Cuba
6	Paraguay
