= Kim Min-jeong (field hockey) =

South Korean field hockey player (born 1997)

Personal information
- Born: 18 November 1997 (age 28) South Korea

Sport
- Sport: Field hockey
- Position: Defence
- Club: Mokpo City Hall
National team
Years	Team	Caps	Goals
2018–	South Korea	27	(0)
Medal record
Women's field hockey
Representing South Korea
Asian Games
Silver medal – second place	2022 Hangzhou	Team
Asian Cup
Silver medal – second place	2022 Muscat	Team
Asian Champions Trophy
Silver medal – second place	2021 Donghae	Team

Kim Min-jeong (김민정, born 18 November 1997) is a field hockey player from South Korea.

== Career ==
=== Senior national team ===
Kim made her senior international debut in 2018 at the SOMPO Cup in Osaka.

Since her debut Kim has won numerous medals with the national team. She has won silver medals at the 2021 Asian Champions Trophy in Donghae City, the 2022 Asian Cup in Muscat and at the 2022 Asian Games in Hangzhou.

She has been named in the squad for the 2024 FIH Olympic Qualifiers in Valencia.
