= United States women's national under-21 field hockey team =

National U21 Hockey Team, United States

United States
- Association: USA Field Hockey
- Confederation: PAHF (Americas)
- Head Coach: Tracey Paul
- Assistant coach(es): Allan Law
- Manager: Georgia Holland
- Captain: Alia Marshall

Junior World Cup
- Appearances: 10 (first in 1989)
- Best result: 6th (2025)

The United States women's national under-21 field hockey team represents the United States in international under-21 field hockey competitions. The team is controlled by the governing body for field hockey in the United States, USA Field Hockey, which is a member of the Pan American Hockey Federation (PAHF) and the International Hockey Federation (FIH).

The team's first recorded appearance was at the 1988 Pan American Junior Championship, where the team finished in second place.

The team's last appearance was in 2026, during the Pan American Junior Championship in Santiago.

== History ==
=== Tournament Records ===
FIH Junior World Cup
Year	Location	Position	Pld	W	D	L	GF	GA	GD	Pts
1989	Ottawa, Canada	10th	7	1	0	6	5	22	–17	3
1993	Terrassa, Spain	did not participate								
1997	Seongnam, South Korea	12th	7	0	0	7	4	58	–54	0
2001	Buenos Aires, Argentina	14th	7	1	0	6	6	18	–12	3
2005	Santiago, Chile	7th	8	4	2	2	31	14	+17	14
2009	Boston, United States	8th	7	3	0	4	17	18	–1	9
2013	Mönchengladbach, Germany	7th	6	3	0	3	16	14	+2	9
2016	Santiago, Chile	8th	6	2	0	4	16	14	+2	6
2021	Potchefstroom, South Africa	8th	6	2	0	4	12	16	–4	6
2023	Santiago, Chile	10th	6	4	1	1	25	11	+14	13
2025	Santiago, Chile	6th	6	4	0	2	16	11	+5	12
2027	TBD	Qualified								

Pan American Junior Championship
Year	Location	Position	Pld	W	D	L	GF	GA	GD	Pts
1988	Buenos Aires, Argentina	2nd	–	–	–	–	–	–	–	–
1992	Caracas, Venezuela	4th	–	–	–	–	–	–	–	–
1997	Santiago, Chile	3rd	6	4	0	2	40	6	+34	12
2000	Bridgetown, Barbados	2nd	5	4	0	1	21	8	+13	12
2005	San Juan, Puerto Rico	2nd	7	6	0	1	31	4	+27	18
2008	Mexico City, Mexico	1st	5	4	1	0	37	4	+33	13
2012	Guadalajara, Mexico	3rd	7	5	0	2	37	10	+27	15
2016	Tacarigua, Trinidad and Tobago	2nd	6	5	0	1	40	7	+33	15
2021	Santiago, Chile	3rd	4	2	1	1	18	3	+15	7
2023	St. Michael, Barbados	1st	4	1	2	1	6	5	+1	5
2024	Surrey, Canada	2nd	7	5	1	1	23	12	+11	16
2026	Santiago, Chile	2nd	7	3	1	3	26	11	+15	10

Junior Pan American Games
Year	Location	Position	Pld	W	D	L	GF	GA	GD	Pts
2025	Asunción, Paraguay	2nd	5	4	0	1	25	4	+21	12

== Team ==
=== Current squad ===
The following 18 players represented the U.S. at the 2021 Pan American Junior Championship in Santiago.

Caps and goals updated as of August 28, 2021 after the match against the United States.

No.	Pos.	Player	Date of birth (age)	Caps	Goals	Club
21	GK	Gianna Glatz	July 11, 1999 (age 27)	4	0	(United States) Rutgers University
30	GK	Annabel Skubisz	January 29, 2002 (age 24)	4	0	(United States) Texas Pride
3	DF	Kathryn Peterson	May 7, 2000 (age 26)	4	0	(United States) RUSH
5	DF	Emma DeBerdine	May 7, 2000 (age 26)	4	0	(United States) Maryland Terrapins
8	DF	Sofía Southam	February 20, 2000 (age 26)	4	3	
12	DF	Lauren Wadas	April 9, 2002 (age 24)	4	1	(United States) WC Eagles
15	DF	Skyler Caron	January 4, 2000 (age 26)	4	1	(United States) Boston College
2	MF	Ashley Sessa	June 23, 2004 (age 22)	4	3	(United States) WC Eagles
7	MF	Lindsay Dickinson	June 28, 2000 (age 26)	4	0	(United States) University of Connecticut
11	MF	Kayla Blas	November 4, 2000 (age 25)	4	0	(United States) Northwestern University
14	MF	Gracyn Banks	February 11, 2000 (age 26)	4	0	(United States) University of Pennsylvania
17	MF	Alia Marshall (C)	October 5, 2000 (age 26)	4	0	(United States) Oranje-Gotta Love it!
4	FW	Charlotte de Vries	November 17, 2000 (age 25)	4	5	(United States) WC Eagles
6	FW	Hope Rose	February 28, 2003 (age 23)	4	3	(United States) WC Eagles
9	FW	Madeleine Zimmer	September 28, 2001 (age 25)	6	2	(United States) Alley Cats
10	FW	Leah Crouse	February 22, 2000 (age 26)	4	0	(United States) TCOYO
13	FW	Abigail Tamer	July 9, 2003 (age 23)	4	1	(United States) University of Michigan
16	FW	Riley Donnelly	March 29, 2000 (age 26)	4	0	(United States) University of Maryland
