= Canada women's national under-21 field hockey team =

National U21 Hockey Team, Canada

Canada
- Nickname(s): Wolf Pups
- Association: Field Hockey Canada
- Confederation: PAHF (Pan America)
- Head Coach: Jenn Beagan
- Assistant coach(es): Cassius Mendonca
- Manager: Nancy Charlton
- Captain: Melanie Scholz

Junior World Cup
- Appearances: 9 (first in 1989)
- Best result: 7th (1989)

The Canada women's national under-21 field hockey team represents Canada in international under-21 field hockey competitions. The team is controlled by the governing body for field hockey in Canada, Field Hockey Canada, which is a member of the Pan American Hockey Federation (PAHF) and the International Hockey Federation (FIH).

The team's first recorded appearance was at the 1989 FIH World Cup, where the team finished in seventh place.

The team claimed an historic gold medal in 2021 at the Pan American Junior Championship in Santiago.

== Tournament records ==
FIH Junior World Cup
Year	Location	Position	Pld	W	D	L	GF	GA	GD
1989	Ottawa, Canada	7th	7	3	0	4	7	13	−6
1993	Terrassa, Spain	8th	7	2	0	5	4	16	−12
1997	Seongnam, South Korea	11th	7	1	0	6	5	28	−23
2001	Buenos Aires, Argentina	13th	7	3	0	4	10	21	−11
2005	Santiago, Chile	15th	7	2	1	4	16	15	+1
2009	Boston, United States	Did not participate							
2013	Mönchengladbach, Germany	14th	6	1	1	4	11	16	−5
2016	Santiago, Chile	Did not participate							
2021	Potchefstroom, South Africa	15th	4	0	0	4	2	21	−19
2023	Santiago, Chile	16th	6	0	1	5	4	42	−38
2025	Santiago, Chile	20th	6	0	2	4	5	23	−18
2027	TBD	Qualified							

Pan American Junior Championship
Year	Location	Position	Pld	W	D	L	GF	GA	GD
1988	Buenos Aires, Argentina	Did not participate							
1992	Caracas, Venezuela	3rd	–	–	–	–	–	–	–
1997	Santiago, Chile	2nd	6	5	0	1	25	8	+17
2000	Bridgetown, Barbados	3rd	5	2	1	2	13	13	0
2005	San Juan, Puerto Rico	4th	7	4	0	3	30	7	+23
2008	Mexico City, Mexico	Did not participate							
2012	Guadalajara, Mexico	2nd	6	3	1	2	18	11	+7
2016	Tacarigua, Trinidad and Tobago	4th	6	2	1	3	9	17	−8
2021	Santiago, Chile	1st	4	3	1	0	3	0	+3
2023	St. Michael, Barbados								
2024	Surrey, Canada	5th	6	2	0	4	11	22	–11
2026	Santiago, Chile	5th	6	2	1	3	7	17	–10

== Current squad ==
The following 18 players represented Canada at the 2021 Pan American Junior Championship in Santiago.

Caps and goals updated as of August 28, 2021, after the match against Uruguay.

No.	Pos.	Player	Date of birth (age)	Caps	Goals	Club
2	GK	Ishaval Sekhon	4 January 2002 (age 24)	1	0	(Canada) University of British Columbia
33	GK	Lucy Wheeler	20 December 1999 (age 26)	3	0	(Canada) Capilano University
3	DF	Stefanie Sajko	16 November 2000 (age 25)	4	0	(Canada) University of Victoria
5	DF	Katie Lynes	23 July 1999 (age 27)	4	0	(Canada) University of Toronto
12	DF	Sara Goodman (C)	22 October 1999 (age 27)	14	2	(Canada) University of British Columbia
19	DF	Jenna Berger	30 November 2000 (age 25)	4	0	(United States) University of Massachusetts
4	MF	Madison Workman	4 August 2000 (age 26)	4	0	(United States) Miami University
6	MF	Anna Mollenhauer	18 September 1999 (age 27)	4	1	(Canada) University of Victoria
8	MF	Rebecca Carvalho	20 January 2000 (age 26)	4	0	(Canada) University of Toronto
13	MF	Bronwyn Bird	30 April 2002 (age 24)	4	0	(United States) Dartmouth College
16	MF	Melanie Scholz	15 July 2000 (age 26)	4	0	(Canada) University of Calgary
21	MF	Nora Goddard	10 January 2001 (age 25)	8	0	(United States) Providence College
11	FW	Nora Struchtrup	21 August 2002 (age 24)	4	0	(Canada) University of Victoria
7	FW	Jordyn Faiczak	2 April 1999 (age 27)	14	0	(Canada) University of British Columbia
10	FW	Thora Rae	15 October 1999 (age 27)	8	1	(Canada) University of British Columbia
14	FW	Samantha McCrory	30 April 2000 (age 26)	4	0	(Canada) University of Victoria
17	FW	Danielle Husar	16 May 2001 (age 25)	8	0	(United States) Virginia Cavaliers
20	FW	Julia Ross	27 July 2001 (age 25)	4	0	(United States) University of Maine
