= Women's Junior Pan American Cup =

International field hockey tournament

Women's Pan American Junior Championship
- Current season, competition or edition: 2026 Women's Junior Pan American Championship
- Sport: Field hockey
- Founded: 1988; 38 years ago
- First season: 1988
- No. of teams: 7
- Confederation: PAHF (Americas)
- Most recent champion: Argentina (9th title) (2026)
- Most titles: Argentina (9 titles)

The Women's Pan American Junior Championship is a women's international under-21 field hockey tournament organized by the Pan American Hockey Federation. The tournament has been held since 1988 and serves as a qualification tournament for the Junior World Cup.

The tournament has been won by three different teams: Argentina has the most titles with seven, the United States and Canada both have won one title. The most recent edition was held in Santiago, Chile and was won by Canada.

== Results ==
Year	Host	Final			Third place match			Number of teams
Year	Host	Winner	Score	Runner-up	Third place	Score	Fourth place	Number of teams
1988; Details	Buenos Aires, Argentina	Argentina		United States	Chile		Uruguay	6
1992; Details	Caracas, Venezuela	Argentina		Trinidad and Tobago	Canada		United States	4
1997; Details	Santiago, Chile	Argentina	7–1	Canada	United States	3–0	Chile	10
2000; Details	Bridgetown, Barbados	Argentina	5–0	United States	Canada	0–0 (a.e.t.) (3–2 p.s.)	Chile	9
2005; Details	San Juan, Puerto Rico	Argentina	3–1	United States	Chile	2–1	Canada	12
2008; Details	Mexico City, Mexico	United States	2–1 (a.e.t.)	Chile	Argentina	8–0	Mexico	8
2012; Details	Guadalajara, Mexico	Argentina	2–1	Canada	United States	2–1	Chile	11
2016; Details	Tacarigua, Trinidad and Tobago	Argentina	6–0	United States	Chile	3–0	Canada	8
2021; Details	Santiago, Chile	Canada	1–0	Uruguay	United States	1–1 (3–2 s.o.)	Chile	6
2023; Details	Bridgetown, Barbados	United States	1–1 (4–1 s.o.)	Argentina	Chile	5–1	Canada	7
2024; Details	Surrey, Canada	Argentina	3–1	United States	Chile	1–0	Uruguay	6
2026; Details	Santiago, Chile	Argentina	3–1	United States	Uruguay	1–0	Chile	6

=== Summary ===
Team	Winners	Runners-up	Third place	Fourth place
Argentina	9 (1988*, 1992, 1997, 2000, 2005, 2012, 2016, 2024, 2026)	1 (2023)	1 (2008)	
United States	2 (2008, 2023)	6 (1988, 2000, 2005, 2016, 2024, 2026)	3 (1997, 2012, 2021)	1 (1992)
Canada	1 (2021)	2 (1997, 2012)	2 (1992, 2000)	3 (2005, 2016, 2023)
Chile		1 (2008)	5 (1988, 2005, 2016, 2023, 2024)	5 (1997*, 2000, 2012, 2021*, 2026*)
Uruguay		1 (2021)	1 (2026)	2 (1988, 2024)
Trinidad and Tobago		1 (1992)		
Mexico				1 (2008*)

* = host nation

=== Team appearances ===
Team	(Argentina) 1988	(Venezuela) 1992	(Chile) 1997	(Barbados) 2000	(Puerto Rico) 2005	(Mexico) 2008	(Mexico) 2012	(Trinidad and Tobago) 2016	(Chile) 2021	(Barbados) 2023	(Canada) 2024	(Chile) 2026	Total
Argentina	1st	1st	1st	1st	1st	3rd	1st	1st	5th	2nd	1st	1st	12
Barbados	–	–	6th	5th	7th	7th	–	8th	–	7th	–	–	6
Bermuda	–	–	7th	8th	10th	8th	–	–	–	–	–	–	4
Brazil	–	–	–	–	–	–	11th	–	–	–	–	–	2
Canada	–	3rd	2nd	3rd	4th	–	2nd	4th	1st	4th	5th	5th	10
Chile	3rd	–	4th	4th	3rd	2nd	4th	3rd	4th	3rd	3rd	4th	15
Cuba	5th	–	–	–	–	–	–	–	–	–	–	–	1
Dominican Republic	–	–	–	–	12th	–	–	–	–	–	–	–	1
Guyana	–	–	–	–	–	–	–	–	–	6th	–	–	1
Jamaica	–	–	–	–	8th	–	10th	–	–	–	–	–	2
Mexico	–	–	10th	9th	5th	4th	7th	7th	–	–	6th	6th	8
Paraguay	6th	–	8th	–	–	–	9th	–	–	–	–	–	3
Puerto Rico	–	–	–	–	11th	–	–	–	–	–	–	–	1
Trinidad and Tobago	–	2nd	–	6th	9th	6th	8th	6th	6th	–	–	–	7
United States	2nd	4th	3rd	2nd	2nd	1st	3rd	2nd	3rd	1st	2nd	2nd	13
Uruguay	4th	–	5th	–	6th	5th	5th	5th	2nd	5th	4th	3rd	9
Venezuela	–	–	9th	7th	–	–	6th	–	–	–	–	–	3
Total	6	4	10	9	12	8	11	8	6	7	6	6	

== See also ==
- Men's Pan American Junior Championship
- Women's Pan American Cup
