= 2026 Women's EuroHockey U21 Championship =

Tournament details
- Host country: Spain
- City: Valencia
- Dates: 26 July – 1 August
- Teams: 8 (from 1 confederation)

Final positions
- Champions: Netherlands (12th title)
- Runner-up: Spain
- Third place: Germany

Tournament statistics
- Matches played: 20
- Goals scored: 94 (4.7 per match)
- Top scorer: (Netherlands) Imke Verstraeten (6 goals)
- Best player: (Netherlands) Imke Verstraeten
- Best goalkeeper: (Germany) Klara Batschko

The 2026 Women's EuroHockey U21 Championship was the 22nd edition of the Women's EuroHockey U21 Championship, the biennial international women's under-21 field hockey championship of Europe organised by the European Hockey Federation. It was held alongside the women's tournament in Valencia, Spain from 26 July to 1 August 2026. The top 6 teams qualified for the 2027 Junior World Cup. Netherlands retained the title, beating Spain in the final. Germany won the bronze against Belgium.

== Qualification ==
Participating nations qualified based on their final ranking from the 2024 competition.

Dates	Event	Location	Quotas	Qualifier(s)
14–20 July 2024	2024 EuroHockey U21 Championship	Terrassa, Spain	6	Netherlands; Spain; England; Germany; Belgium; Ireland
16–20 July 2024	2024 EuroHockey U21 Championship II	Rakovník, Czech Republic	1	Wales
16–20 July 2024	2024 EuroHockey U21 Championship II	Konya, Turkey	1	Scotland
Total			8	

== Preliminary round ==
=== Pool A ===
Pos	Team	Pld	W	D	L	GF	GA	GD	Pts	Qualification
1	Netherlands	3	3	0	0	16	3	+13	9	Semi-finals
2	Spain (H)	3	1	1	1	6	8	−2	4	Semi-finals
3	England	3	1	1	1	6	9	−3	4	Pool C
4	Scotland	3	0	0	3	1	9	−8	0	Pool C

Source: FIH
Rules for classification: 1) points; 2) matches won; 3) goal difference; 4) goals for; 5) head-to-head result; 6) field goals for.
(H) Hosts

All times are local (UTC+1).

26 July 2026
18:00

Netherlands	6–2	Spain
De Kemp 9'; Van den Heuvel 10', 37', 60'; Wijckmans 34'; Verstraeten 52'	Report	Vilanova 46'; González 54'

Umpires:
Samuel Church (ENG)
Sarah Craig (IRL)

26 July 2026
20:00

England	3–1	Scotland
Mills 21'; Smith 37'; Yonge 58'	Report	Macmillan 47'

Umpires:
Jesus Medinilla (ESP)
Chloe McCall (WAL)

27 July 2026
18:00

England	1–6	Netherlands
Gardens 15'	Report	Sauer 5', 7'; Langedijk 9'; Wijckmans 13'; Van den Heuvel 25'; Walhof 36'

Umpires:
Lukasz Orzeł (POL)
Thalia Bellemans (BEL)

27 July 2026
20:15

Spain	2–0	Scotland
Armenteras 34'; De la Llama 53'	Report

Umpires:
Lucien Vanderborght (BEL)
Una Mihajlović (CRO)

29 July 2026
20:00

Netherlands	4–0	Scotland
Van den Heuvel 40'; Wijckmans 42', 50'; Verstraeten 60'	Report

Umpires:
Chloe McCall (WAL)
Ales Vetrovsky (CZE)

29 July 2026
20:20

Spain	2–2	England
González 29'; Vilanova 44'	Report	Grindal 19'; Yonge 59'

Umpires:
Benjamin Messerli (SUI)
Alia Raude (GER)

=== Pool B ===
Pos	Team	Pld	W	D	L	GF	GA	GD	Pts	Qualification
1	Belgium	3	2	1	0	12	2	+10	7	Semi-finals
2	Germany	3	2	1	0	10	2	+8	7	Semi-finals
3	Ireland	3	1	0	2	5	4	+1	3	Pool C
4	Wales	3	0	0	3	0	19	−19	0	Pool C

Source: FIH
Rules for classification: 1) points; 2) matches won; 3) goal difference; 4) goals for; 5) head-to-head result; 6) field goals for.

All times are local (UTC+1).

26 July 2026
10:00

Germany	1–0	Ireland
Pabsch 57'	Report

Umpires:
Arlette Bloks (NED)
Mahmut Çilkiz (TUR)

26 July 2026
12:00

Belgium	7–0	Wales
Matthysen 21'; Favart 26'; Denef 34'; Liessens Dujardin 37', 45', 53'; Boey 60'	Report

Umpires:
Ales Vetrovsky (CZE)
Emilia Lozano (ESP)

28 July 2026
10:00

Ireland	5–0	Wales
Lennon 15'; Le Roux 16', 31'; Field 26'; Quinn 41'	Report

Umpires:
Alia Raude (GER)
Viv Carveth (ENG)

28 July 2026
12:15

Belgium	2–2	Germany
Verhaeghe 7'; Delva 13'	Report	Pabsch 36'; Förtsch 54'

Umpires:
Emilia Lozano (ESP)
Chloe McCall (WAL)

29 July 2026
12:00

Germany	7–0	Wales
Käske 28'; Tödter 39'; Schedl 41'; Pabsch 45'; Förtsch 53'; Keller 54'; Schönhoff 55'	Report

Umpires:
Thalia Bellemans (BEL)
Viv Carveth (ENG)

29 July 2026
12:20

Ireland	0–3	Belgium
	Report	Denef 15' van Hecke 36'; Favart 54'

Umpires:
Una Mihajlović (CRO)
Lukasz Orzeł (POL)

== Classification round ==
=== Pool C ===
Pos	Team	Pld	W	D	L	GF	GA	GD	Pts	Relegation
1	England	3	3	0	0	15	4	+11	9	
2	Scotland	3	1	1	1	6	7	−1	4	
3	Ireland	3	1	0	2	9	6	+3	3	Relegation to 2028 EuroHockey Junior Championship II
4	Wales	3	0	1	2	3	16	−13	1	Relegation to 2028 EuroHockey Junior Championship II

Source: FIH
Rules for classification: 1) points; 2) matches won; 3) goal difference; 4) goals for; 5) head-to-head result; 6) field goals for.

31 July 2026
16:30

England	4–3	Ireland
Moore 12'; Breed 16'; Martin 38'; Mills 47'	Report	Lennon 47'; Fulton 49'; Quinn 46'

Umpires:
Chloe McCall (WAL)
Una Mihajlović (CRO)

31 July 2026
18:50

Scotland	3–3	Wales
Wadsworth 34', 52'; Low 45'	Report	Whittlestone 5'; Digby-Duell 25'; Moat 48'

Umpires:
Lukasz Orzeł (POL)
Viv Carveth (ENG)

1 August 2026
15:40

England	8–0	Wales
Breed 4'; Mills 6'; Grindal 30'; Smith 35'; Gardens 43'; Yonge 45'; Moore 48', 53'	Report

Umpires:
Thalia Bellemans (BEL)
Una Mihajlović (CRO)

1 August 2026
18:00

Ireland	1–2	Scotland
Lennon 9'	Report	Wadsworth 24'; Nelli 33'

Umpires:
Arlette Bloks (NED)
Alia Raude (GER)

== Medal round ==
=== Bracket ===
Semi-finals
31 July
Netherlands	4
Germany	0
31 July
Belgium	2 (3)
Spain (p.s.o)	2 (4)

Final
1 August
Netherlands	2
Spain	1
Third place
1 August
Germany	3
Belgium	0

=== Semi-finals ===
31 July 2026
16:50

Netherlands	4–0	Germany
Verstraeten 17', 36', 56'; Horst 49'	Report

Umpires:
Emilia Lozano (ESP)
Thalia Bellemans (BEL)

31 July 2026
19:10

Belgium	2–2	Spain
Van den Abeele 5'; Favart 54'	Report	Vilanova 31'; Fernández 55'
Penalties
van den Abeele (penalty shoot-out scored) van Hecke (penalty shoot-out missed); Matthysen (penalty shoot-out scored); Denef (penalty shoot-out missed); Delva (penalty shoot-out scored) van den Abeele (penalty shoot-out missed)	3–4	(penalty shoot-out missed) Alcaraz; (penalty shoot-out scored) Fernández; (penalty shoot-out missed) Sáenz de Santa María; (penalty shoot-out scored) Fernández; (penalty shoot-out scored) Martí; (penalty shoot-out scored) Martí

Umpires:
Arlette Bloks (NED)
Sarah Craig (IRL)

=== Third and fourth place ===
1 August 2026
15:20

Germany	3–0	Belgium
Schwarz 17'; Pabsch 24'; Schönhoff 44'	Report

Umpires:
Emilia Lozano (ESP)
Viv Carveth (ENG)

=== Final ===
1 August 2026
20:00

Netherlands	2–1	Spain
Verstraeten 44'; Sauer 45'	Report	Marques 10'

Umpires:
Sarah Craig (IRL)
Ole Ingwersen (GER)

== Final standings ==
Pos	Team	Qualification or relegation
1st place, gold medalist(s)	Netherlands	Qualification for the 2027 Junior World Cup
2nd place, silver medalist(s)	Spain (H)	Qualification for the 2027 Junior World Cup
3rd place, bronze medalist(s)	Germany	Qualification for the 2027 Junior World Cup
4	Belgium	Qualification for the 2027 Junior World Cup
5	England	Qualification for the 2027 Junior World Cup
6	Scotland	Qualification for the 2027 Junior World Cup
7	Ireland (Q, R)	Qualification for the 2027 Junior World Cup & Relegation to the U21 Championship II
8	Wales (R)	Relegation to the U21 Championship II

Source: FIH
(H) Host; (Q) Qualified to the phase indicated; (R) Relegated

== Goalscorers ==
There were 94 goals scored in 20 matches, for an average of 4.7 goals per match.

6 goals

- (Netherlands) Imke Verstraeten

5 goals

- (Netherlands) Maud van den Heuvel

4 goals

- (Germany) Franziska Pabsch
- (Netherlands) Lieve Wijckmans

3 goals

- (Belgium) Agathe Favart
- (Belgium) Victoria Liessens Dujardin
- (England) Biba Mills
- (England) Mia Moore
- (England) Isabella Yonge
- (Ireland) Rebekah Lennon
- (Netherlands) Juul Sauer
- (Scotland) Ava Wadsworth
- (Spain) Natalie Vilanova

2 goals

- (Belgium) Lisl Denef
- (England) Olivia Breed
- (England) Bethany Gardens
- (England) Evie Grindal
- (England) Evie Smith
- (Germany) Ella Förtsch
- (Germany) Annika Schönhoff
- (Ireland) Hollai Quinn
- (Ireland) Maedbh le Roux
- (Spain) Carlota González

1 goal

- (Belgium) Fee van den Abeele
- (Belgium) Bobby Boey
- (Belgium) Hélène Delva
- (Belgium) Louise van Hecke
- (Belgium) Alexine Matthysen
- (Belgium) Romaine Verhaeghe
- (England) Sofia Martin
- (Germany) Victoria Käske
- (Germany) Lena Keller
- (Germany) Julia Schedl
- (Germany) Jessica Schwarz
- (Germany) Emelie Tödter
- (Ireland) Isobel Field
- (Ireland) Milla Fulton
- (Netherlands) Veere ter Horst
- (Netherlands) Iris de Kemp
- (Netherlands) Katerina Langedijk
- (Netherlands) Kaatje Walhof
- (Scotland) Mhairi Low
- (Scotland) Lexie Macmillan
- (Scotland) Caterina Nelli
- (Spain) Marta Armenteras
- (Spain) Carmen Fernández
- (Spain) Alejandra de la Llama
- (Spain) Anna Marques
- (Wales) Samantha Digby-Duell
- (Wales) Eloise Moat
- (Wales) Nancy Whittlestone

Source: FIH

== See also ==
- 2026 Men's EuroHockey U21 Championship
- 2026 Men's EuroHockey U21 Championship II
- 2026 Women's EuroHockey U21 Championship II
