= Beth Alexander =

English field hockey player (born 2003)

Personal information
- Full name: Bethan Alexander
- Born: 7 August 2003 (age 22) England

Sport
- Sport: Field hockey
- Position: Midfield
- Club: Loughborough Students
National team
Years	Team	Caps	Goals
2022–2024	England U–21	16	(5)
2024–	England	4	(0)
Medal record
Women's field hockey
Representing England
FIH Junior World Cup
Bronze medal – third place	2022 Potchefstroom	Team
EuroHockey U–21 Championship
Bronze medal – third place	2024 Terrassa	Team

Bethan Alexander (born 7 August 2003) is a field hockey player from England.

== Early life and education ==
Alexander attended the Grange School in Cheshire before going on to study at Loughborough University.

== Career ==
=== Under–21 ===
In 2021, Alexander was named in the England U–21 for the FIH Junior World Cup in Potchefstroom. The competition was later postponed to 2022, with Alexander retaining her place in the squad. At the delayed event, she broke her hand in the opening match against South Africa, resulting in her absence for the remainder of the tournament. The team went on to win England's first ever bronze medal.

Alexander was named captain of the national junior team in 2023, and led the team to a fourth-place finish at her second FIH Junior World Cup held in Santiago.

At the 2024 EuroHockey U21 Championship in Terrassa, Alexander made her final appearance for the national junior team in a bronze medal triumph over Germany.

=== Senior national squad ===
Following the 2024 Summer Olympics, a restructured England squad was announced, including Alexander. She made her senior international debut in December during a match against China during the Hangzhou leg of season six of the FIH Pro League.
