= Guusje Moes =

Dutch field hockey player

Personal information
- Born: 19 October 2004 (age 21) Moergestel, Netherlands

Sport
- Sport: Field hockey
- Position: Forward
Senior career
Years	Team	Caps	Goals
2022–2024	Oranje–Rood	-	-
2024–	Kampong	-	-
National team
Years	Team	Caps	Goals
2023–2025	Netherlands U–21	17	(10)
2026–	Netherlands	0	(0)
Medal record
Women's field hockey
Representing Netherlands
World Cup
Silver medal – second place	2026 Wavre/Amstelveen
FIH Junior World Cup
Gold medal – first place	2023 Santiago
Gold medal – first place	2025 Santiago
EuroHockey U21 Championship
Gold medal – first place	2024 Terrassa

Guusje Moes (born 19 October 2004) is a field hockey player from the Netherlands.

== Personal life ==
Guusje Moes was born in Moergestel, Netherlands. Her older sister, Freeke, is also an international field hockey player.

== Career ==
=== Domestic league ===
In the Dutch Hoofdklasse, Moes is a member of the Kampong first team. She has been a member of the Kampong first squad since 2024. Prior to her move, she represented Oranje–Rood for two years.

=== Under–21 ===
Moes made her international debut at under–21 level. She was first included in the Netherlands U–21 in 2023, and was named in the squad to compete at the FIH Junior World Cup in Santiago. At the tournament, she helped the side to a gold medal, defeating Argentina in the final.

She won her second gold medal with the side in 2024, claiming the title at the EuroHockey U21 Championship in Terrassa.

In 2025 she made her final appearances for the national junior squad. She was a member of the team at her second FIH Junior World Cup, also held in Santiago. In a repeat of the previous final, the Netherlands took home gold, defeating Argentina in the final.

=== Oranje ===
Moes first appeared in national training squads in 2025. She was listed as an emergency reserve for the EuroHockey Championship in Mönchengladbach. Later that year, she was included in a 30-member initial training squad for 2026.
