= Sofia Martin =

English field hockey player (born 2005)

Personal information
- Born: 2 February 2005 (age 21) Enfield, London, England

Sport
- Sport: Field hockey
- Position: Midfield
- Club: Hampstead and Westminster
National team
Years	Team	Caps	Goals
2022–	England U–21	24	(1)
2024–	England	4	(0)
Medal record
Women's field hockey
Representing England
FIH Junior World Cup
Bronze medal – third place	2022 Potchefstroom	Team
EuroHockey U–21 Championship
Bronze medal – third place	2024 Terrassa	Team

Sofia Martin (born 2 February 2005) is a field hockey player from England.

== Early life ==
Martin is from the North London Borough of Enfield.

== Career ==
=== Under–21 ===
In 2022, Martin was named in the revised England U–21 for the FIH Junior World Cup in Potchefstroom after the tournament was rescheduled. At the delayed event, the team went on to win England's first ever bronze medal.

Martin was named in the national junior team again in 2023, and was a member of the fourth-place finishing side at her second FIH Junior World Cup held in Santiago.

At the 2024 EuroHockey U21 Championship in Terrassa, Martin won a bronze medal.

=== Senior national squad ===
Martin is a member of the Great Britain Hockey Elite Development Programme.

Following the 2024 Summer Olympics, a restructured England squad was announced, including Martin. She made her senior international debut in December during a match against China during the Hangzhou leg of season six of the FIH Pro League.

=== Awards ===
Martin was honoured as the Junior Performance Player of the Year by England Hockey in 2023.
