= Pam van der Laan =

Dutch field hockey player

Personal information
- Full name: Pam Elisa Johanna van der Laan
- Born: 26 September 2003 (age 23) Blaricum, Netherlands

Sport
- Sport: Field hockey
- Position: Defence
Senior career
Years	Team	Caps	Goals
2022–	Pinoke	-	-
National team
Years	Team	Caps	Goals
2022–	Netherlands	3	(0)
2022–	Netherlands U–21	5	(2)
Medal record
Women's field hockey
Representing Netherlands
EuroHockey Championship
Gold medal – first place	2025 Mönchengladbach
FIH Pro League
Silver medal – second place	2021–22
Junior World Cup
Gold medal – first place	2023 Santiago
EuroHockey U21 Championship
Gold medal – first place	2024 Terrassa
EuroHockey Junior Championship
Bronze medal – third place	2022 Ghent

Pam Elisa Johanna van der Laan (born 26 September 2003) is a field hockey player from the Netherlands.

== Personal life ==
Pam was born and raised in Blaricum.

== Career ==
=== Domestic ===
In the Dutch Hoofdklasse, van der Laan represents Pinoké.

=== Under–21 ===
Van der Laan made her debut for the Netherlands U–21 team in 2022. She was a member of the bronze medal-winning team at the EuroHockey Junior Championship in Ghent.

In 2023, won gold with the FIH Junior World Cup in Santiago.

In 2024, gold medal-winningteam U21 Women's EuroHockey Junior Championship in Terrassa (2 goals)

=== Oranje ===
Van der Laan received her first senior international call-up in 2022. She debuted for Oranje during season three of the FIH Pro League, playing her first matches against India in Bhubaneswar.
