= Georgina Gardens =

English field hockey player (born 2003)

Personal information
- Born: 16 October 2003 (age 22) England

Sport
- Sport: Field hockey
- Position: Midfield
Senior career
Years	Team	Caps	Goals
–2025	University of Exeter HC	-	-
2025–	Surbiton	-	-
National team
Years	Team	Caps	Goals
2022–2024	England U–21	25	(2)
2025–	England	6	(1)
Medal record
Women's field hockey
Representing England
FIH Junior World Cup
Bronze medal – third place	2022 Potchefstroom	Team
EuroHockey U–21 Championship
Bronze medal – third place	2024 Terrassa	Team

Georgina 'Georgie' Gardens (born 16 October 2003) is a field hockey player from England.

== Personal life ==
Gardens currently studies at the University of Exeter, and is an alumna of Framlingham College.

== Career ==
=== Domestic hockey ===
In the English Hockey League, Gardens represents Surbiton. She previously represented the University of Exeter HC.

=== Under–21 ===
In 2021, Gardens was named in the England U–21 squad for the 2022 FIH Junior World Cup in Potchefstroom. Due to the COVID-19 pandemic, the competition was later postponed resulting in squad changes, however Gardens retained her place in the side. At the delayed event, she helped the team to England's first ever bronze medal at an FIH Junior World Cup. Later that year she represented the team again at the EuroHockey U–21 Championship in Ghent.

Gardens continued to represent the English U–21 side in 2023. She featured in a Four–Nations tournament in Düsseldorf, as well as England's fourth-place finish at the FIH Junior World Cup in Santiago.

She made her final appearances for the junior squad in 2024, winning bronze at the EuroHockey U–21 Championship in Terrassa.

=== Senior national squad ===
Gardens received her maiden call up to the senior national squad in early 2025. She travelled with the team to India for the second away leg of the 2024–25 FIH Pro League. She earned her first international cap during a match against India in Bhubaneswar.

== International goals ==
The following is a list of goals scored by Gardens at international level.

Goal	Date	Location	Opponent	Score	Result	Competition	Ref.
1	22 June 2025	Lee Valley Hockey Stadium, London, United Kingdom	Spain	3–1	4–1	2024–25 FIH Pro League	
