= Trijntje Beljaars =

Dutch field hockey player

Personal information
- Born: 4 June 2004 (age 22) Eindhoven, Netherlands

Sport
- Sport: Field hockey
- Position: Forward
Senior career
Years	Team	Caps	Goals
2020–2022	Oranje Rood	-	-
2022–	SCHC	-	-
National team
Years	Team	Caps	Goals
2023–	Netherlands U–21	11	(13)
2024–	Netherlands	0	(0)
Medal record
Women's field hockey
Representing Netherlands
FIH Junior World Cup
Gold medal – first place	2023 Santiago	Team
Gold medal – first place	2025 Santiago	Team
EuroHockey U21 Championship
Gold medal – first place	2024 Terrassa	Team

Trijntje Beljaars (born 4 June 2004) is a field hockey player from the Netherlands.

== Personal life ==
Trijntje Beljaars was born on 4 June 2004, in Eindhoven.

== Career ==
=== Under–21 ===
Beljaars made her international debut at under–21 level. In 2023, she was a member of the Netherlands U–21 side at the FIH Junior World Cup in Santiago. The team won the tournament, taking home a gold medal.

At the 2024 EuroHockey U21 Championship in Terrassa, Beljaars won a gold medal.

=== Oranje ===
In 2024, Beljaars received her first call-up to the senior national team under new head coach, Raoul Ehren. She will make her senior international debut during season six of the FIH Pro League.
