= Emilia Landshut =

German field hockey player

Personal information
- Born: 2 June 2005 (age 21) Hamburg, Germany

Sport
- Sport: Field hockey
- Position: Midfield
- Club: Harvestehuder
National team
| Years | Team | Caps | Goals |
| 2024– | Germany U–21 | 5 | (1) |
| 2025– | Germany | 18 | (1) |
Medal record
Women's field hockey
Representing Germany
EuroHockey Championship
| Silver medal – second place | 2025 Mönchengladbach |

Emilia Landshut (born 2 June 2005) is a field hockey player from Germany.

== Personal life ==
Emilia Landshut is the daughter of former international player, Max Landshut.

== Field hockey ==
=== Domestic league ===
Landshut currently competes in the German Bundesliga, where she plays for Harvestehuder.

=== Under–21 ===
Landshut made her international debut at under–21 level. She received her first call-up to the national U–21 squad in 2024. She made her debut at the EuroHockey U–21 Championship in Terrassa, where the team finished in fourth place.

In 2025, she was named in the squad for the FIH Junior World Cup in Santiago.

=== Die Danas ===
Landshut was called into the squad of Die Danas in 2025. She made her senior international debut during the 2024–25 FIH Pro League, earning her first cap in a match against Spain in Bhubaneswar. Later that year she was named in the squad for the 2025 EuroHockey Championship in Mönchengladbach. At the tournament she won her first medal with a national team, taking home silver.

== International goals ==
The following table lists all goals scored by Landshut at international level.

| Goal | Date | Location | Opponent | Score | Result | Event | Ref |
|---|---|---|---|---|---|---|---|
| 1 | 15 June 2025 | Wilrijkse Plein, Antwerp, Belgium | Belgium | 2–2 | 2–2 | 2024–25 FIH Pro League | |
