= Imke Verstraeten =

Dutch field hockey player (born 2005)

Personal information
- Born: 11 January 2005 (age 21) Hulst, Netherlands

Sport
- Sport: Field hockey
- Position: Defence
Senior career
Years	Team	Caps	Goals
–	Pinoké	-	-
National team
Years	Team	Caps	Goals
2023–	Netherlands U–21	11	(3)
2024–	Netherlands	0	(0)
Medal record
Women's field hockey
Representing Netherlands
FIH Junior World Cup
Gold medal – first place	2023 Santiago	Team
Gold medal – first place	2025 Santiago	Team
EuroHockey U21 Championship
Gold medal – first place	2024 Terrassa	Team

Imke Verstraeten (born 11 January 2005) is a field hockey player from the Netherlands.

== Personal life ==
Imke Verstraeten was born on 11 January 2005, in Hulst.

== Career ==
=== Under–21 ===
Verstraeten made her international debut at under–21 level in 2023. She was a member of the gold medal-winning Netherlands U–21 squad at the FIH Junior World Cup in Santiago.

Verstraeten won a gold medal at the 2024 EuroHockey U21 Championship in Terrassa.

=== Oranje ===
In 2024, Verstraeten received her first call-up to the senior national team under new head coach, Raoul Ehren. She will make her senior international debut during season six of the FIH Pro League.
