= 2025 Women's FIH Hockey Junior World Cup =

11th edition of the Women's FIH Hockey Junior World Cup

Tournament details
- Host country: Chile
- City: Santiago
- Dates: 1–13 December
- Teams: 24 (from 5 confederations)
- Venue: Centro Deportivo de Hockey Césped Estadio Nacional

Final positions
- Champions: Netherlands (6th title)
- Runner-up: Argentina
- Third place: Belgium

Tournament statistics
- Matches played: 72
- Goals scored: 367 (5.1 per match)
- Top scorer(s): (China) Wang Lihang (Netherlands) Iris de Kemp (Netherlands) Noor van den Nieuwenhof (8 goals)
- Best player: (Netherlands) Noor van den Nieuwenhof
- Best goalkeeper: (Belgium) Maïté Bussels

The 2025 Women's FIH Hockey Junior World Cup is the 11th edition of the Women's FIH Hockey Junior World Cup, the biennial women's under-21 field hockey world championship organised by the International Hockey Federation. The tournament is held in Santiago, Chile from 1 to 13 December 2025. It is the fourth time the tournament will be hosted by Santiago, Chile. The tournament will feature 24 teams for the first time.

== Format ==
24 teams will be split into six groups and four teams and play a round-robin. After the preliminary round, the teams will be ranked in their position they finished. The group winners and the two best-second placed teams advance to the quarterfinals. The four remaining second-placed teams and the four best third-ranked teams play the 9 to 16th place playoffs and the remaining teams the 17 to 24th place games. From there on, a knockout system will be used.

== Qualification ==
Alongside the hosts, the 23 other teams qualify via the continental championships.

=== Qualified teams ===
Because only two teams participated in the Oceania qualifier the third quota from Oceania was reallocated to Europe, the continent of the next highest placed team in the Junior World Ranking.

| Dates | Event | Location | Quotas | Qualifier(s) |
|---|---|---|---|---|
| 3–12 July 2024 | 2024 Junior Pan American Championship | Surrey, Canada | 4 | Argentina; United States; Uruguay; Canada |
| 14–20 July 2024 | 2024 EuroHockey U21 Championship | Terrassa, Spain | 7 | Austria; Belgium; England; Germany; Ireland; Netherlands; Spain |
| 16–20 July 2024 | 2024 EuroHockey U21 Championship II | Rakovník, Czech Republic | 1 | Wales |
| 16–20 July 2024 | 2024 EuroHockey U21 Championship II | Konya, Türkiye | 1 | Scotland |
| 2 December 2024 | Hosts | —N/a | 1 | Chile |
| 7–15 December 2024 | 2024 Junior Asia Cup | Muscat, Oman | 5 | India; China; South Korea; Japan; Malaysia |
| 30 January – 2 February 2025 | 2025 Junior Oceania Cup | Auckland, New Zealand | 2 | Australia; New Zealand |
| 18–27 April 2025 | 2024 Junior Africa Cup | Windhoek, Namibia | 3 | Namibia; South Africa; Zimbabwe |
| Total | | | 24 | |

== Squads ==
Players born on or after 1 January 2004 were eligible to compete in the tournament.

== Preliminary round ==
The draw was held on 12 June 2025, during a ceremony in Santiago.

=== Pool A ===
| Pos | Team | Pld | W | D | L | GF | GA | GD | Pts | Qualification |
|---|---|---|---|---|---|---|---|---|---|---|
| 1 | Netherlands | 3 | 3 | 0 | 0 | 31 | 0 | +31 | 9 | Quarter-finals |
| 2 | Japan | 3 | 2 | 0 | 1 | 7 | 10 | −3 | 6 | 9–16th place classification |
| 3 | Chile | 3 | 1 | 0 | 2 | 2 | 13 | −11 | 3 | 17–24th place classification |
| 4 | Malaysia | 3 | 0 | 0 | 3 | 1 | 18 | −17 | 0 | 17–24th place classification |

Source: FIH
Rules for classification: 1) points; 2) matches won; 3) goal difference; 4) goals for; 5) head-to-head result; 6) field goals scored.

1 December 2025
15:45

| Japan | 4–1 | Malaysia |
|---|---|---|
| Yoshida 5'; Saito 8'; Tabuchi 10'; Usui 56' | Report | Hartomo 21' |

Umpires:
Irene Presenqui (ARG)
Claudia Montino (CHI)

1 December 2025
20:15

| Netherlands | 10–0 | Chile |
|---|---|---|
| Verstraeten 1', 7'; Moes 5', 36'; Beljaars 9'; Van den Nieuwenhof 14', 29', 53', 55'; Van den Heuvel 39' | Report |

Umpires:
Tamara Leonard (AUS)
Katie Howie (SCO)

3 December 2025
18:00

| Japan | 0–8 | Netherlands |
|---|---|---|
| | Report | Moes 11', 56'; Verstraeten 21' de Kemp 31', 46'; Beljaars 36', 49' van den Nieuwenhof 43' |

Umpires:
Melissa Bennetts (RSA)
Valerie Koh (SGP)

3 December 2025
20:15

| Chile | 1–0 | Malaysia |
|---|---|---|
| Saenz 59' | Report |

Umpires:
Lani Nichol (NZL)
Shane Lewis (BAR)

5 December 2025
15:45

| Netherlands | 13–0 | Malaysia |
|---|---|---|
| Van den Nieuwenhof 5', 57'; Van den Heuvel 7', 35'; De Kemp 15', 17', 35'; Moes 19'; De Vries 33', 42'; Verstraeten 36', 49'; Beljaars 45' | Report |

Umpires:
Fatma Mahmoud (EGY)
Shane Lewis (BAR)

5 December 2025
20:15

| Chile | 1–3 | Japan |
|---|---|---|
| Arrieta 35' | Report | Saito 5'; Maruyama 24'; Yamamoto 40' |

Umpires:
Allison Mikelson (USA)
Brian Tyson (USA)

=== Pool B ===
| Pos | Team | Pld | W | D | L | GF | GA | GD | Pts | Qualification |
|---|---|---|---|---|---|---|---|---|---|---|
| 1 | Belgium | 3 | 2 | 1 | 0 | 25 | 2 | +23 | 7 | Quarter-finals |
| 2 | Argentina | 3 | 2 | 1 | 0 | 22 | 1 | +21 | 7 | Quarter-finals |
| 3 | Wales | 3 | 1 | 0 | 2 | 4 | 11 | −7 | 3 | 9–16th place classification |
| 4 | Zimbabwe | 3 | 0 | 0 | 3 | 0 | 37 | −37 | 0 | 17–24th place clasification |

Source: FIH
Rules for classification: 1) points; 2) matches won; 3) goal difference; 4) goals for; 5) head-to-head result; 6) field goals scored.

2 December 2025
15:45

| Belgium | 3–1 | Wales |
|---|---|---|
| Favart 7'; Van Remortel 19', 57' | Report | Cradden 43' |

Umpires:
Tamara Leonard (AUS)
Fatma Mahmoud (EGY)

2 December 2025
20:15

| Argentina | 13–0 | Zimbabwe |
|---|---|---|
| Stamati 8'; L. Pisthón 12', 43', 57'; P. Pisthón 19'; Alastra 40', 49'; Guignet 45', 50'; Ambrosini 52', 55', 58'; Persoglia 53' | Report |

Umpires:
Minami Inamoto (JPN)
Ana Ortega (ESP)

4 December 2025
15:45

| Zimbabwe | 0–3 | Wales |
|---|---|---|
| | Report | Cradden 40'; Witham 57'; Diamond 58' |

Umpires:
Alex Miles (CAN)
Claudia Montino (CHI)

4 December 2025
20:15

| Belgium | 1–1 | Argentina |
|---|---|---|
| De Clerck 51' | Report | Stamati 14' |

Umpires:
Tamara Leonard (AUS)
Allison Mikelson (USA)

6 December 2025
15:45

| Zimbabwe | 0–21 | Belgium |
|---|---|---|
| | Report | Van Remortel 3', 26', 34'; Dewaet 5'; Delhalle 6', 8', 44'; Verhees 7', 14', 43'; Favart 14', 27', 34', 45+'; Palfliet 17'; Geerts 25', 50'; Van Den Abeele 27'; Van Heel 43', 48'; De Clerck 49' |

Umpires:
Melissa Bennetts (RSA)
Maggie Giddens (USA)

6 December 2025
20:15

| Argentina | 8–0 | Wales |
|---|---|---|
| Guignet 2', 58'; Alastra 4'; Díaz 9'; Castellaro 24'; Stamati 32'; Ambrosini 34'; Casas 51' | Report |

Umpires:
Michiel Christiaanse (NED)
Brian Tyson (USA)

=== Pool C ===
| Pos | Team | Pld | W | D | L | GF | GA | GD | Pts | Qualification |
|---|---|---|---|---|---|---|---|---|---|---|
| 1 | Germany | 3 | 3 | 0 | 0 | 18 | 2 | +16 | 9 | Quarter-finals |
| 2 | India | 3 | 2 | 0 | 1 | 18 | 3 | +15 | 6 | 9–16th place classification |
| 3 | Ireland | 3 | 1 | 0 | 2 | 5 | 12 | −7 | 3 | 9–16th place classification |
| 4 | Namibia | 3 | 0 | 0 | 3 | 1 | 25 | −24 | 0 | 17–24th place classification |

Source: FIH
Rules for classification: 1) points; 2) matches won; 3) goal difference; 4) goals for; 5) head-to-head result; 6) field goals scored.

1 December 2025
09:00

| Germany | 7–1 | Ireland |
|---|---|---|
| Schönhoff 4'; Frerichs 7', 38'; Haid 19'; Krings 23'; Reisenegger 50'; Becker 54' | Report | R. Lennon 56' |

Umpires:
Maggie Giddens (USA)
Valerie Koh (SGP)

1 December 2025
11:15

| India | 13–0 | Namibia |
|---|---|---|
| Sakshi R. 10', 23'; Kanika 12', 30', 45'; Binima 14'; Sonam 14'; Sakshi S. 27'; Hina 35', 35', 45'; Ishika 36'; Manisha 60' | Report |

Umpires:
Melissa Bennetts (RSA)
Brian Tyson (USA)

3 December 2025
09:00

| Ireland | 4–1 | Namibia |
|---|---|---|
| Quinn 2', 17'; Fulton 18'; McCourt 37' | Report | A. Coetzee 59' |

Umpires:
Ayanna McClean (TTO)
Fatma Mahmoud (EGY)

3 December 2025
11:15

| India | 1–3 | Germany |
|---|---|---|
| Hina 58' | Report | Frerichs 5'; Schönhoff 52'; Reisenegger 59' |

Umpires:
Maggie Giddens (USA)
Juan Pedro Rodríguez (ARG)

5 December 2025
09:00

| Ireland | 0–4 | India |
|---|---|---|
| | Report | Kanika 12'; Purnima 42', 58'; Sakshi R. 57' |

Umpires:
Irene Presenqui (ARG)
Claudia Montino (CHI)

5 December 2025
11:15

| Germany | 8–0 | Namibia |
|---|---|---|
| Krings 6', 36', 39', 44'; Hachenberg 19'; Frerichs 21'; Reisenegger 25'; Becker 30' | Report |

Umpires:
Melina Illanes (ARG)
Minami Inamoto (JPN)

=== Pool D ===
| Pos | Team | Pld | W | D | L | GF | GA | GD | Pts | Qualification |
|---|---|---|---|---|---|---|---|---|---|---|
| 1 | China | 3 | 2 | 1 | 0 | 17 | 2 | +15 | 7 | Quarter-finals |
| 2 | England | 3 | 2 | 1 | 0 | 13 | 3 | +10 | 7 | Quarter-finals |
| 3 | South Africa | 3 | 1 | 0 | 2 | 5 | 9 | −4 | 3 | 9–16th place classification |
| 4 | Austria | 3 | 0 | 0 | 3 | 1 | 22 | −21 | 0 | 17–24th place classification |

Source: FIH
Rules for classification: 1) points; 2) matches won; 3) goal difference; 4) goals for; 5) head-to-head result; 6) field goals scored.

2 December 2025
09:00

| South Africa | 4–1 | Austria |
|---|---|---|
| Du Plessis 10', 42'; Mokoena 17', 53' | Report | Proksch 20' |

Umpires:
Melina Illanes (ARG)
Brian Tyson (USA)

2 December 2025
11:15

| England | 2–2 | China |
|---|---|---|
| Grindal 14'; Mills 49' | Report | Hao 12'; Zou L. 36' |

Umpires:
Maggie Giddens (USA)
Shane Lewis (BAR)

4 December 2025
09:00

| South Africa | 1–4 | England |
|---|---|---|
| Mokoena 56' | Report | Robinson 10'; Bingham 44'; Mills 49', 50' |

Umpires:
Ana Ortega (ESP)
Irene Presenqui (ARG)

4 December 2025
11:15

| China | 11–0 | Austria |
|---|---|---|
| Wei 3'; Li J. 8', 20'; Hao 23', 58'; Tan 30'; Wang L. 36', 39', 49'; Zuo 40'; Hu 45' | Report |

Umpires:
Melina Illanes (ARG)
Katie HOWIE (SCO)

6 December 2025
09:00

| China | 4–0 | South Africa |
|---|---|---|
| Wang L. 30', 38'; Tan 40'; Zuo 49' | Report |

Umpires:
Alex Miles (CAN)
Valerie Koh (SGP)

6 December 2025
11:15

| England | 7–0 | Austria |
|---|---|---|
| Moore 11', 55'; Bingham 34', 38'; Dunn 52'; Grindal 53'; Hippe 60' | Report |

Umpires:
Fatma Mahmoud (EGY)
Lani Nichol (NZL)

=== Pool E ===
| Pos | Team | Pld | W | D | L | GF | GA | GD | Pts | Qualification |
|---|---|---|---|---|---|---|---|---|---|---|
| 1 | Australia | 3 | 3 | 0 | 0 | 13 | 3 | +10 | 9 | Quarter-finals |
| 2 | Spain | 3 | 2 | 0 | 1 | 13 | 4 | +9 | 6 | 9–16th place classification |
| 3 | Scotland | 3 | 0 | 1 | 2 | 1 | 6 | −5 | 1 | 17–24th place classification |
| 4 | Canada | 3 | 0 | 1 | 2 | 2 | 16 | −14 | 1 | 17–24th place classification |

Source: FIH
Rules for classification: 1) points; 2) matches won; 3) goal difference; 4) goals for; 5) head-to-head result; 6) field goals scored.

2 December 2025
13:30

| Australia | 6–1 | Canada |
|---|---|---|
| Lawton 5'; Mathison 15'; Jones 16', 60'; Howell 25'; Surha 34' | Report | Girgis 42' |

Umpires:
Katie Howie (SCO)
Claudia Montino (CHI)

2 December 2025
18:00

| Spain | 2–0 | Scotland |
|---|---|---|
| Gardsjord 17'; Madariaga 54' | Report |

Umpires:
Lani Nichol (NZL)
Allison Mikelson (USA)

4 December 2025
13:30

| Canada | 1–1 | Scotland |
|---|---|---|
| Furber 31' | Report | Low 8' |

Umpires:
Valerie Koh (SGP)
Ayanna McClean (TTO)

4 December 2025
18:00

| Spain | 2–4 | Australia |
|---|---|---|
| Zubizarreta 40'; Vilanova 47' | Report | Surha 15+'; Jones 18'; Kenny 26'; Howell 39' |

Umpires:
Melissa Bennetts (RSA)
Juan Pedro Rodríguez (ARG)

6 December 2025
13:30

| Australia | 3–0 | Scotland |
|---|---|---|
| Surha 11'; Stansby 15'; Kenny 49' | Report |

Umpires:
Minami Inamoto (JPN)
Juan Pedro Rodríguez (ARG)

6 December 2025
18:00

| Canada | 0–9 | Spain |
|---|---|---|
| | Report | Gardsjord 15'; Vilanova 28', 34'; Madariaga 29'; Canales 32'; De la Llama 33'; Alcaraz 36'; Sáenz de Santa María 52'; Gifra 55' |

Umpires:
Shane Lewis (BAR)
Ayanna McClean (TTO)

=== Pool F ===
| Pos | Team | Pld | W | D | L | GF | GA | GD | Pts | Qualification |
|---|---|---|---|---|---|---|---|---|---|---|
| 1 | United States | 3 | 3 | 0 | 0 | 12 | 3 | +9 | 9 | Quarter-finals |
| 2 | Uruguay | 3 | 1 | 1 | 1 | 7 | 8 | −1 | 4 | 9–16th place classification |
| 3 | South Korea | 3 | 1 | 0 | 2 | 5 | 9 | −4 | 3 | 9–16th place classification |
| 4 | New Zealand | 3 | 0 | 1 | 2 | 7 | 11 | −4 | 1 | 17–24th place classification |

Source: FIH
Rules for classification: 1) points; 2) matches won; 3) goal difference; 4) goals for; 5) head-to-head result; 6) field goals scored.

1 December 2025
13:30

| South Korea | 2–3 | Uruguay |
|---|---|---|
| Lee S. 32'; Joo 60' | Report | Haidukowski 31'; Ch. Curcio 49'; Rodríguez 56' |

Umpires:
Allison Mikelson (USA)
Ana Ortega (ESP)

1 December 2025
18:00

| United States | 5–2 | New Zealand |
|---|---|---|
| McVeigh 17', 31'; Hollamon 24'; Schoenbeck 46'; D'Ariano 48' | Report | G. Findlay 41', 52' |

Umpires:
Ayanna McClean (TTO)
Juan Pedro Rodríguez (ARG)

3 December 2025
13:30

| New Zealand | 3–3 | Uruguay |
|---|---|---|
| G. Findlay 15'; McKenzie 21'; Shotter 59' | Report | Luis 10'; Trigo 18'; Haidukowski 27' |

Umpires:
Irene Presenqui (ARG)
Brian Tyson (USA)

3 December 2025
15:45

| South Korea | 0–4 | United States |
|---|---|---|
| | Report | Adams 11'; Bradford 23'; McVeigh 43'; Abello 50' |

Umpires:
Minami Inamoto (JPN)
Alex Miles (CAN)

5 December 2025
13:30

| New Zealand | 2–3 | South Korea |
|---|---|---|
| Surridge 31', 45' | Report | Lee S. 48'; Park H. 50'; Hong 58' |

Umpires:
Maggie Giddens (USA)
Katie Howie (SCO)

5 December 2025
18:00

| United States | 3–1 | Uruguay |
|---|---|---|
| Mendez-Trendler 14'; Bradford 36'; E. Beach 51' | Report | Curcio 42' |

Umpires:
Ana Ortega (ESP)
Lani Nichol (NZL)

=== Rankings ===
Following the completion of the pool stage, teams will be ranked according to their final group position to determine the classification round schedule.

==== First placed teams ====
| Pos | Pool | Team | Pld | W | D | L | GF | GA | GD | Pts | Qualification |
|---|---|---|---|---|---|---|---|---|---|---|---|
| 1 | A | Netherlands | 3 | 3 | 0 | 0 | 31 | 0 | +31 | 9 | Quarter-finals |
| 2 | C | Germany | 3 | 3 | 0 | 0 | 18 | 2 | +16 | 9 | Quarter-finals |
| 3 | E | Australia | 3 | 3 | 0 | 0 | 13 | 3 | +10 | 9 | Quarter-finals |
| 4 | F | United States | 3 | 3 | 0 | 0 | 12 | 3 | +9 | 9 | Quarter-finals |
| 5 | B | Belgium | 3 | 2 | 1 | 0 | 25 | 2 | +23 | 7 | Quarter-finals |
| 6 | D | China | 3 | 2 | 1 | 0 | 17 | 2 | +15 | 7 | Quarter-finals |

Source: FIH
Rules for classification: 1) points; 2) matches won; 3) goal difference; 4) goals for; 5) head-to-head result; 6) field goals scored.

==== Second placed teams ====
| Pos | Pool | Team | Pld | W | D | L | GF | GA | GD | Pts | Qualification |
|---|---|---|---|---|---|---|---|---|---|---|---|
| 1 | B | Argentina | 3 | 2 | 1 | 0 | 22 | 1 | +21 | 7 | Quarter-finals |
| 2 | D | England | 3 | 2 | 1 | 0 | 13 | 3 | +10 | 7 | Quarter-finals |
| 3 | C | India | 3 | 2 | 0 | 1 | 18 | 3 | +15 | 6 | Ninth to sixteenth place classification |
| 4 | E | Spain | 3 | 2 | 0 | 1 | 13 | 4 | +9 | 6 | Ninth to sixteenth place classification |
| 5 | A | Japan | 3 | 2 | 0 | 1 | 7 | 10 | −3 | 6 | Ninth to sixteenth place classification |
| 6 | F | Uruguay | 3 | 1 | 1 | 1 | 7 | 8 | −1 | 4 | Ninth to sixteenth place classification |

Source: FIH
Rules for classification: 1) points; 2) matches won; 3) goal difference; 4) goals for; 5) head-to-head result; 6) field goals scored.

==== Third placed teams ====
| Pos | Pool | Team | Pld | W | D | L | GF | GA | GD | Pts | Qualification |
|---|---|---|---|---|---|---|---|---|---|---|---|
| 1 | D | South Africa | 3 | 1 | 0 | 2 | 5 | 9 | −4 | 3 | Ninth to sixteenth place classification |
| 2 | F | South Korea | 3 | 1 | 0 | 2 | 5 | 9 | −4 | 3 | Ninth to sixteenth place classification |
| 3 | C | Ireland | 3 | 1 | 0 | 2 | 5 | 12 | −7 | 3 | Ninth to sixteenth place classification |
| 4 | B | Wales | 3 | 1 | 0 | 2 | 4 | 11 | −7 | 3 | Ninth to sixteenth place classification |
| 5 | A | Chile | 3 | 1 | 0 | 2 | 2 | 13 | −11 | 3 | Seventeenth to twenty-fourth place classification |
| 6 | E | Scotland | 3 | 0 | 1 | 2 | 1 | 6 | −5 | 1 | Seventeenth to twenty-fourth place classification |

Source: FIH
Rules for classification: 1) points; 2) matches won; 3) goal difference; 4) goals for; 5) head-to-head result; 6) field goals scored.

==== Fourth placed teams ====
| Pos | Pool | Team | Pld | W | D | L | GF | GA | GD | Pts | Qualification |
|---|---|---|---|---|---|---|---|---|---|---|---|
| 1 | F | New Zealand | 3 | 0 | 1 | 2 | 7 | 11 | −4 | 1 | Seventeenth to twenty-fourth place classification |
| 2 | E | Canada | 3 | 0 | 1 | 2 | 2 | 16 | −14 | 1 | Seventeenth to twenty-fourth place classification |
| 3 | A | Malaysia | 3 | 0 | 0 | 3 | 1 | 18 | −17 | 0 | Seventeenth to twenty-fourth place classification |
| 4 | D | Austria | 3 | 0 | 0 | 3 | 1 | 22 | −21 | 0 | Seventeenth to twenty-fourth place classification |
| 5 | C | Namibia | 3 | 0 | 0 | 3 | 1 | 25 | −24 | 0 | Seventeenth to twenty-fourth place classification |
| 6 | B | Zimbabwe | 3 | 0 | 0 | 3 | 0 | 37 | −37 | 0 | Seventeenth to twenty-fourth place classification |

Source: FIH
Rules for classification: 1) points; 2) matches won; 3) goal difference; 4) goals for; 5) head-to-head result; 6) field goals scored.

== Seventeenth to twenty-fourth place classification ==
=== Bracket ===
Play-offs
7 December
New Zealand | 7
Austria | 2
8 December
Scotland | 4
Namibia | 0
8 December
Canada (p.s.o.) | 3 (5)
Malaysia | 3 (3)
7 December
Chile | 6
Zimbabwe | 1

Crossovers
10 December
New Zealand | 2 (2)
Scotland (p.s.o.) | 2 (3)
10 December
Canada | 0
Chile | 2

Seventeenth place
12 December
Scotland (p.s.o.) | 1 (4)
Chile | 1 (3)
Nineteenth place
12 December
New Zealand | 2
Canada | 0

=== Play-offs ===
7 December 2025
13:30

| New Zealand | 7–2 | Austria |
|---|---|---|
| Pho 8', 26'; Surridge 18'; E. Findlay 22'; G. Findlay 34', 37'; McKenzie 42' | Report | Haselsteiner 20'; M. Pelz 55' |

Umpires:
Juan Pedro Rodríguez (ARG)
Melina Illanes (ARG)

7 December 2025
18:00

| Chile | 6–1 | Zimbabwe |
|---|---|---|
| Müller 9', 46'; Caravia 11'; Luders 14'; Rojas 23'; Arrieta 32' | Report | Elijah 59' |

Umpires:
Minami Inamoto (JPN)
Ayanna McClean (TTO)

8 December 2025
09:00

| Canada | 3–3 | Malaysia |
|---|---|---|
| Girgis 9'; Poulakis 28', 60' | Report | N. Mohd 1'; Hartomo 21'; Azhairy 44' |
Penalties
| Girgis (penalty shoot-out scored); Furber (penalty shoot-out scored); Le (penalty shoot-out scored); Poulakis (penalty shoot-out scored); Malinowski (penalty shoot-out scored) | 5–3 | (penalty shoot-out scored) Mohammed; (penalty shoot-out scored) Mazlan; (penalty shoot-out scored) Muhamad; (penalty shoot-out missed) S. Mohd |

Umpires:
Fatma Mahmoud (EGY)
Irene Presenqui (ARG)

8 December 2025
11:15

| Scotland | 4–0 | Namibia |
|---|---|---|
| Low 5', 40', 57'; MacMillan 55' | Report |

Umpires:
Melina Illanes (ARG)
Brian Tyson (USA)

=== Twenty-first to twenty-fourth place classification ===
==== Bracket ====
Cross-overs
10 December
Austria | 3
Namibia | 1
10 December
Malaysia (p.s.o.) | 3 (5)
Zimbabwe | 3 (3)

Twenty-first place
13 December
Austria | 3
Malaysia | 1
Twenty-third place
13 December
Namibia | 1
Zimbabwe | 2

==== Crossovers ====
10 December 2025
09:00

| Austria | 3–1 | Namibia |
|---|---|---|
| Bauer 9'; Proksch 22', 31' | Report | Philander 5' |

Umpires:
Minami Inamoto (JPN)
Claudia Montino (CHI)

10 December 2025
11:15

| Malaysia | 3–3 | Zimbabwe |
|---|---|---|
| Tamjit 14'; Ridzuan 33'; Muhamad 50' | Report | Hares 54'; Tozana 56'; Winsor 59' |
Penalties
| Tarmizi (penalty shoot-out scored); S. Mohd (penalty shoot-out scored); Muhamad (penalty shoot-out scored); Che (penalty shoot-out scored); N. Mohd (penalty shoot-out scored) | 5–3 | (penalty shoot-out scored) Elijah; (penalty shoot-out scored) Mzizi; (penalty shoot-out scored) Tozana; (penalty shoot-out missed) Matambo |

Umpires:
Katie Howie (SCO)
Valerie Koh (SGP)

==== Twenty-third and twenty-fourth place ====
13 December 2025
09:00

| Namibia | 1–2 | Zimbabwe |
|---|---|---|
| Kruger 7' | Report | Bvute 14'; Kambadza 40' |

Umpires:
Fatma Mahmoud (EGY)
Melina Illanes (ARG)

==== Twenty-first and twenty-second place ====
13 December 2025
11:15

| Austria | 3–1 | Malaysia |
|---|---|---|
| Damm 13'; Proksch 34', 50' | Report | N. Mohd 28' |

Umpires:
Katie Howie (SCO)
Juan Pedro Rodríguez (ARG)

=== Seventeenth to twentieth place classification ===
==== Crossovers ====
10 December 2025
13:30

| New Zealand | 2–2 | Scotland |
|---|---|---|
| McKenzie 38'; H. Findlay 52' | Report | Nelli 12'; Low 12' |
Penalties
| E. Findlay (penalty shoot-out missed); Bond (penalty shoot-out scored); Pho (penalty shoot-out missed); Irwin (penalty shoot-out scored); Surridge (penalty shoot-out missed) | 2–3 | (penalty shoot-out missed) Nelli; (penalty shoot-out scored) Roxburgh; (penalty shoot-out scored) Low; (penalty shoot-out scored) Wadsworth |

Umpires:
Ana Ortega (ESP)
Alex Miles (CAN)

10 December 2025
20:15

| Canada | 0–2 | Chile |
|---|---|---|
| | Report | Luders 24'; Müller 48' |

Umpires:
Brian Tyson (USA)
Shane Lewis (BAR)

==== Nineteenth and twentieth place ====
12 December 2025
18:00

| New Zealand | 2–0 | Canada |
|---|---|---|
| McKenzie 1'; G. Findlay 60' | Report |

Umpires:
Allison Mikelson (USA)
Claudia Montino (CHI)

==== Seventeenth and eighteenth place ====
12 December 2025
20:15

| Scotland | 1–1 | Chile |
|---|---|---|
| Cain 50' | Report | Parada 43' |
Penalties
| Nelli (penalty shoot-out scored); Low (penalty shoot-out missed); Roxburgh (penalty shoot-out missed); Wadsworth (penalty shoot-out scored); Garden (penalty shoot-out scored); Nelli (penalty shoot-out scored) | 4–3 | (penalty shoot-out missed) Gutiérrez; (penalty shoot-out scored) Pérez; (penalty shoot-out scored) F. Barrios; (penalty shoot-out missed) Saenz; (penalty shoot-out scored) Parada; (penalty shoot-out missed) Parada |

Umpires:
Brian Tyson (USA)
Valerie Koh (SGP)

== Ninth to sixteenth place classification ==
=== Bracket ===
Play-offs
7 December
India | 3
Wales | 1
7 December
Uruguay (p.s.o.) | 1 (3)
South Africa | 1 (1)
7 December
Spain | 3
Ireland | 0
7 December
Japan (p.s.o.) | 2 (4)
South Korea | 2 (3)

Crossovers
9 December
India (p.s.o.) | 1 (3)
Uruguay | 1 (1)
9 December
Spain | 1
Japan | 0

Ninth place
11 December
India | 1
Spain | 2
Eleventh place
11 December
Uruguay | 0
Japan | 1

=== Play-offs ===
7 December 2025
09:00

| Uruguay | 1–1 | South Africa |
|---|---|---|
| Ca. Curcio 58' | Report | Blows 48' |
Penalties
| Haidukowski (penalty shoot-out missed); Arregui (penalty shoot-out scored); Martínez (penalty shoot-out missed); Myszka (penalty shoot-out scored); Rodríguez (penalty shoot-out scored) | 3–1 | (penalty shoot-out missed) Janse van Vuuren; (penalty shoot-out scored) Augousti; (penalty shoot-out missed) Mokoena; (penalty shoot-out missed) De la Rey |

Umpires:
Shane Lewis (BAR)
Alex Miles (CAN)

7 December 2025
11:15

| Japan | 2–2 | South Korea |
|---|---|---|
| Ohtsuka 28'; Saito 43' | Report | Lee S. 18'; Cho 60+' |
Penalties
| Tetsuka (penalty shoot-out scored); Kaneko (penalty shoot-out missed); Yoshida (penalty shoot-out scored); Tanaka (penalty shoot-out scored); Hiramitsu (penalty shoot-out scored) | 4–3 | (penalty shoot-out scored) Park S. (penalty shoot-out scored) Han Nar-yeong; (penalty shoot-out scored) Hong; (penalty shoot-out missed) Lee Jih. (penalty shoot-out missed) Park M. |

Umpires:
Allison Mikelson (USA)
Claudia Montino (CHI)

7 December 2025
15:45

| Spain | 3–0 | Ireland |
|---|---|---|
| Armenteras 7'; Alcaraz 8', 41' | Report |

Umpires:
Valerie Koh (SGP)
Irene Presenqui (ARG)

7 December 2025
20:15

| India | 3–1 | Wales |
|---|---|---|
| Hina 14'; Toppo 24'; Ishika 31' | Report | Moat 52' |

Umpires:
Ana Ortega (ESP)
Katie Howie (SCO)

=== Thirteenth to sixteenth place classification ===
==== Bracket ====
Cross-overs
9 December
Wales | 2
South Africa | 0
9 December
Ireland | 2
South Korea | 1

Thirteenth place
11 December
Wales | 0
Ireland | 3
Fifteenth place
11 December
South Africa | 5
South Korea | 0

==== Crossovers ====
9 December 2025
09:00

| Ireland | 2–1 | South Korea |
|---|---|---|
| Fulton 32'; Curran 43' | Report | Park S. 54' |

Umpires:
Claudia Montino (CHI)
Lani Nichol (NZL)

9 December 2025
15:45

| Wales | 2–0 | South Africa |
|---|---|---|
| Forey 35'; Edwards 37' | Report |

Umpires:
Melissa Bennetts (RSA)
Fatma Mahmoud (EGY)

==== Fifteenth and sixteenth place ====
11 December 2025
13:30

| South Africa | 5–0 | South Korea |
|---|---|---|
| Tromp 4', 37'; Metu 20'; Mokoena 25'; De la Rey 57' | Report |

Umpires:
Fatma Mahmoud (EGY)
Lani Nichol (NZL)

==== Thirteenth and fourteenth place ====
11 December 2025
15:45

| Wales | 0–3 | Ireland |
|---|---|---|
| | Report | Errico 14'; Fulton 52'; Handcock 55' |

Umpires:
Maggie Giddens (USA)
Ana Ortega (ESP)

=== Ninth to twelfth place classification ===
==== Crossovers ====
9 December 2025
11:15

| Spain | 1–0 | Japan |
|---|---|---|
| Vilanova 9' | Report |

Umpires:
Ayanna McClean (TTO)
Brian Tyson (USA)

9 December 2025
13:30

| India | 1–1 | Uruguay |
|---|---|---|
| Manisha 19' | Report | Arregui 60' |
Penalties
| Yadav (penalty shoot-out scored); Ishika (penalty shoot-out scored); Kanika (penalty shoot-out scored) | 3–1 | (penalty shoot-out scored) Guerrero; (penalty shoot-out missed) Arregui; (penalty shoot-out missed) Martinez; (penalty shoot-out missed) Myszka |

Umpires:
Melina Illanes (ARG)
Tamara Leonard (AUS)

==== Eleventh and twelfth place ====
11 December 2025
13:30

| Uruguay | 0–1 | Japan |
|---|---|---|
| | Report | Hayasuke 34' |

Umpires:
Shane Lewis (BAR)
Tamara Leonard (AUS)

==== Ninth and tenth place ====
11 December 2025
20:15

| India | 1–2 | Spain |
|---|---|---|
| Kanika 41' | Report | Vilanova 16'; Canales 36' |

Umpires:
Minami Inamoto (JPN)
Irene Presenqui (ARG)

== Medal round ==
=== Bracket ===
Quarter-finals
8 December
Netherlands | 8
England | 2
8 December
United States | 1
Belgium | 4
8 December
Germany | 1
Argentina | 2
8 December
Australia | 3
China | 5

Semi-finals
10 December
Netherlands (p.s.o.) | 0 (3)
Belgium | 0 (0)
10 December
Argentina | 3
China | 0

Final
13 December
Netherlands | 2
Argentina | 1
Third place
13 December
Belgium | 5
China | 1

=== Quarter-finals ===
8 December 2025
13:30

| Netherlands | 8–2 | England |
|---|---|---|
| Walhof 5', 42'; De Kemp 18', 42', 43'; Van den Nieuwenhof 31'; Moes 33'; Langedijk 54' | Report | Mills 27'; Gardens 46' |

Umpires:
Alex Miles (CAN)
Tamara Leonard (AUS)

8 December 2025
15:45

| United States | 1–4 | Belgium |
|---|---|---|
| D'Ariano 59' | Report | Van Remortel 2' de Clerck 31'; Van Heel 33'; Favart 34' |

Umpires:
Juan Pedro Rodríguez (ARG)
Melissa Bennetts (RSA)

8 December 2025
18:00

| Australia | 3–5 | China |
|---|---|---|
| Kenny 4'; Jones 52', 55' | Report | Wang L. 4', 28', 31'; Nie 31'; Zuo 42' |

Umpires:
Lani Nichol (NZL)
Valerie Koh (SGP)

8 December 2025
20:15

| Germany | 1–2 | Argentina |
|---|---|---|
| Lubienski 42' | Report | Castellaro 41'; Falasco 52' |

Umpires:
Ana Ortega (ESP)
Allison Mikelson (USA)

=== Fifth to eighth place classification ===
==== Bracket ====
Cross-overs
11 December
England | 1
United States | 2
11 December
Germany | 1
Australia | 0

Fifth place
12 December
United States | 1
Germany | 3
Seventh place
12 December
England | 2
Australia | 3

==== Crossovers ====
11 December 2025
13:30

| England | 1–2 | United States |
|---|---|---|
| Dunn 53' | Report | Bent-Cole 23'; D'Ariano 54' |

11 December 2025
15:45

| Germany | 1–0 | Australia |
|---|---|---|
| Haid 11' | Report |

==== Seventh and eighth place ====
12 December 2025
13:30

| England | 2–3 | Australia |
|---|---|---|
| Dyson 28'; Boss 42' | Report | Howell 38', 40'; Love 41' |

Umpires:
Ayanna McClean (TTO)
Katie Howie (SCO)

==== Fifth and sixth place ====
12 December 2025
15:45

| United States | 1–3 | Germany |
|---|---|---|
| Mendez-Trendler 51' | Report | Frerichs 27'; Krings 32'; Haid 37' |

Umpires:
Alex Miles (CAN)
Melissa Bennetts (RSA)

=== First to fourth place classification ===
==== Semi-finals ====
10 December 2025
15:45

| Netherlands | 0–0 | Belgium |
|---|---|---|
| | Report |
Penalties
| Moes (penalty shoot-out scored); Muller (penalty shoot-out missed); Jansen (penalty shoot-out scored); Van den Nieuwenhof (penalty shoot-out scored) | 3–0 | (penalty shoot-out missed) Van Heel; (penalty shoot-out missed) Dewaet; (penalty shoot-out missed) De Clerck |

Umpires:
Irene Presenqui (ARG)
Juan Pedro Rodríguez (ARG)

10 December 2025
18:00

| Argentina | 3–0 | China |
|---|---|---|
| Alastra 36', 53'; Díaz 45' | Report |

Umpires:
Allison Mikelson (USA)
Ayanna McClean (TTO)

==== Third and fourth place ====
13 December 2025
18:00

| Belgium | 5–1 | China |
|---|---|---|
| Dewaet 14', 43'; Favart 31'; Van Remortel 32'; Van Hecke 45' | Report | Zuo 52' |

Umpires:
Tamara Leonard (AUS)
Lani Nichol (NZL)

==== Final ====
13 December 2025
20:15

| Netherlands | 2–1 | Argentina |
|---|---|---|
| Tellier 25'; Moes 28' | Report | Casas 38' |

Umpires:
Ana Ortega (ESP)
Maggie Giddens (USA)

== Statistics ==
=== Final standings ===
| Pos | Team |
|---|---|
| 1st place, gold medalist(s) | Netherlands |
| 2nd place, silver medalist(s) | Argentina |
| 3rd place, bronze medalist(s) | Belgium |
| 4 | China |
| 5 | Germany |
| 6 | United States |
| 7 | Australia |
| 8 | England |
| 9 | Spain |
| 10 | India |
| 11 | Japan |
| 12 | Uruguay |
| 13 | Ireland |
| 14 | Wales |
| 15 | South Africa |
| 16 | South Korea |
| 17 | Scotland |
| 18 | Chile (H) |
| 19 | New Zealand |
| 20 | Canada |
| 21 | Austria |
| 22 | Malaysia |
| 23 | Zimbabwe |
| 24 | Namibia |

Source: FIH
(H) Host

=== Awards ===
The following awards were given at the conclusion of the tournament.

| Award | Player |
|---|---|
| Player of the tournament | (Netherlands) Noor van den Nieuwenhof |
| Goalkeeper of the tournament | (Belgium) Maïté Bussels |
| Top goalscorer | (China) Wang Lihang (Netherlands) Iris de Kemp (Netherlands) Noor van den Nieuwenhof |

=== Goalscorers ===
There were 367 goals scored in 72 matches, for an average of 5.1 goals per match.

8 goals

- (China) Wang Lihang
- (Netherlands) Iris de Kemp
- (Netherlands) Noor van den Nieuwenhof

7 goals

- (Belgium) Agathe Favart
- (Belgium) Alexi van Remortel
- (Netherlands) Guusje Moes

6 goals

- (Germany) Lynn Krings
- (New Zealand) Greer Findlay

5 goals

- (Argentina) Milagros Alastra
- (Australia) Makayla Jones
- (Austria) Katharina Proksch
- (Germany) Lena Frerichs
- (India) Hina Bano
- (India) Kanika Siwach
- (Netherlands) Imke Verstraeten
- (Scotland) Mhairi Low
- (Spain) Natalia Vilanova

4 goals

- (Argentina) Chiara Ambrosini
- (Argentina) Sol Guignet
- (Australia) Mihaylia Howell
- (China) Zuo Dandan
- (England) Biba Mills
- (Netherlands) Trijntje Beljaars
- (New Zealand) Niamh McKenzie
- (South Africa) Ntsopa Mokoena

3 goals

- (Argentina) Lourdes Pisthón
- (Argentina) Catalina Stamati
- (Australia) Madeline Kenny
- (Australia) Jamie-Lee Surha
- (Belgium) Perrine de Clerck
- (Belgium) Chloé Delhalle
- (Belgium) Louise Dewaet
- (Belgium) Famke van Heel
- (Belgium) Emilie Verhees
- (Chile) Laura Müller
- (China) Hao Guoting
- (England) Lottie Bingham
- (Germany) Katharina Haid
- (Germany) Martina Reisenegger
- (India) Sakshi Rana
- (Ireland) Milla Fulton
- (Japan) Hanami Saito
- (Netherlands) Maud van den Heuvel
- (New Zealand) Emelia Surridge
- (South Korea) Lee Su-gyeong
- (Spain) Marta Alcaraz
- (United States) Reese D'Ariano
- (United States) Alaina McVeigh

2 goals

- (Argentina) Lara Casas
- (Argentina) Juana Castellaro
- (Argentina) Zoe Díaz
- (Belgium) Marthe-Marie Geerts
- (Canada) Kenzie Girgis
- (Canada) Nicole Poulakis
- (Chile) Victoria Arrieta
- (Chile) Josefa Luders
- (China) Li Jingyi
- (China) Tan Lei
- (England) Sienna Dunn
- (England) Evie Grindal
- (England) Mia Moore
- (Germany) Katharina Becker
- (Germany) Annika Schönhoff
- (India) Ishika
- (India) Manisha
- (India) Purnima Yadav
- (Ireland) Hollai Quinn
- (Malaysia) Zawiatul Hartomo
- (Malaysia) Nur Mohd
- (Netherlands) Mea de Vries
- (Netherlands) Kaatje Walhof
- (New Zealand) Riana Pho
- (South Africa) Leah du Plessis
- (South Africa) Anja Tromp
- (South Korea) Hong Solbeotnara
- (Spain) Esther Canales
- (Spain) Anna Gardsjord
- (Spain) Victoria Madariaga
- (United States) Maci Bradford
- (United States) Daniela Mendez-Trendler
- (Uruguay) Chiara Curcio
- (Uruguay) Melina Haidukowski
- (Wales) Amy Cradden

1 goal

- (Argentina) Victoria Falasco
- (Argentina) Delfina Persoglia
- (Argentina) Pilar Pisthón
- (Australia) Josie Lawton
- (Australia) Samantha Love
- (Australia) Camryn Mathison
- (Australia) Evie Stansby
- (Austria) Katharina Bauer
- (Austria) Anna Damm
- (Austria) Anja Haselsteiner
- (Austria) Marie Pelz
- (Belgium) Loes Palfliet
- (Belgium) Louise van Hecke
- (Belgium) Fee van Den Abeele
- (Canada) Zoe Furber
- (Chile) Isidora Caravia
- (Chile) Maite Parada
- (Chile) Catalina Rojas
- (Chile) Javiera Saenz
- (China) Hu Linyuan
- (China) Nie Yushuo
- (China) Wei Qixiao
- (China) Zou Lizhe
- (England) Hannah Boss
- (England) Jessica Dyson
- (England) Beth Gardens
- (England) Josefina Hippe
- (England) Freya Robinson
- (Germany) Johanna Hachenberg
- (Germany) Gesa Lubienski
- (India) Binima Dhan
- (India) Sonam
- (India) Sakshi Shukla
- (India) Sunelita Toppo
- (Ireland) Eabha Curran
- (Ireland) Matilde Errico
- (Ireland) Amy Handcock
- (Ireland) Rebekah Lennon
- (Ireland) Maia McCourt
- (Japan) Sana Hayasuke
- (Japan) Niko Maruyama
- (Japan) Minami Ohtsuka
- (Japan) Sena Tabuchi
- (Japan) Ayano Usui
- (Japan) Rina Yamamoto
- (Japan) Rei Yoshida
- (Malaysia) Azmyra Azhairy
- (Malaysia) Zati Muhamad
- (Malaysia) Nurdini Ridzuan
- (Malaysia) Nor Tamijt
- (Namibia) Anthea Coetzee
- (Namibia) Maryke Kruger
- (Namibia) Azaylee Philander
- (Netherlands) Katerina Langedijk
- (Netherlands) Ivy Tellier
- (New Zealand) Emma Findlay
- (New Zealand) Hannah Findlay
- (New Zealand) Georgie Shotter
- (Scotland) Jennifer Cain
- (Scotland) Lexie MacMillan
- (Scotland) Caterina Nelli
- (South Africa) Jodie Blows
- (South Africa) Teshawn de la Rey
- (South Africa) Thabelani Metu
- (South Korea) Joo So-yeon
- (South Korea) Park Hyeon-jeong
- (South Korea) Park Seo-yeon
- (Spain) Marta Armenteras
- (Spain) Mireia Gifra
- (Spain) Teresa Sáenz de Santa María
- (Spain) Leire Zubizarreta
- (Spain) Alejandra de la Llama
- (United States) Mia Abello
- (United States) Mary Adams
- (United States) Ella Beach
- (United States) Olivia Bent-Cole
- (United States) Josie Hollamon
- (United States) Mia Schoenbeck
- (Uruguay) Justina Arregui
- (Uruguay) Carolina Curcio
- (Uruguay) Valentina Luis
- (Uruguay) María Rodríguez
- (Uruguay) Sofia Trigo
- (Wales) Freya Diamond
- (Wales) Matilda Edwards
- (Wales) Olivia Forey
- (Wales) Eloise Moat
- (Wales) Caitlin Witham
- (Zimbabwe) Nyasha Bvute
- (Zimbabwe) Tinodiwanashe Elijah
- (Zimbabwe) Chelsey-Lee Hares
- (Zimbabwe) Panaka Kambadza
- (Zimbabwe) Amber Tozana
- (Zimbabwe) Rebeca Winsor

Source: FIH

== See also ==
- 2025 Men's FIH Hockey Junior World Cup
