= Eline Jansen (field hockey) =

Dutch field hockey player

Personal information
- Born: 1 August 2004 (age 22) Utrecht, Netherlands

Sport
- Sport: Field hockey
- Position: Midfield
Senior career
Years	Team	Caps	Goals
–	Kampong	-	-
National team
Years	Team	Caps	Goals
2023–	Netherlands U–21	11	(3)
2024–	Netherlands	3	(0)
Medal record
Women's field hockey
Representing Netherlands
World Cup
Silver medal – second place	2026 Wavre/Amstelveen
FIH Junior World Cup
Gold medal – first place	2023 Santiago	Team
Gold medal – first place	2025 Santiago	Team
EuroHockey U21 Championship
Gold medal – first place	2024 Terrassa	Team

Eline Jansen (born 1 August 2004) is a field hockey player from the Netherlands.

== Personal life ==
Eline Jansen was born in Utrecht. She is currently a student at Utrecht University.

== Career ==
=== Under–21 ===
Jansen made her international debut at under–21 level. In 2023, she was a member of the Netherlands U–21 squad at the FIH Junior World Cup in Santiago, where she won a gold medal.

In 2024 she represented the team again, winning gold at the EuroHockey U21 Championship in Terrassa.

=== Oranje ===
Jansen received her first call-up to the senior national team under new head coach, Raoul Ehren in 2024. She made her senior international debut during season six of the FIH Pro League.

== Sponsorship ==
Jansen is currently sponsored by Ritual Hockey.
