= Eline Jansen =

Eline Jansen may refer to:

- Eline Jansen (cyclist) (born 2002), Dutch cyclist and speed skater
- Eline Jansen (field hockey) (born 2004), Dutch field hockey player
