= EuroHockey Junior Championship =

EuroHockey Junior Championship may refer to:

- Men's EuroHockey U21 Championship
- Women's EuroHockey U21 Championship
