= Katharina Haid =

German field hockey player

Personal information
- Born: 13 April 2004 (age 22) Germany

Sport
- Sport: Field hockey
- Position: Midfield
- Club: Club an der Alster
National team
Years	Team	Caps	Goals
2023–	Germany U–21	15	(4)
2024–	Germany	2	(0)
Medal record
Women's field hockey
Representing Germany

Katharina Haid (born 13 April 2004) is a field hockey player from Germany.

== Career ==
=== Domestic league ===
Haid currently competes in the German Bundesliga, where she plays for Club an der Alster. She has also represented the team at the 2024 edition of the EuroHockey Club Trophy.

=== Under–21 ===
Haid made her international debut at under–21 level. She received her first call-up to the national U–21 squad in 2024. She made her debut during a Four–Nations Tournament in Düsseldorf. She also represented the squad at the 2023 FIH Junior World Cup in Santiago.

At the 2024 EuroHockey U–21 Championship in Terrassa, she was a member of the team that finished fourth.

In 2025 she was named captain of the junior squad, and will lead the team at her second FIH Junior World Cup in Santiago.

=== Die Danas ===
Haid was called into the squad of Die Danas in 2024. She made her senior international debut during the 2024–25 FIH Pro League, earning her first cap in a match against Argentina in Santiago del Estero.
