= Charlotte Bingham (field hockey) =

English field hockey player (born 2005)

Lottie Bingham
Personal information
- Born: 18 December 2005 (age 20) England

Sport
- Sport: Field hockey
- Position: Forward
- Club: University of Birmingham
National team
| Years | Team | Caps | Goals |
| 2023– | England U–21 | 15 | (4) |
| 2024– | England | 4 | (2) |
Medal record
Women's field hockey
Representing England
EuroHockey U–21 Championship
| Bronze medal – third place | 2024 Terrassa | Team |

Charlotte "Lottie" Bingham (born 18 December 2005) is a field hockey player from England.

== Career ==
=== Under–21 ===
Bingham made her international debut at under–21 level in 2023. She made her first appearances during a four–nations tournament in Düsseldorf. She went on to represent the England U–21 side later that year at the FIH Junior World Cup held in Santiago.

At the 2024 EuroHockey U21 Championship in Terrassa, Bingham represented the national junior team again, finishing the tournament with a bronze medal.

=== Senior national squad ===
Following the 2024 Summer Olympics, a restructured England squad was announced, including Bingham. She made her senior international debut in December during a match against China during the Hangzhou leg of season six of the FIH Pro League. In just her second match, Bingham scored a brace, making her one of the youngest English players in history to do so at just 18 years of age.

==== International goals ====
| Goal | Date | Location | Opponent | Score | Result | Competition | Ref. |
|---|---|---|---|---|---|---|---|
| 1 | 2 December 2024 | Gongshu Canal Sports Park Stadium, Hangzhou, China | Belgium | 1–0 | 3–1 | 2024–25 FIH Pro League | |
| 2 | 2 December 2024 | Gongshu Canal Sports Park Stadium, Hangzhou, China | Belgium | 2–0 | 3–1 | 2024–25 FIH Pro League | |
