= 2022 Women's EuroHockey Junior Championship II =

Tournament details
- Host country: Austria
- City: Vienna
- Dates: 24–30 July
- Teams: 6 (from 1 confederation)
- Venue: Hockeystadion

Final positions
- Champions: Austria (1st title)
- Runner-up: France
- Third place: Poland

Tournament statistics
- Matches played: 15
- Goals scored: 53 (3.53 per match)
- Top scorer(s): (Czech Republic) Katerina Topinkova (Poland) Maria Drozda (Ukraine) Anastasiia Voievoda (3 goals)

The 2022 Women's EuroHockey Junior Championship II was the 12th edition of the Women's EuroHockey Junior Championship II, the second level of the women's European under-21 field hockey championships organized by the European Hockey Federation. It was held in Vienna, Austria from 24 to 30 July 2022.

== Qualified teams ==
Participating nations qualified based on their final ranking from the 2019 competition.

Dates	Event	Location	Quotas	Qualifiers
13–21 July 2019	2019 EuroHockey Junior Championship	Valencia, Spain	1	~~Belarus~~ (Note: Belarus was excluded due to their involvement in the 2022 Russian invasion of Ukraine); France
14–20 July 2019	2019 EuroHockey Junior Championship II	Alanya, Turkey	5	Austria; Czech Republic; Italy; Poland; Ukraine
Total			6	

== Results ==
=== Standings ===
Pos	Team	Pld	W	D	L	GF	GA	GD	Pts	Promotion
1	Austria (H, P)	5	3	2	0	9	4	+5	11	EuroHockey Junior Championship
2	France (P)	5	3	1	1	11	5	+6	10	EuroHockey Junior Championship
3	Poland	5	2	2	1	8	7	+1	8	
4	Italy	5	2	0	3	6	12	−6	6	
5	Czech Republic	5	1	1	3	9	12	−3	4	
6	Ukraine	5	1	0	4	10	13	−3	3	

Source: FIH
Rules for classification: 1) points; 2) matches won; 3) goal difference; 4) goals for; 5) head-to-head result; 6) field goals for.
(H) Hosts; (P) Promoted

=== Matches ===
24 July 2022
11:30

Czech Republic	4–3	Ukraine
	Report

24 July 2022
13:45

France	1–1	Poland
	Report

24 July 2022
16:00

Italy	1–3	Austria
	Report

25 July 2022
13:30

Italy	2–5	Ukraine
	Report

25 July 2022
15:45

Czech Republic	2–3	Poland
	Report

25 July 2022
18:00

Austria	2–0	France
	Report

27 July 2022
13:30

Poland	2–1	Ukraine
	Report

27 July 2022
15:45

France	3–0	Italy
	Report

27 July 2022
18:00

Austria	2–2	Czech Republic
	Report

29 July 2022
09:30

Czech Republic	0–1	Italy
	Report

29 July 2022
11:45

Ukraine	1–4	France
	Report

29 July 2022
14:00

Poland	1–1	Austria
	Report

30 July 2022
09:30

France	3–1	Czech Republic
	Report

30 July 2022
11:45

Italy	2–1	Poland
	Report

30 July 2022
14:00

Ukraine	0–1	Austria
	Report

== See also ==
- 2022 Men's EuroHockey Junior Championship II
- 2022 Women's EuroHockey Junior Championship
- 2022 Women's EuroHockey Junior Championship III
