= 2019 Women's EuroHockey Junior Championship II =

Tournament details
- Host country: Turkey
- City: Alanya
- Dates: 14–20 July
- Teams: 8 (from 1 confederation)

Final positions
- Champions: Scotland (2nd title)
- Runner-up: Italy
- Third place: Wales

Tournament statistics
- Matches played: 20
- Goals scored: 90 (4.5 per match)
- Top scorer: (Ukraine) Anastasiia Voievoda (6 goals)

The 2019 Women's EuroHockey Junior Championship II was the 11th edition of the Women's EuroHockey Junior Championship II, the second level of the women's European under-21 field hockey championships organized by the European Hockey Federation. It was held from 14 to 20 July 2019 in Alanya, Turkey.

Scotland won their second EuroHockey Junior Championship II title and were promoted to the 2022 Women's EuroHockey Junior Championship together with Wales.

== Qualified teams ==
The participating teams have qualified based on their final ranking from the 2017 competition.

Dates	Event	Location	Quotas	Qualifier(s)
16–22 July 2014	2017 EuroHockey Junior Championship II	Hradec Králové, Czech Republic	6	Austria; Czech Republic; Poland; Scotland; Turkey; Ukraine
—N/a	New entry	—N/a	2	Italy; Wales
Total			8	

== Results ==
=== Preliminary round ===
==== Pool A ====
Pos	Team	Pld	W	D	L	GF	GA	GD	Pts	Qualification
1	Ukraine	3	3	0	0	16	6	+10	9	Semi-finals
2	Italy	3	1	1	1	5	3	+2	4	Semi-finals
3	Turkey (H)	3	1	0	2	3	11	−8	3	Relegation pool
4	Poland	3	0	1	2	4	8	−4	1	Relegation pool

Source: FIH
Rules for classification: 1) points; 2) matches won; 3) goal difference; 4) goals for; 5) head-to-head result; 6) field goals for.
(H) Hosts

14 July 2017
15:45

Italy	1–2	Ukraine
	Report

14 July 2017
18:00

Poland	0–1	Turkey
	Report

16 July 2017
15:45

Poland	0–0	Italy
	Report

16 July 2017
18:00

Ukraine	7–1	Turkey
	Report

17 July 2017
15:45

Ukraine	7–4	Poland
	Report

17 July 2017
18:00

Italy	4–1	Turkey
	Report

==== Pool B ====
Pos	Team	Pld	W	D	L	GF	GA	GD	Pts	Qualification
1	Wales	3	2	1	0	4	0	+4	7	Semi-finals
2	Scotland	3	2	1	0	3	0	+3	7	Semi-finals
3	Czech Republic	3	1	0	2	2	6	−4	3	Relegation pool
4	Austria	3	0	0	3	1	4	−3	0	Relegation pool

Source: FIH
Rules for classification: 1) points; 2) matches won; 3) goal difference; 4) goals for; 5) head-to-head result; 6) field goals for.

14 July 2017
09:00

Scotland	0–0	Wales
	Report

14 July 2017
11:15

Czech Republic	2–1	Austria
	Report

15 July 2017
15:45

Wales	1–0	Austria
	Report

15 July 2017
18:00

Czech Republic	0–2	Scotland
	Report

17 July 2017
09:00

Scotland	1–0	Austria
	Report

17 July 2017
11:15

Wales	3–0	Czech Republic
	Report

=== Fifth to eighth place classification ===
==== Pool C ====
The points obtained in the preliminary round against the other team are taken over.

Pos	Team	Pld	W	D	L	GF	GA	GD	Pts	Relegation
5	Czech Republic	3	2	1	0	12	5	+7	7	
6	Poland	3	1	1	1	6	6	0	4	
7	Austria	3	1	0	2	9	10	−1	3	
8	Turkey (H)	3	1	0	2	7	13	−6	3	EuroHockey Junior Championship III

Source: FIH
Rules for classification: 1) points; 2) matches won; 3) goal difference; 4) goals for; 5) head-to-head result; 6) field goals for.
(H) Hosts

19 July 2017
09:00

Poland	4–3	Austria
	Report

19 July 2017
11:15

Turkey	2–8	Czech Republic
	Report

20 July 2017
09:00

Turkey	4–5	Austria
	Report

20 July 2017
11:15

Czech Republic	2–2	Poland
	Report

=== First to fourth place classification ===
Semi-finals
19 July
Ukraine	1
Scotland	4
19 July
Wales	4 (1)
Italy (s.o.)	4 (2)

Final
20 July
Scotland	4
Italy	1
Third place
20 July
Ukraine	1
Wales	3

==== Semi-finals ====
19 July 2017
15:45

Ukraine	1–4	Scotland
	Report

19 July 2017
18:00

Wales	4–4	Italy
	Report
Penalties
	1–2

==== Third place game ====
20 July 2017
15:45

Ukraine	1–3	Wales
	Report

==== Final ====
20 July 2017
18:00

Scotland	4–1	Italy
	Report

== Statistics ==
=== Final standings ===
Pos	Team	Promotion or relegation
1	Scotland	Promotion to the EuroHockey Junior Championship
2	Italy	Not eligible for promotion due to late withdrawal in 2017
3	Wales	Promotion to the EuroHockey Junior Championship
4	Ukraine	
5	Czech Republic	
6	Poland	
7	Austria	
8	Turkey (H)	Relegation to the EuroHockey Junior Championship III

Source: FIH
(H) Host

== See also ==
- 2019 Men's EuroHockey Junior Championship II
- 2019 Women's EuroHockey Championship II
- 2019 Women's EuroHockey Junior Championship
