= 2010 Women's EuroHockey Junior Championship =

Tournament details
- Host country: France
- City: Lille
- Dates: 25–31 July
- Teams: 8 (from 1 confederation)

Final positions
- Champions: Netherlands (7th title)
- Runner-up: England
- Third place: Spain

Tournament statistics
- Matches played: 20

The 2010 Women's EuroHockey Junior Championships was the 15th edition of the Women's EuroHockey Junior Championship, an under 21 women's field hockey tournament. It was held in Lille, France, from 25–31 July 2010.

Netherlands won the tournament for the seventh time after defeating England 4–1 in the final. Spain won the bronze medal, defeating Germany 2–1 in the third place playoff.

== Participating nations ==
Alongside the host nation, 7 teams competed in the tournament.

- Belarus
- England
- France
- Germany
- Lithuania
- Netherlands
- Scotland
- Spain

== Results ==
=== Preliminary round ===
==== Pool A ====
Pos	Team	Pld	W	D	L	GF	GA	GD	Pts	Qualification
1	Germany	3	3	0	0	12	2	+10	9	Semi-finals
2	Spain	3	2	0	1	7	4	+3	6	Semi-finals
3	Belarus	3	1	0	2	5	10	−5	3	
4	Scotland	3	0	0	3	4	12	−8	0	

Source: EuroHockey
Rules for classification: 1) points; 2) goal difference; 3) goals scored; 4) head-to-head result.

25 July 2010
10:30

Germany	3–0	Spain
Bremer 3'; Keibel 7'; Sehlmann 56'	Report

25 July 2010
12:45

Belarus	4–2	Scotland
	Report

26 July 2010
10:30

Spain	4–1	Scotland
Queralt 8'; Baumberger 22'; Puig 45'; Riera 58'	Report	Johnston 32'

26 July 2010
12:45

Belarus	1–5	Germany
50'	Report	Van Bodegom 7'; Keibel 32'; Grambusch 41'; Willig 43'; Jeute 56'

28 July 2010
10:30

Germany	4–1	Scotland
Faust 4'; Keibel 47'; Willig 61'; Mävers 70'	Report	59'

28 July 2010
12:45

Spain	3–0	Belarus
Guinea 15'; Giné 20'; Riera 25'	Report

==== Pool B ====
Pos	Team	Pld	W	D	L	GF	GA	GD	Pts	Qualification
1	Netherlands	3	3	0	0	12	1	+11	9	Semi-finals
2	England	3	2	0	1	6	6	0	6	Semi-finals
3	Lithuania	3	0	1	2	2	6	−4	1	
4	France	3	0	1	2	3	10	−7	1	

Source: EuroHockey
Rules for classification: 1) points; 2) goal difference; 3) goals scored; 4) head-to-head result.

25 July 2010
15:00

Netherlands	2–0	Lithuania
	Report

25 July 2010
17:15

England	3–1	France
Bray 17'; Webb 43'; Pearce 67'	Report	Billore 55'

26 July 2010
15:15

England	1–5	Netherlands
Turner 42'	Report	Verbruggen 4', 44'; Van Maasakker 27', 38'; Hulsen 51'

26 July 2010
17:30

Lithuania	2–2	France
	Report

28 July 2010
15:15

Lithuania	0–2	England
	Report	McCallin 20'; Newton 65'

28 July 2010
17:30

Netherlands	5–0	France
	Report

=== Classification round ===
==== Fifth to eighth place classification ====
===== Pool C =====
Pos	Team	Pld	W	D	L	GF	GA	GD	Pts	Relegation
1	Belarus	3	2	0	1	6	6	0	6	
2	France	3	1	1	1	6	6	0	4	
3	Lithuania	3	1	1	1	3	3	0	4	Relegated to 2012 EuroHockey Junior Championship II
4	Scotland	3	1	0	2	5	5	0	3	Relegated to 2012 EuroHockey Junior Championship II

Source: EuroHockey
Rules for classification: 1) points; 2) goal difference; 3) goals scored; 4) head-to-head result.

==== First to fourth place classification ====
Semi-finals
30 July 2010
Germany	2 (8)
England (p.s.o)	2 (9)
30 July 2010
Netherlands	2
Spain	0

Final
31 July 2010
England	1
Netherlands	4
Third Place
31 July 2010
Germany	1
Spain (a.e.t)	2

===== Semi-finals =====
30 July 2010
15:00

Netherlands	2–0	Spain
	Report

30 July 2010
17:30

Germany	2–2	England
Faust 3'; Keibel 26'	Report	Wood 29', 37'
Penalties
Frank (penalty shoot-out scored); Müller-Wieland (penalty shoot-out missed); Steindor (penalty shoot-out scored); Van Bodegom (penalty shoot-out scored); Sehlmann (penalty shoot-out scored) —— Frank (penalty shoot-out scored); Van Bodegom (penalty shoot-out scored); Müller-Wieland (penalty shoot-out scored); Steindor (penalty shoot-out scored); Sehlmann (penalty shoot-out missed)	8–9	(penalty shoot-out scored) Pearce; (penalty shoot-out scored) Bray; (penalty shoot-out scored) Turnbull; (penalty shoot-out missed) McCallin; (penalty shoot-out scored) Turner —— (penalty shoot-out scored) Pearce; (penalty shoot-out scored) Bray; (penalty shoot-out scored) Turnbull; (penalty shoot-out scored) McCallin; (penalty shoot-out scored) Turner

===== Third and fourth place =====
31 July 2010
15:30

Germany	1–2 (a.e.t.)	Spain
Frank 47'	Report	López 69'; Riera 75'

===== Final =====
31 July 2010
18:00

England	1–4	Netherlands
Pearce 68'	Report
