= 2026 Women's EuroHockey U21 Championship II =

Tournament details
- Host countries: France; Austria
- Dates: 27 July–1 August
- Teams: 9 (from 1 confederation)
- Venue: 2 (in 2 host cities)

The 2026 Women's EuroHockey U21 Championship II was the 14th edition of the women's EuroHockey U21 Championship II, the second level of the women's European under-21 field hockey championships organised by the European Hockey Federation. There were two Championship II's held, namely Championship II-A and Championship II-B. Championship II-B was held in Vienna, Austria from 27 July to 1 August 2026, while Championship II-A was held in Salon-de-Provence, France from 28 July to 1 August 2026.

The winners of both tournaments, France and Czechia qualified for the 2028 EuroHockey U21 Championship and the 2027 FIH Hockey Junior World Cup.

== Championship II-A ==
2026 Women's EuroHockey U21 Championship II-A
Tournament details
- Host country: France
- City: Salon-de-Provence
- Dates: 28 July–1 August
- Teams: 4 (from 1 confederation)

Final positions
- Champions: France (4th title)
- Runner-up: Italy
- Third place: Ukraine

Tournament statistics
- Matches played: 8
- Goals scored: 34 (4.25 per match)
- Top scorer: (France) Mathilde Duffrène (5 goals)
- Best player: (France) Mathilde Duffrène
- Best goalkeeper: (Ukraine) Iryna Melezhyk

The Championship II-A was held in Salon-de-Provence, France from 28 July to 1 August 2026.

=== Qualification ===
Dates	Event	Location	Quotas	Qualifier(s)
14–20 July 2024	2024 EuroHockey Junior Championship	Terrassa, Spain	1	France
15–20 July 2024	2024 EuroHockey Junior Championship II-A	Lausanne, Switzerland	2	Italy; Lithuania
16–20 July 2024	2024 EuroHockey Junior Championship II-B	Konya, Turkey	1	Ukraine

=== Standings ===
Pos	Team	Pld	W	D	L	GF	GA	GD	Pts	Qualification
1	France (H)	3	3	0	0	17	0	+17	9	Final
2	Italy	3	1	1	1	4	6	−2	4	Final
3	Ukraine	3	0	2	1	4	10	−6	2	Third place match
4	Lithuania	3	0	1	2	1	10	−9	1	Third place match

Source: FIH
Rules for classification: 1) points; 2) matches won; 3) goal difference; 4) goals for; 5) head-to-head result; 6) field goals for.
(H) Hosts

All times are local (UTC+2)

28 July 2026
16:00

Italy	1–0	Lithuania
Mucelli 47'	Report

Umpires:
Teresa Lipsky (GER)
Luka Maya-Perez (FRA)

28 July 2026
18:15

France	6–0	Ukraine
Mekki 3'; Guillon 20'; Grunbaum 30'; Coppin 33'; Duffrène 41', 46'	Report

Umpires:
Noemi Di Bella (ITA)
Tanya Sargeant (ENG)

29 July 2026
16:00

Ukraine	1–1	Lithuania
Bezditko 23'	Report	Daukantaitė 25'

Umpires:
Luka Maya-Perez (FRA)
Tanya Sargeant (ENG)

29 July 2026
18:15

Italy	0–3	France
	Report	Coppin 34'; Guillon 43'; Mekki 56'

Umpires:
Teresa Lipsky (GER)
Sophie Parker (ENG)

31 July 2026
09:00

Ukraine	3–3	Italy
Korobkina 10'; Losytska 12'; Basanets 14'	Report	Eschoyez 1'; Cirilli 11'; Mucelli 21'

Umpires:
Sophie Parker (ENG)
Luka Maya-Perez (FRA)

31 July 2026
11:15

France	8–0	Lithuania
Raby 8', 41'; Guillon 10', 46'; Duffrène 12', 42'; Coppin 20', 35'	Report

Umpires:
Teresa Lipsky (GER)
Noemi Di Bella (ITA)

=== Third place match ===
1 August 2026
09:00

Ukraine	2–1	Lithuania
Korobkina 51'; Shybchenko 52'	Report	Zalogaitė 25'

Umpires:
Noemi Di Bella (ITA)
Tanya Sargeant (ENG)

=== Final ===
1 August 2026
11:15

France	5–0	Italy
Duffrène 2'; Cadot 13', 22'; Grunbaum 27'; Du Monceau 32'	Report

Umpires:
Teresa Lipsky (GER)
Sophie Parker (ENG)

=== Final standings ===
Pos	Team	Qualification
1st place, gold medalist(s)	France	2027 Junior World Cup and 2028 EuroHockey U21 Championship
2	Italy	
3	Ukraine	
4	Lithuania	

Source: FIH

== Championship II-B ==
2026 Women's EuroHockey U21 Championship II-B
Tournament details
- Host country: Austria
- City: Vienna
- Dates: 27 July–1 August
- Teams: 5 (from 1 confederation)

Final positions
- Champions: Czechia (1st title)
- Runner-up: Poland
- Third place: Austria

Tournament statistics
- Matches played: 10
- Goals scored: 31 (3.1 per match)
- Top scorer: (Poland) Oliwia Tujdowska (3 goals)
- Best player: (Austria) Katharina Proksch
- Best goalkeeper: (Czech Republic) Anna Linková

The Championship II-B was held in Vienna, Austria from 27 July to 1 August 2026.

=== Qualification ===
Dates	Event	Location	Quotas	Qualifier(s)
14–20 July 2024	2024 EuroHockey Junior Championship	Terrassa, Spain	1	Austria
16–20 July 2024	2024 EuroHockey Junior Championship II-A	Rakovnik, Czechia	1	Czechia
15–20 July 2024	2024 EuroHockey Junior Championship II-B	Konya, Turkey	2	Poland; Turkey
–				Switzerland

=== Standings ===
Pos	Team	Pld	W	D	L	GF	GA	GD	Pts	Qualification
1st place, gold medalist(s)	Czechia (H)	4	4	0	0	5	0	+5	12	2027 Junior World Cup and 2028 EuroHockey U21 Championship
2	Poland	4	3	0	1	14	3	+11	9	
3	Austria	4	2	0	2	6	8	−2	6	
4	Turkey	4	0	1	3	4	10	−6	1	
5	Switzerland	4	0	1	3	2	10	−8	1	

Source: FIH
Rules for classification: 1) points; 2) matches won; 3) goal difference; 4) goals for; 5) head-to-head result; 6) field goals for.
(H) Hosts

All times are local (UTC+1)

27 July 2026
15:30

Czechia	2–0	Switzerland
Nova 21'; Nová 41'	Report

Umpires:
Abigail Bolger (IRL)
Kristie Burnett (SCO)

27 July 2026
17:45

Poland	5–1	Turkey
Arciszewska 12', 32'; Krychniak 17'; Okarmus 22', 39'	Report	Baran 42'

Umpires:
Julia Wagner (SUI)
Michal Pivko (SVK)

28 July 2026
15:30

Czechia	1–0	Turkey
Dašková 55'	Report

Umpires:
Julia Wagner (SUI)
Kristie Burnett (SCO)

28 July 2026
17:45

Austria	2–1	Switzerland
Proksch 52'; Püsche 54'	Report	Hipp 59'

Umpires:
Serap Yürükoğlu (TUR)
Adam Rapl (CZE)

29 July 2026
17:45

Poland	4–1	Austria
Wochna 16'; Tujdowska 17', 47'; Bucher 19'	Report	Reisegger 41'

Umpires:
Kristie Burnett (SCO)
Serap Yürükoğlu (TUR)

30 July 2026
11:15

Turkey	1–1	Switzerland
Yildirim 19'	Report	Hardeman 54'

Umpires:
Michal Pivko (SVK)
Abigail Bolger (IRL)

31 July 2026
11:15

Switzerland	0–5	Poland
	Report	Rymer 9'; Tujdowska 27'; Wochna 33'; Bucher 38'; Kucharska 59'

Umpires:
Michal Pivko (SVK)
Adam Rapl (CZE)

31 July 2026
13:30

Czechia	1–0	Austria
Uhrová 56'	Report

Umpires:
Julia Wagner (SUI)
Abigail Bolger (IRL)

1 August 2026
10:00

Poland	0–1	Czechia
	Report	Nová 9'

Umpires:
Serap Yürükoğlu (TUR)
Michal Pivko (SVK)

1 August 2026
12:15

Austria	3–2	Turkey
Minar 5'; Riedl 22'; Proksch 37'	Report	Erkoç 53'; Yüksel 54'

Umpires:
Adam Rapl (CZE)
Kristie Burnett (SCO)

== See also ==
- 2026 Men's EuroHockey U21 Championship II
- 2026 Men's EuroHockey U21 Championship
- 2026 Women's EuroHockey U21 Championship
