= Maud van den Heuvel =

Dutch field hockey player (born 2005)

Personal information
- Full name: Maud Emily Jasmijn van den Heuvel
- Born: 25 July 2005 (age 21) Utrecht, Netherlands

Sport
- Sport: Field hockey
- Position: Forward
- Club: SCHC
National team
Years	Team	Caps	Goals
2025–	Netherlands	2	(1)
Medal record
Women's field hockey
Representing Netherlands
FIH Junior World Cup
Gold medal – first place	2025 Santiago	Team

Maud Emily Jasmijn van den Heuvel (born 7 July 2005) is a field hockey player from the Netherlands.

== Personal life ==
Maud van den Heuvel was born and raised in Utrecht.

== Career ==
=== Hoofdklasse ===
In the Dutch Hoofdklasse and the Euro Hockey League, van den Heuvel represents SCHC.

=== Oranje ===
Van den Heuvel received her first call-up to the senior national squad in 2025. Following a training block with the squad, she was named in the team for the home matches of the 2024–25 FIH Pro League in Amsterdam. She made her senior international debut during a match against Australia, and also scored a goal in the match.

== International goals ==
The following is a list of international goals scored by van den Heuvel.

Goal	Date	Location	Opponent	Score	Result	Competition	Ref.
1	8 June 2025	Wagener Stadium, Amsterdam, Netherlands	Australia	2–1	5–1	2024–25 FIH Pro League	
