= 2017 Women's EuroHockey Junior Championship II =

Tournament details
- Host country: Czech Republic
- City: Hradec Králové
- Dates: 16–22 July
- Teams: 8 (from 1 confederation)

Final positions
- Champions: Russia (2nd title)
- Runner-up: Belarus
- Third place: Czech Republic

Tournament statistics
- Matches played: 20
- Goals scored: 95 (4.75 per match)
- Top scorer: (Russia) Iuliia Sartakova (7 goals)

The 2017 Women's EuroHockey Junior Championship was the tenth edition of the Women's EuroHockey Junior Championship II, the second level of the women's European under-21 field hockey championships organized by the European Hockey Federation. It was held from 16 to 22 July 2017 in Hradec Králové, Czech Republic.

Russia won their second Women's EuroHockey Junior Championship II title and were promoted to the 2019 Women's EuroHockey Junior Championship together with the runners-up Belarus who Russia defeated 3–0 in the final.

== Qualified teams ==
Participating nations have qualified based on their final ranking from the 2014 competition.

Dates	Event	Location	Quotas	Qualifiers
20–26 July 2014	2014 EuroHockey Junior Championship	Waterloo, Belgium	2	Czech Republic; Russia
14–20 July 2014	2014 EuroHockey Junior Championship II	Vienna, Austria	6	Austria; Belarus; Poland; Scotland; Turkey; Ukraine
Total			8	

== Preliminary round ==
=== Pool A ===
Pos	Team	Pld	W	D	L	GF	GA	GD	Pts	Qualification
1	Russia	3	3	0	0	15	2	+13	9	Semi-finals
2	Czech Republic (H)	3	1	1	1	7	5	+2	4	Semi-finals
3	Scotland	3	1	1	1	4	8	−4	4	
4	Turkey	3	0	0	3	3	14	−11	0	

Source: FIH
Rules for classification: 1) points; 2) matches won; 3) goal difference; 4) goals for; 5) head-to-head result; 6) field goals for.
(H) Hosts

=== Pool B ===
Pos	Team	Pld	W	D	L	GF	GA	GD	Pts	Qualification
1	Belarus	3	3	0	0	10	4	+6	9	Semi-finals
2	Austria	3	2	0	1	6	5	+1	6	Semi-finals
3	Ukraine	3	1	0	2	6	4	+2	3	
4	Poland	3	0	0	3	0	9	−9	0	

Source: FIH
Rules for classification: 1) points; 2) matches won; 3) goal difference; 4) goals for; 5) head-to-head result; 6) field goals for.

== Fifth to eighth place classification ==
The points obtained in the preliminary round against the other team are taken over.

=== Pool C ===
Pos	Team	Pld	W	D	L	GF	GA	GD	Pts
5	Scotland	3	3	0	0	11	3	+8	9
6	Ukraine	3	2	0	1	10	6	+4	6
7	Turkey	3	1	0	2	5	7	−2	3
8	Poland	3	0	0	3	2	12	−10	0

Source: FIH
Rules for classification: 1) points; 2) matches won; 3) goal difference; 4) goals for; 5) head-to-head result; 6) field goals for.

== First to fourth place classification ==
=== Bracket ===
Semi-finals
21 July
Russia	11
Austria	1
21 July
Belarus	3
Czech Republic	1

Final
22 July
Russia	3
Belarus	0
Third place
22 July
Austria	2
Czech Republic	3

== See also ==
- 2017 Men's EuroHockey Junior Championship II
- 2017 Women's EuroHockey Junior Championship
