= Teresa Sáenz de Santa María =

Spanish field hockey player (born 2005)

Personal information
- Full name: Teresa Sáenz de Santa María Cuevas
- Born: 27 May 2005 (age 21) Santander, Spain

Sport
- Sport: Field hockey
- Position: Forward
Senior career
| Years | Team | Caps | Goals |
| –Present | RS Tenis | - | - |
National team
| Years | Team | Caps | Goals |
| 2023– | Spain U–21 | 15 | (4) |
| 2025– | Spain | 1 | (0) |
Medal record
Women's field hockey
Representing Spain
EuroHockey U21 Championship
| Silver medal – second place | 2024 Terrassa |
EuroHockey U18 Championship
| Bronze medal – third place | 2023 Krefeld |

Teresa Sáenz de Santa María Cuevas (born 27 May 2005) is a field hockey player from Spain.

== Personal life ==
Teresa Sáenz de Santa María was born and raised in Santander, Cantabria.

== Field hockey ==
=== Domestic league ===
In the Spanish national league, the Liga Iberdrola, Sáenz de Santa María represents RS Tenis.

=== Under–21 ===
Sáenz de Santa María made her junior international debut for the Spanish U–21 team in 2023. Her first junior caps came at a Four–Nations Tournament in Düsseldorf. Later that year she represented the squad again, participating in the FIH Junior World Cup in Santiago.

In 2024, Sáenz de Santa María was a member of the silver medal winning junior squad at the EuroHockey U21 Championship in Terrassa.

=== Red Sticks ===
Sáenz de Santa María received her first call-up to the national squad in 2025. She made her senior international debut in 2025, during the Sydney leg of the 2024–25 FIH Pro League.
