= Hina Bano =

Indian junior field hockey player

Hina Bano (born 10 March 2004) is an Indian Junior field hockey player from Haryana. She was selected for the Junior Indian team in 2023. She plays as a midfielder for Railway Sports Promotion Board and National Centre of Excellence, Bangalore in the domestic tournaments and for Soorma Hockey Club in the Hero Hockey India League.

== Early life ==
Bano was born in Gorakhpur, Lucknow on 10 March 2004. Her father died when she was young and her grandfather, Ujagar Ali, brought her up. Her grandfather used to work as a barber for the army personnel. She initially started as an athlete, but switched to hockey following a suggestion by school coach Abhishek. She was selected to train at Sports Authority of India hostel at Lucknow but her school principal had to visit her home to convince the family to send her to the hostel, where she trained under coach Nilam Kapoor. She is part of the North Eastern Railway Sports Association.

== Career ==
Bano represented the Junior National Team at the 2023 4 Nations Junior Women's Invitational Tournament in Düsseldorf. Later, she was part of the India women's national under-21 field hockey team at the 2023 FIH Junior World Cup at Santiago, Chile. She scored a goal in the 3–1 victory against Wales to become the second highest goal-scorer of the tournament at that stage.

She is selected for the senior Indian women's national coaching camp at SAI Bengaluru in preparation for the FIH Hockey Women's World Cup Qualifiers in March 2026 at Hyderabad.
