= 2024 Women's EuroHockey U21 Championship =

Tournament details
- Host country: Spain
- City: Terrassa
- Dates: 14–20 July
- Teams: 8 (from 1 confederation)
- Venue: Atlètic Terrassa Hockey Club

Final positions
- Champions: Netherlands (11th title)
- Runner-up: Spain
- Third place: England

Tournament statistics
- Matches played: 20
- Goals scored: 102 (5.1 per match)
- Top scorer: (Belgium) Astrid Bonami (8 goals)
- Best player: (Netherlands) Emma Reijnen
- Best goalkeeper: (England) Molly Smith

The 2024 Women's EuroHockey U21 Championship was the 21st edition of the Women's EuroHockey U21 Championship, the biennial international women's under-21 field hockey championship of Europe organised by the European Hockey Federation.

The tournament was hosted by Atlètic Terrassa Hockey Club in Terrassa, Spain from 14 to 20 July 2024, concurrently with the men's tournament. The tournament served as one of three European Qualifiers for the 2025 FIH Junior World Cup, with the top six participating nations gaining qualification.

The Netherlands won a record-extending 11th title by defeating the hosts Spain 5–3 in the final. England won the bronze medal by defeating the defending champions Germany 1–0.

== Qualified teams ==
Participating nations qualified based on their final ranking from the 2022 competitions.

Dates	Event	Location	Quotas	Qualifiers
24–30 July 2022	2022 EuroHockey Junior Championship	Ghent, Belgium	6	Belgium; England; Germany; Ireland; Netherlands; Spain
24–30 July 2022	2022 EuroHockey Junior Championship II	Vienna, Austria	2	Austria; France
Total			8	

== Preliminary round ==
=== Pool A ===
Pos	Team	Pld	W	D	L	GF	GA	GD	Pts	Qualification
1	Netherlands	3	3	0	0	17	4	+13	9	Semi-finals
2	Spain (H)	3	2	0	1	6	4	+2	6	Semi-finals
3	Belgium	3	1	0	2	9	7	+2	3	Pool C
4	France	3	0	0	3	0	17	−17	0	Pool C

Source: FIH
Rules for classification: 1) points; 2) matches won; 3) goal difference; 4) goals for; 5) head-to-head result; 6) field goals for.
(H) Hosts

14 July 2024
18:00

Netherlands	3–0	Spain
Beljaars 5'; De Kemp 25'; Van der Laan 48'	Report

Umpires:
Cynthia Clement (GHA)
Tommy Croese (BEL)

14 July 2024
20:00

Belgium	4–0	France
Marien 19'; Bonami 32', 38'; Vincent 53'	Report

Umpires:
Teresa Lipsky (GER)
Zoe Hall (ENG)

15 July 2024
17:00

Belgium	4–5	Netherlands
Geerts 34', 40', 53'; Bonami 60'	Report	Verstraeten 4'; Winter 9'; De Vries 27'; Van den Nieuwenhof 36', 58'

Umpires:
Russell Donaldson (IRE)
Ana Ortega (ESP)

15 July 2024
19:15

Spain	4–0	France
Casado 11', 60'; Petchamé 27', 44'	Report

Umpires:
Thalia Bellemans (BEL)
Ole Ingwersen (GER)

17 July 2024
20:00

Netherlands	9–0	France
Van der Laan 12'; Jansen 13'; De Vries 15', 55'; Beljaars 21', 38', 60'; Van den Nieuwenhof 33'; Müller 56'	Report

Umpires:
Russell Donaldson (IRE)
Teresa Lipsky (GER)

17 July 2024
20:15

Spain	2–1	Belgium
Sola 38'; Sáenz 60'	Report	Bonami 1'

Umpires:
Alex Fedenczuk (SCO)
Anatole Platel (FRA)

=== Pool B ===
Pos	Team	Pld	W	D	L	GF	GA	GD	Pts	Qualification
1	Germany	3	3	0	0	15	0	+15	9	Semi-finals
2	England	3	2	0	1	13	3	+10	6	Semi-finals
3	Ireland	3	1	0	2	2	9	−7	3	Pool C
4	Austria	3	0	0	3	1	19	−18	0	Pool C

Source: FIH
Rules for classification: 1) points; 2) matches won; 3) goal difference; 4) goals for; 5) head-to-head result; 6) field goals for.

14 July 2024
10:00

England	8–1	Austria
Gardens 10', 47'; Long 24'; Spavin 29'; Dyson 32'; Bingham 49'; Robinson 51'; Breed 56'	Report	Frey 42'

Umpires:
Thalia Bellemans (BEL)
Ellie Duffy (IRE)

14 July 2024
12:00

Germany	4–0	Ireland
Schedl 3'; Krings 4'; Reisenegger 34'; Fischer 44'	Report

Umpires:
Michal Pivko (SVK)
Amar Chudasama (ENG)

16 July 2024
10:00

Ireland	2–0	Austria
Mackey 27'; O'Shea 36'	Report

Umpires:
Zoe Hall (ENG)
Marius Cuadrat (ESP)

16 July 2024
12:15

England	0–2	Germany
	Report	Schedl 18'; Krings 19'

Umpires:
Clare Barwood (WAL)
Cynthia Clement (GHA)

17 July 2024
12:00

Germany	9–0	Austria
Schedl 9'; Landshut 13'; Keller 22'; Krings 27', 52'; Plüth 32', 49'; Gans 45'; Haid 54'	Report

Umpires:
Cynthia Clement (GHA)
Tommy Croese (BEL)

17 July 2024
12:15

Ireland	0–5	England
	Report	Alexander 13'; Hippe 19'; Spavin 37'; Long 49'; Dyson 55'

Umpires:
Manouk Bakker (NED)
Ana Ortega (ESP)

== Classification round ==
=== Pool C ===
Pos	Team	Pld	W	D	L	GF	GA	GD	Pts	Relegation
1	Belgium	3	3	0	0	14	0	+14	9	
2	Ireland	3	2	0	1	5	5	0	6	
3	France	3	1	0	2	4	8	−4	3	Relegation to 2026 EuroHockey Junior Championship II
4	Austria	3	0	0	3	1	11	−10	0	Relegation to 2026 EuroHockey Junior Championship II

Source: FIH
Rules for classification: 1) points; 2) matches won; 3) goal difference; 4) goals for; 5) head-to-head result; 6) field goals for.

19 July 2024
09:45

France	2–1	Austria
Rimbert 24'; Jardemar 49'	Report	Proksch 58'

Umpires:
Marius Cuadrat (ESP)
Ellie Duffy (IRL)

19 July 2024
12:00

Belgium	3–0	Ireland
Moors 9'; Bonami 33'; Schreurs 37'	Report

Umpires:
Michal Pivko (SVK)
Mahmut Çilkiz (TUR)

20 July 2024
09:30

Belgium	7–0	Austria
Bonami 3', 5', 24'; Vincent 3'; Goffinet 5'; Schreurs 29', 44'	Report

Umpires:
Mahmut Çilkiz (TUR)
Amar Chudasama (ENG)

20 July 2024
09:45

Ireland	3–2	France
Mackey 2'; O'Shea 48'; Moore 50'	Report	Jardemar 14'; Lassalle 27'

Umpires:
Clare Barwood (WAL)
Tommy Croese (BEL)

== Medal round ==
=== Bracket ===
Semi-finals
19 July
Netherlands	7
England	0
19 July
Germany	2
Spain	3

Final
20 July
Netherlands	5
Spain	3
Third place
20 July
England	1
Germany	0

=== Semi-finals ===
19 July 2024
10:00

Netherlands	7–0	England
Van den Nieuwenhof 4', 55'; Verstraeten 21', 35'; De Kemp 39'; Winter 40'; Moes 52'	Report

Umpires:
Teresa Lipsky (GER)
Ana Ortega (ESP)

19 July 2024
12:15

Germany	2–3	Spain
Krings 3'; Keller 38'	Report	Casado 24', 29'; Carmona 40'

Umpires:
Thalia Bellemans (BEL)
Amar Chudasama (ENG)

=== Third and fourth place ===
20 July 2024
11:45

England	1–0	Germany
Dyson 30'	Report

Umpires:
Russell Donaldson (IRL)
Anatole Platel (FRA)

=== Final ===
20 July 2024
17:45

Netherlands	5–3	Spain
Beljaars 1'; Van den Nieuwenhof 39', 46'; Jansen 55'; Moes 59'	Report	Sáenz 52', 53'; Casado 54'

Umpires:
Zoe Hall (ENG)
Teresa Lipsky (GER)

== Statistics ==
=== Final standings ===
Pos	Team	Qualification or relegation
1st place, gold medalist(s)	Netherlands	Qualification for the 2025 Junior World Cup
2nd place, silver medalist(s)	Spain (H)	Qualification for the 2025 Junior World Cup
3rd place, bronze medalist(s)	England	Qualification for the 2025 Junior World Cup
4	Germany	Qualification for the 2025 Junior World Cup
5	Belgium	Qualification for the 2025 Junior World Cup
6	Ireland	Qualification for the 2025 Junior World Cup
7	France (R)	Relegation to the U21 Championship II
8	Austria (R)	Relegation to the U21 Championship II

Source: FIH
(H) Host; (R) Relegated

=== Goalscorers ===
There were 102 goals scored in 20 matches, for an average of 5.1 goals per match.

8 goals

- (Belgium) Astrid Bonami

7 goals

- (Netherlands) Noor van den Nieuwenhof

5 goals

- (Germany) Lynn Krings
- (Netherlands) Trijntje Beljaars
- (Spain) Lucía Casado

3 goals

- (Belgium) Marthe-Marie Geerts
- (Belgium) Noa Schreurs
- (England) Jessica Dyson
- (Germany) Julia Schedl
- (Netherlands) Imke Verstraeten
- (Netherlands) Mea de Vries
- (Spain) Teresa Sáenz de Santa María

2 goals

- (Belgium) Ophélie Vincent
- (England) Georgina Gardens
- (England) Madeleine Long
- (England) Scarlett Spavin
- (France) Adele Jardemar
- (Germany) Lena Keller
- (Germany) Laura Plüth
- (Ireland) Lucy Mackey
- (Ireland) Leah O'Shea
- (Netherlands) Eline Jansen
- (Netherlands) Iris de Kemp
- (Netherlands) Pam van der Laan
- (Netherlands) Guusje Moes
- (Netherlands) Mette Winter
- (Spain) Estel Petchamé

1 goal

- (Austria) Franziska Frey
- (Austria) Philippa Proksch
- (Belgium) Eva Goffinet
- (Belgium) Alix Marien
- (Belgium) Lisa Moors
- (England) Bethan Alexander
- (England) Charlotte Bingham
- (England) Olivia Breed
- (England) Josefina Hippe
- (England) Freya Robinson
- (France) Matheá Lassalle
- (France) Marie-Alice Rimbert
- (Germany) Marie Fischer
- (Germany) Taja Gans
- (Germany) Katharina Haid
- (Germany) Emilia Landshut
- (Germany) Martina Reisenegger
- (Ireland) Lauren Moore
- (Netherlands) Noa Müller
- (Spain) Sara Carmona
- (Spain) Mar Sola

Source: FIH

== See also ==
- 2024 Women's EuroHockey U21 Championship II
- 2024 Men's EuroHockey U21 Championship
