= Germany women's national under-21 field hockey team =

Germany
- Association: German Hockey Federation (Deutscher Hockey-Bund)
- Confederation: EHF (Europe)
- Head Coach: Akim Bouchouchi
- Assistant coach(es): Stan Huijsmans
- Manager: Jana Ebert
- Captain: Lisa Nolte

Junior World Cup
- Appearances: 11 (first in 1989)
- Best result: (gold) 1st (1989)

EuroHockey Junior Championship
- Appearances: 20 (first in 1977)
- Best result: (gold) 1st (1977, 1979, 1988, 1992, 1996, 1998, 2006, 2008, 2022)
Medal record
Junior World Cup
Gold medal – first place	1989 Ottawa
Silver medal – second place	2005 Santiago
Silver medal – second place	2022 Potchefstroom
Bronze medal – third place	1993 Terrassa
EuroHockey Junior Championship
Gold medal – first place	1977 Vienna
Gold medal – first place	1979 Düsseldorf
Gold medal – first place	1988 Paris
Gold medal – first place	1992 Edinburgh
Gold medal – first place	1996 Cardiff
Gold medal – first place	1998 Belfast
Gold medal – first place	2006 Catania
Gold medal – first place	2008 Valencia
Gold medal – first place	2022 Ghent
Silver medal – second place	1978 Celle
Silver medal – second place	1981 Barcelona
Silver medal – second place	1984 Dundee
Silver medal – second place	2004 Dublin
Silver medal – second place	2014 Waterloo
Bronze medal – third place	2002 Alcalá la Real
Bronze medal – third place	2019 Valencia
Bronze medal – third place	2026 Valencia

The Germany women's national under-21 field hockey team represents Germany in women's international under-21 field hockey competitions; is controlled by the German Hockey Federation, the governing body for field hockey in Germany.

The team competes in the EuroHockey Junior Championships, which they have won nine times. They have qualified for all the Junior World Cups, which they have won once, in 1989.

== Tournament record ==
=== Junior World Cup ===
- 1989 – (gold)
- 1993 – (bronze)
- 1997 – 4th place
- 2001 – 7th place
- 2005 – (silver)
- 2009 – 6th place
- 2013 – 10th place
- 2016 – 5th place
- 2021 – (silver)
- 2023 – 6th place
- 2025 – 5th place
- 2027 – Qualified

=== EuroHockey Junior Championship ===
- 1977 – (gold)
- 1978 – (silver)
- 1979 – (gold)
- 1981 – (silver)
- 1984 – (silver)
- 1988 – (gold)
- 1992 – (gold)
- 1996 – (gold)
- 1998 – (gold)
- 2000 – 4th place
- 2002 – (bronze)
- 2004 – (silver)
- 2006 – (gold)
- 2008 – (gold)
- 2010 – 4th place
- 2012 – 4th place
- 2014 – (silver)
- 2017 – 4th place
- 2019 – (bronze)
- 2022 – (gold)
- 2024 – 4th place
- 2026 – (bronze)

== See also ==
- Germany men's national under-21 field hockey team
- Germany women's national field hockey team
