= England women's national under-21 field hockey team =

Youth field hockey team representing England

England
- Association: England Hockey
- Confederation: EHF (Europe)
- Head Coach: Simon Letchford
- Assistant coach(es): Alistar Addison; Brett Holland
- Manager: Leigh Maasdorp
- Captain: Olivia Hamilton
Home	Away

Junior World Cup
- Appearances: 10 (first in 1989)
- Best result: (bronze) 3rd (2022)

EuroHockey Junior Championship
- Appearances: 19 (first in 1984)
- Best result: (silver) 2nd (1988, 2000, 2002, 2006, 2010)
Medal record
Event	1st	2nd	3rd
Junior World Cup	0	0	1
EuroHockey Junior Championship	0	5	6
Total	0	5	7
Junior World Cup
Bronze medal – third place	2022 Potchefstroom	
EuroHockey Junior Championship
Silver medal – second place	1988 Paris	
Silver medal – second place	2000 Leipzig	
Silver medal – second place	2002 Alcalá la Real	
Silver medal – second place	2006 Catania	
Silver medal – second place	2010 Lille	
Bronze medal – third place	2004 Dublin	
Bronze medal – third place	2008 Valencia	
Bronze medal – third place	2012 's-Hertogenbosch	
Bronze medal – third place	2014 Waterloo	
Bronze medal – third place	2017 Valencia	
Bronze medal – third place	2024 Terrassa	

The England women's national under-21 field hockey team represents England in women's under-21 international field hockey and is controlled by England Hockey, the governing body for field hockey in England.

== Competitive Record ==
=== Junior World Cup ===
- 1989 – 8th place
- 1993 – 9th place
- 1997 – 7th place
- 2001 – 8th place
- 2005 – 9th place
- 2009 – 4th place
- 2013 – 4th place
- 2016 – 7th place
- 2022 – (bronze)
- 2023 – 4th place
- 2025 – 8th place
- 2027 – Qualified

=== EuroHockey Junior Championship ===
- 1984 – 5th
- 1988 – (silver)
- 1992 – 4th
- 1996 – 4th
- 1998 – 5th
- 2000 – (silver)
- 2002 – (silver)
- 2004 – (bronze)
- 2006 – (silver)
- 2008 – (bronze)
- 2010 – (silver)
- 2012 – (bronze)
- 2014 – (bronze)
- 2017 – (bronze)
- 2019 – 6th
- 2022 – 4th
- 2024 – (bronze)
- 2026 – 5th

== See also ==
- England men's national under-21 field hockey team
- England women's national field hockey team
