= Netherlands women's national under-21 field hockey team =

Netherlands
- Nickname(s): Jong Oranje Dames (Young Orange Women)
- Association: Royal Dutch Hockey Federation (Koninlijke Nederlandse Hockey Bond)
- Confederation: EHF (Europe)
- Head Coach: Dave Smolenaars
- Assistant coach(es): Damien van der Peet
- Manager: Leonoor Vriesendorp-Voskamp
- Captain: Luna Fokke

Junior World Cup
- Appearances: 11 (first in 1989)
- Best result: (gold) 1st (1997, 2009, 2013, 2022, 2023, 2025)

EuroHockey Junior Championship
- Appearances: 22 (first in 1977)
- Best result: (gold) 1st (1978, 1981, 1984, 2000, 2002, 2004, 2010, 2012, 2014, 2017, 2024, 2026)
Medal record
Junior World Cup
Gold medal – first place	1997 Seongnam
Gold medal – first place	2009 Boston
Gold medal – first place	2013 Mönchengladbach
Gold medal – first place	2022 Potchefstroom
Gold medal – first place	2023 Santiago
Gold medal – first place	2025 Santiago
Silver medal – second place	2016 Santiago
Bronze medal – third place	2005 Dantiago
EuroHockey Junior Championship
Gold medal – first place	1978 Celle
Gold medal – first place	1981 Barcelona
Gold medal – first place	1984 Dundee
Gold medal – first place	2000 Leipzig
Gold medal – first place	2002 Alcalá la Real
Gold medal – first place	2004 Dublin
Gold medal – first place	2010 Lille
Gold medal – first place	2012 's-Hertogenbosch
Gold medal – first place	2014 Waterloo
Gold medal – first place	2017 Valencia
Gold medal – first place	2024 Terrassa
Gold medal – first place	2026 Terrassa
Silver medal – second place	1977 Vienna
Silver medal – second place	1979 Düssesldorf
Silver medal – second place	1992 Edinburgh
Silver medal – second place	1998 Belfast
Silver medal – second place	2008 Valencia
Silver medal – second place	2019 Valencia
Bronze medal – third place	1988 Paris
Bronze medal – third place	1996 Cardiff
Bronze medal – third place	2022 Ghent

The Netherlands women's national under-21 field hockey team represents the Netherlands in women's international under-21 field hockey and is controlled by the Koninklijke Nederlandse Hockey Bond, the governing body for field hockey in the Netherlands.

The team competes in the EuroHockey Junior Championships which they have won a record twelve times. They also have the most Junior World Cup titles with six.

== Tournament record ==
=== Junior World Cup ===
- 1989 – 4th place
- 1993 – 5th place
- 1997 – (gold)
- 2001 – 4th place
- 2005 – (bronze)
- 2009 – (gold)
- 2013 – (gold)
- 2016 – (silver)
- 2022 – (gold)
- 2023 – (gold)
- 2025 – (gold)
- 2027 – Qualified

=== EuroHockey Junior Championship ===
- 1977 – (silver)
- 1978 – (gold)
- 1979 – (silver)
- 1981 – (gold)
- 1984 – (gold)
- 1988 – (bronze)
- 1992 – (silver)
- 1996 – (bronze)
- 1998 – (silver)
- 2000 – (gold)
- 2002 – (gold)
- 2004 – (gold)
- 2006 – 5th place
- 2008 – (silver)
- 2010 – (gold)
- 2012 – (gold)
- 2014 – (gold)
- 2017 – (gold)
- 2019 – (silver)
- 2022 – (bronze)
- 2024 – (gold)
- 2026 – (gold)

== See also ==
- Netherlands men's national under-21 field hockey team
- Netherlands women's national field hockey team
