= Women's EuroHockey U21 Championship =

International field hockey tournament

- Current season, competition or edition: 2026 Women's EuroHockey U21 Championship
- Formerly: Women's EuroHockey Junior Championship
- Sport: Field hockey
- Founded: 1977; 49 years ago
- First season: 1977
- No. of teams: 8
- Confederation: EHF (Europe)
- Most recent champion: Netherlands (12th title) (2026)
- Most titles: Netherlands (12 titles)
- Level on pyramid: 1
- Relegation to: EuroHockey U21 Championship II

The Women's EuroHockey U21 Championship is a women's international under-21 field hockey tournament organized by the European Hockey Federation. The tournament has been held since 1977 and serves as a qualification tournament for the Women's FIH Hockey Junior World Cup. In June 2023, the tournament was renamed from the Women's EuroHockey Junior Championship to the Women's EuroHockey U21 Championship.

The Women's EuroHockey Junior Championships consists of three levels. There is promotion and relegation between the three levels. The top two placed teams in the Championship II are promoted to the following year's Championship while the two lowest placed teams in the Championship are relegated to the following year's Championship II.

The highest level has been won by three different teams: the Netherlands has the most titles with twelve, Germany has nine titles and Spain won their first and only title at the 2019 edition in Valencia, Spain.

== Championship I ==
=== Results ===
Year	Host	Final			Third place match			Number of teams
Year	Host	Winner	Score	Runner-up	Third place	Score	Fourth place	Number of teams
1977; Details	Vienna, Austria	West Germany		Netherlands	France		Austria	6
1978; Details	Celle, West Germany	Netherlands	Round-robin	West Germany	Spain	Round-robin	Austria	5
1979; Details	Düsseldorf, West Germany	West Germany		Netherlands	Belgium		Spain	5
1981; Details	Barcelona, Spain	Netherlands	2–1	Germany	Spain	1–0	Belgium	8
1984; Details	Dundee, Scotland	Netherlands	2–1	West Germany	Ireland	4–1	Spain	8
1988; Details	Paris, France	West Germany	3–1	England	Netherlands	4–1	Soviet Union	8
1992; Details	Edinburgh, Scotland	Germany	2–1	Netherlands	Spain	3–1	England	8
1996; Details	Cardiff, Wales	Germany	2–2 (a.e.t.) (6–5 p.s.)	Ukraine	Netherlands	3–0	England	8
1998; Details	Belfast, Northern Ireland	Germany	4–2	Netherlands	Ukraine	4–3	Spain	8
2000; Details	Leipzig, Germany	Netherlands	3–0	England	Ukraine	4–2	Germany	8
2002; Details	Alcalá la Real, Spain	Netherlands	2–1	England	Germany	2–0	Scotland	8
2004; Details	Dublin, Ireland	Netherlands	1–1 (6–5 pen.)	Germany	England	5–1	Scotland	8
2006; Details	Catania, Italy	Germany	1–0	England	Italy	1–1 (3–2 pen.)	Spain	8
2008; Details	Valencia, Spain	Germany	2–1	Netherlands	England	5–2	Belarus	8
2010; Details	Lille, France	Netherlands	4–1	England	Spain	2–1	Germany	8
2012; Details	's-Hertogenbosch, Netherlands	Netherlands	9–1	Spain	England	3–2	Germany	8
2014; Details	Waterloo, Belgium	Netherlands	2–0	Germany	England	2–0	Spain	8
2017; Details	Valencia, Spain	Netherlands	6–0	Belgium	England	3–2	Germany	7
2019; Details	Valencia, Spain	Spain	1–1 (4–3 s.o.)	Netherlands	Germany	1–1 (3–2 s.o.)	Belgium	9
2022; Details	Ghent, Belgium	Germany	1–1 (4–3 s.o.)	Belgium	Netherlands	2–1	England	8
2024; Details	Terrassa, Spain	Netherlands	5–3	Spain	England	1–0	Germany	8
2026; Details	Valencia, Spain	Netherlands	2–1	Spain	Germany	3–0	Belgium	8

=== Summary ===
Team	Titles	Runners-up	Third places	Fourth places
Netherlands	12 (1978, 1981, 1984, 2000, 2002, 2004, 2010, 2012*, 2014, 2017, 2024, 2026)	6 (1977, 1979, 1992, 1998, 2008, 2019)	3 (1988, 1996, 2022)	
Germany (Note: Includes results representing West Germany between 1976 and 1988)	9 (1977, 1979*, 1988, 1992, 1996, 1998, 2006, 2008, 2022)	5 (1978*, 1981, 1984, 2004, 2014)	3 (2002, 2019, 2026)	5 (2000*, 2010, 2012, 2017, 2024)
Spain	1 (2019*)	3 (2012, 2024, 2026*)	4 (1978, 1981*, 1992, 2010)	5 (1979, 1984, 1998, 2006, 2014)
England		5 (1988, 2000, 2002, 2006, 2010)	6 (2004, 2008, 2012, 2014, 2017, 2024)	3 (1992, 1996, 2022)
Belgium		2 (2017, 2022*)	1 (1979)	3 (1981, 2019, 2026)
Ukraine		1 (1996)	2 (1998, 2000)	
France			1 (1977)	
Ireland			1 (1984)	
Italy			1 (2006*)	
Austria				2 (1977*, 1978)
Scotland				2 (2002, 2004*)
Soviet Union				1 (1988)
Belarus				1 (2008)

* = hosts

=== Team appearances ===
Team	(Austria) 1977	(West Germany) 1978	(West Germany) 1979	(Spain) 1981	(Scotland) 1984	(France) 1988	(Scotland) 1992	(Wales) 1996	(Ireland) 1998	(Germany) 2000	(Spain) 2002	(Ireland) 2004	(Italy) 2006	(Spain) 2008	(France) 2010	(Netherlands) 2012	(Belgium) 2014	(Spain) 2017	(Spain) 2019	(Belgium) 2022	(Spain) 2024	(Spain) 2026	Total
Austria	4th	4th	–	6th	8th	–	–	–	–	–	–	–	–	–	–	–	–	–	–	–	8th	–	5
Belarus	Part of the Soviet Union							–	8th	–	6th	6th	6th	4th	5th	8th	–	–	9th	–	–	–	8
Belgium	–	–	3rd	4th	6th	–	–	–	–	–	–	–	–	7th	–	5th	5th	2nd	4th	2nd	5th	4th	11
Czech Republic	Part of Czechoslovakia						–	6th	6th	–	–	–	–	–	–	–	7th	–	–	–	–	–	3
England	–	–	–	–	5th	2nd	4th	4th	5th	2nd	2nd	3rd	2nd	3rd	2nd	3rd	3rd	3rd	6th	4th	3rd	5th	18
France	3rd	5th	5th	5th	–	8th	8th	–	–	8th	–	8th	–	–	6th	6th	6th	5th	8th	–	7th	–	14
Germany	1st	2nd	1st	2nd	2nd	1st	1st	1st	1st	4th	3rd	2nd	1st	1st	4th	4th	2nd	4th	3rd	1st	4th	3rd	22
Ireland	–	–	–	–	3rd	7th	6th	–	7th	–	–	7th	–	–	–	–	–	5th	7th	6th	6th	7th	10
Italy	5th	–	–	8th	–	–	–	–	–	–	–	–	3rd	8th	–	–	–	–	–	–	–	–	4
Lithuania	Part of the Soviet Union							–	–	–	8th	–	–	6th	7th	–	–	–	–	–	–	–	3
Netherlands	2nd	1st	2nd	1st	1st	3rd	2nd	3rd	2nd	1st	1st	1st	5th	2nd	1st	1st	1st	1st	2nd	3rd	1st	1st	22
Poland	–	–	–	–	–	–	–	–	–	–	–	–	–	–	–	7th	–	–	–	–	–	–	1
Russia	Part of the Soviet Union							7th	–	6th	–	–	–	–	–	–	8th	–	5th	DSQ	–	–	4
Scotland	–	–	–	–	7th	6th	5th	–	–	–	4th	4th	8th	–	8th	–	–	–	–	8th	–	6th	9
Soviet Union	–	–	–	–	–	4th	7th	Defunct															2
Spain	6th	3rd	4th	3rd	4th	5th	3rd	5th	4th	5th	5th	5th	4th	5th	3rd	2nd	4th	5th	1st	5th	2nd	2nd	22
Switzerland	–	–	–	7th	–	–	–	–	–	–	–	–	–	–	–	–	–	–	–	–	–	–	1
Ukraine	Part of the Soviet Union							2nd	3rd	3rd	7th	–	–	–	–	–	–	–	–	–	–	–	4
Wales	–	–	–	–	–	–	–	8th	–	7th	–	–	7th	–	–	–	–	–	–	7th	–	8th	5
Total	6	5	5	8	8	8	8	8	8	8	8	8	8	8	8	8	8	7	9	8	8	8	

== Championship II ==
=== Results ===
Year	Host	Final			Third place match			Number of teams
Year	Host	Winner	Score	Runner-up	Third place	Score	Fourth place	Number of teams
1998; Details	Bratislava, Slovakia	France		Wales	Russia		Poland	8
2000; Details	Prague, Czech Republic	Scotland		Belarus	Lithuania		Czech Republic	8
2003; Details	Prague, Czech Republic	France		Ireland	Italy		Russia	8
2004; Details	Swansea, Wales	Wales		Italy	Ukraine		Lithuania	8
2006; Details	Vilnius, Lithuania	Lithuania		Belgium	Russia		Poland	8
2008; Details	Prague, Czech Republic	France		Scotland	Ukraine		Poland	7
2010; Details	Bra, Italy	Belgium		Poland	Russia		Ukraine	10
2012; Details	Aleksin, Russia	Russia	Round-robin	Czech Republic	Scotland	Round-robin	Lithuania	6
2014; Details	Vienna, Austria	Italy	Round-robin	Ireland	Ukraine	Round-robin	Scotland	9
2017; Details	Hradec Králové, Czech Republic	Russia	3–0	Belarus	Czech Republic	3–2	Austria	8
2019; Details	Alanya, Turkey	Scotland	4–1	Italy	Wales	3–1	Ukraine	8
2022; Details	Vienna, Austria	Austria	Round-robin	France	Poland	Round-robin	Italy	6
2024; Details	Rakovník, Czech Republic	Wales	3–2	Czech Republic	Italy	7–0	Lithuania	4
2024; Details	Konya, Turkey	Scotland	1–0	Ukraine	Poland	4–1	Turkey	4
2026; Details	Salon-de-Provence, France	France	5–0	Italy	Ukraine	2–1	Lithuania	4
2026; Details	Vienna, Austria	Czech Republic	Round-robin	Poland	Austria	Round-robin	Turkey	5

=== Summary ===
Team	Winners	Runners-up	Third place	Fourth place
France	4 (1998, 2003, 2008, 2026 A*)	1 (2022)		
Scotland	3 (2000, 2019, 2024 B)	1 (2008)	1 (2012)	1 (2014)
Wales	2 (2004*, 2024 A)	1 (1998)	1 (2019)	
Russia	2 (2012*, 2017)		3 (1998, 2006, 2010)	1 (2003)
Italy	1 (2014)	3 (2004, 2019, 2026 A)	2 (2003, 2024 A)	1 (2022)
Czech Republic	1 (2026 B)	2 (2012, 2024 A*)	1 (2017*)	1 (2000*)
Belgium	1 (2010)	1 (2006)		
Lithuania	1 (2006*)		1 (2000)	3 (2004, 2012, 2024 A)
Austria	1 (2022*)		1 (2026 B*)	1 (2017)
Poland		2 (2010, 2026 B)	2 (2022, 2024 B)	3 (1998, 2006, 2008)
Belarus		2 (2000, 2017)		
Ireland		2 (2003, 2014)		
Ukraine		1 (2024 B)	4 (2004, 2008, 2014, 2026 A)	2 (2010, 2019)
Turkey				2 (2024 B*, 2026 B)
Lithuania				1 (2026 A)

* = hosts

=== Team appearances ===
Team	(Slovakia) 1998	(Czech Republic) 2000	(Czech Republic) 2003	(Wales) 2004	(Lithuania) 2006	(Czech Republic) 2008	(Italy) 2010	(Russia) 2012	(Austria) 2014	(Czech Republic) 2017	(Turkey) 2019	(Austria) 2022	(Czech Republic) (Turkey) 2024	(France) (Austria) 2026	Total
Austria	–	–	8th	–	–	–	8th	6th	7th	4th	7th	1st	–	3rd	8
Azerbaijan	–	8th	–	–	8th	–	9th	–	–	–	–	–	–	–	3
Belarus	–	2nd	–	–	–	–	–	–	6th	2nd	–	DSQ	–	–	4
Belgium	–	6th	–	–	2nd	–	1st	–	–	–	–	–	–	–	3
Croatia	–	–	–	–	–	–	–	–	–	–	–	–	–	–	1
Czech Republic	–	4th	7th	8th	–	5th	6th	2nd	–	3rd	5th	5th	2nd	1st	11
France	1st	–	1st	–	5th	1st	–	–	–	–	–	2nd	–	1st	6
Ireland	–	5th	2nd	–	–	–	–	–	2nd	–	–	–	–	–	4
Italy	7th	–	3rd	2nd	–	–	5th	–	1st	–	2nd	4th	3rd	2nd	9
Lithuania	5th	3rd	–	4th	1st	–	–	4th	9th	–	–	–	4th	4th	8
Luxembourg	–	–	–	–	–	–	–	–	–	–	–	–	–	–	1
Poland	4th	7th	–	5th	4th	4th	2nd	–	5th	8th	6th	3rd	3rd	2nd	12
Russia	3rd	–	4th	7th	3rd	7th	3rd	1st	–	1st	–	–	–	–	8
Scotland	6th	1st	–	–	–	2nd	–	3rd	4th	5th	1st	–	1st	–	8
Slovakia	8th	–	–	–	–	–	10th	–	–	–	–	–	–	–	2
Switzerland	–	–	6th	6th	7th	–	–	–	–	–	–	–	–	5th	4
Turkey	–	–	–	–	–	–	–	–	8th	7th	8th	–	4th	4th	5
Ukraine	–	–	–	3rd	6th	3rd	4th	5th	3rd	6th	4th	6th	2nd	3rd	11
Wales	2nd	–	5th	1st	–	6th	7th	–	–	–	3rd	–	1st	–	7
Total	8	8	8	8	8	7	10	6	9	8	8	6	8	9	

== Championship III ==
=== Results ===
Year	Host	Final			Third place match			Number of teams
Year	Host	Winner	Score	Runner-up	Third place	Score	Fourth place	Number of teams
2000; Details	Catania, Italy	Italy		Austria	Switzerland		Greece	4
2002; Details	Poznań, Poland	Poland		Azerbaijan	Croatia		Greece	4
2004; Details	Predanovci, Slovenia	Croatia		Slovenia	Belgium		Azerbaijan	6
2006; Details	Albena, Bulgaria	Czech Republic		Croatia	Slovakia		Austria	6
2008; Details	Vienna, Austria	Azerbaijan		Austria	Slovakia		Turkey	4
2012; Details	Lisbon, Portugal	Ireland	8–0	Turkey	Azerbaijan	4–0	Portugal	4
2022; Details	Alanya, Turkey	Turkey	2–0	Lithuania	Switzerland	Only three teams		3

=== Summary ===
Team	Winners	Runners-up	Third place	Fourth place
Azerbaijan	1 (2008)	1 (2002)	1 (2012)	1 (2004)
Croatia	1 (2004)	1 (2006)	1 (2002)	
Turkey	1 (2022*)	1 (2012)		1 (2008)
Czech Republic	1 (2006)			
Ireland	1 (2012)			
Italy	1 (2000*)			
Poland	1 (2002*)			
Austria		2 (2000, 2008*)		1 (2006)
Slovenia		1 (2004*)		
Lithuania		1 (2022)		
Switzerland			2 (2000, 2022)	
Slovakia			2 (2006, 2008)	
Belgium			1 (2004)	
Greece				2 (2000, 2002)
Portugal				1 (2012*)

* = hosts

=== Team appearances ===
Team	(Italy) 2000	(Poland) 2002	(Slovenia) 2004	(Bulgaria) 2006	(Austria) 2008	(Portugal) 2012	(Turkey) 2022	Total
Austria	2nd	–	5th	4th	2nd	–	–	4
Azerbaijan	–	2nd	4th	–	1st	3rd	–	4
Belgium	–	–	3rd	–	–	–	–	1
Bulgaria	–	–	6th	5th	–	–	–	2
Croatia	–	3rd	1st	2nd	–	–	–	3
Czech Republic	–	–	–	1st	–	–	–	1
Greece	4th	4th	–	–	–	–	–	2
Ireland	–	–	–	–	–	1st	–	1
Italy	1st	–	–	–	–	–	–	1
Lithuania	–	–	–	–	–	–	2nd	1
Poland	–	1st	–	–	–	–	–	1
Portugal	–	–	–	–	—	4th	–	1
Slovakia	–	–	–	3rd	3rd	–	–	2
Slovenia	–	–	2nd	–	–	–	–	1
Switzerland	3rd	–	–	–	–	–	3rd	2
Turkey	–	–	–	6th	4th	2nd	1st	5
Total	4	4	6	6	4	4	3	

== See also ==
- Girls' EuroHockey U18 Championship
- Men's EuroHockey U21 Championship
- Women's EuroHockey Championship
