= Women's FIH Hockey Junior World Cup =

International women's field hockey tournament

- Upcoming season or competition: 2027 Women's FIH Hockey Junior World Cup
- Sport: Field hockey
- Founded: 1989; 37 years ago
- First season: 1989
- No. of teams: 24
- Confederation: International Hockey Federation
- Most recent champion: Netherlands (6th title) (2025)
- Most titles: Netherlands (6 titles)
- Qualification: Continental championships

The Women's FIH Hockey Junior World Cup, formerly known as the Women's Hockey Junior World Cup, is the field hockey Junior World Cup competition for women. The format for qualification and the final tournament is similar to the men's.

It is organized by the International Hockey Federation and has been played since 1989. The tournament features players who are under 21 years of age and is held once every two years.

Four teams have dominated in past events. Netherlands is the most successful team, having won the tournament six times, followed by Korea and Argentina. Germany have won the tournament once.

In response to the 2022 Russian invasion of Ukraine, the FIH banned Russia from the 2022 Women's FIH Hockey Junior World Cup, and banned Russian and Belarusian officials from FIH events.

== Results ==
=== Summaries ===
#	Year	Host	Final			Third place match			Teams
#	Year	Host	Winner	Score	Runner-up	Third place	Score	Fourth place	Teams
1	1989; Details	Ottawa, Canada	West Germany	2–0	South Korea	Soviet Union	4–3	Netherlands	12
2	1993; Details	Terrassa, Spain	Argentina	2–1	Australia	Germany	2–2 (a.e.t.) (3–2 p.s.)	South Korea	12
3	1997; Details	Seongnam, South Korea	Netherlands	2–0	Australia	Argentina	3–1	Germany	12
4	2001; Details	Buenos Aires, Argentina	South Korea	2–2 (a.e.t.) (4–3 p.s.)	Argentina	Australia	2–0	Netherlands	15
5	2005; Details	Santiago, Chile	South Korea	1–0	Germany	Netherlands	2–1	Australia	16
6	2009; Details	Boston, United States	Netherlands	3–0	Argentina	South Korea	2–1	England	16
7	2013; Details	Mönchengladbach, Germany	Netherlands	1–1 (4–2 s.o.)	Argentina	India	1–1 (3–2 s.o.)	England	16
8	2016; Details	Santiago, Chile	Argentina	4–2	Netherlands	Australia	1–1 (3–1 s.o.)	Spain	16
9	2022; Details	Potchefstroom, South Africa	Netherlands	3–1	Germany	England	2–2 (3–0 s.o.)	India	15
10	2023; Details	Santiago, Chile	Netherlands	2–2 (4–1 s.o.)	Argentina	Belgium	7–0	England	16
11	2025; Details	Santiago, Chile	Netherlands	2–1	Argentina	Belgium	5–1	China	24
12	2027; Details								24

== Performance by nations ==
Team	Titles	Runners-up	Third place	Fourth place
Netherlands	6 (1997, 2009, 2013, 2022, 2023, 2025)	1 (2016)	1 (2005)	2 (1989, 2001)
Argentina	2 (1993, 2016)	5 (2001*, 2009, 2013, 2023, 2025)	1 (1997)	
South Korea	2 (2001, 2005)	1 (1989)	1 (2009)	1 (1993)
Germany^	1 (1989)	2 (2005, 2022)	1 (1993)	1 (1997)
Australia		2 (1993, 1997)	2 (2001, 2016)	1 (2005)
Belgium			2 (2023, 2025)	
England			1 (2022)	3 (2009, 2013, 2023)
India			1 (2013)	1 (2022)
Soviet Union#			1 (1989)	
Spain				1 (2016)
China				1 (2025)

* = hosts
^ = includes result representing West Germany in 1989
# = states that have since split into two or more independent nations

=== Team appearances ===
Team	(Canada) 1989	(Spain) 1993	(South Korea) 1997	(Argentina) 2001	(Chile) 2005	(United States) 2009	(Germany) 2013	(Chile) 2016	(South Africa) 2022	(Chile) 2023	(Chile) 2025	(To be determined) 2027	Total
Argentina	6th	1st	3rd	2nd	5th	2nd	2nd	1st	5th	2nd	2nd	Q	12
Australia	–	2nd	2nd	3rd	4th	5th	6th	3rd	WD	5th	7th	Q	10
Austria	–	–	–	–	–	–	–	–	10th	–	21st	–	2
Belarus	–	–	–	–	14th	15th	–	–	–	–	–	–	2
Belgium	–	–	–	–	–	–	13th	6th	WD	3rd	3rd	Q	5
Canada	7th	8th	11th	13th	15th	–	14th	–	15th	16th	20th	Q	10
Chile	11th	–	–	12th	10th	12th	–	11th	–	12th	18th	Q	8
China	5th	6th	8th	–	13th	7th	12th	10th	WD	–	4th	Q	9
Czechia	–	–	–	–	–	–	–	–	–	–	–	Q	1
England	8th	9th	7th	8th	9th	4th	4th	7th	3rd	4th	8th	Q	12
France	–	–	–	–	–	14th	–	15th	–	–	–	Q	3
Germany^	1st	3rd	4th	7th	2nd	6th	10th	5th	2nd	6th	5th	Q	12
Ghana	–	–	–	–	–	–	16th	–	–	–	–		1
India	–	–	–	9th	11th	9th	3rd	–	4th	9th	9th	Q	8
Ireland	–	–	–	–	–	–	–	–	9th	–	13th	Q	3
Japan	–	–	–	–	–	–	–	9th	WD	7th	11th	Q	4
Kenya	–	10th	–	–	–	–	–	–	–	–	–		1
Lithuania	–	–	–	–	–	16th	–	–	–	–	–	–	1
Malaysia	–	–	–	–	–	–	–	–	11th	–	22nd	–	2
Namibia	–	–	–	–	–	–	–	–	–	–	24th		1
Netherlands	4th	5th	1st	4th	3rd	1st	1st	2nd	1st	1st	1st	Q	12
New Zealand	9th	–	–	5th	–	10th	9th	13th	WD	15th	19th	Q	8
Russia	–	–	–	15th	–	–	15th	–	DSQ	–	–	–	2
Scotland	–	11th	–	–	12th	–	–	–	–	–	17th	Q	4
South Africa	–	–	6th	6th	8th	11th	8th	14th	7th	13th	15th		9
South Korea	2nd	4th	5th	1st	1st	3rd	11th	12th	6th	11th	16th	Q	12
Soviet Union#	3rd	Defunct											1
Spain	–	7th	9th	10th	6th	13th	5th	4th	WD	8th	9th	Q	10
Trinidad and Tobago	–	12th	–	–	–	–	–	–	–	–	–	–	1
Ukraine	–	–	10th	–	–	–	–	–	WD	–	–	–	1
United States	10th	–	12th	14th	7th	8th	7th	8th	8th	10th	6th	Q	11
Uruguay	–	–	–	–	–	–	–	–	13th	–	12th	Q	3
Wales	–	–	–	11th	–	–	–	–	14th	–	14th	–	3
Zimbabwe	12th	–	–	–	16th	–	–	16th	12th	14th	23rd		6
Total (33)	12	12	12	15	16	16	16	16	15	16	24	24	

^ = includes result representing West Germany in 1989
# = states that have since split into two or more independent nations

Argentina, Korea, Germany, and Netherlands are the only teams to have competed at each Junior World Cup; 31 teams have competed in at least one Junior World Cup.

=== Debut of teams ===
Year	Debuting teams			Successor and renamed teams
Year	Teams	No.	CT	Successor and renamed teams
1989	Argentina, Canada, Chile, China, England, West Germany, Netherlands, New Zealand, South Korea, Soviet Union, United States, Zimbabwe	12	12	
1993	Australia, Kenya, Scotland, Spain, Trinidad and Tobago	5	17	Germany
1997	South Africa, Ukraine	2	19	
2001	India, Russia, Wales	3	22	
2005	Belarus	1	23	
2009	France, Lithuania	2	25	
2013	Belgium, Ghana	2	27	
2016	Japan	1	28	
2022	Austria, Ireland, Malaysia, Uruguay	4	32	
2025	Namibia	1	33	
2027	Czechia	1	34	

== See also ==
- Field hockey at the Summer Olympics
- Men's FIH Hockey World Cup
- Men's FIH Hockey Junior World Cup
- Men's FIH Indoor Hockey World Cup
- Women's FIH Indoor Hockey World Cup
- Women's FIH Hockey World Cup
- FIH Para Hockey World Cup
