= Bangladesh women's national under-21 field hockey team =

Bangladesh
- Association: Bangladesh Hockey Federation (BHF)
- Confederation: Asian Hockey Federation (AHF)
- Head Coach: Jahid Hossain
- Captain: Mohua

FIH ranking
- Current: 85 (3 October 2026)

First international
- Bangladesh 0–3 Singapore (Singapore City, Singapore; 9 September 2019)

Biggest win
- Bangladesh 10–1 Indonesia (Singapore City, Singapore; 22 June 2024)

Biggest defeat
- Bangladesh 0–19 China (Muscat, Oman; 7 December 2024)

Junior World Cup
- Appearances: DNQ

Junior Asia Cup
- Appearances: 2 (first in 2024)
- Best result: 5th (2026)
Medal record
Women's Junior AHF Cup
Gold medal – first place	2026 Muscat
Silver medal – second place	2024 Singapore

The Bangladesh women's national under-21 field hockey team represents Bangladesh in women's international field hockey competitions and it's controlled by the Bangladesh Hockey Federation (BHF), which is currently a member of the Asian Hockey Federation (AHF) and the International Hockey Federation (FIH). The team have participates Women's Junior AHF Cup.

== History ==
The Bangladesh women's national under-21 field hockey team represents Bangladesh in the field hockey various tournament. The team have played their debut game on 9 September 2019 against Singapore which lost by 3–0 goals at Sengkang Sports Centre, Singapore City, Singapore. They yet to qualify to the Women's FIH Hockey Junior World Cup. They finished second in the 2024 Junior AHF Cup and qualified to the Junior Asia Cup for the first time. Bangladesh finished 9th in the 2024 Junior Asia Cup after securing their first victory in the tournament against Sri Lanka. Bangladesh won their first ever international title after becoming Champions of the 2026 Junior AHF Cup.

== Home stadium ==
The Bangladesh women's national under-21 field hockey team played their home games at Maulana Bhasani Hockey Stadium, Dhaka Bangladesh.

== Current squad ==
The following squad were name for the most recent 2024 Women's Junior AHF Cup.

As of 19 June 2024

Jersey No	Name	Position	Most Recent Call-up
1	Mohua	GK/Captain	2024 Women's Junior AHF Cup
2	Neeladri Neel	FW	2024 Women's Junior AHF Cup
3	Mst Rani Moni Riya	DF	2024 Women's Junior AHF Cup
4	Mst Anika	DF	2024 Women's Junior AHF Cup
5	Ninisen Rakhain	DF	2024 Women's Junior AHF Cup
6	Sanjida Moni	FW	2024 Women's Junior AHF Cup
7	Sumaya Shimo	FW	2024 Women's Junior AHF Cup
8	Riyasha Rishi	FW	2024 Women's Junior AHF Cup
9	Sonia Khatun	FW	2024 Women's Junior AHF Cup
10	Orpita Pal	MF	2024 Women's Junior AHF Cup
11	Sharika Rimon	MF	2024 Women's Junior AHF Cup
12	Airin Riya	MF	2024 Women's Junior AHF Cup
14	Mst Lima	DF	2024 Women's Junior AHF Cup
15	Kona Akter	DF	2024 Women's Junior AHF Cup
16	Nadira Ema	FW	2024 Women's Junior AHF Cup
17	Fatema Tuzzohora	FW	2024 Women's Junior AHF Cup
18	Heemadri Sukh	MF	2024 Women's Junior AHF Cup
19	Mst Khatun	GK	2024 Women's Junior AHF Cup

== Results and fixtures ==
Legend

Win Draw Lose Fixture

=== 2019 ===
9 September 2019 2024 Women's Junior AHF Cup	Singapore	3–0	Bangladesh	Singapore City, Singapore
18:00 BST (UTC+6)		Report		Stadium: Sengkang Sports Centre

10 September 2019 2024 Women's Junior AHF Cup	Bangladesh	2–0	Sri Lanka	Singapore City, Singapore
16:00 BST (UTC+6)		Report		Stadium: Sengkang Sports Centre

12 September 2019 2024 Women's Junior AHF Cup	Bangladesh	0–1	Hong Kong	Singapore City, Singapore
16:30 BST (UTC+6)		Report		Stadium: Sengkang Sports Centre

14 September 2019 2024 Women's Junior AHF Cup	Uzbekistan	6–0	Bangladesh	Singapore City, Singapore
14:30 BST (UTC+6)		Report		Stadium: Sengkang Sports Centre

15 September 2019 2019 Women's Junior AHF Cup	Chinese Taipei	4–2	Bangladesh	Singapore City, Singapore
14:00 BST (UTC+6)		Report		Stadium: Sengkang Sports Centre

=== 2024 ===
15 June 2024 2024 Junior AHF Cup Round-robin	Thailand	4–5	Bangladesh	Singapore City, Singapore
7:30 BST (UTC+6)	Trinetr Jirapitisatja 3'; Sawita Kakkaeo 19'; Kawintida Wisuttiprapa 29'; Sudarat Keaw-Noo 42'	Report	Nadira Ema 6'; Orpita Pal 7', 43'; Fatema Tuzzohora 15'; Kona Akter 53'	Stadium: Sengkang Sports Centre

16 June 2024 2024 Junior AHF Cup Round-robin	Hong Kong	1–2	Bangladesh	Singapore City, Singapore
17:30 BST (UTC+6)	Yau Hui Wong 13'	Report	Airin Riya 29'; Kona Akter 52'	Stadium: Sengkang Sports Centre

18 June 2024 2024 Junior AHF Cup Round-robin	Bangladesh	7–2	Sri Lanka	Singapore City, Singapore
16:00 BST (UTC+6)	Airin Riya 2'; Nadira Ema 19'; Orpita Pal 24', 25', 28', 32'; Sonia Khatun 29'	Report	Dilhani Rajapaksha 4', 4'	Stadium: Sengkang Sports Centre

19 June 2024 2024 Junior AHF Cup Round-robin	Chinese Taipei	3–0	Bangladesh	Singapore City, Singapore
15:30 BST (UTC+6)	Yi-Chun Huang 23', 35', 45'	Report		Stadium: Sengkang Sports Centre

22 June 2024 2024 Junior AHF Cup Round-robin	Indonesia	1–10	Bangladesh	Singapore City, Singapore
7:00 BST (UTC+6)	Innes Adiya 38'	Report	Nadira Ema 1'; Airin Riya 15', 59'; Kona Akter 27', 35'; Orpita Pal 30', 37', 46'; Sanjida Moni 48'; Mst Lima 60'	Stadium: Sengkang Sports Centre

23 June 2024 2024 Junior AHF Cup Round-robin	Singapore	1–7	Bangladesh	Singapore City, Singapore
14:30 BST (UTC+6)	Lana Saiful 45'	Report	Sanjida Mono 7'; Kona Akter 7'; Airin Riya 21'; Nadira Ema 25', 33'; Sonia Khatun 39'; Orpita Pal 55'	Stadium: Sengkang Sports Centre

7 December 2024 2024 Junior Asia Cup Pool A	China	19–0	Bangladesh	Muscat, Oman
14:15 BST (UTC+6)	Tan J. 2'; Wang L. 4', 25', 26', 47'; Ma Xi. 5'; Liang W. 7', 39'; Hao G. 9', 26', 33', 41', 55'; Liu T. 10'; Zou L. 29', 34'; Li J. 53'; Lei J. 54'; Zeng Xu. 59'	Report		Stadium: Hockey Oman Stadium

8 December 2024 2024 Junior Asia Cup Pool A	India	13–1	Bangladesh	Muscat, Oman
21:00 BST (UTC+6)	Deepika 7', 20', 55'; Manisha 10'; Kanika 12', 51', 51'; Mumtaz 27', 32', 53', 58'; Beauty 33'; Sakshi 43'	Report	Pal 12'	Stadium: Hockey Oman Stadium

10 December 2024 2024 Junior Asia Cup Pool A	Thailand	2–1	Bangladesh	Muscat, Oman
21:00 BST (UTC+6)	Noo-Keaw 3', 31'	Report	Ema 12'	Stadium: Hockey Oman Stadium

11 December 2024 2024 Junior Asia Cup Pool A	Bangladesh	1–6	Malaysia	Muscat, Oman
18:45 BST (UTC+6)	Pal 49'	Report	Alyani 8', 30', 41'; Adawiyah 44'; Azureen 45'; Syakirah 53'	Stadium: Hockey Oman Stadium

14 December 2024 2024 Junior Asia Cup 9th place match	Bangladesh	8–0	Sri Lanka	Muscat, Oman
11:00 BST (UTC+6)	Tuzzohora 8'; Riya 23', 28', 31', 49'; Pal 44'; Ema 53'; Khatun 57'	Report		Stadium: Hockey Oman Stadium

=== 2026 ===
12 July 2026 2024 Junior AHF Cup Round-robin	Bangladesh	6–0	Hong Kong	Muscat, Oman
20:00 BST (UTC+6)	Riya 9', 54'; Ema 26', 33'; Rimon 28'; Akter 55'	Report

13 July 2026 2024 Junior AHF Cup Round-robin	Bangladesh	1–0	Uzbekistan	Muscat, Oman
22:00 BST (UTC+6)	Ema 50'	Report

16 July 2026 2024 Junior AHF Cup Round-robin	Pakistan	0–8	Bangladesh	Muscat, Oman
20:00 BST (UTC+6)		Report	Rimon 4'; Oishi 15'; Ema 22', 39', 45'; Akter 26'; Riya 38'; Tisha 41'

17 July 2026 2024 Junior AHF Cup Round-robin	Kazakhstan	1–2	Bangladesh	Muscat, Oman
22:00 BST (UTC+6)	Bektemissova 55'	Report	Rimon 16'; Riya 40'

18 July 2026 2024 Junior AHF Cup Final	Bangladesh	2–0	Kazakhstan	Muscat, Oman
22:15 BST (UTC+6)	Riya 15'; Ema 19'	Report

5 September 2026 2026 Junior Asia Cup Challenger Pool	Bangladesh	7–0	Chinese Taipei	Moqi, China
09:00 BST (UTC+6)	Akter 20'; Ema 32', 34'; Riya 35', 38'; Rimon 51', 57'	Report		Stadium: Moqi Training Base

6 September 2026 2026 Junior Asia Cup Challenger Pool	Pakistan	1–5	Bangladesh	Moqi, China
15:00 BST (UTC+6)	Shariqa 41'	Report	Nupur 9'; Ema 19'; Rimon 33'; Akter 43'; Riya 57'	Stadium: Moqi Training Base

8 September 2026 2026 Junior Asia Cup Challenger Pool	Bangladesh	4–0	Kazakhstan	Moqi, China
07:00 BST (UTC+6)	Rimon 3', 51'; M. Akter 14'; Lima 46'	Report		Stadium: Moqi Training Base

9 September 2026 2026 Junior Asia Cup Challenger Pool	Bangladesh	6–0	Hong Kong	Moqi, China
07:00 BST (UTC+6)	Rimon 9'; Riya 19', 33'; K. Akter 26'; Lima 31', 48'	Report		Stadium: Moqi Training Base

10 September 2026 2026 Junior Asia Cup Quarter-finals	Japan	2–0	Bangladesh	Moqi, China
14:45 BST (UTC+6)	Hirai 26'; Suzuki 47'	Report		Stadium: Moqi Training Base

12 September 2026 2026 Junior Asia Cup Fifth place match	Bangladesh	2–1	Malaysia	Moqi, China
08:00 BST (UTC+6)	Rimon 31'; K. Akter 50'	Report	Jeffrey 59'	Stadium: Moqi Training Base

== Competitive records ==
=== Women's Junior Hockey World Cup ===
Women's Junior Hockey World Cup records
Year	Round	Position	GP	W	D	L	GS	GA
(Canada) 1989	Did not qualify							
(Spain) 1994	Did not qualify							
(South Korea) 1997	Did not qualify							
(Argentina) 2001	Did not qualify							
(Chile) 2005	Did not qualify							
(United States) 2009	Did not qualify							
(Germany) 2013	Did not qualify							
(Chile) 2016	Did not qualify							
(South Africa) 2022	Did not qualify							
(Chile) 2023	Did not qualify							
(Chile) 2025	Did not qualify							
2027	TBD							
Total	Best results	0/11	0	0	0	0	0	0

=== Women's Hockey Junior Asia Cup ===
Women's Hockey Junior Asia Cup records
Year	Round	Position	GP	W	D	L	GS	GA
(Malaysia) 1992	Did not participate							
(Japan) 1996	Did not participate							
(Malaysia) 2000	Did not participate							
(India) 2004	Did not participate							
(Malaysia) 2008	Did not participate							
(Thailand) 2012	Did not participate							
(China) 2015	Did not participate							
(Japan) 2021	Did not participate							
(Japan) 2023	Did not participate							
(Oman) 2024	Group stage	9th	5	1	0	4	11	40
(China) 2026	Quarter-finals	5th	6	5	0	1	24	4
Total	Best results	5/10	11	6	0	5	35	44

=== Women's Junior AHF Cup ===
Women's Junior AHF Cup records
Year	Round	Position	GP	W	D	L	GS	GA
(Singapore) 2004	Did not participate							
(Malaysia) 2007	Did not participate							
(Thailand) 2011	Did not participate							
(Hong Kong) 2014	Did not participate							
(Singapore) 2019	Round-robin	5/6	5	1	0	4	4	14
(Kazakhstan) 2022	Did not participate							
(Singapore) 2024	Round-robin	2/7	6	5	0	1	31	12
(Oman) 2026	Final	1/5	5	5	0	0	19	1
Total	Best results: 1st	1/5	16	11	0	5	54	27

== Head-to-head record ==
The match record against all nations, updated to 12 September 2026, is as follows.

Against	Region	P	W	D	L	GF	GA	GD	%Win
China	AHF	1	0	0	1	0	19	−19	0.00
Chinese Taipei	AHF	3	1	0	2	9	7	+2	33.33
Hong Kong	AHF	4	3	0	1	14	2	+12	75.00
India	AHF	1	0	0	1	1	13	−12	0.00
Indonesia	AHF	1	1	0	0	10	1	+9	100.00
Japan	AHF	1	0	0	1	0	2	−2	0.00
Kazakhstan	AHF	3	3	0	0	8	1	+7	100.00
Malaysia	AHF	2	1	0	1	3	7	−4	50.00
Pakistan	AHF	2	2	0	0	13	1	+12	100.00
Singapore	AHF	2	1	0	1	7	4	+3	50.00
Sri Lanka	AHF	3	3	0	0	17	2	+15	100.00
Thailand	AHF	2	1	0	1	6	6	+0	50.00
Uzbekistan	AHF	2	1	0	1	1	6	−5	50.00
Opponent	Total	27	17	0	10	89	71	+18	62.96

== See also ==
- Bangladesh women's field hockey team
- Bangladesh national indoor hockey team
- Bangladesh under-21 field hockey team
- Bangladesh national field hockey team
