= 2026 Women's Hockey Junior Asia Cup =

Field hockey competition in Asia

Tournament details
- Host country: China
- City: Moqi
- Dates: 4 – 13 September
- Teams: 10 (from 1 confederation)
- Venue: Moqi Training Base

Final positions
- Champions: India (3rd title)
- Runner-up: China
- Third place: Japan

Tournament statistics
- Matches played: 31
- Goals scored: 132 (4.26 per match)
- Top scorer(s): (Bangladesh) Sharika Rimon (India) Sanika Chandrakant Mane (7 goals)
- Best player: (China) Wei Qixiao
- Best young player: (Japan) Rei Yoshida (Bangladesh) Sharika Rimon
- Best goalkeeper: (India) Nidhi

The 2026 Women's Hockey Junior Asia Cup was the tenth edition of the Women's Hockey Junior Asia Cup, the women's international under-20 field hockey championship of Asia, organized by the Asian Hockey Federation. It was held from 4th to 13 September 2026 at the Moqi Training Base in Moqi, China. India, the defending champions, clinched their third consecutive title, beating China in the final. The top 4 teams qualified for the 2027 Junior World Cup.

Japan won their third bronze in the competition, after defeating South Korea. Bangladesh won the Junior Asia Cup Hockey Challenger title.

All matches were live streamed on the official YouTube channel of the Asian Hockey Federation.

== Venue ==
(China) Moqi
Moqi Training Base

== Qualification ==
Pakistan qualified after finishing last in the 2026 Women's Junior AHF Cup, returning to the tournament for the first time since 2012.

=== Qualified teams ===
| Dates | Event | Location | Quotas | Qualifiers |
|---|---|---|---|---|
| 7–15 December 2024 | 2024 Junior Asia Cup | Muscat, Oman | 6 | China; Chinese Taipei; India; Japan; Malaysia; South Korea |
| 12–18 July 2026 | 2026 Junior AHF Cup | Muscat, Oman | 4 | Bangladesh; Hong Kong; Kazakhstan; Pakistan |
| Total | | | 10 | |

== Squads ==
Bangladesh

High Performance Advisor: (Hong Kong) Arif Ali

2. Neeladri Neel
3. Mst Annika
5. Ninisen Rakhain
6. Sanjida Moni
7. Sharika Rimon (C)
8. Mst Rishi
12. Airin Riya
13. Mst Lima
14. Mst Khatun
15. Kona Akter
16. Nadira Ema
17. Fatema Tuzzo hora
18. Heemadri Sukh
19. Sumaya Shimo
20. Prionti Oishi
21. Mst Akter
22. Lonima Nupur
23. Mst Khatun
China

Head Coach: (China) Long Fengyu

1. Xu Mengjiao (GK)
2. Wei Qixiao (C)
3. Zuo Xinyi
5. Hu Anting
7. Chen Jiani
8. Lyu Hongjuan
9. Qi Chenchen
10. Huang Xiyi
11. Yi Xu
12. Feng Jiaxin
13. Liu Jinming
17. Song Lin
22. Zhao Zihui
28. Wang Enting
33. Li Xiaoyan (GK)
63. Wang Lihang (C)
65. Xue Wang
77. Nie Yushuo
Chinese Taipei

Head Coach: (Chinese Taipei) Chang Chun-Hsiu

1. Gu Yu-Tong (GK)
2. Chiang Chih-Tung (C)
4. Jhang Huei-Sin
6. Chen Xiao-Qing
7. Wu Fang-Chi
8. Yang Cheng-Lin
9. Ohoyi Tefi
10. Kao Hsiang-Hua
11. Lin Ya-Wen
13. Jhang Jia-Yu
14. Huang Yi-Chen
15. Chiang Xin-Pei
16. Su Pin-Chiao
19. Yu Shi-Ying
23. Wu Fang-Ju (GK)
25. Chen Wen-Zhen
27. Chen Wen-Jun
41. Tsao Yu-Ching
Hong Kong

Head Coach: (South Africa) Satchi Reddy

1. Shina Tamaki
2. Natisa Maria Theil
3. Shu Sian Cheng
4. Kinya Tsoi
5. Seraphina Bernice Nissen
7. Sum Yu Charlotte Wong
8. Wun Hei Lam
9. Hoi Ching Hebe Tsui
10. Gwyneth Shei
11. Yan Tong Zhu
12. Emily Chow
13. Wun Yung Chloe Lam
14. Hei Ching Kyra Tsang (C)
22. Yuk Kak Wong
23. Hei Li Lau
26. Gabriella Pippa Chen
27. Elena Lian
36. Tsz Hei Lam
India

Head Coach: (Australia) Tim White

3. Lalrinpuii
4. Madhu Sidar
6. Madhu
7. Krishna Sharma
8. Supriya
9. Pooja Malik
11. Khaidem Shileima Chanu (C)
12. Binima Dhan
13. F. Lalbiaksiami
18. Geeta Yadav
19. Tanushree Dinesh Kadu
22. Sukhveer Kaur
24. Tanuja Toppo
25. Engil Harsharani Minz (GK)
32. Puja Sahoo
33. Parwati Topno
42. Sanika Chandrakant Mane
65. Purnima Yadav
88. Nidhi (GK)
99. Roshni Aind
Japan

Head Coach: (Japan) Keiko Miura

1. Riku Kurihara (GK)
2. Hana Asano
3. Aya Aoshima
4. Yoshino Hirai
5. Hana Maruyama
6. Kirari Hayashi
7. Momoka Suzuki
8. Yui Sakai
9. Yui Dobashi
10. Sachika Takahashi (C)
11. Renka Tetsuka
12. Yua Obama
13. Rin Washizu
14. Rei Yoshida
15. Ayano Usui
16. Hinano Kimura
17. Kokona Tanaka
19. Yuina Taya
20. Yuri Yoshioka
41. Mio Noda (GK)
Kazakhstan

Head Coach: (Kazakhstan) Daulet Urmanov

3. Dilnaz Nigmetzhanova
5. Akpeil Kaiyrzhan
6. Yerkezhan Suleimen
7. Zhanar Bektemissova
10. Zhansaya Amangeldi
12. Ayanat Mazhim
15. Arina Perepelkina
16. Aruzhan Ospanova (C, GK)
17. Khaua Yeskendır
18. Alua Bolganbay
21. Dariya Kozhakhmetova
22. Yasmin Seiitzhan
23. Gaukhar Aslankyzy
25. Aruzhan Bolatbek
32. Ayaulym Rakhym (GK)
Malaysia

Head Coach: (Malaysia) Nasihin Ibrahim

1. Nur Ellysha Najwa (GK)
2. Damia Jasman
3. Nurdini Ridzuan
4. Nur Ridzuan (C)
5. Nurul Adnan
6. Rohaizatul Alisha
7. Aqhinatul Hashmi
8. Nur Azli
10. Ainnur Insyirah
11. Nur Mohd
14. Nur Safiya Maisara
15. Nurfitrah Shamsudin
16. Nur Amira Batrisya (GK)
17. Nur Rasyiqah Adawiah
18. Valerina
19. Nurain Atiqah
20. Irdina Jeffrey
21. Anis Nabilah
22. Khaleesya Khairul
23. Natashanajwa Nasharuddin
Pakistan

Head Coach: (Pakistan) Arshad Sahrish

1. Mehak Maria (GK)
2. Parveen Rubesha
3. Raheem Javeria
4. Aslam Areeba
5. Younas Saira
6. Uswa
7. Aiza
8. Aibid Laraib
9. Shariqa (C)
10. Fatima Shareen
11. Afzal Sobia
12. Latif Khadija (GK)
13. Uswa
14. Ashfa
15. Zehra Iffat
16. Shiza
17. Maha
18. Amna
19. Haider Farwa
20. Fatima Kaneez
South Korea

Head Coach: (South Korea) Lim Mi-sook

1. Choi Seoyeon (GK)
4. Kim Minjeong
7. Kim Woori
8. Lee Boyung
9. Eom Jieum
10. Kil Gabin
11. Lee Young-eun
13. Son Nara (GK)
14. Soyeon Park
16. Kim Subin
17. Sin Hyonji
19. Lee Jisoo
21. Kim Nakyung
23. Jung Sebhin
25. Na Kyeongmin
27. Jang Haeji
29. Eun Yeju
30. An Haemin
31. Jeong Yuri
33. Joo Soyeon (C)

Source:FIH

== Challenger Pool ==
All times are local (UTC+8).

| Pos | Team | Pld | W | D | L | GF | GA | GD | Pts | Qualification |
|---|---|---|---|---|---|---|---|---|---|---|
| 1 | Bangladesh | 4 | 4 | 0 | 0 | 22 | 1 | +21 | 12 | Quarter-finals |
| 2 | Kazakhstan | 4 | 2 | 1 | 1 | 5 | 5 | 0 | 7 | Quarter-finals |
| 3 | Pakistan | 4 | 2 | 1 | 1 | 6 | 7 | −1 | 7 | Quarter-finals |
| 4 | Hong Kong | 4 | 1 | 0 | 3 | 1 | 10 | −9 | 3 | Ninth and tenth place match |
| 5 | Chinese Taipei | 4 | 0 | 0 | 4 | 1 | 12 | −11 | 0 | Ninth and tenth place match |

Source: FIH
Rules for classification: 1) points; 2) matches won; 3) goal difference; 4) goals for; 5) head-to-head result; 6) field goals for.

4 September 2026
09:00

| Hong Kong | 0–2 | Pakistan |
|---|---|---|
| | Report | Shariqa 34', 48' |

Umpires:
Nurhidayah Suhaimi (MAS)
Li Lulu (CHN)

4 September 2026
11:00

| Chinese Taipei | 0–2 | Kazakhstan |
|---|---|---|
| | Report | Suleiman 15'; Nigmetzhanova 45' |

Umpires:
Kashmaila (PAK)
Kugannan Segaran (MAS)

5 September 2026
11:00

| Bangladesh | 7–0 | Chinese Taipei |
|---|---|---|
| K. Akter 20'; Ema 32', 34'; Riya 35', 38'; Rimon 51', 57' | Report |

Umpires:
Kashmaila (PAK)
Nurhidayah Suhaimi (MAS)

6 September 2026
13:00

| Hong Kong | 0–2 | Kazakhstan |
|---|---|---|
| | Report | Nigmetzhanova 12'; Suleiman 39' |

Umpires:
Hussain Al Hasani (OMA)
Mahmood Al Hasani (OMA)

6 September 2026
17:00

| Pakistan | 1–5 | Bangladesh |
|---|---|---|
| Shariqa 41' | Report | Nupur 9'; Ema 19'; Rimon 33'; K. Akter 43'; Riya 57' |

Umpires:
Ho Ming Yin (HKG)
Sonali Singh (IND)

7 September 2026
15:00

| Chinese Taipei | 1–2 | Pakistan |
|---|---|---|
| Chen 34' | Report | Laraib 30'; Shariqa 50' |

Umpires:
Rashed Hasan Rony (BAN)
Nurhidayah Suhaimi (MAS)

8 September 2026
09:00

| Bangladesh | 4–0 | Kazakhstan |
|---|---|---|
| Rimon 3', 51'; M. Akter 14'; Lima 46' | Report |

Umpires:
Nurhidayah Suhaimi (MAS)
Yin Yongbo (CHN)

8 September 2026
11:00

| Hong Kong | 1–0 | Chinese Taipei |
|---|---|---|
| Chow 58' | Report |

Umpires:
Kashmaila (PAK)
Li Lulu (CHN)

9 September 2026
09:00

| Bangladesh | 6–0 | Hong Kong |
|---|---|---|
| Rimon 9'; Riya 19', 33'; K. Akter 26'; Lima 31', 48' | Report |

Umpires:
Adilzhan Kudaibergen (KAZ)
Kashmaila (PAK)

9 September 2026
13:00

| Kazakhstan | 1–1 | Pakistan |
|---|---|---|
| Amangeldi 15' | Report | Shariqa 55' |

Umpires:
Ho Ming Yin (HKG)
Mohit Rawat (IND)

== Elite Pool ==
All times are local (UTC+8).

| Pos | Team | Pld | W | D | L | GF | GA | GD | Pts | Qualification |
|---|---|---|---|---|---|---|---|---|---|---|
| 1 | India | 4 | 3 | 1 | 0 | 22 | 2 | +20 | 10 | Quarter-finals |
| 2 | China (H) | 4 | 3 | 1 | 0 | 13 | 2 | +11 | 10 | Quarter-finals |
| 3 | Japan | 4 | 2 | 0 | 2 | 8 | 11 | −3 | 6 | Quarter-finals |
| 4 | South Korea | 4 | 1 | 0 | 3 | 2 | 9 | −7 | 3 | Quarter-finals |
| 5 | Malaysia | 4 | 0 | 0 | 4 | 2 | 23 | −21 | 0 | Quarter-finals |

Source: FIH
Rules for classification: 1) points; 2) matches won; 3) goal difference; 4) goals for; 5) head-to-head result; 6) field goals for.
(H) Hosts

4 September 2026
15:00

| Japan | 2–0 | South Korea |
|---|---|---|
| Taya 5'; Obama 18' | Report |

Umpires:
Liu Yao (CHN)
Lani Nichol (NZL)

4 September 2026
19:00

| China | 6–1 | Malaysia |
|---|---|---|
| Qi 13'; Nie 24'; Feng 38'; Wei 45'; Chen 46'; Wang 50' | Report | Atiqah 48' |

Umpires:
Wagatsuma Junko (JPN)
Ravdeep Sethi (HKG)

5 September 2026
15:00

| India | 4–1 | South Korea |
|---|---|---|
| Mane 8'; Purnima 30'; Puja 45'; Sidar 51' | Report | Kil 57' |

Umpires:
Wagatsuma Junko (JPN)
Li Lulu (CHN)

6 September 2026
09:00

| India | 11–1 | Malaysia |
|---|---|---|
| Puja 1', 42'; Purnima 4', 17'; Dhan 8'; Krishna 14'; Sukhveer 21'; Geeta 28', 53'; Mane 43', 58' | Report | Nur 38' |

Umpires:
Kato Takuma (JPN)
Liu Yao (CHN)

6 September 2026
19:00

| Japan | 1–4 | China |
|---|---|---|
| Hirai 59' | Report | Nie 17'; Qi 22'; Feng 38'; Wei 46' |

Umpires:
Lani Nichol (NZL)
Teoh Joven (SGP)

7 September 2026
13:00

| South Korea | 1–0 | Malaysia |
|---|---|---|
| Park 45' | Report |

Umpires:
Liu Yao (CHN)
Sonali Singh (IND)

8 September 2026
13:00

| Japan | 0–7 | India |
|---|---|---|
| | Report | Krishna 5'; Supriya 9'; Purnima 14', 46'; Geeta 41', 45'; Mane 50' |

Umpires:
Liu Yao (CHN)
Ishara Weerasinghe (SRI)

8 September 2026
19:00

| China | 3–0 | South Korea |
|---|---|---|
| Wei 5'; Zhao 50'; Feng 60' | Report |

Umpires:
Junko Wagatsuma (JPN)
Sonali Singh (IND)

9 September 2026
11:00

| Malaysia | 0–5 | Japan |
|---|---|---|
| | Report | Asano 30'; Yoshida 34'; Taya 34'; Dobashi 40'; Hirai 52' |

Umpires:
Su Boda (CHN)
Mahmood Al Hasani (OMA)

9 September 2026
19:00

| China | 0–0 | India |
|---|---|---|
| | Report |

Umpires:
Fahad Ali Khan (PAK)
Lani Nichol (NZL)

== Ninth place match ==
10 September 2026
10:00

| Hong Kong | 1–3 | Chinese Taipei |
|---|---|---|
| Wong 17' | Report | Chen 5'; Lin 15'; Yu 26' |

Umpires:
Kashmaila (PAK)
Sonali Singh (IND)

== Medal round ==
=== Bracket ===
Quarter-finals
10 September
India | 19
Pakistan | 0
10 September
South Korea | 1
Malaysia | 0
10 September
China | 4
Kazakhstan | 0
10 September
Japan | 2
Bangladesh | 0

Semi-finals
12 September
India | 5
South Korea | 1
12 September
China | 6
Japan | 0

Final
13 September
India | 1
China | 0
Third place
13 September
South Korea | 0
Japan | 2

=== Quarter-finals ===
10 September 2026
12:15

| India | 19–0 | Pakistan |
|---|---|---|
| Puja 7'; Roshni 9', 60+'; Kadu 11'; Sukhveer 13'; Mane 13', 23'; Sidar 16', 39'; Geeta 18'; Toppo 25'; Malik 27', 49', 51'; Purnima 33'; Supriya 40', 54'; Krishna 48'; Dhan 55' | Report |

Umpires:
Adilzhan Kudaibergen (KAZ)
Hussain Al Hasani (OMA)

10 September 2026
14:30

| China | 4–0 | Kazakhstan |
|---|---|---|
| Wang 28', 57'; Nie 51'; Feng 52' | Report |

Umpires:
Kugannan Segaran (MAS)
Rashed Hasan Rony (BAN)

10 September 2026
16:45

| Japan | 2–0 | Bangladesh |
|---|---|---|
| Hirai 26'; Suzuki 47' | Report |

Umpires:
Ravdeep Sethi (HKG)
Su Boda (CHN)

10 September 2026
19:00

| South Korea | 1–0 | Malaysia |
|---|---|---|
| Jung 50' | Report |

Umpires:
Liu Yao (CHN)
Li Lulu (CHN)

=== Seventh and eighth place match ===
12 September 2026
09:00

| Pakistan | 0–2 | Kazakhstan |
|---|---|---|
| | Report | Bektemissova 18'; Gaukhar 30' |

Umpires:
Nurhidayah Suhaimi (MAS)
Ho Ming Yin (HKG)

=== Fifth and sixth place match ===
12 September 2026
10:00

| Bangladesh | 2–1 | Malaysia |
|---|---|---|
| Rimon 31'; K. Akter 50' | Report | Jeffrey 59' |

Umpires:
Mahmood Al Hasani (OMA)
Kim Jeong-yong (KOR)

=== Semi-finals ===
12 September 2026
12:15

| India | 5–1 | South Korea |
|---|---|---|
| Sidar 13'; Supriya 17', 33', 56'; Sukhveer 21' | Report | Jeong 41' |

Umpires:
Junko Wagatsuma (JPN)
Liu Yao (CHN)

12 September 2026
14:30

| China | 6–0 | Japan |
|---|---|---|
| Huang 27', 47'; Nie 42'; Liu 44'; Wang 52'; Chen 56' | Report |

Umpires:
Lani Nichol (NZL)
Sonali Singh (IND)

=== Bronze medal match ===
13 September 2026
12:00

| South Korea | 0–2 | Japan |
|---|---|---|
| | Report | Tetsuka 5'; Suzuki 56' |

Umpires:
Teoh Joven (SGP)
Li Lulu (CHN)

=== Gold medal match ===
13 September 2026
16:30

| India | 1–0 | China |
|---|---|---|
| Mane 17' | Report |

Umpires:
Junko Wagatsuma (JPN)
Lani Nichol (NZL)

== Winners ==
2026 Women's Hockey Junior Asia Cup
(India)
India
3rd title

== Awards ==
The following awards were given at the conclusion of the tournament:

| Top scorer | Best player | Promising player | Best goalkeeper | Promising goalkeeper |
|---|---|---|---|---|
| (India) Sanika Chandrakant Mane | (China) Wei Qixiao | (Japan) Rei Yoshida (Bangladesh) Sharika Rimon | (India) Nidhi | (South Korea) Choi Seoyeon |

== Statistics ==
=== Final standings ===
| Pos | Grp | Team | Pld | W | D | L | GF | GA | GD | Pts | Qualification |
|---|---|---|---|---|---|---|---|---|---|---|---|
| 1st place, gold medalist(s) | Elite | India | 7 | 6 | 1 | 0 | 47 | 3 | +44 | 19 | 2027 Junior World Cup |
| 2nd place, silver medalist(s) | Elite | China (H) | 7 | 5 | 1 | 1 | 23 | 3 | +20 | 16 | 2027 Junior World Cup |
| 3rd place, bronze medalist(s) | Elite | Japan | 7 | 4 | 0 | 3 | 12 | 17 | −5 | 12 | 2027 Junior World Cup |
| 4 | Elite | South Korea | 7 | 2 | 0 | 5 | 4 | 16 | −12 | 6 | 2027 Junior World Cup |
| 5 | Challenger | Bangladesh | 6 | 5 | 0 | 1 | 24 | 4 | +20 | 15 | Eliminated in quarter-finals |
| 6 | Elite | Malaysia | 6 | 0 | 0 | 6 | 3 | 26 | −23 | 0 | Eliminated in quarter-finals |
| 7 | Challenger | Kazakhstan | 6 | 3 | 1 | 2 | 7 | 9 | −2 | 10 | Eliminated in quarter-finals |
| 8 | Challenger | Pakistan | 6 | 2 | 1 | 3 | 6 | 28 | −22 | 7 | Eliminated in quarter-finals |
| 9 | Challenger | Chinese Taipei | 5 | 1 | 0 | 4 | 4 | 13 | −9 | 3 | Eliminated in group stage |
| 10 | Challenger | Hong Kong | 5 | 1 | 0 | 4 | 2 | 13 | −11 | 3 | Eliminated in group stage |

Source: FIH
(H) Hosts

=== Goalscorers ===
There were 132 goals scored in 31 matches, for an average of 4.26 goals per match.

7 goals

- (Bangladesh) Sharika Rimon
- (India) Sanika Chandrakant Mane

6 goals

- (India) Supriya
- (India) Purnima Yadav

5 goals

- (Bangladesh) Airin Riya
- (India) Geeta Yadav
- (Pakistan) Shariqa

4 goals

- (Bangladesh) Kona Akter
- (China) Feng Jiaxin
- (China) Nie Yushuo
- (China) Wang Lihang
- (India) Puja Sahoo
- (India) Madhu Sidar

3 goals

- (Bangladesh) Nadira Ema
- (Bangladesh) Mst Lima
- (China) Wei Qixiao
- (India) Sukhveer Kaur
- (India) Pooja Malik
- (India) Krishna Sharma
- (Japan) Yoshino Hirai

2 goals

- (China) Chen Jiani
- (China) Huang Xiyi
- (China) Qi Chenchen
- (Chinese Taipei) Chen Xiao-Qing
- (India) Binima Dhan
- (India) Roshni Aind
- (Japan) Momoka Suzuki
- (Japan) Yuina Taya
- (Kazakhstan) Dilnaz Nigmetzhanova
- (Kazakhstan) Yerkezhan Suleiman

1 goal

- (Bangladesh) Mst Akter
- (Bangladesh) Lonima Nupur
- (China) Liu Jinming
- (China) Zhao Zihui
- (Chinese Taipei) Lin Ya-Wen
- (Chinese Taipei) Yu Sih-Ying
- (Hong Kong) Emily Chow
- (Hong Kong) Sum Yu Charlotte Wong
- (India) Tanushree Dinesh Kadu
- (India) Tanuja Toppo
- (Japan) Hana Asano
- (Japan) Yui Dobashi
- (Japan) Yua Obama
- (Japan) Renka Tetsuka
- (Japan) Rei Yoshida
- (Kazakhstan) Zhansaya Amangeldi
- (Kazakhstan) Gaukhar Aslankyzy
- (Kazakhstan) Zhanar Bektemissova
- (Malaysia) Irdina Jeffrey
- (Malaysia) Nur Mohd
- (Malaysia) Nurain Atiqah
- (Pakistan) Abid Laraib
- (South Korea) Jeong Yuri
- (South Korea) Jung Sebhin
- (South Korea) Kil Gabin
- (South Korea) Park Soyeon

Source: FIH

== See also ==
- 2026 Men's Hockey Junior Asia Cup
- 2026 Women's Hockey U18 Asia Cup
