= Puja Sahoo =

Indian field hockey player

Personal information
- Born: 2 December 2006 (age 19) Rajgangpur, Odisha, India

Sport
- Sport: Field hockey
- Position: Defender
- Club: Shrachi Bengal Tigers
Senior career
Years	Team	Caps	Goals
2021–	SAI Academy	6	1
2024–	Hockey Odisha	13	3
National team
Years	Team	Caps	Goals
2024–	India U21	19	(4)
2026–	India	1	(1)
Medal record
Women's field hockey
Representing India
Junior Asia Cup
Gold medal – first place	2024 Muscat
Gold medal – first place	2026 Moqi

Puja Sahoo (born 2 December 2006) is an Indian field hockey player who plays as a defender for the national junior team and the national senior team.

== Early life ==
Puja Sahoo, the daughter of Bhikhu Sahoo and Alisha Sahoo, hails from Kukuda village of Sundergarh district in Odisha. Her father is a retired employee of a private mining company. She initially played with bamboo sticks before her local coach Dominic Toppo provided her a second-hand stick. Later, her father bought her new sticks by borrowing. She played mixed-gender matches against boys in her village.

== Career ==
Puja trained at the STC centre in Sundergarh from 2018 to 2021. She joined the National Centre of Excellence in Delhi. Her local coach Pradeep Sarangi and former Indian goalkeeper and coach of Odisha team, Edgar Mascarenhas trained her in initial days.

She led the Sports Hostel Odisha team as vice-captain in the first phase of the 2nd Khelo India U21 Women's Hockey League in Chennai in 2023 and won bronze at the second phase of the league. She was part of the Odisha U18 team that reached quarter-finals at the 4th Khelo India Youth Games in Gwalior in 2023 and also part of the team that won the bronze at the 5th edition in Chennai in 2024.

Puja was named in the national junior team for the Europe tour in 2024. She was part of the team that won the 2024 Junior Asia Cup in Muscat. She represented India in the 2025 Junior World Cup where the team finished 10th. In 2025, she became part of the Shrachi Bengal Tigers and competed in the 2025–26 Hockey India League.

Puja scored 4 goals for her national junior team that won the 2026 Junior Asia Cup in China. She made debut for the senior national team in the 2026 Women's Asian Champions Trophy against Malaysia where she scored a goal through penalty corner and claimed the Player of the Match award.
