= Park Yeong-eun =

South Korean field hockey player (born 2003)

Personal information
- Born: 8 July 2003 (age 23) South Korea

Sport
- Sport: Field hockey
- Position: Defence
- Club: Korea National Sport University
National team
Years	Team	Caps	Goals
2022–2024	South Korea U–21	18	(2)
2022–	South Korea	18	(1)
Medal record
Women's field hockey
Representing South Korea
Junior Asian Cup
Bronze medal – third place	2024 Muscat

Park Yeong-eun (Korean: 박영은, born 8 July 2003) is a field hockey player from South Korea, who plays as a defender.

== Career ==
=== Under–21 ===
From 2022 until 2024, Park was a member of the South Korean U–21 team. She represented the team at three major tournaments, including the 2022 and 2023 editions of the FIH Junior World Cup in Potchefstroom and Santiago, respectively, as well as the 2024 Junior Asian Cup in Muscat, where she won bronze.

=== Senior national team ===
Park made her senior international debut for South Korea in 2024. She earned her first senior international cap at the 2023–24 FIH Nations Cup in Terrassa.

Since her debut, Park has been included in national teams sporadically. She represented the team at the 2024 Asian Champions Trophy in Rajgir, as well as during a test series against Germany in Wiesbaden in 2025. Her most recent appearances came at the 2025 Asian Cup in Hangzhou.

== International goals ==
Goal	Date	Location	Opponent	Score	Result	Competition	Ref.
1	5 September 2025	Gongshu Canal Sports Park Stadium, Hangzhou, China	Chinese Taipei	6–0	9–0	2025 Asian Cup	
