= Hanami Saito =

Japanese field hockey player

Personal information
- Born: 5 June 2004 (age 22) Yamagata Prefecture, Japan
- Height: 158 cm (5 ft 2 in)
- Weight: 56 kg (123 lb)

Sport
- Sport: Field hockey
- Position: Defence
- Club: Crowning Glories
National team
Years	Team	Caps	Goals
2023–	Japan U–21	21	(9)
2024–	Japan	9	(2)
Medal record
Women's field hockey
Representing Japan
Asian Cup
Bronze medal – third place	2025 Hangzhou
Asian Champions Trophy
Bronze medal – third place	2024 Rajgir
Junior Asian Cup
Bronze medal – third place	2023 Kakamigahara

Hanami Saito (齋藤 はなみ, born 5 June 2004) is a field hockey player from Japan.

== Personal life ==
Hanami Saito was born on 5 June 2004, in the Yamagata Prefecture.

She is a former student of Yonezawa Commercial High School.

== Career ==
=== Domestic league ===
In the Japanese national league, Matsunami represents the Crowning Glories.

=== Under–21 ===
Saito made her junior international debut in 2023. She made her first appearances for the Japanese U–21 team during a test series against Australia in the Gold Coast. She went on to represent Japan again at the Junior Asian Cup in Kakamigahara, winning a bronze medal. To close out 2023, Saito represented Japan again at the FIH Junior World Cup in Santiago, concluding the tournament with a seventh-place finish.

In 2024 she was a member of the junior squad at the Junior Asian Cup in Muscat.

=== Cherry Blossoms ===
In 2024, Saito was named in the senior national team for the first time. She made her international debut at the Asian Champions Trophy in Rajgir. At the tournament she scored her first international goal for Japan, helping the team to a bronze medal.

She was named in the squad for the 2024–25 FIH Nations Cup in Santiago.

== International goals ==
The following is a list of goals scored by Saito at international level.

Goal	Date	Location	Opponent	Score	Result	Competition	Ref.
1	14 November 2024	Rajgir Sports Complex Hockey Stadium, Rajgir, India	China	1–1	1–2	2024 Asian Champions Trophy	
2	26 February 2025	Centro Deportivo de Hockey Césped Estadio Nacional, Santiago, Chile	United States	2–4	2–4	2024–25 FIH Nations Cup	
