= Choi Ji-yun =

South Korean field hockey player (born 1999)

Personal information
- Born: 22 August 2003 (age 22) South Korea

Sport
- Sport: Field hockey
- Position: Midfield
- Club: Korea National Sport University
National team
Years	Team	Caps	Goals
2022–	South Korea	21	(0)
2023–2024	South Korea U–21	18	(10)
Medal record
Women's field hockey
Representing South Korea
Junior Asian Cup
Silver medal – second place	2023 Kakamigahara
Bronze medal – third place	2024 Muscat

Choi Ji-yun (Korean: 최지윤, born 22 August 2003) is a field hockey player from South Korea, who plays as a midfielder.

== Career ==
=== Under–21 ===
Throughout 2023 and 2024, Choi was a member of the South Korean U–21 team. During 2023 she appeared at the Junior Asian Cup in Kakamigahara, where she won a silver medal, as well as the FIH Junior World Cup in Santiago.

In 2024 she won her second medal with the junior national team, taking home bronze at the Junior Asian Cup in Muscat.

=== Senior national team ===
Choi made her senior international debut for South Korea in 2022. She earned her first senior international cap at the FIH Nations Cup in Valencia.

Since her debut, Choi has been a regular inclusion in the national team. She has appeared at the 2023–24 and 2024–25 editions of the FIH Nations Cup in Terrassa and Santiago, respectively. Her most recent appearances were at the 2025 Asian Cup in Hangzhou.
