= Sakshi Rana =

Indian field hockey player

Personal information
- Born: 31 August 2007 (age 19) Sonipat, Haryana, India

Sport
- Sport: Field hockey
- Position: Forward/Midfielder
Senior career
Years	Team	Caps	Goals
–	Hockey Haryana	-	-
2025–	Odisha Warriors	-	-
National team
Years	Team	Caps	Goals
2023–2024	India U21	16	(4)
2025–	India	30	(7)
Medal record
Women's field hockey
Representing India
Asian Games
Gold medal – first place	2026 Aichi–Nagoya	Team
Junior Asia Cup
Gold medal – first place	2024 Oman

Sakshi Rana (born 31 August 2007) is an Indian hockey player from Haryana. She plays for the India women's national field hockey team as a forward or a midfielder. She is registered with Hockey Haryana and plays for the state unit in the domestic tournaments. She played for Vedanta Odisha Warriors in the inaugural Women's Hockey India League 2025.

== Early life and career ==
Rana is from Sonipat, Haryana. She was trained by former India captain and coach Pritam Rani Siwach.

== Career ==
In December 2023, Rana represented India U21 team in the 2023 Junior World Cup held at Santiago, Chile, where India finished ninth. Earlier in August 2023, she took part in the under-21, 4–Nation's Junior Women's Invitational Tournament at Düsseldorf.

In February 2025, she made her senior India debut at Kalinga Stadium, Bhubaneswar, against Spain in the 2024–25 Women's FIH Pro League and also scored her first goal for India.

In May 2024, she was chosen as the vice–captain of the 22-member Indian Junior Women's team that was announced for the tour of Europe from 21 to 20 May 2024. In 2024, she was also part of the Indian junior team that won gold at the Junior Asia Cup.
