= Sanika Chandrakant Mane =

Indian field hockey player (born 2006)

Personal information
- Born: 18 November 2006 (age 19) Kasaba Nool, Kolhapur, Maharashtra, India

Sport
- Sport: Field hockey
- Position: Forward
Senior career
Years	Team	Caps	Goals
2023–	Hockey Maharashtra	5	3
National team
Years	Team	Caps	Goals
2026–	India U21	7	(7)
Medal record
Women's field hockey
Representing India
Junior Asia Cup
Gold medal – first place	2026 Moqi

Sanika Chandrakant Mane (born 18 November 2006) is an Indian field hockey player who plays as a forward for the Indian junior national team. She was part of the team that won the 2026 junior Asia Cup in China.

== Early life ==
Sanika Mane was born and raised in Nool, a village in Gadhinglaj taluka of Kolhapur district, Maharashtra. Her father, Chandrakant Mane, is a farmer, while her mother, Jyoti, is a former national-level hockey player who works as a primary school English teacher. Mane initially took an interest in athletics while attending school in Nool before choosing hockey.

== Career ==
Mane represented the New English School team of Nool in the 2023 Jawaharlal Nehru Hockey Tournament where she scored eight goals, including two hat-tricks. Her early talent was recognised by coach Aniket More, who helped her progress in hockey. She subsequently trained with the Sports Authority of India. She captained the Maharashtra junior women's team at the 2024 Hockey India Junior Women West Zone Championship.

Mane was selected for the Indian under-21 team for a tour of the United Kingdom in 2026. She attended the selection camp in Bengaluru, where she was selected for the Indian squad for the junior Asia Cup.

Mane scored the only goal in India's victory against China by 1–0 in the final of the 2026 Junior Asia Cup and was named Player of the Match. She was the joint top scorer of the tournament with seven goals.
