= Kanika Siwach =

Indian hockey player

Personal information
- Born: 1 August 2005 (age 21) Sonipat, Haryana, India

Sport
- Sport: Field hockey
- Position: Forward
- Club: Odisha Warriors (Hero Hockey India League)
Senior career
Years	Team	Caps	Goals
–	Railway Sports Promotion Board	-	-
–	Hockey Haryana	-	-
National team
Years	Team	Caps	Goals
2024–2025	India U21	12	(13)
Medal record
Women's field hockey
Representing India
Junior Asia Cup
Gold medal – first place	2024 Muscat	Team

Kanika Siwach (born 1 August 2005) is an Indian Junior field hockey player from Haryana. She was selected for the senior Indian team ahead of the 2024-25 Women's FIH Pro League. She plays as a forward for Railway Sports Promotion Board and Hockey Haryana in the domestic tournaments and for Odisha Warriors in the Hero Hockey India League.

== Early life ==
She is from Sonipat, Haryana. Her father Kuldeep Siwach, her mother Pritam Rani, and her brother Yashdeep, were hockey players. She is a product of Pritam Siwach Hockey Academy in Sonipat which is run by her mother Pritam Rani, a former Indian captain and Dronacharya Awardee.

== Career ==
She played the 2025 junior World Cup as part of the Indian U21 team at Santiago, Chile from 1 to 13 December 2025.

In December 2024, she made her Junior India debut in the 2024 Women's Hockey Junior Asia Cup at Muscat, Oman, where she scored eight goals in six matches including two hat-tricks.

In May 2024, she was name in the Indian junior women's team for the Europe tour for six matches across Belgium, Germany and the Netherlands.

=== Domestic career ===
In November 2023, she represented Haryana in the 37th National Games (Women) at Goa. Again in February 2025, she played for Haryana in the 38th National Games at Haridwar, Uttarakhand. Earlier in December 2021 she represented Pritam Siwach Hockey Academy in the Khelo India Women's Hockey League 2021 (Under 21) Phase 1at Delhi, and in February 2022, she took part in Phase 2 at Lucknow, Uttar Pradesh.
