= 2021 Women's Hockey Junior Asia Cup =

Cancelled Women's Junior Hockey Cup

2021 Women's Junior Asia Cup
Tournament details
- Host country: Japan
- City: Kakamigahara
- Dates: Cancelled
- Teams: 8 (from 1 confederation)

The 2021 Women's Hockey Junior Asia Cup was scheduled to be the eighth edition of the Women's Hockey Junior Asia Cup. The tournament was scheduled to be held in Kakamigahara, Japan from 6 to 12 April 2020. In March 2020 it was announced that the tournament would be postponed due to concerns about the COVID-19 pandemic. On 27 October 2020 it was announced the tournament would be held from 16 to 22 August 2021. On 13 August 2021, the tournament was officially cancelled.

China were the defending champions. The tournament served as the Asian qualifier for the 2021 FIH Junior World Cup, with the top three qualifying. After the cancellation the Asian Hockey Federation selected China, India and Japan as the Asian representatives at the 2021 Junior World Cup.

== Qualification ==
The top six teams from the 2015 edition qualified directly and they were joined by the top two from the 2019 Junior AHF Cup.

=== Qualified teams ===
The following teams have qualified for the tournament.

Dates	Event	Location	Quotas	Qualifiers
5–13 September 2015	2015 Junior Asia Cup	Changzhou, China	6	China; India; Japan; Malaysia; South Korea; Thailand
9–15 September 2019	2019 Junior AHF Cup	Singapore	2	Singapore; Uzbekistan
Total			8	

== See also ==
- 2021 Men's Hockey Junior Asia Cup
