= Women's Junior AHF Cup =

International field hockey tournament

- Current season, competition or edition: 2026 Women's Junior AHF Cup
- Sport: Field hockey
- Founded: 2003; 23 years ago
- First season: 2003
- No. of teams: 6
- Confederation: AHF (Asia)
- Most recent champion: Bangladesh (1st title) (2026)
- Most titles: Chinese Taipei (4 titles)

The Women's Junior AHF Cup is a women's international under-21 field hockey competition in Asia organized by the Asian Hockey Federation. The tournament was founded in 2003 and serves as the qualification tournament for the next Junior Asia Cup.

Four different teams have won the tournament. Chinese Taipei are the only team to have won it more than once, claiming four titles in total. Singapore, Kazakhstan, Malaysia and Bangladesh have all claimed one title. Bangladesh are the defending champions having won their first title at the 2026 edition in Muscat.

== Results ==
#	Year	Host	Final			Third place match			Teams
#	Year	Host	Winner	Score	Runner-up	Third place	Score	Fourth place	Teams
1	2003; Details	Singapore	Chinese Taipei	Round-robin	Hong Kong	Singapore	Only three teams		3
2	2007; Details	Kuala Lumpur, Malaysia	Malaysia	Round-robin	Singapore	Hong Kong	Only three teams		3
3	2011; Details	Bangkok, Thailand	Chinese Taipei	Round-robin	Sri Lanka	Thailand	Round-robin	Kazakhstan	5
4	2014; Details	Hong Kong	Chinese Taipei	Round-robin	Singapore	Hong Kong	Only three teams		3
5	2019; Details	Singapore	Singapore	Round-robin	Uzbekistan	Chinese Taipei	Round-robin	Hong Kong	6
6	2022; Details	Taldykorgan, Kazakhstan	Kazakhstan	Round-robin	Chinese Taipei	Uzbekistan	Round-robin	Indonesia	6
7	2024; Details	Singapore	Chinese Taipei	Round-robin	Bangladesh	Thailand	Round-robin	Sri Lanka	7
8	2026; Details	Muscat, Oman	Bangladesh	2–0	Kazakhstan	Uzbekistan	10–1	Hong Kong	5

== Summary ==
Team	Winners	Runners-up	Third place	Fourth place
Chinese Taipei	4 (2003, 2011, 2014, 2024)	1 (2022)	1 (2019)	
Singapore	1 (2019*)	2 (2007, 2014)	1 (2003*)	
Kazakhstan	1 (2022*)	1 (2026)		1 (2011)
Bangladesh	1 (2026)	1 (2024)		
Malaysia	1 (2007*)			
Hong Kong		1 (2003)	2 (2007, 2014*)	2 (2019, 2026)
Uzbekistan		1 (2019)	2 (2022, 2026)	
Sri Lanka		1 (2011)		1 (2024)
Thailand			2 (2011*, 2024)	
Indonesia				1 (2022)

* = hosts

== Team appearances ==
Team	(Singapore) 2003	(Malaysia) 2007	(Thailand) 2011	(Hong Kong) 2014	(Singapore) 2019	(Kazakhstan) 2022	(Singapore) 2024	(Oman) 2026	Total
Bangladesh	–	–	–	–	5th	–	2nd	1st	3
Chinese Taipei	1st	–	1st	1st	3rd	2nd	1st	–	6
Hong Kong	2nd	3rd	5th	3rd	4th	5th	5th	4th	8
Indonesia	–	–	–	–	–	4th	7th	–	2
Kazakhstan	–	–	4th	–	–	1st	–	2nd	3
Malaysia	–	1st	–	–	–	–	–	–	1
Pakistan	–	–	–	–	–	–	–	5th	1
Singapore	3rd	2nd	–	2nd	1st	–	6th	–	5
Sri Lanka	–	–	2nd	–	6th	–	4th	–	3
Tajikistan	–	–	–	–	–	6th	–	–	1
Thailand	–	–	3rd	–	–	–	3rd	–	2
Uzbekistan	–	–	–	–	2nd	3rd	–	3rd	3
Total (12)	3	3	5	3	6	6	7	5	

== See also ==
- Men's Junior AHF Cup
- Women's AHF Cup
- Women's Hockey Junior Asia Cup
- Women's Hockey U18 Asia Cup
