= Yuan Meng (field hockey) =

Chinese field hockey player

Dan Wen
Personal information
- Born: 7 February 1996 (age 30) China

Sport
- Sport: Field hockey
- Position: Midfield
National team
Years	Team	Caps	Goals
2013–2016	China U–21	21	(3)
2013–	China	45	(5)
Medal record
Women's field hockey
Representing China
Asian Cup
Silver medal – second place	2017 Kakamigahara	Team
Asian Champions Trophy
Silver medal – second place	2016 Singapore	Team
Junior Asian Cup
Gold medal – first place	2015 Changzhou	Team

Yuan Meng (born 7 February 1996) is a field hockey player from China, who plays as a midfielder.

== Career ==
=== Under–21 ===
Yuan made her junior international debut in 2013. She captained the team at the FIH Junior World Cup in Mönchengladbach.

In 2015, she represented the junior team again. Her first appearance was at a 6–Nations Tournament in Breda, followed by the Junior Asian Cup in Changzhou, where she won a gold medal.

Yuan made her final appearance for the junior team in 2016, representing China at the FIH Junior World Cup in Santiago.

=== National team ===
As well as making her junior debut, Yuan also debuted for the senior national team in 2013. She appeared in one match at the Asian Champions Trophy in Kakamigahara.

Yuan returned to the national team in 2016. She won a silver medal at the 2016 Asian Champions Trophy in Singapore, followed by another silver medal at the 2017 Asian Cup in Kakamigahara.

Following a five–year hiatus from the national team, Yuan returned to the squad once again in 2022. She made appearances during season three of the FIH Pro League, as well as the FIH World Cup held in Terrassa and Amsterdam.

She continued her form in the national team in 2024, appearing in season five of the FIH Pro League, as well as the International Festival of Hockey in Perth.

==== International goals ====
Goal	Date	Location	Opponent	Score	Result	Competition	Ref.
1	28 October 2017	Gifu Hockey Stadium, Kakamigahara, Japan	Malaysia	4–4	5–4	2017 Asian Cup	
2	18 June 2022	Hazelaarweg Stadion, Rotterdam, Netherlands	United States	2–0	3–2	2021–22 FIH Pro League	
3	18 June 2022	Hazelaarweg Stadion, Rotterdam, Netherlands	United States	3–0	3–2	2021–22 FIH Pro League	
4	4 February 2024	Kalinga Stadium, Bhubaneswar, India	Australia	1–0	3–0	2023–24 FIH Pro League	
5	4 February 2024	Kalinga Stadium, Bhubaneswar, India	Australia	3–0	3–0	2023–24 FIH Pro League	
