= India women's national under-21 field hockey team =

Under-21 hockey team that represents India

India U21 women
- Association: Hockey India
- Confederation: Asian Hockey Federation
- Head Coach: (Australia) Tim White
- Captain: Khaidem Shileima Chanu

FIH ranking
- Current: 8

Last international
- India 1–0 China (Moqi, 13 September 2026)

Biggest win
- India 19–0 Pakistan (Moqi, 10 September 2026)

Junior World Cup
- Appearances: 7 (first in 2001)
- Best result: (bronze) 3rd (2013)

Junior Asia Cup
- Appearances: 9 (first in 1992)
- Best result: (gold) Champions (2023, 2024, 2026)
Medal record
Junior World Cup
| Bronze medal – third place | 2013 Mönchengladbach |
Junior Asia Cup
| Gold medal – first place | 2023 Kakamigahara |
| Gold medal – first place | 2024 Muscat |
| Gold medal – first place | 2026 Moqi |
| Silver medal – second place | 2012 Bangkok |
| Bronze medal – third place | 1992 Kuala Lumpur |
| Bronze medal – third place | 2000 Kuala Lumpur |
| Bronze medal – third place | 2004 Hyderabad |
| Bronze medal – third place | 2008 Kuala Lumpur |

The India women's national under-21 field hockey team represents India in women's under-21 field hockey competitions. It is controlled by Hockey India, the governing body for field hockey in India. It is one of the most successful junior hockey teams in the world, having won a bronze in the World Cup and the title of Asia Cup thrice. They are the reigning Asian Champions, holding the title since 2023. The team is currently ranked 8th in the world and 1st in Asia.

== History ==
India's first recorded international tournament is the inaugural 1992 Junior Asia Cup and they won bronze. They missed the 1993 Junior World Cup spot as only the finalists could qualify. They did not participate in the 1996 Junior Asia Cup. They won bronze in the 2000 Junior Asia Cup, beating Japan 3–1 and qualified to the 2001 Junior World Cup. India lost to the Netherlands by a goal margin, defeated USA, and had a goalless draw with New Zealand. They could not qualify to the medal round, but finished 9th, winning all the classification games. India hosted the 2004 Junior Asia Cup for the first time, and finished with bronze. In the 2005 Junior World Cup, India had mixed results as they won Canada, lost to Germany and a draw with South Africa. In the medal round, they held a goalless draw with Argentina, a 1-1 draw with Scotland and a 2–2 draw with Korea. It did not help them to qualify for the knockout stage and finished 11th. They added another bronze to their cabinet in the 2008 Junior Asia Cup. India in the 2009 Junior World Cup, defeated Australia and Belarus to made it to the medal round. They missed the knockout stage as they lost to Korea and England, finishing 10th.

India made it to the final of the 2012 Junior Asia Cup, for the first time in history, but went down to China to settle with silver. They started with a big loss against Australia in the 2013 Junior World Cup, but entered the quarter finals by winning New Zealand and Russia. India won Spain to enter semi final but lost it to the Netherlands. They won the historic bronze by edging England in the penalties. India missed the 2016 Junior World Cup, as they finished outside the podium in the 2015 Junior Asia Cup.

India had a strong start in the 2022 Junior World Cup, beating Germany and Wales. They entered the semi final with a quarter final victory over Korea but lost to the Dutch in the clash for the final. They missed the bronze to England in penalties. India won their maiden Junior Asia Cup title, by winning the 2023 edition. They beat Korea by 2–1 in the final to clinch the gold. In the 2023 Junior World Cup, India narrowly lost to Germany and Belgium and finished 9th.

India retained their title in the 2024 Junior Asia Cup, defeating China in the final. They lost the quarter final spot to Germany in the group stage of the 2025 Junior World Cup and finished 10th. India are the defending Asian champions, having won their third consecutive Asia title in 2026.

== Tournament record ==
=== Major tournaments ===
Junior World Cup
| Year | Host | Round | Position | Pld | W | D | L | GF | GA |
|---|---|---|---|---|---|---|---|---|---|
| 1989 | Ottawa, Canada | Did not qualify | | | | | | | |
| 1993 | Terrassa, Spain | Did not qualify | | | | | | | |
| 1997 | Seongnam, South Korea | Did not qualify | | | | | | | |
| 2001 | Buenos Aires, Argentina | Group stage | 9th | 7 | 5 | 1 | 1 | 21 | 2 |
| 2005 | Santiago, Chile | Medal round | 11th | 8 | 2 | 4 | 2 | 13 | 13 |
| 2009 | Boston, United States | Medal round | 9th | 7 | 4 | 0 | 3 | 18 | 11 |
| 2013 | Mönchengladbach, Germany | Semi-finals | 3rd place, bronze medalist(s) | 6 | 3 | 1 | 2 | 18 | 13 |
| 2016 | Santiago, Chile | Did not qualify | | | | | | | |
| 2022 | Potchefstroom, South Africa | Semi-finals | 4th | 6 | 4 | 1 | 1 | 16 | 7 |
| 2023 | Santiago, Chile | Group stage | 9th | 6 | 2 | 2 | 2 | 25 | 13 |
| 2025 | Santiago, Chile | Group stage | 10th | 6 | 3 | 1 | 2 | 23 | 7 |
| 2027 | TBD | Qualified | | | | | | | |
| | Total | | 3rd | 46 | 23 | 10 | 13 | 134 | 66 |

Junior Asia Cup
| Year | Host | Round | Position | Pld | W | D | L | GF | GA |
|---|---|---|---|---|---|---|---|---|---|
| 1992 (Note: Complete group-stage results are not available in published official records.) | Kuala Lumpur, Malaysia | Semi-finals | 3rd place, bronze medalist(s) | 2 | 1 | 0 | 1 | 3 | 3 |
| 1996 | Shirane, Japan | Did not participate | | | | | | | |
| 2000 | Kuala Lumpur, Malaysia | Semi-finals | 3rd place, bronze medalist(s) | 5 | 3 | 0 | 2 | 32 | 6 |
| 2004 | Hyderabad, India | Round Robin | 3rd place, bronze medalist(s) | 4 | 1 | 0 | 3 | 7 | 8 |
| 2008 | Kuala Lumpur, Malaysia | Semi-finals | 3rd place, bronze medalist(s) | 5 | 3 | 0 | 2 | 24 | 6 |
| 2012 | Bangkok, Thailand | Final | 2nd place, silver medalist(s) | 6 | 4 | 0 | 2 | 33 | 12 |
| 2015 | Changzhou, China | Semi-finals | 4th | 6 | 3 | 1 | 2 | 40 | 10 |
| 2021 | Kakamigahara, Japan | Cancelled | | | | | | | |
| 2023 | Kakamigahara, Japan | Final | 1st place, gold medalist(s) | 6 | 5 | 1 | 0 | 40 | 4 |
| 2024 | Muscat, Oman | Final | 1st place, gold medalist(s) | 6 | 4 | 1 | 1 | 32 | 5 |
| 2026 | Moqi, China | Final | 1st place, gold medalist(s) | 7 | 6 | 1 | 0 | 47 | 3 |
| | Total | | 3 Titles | 47 | 30 | 4 | 13 | 258 | 57 |

Junior Asia Cup (1992–2012) history
| Year | Round | Score | Result |
|---|---|---|---|
| 1992 | Semi final | China 2–1 India | Loss |
| 1992 | 3/4 | India 2–1 Japan | Win |
| 2000 | Group B | India 17–0 Thailand | Win |
| 2000 | Group B | India 9–0 Chinese Taipei | Win |
| 2000 | Group B | Japan 3–2 India | Loss |
| 2000 | Semi final | South Korea 2–1 India | Loss |
| 2000 | 3/4 | India 3–1 Japan | Win |
| 2004 | Round Robin | South Korea 2–1 India | Loss |
| 2004 | Round Robin | Japan 3–2 India | Loss |
| 2004 | Round Robin | China 3–2 India | Loss |
| 2004 | 3/4 | India 2–0 Japan | Win |
| 2008 | Group B | India 8–0 Singapore | Win |
| 2008 | Group B | South Korea 3–2 India | Loss |
| 2008 | Group B | India 10–0 Chinese Taipei | Win |
| 2008 | Semi final | China 2–1 India | Loss |
| 2008 | 3/4 | India 3–1 Japan | Win |
| 2012 | Group A | India 16–0 Sri Lanka | Win |
| 2012 | Group A | India 9–0 Singapore | Win |
| 2012 | Group A | China 5–2 India | Loss |
| 2012 | Group A | India 2–1 Malaysia | Win |
| 2012 | Semi final | India 2–1 Japan | Win |
| 2012 | Final | China 5–2 India | Loss |

== Honours ==
=== Major tournaments ===
- Junior World Cup:
  - (bronze) Third Place: 2013

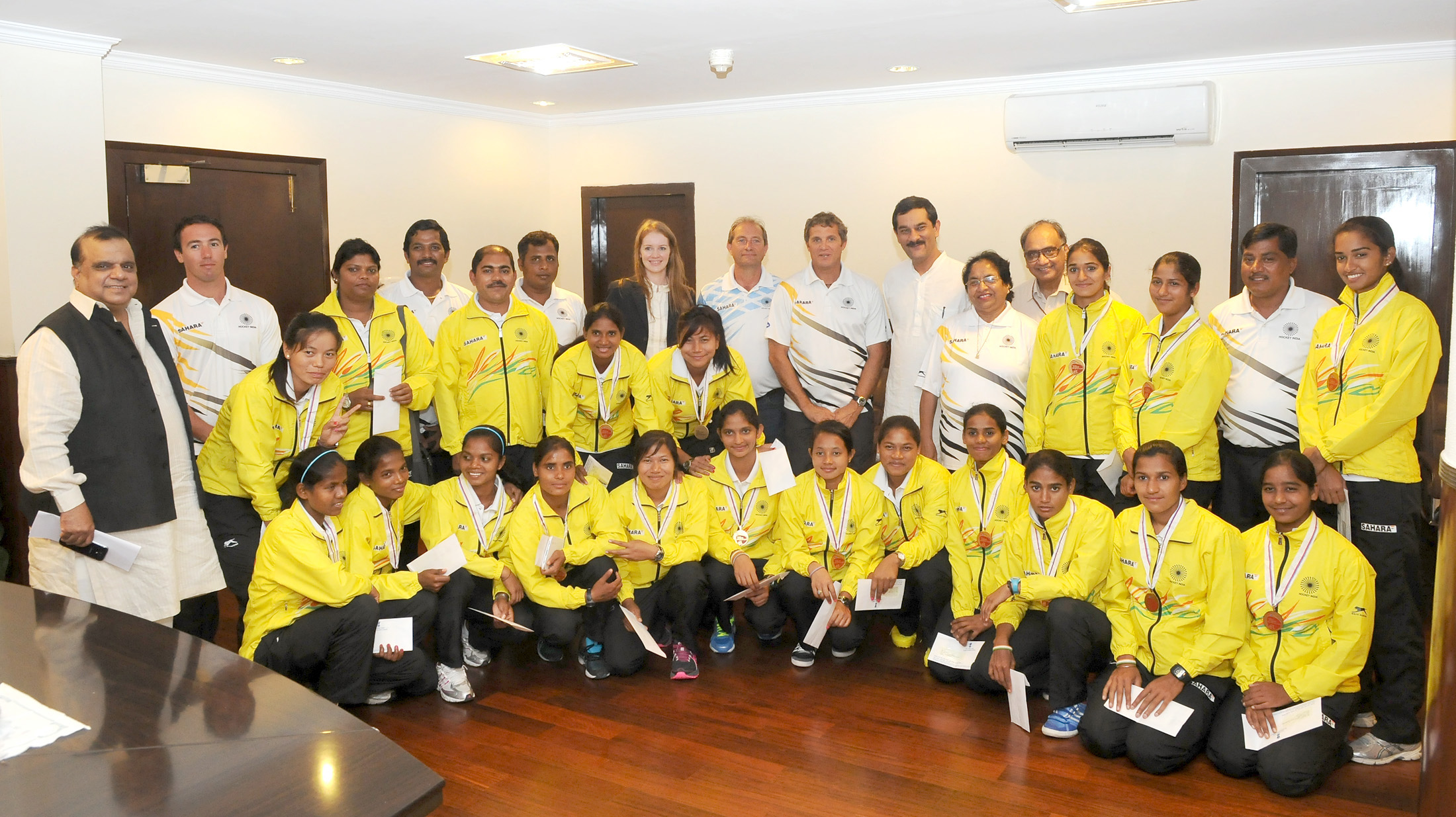
Members of the Indian junior women's team after winning bronze at the 2013 Women's Hockey Junior World Cup, being felicitated in New Delhi.

- Junior Asia Cup:
  - (gold) Champions: 2023, 2024, 2026
  - (silver) Runner-up: 2012
  - (bronze) Third Place: 1992, 2000, 2004, 2008

== Current squad ==
The following Indian junior women's team named for the 2026 Junior Asia Cup, that held at Moqi, China from 4 to 13 September 2026

Head coach: (Australia) Tim White

Players, caps and goals updated as of 13 September 2026.

| No. | Pos. | Player | Date of birth (age) | Caps | Goals | Club |
|---|---|---|---|---|---|---|
| 25 | GK | Engil Harsharani Minz | 24 July 2006 (age 20) | 4 | | |
| 88 | GK | Nidhi | 1 January 2006 (age 20) | 19 | | |
| 13 | DF | F. Lalbiaksiami | 13 March 2007 (age 19) | | | |
| 6 | DF | Madhu | 25 December 2008 (age 17) | 7 | | |
| 33 | DF | Parwati Topno | 2 December 2006 (age 19) | 7 | | |
| 32 | DF | Puja Sahoo | 2 December 2006 (age 19) | 19 | 4 | |
| 8 | DF | Supriya | 18 August 2008 (age 18) | 7 | 6 | |
| 9 | DF | Pooja Malik | 17 December 2007 (age 18) | 7 | 3 | |
| 12 | MF | Binima Dhan | 15 November 2006 (age 19) | 13 | 3 | |
| 18 | MF | Geeta Yadav | 1 July 2006 (age 20) | 7 | 5 | |
| 11 | MF | Khaidem Shileima Chanu (Captain) | 14 April 2006 (age 20) | 19 | | |
| 55 | MF | Roshni Aind | 1 January 2008 (age 18) | 7 | 2 | |
| 24 | MF | Tanuja Toppo | 14 October 2007 (age 19) | 7 | 1 | |
| 19 | MF | Tanushree Dinesh Kadu | 24 January 2006 (age 20) | 5 | 1 | |
| 7 | FW | Krishna Sharma | 7 February 2008 (age 18) | 7 | 3 | |
| 3 | FW | Lalrinpuii | 14 October 2006 (age 20) | 8 | 1 | |
| 65 | FW | Purnima Yadav | 19 October 2007 (age 19) | 11 | 8 | |
| 42 | FW | Sanika Chandrakant Mane | 18 November 2006 (age 19) | 7 | 7 | |
| 22 | FW | Sukhveer Kaur | 28 July 2006 (age 20) | 12 | 3 | |
| 15 | FW | Madhu Sidar | 24 December 2009 (age 16) | 7 | 4 | |

== Coaching staff ==
| Position | Name |
|---|---|
| Head Coach | (Australia) Tim White |
| Team Manager | (India) Neha Rawat |
| Assistant Coach | (India) Bipin Fernandez |
| Video Analyst | (India) Amuthaprakash Perumal |
| Physiotherapist | (India) Pooja Chandrakant Swar (India) Maitri Manish Gala |
| Physical Trainer | (India) Kavita Nambisan |
| Masseuse | (India) Nazma |

== Results and fixtures ==
The following is a list of match results in the last 12 months, as well as any future matches that have been scheduled.

Win Draw Loss Fixture

=== 2026 ===
All times are local (UTC+5:30).

| 5 July 2026 Practice Match 1 | Scotland senior | 3–2 | India | Edinburgh, Scotland |
| 18:00 | | Report | | Stadium: Peffermill Playing Fields, The University of Edinburgh |

| 6 July 2026 Practice Match 2 | Scotland senior | 3–1 | India | Edinburgh, Scotland |
| 23:30 | | Report | | Stadium: Peffermill Playing Fields, The University of Edinburgh |

| 8 July 2026 Practice Match 3 | India | 6–1 | United States | Lilleshall, England |
| 23:30 | | Report | | Stadium: Lilleshall National Sports Centre |

| 9 July 2026 Practice Match 4 | England | 0–2 | India | Lilleshall, England |
| 23:30 | | Report | | Stadium: Lilleshall National Sports Centre |

| 11 July 2026 Practice Match 5 | United States | 1–1 (3–2 p) | India | Lilleshall, England |
| 21:00 | | Report | | Stadium: Lilleshall National Sports Centre |

| 12 July 2026 Practice Match 6 | England | 0–2 | India | Lilleshall, England |
| 23:30 | | Report | | Stadium: Lilleshall National Sports Centre |

| 14 July 2026 Practice Match 7 | Belgium | 2–1 | India | Lilleshall, England |
| 14:30 | | Report | | Stadium: Lilleshall National Sports Centre |

| 5 September 2026 2026 Junior Asia Cup Elite | India | 4–1 | South Korea | Moqi, China |
| 12:30 | Mane 8'; Purnima 30'; Sahoo 45'; Sidar 51' | Report | Kil 57' | Stadium: Moqi Training Base |

| 6 September 2026 2026 Junior Asia Cup Elite | India | 11–1 | Malaysia | Moqi, China |
| 06:30 | Sahoo 1', 42'; Purnima 4', 17'; Dhan 8'; Krishna 14'; Sukhveer 21'; Geeta 28', 53'; Mane 43', 58' | Report | Nur 38' | Stadium: Moqi Training Base |

| 8 September 2026 2026 Junior Asia Cup Elite | Japan | 0–7 | India | Moqi, China |
| 10:30 | | Report | Krishna 5'; Supriya 9'; Purnima 14', 46'; Geeta 41', 45'; Mane 50' | Stadium: Moqi Training Base |

| 9 September 2026 2026 Junior Asia Cup Elite | China | 0–0 | India | Moqi, China |
| 16:30 | | Report | | Stadium: Moqi Training Base |

| 10 September 2026 2026 Junior Asia Cup Quarter final | India | 19–0 | Pakistan | Moqi, China |
| 09:45 | Puja 7'; Roshni 9', 60+'; Kadu 11'; Sukhveer 13'; Mane 13', 23'; Sidar 16', 39'; Geeta 18'; Toppo 25'; Malik 27', 49', 51'; Purnima 33'; Supriya 40', 54'; Krishna 48'; Dhan 55' | Report | | Stadium: Moqi Training Base |

| 12 September 2026 2026 Junior Asia Cup Semi final | India | 5–1 | South Korea | Moqi, China |
| 09:45 | Sidar 13'; Supriya 17', 33', 56'; Sukhveer 21' | Report | Jeong 41' | Stadium: Moqi Training Base |

| 13 September 2026 2026 Junior Asia Cup Gold medal match | India | 1–0 | China | Moqi, China |
| 14:00 | Mane 17' | Report | | Stadium: Moqi Training Base |

== Head-to-head record ==
| Won more matches than lost |
| All matches drawn |
| Won equal matches to lost |
| Lost more matches than won |

=== Overall record ===
Record last updated as of the following match:

India vs China at Moqi Training Base, Moqi in the 2026 Junior Asia Cup, 13 September 2026

| Opponent | GP | W | D | L | Win % | Last meeting |
|---|---|---|---|---|---|---|
| Argentina | 1 | 0 | 1 | 0 | 0% | 2005 |
| Australia | 4 | 1 | 1 | 2 | 25% | 2019 |
| Bangladesh | 1 | 1 | 0 | 0 | 100% | 2024 |
| Belarus | 1 | 1 | 0 | 0 | 100% | 2009 |
| Belgium | 2 | 0 | 0 | 2 | 0% | 2023 |
| Canada | 4 | 4 | 0 | 0 | 100% | 2023 |
| Chile | 3 | 2 | 0 | 1 | 66.67% | 2009 |
| China | 11 | 1 | 2 | 8 | 9.09% | 2026 |
| Chinese Taipei | 3 | 3 | 0 | 0 | 100% | 2023 |
| England | 6 | 1 | 3 | 2 | 16.67% | 2023 |
| Germany | 6 | 0 | 1 | 5 | 0% | 2025 |
| Ireland | 3 | 3 | 0 | 0 | 100% | 2025 |
| Japan | 11 | 8 | 1 | 2 | 72.73% | 2026 |
| Malaysia | 6 | 6 | 0 | 0 | 100% | 2026 |
| Namibia | 1 | 1 | 0 | 0 | 100% | 2025 |
| Netherlands | 3 | 0 | 0 | 3 | 0% | 2015 |
| New Zealand | 7 | 5 | 2 | 0 | 71.43% | 2023 |
| North Korea | 1 | 1 | 0 | 0 | 100% | 2015 |
| Pakistan | 1 | 1 | 0 | 0 | 100% | 2026 |
| Russia | 1 | 1 | 0 | 0 | 100% | 2013 |
| Scotland | 3 | 2 | 1 | 0 | 66.67% | 2019 |
| Singapore | 3 | 3 | 0 | 0 | 100% | 2015 |
| South Africa | 1 | 0 | 1 | 0 | 0% | 2005 |
| South Korea | 12 | 5 | 2 | 5 | 41.67% | 2026 |
| Spain | 5 | 4 | 0 | 1 | 80% | 2025 |
| Sri Lanka | 1 | 1 | 0 | 0 | 100% | 2012 |
| Thailand | 2 | 2 | 0 | 0 | 100% | 2024 |
| United States | 3 | 1 | 1 | 1 | 33.33% | 2023 |
| Uruguay | 1 | 0 | 1 | 0 | 0% | 2025 |
| Uzbekistan | 1 | 1 | 0 | 0 | 100% | 2023 |
| Wales | 3 | 3 | 0 | 0 | 100% | 2025 |

== See also ==
Indian national hockey teams
| Men's | | | | | Women's | | | | |
|---|---|---|---|---|---|---|---|---|---|
| Senior | Under-21 | Under-18 | Senior Hockey5s | Under-18 hockey5s | Senior | Under-21 | Under-18 | Senior Hockey5s | Under-18 hockey5s |

- Field hockey in India
- India national para hockey team
