= 2026 Women's Junior AHF Cup =

Field hockey tournament in Muscat, Oman

Tournament details
- Host country: Oman
- Dates: 12–18 July 2026
- Teams: 5 (from 1 confederation)
- Venue: Hockey Oman

Final positions
- Champions: Bangladesh (1st title)
- Runner-up: Kazakhstan
- Third place: Uzbekistan

Tournament statistics
- Matches played: 12
- Goals scored: 65 (5.42 per match)
- Top scorer: (Uzbekistan) Madinabonu Khujaeva (8 goals)
- Best player: (Kazakhstan) Zhanar Bektemissova
- Best goalkeeper: (Uzbekistan) Rushana Chorieva

The 2026 Women's Junior AHF Cup was the eighth edition of the Women's Junior AHF Cup, the biennial qualification tournament for the Women's Hockey Junior Asia Cup, organized by the Asian Hockey Federation. The tournament was held from 12 to 18 July 2026 at the Hockey Oman stadium in Muscat.

Chinese Taipei were the defending champions. Bangladesh won the tournament, beating Kazakhstan in the final.

== Venue ==
(Oman) Muscat
Hockey Oman Stadium
Capacity: 5,500

== Round robin ==
Pos	Team	Pld	W	D	L	GF	GA	GD	Pts	Qualification
1	Bangladesh	4	4	0	0	17	1	+16	12	Final
2	Kazakhstan	4	2	1	1	15	4	+11	7	Final
3	Uzbekistan	4	2	1	1	12	6	+6	7	Third place match
4	Hong Kong	4	1	0	3	4	17	−13	3	Third place match
5	Pakistan	4	0	0	4	4	24	−20	0	

Source: FIH
Rules for classification: 1) points; 2) matches won; 3) goal difference; 4) goals for; 5) head-to-head result; 6) field goals for.

All times are local (UTC+4).

12 July 2026
17:00

Bangladesh	6–0	Hong Kong
Riya 9', 54'; Ema 26', 33'; Rimon 28'; Akter 55'	Report

Umpires:
Mazin Al-Shukaili (OMA)
Ammar Rana (CAM)

12 July 2026
19:00

Kazakhstan	1–1	Uzbekistan
Nigmetzhanova 40'	Report	Khujaeva 11'

Umpires:
Deepa (IND)
Jannatul Ferdous (BAN)

13 July 2026
17:00

Pakistan	1–2	Hong Kong
Shariqa 40'	Report	Wong 4'; Tsang 19'

Umpires:
Deepa (IND)
Elyor Kholmirzaev (UZB)

13 July 2026
19:00

Bangladesh	1–0	Uzbekistan
Ema 50'	Report

Umpires:
Mazin Al-Shukaili (OMA)
Jacky Lee (HKG)

14 July 2026
17:00

Uzbekistan	6–1	Hong Kong
Abdugaforova 17'; Khujaeva 28', 31'; Mamatmurodova 43', 55'; Kuzieva 45'	Report	Chen 60+'

Umpires:
Mazin Al-Shukaili (OMA)
Nawar Al-Jabri (OMA)

14 July 2026
19:00

Kazakhstan	9–0	Pakistan
Bektemissova 7', 11', 24', 25'; Yeskendir 9', 58'; Kaiyrzhan 21'; Nigmetzhanova 29'; Aslankyzy 49'	Report

Umpires:
Jacky Lee (HKG)
Amna Al Jahhafi (OMA)

16 July 2026
17:00

Pakistan	0–8	Bangladesh
	Report	Rimon 4'; Oishi 15'; Ema 22', 39', 45'; Akter 26'; Riya 38'; Tisha 41'

Umpires:
Deepa (IND)
Aigerim Makhanova (KAZ)

16 July 2026
19:00

Hong Kong	1–4	Kazakhstan
Wong 25'	Report	Suleimen 8'; Aslankyzy 37'; Bektemissova 49', 56'

Umpires:
Elyor Kholmirzaev (UZB)
Ammar Rana (CAM)

17 July 2026
17:00

Pakistan	3–5	Uzbekistan
Shariqa 8', 53'; Sobia 16'	Report	Mamatmurodova 1'; Khujaeva 3', 52', 57'; Abdugaforova 14'

Umpires:
Jannatul Ferdous (BAN)
Nawar Al-Jabri (OMA)

17 July 2026
19:00

Kazakhstan	1–2	Bangladesh
Bektemissova 55'	Report	Rimon 16'; Riya 40'

Umpires:
Jacky Lee (HKG)
Amna Al Jahhafi (OMA)

== Third place match ==
18 July 2026
17:15

Uzbekistan	10–1	Hong Kong
Amrieva 11'; Olimova 15'; Mamatmurodova 20', 21'; Kuzieva 28'; Khabibulloeva 30'; Khujaeva 39', 47'; Soyibjonova 45'; Zaripova 48'	Report	S. Chen 55'

Umpires:
Deepa (IND)
Amna Al Jahhafi (OMA)

== Final ==
18 July 2026
19:15

Bangladesh	2–0	Kazakhstan
Riya 15'; Ema 19'	Report

Umpires:
Mazin Al-Shukaili (OMA)
Elyor Kholmirzaev (UZB)

== Final standings ==
Pos	Team	Qualification
1st place, gold medalist(s)	Bangladesh	2026 Junior Asia Cup
2nd place, silver medalist(s)	Kazakhstan	2026 Junior Asia Cup
3rd place, bronze medalist(s)	Uzbekistan	
4	Hong Kong	2026 Junior Asia Cup
5	Pakistan	2026 Junior Asia Cup

Source: FIH

== Goalscorers ==
There were 65 goals scored in 12 matches, for an average of 5.42 goals per match.

8 goals

- (Uzbekistan) Madinabonu Khujaeva

7 goals

- (Kazakhstan) Zhanar Bektemissova
- (Bangladesh) Nadira Ema

5 goals

- (Uzbekistan) Marjona Mamatmurodova
- (Bangladesh) Airin Riya

3 goals

- (Bangladesh) Sharika Rimon
- (Pakistan) Shariqa

2 goals

- (Uzbekistan) Mekhrangiz Abdugaforova
- (Bangladesh) Kona Akter
- (Kazakhstan) Gaukhar Aslankyzy
- (Uzbekistan) Mohigul Kuzieva
- (Kazakhstan) Dilnaz Nigmetzhanova
- (Hong Kong) Charlotte Sum Yu Wong
- (Kazakhstan) Khaua Yeskendir

1 goal

- (Uzbekistan) Mutabar Amrieva
- (Hong Kong) Pippa Gabriella Chen
- (Hong Kong) Sian Shu Chen
- (Kazakhstan) Akpeiil Kaiyrzhan
- (Uzbekistan) Sarvinoz Khabibulloeva
- (Bangladesh) Prionti Oishi
- (Uzbekistan) Noilakhon Olimova
- (Pakistan) Afzal Sobia
- (Uzbekistan) Roziyakhon Soyibjonova
- (Kazakhstan) Yerkezhan Suleimen
- (Bangladesh) Tasfiha Tisha
- (Hong Kong) Kyra Hei Ching Tsang
- (Uzbekistan) Shahzoda Zaripova

Source: FIH

== See also ==
- 2026 Men's Junior AHF Cup
