= 2024 Women's Junior AHF Cup =

Field hockey tournament

Tournament details
- Host country: Singapore
- Dates: 15–23 June 2024
- Teams: 7 (from 1 confederation)
- Venue: Sengkang Sports Centre

Final positions
- Champions: Chinese Taipei (4th title)
- Runner-up: Bangladesh
- Third place: Thailand

Tournament statistics
- Matches played: 21
- Goals scored: 128 (6.1 per match)
- Top scorer: (Thailand) Sudarat Noo-Keaw (14 goals)
- Best player: (Chinese Taipei) Huang Yu-Ting
- Best goalkeeper: (Thailand) Watsana Saetan

The 2024 Women's Junior AHF Cup was the seventh edition of the Women's Junior AHF Cup, the biennial qualification tournament for the Women's Hockey Junior Asia Cup, organized by the Asian Hockey Federation. The tournament was held from 14 to 23 June 2024 alongside the men's tournament at the Sengkang Sports Centre in Singapore.

The top five teams qualified for the 2024 Women's Hockey Junior Asia Cup. Kazakhstan were the defending champions but they did not enter in this year's tournament. Chinese Taipei won their fourth Women's Junior AHF Cup title by finishing first in the round-robin tournament, together with Bangladesh, Thailand, Sri Lanka and Hong Kong they qualified for the 2024 Asia Cup.

== Standings ==
Pos	Team	Pld	W	D	L	GF	GA	GD	Pts	Qualification
1	Chinese Taipei	6	6	0	0	45	1	+44	18	2024 Junior Asia Cup
2	Bangladesh	6	5	0	1	31	12	+19	15	2024 Junior Asia Cup
3	Thailand	6	4	0	2	26	12	+14	12	2024 Junior Asia Cup
4	Sri Lanka	6	3	0	3	11	30	−19	9	2024 Junior Asia Cup
5	Hong Kong	6	2	0	4	7	19	−12	6	2024 Junior Asia Cup
6	Singapore (H)	6	1	0	5	6	26	−20	3	
7	Indonesia	6	0	0	6	2	28	−26	0	

Source: FIH
Rules for classification: 1) points; 2) matches won; 3) goal difference; 4) goals for; 5) head-to-head result; 6) field goals for.
(H) Hosts

== Results ==
15 June 2024
09:00

Hong Kong	2–3	Sri Lanka
	Report

15 June 2024
09:30

Thailand	4–5	Bangladesh
	Report

15 June 2024
19:00

Singapore	3–0	Indonesia
	Report

16 June 2024
17:20

Thailand	7–0	Indonesia
	Report

16 June 2024
19:00

Chinese Taipei	10–1	Singapore
	Report

16 June 2024
19:30

Hong Kong	1–2	Bangladesh
	Report

17 June 2024
17:30

Chinese Taipei	12–0	Sri Lanka
	Report

18 June 2024
16:00

Hong Kong	1–0	Indonesia
	Report

18 June 2024
18:00

Bangladesh	7–2	Sri Lanka
	Report

18 June 2024
20:00

Thailand	4–0	Singapore
	Report

19 June 2024
17:30

Chinese Taipei	3–0	Bangladesh
	Report

19 June 2024
19:30

Hong Kong	0–4	Thailand
	Report

20 June 2024
15:30

Chinese Taipei	5–0	Indonesia
	Report

20 June 2024
19:00

Singapore	1–2	Sri Lanka
	Report

21 June 2024
17:00

Thailand	7–2	Sri Lanka
	Report

21 June 2024
19:00

Hong Kong	3–0	Singapore
	Report

22 June 2024
09:00

Indonesia	1–10	Bangladesh
	Report

22 June 2024
17:30

Chinese Taipei	5–0	Thailand
	Report

23 June 2024
09:30

Indonesia	1–2	Sri Lanka
	Report

23 June 2024
16:30

Singapore	1–7	Bangladesh
	Report

23 June 2024
17:30

Chinese Taipei	10–0	Hong Kong
	Report

== See also ==
- 2024 Men's Junior AHF Cup
