= Deepika Sehrawat =

Indian hockey player (born 2003)

Personal information
- Born: Deepika Sehrawat; 6 December 2003 (age 22) Hisar, Haryana, India

Sport
- Sport: Field hockey
- Position: Forward
Senior career
Years	Team	Caps	Goals
2019–	Indian Oil	-	-
2025–	Delhi SG Pipers	-	-
National team
Years	Team	Caps	Goals
2018	India U18 Hockey5s	5	(4)
2019–2024	India U21	22	(20)
2022–	India	82	(60)
Medal record
Women's field hockey
Representing India
Asian Games
Gold medal – first place	2026 Aichi–Nagoya	Team
Bronze medal – third place	2022 Hangzhou	Team
Asian Champions Trophy
Gold medal – first place	2023 Ranchi	Team
Gold medal – first place	2024 Rajgir	Team
Junior Asia Cup
Gold medal – first place	2023 Japan	Team
Gold medal – first place	2024 Muscat	Team

Deepika Sehrawat (born 6 December 2003) is an Indian field hockey player and member of the national team. She was a part of the bronze medal-winning team at the 2022 Asian Games and gold-medal winning team at the 2026 Asian Games. She plays as a forward and specialises in drag-flicks.

== Early life ==
Deepika started as wrestler and used to practice along with her brother. One day in 2012, on way to wrestling practice she picked up a hockey stick for fun and soon it became her mainstay.

== Career ==
Deepika first came to limelight with a stellar performance in the 2018 Sub-Junior National Championships in her hometown Hisar, where she scored 16 goals for Haryana. Haryana went to win the Sun-Junior Nationals and Deepika was adjudged as the 'Best Player' of the tournament. Then she was called for the National camp and was selected for the Indian team for the Youth Olympic qualifier. She made her junior debut for the country in 2018 at the Youth Olympic Qualifiers in April 2018. In 2020, she was part of the Junior India women's tour of Chile where she played a key role in the Indian team's unbeaten run. Later she also took part in the 2021 Junior World Cup in Potchefstroom, South Africa and was part of the Indian team that won gold at the 2023 Junior Asia Cup. She made her debut for Senior India in the 2021–22 Women's FIH Pro League held in Bhubaneswar, Odisha. She scored eight goals against Uzbekistan in a Pool B match at the 2026 Asian Games to set up a new international record of highest goals by a woman player in a single match at the Games. She broke her own record by scoring 9 in a match against Thailand.

== Awards and nominations ==
Year	Award	Category	Result	Ref.
2025	Hockey India Awards	Upcoming Player of the Year Female	Won	
