= 2019 Women's Junior AHF Cup =

Field hockey tournament

AirAsia Women's Junior AHF Cup 2019

Tournament details
- Host country: Singapore
- Dates: 9–15 September
- Teams: 6 (from 1 confederation)
- Venue: Sengkang Hockey Stadium

Final positions
- Champions: Singapore (1st title)
- Runner-up: Uzbekistan
- Third place: Chinese Taipei

Tournament statistics
- Matches played: 62
- Goals scored: 15 (0.24 per match)
- Top scorer(s): (Singapore) Hajarith Johana (Uzbekistan) Zulfiyakhon Khasanboeva (6 goals)
- Best player: (Uzbekistan) Sabina Adizova

The 2019 Women's Junior AHF Cup, also known as the AirAsia Women's Junior AHF Cup 2019 due to sponsorship reasons, was the fifth edition of the Women's Junior AHF Cup.

It was held at the Sengkang Hockey Stadium in Singapore from 9 to 15 September 2019. The top two teams qualified for the 2021 Junior Asia Cup.

The hosts Singapore won the tournament for the first time by finishing first in the round-robin tournament.

== Results ==
Al times are local (UTC+8).

=== Pool ===
| Pos | Team | Pld | W | D | L | GF | GA | GD | Pts | Qualification |
|---|---|---|---|---|---|---|---|---|---|---|
| 1 | Singapore (H) | 5 | 4 | 1 | 0 | 18 | 1 | +17 | 13 | 2021 Junior Asia Cup |
| 2 | Uzbekistan | 5 | 3 | 1 | 1 | 21 | 3 | +18 | 10 | 2021 Junior Asia Cup |
| 3 | Chinese Taipei | 5 | 3 | 1 | 1 | 14 | 8 | +6 | 10 | |
| 4 | Hong Kong | 5 | 2 | 1 | 2 | 4 | 7 | −3 | 7 | |
| 5 | Bangladesh | 5 | 1 | 0 | 4 | 4 | 14 | −10 | 3 | |
| 6 | Sri Lanka | 5 | 0 | 0 | 5 | 1 | 29 | −28 | 0 | |

Source: FIH
Rules for classification: 1) points; 2) matches won; 3) goal difference; 4) goals for; 5) head-to-head result; 6) field goals scored.
(H) Hosts

=== Fixtures ===
9 September 2019
18:00

| Hong Kong | 0–5 | Uzbekistan |
|---|---|---|
| | Report |

9 September 2019
18:30

| Sri Lanka | 0–6 | Chinese Taipei |
|---|---|---|
| | Report |

9 September 2019
20:00

| Singapore | 3–0 | Bangladesh |
|---|---|---|
| | Report |

10 September 2019
18:00

| Bangladesh | 2–0 | Sri Lanka |
|---|---|---|
| | Report |

10 September 2019
18:30

| Hong Kong | 0–2 | Chinese Taipei |
|---|---|---|
| | Report |

10 September 2019
20:00

| Singapore | 1–0 | Uzbekistan |
|---|---|---|
| | Report |

12 September 2019
18:00

| Chinese Taipei | 2–2 | Uzbekistan |
|---|---|---|
| | Report |

12 September 2019
18:30

| Bangladesh | 0–1 | Hong Kong |
|---|---|---|
| | Report |

12 September 2019
20:00

| Sri Lanka | 1–10 | Singapore |
|---|---|---|
| | Report |

14 September 2019
16:00

| Sri Lanka | 0–3 | Hong Kong |
|---|---|---|
| | Report |

14 September 2019
16:30

| Uzbekistan | 6–0 | Bangladesh |
|---|---|---|
| | Report |

14 September 2019
18:00

| Singapore | 4–0 | Chinese Taipei |
|---|---|---|
| | Report |

15 September 2019
16:00

| Chinese Taipei | 4–2 | Bangladesh |
|---|---|---|
| | Report |

15 September 2019
16:30

| Uzbekistan | 8–0 | Sri Lanka |
|---|---|---|
| | Report |

15 September 2019
18:00

| Hong Kong | 0–0 | Singapore |
|---|---|---|
| | Report |

== See also ==
- 2019 Men's Junior AHF Cup
