= 2022 Women's Junior AHF Cup =

Field hockey tournament

Tournament details
- Host country: Kazakhstan
- City: Taldykorgan
- Dates: 12–20 October
- Teams: 6 (from 1 confederation)
- Venue: Taldykorgan Hockey Stadium

Final positions
- Champions: Kazakhstan (1st title)
- Runner-up: Chinese Taipei
- Third place: Uzbekistan

Tournament statistics
- Matches played: 18
- Goals scored: 147 (8.17 per match)
- Top scorer: (Chinese Taipei) Huang Yi-chun (12 goals)
- Best player: (Chinese Taipei) Wang Yu-chiu
- Best goalkeeper: (Kazakhstan) Dilnaz Olzhabayeva

The 2022 Women's Junior AHF Cup was the sixth edition of the Women's Junior AHF Cup, the biennial qualification tournament for the Women's Hockey Junior Asia Cup, organized by the Asian Hockey Federation. It was held at the Taldykorgan Hockey Stadium in Taldykorgan, Kazakhstan from 12 to 20 October 2022.

The top five teams qualified for the 2023 Junior Asia Cup.

== Preliminary round ==
=== Standings ===
Pos	Team	Pld	W	D	L	GF	GA	GD	Pts	Qualification
1	Chinese Taipei	5	5	0	0	37	4	+33	15	Final
2	Kazakhstan (H)	5	4	0	1	32	2	+30	12	Final
3	Indonesia	5	2	1	2	18	11	+7	7	Third place game
4	Uzbekistan	5	1	2	2	25	7	+18	5	Third place game
5	Hong Kong	5	1	1	3	15	15	0	4	Fifth place game
6	Tajikistan	5	0	0	5	0	88	−88	0	Fifth place game

Source: FIH
Rules for classification: 1) points; 2) matches won; 3) goal difference; 4) goals for; 5) head-to-head result; 6) field goals for.
(H) Hosts

=== Results ===
12 October 2022
11:00

Hong Kong	1–3	Indonesia
	Report

12 October 2022
13:15

Chinese Taipei	4–1	Uzbekistan
	Report

12 October 2022
15:30

Kazakhstan	18–0	Tajikistan
	Report

13 October 2022
11:00

Hong Kong	0–0	Uzbekistan
	Report

13 October 2022
13:15

Tajikistan	0–22	Chinese Taipei
	Report

13 October 2022
15:30

Kazakhstan	5–0	Indonesia
	Report

15 October 2022
11:00

Uzbekistan	1–1	Indonesia
	Report

15 October 2022
13:15

Tajikistan	0–12	Hong Kong
	Report

15 October 2022
15:30

Chinese Taipei	2–0	Kazakhstan
	Report

17 October 2022
11:00

Indonesia	1–4	Chinese Taipei
	Report

17 October 2022
13:15

Uzbekistan	23–0	Tajikistan
	Report

17 October 2022
15:30

Hong Kong	0–7	Kazakhstan
	Report

19 October 2022
11:00

Chinese Taipei	5–2	Hong Kong
	Report

19 October 2022
13:15

Indonesia	13–0	Tajikistan
	Report

19 October 2022
15:30

Kazakhstan	2–0	Uzbekistan
	Report

== Classification round ==
=== Fifth and sixth place ===
20 October 2022
10:30

Hong Kong	8–0	Tajikistan
	Report

=== Third and fourth place ===
20 October 2022
13:00

Indonesia	1–2	Uzbekistan
	Report

=== Final ===
20 October 2022
15:30

Chinese Taipei	2–7	Kazakhstan
	Report

== Final standings ==
Pos	Team	Qualification
1	Kazakhstan (H)	2023 Junior Asia Cup
2	Chinese Taipei	2023 Junior Asia Cup
3	Uzbekistan	2023 Junior Asia Cup
4	Indonesia	2023 Junior Asia Cup
5	Hong Kong	2023 Junior Asia Cup
6	Tajikistan	

Source: FIH
(H) Host

== See also ==
- 2023 Men's Junior AHF Cup
