= 2015 Women's Hockey Junior Asia Cup =

Field hockey tournament

2015 Women's Junior Asian Cup
Tournament details
- Host country: China
- City: Changzhou
- Dates: 5–13 September
- Teams: 9 (from 1 confederation)

Final positions
- Champions: China (3rd title)
- Runner-up: Japan
- Third place: South Korea

Tournament statistics
- Matches played: 23
- Goals scored: 151 (6.57 per match)
- Top scorer: (China) Gu Bingfeng (11 goals)

The 2015 Women's Hockey Junior Asia Cup was a field hockey tournament held in Changzhou, China between 5 – 13 September 2015.

The tournament served as a qualifier for the 2016 Women's Hockey Junior World Cup, held in Santiago, Chile in November and December 2016.

China won the tournament by defeating Japan 3–1 in a shoot-out, after the final finished a 2–2 draw. South Korea won the bronze medal by defeating India 3–2 in the third and fourth place playoff.

== Teams ==
The following Under 21 teams from the Asian Hockey Federation competed in the tournament.

- China
- Chinese Taipei
- India
- Japan
- Malaysia
- North Korea
- Singapore
- South Korea
- Thailand

== Results ==
=== Preliminary round ===
==== Pool A ====
Pos	Team	Pld	W	D	L	GF	GA	GD	Pts	Qualification
1	China (H)	4	4	0	0	26	2	+24	12	Semi-finals
2	India	4	3	0	1	36	5	+31	9	Semi-finals
3	Malaysia	4	2	0	2	6	15	−9	6	
4	North Korea	4	1	0	3	6	27	−21	3	
5	Singapore	4	0	0	4	0	25	−25	0	

Source: FIH
Rules for classification: 1) points; 2) goal difference; 3) goals scored; 4) head-to-head result.
(H) Hosts

5 September 2015
15:00

Malaysia	2–0	Singapore
Hanis 10'; Safiqah 50'	Report

Umpires:
Junko Wagatsuma (JPN)
Choi Eun-young (KOR)

5 September 2015
15:30

India	13–0	North Korea
Dubey 11', 64'; Jaspreet 20'; Navneet 24', 70+'; Rampal 28', 43', 44', 46', 52'; Mayengbam 31'; P. Barla 34'; Minz 51'	Report

Umpires:
Ornpimol Kittiteerasopon (THA)
Petrina de Souza (SGP)

6 September 2015
17:00

India	12–0	Singapore
P. Barla 7'; A. Barla 10', 68'; Dubey 15', 64'; Jaspreet 25'; Mayengbam 49', 65'; Gurjit 52'; Minz 59'; Navneet 61'; Ekka 70'	Report

Umpires:
Ornpimol Kittiteerasopon (THA)
Norasyikin Shariudin (MAS)

6 September 2015
19:15

China	11–0	North Korea
Cai 1'; Gu 7', 36', 56', 67'; Zhang 29'; Li 35', 41'; Zhong M. 44'; Guo C. 60'; Zhong J. 64'	Report

Umpires:
Junko Wagatsuma (JPN)
Binish Hayat (PAK)

7 September 2015
19:15

Malaysia	0–4	China
	Report	Gu 34'; Li 35'; Shan 66'; Yuan 69'

Umpires:
Binish Hayat (PAK)
Celine Martin-Schmets (BEL)

8 September 2015
17:00

Singapore	0–4	North Korea
	Report	Ryang Il-sim 19', 24', 38', 65'

Umpires:
Suman Chumbuk (IND)
Choi Eun-young (KOR)

9 September 2015
17:00

North Korea	2–3	Malaysia
Pak Un-hyang 3', 67'	Report	Nuraslinda 30', 65'; Fatin 59'

Umpires:
Ornpimol Kittiteerasopon (THA)
Junko Wagatsuma (JPN)

9 September 2015
19:15

India	2–4	China
Jaspreet 33'; Gurjit 56'	Report	Gu 10', 11'; Guo Q. 15'; Guo C. 50'

Umpires:
Annelize Rostron (RSA)
Celine Martin-Schmets (BEL)

10 September 2015
17:15

Malaysia	1–9	India
Norfaiezah 32'	Report	Rampal 8', 37', 42'; Jaspreet 15', 60'; Dubey 29'; Ekka 39'; Navneet 41'; P. Barla 51'

Umpires:
Tian Yimiao (CHN)
Binish Hayat (PAK)

10 September 2015
19:30

China	7–0	Singapore
Zhong M. 4'; Ou 16', 28'; Shan 20'; Gu 48', 67'; Zhong J. 59'	Report

Umpires:
Junko Wagatsuma (JPN)
Choi Eun-young (KOR)

==== Pool B ====
Pos	Team	Pld	W	D	L	GF	GA	GD	Pts	Qualification
1	Japan	3	3	0	0	31	1	+30	9	Semi-finals
2	South Korea	3	2	0	1	20	3	+17	6	Semi-finals
3	Thailand	3	1	0	2	3	21	−18	3	
4	Chinese Taipei	3	0	0	3	2	31	−29	0	

Source: FIH
Rules for classification: 1) points; 2) goal difference; 3) goals scored; 4) head-to-head result.

5 September 2015
17:15

Japan	16–0	Chinese Taipei
Mori 15', 62', 70'; Matsumoto 26'; Hirahara 33', 50'; Nagai 39', 61'; Asai 41'; Mano 43'; Kawamura 47', 58', 64'; Segawa 53'; Karino 60', 65'	Report

Umpires:
Celine Martin-Schmets (BEL)
Choe Kwang-suk (PRK)

5 September 2015
19:30

South Korea	7–0	Thailand
Baek Ee-seul 4'; Lee Min-ji 10'; Lee Yu-rim 13', 46'; Park Mi-rim 27'; Lee Yu-ri 39'; Kim Min-ji 50'	Report

Umpires:
Annelize Rostron (RSA)
Suman Chumbuk (IND)

7 September 2015
17:00

Japan	3–1	South Korea
Asai 26', 69'; Kawamura 28'	Report	Baek Ee-seul 63'

Umpires:
Annelize Rostron (BEL)
Tian Yimiao (CHN)

8 September 2015
19:15

Thailand	3–2	Chinese Taipei
Sanpoung 9', 49', 70'	Report	Yang Chia-yu 5'; Wu Huang-yu 29'

Umpires:
Norasyikin Shariudin (MAS)
Tian Yimiao (CHN)

10 September 2015
15:00

Thailand	0–12	Japan
	Report	Segawa 5'; Mano 6', 11', 43'; Hirahara 12'; Nagai 25', 37'; Yagi 32'; Mori 32', 66'; Matsumoto 41'; Karino 47'

Umpires:
Norasyikin Shariudin (MAS)
Choe Kwang-suk (PRK)

10 September 2015
15:30

South Korea	12–0	Chinese Taipei
Kim Min-ji 11'; Baek Ee-seul 23', 40', 65'; Kim Min-yeong 35+', 47'; Cho Hye-jin 37', 70'; Lee Yu-rim 38', 49'; Lee Min-ji 42'; Park Mi-rim 63'	Report

Umpires:
Petrina de Souza (SGP)
Suman Chumbuk (IND)

=== Classification round ===
==== Fifth to ninth place classification ====
===== Seventh to ninth place =====
Playoff
12 September 2015
Singapore	1
Chinese Taipei	0

Seventh and eighth place
13 September 2015
Singapore	1 (1)
North Korea (p.s.o)	1 (3)

====== Playoff ======
12 September 2015
14:00

Singapore	1–0	Chinese Taipei
T. Ong 39'	Report

Umpires:
Choi Eun-young (KOR)
Norasyikin Shariudin (MAS)

====== Seventh and eighth place ======
13 September 2015
16:30

Singapore	1–1	North Korea
R. Sanip 65'	Report	Ryang Il-sim 50'
Penalties
T. Ong (penalty shoot-out missed); R. Sanip (penalty shoot-out missed); S. Sanip (penalty shoot-out scored); Wong (penalty shoot-out missed)	1–3	(penalty shoot-out scored) Pak Un-hyang; (penalty shoot-out missed) Kang Ok-yong; (penalty shoot-out scored) Ryang Il-sim; (penalty shoot-out scored) Ri Yong-ok

Umpires:
Tian Yimiao (CHN)
Suman Chumbak (IND)

===== Fifth and sixth place =====
12 September 2015
16:15

Malaysia	3–1	Thailand
Hanis 22', 35'; Fatin 56'	Report	Sanpoung 47'

Umpires:
Tian Yimiao (CHN)
Suman Chumbak (CHN)

==== First to fourth place classification ====
Semi-finals
12 September 2015
China	1
South Korea	0
12 September 2015
Japan (p.s.o)	2 (3)
India	2 (2)

Final
13 September 2015
China (p.s.o)	2 (3)
Japan	2 (1)
Third place
13 September 2015
South Korea	3
India	2

===== Semi-finals =====
12 September 2015
15:00

China	1–0	South Korea
Zhong M. 56'	Report

Umpires:
Annelize Rostron (RSA)
Binish Hayat (PAK)

12 September 2015
17:30

Japan	2–2	India
Mano 18'; Hirahara 57'	Report	Ekka 4'; Yadav 25'
Penalties
Mano (penalty shoot-out scored); Kawamura (penalty shoot-out missed); Matsumoto (penalty shoot-out missed); Mori (penalty shoot-out scored); Nagai (penalty shoot-out scored)	3–2	(penalty shoot-out scored) Navjot; (penalty shoot-out scored) Dubey; (penalty shoot-out missed) Navneet; (penalty shoot-out missed) Ekka; (penalty shoot-out missed) Rampal

Umpires:
Celine Martin-Schmets (BEL)
Ornpimol Kittiteerasopon (THA)

===== Third and fourth place =====
13 September 2015
16:00

South Korea	3–2	India
Baek Ee-seul 29'; Lee Min-ji 66'; Cho Hye-jin 68'	Report	Toppo 19'; Minz 38'

Umpires:
Celine Martin-Schmets (BEL)
Junko Wagatsuma (JPN)

===== Final =====
13 September 2015
18:30

China	2–2	Japan
Gu 4', 40'	Report	Yagi 15'; Mano 60'
Penalties
Gu (penalty shoot-out scored); Yuan (penalty shoot-out scored); Zhong M. (penalty shoot-out scored)	3–1	(penalty shoot-out scored) Mano; (penalty shoot-out missed) Kawamura; (penalty shoot-out missed) Mori; (penalty shoot-out missed) Nagai

Umpires:
Annelize Rostron (RSA)
Ornpimol Kittiteerasopon (THA)

== Statistics ==
=== Final rankings ===
As per statistical convention in field hockey, matches decided in extra time are counted as wins and losses, while matches decided by penalty shoot-outs are counted as draws.

Pos	Team	Pld	W	D	L	GF	GA	GD	Pts	Final result
1st place, gold medalist(s)	China	6	5	1	0	29	4	+25	16	Gold Medal
2nd place, silver medalist(s)	Japan	5	3	2	0	35	5	+30	11	Silver Medal
3rd place, bronze medalist(s)	South Korea	5	3	0	2	23	6	+17	9	Bronze Medal
4	India	6	3	1	2	40	10	+30	10	Fourth place
5	Malaysia	5	3	0	2	9	16	−7	9	Fifth place
6	Thailand	4	1	0	3	4	24	−20	3	Sixth place
7	North Korea	5	1	1	3	7	28	−21	4	Seventh place
8	Singapore	6	1	1	4	2	26	−24	4	Eighth place
9	Chinese Taipei	4	0	0	4	2	32	−30	0	Ninth place

Source: FIH
