= Natsuha Matsumoto =

Japanese field hockey player

Personal information
- Born: 31 July 1995 (age 31)

Sport
- Sport: Field hockey
- Position: Defender
- Club: Coca-Cola Red Sparks
National team
Years	Team	Caps	Goals
–	Japan		-
Medal record
Asia Cup
Gold medal – first place	2022 Muscat
Asian Champions Trophy
Gold medal – first place	2021 Donghae

Natsuha Matsumoto is a Japanese field hockey player for the Japanese national team.
