= 2027 Women's FIH Hockey Junior World Cup =

12th edition of the Women's FIH Hockey Junior World Cup

Tournament details
- Host country: TBD
- Teams: 24 (from 5 confederations)

The 2027 Women's FIH Hockey Junior World Cup will be the 12th edition of the Women's FIH Hockey Junior World Cup, the biennial women's under-21 field hockey world championship organised by the International Hockey Federation. The tournament will feature 24 teams.

Netherlands are the defending champions who won the 2025 title after defeating Argentina by 2–1.

== Qualification ==
Under the qualification system, one place is reserved for the host nation, while 15 places are allocated to the top three teams from each of the five continental championships: Africa, Asia, Europe, Pan America and Oceania. The remaining eight places are allocated through continental quotas determined by the respective FIH Junior World Rankings as of 31 January 2026, with those places filled by the highest-placed teams not already qualified in the relevant continental championships.

As only Australia and New Zealand entered the 2026 Oceania qualifiers, their third allocated place will be allocated to the continent of the highest-placed team in the FIH Junior World Rankings not yet qualified through the FIH junior world ranking system.

France qualified for the tournament since their last appearance in 2016. Czechia will play their first ever World Cup tournament.

=== Qualified teams ===
Dates	Event	Location	Quotas	Qualifier(s)	Appearance(s)				Previous best performance
Dates	Event	Location	Quotas	Qualifier(s)	Total	First	Last	Streak	Previous best performance
	Hosts	—N/a	1						
6–18 April 2026	2026 Junior Pan American Cup	Santiago, Chile	5	Argentina	12	1989	2025	12	Champions (1993, 2016)
6–18 April 2026	2026 Junior Pan American Cup	Santiago, Chile	5	Canada	10	1989	2025	4	7th (1989)
6–18 April 2026	2026 Junior Pan American Cup	Santiago, Chile	5	Chile	8	1989	2025	3	10th (2005)
6–18 April 2026	2026 Junior Pan American Cup	Santiago, Chile	5	United States	11	1989	2025	10	6th (2025)
6–18 April 2026	2026 Junior Pan American Cup	Santiago, Chile	5	Uruguay	3	2022	2025	2	12th (2025)
26 July – 1 August 2026	2026 EuroHockey U21 Championship	Valencia, Spain	7	Belgium	5	2013	2025	3	3rd (2023, 2025)
26 July – 1 August 2026	2026 EuroHockey U21 Championship	Valencia, Spain	7	England	12	1989	2025	12	3rd (2022)
26 July – 1 August 2026	2026 EuroHockey U21 Championship	Valencia, Spain	7	Germany	12	1989	2025	12	Champions (1989)
26 July – 1 August 2026	2026 EuroHockey U21 Championship	Valencia, Spain	7	Ireland	3	2022	2025	2	9th (2022)
26 July – 1 August 2026	2026 EuroHockey U21 Championship	Valencia, Spain	7	Netherlands	12	1989	2025	12	Champions (1997, 2009, 2013, 2022, 2023, 2025)
26 July – 1 August 2026	2026 EuroHockey U21 Championship	Valencia, Spain	7	Scotland	4	1993	2025	2	11th (1993)
26 July – 1 August 2026	2026 EuroHockey U21 Championship	Valencia, Spain	7	Spain	10	1993	2025	3	4th (2016)
27 July – 1 August 2026	2026 EuroHockey U21 Championship II	Salon-de-Provence, France	1	France	3	2009	2016	1	14th (2009)
27 July – 1 August 2026	2026 EuroHockey U21 Championship II	Vienna, Austria	1	Czechia	1	Debut			
4–13 September 2026	2026 Junior Asia Cup	Moqi, China	4	China	9	1989	2025	2	4th (2025)
4–13 September 2026	2026 Junior Asia Cup	Moqi, China	4	India	8	2001	2025	4	3rd (2013)
4–13 September 2026	2026 Junior Asia Cup	Moqi, China	4	Japan	4	2016	2025	2	7th (2023)
4–13 September 2026	2026 Junior Asia Cup	Moqi, China	4	South Korea	12	1989	2025	12	Champions (2001, 2005)
1–4 October 2026	2026 Junior Oceania Cup	Redcliffe, Australia	2	Australia	10	1993	2025	3	Runners-up (1993, 1997)
1–4 October 2026	2026 Junior Oceania Cup	Redcliffe, Australia	2	New Zealand	8	1989	2025	3	5th (2001)
22–30 January 2027	2027 Junior Africa Cup	Nairobi, Kenya	3	TBD1					
22–30 January 2027	2027 Junior Africa Cup	Nairobi, Kenya	3	TBD2					
22–30 January 2027	2027 Junior Africa Cup	Nairobi, Kenya	3	TBD3					
Total			24						

== Squads ==
Players born on or after 1 January 2006 will be eligible to compete in the tournament. All players shall be at least 15 years of age by 1st January of 2027.
