= Wang Lihang =

Chinese field hockey player

Personal information
- Born: 28 March 2007 (age 19) Liaoning Province, China

Sport
- Sport: Field hockey
- Position: Forward
- Club: Liaoning
National team
Years	Team	Caps	Goals
2024–	China	9	(3)
2024–	China U–21	6	(7)
Medal record
Women's field hockey
Representing China
Asian Champions Trophy
Silver medal – second place	2024 Rajgir
Junior Asian Cup
Silver medal – second place	2024 Muscat

Wang Lihang (王立航, born 28 March 2007) is a field hockey player from China.

== Personal life ==
Wang was born in the Liaoning Province.

== Career ==
=== Under–21 ===
In 2024, Wang made her debut for the Chinese U–21 team. She was a member of the squad at the Junior Asian Cup in Muscat. At the tournament she won a silver medal and finished as China's equal highest scorer, with seven goals.

She has been named in the squad for the 2025 FIH Junior World Cup in Santiago.

=== Senior national team ===
Prior to making her junior debut, Wang made her senior international for China. She was a member of the silver medal-winning squad at the 2024 Asian Champions Trophy in Rajgir. She has also made appearances throughout the 2024–25 FIH Pro League.
