= Malaysia women's national under-21 field hockey team =

Malaysia
- Association: Malaysian Women's Hockey Association (MWHA)
- Head Coach: Nasihin Ibrahim
- Captain: Nurmaizatulhanim Syafi

Junior World Cup
- Appearances: 2 (first in 2022)
- Best result: 11th

The Malaysia women's national under-21 field hockey team represents Malaysia in international field hockey matches and tournaments.

== Competitive record ==
=== Junior Hockey World Cup ===
- 2022 – 11th
- 2025 – 22nd
- 2027 – DNQ

=== Junior Asia Cup ===
- 1992 – 5th
- 1996 – 5th
- 2000 – 6th
- 2008 – 5th
- 2012 – 5th
- 2015 – 5th
- 2021 – Cancelled
- 2023 – 5th
- 2024 – 5th
- 2026 – 6th

== Players ==
The following squad was announced for 2026 Women's Hockey Junior Asia Cup:

1. Nur Ellysha Najwa(GK)
2. Damia Jasman
3. Nurdini Ridzuan
4. Nur Ridzuan(C)
5. Nurul Adnan
6. Rohaizatul Alisha
7. Aqhinatul Hashmi
8. Nur Azli
10. Ainnur Insyirah
11. Nur Mohd
14. Nur Safiya Maisara
15. Nurfitrah Shamsudin
16. Nur Amira Batrisya(GK)
17. Nur Rasyiqah Adawiah
18. Valerina
19. Nurain Atiqah
20. Irdina Jeffrey
21. Anis Nabilah
22. Khaleesya Khairul
23. Natashanajwa Nasharuddin

== See also ==
- Malaysia men's national field hockey team
- Malaysia women's national field hockey team
- Malaysia men's national under-21 field hockey team
