= Mohamed Nasihin Nubil Ibrahim =

Malaysian field hockey player (born 1975)

Personal information
- Nationality: Malaysian
- Born: 27 April 1975 (age 50)

Sport
- Sport: Field hockey

Mohamed Nasihin Nubil Ibrahim (born 27 April 1975) is a Malaysian field hockey player. He competed at the 1996 Summer Olympics and the 2000 Summer Olympics.
