= 2024 Women's Hockey Junior Asia Cup =

Field hockey competition

Tournament details
- Host country: Oman
- City: Muscat
- Dates: 7–15 December
- Teams: 10 (from 1 confederation)
- Venue: Hockey Oman Stadium

Final positions
- Champions: India (2nd title)
- Runner-up: China
- Third place: South Korea

Tournament statistics
- Matches played: 29
- Goals scored: 206 (7.1 per match)
- Top scorer: (India) Deepika Sehrawat (12 goals)

The 2024 Women's Hockey Junior Asia Cup was the ninth edition of the Women's Hockey Junior Asia Cup, the women's international under-21 field hockey championship of Asia, organized by the Asian Hockey Federation. It was held from 7 to 15 December 2024 at the Hockey Oman Stadium in Muscat, Oman.

India were the defending champions. They defended their title and won their second title by defeating China 3–2 in a shoot-out after the final finished 1–1 in regular time. South Korea won the bronze medal by defeating Japan 3–2 in a shoot-out after the third place match also finished 1–1 in regular time.

The tournament served as the Asian qualifier for the 2025 Women's FIH Hockey Junior World Cup, with the five highest-ranked teams qualifying. India, China, South Korea, Japan and Malaysia secured the five qualifying spots.

== Qualification ==
The five highest-ranked teams from the 2023 Junior Asia Cup qualified directly for this edition. The other teams participated in the 2024 Women's Junior AHF Cup, where the top five qualified for the 2024 Junior Asia Cup.

=== Qualified teams ===
The following ten teams participated in the 2024 Junior Asia Cup.

Dates	Event	Location	Quotas	Qualifiers
3–11 June 2023	2023 Junior Asia Cup	Kakamigahara, Japan	5	China; India; Japan; Malaysia; South Korea
15–23 June 2024	2024 Junior AHF Cup	Singapore	5	Bangladesh; Chinese Taipei; Hong Kong; Sri Lanka; Thailand
Total			10	

== Preliminary round ==
All times are local (UTC+4).

=== Pool A ===
Pos	Team	Pld	W	D	L	GF	GA	GD	Pts	Qualification
1	China	4	4	0	0	33	1	+32	12	Semi-finals and 2025 Junior World Cup
2	India	4	3	0	1	28	3	+25	9	Semi-finals and 2025 Junior World Cup
3	Malaysia	4	2	0	2	9	10	−1	6	
4	Thailand	4	1	0	3	2	21	−19	3	
5	Bangladesh	4	0	0	4	3	40	−37	0	

Source: FIH
Rules for classification: 1) points; 2) matches won; 3) goal difference; 4) goals for; 5) head-to-head result; 6) field goals for.

7 December 2024
12:15

China	19–0	Bangladesh
Tan J. 2'; Wang L. 4', 25', 26', 47'; Ma Xi. 5'; Liang W. 7', 39'; Hao G. 9', 26', 33', 41', 55'; Liu T. 10'; Zou L. 29', 34'; Li J. 53'; Lei J. 54'; Zeng Xu. 59'	Report

Umpires:
Shivani Sharma (IND)
Shahiela Johari (MAS)

7 December 2024
14:30

Malaysia	3–0	Thailand
Azureen 9'; Syahirah 31'; Nazihah 54'	Report

Umpires:
Jang Heesun (KOR)
See Rinky (HKG)

8 December 2024
12:15

China	8–0	Thailand
Li J. 23'; Ma Xu. 34'; Tan J. 39'; Wang L. 40'; Ma Xi. 42'; Liang W. 47'; Zou L. 55'; Feng 59'	Report

Umpires:
Khamis Al Balushi (OMA)
Shiroma Athurupana (SRI)

8 December 2024
19:00

India	13–1	Bangladesh
Deepika 7', 20', 55'; Manisha 10'; Kanika 12', 51', 51'; Mumtaz 27', 32', 53', 58'; Beauty 33'; Sakshi 43'	Report	Pal 12'

Umpires:
Wassana Pankemthong (THA)
Mazin Al-Shukaili (OMA)

9 December 2024
19:00

Malaysia	0–5	India
	Report	Vaishnavi 32'; Deepika 37', 39', 48'; Kanika 38'

Umpires:
Sharne Mayers (ZIM)
Qiu Fang (CHN)

10 December 2024
19:00

Thailand	2–1	Bangladesh
Noo-Keaw 3', 31'	Report	Ema 12'

Umpires:
See Rinky (HKG)
Shiroma Athurupana (SRI)

11 December 2024
16:45

Bangladesh	1–6	Malaysia
Pal 49'	Report	Alyani 8', 30', 41'; Adawiyah 44'; Azureen 45'; Syakirah 53'

Umpires:
Mazin Al-Shukaili (OMA)
Sharne Mayers (ZIM)

11 December 2024
19:00

China	2–1	India
Tan J. 32'; Wang L. 42'	Report	Deepika 56'

Umpires:
Jang Heesun (KOR)
Minami Inamoto (JPN)

12 December 2024
16:45

Malaysia	0–4	China
	Report	Hao 4', 17'; Lei 49'; Ma Xi. 54'

Umpires:
Binish Hayat (PAK)
Sharne Mayers (ZIM)

12 December 2024
19:00

India	9–0	Thailand
Sakshi 17'; Kanika 23', 25', 40'; Lalrinpuii 27'; Deepika 28', 31', 35', 55'	Report

Umpires:
Mazin Al-Shukaili (OMA)
Shiroma Athurupana (SRI)

=== Pool B ===
Pos	Team	Pld	W	D	L	GF	GA	GD	Pts	Qualification
1	Japan	4	4	0	0	38	0	+38	12	Semi-finals and 2025 Junior World Cup
2	South Korea	4	3	0	1	29	6	+23	9	Semi-finals and 2025 Junior World Cup
3	Chinese Taipei	4	2	0	2	14	13	+1	6	
4	Hong Kong	4	1	0	3	2	32	−30	3	
5	Sri Lanka	4	0	0	4	0	32	−32	0	

Source: FIH
Rules for classification: 1) points; 2) matches won; 3) goal difference; 4) goals for; 5) head-to-head result; 6) field goals for.

7 December 2024
16:45

Japan	15–0	Sri Lanka
Saito 3', 6', 53'; Yoshida 5', 28', 35', 53'; Hayasuke 18', 19', 42'; Hamaguchi 22'; Maruyama 26', 48', 57'; Wakasa 57'	Report

Umpires:
Binish Hayat (PAK)
Qiu Fang (CHN)

7 December 2024
19:00

Chinese Taipei	7–0	Hong Kong
Fan 9', 13'; Wang Y. 26', 48'; Lai 29', 46'; Zhu 55'	Report

Umpires:
Sharne Mayers (ZIM)
Minami Inamoto (JPN)

8 December 2024
14:30

South Korea	10–0	Sri Lanka
Sin 6', 9', 19'; Park S. 33', 53'; Kang 48', 50'; Choi 51'; Park Y. 52', 55'	Report

Umpires:
Shahiela Johari (MAS)
Liu Yu-Chen (TPE)

8 December 2024
16:45

Japan	13–0	Hong Kong
Saito 7', 30', 43'; Hayasuke 9', 37', 38'; Hiramitsu 11'; Takahashi 13'; Kawaguchi 17'; Egashira 42', 59'; Hamaguchi 54'; Matsui 55'	Report

Umpires:
Jang Heesun (KOR)
Shivani Sharma (IND)

9 December 2024
16:45

Chinese Taipei	2–7	South Korea
Fan 2'; Huang 29'	Report	Choi 15', 33'; Park M. 35', 50'; Park S. 58', 59'; Park Y. 59'

Umpires:
Binish Hayat (PAK)
Minami Inamoto (JPN)

10 December 2024
16:45

Hong Kong	2–0	Sri Lanka
Mohammed 11', 52'	Report

Umpires:
Liu Yu-Chen (TPE)
Wassana Pankemthong (THA)

11 December 2024
12:15

Japan	4–0	South Korea
Maruyama 29', 41', 54'; Wakasa 38'	Report

Umpires:
Shahiela Johari (MAS)
Qiu Fang (CHN)

11 December 2024
14:30

Sri Lanka	0–5	Chinese Taipei
	Report	Wang T. 20'; Huang 21', 57'; Wang Y. 23'; Fan 34'

Umpires:
Khamis Al Balushi (OMA)
Shivani Sharma (IND)

12 December 2024
12:15

South Korea	12–0	Hong Kong
Park S. 9', 23'; Sin 15'; Park M. 17', 37', 40'; Kang 28'; Choi 29', 39'; Park H. 47', 56'; Park Y. 54'	Report

Umpires:
Liu Yu-Chen (TPE)
Khamis Al Balushi (OMA)

12 December 2024
14:30

Chinese Taipei	0–6	Japan
	Report	Egashira 7'; Hayasuke 15'; Saito 44', 59'; Maruyama 46', 54'

Umpires:
See Rinky (HKG)
Wassana Pankemthong (THA)

== Classification round ==
=== Ninth and tenth place ===
14 December 2024
09:00

Bangladesh	8–0	Sri Lanka
Tuzzohora 8'; Riya 23', 28', 31', 49'; Pal 44'; Ema 53'; Khatun 57'	Report

Umpires:
See Rinky (HKG)
Wassana Pankemthong (THA)

=== Fifth to eighth place classification ===
==== Bracket ====
5–8 place
14 December
Chinese Taipei	1
Thailand	2
14 December
Malaysia	11
Hong Kong	0

Fifth place
15 December
Thailand	0
Malaysia	6
Seventh place
15 December
Chinese Taipei	6
Hong Kong	1

==== 5–8th place semi-finals ====
14 December 2024
11:30

Chinese Taipei	1–2	Thailand
Fan 48'	Report	Noo-Keaw 13'; Khamnon 30'

Umpires:
Shivani Sharma (IND)
Shahiela Johari (MAS)

14 December 2024
14:00

Malaysia	11–0	Hong Kong
Sofea 4', 16', 28'; Azureen 5'; Batrisyia 17'; Humaira 20', 45', 49'; Syakirah 30', 39'; Irdina 54'	Report

Umpires:
Jang Heesun (KOR)
Qiu Fang (CHN)

==== Seventh and eighth place ====
15 December 2024
11:30

Chinese Taipei	6–1	Hong Kong
Mao 8', 55'; Huang 27'; Fan 42'; Liang 54'; Wang Y. 55'	Report	Wong 4'

Umpires:
Wassana Pankemthong (THA)
Khamis Al Balushi (OMA)

==== Fifth and sixth place ====
15 December 2024
14:00

Thailand	0–6	Malaysia
	Report	Azureen 2', 9', 19'; Sofea 30', 53'; James 47'

Umpires:
Binish Hayat (PAK)
Jang Heesun (KOR)

== First to fourth place classification ==
=== Bracket ===
Semi-finals
14 December
Japan	1
India	3
14 December
China	4
South Korea	1

Final
15 December
India (p.s.o.)	1 (3)
China	1 (2)
Third place
15 December
Japan	1 (2)
South Korea (p.s.o.)	1 (3)

=== Semi–finals ===
14 December 2024
16:30

Japan	1–3	India
Maruyama 23'	Report	Mumtaz 4'; Sakshi 5'; Deepika 13'

Umpires:
Binish Hayat (PAK)
Mazin Al-Shukaili (OMA)

14 December 2024
19:00

China	4–1	South Korea
Feng 6'; Wang L. 24'; Lei 40'; Tan J. 53'	Report	Park S. 41'

Umpires:
Minami Inamoto (JPN)
Sharne Mayers (ZIM)

=== Third and fourth place ===
15 December 2024
16:30

Japan	1–1	South Korea
Kawaguchi 30+'	Report	Park H. 21'
Penalties
Ohtsuka (penalty shoot-out missed); Takahashi (penalty shoot-out scored); Kawaguchi (penalty shoot-out missed); Hamaguchi (penalty shoot-out scored); Yoshida (penalty shoot-out missed); Ohtsuka (penalty shoot-out missed)	2–3	(penalty shoot-out scored) Ryu; (penalty shoot-out scored) Park Y. (penalty shoot-out missed) Jang; (penalty shoot-out missed) Choi; (penalty shoot-out missed) Park M. (penalty shoot-out scored) Park M.

Umpires:
Shivani Sharma (IND)
Qiu Fang (CHN)

=== Final ===
15 December 2024
19:00

India	1–1	China
Kanika 41'	Report	Tan J. 30'
Penalties
Sakshi (penalty shoot-out scored); Mumtaz (penalty shoot-out missed); Ishika (penalty shoot-out scored); Kanika (penalty shoot-out missed); Sunelita (penalty shoot-out scored)	3–2	(penalty shoot-out missed) Wang; (penalty shoot-out scored) Hao; (penalty shoot-out scored) Liu; (penalty shoot-out missed) Li; (penalty shoot-out missed) Zuo

Umpires:
Minami Inamoto (JPN)
Shahiela Johari (MAS)

== Statistics ==
=== Final standings ===
Pos	Team	Qualification
1st place, gold medalist(s)	India	2025 Junior World Cup
2nd place, silver medalist(s)	China	2025 Junior World Cup
3rd place, bronze medalist(s)	South Korea	2025 Junior World Cup
4	Japan	2025 Junior World Cup
5	Malaysia	2025 Junior World Cup
6	Thailand	
7	Chinese Taipei	
8	Hong Kong	
9	Bangladesh	
10	Sri Lanka	

Source: FIH

=== Goalscorers ===
There were 206 goals scored in 29 matches, for an average of 7.1 goals per match.

12 goals

- (India) Deepika Sehrawat

9 goals

- (Japan) Niko Maruyama

8 goals

- (India) Kanika Siwach
- (Japan) Hanami Saito

7 goals

- (China) Hao Guoting
- (China) Wang Lihang
- (Japan) Sana Hayasuke

6 goals

- (China) Tan Jinzhuang
- (Chinese Taipei) Fan Hui-Yun
- (Malaysia) Nur Azureen
- (South Korea) Choi Ji-yun

5 goals

- (India) Mumtaz Khan
- (Malaysia) Azmyra Mia Sofea
- (South Korea) Park Mi-gyeong

4 goals

- (Bangladesh) Airin Riya
- (Chinese Taipei) Wang Yu-Chiu
- (South Korea) Sin Hyonji

3 goals

- (Bangladesh) Orpita Pal
- (China) Lei Jiajing
- (China) Liang Weizhi
- (China) Zou Lizhe
- (Chinese Taipei) Huang Yu-Ting
- (India) Sakshi Rana
- (Japan) Namie Egashira
- (Japan) Renon Hamaguchi
- (Japan) Rei Yoshida
- (Malaysia) Anith Humaira
- (Malaysia) Noor Asyiqin Syakirah
- (Malaysia) Zati Alyani
- (South Korea) Kang Yumin
- (South Korea) Park Hyeon-jeong
- (Thailand) Sudarat Noo-Keaw

2 goals

- (Bangladesh) Nadira Ema
- (China) Feng Qingmiao
- (China) Li Jingyi
- (China) Ma Xiaoyan
- (Chinese Taipei) Lai Ya-Han
- (Chinese Taipei) Mao I-Hsuan
- (Hong Kong) Ameera Mohammed
- (Japan) Haruka Kawaguchi
- (Japan) Mai Wakasa
- (South Korea) Park Yeong-eun

1 goal

- (Bangladesh) Sonia Khatun
- (Bangladesh) Fatema Tuzzohora
- (China) Liu Tangjie
- (China) Ma Xuejiao
- (China) Zeng Xueling
- (Chinese Taipei) Huang Ling-Hu
- (Chinese Taipei) Liang Yu-Chieh
- (Chinese Taipei) Wang Ting-ya
- (Chinese Taipei) Zhu Yi-Chun
- (Hong Kong) Hui Wong
- (India) Beauty Dungdung
- (India) Lalrinpuii
- (India) Manisha
- (India) Vaishnavi Phalke
- (Japan) Ai Hiramitsu
- (Japan) Anzu Matsui
- (Japan) Yui Takahashi
- (Malaysia) Thibatharshini James
- (Malaysia) Nor Nazihah
- (Malaysia) Nur Iman Adawiyah
- (Malaysia) Nur Syahirah
- (Malaysia) Nurdini Batrisyia
- (Malaysia) Siti Nur Irdina
- (South Korea) Park Seo-yeon
- (Thailand) Thanaphon Khamnon

Source: FIH

== See also ==
- 2024 Men's Hockey Junior Asia Cup
