= Japan women's national under-21 field hockey team =

Japan
- Association: Japan Hockey Association
- Confederation: AHF (Asia)

Junior World Cup
- Appearances: 3 (first in 2016)
- Best result: 7th (2023)

Junior Asia Cup
- Appearances: 10 (first in 1992)
- Best result: (silver) 2nd (2015)
Medal record
Junior Asia Cup
Silver medal – second place	2015 Changzhou
Bronze medal – third place	1996 Shirane
Bronze medal – third place	2023 Kakamigahara
Bronze medal – third place	2026 Moqi

The Japan women's national under-21 field hockey team represent Japan in women's international under-21 field hockey competitions and is controlled by the Japan Hockey Association, the governing body for field hockey in Japan.

== Tournament record ==
=== Junior World Cup ===
Junior World Cup record
Year	Host	Position	Pld	W	D	L	GF	GA	Squad
1989 to 2013		did not qualify							
2016	Santiago, Chile	9th	5	2	1	2	9	6	Squad
2022	Potchefstroom, South Africa	withdrew							
2023	Santiago, Chile	7th	6	3	0	3	11	8	Squad
2025	Santiago, Chile	11th	6	3	1	2	10	13	Squad
2027	TBD	Qualified							
Total		7th place	17	8	2	7	30	27	

=== Junior Asia Cup ===
Junior Asia Cup record
Year	Host	Position
1992	Kuala Lumpur, Malaysia	4th
1996	Shirane, Japan	3rd
2000	Kuala Lumpur, Malaysia	4th
2004	Hyderabad, India	4th
2008	Kuala Lumpur, Malaysia	4th
2012	Bangkok, Thailand	4th
2015	Changzhou, China	2nd
2023	Kakamigahara, Japan	3rd
2024	Muscat, Oman	4th
2026	Moqi, China	3rd
Best result		2nd

== Current squad ==
The following squad was announced for 2026 Junior Asia Cup.

Head Coach: (Japan) Keiko Miura

1. Riku Kurihara(GK)
2. Hana Asano
3. Aya Aoshima
4. Yoshino Hirai
5. Hana Maruyama
6. Kirari Hayashi
7. Momoka Suzuki
8. Yui Sakai
9. Yui Dobashi
10. Sachika Takahashi(C)
11. Renka Tetsuka
12. Yua Obama
13. Rin Washizu
14. Rei Yoshida
15. Ayano Usui
16. Hinano Kimura
17. Kokona Tanaka
19. Yuina Taya
20. Yuri Yoshioka
41. Mio Noda(GK)

== See also ==
- Japan women's national field hockey team
