= South Korea women's national under-21 field hockey team =

South Korea U21
- Association: Korea Hockey Association
- Confederation: AHF (Asia)
Home	Away

FIH ranking
- Current: 13

Junior World Cup
- Appearances: 11 (first in 1989)
- Best result: (gold) 1st (2001, 2005)

Junior Asia Cup
- Appearances: 10 (first in 1992)
- Best result: (gold) 1st (1992, 1996, 2000, 2008)
Medal record
Junior World Cup
Gold medal – first place	2001 Buenos Aires
Gold medal – first place	2005 Santiago
Silver medal – second place	1989 Ottawa
Bronze medal – third place	2009 Boston
Junior Asia Cup
Gold medal – first place	1992 Kuala Lumpur
Gold medal – first place	1996 Shirane
Gold medal – first place	2000 Kuala Lumpur
Gold medal – first place	2008 Kuala Lumpur
Silver medal – second place	2004 Hyderabad
Silver medal – second place	2023 Kakamigahara
Bronze medal – third place	2012 Bangkok
Bronze medal – third place	2015 Changzhou
Bronze medal – third place	2024 Muscat

The South Korea women's national under-21 field hockey team represents the Republic of Korea (South Korea). They are two-time World Champions, having won the titles in 2001 and 2005 consecutively. They are the four-time Junior Asia Cup Champions.

== Tournament record ==
=== Junior World Cup ===
- 1989 – (silver)
- 1993 – 4th
- 1997 – 5th
- 2001 – (gold)
- 2005 – (gold)
- 2009 – (bronze)
- 2013 – 11th
- 2016 – 12th
- 2022 – 6th
- 2023 – 11th
- 2025 – 16th
- 2027 – Qualified

=== Junior Asia Cup ===
- 1992 – (gold)
- 1996 – (gold)
- 2000 – (gold)
- 2004 – (silver)
- 2008 – (gold)
- 2012 – (bronze)
- 2015 – (bronze)
- 2021 – Cancelled
- 2023 – (silver)
- 2024 – (bronze)
- 2026 – 4th

== Current squad ==
The following team was announced for the 2026 Junior Asia Cup.

Head Coach: (South Korea) Lim Mi-sook

1. Choi Seoyeon(GK)
4. Kim Minjeong
7. Kim Woori
8. Lee Boyung
9. Eom Jieum
10. Kil Gabin
11. Lee Young-eun
13. Son Nara(GK)
14. Soyeon Park
16. Kim Subin
17. Sin Hyonji
19. Lee Jisoo
21. Kim Nakyung
23. Jung Sebhin
25. Na Kyeongmin
27. Jang Haeji
29. Eun Yeju
30. An Haemin
31. Jeong Yuri
33. Joo Soyeon(C)

== See also ==
- South Korea women's national field hockey team
