= 1989 Women's Hockey Junior World Cup =

International field hockey competition

Tournament details
- Host country: Canada
- City: Ottawa
- Dates: 19–30 July
- Teams: 12 (from 5 confederations)
- Venue: Nepean Sportsplex

Final positions
- Champions: West Germany (1st title)
- Runner-up: South Korea
- Third place: Soviet Union

Tournament statistics
- Matches played: 42
- Goals scored: 212 (5.05 per match)

The 1989 Women's Hockey Junior World Cup was the first edition of the Women's Hockey Junior World Cup, the quadrennial women's under-21 field hockey world championship organized by the International Hockey Federation. It was held at Nepean Sportsplex in Ottawa, Canada from 19 to 30 July 1989.

West Germany won the first edition of the Junior World Cup by defeating South Korea 2–0 in the final. The Soviet Union won the bronze medal by defeating the Netherlands 4–3.

== Preliminary round ==
=== Pool A ===
Pos	Team	Pld	W	D	L	GF	GA	GD	Pts	Qualification
1	West Germany	5	4	1	0	17	3	+14	9	Semi-finals
2	Soviet Union	5	4	1	0	19	6	+13	9	Semi-finals
3	China	5	3	0	2	16	5	+11	6	
4	Canada (H)	5	2	0	3	6	10	−4	4	
5	New Zealand	5	1	0	4	6	22	−16	2	
6	United States	5	0	0	5	1	19	−18	0	

Source: FIH
(H) Hosts

19 July 1989
10:00

Canada	0–1	China

19 July 1989
12:00

West Germany	1–1	Soviet Union

19 July 1989
14:00

New Zealand	3–1	United States

20 July 1989
14:00

Canada	1–3	Soviet Union

20 July 1989
16:00

West Germany	4–0	United States

21 July 1989
10:00

New Zealand	0–7	China

22 July 1989
11:00

West Germany	5–1	Canada

22 July 1989
14:00

New Zealand	1–6	Soviet Union

22 July 1989
16:00

United States	0–5	China

24 July 1989
10:00

West Germany	1–0	China

24 July 1989
12:00

United States	0–5	Soviet Union

24 July 1989
14:00

New Zealand	1–2	Canada

25 July 1989
14:00

Soviet Union	4–3	China

25 July 1989
16:00

Canada	2–0	United States

26 July 1989
10:00

West Germany	6–1	New Zealand

==== Pool B ====
Pos	Team	Pld	W	D	L	GF	GA	GD	Pts	Qualification
1	South Korea	5	5	0	0	37	4	+33	10	Semi-finals
2	Netherlands	5	4	0	1	34	4	+30	8	Semi-finals
3	Argentina	5	3	0	2	18	11	+7	6	
4	England	5	2	0	3	15	9	+6	4	
5	Zimbabwe	5	1	0	4	2	44	−42	2	
6	Chile	5	0	0	5	0	34	−34	0	

Source: FIH

19 July 1989
16:00

South Korea	13–0	Zimbabwe

20 July 1989
10:00

Argentina	1–2	Netherlands

20 July 1989
12:00

England	4–0	Chile

21 July 1989
12:00

South Korea	3–1	Netherlands

21 July 1989
14:00

Argentina	7–0	Chile

21 July 1989
16:00

England	10–0	Zimbabwe

23 July 1989
12:00

South Korea	3–1	England

23 July 1989
14:00

Argentina	5–1	Zimbabwe

23 July 1989
16:00

Netherlands	12–0	Chile

24 July 1989
16:00

Argentina	3–0	England

25 July 1989
10:00

Netherlands	16–0	Zimbabwe

25 July 1989
12:00

South Korea	10–0	Chile

26 July 1989
12:00

England	0–3	Netherlands

26 July 1989
14:00

Zimbabwe	1–0	Chile

26 July 1989
16:00

South Korea	8–2	Argentina

== Second round ==
=== Ninth to twelfth place classification ===
Semi-finals
28 July
New Zealand	2
Chile	1
28 July
United States	4
Zimbabwe	1

Ninth place
29 July
New Zealand	2
United States	0
11th place
29 July
Chile	1
Zimbabwe	0

=== Fifth to eighth place classification ===
Semi-finals
28 July
China	3
England	2
28 July
Canada	0
Argentina	3

Fifth place
30 July
China	4
Argentina	0
Seventh place
30 July
England	0
Canada	1

=== First to fourth place classification ===
Semi-finals
29 July
West Germany	2
Netherlands	1
29 July
Soviet Union	2
South Korea	3

Final
30 July
West Germany	2
South Korea	0
Third place
30 July
Netherlands	3
Soviet Union	4

==== Semi-finals ====
29 July 1989
09:00

West Germany	2–1	Netherlands

29 July 1989
11:30

Soviet Union	2–3	South Korea

==== Third and fourth place ====
30 July 1989
13:30

Netherlands	3–4	Soviet Union

==== Final ====
30 July 1989
16:00

West Germany	2–0	South Korea

== Final standings ==
1. West Germany
2. South Korea
3. Soviet Union
4. Netherlands
5. China
6. Argentina
7. Canada
8. England
9. New Zealand
10. United States
11. Chile
12. Zimbabwe
