= Women's Hockey Junior Asia Cup =

U21 field hockey tournament

- Most recent season or competition: 2026 Women's Hockey Junior Asia Cup
- Sport: Field hockey
- Founded: 1992; 34 years ago
- First season: 1992
- No. of teams: 10
- Confederation: Asian Hockey Federation
- Most recent champion: India (3rd title) (2026)
- Most titles: South Korea (4 titles)
- Qualification: Junior AHF Cup

The Women's Hockey Junior Asia Cup is a women's international under-21 field hockey tournament organized by the Asian Hockey Federation. The tournament has been held since 1992 and serves as a qualification tournament for the Junior World Cup. The most recent edition was held in China, won by India.

The tournament has been won by three different teams: South Korea has the most titles with four. China and India follows with three. The 2021 edition, to be held in Kakamigahara, Japan, was canceled due to the COVID-19 pandemic.

== Results ==
#	Year	Host	Final			Third place match			Teams
#	Year	Host	Winner	Score	Runner-up	Third place	Score	Fourth place	Teams
1	1992; Details	Kuala Lumpur, Malaysia	South Korea	3–2	China	India	2–1	Japan	7
2	1996; Details	Shirane, Japan	South Korea		China	Japan		Chinese Taipei	5
3	2000; Details	Kuala Lumpur, Malaysia	South Korea	2–1	China	India	3–1	Japan	8
4	2004; Details	Hyderabad, India	China	3–2	South Korea	India	2–0	Japan	4
5	2008; Details	Kuala Lumpur, Malaysia	South Korea	2–0	China	India	3–1	Japan	9
6	2012; Details	Bangkok, Thailand	China	5–2	India	South Korea	3–1	Japan	10
7	2015; Details	Changzhou, China	China	2–2 (3–1 s.o.)	Japan	South Korea	3–2	India	9
-	2021; Details	Kakamigahara, Japan	Cancelled due to the COVID-19 pandemic.			Cancelled			8
8	2023; Details	Kakamigahara, Japan	India	2–1	South Korea	Japan	2–1	China	10
9	2024; Details	Muscat, Oman	India	1–1 (3–2 s.o.)	China	South Korea	1–1 (3–2 s.o.)	Japan	10
10	2026; Details	Moqi, China	India	1–0	China	Japan	2–0	South Korea	10

== Performance by nations ==
Team	Winners	Runners-up	Third place	Fourth place
South Korea	4 (1992, 1996, 2000, 2008)	2 (2004, 2023)	3 (2012, 2015, 2024)	1 (2026)
China	3 (2004, 2012, 2015*)	6 (1992, 1996, 2000, 2008, 2024, 2026*)		1 (2023)
India	3 (2023, 2024, 2026)	1 (2012)	4 (1992, 2000, 2004*, 2008)	1 (2015)
Japan		1 (2015)	3 (1996, 2023*, 2026)	6 (1992, 2000, 2004, 2008, 2012, 2024)
Chinese Taipei				1 (1996)

* = host nation

== Team appearances ==
Team	(Malaysia) 1992	(Japan) 1996	(Malaysia) 2000	(India) 2004	(Malaysia) 2008	(Thailand) 2012	(China) 2015	(Japan) 2023	(Oman) 2024	(China) 2026	Total
Bangladesh	–	–	–	–	–	–	–	–	9th	5th	2
China	2nd	2nd	2nd	1st	2nd	1st	1st	4th	2nd	2nd	10
Chinese Taipei	6th	4th	7th	–	7th	–	9th	7th	7th	9th	8
Hong Kong	–	–	–	–	–	–	–	8th	8th	10th	3
India	3rd	–	3rd	3rd	3rd	2nd	4th	1st	1st	1st	9
Indonesia	–	–	–	–	–	–	–	10th	–	–	1
Japan	4th	3rd	4th	4th	4th	4th	2nd	3rd	4th	3rd	10
Kazakhstan	–	–	–	–	–	10th	–	6th	–	7th	3
Malaysia	5th	5th	6th	–	5th	5th	5th	5th	5th	6th	9
North Korea	–	–	–	–	–	–	7th	–	–	–	1
Pakistan	–	–	–	–	8th	8th	–	–	–	8th	3
Singapore	–	–	–	–	6th	9th	8th	–	–	–	3
South Korea	1st	1st	1st	2nd	1st	3rd	3rd	2nd	3rd	4th	10
Sri Lanka	7th	–	–	–	–	7th	–	–	10th	–	3
Thailand	–	–	8th	–	9th	6th	6th	–	6th	–	5
Uzbekistan	–	–	5th	–	–	–	–	9th	–	–	2
Total (16)	7	5	8	4	9	10	9	10	10	10	

== See also ==
- Men's Hockey Junior Asia Cup
- Women's Hockey Asia Cup
- Women's Junior AHF Cup
- Women's Hockey U18 Asia Cup
