= South Africa at the 2024 Summer Olympics =

- IOC code: RSA
- NOC: South African Sports Confederation and Olympic Committee
- Website: www.sascoc.co.za

in Paris, France 26 July 2024 – 11 August 2024
- Competitors: 142 (80 men and 62 women) in 21 sports
- Flag bearers (opening): Akani Simbine & Caitlin Rooskrantz
- Flag bearer (closing): Tatjana Smith
- Officials: Leon Fleiser, chef de mission
- Medals Ranked 44th: Gold 1 Silver 3 Bronze 2 Total 6

Summer Olympics appearances (overview)
- 1904; 1908; 1912; 1920; 1924; 1928; 1932; 1936; 1948; 1952; 1956; 1960; 1964–1988; 1992; 1996; 2000; 2004; 2008; 2012; 2016; 2020; 2024

South Africa competed at the 2024 Summer Olympics in Paris from 26 July to 11 August 2024. It was the nation's ninth consecutive appearance at the Games in the post-apartheid era and twenty-first overall in Summer Olympic history. South Africa won six medals (one gold, three silver and two bronze), good for 44th overall in the standings.

== Medalists ==
Medal	Name	Sport	Event	Date
Gold	Tatjana Smith	Swimming	Women's 100 m breaststroke	29 July
Silver	Tatjana Smith	Swimming	Women's 200 m breaststroke	1 August
Silver	Bayanda Walaza; Shaun Maswanganyi; Bradley Nkoana; Akani Simbine	Athletics	Men's 4 × 100 m relay	9 August
Silver	Jo-Ané van Dyk	Athletics	Women's javelin throw	10 August
Bronze	South Africa national rugby sevens team: Christie Grobbelaar; Ryan Oosthuizen; Impi Visser; Zain Davids; Quewin Nortje; Tiaan Pretorius; Tristan Leyds; Selvyn Davids; Shaun Williams; Rosko Specman; Siviwe Soyizwapi; Shilton van Wyk; Ronald Brown	Rugby sevens	Men's tournament	27 July
Bronze	Alan Hatherly	Cycling	Men's cross-country	29 July

Medals by sport
Sport	1st place, gold medalist(s)	2nd place, silver medalist(s)	3rd place, bronze medalist(s)	Total
Swimming	1	1	0	2
Athletics	0	2	0	2
Cycling	0	0	1	1
Rugby Sevens	0	0	1	1
Total	1	3	2	6

Medals by gender
Gender	1st place, gold medalist(s)	2nd place, silver medalist(s)	3rd place, bronze medalist(s)	Total
Male	0	1	2	3
Female	1	2	0	3
Mixed	0	0	0	0
Total	1	3	2	6

Medals by date
Date	1st place, gold medalist(s)	2nd place, silver medalist(s)	3rd place, bronze medalist(s)	Total
27 July	0	0	1	1
29 July	1	0	1	2
1 August	0	1	0	1
9 August	0	1	0	1
10 August	0	1	0	1
Total	1	3	2	6

Multiple medalists
Name	Sport	1st place, gold medalist(s)	2nd place, silver medalist(s)	3rd place, bronze medalist(s)	Total
Tatjana Smith	Swimming	1	1	0	2

== Competitors ==
Leon Fleiser was South Africa's chef de mission at the Games.

The following is the list of number of competitors in the Games.

Sport	Men	Women	Total
Archery	1	0	1
Athletics	27	11	38
Badminton	0	1	1
Canoeing	2	2	4
Cycling	4	4	8
Diving	0	1	1
Equestrian	1	0	1
Fencing	1	0	1
Field hockey	16	16	32
Golf	2	2	4
Gymnastics	0	1	1
Judo	0	1	1
Rowing	2	1	3
Rugby sevens	12	12	24
Skateboarding	2	1	3
Sport climbing	2	2	4
Surfing	2	1	3
Swimming	3	5	8
Triathlon	2	1	3
Wrestling	1	0	1
Total	80	62	142

== Archery ==
One South African archer qualified for the 2024 Summer Olympics men's individual recurve competitions by virtue of his result at the 2023 African Continental Qualification Tournament in Nabeul, Tunisia. Werner Potgieter of the Western Cape ranked No. 1 with a score of 652 and went on to secure the spot for South Africa by winning the silver medal. He was the first male archer to secure a spot for his country in archery since 2008.

Athlete	Event	Ranking round		Round of 64	Round of 32	Round of 16	Quarterfinals	Semifinals	Final / BM	
Athlete	Event	Score	Seed	Opposition Score	Opposition Score	Opposition Score	Opposition Score	Opposition Score	Opposition Score	Rank
Wian Roux	Men's individual	601	63	Kim J-d (KOR); L 0–6	Did not advance					

== Athletics ==
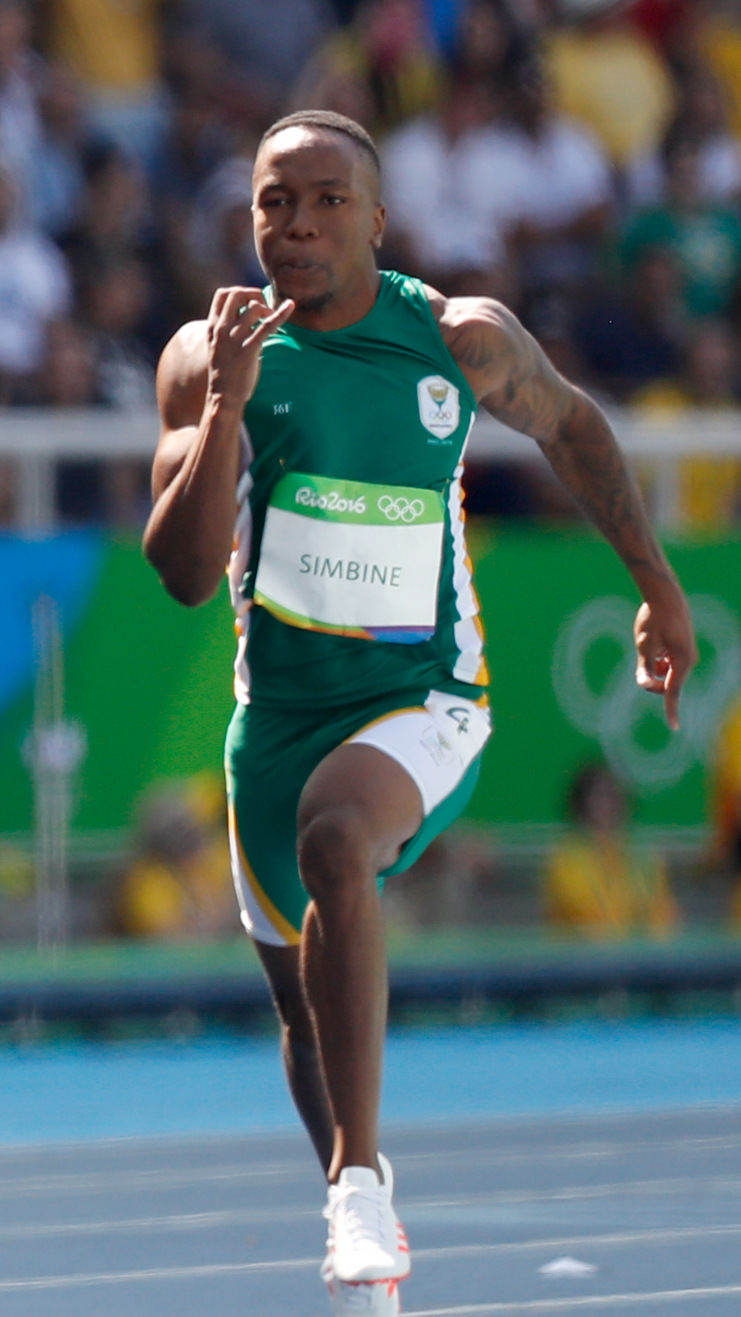
Akani Simbine

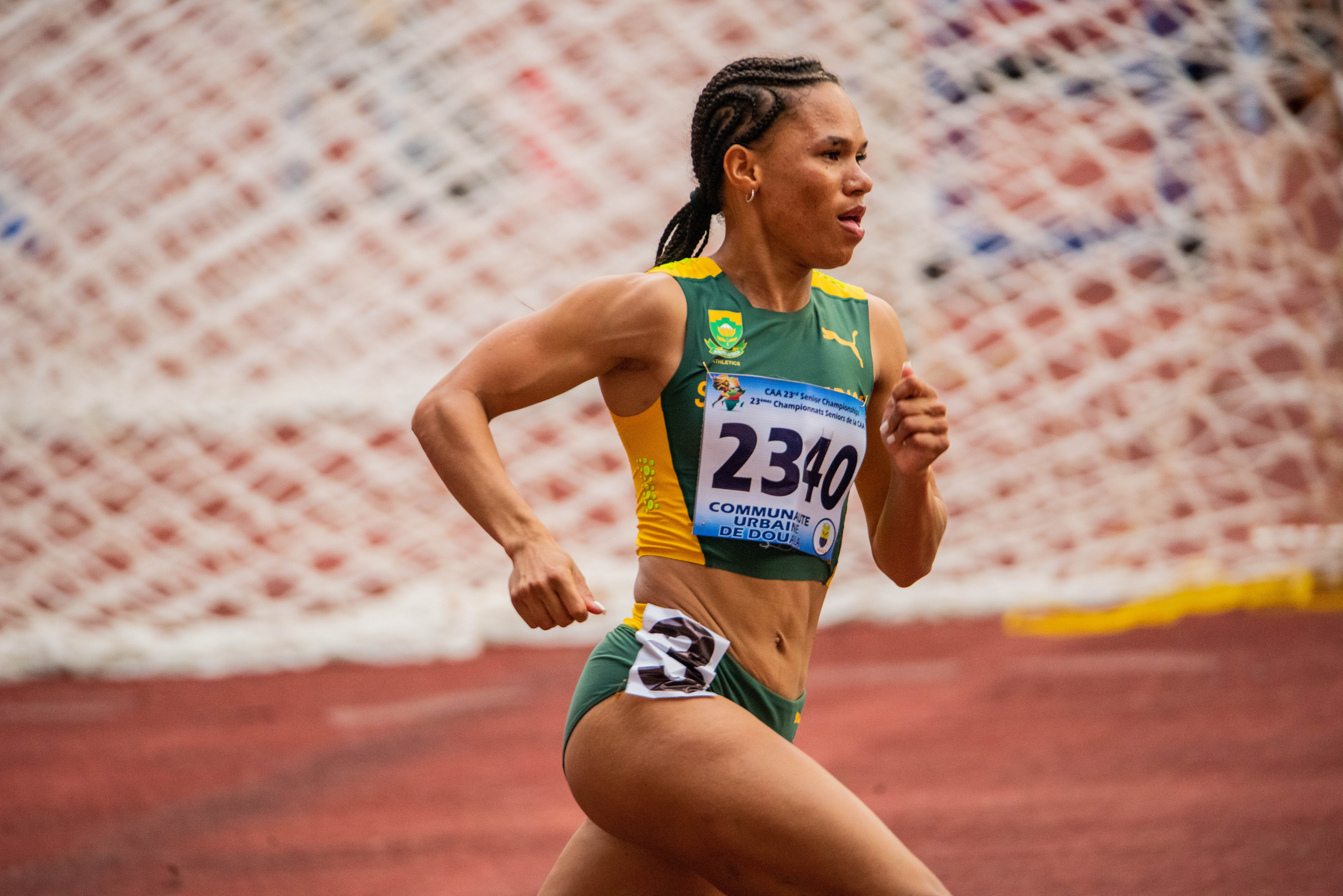
Miranda Coetzee

South African track and field athletes achieved the entry standards for Paris 2024, either by passing the direct qualifying mark (or time for track and road races) or by world ranking, in the following events (a maximum of 3 athletes each):

Key

- Note–Ranks given for track events are within the athlete's heat only
- Q = Qualified for the next round
- q = Qualified for the next round as a fastest loser or, in field events, by position without achieving the qualifying target
- qR = Advanced to next round by Referee
- NR = National record
- DNF = Did not finish
- DNS = Did not start
- N/A = Round not applicable for the event
- Bye = Athlete not required to compete in round

Track and road events

Athlete	Event	Heat		Repechage		Semifinal		Final	
Athlete	Event	Result	Rank	Result	Rank	Result	Rank	Result	Rank
Akani Simbine	Men's 100 m	10.03	1 Q	–		9.87	1 Q	9.82 NR	4
Shaun Maswanganyi	Men's 100 m	10.06	3 Q	–		10.02	5	Did not advance	
Benjamin Richardson	Men's 100 m	10.06	4 Q	–		9.95	3	Did not advance	
Shaun Maswanganyi	Men's 200 m	20.20	3 Q	Bye		20.42	4	Did not advance	
Wayde van Niekerk	Men's 200 m	20.42	3 Q	Bye		20.72 (.717)	7	Did not advance	
Benjamin Richardson	Men's 200 m	51.86	7	DNS		Did not advance			
Zakithi Nene	Men's 400 m	45.01	4	44.81	1 Q	45.06	6	Did not advance	
Lythe Pillay	Men's 400 m	45.60	7	45.40	1 Q	45.24	7	Did not advance	
Edmund du Plessis	Men's 800 m	1:45.73	2 Q	Bye		1:45.34	4	Did not advance	
Tshepo Tshite	Men's 1500 m	3:36.87	13	3:35.35	4	Did not advance			
Ryan Mphahlele	Men's 1500 m	3:38.48	12	3:36.64	11	Did not advance			
Adriaan Wildschutt	Men's 10000 m	—N/a						26:50.64 NR	10
Shaun Maswanganyi; Akani Simbine; Bayanda Walaza; Bradley Nkoana; Sinesipho Dambile (reserve)	Men's 4 × 100 m relay	37.94 SB	2 Q	—N/a				37.57	2nd place, silver medalist(s)
Wayde van Niekerk; Lythe Pillay; Zakithi Nene; Gardeo Isaacs; Antonie Nortje; Adrian Swart (reserve)	Men's 4 × 400 m relay	3:03.19	7 qR	—N/a				2:58.12 NR	5
Stephen Mokoka	Men's marathon	—N/a						2:10:59	27
Elroy Gelant	Men's marathon	—N/a						2:09:07	11
Miranda Coetzee	Women's 400 m	51.58	4	50.66	2 q	51.60	8	Did not advance	
Prudence Sekgodiso	Women's 800 m	1:59.84	2 Q	Bye		1:57.57	2 Q	1:58.79	8
Marione Fourie	Women's 100 m hurdles	12.91	4	12.79 Q	1	13.01	6	Did not advance	
Zenéy Geldenhuys	Women's 400 m hurdles	54.73	3 Q	Bye		53.90	3	Did not advance	
Rogail Joseph	Women's 400 m hurdles	54.56	2 Q	Bye		54.12	3	Did not advance	
Irvette van Zyl	Women's marathon	—N/a						2:31:14	37
Gerda Steyn	Women's marathon	—N/a						2:32:51	45
Cian Oldknow	Women's marathon	—N/a						2:30:29	32

Field events

Athlete	Event	Qualification		Final	
Athlete	Event	Distance	Position	Distance	Position
Brian Raats	Men's high jump	2.24	6 q	2.17	12
Jovan van Vuuren	Men's long jump	7.70	11	Did not advance	
Cheswill Johnson	Men's long jump	4.49	15	Did not advance	
Kyle Blignaut	Men's shot put	20.78	7	Did not advance	
Francois Prinsloo	Men's discus throw	61.35	23	Did not advance	
Victor Hogan	Men's discus throw	60.78	27	Did not advance	
Miné de Klerk	Women's shot put	15.63	31	Did not advance	
Jo-Ané van Dyk	Women's javelin throw	64.22	4 Q	63.93	2nd place, silver medalist(s)

== Badminton ==
For the first time since the nation's last participated at Rio 2016, South Africa entered one badminton player into the Olympic tournament based on the BWF Race to Paris Rankings.

Athlete	Event	Group stage			Elimination	Quarter-final	Semi-final	Final / BM	
Athlete	Event	Opposition Score	Opposition Score	Rank	Opposition Score	Opposition Score	Opposition Score	Opposition Score	Rank
Johanita Scholtz	Women's singles	Kim G-e (KOR); L (12–21, 6–21)	Goh JW (MAS); L (21–23, 11–21)	3	Did not advance				

== Canoeing ==
=== Sprint ===
For the first time since 2016, South African canoeists qualified two boats for the following distances through the gold medal result at the 2023 African Olympic in Abuja, Nigeria.

Athlete	Event	Heats		Quarterfinals		Semifinals		Final	
Athlete	Event	Time	Rank	Time	Rank	Time	Rank	Time	Rank
Hamish Lovemore	Men's K-1 1000 m	3:28.19	3 QF	3:36.64	2 SF	3:33.89	8 FB	3:27.94	9
Andrew Birkett	Men's K-1 1000 m	3:53.31	5 QF	3:38.11	3	Did not advance			
Hamish Lovemore; Andrew Birkett	Men's K-2 500 m	1:33.25	4 QF	1:29.75	2 SF	1:29.70	6 FB	1:31.79	12
Tiffany Koch	Women's K-1 500 m	2:02.76	6 QF	1:56.81	6	Did not advance			
Esti Olivier	Women's K-1 500 m	1:55.98	5 QF	1:53.21	6	Did not advance			
Tiffany Koch; Esti Olivier	Women's K-2 500 m	1:52.14	5 QF	1:46.40	6	Did not advance			

Qualification Legend: FA = Qualify to final (medal); FB = Qualify to final B (non-medal)

== Cycling ==
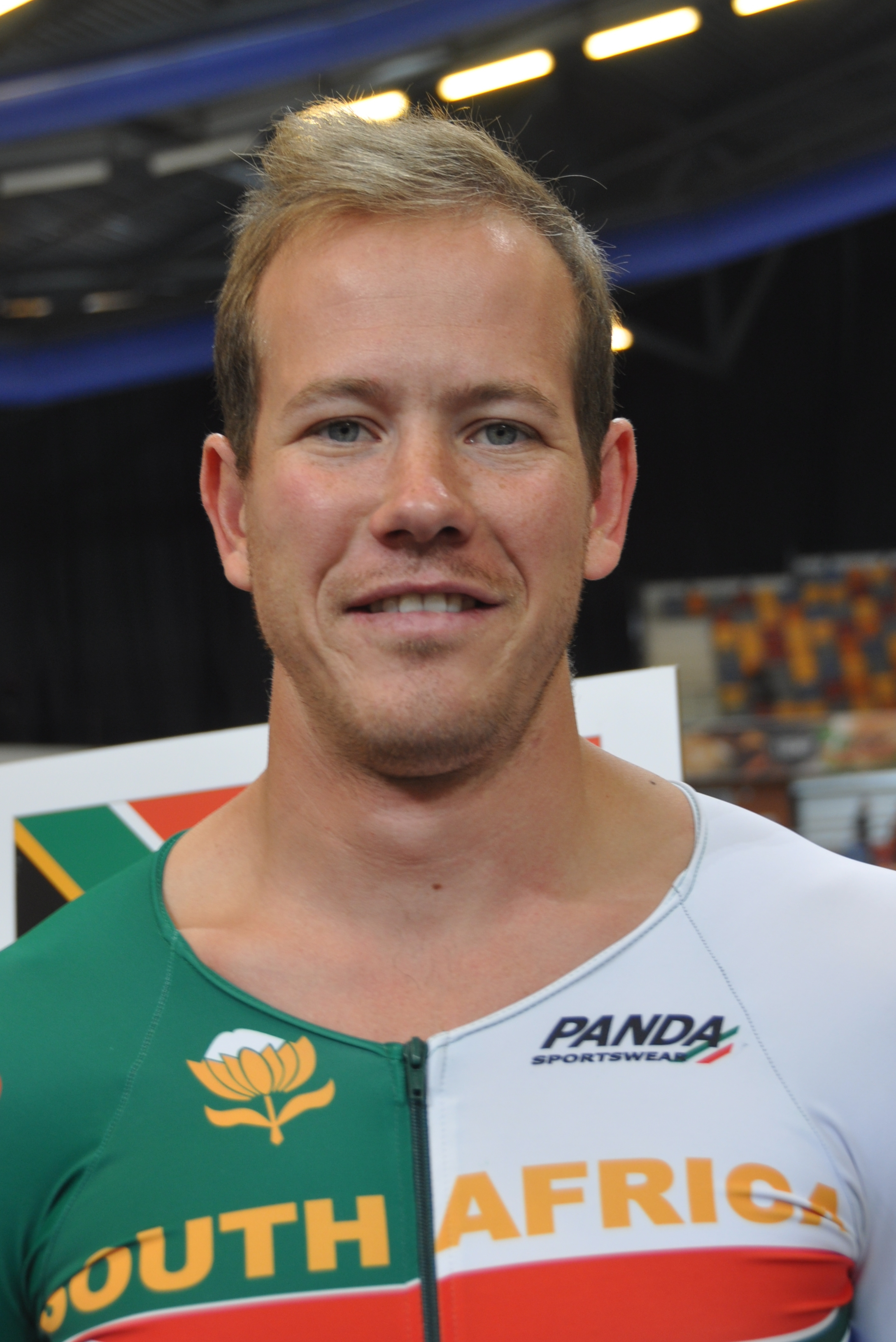
Jean Spies

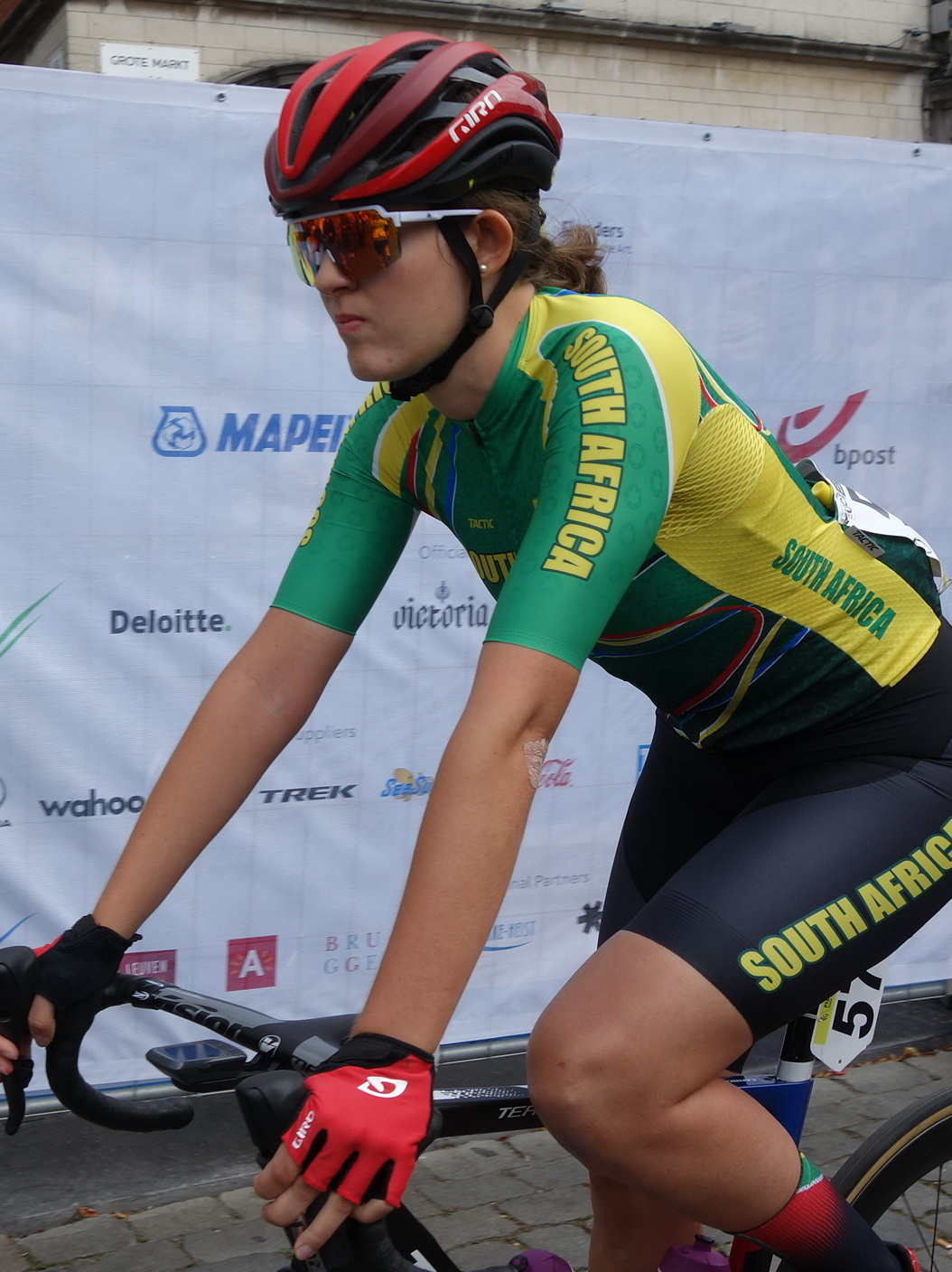
Tiffany Keep

=== Road ===
South Africa entered one male and two female riders to compete in the road race events at the Olympics. South Africa secured those quotas through the UCI Nation Ranking.

Athlete	Event	Time	Rank
Ryan Gibbons	Men's road race	6:39:27	69
Ashleigh Moolman Pasio	Women's road race	4:04:23	33
Tiffany Keep	Women's road race	DNF	

=== Track ===
South Africa entered one rider for men's sprint and keirin events, based on the allocations of continental spots, through the final UCI Olympic rankings.

Sprint

Athlete	Event	Qualification		Round 1	Repechage 1	Round 2	Repechage 2	Round 3	Repechage 3	Quarterfinals	Semifinals	Finals / BM	
Athlete	Event	Time Speed (km/h)	Rank	Opposition Time Speed (km/h)	Opposition Time Speed (km/h)	Opposition Time Speed (km/h)	Opposition Time Speed (km/h)	Opposition Time Speed (km/h)	Opposition Time Speed (km/h)	Opposition Time Speed (km/h)	Opposition Time Speed (km/h)	Opposition Time Speed (km/h)	Rank
Jean Spies	Men's sprint	9.962; 72.275	29	Did not advance									

Keirin

Athlete	Event	Round 1	Repechage	Quarterfinals	Semifinals	Final
Athlete	Event	Rank	Rank	Rank	Rank	Rank
Jean Spies	Men's keirin	6	5	Did not advance		

=== Mountain biking ===
South African mountain bikers secured a men's and women's quota place each in the Olympic cross-country race through the release of the final Olympic mountain biking rankings.

Athlete	Event	Time	Rank
Alan Hatherly	Men's cross-country	1:26:33	3rd place, bronze medalist(s)
Candice Lill	Women's cross-country	1:35:33	20

=== BMX ===
Freestyle

South African rider received a single quota spot in the men's BMX freestyle for Paris 2024, finishing among the top three eligible nations, not yet qualified, at the 2023 UCI BMX Freestyle World Championships in Glasgow, Scotland.

Athlete	Event	Qualification				Final		
Athlete	Event	Run 1	Run 2	Average	Rank	Run 1	Run 2	Rank
Vincent Leygonie	Men's freestyle	73.20	78.50	75.85	12	Did not advance		

Race

South African riders secured a single quota place in the women's BMX race for Paris 2024 by reallocation quota from 2023 African Championships.

Athlete	Event	Quarterfinal		Semifinal		Final	
Athlete	Event	Points	Rank	Points	Rank	Result	Rank
Miyanda Maseti	Women's race	23	8	Did not advance			

== Diving ==
South African divers secured a quota place for Paris 2024 by advancing to the top twelve final of the women's individual springboard at the 2023 World Aquatics Championships in Fukuoka, Japan.

Athlete	Event	Preliminary		Semifinal		Final	
Athlete	Event	Points	Rank	Points	Rank	Points	Rank
Julia Vincent	Women's 3 m springboard	283.50	13 Q	297.30	6 Q	271.25	11

== Equestrian ==
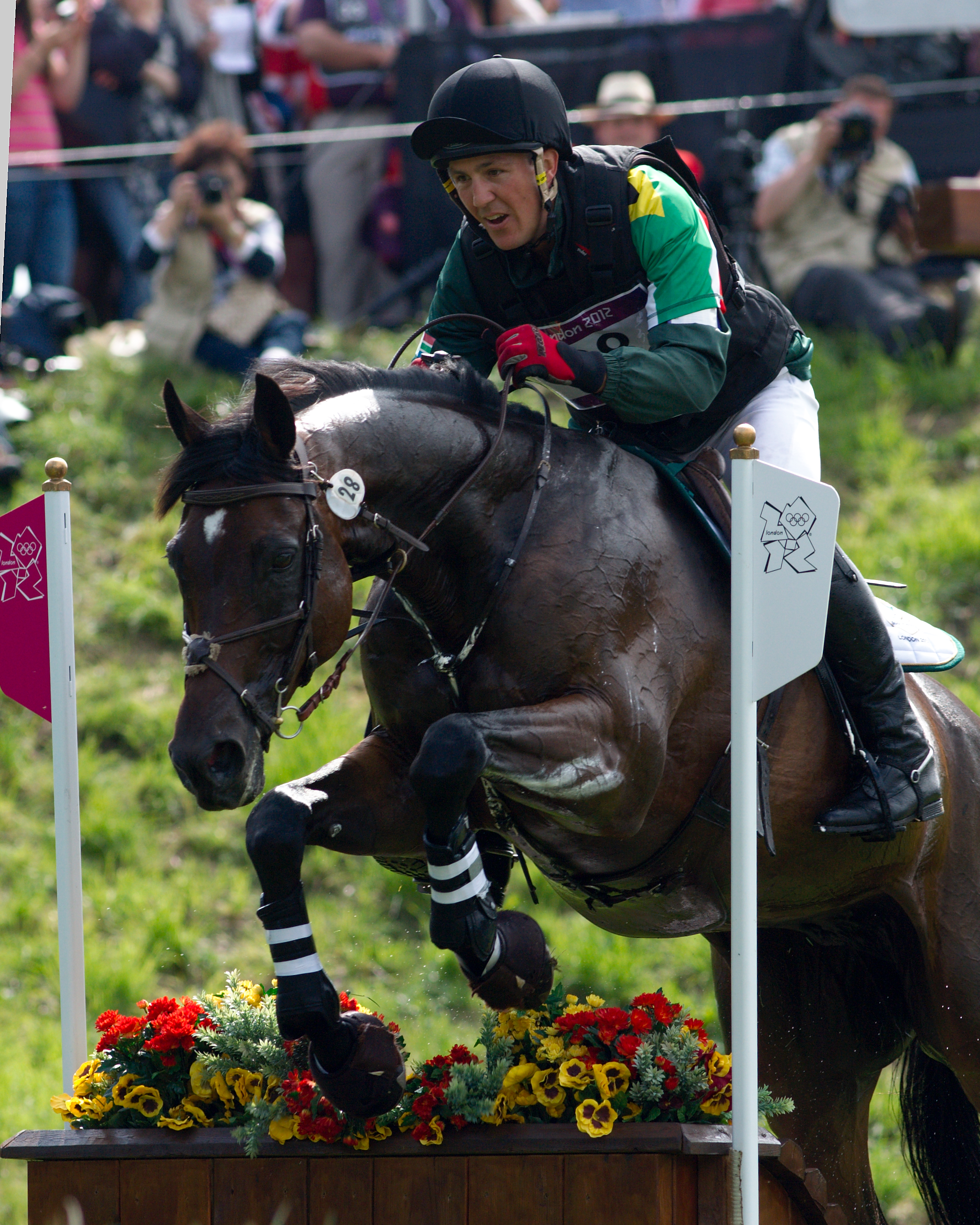
Alexander Peternell

South Africa entered one rider in the eventing event through the establishment of final Olympics ranking for Group F (Africa & Middle East).

=== Eventing ===
Athlete	Horse	Event	Dressage		Cross-country			Jumping						Total	
Athlete	Horse	Event	Dressage		Cross-country			Qualifier			Final			Total	
Athlete	Horse	Event	Penalties	Rank	Penalties	Total	Rank	Penalties	Total	Rank	Penalties	Total	Rank	Penalties	Rank
Alexander Peternell	Figaro Des Premices	Individual	39.0	56	33.2	72.2	51	5.6	77.8	43	Did not advance				

== Fencing ==
For the first time since 2008, South Africa entered one fencer into the Olympic competition. Harry Saner qualified for the games by winning the gold medal in the men's individual épée events at the 2024 African Zonal Qualifying Tournament in Algiers, Algeria.

Athlete	Event	Round of 64	Round of 32	Round of 16	Quarterfinal	Semifinal	Final / BM	
Athlete	Event	Opposition Score	Opposition Score	Opposition Score	Opposition Score	Opposition Score	Opposition Score	Rank
Harry Saner	Men's épée	Sharlaimov (KAZ); L 9–15	Did not advance					

== Field hockey ==
Summary

Key:

- FT – After full-time.
- P – Match decided by penalty-shootout.

Team	Event	Group stage						Quarterfinal	Semifinal	Final / BM	
Team	Event	Opposition Score	Opposition Score	Opposition Score	Opposition Score	Opposition Score	Rank	Opposition Score	Opposition Score	Opposition Score	Rank
South Africa men's	Men's tournament	Netherlands; L 3–5	Great Britain; D 2–2	Germany; L 1–5	Spain; L 0–3	France; W 5–2	5	Did not advance			
South Africa women's	Women's tournament	Australia; L 1–2	Argentina; L 2–4	Great Britain; L 1–2	Spain; L 0–1	United States; L 0–1	6	Did not advance			

=== Men's tournament ===
South Africa men's national field hockey team qualified by winning the 2023 Men's African Olympic Qualifier.

Team roster

South Africa announced their squad on 19 June 2024.

Head coach: Cheslyn Gie

No.	Pos.	Player	Date of birth (age)	Caps	Club
2	MF	Mustapha Cassiem	19 March 2002 (aged 22)	54	(Netherlands) HDM
3	DF	Andrew Hobson	20 March 1998 (aged 26)	31	(South Africa) Central
5	DF	Jacques van Tonder	11 April 2000 (aged 24)	27	(South Africa) WPCC Badgers
7	FW	Dayaan Cassiem (Captain)	1 December 1998 (aged 25)	77	(Netherlands) HDM
9	FW	Bradley Sherwood	28 May 1999 (aged 25)	42	(England) Oxted
10	FW	Keenan Horne	17 June 1992 (aged 32)	119	(France) Paris Jean-Bouin
11	FW	Tevin Kok	20 October 1996 (aged 27)	69	(Ireland) Pembroke Wanderers
13	DF	Matthew Guise-Brown	13 September 1991 (aged 32)	67	(England) Hampstead & Westminster
19	MF	Ryan Julius	19 June 1995 (aged 29)	81	(South Africa) Central
22	DF	Daniel Bell	28 September 1994 (aged 29)	106	(Belgium) Daring
23	MF	Nicholas Spooner	28 August 1991 (aged 32)	71	(Germany) Harvestehuder THC
24	MF	Zenani Kraai	5 November 2000 (aged 23)	18	(South Africa) Langa
27	FW	Nqobile Ntuli	15 January 1996 (aged 28)	103	(Germany) Harvestehuder THC
29	MF	Samkelo Mvimbi	23 January 1999 (aged 25)	58	(South Africa) WPCC Badgers
32	GK	Gowan Jones	24 June 1989 (aged 35)	90	(South Africa) Riverside
46	DF	Calvin Davis	22 November 2003 (aged 20)	1	(South Africa) Tuks

Group play

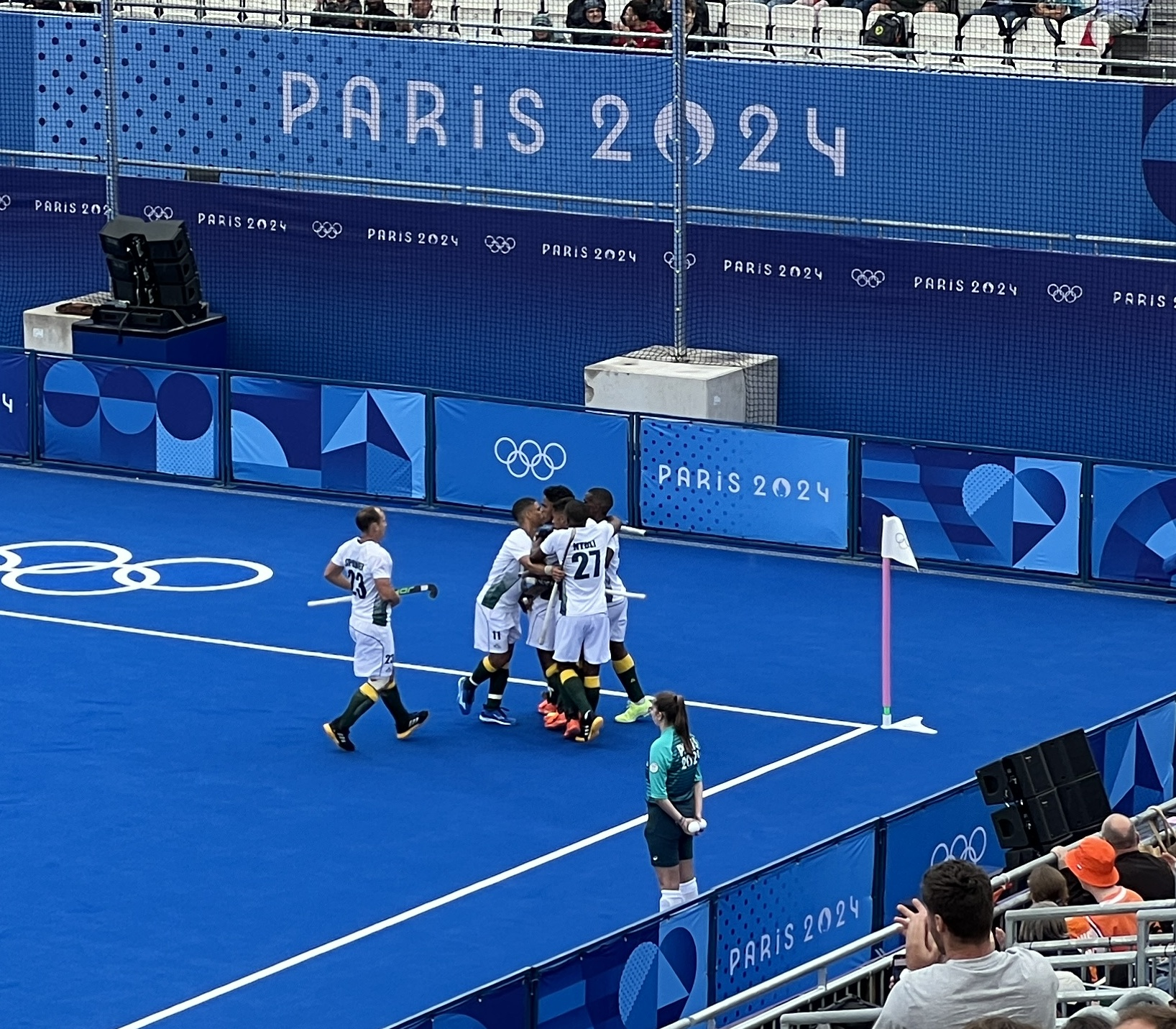
Mustapha Cassiem for celebrations to goal in Netherlands vs. South Africa

Pos	Team	Pld	W	D	L	GF	GA	GD	Pts	Qualification
1	Germany	5	4	0	1	16	6	+10	12	Advance to quarter-finals
2	Netherlands	5	3	1	1	16	9	+7	10	Advance to quarter-finals
3	Great Britain	5	2	2	1	11	7	+4	8	Advance to quarter-finals
4	Spain	5	2	1	2	11	12	−1	7	Advance to quarter-finals
5	South Africa	5	1	1	3	11	17	−6	4	
6	France (H)	5	0	1	4	8	22	−14	1	

Source: FIH
Rules for classification: 1) points; 2) matches won; 3) goal difference; 4) goals for; 5) head-to-head result; 6) field goals scored.
(H) Hosts

27 July 2024
12:45
v

Netherlands	5–3	South Africa
Janssen 2', 30'; De Geus 10'; Hoedemakers 16'; Telgenkamp 33'	Report	M. Cassiem 7'; Kok 34'; Guise-Brown 44'

Pitch 1
Umpires:
David Tomlinson (NZL)
Lim Hong Zhen (SGP)

28 July 2024
20:15
v

South Africa	2–2	Great Britain
Hobson 11'; Sherwood 53'	Report	Roper 32'; Shipperley 59'

Pitch 2
Umpires:
Marcin Grochal (POL)
Laurine Delforge (BEL)

30 July 2024
10:30
v

South Africa	1–5	Germany
Guise-Brown 35'	Report	Peillat 1', 39'; Rühr 15'; Weigand 17'; M. Grambusch 58'

Pitch 2
Umpires:
Dan Barstow (GBR)
Raghu Prasad (IND)

31 July 2024
19:45
v

Spain	3–0	South Africa
Reyne 25', 53'; Basterra 37'	Report

Pitch 1
Umpires:
Gareth Greenfield (NZL)
Ben Göntgen (GER)

2 August 2024
19:45
v

France	2–5	South Africa
Clément 16'; Charlet 25'	Report	Guise-Brown 2'; Horne 23'; M. Cassiem 56'; D. Cassiem 57', 60'

Pitch 1
Umpires:
Lim Hong Zhen (SGP)
Marcin Grochal (POL)

=== Women's tournament ===
South Africa women's national field hockey team qualified by winning the 2023 Women's African Olympic Qualifier.

Team roster

The squad was announced on 19 June 2024.

Head coach: Giles Bonnet

No.	Pos.	Player	Date of birth (age)	Caps	Goals	Club
1	GK	Anelle Lloyd	6 December 1993 (aged 30)	48	0	(South Africa) Mpumalanga
3	FW	Celia Seerane	18 June 1990 (aged 34)	185	48	(South Africa) Tuks
4	DF	Stephanie Botha	30 December 1998 (aged 25)	30	2	(South Africa) Somerset West
5	MF	Edith Molikoe	23 May 2000 (aged 24)	34	0	(South Africa) Tuks
8	FW	Kristen Paton	21 December 1996 (aged 27)	72	8	(Netherlands) HGC
10	MF	Onthatile Zulu	14 March 2000 (aged 24)	56	0	(South Africa) WPCC beavers
12	FW	Dirkie Chamberlain	3 November 1986 (aged 37)	243	130	(South Africa) North West
13	DF	Paris-Gail Isaacs	25 August 2006 (aged 17)	7	1	(South Africa) Beaulieu
14	MF	Taheera Augousti	23 September 2005 (aged 18)	26	2	(South Africa) Central
16	DF	Erin Christie (Captain)	20 March 1992 (aged 32)	105	9	(South Africa) WPCC beavers
17	FW	Ntsopa Mokoena	17 August 2004 (aged 19)	26	7	(South Africa) Central Samurais
18	DF	Hannah Pearce	17 November 1998 (aged 25)	41	0	(England) Birmingham
21	FW	Ongeziwe Mali	21 May 1999 (aged 25)	30	3	(South Africa) Maties
25	DF	Marié Louw	9 February 1996 (aged 28)	26	3	(South Africa) Bohemian
27	FW	Kayla de Waal	11 June 2000 (aged 24)	20	2	(South Africa) WPCC beavers
28	FW	Quanita Bobbs (Captain)	3 September 1993 (aged 30)	184	37	(South Africa) Central
30	MF	Kayla Swarts	24 May 2003 (aged 21)	24	0	(South Africa) Central

Group play

Pos	Team	Pld	W	D	L	GF	GA	GD	Pts	Qualification
1	Australia	5	4	1	0	15	5	+10	13	Quarter-finals
2	Argentina	5	4	1	0	16	7	+9	13	Quarter-finals
3	Spain	5	2	1	2	6	7	−1	7	Quarter-finals
4	Great Britain	5	2	0	3	8	12	−4	6	Quarter-finals
5	United States	5	1	1	3	5	13	−8	4	
6	South Africa	5	0	0	5	4	10	−6	0	

Source: FIH
Rules for classification: 1) points; 2) matches won; 3) goal difference; 4) goals for; 5) head-to-head result; 6) field goals scored.

28 July 2024
12:45
v

Australia	2–1	South Africa
Kershaw 16'; T. Stewart 40'	Report	De Waal 14'

Pitch 1
Umpires:
Emi Yamada (JPN)
Rachel Williams (GBR)

29 July 2024
17:30
v

South Africa	2–4	Argentina
Louw 15'; De Waal 29'	Report	Gorzelany 17', 49', 52'; Jankunas 53'

Pitch 2
Umpires:
Ayanna McClean (TTO)
Laurine Delforge (BEL)

31 July 2024
10:30
v

South Africa	1–2	Great Britain
De Waal 6'	Report	Costello 19'; French 42'

Pitch 2
Umpires:
Amber Church (NZL)
Cookie Tan (SGP)

1 August 2024
17:30
v

Spain	1–0	South Africa
Iglesias 15'	Report

Pitch 2
Umpires:
Emi Yamada (JPN)
Hannah Harrison (GBR)

3 August 2024
13:15
v

United States	1–0	South Africa
Sholder 43'	Report

Pitch 2
Umpires:
Hannah Harrison (GBR)
Cookie Tan (SGP)

== Golf ==
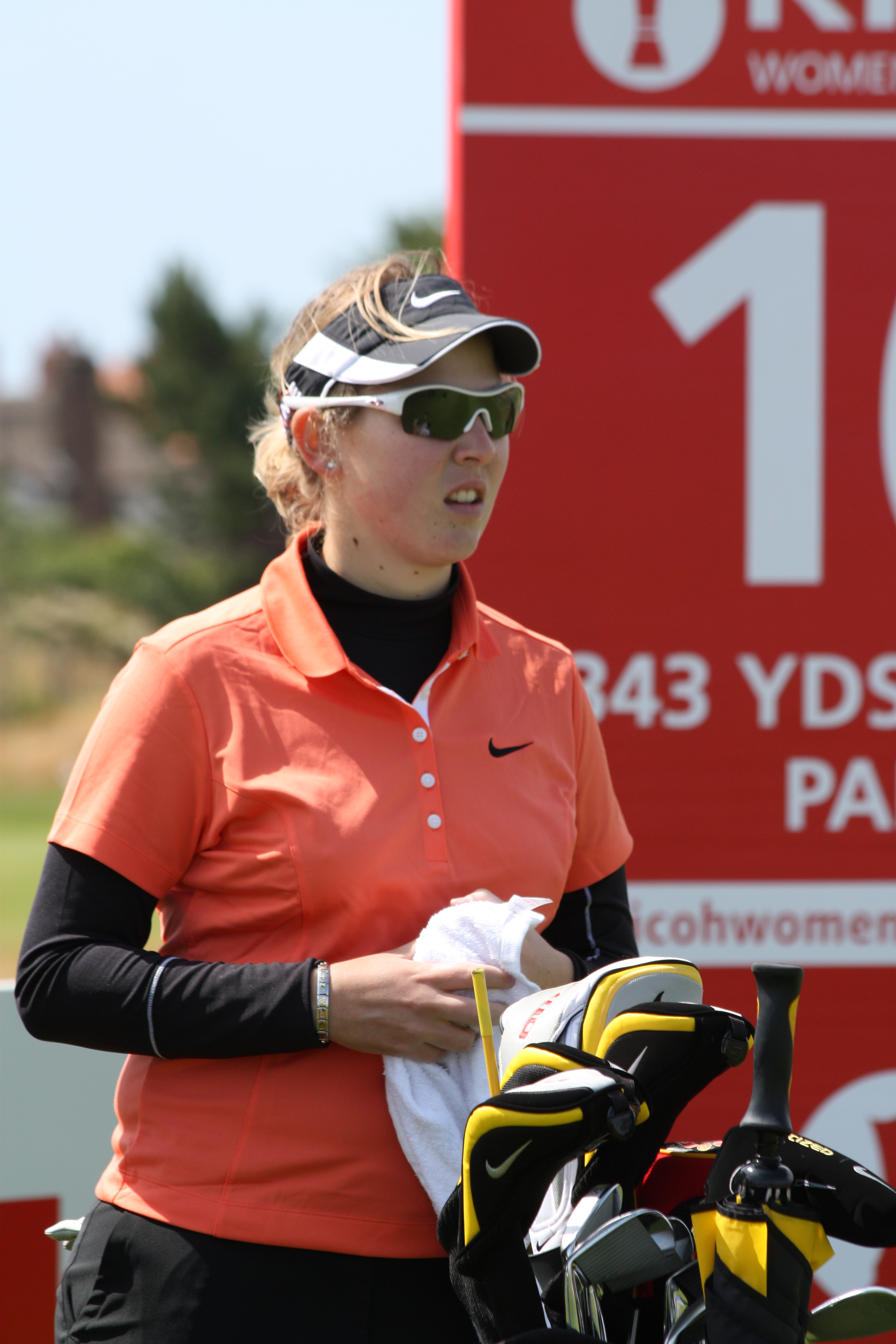
Ashleigh Buhai

South Africa entered four golfers into the Olympic tournament. Christiaan Bezuidenhout, Erik van Rooyen, Ashleigh Buhai, and Paula Reto; all qualified directly for the games in the individual competitions, based on their world ranking performance, on the IGF World Rankings.

Athlete	Event	Round 1	Round 2	Round 3	Round 4	Total		
Athlete	Event	Score	Score	Score	Score	Score	Par	Rank
Christiaan Bezuidenhout	Men's	70	71	64	69	274	−10	16
Erik van Rooyen	Men's	67	69	69	70	275	−9	17
Ashleigh Buhai	Women's	68	73	74	70	285	−3	T13
Paula Reto	Women's	78	73	76	72	299	+11	T44

== Gymnastics ==
=== Artistic ===
South Africa entered one female gymnast into the games. Caitlin Rooskrantz qualified for the games by virtue of her individual results through all-around event at the 2023 World Artistic Gymnastics Championships in Antwerp, Belgium.

Women

Athlete	Event	Qualification						Final					
Athlete	Event	Apparatus				Total	Rank	Apparatus				Total	Rank
Athlete	Event	V	UB	BB	F	Total	Rank	V	UB	BB	F	Total	Rank
Caitlin Rooskrantz	All-around	DNS	13.733	11.333	10.866		DNF	Did not advance					

== Judo ==
South Africa qualified one judoka for the following weight class at the Games. Geronay Whitebooi (women's extra-lightweight, 48 kg) qualified via continental quota based on Olympic point rankings.

Athlete	Event	Round of 32	Round of 16	Quarterfinals	Semifinals	Repechage	Final / BM	
Athlete	Event	Opposition Result	Opposition Result	Opposition Result	Opposition Result	Opposition Result	Opposition Result	Rank
Geronay Whitebooi	Women's −48 kg	Solís (GUA); W 10–01	Tsunoda (JPN); L 00–11	Did not advance				

== Rowing ==
South African rowers qualified boats in each of the following classes through the 2023 World Rowing Championships in Belgrade, Serbia and 2023 African Qualification Regatta in Tunis, Tunisia.

Athlete	Event	Heats		Repechage		Quarterfinals		Semifinals		Final	
Athlete	Event	Time	Rank	Time	Rank	Time	Rank	Time	Rank	Time	Rank
John Smith; Christopher Baxter	Men's coxless pair	6:36.71	2 Q	Bye		—N/a		6:40.35	4 FB	6:27.11	9
Paige Badenhorst	Women's single sculls	7:39.19	3 QF	Bye		7:44.03	4 SC/D	7:55.91	1 FC	7:27.76	14

Qualification Legend: FA=Final A (medal); FB=Final B (non-medal); FC=Final C (non-medal); FD=Final D (non-medal); FE=Final E (non-medal); FF=Final F (non-medal); SA/B=Semifinals A/B; SC/D=Semifinals C/D; SE/F=Semifinals E/F; QF=Quarterfinals; R=Repechage

== Rugby sevens ==
Summary

Team	Event	Pool round				Quarterfinal	Semifinal/Classification	Final / BM	
Team	Event	Opposition Result	Opposition Result	Opposition Result	Rank	Opposition Result	Opposition Result	Opposition Result	Rank
South Africa men's	Men's tournament	Ireland; L 5–10	New Zealand; L 5–17	Japan; W 49–5	3 Q	New Zealand; W 14–7	France; L 7–19	Australia; W 26–19	3rd place, bronze medalist(s)
South Africa women's	Women's tournament	Australia; L 5–34	Ireland; L 0–38	Great Britain; L 17–26	4	—N/a	Japan; L 12–15	Fiji; W 21–15	11

=== Men's tournament ===
South Africa national rugby sevens team qualified for the Olympics by winning the 2024 Men's Rugby Sevens Final Olympic Qualification Tournament in Monaco.

Squad

South Africa's squad of 12 players was named on 10 July 2024. Additionally, Ronald Brown and Katlego Letebele were named as traveling reserves.

Head coach: Philip Snyman

No.	Player	Date of birth (age)
1	Christie Grobbelaar	25 May 2000 (aged 24)
2	Ryan Oosthuizen	22 May 1995 (aged 29)
3	Impi Visser	30 May 1995 (aged 29)
4	Zain Davids	4 May 1997 (aged 27)
5	Quewin Nortje	14 January 2003 (aged 21)
6	Tiaan Pretorius	19 February 2001 (aged 23)
7	Tristan Leyds	24 May 1997 (aged 27)
8	Selvyn Davids (c)	26 March 1994 (aged 30)
9	Shaun Williams	13 April 1998 (aged 26)
10	Rosko Specman	28 April 1989 (aged 35)
11	Siviwe Soyizwapi	7 December 1992 (aged 31)
12	Shilton van Wyk	22 December 1999 (aged 24)
13	Ronald Brown	2 September 1995 (aged 28)

Group stage

Pos	Team	Pld	W	D	L	PF	PA	PD	Pts	Qualification
1	New Zealand	3	3	0	0	71	29	+42	9	Advance to Quarter-finals
2	Ireland	3	2	0	1	62	24	+38	7	Advance to Quarter-finals
3	South Africa	3	1	0	2	59	32	+27	5	Advance to Quarter-finals
4	Japan	3	0	0	3	22	129	−107	3	

Source: World Rugby
Rules for classification: 1) Points; 2) Head-to-head result; 3) Point difference; 4) Points scored.

24 July 2024
17:30

Ireland	10–5	South Africa
Try: Conroy 8' m Kennedy 12' m	World Rugby	Try: S. Davids 14' m

Stade de France, Paris
Attendance: 69,000
Referee: Gianluca Gnecchi (Italy)

24 July 2024
21:30

New Zealand	17–5	South Africa
Try: Leo (2) 2' m, 11' c McGarvey-Black 7' m Con: Rokolisoa (1/1) 12'	World Rugby	Try: S. Davids 4' m

Stade de France, Paris
Attendance: 69,000
Referee: Reuben Keane (Australia)

25 July 2024
16:00

South Africa	49–5	Japan
Try: Z. Davids 1' c Visser 3' c van Wyk (2) 4' c, 14' c Oosthuizen (2) 6' c, 7' c Specman 11' c Con: Leyds (5/5) 2', 3', 4', 6', 8'; Brown (2/2) 12', 14'	World Rugby	Try: Ueda 10' m

Stade de France, Paris
Attendance: 70,000
Referee: Nick Hogan (New Zealand)

Ranking of third-placed teams

Pos	Grp	Team	Pld	W	D	L	PF	PA	PD	Pts	Qualification
1	C	United States	3	1	1	1	57	67	−10	6	Advance to Quarter-finals
2	A	South Africa	3	1	0	2	59	32	+27	5	Advance to Quarter-finals
3	B	Samoa	3	1	0	2	52	49	+3	5	

Source: World Rugby
Rules for classification: 1) Points; 2) Point difference; 3) Points scored.

Quarter-final

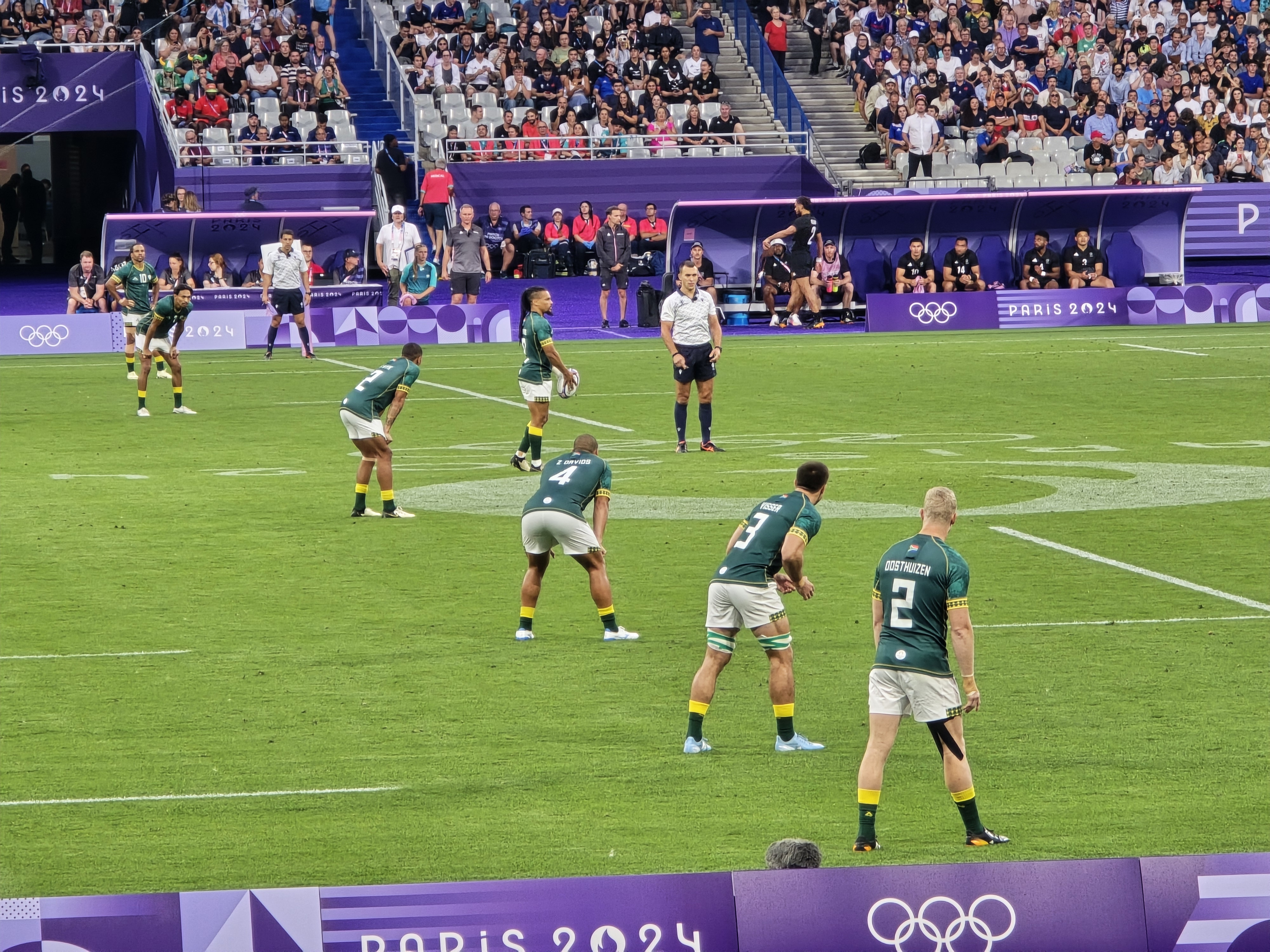
South Africa kick off against New Zealand

25 July 2024
21:00

New Zealand	7–14	South Africa
Try: Leo 10' c Con: Knewstubb (1/1) 10'	World Rugby	Try: S. Davids 3' c Leyds 7' c Con: Leyds (2/2) 4', 7'

Stade de France, Paris
Attendance: 70,000
Referee: Adam Leal (England/Great Britain)

Semi-final

27 July 2024
15:30

South Africa	5–19	France
Try: Leyds 10' m	World Rugby	Try: Rebbadj (2) 11' c, 14' c Sepho 15' m Con: Rebbadj (2/3) 12', 14'

Stade de France, Paris
Referee: Rueben Keane (Australia)

Bronze Medal Match

27 July 2024
19:00

(bronze) South Africa	26–19	Australia
Try: S. Davids 6' m Z. Davids (2) 10' c, 11' c Williams 15' c Con: Leyds (2/3) 10', 11'; Soyizwapi (1/1) 15'	World Rugby	Try: Lawson 5' c Toole 12' c Paterson 14' m Con: Roache (2/3) 5', 13'

Stade de France, Paris
Referee: Jérémy Rozier (France)

=== Women's tournament ===
South Africa women's national rugby sevens team qualified for the Olympics by winning the gold medal and securing an outright berth at the 2023 Africa Women's Sevens in Monastir, Tunisia.

Squad

South Africa's squad of 12 players was named on 29 June 2024. Additionally, Shiniqwa Lamprecht and Shona-Leah Weston were named as traveling reserves.

Head coach: Renfred Dazel

- Mathrin Simmers (cc)
- Zintle Mpupha (cc)
- Sizophila Solontsi
- Veroeshka Grain
- Kemisetso Baloyi
- Nadine Roos
- Liske Lategan
- Byrhandré Dolf
- Ayanda Malinga
- Libbie Janse van Rensburg
- Marlize de Bruin
- Maria Tshiremba

Group stage

Pos	Team	Pld	W	D	L	PF	PA	PD	Pts	Qualification
1	Australia	3	3	0	0	89	24	+65	9	Quarter-finals
2	(United Kingdom) Great Britain	3	2	0	1	52	65	−13	7	Quarter-finals
3	(Republic of Ireland) Ireland	3	1	0	2	64	40	+24	5	Quarter-finals
4	South Africa	3	0	0	3	22	98	−76	3	

Source: World Rugby
Rules for classification: 1) Points; 2) Head-to-head result; 3) Point difference; 4) Points scored.

28 July 2024
16:00

Australia	34–5	South Africa
Try: M. Levi (4) 1' c, 6' c, 8' m, 10' m Nathan 4' m T. Levi 8' m Con: Hinds (2/6) 2', 7'	World Rugby	Try: Roos 16' m

Stade de France, Paris
Referee: Lavenia Rawaca (Fiji)

28 July 2024
19:00

Ireland	38–0	South Africa
Try: Parsons (2) 6' c, 12' c Murphy Crowe 8' c Flood 10' c Elmes Kinlan 14' m Higgins 15' m Con: Mulhall (1/1) 6'; Flood (3/5) 9', 11', 12'	World Rugby

Stade de France, Paris
Referee: Talal Chaudhry (Canada)

29 July 2024
14:00

Great Britain	26–17	South Africa
Try: Crompton 8' c Norman-Bell 8' c Joyce (2) 11' m, 14' c Con: Norman-Bell (3/3) 8', 8', 15'	World Rugby	Try: Janse van Rensburg 1' c Roos 6' m Malinga 10' m Con: Roos (1/3) 1'

Stade de France, Paris
Referee: Tyler Miller (Australia)

9–12 Semi-final

29 July 2024
20:00

Japan	15–12	South Africa
Try: Hara 4' m Kajiki (2) 12' m, 14' m	World Rugby	Try: Janse van Rensburg 1' m Roos 7'; Con: Roos (1/2) 8'

Stade de France, Paris
Referee: Cisco Lopez (United States)

Eleventh Place Match

30 July 2024
16:30

South Africa	21–15	Fiji
Try: Roos (2) 1' c, 4' c Mpupha 9' c Con: Roos (3/3) 2', 4', 9'	World Rugby	Try: Lomani 11' m Ditavutu 12' m Wilson 15' m

Stade de France, Paris
Referee: Ano Kuwai (Japan)

== Skateboarding ==
South Africa entered three skateboarders (two males and one female) to compete in each of the following events at the Games.

Athlete	Event	Qualification		Final	
Athlete	Event	Score	Rank	Score	Rank
Dallas Oberholzer	Men's park	33.83	22	Did not advance	
Brandon Valjalo	Men's street	197.17	12	Did not advance	
Boipelo Awuah	Women's street	159.34	18	Did not advance	

== Sport climbing ==
South Africa qualified four climbers for Paris. All of them qualified directly for the combined and speed events by winning the gold medal at the 2023 Africa Olympic Qualifier in Pretoria.

Boulder & lead combined

Athlete	Event	Qualification						Final					
Athlete	Event	Boulder		Lead		Total	Rank	Boulder		Lead		Total	Rank
Athlete	Event	Result	Place	Result	Place	Total	Rank	Result	Place	Result	Place	Total	Rank
Mel Janse van Rensburg	Men's	9.4	=19	7.1	20	16.5	20	Did not advance					
Lauren Mukheibir	Women's	0.0	20	4.1	20	4.1	20	Did not advance					

Speed

Athlete	Event	Qualification		Round of 16	Quarterfinals	Semifinals	Final / BM	
Athlete	Event	Time	Rank	Opposition Time	Opposition Time	Opposition Time	Opposition Time	Rank
Joshua Bruyns	Men's	6.18	13	Maimuratov (KAZ); L 5.84–4.94	Did not advance			13
Aniya Holder	Women's	9.12	14	Miroslaw (POL); L 9.36–6.10	Did not advance			14

== Surfing ==
South African surfers confirmed three shortboard quota places for Tahiti. Jordy Smith and Sarah Baum topped the list of eligible surfers from Africa to secure the lone available berth in their respective shortboard races at the 2023 ISA World Surfing Games in Surf City, El Salvador.

Athlete	Event	Round 1		Round 2	Round 3	Quarterfinal	Semifinal	Final / BM	
Athlete	Event	Score	Rank	Opposition Result	Opposition Result	Opposition Result	Opposition Result	Opposition Result	Rank
Jordy Smith	Men's shortboard	7.60	2 R2	Waida (INA); W 9.50–5.40	Correa (PER); L 12.20–15.00	Did not advance			
Matthew McGillivray	Men's shortboard	5.26	3 R2	Vaast (FRA); L 10.67–14.03	Did not advance				
Sarah Baum	Women's shortboard	8.47	2 R2	Kemp (GER); W 10.50–4.94	Moore (USA); L 3.87–8.16	Did not advance			

Qualification legend: R3 – Qualifies to elimination rounds; R2 – Qualifies to repechage round

== Swimming ==
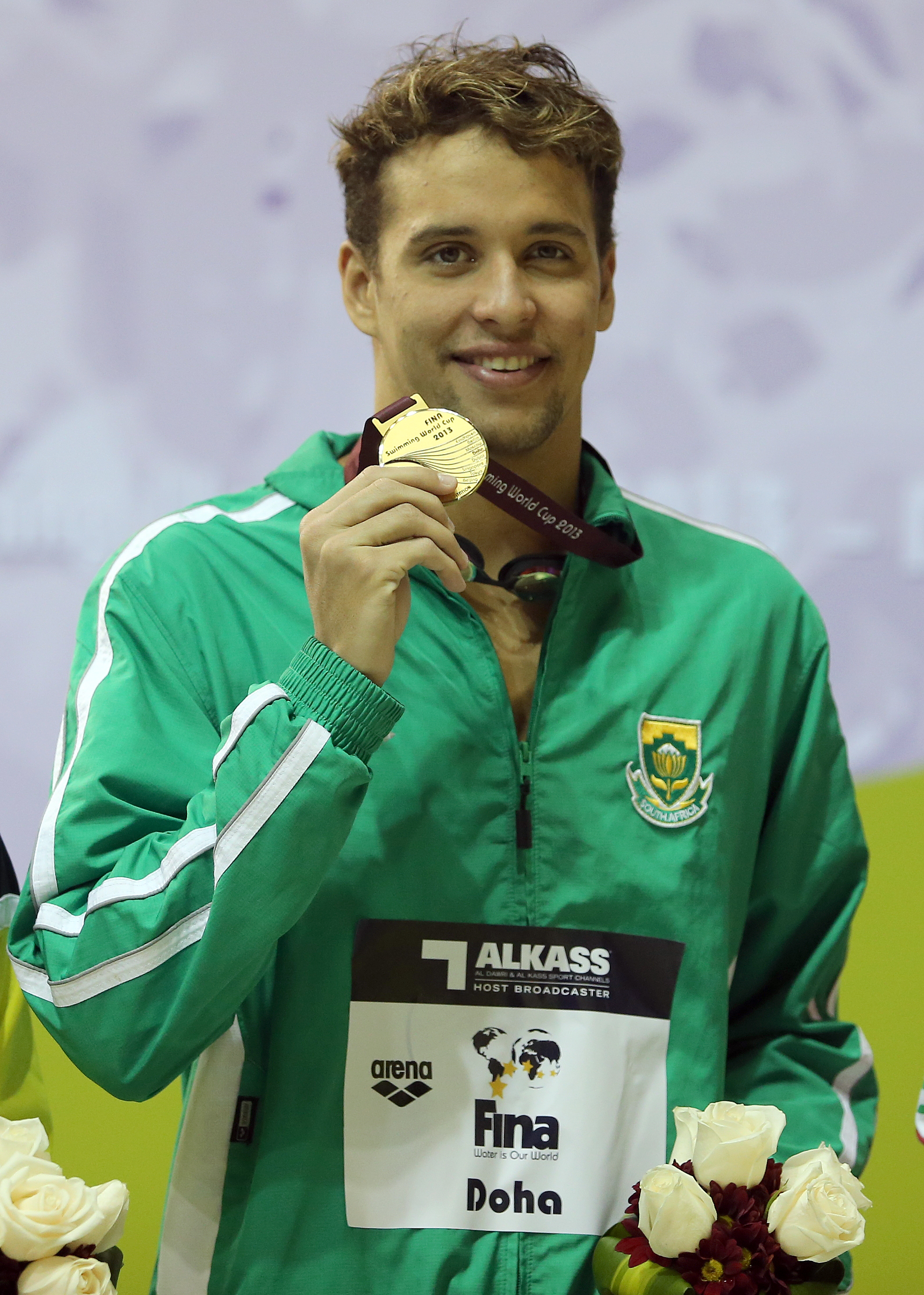
Chad le Clos

South African swimmers achieved the entry standards in the following events for Paris 2024 (a maximum of two swimmers under the Olympic Qualifying Time (OQT) and potentially at the Olympic Consideration Time (OCT)):

Athlete	Event	Entry	Heat		Semifinal		Final	
Athlete	Event	Time	Time	Rank	Time	Rank	Time	Rank
Pieter Coetze	Men's 100 m backstroke	52.78	52.90	2 Q	52.63 AF NR	3 Q	52.58 AF NR	5
Pieter Coetze	Men's 200 m backstroke	1:55.85	1:56.92	3 Q	1:56.09	3 Q	1:55.60 AF NR	7
Chad le Clos	Men's 100 m butterfly	51.48	52.24	24	Did not advance			
Matthew Sates	Men's 100 m butterfly	51.66	54.53	35	Did not advance			
Matthew Sates	Men's 200 m butterfly	1:55.25	1:57.04	20	Did not advance			
Matthew Sates	Men's 200 m medley	1:57.72	2:04.01	21	Did not advance			
Tatjana Smith	Women's 100 m breaststroke	1:05.41	1:05.00	1 Q	1:05.00	1 Q	1:05.28	1st place, gold medalist(s)
Tatjana Smith	Women's 200 m breaststroke	2:19.01	2:21.57	1 Q	2:19.94	2 Q	2:19.60	2nd place, silver medalist(s)
Kaylene Corbett	Women's 200 m breaststroke	2:23.71	2:23.85	6 Q	2:22.87	4 Q	2:24.46	7
Erin Gallagher	Women's 100 m butterfly	57.32	57.80	13 Q	57.90	14	Did not advance	
Aimee Canny	Women's 200 m freestyle	1:56.80	1:57.81	14 Q	1:57.34	12	Did not advance	
Rebecca Meder	Women's 200 m medley	2:10.95	2:11.96	16 Q	2:10.67 NR	11	Did not advance	

AF = Africa Record. NR = National Record / South African Record

== Triathlon ==
South Africa entered three triathletes (two men and one woman) in the triathlon events for Paris following the release of the final individual Olympic qualification ranking.

Individual

Athlete	Event	Time						Rank
Athlete	Event	Swim (1.5 km)	Trans 1	Bike (40 km)	Trans 2	Run (10 km)	Total	Rank
Henri Schoeman	Men's	20:11	0:51	52:24	0:25	32:02	1:45:53	20
Jamie Riddle	Men's	20:29	0:55	52:02	0:33	33:16	1:47:15	25
Vicky van der Merwe	Women's	26:09	0:57	1:02:07	0:30	35:33	2:05:16	46

== Wrestling ==
For the first time since 2008, South Africa qualified one wrestler for the Olympic competition. Nicolaas de Lange qualified for the games following the triumph of winning the semifinal round at the 2024 African & Oceania Olympic Qualification Tournament in Alexandria, Egypt.

Key:

- VT (ranking points: 5–0 or 0–5) – Victory by fall.
- VB (ranking points: 5–0 or 0–5) – Victory by injury (VF for forfeit, VA for withdrawal or disqualification)
- PP (ranking points: 3–1 or 1–3) – Decision by points – the loser with technical points.
- PO (ranking points: 3–0 or 0–3) – Decision by points – the loser without technical points.
- ST (ranking points: 4–0 or 0–4) – Great superiority – the loser without technical points and a margin of victory of at least 8 (Greco-Roman) or 10 (freestyle) points.
- SP (ranking points: 4–1 or 1–4) – Technical superiority – the loser with technical points and a margin of victory of at least 8 (Greco-Roman) or 10 (freestyle) points.

Freestyle

Athlete	Event	Round of 16	Quarterfinal	Semifinal	Repechage	Final / BM	
Athlete	Event	Opposition Result	Opposition Result	Opposition Result	Opposition Result	Opposition Result	Rank
Nicolaas de Lange	Men's −97 kg	Matcharashvili (GEO); L 2–12	—N/a		McHedlidze (UKR); L 5–3^{PP}	Did not advance	

== See also ==
- South Africa at the 2024 Summer Paralympics
- South Africa at the 2024 Winter Youth Olympics
