= Mel Janse van Rensburg =

South African Climber

Personal information
- Born: 16 September 2003 (age 22) South Africa
- Education: University of Lyon
- Height: 174 cm (5 ft 9 in)

Climbing career
- Type of climber: Competition climbing; Bouldering; Sport climbing

Mel Janse van Rensburg (born September 16, 2003) is a South African rock climber and competition climber who competed at the Paris 2024 Summer Olympic Games in the combined climbing event for South Africa. He finished last in both the boulder and the lead events in the semifinals, finishing 20th overall out of 20 competitors.

== Early life ==
Mel Janse van Rensburg began climbing at the age of 13.

== Climbing career ==
=== Competition climbing ===
Van Rensburg qualified for the Paris 2024 Summer Olympics through the IFSC African Qualifier 2023 in Pretoria, South Africa. In the Olympics, he finished 20th out of 20 competitors, finishing 6.9 points behind the 19th placed climber, Campbell Harrison.

=== Rock climbing ===
In 2022, Van Rensburg became the first South African to climb a 9a (5.14d) graded sport climbing route when he redpointed Speed Integrale in Switzerland.
