= Sport climbing at the 2024 Summer Olympics – Men's combined =

Men's combined at the Games of the XXXIII Olympiad
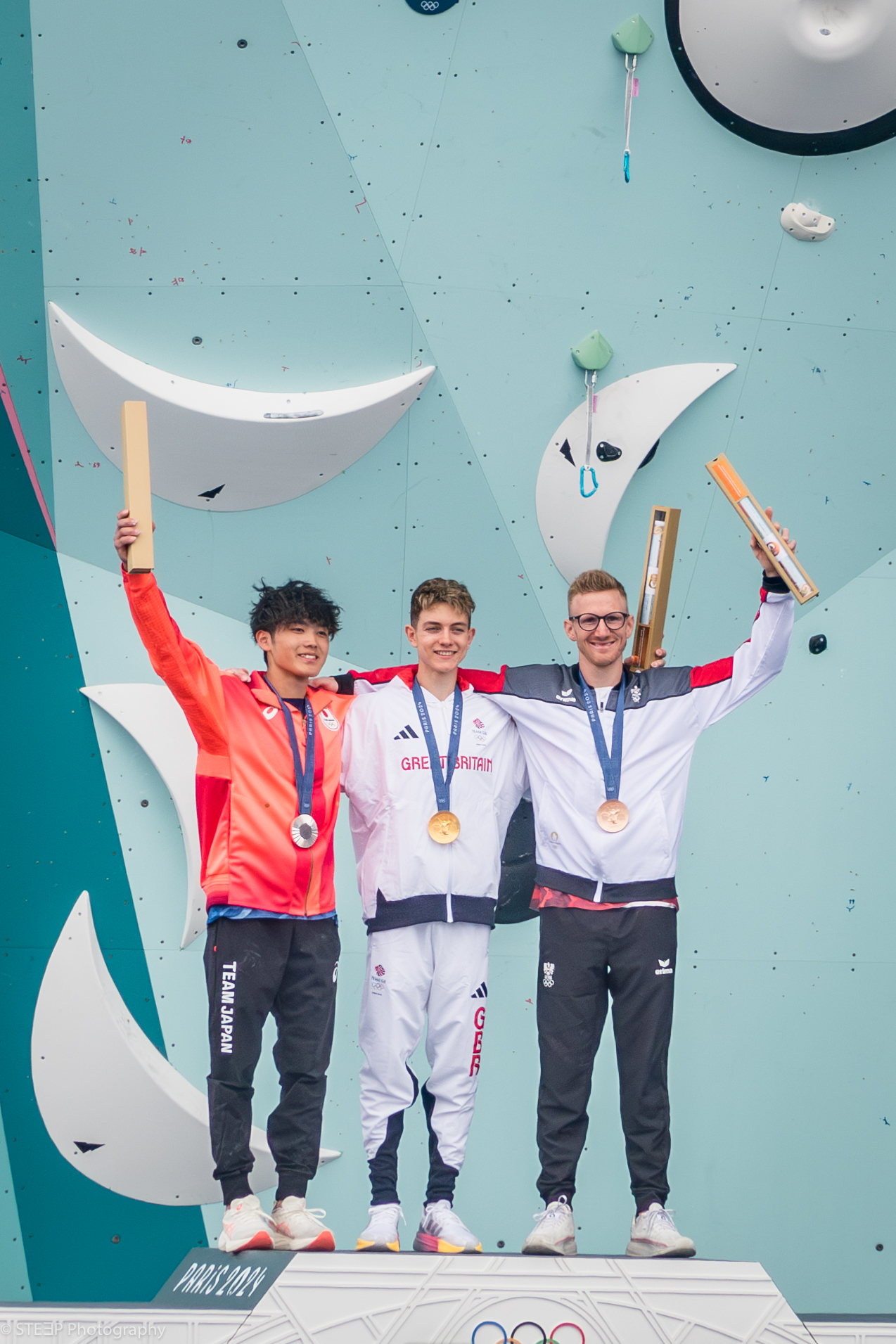
- Olympic sport climbing
- Venue: Le Bourget Sport Climbing Venue, Paris
- Dates: 5-7 August 2024 (semifinals); 9 August 2024 (final)
- Competitors: 20 from 16 nations

Medalists
1st place, gold medalist(s)		Toby Roberts	Great Britain
2nd place, silver medalist(s)		Sorato Anraku	Japan
3rd place, bronze medalist(s)		Jakob Schubert	Austria

The men's competition climbing combined event at the 2024 Summer Olympics took place from 5 to 9 August 2024 at Le Bourget Sport Climbing Venue in Paris. It marked the second Olympics to feature this event as part of the programme. Competition climbing only received one men's event that combined bouldering, lead, and speed climbing at the 2020 Summer Olympics in Tokyo. The 2024 Olympic event retained the bouldering and lead climbing disciplines, while speed climbing was spun off into its own event.

== Schedule ==
All times are Central European Time (UTC+02:00)

Date	Time	Event
5 August 2024	09:00	Boulder Semifinals
7 August 2024	09:00	Lead Semifinals
9 August 2024	09.15	Boulder Final
9 August 2024	11:35	Lead Final

== Results ==
=== Bouldering semifinal ===
The men's bouldering semifinal took place on 5 August 2024.

Rank	Athlete	Boulder				Total
Rank	Athlete	1	2	3	4	Total
1	Sorato Anraku (JPN)	24.9	25.0	9.5	9.6	69.0
2	Tomoa Narasaki (JPN)	9.8	10.0	9.8	24.8	54.4
3	Toby Roberts (GBR)	9.8	9.7	9.9	24.7	54.1
4	Sam Avezou (FRA)	10.0	10.0	4.8	24.4	49.2
5	Adam Ondra (CZE)	9.6	9.6	4.7	24.8	48.7
6	Jakob Schubert (AUT)	24.9	9.9	5.0	4.9	44.7
7	Hannes Van Duysen (BEL)	10.0	9.8	4.8	9.7	34.3
8	Hamish McArthur (GBR)	9.9	10.0	9.3	5.0	34.2
9	Paul Jenft (FRA)	4.9	9.9	9.8	9.5	34.1
10	Lee Dohyun (KOR)	9.6	9.9	9.5	5.0	34.0
11	Colin Duffy (USA)	10.0	9.9	9.1	4.8	33.8
12	Yannick Flohé (GER)	10.0	10.0	4.9	4.8	29.7
13	Pan Yufei (CHN)	4.9	9.6	5.0	9.5	29.0
14	Alberto Ginés López (ESP)	9.9	9.7	4.1	5.0	28.7
15	Alexander Megos (GER)	5.0	9.7	5.0	5.0	24.7
16	Sascha Lehmann (SUI)	4.5	5.0	9.5	5.0	24.0
17	Luka Potočar (SLO)	0.0	9.6	5.0	5.0	19.6
18	Jesse Grupper (USA)	0.0	9.6	4.5	4.8	18.9
19	Campbell Harrison (AUS)	0.0	4.4	0.0	5.0	9.4
20	Mel Janse van Rensburg (RSA)	0.0	0.0	4.7	4.7	9.4

=== Lead semifinal ===
The men's lead semifinal took place on 7 August 2024. Competition was opened by Manuel Cornu.

Rank	Athlete	Lead points		
Rank	Athlete	1	Alberto Ginés López (ESP)	72.0
2	Toby Roberts (GBR)	68.1		
2	Adam Ondra (CZE)	68.1		
4	Sorato Anraku (JPN)	68.0		
5	Paul Jenft (FRA)	57.0		
6	Jakob Schubert (AUT)	54.1		
6	Colin Duffy (USA)	54.1		
8	Hamish McArthur (GBR)	45.1		
9	Yannick Flohé (GER)	39.1		
10	Pan Yufei (CHN)	30.1		
11	Alexander Megos (GER)	24.0		
11	Luka Potočar (SLO)	24.0		
13	Campbell Harrison (AUS)	14.0		
14	Sam Avezou (FRA)	12.1		
14	Sascha Lehmann (SUI)	12.1		
14	Tomoa Narasaki (JPN)	12.1		
17	Lee Dohyun (KOR)	12.0		
17	Jesse Grupper (USA)	12.0		
17	Hannes Van Duysen (BEL)	12.0		
20	Mel Janse van Rensburg (RSA)	7.1		

=== Standings ===
Following both semifinals, the scores for each athlete were combined to calculate a total score. The eight competitors with the highest score qualified for the final.

Rank	Athlete	Total points	Notes
1	Sorato Anraku (JPN)	137.0	Q
2	Toby Roberts (GBR)	122.2	Q
3	Adam Ondra (CZE)	116.8	Q
4	Alberto Ginés López (ESP)	100.7	Q
5	Jakob Schubert (AUT)	98.8	Q
6	Paul Jenft (FRA)	91.1	Q
7	Colin Duffy (USA)	87.9	Q
8	Hamish McArthur (GBR)	79.3	Q
9	Yannick Flohé (GER)	68.8	
10	Tomoa Narasaki (JPN)	66.5	
11	Sam Avezou (FRA)	61.3	
12	Pan Yufei (CHN)	59.1	
13	Alexander Megos (GER)	48.7	
14	Hannes Van Duysen (BEL)	46.3	
15	Lee Dohyun (KOR)	46.0	
16	Luka Potočar (SLO)	43.6	
17	Sascha Lehmann (SUI)	36.1	
18	Jesse Grupper (USA)	30.9	
19	Campbell Harrison (AUS)	23.4	
20	Mel Janse van Rensburg (RSA)	16.5	

=== Final ===
The men's combined lead and bouldering final took place on 9 August 2024.

Rank	Athlete	Nation	Boulder					Lead	Total
Rank	Athlete	Nation	1	2	3	4	Σ	Lead	Total
1st place, gold medalist(s)	Toby Roberts	United Kingdom	24.4	9.0	24.8	4.9	63.1	92.1	155.2
2nd place, silver medalist(s)	Sorato Anraku	Japan	25.0	24.6	9.9	9.8	69.3	76.1	145.4
3rd place, bronze medalist(s)	Jakob Schubert	Austria	24.7	9.3	0.0	9.6	43.6	96.0	139.6
4	Colin Duffy	United States	24.4	9.6	9.8	24.5	68.3	68.1	136.4
5	Hamish McArthur	United Kingdom	24.8	9.8	9.9	9.4	53.9	72.0	125.9
6	Adam Ondra	Czech Republic	9.5	9.8	0.0	4.8	24.1	96.0	120.1
7	Alberto Ginés López	Spain	0.0	4.7	9.8	9.6	24.1	92.1	116.2
8	Paul Jenft	France	4.9	9.7	0.0	9.8	24.4	54.0	78.4

== See also ==
- Sport climbing at the 2024 Summer Olympics – Women's combined
