= Marizen Marais =

South African field hockey player

Personal information
- Born: 17 May 1996 (age 30) South Africa

Sport
- Sport: Field hockey
- Position: Midfield
- Club: Crusaders
Senior career
Years	Team	Caps	Goals
2017-2018	Northern Blues	10	-
2017-2019	Blyde River Bunters	17	-
2017-2021	University of Pretoria	27	-
2022-present	Crusaders	-	-
National team
Years	Team	Caps	Goals
2016	South Africa U–21	10	(6)
2016-present	South Africa	27	(2)
Medal record
Representing South Africa
Women's field hockey
Africa Cup of Nations
Gold medal – first place	2022 Accra
Junior Africa Cup
Gold medal – first place	2016 Windhoek
- Updated on 24 January 2022

Marizen Marais (born 17 May 1996) is a field hockey player from South Africa. In 2020, she was an athlete at the Summer Olympics.

== Personal life ==
Marizen Marais is graduated from the University of Pretoria.

== Career ==
=== Under–21 ===
Marais made her debut for the South Africa U–21 team in 2016, at the Junior Africa Cup in Windhoek. After gaining qualification to the FIH Junior World Cup, she went on to represent the team at the tournament in Santiago.

=== National team ===
Marais made her senior international debut for South Africa in 2016, during the first edition of the Cape Town Summer Series.

In 2019, Marais was a member of the team at the FIH Series Finals in Valencia.

Following a string of good performances, Marais was named to the South Africa team for the 2020 Summer Olympics in Tokyo. She will make her Olympic debut on 24 July 2021, in the Pool A match against Ireland.
