= 2024 Women's Hockey Junior Africa Cup =

10th edition of AHF hockey tournament

2024 Women's Junior Africa Cup

Tournament details
- Host country: Namibia
- City: Windhoek
- Dates: 18–25 April 2025
- Teams: 6 (from 1 confederation)
- Venue: Windhoek High School

Final positions
- Champions: South Africa (8th title)
- Runner-up: Namibia
- Third place: Zimbabwe

Tournament statistics
- Matches played: 17
- Goals scored: 97 (5.71 per match)
- Top scorer: (South Africa) Caylin Maree (10 goals)
- Best player: (South Africa) Ntsopa Mokoena
- Best goalkeeper: (Namibia) Jasmine Cartwright
- Fair play award: Kenya

The 2024 Women's Hockey Junior Africa Cup was the tenth edition of the Women's Junior Africa Cup, the women's international under-21 field hockey championship of Africa, organized by the African Hockey Federation. It was held alongside the men's tournament at Windhoek High School in Windhoek, Namibia from 18 to 25 April 2025.

The tournament served as a direct qualifier for the 2025 Junior World Cup, with the top three teams.

The defending champions South Africa won their eighth title after defeating the hosts Namibia 5–0 in the final.

== Qualified teams ==
The following teams have qualified for the tournament. Ghana withdrew from the tournament due to financial challenges.

~~Ghana~~
Kenya

Head Coach: Rose Mbulo

1. Rebecca Nasambu (GK)
2. Marione Wekesa
4. Velma Otieno
5. Mitchelle Sawanga
6. Wendy Nyongesa
7. Munira Magumba
8. Daughty Ranga (C)
9. Millicent Abukuse
10. Dorah Jokeyo
11. Joyline Jeptoo
12. Brenda Mwagandi
13. Cynthia Auma
14. Irene Senoi
15. Lavenda Ong'ayo
16. Daina Namachanja
17. Faith Amondi
18. Abigael Jelagat
19. Prevon Mukhongo
20. Sharleen Ouma (GK)
Namibia

Head Coach: Sedtric Makati

1. Jasmine Cartwright (GK)
2. Marlene Coetzee
3. Azaylee Philander (C)
4. Tisha Semedo
5. Onique Bezuidenhout
6. Abigail Rowles
7. Marika Neethling
8. Jessica Gresse
9. Nicola Fourie
10. Kyla Gille
11. Alice Rowles
12. Anthea Coetzee
13. Milah Malan
14. Maryke Kruger
15. Annica Higgs
16. Louise McCarthy
17. Mia Karsten
18. Anri Jacobs (GK)
20. Sharleen Ouma (GK)
South Africa

Head Coach: Cindy Brown

1. Lilly-Anne Theron (GK)
2. Paige Salis
4. Germarie Spershott
5. Tara Pakendorf
6. Jodie Blows
8. Amber Fairon
9. Caylin Maree
10. Ané Janse van Vuuren
11. Jenna Blaauw
13. Baylee Engelke
14. Paris-Gail Isaacs
16. Nomsa Mzizi
17. Ntsopa Mokoena
18. Teshawn de la Rey
23. Reabetswe Phume
25. Richele Norval (GK)
27. Ifeoma Ndubueze
28. Angele Vogel
Uganda

Head Coach: Moses Nsereko

1. Hajirah Namwase (GK)
2. Winnie Nandi (C)
3. Stella Nankinga
4. Daniellah Amara
5. Irine Atim
6. Juliet Babirye
7. Anita Atim
8. Hildah Balondemu (C)
9. Jolly Alimo (C)
10. Pauline Ninsiima
11. Nelly Temaiya
12. Juliana Nabatanzi
13. Ingrid Nabayijja
14. Noeline Natabo
15. Destiny Bwengye
16. Janet Nakato
17. Rhemah Ahairwe (GK)
Zambia

Head Coach: Godfrey Lwando

1. Chengelo Chungu (GK)
2. Natasha Malokota
3. Selina Banda
4. Thabita Mwefu (C)
5. Beatrice Mwale (C)
6. Anna Phiri
7. Kaira Naomi
8. Esnart Soko
9. Memory Chaya
10. Rosemary Chanda
11. Mercy Mutambo
12. Salome Mwale
13. Christine Kaluba
14. Prisca Tagwireyi
15. Delphister Miyato
16. Priscilla Chipolepole (GK)
17. Racheal Nakombe
18. Tanisha Patel
Zimbabwe

Head Coach: Bradley Heuer

1. Tinodiwanashe Elijah (C)
2. Mufarowashe Matambo
3. Amber Tozana
4. Ruvarashe Mushavi
5. Nyasha Nyaguze
6. Stephanie Bwerinofa
7. Tayla Ellerman
8. Marilena Fernandes
9. Hannah Godfrey
10. Panaka Kambadza
11. Tanatswa Mukotekwa
12. Tawana Munyawarara
13. Chidochashe Munyonga
14. Mutsawashe Musiyiwa
15. Jessica Orford
16. Janelle Wightman
17. Rebeca Winsor

== Results ==
All times are local (UTC+2).

=== Standings ===
Pos	Team	Pld	W	D	L	GF	GA	GD	Pts	Qualification
1	South Africa	5	5	0	0	39	1	+38	15	Final and 2025 Junior World Cup
2	Namibia (H)	5	4	0	1	25	7	+18	12	Final and 2025 Junior World Cup
3	Zimbabwe	5	3	0	2	17	14	+3	9	Third place match
4	Uganda	5	1	1	3	3	15	−12	4	Third place match
5	Kenya	5	0	2	3	2	12	−10	2	
6	Zambia	5	0	1	4	4	41	−37	1	

Source: FIH
Rules for classification: 1) points; 2) matches won; 3) goal difference; 4) goals for; 5) head-to-head result; 6) field goals for.
(H) Hosts

=== Matches ===
18 April 2025
09:00

South Africa	5–0 Forfeit (Note: Uganda have a delayed flight arrival, so they are missing their first match with South Africa.)	Uganda
	Report

Umpires:
Irene Handura (NAM)
Haitham Selim (EGY)

18 April 2025
11:00

Zimbabwe	8–1	Zambia
Winsor 4'; Kambadza 17', 43'; Matambo 26', 47'; Elijah 34', 55'; Nyaguze 54'	Report	Malokota 13'

Umpires:
Fatma Mahmoud (EGY)
Irene Handura (NAM)

18 April 2025
15:00

Kenya	0–3	Namibia
	Report	Kruger 19'; Semedo 41', 47'

Umpires:
Mari-Elize Swart (RSA)
Shahiela Johari (MAS)

19 April 2025
09:00

South Africa	19–0	Zambia
Maree 7', 19', 33', 42'; Phume 9'; Fairon 14', 60'; Blaauw 16'; Mokoena 26', 53'; Isaacs 32'; Spershott 33', 39', 51'; Vogel 49'; De la Rey 53', 54'; Engelke 56'; Blows 57'	Report

Umpires:
Fatma Mahmoud (EGY)
Kenneth Tamale (UGA)

19 April 2025
17:00

Zimbabwe	0–6	Namibia
	Report	Bezuidenhout 5', 11'; Karsten 14', 41'; Kruger 27'; Neethling 35'

Umpires:
Mari-Elize Swart (RSA)
Shahiela Johari (MAS)

19 April 2025
19:00

Uganda	0–0	Kenya
	Report

Umpires:
Irene Handura (NAM)
Shahiela Johari (MAS)

21 April 2025
09:00

Uganda	1–5	Zimbabwe
Natabo 42'	Report	Elijah 7'; Orford 30'; Tozana 43'; Munyawarara 53', 58'

Umpires:
Irene Handura (NAM)
Linah Barasa (KEN)

21 April 2025
15:00

Kenya	0–4	South Africa
	Report	Isaacs 2'; Salis 13'; Maree 49'; Spershott 58'

Umpires:
Shahiela Johari (MAS)
Kenneth Tamale (UGA)

21 April 2025
19:00

Namibia	11–1	Zambia
Philander 4', 49'; Karsten 5', 20'; Higgs 8'; Neethling 14', 35', 45'; M. Coetzee 29'; Rowles 52', 53'	Report	Chaya 57'

Umpires:
Mari-Elize Swart (RSA)
Fatma Mahmoud (EGY)

22 April 2025
09:00

Zimbabwe	0–5	South Africa
	Report	Salis 8'; De la Rey 39'; Maree 51'; Janse van Vuuren 52'; Spershott 54'

Umpires:
Irene Handura (NAM)
Kenneth Tamale (UGA)

22 April 2025
15:00

Zambia	1–1	Kenya
Kaluba 59'	Report	Mwagandi 26'

Umpires:
Shahiela Johari (MAS)
Mari-Elize Swart (RSA)

22 April 2025
19:00

Namibia	4–0	Uganda
Malan 3'; Kruger 8'; M. Coetzee 41'; Neethling 54'	Report

Umpires:
Fatma Mahmoud (EGY)
Linah Barasa (KEN)

24 April 2025
09:00

Zambia	1–2	Uganda
Mwale 57'	Report	Alimo 3'; Temaiya 17'

Umpires:
Fatma Mahmoud (EGY)
Irene Handura (NAM)

24 April 2025
13:00

Kenya	1–4	Zimbabwe
Namachanja 18'	Report	Elijah 9', 52'; Kambadza 55'; Orford 60+'

Umpires:
Mari-Elize Swart (RSA)
Kenneth Tamale (UGA)

24 April 2025
15:00

South Africa	6–1	Namibia
De la Rey 12', 49'; Mokoena 24'; Maree 31', 35'; Isaacs 38'	Report	Karsten 43'

Umpires:
Shahiela Johari (MAS)
Linah Barasa (KEN)

== Classification round ==
=== Third and fourth place ===
25 April 2025
12:15

Zimbabwe	6–1	Uganda
Elijah 8'; Nyaguze 23'; Tozana 29', 50'; Matambo 40'; Mushavi 48'	Report	Nakato 59'

Umpires:
Irene Handura (NAM)
Mari-Elize Swart (RSA)

=== Final ===
25 April 2025
16:45

South Africa	5–0	Namibia
Maree 21', 34'; Mokoena 33', 56'; Blows 43'	Report

Umpires:
Shahiela Johari (MAS)
Fatma Mahmoud (EGY)

== Statistics ==
=== Final standings ===
Pos	Team	Qualification
1st place, gold medalist(s)	South Africa	2025 Junior World Cup
2nd place, silver medalist(s)	Namibia (H)	2025 Junior World Cup
3rd place, bronze medalist(s)	Zimbabwe	2025 Junior World Cup
4	Uganda	
5	Kenya	
6	Zambia	

Source: FIH
(H) Host

=== Awards ===
The following awards were given at the conclusion of the tournament.

Top Goalscorer	Player of the Tournament	Goalkeeper of the Tournament
(South Africa) Caylin Maree	(South Africa) Ntsopa Mokoena	(Namibia) Jasmine Cartwright

=== Goalscorers ===
There were 97 goals scored in 17 matches, for an average of 5.71 goals per match.

10 goals

- (South Africa) Caylin Maree

6 goals

- (Zimbabwe) Tinodiwanashe Elijah

5 goals

- (Namibia) Mia Karsten
- (Namibia) Marika Neethling
- (South Africa) Teshawn de la Rey
- (South Africa) Ntsopa Mokoena
- (South Africa) Germarie Spershott

3 goals

- (Namibia) Maryke Kruger
- (South Africa) Paris-Gail Isaacs
- (Zimbabwe) Panaka Kambadza
- (Zimbabwe) Mufarowashe Matambo
- (Zimbabwe) Amber Tozana

2 goals

- (Namibia) Onique Bezuidenhout
- (Namibia) Marlene Coetzee
- (Namibia) Azaylee Philander
- (Namibia) Alice Rowles
- (Namibia) Tisha Semedo
- (South Africa) Jodie Blows
- (South Africa) Amber Fairon
- (South Africa) Paige Salis
- (Zimbabwe) Tawana Munyawarara
- (Zimbabwe) Nyasha Nyaguze
- (Zimbabwe) Jessica Orford

1 goal

- (Kenya) Brenda Mwagandi
- (Kenya) Daina Namachanja
- (Namibia) Annica Higgs
- (Namibia) Milah Malan
- (South Africa) Jenna Blaauw
- (South Africa) Baylee Engelke
- (South Africa) Ané Janse van Vuuren
- (South Africa) Reabetswe Phume
- (South Africa) Angele Vogel
- (Uganda) Jolly Alimo
- (Uganda) Janet Nakato
- (Uganda) Noeline Natabo
- (Uganda) Nelly Temaiya
- (Zambia) Memory Chaya
- (Zambia) Christine Kaluba
- (Zambia) Natasha Malokota
- (Zambia) Beatrice Mwale
- (Zimbabwe) Ruvarashe Mushavi
- (Zimbabwe) Rebeca Winsor

Source: FIH

== See also ==
- 2024 Men's Hockey Junior Africa Cup
