= Youth sport in Africa =

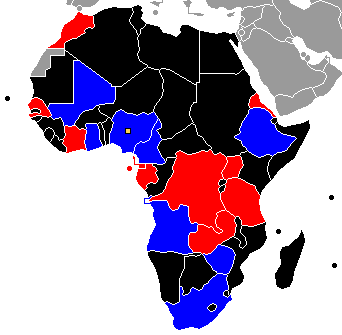
Africa

Youth sport is a growing sector in Africa, including in countries like Nigeria and Senegal.

== Field hockey ==
The African Hockey Federation has held both the Men's Junior Africa Cup and Women's Junior Africa Cup since 1988.

== Handball ==
Many junior and youth African national handball teams have taken part in international tournaments. Such tournaments include:

- The African Men's Junior Handball Championship; qualifying tournament for the IHF Men's U21 Handball World Championship
- The African Men's Youth Handball Championship; qualifying tournament for the IHF Men's U19 Handball World Championship
- The African Women's Junior Handball Championship; qualifying tournament for the IHF Women's U20 Handball World Championship
- The African Women's Youth Handball Championship; qualifying tournament for the IHF Women's U18 Handball World Championship
