= Kayla Swarts =

South Africa field hockey and rugby sevens player

Personal information
- Born: 24 May 2003 (age 23) Bloemfontein. South Africa
- Height: 178 cm (5 ft 10 in)
- Weight: 71 kg (157 lb)
- Field hockey career
- Sport: Field hockey
- Position: Midfielder
- Club: Central
Senior career
Years	Team	Caps	Goals
2022	Maties	-	-
2023	NWU Pukke	-	-
2024–	Central	-	-
National team
Years	Team	Caps	Goals
2023	South Africa U21	10	(1)
2022-present	South Africa	24	(0)
2022-present	South Africa Hockey5	4	(0)
- Updated on 4 March 2025

Rugby union career
National sevens team
Years	Team	Comps
2025-present	South Africa	8 (5)
- Correct as of 9 March 2025
Medal record
Representing South Africa
Women's field hockey
Junior Africa Cup
Gold medal – first place	2023 Ismailia

Kayla Swarts (born 24 May 2003) is a South African field hockey and sevens player for the South African national team.

== Career ==
=== Field hockey ===
==== Under–21 ====
Swarts made her debut for the 2023 Junior Africa Cup in Ismailia and 2023 Hockey Junior World Cup in Santiago.

==== National team ====
Swarts made her debut for the FIH Nations Cup in Valencia.

In 2024 she will become an Olympian, representing South Africa at the XXXIII Olympic Games in Paris.

=== Rugby union ===
==== National sevens team ====
Between 2024, she represented the Springbok Women’s Sevens A team team in the Dubai 7s International tournaments. The 2025 World Rugby Sevens Challenger Series represented the Springbok Women’s Sevens team.

== Personal life ==
She was living with her mother and father, Odessa Swarts (née Krause) and Steven Swarts, in Bloemfontein. Her brother, Wayde van Niekerk also is a South African track and field sprinter who competes in the 200 and 400 metres. She is the cousin of South African World Cup-winning rugby union and rugby sevens player Cheslin Kolbe.

She attended Eunice High School.
