= Zimbabwe women's national under-21 field hockey team =

National U21 sports team

Zimbabwe
- Association: Hockey Association of Zimbabwe
- Confederation: AfHF (Africa)
- Head Coach: Tendayi Maredza

Junior World Cup
- Appearances: 5 (first in 1989)
- Best result: 12th (1989, 2022)
Medal record
Junior Africa Cup
Gold medal – first place	1989
Silver medal – second place	1993 Harare
Silver medal – second place	1997 Harare
Silver medal – second place	2004 Pretoria
Silver medal – second place	2016 Windhoek
Silver medal – second place	2023 Ismailia
Bronze medal – third place	2001 Pretoria
Bronze medal – third place	2024 Windhoek

The Zimbabwe women's national under-21 field hockey team is the national women's team representing Zimbabwe in field hockey.

== Tournament history ==
=== Junior World Cup ===
Junior World Cup record
Year	Host	Round	Pos	Pld	W	D	L	GF	GA	Squad
1989	Ottawa, Canada	Group stage	12th							
1993	Terrassa, Spain	Did not qualify								
1997	Seongnam, South Korea	Did not qualify								
2001	Buenos Aires, Argentina	Did not qualify								
2005	Santiago, Chile	Group stage	16th	3	0	0	3	0	11	Squad
2009	Boston, United States	Did not qualify								
2013	Mönchengladbach, Germany	Did not qualify								
2016	Santiago, Chile	Group stage	16th	3	0	0	3	0	29	Squad
2021	Potchefstroom, South Africa	Group stage	12th	3	1	0	2	2	22	Squad
2023	Santiago, Chile	Group stage	14th	6	0	1	5	2	37	Squad
2025	Santiago, Chile	Group stage	23rd							Squad

=== Junior Africa Hockey Cup ===
- 1989 – (gold)
- 1993 – (silver)
- 1997 – (silver)
- 2001 – (bronze)
- 2004 – (silver)
- 2008 – 5th
- 2012 - 5th
- 2016 - (silver)
- 2021 - Cancelled
- 2023 – (silver)
- 2024 – (bronze)

== FIH Hockey Junior World Cup Current squad ==
The squad was announced on 28 February 2022.

Head coach: Tendayi Maredza

1. Jenna Mathieson (GK)
2. Gugulethu Sibanda
3. Taya Trivella
4. Courtney Lowe
5. Rumbidzai Zimuto
6. Alexi Terblanche
7. Simone Herbst
8. Mazvita Mtausi-Gwaradzimba
9. Georgia Allardice
10. Lilian Pope
11. Mutsa Bera (C)
12. Kaylee Sithole
13. Jorja Jones
14. Natalie Terblanche
15. Khanyisile Mzizi
16. Hayley Clark
17. Mercedes Beekes
18. Lavender Mandoza (GK)
21. Tinodiwanashe Elijah
22. Tatenda Maswera

== Junior Africa Hockey Cup Current squad ==
The squad was announced on 21 December 2022.

Head coach: Bradley Heuer

1. Tanatswa Mutaramuswa (GK)
2. Tanyaradzwa Changa
3. Rumbidzaiishe Zimuto
5. Danielle Lowe
6. Jorja Jones (C)
7. Athina Majiba
9. Ella Allardice
10. Kaylee Sithole
11. Natasha Muwani
12. Done Erasmus
13. Tinodiwanashe Elijah
14. Nakai Mujaranji
15. Khanyisile Mzizi
16. Chelsey-Lee Hares
17. Tumi Sibanda
18. Bethel Chidzwondo (GK)
22. Tatenda Maswera
23. Amber Tozana
