= 2012 Women's Junior Africa cup for Nations =

Junior hockey competition

2012 Women's Hockey Junior Africa Cup for Nations
Tournament details
- Host country: South Africa
- City: Johannesburg
- Dates: 13–20 October
- Teams: 5 (from 1 confederation)
- Venue: Randburg Hockey Stadium

Final positions
- Champions: South Africa (5th title)
- Runner-up: Ghana
- Third place: Namibia

The 2012 Junior Africa Cup for Nations for Nations was the 10 edition of the Women's Africa Cup for Nations, was an international field hockey competition held from 13 to 20 October 2012 in Randburg Hockey Stadium, Johannesburg, South Africa.

The tournament served as a direct qualifier for the 2013 Junior World Cup, with the winner and runner-up qualifying.

== Qualified teams ==
- Ghana
- Kenya
- Namibia
- South Africa
- Zimbabwe

== Results ==
=== Pool Stage ===
Pos	Team	Pld	W	D	L	GF	GA	GD	Pts	Qualification
1	South Africa (H)	4	4	0	0	28	1	+27	12	Medal Round
2	Ghana	4	3	0	1	8	4	+4	9	Medal Round
3	Namibia	4	3	0	1	8	12	−4	9	Medal Round
4	Kenya	4	1	0	3	4	13	−9	3	Medal Round
5	Zimbabwe	4	0	0	4	1	19	−18	0	

Source: Finals time: SA hockey men vs Egypt, SA women vs Ghana
Rules for classification: 1) points; 2) goal difference; 3) goals scored; 4) head-to-head result.
(H) Hosts

==== Matches ====
13 October 2012
12:00

Kenya	2–0	Zimbabwe

Randburg Hockey Stadium

13 October 2012
14:00

Ghana	1–0	Namibia

Randburg Hockey Stadium

14 October 2012
10:00

Ghana	3–0	Zimbabwe

Randburg Hockey Stadium

14 October 2012
14:00

South Africa	9–0	Namibia

Randburg Hockey Stadium

16 October 2012
10:00

Namibia	5–1	Zimbabwe

Randburg Hockey Stadium

16 October 2012
14:00

South Africa	6–1	Kenya

Randburg Hockey Stadium

---

17 October 2012
10:00

Namibia	3–1	Kenya

Randburg Hockey Stadium

17 October 2012
14:00

South Africa	4–0	Ghana

Randburg Hockey Stadium

19 October 2012
10:00

Ghana	4–0	Kenya

Randburg Hockey Stadium

19 October 2012
14:00

South Africa	9–0	Zimbabwe

Randburg Hockey Stadium

=== Classification Stage ===
==== Third and fourth place ====
20 October 2012
09:00

Namibia	1–0	Kenya

Randburg Hockey Stadium

==== Final ====
20 October 2012
14:00

South Africa	4–0	Ghana

Randburg Hockey Stadium

== Statistics ==
=== Final standings ===
Pos	Team	Qualification
1st place, gold medalist(s)	South Africa (H)	2013 Junior World Cup
2nd place, silver medalist(s)	Ghana	2013 Junior World Cup
3rd place, bronze medalist(s)	Namibia	
4	Kenya	
5	Zimbabwe	

(H) Host

== See also ==
- 2012 Men's Junior Africa Cup for Nations

== See also ==
- FIH 2016 Junior African Cup
