= Bethlehem Voortrekker High School =

Coordinates: 28.23807°S 28.29790°E

- Wesweg, Bethlehem, Free State; South Africa

Information
- Type: Public, Boarding
- Motto: NON SIBI SED PATRIAE (Nie vir myself nie, maar vir my vaderland!)
- Established: 1870
- Headmaster: Henco Cronje
- Grades: 8 - 12
- Colors: Black, Yellow and White
- Website: www.voortrekker.co.za

Bethlehem Voortrekker High School is a public co-education dual medium High School situated in Wesweg, Bethlehem, South Africa. Voortrekker High School was founded in 1870 by the Dutch Reformed Church. It was reopened in 1902 after the Anglo Boer War under the leadership of Dr George Clark.

== History ==
Bethlehem Voortrekker High School was established in 1870 by Henco Cronje. In 1936 Voortekker became the first school to register its colors in the Schools Colors Register. In 1938 the school received its name Voortrekker High School. It moved to the new School Building in 1979. It held its centenary celebrations 2002.

== Notable alumni ==
- P. W. Botha
- Tom van Vollenhoven
- Ntsopa Mokoena, South Africa field hockey player
