= Eunice High School (Bloemfontein) =

Location
- 3 Jock Meiring Street, Park West, Bloemfontein; Bloemfontein, Free State; South Africa

Information
- Type: All-girls public school
- Motto: Vincit qui se vincit (She conquers, who conquers herself)
- Established: 5 June 1875; 151 years ago
- Sister school: Eunice Primary School and Eunice Pre-Primary School
- School district: District 9
- Headmaster: Jackie Botma
- Grades: 8–12
- Gender: Female
- Age: 14 to 18
- Language: English
- Schedule: 07:30 - 14:00
- Campus: Urban
- Campus type: Suburban
- Colours: Green, white and gold
- Nickname: Eunice / EHS
- Rival: Oranje Meisie Skool
- Accreditation: Free State Department of Education
- Website: www.ehs.co.za

Eunice High School is a girls' boarding school/day school located in Bloemfontein, South Africa. The language of instruction is English. In 2015 Eunice was recognised as the Top Performing Public School in South Africa.

== History ==
Originally named the Oranje Vrij Staat Dames Instituut, the school was founded in 1875 on the initiative of the Dutch Reformed Church. The name Eunice is a biblical reference to the mother of Timothy in the New Testament. It is a Greek word meaning "happy victory". Eunice was founded in the Scottish education tradition. Its first headmistress was summoned from Stirling to replicate Scottish standards and values in Bloemfontein.

In 1902 Ella Campbell Scarlett became the first and only doctor employed at the school, and is known as the first woman medical practitioner in Bloemfontein, South Africa.

== Notable alumnae ==
- Olga Kirsch, poet
- Kayla Swarts, field hockey
- Taheera Augousti, field hockey

== Sports and culture ==
- Athletics
- Chess
- Choir
- Debating
- Hockey
- Netball
- Swimming
- Public speaking
- Squash
- Tennis

== Subjects ==
- Arts and Culture
- Afrikaans
- Accounting
- Business Studies
- Computer Application Technology
- English
- Life Orientation
- Life Science
- Mathematics
- Mathematical Literacy
- Physical Science
- Technology
- History
