= 2016 Women's Junior Africa cup for Nations =

Field hockey tournament

2016 Women's Junior Africa Cup
Tournament details
- Host country: Namibia
- City: Windhoek
- Dates: 18–28 March
- Teams: 4 (from 1 confederation)
- Venue: Windhoek High School

Final positions
- Champions: South Africa (6th title)
- Runner-up: Namibia
- Third place: Zimbabwe

Tournament statistics
- Matches played: 10
- Goals scored: 130 (13 per match)
- Top scorer: (South Africa) Marie Louw (14 goals)

The 2016 Junior Africa Cup for Nations was an international field hockey competition held from 18 to 28 March 2016 in Windhoek, Namibia.

The tournament served as a direct qualifier for the 2016 Junior World Cup, with the winner and runner-up qualifying.

== Qualified teams ==
- Namibia
- South Africa
- Tanzania
- Zimbabwe

== Results ==
=== Pool Stage ===
Pos	Team	Pld	W	D	L	GF	GA	GD	Pts	Qualification
1	South Africa	3	3	0	0	42	0	+42	9	Semi-finals
2	Namibia (H)	3	2	0	1	21	3	+18	6	Semi-finals
3	Zimbabwe	3	1	0	2	19	10	+9	3	Semi-finals
4	Tanzania	3	0	0	3	0	69	−69	0	Semi-finals

Source: FIH
Rules for classification: 1) points; 2) goal difference; 3) goals scored; 4) head-to-head result.
(H) Hosts

==== Matches ====
18 March 2016
17:30

Tanzania	0-18	Zimbabwe
	Report	Shaxson 4', 65', 67'; Elijah 7', 9', 47', 49', 56'; Hinze 29', 29', 35', 62'; Groenewald 36', 47', 59'; Dollar 45'; Diplock 51'; Nativel 54'

19 March 2016
20:00

Namibia	3-1	Zimbabwe
Brink 9'; Cormack 18'; Heathcote 35'	Report	Diplock 64'

20 March 2016
20:00

Tanzania	0-33	South Africa
	Report	Glasby 5', 27', 57', 65', 67', 69'; Louw 6', 10', 29', 32', 33'; Smith 7', 60'; Fourie 7', 26'; Raubenheimer 12', 23', 24', 25', 44', 67'; Marais 13', 39', 40', 49' van Wyk 16', 16', 37', 54'; Veto 30', 70'; Paton 48'; Dijkstra 51'

21 March 2016
20:00

Namibia	0-2	South Africa
	Report	Etherington 10'; Smith 57'

24 March 2016
19:00

South Africa	7-0	Zimbabwe
Veto 8'; Louw 13', 70'; Smith 29' van Wyk 46', 52'; Glasby 56'	Report

24 March 2016
19:00

Tanzania	0-18	Namibia
	Report	Duvenhage 3', 24', 53'; Cormack 5', 48'; Niemand 9', 16'; Brink 10', 66', 69'; Brits 11', 29', 37', 46'; Barnard 12'; Holz 21'; Kruger 22'; Heathcote 30'

26 March 2016
17:30

South Africa	31-0	Tanzania
Glasby 1', 3', 6', 12', 54', 65'; Fourie 1', 40', 58'; Louw 4', 9', 29', 31', 56'; Marais 7'; Smith 13', 63'; Raubenheimer 16', 32', 33', 45'; Dijkstra 20', 69' van Wyk 23', 42', 50', 64'; Tabata 24'; Esterhuyze 38'; Esteves 47'; Paton 66'	Report

26 March 2016
20:00

Namibia	1-2	Zimbabwe
Brits 8'	Report	Diplock 11'; Campbell 50'

=== Classification Stage ===
Semi-finals
26 March
South Africa	31
Tanzania	0
26 March
Namibia	1
Zimbabwe	2

Final
28 March
South Africa	10
Zimbabwe	0
Third place
27 March
Tanzania	0
Namibia	15

==== Semi-finals ====
26 March 2016
17:30

South Africa	31–0	Tanzania
Glasby 1', 3', 6', 12', 54', 65'; Fourie 1', 40', 58'; Louw 4', 9', 29', 31', 56'; Marais 7'; Smith 13', 63'; Raubenheimer 16', 32', 33', 45'; Dijkstra 20', 69'; Van Wyk 23', 42', 50', 64'; Tabata 24'; Esterhuyze 38'; Esteves 47'; Paton 66'	Report

Umpires:
Silke Pennefather (NAM)
Ivona Makar (CRO)

26 March 2016
20:00

Namibia	1–2	Zimbabwe
Brits 8'	Report	Diplock 11'; Campbell 50'

Umpires:
Vilma Bagdanskiene (LTU)
Claire Cowan (RSA)

==== Third and fourth place ====
27 March 2016
18:00

Tanzania	0–15	Namibia
	Report	Cormack 3'; Duvenhage 5', 45'; S. Ludwig 11'; W. Ludwig 20'; Barnard 22', 54'; Holz 23', 37'; Brink 26'; Krüger 32'; Hermanus 56'; Brits 59'; Heathcote 63'; Gerber 69'

Umpires:
Andrea Nicholson (RSA)
Sharne Mayers (ZIM)

==== Final ====
26 March 2016
09:00

South Africa	10–0	Zimbabwe
Fourie 5', 53'; Smith 14', 47'; Louw 23', 68'; Veto 26'; Dijkstra 56'; Van Wyk 62'; Marais 67'	Report

Umpires:
Ivona Makar (CRO)
Vilma Bagsanskiene (LTU)

== Statistics ==
=== Final standings ===
As per statistical convention in field hockey, matches decided in extra time are counted as wins and losses, while matches decided by penalty shoot-outs are counted as draws.

Pos	Team	Pld	W	D	L	GF	GA	GD	Pts	Qualification
1st place, gold medalist(s)	South Africa	5	5	0	0	83	0	+83	15	2016 Junior World Cup
2nd place, silver medalist(s)	Zimbabwe	5	2	0	3	21	21	0	6	2016 Junior World Cup
3rd place, bronze medalist(s)	Namibia (H)	5	3	0	2	37	5	+32	9	
4	Tanzania	5	0	0	5	0	115	−115	0	

Source: FIH
(H) Hosts

=== Goalscorers ===
There have been 141 goals scored in 10 matches, for an average of 14.1 goals per match.

14 goals

- (South Africa) Marie Louw

13 goals

- (South Africa) Tarryn Glasby

11 goals

- (South Africa) Marguerite van Wyk

10 goals

- (South Africa) Cheneal Raubenheimer

8 goals

- (South Africa) Carmen Smith

7 goals

- (South Africa) Tegan Fourie

6 goals

- (Namibia) Carla Brits
- (South Africa) Marizen Marais

5 goals

- (Namibia) Bernice Brink
- (Namibia) Zalia Duvenhage
- (Zimbabwe) Tinayeishe Elijah

4 goals

- (Namibia) Kiana-Che Cormack
- (South Africa) Alegra Dijkstra
- (South Africa) Nomnikelo Veto
- (Zimbabwe) Amber Hinze

3 goals

- (Namibia) Ashleigh Barnard
- (Namibia) Nicola Heathcote
- (Namibia) Jeani Holz
- (Zimbabwe) Kelly Diplock
- (Zimbabwe) Tyla Groenewald
- (Zimbabwe) Megan Shaxson

2 goals

- (Namibia) Jivanka Kruger
- (Namibia) Zanne-Mari Niemand
- (South Africa) Kristen Paton

1 goal

- (Namibia) Phea Gerber
- (Namibia) Gillian Hermanus
- (Namibia) Sunelle Ludwig
- (Namibia) Wiandri Ludwig
- (South Africa) Priscilla Esterhuyze
- (South Africa) Natalie Esteves
- (South Africa) Amy Etherington
- (South Africa) Sandisiwe Tabata
- (Zimbabwe) Stephanie Campbell
- (Zimbabwe) Jessica Dollar
- (Zimbabwe) Aimee-Beth Nativel

Source: FIH

== See also ==
- FIH 2016 Junior African Cup
