= Taheera Augousti =

South African field hockey player (born 2005)

Personal information
- Born: 23 September 2005 (age 21)

Sport
- Sport: Field hockey
- Position: Midfielder
- Club: Central
National team
| Years | Team | Caps | Goals |
| 2022– | South Africa | 20 | (2) |
| 2023– | South Africa U21 | 4 | (0) |
Medal record
Women's field hockey
Representing South Africa
Africa Cup of Nations
| Gold medal – first place | 2025 Ismailia |
Junior Africa Cup
| Gold medal – first place | 2023 Ismailia |
- Updated on 6 November 2023

Taheera Augousti (born 23 September 2005) is a South African field hockey player for the South African national team.

== Career ==
=== Under–21 ===
Augousti made her debut for the 2023 Junior Africa Cup in Ismailia.

=== National team ===
Augousti made her debut for the FIH Nations Cup in Valencia.

== Personal life ==
She attended Eunice High School.

She is of Cypriot Greek ancestry on her father's side and Cape Malay ancestry on her mother's side.

== Honours ==
- 2023 Junior Africa Cup - Player of the Tournament.
- Free State Sport Award 2023 - Sportswoman of the Year
