= Ntsopa Mokoena =

South African field hockey player

Personal information
- Born: 17 August 2004 (age 22) Bethlehem, South Africa

Sport
- Sport: Field hockey
- Position: Forward
National team
Years	Team	Caps	Goals
2022–	South Africa	54	(14)
2023–	South Africa U21	10	(1)
Medal record
Women's field hockey
Representing South Africa
Africa Cup of Nations
Gold medal – first place	2025 Ismailia
Junior Africa Cup
Gold medal – first place	2023 Ismailia
Gold medal – first place	2024 Windhoek
- Updated on 6 September 2024

Ntsopa Mokoena (born 17 August 2004) is a field hockey player from South Africa, who plays as a forward.

== Personal life ==
Ntsopa Mokoena was born and raised in the Free State city of Bethlehem.

She is a former student of Bethlehem Voortrekker Hoërskool.

== Career ==
=== Senior national team ===
Mokoena received her first call up to the national team during a tour to Spain in December 2022. She made her debut during a test series against Italy, and followed this up with an appearance at the inaugural FIH Nations Cup.

=== Under–21 ===
Mokoena made her debut for the South Africa U–21 in 2023 at the Junior Africa Cup in Ismailia.

==== International goals ====
Goal	Date	Location	Opponent	Score	Result	Competition	Ref.
1	7 December 2022	Estadio Betero, Valencia, Spain	Italy	1–0	5–0	Test Match	
2	7 December 2022	Estadio Betero, Valencia, Spain	Italy	3–0	5–0	Test Match	
3	7 December 2022	Estadio Betero, Valencia, Spain	Italy	5–0	5–0	Test Match	
4	12 December 2022	Estadio Betero, Valencia, Spain	Chile	1–0	1–2	2022 FIH Nations Cup	
