= Women's Junior Africa Cup =

Under-21 field hockey tournament organised by AHF

Women's Hockey Junior Africa Cup
- Most recent season or competition: 2024 Women's Hockey Junior Africa Cup
- Sport: Field hockey
- Founded: 1988; 38 years ago
- First season: 1988
- No. of teams: 6
- Confederation: AfHF (Africa)
- Most recent champion: South Africa (8th title) (2024)
- Most titles: South Africa (8 titles)

The Women's Hockey Junior Africa Cup, formerly known as the Junior Africa Cup of Nations, is a women's international under-21 field hockey tournament organised by the African Hockey Federation. The tournament has been held since 1988 and serves as a qualification tournament for the Women's FIH Hockey Junior World Cup. Competitors must be under the age of 21 as of December 31 in the year before the tournament is held.

== Results ==
Year	Host	Final			Third place match			Number of teams
Year	Host	Winner	Score	Runner-up	Third place	Score	Fourth place	Number of teams
1989; Details		Zimbabwe		Kenya	Only two teams			2
1993; Details	Harare, Zimbabwe	Kenya		Zimbabwe	South Africa	Only three teams		3
1997; Details	Harare, Zimbabwe	South Africa	Round-robin	Zimbabwe	Kenya	Round-robin	Namibia	4
2001; Details	Pretoria, South Africa	South Africa		Egypt	Zimbabwe		Nigeria	4
2004; Details	Pretoria, South Africa	South Africa		Zimbabwe	Namibia		Nigeria	4
2008; Details	Cairo, Egypt	South Africa	6–0	Egypt	Ghana	2–1	Nigeria	5
2012; Details	Randburg, South Africa	South Africa	4–0	Ghana	Namibia	1–0	Kenya	5
2016; Details	Windhoek, Namibia	South Africa	10–0	Zimbabwe	Namibia	15–0	Tanzania	4
2021	Windhoek, Namibia	Cancelled due to the COVID-19 pandemic.			Cancelled			4
2023; Details	Ismailia, Egypt	South Africa	1–0	Zimbabwe	Egypt	2–0	Kenya	4
2024; Details	Windhoek, Namibia	South Africa	5–0	Namibia	Zimbabwe	6–1	Uganda	6
2027; Details	Nairobi, Kenya							

=== Summary ===
Team	Winners	Runners-up	Third place	Fourth place
South Africa	8 (1997, 2001*, 2004*, 2008, 2012*, 2016, 2023, 2024)		1 (1993)	
Zimbabwe	1 (1989)	5 (1993*, 1997*, 2004, 2016, 2023)	2 (2001, 2024)	
Kenya	1 (1993)	1 (1989)	1 (1997)	2 (2012, 2023)
Egypt		2 (2001, 2008*)	1 (2023*)	
Namibia		1 (2024*)	3 (2004, 2012, 2016*)	1 (1997)
Ghana		1 (2012)	1 (2008)	
Nigeria				3 (2001, 2004, 2008)
Tanzania				1 (2016)
Uganda				1 (2024)

* = host nation

=== Team appearances ===
Team	1989	(Zimbabwe) 1993	(Zimbabwe) 1997	(South Africa) 2001	(South Africa) 2004	(Egypt) 2008	(South Africa) 2012	(Namibia) 2016	(Egypt) 2023	(Namibia) 2024	Total
Egypt	–	–	–	2nd	–	2nd	–	–	3rd	–	3
Ghana	–	–	–	–	–	3rd	2nd	–	–	WD	2
Kenya	2nd	1st	3rd	–	–	–	4th	–	4th	5th	5
Namibia	–	–	4th	–	3rd	–	3rd	3rd	–	2nd	4
Nigeria	–	–	–	4th	4th	4th	–	–	–	–	3
South Africa	–	3rd	1st	1st	1st	1st	1st	1st	1st	1st	8
Tanzania	–	–	–	–	–	–	–	4th	–	–	1
Uganda	–	–	–	–	–	–	–	–	–	4th	1
Zambia	–	–	–	–	–	–	–	–	–	6th	1
Zimbabwe	1st	2nd	2nd	3rd	2nd	5th	5th	2nd	2nd	3rd	9
Total	2	3	4	4	4	5	5	4	4	6	

== See also ==
- Men's Junior Africa Cup
- Women's Hockey Africa Cup of Nations
