= Paris-Gail Isaacs =

South African field hockey player (born 2006)

Personal information
- Born: 25 August 2006 (age 20)

Sport
- Sport: Field hockey
- Position: Midfielder/Defender
- Club: Beaulieu
National team
Years	Team	Caps	Goals
2023–	South Africa	15	(1)
2023–	South Africa U21	6	(1)
Medal record
Women's field hockey
Representing South Africa
Junior Africa Cup
Gold medal – first place	2024 Windhoek
- Updated on 27 November 2024

Paris-Gail Isaacs (born 25 August 2006) is a South African field hockey player for the South African national team.

== International career ==
=== Under–21 ===
She made her debut for the South Africa U–21 in 2023 at the FIH Junior World Cup in Santiago.

=== National team ===
She participated at the 2023 African Olympic Qualifier, she competed in the 2024 Summer Olympics.
