= 2023 Women's Hockey Junior Africa Cup =

2023 Women's Junior Africa Cup
Tournament details
- Host country: Egypt
- City: Ismailia
- Dates: 12 March 2023–16 March 2023
- Teams: 4 (from 1 confederation)
- Venue: Suez Canal Authority Stadium

Final positions
- Champions: South Africa (7th title)
- Runner-up: Zimbabwe
- Third place: Egypt

Tournament statistics
- Matches played: 8
- Goals scored: 35 (4.38 per match)
- Top scorer(s): (South Africa) Kutlwano May (South Africa) Tamlyn Kock (Zimbabwe) Tanyaradzwa Changa (4 goals)
- Best player: (South Africa) Taheera Augousti
- Best goalkeeper: (South Africa) Morgan de Jager

The 2023 Junior Africa Cup will be an international field hockey competition held from 12 to 16 March 2023 in Ismailia, Egypt.

The tournament serves as a direct qualifier for the 2023 Junior World Cup, with the winner and runner-up qualifying.

The South Africa won a record seven title by defeating Zimbabwe 1–0 in the final.

== Qualified teams ==
The following teams have qualified for the tournament.

- South Africa
- Kenya
- ~~Nigeria~~
- Zimbabwe
- Egypt

== Results ==
=== Pool Stage ===
Pos	Team	Pld	W	D	L	GF	GA	GD	Pts	Qualification
1	South Africa	3	3	0	0	19	0	+19	9	Final
2	Zimbabwe	3	2	0	1	11	3	+8	6	Final
3	Egypt (H)	3	1	0	2	2	15	−13	3	Third place match
4	Kenya	3	0	0	3	0	14	−14	0	Third place match

Source: FIH
Rules for classification: 1) points; 2) goal difference; 3) goals scored; 4) head-to-head result.
(H) Hosts

==== Matches ====
12 March 2023
10:00

South Africa	3–0	Zimbabwe
Kock 5'; Le Roux 28'; Mokoena 32'	Report

Umpires:
Minami Inamoto (JPN)
Charity Majimbo (KEN)

12 March 2023
12:00

Kenya	0–2	Egypt
	Report	Solaiman 8'; El Fatiri 13'

Umpires:
Andrea Nicholson (RSA)
Sharne Mayers (ZIM)

13 March 2023
10:00

Zimbabwe	4–0	Egypt
Hares 2'; Mujiba 30'; Elijah 45'; Changa 50'	Report

Umpires:
Minami Inamoto (JPN)
Andrea Nicholson (RSA)

13 March 2023
12:00

Kenya	0–5	South Africa
	Report	May 15'; Le Roux 34'; Kock 35', 48'; Coltman 55'

Umpires:
Haitham Selim (EGY)
Sharne Mayers (ZIM)

15 March 2023
12:00

South Africa	11–0	Egypt
May 5', 11', 35'; Maree 13'; Fourie 17', 48'; Fyvie 27'; Kock 28'; Bodibe 31'; Le Roux 45'; Swarts 57'	Report

Umpires:
Charity Majimbo (KEN)
Sharne Mayers (ZIM)

15 March 2023
12:00

Zimbabwe	7–0	Kenya
Sithole 4', 21'; Mzizi 12'; Changa 29'; Elijah 36', 52', 60'	Report

Umpires:
Haitham Selim (EGY)
Minami Inamoto (JPN)

== Final round ==
=== Third and fourth place ===
16 March 2023
10:00

Egypt	2–0	Kenya
Solaiman 23'; Metwally 58'	Report

Umpires:
Andrea Nicholson (RSA)
Sharne Mayers (ZIM)

=== Final ===
16 March 2023
14:30

South Africa	1–0	Zimbabwe
Coltman 48'	Report

Umpires:
Minami Inamoto (JPN)
Charity Majimbo (KEN)

== Awards ==
The following awards were given at the conclusion of the tournament.

Top Goalscorer	Player of the Tournament	Goalkeeper of the Tournament
(South Africa) Kutlwano May	(South Africa) Taheera Augousti	(South Africa) Morgan de Jager (South Africa) Leané McLaren

== Final standings ==
Pos	Team	Qualification
1	South Africa	2023 Junior World Cup
2	Zimbabwe	2023 Junior World Cup
3	Egypt (H)	
4	Kenya	

Source: FIH
(H) Host

== Goalscorers ==
There were 35 goals scored in 8 matches, for an average of 4.38 goals per match.

4 goals

- (South Africa) Tamlyn Kock
- (South Africa) Kutlwano May
- (Zimbabwe) Tinodiwanashe Elijah

3 goals

- (South Africa) Mikkela le Roux

2 goals

- (Egypt) Rowan Solaiman
- (South Africa) Jessie Coltman
- (South Africa) Cerian Fourie
- (Zimbabwe) Tanyaradzwa Changa
- (Zimbabwe) Kaylee Sithole

1 goal

- (Egypt) Sama El Fatiri
- (Egypt) Mayar Metwally
- (South Africa) Katlego Bodibe
- (South Africa) Jenna Fyvie
- (South Africa) Caylin Maree
- (South Africa) Ntsopa Mokoena
- (South Africa) Kayla Swarts
- (Zimbabwe) Chelsey-Lee Hares
- (Zimbabwe) Athina Mujiba
- (Zimbabwe) Khanyisile Mzizi

Source: FIH

== See also ==
- 2023 Men's Hockey Junior Africa Cup
