= Campbell Harrison =

Australian competition climber

Personal information
- Full name: Campbell Lachlan Harrison
- Nationality: Australian
- Born: 28 June 1997 (age 29) Dandenong, Melbourne, Victoria
- Home town: Seaford, Melbourne, Victoria

Climbing career
- Type of climber: Competition climbing; Sport climbing; Bouldering

Sport
- Club: Urban Climb Collingwood

Campbell Lachlan Harrison (born 28 June 1997) is an Australian professional rock climber and competition climber who specialises in the lead climbing and bouldering events.

Harrison was selected to represent Australia at the 2024 Summer Olympics on 25 November 2023, when he took first place at the Oceania Olympic Qualifier in the Lead & Boulder Combined discipline. Harrison's nomination was officially announced by the Australian Olympic Commission on 7 February 2024.

Harrison is the first openly LGBT Olympic competition climber.
