= South Africa women's national under-21 field hockey team =

South African youth field hockey team

South Africa
- Association: South African Hockey Association
- Confederation: AfHF (Africa)
- Head Coach: Stacey-Lee Gedult
Home	Away

Junior World Cup
- Appearances: 8 (first in 1997)
- Best result: 6th (1997, 2001)

Junior Africa Cup
- Appearances: 8 (first in 1993)
- Best result: (gold) 1st (1997, 2001, 2004, 2008, 2012, 2016, 2023)
Medal record
Junior Africa Cup
Gold medal – first place	1997 Harare
Gold medal – first place	2001 Pretoria
Gold medal – first place	2004 Pretoria
Gold medal – first place	2008 Cairo
Gold medal – first place	2012 Johannesburg
Gold medal – first place	2016 Windhoek
Gold medal – first place	2023 Ismailia
Gold medal – first place	2024 Windhoek
Bronze medal – third place	1993 Harare

The South Africa women's national under-21 field hockey team represents South Africa in women's international under-21 field hockey matches and tournaments and is controlled by the South African Hockey Association, the governing body for field hockey in South Africa.

== Tournament history ==
=== Junior World Cup ===
Junior World Cup record
Year	Host	Position	Pld	W	D	L	GF	GA	Squad
1989	Ottawa, Canada	banned (Note: South Africa was banned from international Hockey from 1964 onwards. South Africa was allowed to take part in international competitions from 1993 onwards.)							
1993	Terrassa, Spain	did not qualify							
1997	Seongnam, South Korea	6th	7	2	1	4	17	16	—N/a
2001	Buenos Aires, Argentina	6th	8	3	1	4	7	19	—N/a
2005	Santiago, Chile	8th	8	2	1	5	14	18	Squad
2009	Boston, United States	11th	7	2	0	5	11	26	Squad
2013	Mönchengladbach, Germany	8th	6	1	2	3	16	25	Squad
2016	Santiago, Chile	12th	5	0	2	3	6	20	Squad
2021	Potchefstroom, South Africa	7th	5	2	0	3	4	11	Squad
2023	Santiago, Chile	13th	6	2	1	3	10	14	Squad
2025	Santiago, Chile	15th	6	2	0	4	11	12	Squad
Total		6th place	51	16	8	34	96	161	

=== Junior Africa Cup ===
Junior Africa Cup record
Year	Host	Position
1989	banned	
1993	Harare, Zimbabwe	3rd
1997	Harare, Zimbabwe	1st
2001	Pretoria, South Africa	1st
2004	Pretoria, South Africa	1st
2008	Cairo, Egypt	1st
2012	Johannesburg, South Africa	1st
2016	Windhoek, Namibia	1st
2023	Ismailia, Egypt	1st
2024	Windhoek, Namibia	1st
Best result		1st

== Current squad ==
=== 2025 Junior World Cup squad ===
The squad was announced on 1 October 2025.

Head coach: Cindy Brown

4. Germarie Spershott
5. Tara Pakendorf
6. Leah du Plessis
7. Taheera Augousti
8. Emily Macquet
9. Anja Tromp
10. Ané Janse van Vuuren
11. Thabelani Metu
13. Paris-Gail Isaacs
14. Baylee Engelke
15. Malikah Hamza
16. Nomsa Mzizi
17. Ntsopa Mokoena
18. Teshawn de la Rey
19. Hannah Quinton
24. Reabetswe Phume
25. Richele Norval (GK)
26. Manisha Desai (GK)

== See also ==
- South Africa men's national under-21 field hockey team
- South Africa women's national field hockey team
