= 2005 Women's Hockey Junior World Cup squads =

This article lists the confirmed squads for the 2005 Women's FIH Hockey Junior World Cup tournament held in Santiago, Chile, between 14 and 25 September 2005.

== Pool A ==
=== England ===
Head coach: Karen Brown

1. Emily Cotterill (GK)
2. Kirsty Mackay (GK)
3. Harriet Cunningham
4. Natalie Seymour
5. Alex Danson
6. Ashleigh Ball
7. Hannah MacLeod (C)
8. Crista Cullen
9. Laura Price
10. Beckie Herbert
11. Chloe Rogers
12. Charlotte Hartley
13. Kerry Williams
14. Julie Hope
15. Natasha Brennan
16. Lyndsay French
17. Gemma Darrington
18. Hayley Brown

=== Netherlands ===
Head coach: Robbert Aalbregt

1. Charlotte van der Hulst (GK)
2. Maartje Goderie
3. Mignonne Meekels
4. Carlien Dirkse van den Heuvel
5. Pauline Brugts
6. Renske van Geel
8. Maartje Paumen
9. Maruschka van Soest
10. Eva Bots
11. Jolanda Plijter
12. Karin den Ouden
13. Maureen van Hamel (GK)
14. Alessia Padalino
15. Nienke Kremers
17. Mirjam Sijtsma
18. Vera Vorstenbosch (C)
19. Sophie Polkamp
22. Tessa de Haas

=== United States ===
Head coach: Tracey Fuchs

1. Lauren Ehrlichman (GK)
2. Katie Evans
3. Lori Hillman
5. Jamie Montgomery
6. Katie O'Donnell
7. Katie Grant
8. Cara-Lynn Lopresti
9. Mia Link
11. Michelle Kasold
14. Katelyn Falgowski
15. Amy Stopford
16. Brianna O'Donnell
17. Lauren Crandall
22. Rachel Dawson (C)
23. Lauren Crowley
28. Heather Schnepf
29. Laree Beans
31. Katherine Blair (GK)

=== Zimbabwe ===
Head coach: Eddie Chiringa

1. Sarah Bennett
2. Stephanie Mazingi (GK)
3. Rudo Mawema
4. Amy-Lee Levey
5. Danielle Pycroft
6. Belinda Mannix
7. Faith Musengezi
8. Sarah Blythe-Wood
9. Jenna Palmer (C)
10. Tatenda Chikumbirike
11. Jacquelin Kataneksza
12. Pauline Ndlovu
13. Mutsawashe Mutembwa
14. Ruth Fraser
15. Chantelle Zietsman
16. Stacy Logan
17. Robyn Williams
18. Kundayi Mawema (GK)

== Pool B ==
=== Canada ===
Head coach: Hash Kanjee

1. Danielle Wilson (GK)
2. Amanda Stone (GK)
3. Robyn Evans
5. Alison Lee
6. Thea Culley
7. Lelia Sacre
8. Mary Glen
9. Katie Rushton
11. Tiffany Michaluk
12. Emma Carbery
14. Katie Baker
15. Hilary Linton
16. Megan Anderson
17. Robyn Pendleton
19. Tyla Flexman
19. Karen Mass
21. Jessica Denys (C)
22. Cailie O'Hara

=== Germany ===
Head coach: Michael Behrmann

1. Kristina Reynolds (GK)
2. Victoria Wiedermann (GK)
3. Franziska Stern
4. Pia Eidmann
5. Lydia Morgenstern
6. Lina Geyer
8. Eileen Hoffmann
9. Stefanie Schneider
10. Nina Hasselmann
11. Jennifer Plass
12. Lena Arnold
13. Janne Müller-Wieland
14. Maike Stöckel (C)
15. Silja Lorenzen
17. Lena Jacobi
18. Julia Karwatzky
19. Lea Loitsch
21. Julia Müller

=== India ===
Head coach: Maharaj Krishon Kaushik

1. Rajini Bala (GK)
2. Joydeep Kaur
3. Anjana Barla
5. Asunta Lakra
8. Saravjit Kaur
10. Sarita Lakra
12. Nisha Singh
13. Ranjita Thokchom
14. Rajwinder Kaur
17. Deepika Thakur (C)
18. Jasjeet Kaur Handa
19. Amrita Kaur
21. Gagandeep Kaur
24. Saba Anjum
25. Chanchan Thokchom
26. Guddi Kumari (GK)
27. Ranjita Sanasam
30. Subhadra Pradhan

=== South Africa ===
Head coach: Jennifer King

1. Alana Richardson (GK)
2. Lenise Marais
3. Cindy Brown
4. Natasha Davidson
5. Kara-Lee Botha
6. Kathleen Taylor
7. Danielle Forword
8. Anika Fischer
9. Leslie-Ann George
10. Cindy Hack (C)
12. Illse Davids
13. Vida Ryan
14. Megan Robertson
15. Kim Hubach
17. Marcelle Keet
18. Leandri Steenkamp
25. Liesel Dorothy
26. Anna Botha (GK)

== Pool C ==
=== Argentina ===
Head coach: Ernesto Morlan

1. Belén Succi (GK)
2. Daniela Domínguez
3. Lucía Pereyra
4. Noel Barrionuevo
5. Amalia Ceruttí
6. Pilar Mejíco
7. María Diez
8. Nadia Silva (C)
9. Agustina Bouza
10. María Pallitto
11. Carla Rebecchi
12. Silvina D'Elía
13. Gabriela Aguirre
14. Yanina García
15. Giselle Kañevsky
16. Inés Garmendia
17. Rosario Luchetti
18. María Mutio (GK)

=== Belarus ===
Head coach: Samvel Kahramanian

1. Tatiana Fedchenka (C) (GK)
2. Maryia Halinouskaya
3. Alena Yanubayeva
4. Hanna Zabrotskaya
5. Olga Tarshchyk
6. Liudmila Dabrylka
7. Hanna Lupach
8. Natalia Varabyova
9. Ryta Zhylianina
10. Yulia Piatrova
11. Nastassia Shcharbakova
12. Sviatlana Bahushevich
13. Yuliya Mikheichyk
14. Krestina Kulinkovich
15. Alena Chadayeva
16. Alena Alshevskaya

=== Scotland ===
Head coach: Keith Joss

1. Catherine Rae (GK)
2. Claire Ritchie (GK)
3. Nikki Kidd
4. Clare Scott
5. Kim Christison
6. Lee Pendreigh
7. Katie Mackay
8. Catriona Ralph
9. Kirsty Nolan
10. Holly Cram (C)
11. Aimee Clark
12. Alison Bell
13. Nicole Scott
14. Leigh Fawcett
15. Susan Hamilton
16. Laura Wrightson
18. Aisling Coyle
21. Kim MacGregor

=== South Korea ===
Head coach: Park Shin-Heum

1. Oh Jin-Kyung (GK)
2. Kim Kyung-A
3. Park Young-Soon
4. Cha Se-Na
5. Han Hye-Lyoung
6. Choi Eun-Young
7. Kim Jin-Ju
8. Jeong Jin-Ok (C)
9. Eum Mi-Young
10. Park Mi-Hyun
11. Kim Bo-Mi
12. Han Tae-Jeong
13. Kim Da-Rae
14. Im Mi-Ra
15. Seo Hye-Jin
16. Eo Young-Jin (GK)
17. Kim Young-Ran
18. Kim Jong-Eun

== Pool D ==
=== Australia ===
Head coach: Neil Hawgood

1. Kary Chau
2. Fiona Boyce
3. Jane Bennett (C)
4. Madonna Blyth
5. Jade Close
7. Kathryn Hubble (GK)
8. Susannah Harris
9. Shelly Liddelow
10. Amy Korner
11. Rheannin Kelly
12. Rachael Lynch (GK)
13. Kobie McGurk
14. Casey Eastham
15. Lisa Pamenter
16. Emma Paterson
17. Jayde Taylor
18. Jacklyn McRae
19. Kate Hollywood

=== Chile ===
Head coach: Alfredo Castro

1. Constanza Abud (GK)
2. Sofía Walbaum
3. Andrea Sánchez
4. Alexandra Sclabos
5. Catalina Thiermann
6. Francisca Pizarro
7. Denise Infante
8. Carolina García (C)
9. Camila Infante
10. María Fernández
11. Beatriz Albertz
12. Claudia Schüler (GK)
13. Veronica Bosch
14. Cristina Wagner
15. Daniela Caram
16. Fernanda Carvajal
17. Pilar Donoso
18. Francisca Flores

=== China ===
Head coach: Jin Jlanmin

1. Du Wei (GK)
3. Li Boyan
4. Zhang Yan
5. Wang Ying
6. Hu Pan
7. Sun Sinan (C)
8. Li Xiaoning
9. Luan Haiyan
10. Wang Mengyu
11. Wang Mengyu
12. Fu Yu
14. Zhao Lixin
15. Zhang Yudiao
18. Li Ji (C)

=== Spain ===
Head coach: Angel Laso

1. María López (GK)
2. Julia Menéndez
3. Rocío Ybarra
4. Gemma Bernad
5. Marta Ejarque
6. Marta Fàbregas
7. Sara Pérez
8. Olalla Piniero
9. María Romagosa
10. María Gómez
11. Barbara Malda
12. Rocío Gutiérrez
13. María Contardí
15. Paula Dabanch
17. Gloria Comerma
18. Sumi Aoki
19. Margallo Leyre (GK)
21. Esther Termens (C)
