= 2005 Women's Hockey Junior World Cup =

International field hockey competition

Junior Hockey World Cup 2005

Tournament details
- Host country: Chile
- City: Santiago
- Dates: 14–25 September
- Teams: 16
- Venue: Club Deportivo Manquehue

Final positions
- Champions: South Korea (2nd title)
- Runner-up: Germany
- Third place: Netherlands

Tournament statistics
- Matches played: 62
- Goals scored: 242 (3.9 per match)
- Top scorer: (Netherlands) Maartje Paumen (11 goals)
- Best player: (Netherlands) Maartje Goderie
- Best goalkeeper: (Germany) Kristina Reynolds

The 2005 Women's Hockey Junior World Cup was the 5th edition of the Women's Hockey Junior World Cup. It was held from 14 to 25 September 2005 in Santiago, Chile.

South Korea won the tournament for the second time after defeating Germany 1–0 in the final. The Netherlands won the third-place match by defeating Australia 2–1 in the third and fourth place playoff.

== Qualification ==
Each continental federation received a number of quotas depending on the FIH World Rankings for teams qualified through their junior continental championships. Alongside the host nation, 16 teams competed in the tournament.

Dates	Event	Location	Quotas	Qualifier(s)
Host nation			1	Chile
25–31 July 2004	2004 EuroHockey Junior Championship	Dublin, Ireland	6	Belarus; England; Germany; Netherlands; Scotland; Spain
13–17 September 2004	2004 Junior Africa Cup	Pretoria, South Africa	2	South Africa; Zimbabwe
30 October – 3 November 2004	2004 Junior Asia Cup	Hyderabad, India	3	China; India; South Korea
7–11 December 2004	2004 Junior Oceania Cup	Wellington, New Zealand	1	Australia
16–27 March 2005	2005 Pan American Junior Championship	San Juan, Puerto Rico	3	Argentina; Canada; United States

== Results ==
All times are Chile Time (UTC−03:00)

=== First round ===
==== Pool A ====
Pos	Team	Pld	W	D	L	GF	GA	GD	Pts	Qualification
1	United States	3	2	1	0	20	4	+16	7	Medal round
2	Netherlands	3	2	1	0	16	2	+14	7	Medal round
3	England	3	1	0	2	15	5	+10	3	Medal round
4	Zimbabwe	3	0	0	3	0	40	−40	0	

Rules for classification: 1) points; 2) goal difference; 3) goals scored; 4) head-to-head result.

14 September 2005
09:30

United States	4–2	England
Crandall 23'; Dawson 33'; K. O'Donnell 53', 69'	Report	Cunningham 15'; Brown 63'

Umpires:
Jean Duncan (SCO)
Cecilia Valenzuela (CHL)

14 September 2005
11:30

Zimbabwe	0–13	Netherlands
	Report	Vorstenbosch 6', 12'; Paumen 7', 29', 31', 62', 69'; Padalino 11', 46'; Plijter 21' de Haas 39', 43'; Sijtsma 61'

Umpires:
Renate Peters (GER)
Corrine Cornelius (RSA)

15 September 2005
10:00

Netherlands	2–2	United States
Paumen 3', 59'	Report	Crandall 46'; Lopresti 66'

Umpires:
Soledad Iparraguirre (ARG)
Alicia Takeda (MEX)

15 September 2005
13:00

England	13–0	Zimbabwe
Brown 2', 6', 59'; MacLeod 10'; Danson 20', 33', 54'; Hope 29', 65', 69'; Hartley 57'; Cullen 60'; Rogers 62'	Report

Umpires:
Lisa Roach (AUS)
Carolina de la Fuente (ARG)

17 September 2005
12:00

Zimbabwe	0–14	United States
	Report	Grant 9'; Link 13', 40'; Lopresti 28'; Ehrlichman 32'; Kasold 35'; Beans 42'; Crandall 45', 54'; Whitten 46'; Falgowski 49'; Evans 53', 62'; Dawson 62'

Umpires:
Corinne Cornelius (RSA)
Chieko Akiyama (JPN)

17 September 2005
19:00

England	0–1	Netherlands
	Report	Paumen 6'

Umpires:
Julie Ashton-Lucy (AUS)
Carol Metchette (IRL)

==== Pool B ====
Pos	Team	Pld	W	D	L	GF	GA	GD	Pts	Qualification
1	Germany	3	3	0	0	13	4	+9	9	Medal round
2	South Africa	3	1	1	1	7	7	0	4	Medal round
3	India	3	1	1	1	6	6	0	4	Medal round
4	Canada	3	0	0	3	2	11	−9	0	

Rules for classification: 1) points; 2) goal difference; 3) goals scored; 4) head-to-head result.

14 September 2005
12:30

India	1–1	South Africa
Anjum 32'	Report	Davids 5'

Umpires:
Julie Ashton-Lucy (AUS)
Tracy Wrigley (NZL)

14 September 2005
13:30

Canada	0–4	Germany
	Report	Stockel 9', 21'; Stern 18'; Hoffmann 43'

Umpires:
Jun Kentwell (USA)
Alison Hill (ENG)

15 September 2005
12:00

India	4–1	Canada
Handa 4'; Lakra 6'; Anjum 17', 26'	Report	Mann 69'

Umpires:
Hongjun Yao (CHN)
Jean Duncan (SCO)

15 September 2005
14:00

Germany	5–3	South Africa
Karwatzky 10'; Hoffmann 16', 52'; Muller 32'; Stockel 57'	Report	Robertson 9'; Brown 21'; George 67'

Umpires:
Cecilia Valenzuela (CHL)
Stella Bartlema (NED)

17 September 2005
11:00

Germany	4–1	India
Eidmann 3'; Muller 13', 15'; Stockel 61'	Report	Thakur 54'

Umpires:
Keely Dunn (CAN)
Soledad Iparraguirre (ARG)

17 September 2005
13:00

South Africa	3–1	Canada
Brown 28'; Dorothy 48', 60'	Report	Lee 47'

Umpires:
Carolina de la Fuente (ARG)
Lee Keum-Ju (KOR)

==== Pool C ====
Pos	Team	Pld	W	D	L	GF	GA	GD	Pts	Qualification
1	Argentina	3	3	0	0	8	1	+7	9	Medal round
2	South Korea	3	2	0	1	9	2	+7	6	Medal round
3	Scotland	3	1	0	2	2	8	−6	3	Medal round
4	Belarus	3	0	0	3	1	9	−8	0	

Rules for classification: 1) points; 2) goal difference; 3) goals scored; 4) head-to-head result.

14 September 2005
14:30

Argentina	5–1	Belarus
D'Elia 9', 16', 45'; Barrionuevo 21'; Garcia 52'	Report	Piatrova 34'

Umpires:
Chieko Akiyama (JPN)
Alicia Takeda (MEX)

14 September 2005
15:30

South Korea	6–1	Scotland
Kim Ji. 5'; Han H. 28'; Kim B. 38'; Im 41'; Park M. 56'; Kim Y. 65'	Report	Clark 70'

Umpires:
Stella Bartlema (NED)
Lisa Roach (AUS)

15 September 2005
15:00

Belarus	0–3	South Korea
	Report	Kim Jo. 15'; Park Y. 20', 41'

Umpires:
Jun Kentwell (USA)
Julie Ashton-Lucy (AUS)

15 September 2005
16:00

Scotland	0–2	Argentina
	Report	Luchetti 25'; Rebecchi 66'

Umpires:
Anupama Puchimanda (IND)
Renate Peters (RSA)

17 September 2005
09:00

Argentina	1–0	South Korea
Garcia 60'	Report

Umpires:
Jean Duncan (SCO)
Lisa Roach (AUS)

17 September 2005
17:00

Belarus	0–1	Scotland
	Report	Kidd 25'

Umpires:
Alison Hill (ENG)
Cecilia Valenzuela (CHL)

==== Pool D ====
Pos	Team	Pld	W	D	L	GF	GA	GD	Pts	Qualification
1	Spain	3	2	1	0	6	4	+2	7	Medal round
2	Australia	3	2	0	1	6	3	+3	6	Medal round
3	Chile	3	1	1	1	6	5	+1	4	Medal round
4	China	3	0	0	3	1	7	−6	0	

Rules for classification: 1) points; 2) goal difference; 3) goals scored; 4) head-to-head result.

14 September 2005
17:30

Australia	1–2	Spain
Korner 42'	Report	Romagosa 13', 26'

Umpires:
Carolina de la Fuente (ARG)
Carol Metchette (IRL)

14 September 2005
20:00

Chile	3–0	China
Albertz 7', 10'; Caram 34'	Report

Umpires:
Soledad Iparraguirre (ARG)
Lee Keum-Ju

15 September 2005
18:00

China	0–2	Australia
	Report	Korner 8'; Harris 34'

Umpires:
Alison Hill (ENG)
Chieko Akiyama (JPN)

15 September 2005
20:00

Spain	2–2	Chile
Romagosa 64'; Gomez 66'	Report	García 30'; Albertz 33'

Umpires:
Keely Dunn (CAN)
Corrine Cornelius (RSA)

17 September 2005
14:00

China	1–2	Spain
Zhao Lixin 64'	Report	Romagosa 6'; Contardi 13'

Umpires:
Tracy Wrigley (NZL)
Alicia Takeda (MEX)

17 September 2005
15:00

Chile	1–3	Australia
Fernandez 42'	Report	Liddelow 16', 59'; Hollywood 46'

Umpires:
Renate Peters (RSA)
Stella Bartlema (NED)

=== Medal round ===
==== Pool E ====
Pos	Team	Pld	W	D	L	GF	GA	GD	Pts	Qualification
1	Netherlands	5	3	2	0	9	5	+4	11	Semi-finals
2	Australia	5	3	0	2	11	7	+4	9	Semi-finals
3	Spain	5	2	3	0	11	8	+3	9	
4	United States	5	2	2	1	13	10	+3	8	
5	England	5	1	0	4	5	12	−7	3	
6	Chile	5	0	1	4	5	12	−7	1	

Rules for classification: 1) points; 2) goal difference; 3) goals scored; 4) head-to-head result.

18 September 2005
14:00

United States	3–1	Chile
K. O'Donnell 42', 65'; Crandall 58'	Report	Infante 25'

Umpires:
Alison Hill (ENG)
Lisa Roach (AUS)

18 September 2005
18:00

Australia	2–3	Netherlands
Kelly 10'; McGurk 25'	Report	Dirkse van den Heuvel 34'; Paumen 48'; Vorstenbosch 70'

Umpires:
Soledad Iparraguirre (ARG)
Jean Duncan (SCO)

18 September 2005
20:00

Spain	2–0	England
Gomez 51'; Aoki 59'	Report

Umpires:
Carolina de la Fuente (ARG)
Chieko Akiyama (JPN)

20 September 2005
15:00

Australia	1–0	United States
Blyth 69'	Report

Umpires:
Lee Keum-Ju (KOR)
Corrine Cornelius (RSA)

20 September 2005
17:00

Netherlands	1–1	Spain
Padalino 41'	Report	Romagosa 24'

Umpires:
Lisa Roach (AUS)
Chieko Akiyama (JPN)

20 September 2005
19:00

Chile	1–2	England
García 13'	Report	Brown 16'; Herbert 55'

Umpires:
Carolina de la Fuente (ARG)
Julie Ashton-Lucy (AUS)

21 September 2005
16:00

Spain	4–4	United States
Romagosa 2', 16'; Comerma 46'; Contardi 53'	Report	Falgowski 9'; Grant 48'; Crandall 55', 67'

Umpires:
Julie Ashton-Lucy (AUS)
Carol Metchette (IRL)

21 September 2005
18:00

England	1–4	Australia
Danson 69'	Report	Liddelow 27'; Korner 36', 66'; Hollywood 69'

Umpires:
Soledad Iparraguirre (ARG)
Renate Peters (RSA)

21 September 2005
20:00

Chile	0–2	Netherlands
	Report	Plijter 55', 65'

Umpires:
Alison Hill (ENG)
Lee Keum-Ju (KOR)

==== Pool F ====
Pos	Team	Pld	W	D	L	GF	GA	GD	Pts	Qualification
1	Germany	5	4	0	1	14	6	+8	12	Semi-finals
2	South Korea	5	3	1	1	12	5	+7	10	Semi-finals
3	Argentina	5	3	1	1	5	2	+3	10	
4	South Africa	5	1	1	3	9	11	−2	4	
5	India	5	0	4	1	5	8	−3	4	
6	Scotland	5	0	1	4	3	16	−13	1	

Rules for classification: 1) points; 2) goal difference; 3) goals scored; 4) head-to-head result.

18 September 2005
10:00

South Korea	2–1	Germany
Eum 61'; Park M. 64'	Report	Hoffmann 4'

Umpires:
Julie Ashton-Lucy (AUS)
Corrine Cornelius (RSA)

18 September 2005
12:00

Argentina	0–0	India
	Report

Umpires:
Carol Metchette (IRL)
Lee Keum-Ju (KOR)

18 September 2005
16:00

South Africa	4–1	Scotland
Dorothy 13', 67'; George 31'; Robertson 61'	Report	Christison 70'

Umpires:
Keely Dunn (CAN)
Tracy Wrigley (NZL)

20 September 2005
09:00

Scotland	1–1	India
MacGregor 67'	Report	Handa 58'

Umpires:
Stella Bartlema (NED)
Jun Kentwell (USA)

20 September 2005
11:00

South Korea	2–0	South Africa
Kim Jo. 55'; Park 67'	Report

Umpires:
Carol Metchette (IRL)
Soledad Iparraguirre (ARG)

20 September 2005
13:00

Argentina	0–1	Germany
	Report	Stöckel 9'

Umpires:
Jean Duncan (SCO)
Alison Hill (ENG)

21 September 2005
10:00

India	2–2	South Korea
Lakra 9'; Handa 44'	Report	Park Y. 29', 70+'

Umpires:
Lisa Roach (AUS)
Cecilia Valenzuela (CHL)

21 September 2005
12:00

South Africa	1–2	Argentina
Forword 5'	Report	Mejico 42'; Garmendia 45'

Umpires:
Chieko Akiyama (JPN)
Stella Bartlema (NED)

21 September 2005
14:00

Germany	3–0	Scotland
Hoffmann 16', 62'; Muller 59'	Report

Umpires:
Alicia Takeda (MEX)
Carolina de la Fuente (ARG)

=== Non-Medal Round ===
==== Pool G ====
Pos	Team	Pld	W	D	L	GF	GA	GD	Pts
1	China	3	2	1	0	8	2	+6	7
2	Belarus	3	2	0	1	7	8	−1	6
3	Canada	3	1	1	1	10	4	+6	4
4	Zimbabwe	3	0	0	3	0	11	−11	0

Rules for classification: 1) points; 2) goal difference; 3) goals scored; 4) head-to-head result.

18 September 2005
13:00

Canada	7–0	Zimbabwe
Carbery 11'; Culley 17', 54', 57'; O'Hara 25'; Baker 36'; Anderson 60'	Report

Umpires:
Hongjun Yao (CHN)
Jun Kentwell (USA)

18 September 2005
15:00

Belarus	1–6	China
Piatrova 38'	Report	Li Boyan 4', 67'; Zhao Lixin 24', 27', 63'; Wang Ying 60'

Umpires:
Anupama Puchimanda (IND)
Renate Peters (RSA)

20 September 2005
12:00

Belarus	3–2	Canada
Varabyova 30', 34'; Basarevskaya 48'	Report	Pendleton 25', 62'

Umpires:
Alicia Takeda (MEX)
Tracy Wrigley (NZL)

20 September 2005

Zimbabwe	0–1	China
	Report	Zhao Lixin 54'

Umpires:
Cecilia Valenzuela (CHL)
Keely Dunn (CAN)

21 September 2005
13:00

Belarus	3–0	Zimbabwe
Bahushevich 4', 45'; Alshevskaya 57'	Report

Umpires:
Hongjun Yao (CHN)
Corrine Cornelius (RSA)

21 September 2005
15:00

China	1–1	Canada
Luan Haiyan 49'	Report	Mann 56'

Umpires:
Anupama Puchimanda (IND)
Jean Duncan (SCO)

=== Thirteenth to sixteenth place classification ===
==== Fifteenth and sixteenth place ====
24 September 2005
11:00

Canada	4–0	Zimbabwe
Pendleton 23'; Michaluk 25', 63'; Rushton 42'	Report

Umpires:
Stella Bartlema (NED)
Tracy Wrigley (NZL)

==== Thirteenth and fourteenth place ====
24 September 2005
13:30

China	2–0	Belarus
Fu Yu 32'; Zhao Lixin 39'	Report

Umpires:
Keely Dunn (CAN)
Chieko Akiyama (JPN)

=== Ninth to twelfth place classification ===
Crossover
23 September 2005
India	1
Chile	3
23 September 2005
England	3
Scotland	2

Ninth and Tenth Place
24 September 2005
Chile	1
England	4
Eleventh and Twelfth Place
24 September 2005
India	3
Scotland	1

==== Crossover ====
23 September 2005
09:30

India	1–3	Chile
Anjum 52'	Report	Caram 26'; Albertz 44', 61'

Umpires:
Renate Peters (RSA)
Corrine Cornelius (RSA)

23 September 2005
11:00

England	3–2	Scotland
Brennan 15'; Cullen 35+'; MacLeod 41'	Report	Cram 29'; Kidd 66'

Umpires:
Chieko Akiyama (JPN)
Stella Bartlema (NED)

==== Eleventh and twelfth place ====
24 September 2005
16:00

India	3–1	Scotland
Lakra 4', 43'; Anjum 61'	Report	Wrightson 30'

Umpires:
Renate Peters (RSA)
Corrine Cornelius (RSA)

==== Ninth and tenth place ====
24 September 2005
18:30

Chile	1–4	England
Caram 13'	Report	Danson 21', 42'; Hartley 32'; Cullen 52'

Umpires:
Julie Ashton-Lucy (AUS)
Soledad Iparraguirre (ARG)

=== Fifth to eighth place classification ===
Crossover
23 September 2005
Argentina	2
United States	0
23 September 2005
Spain	2
South Africa	0

Fifth and Sixth Place
25 September 2005
Argentina	2
Spain	1
Seventh and Eighth Place
25 September 2005
United States	4
South Africa	2

==== Crossover ====
23 September 2005
12:00

Argentina	2–0	United States
Pallitto 67'; Aguirre 69'	Report

Umpires:
Jean Duncan (SCO)
Carol Metchette (IRL)

23 September 2005
14:30

Spain	2–0	South Africa
Romagosa 9'; Gomez 12'	Report

Umpires:
Alison Hill (ENG)
Lisa Roach (AUS)

==== Seventh and eighth place ====
25 September 2005
09:00

United States	4–2	South Africa
Link 3'; Crandall 15'; Beans 18'; K. O'Donnell 46'	Report	Forword 4'; Davids 69'

Umpires:
Lee Keum-Ju (KOR)
Carol Metchette (IRL)

==== Fifth and sixth place ====
25 September 2005
10:00

Argentina	2–1	Spain
Pallitto 23'; Rebecchi 70'	Report	Termens 16'

Umpires:
Lisa Roach (AUS)
Jean Duncan (SCO)

=== First to fourth place classification ===
Semi-finals
23 September 2005
Germany (p.s.o)	0 (4)
Australia	0 (3)
23 September 2005
Netherlands	1
South Korea (a.e.t)	2

Final
25 September 2005
Germany	0
South Korea	1
Third and fourth place
25 September 2005
Australia	1
Netherlands	2

==== Semi-finals ====
23 September 2005
17:00

Germany	0–0	Australia
	Report
Penalties
Morgenstern (penalty shoot-out scored); Jacobi (penalty shoot-out scored); Plass (penalty shoot-out missed); Karwatzky (penalty shoot-out scored); Loitsch (penalty shoot-out scored)	4–3	(penalty shoot-out scored) Close; (penalty shoot-out missed) Hollywood; (penalty shoot-out scored) Paterson; (penalty shoot-out missed) Taylor; (penalty shoot-out scored) Kelly

Umpires:
Jean Duncan (SCO)
Carol Metchette (IRL)

23 September 2005
19:30

Netherlands	1–2 (a.e.t.)	South Korea
Paumen 33'	Report	Han T. 35'; Kim Ji. 82'

Umpires:
Julie Ashton-Lucy (AUS)
Carolina de la Fuente (ARG)

==== Third and fourth place ====
25 September 2005
12:30

Australia	1–2	Netherlands
Hollywood 25'	Report	Padalino 10'; Paumen 52'

Umpires:
Carolina de la Fuente (ARG)
Alison Hill (ENG)

==== Final ====
25 September 2005
15:00

Germany	0–1	South Korea
	Report	Jeong 51'

Umpires:
Julie Ashton-Lucy (AUS)
Soledad Iparraguirre (ARG)

== Awards ==
Topscorer	Best Player	Best Goalkeeper	Fair Play
(Netherlands) Maartje Paumen	(Netherlands) Maartje Goderie	(Germany) Kristina Reynolds	Canada

== Statistics ==
=== Final rankings ===
As per statistical convention in field hockey, matches decided in extra time are counted as wins and losses, while matches decided by penalty shoot-outs are counted as draws.

Pos	Team	Pld	W	D	L	GF	GA	GD	Pts	Final result
1st place, gold medalist(s)	South Korea	8	6	1	1	18	6	+12	19	Gold Medal
2nd place, silver medalist(s)	Germany	8	5	1	2	18	7	+11	16	Silver Medal
3rd place, bronze medalist(s)	Netherlands	8	5	2	1	25	8	+17	17	Bronze Medal
4	Australia	8	4	1	3	14	9	+5	13	Fourth place
5	Argentina	8	6	1	1	14	4	+10	19	Eliminated in medal round
6	Spain	8	4	3	1	16	11	+5	15	Eliminated in medal round
7	United States	8	4	2	2	31	14	+17	14	Eliminated in medal round
8	South Africa	8	2	1	5	14	18	−4	7	Eliminated in medal round
9	England	8	4	0	4	25	15	+10	12	Eliminated in medal round
10	Chile	8	2	1	5	12	17	−5	7	Eliminated in medal round
11	India	8	2	4	2	13	13	0	10	Eliminated in medal round
12	Scotland	8	1	1	6	7	22	−15	4	Eliminated in medal round
13	China	7	3	1	3	11	9	+2	10	Eliminated in group stage
14	Belarus	7	2	0	5	8	19	−11	6	Eliminated in group stage
15	Canada	7	2	1	4	16	15	+1	7	Eliminated in group stage
16	Zimbabwe	7	0	0	7	0	55	−55	0	Eliminated in group stage

=== Goalscorers ===
There were 242 goals scored in 62 matches, for an average of 3.9 goals per match.

11 goals

- (Netherlands) Maartje Paumen

8 goals

- (Spain) María Romagosa
- (United States) Lauren Crandall

6 goals

- (China) Zhao Lixin
- (England) Alex Danson
- (Germany) Eileen Hoffmann

5 goals

- (Chile) Beatriz Albertz
- (England) Hayley Brown
- (Germany) Maike Stöckel
- (India) Saba Anjum
- (United States) Katie O'Donnell

4 goals

- (Australia) Amy Korner
- (Germany) Julia Müller
- (India) Sarita Lakra
- (Netherlands) Alessia Padalino
- (South Africa) Liesel Dorothy
- (South Korea) Park Young-Soon

3 goals

- (Argentina) Silvina D'Elía
- (Australia) Kate Hollywood
- (Australia) Shelly Liddelow
- (Canada) Thea Culley
- (Canada) Robyn Pendleton
- (Chile) Daniela Caram
- (England) Crista Cullen
- (England) Julie Hope
- (India) Jasjeet Kaur Handa
- (Netherlands) Vera Vorstenbosch
- (Netherlands) Jolanda Plijter
- (South Korea) Park Mi-Hyun
- (Spain) María Gómez
- (United States) Mia Link

2 goals

- (Argentina) Yanina García
- (Argentina) María Belén Palitto
- (Argentina) Carla Rebecchi
- (Belarus) Sviatlana Bahushevich
- (Belarus) Yulia Piatrova
- (Belarus) Natalia Varabyova
- (Canada) Karen Mann
- (Canada) Tiffany Michaluk
- (Chile) Carolina García
- (China) Li Boyan
- (England) Charlotte Hartley
- (England) Hannah MacLeod
- (Netherlands) Tessa de Haas
- (Scotland) Nikki Kidd
- (South Africa) Cindy Brown
- (South Africa) Illse Davids
- (South Africa) Danielle Forword
- (South Africa) Leslie-Ann George
- (South Africa) Megan Robertson
- (South Korea) Kim Jin-Ju
- (South Korea) Kim Jong-Eun
- (Spain) Soledad Contardí
- (United States) Laree Beans
- (United States) Rachel Dawson
- (United States) Katie Evans
- (United States) Katelyn Falgowski
- (United States) Katie Grant
- (United States) Cara-Lyn Lopresti

1 goal

- (Argentina) Gabriela Aguirre
- (Argentina) Noel Barrionuevo
- (Argentina) Inés Garmendia
- (Argentina) Rosario Luchetti
- (Argentina) Pilar Mejico
- (Australia) Madonna Blyth
- (Australia) Susannah Harris
- (Australia) Rheannin Kelly
- (Australia) Kobie McGurk
- (Belarus) Alena Alshevskaya
- (Belarus) Hanna Basarevskaya
- (Canada) Megan Anderson
- (Canada) Katie Baker
- (Canada) Emma Carbery
- (Canada) Ali Lee
- (Canada) Cailie O'Hara
- (Canada) Katie Rushton
- (Chile) María José Fernández
- (Chile) Denise Infante
- (China) Luan Haiyan
- (China) Wang Ying
- (China) Fu Yu
- (England) Natasha Brennan
- (England) Harriet Cunningham
- (England) Beckie Herbert
- (England) Chloe Rogers
- (Germany) Pia Eidmann
- (Germany) Julia Karwatzky
- (Germany) Franziska Stern
- (India) Deepika Thakur
- (Netherlands) Carlien Dirkse van den Heuvel
- (Netherlands) Mirjam Sijtsma
- (Scotland) Kim Christison
- (Scotland) Aimee Clark
- (Scotland) Holly Cram
- (Scotland) Kim MacGregor
- (Scotland) Laura Wrightson
- (South Korea) Kim Bo-Mi
- (South Korea) Han Hye-Lyoung
- (South Korea) Jeong Jin-Ok
- (South Korea) Im Mi-Ra
- (South Korea) Eum Mi-Young
- (South Korea) Han Tae-Jeong
- (South Korea) Kim Young-Ran
- (Spain) Sumi Aoki
- (Spain) Gloria Comerma
- (Spain) Esther Termens
- (United States) Lauren Ehrlichman
- (United States) Michelle Kasold
- (United States) Jamie Whitten

Source: FIH
