= 2007 Women's Indoor Hockey World Cup =

International indoor hockey tournament

Tournament details
- Host country: Austria
- City: Vienna
- Dates: 14 – 18 February 2007
- Teams: 12 (from 4 confederations)

Final positions
- Champions: Netherlands (1st title)
- Runner-up: Spain
- Third place: Germany

Tournament statistics
- Matches played: 38
- Goals scored: 287 (7.55 per match)
- Top scorer: (Germany) Julia Müller (18 goals)

The 2007 Women's Indoor Hockey World Cup was the second edition of this tournament, played from 14 to 18 February 2007 in Vienna, Austria.

== Results ==
=== Pool A ===
Pos	Team	Pld	W	D	L	GF	GA	GD	Pts	Qualification
1	Germany	5	5	0	0	56	5	+51	15	Semi-finals
2	Ukraine	5	4	0	1	32	24	+8	12	Semi-finals
3	Australia	5	2	1	2	16	26	−10	7	
4	Scotland	5	2	1	2	17	31	−14	7	
5	Italy	5	0	1	4	13	30	−17	1	
6	Czech Republic	5	0	1	4	7	25	−18	1	

Source: FIH
Rules for classification: 1) points; 2) goal difference; 3) goals scored; 4) head-to-head result.

14 February 2007
08:30

Czech Republic	2–7	Ukraine
Borská 3'; Brítová 20'	Report	Vynohradova 4', 5', 22', 26', 37'; Khilko 25'; Vorushylo 36'

Umpires:
Jean Duncan (SCO)
Gina Spitaleri (ITA)

14 February 2007
09:35

Scotland	6–5	Italy
Walker 3', 35'; Semple 7', 32'; Bunce 20+'; Rochlin 21'	Report	Faustini 9'; Quaranta 17', 36'; Canavioso 17'; Torretta 34'

Umpires:
Alicia Takeda (MEX)
Monica Rivera (ESP)

14 February 2007
11:10

Australia	0–12	Germany
	Report	Rodewald 3'; Keller 4', 16', 31'; Plass 10', 12', 40'; Müller 22', 38'; Schütze 22', 25', 37'

Umpires:
Louise Knipe (ENG)
Caroline Brunekreef (NED)

14 February 2007
15:25

Czech Republic	1–4	Australia
Brítová 30'	Report	Rivers 4'; Austin 17', 40'; Tarrant 34'

Umpires:
Elena Eskina (RUS)
Christiane Hippler (GER)

14 February 2007
17:00

Ukraine	10–4	Scotland
Vorushylo 4', 24', 26', 26'; Savenko 8', 14'; Vynohradova 20'; Sadova 30'; Tahiyeva 31'; Khilko 37'	Report	Bryce 9', 39'; Lyon 34'; Bunce 38'

Umpires:
Ludmila Pastorova (SVK)
Caroline Brunekreef (NED)

14 February 2007
18:05

Germany	13–1	Italy
Müller 5', 7', 17', 31', 38'; Rodewald 8', 32'; Plass 18'; Heinlein 21'; Keller 24', 33'; Schütze 40'; Eidmann 40'	Report	Lombardi 34'

Umpires:
Jean Duncan (SCO)
Wendy Stewart (CAN)

15 February 2007
09:35

Scotland	2–2	Australia
Walker 1'; Semple 2'	Report	Tarrant 2'; Young 14'

Umpires:
Louise Knipe (ENG)
Monica Rivera (ESP)

15 February 2007
11:10

Germany	8–2	Czech Republic
Landshut 7'; Müller 13', 23'; Keller 15', 20', 32'; Rodewald 18'; Plass 40'	Report	Preissová 17'; Jiříková 39'

Umpires:
Ludmila Pastorova (SVK)
Wendy Stewart (CAN)

15 February 2007
12:15

Italy	3–5	Ukraine
Torretta 3'; Faustini 28', 35'	Report	Khilko 5', 6'; Vynohradova 8', 36'; Savenko 17'

Umpires:
Alicia Takeda (MEX)
Lisa Roach (AUS)

15 February 2007
17:00

Australia	5–3	Italy
Rivers 12', 37'; Tarrant 22', 33'; Young 30'	Report	Torretta 11'; Lombardi 32'; Faustini 40'

Umpires:
Ludmila Pastorova (SVK)
Alicia Takeda (MEX)

15 February 2007
17:35

Ukraine	2–10	Germany
Vynohradova 10'; Sadova 31'	Report	Keller 12', 19', 40'; Müller 15', 34', 34'; Heinlein 19'; Schütze 24'; Rodewald 28'; Landshut 29'

Umpires:
Lisa Roach (AUS)
Anne McRae (SCO)

15 February 2007
19:45

Scotland	5–1	Czech Republic
Gray 8', 28'; Bunce 15'; Bryce 20'; Semple 24'	Report	Jiříková 21'

Umpires:
Christiane Hippler (GER)
Alicia Takeda (MEX)

16 February 2007
11:40

Ukraine	8–5	Australia
Vynohradova 4', 22', 25', 32'; Vorushylo 8', 25', 40'; Sadova 34'	Report	Simpson 12'; Tarrant 14', 29', 38'; Austin 24'

Umpires:
Jean Duncan (SCO)
Elena Eskina (RUS)

16 February 2007
13:15

Germany	13–0	Scotland
Von Livonius 3', 6'; Müller 8', 8', 22'; Schütze 11'; Landshut 18'; Eidmann 25', 35'; Rodewald 31'; Keller 36', 39'; Plass 40'	Report

Umpires:
Caroline Brunekreef (NED)
Lisa Roach (AUS)

16 February 2007
14:15

Italy	1–1	Czech Republic
Torretta 27'	Report	Matějovská 27'

Umpires:
Ludmila Pastorova (SVK)
Wendy Stewart (CAN)

=== Pool B ===
Pos	Team	Pld	W	D	L	GF	GA	GD	Pts	Qualification
1	Netherlands	5	5	0	0	24	11	+13	15	Semi-finals
2	Spain	5	4	0	1	17	11	+6	12	Semi-finals
3	Belarus	5	3	0	2	19	14	+5	9	
4	Austria	5	2	0	3	16	16	0	6	
5	Canada	5	1	0	4	11	19	−8	3	
6	South Africa	5	0	0	5	8	24	−16	0	

Source: FIH
Rules for classification: 1) points; 2) goal difference; 3) goals scored; 4) head-to-head result.

14 February 2007
11:45

Belarus	6–3	Canada
Tretiakova 5'; Tymul 10'; Piatrova 25', 28', 32'; Shyntar 37'	Report	Rezansoff 23'; Rushton 32'; Dowling 36'

Umpires:
Ludmila Pastorova (SVK)
Lisa Roach (AUS)

14 February 2007
13:20

Netherlands	6–2	Austria
Verhage 4'; Dijkstra 7', 34'; Padalino 9'; Gravesteijn 16'; Van Meer 40'	Report	Zerbs 25'; L. Fail 30'

Umpires:
Wendy Stewart (CAN)
Anne McRae (SCO)

14 February 2007
13:55

South Africa	2–4	Spain
Ci. Botha 10'; Steenkamp 37'	Report	Sánchez 6'; Camón 8', 25'; Panadero 16'

Umpires:
Gina Spitaleri (ITA)
Alicia Takeda (MEX)

14 February 2007
19:45

South Africa	2–4	Netherlands
Ci. Botha 24'; Pholo 36'	Report	Dijkstra 3'; Verhage 14', 26'; Gravesteijn 22'

Umpires:
Louise Knipe (ENG)
Lisa Roach (AUS)

14 February 2007
20:15

Austria	4–2	Canada
Körper 17'; Balek 22'; Specjal 29'; Zerbs 34'	Report	Dowling 6'; Rushton 26'

Umpires:
Elena Eskina (RUS)
Monica Rivera (ESP)

15 February 2007
08:30

Belarus	1–3	Spain
Piatrova 40'	Report	Camón 8', 28'; Gutiérrez 31'

Umpires:
Elena Eskina (RUS)
Anne McRae (SCO)

15 February 2007
12:50

Netherlands	4–2	Canada
Verhage 1'; Voskamp 20'; Padalino 28', 34'	Report	Kedgley 18', 25'

Umpires:
Christiane Hippler (GER)
Gina Spitaleri (ITA)

15 February 2007
13:20

Spain	5–3	Austria
Muñoz 7'; Romagosa 16'; Camón 32', 38'; Sánchez 40'	Report	Körper 15'; Balek 18'; Specjal 27'

Umpires:
Elena Eskina (RUS)
Jean Duncan (SCO)

15 February 2007
13:55

Belarus	7–1	South Africa
Shyntar 2', 12', 25'; Laptsevich 3'; Piatrova 8', 18'; Vasilyeva 35'	Report	Steenkamp 40'

Umpires:
Caroline Brunekreef (NED)
Wendy Stewart (CAN)

15 February 2007
19:10

Austria	5–0	South Africa
Körper 15', 31'; A. Fail 23'; Balek 24'; Specjal 25'	Report

Umpires:
Louise Knipe (ENG)
Gina Spitaleri (ITA)

16 February 2007
09:30

Canada	0–2	Spain
	Report	Camón 30'; Huertas 39'

Umpires:
Ludmila Pastorova (SVK)
Christiane Hippler (GER)

16 February 2007
11:05

Netherlands	5–2	Belarus
Voskamp 3'; Van Meer 3'; Padalino 22', 27', 38'	Report	Vasilyeva 2'; Shyntar 2'

Umpires:
Louise Knipe (ENG)
Monica Rivera (ESP)

16 February 2007
15:50

Spain	3–5	Netherlands
Camón 21'; Panadero 27', 28'	Report	Dijkstra 3', 7', 23'; Plijter 12'; Voskamp 13'

Umpires:
Gina Spitaleri (ITA)
Anne McRae (SCO)

16 February 2007
16:55

Austria	2–3	Belarus
Körper 5'; Zerbs 27'	Report	Piatrova 13'; Shyntar 14'; Laptsevich 40'

Umpires:
Christiane Hippler (GER)
Caroline Brunekreef (NED)

16 February 2007
17:30

Canada	4–3	South Africa
Leslie-Spencer 11', 18', 32'; Rushton 16'	Report	Forword 3', 39'; Ca. Botha 26'

Umpires:
Jean Duncan (SCO)
Alicia Takeda (MEX)

=== Fifth to twelfth place classification ===
==== Eleventh and twelfth place ====
17 February 2007
12:00

Czech Republic	5–1	South Africa
Polcarová 21'; Matějovská 22', 39'; Jiříková 30'; Borská 38'	Report	Ca. Botha 2'

Umpires:
Louise Knipe (ENG)
Wendy Stewart (CAN)

==== Ninth and tenth place ====
17 February 2007
10:00

Italy	2–2	Canada
Faustini 1'; Girotti 25'	Report	Spencer-Leslie 16'; Rushton 24'
Penalties
Faustini (penalty shoot-out scored); Torreta (penalty shoot-out missed); Quaranta (penalty shoot-out scored); Zamboni (penalty shoot-out missed); Lombardi (penalty shoot-out missed)	2–3	(penalty shoot-out missed) Rushton; (penalty shoot-out scored) Dowling; (penalty shoot-out scored) Kedgley; (penalty shoot-out scored) Rezansoff

Umpires:
Elena Eskina (RUS)
Christiane Hippler (GER)

==== Seventh and eighth place ====
17 February 2007
12:40

Scotland	1–3	Austria
Semple 38'	Report	Balek 25'; Körper 37', 39'

Umpires:
Ludmila Pastorova (SVK)
Lisa Roach (AUS)

==== Fifth and sixth place ====
18 February 2007
09:00

Australia	4–5	Belarus
Tarrant 10'; Rivers 28'; Young 38'; Calton 39'	Report	Piatrova 8'; Shyntar 23', 26', 28', 40'

Umpires:
Jean Duncan (SCO)
Christiane Hippler (GER)

=== First to fourth place classification ===
Semi-finals
17 February 2007
Netherlands	8
Ukraine	0
17 February 2007
Germany	3
Spain	4

Final
18 February 2007
Netherlands	4
Spain	2
Third and fourth place
18 February 2007
Ukraine	2
Germany	5

==== Semi-finals ====
17 February 2007
15:20

Netherlands	8–0	Ukraine
Dijkstra 6'; Van Meer 8', 20'; Voskamp 8'; Hoebert 12'; Plijter 13'; Verhage 36'; Padalino 38'	Report

Umpires:
Anne McRae (SCO)
Monica Rivera (ESP)

17 February 2007
18:00

Germany	3–4	Spain
Müller 5'; Rodewald 22'; Plass 24'	Report	Muñoz 6', 18', 38'; Camón 18'

Umpires:
Caroline Brunekreef (NED)
Gina Spitaleri (ITA)

==== Third and fourth place ====
18 February 2007
11:40

Ukraine	2–5	Germany
Vynohradova 1'; Khilko 36'	Report	Müller 28', 38'; Landshut 32'; Von Livonius 33'; Plass 37'

Umpires:
Louise Knipe (ENG)
Monica Rivera (ESP)

==== Final ====
18 February 2007
14:20

Netherlands	4–2	Spain
Verhage 5', 36'; Van Meer 9'; Padalino 28'	Report	Romagosa 34'; Camón 40'

Umpires:
Anne McRae (SCO)
Gina Spitaleri (ITA)

== Statistics ==
=== Final standings ===
Pos	Grp	Team	Pld	W	D	L	GF	GA	GD	Pts	Final result
1st place, gold medalist(s)	B	Netherlands	7	7	0	0	36	13	+23	21	Gold medal
2nd place, silver medalist(s)	B	Spain	7	5	0	2	23	18	+5	15	Silver medal
3rd place, bronze medalist(s)	A	Germany	7	6	0	1	64	11	+53	18	Bronze medal
4	A	Ukraine	7	4	0	3	34	37	−3	12	Fourth place
5	B	Belarus	6	4	0	2	24	18	+6	12	Eliminated in group stage
6	A	Australia	6	2	1	3	20	31	−11	7	Eliminated in group stage
7	B	Austria	6	3	0	3	19	17	+2	9	Eliminated in group stage
8	A	Scotland	6	2	1	3	18	34	−16	7	Eliminated in group stage
9	B	Canada	6	1	1	4	13	21	−8	4	Eliminated in group stage
10	A	Italy	6	0	2	4	15	32	−17	2	Eliminated in group stage
11	A	Czech Republic	6	1	1	4	12	26	−14	4	Eliminated in group stage
12	B	South Africa	6	0	0	6	9	29	−20	0	Eliminated in group stage

Source: FIH

=== Goalscorers ===
There were 287 goals scored in 38 matches, for an average of 7.55 goals per match.

18 goals

- (Germany) Julia Müller

14 goals

- (Ukraine) Maryna Vynohradova

13 goals

- (Germany) Natascha Keller

10 goals

- (Belarus) Volha Shyntar
- (Spain) Núria Camón

8 goals

- (Australia) Gaye Tarrant
- (Belarus) Yulia Piatrova
- (Germany) Jennifer Plass
- (Netherlands) Alessia Padalino
- (Ukraine) Yana Vorushylo

7 goals

- (Austria) Carolin Körper
- (Germany) Marion Rodewald
- (Netherlands) Marieke Dijkstra
- (Netherlands) Claire Verhage

6 goals

- (Germany) Christina Schütze

5 goals

- (Italy) Francesca Faustini
- (Netherlands) Belle van Meer
- (Scotland) Catriona Semple
- (Ukraine) Maryna Khilko

4 goals

- (Australia) Megan Rivers
- (Austria) Irene Balek
- (Canada) Robin Leslie-Spencer
- (Canada) Andrea Rushton
- (Germany) Rebecca Landshut
- (Italy) Claudia Torretta
- (Netherlands) Leonoor Voskamp
- (Spain) Silvia Muñoz

3 goals

- (Australia) Lauren Austin
- (Australia) Fiona Young
- (Austria) Monika Specjal
- (Austria) Corinna Zerbs
- (Czech Republic) Lucie Jiříková
- (Czech Republic) Markéta Matějovská
- (Germany) Pia Eidmann
- (Germany) Britta von Livonius
- (Scotland) Julie Bryce
- (Scotland) Victoria Bunce
- (Scotland) Helen Walker
- (Spain) Yurena Panadero
- (Ukraine) Bohdana Sadova
- (Ukraine) Zhanna Savenko

2 goals

- (Belarus) Yulia Laptsevich
- (Belarus) Alesia Vasilyeva
- (Canada) Laura Dowling
- (Canada) Philippa Kedgley
- (Czech Republic) Karolína Borská
- (Czech Republic) Lenka Brítová
- (Germany) Martina Heinlein
- (Italy) Paola Lombardi
- (Italy) Valentina Quaranta
- (Netherlands) Astrid Gravesteijn
- (Netherlands) Jolanda Plijter
- (Scotland) Kath Gray
- (South Africa) Cara-Lee Botha
- (South Africa) Cindy Botha
- (South Africa) Candice Forword
- (South Africa) Leandri Steenkamp
- (Spain) María Romagosa
- (Spain) Pilar Sánchez

1 goal

- (Australia) Amanda Calton
- (Australia) Melissa Simpson
- (Austria) Annemarie Fail
- (Austria) Lisa Fail
- (Belarus) Alesia Tretiakova
- (Belarus) Iryna Tymul
- (Canada) Kelly Rezansoff
- (Czech Republic) Barbora Polcarová
- (Czech Republic) Denisa Preissová
- (Italy) Matilde Canavioso
- (Italy) Stella Girotti
- (Netherlands) Joelle Hoebert
- (Scotland) Jaime Lyon
- (Scotland) Emma Rochlin
- (South Africa) Tsoanelo Pholo
- (Spain) Rocío Gutiérrez
- (Spain) Raquel Huertas
- (Ukraine) Diana Tahiyeva

Source: FIH

== See also ==
- 2007 Men's Indoor Hockey World Cup
