= 2002 Women's EuroHockey Junior Championship =

Tournament details
- Host country: Spain
- City: Alcalá la Real
- Dates: 4–10 August
- Teams: 8 (from 1 confederation)
- Venue: Club Hockey Alcalá

Final positions
- Champions: Netherlands (5th title)
- Runner-up: England
- Third place: Germany

Tournament statistics
- Matches played: 20
- Goals scored: 74 (3.7 per match)
- Top scorer: (Spain) Miriam Fàbregas (7 goals)

The 2002 Women's EuroHockey Junior Championship was the 11th edition of the Women's EuroHockey Junior Championship, the biennial international women's under-21 field hockey championship of Europe organised by the European Hockey Federation.

The Netherlands won the tournament for the fifth time, defeating England 2–1 in the final. Germany won the bronze medal by defeating Scotland 2–0.

== Teams ==
Including the hosts, eight teams participated in the tournament.

- Belarus
- England
- Germany
- Lithuania
- Netherlands
- Ukraine
- Scotland
- Spain (Host nation)

== Results ==
=== Preliminary round ===
==== Pool A ====
Pos	Team	Pld	W	D	L	GF	GA	GD	Pts	Qualification
1	Netherlands	3	3	0	0	11	2	+9	9	Advanced to Semi-finals
2	Germany	3	2	0	1	9	4	+5	6	Advanced to Semi-finals
3	Spain (H)	3	1	0	2	6	7	−1	3	
4	Lithuania	3	0	0	3	0	13	−13	0	

Source: European Hockey Federation
Rules for classification: 1) points; 2) matches won; 3) goal difference; 4) goals for; 5) head-to-head result; 6) field goals for.
(H) Hosts

4 August 2002
09:00

Germany	1–2	Netherlands
Hartmann 69'	Report	Visser 21'; Van Löben Sels 61'

Umpires:
Mary Power (IRE)
Mónica Rivera (ESP)

4 August 2002
11:00

Spain	3–0	Lithuania
Romagosa 21', 43', 51'	Report

Umpires:
Heather Smith (ENG)
Stella Bartlema (NED)

6 August 2002
18:00

Netherlands	5–0	Lithuania
	Report

6 August 2002
20:00

Spain	2–3	Germany
Prat 52'; 69'	Report	Beermann 8', 46'; Stöckel 33'

7 August 2002
18:00

Germany	5–0	Lithuania
Beermann 7'; Totzke 17'; Achtmann 30'; Kühn 55'; Schütze 64'	Report

7 August 2002
20:00

Netherlands	4–1	Spain
	Report

==== Pool B ====
Pos	Team	Pld	W	D	L	GF	GA	GD	Pts	Qualification
1	England	3	3	0	0	9	1	+8	9	Advanced to Semi-finals
2	Scotland	3	2	0	1	6	4	+2	6	Advanced to Semi-finals
3	Belarus	3	1	0	2	5	9	−4	3	
4	Ukraine	3	0	0	3	0	6	−6	0	

Source: European Hockey Federation
Rules for classification: 1) points; 2) matches won; 3) goal difference; 4) goals for; 5) head-to-head result; 6) field goals for.

4 August 2002
18:00

Scotland	1–0	Ukraine
	Report

4 August 2002
20:00

England	4–1	Belarus
Walsh 39', 53'; O'Donnell 55'; Robertson 67'	Report	Piatrova 29'

Umpires:
Leticia MacKinnon (SCO)
Romas Chmeliauskas (LTU)

5 August 2002
18:00

Ukraine	0–3	England
	Report	Walsh 8'; Robertson 19', 69'

Umpires:
Andrei Saroka (BLR)
Mónica Rivera (ESP)

5 August 2002
20:00

Scotland	5–2	Belarus
	Report

7 August 2002
09:00

Ukraine	0–2	Belarus
	Report

7 August 2002
11:00

England	2–0	Scotland
	Report

=== Classification round ===
Crossover
9 August
Spain	7
Ukraine	0
9 August
Belarus	1
Lithuania	0

Fifth place
10 August
Spain (a.e.t)	4
Belarus	3
Seventh place
10 August
Ukraine	2
Lithuania	0

==== Crossover ====
9 August 2002
08:30

Spain	7–0	Ukraine
	Report

9 August 2002
11:00

Belarus	1–0	Lithuania
Halinouskaya 55'	Report

Attendance: 200

==== Seventh and eighth place ====
10 August 2002
08:30

Ukraine	2–0	Lithuania
	Report

==== Fifth and sixth place ====
10 August 2002
11:00

Spain	4–3 (a.e.t.)	Belarus
Fàbregas 21', 24', 76'; Termens 42'	Report	Shyntar 45'; Halinouskaya 49', 67'

Attendance: 1,500

=== Medal round ===
Semi-finals
9 August
Netherlands	3
Scotland	0
9 August
England	2
Germany	1

Final
10 August
Netherlands	2
England	1
Third place
10 August
Scotland	0
Germany	2

==== Semi-finals ====
9 August 2002
17:30

Netherlands	3–0	Scotland
	Report

9 August 2002
20:00

England	2–1	Germany
Panter 43'; Gilliat-Smith 62'	Report	Beermann 49'

==== Third and fourth place ====
10 August 2002
17:30

Scotland	0–2	Germany
	Report	Kühn 19'; Hoffmann 68'

Attendance: 800

==== Final ====
10 August 2002
20:00

Netherlands	2–1	England
Mulder 7'; Padalino 58'	Report	Gilliat-Smith 30'

== Final standings ==
As per statistical convention in field hockey, matches decided in extra time are counted as wins and losses, while matches decided by penalty shoot-outs are counted as draws.

Pos	Team	Pld	W	D	L	GF	GA	GD	Pts	Status
1st place, gold medalist(s)	Netherlands	5	5	0	0	16	3	+13	15	
2nd place, silver medalist(s)	England	5	4	0	1	12	4	+8	12	
3rd place, bronze medalist(s)	Germany	5	3	0	2	12	6	+6	9	
4	Scotland	5	2	0	3	6	9	−3	6	
5	Spain (H)	5	3	0	2	17	10	+7	9	
6	Belarus	5	2	0	3	9	13	−4	6	
7	Ukraine	5	1	0	4	2	13	−11	3	Relegated to EuroHockey Junior Championship II
8	Lithuania	5	0	0	5	0	16	−16	0	Relegated to EuroHockey Junior Championship II

Source: European Hockey Federation
(H) Hosts

== Goalscorers ==
There were 74 goals scored in 20 matches, for an average of 3.7 goals per match.

7 goals

- (Spain) Miriam Fàbregas

4 goals

- (Germany) Janine Beermann
- (Netherlands) Alessia Padalino
- (Spain) María Romagosa

3 goals

- (Belarus) Maryia Halinouskaya
- (Belarus) Volha Shyntar
- (England) Catherine Gilliat-Smith
- (England) Rachel Walsh
- (Netherlands) Stéphanie van Löben Sels
- (Scotland) Louise Carroll

2 goals

- (Belarus) Yulia Piatrova
- (England) Anne Panter
- (England) Imogen Robertson
- (Germany) Anke Kühn
- (Netherlands) Naomi van As
- (Netherlands) Carolien van Batenburg
- (Netherlands) Maud Mulder
- (Spain) Marta Prat
- (Ukraine) Maryna Vynohradova

1 goal

- (Belarus) Anush Osipava
- (England) Alexandra Danson
- (England) Nicola O'Donnell
- (Germany) Meike Achtmann
- (Germany) Dinah Hartmann
- (Germany) Eileen Hoffmann
- (Germany) Tina Schütze
- (Germany) Maike Stöckel
- (Germany) Janina Totzke
- (Netherlands) Marlieke van de Pas
- (Netherlands) Emmelien Spek
- (Netherlands) Claire Visser
- (Scotland) Elaine Brierley
- (Scotland) Victoria Bunce
- (Scotland) Anne Robertson
- (Spain) Silvia Bonastre
- (Spain) Raquel Huertas
- (Spain) Bárbara Malda
- (Spain) Esther Termens

Source: CEH
