= Padalino =

Padalino is an Italian surname. Notable people with the surname include:

- Alessia Padalino (born 1984), Dutch–born Italian field hockey player
- Marco Padalino (born 1983), Swiss soccer player
- Pasquale Padalino (born 1972), Italian soccer player and manager
