= 2007 Indoor Hockey World Cup =

2007 Indoor Hockey World Cup may refer to:

- 2007 Men's Indoor Hockey World Cup
- 2007 Women's Indoor Hockey World Cup
