= Vera Vorstenbosch =

Australian field hockey player

Personal information
- Born: 10 April 1987 (age 39) Engelen, North Brabant

Sport
- Sport: Field hockey
- Position: Forward
Senior career
Years	Team	Caps	Goals
2002–2017	HC Den Bosch	-	-
National team
Years	Team	Caps	Goals
2005	Netherlands U–21	8	(3)
2006–2010	Netherlands	19	(7)
Medal record
Women's field hockey
Representing Netherlands
FIH Champions Trophy
Silver medal – second place	2010 Nottingham	Team
Bronze medal – third place	2006 Amsterdam	Team
EuroHockey Nations Championship
Gold medal – first place	2009 Amsterdam	Team
FIH Junior World Cup
Bronze medal – third place	2005 Santiago	Team

Vera Vorstenbosch (born 10 April 1987) is a former field hockey player from the Netherlands, who played as a forward.

== Personal life ==
Vera Vorstenbosch was born and raised in Engelen, North Brabant.

== Career ==
=== Club hockey ===
Vorstenbosch was introduced to hockey at age five, playing for Vlijmense.

Throughout her senior career, Vorstenbosch played her club hockey at Den Bosch. She was a member of the women's Hoofdklasse team for fifteen years, ending her career in 2017 with an eleventh league title.

=== International hockey ===
==== Under–21 ====
In 2005, Vorstenbosch was a member of the Netherlands U–21 at the FIH Junior World Cup in Santiago. At the tournament, Vorstenbosch captained the Dutch side to a bronze medal.

==== Oranje Dames ====
Vorstenbosch made her senior international debut for the Netherlands in 2006, at the FIH Champions Trophy in Amsterdam, where she won a bronze medal.

Throughout her career, Vorstenbosch appeared for the Dutch side on thirty occasions, most notably winning a gold medal with the team at the 2009 EuroHockey Championships in Amsterdam.
