= Hash Kanjee =

Canadian field hockey player

Hash Kanjee (born 27 December 1950) is a Canadian former field hockey player.
