= Anne Panter =

English field hockey player

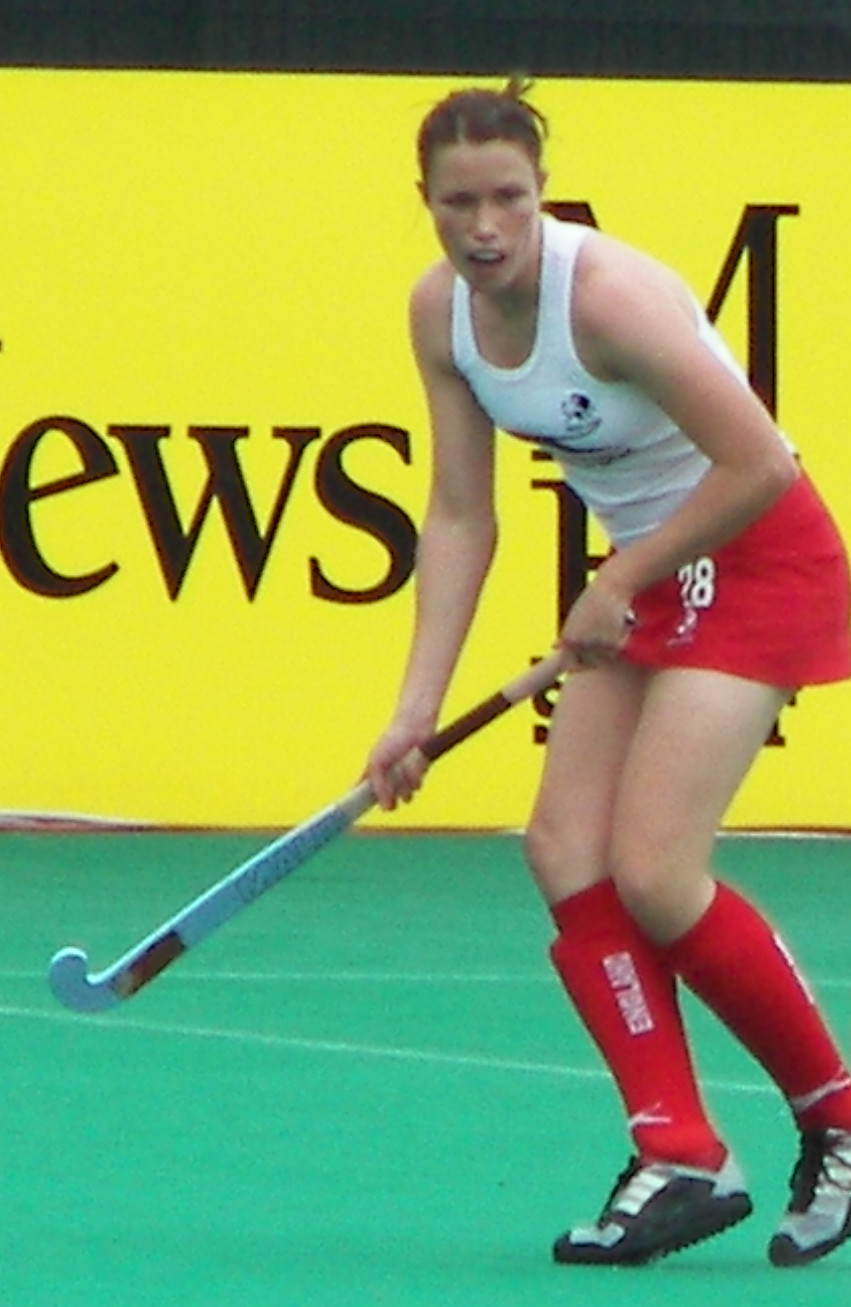
- Panter in 2007

Personal information
- Full name: Michelle Anne Panter
- Born: 28 January 1984 (age 42) Kettering, Northamptonshire, England
- Height: 1.70 m (5 ft 7 in)
- Weight: 62 kg (137 lb)

Sport
- Sport: Field hockey
Medal record
Women's field hockey
Representing Great Britain
Olympic Games
Bronze medal – third place	2012 London	Team
Champions Trophy
Silver medal – second place	2012 Rosario	Team
Representing England
European Championship
Bronze medal – third place	2003 Barcelona	Team
Bronze medal – third place	2007 Manchester	Team
Bronze medal – third place	2011 Gladbach	Team
- Updated on 30 July 2012

Michelle Anne Panter (born 28 January 1984), known as Anne Panter or Ann Panter, is an English field hockey international, who was a member of the England and Great Britain women's field hockey team since 2002. She competed for Great Britain at the 2008 Summer Olympics and was part of the bronze medal-winning team at the 2012 Summer Olympics.

== Personal life ==
Panter studied Mathematics and Economics at the University of Nottingham.
