= Gloria Comerma =

Spanish field hockey player (born 1987)

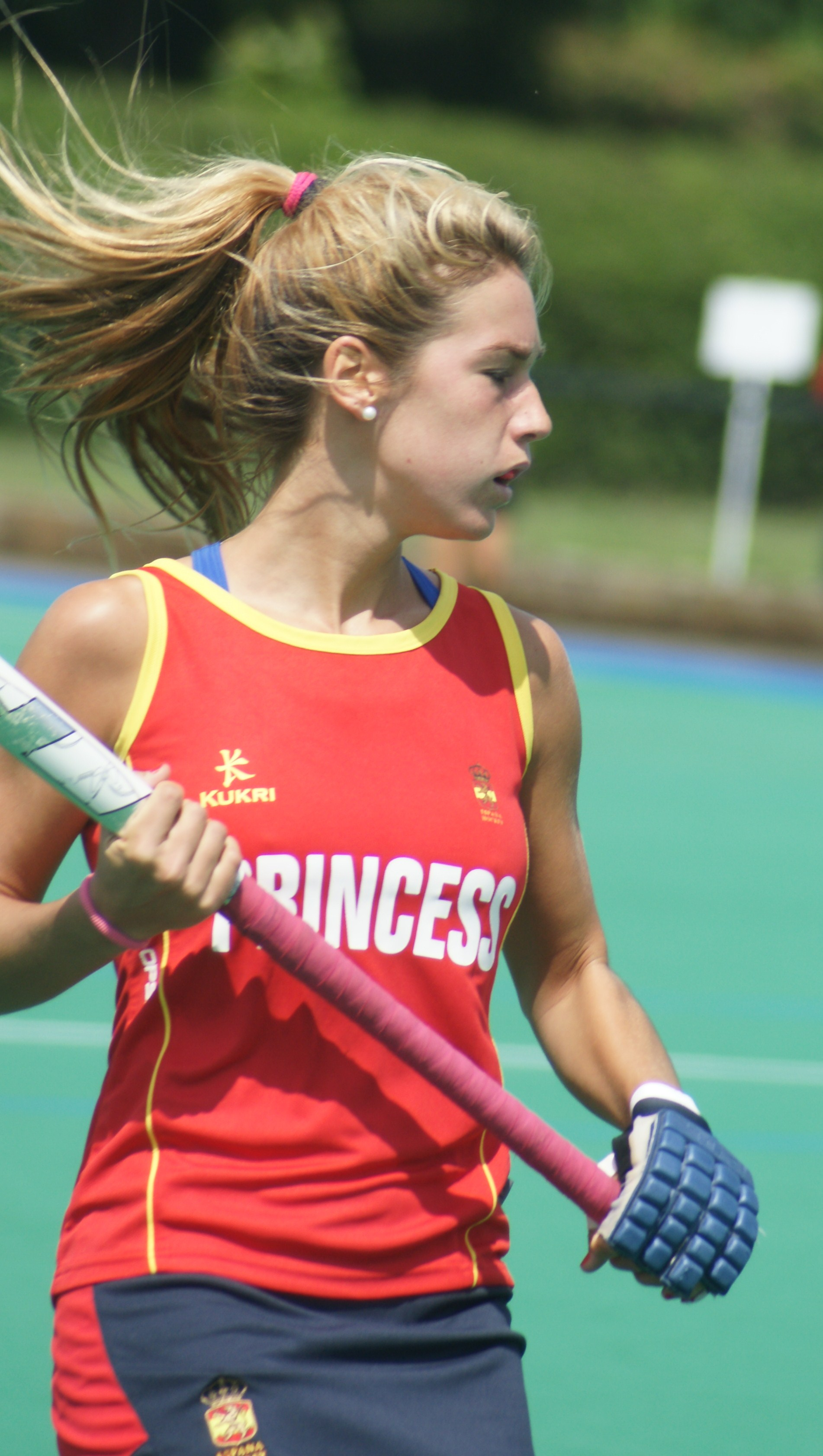
Comerma in 2009

Glòria Comerma Broto (born 18 April 1987) is a Spanish field hockey player from Terrassa who plays as an attacker for Spanish club Egara, for which her sister, Anna Comerma, also plays. She has also played 23 times for Spain women's national field hockey team. Along with her hockey career, she is studying marketing at a university. Some of her hobbies are playing padel and tennis.

== Background ==
- 2003/2004 - Club Egara (JUNIOR)
- 2005/2006 - Club Egara
- 2006/2007 - Club Egara

== Related links ==
- Interview for Ràdio Municipal de Terrassa (30/01/2007)
- Website with more information
