= Katie Baker =

Canadian field hockey player

Katie Baker (born April 21, 1984) was a member of the Canadian Women's National Field Hockey Team from 2006 until 2012 and held the position of captain from 2010 -2012. She has 114 caps to her name.

== Career ==
Baker was introduced to field hockey at age 14 when her family moved to Hamilton, Ontario where she decided to try out for the highschool team. She draws inspiration from her family, and her neighbors at home in Prince Edward Island. She played for the junior national team in 2004 and 2005, the only athlete east of Ontario on the team, before making her debut on the senior national team in 2006. Her first senior international cap was the 2006 UK Tour in Cardiff, Wales. In 2009, she was named to the Pan American Elite team in 2009, and was named PEI Female Athlete of the year.

Katie played professionally overseas for Royal Antwerp Hockey Club in the 2009–2010 season. She retired in 2012, eighth all-time in appearances for Canada. Katie was a two-time winner of the Sport PEI Senior Female Athlete of the Year award and in 2024, she was inducted into the PEI Sports Hall of Fame.

== Personal information ==
Baker was born in Charlottetown, Prince Edward Island on April 21, 1984. Katie attended Bluefield Highschool in Hampshire, Prince Edward Island, Canada. She graduated with a BA in Sociology from Saint Mary's University, and the University of British Columbia and has Graduate Certificate in Executive Coaching from Royal Roads University.

== Competitions ==
- 2010 San Diego Tour
- 2010 Commonwealth Games, Delhi (6th)
- 2010 Chile Series, Vancouver
- 2010 India Series, Vancouver
- 2010 Belgian Champions
- 2010 World Cup Qualifier, San Diego (4th)
- 2010 Chile and Argentina Tour
- 2009 FIH Champions Challenge II, Russia (6th)
- 2009 Pan American Cup, Bermuda (5th)
- 2009 Ireland Tour
- 2008 WorldHockey Olympic Qualifier, Vancouver
- 2008 South Africa Tour
- 2007 Pan American Games, Brazil (5th)
- 2007 South Africa Tour
- 2007 Women's Chile 4 Nations
- 2007 AKPro Chile Series, Vancouver
- 2005 Junior Women's World Cup, Chile
- 2004 Chile Tour
- 2004 UK Tour
- 2006 UK & France Tour
