= Rocío Gutiérrez =

Spanish field hockey player

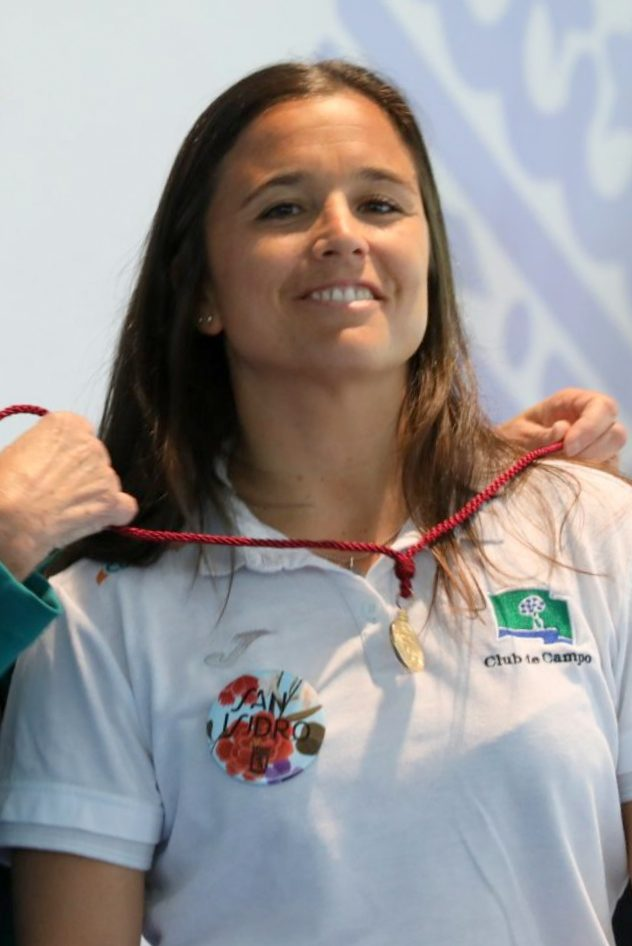

Personal information
- Full name: Rocío Gutiérrez Sierra
- Born: 20 July 1985 (age 41) San Fernando, Cádiz, Spain
- Height: 1.62 m (5 ft 4 in)
- Weight: 61 kg (134 lb)

Sport
- Sport: Field hockey
- Position: Defender
- Club: Club de Campo
Senior career
| Years | Team | Caps | Goals |
| – | Club de Campo | - | - |
National team
| Years | Team | Caps | Goals |
| – | Spain | 141 | - |
Medal record
World Cup
| Bronze medal – third place | 2018 London |

Rocío Gutiérrez Sierra (born 20 July 1985) is a Spanish field hockey player.

She was part of the Spanish national team at the 2016 Summer Olympics in Rio de Janeiro, where they finished eighth and got an Olympic Diploma.

== Early life ==
She was born in a family where hockey was a lifestyle. Her father is called Juan Antonio Gutiérrez and her mother is Dolores Sierra. She has a brother called Martín and a twin sister, Laura. Her sporting career started playing basketball until she was eight and decided to play hockey. The club where she started and the one where she played throughout her teenage years is Club Hockey San Fernando. Rocío still has a close relationship with this club since her father and uncle were co-founders and are current members of its management board.

== Hockey career ==
After her team achieved victory at the Spanish Indoor Hockey Championship in 2001, she was selected for the High Performance Centre (CAR) in Madrid. She was also selected to become part of the under 16, U18 and U21 Spanish teams. During her stay in the High Performance Centre, she was recruited by Club Egara to play for a season. Egara is one of the oldest clubs in Spain and has a plays a huge role in the hockey world. After that, she returned to play with her club in San Fernando for one more season. In 2008, she moved to Club de Campo Villa de Madrid, where she has been playing and captaining the team.

Additionally, Rocio was selected to play for the Spanish National Team which she represented for many years. After a few changes to the team staff and some years of non-participation with the national team, however, since 2013 she has become a permanent member of the team with which she has already played more than 100 official matches. On some occasions Rocio has been captain of the national team and she also received an Olympic Diploma at the 2016 Summer Olympics of Rio.

=== International championships ===
| Tournament | Team | Country | Year |
|---|---|---|---|
| EuroHockey Nations Championship | Spain women's national field hockey team | Netherlands | 2009 Women's EuroHockey Nations Championship |
| Champions Challenge | Spain women's national field hockey team | South Africa | 2009 Champions Challenge |
| Hockey World Cup | Spain women's national field hockey team | Argentina | 2010 Women's Hockey World Cup |
| EuroHockey Nations Championship | Spain women's national field hockey team | Belgium | 2013 Women's EuroHockey Nations Championship |
| Champions Challenge | Spain women's national field hockey team | United Kingdom | 2014 Women's Hockey Champions Challenge |
| EuroHockey Nations Championship | Spain women's national field hockey team | United Kingdom | 2015 Women's EuroHockey Nations Championship |
| Olympic Games | Spain women's national field hockey team | Brazil | Río de Janeiro 2016 |

=== Individual ===
| Award | Year |
|---|---|
| Best player of Spanish's indoor championship | 2013 |
| Best player of the Spanish's League | 2013-2014 |
| Best player of Play Off | 2013-2014 |
| Best player of the final of Final 4 | 2014-2015 |
| Best defender of European Indoor Championship | 2015-2016 |
| Best player of Copa de la Reina | 2015-2016 |
| Best player of Final 4 | 2015-2016 |

== Coaching ==
Rocio has also coached in the lower divisions at her current club, Club de Campo Villa de Madrid.

== Academic career and work experience ==
Rocío Gutiérrez Sierra graduated from Universidad Complutense (Madrid) in Advertising and Public Relations in 2013. She combines hockey with her work. Before the Olympics in Rio she got an internship to work in Page Personnel but she decided to leave it in order to focus on her sport career. After the Olympics, she was hired by the company Bilfinger HSG where she currently working.
