= Kristina Reynolds =

German field hockey player

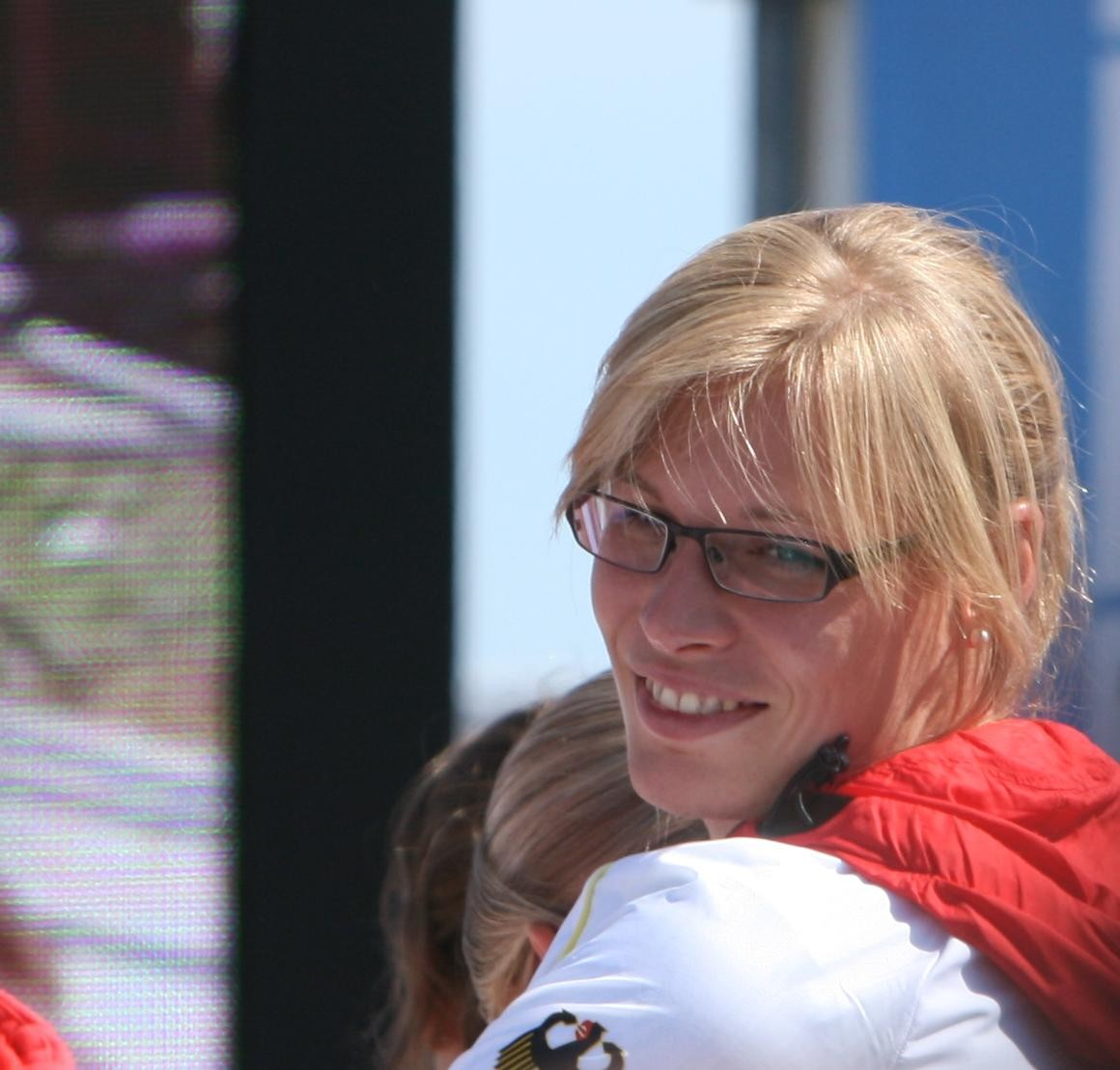

Personal information
- Nationality: German
- Born: 18 February 1984 (age 42) Hamburg, West Germany
- Height: 1.81 m (5 ft 11 in)
- Weight: 71 kg (157 lb)

Sport
- Country: Germany
- Sport: Field hockey
Medal record
Olympic Games
Bronze medal – third place	2016 Rio de Janeiro	Team

Kristina Reynolds (born 18 February 1984) is a German field hockey player who competed in the 2008 Summer Olympics.

She is currently sponsored by Ritual Hockey.
