= Beckie Herbert =

English field hockey player

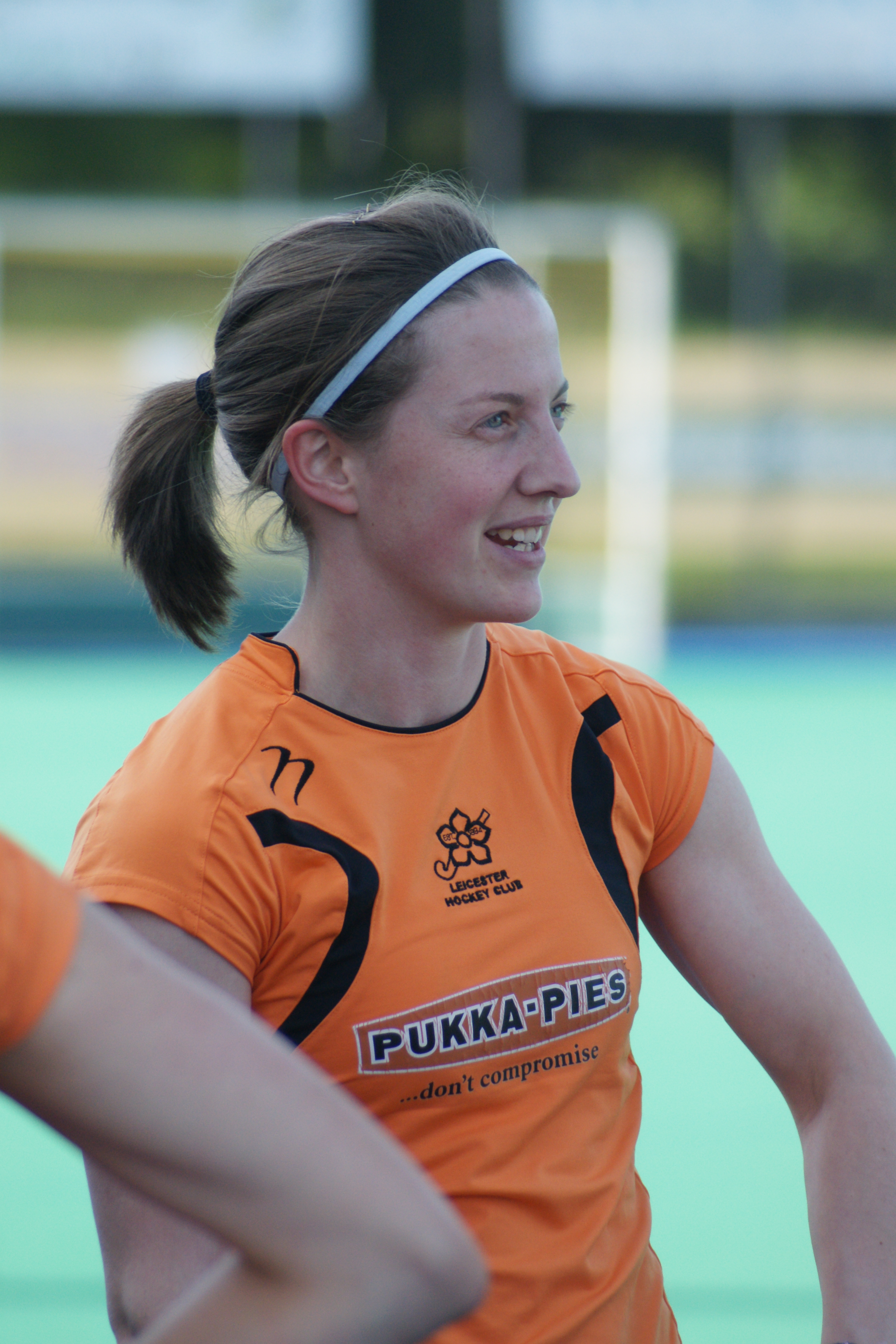

Beckie Herbert (born 23 June 1986) is a field hockey player from Jersey.

== International senior tournaments ==
- 2006 – 2006 Commonwealth Games, Melbourne
- 2011 – Champions Trophy, Amstelveen
