= Eum Mi-young =

South Korean hockey player (born 1984)

Personal information
- Nationality: South Korean
- Born: 22 July 1984 (age 41)

Sport
- Sport: Field hockey
Medal record
Women's field hockey
Representing South Korea
Asia Cup
| Bronze medal – third place | 2009 Bangkok |
Asian Champions Trophy
| Gold medal – first place | 2011 Ordos |

Eum Mi-young (born 22 July 1984) is a South Korean former field hockey player. She competed in the women's tournament at the 2008 Summer Olympics.
