= Alessia Padalino =

Dutch-Italian field hockey player

Personal information
- Full name: Alessia Doriana Padalino
- Born: 26 April 1984 (age 42) The Hague, Netherlands

Sport
- Sport: Field hockey
- Position: Forward
- Club: Klein Zwitserland
National team
Years	Team	Caps	Goals
2002–2005	Netherlands U–21	18	-
2003–2007	Netherlands	14	(1)
2010–2013	Italy	45	(29)
Medal record
Women's field hockey
Representing Netherlands
Junior World Cup
Bronze medal – third place	2005 Santiago	Team
EuroHockey Junior Championship
Gold medal – first place	2002 Alcalá la Real	Team
Gold medal – first place	2004 Dublin	Team
Indoor World Cup
Gold medal – first place	2007 Vienna	Team
Representing Italy
Champions Challenge II
Silver medal – second place	2011 Vienna	Team

Alessia Doriana Padalino (born 26 April 1984) is a Dutch–Italian former field hockey player.

== Personal life ==
Alessia Padalino was born in The Hague, Netherlands to a Dutch mother and Italian father. She has an identical twin sister, Chiara, who also plays hockey and was her teammate for Italy.

== Career ==
=== Netherlands ===
==== Under–21 ====
Padalino first represented the Netherlands Under–21 team in 2002, at the EuroHockey Junior Championship held in Alcalá la Real, Spain. She went on to represent the team again in 2004 at the next EuroHockey Junior tournament in Dublin, Ireland, winning gold medals at both events.

In 2005, Padalino won a bronze medal at the Junior World Cup, her last performance for the Dutch junior side.

==== Senior National Team ====
Following her success in the juniors, Padalino debuted for the senior national team in 2003. She never represented the side at a major tournament, rather a series of test matches in her four-year career with the team. During this time she achieved 14 caps and 1 goal.

==== Indoor ====
As well as field hockey, Padalino also represented the Netherlands in indoor hockey, most notably winning gold at the 2007 Indoor World Cup in Vienna, Austria.

=== Country Change ===
After representing the Netherlands for 5 years in junior and senior competition, Padalino made the switch to the Italian team in 2010. After not receiving a call-up to the Netherlands senior team for almost four year, Padalino received a call from Italian coaching staff asking her to represent the national team. She made her first appearance for Italy, her father's home country, in November 2010 in a test match against Argentina.

=== Italy ===
==== Senior National Team ====
Following her debut for Italy in 2010, Padalino maintained selection in the team until 2013, when she retired from international competition.

Padalino's most notable performance with the team was at the 2011 Champions Challenge II in Vienna where she won a silver medal, losing 2–1 to Belgium in the final. During the competition she scored 4 goals, including their only goal in the final.

Her final appearance for Italy was during the Hockey World League, at a Round 2 event in Valencia, Spain.
