= Illse Davids =

South African field hockey player

Personal information
- Born: 26 March 1987 (age 39) Cape Town, South Africa
- Height: 163 cm (5 ft 4 in)
- Weight: 55 kg (121 lb)

Sport
- Sport: Field hockey
- Position: Midfielder
National team
Years	Team	Caps	Goals
2005	South Africa	7	(2)
2012-2018	South Africa	176	(11)
Coaching career
- Years: Team
- 2022-: Maties (assistant coach)
Medal record
Women's field hockey
Representing South Africa
African Cup of Nations
Gold medal – first place	2013 Nairobi
Gold medal – first place	2017 Ismailia

Illse Davids (born 26 March 1987 in Cape Town, South Africa) is a South African field hockey player. At the 2012 Summer Olympics she competed with the South Africa women's national field hockey team in the women's tournament. She studied at the University of North Carolina and played for their hockey team. She obtained their Postgraduate Certificate in Education (PGCE), Stellenbosch University.
