= Cindy Brown (field hockey) =

South African field hockey player

Personal information
- Born: 31 May 1985 (age 41) Port Elizabeth, South Africa

Sport
- Sport: Field hockey
National team
Years	Team	Caps	Goals
2005	South Africa U21	8	(2)
-2010	South Africa	93	-
Coaching career
- Years: Team
- 2024–: South Africa U21

Cindy Brown (born 31 May 1985) is a South African field hockey player who competed in the 2008 Summer Olympics.

At the coach South Africa women Junior World Cup.
