= Pia Eidmann =

German field hockey player

Pia Eidmann (born 26 August 1984) is a German field hockey player who competed in the 2008 Summer Olympics.
