= Jennifer Plass =

German field hockey player (born 1985)

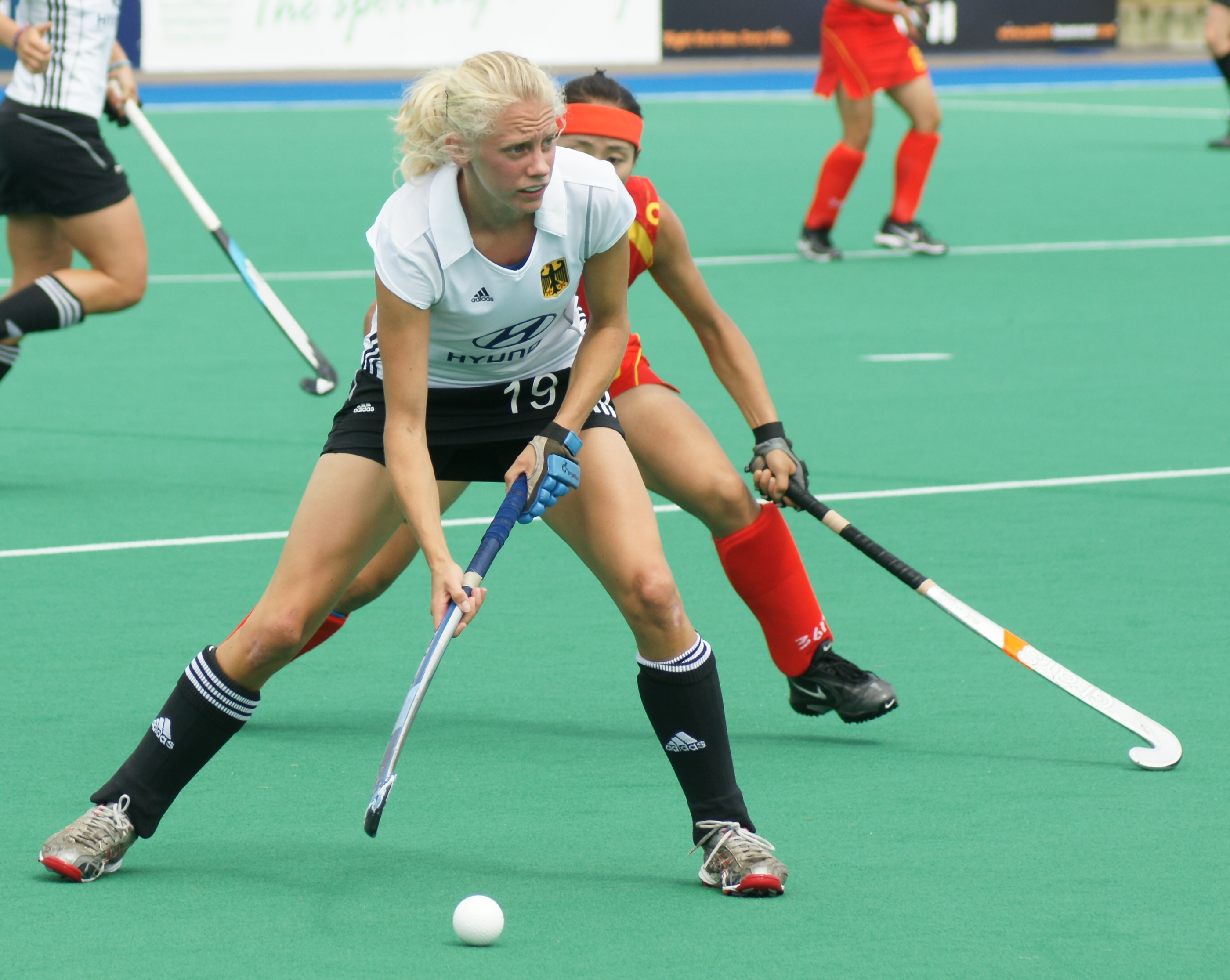

Jennifer Plass (born 10 July 1985 in Hanover) is a German field hockey player. At the 2012 Summer Olympics, she competed for the Germany women's national field hockey team in the women's event.
