= María Romagosa =

Spanish field hockey player (born 1985)

María Romagosa (born 7 September 1985) is a Spanish field hockey player who competed for her country in the 2002 and 2006 women's hockey World Cups and the 2008 Summer Olympics.
