= Field hockey at the 2024 Summer Olympics – Women's qualification =

The women's qualification for the Olympic field hockey tournament occurred between August 2023 and January 2024, allocating twelve teams for the final tournament. All five FIH (International Hockey Federation) zones secured a continental representation in the Olympic field hockey event.

The host nation France received a direct quota place in the women's tournament after having attained the top twenty-five spot or higher in the FIH world ranking list. The remaining half of the field attributed the quota places to the top three teams in each of the two separate FIH Olympic qualifying tournaments.

== Method ==
Twelve teams were to participate in the women's field hockey tournament, with each National Olympic Committee (NOC) sending a roster of sixteen players and two substitutes.

=== Host nation ===
As the host nation, France received a direct quota place in the women's tournament after having attained the top twenty-five spot or higher in the FIH world ranking list. If the French hockey players had won the 2023 EuroHockey Championships, the number of places in two wildcard tournaments would have risen to seven, with the remaining spot offered to the highest-ranked of the two bronze medal losers.

=== Continental qualification ===
The winners from each of the five confederation zones (Africa, Americas, Asia, Europe, and Oceania) in their respective tournaments listed below secured a quota place for their respective NOC:

- Africa – 2023 African Games later replaced by the 2023 African Olympic Qualifier
- Americas – 2023 Pan American Games
- Asia – 2022 Asian Games
- Europe – 2023 EuroHockey Championship
- Oceania – 2023 Oceania Cup

=== Qualification via the wild card tournament ===
The remaining half of the total quota were attributed to the eight-team field through each of the two separate FIH Olympic Qualifying Tournaments (OQTs), that took place from 13 to 20 January 2024. The top three eligible NOCs at the end of each tournament secured the berths to complete the twelve-team field for Paris 2024.

The teams based on the continental quotas, determined by the number of NOCs from each continent within the top 22 of the FIH world ranking list, were eligible to participate in each of the two OQTs. From these quotas, six nations (the host nation France and five continental winners) qualified for Paris were removed from the list, leaving the remainder to be filled by the highest-ranked eligible NOCs in each of the continental meets.

=== Qualified teams ===
Qualification	Date	Host/Country	Berths	Qualified team
Host country	—		1	France
2023 Oceania Cup	10–13 August 2023	Whangārei	1	Australia
2023 EuroHockey Championship	18–26 August 2023	Mönchengladbach	1	Netherlands
2022 Asian Games	25 September − 7 October 2023	Hangzhou	1	China
2023 Pan American Games	26 October – 4 November 2023	Santiago	1	Argentina
2023 African Olympic Qualifier	29 October – 5 November 2023	Pretoria	1	South Africa
2024 FIH Hockey Olympic Qualifiers	13–20 January 2024	Ranchi	3	Germany; United States; Japan
2024 FIH Hockey Olympic Qualifiers	13–20 January 2024	Valencia	3	Belgium; Spain; Great Britain
Total			12	

== 2023 Oceania Cup ==
Pos	Team	Pld	W	D	L	GF	GA	GD	Pts	Qualification
1	Australia	3	2	1	0	7	3	+4	7	2024 Summer Olympics
2	New Zealand (H)	3	0	1	2	3	7	−4	1	2024 FIH Hockey Olympic Qualifiers

Source: FIH
Rules for classification: 1) points; 2) matches won; 3) goal difference; 4) goals for; 5) head-to-head result; 6) field goals for.
(H) Hosts

== 2023 EuroHockey Championships ==
=== Qualified teams ===
Along with the host nation Germany, the top three teams at the 2021 EuroHockey Championship and the four winners of the 2022 EuroHockey Championship Qualifiers fielded the women's tournament.

Qualification	Date	Host	Berths	Qualified team
Host nation	14 December 2020	—	1	Germany
2021 EuroHockey Championship	5–13 June 2021	(Netherlands) Amstelveen	3	Netherlands; Belgium; Spain
EuroHockey Championship Qualifiers	17–20 August 2022	(Lithuania) Vilnius	1	Italy
EuroHockey Championship Qualifiers	18–21 August 2022	(Republic of Ireland) Dublin	1	Ireland
EuroHockey Championship Qualifiers	24–27 August 2022	(France) Dunkirk	1	Scotland
EuroHockey Championship Qualifiers	25–28 August 2022	(England) Durham	1	England
Total			8	

=== Preliminary round ===
==== Pool A ====
Pos	Team	Pld	W	D	L	GF	GA	GD	Pts	Qualification
1	Netherlands	3	3	0	0	12	1	+11	9	Semi-finals
2	Belgium	3	2	0	1	11	2	+9	6	Semi-finals
3	Spain	3	1	0	2	3	10	−7	3	
4	Italy	3	0	0	3	0	13	−13	0	

Source: FIH
Rules for classification: 1) points; 2) matches won; 3) goal difference; 4) goals for; 5) head-to-head result; 6) field goals for.

==== Pool B ====
Pos	Team	Pld	W	D	L	GF	GA	GD	Pts	Qualification
1	Germany (H)	3	3	0	0	14	0	+14	9	Semi-finals
2	England	3	2	0	1	8	5	+3	6	Semi-finals
3	Ireland	3	1	0	2	5	8	−3	3	
4	Scotland	3	0	0	3	0	14	−14	0	

Source: FIH
Rules for classification: 1) points; 2) matches won; 3) goal difference; 4) goals for; 5) head-to-head result; 6) field goals for.
(H) Hosts

=== Final round ===
Semi-finals
24 August
Netherlands	7
England	0
24 August
Germany	0
Belgium	1

Final
26 August
Netherlands	3
Belgium	1
Third place
26 August
England	0
Germany	3

=== Final ranking ===
Pos	Team	Qualification
1st place, gold medalist(s)	Netherlands	2024 Summer Olympics
2nd place, silver medalist(s)	Belgium	2024 FIH Hockey Olympic Qualifiers
3rd place, bronze medalist(s)	Germany (H)	2024 FIH Hockey Olympic Qualifiers
4	England (Note: England qualified the Great Britain team for the Olympic Qualifiers)	2024 FIH Hockey Olympic Qualifiers
5	Ireland	2024 FIH Hockey Olympic Qualifiers
6	Spain	2024 FIH Hockey Olympic Qualifiers
7	Scotland (Note: As England already qualified Great Britain for the Olympic Qualifiers, Scotland berth was passed to the next ranked team.)	
8	Italy	2024 FIH Hockey Olympic Qualifiers

Source: FIH
(H) Host

== 2022 Asian Games ==
=== Qualified teams ===
Qualification	Date	Host	Berths	Qualified team
Host country	16 September 2016	—	1	China
2018 Asian Games	19–31 August 2018	(Indonesia) Jakarta	5	Japan; India; South Korea; Malaysia; Thailand
2022 Asian Games Qualifier	6–14 June 2022	(Indonesia) Jakarta	4	Hong Kong; Kazakhstan; Singapore; Indonesia
Total			10	

=== Preliminary round ===
==== Pool A ====
Pos	Team	Pld	W	D	L	GF	GA	GD	Pts	Qualification
1	India	4	3	1	0	33	1	+32	10	Semi-finals
2	South Korea	4	3	1	0	17	1	+16	10	Semi-finals
3	Malaysia	4	2	0	2	16	12	+4	6	Fifth place game
4	Singapore	4	1	0	3	2	25	−23	3	Seventh place game
5	Hong Kong	4	0	0	4	0	29	−29	0	Ninth place game

Source: FIH
Rules for classification: 1) points; 2) matches won; 3) goal difference; 4) goals for; 5) head-to-head result; 6) field goals for.

==== Pool B ====
Pos	Team	Pld	W	D	L	GF	GA	GD	Pts	Qualification
1	Japan	4	4	0	0	31	0	+31	12	Semi-finals
2	China (H)	4	3	0	1	43	2	+41	9	Semi-finals
3	Thailand	4	2	0	2	7	26	−19	6	Fifth place game
4	Kazakhstan	4	1	0	3	2	24	−22	3	Seventh place game
5	Indonesia	4	0	0	4	1	32	−31	0	Ninth place game

Source: FIH
Rules for classification: 1) points; 2) matches won; 3) goal difference; 4) goals for; 5) head-to-head result; 6) field goals for.
(H) Hosts

=== Medal round ===
Semi-finals
5 October
India	0
China	4
5 October
Japan	2 (3)
South Korea	2 (4)

Final
7 October
China	2
South Korea	0
Third place
7 October
India	2
Japan	1

=== Final standings ===
Pos	Team	Qualification
1st place, gold medalist(s)	China (H)	2024 Summer Olympics
2nd place, silver medalist(s)	South Korea	2024 FIH Hockey Olympic Qualifiers
3rd place, bronze medalist(s)	India	2024 FIH Hockey Olympic Qualifiers
4	Japan	2024 FIH Hockey Olympic Qualifiers
5	Malaysia	2024 FIH Hockey Olympic Qualifiers
6	Thailand	
7	Singapore	
8	Kazakhstan	
9	Hong Kong	
10	Indonesia	

Source: FIH
(H) Host

== 2023 Pan American Games ==
=== Qualified teams ===
Qualification	Date	Host	Quota(s)	Qualified team
Host country	—		~~1~~	—
2022 Pan American Cup	19–29 January	(Chile) Santiago	~~2~~ 4	Canada; United States; Uruguay; Trinidad and Tobago
2022 South American Games	4–12 October	(Paraguay) Asunción	2	Chile; Argentina
2023 Central American and Caribbean Games	27 June – 5 July	(Dominican Republic) Santo Domingo	2	Mexico; Cuba
Total			8	

- Chile finished in the top two at the 2022 South American Games, meaning the host nation quota was reallocated as an additional quota through the 2022 Pan American Cup.
- Since Canada and the USA qualified through the Pan American Cup, an additional spot was available through the event.

=== Preliminary round ===
==== Pool A ====
Pos	Team	Pld	W	D	L	GF	GA	GD	Pts	Qualification
1	Argentina	3	3	0	0	34	1	+33	9	Semi-finals
2	United States	3	2	0	1	19	5	+14	6	Semi-finals
3	Uruguay	3	1	0	2	11	11	0	3	5th–8th classification
4	Trinidad and Tobago	3	0	0	3	0	47	−47	0	5th–8th classification

Source: FIH
Rules for classification: 1) points; 2) matches won; 3) goal difference; 4) goals for; 5) head-to-head result; 6) field goals for.

==== Pool B ====
Pos	Team	Pld	W	D	L	GF	GA	GD	Pts	Qualification
1	Chile (H)	3	3	0	0	14	0	+14	9	Semi-finals
2	Canada	3	2	0	1	12	3	+9	6	Semi-finals
3	Cuba	3	0	1	2	2	10	−8	1	5th–8th classification
4	Mexico	3	0	1	2	1	16	−15	1	5th–8th classification

Source: FIH
Rules for classification: 1) points; 2) matches won; 3) goal difference; 4) goals for; 5) head-to-head result; 6) field goals for.
(H) Hosts

=== Medal round ===
Semi-finals
2 November
Argentina	3
Canada	0
2 November
Chile	1 (1)
United States	1 (3)

Gold medal match
4 November
Argentina	2
United States	1
Bronze medal match
4 November
Canada	0
Chile	2

=== Final standings ===
Pos	Team	Qualification
1st place, gold medalist(s)	Argentina	2024 Summer Olympics
2nd place, silver medalist(s)	United States	2024 FIH Hockey Olympic Qualifiers
3rd place, bronze medalist(s)	Chile (H)	2024 FIH Hockey Olympic Qualifiers
4	Canada	2024 FIH Hockey Olympic Qualifiers
5	Uruguay	
6	Cuba	
7	Trinidad and Tobago	
8	Mexico	

Source: FIH
(H) Host

== 2023 African Olympic Qualifier ==
=== Qualified teams ===
Qualification	Date	Host	Berths	Qualified team
FIH World Rankings	—	—	2	South Africa; Ghana
Northeast African Qualifying Tournament	6 June 2022	Cancelled	2	Kenya; ~~Uganda~~
Northwest African Qualifying Tournament	25 August 2022	Cancelled	2	Nigeria; Zambia^{*}
FIH Central and South Africa Qualifying Tournament	31 August – 4 September 2022	(Zimbabwe) Harare	2	Zimbabwe; Namibia
Total			8	

=== Preliminary round ===
==== Pool A ====
Pos	Team	Pld	W	D	L	GF	GA	GD	Pts	Qualification
1	South Africa (H)	2	2	0	0	14	0	+14	6	Semi-finals
2	Nigeria	2	1	0	1	2	5	−3	3	Semi-finals
3	Zimbabwe	2	0	0	2	1	12	−11	0	Fifth to seventh place classification

Source: FIH
Rules for classification: 1) points; 2) matches won; 3) goal difference; 4) goals for; 5) head-to-head result; 6) field goals for.
(H) Hosts

==== Pool B ====
Pos	Team	Pld	W	D	L	GF	GA	GD	Pts	Qualification
1	Kenya	3	3	0	0	8	2	+6	9	Semi-finals
2	Ghana	3	2	0	1	11	5	+6	6	Semi-finals
3	Zambia	3	1	0	2	4	13	−9	3	Fifth to seventh place classification
4	Namibia	3	0	0	3	3	6	−3	0	Fifth to seventh place classification

Source: FIH
Rules for classification: 1) points; 2) matches won; 3) goal difference; 4) goals for; 5) head-to-head result; 6) field goals for.

=== Medal round ===
Semi-finals
3 November
South Africa	7
Ghana	0
3 November
Kenya	0
Nigeria	1

Final
5 November
South Africa	9
Nigeria	0
Third place
5 November
Ghana	1
Kenya	3

=== Final standings ===
Pos	Team	Qualification
1	South Africa (H)	2024 Summer Olympics
2	Nigeria	
3	Kenya	
4	Ghana	
5	Namibia	
6	Zambia	
7	Zimbabwe	

Source: FIH
(H) Host

== FIH Hockey Olympic Qualifiers ==
=== Qualified teams ===
Qualification	Date	Host	Berths	Qualified team
2023 EuroHockey Championship II	30 July – 5 August 2023	(Czech Republic) Prague	2	Czech Republic; Ukraine
2023 Oceania Cup	10–13 August 2023	(New Zealand) Whangārei	1	New Zealand
2023 EuroHockey Championship	18–26 August 2023	(Germany) Mönchengladbach	6	Belgium; Germany; Great Britain; Ireland; Spain; Italy
2022 Asian Games	25 September − 7 October 2023	(China) Hangzhou	4	South Korea; India; Japan; Malaysia
2023 Pan American Games	26 October – 4 November 2023	(Chile) Santiago	3	United States; Chile; Canada
Total			16	

=== Final standings ===
Pos	Team	Qualification
1	Germany	2024 Summer Olympics
2	United States	2024 Summer Olympics
3	Japan	2024 Summer Olympics
4	India (H)	
5	New Zealand	
6	Italy	
7	Chile	
8	Czech Republic	

Source: FIH
(H) Host

Pos	Team	Qualification
1	Belgium	2024 Summer Olympics
2	Spain (H)	2024 Summer Olympics
3	Great Britain	2024 Summer Olympics
4	Ireland	
5	South Korea	
6	Canada	
7	Ukraine	
8	Malaysia	

Source: FIH
(H) Host

== See also ==
- Field hockey at the 2024 Summer Olympics – Men's qualification
