= Field hockey at the 2024 Summer Olympics – Men's qualification =

The men's qualification for the Olympic field hockey tournament occurred between August 2023 and January 2024, allocating twelve teams for the final tournament. All five FIH (International Hockey Federation) zones were expected to have a continental representation in the Olympic field hockey event.

The host nation France received a direct quota place in the men's tournament after having attained the top twenty-five spot or higher in the FIH world ranking list. The remaining half of the field will attribute the quota places to the top three teams in each of the two separate FIH Olympic qualifying tournaments.

== Method ==
Twelve teams will participate in the men's field hockey tournament, with each National Olympic Committee (NOC) sending a roster of sixteen players and two substitutes.

=== Host nation ===
As the host nation, France received a direct quota place in the men's tournament after having attained the top twenty-five spot or higher in the FIH world ranking list. If the French hockey players had won the 2023 EuroHockey Championships, the number of places in two wildcard tournaments would have risen to seven, with the remaining spot offered to the highest-ranked of the two bronze medal losers.

=== Continental qualification ===
The winners from each of the five confederation zones (Africa, Americas, Asia, Europe, and Oceania) in their respective tournaments listed below secured a quota place for their respective NOC:

- Africa – 2023 African Games later replaced by the 2023 African Olympic Qualifier
- Americas – 2023 Pan American Games
- Asia – 2022 Asian Games
- Europe – 2023 EuroHockey Championship
- Oceania – 2023 Oceania Cup

=== Qualification via the wild card tournament ===
The remaining half of the total quota was attributed to the eight-team field through each of the two separate FIH Olympic Qualifying Tournaments (OQTs), held in January 2024. The top three eligible NOCs at the end of each tournament secured the berths to complete the twelve-team field for Paris 2024. If the host nation France had won the 2023 EuroHockey Championships, a seventh spot would have been available in the OQTs to be eventually awarded to the highest-ranked of the two bronze medal losers at midnight on the final day of the second tournament.

The teams based on the continental quotas, determined by the number of NOCs from each continent within the top 22 of the FIH world ranking list, were eligible to participate in each of the two OQTs. From these quotas, six nations (the host nation France and five continental winners) qualified for Paris were removed from the list, leaving the remainder to be filled by the highest-ranked eligible NOCs in each of the continental meets.

On 28 September 2023, the FIH announced that Oman would host a qualification tournament instead of Pakistan, due to recent developments in the governance situation of the Pakistan Hockey Federation.

=== Qualified teams ===
Qualification	Date	Host/Country	Berths	Qualified team
Host country	—N/a		1	France
2023 Oceania Cup	10–13 August 2023	Whangarei	1	Australia
2023 EuroHockey Championship	19–27 August 2023	Mönchengladbach	1	Netherlands
2022 Asian Games	24 September − 6 October 2023	Hangzhou	1	India
2023 Pan American Games	25 October – 3 November 2023	Santiago	1	Argentina
2023 African Olympic Qualifier	29 October – 5 November 2023	Pretoria	1	South Africa
2024 FIH Hockey Olympic Qualifiers	13–21 January 2024	Valencia	3	Belgium; Spain; Ireland
2024 FIH Hockey Olympic Qualifiers	13–21 January 2024	Muscat	3	Germany; Great Britain; New Zealand
Total			12	

== 2023 Oceania Cup ==
Pos	Team	Pld	W	D	L	GF	GA	GD	Pts	Qualification
1	Australia	3	2	0	1	8	6	+2	6	2024 Summer Olympics
2	New Zealand (H)	3	1	0	2	6	8	−2	3	2024 FIH Hockey Olympic Qualifiers

Source: FIH
Rules for classification: 1) points; 2) matches won; 3) goal difference; 4) goals for; 5) head-to-head result; 6) field goals for.
(H) Hosts

== 2023 EuroHockey Championships ==
=== Qualified teams ===
Along with the host nation Germany, the top three teams at the 2021 EuroHockey Championship and the four winners of the 2022 EuroHockey Championship Qualifiers fielded the men's tournament.

Qualification	Date	Host	Berths	Qualified team
Host nation	14 December 2020	—N/a	1	Germany
2021 EuroHockey Championship	4–12 June 2021	(Netherlands) Amstelveen	3	Netherlands; Belgium; England
EuroHockey Championship Qualifiers	17–20 August 2022	(Spain) Ourense	1	Spain
EuroHockey Championship Qualifiers	23–26 August 2022	(Austria) Vienna	1	Austria
EuroHockey Championship Qualifiers	24–27 August 2022	(France) Calais	1	France
EuroHockey Championship Qualifiers	24–27 August 2022	(Scotland) Glasgow	1	Wales
Total			8	

=== Preliminary round ===
==== Pool A ====
Pos	Team	Pld	W	D	L	GF	GA	GD	Pts	Qualification
1	Belgium	3	3	0	0	13	5	+8	9	Semi-finals
2	England	3	2	0	1	10	8	+2	6	Semi-finals
3	Spain	3	1	0	2	9	9	0	3	
4	Austria	3	0	0	3	1	11	−10	0	

Source: FIH
Rules for classification: 1) points; 2) matches won; 3) goal difference; 4) goals for; 5) head-to-head result; 6) field goals for.

==== Pool B ====
Pos	Team	Pld	W	D	L	GF	GA	GD	Pts	Qualification
1	Germany (H)	3	2	1	0	10	4	+6	7	Semi-finals
2	Netherlands	3	2	0	1	14	4	+10	6	Semi-finals
3	France	3	1	0	2	3	10	−7	3	
4	Wales	3	0	1	2	4	13	−9	1	

Source: FIH
Rules for classification: 1) points; 2) matches won; 3) goal difference; 4) goals for; 5) head-to-head result; 6) field goals for.
(H) Hosts

=== Final round ===
Semi-finals
25 August
Belgium	2
Netherlands	3
25 August
Germany	0 (4)
England (p.s.o.)	0 (5)

Final
27 August
Netherlands	2
England	1
Third place
27 August
Belgium	2
Germany	0

=== Final ranking ===
Pos	Team	Qualification
1st place, gold medalist(s)	Netherlands	2024 Summer Olympics
2nd place, silver medalist(s)	England	2024 FIH Hockey Olympic Qualifiers
3rd place, bronze medalist(s)	Belgium	2024 FIH Hockey Olympic Qualifiers
4	Germany (H)	2024 FIH Hockey Olympic Qualifiers
5	France (Note: France is already qualified for the Olympics as the host nation.)	
6	Spain	2024 FIH Hockey Olympic Qualifiers
7	Austria	2024 FIH Hockey Olympic Qualifiers
8	Wales (Note: Wales is not eligible for the Olympics.)	

Source: FIH
(H) Host

== 2022 Asian Games ==
=== Qualified teams ===
Qualification	Date	Host	Berths	Qualified team
Host country	16 September 2016	—N/a	1	China
2018 Asian Games	20 August – 1 September 2018	(Indonesia) Jakarta	5	Japan; Malaysia; India; Pakistan; South Korea
2022 Asian Games Qualifier	6–15 May 2022	(Thailand) Bangkok	6	Oman; Bangladesh; Indonesia; Thailand; ~~Sri Lanka~~; Uzbekistan; Singapore
Total			12	

=== Preliminary round ===
==== Pool A ====
Pos	Team	Pld	W	D	L	GF	GA	GD	Pts	Qualification
1	India	5	5	0	0	58	5	+53	15	Semi-finals
2	Japan	5	4	0	1	36	9	+27	12	Semi-finals
3	Pakistan	5	3	0	2	38	17	+21	9	Fifth place game
4	Bangladesh	5	2	0	3	15	29	−14	6	Seventh place game
5	Uzbekistan	5	1	0	4	7	49	−42	3	Ninth place game
6	Singapore	5	0	0	5	5	50	−45	0	Eleventh place game

Source: FIH
Rules for classification: 1) points; 2) matches won; 3) goal difference; 4) goals for; 5) head-to-head result; 6) field goals for.

==== Pool B ====
Pos	Team	Pld	W	D	L	GF	GA	GD	Pts	Qualification
1	China (H)	5	4	1	0	24	9	+15	13	Semi-finals
2	South Korea	5	4	0	1	42	8	+34	12	Semi-finals
3	Malaysia	5	3	1	1	36	11	+25	10	Fifth place game
4	Oman	5	2	0	3	14	35	−21	6	Seventh place game
5	Indonesia	5	1	0	4	7	28	−21	3	Ninth place game
6	Thailand	5	0	0	5	3	35	−32	0	Eleventh place game

Source: FIH
Rules for classification: 1) points; 2) matches won; 3) goal difference; 4) goals for; 5) head-to-head result; 6) field goals for.
(H) Hosts

=== Medal round ===
Semi-finals
4 October
India	5
South Korea	3
4 October
China	2
Japan	3

Gold medal match
6 October
India	5
Japan	1
Bronze medal match
6 October
South Korea	2
China	1

=== Final standings ===
Pos	Team	Qualification
1st place, gold medalist(s)	India	2024 Summer Olympics
2nd place, silver medalist(s)	Japan	2024 FIH Hockey Olympic Qualifiers
3rd place, bronze medalist(s)	South Korea	2024 FIH Hockey Olympic Qualifiers
4	China (H)	2024 FIH Hockey Olympic Qualifiers
5	Pakistan	2024 FIH Hockey Olympic Qualifiers
6	Malaysia	2024 FIH Hockey Olympic Qualifiers
7	Oman	
8	Bangladesh	
9	Indonesia	
10	Uzbekistan	
11	Thailand	
12	Singapore	

Source: FIH
(H) Host

== 2023 Pan American Games ==
=== Qualified teams ===
Qualification	Date	Host	Quota(s)	Qualified team
Host country	—N/a		~~1~~	—N/a
2022 Pan American Cup	20–30 January	(Chile) Santiago	~~2~~ 4	Canada; United States; Brazil; Peru
2022 South American Games	3–11 October	(Paraguay) Asunción	2	Argentina; Chile
2023 Central American and Caribbean Games	28 June – 6 July	(Dominican Republic) Santo Domingo	2	Mexico; Trinidad and Tobago
Total			8	

- Chile finished in the top two at the 2022 South American Games, meaning the host nation quota was reallocated as an additional quota through the 2022 Pan American Cup.
- Since Canada and the USA qualified through the Pan American Cup, an additional spot was available through the event.

=== Preliminary round ===
==== Pool A ====
Pos	Team	Pld	W	D	L	GF	GA	GD	Pts	Qualification
1	Argentina	3	3	0	0	35	2	+33	9	Semi-finals
2	Chile (H)	3	2	0	1	21	3	+18	6	Semi-finals
3	Mexico	3	1	0	2	7	16	−9	3	5th–8th classification
4	Peru	3	0	0	3	1	43	−42	0	5th–8th classification

Source: FIH
Rules for classification: 1) points; 2) matches won; 3) goal difference; 4) goals for; 5) head-to-head result; 6) field goals for.
(H) Hosts

==== Pool B ====
Pos	Team	Pld	W	D	L	GF	GA	GD	Pts	Qualification
1	Canada	3	3	0	0	8	1	+7	9	Semi-finals
2	United States	3	2	0	1	12	4	+8	6	Semi-finals
3	Brazil	3	1	0	2	3	8	−5	3	5th–8th classification
4	Trinidad and Tobago	3	0	0	3	2	12	−10	0	5th–8th classification

Source: FIH
Rules for classification: 1) points; 2) matches won; 3) goal difference; 4) goals for; 5) head-to-head result; 6) field goals for.

=== Medal round ===
Semi-finals
1 November
Argentina	2
United States	0
1 November
Canada	1 (2)
Chile	1 (3)

Gold medal match
3 November
Argentina	3
Chile	1
Bronze medal match
3 November
United States	2
Canada	3

=== Final standings ===
Pos	Team	Qualification
1st place, gold medalist(s)	Argentina	2024 Summer Olympics
2nd place, silver medalist(s)	Chile (H)	2024 FIH Hockey Olympic Qualifiers
3rd place, bronze medalist(s)	Canada	2024 FIH Hockey Olympic Qualifiers
4	United States	
5	Brazil	
6	Mexico	
7	Trinidad and Tobago	
8	Peru	

Source: FIH
(H) Host

== 2023 African Olympic Qualifier ==
=== Qualified teams ===
Qualification	Date	Host	Berths	Qualified team
FIH World Rankings	—N/a	—N/a	2	South Africa; Egypt
Northeast African Qualifying Tournament	6 June 2022	Cancelled	2	Kenya; Uganda
Northwest African Qualifying Tournament	25 August 2022	Cancelled	2	Ghana; Nigeria
FIH Central and South Africa Qualifying Tournament	31 August – 4 September 2022	(Zimbabwe) Harare	2	Zimbabwe; Zambia
Total			8	

=== Preliminary round ===
==== Pool A ====
Pos	Team	Pld	W	D	L	GF	GA	GD	Pts	Qualification
1	South Africa (H)	3	3	0	0	29	2	+27	9	Semi-finals
2	Uganda	3	1	0	2	6	13	−7	3	Semi-finals
3	Nigeria	3	1	0	2	6	16	−10	3	Fifth to eighth place classification
4	Zimbabwe	3	1	0	2	5	15	−10	3	Fifth to eighth place classification

Source: FIH
Rules for classification: 1) points; 2) matches won; 3) goal difference; 4) goals for; 5) head-to-head result; 6) field goals for.
(H) Hosts

==== Pool B ====
Pos	Team	Pld	W	D	L	GF	GA	GD	Pts	Qualification
1	Egypt	3	3	0	0	7	1	+6	9	Semi-finals
2	Ghana	3	2	0	1	6	3	+3	6	Semi-finals
3	Kenya	3	1	0	2	2	5	−3	3	Fifth to eighth place classification
4	Zambia	3	0	0	3	2	8	−6	0	Fifth to eighth place classification

Source: FIH
Rules for classification: 1) points; 2) matches won; 3) goal difference; 4) goals for; 5) head-to-head result; 6) field goals for.

=== Medal round ===
Semi-finals
3 November
South Africa	7
Ghana	0
3 November
Egypt	9
Uganda	1

Final
5 November
South Africa	2
Egypt	1
Third place
5 November
Ghana	7
Uganda	1

=== Final standings ===
Pos	Team	Qualification
1	South Africa (H)	2024 Summer Olympics
2	Egypt	2024 FIH Hockey Olympic Qualifiers
3	Ghana	
4	Uganda	
5	Nigeria	
6	Kenya	
7	Zambia	
8	Zimbabwe	

Source: FIH
(H) Host

== FIH Hockey Olympic Qualifiers ==
=== Qualified teams ===
Qualification	Date	Host	Berths	Qualified team
2023 EuroHockey Championship II	23–29 July 2023	(Republic of Ireland) Dublin	2	Ireland; Ukraine
2023 Oceania Cup	10–13 August 2023	(New Zealand) Whangarei	1	New Zealand
2023 EuroHockey Championship	19–27 August 2023	(Germany) Mönchengladbach	5	Great Britain; Belgium; Germany; Spain; Austria
2022 Asian Games	24 September − 6 October 2023	(China) Hangzhou	5	Japan; South Korea; China; Pakistan; Malaysia
2023 Pan American Games	25 October – 3 November 2023	(Chile) Santiago	2	Chile; Canada
2023 African Olympic Qualifier	29 October – 5 November 2023	(South Africa) Pretoria	1	Egypt
Total			16	

=== Final standings ===
Pos	Team	Qualification
1	Germany	2024 Summer Olympics
2	Great Britain	2024 Summer Olympics
3	New Zealand	2024 Summer Olympics
4	Pakistan	
5	Malaysia	
6	Canada	
7	Chile	
8	China	

Source: FIH

Pos	Team	Qualification
1	Belgium	2024 Summer Olympics
2	Spain (H)	2024 Summer Olympics
3	Ireland	2024 Summer Olympics
4	South Korea	
5	Egypt	
6	Austria	
7	Japan	
8	Ukraine	

Source: FIH
(H) Host

== See also ==
- Field hockey at the 2024 Summer Olympics – Women's qualification
