= 2025 Men's Hockey Central-South Africa Qualifier for the Africa Cup of Nations =

Tournament details
- Host country: Zimbabwe
- City: Harare
- Dates: 17–21 August 2024
- Teams: 4 (from 1 confederation)
- Venue(s): St. John's College Astro Turf

Final positions
- Champions: Namibia
- Runner-up: Zambia
- Third place: Zimbabwe

Tournament statistics
- Matches played: 8
- Goals scored: 96 (12 per match)
- Top scorer(s): (Namibia) Liam Hermanus (11 goals)

The 2025 Men's Hockey Central-South Africa Qualifier for the Africa Cup of Nations was a qualification event for the Africa Cup of Nations. It was held alongside the women's qualifier in Harare, Zimbabwe from 17 to 24 August 2024.

Namabia won the tournament by defeating Zambia 4–0 in the final. As the top two teams they qualified for the 2025 Africa Cup of Nations.

== Teams ==
Eswatini
2. Graham Oswin-Sparham
3. Nathan Surtee
4. Wayne Sparham
6. Michael Melvin
7. Malachi Rudd
8. Jason Quaynor
9. Tristan Rijkenberg
10. Ozayo Mamba
12. Khayalethu Mlotsa
15. Siyabulela Mapanzene
16. Zinhle Maseko
17. Mhlengi Fakudze (C)
18. Rory Thomson
19. Dylan Kirk
20. Zwilakhe Nxumalo
32. Celumusa Msibi (GK)
~~Malawi~~
Namibia
1. David Strauss (C, GK)
2. Richter van Rooyen (GK)
3. Giovane Handura
4. Dian La Cock
5. Liam Hermanus
6. David Britz
7. Fagan Hansen
8. John-Paul Britz
9. Josh van der Merwe
11. Percy Barthram
12. Dakota Hansen
13. Pieter Jacobs (C)
14. Matukaramove Kavikairiua
15. Owen Hatton
16. Jack Fourie
17. Dylan Finch
18. Delron Handura
19. Brynn Cleak
Zambia
1. Robson Kunda (GK)
1. Jeff Phiri (GK)
4. Samson Tembo (C)
5. Simon Banda
6. Wisdom Simwanza
7. Phillimon Bwali
8. Steward Chalwe
9. Andrew Ngulube
12. Dominic Mulenga
13. Richard Banda
15. Kennedy Siwale
15. George Jere
18. Fredrick Kaluba
Zimbabwe
1. Fleming Mazuwa (GK)
3. Gift Chomunorwa (C)
4. Takunda Muchacha
5. Daniel Erasmus
6. Esau Mufandaedza
7. Tadiwanashe Kamusewu
8. Pritchard Matambo
9. Forbes Motsi
10. Alec Chomunorwa
11. Constantine Muchono
12. Musa Mbonakamwe
13. Tafadzwa Mugore
15. Phinias Makarara
17. Asme Mpofu
18. Eliah Mangere (GK)
20. Amos Chomunorwa
27. Tatenda Kanyangarara
28. Mutsawashe Kanyangarara

== Preliminary round ==
All times are local (All times are local (UTC+2)

=== Standings ===
Pos	Team	Pld	W	D	L	GF	GA	GD	Pts	Qualification
1	Namibia	3	3	0	0	38	2	+36	9	Final
2	Zambia	3	2	0	1	21	8	+13	6	Final
3	Zimbabwe (H)	3	1	0	2	11	9	+2	3	Third place match
4	Eswatini	3	0	0	3	0	51	−51	0	Third place match

Source: FIH
Rules for classification: 1) points; 2) matches won; 3) goal difference; 4) goals for; 5) head-to-head result; 6) field goals for.
(H) Hosts

=== Results ===
17 August 2024
12:00

Namibia	28–0	Eswatini
Barthram 1'; Hermanus 2', 8', 11', 13', 34', 44'; Finch 14', 57', 58'; Hatton 15', 26'; JP Britz 16', 30'; Hansen 19', 35'; Cleak 19', 39', 40'; Van der Merwe 21', 36'; Jacobs 29', 42'; Fourie 44'; Hansen 54', 55', 59'; La Cock 60+'	Report

Umpires:
Munashe Mashoko (ZIM)
Daniel Matavata (MAW)

17 August 2024
16:00

Zimbabwe	3–4	Zambia
Am. Chomunorwa 3'; T. Kanyangarara 17', 44'	Report	Chalwe 9'; Mpande 20', 40', 57'

Umpires:
Chad Fourie (RSA)
Siyabonga Martins (NAM)

18 August 2024
12:00

Zambia	17–0	Eswatini
Mpande 2', 6', 25', 26', 51', 54', 58'; Ngulube 13', 23'; Bwali 16', 34', 37', 59'; Mwale 20'; Steinemann 56'; Banda 56', 58'	Report

Umpires:
Siyabonga Martins (NAM)
Daniel Matavata (MAW)

18 August 2024
16:00

Namibia	5–2	Zimbabwe
Jacobs 10'; Cleak 10', 52'; Van der Merwe 13'; Finch 44'	Report	T. Kanyangarara 28'; Am. Chomunorwa 37'

Umpires:
Chad Fourie (RSA)
Abraham Chaya (ZAM)

20 August 2024
12:00

Zambia	0–5	Namibia
	Report	D. Britz 5'; Cleak 32'; Hermanus 33', 36'; Hansen 50'

Umpires:
Munashe Mashoko (ZIM)
Chad Fourie (RSA)

20 August 2024
16:00

Zimbabwe	6–0	Eswatini
Kamusewu 2'; T. Kanyangarara 38', 45'; Motsi 41'; Al. Chomunorwa 50', 56'	Report

Umpires:
Daniel Matavata (MAW)
Abraham Chaya (ZAM)

== First to fourth place classification ==
=== Third and fourth place ===
21 August 2024
11:15

Zimbabwe	22–0	Eswatini
Mpofu 3', 45', 60+'; M. Kanyangarara 4', 30', 30', 47'; Mugore 8'; Kamusewu 13', 58'; Muchono 16'; Motsi 20', 33'; Am. Chomunorwa 26'; G. Chomunorwa 27', 51', 57', 59'; Al. Chomunorwa 28'; T. Kanyangarara 44', 55'; Erasmus 57'	Report

Umpires:
Siyabonga Martins (NAM)
Abraham Chaya (ZAM)

=== Final ===
21 August 2024
15:45

Namibia	4–0	Zambia
Hermanus 37', 42', 50'; Hansen 51'	Report

Umpires:
Chad Fourie (RSA)
Munashe Mashoko (ZIM)

== Statistics ==
=== Final standings ===
Pos	Team	Qualification
1	Namibia	2025 Africa Cup of Nations
2	Zambia	2025 Africa Cup of Nations
3	Zimbabwe (H)	
4	Eswatini	

Source: FIH
(H) Host

=== Goalscorers ===
There were 96 goals scored in 8 matches, for an average of 12 goals per match.

11 goals

- (Namibia) Liam Hermanus

10 goals

- (Zambia) Alfred Mpande

7 goals

- (Zimbabwe) Tatenda Kanyangarara

6 goals

- (Namibia) Brynn Cleak

5 goals

- (Namibia) Fagan Hansen

4 goals

- (Namibia) Dylan Finch
- (Zambia) Phillimon Bwali
- (Zimbabwe) Gift Chomunorwa
- (Zimbabwe) Mutsawashe Kanyangarara

3 goals

- (Namibia) Pieter Jacobs
- (Namibia) Josh van der Merwe
- (Zimbabwe) Alec Chomunorwa
- (Zimbabwe) Amos Chomunorwa
- (Zimbabwe) Tadiwanashe Kamusewu
- (Zimbabwe) Forbes Motsi
- (Zimbabwe) Asme Mpofu

2 goals

- (Namibia) John-Paul Britz
- (Namibia) Dakota Hansen
- (Namibia) Owen Hatton
- (Zambia) Richard Banda
- (Zambia) Andrew Ngulube

1 goal

- (Namibia) Percy Barthram
- (Namibia) David Britz
- (Namibia) Jack Fourie
- (Namibia) Dian La Cock
- (Zambia) Steward Chalwe
- (Zambia) Moses Mwale
- (Zambia) Christopher Steinemann
- (Zimbabwe) Daniel Erasmus
- (Zimbabwe) Constantine Muchono
- (Zimbabwe) Tafadzwa Mugore

Source: FIH
