= 2023 Men's Hockey Africa Qualifier for All Africa Games =

Africa men's field hockey competition

Africa Qualifier for All Africa Games
Tournament details
- Host country: Nigeria; Zimbabwe
- Dates: 25 August 2022–4 September 2022
- Venue(s): 1 (in 1 host city)

The 2023 Men's Hockey Africa Qualifier for All Africa Games will be a series of 3 qualification events for the 2023 African Games in Accra, Ghana. The tournaments will be held in Nigeria and Zimbabwe between August - September 2022. The winners of each tournament will qualify for the 2023 Africa Games and African Olympic Qualifier.

== Qualification ==
Dates	Event	Location	Quotas	Qualifier(s)
6 June 2022	North-East Africa qualifier	Cancelled	2	Kenya; Uganda
25–30 August 2022	North-West Africa qualifier	Cancelled	2	Ghana; Nigeria; ~~Sierra Leone~~
31 August – 4 September 2022	Central-South Africa qualifier	Harare, Zimbabwe	2	Malawi; Zimbabwe; Zambia

== Central-South Africa qualifier ==
Central-South Africa Qualifier for All Africa Games
Tournament details
- Host country: Zimbabwe
- City: Harare
- Dates: 31 August – 4 September 2022
- Venue(s): St. John's College Astro Turf

Final positions
- Champions: Zimbabwe
- Runner-up: Zambia
- Third place: Malawi

Tournament statistics
- Matches played: 4
- Goals scored: 23 (5.75 per match)
- Top scorer(s): (Zambia) Phillimon Bwali (5 goals)
- Best player: (Zambia) Phillimon Bwali
- Best goalkeeper: (Zimbabwe) Bradley Heuer

=== Standings ===
Pos	Team	Pld	W	D	L	GF	GA	GD	Pts	Qualification
1	Zambia	2	2	0	0	8	3	+5	6	Final
2	Zimbabwe (H)	2	1	0	1	8	4	+4	3	Final
3	Malawi	2	0	0	2	2	11	−9	0	

Source: FIH
Rules for classification: 1) points; 2) matches won; 3) goal difference; 4) goals for; 5) head-to-head result; 6) field goals for.
(H) Hosts

=== Results ===
31 August 2022
16:00

Zimbabwe	6–1	Malawi
Maredza 13'; T. Kanyangarara 17', 37'; M. Kanyangarara 24'; Chamunorwa 44'; Mushayakarara 57'	Report	Chirwa 42'

Umpires:
Ayden Shrives (RSA)
Abraham Chaya (ZAM)

1 September 2022
14:00

Zambia	3–2	Zimbabwe
Mpande 1'; Bwali 54'; Moyo 57'	Report	T. Kanyangarara 7'; Maredza 60'

Umpires:
Ayden Shrives (RSA)
Levi Kumwenda (MAW)

3 September 2022
16:00

Malawi	1–5	Zambia
Matavata 25'	Report	Bwali 29', 35', 36'; Moyo 32'; Chomba 59'

Umpires:
Ayden Shrives (RSA)
Bryn Lowe (ZIM)

=== Final ===
4 September 2022
14:00

Zambia	2–3	Zimbabwe
Bwali 7'; Mpande 17'	Report	Maredza 2'; Mugore 15'; Mushayakarara 60'

Umpires:
Ayden Shrives (RSA)
Bryn Lowe (ZIM)

=== Awards ===
The following awards were given at the conclusion of the tournament.

Top Goalscorer	Player of the Tournament	Goalkeeper of the Tournament
(Zambia) Phillimon Bwali	(Zambia) Phillimon Bwali	(Zimbabwe) Bradley Heuer

=== Goalscorers ===
There were 23 goals scored in 4 matches, for an average of 5.75 goals per match.

5 goals

- (Zambia) Phillimon Bwali

3 goals

- (Zimbabwe) Tatenda Kanyangarara
- (Zimbabwe) Tendayi Maredza

2 goals

- (Zambia) Andrew Moyo
- (Zambia) Alfred Mpande
- (Zimbabwe) Tapiwa Mushayakarara

1 goal

- (Malawi) Temwa Chirwa
- (Malawi) Daniel Matavata
- (Zambia) Floyd Chomba
- (Zimbabwe) Alec Chamunorwa
- (Zimbabwe) Mutsawashe Kanyangarara
- (Zimbabwe) Tafadzwa Mugore

Source: FIH
