= 2025 Women's Hockey Central-South Africa Qualifier for the Africa Cup of Nations =

Field hockey tournament

Tournament details
- Host country: Zimbabwe
- City: Harare
- Dates: 17 – 21 August 2024
- Teams: 4 (from 1 confederation)
- Venue: St. John's College Astro Turf

Final positions
- Champions: Namibia (1st title)
- Runner-up: Zimbabwe
- Third place: Zambia

Tournament statistics
- Matches played: 8
- Goals scored: 81 (10.13 per match)
- Top scorer: (Zambia) Carol Nakombe (14 goals)

The 2025 Women's Hockey Central-South Africa Qualifier for the Africa Cup of Nations was a series of 3 qualification events for the Africa Cup of Nations. It was held alongside the men's tournament in Harare, Zimbabwe from 17 – 24 August 2024.

Namabia won their first title the Zimbabwe in the final 3–1. The top three teams qualified for the 2025 Africa Cup of Nations.

Eswatini
1. Nina Hlophe (GK)
2. Kayleigh Henwood
3. Laiken Henwood
4. Mvali Thwala
5. Sakhelwe Dlamini
6. Leila Carmichael
7. Tiffany Maphosa
8. Temnotfo Thwala
9. Taylor Hulley
10. Sihlelelwe Siphiwokuhle
11. Amy Melvin
13. Neliswa Ngcamphalala
14. Chloe Boyd
15. Lomave Dlamini
16. Wandziswa Mbingo
20. Marika Neethling
23. Anri Els
24. Charlize Rix
~~Malawi~~
Namibia
1. Petro Stoffberg (GK)
2. Adoré Meyer
3. Azaylee Philander
4. Sunelle Ludwig
5. Kiana-Che Cormack (C)
6. Annica Higgs
7. Danja Meyer
9. Jerrica Bartlett
10. Milah Malan
11. Kyla Landsberg
12. Gillian Hermanus
14. Anine le Roux
16. Berencia Diamond (GK)
17. Mia Karsten
19. Taramarie Myburgh
20. Marika Neethling
23. Anri Els
24. Charlize Rix
Zambia
1. Esther Mwale (GK)
2. Brenda Kalunga
3. Cleopatra Bwanga
3. Falesy Zulu
4. Mary Mwewa
5. Beauty Mwachunga
8. Martha Kalomo
9. Memory Chaya
10. Eniless Mambwe
11. Martha Nankala (C)
12. Harriet Mutangama
14. Delphister Miyato
14. Winaa Munsanda
16. Priscilla Chipolepole (GK)
17. Loveness Mudenda
18. Carol Nakombe
Zimbabwe
1. Tanatswa Mutaramuswa (GK)
2. Theodora Chingombe (GK)
4. Emma Reilly
5. Ruvarashe Mushavi
6. Rumbidzi Zimuto
7. Alea Musakaruka
8. Athina Mujiba
9. Nicole Nyamapfeka
10. Mufarowashe Matambo
11. Kelcy Ndoro
12. Amber Tozana
13. Iman Johnson
14. Tinodiwanashe Elijah
15. Trish Mukumba
16. Nyasha Nyaguze
17. Tsungai Chadzinya
18. Farirai Nengare (C)
19. Sheunopa Murahwi

== Preliminary round ==
All times are local (All times are local (UTC+2)

Pos	Team	Pld	W	D	L	GF	GA	GD	Pts	Qualification
1	Namibia	3	2	1	0	24	1	+23	7	Final
2	Zimbabwe (H)	3	2	0	1	17	5	+12	6	Final
3	Zambia	3	1	1	1	19	5	+14	4	Third and fourth place
4	Eswatini	3	0	0	3	0	49	−49	0	Third and fourth place

Source: FIH
Rules for classification: 1) points; 2) matches won; 3) goal difference; 4) goals for; 5) head-to-head result; 6) field goals for.
(H) Hosts

17 August 2024
10:00

Namibia	20–0	Eswatini
Rix 4', 15'; Els 5', 21', 36', 40'; Higgs 6', 7'; Le Roux 20'; Neethling 22'; Myburgh 25', 32', 45'; Meyer 28'; Cormack 35', 41', 55'; Malan 38'; Karsten 48', 53'	Report

Umpires:
Sharne Mayers (ZIM)
Mari-Elize Swart (RSA)

17 August 2024
14:00

Zimbabwe	4–2	Zambia
Nyaguze 6'; Elijah 22'; Mukumba 52', 59'	Report	Nakombe 31'; Miyato 36'

Umpires:
Irene Handura (NAM)
Peter Chasusa (ESW)

18 August 2024
10:00

Zambia	16–0	Eswatini
Miyato 3'; Kalomo 6', 17', 33'; Mudenda 14', 43', 44'; Mambwe 18', 45', 54'; Nakombe 18', 19', 55', 55', 57'; Kalunga 57'	Report

Umpires:
Sharne Mayers (ZIM)
Irene Handura (NAM)

18 August 2024
14:00

Namibia	3–0	Zimbabwe
Cormack 22', 30'; Myburgh 34'	Report

Umpires:
Rita Katoka (ZAM)
Mari-Elize Swart (RSA)

20 August 2024
10:00

Zambia	1–1	Namibia
Nakombe 51'	Report	Meyer 50'

Umpires:
Sharne Mayers (ZIM)
Peter Chasusa (ESW)

20 August 2024
14:00

Zimbabwe	13–0	Eswatini
Elijah 2', 13', 19', 35'; Tozana 5', 48'; Matambo 8'; Musakaruka 11'; Reilly 42'; Mujiba 51'; Murahwi 52'; Mukumba 55'; Zimuto 59'	Report

Umpires:
Rita Katoka (ZAM)
Irene Handura (NAM)

== First to fourth place classification ==
=== Third and fourth place ===
21 August 2024
09:00

Zambia	17–0	Eswatini
Kalomo 6', 19', 32'; Nakombe 14', 42', 43', 51', 54', 55', 60'; Chaya 21', 26', 33'; Mudenda 39', 41'; Nankala 51'; Mutangama 57'	Report

Umpires:
Daniel Matavata (MAW)
Rita Katoka (ZAM)

=== Final ===
21 August 2024
13:30

Namibia	3–1	Zimbabwe
Cormack 21'; Philander 38'; Myburgh 59'	Report	Mushavi 8'

Umpires:
Sharne Mayers (ZIM)
Mari-Elize Swart (RSA)

== Statistics ==
=== Final standings ===
Pos	Team	Status
1st place, gold medalist(s)	Namibia	Qualified for 2025 Africa Cup of Nations
2nd place, silver medalist(s)	Zimbabwe (H)	Qualified for 2025 Africa Cup of Nations
3rd place, bronze medalist(s)	Zambia	Qualified for 2025 Africa Cup of Nations
4	Eswatini	

Source: FIH
(H) Host

=== Goalscorers ===
There were 81 goals scored in 8 matches, for an average of 10.1 goals per match.

14 goals

- (Zambia) Carol Nakombe

6 goals

- (Namibia) Kiana-Che Cormack
- (Zambia) Martha Kalomo
- (Zimbabwe) Tinodiwanashe Elijah

5 goals

- (Namibia) Taramarie Myburgh
- (Zambia) Loveness Mudenda

4 goals

- (Namibia) Anri Els

3 goals

- (Zambia) Memory Chaya
- (Zambia) Eniless Mambwe

2 goals

- (Namibia) Annica Higgs
- (Namibia) Mia Karsten
- (Namibia) Adoré Meyer
- (Namibia) Charlize Rix
- (Zambia) Delphister Miyato
- (Zimbabwe) Trish Mukumba
- (Zimbabwe) Amber Tozana

1 goal

- (Namibia) Anine le Roux
- (Namibia) Milah Malan
- (Namibia) Marika Neethling
- (Namibia) Azaylee Philander
- (Zambia) Brenda Kalunga
- (Zambia) Harriet Mutangama
- (Zambia) Martha Nankala
- (Zimbabwe) Mufarowashe Matambo
- (Zimbabwe) Athina Mujiba
- (Zimbabwe) Sheunopa Murahwi
- (Zimbabwe) Alea Musakaruka
- (Zimbabwe) Ruvarashe Mushavi
- (Zimbabwe) Nyasha Nyaguze
- (Zimbabwe) Emma Reilly
- (Zimbabwe) Rumbidzi Zimuto

Source: FIH

== See also ==
- 2025 Men's Hockey Central-South Africa Qualifier for the Africa Cup of Nations
