= Marié Louw =

South African field hockey player

Personal information
- Full name: Marié Antonette Louw
- Born: 9 February 1996 (age 30) Bloemfontein, South Africa

Sport
- Sport: Field hockey
- Position: Forward
- Club: Bohemian Hockey Club
National team
| Years | Team | Caps | Goals |
| 2016 | South Africa U–21 | 10 | (14) |
| 2022– | South Africa | 32 | (6) |
Medal record
Women's field hockey
Representing South Africa
Junior Africa Cup
| Gold medal – first place | 2016 Windhoek |
African Olympic Qualifiers
| Gold medal – first place | 2023 Pretoria |

Marié Antonette 'Antonet' Louw (born 9 February 1996) is a South African field hockey player.

In 2024 she became an Olympian, representing South Africa at the XXXIII Olympic Games in Paris.

== Early life ==
Marié Louw was born on 9 February 1996, in Bloemfontein, South Africa.

She is an alumna of C&N Sekondêre Meisieskool Oranje, the University of Massachusetts and University of the Free State. She now teaches Afrikaans at Merrifield college and preparatory School in East London.

== Career ==
=== Under–21 ===
Louw made her international debut for South Africa at under–21 level. She earned her first junior caps for the U–21 squad at the 2016 Junior Africa Cup in Windhoek, where she won a gold medal. She followed this up with an appearance at the FIH Junior World Cup in Santiago later in the year.

=== Senior national team ===
After not being selected for a national squad in six years, Louw returned to international competition in 2022. She was called into the senior national squad for the first time for tour to Valencia. There, she made her international debut in a test series against Italy, followed by appearances at the inaugural FIH Nations Cup.

Throughout 2023, Louw continued representing the national team on international tours. She also won her first medal with the senior team, taking home gold at the Olympic Qualifiers in Pretoria, securing South Africa a place at the Summer Olympics.

Louw was named in the South African squad to compete at the XXXIII Olympic Games in Paris. She played in three pool matches, scoring one goal in South Africa's loss to Argentina.

==== International goals ====
| Goal | Date | Location | Opponent | Score | Result | Competition | Ref. |
|---|---|---|---|---|---|---|---|
| 1 | 29 October 2023 | Tuks Astro, Pretoria, South Africa | Zimbabwe | 10–0 | 10–0 | 2023 African Olympic Qualifiers | |
| 2 | 3 November 2023 | Tuks Astro, Pretoria, South Africa | Ghana | 6–0 | 10–0 | 2023 African Olympic Qualifiers | |
| 3 | 20 January 2024 | SACS Boys' School, Cape Town, South Africa | France | 2–1 | 2–1 | Test Match | |
| 4 | 6 July 2024 | Stade Jean Luc Delloye, Cambrai, France | France | 1–0 | 4–0 | Test Match | |
| 5 | 6 July 2024 | Stade Jean Luc Delloye, Cambrai, France | France | 2–0 | 4–0 | Test Match | |
| 6 | 29 July 2024 | Stade Yves-du-Manoir, Colombes, France | Argentina | 1–0 | 2–4 | 2024 Summer Olympics | |
