= Zambia women's national field hockey team =

Zambia
- Association: Zambia Hockey Association
- Confederation: AfHF (Africa)
- Head Coach: Floyd Chomba
- Captain: Annie Mvula

FIH ranking
- Current: 76 ▼1 (5 November 2025)

Africa Cup of Nations
- Appearances: 2 (first in 1990)
- Best result: 4th (1990)

The Zambia women's national field hockey team is the national women's team representing Zambia in field hockey.

== Tournament record ==
=== Africa Cup of Nations ===
- 1990 – 4th
- 2017 – Withdrew
- 2022 – 7th
- 2025 – WD

=== African Olympic Qualifier ===
- 2023 – 6th

=== Central-South Africa Qualifier for the Africa Cup of Nations ===
- 2025 – (bronze)

== See also ==
- Zambia men's national field hockey team
