= 2023 Women's African Olympic Qualifier =

Field hockey tournament

African Hockey Road To Paris 2024

Tournament details
- Host country: South Africa
- City: Pretoria
- Dates: 29 October – 5 November
- Teams: 7 (from 1 confederation)
- Venue: Tuks Astro

Final positions
- Champions: South Africa (5th title)
- Runner-up: Nigeria
- Third place: Kenya

Tournament statistics
- Matches played: 15
- Goals scored: 71 (4.73 per match)
- Top scorer: (South Africa) Tarryn Lombard (7 goals)
- Best goalkeeper: (Nigeria) Martha Uko
- Fair play award: Zimbabwe

The 2023 Women's African Olympic Qualifier was the fifth edition of the African qualification tournament for the women's field hockey event at the Summer Olympics. It was held alongside the men's tournament in Pretoria, South Africa from 29 October to 5 November 2023.

South Africa, as the winner of the tournament, qualified for the 2024 Summer Olympics.

== Qualification ==
Qualification	Date	Host	Berths	Qualified team
FIH World Rankings	—N/a	—N/a	2	South Africa; Ghana
Northeast African Qualifying Tournament	6 June 2022	Cancelled	2	Kenya; ~~Uganda~~
Northwest African Qualifying Tournament	25 August 2022	Cancelled	2	Nigeria; Zambia^{*}
FIH Central and South Africa Qualifying Tournament	31 August – 4 September 2022	(Zimbabwe) Harare	2	Zimbabwe; Namibia
Total			8	

^* – Zambia selected by African Hockey Federation Executive Board to complete 8 teams for the Women Olympic Qualification Tournament

== Preliminary round ==
All times are local (UTC+2).

=== Pool A ===
Pos	Team	Pld	W	D	L	GF	GA	GD	Pts	Qualification
1	South Africa (H)	2	2	0	0	14	0	+14	6	Semi-finals
2	Nigeria	2	1	0	1	2	5	−3	3	Semi-finals
3	Zimbabwe	2	0	0	2	1	12	−11	0	Fifth to seventh place classification

Source: FIH
Rules for classification: 1) points; 2) matches won; 3) goal difference; 4) goals for; 5) head-to-head result; 6) field goals for.
(H) Hosts

29 October 2023
17:00 (Note: The start time was moved back due to a lightning.)

South Africa	10–0	Zimbabwe
Bobbs 4', 33', 51'; Mokoena 9', 17'; Lombard 15', 25'; Du Toit 40'; Wood 46'; Louw 59'	Report

University of Pretoria, Pretoria
Umpires:
Magali Sergeant (BEL)
Charity Majimbo (KEN)

30 October 2023
18:00

Nigeria	0–4	South Africa
	Report	Lombard 20'; Wood 23'; Seerane 33'; Paton 53'

University of Pretoria, Pretoria
Umpires:
Rita Katoka (ZAM)
Charity Majimbo (KEN)

1 November 2023
08:00

Zimbabwe	1–2	Nigeria
A. Terblanche 45'	Report	Saturday 39', 55'

University of Pretoria, Pretoria
Umpires:
Melissa Taylor (RSA)
Evelyn Fiador (GHA)

=== Pool B ===
Pos	Team	Pld	W	D	L	GF	GA	GD	Pts	Qualification
1	Kenya	3	3	0	0	8	2	+6	9	Semi-finals
2	Ghana	3	2	0	1	11	5	+6	6	Semi-finals
3	Zambia	3	1	0	2	4	13	−9	3	Fifth to seventh place classification
4	Namibia	3	0	0	3	3	6	−3	0	Fifth to seventh place classification

Source: FIH
Rules for classification: 1) points; 2) matches won; 3) goal difference; 4) goals for; 5) head-to-head result; 6) field goals for.

29 October 2023
08:00

Ghana	2–1	Namibia
Berko 13'; Coffie 54'	Report	Rix 5'

University of Pretoria, Pretoria
Umpires:
Ymkje van Slooten (NED)
Melissa Taylor (RSA)

29 October 2023
10:00

Kenya	4–0	Zambia
Mutiva 12', 41'; Wachira 30'; Okumu 32'	Report

University of Pretoria, Pretoria
Umpires:
Irene Handura (NAM)
Evelyn Fiador (GHA)

30 October 2023
08:00

Namibia	2–3	Zambia
Semedo 37'; Meyer 47'	Report	Kalomo 8'; Nakombe 36'; Kaluba 50'

University of Pretoria, Pretoria
Umpires:
Munashe Mashoko (ZIM)
Ebitimi Sampou (NGR)

30 October 2023
14:00

Kenya	3–2	Ghana
Chebet 1'; Bwire 30'; Okumu 40'	Report	Berko 36', 48'

University of Pretoria, Pretoria
Umpires:
Ymkje van Slooten (NED)
Magali Sergeant (BEL)

1 November 2023
10:00

Ghana	7–1	Zambia
Berko 4', 11'; Antwi 26', 30'; Afriyie 37'; Ackon 40'; Narkuor 45'	Report	Munthali 4'

University of Pretoria, Pretoria
Umpires:
Magali Sergeant (BEL)
Irene Handura (NAM)

1 November 2023
12:00

Namibia	0–1	Kenya
	Report	Bwire 53'

University of Pretoria, Pretoria
Umpires:
Ymkje van Slooten (NED)
Ebitimi Sampou (NGR)

== Fifth to seventh place classification ==
=== Bracket ===
5–7th place semi-final
2 November
Zimbabwe	2 (0)
Namibia (p.s.o.)	2 (3)

Fifth place
4 November
Zambia	0
Namibia	3

=== 5–7th place semi-final ===
2 November 2023
08:00

Zimbabwe	2–2	Namibia
A. Terblanche 42'; Zimuto 44'	Report	Kruger 30'; Semedo 45'
Penalties
N. Terblanche (penalty shoot-out missed); Viviers (penalty shoot-out missed); Diplock (penalty shoot-out missed)	0–3	(penalty shoot-out scored) Myburgh; (penalty shoot-out scored) Kruger; (penalty shoot-out scored) Ludwig

University of Pretoria, Pretoria
Umpires:
Rita Katoka (ZAM)
Charity Majimbo (KEN)

=== Fifth place game ===
4 November 2023
09:15

Zambia	0–3	Namibia
	Report	Kruger 8', 46'; Rix 19'

University of Pretoria, Pretoria
Umpires:
Charity Majimbo (KEN)
Ebitimi Sampou (NGR)

== First to fourth place classification ==
=== Bracket ===
Semi-finals
3 November
South Africa	7
Ghana	0
3 November
Kenya	0
Nigeria	1

Final
5 November
South Africa	9
Nigeria	0
Third place
5 November
Ghana	1
Kenya	3

=== Semi-finals ===
3 November 2023
12:30

Kenya	0–1	Nigeria
	Report	Johnson 3'

University of Pretoria, Pretoria
Umpires:
Melissa Taylor (RSA)
Evelyn Fiador (GHA)

3 November 2023
17:00

South Africa	7–0	Ghana
Lombard 3'; De Waal 10'; Bobbs 12', 20'; Seerane 29'; Louw 30'; Wood 60'	Report

University of Pretoria, Pretoria
Umpires:
Ymkje van Slooten (NED)
Magali Sergeant (BEL)

=== Third place game ===
5 November 2023
12:00

Ghana	1–3	Kenya
Berko 10'	Report	Guchu 3'; Kemunto 7'; Chebet 33'

University of Pretoria, Pretoria
Umpires:
Melissa Taylor (RSA)
Irene Handura (NAM)

=== Final ===
5 November 2023
16:30

South Africa	9–0	Nigeria
Lombard 1', 14', 34'; Du Toit 17'; Bobbs 20'; Wood 22'; Augousti 23'; Isaacs 35'; Paton 49'	Report

University of Pretoria, Pretoria
Umpires:
Magali Sergeant (BEL)
Ymkje van Slooten (NED)

== Final standings ==
Pos	Team	Qualification
1	South Africa (H)	2024 Summer Olympics
2	Nigeria	
3	Kenya	
4	Ghana	
5	Namibia	
6	Zambia	
7	Zimbabwe	

Source: FIH
(H) Host

== Goalscorers ==
There were 71 goals scored in 15 matches, for an average of 4.73 goals per match.

7 goals

- (South Africa) Tarryn Lombard

6 goals

- (Ghana) Mavis Berko
- (South Africa) Quanita Bobbs

4 goals

- (South Africa) Bianca Wood

3 goals

- (Namibia) Jahntwa Kruger

2 goals

- (Ghana) Doris Antwi
- (Kenya) Eleanor Chebet
- (Kenya) Flavia Mutiva
- (Kenya) Maureen Okumu
- (Kenya) Lucy Wachira
- (Namibia) Charlize Rix
- (Namibia) Tisha Semedo
- (Nigeria) Comfort Saturday
- (South Africa) Jean-Leigh du Toit
- (South Africa) Marié Louw
- (South Africa) Ntsopa Mokoena
- (South Africa) Kristen Paton
- (South Africa) Celia Seerane
- (Zimbabwe) Alexei Terblanche

1 goal

- (Ghana) Mercy Ackon
- (Ghana) Lydia Afriyie
- (Ghana) Ernestina Coffie
- (Ghana) Vivian Narkuor
- (Kenya) Grace Bwire
- (Kenya) Caroline Guchu
- (Kenya) Naom Kemunto
- (Namibia) Adoré Meyer
- (Nigeria) Benedicta Johnson
- (South Africa) Taheera Augousti
- (South Africa) Paris-Gail Isaacs
- (South Africa) Kayla de Waal
- (Zambia) Martha Kalomo
- (Zambia) Christine Kaluba
- (Zambia) Margret Munthali
- (Zambia) Carol Nakombe
- (Zimbabwe) Rumbidzaiishe Zimuto

Source: FIH

== See also ==
- 2023 Men's African Olympic Qualifier
- Field hockey at the 2023 African Games
