= 2023 Women's Hockey Africa Qualifier for All Africa Games =

Africa women's field hockey competition

Africa Qualifier for All Africa Games
Tournament details
- Host country: Zimbabwe
- Dates: 25 August 2022–4 September 2025
- Venue: 1 (in 1 host city)

The 2023 Women's Hockey Africa Qualifier for All Africa Games will be a series of 1 qualification events for the 2023 African Games in Accra, Ghana. The tournaments will be held in Zimbabwe between August - September 2022. The winners of each tournament will qualify for the 2023 Africa Games and African Olympic Qualifier.

== Qualification ==
Dates	Event	Location	Quotas	Qualifier(s)
6 June 2022	North-East Africa qualifier	Cancelled	2	Kenya; Uganda
25–30 August 2022	North-West Africa qualifier	Cancelled	2	TBA
31 August – 4 September 2022	Central-South Africa qualifier	Harare, Zimbabwe	2	Namibia; Zimbabwe; Malawi

== Central-South Africa qualifier ==
Central-South Africa Qualifier for All Africa Games
Tournament details
- Host country: Zimbabwe
- City: Harare
- Dates: 31 August – 4 September 2022
- Venue: St. John's College Astro Turf

Final positions
- Champions: Zimbabwe
- Runner-up: Namibia
- Third place: Malawi

Tournament statistics
- Matches played: 4
- Goals scored: 27 (6.75 per match)
- Top scorer: (Zimbabwe) Alexi Terblanche (3 goals)
- Best player: (Zimbabwe) Khanyisile Mzizi
- Best goalkeeper: (Malawi) Eva Matengele

=== Standings ===
Pos	Team	Pld	W	D	L	GF	GA	GD	Pts	Qualification
1	Namibia	2	1	1	0	13	2	+11	4	Final
2	Zimbabwe (H)	2	1	1	0	13	2	+11	4	Final
3	Malawi	2	0	0	2	0	22	−22	0	

Source: FIH
Rules for classification: 1) points; 2) matches won; 3) goal difference; 4) goals for; 5) head-to-head result; 6) field goals for.
(H) Hosts

=== Results ===
31 August 2022
14:00

Namibia	11–0	Malawi
Semedo 5', 28'; Schimming 7'; Gillies 9', 20'; Kruger 30'; Myburgh 32', 43'; Coetzee 34', 38'; Philander 55'	Report

Umpires:
Cynthia Clement (GHA)
Leecon Hadaga (ZIM)

1 September 2022
16:00

Zimbabwe	2–2	Namibia
A. Terblanche 3', 47'	Report	Schimming 19'; Kruger 50'

Umpires:
Cynthia Clement (GHA)
Fiskwani Katundu (ZAM)

3 September 2022
14:00

Malawi	0–11	Zimbabwe
	Report	Diplock 4', 37'; N. Terblanche 12', 53'; A. Terblanche 17', 56'; Elijah 30', 56', 57'; Viviers 35'; Beekes 36'

Umpires:
Cynthia Clement (GHA)
Irene Handura (NAM)

=== Final ===
4 September 2022
14:00

Zimbabwe	1–0	Namibia
Hess 38'	Report

Umpires:
Cynthia Clement (GHA)
Abraham Chaya (ZAM)

=== Awards ===
The following awards were given at the conclusion of the tournament.

Top Goalscorer	Player of the Tournament	Goalkeeper of the Tournament
(Zimbabwe) Alexi Terblanche	(Zimbabwe) Khanyisile Mzizi	(Malawi) Eva Matengele

=== Goalscorers ===
There have been 27 goals scored in 4 matches, for an average of 6.75 goals per match.

4 goals

- (Zimbabwe) Alexi Terblanche

3 goals

- (Zimbabwe) Tinodiwanashe Elijah

2 goals

- (Namibia) Anthea Coetzee
- (Namibia) Jaime Gillies
- (Namibia) Jivanka Kruger
- (Namibia) Taramarie Myburgh
- (Namibia) Kaela Schimming
- (Namibia) Tisha Semedo
- (Zimbabwe) Kelly Diplock
- (Zimbabwe) Natalie Terblanche

1 goal

- (Namibia) Azaylee Philander
- (Zimbabwe) Mercedes Beekes
- (Zimbabwe) Natasha Hess
- (Zimbabwe) Roxanne Viviers

Source: FIH
