= Zambia men's national field hockey team =

Zambia
- Association: Zambia Hockey Association
- Confederation: AfHF (Africa)
- Head Coach: Elvis Bwalya

FIH ranking
- Current: 90 (4 October 2026)

Africa Cup of Nations
- Appearances: 2 (first in 1983)
- Best result: 6th (1983, 2025)

African Games
- Appearances: 1987 (first in 1987)
- Best result: 6th (1983)

The Zambia men's national field hockey team is the national team representing Zambia in field hockey.

== Tournament record ==
=== Africa Cup of Nations ===
- 1983 – 6th place
- 2017 – Withdrew
- 2025 – 6th place

=== African Games ===
- 1987 – 7th

=== African Olympic Qualifier ===
- 2023 – 7th place

== See also ==
- Zambia women's national field hockey team
