= Argentina women's national field hockey squad records =

The Argentina women's national field hockey squad records are the results for women's international field hockey competitions. The sport is controlled by the Argentine Hockey Confederation, the governing body for field hockey in Argentina.

== Current senior squad ==
The women's squad for the current year has been last announced by Confederación Argentina de Hockey on 28 December 2023. Along the year, players have been added and some left behind, this being published in every list for the competitions and tours.

Technical Staff:

- Team Manager: Martín Elli
- Head Coach: Fernando Ferrara
- Assistant Coaches: Santiago Capurro and Ignacio Bergner
- Medical Doctor: Pablo Feijoo and Marcelo Montrasi
- Physiotherapist: Claudia Burkart and Catalina Maschwitz
- Physical Trainer: Leonardo Romagnoli
- Video Technician: Gonzalo Romero
- Team captains: Agostina Alonso and María José Granatto

=== 2026 squad ===
Players, caps and goals updated as of 21 October 2026.

| No. | Pos. | Player | Date of birth (age) | Caps | Goals | Club |
|---|---|---|---|---|---|---|
| 13 | GK | Cristina Cosentino | 22 December 1997 (age 28) – Buenos Aires | 87 | | (Argentine Football Association) Banco Nación |
| 32 | GK | Mercedes Artola ^{U21} | 16 January 2006 (age 20) — Buenos Aires | 11 | | (Argentine Football Association) River Plate |
| 15 | GK | Ana Luz Dodorico | 6 January 2000 (age 26) – (Córdoba Province, Argentina) Río Cuarto | 4 | | (Argentine Football Association) GEBA |
| 2 | DF | Sofía Toccalino | 20 March 1997 (age 29) — (Buenos Aires Province) Luján | 221 | 19 | (Royal Belgian Football Association) Gantoise |
| 3 | DF | Agustina Gorzelany | 11 March 1996 (age 30) – Buenos Aires | 166 | 116 | (Argentine Football Association) San Martín |
| 4 | DF | Valentina Raposo | 28 January 2003 (age 23) — Salta | 102 | 11 | (Argentine Football Association) Popeye Béisbol Club |
| 38 | DF | Chiara Ambrosini ^{U21} | 2 November 2006 (age 20) – Buenos Aires | 19 | 4 | (Argentine Football Association) Ferro |
| 24 | DF | Sol Lombardo | 10 March 1999 (age 27)–Buenos Aires | 18 | 0 | (Argentine Football Association) Italiano |
| 64 | DF | Milagros Alastra ^{U21} | 22 August 2006 (age 20) – Mendoza | 18 | 7 | (Argentine Football Association) GEBA |
| 43 | DF | Emma Knobl ^{U21} | 27 October 2005 (age 21) – Buenos Aires | 16 | 0 | (Argentine Football Association) Lomas |
| 55 | DF | Pilar Pishtón | 4 August 2004 (age 22) – Buenos Aires | 5 | 0 | (Argentine Football Association) Banco Nación |
| 41 | DF | Máxima Duportal | 8 June 2005 (age 21) — (Entre Ríos Province) Paraná | 0 | 0 | (Argentine Football Association) River Plate |
| 42 | DF | Juliana Guggini ▲ | 1 March 2001 (age 25) – Buenos Aires | 0 | 0 | (Argentine Football Association) Ciudad |
| 22 | MF | Eugenia Trinchinetti | 17 July 1997 (age 29) — (Buenos Aires Province) Victoria | 229 | 56 | (Royal Belgian Football Association) Braxgata |
| 5 | MF | Agostina Alonso | 1 October 1995 (age 31) – Buenos Aires | 204 | 8 | (Argentine Football Association) Banco Nación |
| 18 | MF | Victoria Sauze | 21 July 1991 (age 35) — (Tucumán Province) Yerba Buena | 177 | 7 | (Argentine Football Association) San Lorenzo |
| 26 | MF | Paula Ortiz | 16 April 1997 (age 29) — (Buenos Aires Province) Pablo Podestá | 106 | 15 | (Royal Spanish Football Federation) Real de Barcelona |
| 20 | MF | Sofía Cairó | 8 October 2002 (age 24) — Buenos Aires | 76 | 7 | (Argentine Football Association) Mariano Moreno |
| 25 | MF | Juana Castellaro ^{U21} | 29 March 2005 (age 21) — Buenos Aires | 65 | 2 | (German Football Association) Mannheimer |
| 29 | MF | Victoria Miranda | 5 June 2000 (age 26) – (Córdoba Province, Argentina) Río Cuarto | 58 | 3 | (Argentine Football Association) Ciudad |
| 45 | MF | Catalina Andrade | 7 February 2002 (age 24) – Buenos Aires | 32 | 10 | (Argentine Football Association) Italiano |
| 14 | MF | Victoria Falasco | 1 April 2004 (age 22) – (Buenos Aires Province) Las Flores | 23 | 4 | (Argentine Football Association) GEBA |
| 27 | MF | Sol Pagella | 26 February 2002 (age 24) — (Buenos Aires Province) San Fernando | 5 | 1 | (Argentine Football Association) San Fernando |
| 47 | MF | Pilar Palacio | 25 June 2003 (age 23) – (Buenos Aires Province) Coronel Suárez | 5 | 4 | (Argentine Football Association) River Plate |
| 35 | MF | Rocío Bianchi | 2 September 2006 (age 20) — (Santa Fe Province) Rosario | 0 | 0 | (Argentine Football Association) Universitario de Rosario |
| 40 | MF | Milagros di Santo ▲ | 3 October 2006 (age 20) – Buenos Aires | 0 | 0 | (Argentine Football Association) Lomas |
| 44 | MF | Trinidad Holmgren ▲ | 20 April 2005 (age 21) — (Buenos Aires Province) San Isidro | 0 | 0 | (Argentine Football Association) CASI |
| 46 | MF | Delfina Persoglia | 4 April 2005 (age 21) — (Santa Fe Province) Rosario | 0 | 0 | (Argentine Football Association) Universitario de Rosario |
| 10 | FW | María José Granatto | 21 April 1995 (age 31) — (Buenos Aires Province) La Plata | 261 | 149 | (Royal Belgian Football Association) Dragons |
| 28 | FW | Julieta Jankunas | 20 January 1999 (age 27) — (Córdoba Province, Argentina) Córdoba | 219 | 121 | (Argentine Football Association) Hacoaj |
| 21 | FW | Victoria Granatto | 9 April 1991 (age 35) — (Buenos Aires Province) La Plata | 87 | 22 | (Royal Belgian Football Association) Gantoise |
| 33 | FW | Zoe Díaz ^{U21} | 5 June 2006 (age 20) – Buenos Aires | 57 | 17 | (Argentine Football Association) Italiano |
| 11 | FW | Brisa Bruggesser | 25 July 2002 (age 24) – (Buenos Aires Province) Tandil | 43 | 16 | (Argentine Football Association) Ciudad |
| 23 | FW | Lara Casas | 22 June 2004 (age 22) – Buenos Aires | 40 | 11 | (Argentine Football Association) Italiano |
| 7 | FW | Lourdes Pisthón ^{U21} | 27 December 2007 (age 18) – Buenos Aires | 19 | 9 | (Argentine Football Association) Banco Nación |
| 49 | FW | Sol Guignet | 11 August 2004 (age 22) – Mendoza | 5 | 0 | (Argentine Football Association) GEBA |
| 30 | FW | Paula Santamarina | 27 August 2002 (age 24) – Tucumán | 2 | 0 | (Argentine Football Association) River Plate |
^{INA} Inactive^{INJ} Injured^{INV} Invitational^{U21} Training with the junior team

=== Changes from 2025 call-ups ===
Changes from last year call-ups and throughout the current year. Caps and goals updated as of December 2025

| Pos. | Player | Date of birth (age) | Caps | Goals | Club | Latest call-up |
|---|---|---|---|---|---|---|
| GK | Mariana Scandura | 2 May 1994 (age 32) — (Mendoza Province) Mendoza | 3 | | (Spain) RC Polo Barcelona | 7 June 2018, v. Uruguay |
| GK | Delfina Lazcano ▼ ^{DISMISSED IN AUGUST} | 23 August 2008 (age 18) — (Tucumán Province) Concepción | 0 | | (Argentina) San Lorenzo | Never played an official match |
| GK | Anezka Mauro ▼ ^{DISMISSED IN AUGUST} | 2007 — Buenos Aires | 0 | | (Argentina) Ferro | Never played an official match |
| GK | Lourdes Pérez Iturraspe ▼ ^{DISMISSED IN FEBRUARY} | 16 February 2000 (age 26) – Buenos Aires | 0 | | (Argentina) SIC | Never played an official match |
| DF | Valentina Costa Biondi ▼ ^{DISMISSED IN JUNE} | 13 September 1995 (age 31) — (Buenos Aires Province) Bahía Blanca | 95 | 9 | (Australia) Canberra Chill | 13 December 2025, v. Germany |
| DF | Emilia Forcherio | 16 February 1995 (age 31) — Buenos Aires | 34 | 5 | (Argentina) Lomas | 22 June 2025, v. China |
| DF | Agustina Capobianco | 11 August 1999 (age 27) – (Buenos Aires Province) La Plata | 0 | 0 | (Argentina) Santa Bárbara | Never played an official match |
| DF | Valentina Ferola ▼ ^{DISMISSED IN AUGUST} | 24 September 2003 (age 23) – Buenos Aires | 3 | 0 | (Argentina) Italiano | Never played an official match |
| DF | Malena Sabéz | 19 December 2003 (age 22) – Mendoza | 0 | 0 | (Argentina) Los Tordos Rugby Club | Never played an official match |
| MF | Stefania Antoniazzi ▼ ^{DISMISSED IN APRIL} | 18 October 1999 (age 27) – (Santa Fe Province) Santa Fe | 12 | 1 | (Argentina) Tristán Suárez | 22 February 2025, v. Belgium |
| MF | Julieta Arcidiácono ▼ ^{DISMISSED IN FEBRUARY} | 6 April 2001 (age 25) – (Buenos Aires Province) Vicente López | 2 | 0 | (Argentina) Banco Provincia | 10 December 2025, v. Germany |
| MF | Candela Esandi ▼ ^{DISMISSED IN APRIL} | 8 August 2001 (age 25) – (Buenos Aires Province) Bahía Blanca | 1 | 0 | (Argentina) San Fernando | 13 December 2025, v. Germany |
| MF | Ariana Arias ▼ ^{DISMISSED IN FEBRUARY} | 5 July 2004 (age 22) – (San Luis Province) Villa de Merlo | 0 | 0 | (Argentina) Banco Nación | Never played an official match |
| MF | Josefina Cannone | 2003 – (Buenos Aires Province) Junín | 0 | 0 | (Argentina) Arquitectura | Never played an official match |
| MF | Sol di Fonzo ▼ ^{DISMISSED IN AUGUST} | 3 July 2006 (age 20) – Buenos Aires | 0 | 0 | (Argentina) San Fernando | Never played an official match |
| MF | Delfina Mussari ▼ ^{DISMISSED IN AUGUST} | 23 May 2007 (age 19) – Buenos Aires | 0 | 0 | (Argentina) Lomas | Never played an official match |
| MF | Sol Olalla ▼ ^{DISMISSED IN JUNE} | 16 January 2005 (age 21) – Buenos Aires | 0 | 0 | (Argentina) Italiano | Never played an official match |
| MF | Bárbara Raposo ▼ ^{DISMISSED IN AUGUST} | 9 May 2007 (age 19) — Salta | 0 | 0 | (Argentina) Popeye Béisbol Club | Never played an official match |
| MF | Brisa Ruggeri ▼ ^{DISMISSED IN AUGUST} | 12 May 2003 (age 23) – Buenos Aires | 0 | 0 | (Argentina) St. Catherine's | Never played an official match |
| FW | Agustina Albertario | 1 January 1993 (age 33) — (Buenos Aires Province) Adrogué | 238 | 117 | (Argentina) Lomas | 23 February 2025, v. Australia |
| FW | Celina di Santo | 23 February 2000 (age 26) – Buenos Aires | 26 | 3 | (Argentina) Lomas | 26 May 2024, v. India |
| FW | Daiana Pacheco ▼ ^{DISMISSED IN SEPTEMBER} | 4 April 2002 (age 24) – Córdoba | 11 | 2 | (Argentina) Urú Curé | 22 September 2026, v. Chile |
| FW | Victoria Manuele | 4 May 2001 (age 25) – (Buenos Aires Province) La Plata | 9 | 1 | (Argentina) Santa Bárbara | 1 July 2024, v. Australia |
| FW | Emilia Larsen ▼ ^{DISMISSED IN AUGUST} | 12 April 2002 (age 24) – (Buenos Aires Province) Monte Hermoso | 6 | 1 | (Argentina) Monte Hermoso | 14 December 2025, v. Netherlands |
| FW | Catalina Alimenti ▼ ^{DISMISSED IN FEBRUARY} | 30 December 2002 (age 23) – (Buenos Aires Province) Coronel Suárez | 3 | 0 | (Argentina) GEBA | 13 December 2025, v. Germany |
| FW | Aylín Ovejero ▼ ^{DISMISSED IN FEBRUARY} | 23 July 2003 (age 23) – Buenos Aires | 2 | 0 | (Argentina) Lomas | 13 December 2025, v. Germany |
| FW | Luciana Peralta ▼ ^{DISMISSED IN AUGUST} | 19 July 2008 (age 18) – Mendoza | 0 | 0 | (Argentina) Los Tordos Rugby Club | Never played an official match |
| FW | Manuela Raimondo ▼ ^{DISMISSED IN AUGUST} | 28 July 2006 (age 20) — Salta | 0 | 0 | (Argentina) GEBA | Never played an official match |
| FW | Catalina Stamati ▼ ^{DISMISSED IN AUGUST} | 25 January 2006 (age 20) – Buenos Aires | 0 | 0 | (Argentina) GEBA | Never played an official match |

== Annual results ==
2018

Belgium test series

| 25 January 2018 Test Match | Argentina | 5–2 | Belgium | Buenos Aires, Argentina |
| | Granatto; Cavallero; F. Habif; Merino; Trinchinetti | | Peters; Ikegwuonu |

| 27 January 2018 Test Match | Argentina | 3–3 | Belgium | Buenos Aires, Argentina |
| | Granatto; F. Habif; Granatto | | Vanden Borre; Weyns; Leclef |

| 28 January 2018 Test Match | Argentina | 6–2 | Belgium | Buenos Aires, Argentina |
| | Granatto; Merino; Merino; Sánchez Moccia; Cavallero; Albertario | | Vanden Borre; Leclef |

| 31 January 2018 Test Match | Argentina | 2–2 | Belgium | Buenos Aires, Argentina |
| | Campoy; Cavallero | | Strujik; Vanden Borre |

| 2 February 2018 Test Match | Argentina | 2–2 | Belgium | Buenos Aires, Argentina |
| | Campoy; Jardel | | Boon; Versavel |

| 3 February 2018 Test Match | Argentina | 3–0 | Belgium | Buenos Aires, Argentina |
| | Barrionuevo; Barrionuevo; Mi. Fernández Ladra |

Great Britain test series

| 10 February 2018 Test Match | Argentina | 2–1 | Great Britain | Rosario, Argentina |
| | Campoy; Trinchinetti | | Townsend |

| 11 February 2018 Test Match | Argentina | 3–1 | Great Britain | Rosario, Argentina |
| | Merino; Granatto; Jankunas | | Rayer |

| 14 February 2018 Test Match | Argentina | 5–2 | Great Britain | Rosario, Argentina |
| | Granatto; Granatto; Donati; Mi. Fernández Ladra; Donati | | Danson; Ansley |

| 16 February 2018 Test Match | Argentina | 2–4 | Great Britain | Rosario, Argentina |
| | Campoy; Barrionuevo | | Danson; Ansley; Unsworth; Danson |

| 17 February 2018 Test Match | Argentina | 1–0 | Great Britain | Rosario, Argentina |
| | Trinchinetti |

New Zealand test series

| 20 February 2018 Test Match | Argentina | 4–0 | New Zealand | Buenos Aires, Argentina |
| | Granatto; Merino; Jankunas; Barrionuevo |

| 22 February 2018 Test Match | Argentina | 3–1 | New Zealand | Buenos Aires, Argentina |
| | Trinchinetti; Jardel; Jankunas | | McLaren |

| 24 February 2018 Test Match | Argentina | 2–3 | New Zealand | Buenos Aires, Argentina |
| | Jankunas; Jardel | | Gloyn; Gloyn; McLaren |

| 25 February 2018 Test Match | Argentina | 5–0 | New Zealand | Buenos Aires, Argentina |
| | Sánchez Moccia; Ma. Fernández Ladra; Jankunas; Toccalino; Merino |

| 27 February 2018 Test Match | Argentina | 2–1 | New Zealand | Buenos Aires, Argentina |
| | Cavallero; Ma. Fernández Ladra | | Smith |

South American Games

| 30 May 2018 Group Stage | Argentina | 21–0 | Peru | Cochabamba, Bolivia |
| 13:00 | Campoy 1', 8', 11', 16', 53', 57'; Jardel 15', 30'; Alonso 19'; Mi. Fernández Ladra 24', 30', 45', 54'; Albertario 34', 34', 48'; Gorzelany 49'; Jankunas 50', 54', 59'; Toccalino 59' | Report |

| 1 June 2018 Group Stage | Brazil | 0–13 | Argentina | Cochabamba, Bolivia |
| 13:00 | | Report | Gorzelany 2', 54'; Mi. Fernández Ladra 11', 24'; Jankunas 14', 22'; Campoy 30'; Jardel 30', 39'; Toccalino 38', 48'; Sauze 49'; Dichiara 60' |

| 5 June 2018 Semifinal | Argentina | 2–0 | Chile | Cochabamba, Bolivia |
| 13:00 | Jardel 53'; Toccalino 56' | Report |

| 7 June 2018 Final | Argentina | 8–0 | Uruguay | Cochabamba, Bolivia |
| 15:30 | Campoy 7'; Gorzelany 11', 18'; Albertario 15', 55'; Mi. Fernández Ladra 30'; Jankunas 57', 58' | Report |

United States test series

| 11 June 2018 Test Match | Argentina | 5–1 | United States | Tucumán, Argentina |
| | Jankunas; Merino; Gomes Fantasia; Jankunas; Jankunas | | Matson |

| 12 June 2018 Test Match | Argentina | 3–1 | United States | Tucumán, Argentina |
| | A. Habif von der Heyde von der Heyde | | Matson |

| 14 June 2018 Test Match | Argentina | 4–0 | United States | Tucumán, Argentina |
| | Merino; Barrionuevo; Granatto; Granatto |

| 16 June 2018 Test Match | Argentina | 2–1 | United States | Tucumán, Argentina |
| | Merino; Jankunas | | Witmer |

| 17 June 2018 Test Match | Argentina | 3–1 | United States | Tucumán, Argentina |
| | Granatto; Jankunas; Cavallero | | Matson |

Real 4 Nations Cup

| 11 July 2018 Round-Robin | Germany | 1–2 | Argentina | Grünwald, Germany |
| 18:00 | Albertario; Barrionuevo | Report | Schröder |

| 12 July 2018 Round-Robin | Netherlands | 2–1 | Argentina | Grünwald, Germany |
| 17:30 | Merino | Report | de Waard; Matla |

| 14 July 2018 Round-Robin | Argentina | 3–2 | New Zealand | Grünwald, Germany |
| | Cavallero; Merino; Barrionuevo | Report | Doar; McLaren |

China test match (off the record)

| 17 July 2018 Test Match | Argentina | 2–0 | China | London, England |
| | Merino; Jankunas |

London World Cup

| 22 July 2018 Group Stage | Argentina | 6–2 | Spain | London, England |
| | Jankunas 8'; Ortiz 15', 28'; Albertario 22'; Merino 31'; Barrionuevo 48' | Report | Salvatella 3'; Pérez 49' |

| 25 July 2018 Group Stage | Germany | 3–2 | Argentina | London, England |
| | Gablac 6'; Stapenhorst 20', 25' | Report | F. Habif 15'; Ortiz 30' |

| 28 July 2018 Group Stage | Argentina | 1–1 | South Africa | London, England |
| | Granatto 46' | Report | Mayne 30' |

| 30 July 2018 Crossover | Argentina | 2–0 | New Zealand | London, England |
| | Barrionuevo 25'; Merino 49' | Report |

| 1 August 2018 Quarterfinals | Australia | 0–0 (4–3 p) | Argentina | London, England |
| | | Report |
| | Penalties |
| | Peris (penalty shoot-out missed); Bates (penalty shoot-out scored); Fitzpatrick (penalty shoot-out missed); Malone (penalty shoot-out scored); McMahon (penalty shoot-out scored); Bates (penalty shoot-out missed); Peris (penalty shoot-out scored) | | (penalty shoot-out missed) Merino; (penalty shoot-out scored) Von der Heyde; (penalty shoot-out scored) Albertario; (penalty shoot-out scored) Gomes Fantasia; (penalty shoot-out missed) Ma. Fernández Ladra; (penalty shoot-out missed) Albertario; (penalty shoot-out missed) Merino |

Changzhou Champions Trophy

| 17 November 2018 Round-Robin | Australia | 2–1 | Argentina | Changzhou, China |
| | Malone 12', 15' | Report | Granatto 33' |

| 18 November 2018 Round-Robin | Netherlands | 3–0 | Argentina | Changzhou, China |
| | Van Maasakker 27', 48'; Jansen 45' | Report |

| 20 November 2018 Round-Robin | Argentina | 0–2 | China | Changzhou, China |
| | | Report | Zhang J. 13'; Li 28' |

| 22 November 2018 Round-Robin | Argentina | 4–0 | Japan | Changzhou, China |
| | Trinchinetti 19'; Jankunas 21', 48'; Gorzelany 41' | Report |

| 24 November 2018 Round-Robin | Great Britain | 0–1 | Argentina | Changzhou, China |
| | | | Sauze 2' |

| 25 November 2018 Bronze Medal match | Argentina | 6–0 | China | Changzhou, China |
| | Merino 1'; Granatto 5', 16'; Jankunas 44'; Toccalino 48'; Cavallero 57' |

2018 goalscoring Table

| Player | Goals |
|---|---|
| Julieta Jankunas | 22 |
| María José Granatto | 15 |
| Delfina Merino | 15 |
| Pilar Campoy | 12 |
| Noel Barrionuevo | 9 |
| Milagros Fernández Ladra | 9 |
| Agustina Albertario | 8 |
| Priscila Jardel | 8 |
| Martina Cavallero | 7 |
| Agustina Gorzelany | 6 |
| Sofía Toccalino | 6 |
| Eugenia Trinchinetti | 5 |
| Florencia Habif | 3 |
| Paula Ortiz | 3 |
| Bianca Donati | 2 |
| Magdalena Fernández Ladra | 2 |
| Rocío Sánchez Moccia | 2 |
| Victoria Sauze | 2 |
| Lucina von der Heyde | 2 |
| Agostina Alonso | 1 |
| Bárbara Dichiara | 1 |
| Julia Gomes Fantasia | 1 |
| Agustina Habif | 1 |

2019

Italy Test Match (off the record)

| 16 January 2019 Test Match | Argentina | 1–1 | Italy | Buenos Aires, Argentina |
| | Rebecchi | | Vercelli |

Pro League

| 26 January 2019 Round-Robin | Argentina | 2–0 | Belgium | Córdoba, Argentina |
| | Jankunas 12'; A. Habif 42' | Report |

| 2 February 2019 Round-Robin | Argentina | 2–2 (3–1 p) | United States | Córdoba, Argentina |
| | Rebecchi 46'; Merino 50' | Report | Allessie 14'; Moyer 24' |
| | Penalties |
| | Merino (penalty shoot-out scored); D'Elía (penalty shoot-out scored); Rebecchi (penalty shoot-out missed); Von der Heyde (penalty shoot-out scored) | | (penalty shoot-out scored) Sharkey; (penalty shoot-out missed) Gonzales; (penalty shoot-out missed) Manley; (penalty shoot-out missed) Woods |

| 22 February 2019 Round-Robin | Argentina | 2–2 (4–3 p) | Germany | Buenos Aires, Argentina |
| | Merino 3'; Luchetti 43' | Report | Grote 37'; Müller-Wieland 39' |
| | Penalties |
| | Merino (penalty shoot-out missed); D'Elía (penalty shoot-out missed); Von der Heyde (penalty shoot-out scored); Rebecchi (penalty shoot-out scored); Albertario (penalty shoot-out scored); Von der Heyde (penalty shoot-out missed); Rebecchi (penalty shoot-out scored) | | (penalty shoot-out scored) Lorenz; (penalty shoot-out scored) Hauke; (penalty shoot-out missed) Vivot; (penalty shoot-out scored) Gräve; (penalty shoot-out missed) Müller-Wieland; (penalty shoot-out missed) Lorenz; (penalty shoot-out missed) Hauke |

| 24 February 2019 Round-Robin | Argentina | 1–2 | Netherlands | Buenos Aires, Argentina |
| | D'Elía 14' | Report | Matla 17'; Sanders 34' |

| 10 March 2019 Round-Robin | New Zealand | 0–3 | Argentina | Auckland, New Zealand |
| | | Report | Albertario 14'; Retegui 23'; Luchetti 47' |

| 16 March 2019 Round-Robin | Australia | 0–1 | Argentina | Sydney, Australia |
| | | Report | Merino 24' |

| 21 March 2019 Round-Robin | China | 0–1 | Argentina | Changzhou, China |
| | | Report | Albertario 10' |

| 31 March 2019 Round-Robin | Argentina | 1–0 | China | Rosario, Argentina |
| | D'Elía 37' | Report |

| 6 April 2019 Round-Robin | Argentina | 4–2 | Great Britain | Rosario, Argentina |
| | Jankunas 26', 31'; Zuloaga 34'; M. Granatto 56' | Report | Balsdon 28'; Jones 57' |

| 14 April 2019 Round-Robin | Argentina | 3–1 | New Zealand | Rosario, Argentina |
| | Alonso 29'; Jankunas 48'; Trinchinetti 52' | Report | Michelsen 26' |

| 4 May 2019 Round-Robin | Argentina | 1–1 (3–1 p) | Australia | Buenos Aires, Argentina |
| | D'Elía 18' | Report | M. Fitzpatrick 2' |
| | Penalties |
| | D'Elía (penalty shoot-out scored); Von der Heyde (penalty shoot-out missed); Alonso (penalty shoot-out missed); Rebecchi (penalty shoot-out scored); Jankunas (penalty shoot-out scored) | | (penalty shoot-out missed) Bone; (penalty shoot-out scored) Bates; (penalty shoot-out missed) Peris; (penalty shoot-out missed) Nobbs |

| 12 May 2019 Round-Robin | United States | 0–4 | Argentina | Lancaster, United States |
| | | Report | Albertario 21'; Rebecchi 37'; V. Granatto 52', 53' |

| 18 May 2019 Round-Robin | Great Britain | 1–1 (1–2 p) | Argentina | London, England |
| | Owsley 56' | Report | Albertario 52' |
| | Penalties |
| | Toman (penalty shoot-out missed); Martin (penalty shoot-out missed); Webb (penalty shoot-out scored); Jones (penalty shoot-out missed); Evans (penalty shoot-out missed) | | (penalty shoot-out scored) D'Elía; (penalty shoot-out missed) Albertario; (penalty shoot-out missed) Alonso; (penalty shoot-out missed) Rebecchi; (penalty shoot-out scored) Jankunas |

| 22 May 2019 Round-Robin | Germany | 1–2 | Argentina | Krefeld, Germany |
| | Stapenhorst 33' | Report | Costa Biondi 55'; D'Elía 60' |

| 20 June 2019 Round-Robin | Netherlands | 2–1 | Argentina | Utrecht, Netherlands |
| | Welten 24'; Matla 26' | Report | Retegui 22' |

| 23 June 2019 Round-Robin | Belgium | 1–2 | Argentina | Antwerp, Belgium |
| | Vanden Borre 60' | Report | Retegui 17'; M. Granatto 23' |

| 27 June 2019 Semifinal | Argentina | 1–1 (3–4 p) | Australia | Amstelveen, Netherlands |
| | Jankunas 4' | Report | Kenny 29' |
| | Penalties |
| | Rebecchi (penalty shoot-out missed); D'Elía (penalty shoot-out scored); Albertario (penalty shoot-out scored); Jankunas (penalty shoot-out scored); Di Santo (penalty shoot-out missed); D'Elía (penalty shoot-out missed) | | (penalty shoot-out scored) Malone; (penalty shoot-out scored) Nobbs; (penalty shoot-out missed) Kenny; (penalty shoot-out missed) Peris; (penalty shoot-out scored) Williams; (penalty shoot-out scored) Malone |

| 29 June 2019 Bronze Medal Match | Germany | 1–1 (3–1 p) | Argentina | Amstelveen, Netherlands |
| | Schröder 32' | Report | Retegui 6' |
| | Penalties |
| | Schröder (penalty shoot-out missed); Gräve (penalty shoot-out missed); Müller-Wieland (penalty shoot-out scored); Maertens (penalty shoot-out scored); Huse (penalty shoot-out scored) | | (penalty shoot-out missed) Albertario; (penalty shoot-out missed) Habif; (penalty shoot-out scored) Rebecchi; (penalty shoot-out missed) Von der Heyde |

Pan American Games

| 29 July 2019 Group Stage | Argentina | 2–0 | Uruguay | Lima, Peru |
| | Rebecchi 7'; D'Elía 47' | Report |

| 31 July 2019 Group Stage | Canada | 0–3 | Argentina | Lima, Peru |
| | | Report | D'Elía 5'; Rebecchi 34'; Barrionuevo 56' |

| 2 August 2019 Group Stage | Argentina | 13–1 | Cuba | Lima, Peru |
| | M. Granatto 2'; V. Granatto 9'; Barrionuevo 9', 21', 56', 59'; Jankunas 13', 27', 39'; Rebecchi 24', 43', 49'; Luchetti 28' | Report | Milanes 22' |

| 4 August 2019 Quarterfinal | Argentina | 21–0 | Peru | Lima, Peru |
| | M. Granatto 3', 18', 26'; Jankunas 10', 32', 45', 55'; Costa 14'; Luchetti 18', 60'; Albertario 23', 30', 43'; Alonso 25', 35'; V. Granatto 29', 49', 56'; Retegui 33'; D'Elía 45'; Trinchinetti 47' | Report |

| 6 August 2019 Semifinal | Argentina | 3–1 | Chile | Lima, Peru |
| | Rebecchi 3'; Jankunas 44', 60' | Report | Krimerman 45' |

| 9 August 2019 Final | Argentina | 5–1 | Canada | Lima, Peru |
| | Jankunas 9', 47'; D'Elía 22', 45'; Rebecchi 37' | Report | Wright 32' |

Spain test series (off the record)

| 9 October 2019 Test Match | Spain | 0–2 | Argentina | Valencia, Spain |
| | | | Barrionuevo; Jankunas |

| 10 October 2019 Test Match | Spain | 0–1 | Argentina | Valencia, Spain |
| | | | Albertario |

| 12 October 2019 Test Match | Spain | 0–2 | Argentina | Valencia, Spain |
| | | | M. Granatto; Rübenacker |

| 13 October 2019 Test Match | Spain | 2–0 | Argentina | Valencia, Spain |
| | Ycart; García |

| 15 October 2019 Test Match | Spain | 0–2 | Argentina | Valencia, Spain |
| | | | Barrionuevo; Jankunas |

Italy test series (off the record)

| 17 October 2019 Test Match | Italy | 0–4 | Argentina | Rome, Italy |
| | | | D'Elía; M. Granatto; Rübenacker; Barrionuevo |

| 18 October 2019 Test Match | Italy | 1–5 | Argentina | Rome, Italy |
| | | | Alonso; Costa Biondi; Luchetti; Albertario; Bruggesser |

| 20 October 2019 Test Match | Italy | 2–3 | Argentina | Rome, Italy |
| | | | M. Granatto; Luchetti; Retegui |

Germany test series

| 1 December 2019 Test Match | Argentina | 3–1 | Germany | La Plata, Argentina |
| | Rebecchi 14'; Gorzelany 34'; M. Granatto 55' | Report | Heyn 16' |

| 4 December 2019 Test Match | Argentina | 1–1 | Germany | La Plata, Argentina |
| | Rebecchi 30' | Report | Maertens 54' |

| 5 December 2019 Test Match | Argentina | 1–0 | Germany | La Plata, Argentina |
| | D'Elía 39' | Report |

| 8 December 2019 Unofficial Test Match | Argentina | 3–1 | Germany | Buenos Aires, Argentina |
| | Albertario |

2019 goalscoring table

| Player | Goals |
|---|---|
| Julieta Jankunas | 16 |
| Carla Rebecchi | 11 |
| María José Granatto | 10 |
| Agustina Albertario | 9 |
| Silvina D'Elía | 9 |
| Noel Barrionuevo | 8 |
| Rosario Luchetti | 7 |
| Victoria Granatto | 6 |
| Micaela Retegui | 6 |
| Agostina Alonso | 4 |
| Valentina Costa Biondi | 3 |
| Delfina Merino | 3 |
| Josefina Rübenacker | 2 |
| Eugenia Trinchinetti | 2 |
| Brisa Bruggesser | 1 |
| Agustina Gorzelany | 1 |
| Agustina Habif | 1 |
| Victoria Zuloaga | 1 |

2020

Test Matches Serie

| 25 January 2020 Test Match | Argentina | 2–1 | Spain | Mar del Plata, Argentina |
| | Albertario 34'; M. Granatto 44' | Report | Riera 5' |

| 26 January 2020 Test Match | Argentina | 0–3 | Spain | Mar del Plata, Argentina |
| | | Report | Jimenez 17'; Iglesias 19'; García Grau 43' |

| 28 January 2020 Test Match | Argentina | 3–1 | Spain | Mar del Plata, Argentina |
| | M. Granatto 19'; Barrionuevo 20', 57' | Report | Iglesias 33' |

| 29 January 2020 Test Match | Argentina | 5–3 | Spain | Mar del Plata, Argentina |
| | Albertario 4'; Sánchez Moccia 8'; D'Elía 24'; M. Granatto 45'; Barrionuevo 56' | Report | Segu 14'; López 36'; Salvatella 58' |

| 1 February 2020 Test Match | Argentina | 3–1 | Japan | Mar del Plata, Argentina |
| | Merino 15'; Albertario 31'; Gorzelany 43' | Report | Shimizu 46' |

| 2 February 2020 Test Match | Argentina | 3–2 | Japan | Mar del Plata, Argentina |
| | Rebecchi 41'; Cerundolo 56'; Gorzelany 59' | Report | Y. Nagai 41'; H. Nagai 45' |

| 4 February 2020 Test Match | Argentina | 6–1 | Japan | Mar del Plata, Argentina |
| | Merino 5'; Rebecchi 33'; Jankunas 34'; M. Granatto 45'; Gorzelany 52'; Barrionuevo 57' | Report | Y. Nagai 12' |

Pro League

| 7 February 2020 Round-Robin | Argentina | 6–2 | United States | Buenos Aires, Argentina |
| | Jankunas 3'; Merino 23'; Gorzelany 33'; Luchetti 37'; Sánchez Moccia 57'; Rebecchi 60' | Report | Hoffman 24'; West 50' |

| 8 February 2020 Round-Robin | Argentina | 6–1 | United States | Buenos Aires, Argentina |
| | Gorzelany 1'; Merino 8', 60'; Rebecchi 13'; Barrionuevo 40', 53' | Report | West 28' |

| 15 February 2020 Round-Robin | Argentina | 2–0 | Netherlands | Buenos Aires, Argentina |
| | Gorzelany 35'; Merino 57' | Report |

| 16 February 2020 Round-Robin | Argentina | 1–3 | Netherlands | Buenos Aires, Argentina |
| | Gorzelany 18' | Report | Matla 30+'; Jansen 42'; Fortuin 60' |

| 28 February 2020 Round-Robin | New Zealand | 1–1 (1–3 p) | Argentina | Christchurch, New Zealand |
| | Ralph 19' | Report | Albertario 37' |
| | Penalties |
| | Shannon (penalty shoot-out missed); Charlton (penalty shoot-out scored); Merry (penalty shoot-out missed); Ralph (penalty shoot-out missed) | | (penalty shoot-out scored) Jankunas; (penalty shoot-out scored) Miranda; (penalty shoot-out missed) Albertario; (penalty shoot-out missed) M. Granatto; (penalty shoot-out scored) Jardel |

| 1 March 2020 Round-Robin | New Zealand | 5–3 | Argentina | Christchurch, New Zealand |
| | Merry 3', 11', 13', 54'; Ralph 47' | Report | M. Granatto 26', 31'; Gorzelany 48' |

| 6 March 2020 Round-Robin | Australia | 0–2 | Argentina | Perth, Australia |
| | | Report | Jankunas 14'; Gorzelany 48' |

| 7 March 2020 Round-Robin | Australia | 0–2 | Argentina | Perth, Australia |
| | | Report | V. Granatto 25'; Toccalino 59' |

2020 goalscoring Table

| Player | Goals |
|---|---|
| Agustina Gorzelany | 9 |
| Noel Barrionuevo | 6 |
| María José Granatto | 6 |
| Delfina Merino | 6 |
| Agustina Albertario | 4 |
| Carla Rebecchi | 4 |
| Julieta Jankunas | 3 |
| Rocío Sánchez Moccia | 2 |
| Constanza Cerundolo | 1 |
| Silvina D'Elía | 1 |
| Victoria Granatto | 1 |
| Rosario Luchetti | 1 |
| Sofía Toccalino | 1 |

2021

Practice Matches Serie

| 22 January 2021 Practice Match | Argentina | 2 - 1 | India | Buenos Aires, Argentina |
| | Pagella 10'; Gorzelany 58' | | Grace 54' |

| 24 January 2021 Practice Match | Argentina | 3 - 2 | India | Buenos Aires, Argentina |
| | Pagella 25'; Cerundolo 37'; Gorzelany 40' | | Tete 6'; Gurjit 45' |

| 26 January 2021 Practice Match | Argentina | 3 - 2 | India | Buenos Aires, Argentina |
| | Retegui 25'; Gorzelany 50'; Granatto M. 56' | | Sharmila 30'; Gurjit 39' |

| 28 January 2021 Practice Match | Argentina | 2 - 0 | India | Buenos Aires, Argentina |
| | D'Elía 2'; Albertario 54' |

| 30 January 2021 Practice Match | Argentina | Cancelled | India | Buenos Aires, Argentina |

| 31 January 2021 Practice Match | Argentina | 1 - 1 | India | Buenos Aires, Argentina |
| | Forcherio | | Rani |

Pro League

| 3 April 2021 Round-Robin | Argentina | 0 - 0 (3–2 p) | Germany | Buenos Aires, Argentina |
| | | Report |
| | Penalties |
| | Forcherio (penalty shoot-out scored); Albertario (penalty shoot-out scored); V. Granatto (penalty shoot-out missed); Jankunas (penalty shoot-out missed); Merino (penalty shoot-out scored) | | (penalty shoot-out missed) Zimmermann; (penalty shoot-out missed) Oruz; (penalty shoot-out missed) Lorenz; (penalty shoot-out scored) Pieper; (penalty shoot-out scored) Maertens |

| 4 April 2021 Round-Robin | Argentina | 1 - 3 | Germany | Buenos Aires, Argentina |
| | Gorzelany 51' | Report | Stapenhorst 3'; Heinz 24'; Maertens 31' |

| 10 April 2021 Round-Robin | Argentina | Cancelled | China | Buenos Aires, Argentina |

| 11 April 2021 Round-Robin | Argentina | Cancelled | China | Buenos Aires, Argentina |

| 15 May 2021 Round-Robin | Great Britain | Cancelled | Argentina | London, England |

| 16 May 2021 Round-Robin | Great Britain | Cancelled | Argentina | London, England |

| 22 May 2021 Round-Robin | Belgium | Cancelled | Argentina | Antwerp, Belgium |

| 23 May 2021 Round-Robin | Belgium | Cancelled | Argentina | Antwerp, Belgium |

Test Matches

| May 2021 Test Match | Argentina | Cancelled | Italy |

| May 2021 Test Match | Argentina | Cancelled | Japan |

| May 2021 Test Match | Argentina | Cancelled | Ireland |

Pre-Olympic Practice Matches

| 3 July 2021 Practice Match | Argentina | 2 - 2 | Germany | Valencia, Spain |
| | Gorzelany; Granatto M. | | No Data |

| 4 July 2021 Practice Match | Spain | 3 - 3 | Argentina | Valencia, Spain |
| | No Data | | Albertario; Gorzelany; Trinchinetti |

| 6 July 2021 Practice Match | Argentina | 2 - 2 | Germany | Valencia, Spain |
| | Gorzelany; Jankunas | | No Data |

| 7 July 2021 Practice Match | Spain | 2 - 5 | Argentina | Valencia, Spain |
| | No Data | | Albertario; Granatto V. Alonso; Merino; Granatto M. |

| 14 July 2021 Practice Match | Japan | 2 - 2 | Argentina | Sakai, Japan |
| | No Data | | Granatto M. Gorzelany |

| 16 July 2021 Practice Match | Japan | 2 - 3 | Argentina | Sakai, Japan |
| | No Data | | Jankunas; Granatto M. x2 |

| 19 July 2021 Practice Match | Argentina | 1 - 1 | Ireland | Tokyo, Japan |
| | Granatto M. | | No Data |

| 20 July 2021 Practice Match | Argentina | 1 - 1 | Germany | Tokyo, Japan |
| | No Data | | No Data |

| 21 July 2021 Practice Match | Argentina | 1 - 0 | India | Tokyo, Japan |
| | No Data | | No Data |

Olympic Games

| 25 July 2021 Group Stage | New Zealand | 3 - 0 | Argentina | Tokyo, Japan |
| | Smith 35'; Ralph 40'; Pearson 54' | Report |

| 26 July 2021 Group Stage | Argentina | 3 - 0 | Spain | Tokyo, Japan |
| | Raposo 47'; Albertario 57'; Barrionuevo 59' | Report |

| 28 July 2021 Group Stage | Argentina | 3 - 2 | China | Tokyo, Japan |
| | Gorzelany 18', 24'; Jankunas 54' | Report | Li H. 52'; Liu 56' |

| 29 July 2021 Group Stage | Japan | 1 - 2 | Argentina | Tokyo, Japan |
| | Mori 19' | Report | Gorzelany 10'; M. Granatto 45' |

| 31 July 2021 Group Stage | Argentina | 0 - 2 | Australia | Tokyo, Japan |
| | | Report | S. Fitzpatrick 49'; Chalker 59' |

| 2 August 2021 Quarter Finals | Germany | 0 - 3 | Argentina | Tokyo, Japan |
| | | Report | Albertario 27'; Granatto V. 29'; Raposo 52' |

| 4 August 2021 Semi-Finals | Argentina | 2 - 1 | India | Tokyo, Japan |
| | Barrionuevo 18', 37' | Report | Gurjit 2' |

| 6 August 2021 Gold Medal match | Netherlands | 3 - 1 | Argentina | Tokyo, Japan |
| | Matla 23'; Van Maasakker 26', 29' | Report | Gorzelany 30+' |

2021 goalscoring Table

| Player | FG | PC | PS | Total |
|---|---|---|---|---|
| Agustina Gorzelany | | 5 | | 5 |
| Noel Barrionuevo | | 2 | 1 | 3 |
| Agustina Albertario | 2 | | | 2 |
| Valentina Raposo | | 2 | | 2 |
| María José Granatto | 1 | | | 1 |
| Victoria Granatto | | 1 | | 1 |
| Julieta Jankunas | 1 | | | 1 |
| OVERALL | 4 | 9 | 1 | 14 |

- Goals at unofficial matches in italics
2022

Pan American Cup

| 19 January 2022 Pool A | Argentina | 6 - 0 | Uruguay | Santiago, Chile |
| | Gorzelany 2', 45'; Retegui 9'; Albertario 30'; Thome 35' di Santo 42' | Report |

| 21 January 2022 Pool A | Chile | 0 - 4 | Argentina | Santiago, Chile |
| | | Report | 27' Alonso; 35', 59' M. Granatto; 43' Gorzelany |

| 27 January 2022 Semifinals | Argentina | 3 - 0 | Canada | Santiago, Chile |
| | Trinchinetti 32'; Cedrés 52', 56' | Report |

| 29 January 2022 Final | Argentina | 4 - 2 | Chile | Santiago, Chile |
| | M. Granatto 15', 57'; Albertario 39'; Gorzelany 53' | Report | Krimerman Losada 34', 48' |

Pro League

| 12 February 2022 Round-Robin | Argentina | 3 - 1 | Belgium | Buenos Aires, Argentina |
| | Trinchinetti 10', 58'; M. Granatto 55' | Report | Gerniers 12' |

| 13 February 2022 Round-Robin | Argentina | 3 - 1 | Belgium | Buenos Aires, Argentina |
| | Gorzelany 37', 43', 59' | Report | Breyne 11' |

| 19 February 2022 Round-Robin | Argentina | 5 - 2 | England | Buenos Aires, Argentina |
| | Gorzelany 5', 39'; Jankunas 13', 55'; Thome 37' | Report | Pearne-Webb 23'; Rayer 38' |

| 20 February 2022 Round-Robin | Argentina | 5 - 2 | England | Buenos Aires, Argentina |
| | M. Granatto 5'; Triñanes 26'; Trinchinetti 28'; V. Granatto 35'; Albertarrio 49' | Report | Rayer 48'; Hunt 52' |

| 16 April 2022 Round-Robin | Argentina | 3 - 1 | United States | Buenos Aires, Argentina |
| | Costa 34', 60'; Sanchez 35' | Report | Grega 30' |

| 17 April 2022 Round-Robin | Argentina | 3 - 0 | United States | Buenos Aires, Argentina |
| | V. Granatto 18', 34'; Sánchez Moccia 46' | Report |

| 14 May 2022 Round-Robin | Spain | 0 – 1 | Argentina | Terrassa, Spain |
| | | Report | V. Granatto 4' |

| 15 May 2022 Round-Robin | Spain | 0 – 1 | Argentina | Terrassa, Spain |
| | | Report | Albertarrio 31' |

| 17 May 2022 Round-Robin | China | 1 – 3 | Argentina | Terrassa, Spain |
| | Chen 57' | Report | Gorzelany 21'; Albertarrio 43'; V. Granatto 51' |

| 18 May 2022 Round-Robin | China | 1 - 3 | Argentina | Terrassa, Spain |
| | Gu 19' | Report | Jankunas 36'; Gorzelany 52'; Trinchinetti 57' |

| 21 May 2022 Round-Robin | Germany | 1 - 2 | Argentina | Berlin, Germany |
| | Huse 41' | Report | Trinchinetti 22'; Gorzelany 51' |

| 22 May 2022 Round-Robin | Germany | 1 – 3 | Argentina | Berlin, Germany |
| | Lorenz 26' | Report | M. Granatto 1', 33'; Cedrés 11' |

| 28 May 2022 Round-Robin | Netherlands | 1 – 1 (4–2 p) | Argentina | Rotterdam, Netherlands |
| | | Report |
| | Penalties |
| | Matla (penalty shoot-out scored); Jansen (penalty shoot-out scored); Fortuin (penalty shoot-out scored); De Waard (penalty shoot-out scored) | | (penalty shoot-out missed) V. Granatto; (penalty shoot-out scored) Albertario; (penalty shoot-out missed) Thome; (penalty shoot-out scored) Gorzelany |

| 29 May 2022 Round-Robin | Netherlands | 1 – 1 (3–2 p) | Argentina | Rotterdam, Netherlands |
| | Jansen 37' | Report | M. Granatto 43' |
| | Penalties |
| | Sanders (penalty shoot-out scored); Matla (penalty shoot-out missed); Fortuin (penalty shoot-out missed); Jansen (penalty shoot-out scored); De Waard (penalty shoot-out missed); Sanders (penalty shoot-out scored) | | (penalty shoot-out missed) Sánchez Moccia; (penalty shoot-out scored) Albertario; (penalty shoot-out missed) Toccalino; (penalty shoot-out scored) Cedrés; (penalty shoot-out missed) V. Granatto; (penalty shoot-out missed) Albertario |

| 18 June 2022 Round-Robin | India | 3–3 (2–1 p) | Argentina | Rotterdam, Netherlands |
| | Lalremsiami 4'; Gurjit 37', 51' | Report | Gorzelany 22', 37', 45' |
| | Penalties |
| | Sharmila (penalty shoot-out missed); Neha (penalty shoot-out scored); Monika (penalty shoot-out missed); Sonika (penalty shoot-out scored) | | (penalty shoot-out missed) Jankunas; (penalty shoot-out missed) M. Granatto; (penalty shoot-out missed) Sánchez Moccia; (penalty shoot-out scored) V. Granatto; (penalty shoot-out missed) Albertario |

| 19 June 2022 Round-Robin | India | 2–3 | Argentina | Rotterdam, Netherlands |
| | Salima 23'; Grace 48' | Report | Thome 38'; Trinchinetti 41'; Gorzelany 43' |

World Cup

| 2 July 2022 Group C | Argentina | 4–0 | South Korea | Terrassa, Spain |
| | Gorzelany 2', 28'; V. Granatto 21'; Jankunas 39' | Report |

| 3 July 2022 Group C | Spain | 1–4 | Argentina | Terrassa, Spain |
| | García Grau 51' | Report | Gorzelany 39', 44'; Raposo 40'; M. Granatto 60' |

| 7 July 2022 Group C | Argentina | 7–1 | Canada | Terrassa, Spain |
| | Jankunas 10'; V. Granatto 16'; M. Granatto 21'; Albertarrio 32'; Forcherio 48'; Gorzelany 48', 51' | Report | Delmotte 6' |

| 13 July 2022 Quarter-finals | Argentina | 1–0 | England | Terrassa, Spain |
| | V. Granatto 47' | Report |

| 16 July 2022 Semifinals | Germany | 2–2 (2–4 p) | Argentina | Terrassa, Spain |
| | Granitzki 1'; Stapenhorst 45' | Report | Gorzelany 15'; Albertarrio 28' | Stadium: Estadi Olímpic de Terrassa, Terrassa |
| | Penalties |
| | Lorenz (penalty shoot-out missed); Schröder (penalty shoot-out scored); Weidemann (penalty shoot-out missed); Zimmermann (penalty shoot-out scored) | | (penalty shoot-out missed) Jankunas; (penalty shoot-out scored) Albertarrio; (penalty shoot-out scored) Thome; (penalty shoot-out scored) Alonso; (penalty shoot-out scored) Sanchez |

| 17 July 2022 Final | Netherlands | 3–1 | Argentina | Terrassa, Spain |
| | Verschoor 17'; Matla 24'; Albers 36' | Report | Gorzelany 46' |

Unofficial Japan Test Matches

| 27 August 2022 Test match | Japan | 2 - 2 | Argentina | Tokyo, Japan |
| | Unknown | | Pagella 8'; Raposo 20' |

| 28 August 2022 Test match | Japan | 0 - 2 | Argentina | Tokyo, Japan |
| | | | Adorno; Forcherio |

| 2 September 2022 Test match | Japan | 2 - 1 | Argentina | Sakai, Japan |
| | Unknown | | Forcherio |

| 3 September 2022 Test match | Japan | 0 - 2 | Argentina | Sakai, Japan |
| | | | Adorno; Forcherio |

Uruguay Test Matches

| 13 September 2022 Test match | Uruguay | 0 - 5 | Argentina | Montevideo, Uruguay |
| | | | Toccalino x2 Adorno; Delpech; Cerundolo |

| 14 September 2022 Test match | Uruguay | 0 - 2 | Argentina | Montevideo, Uruguay |
| | | | Sanguinetti; Cairó |

South American Games

| 4 October 2022 Round-Robin | Argentina | 13–0 | Paraguay | Luque, Paraguay |
| | Trinchinetti 3', 6'; Adorno 8', 13', 44'; Andrade 11'; Thome 14', 32'; Forcherio 20', 47'; Delpech 34'; Cairó 35', 49' | Report |

| 6 October 2022 Round-Robin | Uruguay | 0–1 | Argentina | Luque, Paraguay |
| | | Report | Trinchinetti 28' |

| 8 October 2022 Round-Robin | Chile | 1–4 | Argentina | Luque, Paraguay |
| | Urroz 1' | Report | Forcherio 4'; Thome 20'; Andrade 38'; Cairó 41' |

| 10 October 2022 Round-Robin | Peru | 0–20 | Argentina | Luque, Paraguay |
| | | Report | Forcherio 6'; Palet 5', 41'; Toccalino 6', 19'; Trinchinetti 12', 20', 34'; Sánchez Moccia 16'; Adorno 24', 28', 39', 42', 55'; Delpech 26'; Thome 43', 45', 51', 58'; Andrade 49' |

| 12 October 2022 Final | Argentina | 0 - 0 (2–3 p) | Chile | Luque, Paraguay |
| | | Report |
| | Penalties |
| | Toccalino (penalty shoot-out missed); Adorno (penalty shoot-out missed); Thome (penalty shoot-out scored); Palet (penalty shoot-out scored); Sánchez Moccia (penalty shoot-out missed); Thome (penalty shoot-out missed) | | (penalty shoot-out missed) Tala; (penalty shoot-out scored) Ananias; (penalty shoot-out scored) Khamis; (penalty shoot-out missed) Jacob; (penalty shoot-out missed) Urroz; (penalty shoot-out scored) Ananias |

Pro League

| 5 November 2022 Round-Robin | Argentina | 4–2 | Germany | Mendoza, Argentina |
| | Granatto 1', 33'; Toccalino 41'; Trinchinetti 55' | Report | Lorenz 4'; Stapenhorst 35' |

| 6 November 2022 Round-Robin | Argentina | 1–0 | Belgium | Mendoza, Argentina |
| | Costa Biondi 28' | Report |

| 8 November 2022 Round-Robin | Argentina | 2–2 (0–3 p) | Germany | Mendoza, Argentina |
| | Jankunas 47', 53' | Report | Stapenhorst 9'; Maertens 55' |
| | Penalties |
| | Fernández Ladra Ma. (penalty shoot-out missed); Andrade (penalty shoot-out missed); Thome (penalty shoot-out missed) | | (penalty shoot-out missed) Strauss; (penalty shoot-out scored) Lorenz; (penalty shoot-out scored) Strauss; (penalty shoot-out scored) Wiedemann |

| 9 November 2022 Round-Robin | Argentina | 2–2 (1–2 p) | Belgium | Mendoza, Argentina |
| | Costa Biondi 29'; Jankunas 44' | Report | Struijk 32'; Ballenghien 47' |
| | Penalties |
| | Von der Heyde (penalty shoot-out missed); Sánchez (penalty shoot-out scored); Granatto (penalty shoot-out missed); Jankunas (penalty shoot-out missed); Albertarrio (penalty shoot-out missed) | | (penalty shoot-out scored) Versavel; (penalty shoot-out missed) Ballenghien; (penalty shoot-out missed) Englebert; (penalty shoot-out scored) Breyne |

| 14 December 2022 Round-Robin | Argentina | 1–3 | Netherlands | Santiago del Estero, Argentina |
| | Gorzelany 29' | Report | Dicke 5'; Burg 9'; Jansen 20' |

| 15 December 2022 Round-Robin | Argentina | 3–0 | Great Britain | Santiago del Estero, Argentina |
| | Gorzelany 31'; Granatto 33'; Campoy 39' | Report |

| 17 December 2022 Round-Robin | Argentina | 0–2 | Netherlands | Santiago del Estero, Argentina |
| | | Report | Moes 31'; Jansen 58' |

| 18 December 2022 Round-Robin | Argentina | 1–0 | Great Britain | Santiago del Estero, Argentina |
| | Jankunas 2' | Report |

2022 goalscoring Table

| Player | FG | PC | PS | Total |
|---|---|---|---|---|
| Agustina Gorzelany | - | 22 | 4 | 26 |
| María José Granatto | 5 | 10 | - | 15 |
| Eugenia Trinchinetti | 8 | 6 | - | 14 |
| Delfina Thome | 7 | 3 | - | 10 |
| Guadalupe Adorno | 2 | 6 | - | 8 |
| Victoria Granatto | 7 | 1 | - | 8 |
| Julieta Jankunas | 7 | 1 | - | 8 |
| Agustina Albertario | 7 | - | - | 7 |
| Emilia Forcherio | - | 5 | - | 5 |
| Valentina Costa Biondi | - | 4 | - | 4 |
| Catalina Andrade | 2 | 1 | - | 3 |
| Sofía Cairó | - | 3 | - | 3 |
| Jimena Cedrés | 3 | - | - | 3 |
| Rocío Sánchez Moccia | 3 | - | - | 3 |
| Inés Delpech | - | 2 | - | 2 |
| Gianella Palet | 2 | - | - | 2 |
| Agostina Alonso | 1 | - | - | 1 |
| Pilar Campoy | 1 | - | - | 1 |
| Celina di Santo | 1 | - | - | 1 |
| Valentina Raposo | - | 1 | - | 1 |
| Micaela Retegui | 1 | - | - | 1 |
| Sofía Toccalino | - | 1 | - | 1 |
| Martina Triñanes | - | 1 | - | 1 |
| OVERALL | 56 | 64 | 3 | 123 |

- Goals at unofficial matches in italics
2023

Ireland test match series

| 9 February 2023 Match #1 | Argentina | 2 - 0 | Ireland | Mar del Plata, Argentina |
| | Toccalino; Adorno |

| 11 February 2023 Match #2 | Argentina | 2 - 1 | Ireland | Mar del Plata, Argentina |
| | Campoy; Gorzelany | | Upton |

| 12 February 2023 Match #3 | Argentina | 3 - 0 | Ireland | Mar del Plata, Argentina |
| | Gorzelany; Jankunas; Albertario |

| 14 February 2023 Match #4 | Argentina | 3 - 0 | Ireland | Mar del Plata, Argentina |
| | Gorzelany; Granatto; Costa Biondi |

Pro League

| 28 February 2023 Round-Robin | Australia | 2–0 | Argentina | Hobart, Australia |
| | Cullum-Sanders 2'; Taylor 18' | Report |

| 2 March 2023 Round-Robin | Argentina | 3–0 | United States | Hobart, Australia |
| | Gorzelany 10'; Cairó 23'; Granatto 45' | Report |

| 3 March 2023 Round-Robin | Australia | 0–1 | Argentina | Hobart, Australia |
| | | Report | von der Heyde 48' |

| 5 March 2023 Round-Robin | United States | 0–3 | Argentina | Hobart, Australia |
| | | Report | Granatto 18', 56'; Thome Gustavino 40' |

Uruguay test match series

| 28 March 2023 Match #1 | Uruguay | 0 – 2 | Argentina | Montevideo, Uruguay |
| | | | Adorno; Thome |

| 29 March 2023 Match #2 | Uruguay | 0 – 3 | Argentina | Montevideo, Uruguay |
| | | | Thome; Fajardo; Toccalino |

Spain test match series

| 2 May 2023 Match #1 | Spain | 1 - 3 | Argentina | Valencia, Spain |
| | no data | | Granatto; Albertario; Sánchez Moccia |

| 3 May 2023 Match #2 | Spain | 1 - 2 | Argentina | Valencia, Spain |
| | no data | | Granatto; Manuele |

Uruguay test match series

| 16 May 2023 Match #1 | Argentina | 4 - 0 | Uruguay | Salta, Argentina |
| | Miranda; Adorno; Adorno; Sanguinetti |

| 17 May 2023 Match #2 | Argentina | 3 - 0 | Uruguay | Salta, Argentina |
| | Piccardo; Cairó; Thome |

Pro League

| 9 June 2023 Round-Robin | Argentina | 2 - 1 | China | Eindhoven, Netherlands |
| | Thome 37'; Raposo 60' | Report | Zhang X. 52' |

| 12 June 2023 Round-Robin | China | 1 - 2 | Argentina | Eindhoven, Netherlands |
| | Zhang Y. 26' | Report | Piccardo 21'; Costa Biondi 58' |

Japan test match

| 14 June 2023 Match | Argentina | 2 – 0 | Japan | Antwerp, Belgium |
| | Jankunas; Costa Biondi |

Pro League

| 17 June 2023 Round-Robin | Argentina | 1 - 2 | New Zealand | Antwerp, Belgium |
| | Costa Biondi 20' | Report | Shannon 11'; Ralph 44' |

| 20 June 2023 Round-Robin | New Zealand | 0 - 4 | Argentina | Antwerp, Belgium |
| | | Report | Alonso 15'; Albertario 42'; Toccalino 50'; Costa Biondi 56' |

National test match series

| 19 September 2023 Match #1 | Argentina | 3 - 0 | Argentina | Monte Hermoso, Argentina |
| | Alonso; Gorzelany; Gorzelany |

| 21 September 2023 Match #2 | Argentina | 0 - 2 | Argentina | Monte Hermoso, Argentina |
| | | | Casas; Pacheco |

South Africa test match series

| 24 September 2023 Match #1 | Argentina | Cancelled | South Africa | Monte Hermoso, Argentina |

| 25 September 2023 Match #2 | Argentina | Cancelled | South Africa | Monte Hermoso, Argentina |

| 27 September 2023 Match #3 | Argentina | Cancelled | South Africa | Monte Hermoso, Argentina |

| 28 September 2023 Match #4 | Argentina | Cancelled | South Africa | Monte Hermoso, Argentina |

Pan American Games

| 26 October 2023 Pool A | Argentina | 8 - 1 | Uruguay | Santiago, Chile |
| | Gorzelany 8', 15'; Jankunas 27', 43'; Granatto 29', 32'; Thome 35'; Trinchinetti 55' | Report |

| 28 October 2023 Pool A | United States | 1 - 5 | Argentina | Santiago, Chile |
| | Grega 9' | Report | Granatto 13', 44'; Thome 22'; Gorzelany 50', 60' |

| 30 October 2023 Pool A | Argentina | 21 – 0 | Trinidad and Tobago | Santiago, Chile |
| | Campoy 9'; Cairó 12', 50'; Trinchinetti 17', 32'; Gorzelany 22', 23', 24', 36', 43', 58'; Raposo 27', 49'; Sauze 28'; Granatto 33', 40', 42'; Thome 40', 54'; Jankunas 43', 55' | Report |

| 2 November 2023 Semifinal | Argentina | 3 – 0 | Canada | Santiago, Chile |
| | Thome 26'; Jankunas 28'; Raposo 44' | Report |

| 4 November 2023 Bronze/Final | Argentina | 2 – 1 | United States | Santiago, Chile |
| | Gorzelany 12'; Trinchinetti 51' | Report | Sessa 30' |

Pro League

| 6 December 2023 Round-Robin | Argentina | 0–0 (2–1 p) | Great Britain | Santiago del Estero, Argentina |
| | | Report |
| | Penalties |
| | Jankunas (penalty shoot-out missed); Albertario (penalty shoot-out scored); Campoy (penalty shoot-out missed); Manuele (penalty shoot-out scored) | | (penalty shoot-out missed) Howard; (penalty shoot-out scored) S. Hamilton; (penalty shoot-out missed) Petter; (penalty shoot-out missed) French; (penalty shoot-out missed) K. Robertson |

| 8 December 2023 Round-Robin | Argentina | 1–4 | Netherlands | Santiago del Estero, Argentina |
| | Granatto 18' | Report | Drummond 50'; Albers 57'; Burg 59'; Jansen 60' |

| 9 December 2023 Round-Robin | Argentina | 2–1 | Great Britain | Santiago del Estero, Argentina |
| | Gorzelany 25'; Trinchinetti 47' | Report | Howard 34' |

| 11 December 2023 Round-Robin | Argentina | 1–7 | Netherlands | Santiago del Estero, Argentina |
| | Gorzelany 58' | Report | Jansen 3'; Moes 7'; Fokke 10'; Matla 39', 49'; Dicke 42'; Sanders 45+' |

2023 goalscoring Table

| Player | FG | PC | PS | Total |
|---|---|---|---|---|
| Agustina Gorzelany | - | 13 | 1 | 14 |
| María José Granatto | 6 | 5 | - | 11 |
| Delfina Thome | 6 | 1 | - | 7 |
| Julieta Jankunas | 5 | - | - | 5 |
| Eugenia Trinchinetti | 4 | 1 | - | 5 |
| Valentina Raposo | 1 | 3 | - | 4 |
| Sofía Cairó | 3 | - | - | 3 |
| Valentina Costa Biondi | - | 1 | 2 | 2 |
| Agustina Albertario | 1 | - | - | 1 |
| Agostina Alonso | 1 | - | - | 1 |
| Pilar Campoy | - | 1 | - | 1 |
| Alina Piccardo | 1 | - | - | 1 |
| Sofía Toccalino | 1 | - | - | 1 |
| Victoria Sauze | 1 | - | - | 1 |
| Lucina von der Heyde | - | 1 | - | 1 |
| OVERALL | 29 | 27 | 3 | 59 |

2024

Pro League

| 14 February 2024 Round-Robin | Argentina | 5–0 | Belgium | Santiago del Estero, Argentina |
| | Manuele 3'; Di Santo 25'; Albertarrio 40'; Gorzelany 45'; Trinchinetti 47' | Report |

| 16 February 2024 Round-Robin | Argentina | 3–1 | Germany | Santiago del Estero, Argentina |
| | Campoy 23'; Trinchinetti 33'; Gorzelany 57' | Report | Lorenz 49' |

| 17 February 2024 Round-Robin | Argentina | 2–0 | Belgium | Santiago del Estero, Argentina |
| | Gorzelany 36'; Toccalino 50' | Report |

| 19 February 2024 Round-Robin | Argentina | 0–2 | Germany | Santiago del Estero, Argentina |
| | | Report | Huse 13'; Heinz 26' |

USA Exhibition Games

| 21 April 2024 Friendly match | United States | 1 - 3 | Argentina | Charlotte, United States |
| | unknown | | Zoe Díaz x2 Eugenia Trinchinetti |

| 23 April 2024 Friendly match | United States | 1 - 5 | Argentina | Charlotte, United States |
| | unknown | | Rocío Sánchez Moccia; Lara Casas; Zoe Díaz; María José Granatto x2 |

| 25 April 2024 Friendly match | United States | 0 - 4 | Argentina | Charlotte, United States |
| | | | Carolina Carrizo x2 Agustina Gorzelany; Eugenia Trinchinetti |

| 27 April 2024 Friendly match | United States | 0 - 1 | Argentina | Charlotte, United States |
| | | | Zoe Díaz |

Chile Exhibition Games

| 8 May 2024 Friendly match | Argentina | no data | Chile | Buenos Aires, Argentina |

| 9 May 2024 Friendly match | Argentina | no data | Chile | Buenos Aires, Argentina |

Pro League

| 22 May 2024 Round-Robin | India | 0 - 5 | Argentina | Antwerp, Belgium |
| | | Report | Gorzelany 13'; Raposo 24'; Miranda 41'; Jankunas 53', 59' |

| 23 May 2024 Round-Robin | United States | 4 - 5 | Argentina | Antwerp, Belgium |
| | Hoffman 9'; Sessa 24'; Yeager 37'; Tamer 54' | Report | Gorzelany 9', 20'; Granatto 21'; Jankunas 42'; Trinchinetti 58' |

| 25 May 2024 Round-Robin | Argentina | 4 - 0 | United States | Antwerp, Belgium |
| | Gorzelany 9'; Sauze 24'; Jankunas 45', 59' | Report |

| 26 May 2024 Round-Robin | Argentina | 3 - 0 | India | Antwerp, Belgium |
| | Di Santo 1'; Campoy 39'; Granatto 47' | Report |

| 29 May 2024 Round-Robin | China | 0 - 3 | Argentina | Antwerp, Belgium |
| | | Report | Granatto 14'; Trinchinetti 34', 60' |

| 30 May 2024 Round-Robin | Australia | 0 - 5 | Argentina | Antwerp, Belgium |
| | | Report | Antoniazzi 21'; Casas 41'; Granatto 46'; Trinchinetti 50'; Gorzelany 54' |

| 1 June 2024 Round-Robin | Argentina | 0 - 1 | Australia | Antwerp, Belgium |
| | | Report | Squibb 48' |

| 2 June 2024 Round-Robin | Argentina | 1 - 1 (3–2 p) | China | Antwerp, Belgium |
| | Gorzelany 60' | Report | Zou 29' |
| | Penalties |
| | Díaz (penalty shoot-out scored); Jankunas (penalty shoot-out scored); Thome (penalty shoot-out missed); Albertarrio (penalty shoot-out missed); Raposo (penalty shoot-out missed); Díaz (penalty shoot-out scored) | | (penalty shoot-out scored) He; (penalty shoot-out scored) Chen; (penalty shoot-out missed) Dan; (penalty shoot-out missed) Fan; (penalty shoot-out missed) Liu; (penalty shoot-out missed) He |

Pre-Olympic Exhibition Games

| 18 July 2024 Friendly match | Spain | 1 - 6 | Argentina | Valencia, Spain |
| | unknown | | Jankunas; Díaz x3 Granatto; Trinchinetti |

| 20 July 2024 Friendly match | Spain | 0 - 1 | Argentina | Valencia, Spain |
| | unknown | | Alonso |

| 23 July 2024 Friendly match | China | v | Argentina | Paris, France |

| 25 July 2024 Friendly match | Belgium | 2 - 0 | Argentina | Paris, France |
| | unknown |

Olympic Games

| 27 July 2024 Group Stage | Argentina | 4 - 1 | United States | Paris, France |
| | Sánchez Moccia 18'; Gorzelany 29'; Jankunas 44'; Díaz 47' | Report | Sessa 33' |

| 29 July 2024 Group Stage | South Africa | 2 - 4 | Argentina | Paris, France |
| | Louw 15'; De Waal 29' | | Gorzelany 17', 49', 52'; Jankunas 53' |

| 31 July 2024 Group Stage | Argentina | 2 - 1 | Spain | Paris, France |
| | Gorzelany 6'; Trinchinetti 21' | Report | Riera 34' |

| 1 August 2024 Group Stage | Argentina | 3 - 3 | Australia | Paris, France |
| | Casas 10'; Sauze 10'; Granatto 50' | Report | Nobbs 37'; Kershaw 45+'; Williams 60' |

| 3 August 2024 Group Stage | Great Britain | 0 – 3 | Argentina | Paris, France |
| | | Report | Raposo 34'; Albertario 35'; Díaz 55' |

| 5 August 2024 Quarter-final | Argentina | 1 – 1 (2–0 p) | Germany | Paris, France |
| | Jankunas 59' | Report; Penalty shootout report | Huse 57' |
| | Penalties |
| | Casas (penalty shoot-out missed); Jankunas (penalty shoot-out scored); Díaz (penalty shoot-out scored) | | (penalty shoot-out missed) Weidemann; (penalty shoot-out missed) Huse; (penalty shoot-out missed) Fleschütz; (penalty shoot-out missed) Zimmermann |

| 7 August 2024 Semifinal | Netherlands | 3 – 0 | Argentina | Paris, France |
| | Fokke 21'; Nunnink 26'; Jansen 35' | Report |

| 9 August 2024 Bronze Medal Match | Argentina | 2 – 2 (3–1 p) | Belgium | Paris, France |
| | Gorzelany 22'; Albertarrio 27' | Report; Penalty shootout report | Puvrez 8'; Rasir 27' |
| | Penalties |
| | Casas (penalty shoot-out scored); Jankunas (penalty shoot-out missed); Díaz (penalty shoot-out scored); Cairo (penalty shoot-out scored) | | (penalty shoot-out missed) Englebert; (penalty shoot-out missed) Blockmans; (penalty shoot-out scored) Rasir; (penalty shoot-out missed) Vanden Borre |

Netherlands Exhibition Game

| 6 December 2024 Friendly match | Argentina | no data | Netherlands | Buenos Aires, Argentina |

Pro League

| 10 December 2024 Round-Robin | Argentina | 2 - 2 (3–2 p) | Germany | Santiago del Estero, Argentina |
| | Larsen 8'; Jankunas 47' | Report | Krings 37'; Strauss 58' |
| | Penalties |
| | Díaz (penalty shoot-out missed); Jankunas (penalty shoot-out scored); Cairó (penalty shoot-out scored); Pisthon (penalty shoot-out missed); Alonso (penalty shoot-out scored) | | (penalty shoot-out missed) Stoffelsma; (penalty shoot-out scored) Schwabe; (penalty shoot-out scored) Strauss; (penalty shoot-out missed) Weidemann; (penalty shoot-out missed) Nolte |

| 12 December 2024 Round-Robin | Argentina | 2 - 3 | Netherlands | Santiago del Estero, Argentina |
| | Bruggesser 26'; Gorzelany 45' | Report | Fokke 13'; Y. Jansen 20'; Van der Elst 44' |

| 13 December 2024 Round-Robin | Argentina | 1 - 1 (4–5 p) | Germany | Santiago del Estero, Argentina |
| | Bruggesser 28' | Report | Schwabe 1' |
| | Penalties |
| | Díaz (penalty shoot-out scored); Jankunas (penalty shoot-out scored); Bruggesser (penalty shoot-out scored); Cairó (penalty shoot-out scored); Alonso (penalty shoot-out missed) | | (penalty shoot-out scored) Frerichs; (penalty shoot-out scored) Schwabe; (penalty shoot-out scored) Strauss; (penalty shoot-out scored) Nolte; (penalty shoot-out scored) Kurz |

| 15 December 2024 Round-Robin | Argentina | 3 - 2 | Netherlands | Santiago del Estero, Argentina |
| | Díaz 5'; Castellaro 52'; Granatto 58' | Report | Van der Elst 15'; Winter 53' |

2024 goalscoring Table

| Player | FG | PC | PS | Total |
|---|---|---|---|---|
| Agustina Gorzelany | - | 12 | 4 | 16 |
| Julieta Jankunas | 8 | 1 | - | 9 |
| Eugenia Trinchinetti | 3 | 4 | - | 7 |
| María José Granatto | 1 | 5 | - | 6 |
| Agustina Albertario | 3 | - | - | 3 |
| Pilar Campoy | 2 | - | - | 2 |
| Lara Casas | 1 | 1 | - | 2 |
| Celina di Santo | 2 | - | - | 2 |
| Zoe Díaz | 3 | - | - | 3 |
| Brisa Bruggesser | 2 | - | - | 2 |
| Valentina Raposo | 1 | 1 | - | 2 |
| Victoria Sauze | 1 | 1 | - | 2 |
| Stefanía Antoniazzi | 1 | - | - | 1 |
| Juana Castellaro | - | 1 | - | 1 |
| María Emilia Larsen | 1 | - | - | 1 |
| Victoria Manuele | 1 | - | - | 1 |
| Victoria Miranda | 1 | - | - | 1 |
| Rocío Sánchez Moccia | 1 | - | - | 1 |
| Sofía Toccalino | 1 | - | - | 1 |
| OVERALL | 34 | 26 | 4 | 64 |

2025

Pro League

| 19 February 2025 Round-Robin | Argentina | 2 - 3 | Belgium | Santiago del Estero, Argentina |
| | Gorzelany 10', 24' | Report | Vanden Borre 27', 40'; Gerniers 33' |

| 20 February 2025 Round-Robin | Argentina | 2 - 1 | Australia | Santiago del Estero, Argentina |
| | Bruggesser 7'; Gorzelany 14' | Report | J. Smith 48' |

| 22 February 2025 Round-Robin | Argentina | 0 - 0 (2–0 p) | Belgium | Santiago del Estero, Argentina |
| | | Report |
| | Penalties |
| | Díaz (penalty shoot-out missed); Bruggesser (penalty shoot-out missed); Gorzelany (penalty shoot-out scored); Albertario (penalty shoot-out scored) | | (penalty shoot-out missed) Dewaet; (penalty shoot-out missed) Ballenghien; (penalty shoot-out missed) D. Marien; (penalty shoot-out missed) Englebert |

| 23 February 2025 Round-Robin | Argentina | 2 - 1 | Australia | Santiago del Estero, Argentina |
| | Gorzelany 6'; Bruggesser 22' | Report | J. Smith 5' |

Uruguay and Chile Exhibition Games

| 12 May 2025 Test-Match | Argentina | 6 - 1 | Uruguay | Buenos Aires, Argentina |
| | no data | | no data |

| 14 May 2025 Test-Match | Argentina | 3 - 0 | Uruguay | Buenos Aires, Argentina |
| | no data |

| 19 May 2025 Test-Match | Argentina | 3 - 0 | Chile | Buenos Aires, Argentina |
| | no data |

| 20 May 2025 Test-Match | Argentina | 5 - 0 | Chile | Buenos Aires, Argentina |
| | no data |

Pro League

| 7 June 2025 Round-Robin | Spain | 0 - 6 | Argentina | Valencia, Spain |
| | | Report | Díaz 4'; Bruggesser 24'; Gorzelany 26', 58'; V. Granatto 29'; Pisthón 50' |

| 8 June 2025 Round-Robin | Spain | 0 - 2 | Argentina | Valencia, Spain |
| | | Report | Falasco 29'; Bruggesser 32' |

| 14 June 2025 Round-Robin | England | 1 - 3 | Argentina | London, England |
| | Curtis 12' | Report | Gorzelany 9', 19'; Jankunas 59' |

| 15 June 2025 Round-Robin | England | 0 - 1 | Argentina | London, England |
| | | Report | Gorzelany 17' |

| 17 June 2025 Round-Robin | Argentina | 4 - 1 | India | London, England |
| | Falasco 29'; Gorzelany 40', 54', 59' | Report | Deepika 30' |

| 18 June 2025 Round-Robin | India | 2 - 2 (0–2 p) | Argentina | London, England |
| | Navneet 50'; Deepika 56' | Report | Gorzelany 27', 37' |
| | Penalties |
| | Deepika (penalty shoot-out missed); Rutuja (penalty shoot-out missed); Lalremsiami (penalty shoot-out missed); Baljeet (penalty shoot-out missed) | | (penalty shoot-out missed) Díaz; (penalty shoot-out scored) Bruggesser; (penalty shoot-out missed) Jankunas; (penalty shoot-out scored) Cairó |

| 21 June 2025 Round-Robin | Argentina | 3 - 1 | China | Berlin, Germany |
| | Ortiz 10'; Falasco 18'; Jankunas 58' | Report | Chen Yi 2' |

| 22 June 2025 Round-Robin | China | 2 - 1 | Argentina | Berlin, Germany |
| | Deng 3'; Ma 25' | Report | Granatto 1' |

PanAm Cup

| 24 July 2025 Pool A | Argentina | 3 – 0 | Uruguay | Montevideo, Uruguay |
| | Gorzelany 43'; Raposo 49'; Bruggesser 50' | Report |

| 26 July 2025 Pool A | Canada | 0 – 4 | Argentina | Montevideo, Uruguay |
| | | Report | Gorzelany 7', 13', 60'; Díaz 44' |

| 28 July 2025 Pool A | Argentina | 16 – 0 | Paraguay | Montevideo, Uruguay |
| | Gorzelany 5', 14', 27', 28'; V. Granatto 6', 37'; Ambrosini 23'; Díaz 31', 43', 55'; Raposo 39'; M. Granatto 41'; Bruggesser 46'; Jankunas 52'; Miranda 52'; Falasco 57' | Report |

| 1st August 2025 Semi-finals | Argentina | 2 – 0 | Chile | Montevideo, Uruguay |
| | V. Granatto 7'; Gorzelany 43' | Report |

| 3 August 2025 Gold medal match | Argentina | 3–0 | United States | Montevideo, Uruguay |
| | Gorzelany 5'; Trinchinetti 31'; Jankunas 60' | Report |

United States Exhibition Games

| 22 October 2025 Test-Match | United States | 0 - 1 | Argentina | Charlotte, United States |
| | | | M. Granatto |

| 24 October 2025 Test-Match | United States | 0 - 3 | Argentina | Charlotte, United States |
| | | | V. Granatto; V. Granatto; Gorzelany |

| 26 October 2025 Test-Match | United States | 0 - 4 | Argentina | Charlotte, United States |
| | | | V. Granatto; Bruggesser; Bruggesser; Ovejero |

| 28 October 2025 Test-Match | United States | 2 - 4 | Argentina | Charlotte, United States |
| | | | Trinchinetti; Ovejero; V. Granatto; V. Granatto |

Pro League

| 10 December 2025 Round-Robin | Argentina | 1 – 0 | Germany | Santiago del Estero, Argentina |
| | Gorzelany 13' | Report |

| 11 December 2025 Round-Robin | Argentina | 0 – 4 | Netherlands | Santiago del Estero, Argentina |
| | | Report | Matla 15', 18'; Moes 33'; Dicke 43' |

| 13 December 2025 Round-Robin | Argentina | 1–1 (5–4 p) | Germany | Santiago del Estero, Argentina |
| | V. Granatto 2' | Report | Micheel 38' |
| | Penalties |
| | Jankunas (penalty shoot-out missed); Bruggesser (penalty shoot-out missed); V. Granatto (penalty shoot-out scored); Cairó (penalty shoot-out scored); Esandi (penalty shoot-out scored); Cairó (penalty shoot-out scored); V. Granatto (penalty shoot-out scored) | | (penalty shoot-out scored) Zimmermann; (penalty shoot-out scored) Zhong; (penalty shoot-out missed) Wiedermann; (penalty shoot-out scored) Micheel; (penalty shoot-out missed) Zhong; (penalty shoot-out scored) Zimmermann; (penalty shoot-out missed) Zhong |

| 14 December 2025 Round-Robin | Argentina | Cancelled | Netherlands | Santiago del Estero, Argentina |

2025 goalscoring Table

| Player | FG | PC | PS | Total |
|---|---|---|---|---|
| Agustina Gorzelany | - | 18 | 7 | 25 |
| Brisa Bruggesser | 6 | - | - | 6 |
| Zoe Díaz | 5 | - | - | 5 |
| Victoria Granatto | 4 | 1 | - | 5 |
| Victoria Falasco | 4 | - | - | 4 |
| Julieta Jankunas | 4 | - | - | 4 |
| María José Granatto | 2 | - | - | 2 |
| Valentina Raposo | - | 2 | - | 2 |
| Chiara Ambrosini | - | 1 | - | 1 |
| Victoria Miranda | - | 1 | - | 1 |
| Paula Ortiz | 1 | - | - | 1 |
| Lourdes Pisthón | 1 | - | - | 1 |
| Eugenia Trinchinetti | 1 | - | - | 1 |
| OVERALL | 29 | 23 | 7 | 58 |

=== 2026 ===
Chile Exhibition Games

| 27 January 2026 Test-Match | Argentina | 3–1 | Chile | Buenos Aires, Argentina |
| | no data |

| 28 January 2026 Test-Match | Argentina | 2–0 | Chile | Buenos Aires, Argentina |
| | no data |

Pro League

| 10 February 2026 Round-Robin | Ireland | 0–5 | Argentina | Hobart, Australia |
| | | Report | Gorzelany 16'; Bruggesser 19'; Jankunas 35'; Granatto M. 45'; Casas 55' |

| 11 February 2026 Round-Robin | Australia | 0–1 | Argentina | Hobart, Australia |
| | | Report | Gorzelany 39' |

| 13 February 2026 Round-Robin | Argentina | 2–1 | Ireland | Hobart, Australia |
| | Granatto 15'; Gorzelany 37' | Report | McAuley 3' |

| 14 February 2026 Round-Robin | Australia | 0–3 | Argentina | Hobart, Australia |
| | | Report | Díaz 17'; Trinchinetti 44'; Gorzelany 48' |

India Exhibition Games

| 13 April 2026 Test-Match | Argentina | 4–2 | India | Buenos Aires, Argentina |
| | Jankunas; Granatto V. Ortiz; Larsen | | no data |

| 14 April 2026 Test-Match | Argentina | 2–1 | India | Buenos Aires, Argentina |
| | Gorzelany x2 | | no data |

| 16 April 2026 Test-Match | Argentina | 1–2 | India | Buenos Aires, Argentina |
| | Gorzelany |

| 17 April 2026 Test-Match | Argentina | 0–0 (2–3 p) | India | Buenos Aires, Argentina |

China Exhibition Games

| 27 April 2026 Test-Match | Argentina | 3-2 | New Zealand | Changzhou, China |
| | Alastra; Bruggesser; Díaz | | no data |

| 28 April 2026 Test-Match | China | 1-1 (2–3 p) | Argentina | Changzhou, China |
| | no data | | Granatto M. |

| 30 April 2026 Test-Match | China | 2-1 | Argentina | Changzhou, China |
| | no data | | Granatto M. |

| 1st May 2026 Test-Match | Argentina | 3-2 | New Zealand | Changzhou, China |
| | Ambrosini; Díaz; Pisthón | | Cotter; Findlay |

| 3 May 2026 Test-Match | Argentina | 7-0 | New Zealand | Changzhou, China |
| | Granatto M. x2 Pisthón; Raposo; Trinchinetti; Miranda; Bruggesser |

| 4 May 2026 Test-Match | China | 2-2 (5–4 p) | Argentina | Changzhou, China |
| | no data | | Granatto M. Castellaro |

Pro League

| 13 June 2026 Round-Robin | China | 1–4 | Argentina | Wavre, Belgium |
| | Liu 1' | Report | Granatto V. 30'; Pisthón 38'; Gorzelany 46'; Alastra 49' |

| 14 June 2026 Round-Robin | Belgium | 2–2 (1–2 p) | Argentina | Wavre, Belgium |
| | Marien 34'; Vanden Borre 47' | Report | Bruggesser 5'; Díaz 33' |
| | Penalties |
| | Van Heel (penalty shoot-out scored); Puvrez (penalty shoot-out missed); Englebert (penalty shoot-out missed); Rasir (penalty shoot-out missed); Struijk (penalty shoot-out missed) | | (penalty shoot-out scored) Granatto; (penalty shoot-out missed) Bruggesser; (penalty shoot-out missed) Cairo; (penalty shoot-out scored) Jankunas |

| 20 June 2026 Round-Robin | Belgium | 2–3 | Argentina | Wavre, Belgium |
| | Van Heel 51'; Englebert 57' | Report | Jankunas 3'; Gorzelany 45', 60' |

| 21 June 2026 Round-Robin | Argentina | 3–3 (4–3 p) | China | Wavre, Belgium |
| | Gorzelany 6'; Miranda 30+'; Pisthón 38' | Report | Zhang Y. 11', 51'; Chen 21' |
| | Penalties |
| | Granatto (penalty shoot-out scored); Cairo (penalty shoot-out scored); Jankunas (penalty shoot-out scored); Casas (penalty shoot-out missed); Díaz (penalty shoot-out scored) | | (penalty shoot-out scored) Li; (penalty shoot-out scored) Fan; (penalty shoot-out missed) Liu; (penalty shoot-out scored) Dan; (penalty shoot-out missed) Zhang Y. |

| 23 June 2026 Round-Robin | Spain | 2–1 | Argentina | London, England |
| | Molina 41'; Amundson 50' | Report | Alonso 15' |

| 25 June 2026 Round-Robin | England | 0–0 (4–2 p) | Argentina | London, England |
| | | Report |
| | Penalties |
| | Crackles (penalty shoot-out scored); Bourne (penalty shoot-out scored); Bingham (penalty shoot-out missed); Curtis (penalty shoot-out scored); Howard (penalty shoot-out scored) | | (penalty shoot-out scored) Bruggesser; (penalty shoot-out missed) Miranda; (penalty shoot-out missed) V. Granatto; (penalty shoot-out scored) Cairó |

| 26 June 2026 Round-Robin | Argentina | 2–0 | Spain | London, England |
| | Trinchinetti 46'; Bruggesser 60' | Report |

| 28 June 2026 Round-Robin | England | 3–2 | Argentina | London, England |
| | Toman 11'; Rayer 16'; Hunt 33' | Report | Trinchinetti 5'; Gorzelany 45+' |

World Cup

| 15 August 2026 Pool B | Argentina | 1–1 | United States | Wavre, Belgium |
| | Bruggesser 11' | Report | DeBerdine 27' |

| 17 August 2026 Pool B | Germany | 2–3 | Argentina | Wavre, Belgium |
| | Nolte 51'; Zimmermann 53' | Report | Trinchinetti 3'; Gorzelany 48', 56' |

| 19 August 2026 Pool B | Argentina | 2–0 | Scotland | Wavre, Belgium |
| | Granatto 11'; Casas 41' | Report |

| 22 August 2026 Pool F | Argentina | 3–0 | Spain | Wavre, Belgium |
| | Gorzelany 1', 14'; Castellaro 3' | Report |

| 24 August 2026 Pool F | Belgium | 0–0 | Argentina | Wavre, Belgium |
| | | Report |

| 27 August 2026 Semi final | Argentina | 1–0 | Australia | Wavre, Belgium |
| | Jankunas 47' | Report |

| 29 August 2026 Final | Netherlands | 1–1 (1–3 p) | Argentina | Amstelveen, Netherlands |
| | Y. Jansen 30' | Report | M. Granatto 54' |
| | Penalties |
| | Sanders (penalty shoot-out missed); Albers (penalty shoot-out missed); Veen (penalty shoot-out scored); Moes (penalty shoot-out missed) | | (penalty shoot-out scored) V. Granatto; (penalty shoot-out scored) Bruggesser; (penalty shoot-out missed) Díaz; (penalty shoot-out scored) Cairo |

South American Games

| 14 September 2026 Pool A | Argentina | 14–0 | Paraguay | Santa Fe, Argentina |
| | Díaz 4', 22'; Palacio 11', 41'; Casas 14', 21', 53'; Bruggesser 19', 25'; Pisthon 27'; Andrade 28', 54'; Alastra 45', 60' | Report |

| 15 September 2026 Pool A | Uruguay | 0–5 | Argentina | Santa Fe, Argentina |
| | | Report | Andrade 15'; Palacio 29'; Alastra 45', 45'; Díaz 51' |

| 18 September 2026 Pool A | Chile | 1–5 | Argentina | Santa Fe, Argentina |
| | Urroz 13' | Report | L. Pisthón 10'; Bruggesser 20'; Casas 40', 43'; Ambrosini 48' |

| 20 September 2026 Pool A | Argentina | 19–1 | Peru | Santa Fe, Argentina |
| | Pacheco 5', 26'; Díaz 9', 10', 27', 57'; Andrade 12', 35', 48'; Cairó 16'; Alastra 17', 48'; Ambrosini 48', 52'; L. Pisthón 32', 45'; Casas 42'; Pagella 47'; Bruggesser 58' | Report | Montes 59' |

| 22 September 2026 Gold medal match | Argentina | 5–0 | Chile | Santa Fe, Argentina |
| | Casas 5'; Palacio 27'; Andrade 28'; L. Pisthón 39', 55' | Report |

Pro League

| December 2026 Argentina Leg | Argentina | v | Great Britain | Córdoba, Argentina |

| December 2026 Argentina Leg | Argentina | v | China | Córdoba, Argentina |

| December 2026 Argentina Leg | Argentina | v | Great Britain | Córdoba, Argentina |

| December 2026 Argentina Leg | Argentina | v | China | Córdoba, Argentina |

Goalscoring Table

| Player | FG | PC | PS | Total |
|---|---|---|---|---|
| Agustina Gorzelany | - | 9 | 3 | 12 |
| Lara Casas | 4 | 5 | - | 9 |
| Zoe Díaz | 9 | - | - | 9 |
| Brisa Bruggesser | 8 | - | - | 8 |
| Lourdes Pisthón | 6 | 2 | - | 8 |
| Milagros Alastra | - | 7 | - | 7 |
| Catalina Andrade | 7 | - | - | 7 |
| María José Granatto | 2 | 2 | - | 4 |
| Pilar Palacio | 3 | 1 | - | 4 |
| Chiara Ambrosini | - | 3 | - | 3 |
| Julieta Jankunas | 1 | 2 | - | 3 |
| Eugenia Trinchinetti | 2 | 1 | - | 3 |
| Daiana Pacheco | 2 | - | - | 2 |
| Agostina Alonso | 1 | - | - | 1 |
| Sofía Cairó | 1 | - | - | 1 |
| Juana Castellaro | - | 1 | - | 1 |
| Victoria Granatto | 1 | - | - | 1 |
| Victoria Miranda | - | 1 | - | 1 |
| Sol Pagella | 1 | - | - | 1 |
| OVERALL | 50 | 34 | 3 | 87 |

- Goals at unofficial matches not included

=== 2027 ===
Pro League

| February 2027 Argentina Leg | Argentina | v | Germany | Rosario, Argentina |

| February 2027 Argentina Leg | Argentina | v | India | Rosario, Argentina |

| February 2027 Argentina Leg | Argentina | v | Germany | Rosario, Argentina |

| February 2027 Argentina Leg | Argentina | v | India | Rosario, Argentina |

| June 2027 Belgium Leg | Belgium | v | Argentina | Wavre, Belgium |

| June 2027 Belgium Leg | Belgium | v | Argentina | Wavre, Belgium |

| June 2027 Belgium Leg | Australia | v | Argentina | Wavre, Belgium |

| June 2027 Belgium Leg | Argentina | v | Australia | Wavre, Belgium |

| June 2027 Netherlands Leg | Spain | v | Argentina | TBD, Netherlands |

| June 2027 Netherlands Leg | Argentina | v | Spain | TBD, Netherlands |

| June 2027 Netherlands Leg | Netherlands | v | Argentina | TBD, Netherlands |

| June 2027 Netherlands Leg | Netherlands | v | Argentina | TBD, Netherlands |

== Annual call-ups ==
Previous to 1998, there is not information more than the names competing on each tournament.

1998

Coach: Sergio Vigil

- Magdalena Aicega (3)
- Mariela Antoniska (13) ▲
- Luciana Aymar (15) ▲
- Anabel Gambero (5)
- Mariana González Oliva (12)
- Alejandra Gulla (4) ▲
- Gabriela Liz (7) ▲
- Sofía MacKenzie (2)
- Mercedes Margalot (14) ▲
- Karina Masotta (11)
- Laura Mulhall (1) ▲
- Vanina Oneto (9)
- Gabriela Pando (8)
- Jorgelina Rimoldi (10)
- Cecilia Rognoni (16)
- Ayelén Stepnik (6)
1999

Coach: Sergio Vigil

- Magdalena Aicega (3)
- Mariela Antoniska (1)
- Inés Arrondo (18) ▲
- Luciana Aymar (8)
- Silvia Corvalán (4) ▲
- Anabel Gambero (5)
- Soledad García (2) ▲
- Mariana González Oliva (12)
- Alejandra Gulla (9)
- Andrea Haines (17) ▲
- María de la Paz Hernández (7)
- Mercedes Margalot (14)
- Karina Masotta (11)
- Natalia Morello (15) ▲
- Vanina Oneto
- Jorgelina Rimoldi (10)
- Cecilia Rognoni (16)
- Ayelén Stepnik (6)
- Paola Vukojicic (18) ▲
2000

Coach: Sergio Vigil

- Magdalena Aicega (3)
- Mariela Antoniska (1)
- Inés Arrondo (7)
- Luciana Aymar (8)
- María Paz Ferrari (4) ▲
- Anabel Gambero (5)
- Soledad García (2)
- Mariana González Oliva (12)
- Andrea Haines (17)
- María de la Paz Hernández (15)
- Laura Maiztegui (13) ▲
- Mercedes Margalot (14)
- Karina Masotta (11)
- Vanina Oneto (9)
- Jorgelina Rimoldi (10)
- Cecilia Rognoni (16)
- Ayelén Stepnik (6)
- Paola Vukojicic (18)
2001

Coach: Sergio Vigil

- Magdalena Aicega (3)
- Virginia Alonso ▲
- Lucía Antona ▲
- Mariela Antoniska (1)
- Carolina Armani ▲
- Inés Arrondo (4)
- Luciana Aymar (8)
- María Victoria Baetti ▲
- Bettina Balbiani ▲
- Claudia Burkart (24) ▲
- Matilde Canavosio ▲
- Ángela Cattaneo (22) ▲
- Florencia D'Elía (17) ▲
- Cecilia del Carril ▲
- Natalí Doreski (23) ▲
- Anabel Gambero (5)
- Soledad García (2)
- Mariana González Oliva (12)
- Alejandra Gulla (7) ▲
- María de la Paz Hernández (15)
- Laura Maiztegui (13)
- Mercedes Margalot (14)
- Karina Masotta (11)
- María Reyna Moya ▲
- Vanina Oneto (9)
- Jorgelina Rimoldi (10)
- Macarena Rodríguez ▲
- Cecilia Rognoni (16)
- Mariné Russo (19) ▲
- Nadia Silva ▲
- Ayelén Stepnik (6)
- Paola Vukojicic (18)
2002

Coach: Sergio Vigil

- Magdalena Aicega (3)
- Mariela Antoniska (1)
- Inés Arrondo (21)
- Luciana Aymar (8)
- Claudia Burkart (24)
- Natalí Doreski (23)
- María Paz Ferrari (4) ▲
- Anabel Gambero (5)
- Soledad García (2)
- Mariana González Oliva (12)
- Alejandra Gulla (7)
- María de la Paz Hernández (15)
- Laura Maiztegui (13)
- Mercedes Margalot (14)
- Karina Masotta (11)
- Vanina Oneto (9)
- María Inés Parodi (17) ▲
- Cecilia Rognoni (16)
- Mariné Russo (19)
- Ayelén Stepnik (6)
- Paola Vukojicic (18)
2003

Coach: Sergio Vigil

- Gabriela Aguirre (22b) ▲
- Magdalena Aicega (3)
- Mariela Antoniska (1)
- Carolina Armani ▲
- Inés Arrondo (21)
- Luciana Aymar (8)
- María Victoria Baetti ▲
- Noel Barrionuevo (27) ▲
- Marien Bianchini (2) ▲
- Agustina Bouza (9b) ▲
- Claudia Burkart (24)
- Ángela Cattaneo (22) ▲
- Florencia D'Elía (17b) ▲
- Silvina D'Elía (25) ▲
- Cecilia del Carril (11) ▲
- Marina di Giacomo (5) ▲
- Natalí Doreski (23)
- María Paz Ferrari (4)
- Soledad García (10)
- Mariana González Oliva (12)
- Alejandra Gulla (7)
- María de la Paz Hernández (15)
- Giselle Kañevsky (26) ▲
- Laura Maiztegui (13)
- Daniela Maloberti (29) ▲
- Mercedes Margalot (14)
- Vanina Oneto (9)
- Belén Pallito (5b) ▲
- María Inés Parodi (17)
- Macarena Rodríguez (28) ▲
- Cecilia Rognoni (16)
- Yanina Rojas (32) ▲
- Andrea Rubin (31) ▲
- Mariné Russo (19)
- Nadia Silva (20) ▲
- Ayelén Stepnik (6)
- Belén Succi (28b) ▲
- Paola Vukojicic (18)
- Mariana Camilloni
- Candelaria Méndez
- Gabriela Monis
- Carla Rebecchi
- Juliana Schoeller
- Belén Simmermacher
2004

Coach: Sergio Vigil

- Magdalena Aicega (3)
- Mariela Antoniska (1)
- Inés Arrondo (21)
- Luciana Aymar (8)
- Claudia Burkart (24)
- Ángela Cattaneo (22)
- Marina di Giacomo (5)
- Natalí Doreski (23)
- María Paz Ferrari (4)
- Soledad García (10)
- Mariana González Oliva (12)
- Alejandra Gulla (7)
- María de la Paz Hernández (15)
- Mercedes Margalot (14)
- Vanina Oneto (9)
- Lucía Pereyra ▲
- Carla Rebecchi (20) ▲
- Macarena Rodríguez (28)
- Cecilia Rognoni (16)
- Mariné Russo (19)
- Ayelén Stepnik (6)
- Paola Vukojicic (18)
2005

Coach: Gabriel Minadeo—February

- Magdalena Aicega (3)
- Laura Aladro (13) ▲
- Mariela Antoniska (1)
- Inés Arrondo (21)
- Luciana Aymar (8)
- Victoria Baetti ▲
- Marien Bianchini (2) ▲
- Claudia Burkart (24)
- Florencia D'Elía (17) ▲
- Natalí Doreski (23)
- María Paz Ferrari
- Eugenia Ferrero ▲
- Soledad García (10)
- Mariana González Oliva (12)
- Alejandra Gulla (7)
- María de la Paz Hernández (15)
- Rosario Luchetti (4) ▲
- Daniela Maloberti (29) ▲
- Mercedes Margalot (14)
- Vanina Nieruczkow ▲
- Belén Pallitto (5) ▲
- María José Palmieri ▲
- Romina Pzellinsky ▲
- Carla Rebecchi (11)
- Macarena Rodríguez (9)
- Cecilia Rognoni (16)
- Mariné Russo (19)
- Melisa Salmieri ▲
- Ayelén Stepnik (6)
- Anahí Totongi ▲
- Romina Vatteone ▲
- Paola Vukojicic (18)

Added in April:

- Angela Cattáneo ▲
- Cecilia del Carril ▲
2006

Coach: Gabriel Minadeo

- Gabriela Aguirre (22) ▲
- Magdalena Aicega (3)
- Laura Aladro (13)
- Mariela Antoniska (1)
- Luciana Aymar (8)
- Noel Barrionuevo (27) ▲
- Marien Bianchini (2)
- Agustina Bouza (9) ▲
- Claudia Burkart (24)
- Florencia D'Elía (17)
- Silvina D'Elía (25) ▲
- Soledad García (10)
- Mariana González Oliva (12)
- Alejandra Gulla (7)
- María de la Paz Hernández (15)
- Giselle Kañevsky (26) ▲
- Rosario Luchetti (4)
- Daniela Maloberti (29)
- Mercedes Margalot (14)
- Belén Pallitto (5)
- Carla Rebecchi (11)
- Yanina Rojas (32) ▲
- Andrea Rubin (31) ▲
- Mariné Russo (19)
- Nadia Silva (20) ▲
- Ayelén Stepnik (6)
- Belén Succi (28) ▲
- Paola Vukojicic (18)
2007

Coach: Gabriel Minadeo—February

- Gabriela Aguirre (22)
- Magdalena Aicega (3)
- Laura Aladro (13)
- Luciana Aymar (8)
- Noel Barrionuevo (27)
- Agustina Bouza (9)
- Claudia Burkart (24)
- Amalia Cerutti ▲
- Silvina D'Elía (25)
- Soledad García (10)
- Mariana González Oliva (12)
- Alejandra Gulla (7)
- María de la Paz Hernández (15)
- Giselle Kañevsky (26)
- Rosario Luchetti (4)
- Daniela Maloberti (16)
- Mercedes Margalot (14)
- Belén Pallitto (5)
- Mariana Pozzolo ▲
- Carla Rebecchi (11)
- Belén Rivas (29) ▲
- Sofía Román (30) ▲
- Mariné Russo (19)
- Nadia Silva (20)
- Belén Succi (1)
- Paola Vukojicic (18)
2008

Coach: Gabriel Minadeo—January

- Gabriela Aguirre (22)
- Magdalena Aicega (3)
- Laura Aladro (13)
- Luciana Aymar (8)
- Noel Barrionuevo (27)
- Agustina Bouza (9)
- Claudia Burkart (24)
- Silvina D'Elía (25)
- Soledad García (10)
- Mariana González Oliva (12)
- Alejandra Gulla (7)
- María de la Paz Hernández (15)
- Giselle Kañevsky (26)
- Rosario Luchetti (4)
- Mercedes Margalot (14)
- Belén Pallitto (5)
- Carla Rebecchi (11)
- Mariana Rossi (16) ▲
- Mariné Russo (19)
- Belén Succi (1)
- Paola Vukojicic (18)
2009

Coach: Gabriel Minadeo—January

- Macarena Abente (15) ▲
- Gabriela Aguirre (22)
- Laura Aladro (13)
- Inés Arrondo (21) ▲
- Luciana Aymar (8)
- Noel Barrionuevo (27)
- Claudia Burkart (24)
- Silvina D'Elía (25)
- Ivana Dell'Era (23) ▲
- Soledad García (10)
- Alejandra Gulla (7)
- Giselle Kañevsky (26)
- Rosario Luchetti (4)
- Mercedes Margalot (14)
- Delfina Merino (2) ▲
- Sol Parral (6) ▲
- Carla Rebecchi (11)
- Yanina Rojas (9) ▲
- Mariana Rossi (16)
- Mariné Russo (19)
- Rocío Sánchez Moccia (5) ▲
- Daniela Sruoga (18) ▲
- Belén Succi (1)
- Victoria Villalba (17) ▲
- Victoria Zuloaga (20) ▲

Coach: Carlos Retegui—March

- Macarena Abente (15)
- Gabriela Aguirre (22)
- Laura Aladro (13)
- Carolina Armani ▲
- Carolina Arrieta ▲
- Luciana Aymar (8)
- Noel Barrionuevo (27)
- Claudia Burkart (24)
- Florencia Calvete ▲
- ~~Florencia D'Elía~~ ▲
- Silvina D'Elía (25)
- Laura del Colle (31) ▲
- Ivana Dell'Era (23)
- Carla Dupuy (9) ▲
- Geraldine Fresco Pisani (17) ▲
- Soledad García (10)
- Kim Grant ▲
- Alejandra Gulla (7)
- Giselle Kañevsky (26)
- Rosario Luchetti (4)
- Pilar Méjico (32) ▲
- Candelaria Méndez ▲
- Delfina Merino (2)
- Sol Parral
- Carla Rebecchi (11)
- Mariana Rossi (16)
- Mariné Russo (19)
- Rocío Sánchez Moccia (5)
- Mariela Scarone (21) ▲
- Daniela Sruoga (18)
- Josefina Sruoga (30) ▲
- ~~Ayelén Stepnik~~ (6) ▲
- Belén Succi (1)
- Rocío Ubeira (12) ▲
- Josefina Wohlfeiler ▲
- Victoria Zuloaga (20)
2010

Coach: Carlos Retegui—March

- Macarena Abente (15)
- Laura Aladro (13)
- Luciana Aymar (8)
- Noel Barrionuevo (27)
- Claudia Burkart (24)
- Marcela Casale (32) ▲
- Silvina D'Elía (25)
- Carla Dupuy (9)
- Soledad García (10)
- Alejandra Gulla (7)
- Giselle Kañevsky (26)
- Rosario Luchetti (4)
- Sofía Maccari ▲
- Pilar Méjico (31)
- Delfina Merino (12)
- Carla Rebecchi (11)
- Macarena Rodríguez (5) ▲
- Cecilia Rognoni (16) ▲
- Mariana Rossi (2)
- Mariné Russo (19)
- Mariela Scarone (21)
- Daniela Sruoga (18)
- Josefina Sruoga (30)
- Belén Succi (1)
- Romina Vatteone (14) ▲
- Florencia Calvete
- Pilar Campoy (17)
- Martina Cavallero (8b)
- Jimena Cedrés
- Ivana Dell'Era
- María José Fernández (21b)
- Eugenia Ferrero
- Geraldine Fresco Pisani
- Denisse Fuhr
- Rocío González Canda (23)
- Kim Grant
- María Guajardo
- Romina Lozzia (11b)
- Julieta Medici (14b)
- Sol Parral (3)
- Josefina Segura (22)
- Mercedes Socino (4b)
- Luciana Soraco (16b)
- Mariana Tarelli
- Rocío Ubeira (12b)
- Belén Zavalía (29)
- Victoria Zuloaga (20)

Coach: Carlos Retegui—April (Olympic Projection Group)

- Macarena Abente (15)
- Constanza Aguirre
- Florencia Calvete
- Pilar Campoy (17)
- Martina Cavallero (8)
- Natalia del Frari
- María José Fernández (21)
- Denisse Fuhr
- Rocío González Canda (23)
- Laura Kraselnik
- Romina Lozzia (11)
- Aylín Martínez
- Julieta Medici (14)
- Pilar Méjico (31)
- Tatiana Minadeo
- Mercedes Moreschi
- Bárbara Muzaber
- Mercedes Socino (4)
- Luciana Soraco (16)
- Mercedes Stornini
- Belén Zavalía (29)
- Victoria Zuloaga (20)

Coach: Carlos Retegui—September

- Macarena Abente (15) ▲
- Laura Aladro (13)
- Luciana Aymar (8)
- Noel Barrionuevo (27)
- Marcela Casale (32)
- Martina Cavallero ▲
- Jimena Cedrés ▲
- Silvina D'Elía (25)
- Laura del Colle ▲
- Carla Dupuy (9)
- Soledad García (10)
- María José Fernández (24) ▲
- Giselle Kañevsky (26)
- Rosario Luchetti (4)
- Delfina Merino (12)
- Melisa Pinter ▲
- Carla Rebecchi (11)
- Macarena Rodríguez (5)
- Mariela Scarone (21)
- Luciana Soracco (16) ▲
- Daniela Sruoga (18)
- Josefina Sruoga (30)
- Belén Succi (1)
- Belén Zavalía (29) ▲
- Victoria Zuloaga (20) ▲

Coach: Carlos Retegui—September (Olympic Projection Group)

- Gabriela Aguirre
- Agustina Albertario
- Julieta Alonso
- Agustina Bouza
- Camila Bustos
- Florencia Calvete
- Natalia del Frari
- Belén Facciano
- Eugenia Garraffo
- Rocío González Canda
- Florencia Habif
- Ana López Basavilbaso
- Romina Lozzia
- Gabriela Ludueña
- Sofía Maccari
- Aylín Martínez
- Julieta Medici
- Tatiana Minadeo
- Bárbara Muzaber
- Ángeles Ortiz
- Sofía Paglione
- Mailén Piparo
- Victoria Richards
- Ayelén Roldán
- Florencia Sacheto
- Rocío Sánchez Moccia
- Mercedes Socino
- Mercedes Stornini
2011

Coach: Carlos Retegui—January

- Laura Aladro (13)
- Luciana Aymar (8)
- Noel Barrionuevo (27)
- Marcela Casale (32)
- Martina Cavallero (14) ▲
- Jimena Cedrés (7) ▲
- Silvina D'Elía (25)
- Natalia del Frari (6) ▲
- Carla Dupuy (9)
- Soledad García (10)
- Eugenia Garraffo (28) ▲
- Rocío González Canda (24) ▲
- Florencia Habif (16) ▲
- Giselle Kañevsky (26)
- Ana López Basavilbaso (23) ▲
- Rosario Luchetti (4)
- Sofía Maccari (19)
- Delfina Merino (12)
- Carla Rebecchi (11)
- Macarena Rodríguez (5)
- Rocío Sánchez Moccia (17) ▲
- Julia Simonassi ▲
- Mariela Scarone (21)
- Daniela Sruoga (18)
- Josefina Sruoga (30)
- Belén Succi (1)
- Victoria Zuloaga (20) ▲
- Macarena Abente
- Constanza Aguirre (7b)
- Agustina Albertario
- Julieta Alonso
- Agustina Bouza (10b)
- Camila Bustos (11b)
- Victoria Cabut
- Florencia Calvete
- Carla de Berti
- Belén Facciano (5b)
- María José Fernández (21b)
- Denisse Fuhr
- Victoria Granatto
- Gabriela Koltes
- Romina Lozzia (15b)
- Gabriela Ludueña
- Valentina Magnone (1b)
- Aylín Martínez
- Eugenia Mastronardi (24b)
- Tatiana Minadeo
- Bárbara Muzaber (19b)
- Martina Ocampo
- Macarena Pescador (17b)
- Melisa Pinter
- Victoria Sauze (20b)
- Mercedes Socino (4b)
- Luciana Soracco
- Mercedes Stornini
- Sol Villar
- Belén Zavalía Lagos

Coach: Carlos Retegui—March

- Laura Aladro (13)
- Carolina Armani ▲
- Luciana Aymar (8)
- Noel Barrionuevo (27)
- Marcela Casale (32)
- Martina Cavallero (14)
- Jimena Cedrés (7)
- Silvina D'Elía (25)
- Natalia del Frari (6)
- Carla Dupuy (9)
- Soledad García (10)
- Eugenia Garraffo (28)
- Rocío González Canda (24)
- Florencia Habif (16)
- Giselle Kañevsky (26)
- Ana López Basavilbaso (23)
- Rosario Luchetti (4)
- Sofía Maccari (19)
- Delfina Merino (12)
- Carla Rebecchi (11)
- Macarena Rodríguez (5)
- Rocío Sánchez Moccia (17)
- Julia Simonassi
- Mariela Scarone (21)
- Daniela Sruoga (18)
- Josefina Sruoga (30)
- Belén Succi (1)
- Roberta Werthein (15) ▲
- Victoria Zuloaga (20)
- Agustina Bouza
- Sofía Cesanelli
- Carla de Berti
- Martina del Cerro
- Belén Facciano
- Natalia Galíndez
- Giselle Juárez
- Gabriela Ludueña
- Valentina Magnone
- Aylín Martínez
- Cristina Martínez
- Eugenia Mastronardi
- Julieta Medici
- Macarena Pescador
- Melisa Pinter
- Victoria Sauze
- Mercedes Socino
- Belén Zavalía Lagos

Coach: Carlos Retegui—December

- Constanza Aguirre (29) ▲
- Laura Aladro (13)
- Agustina Albertario (26) ▲
- Luciana Aymar (8)
- Noel Barrionuevo (27)
- Marcela Casale (32)
- Martina Cavallero (14)
- Jimena Cedrés (7)
- Silvina D'Elía (25)
- Laura del Colle (31) ▲
- Carla Dupuy (9)
- Nahir El Barri ▲
- María José Fernández (6) ▲
- Florencia Habif (16)
- Giselle Juárez (22) ▲
- Rosario Luchetti (4)
- Sofía Maccari (19)
- Delfina Merino (12)
- Macarena Rodríguez (5)
- Rocío Sánchez Moccia (17)
- Mariela Scarone (21)
- Daniela Sruoga (18)
- Josefina Sruoga (30)
- Belén Succi (1)
- Roberta Werthein (15)
2012

Coach: Carlos Retegui—January

- Constanza Aguirre (29)
- Laura Aladro (13)
- Luciana Aymar (8)
- Noel Barrionuevo (27)
- Marcela Casale (32)
- Martina Cavallero (14)
- Jimena Cedrés (6)
- Silvina D'Elía (25)
- Laura del Colle (31)
- Nahir El Barri
- María José Fernández (24)
- Florencia Habif (16)
- Giselle Juárez (22)
- Ana López Basavilbaso (23) ▲
- Rosario Luchetti (4)
- Sofía Maccari (19)
- Delfina Merino (12)
- Agustina Metidieri (3) ▲
- Carla Rebecchi (11)
- Macarena Rodríguez (5)
- Rocío Sánchez Moccia (17)
- Mariela Scarone (21)
- Daniela Sruoga (18)
- Josefina Sruoga (30)
- Belén Succi (1)
- Roberta Werthein (15)

Coach: Carlos Retegui—February

- Luciana Aymar (8)
- Noel Barrionuevo (27)
- Martina Cavallero (7)
- Silvina D'Elía (25)
- Laura del Colle (1)
- María José Fernández (24)
- Julieta Franco (2) ▲
- Florencia Habif (16)
- Rosario Luchetti (4)
- Sofía Maccari (19)
- Mercedes Margalot (14) ▲
- Delfina Merino (12)
- Florencia Mutio (31) ▲
- Carla Rebecchi (11)
- Macarena Rodríguez (5)
- ~~Mariné Russo~~ ▲
- Rocío Sánchez Moccia (17)
- Mariela Scarone (21)
- Daniela Sruoga (18)
- Josefina Sruoga (30)
- Belén Succi (28)
- Roberta Werthein (15)

Coach: Carlos Retegui—June

- Luciana Aymar (8)
- Noel Barrionuevo (27)
- Martina Cavallero (7)
- Jimena Cedrés (6) ▲
- Silvina D'Elía (25)
- Carla de Berti (28B) ▲
- Laura del Colle (1)
- Carla Dupuy (9) ▲
- María José Fernández (24)
- Julieta Franco (2)
- Julia Gomes Fantasia (29) ▲
- Florencia Habif (16)
- Giselle Juárez (22) ▲
- Ana López Basavilbaso (23) ▲
- Rosario Luchetti (4)
- Gabriela Ludueña (26) ▲
- Sofía Maccari (19)
- Mercedes Margalot (14)
- Delfina Merino (12)
- Florencia Mutio (31)
- Carla Rebecchi (11)
- Macarena Rodríguez (5)
- Rocío Sánchez Moccia (17)
- Mariela Scarone (21)
- Daniela Sruoga (18)
- Josefina Sruoga (30)
- Belén Succi (28)
- Roberta Werthein (15)
2013

Coach: Marcelo Garraffo—January

- Luciana Aymar (8)
- Noel Barrionuevo (27)
- Florencia Calvete ▲
- Martina Cavallero (7)
- Sofía Cesanelli (32) ▲
- Silvina D'Elía (25)
- Laura del Colle (1)
- Natalia del Frari (24) ▲
- Ivana Dell'Era (28) ▲
- Carla Dupuy (9)
- Ana López Basavilbaso (23)
- Giselle Juárez (22)
- Rosario Luchetti (4)
- Gabriela Ludueña (26)
- Sofía Maccari (19)
- Delfina Merino (12)
- Florencia Mutio (31)
- Carla Rebecchi (11)
- Macarena Rodríguez (5)
- Rocío Sánchez Moccia (17)
- Mariela Scarone (21)
- Daniela Sruoga (18)
- Josefina Sruoga (30)
- Victoria Zuloaga (20) ▲

Coach: Emanuel Roggero—May

- Laura Aladro (13) ▲
- Agustina Albertario ▲
- Luciana Aymar (8)
- Noel Barrionuevo (27)
- Martina Cavallero (7)
- Sofía Cesanelli (32)
- Silvina D'Elía (25)
- Laura del Colle (1)
- María José Fernández (24) ▲
- Florencia Habif (16) ▲
- Giselle Juárez (22)
- Ana López Basavilbaso (23)
- Rosario Luchetti (4)
- Gabriela Ludueña (26)
- Sofía Maccari (19)
- Delfina Merino (12)
- Florencia Mutio (31)
- Carla Rebecchi (11)
- Macarena Rodríguez (5)
- Rocío Sánchez Moccia (17)
- Mariela Scarone (21)
- Daniela Sruoga (18)
- Josefina Sruoga (30)
- Belén Succi (28) ▲
- Victoria Zuloaga (20)

Coach: Emanuel Roggero—August

- Gabriela Aguirre ▲
- Laura Aladro (13)
- Agustina Albertario (19)
- Luciana Aymar (8)
- Noel Barrionuevo (27)
- Martina Cavallero (7)
- Silvina D'Elía (25)
- Julia Gomes Fantasia (29) ▲
- Agustina Habif (14) ▲
- Florencia Habif (16)
- Giselle Juárez (22)
- Ana López Basavilbaso (23)
- Rosario Luchetti (4)
- Gabriela Ludueña (26)
- Delfina Merino (12)
- Florencia Mutio (31)
- Carla Rebecchi (11)
- Macarena Rodríguez (5)
- Pilar Romang (24) ▲
- Mariana Rossi (2) ▲
- Rocío Sánchez Moccia (17)
- Mariela Scarone (21)
- Daniela Sruoga (18)
- Josefina Sruoga (30)
- Belén Succi (1)
2014

Coach: Carlos Retegui—January

- Laura Aladro (13)
- Agustina Albertario (19)
- Luciana Aymar (8)
- Noel Barrionuevo (27)
- Martina Cavallero (7)
- Sofía Cesanelli (32) ▲
- Silvina D'Elía (25)
- Julia Gomes Fantasia (29)
- Agustina Habif (14)
- Florencia Habif (16)
- Giselle Juárez (22)
- Ana López Basavilbaso (23)
- Rosario Luchetti (4)
- Gabriela Ludueña (26)
- Delfina Merino (12)
- Florencia Mutio (31)
- Ivanna Pessina (15) ▲
- Carla Rebecchi (11)
- Macarena Rodriguez (5)
- Pilar Romang (24)
- Mariana Rossi (2)
- Rocío Sánchez Moccia (17)
- Mariela Scarone (21)
- Daniela Sruoga (18)
- Josefina Sruoga (30)
- Belén Succi (1)
- Antonella Brondello (2b)
- Jimena Cedrés (3)
- Carla Dupuy (9)
- Victoria Sauze (6)

Coach: Santiago Capurro—July

- Laura Aladro (13)
- Agustina Albertario (19)
- Luciana Aymar (8)
- Noel Barrionuevo (27)
- Martina Cavallero (7)
- Jimena Cedrés (6) ▲
- Silvina D'Elía (25)
- Julia Gomes Fantasia (29)
- Agustina Habif (14)
- Florencia Habif (16)
- Giselle Juárez (22)
- Gabriela Koltes ▲
- Rosario Luchetti (4)
- Delfina Merino (12)
- Agustina Metidieri (3) ▲
- Luciana Molina (20) ▲
- Florencia Mutio (31)
- Lara Oviedo (23) ▲
- Carla Rebecchi (11)
- Macarena Rodríguez (5)
- Pilar Romang (24)
- Mariana Rossi (2)
- Rocío Sánchez Moccia (17)
- Mariana Scandura (32) ▲
- Mariela Scarone (21)
- Daniela Sruoga (18)
- Josefina Sruoga (30)
- Belén Succi (1)
- Sofía Villarroya (15) ▲
2015

Coach: Santiago Capurro—January

- Laura Aladro (13)
- Agustina Albertario (19)
- Noel Barrionuevo (27)
- Martina Cavallero (7)
- Jimena Cedrés (6)
- Silvina D'Elía (25)
- Julia Gomes Fantasia (29)
- Agustina Habif (14)
- Florencia Habif (16)
- Giselle Juárez (22)
- ~~Rosario Luchetti~~ (4)
- Julieta Medici (9) ▲
- Delfina Merino (12)
- Agustina Metidieri (3)
- Luciana Molina (20)
- Florencia Mutio (31)
- Lara Oviedo (23)
- Carla Rebecchi (11)
- Macarena Rodríguez (5)
- Pilar Romang (24)
- Rocío Sánchez Moccia (17)
- Mariana Scandura (32)
- Mariela Scarone (21)
- Josefina Sruoga (30)
- Belén Succi (1)
- Sofía Toccalino (2) ▲
- Sofía Villarroya (15)

Coach: Santiago Capurro—August

- Laura Aladro (13)
- Agustina Albertario (19)
- Noel Barrionuevo (27)
- Pilar Campoy (23) ▲
- Martina Cavallero (7)
- Jimena Cedrés (6)
- Ivana Dell'Era (18) ▲
- Carla Dupuy (9) ▲
- Julia Gomes Fantasia (29)
- María José Granatto (15) ▲
- Agustina Habif (14)
- Florencia Habif (16)
- Julieta Jankunas (28) ▲
- Giselle Juárez (22)
- Delfina Merino (12)
- Luciana Molina (20)
- Florencia Mutio (31)
- Paula Ortiz (26) ▲
- Carla Rebecchi (11)
- Pilar Romang (24)
- Rocío Sánchez Moccia (17)
- Mariana Scandura (32)
- ~~Josefina Sruoga~~ (30)
- Belén Succi (1)
- Sofía Toccalino (2)
- Eugenia Trinchinetti (4) ▲
- Victoria Zuloaga (3) ▲

Coach: Gabriel Minadeo—October

- Laura Aladro (13)
- Agustina Albertario (19)
- Noel Barrionuevo (27)
- Claudia Burkart (24) ▲
- Pilar Campoy (23)
- Martina Cavallero (7)
- Jimena Cedrés (6)
- Carla Dupuy (9)
- Julia Gomes Fantasia (29)
- María José Granatto (15)
- Agustina Habif (14)
- Florencia Habif (16)
- Delfina Merino (12)
- Carla Rebecchi (11)
- Pilar Romang (18)
- Rocío Sánchez Moccia (17)
- Belén Succi (1)
- Sofía Toccalino (2)
- Eugenia Trinchinetti (4)
- Victoria Zuloaga (3)

Observed in November:

- Gabriela Aguirre
- Micaela Angelino
- Carolina Azzaro
- Antonella Brondello
- Sofía Darnay
- Florencia de Andreis
- Francesca Giovanelli
- Victoria Granatto
- Ana López Basavilbaso
- Agustina Metidieri
- Sofía Monserrat
- Lara Oviedo
- Antonella Rinaldi
- Victoria Sauze
2016

Coach: Gabriel Minadeo

- Gabriela Aguirre (25) ▲
- ~~Laura Aladro~~ (13)
- Agustina Albertario (19)
- Noel Barrionuevo (27)
- Claudia Burkart (24)
- Pilar Campoy (23)
- Martina Cavallero (7)
- Jimena Cedrés (6)
- Carla Dupuy (9)
- Julia Gomes Fantasia (29)
- María José Granatto (15)
- Agustina Habif (14)
- Florencia Habif (16)
- Julieta Jankunas (28) ▲
- Giselle Juárez (22) ▲
- Delfina Merino (12)
- Florencia Mutio (31) ▲
- Paula Ortiz (26) ▲
- Carla Rebecchi (11)
- Pilar Romang (18)
- Rocío Sánchez Moccia (17)
- Belén Succi (1)
- Sofía Toccalino (2)
- Eugenia Trinchinetti (4)
- Lucina von der Heyde (20) ▲
- Victoria Zuloaga (3)
- Clara Barberi
- Sofía Darnay
- Bárbara Dichiara (2)
- Magdalena Fernández Ladra (10)
- Francesca Giovanelli
- Victoria Granatto
- Catalina Labake
- Lara Oviedo
- Victoria Sauze
- Mercedes Socino
2017

Coach: Gabriel Minadeo—January

- Agustina Albertario (19)
- Agostina Alonso (5) ▲
- Clara Barberi (30) ▲
- Bárbara Dichiara (24) ▲
- Bianca Donati (6) ▲
- Pilar Campoy (23)
- Martina Cavallero (7)
- Magdalena Fernández Ladra (10) ▲
- Milagros Fernández Ladra (21) ▲
- Julia Gomes Fantasia (29)
- Agustina Gorzelany (3) ▲
- María José Granatto (15)
- Agustina Habif (14)
- Florencia Habif (16)
- Julieta Jankunas (28)
- Priscila Jardel (9) ▲
- Giselle Juárez (22)
- Delfina Merino (12)
- Florencia Mutio (31)
- Paula Ortiz (26)
- ~~Carla Rebecchi~~ (11)
- Azul Rossetti (13) ▲
- Rocío Sánchez Moccia (17)
- Victoria Sauze (18) ▲
- Belén Succi (1)
- Sofía Toccalino (2)
- Eugenia Trinchinetti (4)
- Lucina von der Heyde (20)

Coach: Agustín Corradini—May

- Agustina Albertario (19)
- Agostina Alonso (5)
- Clara Barberi (30)
- Noel Barrionuevo (27) ▲
- ~~Silvina D'Elía~~ (25) ▲
- Bárbara Dichiara (24)
- Bianca Donati (6)
- Pilar Campoy (23)
- Martina Cavallero (7)
- Magdalena Fernández Ladra (10)
- Milagros Fernández Ladra (21)
- Julia Gomes Fantasia (29)
- Agustina Gorzelany (3)
- María José Granatto (15)
- Agustina Habif (14)
- Florencia Habif (16)
- Julieta Jankunas (28)
- Priscila Jardel (9)
- Giselle Juárez (22)
- Delfina Merino (12)
- Florencia Mutio (31)
- Paula Ortiz (26)
- Azul Rossetti (13)
- Rocío Sánchez Moccia (17)
- Victoria Sauze (18)
- Belén Succi (1)
- Sofía Toccalino (2)
- Eugenia Trinchinetti (4)
- Lucina von der Heyde (20)

Coach: Agustín Corradini—September

- Agustina Albertario (19)
- Agostina Alonso (5)
- Noel Barrionuevo (27)
- Bárbara Dichiara (24)
- Bianca Donati (6)
- Pilar Campoy (23)
- Martina Cavallero (7)
- Magdalena Fernández Ladra (10)
- Milagros Fernández Ladra (21)
- Julia Gomes Fantasia (29)
- Agustina Gorzelany (3)
- María José Granatto (15)
- Agustina Habif (14)
- Florencia Habif (16)
- Julieta Jankunas (28)
- Priscila Jardel (9)
- Delfina Merino (12)
- Florencia Mutio (31)
- Paula Ortiz (26)
- Azul Rossetti (13)
- Rocío Sánchez Moccia (17)
- Victoria Sauze (18)
- Belén Succi (1)
- Sofía Toccalino (2)
- Eugenia Trinchinetti (4)
- Lucina von der Heyde (20)
- Bárbara Borgia
- Francesca Giovanelli
- Catalina Labake
- Camila Machín
- Maia Pustilnik
- Mariana Scandura
- Delfina Thome Gustavino
2018

Coach: Agustín Corradini—January

- Agustina Albertario (19)
- Agostina Alonso (5)
- Noel Barrionuevo (27)
- Pilar Campoy (23)
- Martina Cavallero (7)
- Bárbara Dichiara (24)
- Bianca Donati (6)
- Magdalena Fernández Ladra (10)
- Milagros Fernández Ladra (21)
- Julia Gomes Fantasia (29)
- Agustina Gorzelany (3)
- María José Granatto (15)
- Agustina Habif (14)
- Florencia Habif (16)
- Julieta Jankunas (28)
- Priscila Jardel (9)
- Delfina Merino (12)
- Florencia Mutio (31)
- Paula Ortiz (26)
- Azul Rossetti (13)
- Rocío Sánchez Moccia (17)
- Victoria Sauze (18)
- Belén Succi (1)
- Sofía Toccalino (2)
- Eugenia Trinchinetti (4)
- Lucina von der Heyde (20)
- Bárbara Borgia (17b)
- Jimena Cedrés
- ~~Celina di Santo~~
- Francesca Giovanelli
- Catalina Labake (11)
- Camila Machín (22)
- ~~Victoria Miranda~~
- ~~Gianella Palet~~
- Maia Pustilnik
- Florencia Saravia
- Mariana Scandura (32)

Added in August:

- Carla Rebecchi (11) ▲
- Abril Vázquez
2019

Coach: Carlos Retegui—January

- Agustina Albertario (19)
- Agostina Alonso (5)
- Agostina Ayala (30) ▲
- ~~Noel Barrionuevo~~ (27)
- Brisa Bruggesser (35) ▲
- Paulina Carrizo ▲
- Cristina Cosentino (13) ▲
- Valentina Costa Biondi (32—played first match with #3) ▲
- Silvina D'Elía (25) ▲
- Celina di Santo (24) ▲
- Bianca Donati (6)
- Magdalena Fernández Ladra
- Milagros Fernández Ladra
- ~~Agustina Gorzelany~~
- María José Granatto (15)
- Victoria Granatto (21) ▲
- Agustina Habif (14)
- Florencia Habif (16)
- Julieta Jankunas (28)
- Priscila Jardel (9)
- Catalina Labake ▲
- Rosario Luchetti (4) ▲
- Delfina Merino (12)
- Victoria Miranda (29) ▲
- Florencia Mutio (31)
- Paula Ortiz (26)
- Carla Rebecchi (11)
- Micaela Retegui (23) ▲
- ~~Rocío Sánchez Moccia~~ (17)
- Victoria Sauze (18)
- Belén Succi (1)
- Sofía Toccalino (2)
- Eugenia Trinchinetti (22)
- Lucina von der Heyde (20)

Added in February:

- Luciana Galimberti
- Victoria Zuloaga (3)

Added in April:

- Juanita Ayerza
- Noel Barrionuevo (27)
- Giselle Kañevsky (7)
- Sol Lombardo (37)
- Daiana Pacheco
- Mariana Scandura (36)

Added in July:

- Valentina Frías

Added in September:

- Constanza Cerundolo (38)
- Agustina Gorzelany (3)
- Sofía Ramallo (34)
- Josefina Rübenacker (33)
- Rocío Sánchez Moccia (17)

Added in October:

- Delfina Thome (39)
2020

Coach: Carlos Retegui—January

- Agustina Albertario (19)
- Agostina Alonso (5)
- Noel Barrionuevo (27)
- Brisa Bruggesser (35)
- Constanza Cerundolo (38)
- Cristina Cosentino (13)
- Valentina Costa Biondi (32)
- Silvina D'Elía (25)
- Celina di Santo (24)
- Bianca Donati (6)
- Agustina Gorzelany (3)
- María José Granatto (15)
- Victoria Granatto (21)
- Julieta Jankunas (28)
- Priscila Jardel (9)
- Giselle Kañevsky (7)
- Rosario Luchetti (4)
- Delfina Merino (12)
- Victoria Miranda (29)
- Sofía Ramallo (34)
- Carla Rebecchi (11)
- Micaela Retegui (23)
- Josefina Rübenacker (33)
- Rocío Sánchez Moccia (17)
- Victoria Sauze (18)
- Mariana Scandura (36)
- Belén Succi (1)
- Delfina Thome (39)
- Sofía Toccalino (2)
- Eugenia Trinchinetti (22)

Added in February:

- Emilia Forcherio (40) ▲

Coach: Carlos Retegui—July

- Agustina Albertario (19)
- Agostina Alonso (5)
- Clara Barberi ▲
- Noel Barrionuevo (27)
- Brisa Bruggesser (35)
- Pilar Campoy ▲
- Jimena Cedrés ▲
- Constanza Cerundolo (38)
- Cristina Cosentino (13)
- Valentina Costa Biondi (32)
- ~~Silvina D'Elía (25)~~
- Celina di Santo (24)
- Bárbara Dichiara ▲
- Emilia Forcherio (40)
- Agustina Gorzelany (3)
- María José Granatto (15)
- Victoria Granatto (21)
- Julieta Jankunas (28)
- ~~Giselle Kañevsky (7)~~
- ~~Rosario Luchetti (4)~~
- Delfina Merino (12)
- Victoria Miranda (29)
- Gianella Palet ▲
- Sofía Ramallo (34)
- ~~Carla Rebecchi (11)~~
- Micaela Retegui (23)
- Josefina Rübenacker (33)
- ~~Rocío Sánchez Moccia (17)~~
- Victoria Sauze (18)
- Mariana Scandura (36)
- Belén Succi (1)
- Delfina Thome (39)
- Sofía Toccalino (2)
- Eugenia Trinchinetti (22)

Added in September:

- Guadalupe Adorno
- Bianca Donati (6) ▲
- Guadalupe Fernández Lacort
- Juliana Guggini ▲
- Sofía Maccari ▲

Added in November:

- Silvina D'Elía (25) ▲
- Inés Delpech ▲
2021

Coach: Carlos Retegui—January

- Agustina Albertario (19)
- Agostina Alonso (5)
- Clara Barberi (14)
- Noel Barrionuevo (27)
- Constanza Cerundolo (38)
- Cristina Cosentino (13)
- Valentina Costa Biondi (32)
- ~~Silvina D'Elía (25)~~
- Celina di Santo (24)
- Inés Delpech (37)
- Bárbara Dichiara (16)
- Bianca Donati (6)
- Emilia Forcherio (40)
- Agustina Gorzelany (3)
- María José Granatto (15)
- Victoria Granatto (21)
- Juliana Guggini (24 -just once-)
- Julieta Jankunas (28)
- ~~Rosario Luchetti (4)~~ ▲
- Sofía Maccari (26)
- Delfina Merino (12)
- Victoria Miranda (29)
- Sol Pagella (43) ▲
- Mariana Pineda (42)
- Valentina Raposo (41) ▲
- Micaela Retegui (23)
- Victoria Sauze (18)
- Mariana Scandura (36)
- Belén Succi (1)
- Delfina Thome (39)
- Sofía Toccalino (2)
- Eugenia Trinchinetti (22)

Added in April:

- Rocío Sánchez Moccia (17) ▲

Added in May:

- Paula Pasquettin

Coach: Fernando Ferrara—November

- Agustina Albertario (7)
- Agostina Alonso (5)
- Clara Barberi (14)
- ~~Noel Barrionuevo~~
- Jimena Cedrés (25) ▲
- Cristina Cosentino (13)
- Valentina Costa Biondi (32)
- Bárbara Dichiara (16)
- Emilia Forcherio (40)
- Agustina Gorzelany (3)
- María José Granatto (10)
- Julieta Jankunas (28)
- Sol Lombardo ▲
- Valentina Marcucci ▲
- Delfina Merino (12)
- Valentina Raposo (20)
- Micaela Retegui (23)
- Rocío Sánchez Moccia (17)
- Victoria Sauze (18)
- Belén Succi (1)
- Delfina Thome (39)
- Sofía Toccalino (2)
- Eugenia Trinchinetti (22)
- Martina Triñanes ▲

Added in December:

- Sofía Cairo ▲
- Celina di Santo (24) ▲
- Daiana Pacheco ▲
2022

Coach: Fernando Ferrara—January

- Agustina Albertario (7)
- Agostina Alonso (5)
- Clara Barberi (14)
- Sofía Cairó (4)
- Jimena Cedrés (25)
- Cristina Cosentino (13)
- Valentina Costa Biondi (32)
- Celina di Santo (24)
- Bárbara Dichiara (16)
- Emilia Forcherio (40)
- Agustina Gorzelany (3)
- María José Granatto (10)
- Julieta Jankunas (28)
- Sol Lombardo (44)
- Valentina Marcucci (31)
- Delfina Merino (9)
- Daiana Pacheco (46)
- Valentina Raposo (20)
- Micaela Retegui (23)
- Rocío Sánchez Moccia (17)
- Victoria Sauze (18)
- Belén Succi (1)
- Delfina Thome (39)
- Sofía Toccalino (2)
- Eugenia Trinchinetti (22)
- Martina Triñanes (30)

Added in February:

- Brisa Bruggesser (35)
- Constanza Cerundolo (38)
- Victoria Granatto (21) ▲
- Victoria Miranda (29)
- Sol Pagella (43)
- Lourdes Pérez Iturraspe (48)
- Mariana Pineda (47)

Coach: Fernando Ferrara—April

- Agustina Albertario (7)
- Agostina Alonso (5)
- Clara Barberi (14)
- Sofía Cairó (4)
- Jimena Cedrés (25)
- Cristina Cosentino (13)
- Valentina Costa Biondi (32)
- Emilia Forcherio (6)
- Agustina Gorzelany (3)
- María José Granatto (10)
- Victoria Granatto (21)
- Julieta Jankunas (28)
- Sol Lombardo (44)
- Valentina Marcucci (31)
- Daiana Pacheco (46)
- Valentina Raposo (20)
- Rocío Sánchez Moccia (17)
- Victoria Sauze (18)
- Belén Succi (1)
- Delfina Thome (39)
- Sofía Toccalino (2)
- Eugenia Trinchinetti (22)

Coach: Fernando Ferrara—September

- Guadalupe Adorno (42) ▲
- Agustina Albertario (7)
- Agostina Alonso (5)
- Catalina Andrade (45) ▲
- Clara Barberi (14)
- Sofía Cairó (20)
- Pilar Campoy (26) ▲
- Jimena Cedrés (25)
- Constanza Cerundolo (38) ▲
- Cristina Cosentino (13)
- Valentina Costa Biondi (32)
- Inés Delpech (37) ▲
- Celina di Santo (24) ▲
- Bárbara Dichiara (16) ▲
- Ana Luz Dodorico (15) ▲
- Bianca Donati (35) ▲
- Juana Fajardo (40) ▲
- Emilia Forcherio (6)
- Magdalena Fernández Ladra (36) ▲
- Milagros Fernández Ladra (41) ▲
- Agustina Gorzelany (3)
- María José Granatto (10)
- Julieta Jankunas (28)
- Sol Lombardo (44)
- Victoria Manuele (19) ▲
- Valentina Marcucci (31)
- Victoria Miranda (29) ▲
- Paula Ortiz (39) ▲
- Daiana Pacheco (46)
- Sol Pagella (43) ▲
- Gianella Palet (33) ▲
- Lourdes Pérez Iturraspe (48) ▲
- Mariana Pineda (47) ▲
- Valentina Raposo (4)
- Rocío Sánchez Moccia (17)
- Lucía Sanguinetti (34) ▲
- Victoria Sauze (18)
- Delfina Thome (11)
- Sofía Toccalino (2)
- Eugenia Trinchinetti (22)
- Martina Triñanes (30) ▲
- Lucina von der Heyde (21) ▲
- Inés Welsh ▲
2023

Coach: Fernando Ferrara

- Guadalupe Adorno (42)
- Agustina Albertario (7)
- Agostina Alonso (5)
- Catalina Andrade (45)
- Clara Barberi (14)
- Sofía Cairó (20)
- Pilar Campoy (26)
- Carolina Carrizo ▲
- Juana Castellaro (50) ▲
- Jimena Cedrés (25)
- Constanza Cerundolo (38)
- Cristina Cosentino (13)
- Valentina Costa Biondi (32)
- Celina di Santo (24)
- Bárbara Dichiara (16)
- Ana Luz Dodorico (15)
- Bianca Donati (35)
- Juana Fajardo (40)
- Agustina Gorzelany (3)
- María José Granatto (10)
- Julieta Jankunas (28)
- Sol Lombardo (44)
- Victoria Manuele (19)
- Valentina Marcucci (31)
- Victoria Miranda (29)
- Paula Ortiz (39)
- Gianella Palet (33)
- Lourdes Pérez Iturraspe (48)
- Alina Piccardo (49) ▲
- Valentina Raposo (4)
- Rocío Sánchez Moccia (17)
- Lucía Sanguinetti (34)
- Victoria Sauze (18)
- Micaela Sirera (41) ▲
- Delfina Thome (11)
- Sofía Toccalino (2)
- Eugenia Trinchinetti (22)
- Lucina von der Heyde (21)

Coach: Fernando Ferrara - July

- Guadalupe Adorno (42)
- Agustina Albertario (7)
- Agostina Alonso (5)
- Catalina Andrade (45)
- Clara Barberi (14)
- Sofía Cairó (20)
- Pilar Campoy (26)
- Carolina Carrizo
- Juana Castellaro (50)
- Cristina Cosentino (13)
- Valentina Costa Biondi (32)
- Celina di Santo (24)
- Bárbara Dichiara (16)
- Ana Luz Dodorico (15)
- Bianca Donati (35)
- Agustina Gorzelany (3)
- María José Granatto (10)
- Julieta Jankunas (28)
- Sol Lombardo (44)
- Victoria Manuele (19)
- Valentina Marcucci (31)
- Victoria Miranda (29)
- Paula Ortiz (39)
- Lourdes Pérez Iturraspe (48)
- Alina Piccardo (49)
- Valentina Raposo (4)
- Rocío Sánchez Moccia (17)
- Victoria Sauze (18)
- Delfina Thome (11)
- Sofía Toccalino (2)
- Eugenia Trinchinetti (22)

Coach: Fernando Ferrara - November

- Guadalupe Adorno (42)
- Agustina Albertario (7)
- Agostina Alonso (5)
- Maitena Altamirano (65) ▲
- Catalina Andrade (45)
- Stefanía Antoniazzi (36) ▲
- Ariana Arias (57) ▲
- Mercedes Artola (51) ▲
- Clara Barberi (14)
- Brisa Bruggesser (60) ▲
- Sofía Cairó (20)
- Pilar Campoy (26)
- Carolina Carrizo (37)
- Lara Casas (61) ▲
- Juana Castellaro (50)
- Cristina Cosentino (13)
- Valentina Costa Biondi (32)
- Celina di Santo (24)
- Zoe Díaz (55) ▲
- Bárbara Dichiara (16)
- Ana Luz Dodorico (15)
- Bianca Donati (35)
- Josefina Esnaola (70) ▲
- Victoria Falasco (63) ▲
- Valentina Ferola (53) ▲
- Agustina Gorzelany (3)
- María José Granatto (10)
- Julieta Jankunas (28)
- Emilia Larsen (59) ▲
- Sol Lombardo (44)
- Victoria Manuele (19)
- Valentina Marcucci (31)
- Victoria Miranda (29)
- Daiana Pacheco (46) ▲
- Sol Pagella (43) ▲
- Pilar Palacio (67) ▲
- Yazmín Pallottini (52) ▲
- Lourdes Pérez Iturraspe (48)
- Delfina Petre (69) ▲
- Alina Piccardo (49)
- Mariana Pineda (47) ▲
- Pilar Pisthon (66) ▲
- Valentina Raposo (4)
- Martina Rosenbrock (56) ▲
- Brisa Ruggeri (58) ▲
- Malena Sabez (64) ▲
- Rocío Sánchez Moccia (17)
- Lucía Sanguinetti (34) ▲
- Victoria Sauze (18)
- Paula Santamarina (54) ▲
- Micaela Sirera (41) ▲
- Catalina Stamati (68) ▲
- Emma Tarquini (62) ▲
- Delfina Thome (11)
- Sofía Toccalino (2)
- Eugenia Trinchinetti (22)
2024

Coach: Fernando Ferrara - January

- Guadalupe Adorno (42)
- Agustina Albertario (7)
- Agostina Alonso (5)
- Catalina Andrade (45)
- Stefanía Antoniazzi (36)
- Clara Barberi (14)
- Sofía Cairó (20)
- Pilar Campoy (26)
- Carolina Carrizo (37)
- Lara Casas (61)
- Juana Castellaro (50)
- Cristina Cosentino (13)
- Valentina Costa Biondi (32)
- Celina di Santo (24)
- Zoe Díaz (55)
- Bárbara Dichiara (16)
- Ana Luz Dodorico (15)
- Bianca Donati (35)
- Agustina Gorzelany (3)
- María José Granatto (10)
- Julieta Jankunas (28)
- Sol Lombardo (44)
- Victoria Manuele (19)
- Valentina Marcucci (31)
- Victoria Miranda (29)
- Lourdes Pérez Iturraspe (48)
- Alina Piccardo (49)
- Valentina Raposo (4)
- Malena Sabez (64)
- Rocío Sánchez Moccia (17)
- Victoria Sauze (18)
- Delfina Thome (11)
- Sofía Toccalino (2)
- Eugenia Trinchinetti (22)

Added in March:

- Aldana Gomis

Coach: Fernando Ferrara - October

- Agustina Albertario (7)
- Catalina Alimenti (34) ▲
- Agostina Alonso (5)
- Victoria Amaya ▲
- Catalina Andrade (45)
- Julieta Arcidiácono (47) ▲
- Brisa Bruggesser (60) ▲
- Sofía Cairó (20)
- Josefina Cannone ▲
- Agustina Capobianco (49) ▲
- Lara Casas (23)
- Juana Castellaro (25)
- Carla Cortez ▲
- Cristina Cosentino (13)
- Valentina Costa Biondi (32)
- María Victoria del Carril ▲
- Celina di Santo (24)
- Zoe Díaz (33)
- Ana Luz Dodorico (15)
- Candela Esandi (41) ▲
- Valentina Ferola (35) ▲
- Aldana Gomis
- Agustina Gorzelany (3)
- María José Granatto (10)
- Julieta Jankunas (28)
- Emilia Larsen (50) ▲
- Jorgelina Maciel ▲
- Victoria Manuele (19)
- Valentina Marcucci (31)
- Victoria Miranda (29)
- Candela Nobile ▲
- Aylín Ovejero ▲
- Lourdes Pérez Iturraspe (48)
- Mariana Pineda ▲
- Valentina Raposo (4)
- Brisa Ruggeri (58) ▲
- Malena Sabez (37)
- Paula Santamarina (30) ▲
- Victoria Sauze (18)
- Sofía Toccalino (2)
- Valentina Torres ▲
- Eugenia Trinchinetti (22)
- Denise Wasinski ▲

Added in November:

- Chiara Ambrosini (38) ▲
- Ariana Arias (39) ▲
- Mercedes Artola (40) ▲
- Victoria Falasco (42) ▲
- Victoria Granatto ▲
- Emma Knobl (43) ▲
- Paula Ortiz ▲
- Lourdes Pisthón (46) ▲
2025

Coach: Fernando Ferrara - January

- Agustina Albertario (7) ▲
- Catalina Alimenti (34)
- Agostina Alonso (5)
- Chiara Ambrosini (38)
- Catalina Andrade (45)
- Stefanía Antoniazzi (36) ▲
- Julieta Arcidiácono (47)
- Ariana Arias (39)
- Mercedes Artola (40)
- Brisa Bruggesser (60)
- Sofía Cairó (20)
- Agustina Capobianco (49)
- Lara Casas (23)
- Juana Castellaro (25)
- Cristina Cosentino (13)
- Valentina Costa Biondi (32)
- ~~Celina di Santo (24)~~ ▲
- Zoe Díaz (33)
- Ana Luz Dodorico (15)
- Victoria Falasco (42)
- Valentina Ferola (35)
- Agustina Gorzelany (3)
- María José Granatto (10)
- Victoria Granatto (21) ▲
- Julieta Jankunas (28)
- Emma Knobl (43)
- Emilia Larsen (50)
- Sol Lombardo (44) ▲
- Victoria Manuele (19) ▲
- Victoria Miranda (29)
- Paula Ortiz (51) ▲
- Lourdes Pisthón (46)
- Valentina Raposo (4)
- Victoria Sauze (18)
- Mariana Scandura (52) ▲
- Sofía Toccalino (2)
- Eugenia Trinchinetti (22)

Added in April:

- Candela Esandi (41) ▲
- Emilia Forcherio (6) ▲
- Aylín Ovejero ▲
- Lourdes Pérez Iturraspe (48) ▲
- Brisa Ruggeri ▲

Coach: Fernando Ferrara - July

- Agostina Alonso (5)
- Chiara Ambrosini (38)
- Catalina Andrade (45)
- Mercedes Artola (40)
- Brisa Bruggesser (60)
- Sofía Cairó (20)
- Lara Casas (23)
- Juana Castellaro (25)
- Cristina Cosentino (13)
- Zoe Díaz (33)
- Victoria Falasco (42)
- Emilia Forcherio (6)
- Agustina Gorzelany (3)
- María José Granatto (10)
- Victoria Granatto (21)
- Julieta Jankunas (28)
- Emma Knobl (43)
- Emilia Larsen (50)
- Victoria Miranda (29)
- Paula Ortiz (51)
- Lourdes Pisthón (46)
- Valentina Raposo (4)
- Victoria Sauze (18)
- Sofía Toccalino (2)
- Eugenia Trinchinetti (22)

Coach: Fernando Ferrara - October

- Catalina Alimenti (34) ▲
- Agostina Alonso (5)
- Chiara Ambrosini (38)
- Catalina Andrade (45)
- Stefanía Antoniazzi (36) ▲
- Ariana Arias (39) ▲
- Julieta Arcidiácono (47) ▲
- Mercedes Artola (40)
- Brisa Bruggesser (60)
- Sofía Cairó (20)
- Lara Casas (23)
- Juana Castellaro (25)
- Cristina Cosentino (13)
- Valentina Costa Biondi (32) ▲
- Zoe Díaz (33)
- Ana Luz Dodorico (15) ▲
- Candela Esandi (41) ▲
- Victoria Falasco (42)
- Valentina Ferola (35) ▲
- Agustina Gorzelany (3)
- María José Granatto (10)
- Victoria Granatto (21)
- Julieta Jankunas (28)
- Emma Knobl (43)
- Emilia Larsen (50)
- Sol Lombardo (44) ▲
- Victoria Miranda (29)
- Paula Ortiz (51)
- Aylín Ovejero (52) ▲
- Lourdes Pérez Iturraspe (48) ▲
- Lourdes Pisthón (46)
- Valentina Raposo (4)
- Brisa Ruggeri (53) ▲
- Paula Santamarina (30) ▲
- Victoria Sauze (18)
- Sofía Toccalino (2)
- Eugenia Trinchinetti (22)
2026

Coach: Fernando Ferrara - January

- Milagros Alastra (64) ▲
- Agostina Alonso (5)
- Chiara Ambrosini (38)
- Stefanía Antoniazzi (36)
- Mercedes Artola (40)
- Brisa Bruggesser (60)
- Sofía Cairó (20)
- Lara Casas (23)
- Juana Castellaro (25)
- Cristina Cosentino (13)
- Valentina Costa Biondi (32)
- Zoe Díaz (33)
- Ana Luz Dodorico (15)
- Victoria Falasco (42)
- Valentina Ferola (35)
- Agustina Gorzelany (3)
- María José Granatto (10)
- Victoria Granatto (21)
- Sol Guignet (49) ▲
- Julieta Jankunas (28)
- Emma Knobl (43)
- Victoria Miranda (29)
- Sol Olalla (54) ▲
- Paula Ortiz (51)
- Lourdes Pisthón (46)
- Pilar Pisthón (55) ▲
- Valentina Raposo (4)
- Paula Santamarina (30)
- Victoria Sauze (18)
- Catalina Stamati (56) ▲
- Sofía Toccalino (2)
- Eugenia Trinchinetti (22)

Coach: Fernando Ferrara - February

- Milagros Alastra (64)
- Agostina Alonso (5)
- Chiara Ambrosini (38)
- Catalina Andrade (45) ▲
- Stefanía Antoniazzi (36)
- Mercedes Artola (40)
- Brisa Bruggesser (60)
- Sofía Cairó (20)
- Lara Casas (23)
- Juana Castellaro (25)
- Cristina Cosentino (13)
- Valentina Costa Biondi (32)
- Zoe Díaz (33)
- Ana Luz Dodorico (15)
- Candela Esandi (41) ▲
- Victoria Falasco (42)
- Valentina Ferola (35)
- Agustina Gorzelany (3)
- María José Granatto (10)
- Victoria Granatto (21)
- Sol Guignet (49)
- Julieta Jankunas (28)
- Emma Knobl (43)
- Emilia Larsen (50) ▲
- Sol Lombardo (44) ▲
- Victoria Miranda (29)
- Sol Olalla (54)
- Paula Ortiz (51)
- Lourdes Pisthón (46)
- Pilar Pisthón (55)
- Valentina Raposo (4)
- Paula Santamarina (30)
- Victoria Sauze (18)
- Catalina Stamati (56)
- Sofía Toccalino (2)
- Eugenia Trinchinetti (22)

Coach: Fernando Ferrara and Juan Martín López - July

- Milagros Alastra (64)
- Chiara Ambrosini (38)
- Catalina Andrade (45)
- Mercedes Artola (40)
- Rocío Bianchi ▲
- Brisa Bruggesser (60)
- Sofía Cairó (20)
- Lara Casas (23)
- Juana Castellaro (25)
- Sol di Fonzo ▲
- Milagros di Santo ▲
- Zoe Díaz (33)
- Ana Luz Dodorico (15)
- Máxima Duportal ▲
- Victoria Falasco (42)
- Valentina Ferola (35)
- Sol Guignet (49)
- Emma Knobl (43)
- Emilia Larsen (50)
- Delfina Lazcano ▲
- Anezka Mauro ▲
- Delfina Mussari ▲
- Daiana Pacheco ▲
- Sol Pagella ▲
- Pilar Palacio ▲
- Luciana Peralta ▲
- Delfina Persoglia ▲
- Lourdes Pisthón (46)
- Pilar Pisthón (55)
- Manuela Raimondo ▲
- Bárbara Raposo ▲
- Paula Santamarina (30)
- Catalina Stamati (56)
- Brisa Ruggeri (52)

Coach: Fernando Ferrara - October

- Milagros Alastra (64)
- Agostina Alonso (5)
- Chiara Ambrosini (38)
- Catalina Andrade (45)
- Mercedes Artola (40)
- Rocío Bianchi
- Brisa Bruggesser (60)
- Sofía Cairó (20)
- Lara Casas (23)
- Juana Castellaro (25)
- Cristina Cosentino (13)
- Zoe Díaz (33)
- Ana Luz Dodorico (15)
- Máxima Duportal
- Victoria Falasco (42)
- Agustina Gorzelany (3)
- María José Granatto (10)
- Victoria Granatto (21)
- Juliana Guggini ▲
- Sol Guignet (49)
- Julieta Jankunas (28)
- Emma Knobl (43)
- Sol Lombardo (44)
- Victoria Miranda (29)
- Sol Pagella
- Pilar Palacio (36)
- Delfina Persoglia
- Paula Ortiz (51)
- Lourdes Pisthón (46)
- Pilar Pisthón (55)
- Valentina Raposo (4)
- Paula Santamarina (30)
- Victoria Sauze (18)
- Catalina Stamati (56)
- Sofía Toccalino (2)
- Eugenia Trinchinetti (22)

Added in November:

- Milagros di Santo ▲
- Trinidad Holmgren ▲

^1: Players overlined were initially called-up but quit or got retired before any competition of that year.
^2: Players in italic are part of a projection group or invitational.

== Squad records by Olympic cycles in official competitions ==
Records until Sydney 2000

As regards Olympic's hockey competition, Argentina participated in 1988 and in every edition since 1996.

There are no records of the squads for the World Cup from 1974 until 1990, except for the 1983 edition. Argentina participated in all the editions of the competition.

| Jersey # | Competitions | | | | | | | | | | | |
| Jersey # | 1983 WC | 1988 OG | 1991 PAG | 1994 WC | 1995 PAG | 1995 CT | 1996 OG | 1998 WC | 1999 CT | 1999 PAG | 2000 CT | 2000 OG |
|---|---|---|---|---|---|---|---|---|---|---|---|---|
| 1 | Mulhall | | | Arnal | | | | Mulhall | Antoniska | | | |
| 2 | Colombo | | Carbó | MacKenzie | | | | | García | | | |
| 3 | Campbell | López | Budnik | López | | | Aicega | | | | | |
| 4 | Tucat | | Gambero | Fragner | Corvalán | | | Gulla | Corvalán | | Ferrari | |
| 5 | Rasma | Carbó | López | Gambero | | | | | | | | |
| 6 | Medici | Richezza | Pazos | Almada | Castellán | | | Stepnik | | | | |
| 7 | Ciaulandi | Liz | | Pando | | | | Liz | Hernández | Gulla | | Arrondo |
| 8 | Alfonso | Sánchez | Rimoldi | Sánchez | | | | Pando | Aymar | | | |
| 9 | Belmonte | Brinnand | Masotta | Oneto | | | | | Gulla | Oneto | | |
| 10 | Galleriano | Hussey | Castelli | Rimoldi | | | | | | | | |
| 11 | Liz | Palma | Richezza | Masotta | | | | | | | | |
| 12 | Brida | Ormaechea | Ferrari | Castelli | | | | González Oliva | | | González Oliva | Vukojicic |
| 13 | López | Bengochea | Almada | Perrone | | Artica | | Antoniska | Vukojicic | | Maiztegui | |
| 14 | Carbó | Vergara | MacKenzie | Ferrari | Almada | | Rognoni | Margalot | | | | |
| 15 | Sánchez | Pazos | Oneto | Castellán | Aicega | | Stepnik | Aymar | Morello | Hernández | | |
| 16 | Carello | Fioroni | Artica | Aicega | Camardón | | González Oliva | Rognoni | | | Arrondo | Rognoni |
| 17 | | | | | | | | | Haines | | Haines | |
| 18 | | | | | | | | | Arrondo | | Vukojicic | |
| HC | ??? | Miguel MacCormik | Gustavo Paolucci | Rodolfo Mendoza | | | | Sergio Vigil | | | | |
| Result | 9th | 7th | 1st place, gold medalist(s) | 2nd place, silver medalist(s) | 1st place, gold medalist(s) | 6th | 7th | 4th | 4th | 1st place, gold medalist(s) | 4th | 2nd place, silver medalist(s) |

Athens 2004

| Jersey # | Competitions | | | | | | | |
| Jersey # | 2001 | | 2002 | | 2003 | | 2004 | |
| Jersey # | PAC | CT | CT | WC | PAG | CT | PAC | OG |
|---|---|---|---|---|---|---|---|---|
| 1 | Antoniska | | | | | | | Antoniska |
| 2 | García | | García | | | | | |
| 3 | Aicega | | | | | | | |
| 4 | | Arrondo | Ferrari | | | | | |
| 5 | | Gambero | | | di Giacomo | | | |
| 6 | | Stepnik | | | | | | |
| 7 | Gulla | | | | Gulla | | | |
| 8 | Aymar | | | | | | | |
| 9 | Oneto | | | | | | Oneto | |
| 10 | | Rimoldi | | | García | | | |
| 11 | Masotta | | | | del Carril | | | |
| 12 | González Oliva | | | | | | | |
| 13 | Maiztegui | | | | | | | |
| 14 | Margalot | | | | | | | |
| 15 | Hernández | | | | | | | |
| 16 | Rognoni | | | | | | | Rognoni |
| 17 | | | | Parodi | | Parodi | | |
| 18 | | Vukojicic | | | | Vukojicic | | |
| 19 | Russo | | | | | Russo | | |
| 21 | | | Arrondo | | | Arrondo | | |
| 22 | Balbiani | | | | Cattaneo | | Cattaneo | |
| 23 | Doreski | | | Doreski | | | | |
| 24 | Burkart | | | | | | | |
| 25 | Baetti | | | | | | | |
| 26 | Alonso | | | | | | | |
| HC | Sergio Vigil | | | | | | | |
| Result | 1st place, gold medalist(s) | | 2nd place, silver medalist(s) | 1st place, gold medalist(s) | | 4th | 1st place, gold medalist(s) | 3rd place, bronze medalist(s) |

Beijing 2008

| Jersey # | Competitions | | | | | | | | |
| Jersey # | 2004 | 2005 | 2006 | | | 2007 | | 2008 | |
| Jersey # | CT | CT | CT | WC | SAG | CT | PAG | CT | OG |
|---|---|---|---|---|---|---|---|---|---|
| 1 | Antoniska | | Antoniska | | | | Succi | | |
| 2 | | Bianchini | | | Bianchini | | | | |
| 3 | Aicega | | | | | Aicega | | | |
| 4 | Ferrari | Luchetti | | | | | | | |
| 5 | | | | | Pallitto | | | | |
| 6 | Stepnik | | | | | | | | |
| 7 | Gulla | | | | | | Gulla | | |
| 8 | Aymar | | | | | Aymar | | | |
| 9 | Oneto | Rodríguez | | Bouza | | | | | |
| 10 | García | | | | | García | | García | |
| 11 | | | Rebecchi | | | | | | |
| 12 | González Oliva | | | | | González Oliva | | | |
| 13 | | Aladro | | | Aladro | | | | |
| 14 | Margalot | | | | | | Margalot | | |
| 15 | Hernández | | | | | | | Hernández | |
| 16 | Rognoni | | | | | Maloberti | | Rossi | |
| 17 | | D'Elía F. | | | | | | | |
| 18 | | Vukojicic | | | | Vukojicic | | | |
| 19 | Russo | | | | | Russo | | | |
| 20 | Rebecchi | | | | Silva | | | | |
| 21 | Arrondo | | | | | | | | |
| 22 | Cattaneo | | Aguirre | | | | | | |
| 23 | Doreski | | | | | | | | |
| 24 | Burkart | | | | | Burkart | | | |
| 25 | | | Bouza | | D'Elía S. | | | D'Elía S. | |
| 26 | | | | Kañevsky | | | | | Kañevsky |
| 27 | | | | | Barrionuevo | | | | |
| 28 | | | | | Succi | | | | |
| 29 | | | | | Maloberti | Rivas | | | |
| 30 | | | | | Román | | | | |
| 31 | | | | | Rubin | | | | |
| 32 | | | | | Rojas | | | | |
| HC | Sergio Vigil | Gabriel Minadeo | | | | | | | |
| Result | 3rd place, bronze medalist(s) | 4th | | 3rd place, bronze medalist(s) | 1st place, gold medalist(s) | 2nd place, silver medalist(s) | 1st place, gold medalist(s) | | 3rd place, bronze medalist(s) |

London 2012

| Jersey # | Competitions | | | | | | | | |
| Jersey # | 2009 | | 2010 | | | 2011 | | 2012 | |
| Jersey # | PAC | CT | SAC | CT | WC | CT | PAG | CT | OG |
|---|---|---|---|---|---|---|---|---|---|
| 1 | Succi | | | Succi | | | | | del Colle |
| 2 | Merino | | | Rossi | | | | | |
| 4 | Luchetti | | | Luchetti | | | | | |
| 5 | Sánchez Moccia | | Parral | Rodríguez | | | | | |
| 6 | Parral | | Socino | | | | | | |
| 7 | | Gulla | | Gulla | | | | | Cavallero |
| 8 | | Aymar | Cavallero | Aymar | | | | | |
| 9 | Rojas | Dupuy | | | | | | | |
| 10 | | García | | García | | | | | |
| 11 | Rebecchi | | Lozzia | Rebecchi | | | | | |
| 12 | | Ubeira | | Merino | | | | | |
| 13 | Aladro | | | | | | | | |
| 14 | | | Medici | | Vatteone | | | Cavallero | |
| 15 | Abente | | Abente | | | | | Werthein | |
| 16 | | | Soracco | | | Habif | | Habif | |
| 17 | Villalba | | Campoy | | | Sánchez Moccia | | | |
| 18 | Sruoga D. | | | Sruoga D. | | | | | |
| 19 | | Russo | | | | Maccari | | | |
| 20 | Zuloaga | | Zuloaga | | | Zuloaga | | | |
| 21 | Arrondo | Scarone | Fernández | Scarone | | | | | |
| 22 | Aguirre | | Segura | | | | | | |
| 23 | Dell'Era | | González Canda | | | | | | |
| 24 | | Burkart | | | | | | Fernández | |
| 25 | D'Elía | | | D'Elía | | | | | |
| 26 | Kañevsky | | | Kañevsky | | | | | |
| 27 | Barrionuevo | | | Barrionuevo | | | | | |
| 29 | | | Zavalía | | | | | | |
| 30 | | Sruoga J. | | Sruoga J. | | Sruoga J. | | | |
| 31 | | | Méjico | | | | | del Colle | Mutio |
| HC | Gabriel Minadeo | Carlos Retegui | Santiago Capurro | Carlos Retegui | | | | | |
| Result | 1st place, gold medalist(s) | | | | | 2nd place, silver medalist(s) | | 1st place, gold medalist(s) | 2nd place, silver medalist(s) |

Rio 2016

| Jersey # | Competitions | | | | | | | | | | | |
| Jersey # | 2013 | | | | 2014 | | | 2015 | | | 2016 | |
| Jersey # | SAC | WLS | PAC | WLF | SAG | WC | CT | WLS | PAG | WLF | CT | OG |
|---|---|---|---|---|---|---|---|---|---|---|---|---|
| 1 | Brondello | | | | | Succi | | | | | | |
| 2 | Gomes Fantasia | | Rossi | | Brondello | Rossi | | Toccalino | | Toccalino | | |
| 3 | Metidieri | | | | Cedrés | | | | | Zuloaga | | |
| 4 | López Basavilbaso | Luchetti | | | | Luchetti | | | | | | |
| 5 | Cedrés | Rodríguez | | | | Rodríguez | | | | | | |
| 6 | Cabut | | | | Sauze | | Cedrés | | | | | |
| 7 | Albertario | Cavallero | | | | | | | | | | |
| 8 | Fernández | Aymar | | | | Aymar | | | | | | |
| 9 | Romang | | | | Dupuy | | | | | Dupuy | | |
| 10 | Habif A. | | | | | | | | | | | |
| 11 | Granatto | Rebecchi | | | | Rebecchi | | | | Rebecchi | | |
| 12 | Mangone | Merino | | Merino | | | Merino | | | | | |
| 13 | Zuloaga | Aladro | | | Aladro | | Aladro | | | Aladro | | |
| 14 | Villar | | | | Habif A. | | Habif A. | | | | | |
| 15 | Juárez | | | | Pessina | | | | | Granatto | | |
| 16 | Villarroya | Habif F. | | | | | | | | | | |
| 17 | Molina | Sánchez Moccia | | | | Sánchez Moccia | | | | | | |
| 18 | Fernández Ladra | Sruoga D. | | | | Sruoga D. | | | | Romang | | |
| 19 | | Maccari | Albertario | | | | | Albertario | | | | Albertario |
| 20 | | | | | | | | Molina | | | von der Heyde | |
| 21 | | Scarone | | | | Scarone | | | | | | |
| 22 | | Juárez | | | Juárez | | | | | | | |
| 23 | | | | | López Basavilbaso | | | | | Campoy | | |
| 24 | | Fernández | Romang | | Romang | | Romang | | | | | |
| 25 | | D'Elía | | | | D'Elía | | | | | Aguirre | |
| 26 | | Ludueña | | | Ludueña | | | Ortiz | | | | |
| 27 | | Barrionuevo | | | | | | | | | | |
| 28 | | | Succi | | | | | | | | | |
| 29 | | | Gomes Fantasia | | | | Gomes Fantasia | | | | | |
| 30 | | Sruoga J. | | Sruoga J. | | Sruoga J. | | | | | | |
| 31 | | Mutio | | | | Mutio | | Mutio | | | Mutio | |
| 32 | | | | | Cesanelli | | | | | | | |
| HC | Santiago Capurro | Emanuel Roggero | | | Carlos Retegui | | Santiago Capurro | | | Gabriel Minadeo | | |
| Result | 1st place, gold medalist(s) | Adv | 1st place, gold medalist(s) | 4th | 1st place, gold medalist(s) | 3rd place, bronze medalist(s) | 1st place, gold medalist(s) | Adv | 2nd place, silver medalist(s) | 1st place, gold medalist(s) | | 7th |

Tokyo 2020

| Jersey # | Competitions | | | | | | | | | |
| Jersey # | 2017 | | | 2018 | | | 2019 | | 2020 | 2021 |
| Jersey # | WLS | PAC | WLF | SAG | WC | CT | PL | PAG | PL | OG |
|---|---|---|---|---|---|---|---|---|---|---|
| 1 | Succi | | | | Succi | | | | | |
| 2 | | | | Toccalino | | Toccalino | | | | |
| 3 | Gorzelany | | | Gorzelany | | Gorzelany | Zuloaga | | Gorzelany | |
| 4 | Trinchinetti | | | | Trinchinetti | | Luchetti | | | Raposo |
| 5 | Alonso | | | | | | | | | |
| 6 | | | Donati | | Donati | | | | | |
| 7 | Cavallero | | | | Cavallero | | | Kañevsky | | Albertario |
| 9 | | | | Jardel | | | Jardel | | Jardel | |
| 10 | F. Ladra Ma. | | | | | | | | | Granatto M. |
| 11 | | | | Labake | | | Rebecchi | | | |
| 12 | Merino | | | | Merino | | | | Merino | |
| 13 | | | | Rossetti | | | Cosentino | | Cosentino | |
| 14 | Habif A. | | | | Habif A. | | | | Barberi | |
| 15 | Granatto M. | | | | Granatto M. | | | | | |
| 16 | Habif F. | | | | Habif F. | | | | Dichiara | |
| 17 | Sánchez Moccia | | | Borgia | Sánchez Moccia | | | | Sánchez Moccia | |
| 18 | | | Sauze | | | Sauze | | | | |
| 19 | | | Albertario | | | | Albertario | | | |
| 20 | von der Heyde | | | | von der Heyde | | | | | |
| 21 | | | F. Ladra Mi. | | | F. Ladra Mi. | Granatto V. | | | |
| 22 | | | | Machín | | | Trinchinetti | | | |
| 23 | Campoy | | | Campoy | | | Retegui | | | |
| 24 | | | | Dichiara | | | di Santo | | | Forcherio |
| 25 | | | | | | | D'Elía | | | |
| 26 | Ortiz | | | | Ortiz | | | | Maccari | |
| 27 | Barrionuevo | | | | Barrionuevo | | | Barrionuevo | | |
| 28 | Jankunas | | | Jankunas | | | | | | |
| 29 | Gomes Fantasia | | | | Gomes Fantasia | | Miranda | | Miranda | |
| 31 | Mutio | | | | Mutio | | | | | |
| 32 | | | | Scandura | | | Costa Biondi | | | |
| 38 | | | | | | | | | Cerundolo | |
| 39 | | | | | | | | | Thome | |
| 40 | | | | | | | | | Forcherio | |
| 41 | | | | | | | | | Raposo | |
| HC | Agustín Corradini | | | | | | Carlos Retegui | | | |
| Result | Adv | 1st place, gold medalist(s) | 5th | 1st place, gold medalist(s) | 7th | 3rd place, bronze medalist(s) | 4th | 1st place, gold medalist(s) | 2nd place, silver medalist(s) | |

Paris 2024

| Jersey # | Competitions | | | | | | | |
| Jersey # | 2022 | | | | 2023 | | 2024 | |
| Jersey # | PAC | PL | WC | SAG | PL | PAG | PL | OG |
|---|---|---|---|---|---|---|---|---|
| 1 | Succi | | | | | | | |
| 2 | Toccalino | | | | | | | |
| 3 | Gorzelany | | | | Gorzelany | | | |
| 4 | | Cairó | Raposo | | Raposo | | | |
| 5 | Alonso | | | | Alonso | | | |
| 6 | | | Forcherio | | | | | |
| 7 | Albertario | | | | Albertario | | Albertario | |
| 9 | | Merino | | | | | | |
| 10 | Granatto M. | | | | Granatto M. | | | |
| 11 | | | | | Thome | | | |
| 13 | | Cosentino | | | Cosentino | | | |
| 14 | Barberi | | | | | | | |
| 15 | | | | Dodorico | | | | |
| 16 | Dichiara | | | | Dichiara | | Dichiara | |
| 17 | Sánchez Moccia | | | | | | | |
| 18 | Sauze | | | | Sauze | | | |
| 19 | | | | | | | Manuele | |
| 20 | Raposo | | | Cairó | | | | |
| 21 | | Granatto V. | | | von der Heyde | | | |
| 22 | Trinchinetti | | | | | | | |
| 23 | Retegui | | | | | | | Casas |
| 24 | di Santo | | | | | | di Santo | |
| 25 | Cedrés | | | | Cedrés | | | Castellaro |
| 26 | | | | | Campoy | | | |
| 28 | Jankunas | | | | Jankunas | | | |
| 29 | | | | | | | Miranda | |
| 30 | | Triñanes | | Triñanes | | | | |
| 31 | | Marcucci | | | | | Marcucci | |
| 32 | Costa Biondi | | | | Costa Biondi | | | |
| 33 | | | | Palet | | | | Díaz |
| 34 | | | | Sanguinetti | | | | |
| 35 | | | | | Donati | | Donati | |
| 36 | | | | | F. Ladra Ma. | | Antoniazzi | |
| 37 | | | | Delpech | | | Carrizo | |
| 38 | | | | | Cerundolo | | | |
| 39 | Thome | | | | Ortiz | | | |
| 40 | | Forcherio | | | | | | |
| 41 | | | | | F. Ladra Mi. | | | |
| 42 | | | | Adorno | | | | |
| 44 | | Lombardo | | Lombardo | | | | |
| 45 | | | | Andrade | | | Andrade | |
| 46 | | Pacheco | | | | | | |
| 49 | | | | | Piccardo | | Piccardo | |
| 50 | | | | | Castellaro | | | |
| 55 | | | | | | | Díaz | |
| 61 | | | | | | | Casas | |
| HC | Fernando Ferrara | | | | | | | |
| Result | 1st place, gold medalist(s) | | 2nd place, silver medalist(s) | | | 1st place, gold medalist(s) | 3rd place, bronze medalist(s) | |

=== Los Angeles 2028 ===
| Jersey # | Competitions | | | | | | |
| Jersey # | 2025 | | 2026 | | | 2027 | |
| Jersey # | PL | PAC | PL | WC | SAG | PL | PAG |
|---|---|---|---|---|---|---|---|
| 2 | Toccalino | | | | | Toccalino | |
| 3 | Gorzelany | | | | | Gorzelany | |
| 4 | Raposo | | | | | Raposo | |
| 5 | Alonso | | | | | Alonso | |
| 6 | Forcherio | | | | | | |
| 7 | Albertario | | | | | Pisthón L. | |
| 10 | Granatto M. | | | | | Granatto M. | |
| 11 | | | | | | Bruggesser | |
| 13 | Cosentino | | | | | Cosentino | |
| 14 | | | | | | Falasco | |
| 15 | | | | | | Dodorico | |
| 18 | Sauze | | Sauze | | | Sauze | |
| 20 | Cairó | | | | | | |
| 21 | Granatto V. | | | | | Granatto V. | |
| 22 | Trinchinetti | | | | | Trinchinetti | |
| 23 | Casas | | Casas | | | | |
| 24 | | | | | | Lombardo | |
| 25 | Castellaro | | | | | Castellaro | |
| 26 | | | | Ortiz | Pagella | Ortiz | |
| 27 | | | | | | Pagella | |
| 28 | Jankunas | | | | Pacheco | Jankunas | |
| 29 | Miranda | | | | | Miranda | |
| 30 | Santamarina | | | | | Santamarina | |
| 31 | Marcucci | | | | | | |
| 32 | Costa Biondi | | Costa Biondi | | | Artola | |
| 33 | Díaz | | | | | | |
| 34 | Alimenti | | Alimenti | | | | |
| 35 | Ferola | | Ferola | | | Bianchi | |
| 36 | Antoniazzi | | | | Palacio | | |
| 38 | Ambrosini | | | | Ambrosini | | |
| 40 | Artola | | | | | di Santo | |
| 41 | | | Esandi | | | Duportal | |
| 42 | Falasco | | | | Falasco | Guggini | |
| 43 | Knobl | | | | | | |
| 44 | Lombardo | | Lombardo | | | Holmgren | |
| 45 | Andrade | | Andrade | | Andrade | | |
| 46 | Pisthón L. | | Pisthón L. | | Pisthón L. | Persoglia | |
| 47 | Arcidiácono | | Arcidiácono | | | Palacio | |
| 49 | | | | | Guignet | | |
| 50 | Larsen | | Larsen | | | | |
| 51 | Ortiz | | | | | | |
| 52 | | | Ovejero | | | | |
| 55 | | | | | Pisthón P. | | |
| 60 | Bruggesser | | | | | | |
| 64 | | | Alastra | | | | |
| HC | Fernando Ferrara | | | | Juan López | Fernando Ferrara | |
| Result | 2nd place, silver medalist(s) | 1st place, gold medalist(s) | 2nd place, silver medalist(s) | 1st place, gold medalist(s) | | Qualified | |

Current player

== Medal table ==
Below are included titles and awards earned in the following competitions: World Cup, World League, Pro League, Olympics, Champions Trophy, Pan American Games and Pan American Cup.

| No. | Player | Medals | 1st place, gold medalist(s) | 2nd place, silver medalist(s) | 3rd place, bronze medalist(s) | Caps | Debut | Last |
|---|---|---|---|---|---|---|---|---|
| 1 | Belén Succi | 26 | 15 | 8 | 3 | 269 | January 18, 2007 v. Japan, at 2007 CT | July 17, 2022 v. Netherlands, at 2022 WC |
| 2 | Luciana Aymar | 25 | 14 | 6 | 5 | 376 | May 20, 1998 v. South Korea, at 1998 WC | December 7, 2014 v. Australia, at 2014 CT |
| 3 | Noel Barrionuevo | 22 | 13 | 7 | 2 | 345 | January 13, 2007 v. Germany, at 2007 CT | August 6, 2021, v. Netherlands, at 2021 OG |
| 4 | Rocío Sánchez Moccia | 22 | 10 | 8 | 4 | 328 | February 7, 2009 v. Trinidad and Tobago, at 2009 PAC | August 9, 2024 v. Belgium, at 2024 OG |
| 5 | Carla Rebecchi | 21 | 12 | 5 | 4 | 317 | November 9, 2004 v. Australia, at 2004 CT | February 16, 2020 v. Netherlands, at 2020 PL |
| 6 | Delfina Merino | 19 | 11 | 6 | 2 | 306 | February 7, 2009 v. Trinidad and Tobago, at 2009 PAC | April 17, 2022, v. United States, at 2022 PL |
| 7 | Rosario Luchetti | 18 | 11 | 4 | 3 | 290 | November 26, 2005 v. Netherlands, at 2005 CT | February 16, 2020, v. Netherlands, at 2020 PL |
| 8 | María José Granatto | 18 | 9 | 6 | 3 | 261 | January 26, 2013 v. Peru, at 2013 SAC | Still active |
| 9 | Soledad García | 18 | 9 | 5 | 4 | 231 | June 10, 1999 v. Netherlands, at 1999 CT | October 28, 2011 v. United States, at 2011 PAG |
| 10 | Claudia Burkart | 16 | 10 | 2 | 4 | 113 | March 9, 2001 v. Venezuela, at 2001 PAC | November 28, 2015 v. Great Britain |
| 11 | Magdalena Aicega | 16 | 8 | 4 | 4 | 300 | March 9, 1994 v. South Korea, at 1994 WC | August 22, 2008 v. Germany, at 2008 OG |
| 12 | Eugenia Trinchinetti | 16 | 7 | 6 | 3 | 229 | October 3, 2015 v. New Zealand | Still active |
| 13 | Sofía Toccalino | 16 | 7 | 6 | 3 | 221 | February 13, 2015 v. United States | Still active |
| 14 | Julieta Jankunas | 16 | 7 | 6 | 3 | 219 | October 3, 2015 v. New Zealand | Still active |
| 15 | Agostina Alonso | 16 | 7 | 6 | 3 | 204 | February 14, 2017 v. New Zealand | Still active |

=== Individual awards ===
- FIH Player of the Year Award
  - Luciana Aymar (8): 2001, 2004, 2005, 2007, 2008, 2009, 2010, 2013
  - Sofía Cairó (1): 2026
  - Delfina Merino (1): 2017
  - Cecilia Rognoni (1): 2002
- FIH Goalkeeper of the Year Award
  - Cristina Cosentino (1): 2026
- FIH Raising Star Award
  - Zoe Díaz (2): 2024, 2026
  - Soledad García (2): 2002, 2004
  - María José Granatto (2): 2016, 2017
  - Milagros Alastra (1): 2025
  - Florencia Habif (1): 2014
  - Lucina von der Heyde (1): 2018
- World Cup Awards
  - Player of the tournament: Luciana Aymar (2002, 2010), María José Granatto (2022)
  - Goalkeeper of the tournament: Laura Mulhall (1998), Belén Succi (2022)
  - Top Goalscorer: Agustina Gorzelany (2022)
  - Young player of the tournament: Carla Rebecchi (2006), Florencia Habif (2014), Lucina von der Heyde (2018), Zoe Díaz (2026)
- Panamerican Cup Awards
  - Player of the tournament: Luciana Aymar (2004, 2013), Carla Rebecchi (2009), María José Granatto (2022)
  - Top Goalscorer: Cecilia Rognoni (2001), Vanina Oneto (2004), Noel Barrionuevo (2009, 2017), Carla Rebecchi (2013), Agustina Gorzelany (2025)
  - Young player of the tournament: Paula Ortiz (2017)
- Pro League Awards
  - Player of the match:
    - 2019: Carla Rebecchi (2), Rosario Luchetti (2), Sofía Toccalino, Silvina D'Elía, Julieta Jankunas
    - 2020-21: Julieta Jankunas (3), Carla Rebecchi, Agustina Albertario (2)
    - 2021-22: Agustina Albertario, María José Granatto (3), Eugenia Trinchinetti (4), Valentina Costa Biondi, Victoria Granatto (2), Agustina Gorzelany, Belén Succi
    - 2022-23: Eugenia Trinchinetti, Rocío Sánchez Moccia (3), María José Granatto (2), Agostina Alonso, Sofía Toccalino, Agustina Albertario
    - 2023-24: Clara Barberi, Agostina Alonso (3), Eugenia Trinchinetti (4), María José Granatto (2)
    - 2024-25: Julieta Jankunas (2), Sofía Cairó (2), Eugenia Trinchinetti, Zoe Díaz, María José Granatto, Victoria Miranda, Agostina Alonso, Agustina Gorzelany, Victoria Falasco
    - 2025-26: Cristina Cosentino, Sofía Cairó (3), Agustina Gorzelany (3), Agostina Alonso, Lourdes Pisthón, Victoria Granatto, Eugenia Trinchinetti
  - Goal of the grand final: Micaela Retegui (2019)
  - Top Goalscorer: Agustina Gorzelany (2021–22)
- Champions Trophy Awards
  - Player of the tournament: Luciana Aymar (2000, 2001, 2003, 2004, 2005, 2008, 2010, 2012), Cecilia Rognoni (2002), Carla Rebecchi (2016)
  - Top Goalscorer: Vanina Oneto (2002), Alejandra Gulla (2004), Soledad García (2005), Noel Barrionuevo (2007, 2010), Carla Rebecchi (2014, 2016)
  - Goalkeeper of the tournament: Belén Succi (2009, 2011, 2012, 2014)
  - Young player of the tournament: María José Granatto (2016)
- World League Awards
  - Top Goalscorer at the final: Delfina Merino (2016–17)
  - Young player at the final: María José Granatto (2014–15)
  - Top Goalscorer at the semifinal: Carla Rebecchi (2014–15)

== See also ==
- Argentina women's national under-21 field hockey team
- Argentina men's national field hockey squad records
