= Field hockey at the 2019 Pan American Games – Women's team rosters =

This article shows the rosters of all participating teams at the women's field hockey tournament at the 2019 Pan American Games in Lima, Peru. Rosters can have a maximum of 16 athletes.

Age and caps as of 29 July 2019 and clubs for which they played in the 2018–19 season.

== Pool A ==
=== Argentina ===
The following 16 players were named in the Argentina squad, which was announced on 11 July 2019.

Head Coach: Carlos Retegui

No.	Pos.	Player	Date of birth (age)	Caps	Club
1	GK	Belén Succi	16 October 1985 (aged 33)	226	(Argentina) CASI
2	DF	Sofía Toccalino	20 March 1997 (aged 22)	69	(Argentina) St. Catherine's
25	DF	Silvina D'Elía	25 April 1986 (aged 33)	237	(Argentina) GEBA
27	DF	Noel Barrionuevo	16 May 1984 (aged 35)	320	(Argentina) Newman
32	DF	Valentina Costa Biondi	13 September 1995 (aged 23)	14	(Argentina) San Fernando
4	MF	Rosario Luchetti (C)	4 June 1984 (aged 35)	271	(Argentina) Belgrano
5	MF	Agostina Alonso	1 October 1995 (aged 23)	65	(Argentina) Banco Nación
7	MF	Giselle Kañevsky	4 August 1985 (aged 33)	134	(Argentina) Hacoaj
18	MF	Victoria Sauze	21 July 1991 (aged 28)	60	(Argentina) River Plate
22	MF	Eugenia Trinchinetti	17 July 1997 (aged 22)	82	(Argentina) San Fernando
23	MF	Micaela Retegui	23 April 1996 (aged 23)	18	(Argentina) San Fernando
11	FW	Carla Rebecchi	7 September 1984 (aged 34)	300	(Argentina) Ciudad
15	FW	María Granatto	21 April 1995 (aged 24)	108	(Argentina) Santa Bárbara
19	FW	Agustina Albertarrio	1 January 1993 (aged 26)	143	(Argentina) Lomas
21	FW	Victoria Granatto	9 April 1991 (aged 28)	12	(Argentina) Santa Bárbara
28	FW	Julieta Jankunas	20 January 1999 (aged 20)	79	(Argentina) Ciudad

Reserves:

- Cristina Cosentino (GK)
- Priscila Jardel

=== Canada ===
The following 16 players were named in the Canada squad.

Head Coach: Giles Bonnet

No.	Pos.	Player	Date of birth (age)	Caps	Club
1	GK	Kaitlyn Williams	15 August 1989 (aged 29)	137	(Argentina) CASI
8	DF	Elise Wong	21 January 1998 (age 28)	13	(United States) Princeton University
9	DF	Danielle Hennig	23 December 1990 (age 35)	188	(Belgium) Royal Victory
14	DF	Karli Johansen	26 March 1992 (age 34)	133	(Belgium) Royal Léopold
17	DF	Sara McManus	14 August 1993 (age 32)	175	(Belgium) KHC Leuven
25	DF	Shanlee Johnston	5 February 1990 (age 36)	115	(Belgium) Gantoise
6	MF	Anna Mollenhauer	18 September 1999 (age 26)	14	(Canada) University of Victoria
16	MF	Natalie Sourisseau	5 December 1992 (age 33)	141	(Netherlands) THC Hurley
21	MF	Amanda Woodcroft	9 October 1993 (age 32)	115	(Belgium) KHC Leuven
22	MF	Madeline Secco	15 March 1994 (age 32)	127	(Belgium) Royal Victory
3	FW	Katherine Wright (C)	14 August 1989 (age 36)	216	(Belgium) KHC Leuven
11	FW	Rachel Donohoe	17 October 1994 (age 31)	76	(Belgium) Gantoise
13	FW	Hannah Haughn	4 September 1994 (age 31)	179	(Belgium) Royal Victory
19	FW	Holly Stewart	18 May 1993 (age 33)	92	(Belgium) Hockey Namur
23	FW	Brienne Stairs	22 December 1989 (age 36)	163	(Belgium) KHC Leuven
26	FW	Stephanie Norlander	20 December 1995 (age 30)	114	(Belgium) KHC Leuven

=== Cuba ===
The following players were named in the Cuba squad.

Head Coach: Nelson Ginorio Vega

1. Yusnaidy Betancourt (GK)
2. Yurismailis Garcia (GK)
4. Sunaylis Nikle (C)
6. Roseli Harrys
8. Arlettis Tirse
9. Brizaida Ramos
11. Leticia Fernandez
12. Yunia Milanes
13. Yuraima Vera
14. Yadira Miclin
15. Jennifer Martinez
16. Jessica Ortiz
18. Yeskenia Gutierre
21. Yurima Soria
25. Yurisleydis Reyes
26. Lismary Gonzalez

=== Uruguay ===
The following players were named in the Uruguay squad.

Head Coach: Nicolás Tixe

1. Constance Schmidt-Liermann (GK)
3. Manuela Vilar
5. Pilar Oliveros
6. Camila de Maria
7. Constanza Barrandeguy
8. Janine Stanley
10. Anastasia Olave
13. Agustina Taborda
14. Magdalena Gomez
15. Clementina Cristiani
17. Teresa Viana
20. Agustina Nieto (C)
21. Soledad Villar
22. Camila Piazza
25. Agustina Prattes
27. Jimena Garcia
29. Georgina Petrik
32. Maria Bate (GK)

== Pool B ==
=== Chile ===
The following 16 players were named in the Chile squad.

Head Coach: Diego Amoroso

No.	Pos.	Player	Date of birth (age)	Caps	Club
1	GK	Claudia Schüler	28 November 1987 (aged 31)	213	(Germany) Club an der Alster
3	DF	Fernanda Villagran	12 August 1997 (aged 21)	56	(Chile) Club Manquehue
4	DF	Catalina Barahona	2 January 1994 (aged 25)	31	(United States) ODU Monarchs
6	DF	Fernanda Flores	14 September 1993 (aged 25)	155	(Chile) Universidad Católica
13	DF	Camila Caram (C)	22 April 1989 (aged 30)	225	(Chile) Prince of Wales Country Club
16	DF	Constanza Palma	29 March 1992 (aged 27)	159	(Chile) Universidad Católica
5	MF	Denise Krimerman	4 July 1994 (aged 25)	148	(Chile) Old Reds
8	MF	Carolina García	21 March 1985 (aged 34)	245	(Chile) Prince of Wales Country Club
19	MF	Agustina Solano	5 April 1995 (aged 24)	45	(Chile) Universidad Católica
20	MF	Francisca Parra	6 October 1999 (aged 19)	20	(Chile) Universidad Católica
25	MF	María Maldonado	13 August 1997 (aged 21)	49	(Chile) Prince of Wales Country Club
2	FW	Sofía Walbaum	18 May 1989 (aged 30)	203	(Chile) Prince of Wales Country Club
9	FW	Kim Jacob	5 August 1996 (aged 22)	60	(Chile) Club Manquehue
10	FW	Manuela Urroz	24 September 1991 (aged 27)	187	(Belgium) Royal Antwerp
21	FW	Josefa Villalabeitia	12 October 1990 (aged 28)	171	(Chile) Prince of Wales Country Club
30	FW	Consuelo de las Heras	22 September 1995 (aged 23)	34	(Chile) S.M.O.G.

Reserves:

- Mariana Lagos
- Natalia Salvador (GK)

=== Mexico ===
The following 16 players were named in the Mexico squad.

Head Coach: Arely Castellanos

1. Jesús Castillo (GK)
2. Mireya Bianchi
3. Mayra Lacheno
4. Maribel Acosta
6. Karen González
7. Cindy Correa
8. María Correa
10. Michel Navarro (C)
11. Jennifer Valdés
12. Montserrat Inguanzo (GK)
13. Ana Juárez
14. Marlet Correa
15. Arlette Estrada
16. Fernanda Oviedo
17. Nathalia Nava
27. Karen Orozco

=== Peru ===
The following 16 players were named in the Peru squad.

Head Coach: Patricio Martínez

1. Chiara Conetta (GK)
2. Camila Levaggi
3. Solange Alonso
4. Geraldine Quino
5. Claudia Ardiles
6. María José Fermi (C)
7. Marina Montes
8. Nicole Cueva
9. Yurandi Quino
10. Marianella Álvarez
11. Camila Méndez
12. Ana Palomino (GK)
13. María Jiménez
14. Malen Moccagatta
15. Victoria Montes
16. Daniela Ramírez

=== United States ===
The following 16 players were named in the United States squad, which was announced on 9 July 2019.

Head Coach: Janneke Schopman

No.	Pos.	Player	Date of birth (age)	Caps	Club
31	GK	Kelsey Bing	1 October 1997 (aged 21)	14	(United States) Texas Pride
5	MF	Casey Umstead	16 February 1996 (aged 23)	15	(United States) X-Calibur
12	MF	Amanda Magadan	28 March 1995 (aged 24)	67	(United States) Rapid Fire Elite
14	MF	Julia Young	8 May 1995 (aged 24)	44	(United States) Focus Field Hockey Club
20	MF	Ali Froede	8 April 1993 (aged 26)	81	(United States) Rampage
28	MF	Caitlin van Sickle	26 January 1990 (aged 29)	138	(United States) First State Diamonds
29	MF	Alyssa Manley	27 May 1994 (aged 25)	114	(United States) Sutters Brigade & High Styx
2	MF	Lauren Moyer	13 May 1995 (aged 24)	63	(United States) Nook Hockey
13	MF	Ashley Hoffman	8 November 1996 (aged 22)	58	(United States) X-Calibur
16	MF	Linnea Gonzales	15 August 1997 (aged 21)	18	(United States) H2O Field Hockey
17	MF	Anna Dessoye	13 July 1994 (aged 25)	44	(United States) Valley Styx
23	MF	Mackenzie Allessie	6 March 2001 (aged 18)	17	(United States) Alleycats
1	FW	Erin Matson	17 March 2000 (aged 19)	54	(United States) WC Eagles
4	FW	Danielle Grega	2 July 1996 (aged 23)	18	(United States) KaPow & PA Elite FHC
24	FW	Kathleen Sharkey (C)	30 April 1990 (aged 29)	166	(United States) Valley Styx
26	FW	Margaux Paolino	1 July 1997 (aged 22)	21	(United States) X-Calibur

Reserves:

- Alyssa Parker
- Kealsie Robles (GK)
