= 2020–21 Women's FIH Pro League squads =

This article lists the squads of all participating teams in the 2020–21 FIH Pro League. The nine national teams involved in the tournament were required to register a squad of up to 32 players.

== Argentina ==
The following is the Argentina squad for the 2020 FIH Pro League.

Head coach: Carlos Retegui

1. Belén Succi (GK)
2. Sofía Toccalino
3. Agustina Gorzelany
5. Agostina Alonso
12. Delfina Merino (C)
13. Cristina Cosentino (GK)
14. Clara Barberi (GK)
15. María José Granatto
16. Bárbara Dichiara
17. Rocío Sánchez Moccia
18. Victoria Sauze
19. Agustina Albertario
21. Victoria Granatto
22. Eugenia Trinchinetti
23. Micaela Retegui
26. Sofía Maccari
27. Noel Barrionuevo
28. Julieta Jankunas
29. Victoria Miranda
32. Valentina Costa Biondi
36. Mariana Scandura (GK)
38. Constanza Cerundolo
39. Delfina Thome
40. Emilia Forcherio
41. Valentina Raposo
- The following players competed in 2020, however were not included in Argentina's 2021 national squad.
4. Rosario Luchetti
7. Giselle Kañevsky
9. Priscila Jardel
11. Carla Rebecchi
25. Silvina D'Elía
- The following players were listed to compete, but didin't make it in any match.
6. Bianca Donati
24. Celina di Santo
33. Josefina Rübenacker
34. Sofía Ramallo
35. Brisa Bruggesser
37. Inés Delpech
42. Mariana Pineda
43. Sol Pagella

== Australia ==
The following is the Australia squad for the 2020 FIH Pro League.

Head coach: Paul Gaudoin, replaced in 2021 by Katrina Powell

1. Sophie Taylor
2. Ambrosia Malone
3. Brooke Peris (C)
4. Amy Lawton
5. Ashlee Wells (GK)
6. Penny Squibb
7. Aleisha Power (GK)
8. Georgia Wilson
10. Madison Fitzpatrick
11. Meg Pearce
12. Greta Hayes
13. Edwina Bone (C)
14. Stephanie Kershaw (C)
15. Kaitlin Nobbs
16. Courtney Schonell
18. Jane Claxton (C)
19. Jocelyn Bartram (GK)
20. Karri Somerville
21. Renee Taylor
22. Kate Jenner
23. Kalindi Commerford
24. Mariah Williams
26. Emily Chalker
27. Rachael Lynch (GK)
30. Grace Stewart
31. Laura Barden
32. Savannah Fitzpatrick
- The following players competed in 2020, however were not included in Hockey Australia's 2021 national squad.
7. Jodie Kenny
9. Lily Brazel
11. Karri McMahon
17. Georgina Morgan

== Belgium ==
The following is the Belgium squad for the 2020 FIH Pro League.

Head coach: Niels Thiessen, replaced in September 2020 by (Netherlands) Raoul Ehren

2. Sophie Limauge
3. Abi Raye
7. Judith Vandermeiren
8. Emma Puvrez
10. Louise Versavel
11. Joanne Peeters
13. Alix Gerniers
15. Anne-Sophie Weyns
16. Tiphaine Duquesne
17. Michelle Struijk
18. Shaunda Ikegwuonu
19. Barbara Nelen (C)
20. Pauline de Ryck (GK)
21. Aisling D'Hooghe (GK)
22. Stéphanie Vanden Borre
23. Elena Sotgiu (GK)
24. Anne-Sophie Vanden Borre
25. Pauline Leclef
26. Lien Hillewaert
28. Justine Rasir
29. Elodie Picard (GK)
30. Ambre Ballenghien
31. Lucie Breyne
32. Charlotte Englebert
33. Alexia 't Serstevens
34. Vanessa Blockmans
35. Anne-Sophie Roels
36. Hélène Brasseur
37. France de Mot
38. Agathe Willems

== China ==
The following is the China squad for the 2020 FIH Pro League.

Head coach: Wang Yang

1. Li Dongxiao (GK)
2. Gu Bingfeng
5. Li Jiaqi
6. Zhang Ying
7. Cui Qiuxia (C)
8. Sun Xiao
9. Ma Ning
10. Peng Yang
11. Liang Meiyu
12. Guo Qiu
13. Li Hong
15. Zhang Jinrong
16. Ou Zixia
19. Zhang Xiaoxue
21. Liu Meng
24. Wang Na
26. Chen Yang
27. Jin Jing
28. Luo Tiantian
29. Chen Yi
31. Zhong Jiaqi
32. Ye Jiao (GK)

== Germany ==
The following is the Germany squad for the 2020 FIH Pro League.

Head coach: (Belgium) Xavier Reckinger

2. Kira Horn
3. Amelie Wortmann
4. Nike Lorenz
5. Selin Oruz
6. Hannah Gablać
8. Anne Schröder
9. Elisa Gräve
10. Philin Bolle
11. Lena Micheel
12. Charlotte Stapenhorst
13. Teresa Martin-Pelegrina
14. Janne Müller-Wieland (C)
15. Nathalie Kubalski (GK)
16. Sonja Zimmermann
17. Emma Davidsmeyer
18. Lisa Altenburg
19. Maike Schaunig
20. Julia Sonntag (GK)
21. Franzisca Hauke
22. Cécile Pieper
23. Carlotta Sippel
24. Pia Maertens
25. Viktoria Huse
26. Alisa Vivot
27. Naomi Heyn
28. Rebecca Grote
29. Emma Boermans
30. Hanna Granitzki
31. Nele Aring
32. Rosa Kruger (GK)
33. Katharina Kirschbaum
34. Katharina Kiefer
38. Jette Fleschütz
39. Anna Kilian (GK)
40. Liv Arndt
44. Stine Kurz
45. Lara Birkner
66. Pauline Heinz
71. Lisa Nolte

== Great Britain ==
The following is the Great Britain squad for the 2020 FIH Pro League.

Head coach: (Australia) Mark Hager

1. Maddie Hinch (GK)
3. Amy Tennant (GK)
4. Laura Unsworth
5. Sarah Evans
6. Anna Toman
7. Hannah Martin
8. Sarah Jones
9. Susannah Townsend
10. Sarah Robertson
12. Charlotte Watson
13. Elena Rayer
14. Tessa Howard
16. Emily Defroand
17. Leah Wilkinson
18. Giselle Ansley
20. Hollie Pearne-Webb (C)
22. Elizabeth Neal
24. Shona McCallin
25. Sabbie Heesh (GK)
26. Lily Owsley
27. Jo Hunter
29. Esme Burge
31. Grace Balsdon
32. Amy Costello
33. Isabelle Petter
36. Emily Dark
37. Sophie Hamilton
38. Fiona Crackles
39. Holly Hunt
40. Miriam Pritchard (GK)

== Netherlands ==
The following is the Netherlands squad for the 2020 FIH Pro League.

Head coach: (Australia) Alyson Annan

1. Anne Veenendaal (GK)
3. Sanne Koolen
5. Malou Pheninckx
6. Laurien Leurink
7. Xan de Waard
8. Marloes Keetels
11. Maria Verschoor
12. Lidewij Welten
13. Caia van Maasakker
15. Frédérique Matla
16. Ginella Zerbo
17. Ireen van den Assem
18. Pien Sanders
19. Marijn Veen
20. Laura Nunnink
21. Lauren Stam
22. Josine Koning (GK)
23. Margot van Geffen
24. Eva de Goede (C)
25. Kyra Fortuin
26. Marie Burg
27. Yibbi Jansen*, replaced in 2021 by Renée van Laarhoven
28. Tessa Clasener
29. Stella van Gils
30. Julia Remmerswaal (GK)
31. Freeke Moes
32. Danique Visser (GK)
33. Ilse Kappelle
34. Pien Dicke
35. Felice Albers
36. Marente Barentsen
37. Saane Caarls
38. Lisa Post
39. Anna de Geus
40. Kiki Gunneman (GK)

== New Zealand ==
The following is the New Zealand squad for the 2020 FIH Pro League.

Head coach: (Republic of Ireland) Graham Shaw

1. Tarryn Davey
2. Olivia Shannon
4. Olivia Merry
5. Frances Davies
6. Amy Robinson
7. Kayla Whitelock
8. Gemma McCaw
9. Brooke Neal
10. Brooke Roberts (GK)
11. Rachel McCann
12. Ella Gunson
13. Samantha Charlton
14. Tyler Lench
15. Grace O'Hanlon (GK)
16. Liz Thompson
17. Stephanie Dickins
20. Megan Hull
21. Alia Jaques
22. Katie Doar
24. Rose Keddell
25. Kelsey Smith
26. Kaitlin Cotter
27. Holly Pearson
28. Kate Ivory
29. Madison Doar
31. Stacey Michelsen (C)
32. Tayla White
33. Julia King
34. Hope Ralph
42. Georgia Barnett (GK)

== United States ==
The following is the United States squad for the 2020 FIH Pro League.

Head coach: Caroline Nelson-Nichols, replaced in 2021 by (Australia) Anthony Farry

1. Erin Matson
2. Lauren Moyer
3. Jessica Jecko (GK)
4. Danielle Grega
5. Casey Umstead
6. Virginia Bramley
7. Ali Campbell
8. Alyssa Parker
9. Miranda Rigg
10. Madison Maguire
11. Taylor West
12. Amanda Magadan
13. Ashley Hoffman (C)
14. Julia Young*
15. Corinne Zanolli
16. Linnea Gonzales
17. Anna Dessoye*
18. Mary Barham
19. Kelly Marks*, replaced in 2021 by Rachel Robinson
20. Ali Froede*
21. Alexandra Hammel
22. Nicole Woods
23. Mackenzie Allessie
24. Kelee Lepage
25. Karlie Heistand
26. Margaux Paolino
27. Laura Hurff
28. Kathleen Sharkey*, replaced in 2021 by Haley Randall
29. Alyssa Manley*
30. Kealsie Robles (GK)
31. Kelsey Bing (GK)
32. Elisabeth Yeager
33. Caroline Hanks
34. Julianna Tornetta
35. Madeleine Bacskai
36. Madeleine Zimmer
37. Kelsey Briddell
38. Jillian Wolgemuth

* indicates players no longer listed to compete
