= Field hockey at the 2019 Pan American Games =

- Field hockey pictogram
- Venue: Hockey field
- Dates: 30 July – 10 August, 2019
- Competitors: 256 from 9 nations

Field hockey competitions at the 2019 Pan American Games in Lima, Peru were scheduled to be held from July 30 to August 10. The venue for the competition is the Hockey field located at the Villa María del Triunfo cluster. A total of eight men's and eight women's teams (each consisting up to 16 athletes) competed in each tournament. This means a total of 256 athletes are scheduled to compete.

The winner of each competition will qualify for the 2020 Summer Olympics in Tokyo, Japan.

== Medal table ==
Rank	Nation	Gold	Silver	Bronze	Total
1	Argentina	2	0	0	2
2	Canada	0	2	0	2
3	United States	0	0	2	2
Totals (3 entries)		2	2	2	6

== Medalists ==
Event	Gold	Silver	Bronze
Men's tournament	Argentina; Juan Manuel Vivaldi; Pedro Ibarra; Nicolás Keenan; Maico Casella; Matías Paredes; Lucas Vila; Leandro Tolini; Ignacio Ortiz; Juan Martín López; Matías Rey; Lucas Martínez; Nicolás Cicileo; Agustín Mazzilli; Federico Fernández; Agustín Bugallo; Martín Ferreiro	Canada; Brandon Pereira; Scott Tupper; Oliver Scholfield; Keegan Pereira; Balraj Panesar; Adam Froese; Gordon Johnston; Brenden Bissett; James Wallace; Mark Pearson; John Smythe; Iain Smythe; James Kirkpatrick; Sukhi Panesar; Taylor Curran; David Carter	United States; Jonathan Klages; Michael Barminski; Tyler Sundeen; Pat Harris; Thomas Barratt; Adam Miller; Alberto Montilla; Ajai Dhadwal; Aki Käppeler; Kei Käppeler; Christian DeAngelis; Paul Singh; Sean Cicchie; Deegan Huisman; Jonathan Orozco; Mohan Gandhi
Women's tournament	Argentina; Belén Succi; Sofía Toccalino; Rosario Luchetti; Agostina Alonso; Giselle Kañevsky; Carla Rebecchi; María José Granatto; Victoria Sauze; Agustina Albertario; Victoria Granatto; Eugenia Trinchinetti; Micaela Retegui; Silvina D'Elía; Noel Barrionuevo; Julieta Jankunas; Valentina Costa Biondi	Canada; Kaitlyn Williams; Kate Wright; Anna Mollenhauer; Elise Wong; Danielle Hennig; Rachel Donohoe; Hannah Haughn; Karli Johansen; Natalie Sourisseau; Sara McManus; Holly Stewart; Amanda Woodcroft; Madeline Secco; Brienne Stairs; Shanlee Johnston; Stephanie Norlander	United States; Erin Matson; Lauren Moyer; Danielle Grega; Casey Umstead; Amanda Magadan; Ashley Hoffman; Julia Young; Linnea Gonzales; Anna Dessoye; Ali Froede; Mackenzie Allessie; Kathleen Sharkey; Margaux Paolino; Caitlin Van Sickle; Alyssa Manley; Kelsey Bing

== Participating nations ==
Nine countries qualified field hockey teams. The numbers of participants qualified is in parentheses.

- Argentina (32)
- Canada (32)
- Chile (32)
- Cuba (32)
- Mexico (32)
- Peru (32)
- Trinidad and Tobago (16)
- Uruguay (16)
- United States (32)

== Qualification ==
A total of eight men's teams and eight women's team will qualify to compete at the games in each tournament. The host nation (Peru) received automatic qualification in both tournaments. The top two teams at the 2018 Central American and Caribbean Games and 2018 South American Games also qualified. The top two teams not yet qualified from the 2017 Pan American Cups (after the results from the above two tournaments are taken into account) also qualified. If the Canada and/or the United States have not qualified still, a playoff between the nations and the third ranked at the Pan American Cups will take place. If both nations do qualify, the playoff will be not necessary and the third placed team at each Pan American Cup will qualify. The Pan American Hockey Federation (PAHF) officially announced the qualified teams on September 10, 2018.

=== Men ===
Event	Dates	Location	Quotas	Qualified
Host Nation	—N/a	—N/a	1	Peru
2018 South American Games	29 May – 6 June	(Bolivia) Cochabamba	2	Argentina; Chile
2018 Central American and Caribbean Games	21–29 July	(Colombia) Barranquilla	2	Cuba; Mexico
2017 Men's Pan American Cup	4–12 August	(United States) Lancaster	3	Canada; United States; Trinidad and Tobago
Total			8	

- A playoff was not necessary, as Canada and the United States were the top two teams not qualified from the 2017 Men's Pan American Cup.

=== Women ===
Event	Dates	Location	Quotas	Qualified
Host Nation	—N/a	—N/a	1	Peru
2018 South American Games	30 May – 7 June	(Bolivia) Cochabamba	2	Argentina; Uruguay
2018 Central American and Caribbean Games	20–28 July	(Colombia) Barranquilla	2	Cuba; Mexico
2017 Women's Pan American Cup	5–13 August	(United States) Lancaster	3	Canada*; Chile (15); United States
Total			8	

- A playoff was not held, and Canada was automatically given the spot.

== Men's tournament ==
=== Preliminary round ===
==== Pool A ====
Pos	Team	Pld	W	D	L	GF	GA	GD	Pts	Qualification
1	Argentina	3	3	0	0	20	1	+19	9	Quarter-finals
2	Chile	3	2	0	1	7	5	+2	6	Quarter-finals
3	Cuba	3	1	0	2	3	15	−12	3	Quarter-finals
4	Trinidad and Tobago	3	0	0	3	2	11	−9	0	Quarter-finals

Source: FIH

==== Pool B ====
Pos	Team	Pld	W	D	L	GF	GA	GD	Pts	Qualification
1	Canada	3	3	0	0	23	2	+21	9	Quarter-finals
2	United States	3	2	0	1	21	5	+16	6	Quarter-finals
3	Mexico	3	1	0	2	10	12	−2	3	Quarter-finals
4	Peru (H)	3	0	0	3	3	38	−35	0	Quarter-finals

Source: FIH
(H) Hosts

=== Classification round ===
Quarter-finals
5 August
Argentina	14
Peru	1
5 August
Cuba	1
United States	5
5 August
Chile	2
Mexico	0
5 August
Trinidad and Tobago	1
Canada	5

Semi-finals
8 August
Argentina	5
United States	0
8 August
Chile	2
Canada	3

Gold medal match
10 August
Argentina	5
Canada	2
Bronze medal match
10 August
United States	2
Chile	1

=== Final standings ===
Pos	Team	Qualification
1	Argentina	2020 Summer Olympics
2	Canada	
3	United States	
4	Chile	
5	Trinidad and Tobago	
6	Cuba	
7	Mexico	
8	Peru (H)	

Source: FIH
(H) Host

== Women's tournament ==
=== Preliminary round ===
==== Pool A ====
Pos	Team	Pld	W	D	L	GF	GA	GD	Pts	Qualification
1	Argentina	3	3	0	0	18	1	+17	9	Quarter-finals
2	Canada	3	2	0	1	15	3	+12	6	Quarter-finals
3	Uruguay	3	1	0	2	8	8	0	3	Quarter-finals
4	Cuba	3	0	0	3	2	31	−29	0	Quarter-finals

Source: FIH

==== Pool B ====
Pos	Team	Pld	W	D	L	GF	GA	GD	Pts	Qualification
1	United States	3	3	0	0	17	2	+15	9	Quarter-finals
2	Chile	3	2	0	1	17	4	+13	6	Quarter-finals
3	Mexico	3	1	0	2	4	7	−3	3	Quarter-finals
4	Peru (H)	3	0	0	3	0	25	−25	0	Quarter-finals

Source: FIH
(H) Hosts

=== Classification round ===
Quarter-finals
4 August
Argentina	21
Peru	0
4 August
Uruguay	0
Chile	5
4 August
Canada	9
Mexico	0
4 August
Cuba	0
United States	9

Semi-finals
6 August
Argentina	3
Chile	1
6 August
Canada	2
United States	0

Gold medal match
9 August
Argentina	5
Canada	1
Bronze medal match
9 August
Chile	1
United States	5

=== Final standings ===
Rank	Team
Gold medal	Argentina
Silver medal	Canada
Bronze medal	United States
4	Chile
5	Uruguay
6	Mexico
7	Peru
8	Cuba

Qualified for the 2020 Summer Olympics

== See also ==
- Field hockey at the 2020 Summer Olympics
