= 2022 Women's Pan American Cup =

Tournament details
- Host country: Chile
- City: Santiago
- Dates: 19–29 January
- Teams: 7 (from 1 confederation)
- Venue: Prince of Wales Country Club

Final positions
- Champions: Argentina (6th title)
- Runner-up: Chile
- Third place: Canada

Tournament statistics
- Matches played: 16
- Goals scored: 108 (6.75 per match)
- Top scorer: (United States) Erin Matson (10 goals)
- Best player: (Argentina) María José Granatto

The 2022 Women's Pan American Cup was the sixth edition of the Women's Pan American Cup, the quadrennial international women's field hockey championship of the Americas organized by the Pan American Hockey Federation.

It was planned to be held from 7 until 22 August 2021 in Tacarigua, Trinidad and Tobago. However, following the postponement of the 2020 Summer Olympics to July and August 2021 because of the COVID-19 pandemic the tournament was rescheduled and on 4 September 2020 the hosts Trinidad and Tobago withdrew from hosting the tournament.

Argentina were the defending champions, winning the 2017 edition. They defended their title after a final win over Chile.

The top three teams qualified for the 2022 FIH Hockey World Cup.

In November 2020, Pan American Hockey Federation announced that the cup would be held from 19 to 29 January 2022 in Santiago, Chile.

== Qualification ==
The top six teams from the previous Pan American Cup, the host if not already qualified and the winner of the 2021 Pan American Challenge qualified for the tournament.

Dates	Event	Location	Quotas	Qualifier(s)
—N/a	Host	—N/a	0	– (Note: Chile already qualified by finishing in the top six at the 2017 Pan American Cup so that quota was added to the 2021 Pan American Challenge.)
5–13 August 2017	2017 Pan American Cup	Lancaster, United States	5	Argentina; Chile; United States; Canada; Uruguay; ~~Mexico~~
26 September – 2 October 2021	2021 Pan American Challenge	Lima, Peru	2	Peru; Trinidad and Tobago
Total			7	

Mexico withdrew before the tournament.

== Preliminary round ==
=== Pool A ===
Pos	Team	Pld	W	D	L	GF	GA	GD	Pts	Qualification
1	Argentina	2	2	0	0	10	0	+10	6	Semi-finals
2	Chile (H)	2	1	0	1	4	4	0	3	Cross-overs
3	Uruguay	2	0	0	2	0	10	−10	0	Cross-overs

Source: FIH
Rules for classification: 1) points; 2) matches won; 3) goal difference; 4) goals for; 5) head-to-head result; 6) field goals scored.
(H) Hosts

19 January 2022
18:30

Argentina	6–0	Uruguay
Gorzelany 2', 45'; Retegui 9'; Albertario 30'; Thome 35'; Di Santo 42'	Report

Umpires:
Ayanna McClean (TTO)
Mary Driscoll (USA)

21 January 2022
18:30

Chile	0–4	Argentina
	Report	Alonso 27'; Granatto 35', 59'; Gorzelany 43'

Umpires:
Victoria Pazos (PAR)
Natalia Lodeiro (URU)

23 January 2022
18:30

Uruguay	0–4	Chile
	Report	Maldonado 2'; Caram 5'; Arrieta 12'; Flores 52'

Umpires:
Veronica Villafañe (ARG)
Mary Driscoll (USA)

=== Pool B ===
Pos	Team	Pld	W	D	L	GF	GA	GD	Pts	Qualification
1	United States	3	3	0	0	39	1	+38	9	Semi-finals
2	Canada	3	2	0	1	28	3	+25	6	Cross-overs
3	Trinidad and Tobago (Note: Trinidad and Tobago were originally drawn into Group A, but after Mexico withdrew, they were moved to Group B.)	3	1	0	2	2	29	−27	3	Cross-overs
4	Peru	3	0	0	3	0	36	−36	0	
5	Mexico (Note: Mexico withdrew before the start of the tournament.)	0	0	0	0	0	0	0	0	Withdrawn

Source: FIH
Rules for classification: 1) points; 2) matches won; 3) goal difference; 4) goals for; 5) head-to-head result; 6) field goals scored.
Notes:

19 January 2022
14:00

Canada	14–0	Peru
Stairs 15', 28', 35', 43', 60'; Wong 18', 42'; Lee 25'; Secco 26'; McManus 47'; Woodcroft 48'; Faiczak 49', 55'; Thompson 52'	Report

Umpires:
Catalina Montesino (CHI)
Natalia Lodeiro (URU)

19 January 2022
16:15

United States	16–0	Trinidad and Tobago
Yeager 1', 40', 46'; Matson 3', 24', 33'; Sessa 4', 24'; Rose 8', 26', 30+', 57'; Southam 38'; Marshall 54'; Grega 55'; Moyer 59'	Report

Umpires:
Veronica Villafañe (ARG)
Victoria Pazos (PAR)

21 January 2022
14:00

Peru	0–2	Trinidad and Tobago
	Report	K. Olton 43'; King 58'

Umpires:
Mary Driscoll (USA)
Veronica Villafañe (ARG)

21 January 2022
16:15

United States	3–1	Canada
Kisha 49'; Sessa 57'; Magadan 59'	Report	Stairs 48'

Umpires:
Catalina Montesino (CHI)
Ayanna McClean (TTO)

23 January 2022
14:00

Canada	13–0	Trinidad and Tobago
Wong 6'; Thompson 7', 11', 39'; Johansen 13'; Rae 18', 20', 60'; Secco 24'; Sourisseau 26'; Stairs 30'; McManus 34'; Mollenhauer 55'	Report

Umpires:
Victoria Pazos (PAR)
Natalia Lodeiro (URU)

23 January 2022
16:15

Peru	0–20	United States
	Report	Moyer 6', 29', 51'; Zimmer 13'; Rose 25', 42'; Grega 26', 33', 52', 56'; Matson 27', 30', 42', 46', 50', 59'; Yeager 36', 55'; Southam 38'; Magadan 43'

Umpires:
Ayanna McClean (TTO)
Catalina Montesino (CHI)

== Classification round ==
=== Bracket ===
Cross-overs
25 January
Canada (p.s.o.)	1 (3)
Uruguay	1 (0)
25 January
Chile	11
Trinidad and Tobago	0

Semi-finals
27 January
Argentina	3
Canada	0
27 January
United States	1 (0)
Chile (p.s.o.)	1 (2)

Final
29 January
Argentina	4
Chile	2
Third place
29 January
Canada	1
United States	0

=== Cross-overs ===
25 January 2022
17:00

Canada	1–1	Uruguay
Wong 9'	Report	Viana 10'
Penalties
Woodcroft (penalty shoot-out scored); Secco (penalty shoot-out scored); Sourisseau (penalty shoot-out scored)	3–0	(penalty shoot-out missed) Vilar; (penalty shoot-out missed) Algorta; (penalty shoot-out missed) Gómez

Umpires:
Catalina Montesino (CHI)
Veronica Villafañe (ARG)

25 January 2022
18:30

Chile	11–0	Trinidad and Tobago
Lagos 7'; Arrieta 10', 50'; Krimerman 14', 58'; De las Heras 26'; Urroz 32', 59'; Tala 34'; Filipek 43'; Maldonado 51'	Report

Umpires:
Victoria Pazos (PAR)
Natalia Lodeiro (URU)

=== Fifth and sixth place ===
Cancelled (Note: The match, originally scheduled for 27 January, could not be played due to several positive COVID-19 tests by the team of Trinidad and Tobago. As a result, the game was forfeited by Trinidad and Tobago and counted as a 5–0 win for Uruguay.)

Uruguay	5–0	Trinidad and Tobago
	Report

=== Semi-finals ===
27 January 2022
16:00

Argentina	3–0	Canada
Trinchinetti 32'; Cedrés 52', 56'	Report

Umpires:
Ayanna McClean (TTO)
Natalia Lodeiro (URU)

27 January 2022
18:30

United States	1–1	Chile
Matson 59'	Report	Ananías 45'
Penalties
Matson (penalty shoot-out missed); Yeager (penalty shoot-out missed); Sessa (penalty shoot-out missed); Zimmer (penalty shoot-out missed)	0–2	(penalty shoot-out scored) Tala; (penalty shoot-out missed) Valdivia; (penalty shoot-out scored) Ananías

Umpires:
Veronica Villafañe (ARG)
Victoria Pazos (PAR)

=== Third and fourth place ===
29 January 2022
16:00

Canada	1–0	United States
Woodcroft 15'	Report

Umpires:
Catalina Montesino (CHI)
Veronica Villafañe (ARG)

=== Final ===
29 January 2022
18:30

Argentina	4–2	Chile
Granatto 15', 57'; Albertario 39'; Gorzelany 53'	Report	Krimerman 34', 48'

Umpires:
Ayanna McClean (TTO)
Natalia Lodeiro (URU)

Team details

Argentina
Chile

GK	1	Belén Succi
DF	2	Sofía Toccalino	11'
DF	3	Agustina Gorzelany
DF	20	Valentina Raposo
DF	32	Valentina Costa Biondi	23'
MF	5	Agostina Alonso
MF	17	Rocío Sánchez Moccia (c)
MF	10	María José Granatto
MF	22	Eugenia Trinchinetti
FW	7	Agustina Albertario
FW	28	Julieta Jankunas
Substitutions:
DF	16	Bárbara Dichiara		(substituted on) 16'
	18	Victoria Sauze		(substituted on) 5'
MF	23	Micaela Retegui		(substituted on) 6'
MF	24	Celina Di Santo		(substituted on) 9'
MF	25	Jimena Cedrés	(yellow card) 51'	(substituted on) 5'
FW	39	Delfina Thome		(substituted on) 5'
Coach:
(Argentina) Fernando Ferrara

GK	1	Claudia Schüler
DF	3	Fernanda Villagrán	53'
DF	5	Denise Rojas
DF	6	Fernanda Flores
DF	13	Camila Caram
DF	19	Mariana Lagos
MF	14	Francisca Tala
MF	16	Constanza Palma (c)
MF	22	Paula Valdivia
FW	10	Manuela Urroz
FW	25	María J. Maldonado
Substitutions:
DF	2	Doménica Ananías		(substituted on) 9'
MF	7	Sofía Filipek		(substituted on) 9'
DF	15	Mariana Lagos		(substituted on) 7'
FW	17	Consuelo de las Heras		(substituted on) 5'
	24	Sophia Lahsen		(substituted on) 11'
FW	26	Fernanda Arrieta		(substituted on) 5'
Coach:
(Chile) Diego Amoroso

== Final standings ==
As per statistical convention in field hockey, matches decided in extra time are counted as wins and losses, while matches decided by penalty shoot-outs are counted as draws.

Pos	Team	Pld	W	D	L	GF	GA	GD	Pts	Status
1st place, gold medalist(s)	Argentina	4	4	0	0	17	2	+15	12	Qualified for the 2022 FIH World Cup
2nd place, silver medalist(s)	Chile (H)	5	2	1	2	18	9	+9	7	Qualified for the 2022 FIH World Cup
3rd place, bronze medalist(s)	Canada	6	3	1	2	30	7	+23	10	Qualified for the 2022 FIH World Cup
4	United States	5	3	1	1	40	3	+37	10	
5	Uruguay	4	1	1	2	6	11	−5	4	
6	Trinidad and Tobago	5	1	0	4	2	45	−43	3	
7	Peru	3	0	0	3	0	36	−36	0	

Source: FIH
(H) Hosts

== Awards ==
Top goalscorer	Player of the tournament	Goalkeeper of the tournament
(United States) Erin Matson	(Argentina) María José Granatto	(Chile) Claudia Schüler

== Goalscorers ==
There were 108 goals scored in 16 matches, for an average of 6.75 goals per match.

10 goals

- (United States) Erin Matson

7 goals

- (Canada) Brienne Stairs

6 goals

- (United States) Hope Rose

5 goals

- (United States) Danielle Grega
- (United States) Elizabeth Yeager

4 goals

- (Argentina) Agustina Gorzelany
- (Argentina) María José Granatto
- (Canada) Madison Thompson
- (Canada) Elise Wong
- (Chile) Denise Krimerman
- (United States) Lauren Moyer

3 goals

- (Canada) Thora Rae
- (Chile) Fernanda Arrieta
- (United States) Ashley Sessa

2 goals

- (Argentina) Agustina Albertario
- (Argentina) Jimena Cedrés
- (Canada) Jordyn Faiczak
- (Canada) Sara McManus
- (Canada) Madeline Secco
- (Canada) Amanda Woodcroft
- (Chile) María Maldonado
- (Chile) Manuela Urroz
- (United States) Amanda Magadan
- (United States) Sofia Southam

1 goal

- (Argentina) Agostina Alonso
- (Argentina) Celina di Santo
- (Argentina) Micaela Retegui
- (Argentina) Delfina Thome
- (Argentina) Eugenia Trinchinetti
- (Canada) Alison Lee
- (Canada) Karli Johansen
- (Canada) Anna Mollenhauer
- (Canada) Natalie Sourisseau
- (Chile) Doménica Ananías
- (Chile) Camila Caram
- (Chile) Sofía Filipek
- (Chile) Fernanda Flores
- (Chile) Consuelo de las Heras
- (Chile) Mariana Lagos
- (Chile) Francisca Tala
- (Trinidad and Tobago) Felicia King
- (Trinidad and Tobago) Kaitlyn Olton
- (Uruguay) Teresa Viana
- (United States) Karlie Kisha
- (United States) Alia Marshall
- (United States) Madeleine Zimmer

Source: FIH

== See also ==
- 2022 Men's Pan American Cup
