= Umstead =

Umstead is a surname. Notable people with the surname include:

- Casey Umstead (born 1996), American field hockey player
- Danelle Umstead (born 1972), American alpine skier
- William B. Umstead (1895–1954), American politician
