= Pilar Oliveros =

Uruguayan field hockey player

Personal information
- Full name: María del Pilar Oliveros
- Born: 5 October 2001 (age 24) Montevideo, Uruguay
- Height: 162 cm (5 ft 4 in)

Sport
- Sport: Field hockey
- Position: Midfield
National team
Years	Team	Caps	Goals
2021–	Uruguay U–21	4	(0)
2019–	Uruguay	14	(2)
Medal record
Women's field hockey
Representing Uruguay
Pan American Cup
Bronze medal – third place	2025 Montevideo	Team
South American Games
Bronze medal – third place	2026 Santa Fe	Team

María del Pilar Oliveros (born 5 October 2001) is a Uruguayan field hockey player.

== Personal life ==
Pilar Oliveros was born and raised in Montevideo, Uruguay.

She is currently studying at the University of Michigan.

== Career ==
=== Junior national team ===
Pilar Oliveros made her debut for the Uruguay U–21 team in 2021, at the Pan American Junior Championship in Santiago.

In 2022, she was named in the squad for the FIH Junior World Cup in Potchefstroom.

=== Las Cimarronas ===
Oliveros made her debut for Las Cimarronas in 2019. She was a member of the team at the FIH Series Finals in Hiroshima.

In 2019, she represented her country at the XVIII Pan American Games in Lima.

She returned to the side in 2022 for the postponed Pan American Cup in Santiago.
