= Francisca Tala =

Chilean field hockey player (born 1994)

Personal information
- Full name: Francisca Javiera Tala Zacarias
- Born: 20 October 1994 (age 31) Chile

Sport
- Sport: Field hockey
- Position: Midfielder
- Club: Alumni
National team
Years	Team	Caps	Goals
2013–	Chile	119	-
Medal record
Women's field hockey
Representing Chile
Pan American Games
Bronze medal – third place	2023 Santiago	Team
Pan American Cup
Silver medal – second place	2017 Lancaster
Silver medal – second place	2022 Santiago
South American Games
Silver medal – second place	2014 Santiago	Team
Bronze medal – third place	2018 Cochabamba	Team

Francisca Tala Zacarias (born 20 October 1994) is a Chilean field hockey player.

Tala has represented Chile at both junior and senior levels. She made her junior debut at the 2012 Pan-Am Junior Championship, and her senior debut two years later at a four-nation tournament in Santiago.

Tala has played for Chile at two South American Games, in Santiago 2014 and Cochabamba 2018. The team medalled at both events, winning silver in 2014 and bronze in 2018.

Tala was a member of the Chilean team at the 2017 Pan American Cup. They won a silver medal after a historic semi-final victory over the United States put the team in the final. The team ultimately lost to Argentina 4–1 in the final.
