= Anna Dessoye =

American field hockey player

Personal information
- Born: July 13, 1994 (age 32) Mountaintop, Pennsylvania, U.S.
- Height: 5 ft 6 in (168 cm)

Sport
- Sport: Field hockey
- Position: Midfielder
- Club: Valley Styx
National team
Years	Team	Caps	Goals
2013	United States U–21	6	(1)
2017–	United States	52	(3)
Medal record
Women's field hockey
Representing United States
Pan American Games
Bronze medal – third place	2019 Lima	Team

Anna Dessoye (born July 13, 1994) is a field hockey player from the United States, who plays as a midfielder.

== Personal life ==
Anna Dessoye was born in Mountaintop, Pennsylvania. She began playing hockey in the sixth grade. She also uses a Ritual Hockey stick.

Dessoye is a former student of the University of Maryland, where she majored in public health.

== Career ==
=== National teams ===
==== Under–21 ====
In 2013, Dessoye was a member of the United States U–21 side at the Junior World Cup, where the team finished seventh.

==== Senior team ====
Anna Dessoye made her senior international debut for the United States national team in 2017, during a test series against New Zealand in Christchurch.

In 2019, Dessoye was a member of the national team during the inaugural edition of the FIH Pro League. Later that year, she participated in the 2019 Pan American Games in Lima. At the tournament, she received her first major medal for her country after defeating Chile for the bronze.
