= Margaux Paolino =

American women's field hockey player (born 1997)

Personal information
- Born: July 1, 1997 (age 29) Villanova, Pennsylvania, U.S.
- Height: 5 ft 4 in (163 cm)

Sport
- Sport: Field hockey
- Position: Forward
- Club: Xcalibur FHC
National team
Years	Team	Caps	Goals
–	United States	12	-
Medal record
Pan American Games
Bronze medal – third place	2019 Lima	Team

Margaux Paolino (born July 1, 1997) is an American women's field hockey player. Paolino was added to the United States national team in 2018, following success in the national junior team.

Paolino first represented the United States junior national team in 2014 at a qualifying even for the 2014 Youth Olympic Games in Montevideo, Uruguay. In 2016, Paolino once again represented the junior national team at the 2016 Junior Pan American Cup and 2016 Junior World Cup.

Paolino made her debut for the United States senior team in 2018 in a test series against Canada in San Diego, California. Paolino was selected to compete in the 2018 Vitality Women's Hockey World Cup, The 2019 Pan-American Games and 2019 FIH Olympic Games Qualifier.

Margaux was named by Front Office Sports to their Rising 25 Class of 2023 in Sports for her work as a Senior Analyst Insights at Elevate Sports Ventures.
