= Holly Stewart =

Canadian field hockey player

Personal information
- Full name: Holly Janet Stewart
- Born: 18 May 1993 (age 33) North Vancouver, Canada

Sport
- Sport: Field hockey
- Position: Forward
National team
Years	Team	Caps	Goals
2013–	Canada	55	-
Medal record
Women's field hockey
Representing Canada
Pan American Games
Silver medal – second place	2019 Lima	Team
Bronze medal – third place	2015 Toronto	Team

Holly Janet Stewart (born 18 May 1993) is a Canadian women's field hockey player.

== Playing career ==
=== Senior National Team ===
Stewart first represented Canada in 2013, in a test match against Ireland. Stewart's first major tournament in the Canada team was the 2014 Commonwealth Games in Glasgow, Scotland. The team finished eighth in the tournament.

In 2015, Stewart represented Canada at the 2015 Pan American Games, where the team finished third, winning the bronze medal. She was also a member of the team at the 2019 Pan American Games where they won a silver medal.

=== Junior National Team ===
Stewart first represented the junior national team in 2012, at the Junior Pan American Cup. The team won silver at the tournament, and qualified for the 2013 Junior World Cip, where Stewart also played.
