= Kim Jacob =

Chilean field hockey player (born 1996)

Personal information
- Full name: Kim Jacob Pizarro
- Born: 5 August 1996 (age 29) Chile

Sport
- Sport: Field hockey
- Position: Attacker
- Club: Manquehue
National team
Years	Team	Caps	Goals
2014–	Chile	41	-
Medal record
Women's field hockey
Representing Chile
Pan American Cup
Silver medal – second place	2017 Lancaster
Silver medal – second place	2022 Santiago
South American Games
Bronze medal – third place	2018 Cochabamba	Team

Kim Jacob Pizarro (born 5 August 1996) is a Chilean field hockey player.

Jacob first represented Chile in the national senior team in 2014, in a test series against Japan. Jacob went on to also represent the Chilean junior team at the 2016 Junior Pan American Cup and the 2016 Junior World Cup.

Jacob was part of the Chile team at the 2017 Pan American Cup. At the tournament, Chile recorded a historic 4–3 victory over the United States.
