= Katherine Wright (field hockey) =

Canadian field hockey player (born 1989)

Kate Wright
Personal information
- Full name: Katherine Wright
- Born: Katherine Gillis; 14 August 1989 (age 37) Kingston, Ontario, Canada
- Height: 173 cm (5 ft 8 in)
- Weight: 63 kg (139 lb)

Sport
- Sport: Field hockey
- Position: Attacker
National team
Years	Team	Caps	Goals
2008–	Canada	228	-
Medal record
Women's field hockey
Representing Canada
Pan American Games
Silver medal – second place	2019 Lima	Team
Bronze medal – third place	2015 Toronto	Team
Pan American Cup
Bronze medal – third place	2013 Mendoza	Team

Katherine "Kate" Wright (née Gillis) is a women's field hockey player from Canada. Wright was born on August 14, 1989, in Kingston, Ontario, Canada.

Wright is the most capped player with the Canada national team, playing 216 matches. She surpassed the Stephanie Jameson's previous record of 169 matches at the 2017 Women's Pan American Cup. Wright has been captain of the national team since 2014.

Wright has represented Canada at two Commonwealth Games, in Glasgow 2014 and Gold Coast 2018. At the 2018 event, Wright captained Canada to their best finish in the tournament's history, coming in fifth place.

Wright has also once been named in the Pan American Elite Team by the Pan American Hockey Federation, in 2013.
