= Kelsey Bing =

American field hockey player

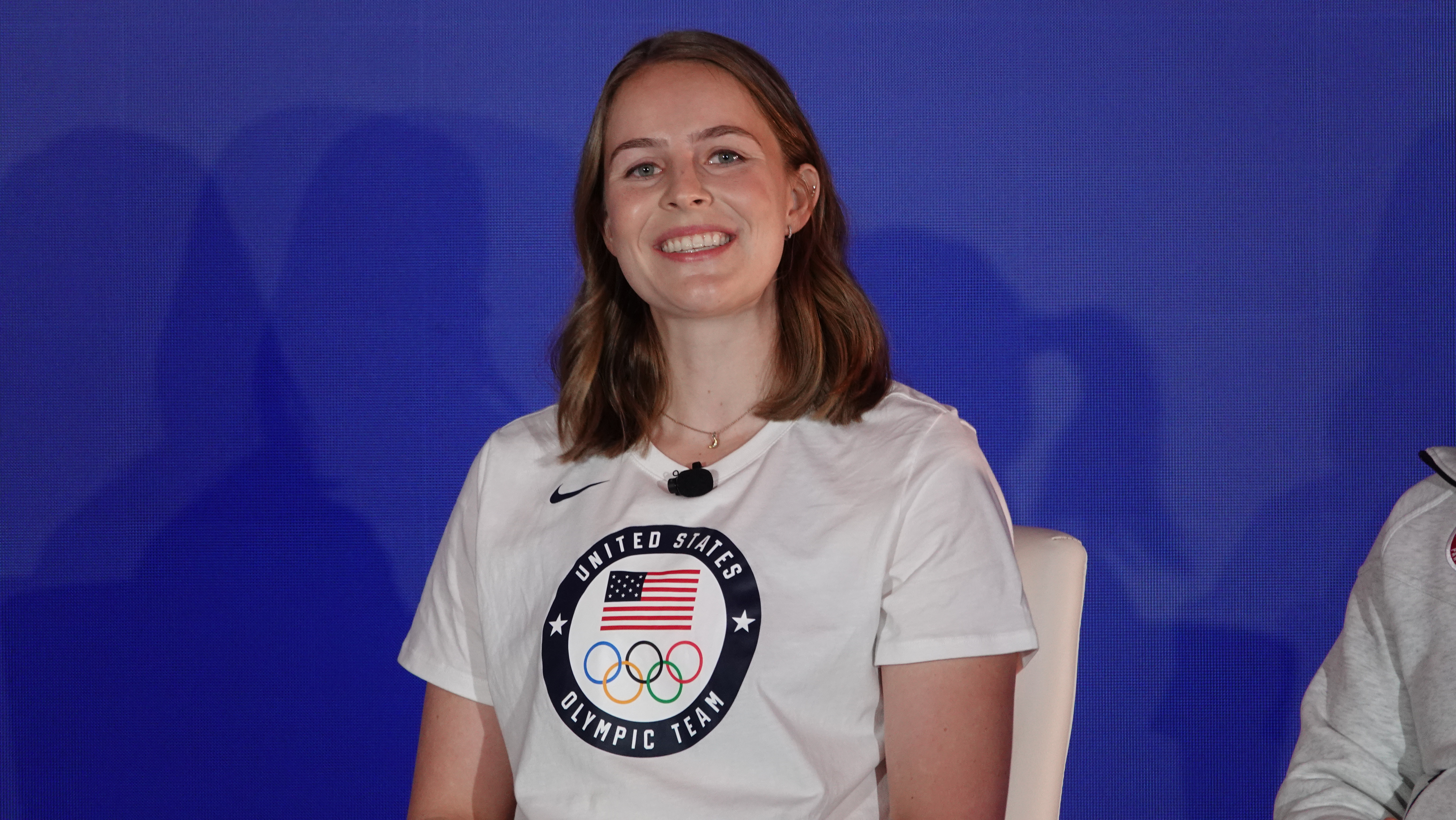
- Bing in April 2024

Personal information
- Full name: Kelsey McQuilkin Bing
- Born: October 1, 1997 (age 28) Houston, Texas, U.S.
- Height: 5 ft 10 in (178 cm)

Sport
- Sport: Field hockey
- Position: Goalkeeper
- Club: Texas Pride
National team
Years	Team	Caps	Goals
2014	United States U18	5	(0)
2014–2017	United States U21	12	(0)
2018–current	United States	95	(0)
Medal record
Women's field hockey
Representing United States
Pan American Games
Silver medal – second place	2023 Santiago	Team
Bronze medal – third place	2019 Lima	Team
Pan American Cup
Silver medal – second place	2025 Montevideo
Pan–Am Junior Championship
Silver medal – second place	2016 Tacarigua
Pan–Am Youth Championship
Bronze medal – third place	2014 Montevideo

Kelsey McQuilkin Bing (born October 1, 1997) is an American field hockey player.

== Personal life ==
Kelsey Bing was born and raised in Houston, Texas. She started playing hockey in middle school.

Bing is a former student-athlete at Stanford University where she studied mechanical engineering. Bing was named to the United States women's national team after a successful junior national team career.

== Career ==
=== Junior National Team ===
In 2013, Bing was first named to a junior national team. She played for the United States under-18 team at a qualifier for the 2014 Youth Olympic Games in Nanjing, China. The team won a bronze medal.

Bing represented the United States Under 21 side at the 2016 Pan-Am Junior Championship, a qualifier for the Junior World Cup. The team qualified for the 2016 Junior World Cup, where Bing was also a member of the squad.

=== Senior National Team ===
Bing made her senior international debut in 2018 in a test series against Belgium. Bing has been a regular inclusion in the United States team since her debut. She has played in all five editions of the FIH Pro League (2019-2024). Bing was nominated for the 2023 FIH Hockey Stars Awards Women's Goalkeeper of the Year. This nomination recognized Bing as one of the top five goalkeepers in the world in 2023.

Most recently, Bing competed with the US Women's National Team in the 2023 Panamerican Games in Santiago, Chile, where the team earned a silver medal. Bing and the US Women's National Team qualified for the 2024 Paris Olympics at the FIH Olympic Qualifiers in Ranchi, India, with a second-place finish after topping higher ranked New Zealand, India, and Japan. Bing was named "Goalkeeper of the Tournament."
