= Karli Johansen =

Canadian field hockey player

Personal information
- Full name: Karli Johansen
- Born: 26 March 1992 (age 34) North Vancouver, Canada

Sport
- Sport: Field hockey
- Position: Defender
National team
Years	Team	Caps	Goals
2013–	Canada	145	(36)
Medal record
Women's field hockey
Representing Canada
Pan American Games
Silver medal – second place	2019 Lima	Team
Bronze medal – third place	2015 Toronto	Team
Pan American Cup
Bronze medal – third place	2022 Santiago

Karli Johansen (born 26 March 1992) is a women's field hockey player from Canada.

Johansen made her senior international debut in 2013, and has been a member of the Canadian women's national team since. She has represented her country at three Commonwealth Games, in Glasgow 2014 and Gold Coast 2018 and Birmingham 2022.

Johansen was an instrumental member of the Canadian junior team, helping the team to silver at the 2012 Junior Pan American Cup, in Guadalajara, Mexico. The team then qualified for the 2013 Junior World Cup in Mönchengladbach, Germany, where Johansen co-captained the team to a fourteenth-place finish.

Following the 2017 Pan American Cup, Johansen was named in the 2017 Pan American Elite Team by the Pan American Hockey Federation.
