= Claudia Schüler =

Chilean field hockey player (1987–2023)

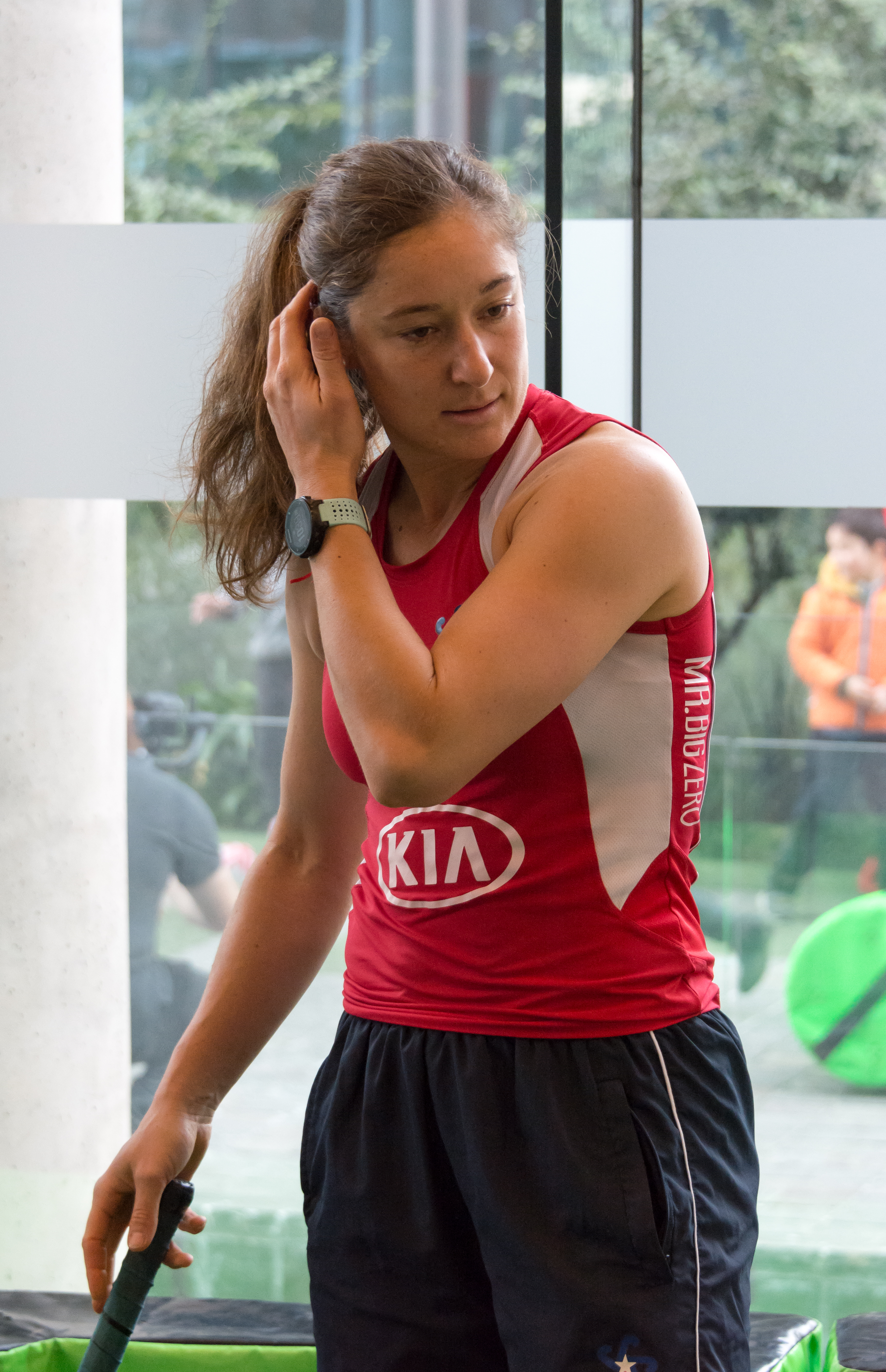
- Schüler in 2019

Personal information
- Full name: Claudia Andrea Schüler Hillmer
- Born: 28 November 1987 Chile
- Died: 26 March 2023 (aged 35)

Sport
- Sport: Field hockey
- Position: Goalkeeper
- Club: Manquehue
National team
Years	Team	Caps	Goals
2004–2022	Chile	235	-
Medal record
Women's field hockey
Representing Chile
Pan American Games
Bronze medal – third place	2011 Guadalajara	Team
Pan American Cup
Silver medal – second place	2017 Lancaster
Silver medal – second place	2022 Santiago
Bronze medal – third place	2009 Hamilton
South American Games
Silver medal – second place	2014 Santiago	Team
Bronze medal – third place	2018 Cochabamba	Team

Claudia Schüler (28 November 1987 – 26 March 2023) was a Chilean field hockey player.

Schüler represented Chile since her national debut in 2004.

Schüler made her junior debut at the 2005 Junior World Cup held in her home country, Chile, a year after her debut for the national senior team.

Schüler was instrumental in Chile's successes at the Pan American Cup. She has been given the goalkeeper of the tournament award at four consecutive editions of the tournament, in 2009, 2013, 2017 and 2022.

Following the 2017 Pan American Cup, Schüler was named goalkeeper of the 2017 Pan American Elite Team by the Pan American Hockey Federation. This is Schüler's third appearance as goalkeeper in the elite team, following 2009 and 2013.

In August 2022, she was diagnosed with liver cancer with metastases and she died on 26 March 2023, at the age of 35.
