= Consuelo de las Heras =

Chilean field hockey player

Personal information
- Full name: María Consuelo de las Heras Skoknić
- Born: 22 September 1995 (age 30) Viña del Mar, Chile

Sport
- Sport: Field hockey
- Position: Forward
- Club: Club Old Reds
National team
Years	Team	Caps	Goals
2016	Chile U21	12	(2)
2016–	Chile	62	(21)
Medal record
Women's field hockey
Representing Chile
Pan American Cup
Silver medal – second place	2022 Santiago
Pan-Am Junior Championship
Bronze medal – third place	2016 Tacarigua

María Consuelo de las Heras Skoknić (born 22 September 1995) is a Chilean field hockey player.

== Personal life ==
De las Heras was born and raised in Viña del Mar, and is the only member of the Chilean national team from the area.

She references Chilean teammate Carolina García, Rafael Nadal and Carli Lloyd as her sporting idols.

== Career ==
Consuelo de las Heras has represented Chile at both senior and junior level, debuting in both divisions in 2016.

=== Junior National Team ===
In 2016, De las Heras represented the Chile Under 21 side at the Pan-Am Junior Championship, where she scored two goals in the teams bronze medal campaign.

She later represented the team at the Junior World Cup, where the team finished in 11th place.

=== Senior National Team ===
De las Heras first represented the senior national team at the 2016–17 FIH World League Round 1 in Chiclayo, Peru.

Following her debut, De las Heras suffered an anterior cruciate ligament injury in 2017, ruling her out of competition for over a year. She returned to the national team in 2018, and has been a regular inclusion in the squad since her recovery.

==== International goals ====
Goal	Date	Location	Opponent	Score	Result	Competition	Ref.
1	6 October 2016	Cancha de Hockey, Chiclayo, Peru	Paraguay	1–0	8–0	2016–17 FIH World League Round 1	
2	1 April 2017	West Vancouver FHC, West Vancouver, Canada	T&T	5–0	9–1	2016–17 FIH World League Round 2	
3	27 January 2019	Prince of Wales Country Club, Santiago, Chile	United States	3–0	3–2	Test Match	
4	15 June 2019	Hiroshima Hockey Stadium, Hiroshima, Japan	Mexico	2–0	7–0	2018–19 FIH Series Finals	
5	15 June 2019	Hiroshima Hockey Stadium, Hiroshima, Japan	Mexico	6–0	7–0	2018–19 FIH Series Finals	
6	16 June 2019	Hiroshima Hockey Stadium, Hiroshima, Japan	Japan	3–1	3–1	2018–19 FIH Series Finals	
7	20 June 2019	Hiroshima Hockey Stadium, Hiroshima, Japan	Uruguay	5–1	5–2	2018–19 FIH Series Finals	
8	23 June 2019	Hiroshima Hockey Stadium, Hiroshima, Japan	Russia	1–0	3–3 (3–1)	2018–19 FIH Series Finals	
9	23 June 2019	Hiroshima Hockey Stadium, Hiroshima, Japan	Russia	3–1	3–3 (3–1)	2018–19 FIH Series Finals	
10	29 July 2019	Villa Maria del Triunfo, Lima, Peru	Peru	8–0	13–0	2019 Pan American Games	
11	31 July 2019	Villa Maria del Triunfo, Lima, Peru	United States	1–0	2–4	2019 Pan American Games	
12	9 August 2019	Villa Maria del Triunfo, Lima, Peru	United States	1–1	1–5	2019 Pan American Games	
