= Taylor West =

American field hockey player

Personal information
- Full name: Taylor Louise West
- Born: December 13, 1993 (age 32) Princess Anne, MD., United States

Sport
- Sport: Field hockey
- Position: Attacker
National team
Years	Team	Caps	Goals
2016–	United States	64	(15)
Medal record
Women's field hockey
Representing United States
Pan American Cup
Bronze medal – third place	2017 Lancaster	Team

Taylor Louise West (born December 13, 1993) is a women's field hockey player from the United States. West was raised to the United States national team in 2016, from the development squad.

West's most notable performance with the team was at the 2016-17 Hockey World League Semifinals in Johannesburg, South Africa. West scored an equalising goal against Germany with two minutes remaining in the final, sending the game to a penalty shoot-out which the United States eventually won.

West was also a member of the national team at the 2017 Pan American Cup where the team won a bronze medal.
