= Mariana Lagos =

Chilean field hockey player (born 1992)

Personal information
- Full name: Mariana De Jesús Lagos
- Born: 29 August 1992 (age 33) Chile

Sport
- Sport: Field hockey
- Position: Defender
- Club: Zehlendorfer Wespen
Senior career
Years	Team	Caps	Goals
–2024	Manquehue	-	-
2024–	Zehlendorfer Wespen	-	-
National team
Years	Team	Caps	Goals
2013–	Chile	71	-
Medal record
Women's field hockey
Representing Chile
Pan American Cup
Silver medal – second place	2022 Santiago
South American Championships
Silver medal – second place	2013 Santiago

Mariana De Jesús Lagos (born 29 August 1992) is a Chilean field hockey player. She plays for German club Zehlendorfer Wespen.

== Career ==
=== Club hockey ===
In August 2024, Lagos moved to Germany to play for Zehlendorfer Wespen.

=== National team ===
Lagos made her senior international debut for Chile in 2013. In the same year, she won silver with the team at the 2013 South American Championships in Santiago, Chile.

Since making her debut in 2013, Lagos has remained a regular inclusion in the women's side, most recently representing Chile in a 2018 test series against the United States.

In September 2018, Lagos was named in the SA Suns team to represent South Australia at the 2018 Australian Hockey League.
