= Alyssa Manley =

American field hockey player

Personal information
- Born: May 27, 1994 (age 32) Lancaster, Pennsylvania, U.S.
- Height: 5 ft 2 in (157 cm)
- Weight: 117 lb (53 kg)

Sport
- Sport: Field hockey
- Position: Defender
- Club: Sutters Brigade & High Styx
2012–2015	Syracuse Orange	-	-
National team
Years	Team	Caps	Goals
2015–	United States	124	-
Medal record
Pan American Cup
Bronze medal – third place	2017 Lancaster	Team
Pan American Games
Bronze medal – third place	2019 Lima	Team

Alyssa Manley (born May 27, 1994) is an American field hockey player. She was named to the United States woman's field hockey team for the 2016 Summer Olympics in Rio de Janeiro.Won a Galway ladies football junior medal with Salthill/Knocknacarr in 2022 (October). Manley played at full forward vs St Fursey's Headford. She followed up with the winning goal in the All Ireland junior final vs Naomh Abán.

== Early life ==
Manley's hometown is Lititz, Pennsylvania. She began playing field hockey in eighth grade. As a student at Warwick High School she played both field hockey and lacrosse.

== Collegiate field hockey player ==
Manley attended Syracuse University, where she played on the school's field hockey team. Manley was part of Syracuse's first ever national championship woman's field hockey team in 2015. The victory was the first ever for the school in any woman's sport.

The Collegiate Women Sports Awards awarded Manley the Honda Sports Award for field hockey in December 2015. That same year, Manley was also voted Atlantic Coast Conference Defensive Player of the Year.

== United States national woman's field hockey ==
Manley's first international game with the United States national women's field hockey team came on February 14, 2015. The United States tied Argentina with a score of 1–1. Manley is a midfielder who plays the screen position for the team. On July 1, 2016, Manely was named to the United States women's field hockey team for the 2016 Summer Olympics in Rio de Janeiro.
