= Julia Young (field hockey) =

American field hockey player

Personal information
- Born: May 8, 1995 (age 31)
- Height: 5 ft 6 in (168 cm)

Sport
- Sport: Field hockey
- Position: Defender
- Club: Focus Field Hockey
National team
| Years | Team | Caps | Goals |
| 2017– | United States | 26 | - |
Medal record
Pan American Games
| Bronze medal – third place | 2019 Lima | Team |

Julia Young (born May 8, 1995) is an American field hockey player for the American national team.

She participated at the 2018 Women's Hockey World Cup.
