= Mariana Pineda (field hockey) =

Argentine field hockey player

Personal information
- Born: 3 January 2001 (age 25) Buenos Aires, Argentina

Sport
- Sport: Field hockey
- Position: Midfielder
- Club: Vélez
Senior career
Years	Team	Caps	Goals
Present	Vélez	-	-
National team
Years	Team	Caps	Goals
2021–Present	Argentina	0	-

Mariana Pineda (born 3 January 2001) is an Argentine field hockey player.

== Hockey career ==
In 2021, Pineda was called into the senior national women's team.
