= Inés Delpech =

Argentine field hockey player

Personal information
- Born: 27 August 1994 (age 31) Tandil, Argentina

Sport
- Sport: Field hockey
- Position: Defender
- Club: Liceo Naval
Senior career
Years	Team	Caps	Goals
–2012	Los Cardos	-	-
2013–2018	Kent State	-	-
2018-Present	Liceo Naval	-	-
National team
Years	Team	Caps	Goals
2020–Present	Argentina	5	(2)
Medal record
South American Games
Silver medal – second place	2022 Asunción

Inés Delpech (born 27 August 1994) is an Argentine field hockey player.

== Hockey career ==
In 2020, Delpech was called into the senior national women's team.
