= Giselle Kañevsky =

Argentine field hockey player

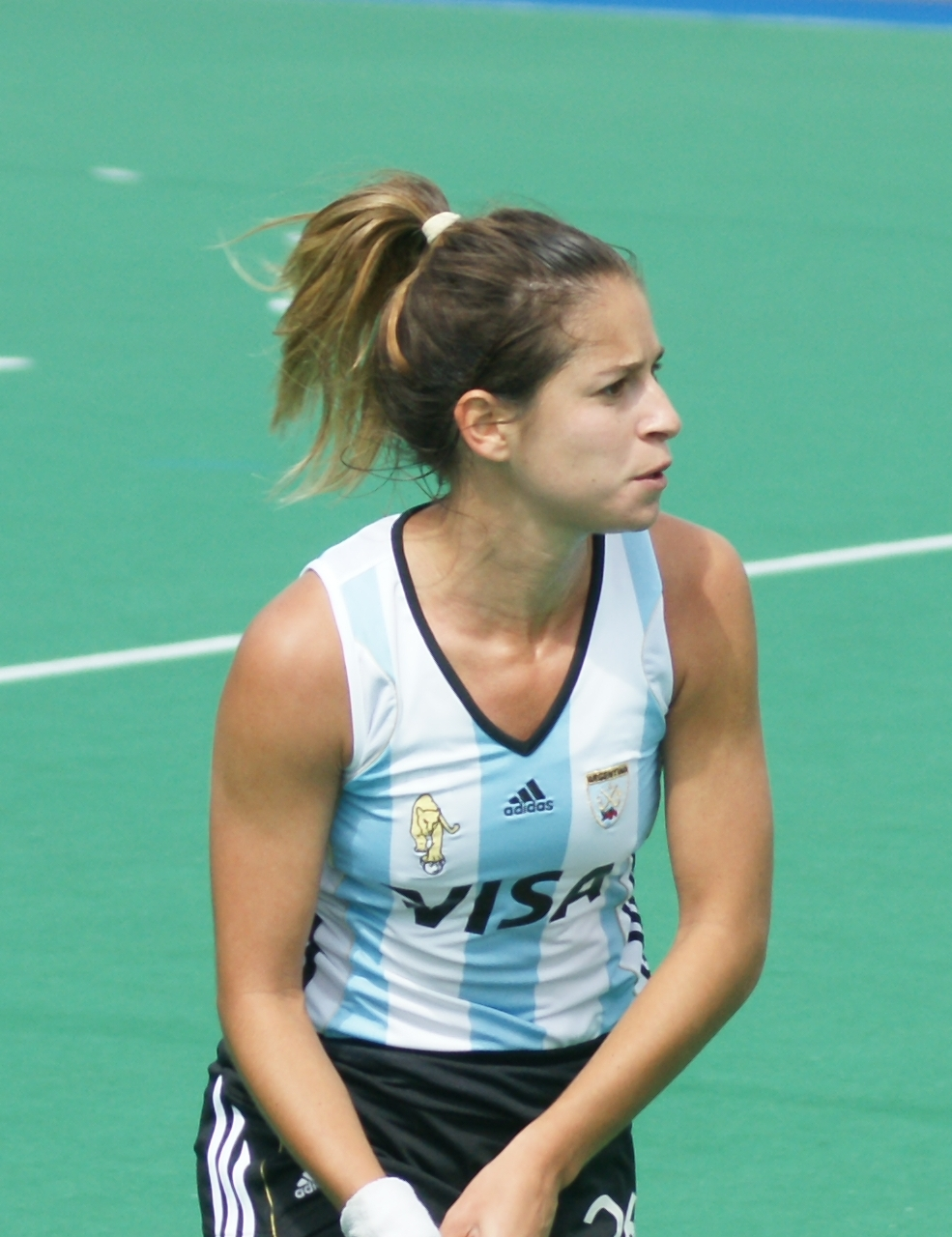

Personal information
- Full name: Giselle Andrea Kañevsky
- Born: August 4, 1985 (age 41) Buenos Aires, Argentina
- Height: 1.62 m (5 ft 4 in)

Sport
- Sport: Field hockey
- Position: Defender
Youth career
- Team
- –: Hacoaj
Senior career
Years	Team	Caps	Goals
???–Present	Hacoaj	-	-
National team
Years	Team	Caps	Goals
2005	Argentina U21		-
2006–2011, 2019-2020	Argentina	134	-
Medal record
Women's field hockey
Representing Argentina
Summer Olympics
Bronze medal – third place	2008 Beijing	Team
World Cup
Gold medal – first place	2010 Rosario	Team
Bronze medal – third place	2006 Madrid	Team
Champions Trophy
Gold medal – first place	2009 Sydney	Team
Gold medal – first place	2010 Nottingham	Team
Silver medal – second place	2007 Quilmes	Team
Silver medal – second place	2011 Amstelveen	Team
Pan American Games
Gold medal – first place	2007 Rio de Janeiro	Team
Gold medal – first place	2019 Lima	Team
Pan American Cup
Gold medal – first place	2009 Hamilton	Team
- Updated on October 6, 2012

Giselle Andrea Kañevsky (born August 4, 1985, in Buenos Aires) is an Argentine field hockey player who plays as a defender on the Argentina national team.

Kañevsky is Jewish. She started playing hockey at age seven in Los Cardales Club, moving to Náutico Hacoaj three years later. In 2005, she was part of the National Junior Championship, and a year later had her debut with the senior team, finishing third at the World Cup.

In August 2008, she won the bronze medal with the national field hockey team at the 2008 Summer Olympics in Beijing. In September of the same year she moved to the Netherlands to play with the team of Haagsche Delftsche Mixed Hockey Club (HDM). In 2010, she won the World Cup held in Rosario, Argentina.

In 2019, she returned to the national team after an eight-year gap under the coaching of Carlos Retegui.

== See also ==
- List of select Jewish field hockey players
