= Silvina D'Elía =

Argentine field hockey player

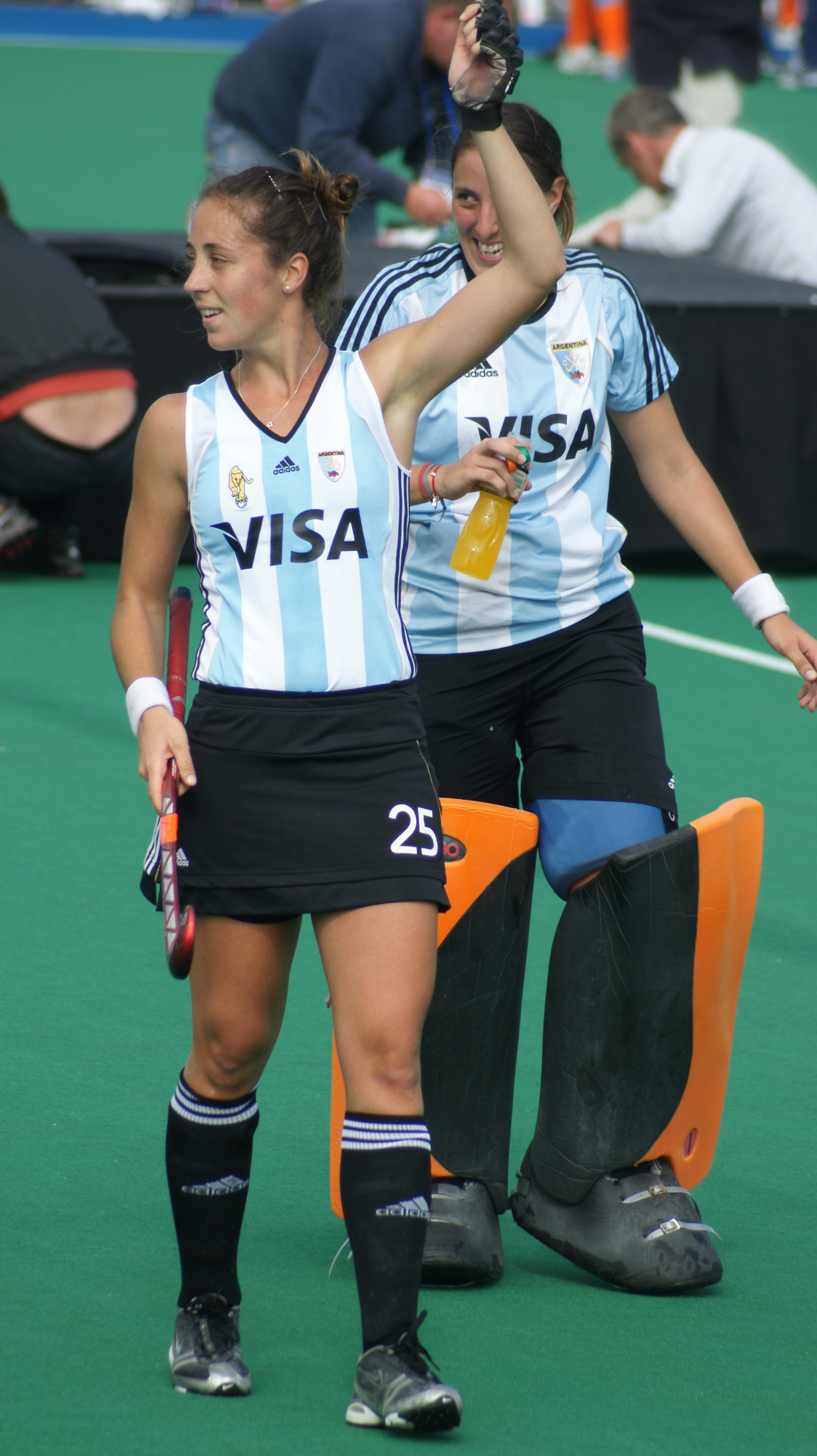
- Image of Maria Silvina D'Elia

Personal information
- Full name: María Silvina D'Elía
- Born: 25 April 1986 (age 40) Mendoza, Argentina
- Height: 1.73 m (5 ft 8 in)

Sport
- Sport: Field hockey
- Position: Defender
- Club: Marista
Youth career
- Team
- –: Marista
Senior career
Years	Team	Caps	Goals
???–2007	Marista	-	-
2007–2017	GEBA	-	-
2018	BBHC	-	-
2019	GEBA	-	-
2021	Marista	-	-
National team
Years	Team	Caps	Goals
2003–2005	Argentina U21		-
2003–2019	Argentina	219	-
Medal record
Women's Field hockey
Representing Argentina
Summer Olympics
Silver medal – second place	2012 London	Team
World Cup
Gold medal – first place	2010 Rosario	Team
Bronze medal – third place	2014 The Hague	Team
Champions Trophy
Gold medal – first place	2008 Mönchengladbach	Team
Gold medal – first place	2009 Sydney	Team
Gold medal – first place	2010 Nottingham	Team
Gold medal – first place	2012 Rosario	Team
Gold medal – first place	2014 Mendoza	Team
Silver medal – second place	2007 Quilmes	Team
Silver medal – second place	2011 Amstelveen	Team
Pan American Games
Gold medal – first place	2019 Lima	Team
Silver medal – second place	2011 Guadalajara	Team
Pan American Cup
Gold medal – first place	2009 Hamilton	Team
Gold medal – first place	2013 Mendoza	Team

María Silvina D'Elía (born 25 April 1986) is an Argentine field hockey player. At the 2012 Summer Olympics, she competed for the Argentina national field hockey team. Silvina won the 2010 World Cup, five Champions Trophy, the silver medal at the 2012 Summer Olympics in London and two Pan American Cups.

D'Elía was called up in May 2017 by Agustín Corradini to come back to Las Leonas. She first accepted to join, but two weeks later, she declined the offer. Then she was called up by Carlos Retegui to take part in the 2019 team.
