= Fernanda Flores =

Chilean field hockey player (born 1993)

Personal information
- Full name: Fernanda Flores Cariola
- Born: 14 September 1993 (age 32) Santiago, Chile

Sport
- Sport: Field hockey
- Club: Universidad Católica
Medal record
Representing Chile
Pan American Games
Bronze medal – third place	2023 Santiago	Team
Pan American Cup
Silver medal – second place	2017 Lancaster	Team
FIH Nations Cup
Bronze medal – third place	2023–24 Terrassa	Team
South American Games
Silver medal – second place	2014 Santiago	Team
Bronze medal – third place	2018 Cochabamba	Team

Fernanda Flores Cariola (born 14 September 1993) is a Chilean field hockey player.

Flores has been part of both the Chile junior and senior national teams. She made her junior debut at the 2012 Pan-Am Junior Championship, and her senior debut a year earlier in 2011.

Flores has medalled with the national team at twoSouth American Games, in Santiago in 2014 and Cochabamba in 2018. She also won a historic silver medal with the team at the 2017 Pan American Cup in Lancaster.
