= Rosario Luchetti =

Argentine field hockey player

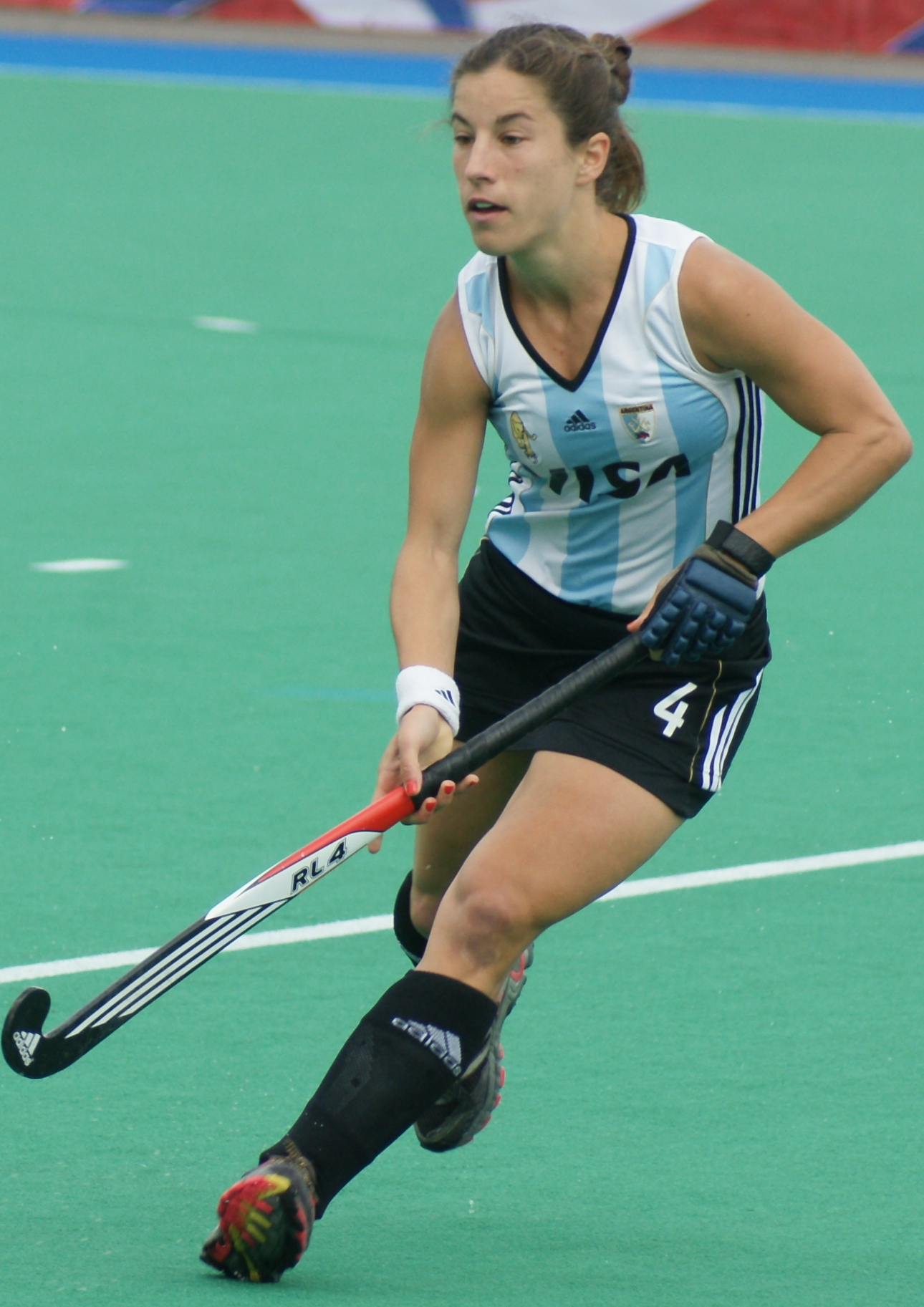

Personal information
- Born: June 4, 1984 (age 42) Buenos Aires, Argentina
- Height: 1.61 m (5 ft 3 1/2 in)

Sport
- Sport: Field hockey
- Position: Midfielder
- Club: Belgrano Athletic Club
Senior career
Years	Team	Caps	Goals
–	Belgrano Athletic Club	-	-
National team
Years	Team	Caps	Goals
2005	Argentina U21		-
2005–	Argentina	255	-
Medal record
Women's field hockey
Representing Argentina
Summer Olympics
Silver medal – second place	2012 London	Team
Bronze medal – third place	2008 Beijing	Team
World Cup
Gold medal – first place	2010 Rosario	Team
Bronze medal – third place	2006 Madrid	Team
Bronze medal – third place	2014 The Hague	Team
Champions Trophy
Gold medal – first place	2008 Mönchengladbach	Team
Gold medal – first place	2009 Sydney	Team
Gold medal – first place	2010 Nottingham	Team
Gold medal – first place	2012 Rosario	Team
Gold medal – first place	2014 Mendoza	Team
Silver medal – second place	2007 Quilmes	Team
Silver medal – second place	2011 Amstelveen	Team
Pan American Games
Gold medal – first place	2007 Rio de Janeiro	Team
Gold medal – first place	2019 Lima	Team
Silver medal – second place	2011 Guadalajara	Team
Pan American Cup
Gold medal – first place	2009 Bermuda	Team
Gold medal – first place	2013 Mendoza	Team

Rosario Luchetti (born 4 June 1984) is an Argentine field hockey player, who won the bronze medal at the 2008 Summer Olympics in Beijing and the silver medal at the 2012 Olympic Games in London with the Argentina national women's hockey team.

Charito, as she is known, emerged from the youths of the Belgrano Athletic Club and debuted in Las Leonas (Argentina national field hockey team) at the 2005 Champions Trophy. In the course of her career, she won medals at major tournaments of international field hockey, such as the bronze medal at the 2008 Olympic Games in Beijing, the silver medal at the 2012 Olympic Games in London, the 2010 World Cup in Rosario, Argentina, the gold medal at the 2006 ODESUR Games and 2007 Pan American Games, five Champions Trophy and two Pan American Cups, among others.
