= Ashley Hoffman =

American women's field hockey player (born 1996)

Personal information
- Full name: Ashley Joy Hoffman
- Born: November 8, 1996 (age 29) Mohnton, Pennsylvania, U.S.

Sport
- Sport: Field hockey
- Position: Midfielder/Defender
- Club: hdm
Senior career
Years	Team	Caps	Goals
–2020	X-Calibur	-	-
2020–present	hdm	-	-
National team
Years	Team	Caps	Goals
2017–present	United States	73	-
Medal record
Women's field hockey
Representing United States
Pan American Cup
Bronze medal – third place	2017 Lancaster	Team
Pan American Games
Bronze medal – third place	2019 Lima	Team
FIH Olympic Qualifiers
Silver medal – second place	2024 Ranchi	Team

Ashley Joy Hoffman (born November 8, 1996) is an American women's field hockey player. Hoffman was raised to the United States national team in 2017, following success in the national junior team.

== Career ==
=== Junior national team ===
Hoffman first represented the United States junior national team in 2014 at a qualifying even for the 2014 Youth Olympic Games in Montevideo, Uruguay. In 2016, Hoffman once again represented the junior national team at the 2016 Junior Pan American Cup and 2016 Junior World Cup.

=== Senior national team ===
Hoffman made her debut for the United States senior team in March 2017 in a test series against New Zealand in Christchurch, New Zealand.

Hoffman was a member of the bronze medal winning team at the 2017 Women's Pan American Cup.

== College ==
In 2019, while at North Carolina, Hoffman won the Honda Sports Award as the nation's best female field hockey player.
