= Lauren Moyer =

American field hockey player (born 1995)

Personal information
- Born: May 13, 1995 (age 31) York, Pennsylvania, U.S.
- Height: 5 ft 6 in (168 cm)

Sport
- Sport: Field hockey
- Position: Forward
National team
Years	Team	Caps	Goals
2017–	United States	77	(10)
Medal record
Women's field hockey
Representing the United States
Pan American Cup
Bronze medal – third place	2017 Lancaster
Pan American Games
Bronze medal – third place	2019 Lima	Team

Lauren Moyer (born May 13, 1995) is an American field hockey player for the American national team. Moyer was raised to the United States national team in 2017, following success in the national junior team.

== Career ==
College

Attended the University of North Carolina at Chapel Hill from 2013 - 2017. The Tar Heels won 1 ACC Championship title in 2015 At UNC, Named to the All-ACC First Team, All-ACC Tournament Team, NCAA Division I All-Tournament Team, Longstreth/NFHCA All-South Region First Team, Named a Longstreth/NFHCA All-American.

Junior Women's National Team

Moyer first appearance on a Junior National Team occurred in 2012 when she was named to the U-19 Women National Team. Then in 2014 was named to the U.S. U-21 Women's National Team under Janneke Schopman

Major tournament appearances:

Silver - 2016 Women's Pan American Junior Championship(Trinidad & Tobago)

8th - 2016 Women's FIH Hockey Junior World Cup (Santiago, Chile)

Senior Women's National Team

Named to the squad in 2017, Moyer earned her first senior cap vs Ireland May 24 in a friendly series in Lancaster, Pennsylvania. Major tournaments played in since 2017:

2020 Women's FIH Pro League (International competition)

Gold - 2017 World League Semifinals (Johannesburg, South Africa)

Bronze - 2019 Pan American Games (Lima, Peru)

Bronze - 2017 Pan American Cup (Lancaster, Pa.)

7th - 2017 World League Final (Auckland, New Zealand)

9th - 2019 Women's FIH Pro League (worldwide)

14th - 2018 Women's Hockey World Cup (London, England)

2019 FIH Hockey Olympic Qualifier (Bhubaneswar, India)
