= Danielle Grega =

American field hockey player

Personal information
- Born: July 2, 1996 (age 30) Kingston, Pennsylvania, U.S.
- Height: 5 ft 3 in (160 cm)

Sport
- Sport: Field hockey
- Position: Forward
National team
Years	Team	Caps	Goals
2018–	United States	19	(7)
Medal record
Women's field hockey
Representing United States
Pan American Games
Bronze medal – third place	2019 Lima	Team
FIH Olympic Qualifiers
Silver medal – second place	2024 Ranchi	Team

Danielle Grega (born July 2, 1996) is an American field hockey player. Grega was named to the U.S. Women's National Team in 2018.

== Personal life ==
Grega was born in Kingston, Pennsylvania. She began playing hockey in her sixth year at school.

== Career ==
=== Senior National Team ===
Grega made her senior international debut in 2018 during a test series against Belgium.

Grega has been a regular inclusion in the United States team since her debut, most recently appearing in the 2019 FIH Pro League.

=== International Goals ===
Goal	Date	Location	Opponent	Score	Result	Competition	Ref.
1	November 27, 2018	Spooky Nook Sports, Lancaster, United States	Belgium	1–0	3–2	Test Match	
2	November 27, 2018	Spooky Nook Sports, Lancaster, United States	Belgium	2–1	3–2	Test Match	
3	March 2, 2019	Sydney Olympic Park, Sydney, Australia	Australia	1–0	1–2	2019 FIH Pro League	
4	March 8, 2019	North Harbour Hockey Stadium, Auckland, New Zealand	New Zealand	1–3	1–3	2019 FIH Pro League	
5	March 29, 2019	Spooky Nook Sports, Lancaster, United States	Belgium	1–1	1–1 (5–4)	2019 FIH Pro League	
6	June 22, 2019	Spooky Nook Sports, Lancaster, United States	Germany	1–0	2–3	2019 FIH Pro League	
7	July 29, 2019	Andres Avelino Caceres Sports Complex, Lima, Peru	Mexico	1–0	5–0	2019 Pan American Games	
