= Victoria Granatto =

Argentine field hockey player

- Granatto in September 2026

Personal information
- Full name: María Victoria Granatto
- Born: 9 April 1991 (age 35) Argentina
- Height: 163 cm (5 ft 4 in)
- Weight: 64 kg (141 lb)

Sport
- Sport: Field hockey
- Position: Forward
- Club: Santa Bárbara
National team
Years	Team	Caps	Goals
2019–	Argentina	87	(22)
Medal record
Olympic Games
Silver medal – second place	2020 Tokyo	Team
World Cup
Gold medal – first place	2026 Wavre/Amstelveen
Silver medal – second place	2022 Terrassa/Amstelveen
Pan American Games
Gold medal – first place	2019 Lima	Team
Pan American Cup
Gold medal – first place	2025 Montevideo

María Victoria Granatto (born 9 April 1991) is an Argentine field hockey player. She's an elder sister of Argentina's hockey player and teammate María José Granatto. She plays with the Argentina national field hockey team, winning silver medal at the 2020 Summer Olympics.

== Hockey career ==
In 2019, Granatto was called into the senior national women's team. She competed in the team that finished fourth at the 2019 Pro League in Amstelveen.

She won a gold medal at the 2019 Pan American Games in Lima.
