= Valentina Costa Biondi =

Argentine field hockey player (born 1995)

Valentina Isabel Costa Biondi
Personal information
- Born: 13 September 1995 (age 30) Bahía Blanca, Argentina
- Height: 163 cm (5 ft 4 in)
- Weight: 63 kg (139 lb)

Sport
- Sport: Field hockey
- Position: Defender
- Club: San Fernando
National team
Years	Team	Caps	Goals
2019–	Argentina	20	(2)
Medal record
Olympic Games
Silver medal – second place	2020 Tokyo	Team
World Cup
Silver medal – second place	2022 Terrassa/Amstelveen
Pan American Games
Gold medal – first place	2019 Lima	Team
Gold medal – first place	2023 Santiago	Team
Pan American Cup
Gold medal – first place	2022 Santiago

Valentina Isabel Costa Biondi (born 3 September 1995) is an Argentine field hockey player. She plays with the Argentina national field hockey team, winning silver medal at the 2020 Summer Olympics.

== Hockey career ==
In 2019, Costa Biondi was called into the senior national women's team. She competed in the team that finished fourth at the 2019 Pro League in Amstelveen.

She won a gold medal at the 2019 Pan American Games in Lima.
