= María José Granatto =

Argentine field hockey player

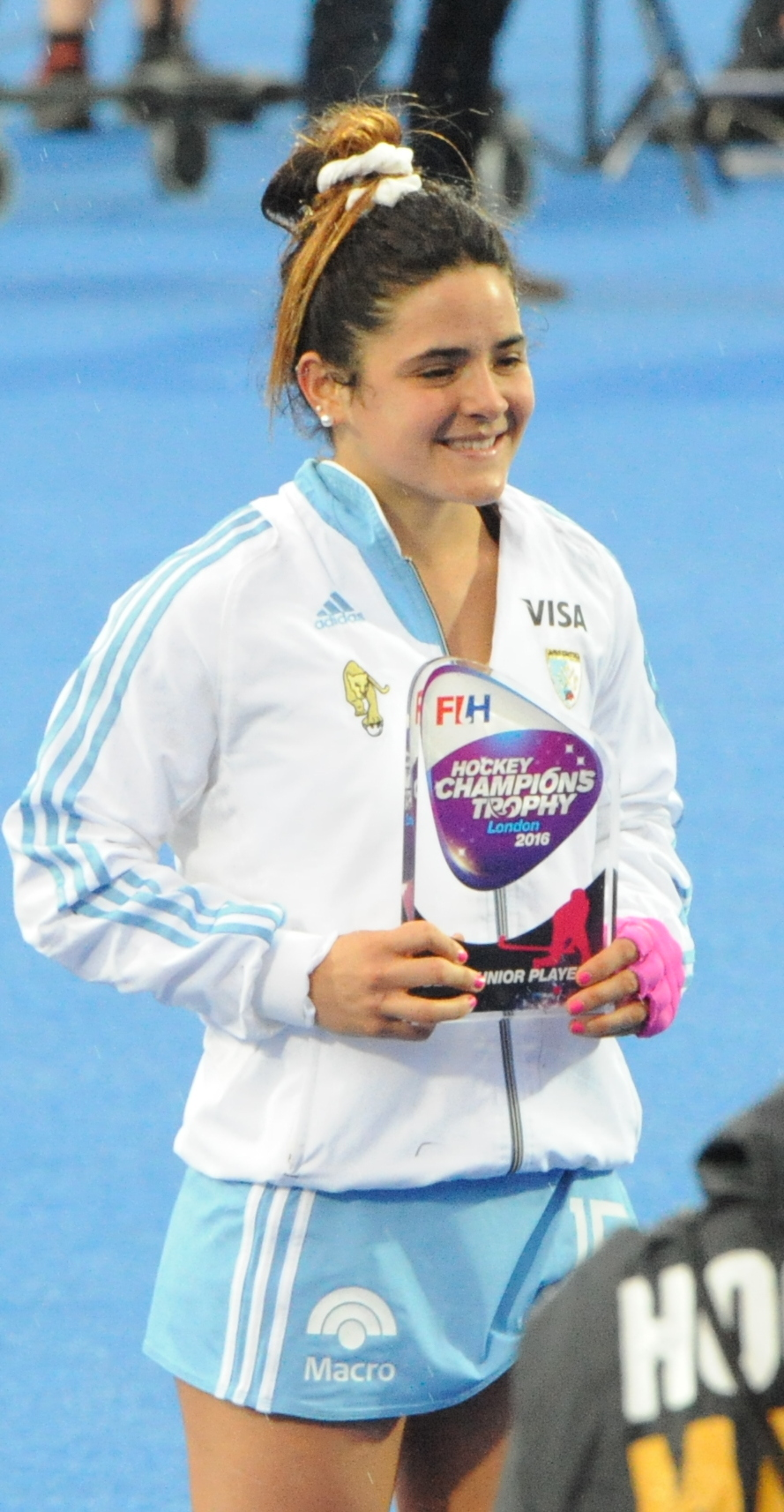
- Granatto at the 2016 Hockey Champions Trophy

Personal information
- Full name: María José Granatto
- Born: 21 April 1995 (age 31) La Plata, Argentina
- Height: 1.54 m (5 ft 1 in)
- Weight: 57 kg (126 lb)

Sport
- Sport: Field hockey
- Position: Forward
- Club: Club Santa Barbara
Senior career
| Years | Team | Caps | Goals |
| –2018 | Hc-oranje club | - | - |
| 2018–2019 | Club Santa Barbara | - | - |
| 2019– | Club Santa Barbara | - | - |
National team
| Years | Team | Caps | Goals |
| – | Argentina | 96 | (60) |
Medal record
Olympic Games
| Silver medal – second place | 2020 Tokyo | Team |
| Bronze medal – third place | 2024 Paris | Team |
World Cup
| Gold medal – first place | 2026 Wavre/Amstelveen |
| Silver medal – second place | 2022 Terrassa/Amstelveen |
World League
| Gold medal – first place | 2014-15 Rosario |
Champions Trophy
| Gold medal – first place | 2016 London |
| Bronze medal – third place | 2018 Changzhou |
Pan American Cup
| Gold medal – first place | 2017 Lancaster |
| Gold medal – first place | 2022 Santiago |
| Gold medal – first place | 2025 Montevideo |
Pan American Games
| Gold medal – first place | 2019 Lima | Team |
| Gold medal – first place | 2023 Santiago | Team |
Junior World Cup
| Gold medal – first place | 2016 Santiago |
| Silver medal – second place | 2013 Mönchengladbach |

María José Granatto (born 21 April 1995) is an Argentine field hockey player who plays as a forward for Argentine club Santa Bárbara Hockey Club and the Argentina national team. She is the younger sister of Argentina's hockey player and teammate Victoria Granatto.

She was part of the Argentine team at the 2016 Summer Olympics in Rio de Janeiro and won the silver medal at the 2020 Summer Olympics.

== Career ==
Her first gold medal with Argentina (Las Leonas) was in the 2014–15 Women's FIH Hockey World League. Then, she was part of the national team that won the gold medal at the 2016 Women's Hockey Champions Trophy. Later, she won a gold medal at the 2019 Pan American Games, and also at the 2023 Games.

She was part of the national squad that won the 2022 Pan American Cup, being elected as the best player of the tournament. In 2022 she also won the 2021-22 Hockey Pro League and the silver medal at the 2022 World Cup. In 2024, she won the bronze medal with Las Leonas at the 2024 Paris Summer Olympics.

On club level she plays for Club Santa Bárbara in Argentina. At the 2016 and 2017 Hockey Stars Awards she won the FIH Rising Star of the Year.

| Preceded by Lily Owsley | FIH Rising Star of the Year; 2016–2017 | Succeeded by Lucina von der Heyde |
