= Ali Froede =

American field hockey player

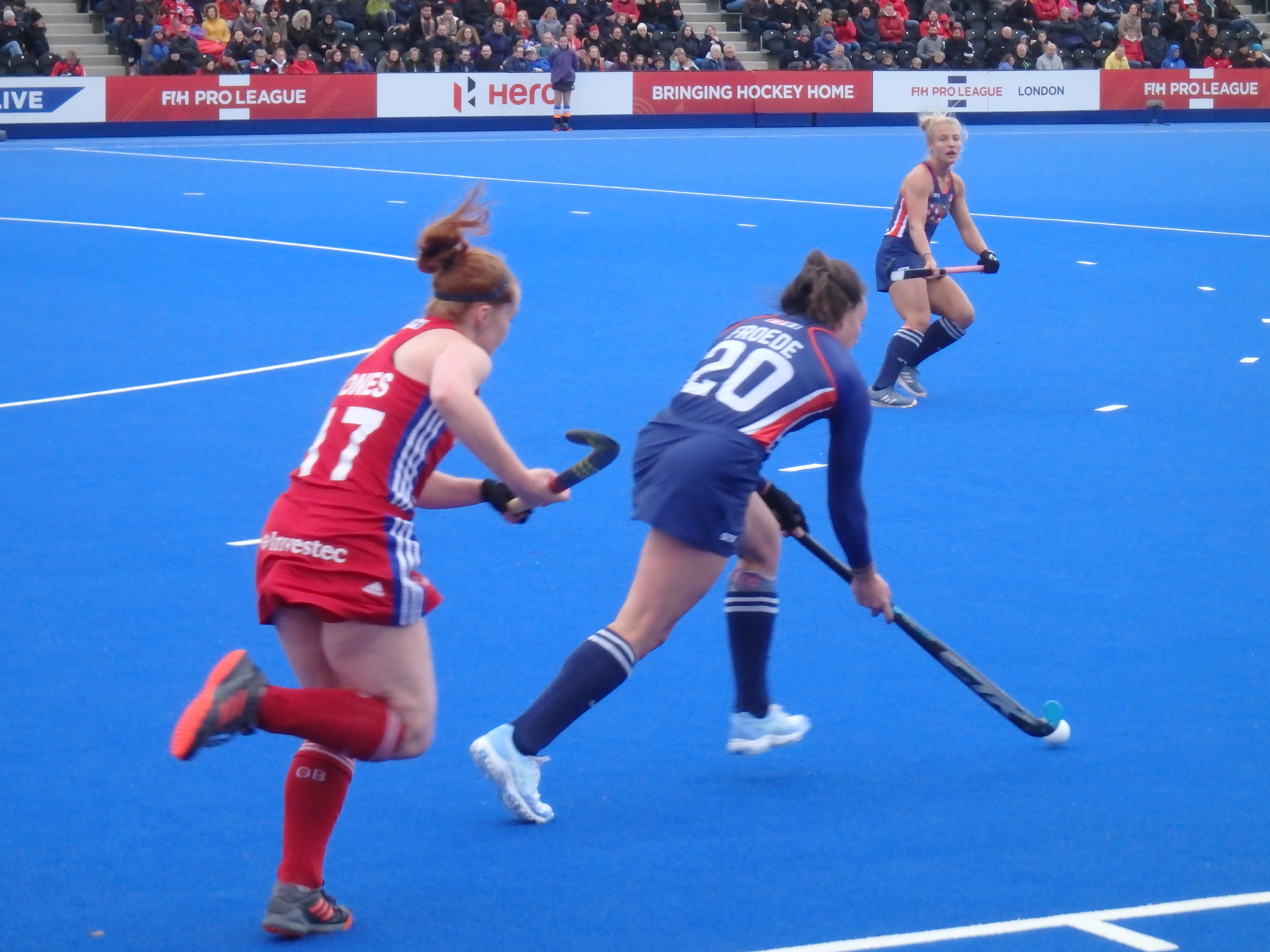
- Froede playing in the 2019 FIH Pro League

Personal information
- Full name: Alexandra Froede
- Born: April 8, 1993 (age 33) Warrenton, Virginia, U.S.

Sport
- Sport: Field hockey
- Position: Defender
- Club: Rampage
National team
Years	Team	Caps	Goals
2015–	United States	60	-
Medal record
Pan American Games
Bronze medal – third place	2019 Lima	Team

Alexandra "Ali" Froede (born April 8, 1993) is an American field hockey player for the United States national team.

She participated at the 2018 Women's Hockey World Cup.
