= Field hockey at the 2019 Pan American Games – Women's tournament =

Women's field hockey at the 2019 Pan American Games
Tournament details
- Host country: Peru
- City: Lima
- Dates: 29 July – 9 August
- Teams: 8 (from 1 confederation)

Final positions
- Champions: Argentina (7th title)
- Runner-up: Canada
- Third place: United States

Tournament statistics
- Matches played: 24
- Goals scored: 166 (6.92 per match)
- Top scorer: (Argentina) Julieta Jankunas (11 goals)

The Women's field hockey tournament at the 2019 Pan American Games will be the 9th edition of the field hockey event for women at the Pan American Games. It will take place over a twelve-day period beginning on 29 July, and culminated with the medal finals on 9 August.

The winner of this tournament will qualify for the 2020 Summer Olympics in Tokyo, Japan.

== Qualification ==
A total of eight women's teams qualified to compete at the games. The host nation (Peru) received automatic qualification. The top two teams at the 2018 Central American and Caribbean Games and 2018 South American Games also qualified. The top two teams not yet qualified from the 2017 Pan American Cup (after the results from the above two tournaments are taken into account) also qualified. If Canada and/or the United States have not qualified still, a playoff between the nations and the third-ranked at the Pan American Cups will take place. If both nations do qualify, the playoff will be not necessary and the third placed team at each Pan American Cup will qualify. The Pan American Hockey Federation (PAHF) officially announced the qualified teams on 10 September 2018.

=== Summary ===
| Event | Dates | Location | Quotas | Qualified |
|---|---|---|---|---|
| Host Nation | —N/a | —N/a | 1 | Peru |
| 2018 South American Games | 30 May – 7 June | (Bolivia) Cochabamba | 2 | Argentina; Uruguay |
| 2018 Central American and Caribbean Games | 20–28 July | (Colombia) Barranquilla | 2 | Cuba; Mexico |
| 2017 Women's Pan American Cup | 5–13 August | (United States) Lancaster | 3 | Canada*; Chile (15); United States |
| Total | | | 8 | |

- A playoff was not held, and Canada was automatically given the spot.

== Results ==
The official schedule was revealed on 10 January 2019.

All times are local (UTC−5).

=== Preliminary round ===
==== Pool A ====
| Pos | Team | Pld | W | D | L | GF | GA | GD | Pts | Qualification |
|---|---|---|---|---|---|---|---|---|---|---|
| 1 | Argentina | 3 | 3 | 0 | 0 | 18 | 1 | +17 | 9 | Quarter-finals |
| 2 | Canada | 3 | 2 | 0 | 1 | 15 | 3 | +12 | 6 | Quarter-finals |
| 3 | Uruguay | 3 | 1 | 0 | 2 | 8 | 8 | 0 | 3 | Quarter-finals |
| 4 | Cuba | 3 | 0 | 0 | 3 | 2 | 31 | −29 | 0 | Quarter-finals |

Source: FIH

29 July 2019
10:00

| Argentina | 2–0 | Uruguay |
|---|---|---|
| Rebecchi 7'; D'Elía 47' | Report |

Umpires:
Amber Church (NZL)
Megan Robertson (CAN)

29 July 2019
12:00

| Canada | 10–0 | Cuba |
|---|---|---|
| Stairs 2', 19', 51'; McManus 11', 23'; Norlander 13', 54'; Secco 21'; Haughn 46'; Stewart 56' | Report |

Umpires:
Liu Xiaoying (CHN)
Victoria Pazos (PAR)

31 July 2019
14:00

| Uruguay | 8–1 | Cuba |
|---|---|---|
| Viana 2', 14'; Piazza 17', 19'; Cristiani 23'; Taborda 30'; Villar 39'; Stanley 46' | Report | Milanes 53' |

Umpires:
Mary Driscoll (USA)
Catalina Montesino (CHI)

31 July 2019
16:00

| Canada | 0–3 | Argentina |
|---|---|---|
| | Report | D'Elía 5'; Rebecchi 34'; Barrionuevo 56' |

Umpires:
Lix Xiaoying (CHN)
Ayanna McClean (TTO)

2 August 2019
10:00

| Uruguay | 0–5 | Canada |
|---|---|---|
| | Report | Norlander 4'; Donohoe 10'; McManus 38', 43'; Stewart 51' |

Umpires:
Mary Driscoll (USA)
Maria Locatelli (ARG)

2 August 2019
14:00

| Argentina | 13–1 | Cuba |
|---|---|---|
| M. Granatto 2'; V. Granatto 9'; Barrionuevo 9', 21', 56', 59'; Jankunas 13', 27', 39'; Rebecchi 24', 43', 49'; Luchetti 28' | Report | Milanes 22' |

Umpires:
Amber Church (NZL)
Diana Fuentes Castelo (MEX)

==== Pool B ====
| Pos | Team | Pld | W | D | L | GF | GA | GD | Pts | Qualification |
|---|---|---|---|---|---|---|---|---|---|---|
| 1 | United States | 3 | 3 | 0 | 0 | 17 | 2 | +15 | 9 | Quarter-finals |
| 2 | Chile | 3 | 2 | 0 | 1 | 17 | 4 | +13 | 6 | Quarter-finals |
| 3 | Mexico | 3 | 1 | 0 | 2 | 4 | 7 | −3 | 3 | Quarter-finals |
| 4 | Peru (H) | 3 | 0 | 0 | 3 | 0 | 25 | −25 | 0 | Quarter-finals |

Source: FIH
(H) Hosts

29 July 2019
14:00

| United States | 5–0 | Mexico |
|---|---|---|
| Grega 27'; Magadan 34'; Moyer 38'; Matson 38'; Hoffman 40' | Report |

Umpires:
Maria Locatelli (ARG)
Catalina Montesino (CHI)

29 July 2019
16:00

| Chile | 13–0 | Peru |
|---|---|---|
| Maldonado 4', 54', 59'; Walbaum 5'; Villagran 10', 19', 35'; Urroz 28', 47', 59'; García 41'; De las Heras 43'; Jacob 53' | Report |

Umpires:
Ayanna McClean (TTO)
Mary Driscoll (USA)

31 July 2019
10:00

| Mexico | 4–0 | Peru |
|---|---|---|
| Estrada 28', 39'; Oveido 52'; González 59' | Report |

Umpires:
Megan Robertson (CAN)
Natalia Lodeiro (URU)

31 July 2019
12:00

| Chile | 2–4 | United States |
|---|---|---|
| De las Heras 12'; Urroz 36' | Report | Matson 50'; Moyer 51'; Froede 53'; Sharkey 56' |

Umpires:
Amber Church (NZL)
Victoria Pazos (PAR)

2 August 2019
12:00

| United States | 8–0 | Peru |
|---|---|---|
| Moyer 7'; Grega 29'; Matson 30'; Allessie 32', 34', 40', 49'; Sharkey 60' | Report |

Umpires:
Natalia Lodeiro (URU)
Catalina Montesino (CHI)

2 August 2019
16:00

| Mexico | 0–2 | Chile |
|---|---|---|
| | Report | García 31'; Urroz 33' |

Umpires:
Liu Xiaoying (CHN)
Victoria Pazos (PAR)

=== Classification round ===
==== Bracket ====
Quarter-finals
4 August
Argentina | 21
Peru | 0
4 August
Uruguay | 0
Chile | 5
4 August
Canada | 9
Mexico | 0
4 August
Cuba | 0
United States | 9

Semi-finals
6 August
Argentina | 3
Chile | 1
6 August
Canada | 2
United States | 0

Gold medal match
9 August
Argentina | 5
Canada | 1
Bronze medal match
9 August
Chile | 1
United States | 5

==== Quarter-finals ====
4 August 2019
09:30

| Argentina | 21–0 | Peru |
|---|---|---|
| M. Granatto 3', 18', 26'; Jankunas 10', 32', 45', 55'; Costa 14'; Luchetti 18', 60'; Albertarrio 23', 30', 43'; Alonso 25', 35'; V. Granatto 29', 49', 56'; Retegui 33'; D'Elía 45'; Trinchinetti 47' | Report |

Umpires:
Mary Driscoll (USA)
Maria Fuentes Castelo (Mex)

4 August 2019
11:45

| Canada | 9–0 | Mexico |
|---|---|---|
| Johansen 6', 41'; Donohoe 11'; Sourisseau 25', 33'; Woodcroft 28'; McManus 31'; Stairs 44'; Haughn 52' | Report |

Umpires:
Catilina Montesino (CHI)
Natalia Lodeiro (URU)

4 August 2019
15:00

| Uruguay | 0–5 | Chile |
|---|---|---|
| | Report | Maldonado 15', 17', 34'; Villagran 37'; Urroz 49' |

Umpires:
Liu Xiaoying (CHN)
Ayanna McClean (TTO)

4 August 2019
17:15

| Cuba | 0–9 | United States |
|---|---|---|
| | Report | Moyer 8'; Hoffman 14'; Allessie 22', 43'; Umstead 36'; Grega 37', 53'; Manley 38'; Sharkey 44' |

Umpires:
Megan Robertson (CAN)
Maria Locatelli (ARG)

==== Fifth to eighth place classification ====
Cross-overs
6 August
Peru | 0
Uruguay | 14
6 August
Mexico | 1
Cuba | 0

Fifth place
9 August
Uruguay | 4
Mexico | 0
Seventh place
9 August
Peru | 3
Cuba | 2

===== Cross-overs =====
6 August 2019
09:30

| Peru | 0–14 | Uruguay |
|---|---|---|
| | Report | Viana 3', 30', 32', 42', 45'; Oliveros 11', 56'; Stanley 17'; Taborda 23', 31', 50'; Vilar del Valle 26', 32'; Olave 35' |

Umpires:
Mary Driscoll (USA)
Megan Robertson (CAN)

6 August 2019
11:45

| Mexico | 1–0 | Cuba |
|---|---|---|
| Marí. Correa 12' | Report |

Umpires:
Maria Locatelli (ARG)
Catalina Montesino (CHI)

===== Seventh and eighth place =====
9 August 2019
9:30

| Peru | 3–2 | Cuba |
|---|---|---|
| Montes 10', 36'; Alvarez 14' | Report | Vera 14'; Fernandez 44' |

Umpires:
Natalia Lodeiro (URU)
Victoria Pazos (PAR)

===== Fifth and sixth place =====
9 August 2019
11:45

| Uruguay | 4–0 | Mexico |
|---|---|---|
| Vilar del Valle 32', 39' de María 57'; Nieto 60' | Report |

Umpires:
Liu Xiaoying (CHN)
Megan Robertson (CAN)

==== Semi-finals ====
6 August 2019
15:00

| Argentina | 3–1 | Chile |
|---|---|---|
| Rebecchi 3'; Jankunas 44', 60' | Report | Krimerman 45' |

Umpires:
Ayanna McClean (TTO)
Liu Xiaoying (CHN)

6 August 2019
17:15

| Canada | 2–0 | United States |
|---|---|---|
| Johansen 10'; Secco 35' | Report |

Umpires:
Amber Church (NZL)
Victoria Pazos (PAR)

==== Bronze medal match ====
9 August 2019
15:00

| Chile | 1–5 | United States |
|---|---|---|
| De las Heras 3' | Report | Moyer 2'; Matson 19', 24', 52'; Sharkey 21' |

Umpires:
Amber Church (NZL)
Maria Locatelli (ARG)

==== Gold medal match ====
9 August 2019
17:15

| (gold) Argentina | 5–1 | Canada (silver) |
|---|---|---|
| Jankunas 9', 47'; D'Elía 22', 45'; Rebecchi 37' | Report | Wright 32' |

Umpires:
Catalina Montesino (CHI)
Mary Driscoll (USA)

Team details

Argentina
Canada

| GK | 1 | Belén Succi |
| DF | 32 | Valentina Costa |
| DF | 25 | Silvina D'Elía |
| DF | 27 | Noel Barrionuevo |
| DF | 22 | Eugenia Trinchinetti |
| MF | 5 | Agostina Alonso |
| MF | 18 | Victoria Sauze |
| MF | 4 | Rosario Luchetti (c) |
| FW | 15 | María José Granatto | 13' |
| FW | 11 | Carla Rebecchi |
| FW | 28 | Julieta Jankunas |
Substitutions:
| FW | 19 | Agustina Albertarrio | | (substituted on) 6' |
| FW | 21 | Victoria Granatto | | (substituted on) 9' |
| MF | 23 | Micaela Retegui | | (substituted on) 16' |
| DF | 2 | Sofía Toccalino | | (substituted on) 24' |
| DF | 7 | Giselle Kañevsky | | (substituted on) 11' |
Manager:
(Argentina) Carlos Retegui

| GK | 1 | Kaitlyn Williams |
| DF | 9 | Danielle Hennig |
| DF | 14 | Karli Johansen |
| DF | 17 | Sara McManus |
| MF | 11 | Rachel Donohoe |
| MF | 13 | Hannah Haughn |
| MF | 16 | Natalie Sourisseau |
| MF | 21 | Amanda Woodcroft |
| FW | 3 | Katherine Wright (c) | 50' |
| FW | 23 | Brienne Stairs |
| FW | 26 | Stephanie Norlander |
Substitutions:
| MF | 6 | Anna Mollenhauer | | (substituted on) 6' |
| DF | 8 | Elise Wong | | (substituted on) 9' |
| FW | 19 | Holly Stewart | | (substituted on) 6' |
| FW | 22 | Madeline Secco | | (substituted on) 6' |
| DF | 25 | Shanlee Johnston | | (substituted on) 6' |
Manager:
(South Africa) Giles Bonnet

== Statistics ==
=== Final standings ===
| Rank | Team |
|---|---|
| Gold medal | Argentina |
| Silver medal | Canada |
| Bronze medal | United States |
| 4 | Chile |
| 5 | Uruguay |
| 6 | Mexico |
| 7 | Peru |
| 8 | Cuba |

Qualified for the 2020 Summer Olympics

=== Goalscorers ===
There were 166 goals scored in 24 matches, for an average of 6.92 goals per match.

11 goals

- (Argentina) Julieta Jankunas

7 goals

- (Argentina) Carla Rebecchi
- (Uruguay) Teresa Viana

6 goals

- (Chile) María Maldonado
- (Chile) Manuela Urroz
- (United States) Mackenzie Allessie
- (United States) Erin Matson

5 goals

- (Argentina) Noel Barrionuevo
- (Argentina) Silvina D'Elía
- (Canada) Sara McManus
- (United States) Lauren Moyer

4 goals

- (Argentina) María Granatto
- (Argentina) Victoria Granatto
- (Canada) Brienne Stairs
- (Chile) Fernanda Villagran
- (United States) Danielle Grega
- (United States) Kathleen Sharkey
- (Uruguay) Agustina Taborda
- (Uruguay) Manuela Vilar del Valle

3 goals

- (Argentina) Agustina Albertario
- (Argentina) Rosario Luchetti
- (Canada) Karli Johansen
- (Canada) Stephanie Norlander
- (Chile) Consuelo de las Heras

2 goals

- (Argentina) Agostina Alonso
- (Canada) Rachel Donohoe
- (Canada) Hannah Haughn
- (Canada) Madeline Secco
- (Canada) Natalie Sourisseau
- (Canada) Holly Stewart
- (Chile) Carolina García
- (Cuba) Yunia Milanes
- (Mexico) Arlette Estrada
- (Peru) Maria Montes
- (United States) Ashley Hoffman
- (United States) Alyssa Manley
- (Uruguay) Pilar Oliveros
- (Uruguay) Camila Piazza
- (Uruguay) Janine Stanley

1 goal

- (Argentina) Valentina Costa Biondi
- (Argentina) Micaela Retegui
- (Argentina) Eugenia Trinchinetti
- (Canada) Amanda Woodcroft
- (Chile) Kim Jacob
- (Chile) Denise Krimerman
- (Chile) Sofía Walbaum
- (Cuba) Leticia Fernandez
- (Cuba) Yuraima Vera
- (Mexico) Maria Correa
- (Mexico) Karen Gonzalez
- (Mexico) Fernanda Oveido
- (Peru) Marianella Alvarez
- (United States) Ali Froede
- (United States) Amanda Magadan
- (United States) Casey Umstead
- (Uruguay) Clementina Cristiani
- (Uruguay) Camila de María
- (Uruguay) Agustina Nieto
- (Uruguay) Anastásia Olave
- (Uruguay) Soledad Villar
