= Micaela Retegui =

Argentine field hockey player

Personal information
- Born: 23 April 1996 (age 30) Argentina
- Height: 163 cm (5 ft 4 in)
- Weight: 58 kg (128 lb)

Sport
- Sport: Field hockey
- Position: Midfielder
- Club: San Fernando
National team
Years	Team	Caps	Goals
2019–	Argentina	23	(5)
Medal record
Olympic Games
Silver medal – second place	2020 Tokyo	Team
Pan American Games
Gold medal – first place	2019 Lima
Pan American Cup
Gold medal – first place	2022 Santiago
Youth Olympics
Bronze medal – third place	2014 Nanjing

Micaela Retegui (born 23 April 1996) is an Argentine field hockey player. She is the daughter of Argentina's hockey coach Carlos Retegui. She plays with the Argentina national field hockey team, winning silver medal at the 2020 Summer Olympics.

== Hockey career ==
In 2019, Retegui was called into the senior national women's team. She competed in the team that finished fourth at the 2019 Pro League in Amstelveen.

She won a bronze medal at the 2014 Youth Olympics in Nanjing. She won a gold medal at the 2019 Pan American Games.
