= Eugenia Trinchinetti =

Argentine field hockey player

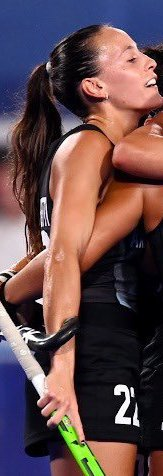
- Trinchinetti at the 2020 Summer Olympics

Personal information
- Full name: María Eugenia Trinchinetti
- Born: 17 July 1997 (age 29) Victoria, Entre Ríos, Argentina
- Height: 1.67 m (5 ft 6 in)
- Weight: 55 kg (121 lb)

Sport
- Sport: Field hockey
- Position: Midfielder/Forward
- Club: Club San Fernando
Senior career
Years	Team	Caps	Goals
–	Club San Fernando	-	-
National team
Years	Team	Caps	Goals
2015–	Argentina	115	(13)
Medal record
Olympic Games
Silver medal – second place	2020 Tokyo	Team
Bronze medal – third place	2024 Paris	Team
World Cup
Gold medal – first place	2026 Wavre/Amstelveen
Silver medal – second place	2022 Terrassa/Amstelveen
Champions Trophy
Bronze medal – third place	2018 Changzhou
Pan American Cup
Gold medal – first place	2017 Lancaster
Gold medal – first place	2022 Santiago
Gold medal – first place	2025 Montevideo
Pan American Games
Gold medal – first place	2019 Lima	Team
Gold medal – first place	2023 Santiago	Team
Junior World Cup
Gold medal – first place	2016 Santiago
Youth Olympic Games
Bronze medal – third place	2014 Nanjing	Team

María Eugenia Trinchinetti (born 17 July 1997) is an Argentine field hockey player and part of the Argentina national team. She plays with the Argentina national field hockey team, winning silver medal at the 2020 Summer Olympics.

== Career ==
She won a gold medal at the 2019 Pan American Games and also at the 2023 Games.

She was part of the national squad that won the 2022 Pan American Cup. In 2022 she also won the 2021-22 Hockey Pro League and the silver medal at the 2022 World Cup.

In 2020, she won the silver medal with Argentina at the 2020 Tokyo Summer Olympics, and she also won the bronze medal with Las Leonas at the 2024 Paris Summer Olympics.
