= Victoria Sauze =

Argentine field hockey player (born 1991)

Personal information
- Full name: Victoria Sauze Valdéz
- Born: 21 July 1991 (age 35) Argentina
- Height: 161 cm (5 ft 3 in)
- Weight: 52 kg (115 lb)

Sport
- Sport: Field hockey
- Position: Midfielder
- Club: River Plate
National team
Years	Team	Caps	Goals
2017–	Argentina	66	-
Medal record
Olympic Games
Silver medal – second place	2020 Tokyo	Team
Bronze medal – third place	2024 Paris	Team
World Cup
Gold medal – first place	2026 Wavre/Amstelveen
Silver medal – second place	2022 Terrassa/Amstelveen
Champions Trophy
Bronze medal – third place	2018 Changzhou
Pan American Games
Gold medal – first place	2019 Lima	Team
Gold medal – first place	2023 Santiago	Team
Pan American Cup
Gold medal – first place	2022 Santiago
Gold medal – first place	2025 Montevideo
South American Games
Gold medal – first place	2018 Cochabamba

Victoria Sauze Valdéz (born 21 July 1991) is an Argentine field hockey player. She plays with the Argentina national field hockey team, winning silver medal at the 2020 Summer Olympics.

== Hockey career ==
Sauze started her career in Tucumán Rugby Club, then moving to Buenos Aires to play for River Plate.

In 2017, Sauze was called into the senior national women's team. She competed in the team that finished fifth at the 2016-17 Hockey World League Final in Auckland.

She won a gold medal at the 2019 Pan American Games.

In 2020, she won the silver medal with Argentina at the 2020 Tokyo Summer Olympics, and she also won the bronze medal with Las Leonas at the 2024 Paris Summer Olympics.
