= Amanda Magadan =

American women's field hockey player (born 1995)

Amanda Golini
Personal information
- Born: Amanda Magadan; March 28, 1995 (age 31) Randolph, New Jersey, U.S.

Sport
- Sport: Field hockey
- Position: Midfielder
National team
Years	Team	Caps	Goals
2017–	United States	132	-
Medal record
Women's field hockey
Representing United States
Pan American Cup
Bronze medal – third place	2017 Lancaster	Team
Pan American Games
Bronze medal – third place	2019 Lima	Team
FIH Olympic Qualifiers
Silver medal – second place	2024 Ranchi	Team

Amanda Golini (née Magadan, born March 28, 1995) is an American women's field hockey player. Madagan joined the United States national team in 2017, following success in the national junior team.

== Early life and career ==
Magadan was raised in Randolph, New Jersey, and graduated from Randolph High School before attending Lafayette College.

== Career ==
Magadan first represented the United States Women's Junior National Team at the 2016 Junior Pan American Cup in Tacarigua, Trinidad and Tobago. From this tournament, the team qualified for the 2016 Junior World Cup, where she also represented the United States.

Magadan was a member of the United States national team at the 2017 Pan American Cup. She scored a goal in her team's semi-final defeat by the Chilean team. She was also a member of the United States team at the 2019 Pan America Games in Lima, Peru, and played in the 2019 FIH Olympic Qualifier Event in Bhubaneswar against India.

As of January 2021, Magadan had accumulated 80 international caps. She was captain for Team USA in the 2022 Pan American Cup and scored a goal against Canada in the opening round.
