= Mackenzie Allessie =

American field hockey player (born 2001)

Personal information
- Full name: Mackenzie Grace Allessie
- Born: March 6, 2001 (age 25) Mount Joy, Pennsylvania, U.S.

Sport
- Sport: Field hockey
- Position: Midfielder
- Club: Alleycats
National team
Years	Team	Caps	Goals
2019–	United States	23	(9)
Medal record
Women's field hockey
Representing United States
Pan American Games
Bronze medal – third place	2019 Lima	Team

Mackenzie Grace Allessie (born March 6, 2001) is an American field hockey player.

== Personal life ==
Allessie was born in Mount Joy, Pennsylvania. She began playing hockey in 2008 at just seven years old.

Allessie is a former student of Donegal High School. During her school hockey career, Allessie scored a record 331 goals in the National Federation of High Schools.

== Career ==
=== Junior National Team ===
Allessie has been a member of the United States junior teams since 2016, when she was just 15 years of age.

=== Senior National Team ===
Allessie was first raised into the senior national team in 2019, following standout performances in the junior national team.

In January 2019, Allessie made her senior international debut during a test series against Chile.

Since her debut, Allessie has been a regular inclusion in the United States team, most recently appearing in the 2019 FIH Pro League.

=== International Goals ===
Goal	Date	Location	Opponent	Score	Result	Competition	Ref.
1	January 29, 2019	Club Deportivo Manquehue, Santiago, Chile	Chile	2–0	3–3	Test Match	
2	February 2, 2019	Estadio Municipal de Hockey, Córdoba, Argentina	Argentina	1–0	2–2 (1–3)	2019 FIH Pro League	
3	March 31, 2019	Spooky Nook Sports, Lancaster, United States	Great Britain	1–0	1–3	2019 FIH Pro League	
4	2 August 2019	Andres Avelino Caceres Sports Complex, Lima, Peru	Peru	4–0	8–0	2019 Pan American Games	
5	2 August 2019	Andres Avelino Caceres Sports Complex, Lima, Peru	Peru	5–0	8–0	2019 Pan American Games	
6	2 August 2019	Andres Avelino Caceres Sports Complex, Lima, Peru	Peru	6–0	8–0	2019 Pan American Games	
7	2 August 2019	Andres Avelino Caceres Sports Complex, Lima, Peru	Peru	7–0	8–0	2019 Pan American Games	
8	4 August 2019	Andres Avelino Caceres Sports Complex, Lima, Peru	Cuba	3–0	9–0	2019 Pan American Games	
9	4 August 2019	Andres Avelino Caceres Sports Complex, Lima, Peru	Cuba	7–0	9–0	2019 Pan American Games	
