= Agostina Alonso =

Argentine field hockey player (born 1995)

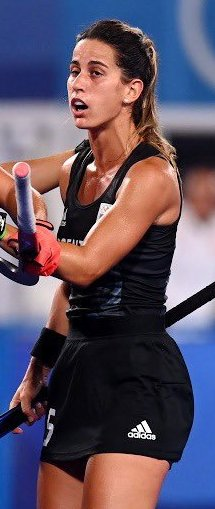
- Alonso at the 2020 Summer Olympics

Personal information
- Born: 1 October 1995 (age 30) Buenos Aires, Argentina
- Height: 1.60 m (5 ft 3 in)
- Weight: 53 kg (117 lb)

Sport
- Sport: Field hockey
- Position: Midfielder
- Club: Banco Nación
Senior career
Years	Team	Caps	Goals
–	Banco Nación	-	-
National team
Years	Team	Caps	Goals
2017–	Argentina	101	-
Medal record
Olympic Games
Silver medal – second place	2020 Tokyo	Team
Bronze medal – third place	2024 Paris	Team
World Cup
Gold medal – first place	2026 Wavre/Amstelveen
Silver medal – second place	2022 Terrassa/Amstelveen
Champions Trophy
Bronze medal – third place	2018 Changzhou
Pan American Cup
Gold medal – first place	2017 Lancaster
Gold medal – first place	2022 Santiago
Gold medal – first place	2025 Montevideo
Pan American Games
Gold medal – first place	2019 Lima	Team
Gold medal – first place	2023 Santiago	Team
Junior World Cup
Gold medal – first place	2016 Santiago

Agostina Alonso (born 1 October 1995) is an Argentine field hockey player and part of the Argentina national team, winning silver medal at the 2020 Summer Olympics.

== Career ==
She was the part of the Argentine team that won the 2016 Women's Hockey Junior World Cup after a beating the Netherlands in the finals. She also won a gold medal at the 2019 Pan American Games.

In 2024, she won the bronze medal with Las Leonas at the 2024 Paris Summer Olympics.
