= 2017 Women's Pan American Cup =

Tournament details
- Host country: United States
- City: Lancaster
- Dates: 5–13 August
- Teams: 7 (from 1 confederation)
- Venue: Spooky Nook Sports

Final positions
- Champions: Argentina (5th title)
- Runner-up: Chile
- Third place: United States

Tournament statistics
- Matches played: 15
- Goals scored: 71 (4.73 per match)
- Top scorer(s): (Argentina) Noel Barrionuevo (United States) Kathleen Sharkey (5 goals)
- Best player: (Chile) Denise Krimerman
- Best young player: (Argentina) Paula Ortiz
- Best goalkeeper: (Chile) Claudia Schüler

The 2017 Women's Pan American Cup was the fifth edition of the Women's Pan American Cup, the quadrennial international women's field hockey championship of the Americas organised by the Pan American Hockey Federation. It was held between 5 and 13 August 2017 in Lancaster, Pennsylvania, United States, simultaneously with the men's tournament.

The tournament doubled as the qualifier for two major international tournaments: the winner qualified directly to the 2018 World Cup, and the two teams not qualifying through the 2018 South American Games or the 2018 Central American and Caribbean Games qualified for the 2019 Pan American Games to be held in Lima, Peru. Also, the top 6 teams qualified for the next Pan American Cup, while the bottom two need to compete in the Pan American Challenge.

Argentina won the tournament for the fifth consecutive time after defeating Chile 4–1 in the final. As they had already secured an automatic berth at the 2018 Hockey World Cup thanks to a fourth-place finish at the World League Semifinal in Johannesburg, South Africa, their quota was immediately awarded to first reserve team, Italy.

== Qualification ==
The top six nations at the 2013 Pan American Cup qualified directly with the remaining two spots were assigned to the first and second-placed team at the 2015 Pan American Challenge, which was held in Chiclayo, Peru.

Dates	Event	Location	Quotas	Qualifier(s)
21–28 September 2013	2013 Women's Pan American Cup	Mendoza, Argentina	6	Argentina; Canada; Chile; Mexico; United States; Uruguay
3–11 October 2015	2015 Pan American Challenge	Chiclayo, Peru	2	Brazil; ~~Barbados~~
Total			7	

Barbados withdrew before the tournament.

== Results ==
All times are Eastern Daylight Time (UTC−04:00)

=== First round ===
==== Pool A ====
Pos	Team	Pld	W	D	L	GF	GA	GD	Pts	Qualification
1	Argentina	2	2	0	0	8	1	+7	6	Semi-finals
2	Chile	2	1	0	1	3	2	+1	3	Semi-finals
3	Uruguay	2	0	0	2	0	8	−8	0	

Source: Panamhockey
Rules for classification: 1) points; 2) goal difference; 3) goals scored; 4) head-to-head result.

5 August 2017
17:00

Argentina	2–1	Chile
Granatto 8'; Campoy 44'	Report	Walbaum 60'

Umpires:
Fanneke Alkemade (NED)
Maggie Befort (USA)

7 August 2017
17:00

Uruguay	0–6	Argentina
	Report	Jankunas 8'; Merino 17'; Barrionuevo 23', 60'; Alonso 53'; Cavallero 54'

Umpires:
Lelia Sacre (CAN)
Junko Wagatsuma (JPN)

9 August 2017
12:00

Chile	2–0	Uruguay
Caram 37'; Urroz 55'	Report

Umpires:
Mariana Reydo (ARG)
Maggie Befort (USA)

==== Pool B ====
Pos	Team	Pld	W	D	L	GF	GA	GD	Pts	Qualification
1	United States (H)	3	2	1	0	16	1	+15	7	Semi-finals
2	Canada	3	2	1	0	14	1	+13	7	Semi-finals
3	Mexico	3	1	0	2	1	10	−9	3	
4	Brazil	3	0	0	3	0	19	−19	0	

Source: Panamhockey
Rules for classification: 1) points; 2) goal difference; 3) goals scored; 4) head-to-head result.
(H) Hosts

5 August 2017
12:00

Canada	9–0	Brazil
Johansen 4', 27'; Norlander 14', 22'; Woodcroft 30', 51'; Johnston 46'; Wright 47'; Haughn 54'	Report

Umpires:
Junko Wagatsuma (JPN)
Diana Fuentes (MEX)

5 August 2017
19:00

United States	6–0	Mexico
Sharkey 4', 17', 35'; Froede 9', 60'; Witmer 32'	Report

Umpires:
Camila Cabargas (CHI)
Natalia Lodeiro (URU)

7 August 2017
12:00

Mexico	1–0	Brazil
Correa 40'	Report

Umpires:
Camila Cabargas (CHI)
Maggie Giddens (USA)

7 August 2017
19:00

Canada	1–1	United States
Donohoe 34'	Report	Magadan 1'

Umpires:
Mariana Reydo (ARG)
Diana Fuentes Castelo (MEX)

9 August 2017
17:00

Mexico	0–4	Canada
	Report	Stairs 37', 49', 56'; Norlander 40'

Umpires:
Natalia Lodeiro (URU)
Maggie Giddens (USA)

9 August 2017
19:00

United States	9–0	Brazil
Sharkey 6', 33'; Witmer 12', 43'; West 14', 45', 55'; Shealy 25', 58'	Report

Umpires:
Fanneke Alkemade (NED)
Camila Cabargas (CHI)

=== Fifth to seventh place classification ===
Cross-over
11 August
Uruguay	8
Brazil	0

Fifth place
13 August
Mexico	0
Uruguay	1

==== Cross-over ====
11 August 2017
13:45

Uruguay	8–0	Brazil
Dall'Orso 5'; Algorta 15', 17'; Christiani 20'; Vilar 22'; Viana 30', 47'	Report

Umpires:
Junko Wagatsuma (JPN)
Maggie Befort (USA)

==== Fifth and sixth place ====
13 August 2017
13:45

Mexico	0–1	Uruguay
	Report	Nieto 46'

Umpires:
Lelia Sacre (CAN)
Camila Cabargas (CHI)

=== First to fourth place classification ===
Semi-finals
11 August
Argentina	4
Canada	1
11 August
United States	3
Chile	4

Final
13 August
Argentina	4
Chile	1
Third place
13 August
Canada	1
United States	2

==== Semi-finals ====
11 August 2017
16:00

Argentina	4–1	Canada
Ortiz 6'; Barrionuevo 19', 58'; Gomes Fantasia 29'	Report	Johansen 38'

Umpires:
Maggie Giddens (USA)
Diana Fuentes Castelo (MEX)

11 August 2017
18:15

United States	3–4	Chile
Hoffman 1'; Matson 30'; Magadan 59'	Report	Salas 14'; Urroz 20'; Krimerman 34', 60'

Umpires:
Lelia Sacre (CAN)
Mariana Reydo (ARG)

==== Third and fourth place ====
13 August 2017
16:00

Canada	1–2	United States
Johansen 20'	Report	Vittese 40'; West 52'

Umpires:
Natalia Lodiero (URU)
Fanneke Alkemade (NED)

==== Final ====
13 August 2017
18:15

Argentina	4–1	Chile
Gomes Fantasia 41'; Jankunas 41'; Granatto 45'; Barrionuevo 46'	Report	Walbaum 43'

Umpires:
Junko Wagatsuma (JPN)
Maggie Giddens (USA)

Team details

Argentina
Chile

GK	1	Belén Succi
DF	27	Noel Barrionuevo
DF	29	Julia Gomes Fantasia
MF	14	Agustina Habif	35'
MF	16	Florencia Habif	(yellow card) 52'
MF	10	Magdalena Fernández
MF	20	Lucina von der Heyde
FW	7	Martina Cavallero
FW	12	Delfina Merino (c)	27'
FW	15	María José Granatto
FW	17	Rocío Sánchez Moccia
Substitutions:
DF	3	Agustina Gorzelany		(substituted on) 14'
MF	5	Agostina Alonso		(substituted on) 7'
MF	4	Eugenia Trinchinetti		(substituted on) x'
MF	23	Pilar Campoy		(substituted on) 6'
MF	26	María Paula Ortiz		(substituted on) 7'
Coach:
(Argentina) Agustín Corradini

GK	1	Claudia Schüler
DF	2	Sofia Walbaum
DF	5	Denise Rojas
DF	6	Fernanda Flores
DF	13	Camila Caram (c)
MF	16	Constanza Palma
MF	31	Fernanda Villagrán
FW	8	Carolina García
FW	10	Manuela Urroz	(yellow card) 51'
FW	21	Josefa Villalabeitia
FW	26	Kim Jacob
Substitutions:
MF	14	Francisca Tala		(substituted on) 5'
MF	7	Sofía Filipek		(substituted on) 7'
FW	19	Agustina Solano		(substituted on) 11'
MF	24	Josefa Salas		(substituted on) 5'
	27	Paula Valdivia		(substituted on) 5'
FW	x	María J. Maldonado		(substituted on) 5'
Coach:
(Chile) Diego Amoroso

== Statistics ==
=== Final ranking ===
Rank	Team
1st place, gold medalist(s)	Argentina
2nd place, silver medalist(s)	Chile
3rd place, bronze medalist(s)	United States
4	Canada
5	Uruguay
6	Mexico
7	Brazil

=== Awards ===
Top Goalscorer	Player of the Tournament	Goalkeeper of the Tournament	Young Player of the Tournament
(Argentina) Noel Barrionuevo (United States) Kathleen Sharkey	(Chile) Denise Krimerman	(Chile) Claudia Schüler	(Argentina) Paula Ortiz

=== Goalscorers ===
5 goals

- (Argentina) Noel Barrionuevo
- (United States) Kathleen Sharkey

4 goals

- (Canada) Karli Johansen
- (United States) Taylor West

3 goals

- (Canada) Stephanie Norlander
- (Canada) Brienne Stairs
- (United States) Jill Witmer

2 goals

- (Argentina) Julia Gomes Fantasia
- (Argentina) María José Granatto
- (Argentina) Julieta Jankunas
- (Canada) Nikki Woodcroft
- (Chile) Denise Krimerman
- (Chile) Manuela Urroz
- (Chile) Sofia Walbaum
- (United States) Ali Froede
- (United States) Amanda Magadan
- (United States) Loren Shealy
- (Uruguay) Milagros Algorta
- (Uruguay) Teresa Viana
- (Uruguay) Kaisuami Dall'Orso

1 goal

- (Argentina) Agostina Alonso
- (Argentina) Maria Campoy
- (Argentina) Martina Cavallero
- (Argentina) Delfina Merino
- (Argentina) Maria Ortíz
- (Canada) Rachel Donohoe
- (Canada) Shanlee Johnston
- (Canada) Sara McManus
- (Canada) Kate Wright
- (Chile) Camila Caram
- (Chile) Josefa Salas
- (Mexico) Marlet Correa
- (United States) Ashley Hoffman
- (United States) Erin Matson
- (United States) Michelle Vittese
- (Uruguay) Clementina Cristiane
- (Uruguay) Agustina Nieto
- (Uruguay) Manuela Vilar

== See also ==
- 2017 Men's Pan American Cup
