= Casey Umstead =

American field hockey player

Personal information
- Born: February 16, 1996 (age 30) Green Lane, Pennsylvania, U.S.
- Height: 5 ft 5 in (165 cm)

Sport
- Sport: Field hockey
- Position: Defender
- Club: X–Calibur
National team
Years	Team	Caps	Goals
2018–	United States	27	(1)
Medal record
Women's field hockey
Representing United States
Pan American Games
Bronze medal – third place	2019 Lima	Team

Casey Umstead (born February 16, 1996) is a field hockey player from the United States, who plays as a defender.

== Personal life ==
Casey Umstead was born and raised in Green Lane, Pennsylvania.

She studied at the University of Connecticut.

== Career ==
In 2018, Umstead made her debut for the United States during a test series against Belgium in Lancaster, Pennsylvania.

Umstead won her first medal with the national team in 2019, at the Pan American Games in Lima. During the tournament, Umstead scored her first international goal for the USA.

=== International goals ===
Goal	Date	Location	Opponent	Score	Result	Competition	Ref.
1	August 4, 2019	Andres Avelino Caceres Sports Complex, Lima, Peru	Cuba	4–0	9–0	2019 Pan American Games	
