= Carlos Retegui =

Argentine field hockey player

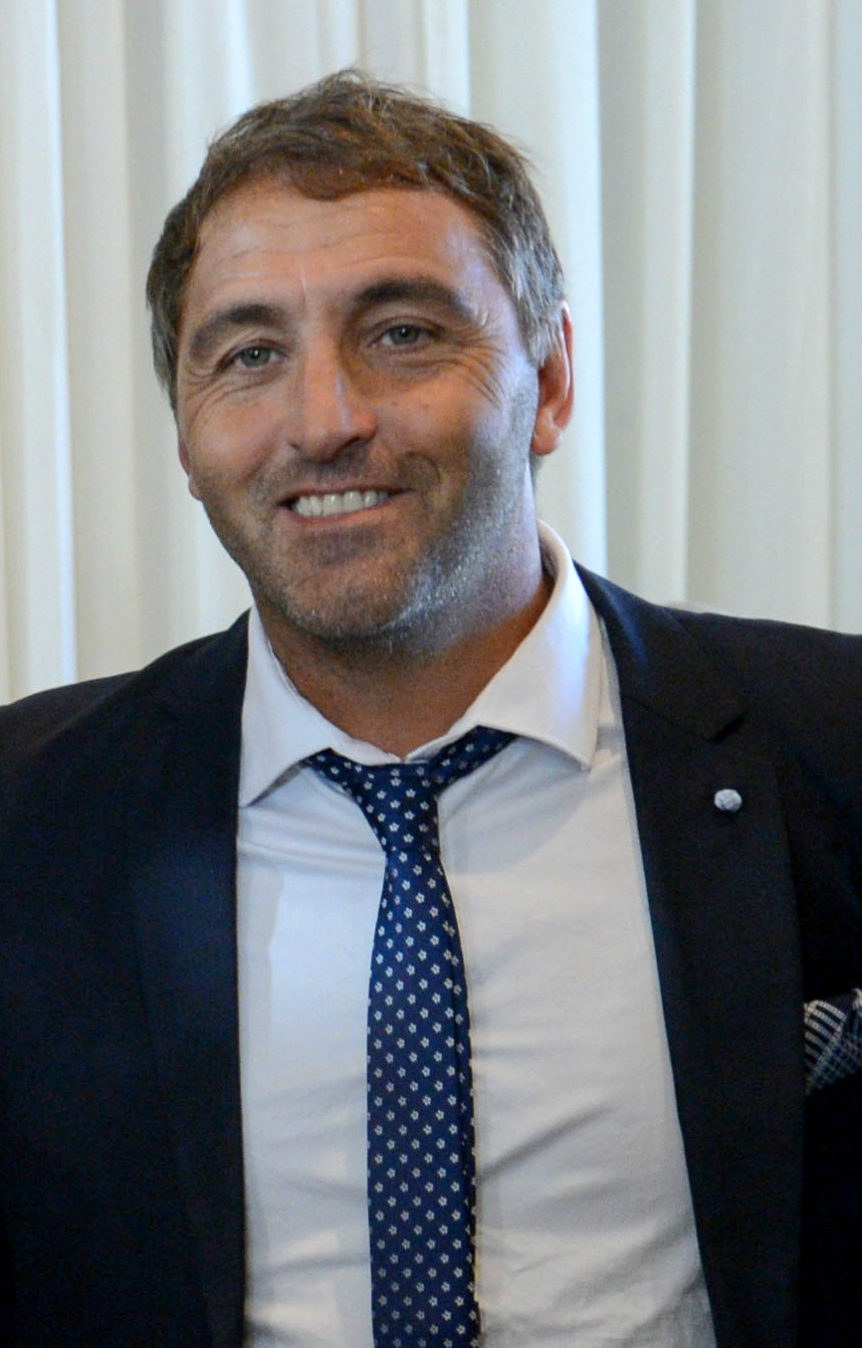

Personal information
- Born: 19 December 1969 (age 56) San Fernando, Argentina
- Height: 1.81 m (5 ft 11 in)
- Weight: 82 kg (181 lb)
Medal record
Pan American Games
Gold medal – first place	1991 Havana	Team
Gold medal – first place	1995 Mar del Plata	Team
Gold medal – first place	2003 Santo Domingo	Team
Silver medal – second place	1999 Winnipeg	Team

Carlos José Retegui (born 19 December 1969) is an Argentine retired field hockey player. He was a member of the National squad from 1989 to 2006 and competed in three Summer Olympics (1996, 2000 and 2004). In 2006 he was dismissed from the national team by his former teammate and head coach, Sergio Vigil.

Between 2008 and 2009 he coached the Argentina men's national field hockey team. In 2009 he succeeded Gabriel Minadeo as coach of the Argentina women's national field hockey team until 2012 when his contract was not renewed. In early 2013 he took up the men's team again, and after the resignation of Emanuel Roggero in late 2013 as the women's coach, he took care of both teams until the 2014 World Cups. In the men's tournament, the national squad won the bronze medal, the best result in their history and also won the bronze medal in the women's tournament. After losing the women's semifinal, he confirmed that the bronze medal match would be his last as coach, and that he would continue only with the men's team.

Retegui coached the women's team to gold medals at the 2010 World Cup, 2009, 2010 and 2012 Hockey Champions Trophy. Under his guidance, Las Leonas also won the silver medal at the 2011 Champions Trophy, 2011 Pan American Games and 2012 Summer Olympics and the bronze medal at the 2014 World Cup.

With the men's team he won the gold medal at the 2016 Summer Olympics making Los Leones the only team in the Americas to ever win this tournament, both in the men and women's tournament. He also coached the team to a silver medal at the 2016–17 Hockey World League, a bronze medal at the 2008 Men's Hockey Champions Trophy and 2014 World Cup, and gold medals at the 2015 Pan American Games, 2013 and 2017 Pan American Cup.

At the beginning of 2018 he resigned as coach of the national team, but ultimately came back as head coach for the 2018 Summer Youth Olympics. And in 2019, he became once again the coach of the women's national team.

In 2015, he was elected to the San Fernando Partido council as a Front for Victory member.

== Personal life ==
Retegui's son, Mateo, is a professional footballer and his daughter, Micaela, has been called to take part of Las Leonas at the beginning of 2019.
