= 2019 Argentina Women's Hockey National Tournament =

Tournament details
- Host country: Argentina
- City: Mendoza
- Dates: 3–6 October
- Teams: 8

Final positions
- Champions: (Mendoza Province) Mendoza
- Runner-up: (Córdoba Province, Argentina) Córdoba
- Third place: (Buenos Aires Province) Bahía Blanca

Tournament statistics
- Matches played: 20
- Goals scored: 32 (1.6 per match)
- Top scorer(s): (Córdoba Province, Argentina) Julieta Jankunas (4 goals)
- Best player: (Córdoba Province, Argentina) Julieta Jankunas
- Best goalkeeper: (Córdoba Province, Argentina) Paula Pasquetín

The 2019 Argentina Women's Hockey National Tournament was the 11th edition of the women's national tournament. It was going to be held from 3 to 6 October 2019 in Mendoza, Argentina.

Mendoza achieved its third title after beating Cordoba 3-0 at the final.

== Squads ==
Players followed with a country flag are those involved in its senior national team.

Buenos Aires

Amateur Field Hockey Association of Buenos Aires

Head coach: Agustín Lavagno

2. Delfina Fernández
3. Agustina Gorzelany (Argentina)
4. Martina Triñares
5. Mercedes Socino © (Italy)
6. Sofía Giménez
7. Rocío González Canda
8. Mercedes Correa
9. Carla Dupuy
10. Paula Ortiz (Argentina)
11. Victoria Granatto (Argentina)
12. Clara Barberi
13. Emilia Forcherio
14. Juanita Ayerza
15. Julieta Gluch
16. Lucía Sanguinetti
17. Carolina Gluch
18. Azul Raggianti
19. Antonella Rinaldi
20. Tatiana Herrero
(Buenos Aires Province) Bahía Blanca

Bahía Blanca's Hockey Association

Head coach: Sergio Nasso

1. Lucía López Izarra
2. Marina Urruti
3. Isabella Orioli
4. Bárbara Dichiara
5. Luciana Argüello
6. Gabriela Ludueña
7. Florencia Donati
8. Valentina Costa Biondi (Argentina)
9. Ivana Mazars
10. Martina Orioli
11. Eugenia Etulain
14. Itatí Ruilópez ©
15. Julieta Kluin
17. Camila Urruti
19. Agustina Lertora
(Córdoba Province, Argentina) Córdoba

Córdoba's Hockey Federation

Head coach: Miguel Ángel Rivera

1. Paula Pasquettin
3. Julieta Ceballos
4. Florencia Nogueira ©
5. Emilia Inaudi
6. Mickaela Garrone
7. Juliana Ríos
8. Sofía Ramallo (Argentina)
9. Julieta Jankunas (Argentina)
10. Victoria Aguirre
11. Josefina Rübenacker (Argentina)
13. Julieta Torres
14. Brunella Manrique
15. Victoria Lorenzatti
16. Sofía Funes
17. Camila Broglia
18. Celeste Soria
19. Paz Villegas
20. Julieta Alday
(Mendoza Province) Mendoza

Mendoza's Hockey Association

Head coach: José González

1. Florencia Saravia
2. Silvina D'Elía (Argentina)
3. Lucía Tapia
4. Josefina Nardi
5. Gabriela Koltes
6. Gimena Vera
7. Sofía Avedaño
8. Julieta Medici
9. Delfina Thome Gustavino
10. Bárbara Muzaber
11. Florencia Barbera
12. Mariana Scandura (Argentina)
13. Priscila Jardel (Argentina)
14. Emilia Bazzana
15. Macarena Rodríguez ©
16. Valentina Micoli
17. Chiara Medici
18. Gianella Palet
19. Luz Rosso
(Misiones Province) Misiones

Misiones' Hockey Association

Head coach: Matías Petit

1. Nayibe Zampaca
2. Eliana von der Heyde ©
3. Melisa Figueredo
4. Laura Gunther
5. Paula Antueno
6. Agustina Alcaraz
7. Magdalena Esquivel
8. Paula Jara
9. Agustina Cáceres
11. Florencia von der Heyde
13. Martina Fredrich
14. Sol Duarte
15. Débora do Nascimento
16. Cintia Amarilla
17. Joaquina Sanabria
18. Constanza González
19. Lumila Pigerl
20. Alexia Gularte
(Santa Fe Province) Rosario

Litoral's Hockey Association

Head coach: José Luis Oro

1. Mayra Arancibia
2. Paula Mutti
3. Bianca Stachiotti
4. Ornella Granitto
5. Candela Nobile
6. María José Algrain
7. María Araujo
8. Pilar Larca
9. Clara Ramos
10. Aldana Lovagnini ©
11. Liza Giacomotti
13. Sol Jure
14. Denise Wasinski
15. Martina Ferrazini
16. Paula Montoya
17. María Corbelli
18. Camila Andre
19. Giuliana Ruggieri (Italy)
(Santa Fe Province) Santa Fe

Santa Fe's Hockey Federation

Head coach: Ariel Pérez Carli

1. Cecilia Pastor
2. Daniela Battle Casas
3. Gina Raviolo
5. Celina Traverso © (Italy)
6. Natalia Ravasio
7. Yosi Kakazú
8. Celina Basilio
9. Pamela Kuxhaus
10. Florencia Villar
11. Corina Diez
13. Rocío Caldíz
14. Gracia Villar
15. Georgina Bernia
16. Stefanía Antoniazzi
17. Ximena Mendoza
18. Sol Villar
19. Josefina Orellano
20. Carolina Arregui
21. Yoana Aguilera
(Tucumán Province) Tucumán

Tucumán's Hockey Association

Head coach: Alberto Darnay

1. Ivanna Gómez
2. Camila Machin
3. Ana Gray
4. Guadalupe López
5. Victoria Sauze (Argentina)
6. Tania Cruz
8. Cecilia Gómez
9. Valentina Garretón
10. Sofía Darnay ©
11. Graciana Peluffo
12. Sol Retondo
13. Paula Gutiérrez
14. Araceli Herrera
15. Noel Rojas
16. Carla Moyano
17. Ana Paula Riera
18. Lucía Allier
19. Calatina Giusta

== Results ==
=== Pool A ===
Pos	Team	Pld	W	D	L	GF	GA	GD	Pts
1	(Mendoza Province) Mendoza	2	2	0	0	6	2	+4	6
2	(Santa Fe Province) Rosario	2	1	0	1	2	3	−1	3
3	(Santa Fe Province) Santa Fe	2	0	1	1	3	4	−1	1
4	Buenos Aires	2	0	1	1	4	6	−2	1

Source: "Schedule" (PDF).
Rules for classification: 1) points; 2) goal difference; 3) goals scored; 4) head-to-head result.

3 October 2019
11:40

Santa Fe (Santa Fe Province)	1 - 2	(Santa Fe Province) Rosario
Kakazú 38'		8' Jure; 55' Ruggieri

3 October 2019
11:40

Buenos Aires	2 - 4	(Mendoza Province) Mendoza
Rinaldi 23'; C. Gluch 40'		3' Jardel; 46' Thome Gustavino; 48' J. Medici; 56' D'Elía

3 October 2019
20:00

Buenos Aires	2 - 2	(Santa Fe Province) Santa Fe
Gorzelany 35'; Rinaldi 54'		20' Kuxhaus; 47' Ravasio

3 October 2019
20:00

Mendoza (Mendoza Province)	2 - 0	(Santa Fe Province) Rosario
Palet 14'; Tapia 56'

4 October 2019
15:00

Santa Fe (Santa Fe Province)	v	(Mendoza Province) Mendoza

4 October 2019
15:00

Buenos Aires	v	(Santa Fe Province) Rosario

=== Pool B ===
Pos	Team	Pld	W	D	L	GF	GA	GD	Pts
1	(Córdoba Province, Argentina) Córdoba	2	2	0	0	10	1	+9	6
2	(Buenos Aires Province) Bahía Blanca	2	1	1	0	5	1	+4	4
3	(Tucumán Province) Tucuman	2	0	1	1	2	5	−3	1
4	(Misiones Province) Misiones	1	0	0	1	0	4	−4	0

Source: "Schedule" (PDF).
Rules for classification: 1) points; 2) goal difference; 3) goals scored; 4) head-to-head result.

3 October 2019
10:00

Bahía Blanca (Buenos Aires Province)	4 - 0	(Misiones Province) Misiones
L. Argüello 11'; Costa Biondi 21'; Lertora 23', 41'

3 October 2019
10:00

Tucumán (Tucumán Province)	1 - 4	(Córdoba Province, Argentina) Córdoba
Machin 53'		19', 39' Rübenacker; 24' Jankunas; 49' Ceballos

3 October 2019
18:20

Córdoba (Córdoba Province, Argentina)	6 - 0	(Misiones Province) Misiones
Rübenacker 10'; Jankunas 16', 23', 25'; Funes 29'; Ceballos 49'

3 October 2019
18:20

Tucumán (Tucumán Province)	1 - 1	(Buenos Aires Province) Bahía Blanca
Garretón 59'		59' Mazars

4 October 2019
16:40

Bahía Blanca (Buenos Aires Province)	v	(Córdoba Province, Argentina) Córdoba

4 October 2019
16:40

Tucumán (Tucumán Province)	v	(Misiones Province) Misiones

== Awards ==
- Best player of the tournament: Julieta Jankunas
- Best player at the final: Gianella Palet
- Best goalkeeper: Paula Pasquetín
- Top goalscorer: Julieta Jankunas

== Final standings ==
Team	Position
(Mendoza Province) Mendoza	1st place, gold medalist(s)
(Córdoba Province, Argentina) Córdoba	2nd place, silver medalist(s)
(Buenos Aires Province) Bahía Blanca	3rd place, bronze medalist(s)
Buenos Aires	4th
(Santa Fe Province) Litoral	5th
(Santa Fe Province) Santa Fe	6th
(Misiones Province) Misiones	7th ▼
(Tucumán Province) Tucumán	8th ▼
