= 2017 Argentina Women's Hockey National Tournament =

Tournament details
- Host country: Argentina
- City: Salta
- Dates: 24-27 August
- Teams: 8

Final positions
- Champions: Buenos Aires

Tournament statistics
- Matches played: 20
- Top scorer(s): Pilar Narvaez Guirado; Delfina Thome Gustavino (5 goals)

The 2017 Argentina Women's Hockey National Tournament was the 9th edition of the women's national tournament. It was held from 24 to 27 August 2017 in Salta, Argentina.

Buenos Aires won the tournament for the fourth time after defeating Mendoza 3–1 in the final.

== Squads ==
Players followed with a country flag are those involved in its senior national team.

Buenos Aires

Amateur Field Hockey Association of Buenos Aires

Head Coach: Fernando Ferrara

- 1 - Clara Barberi (Argentina)
- 2 - Emilia Forcherio
- 3 - Francesca Giovanelli
- 4 - Luciana Galimberti
- 5 - María José Fernández
- 6 - Agostina Alonso (Argentina)
- 7 - Agustina Albertario (Argentina)
- 8 - Geraldine Fresco Pisani ©
- 9 - Carla Dupuy
- 10 - Ana López Basavilbaso
- 11 - Victoria Granatto
- 12 - Marisol Saenz
- 13 - Magdalena Fernández Ladra (Argentina)
- 14 - Agustina Habif (Argentina)
- 15 - Mercedes Socino (Italy)
- 16 - Ivana Dell'Era
- 17 - Estefanía Cascallares
- 18 - Ivanna Pessina (Italy)
- 19 - Antonella Rinaldi
- 20 - María José Granatto (Argentina)
(Buenos Aires Province) Mar del Plata

Mar del Plata's Hockey Association

Head Coach: Franco Pezzelato

- 1 - Julieta Caminiti
- 2 - Virginia Badra
- 3 - Luz Goñi
- 4 - Camila Palumbo
- 5 - Manuela Marrone
- 6 - Yesica Juárez
- 7 - Carolina Martínez
- 8 - Andrea Pedetta ©
- 9 - Agustina Álvarez
- 10 - Victoria Chioli
- 11 - Gloria Scenna
- 12 - Agustina Arista
- 13 - Lucía Yohai del Cerro
- 14 - Eugenia Guerrero
- 15 - Soledad Ayesa
- 16 - Gisela Carretero
- 17 - Yanina García
- 18 - Pía Goñi
- 19 - Sofía Paglione
- 20 - Agustina Buquicchio
(Córdoba Province, Argentina) Córdoba

Córdoba's Hockey Federation

Head Coach: Santiago Fuentes

- 1 - Paula Pasquetin
- 2 - Paula Bortoletto
- 3 - Sofía Funes
- 4 - Florencia Nogueira
- 5 - Paulina Forte
- 6 - Sol Rodríguez Osse
- 7 - Emilia Alonso González
- 8 - Victoria Miranda
- 9 - Julieta Jankunas © (Argentina)
- 10 - Celeste Soria
- 11 - Justina Paz
- 12 - Agustina D'Ascola
- 13 - Victoria Lorenzatti
- 14 - Laura González
- 15 - Carmela Briski Portela
- 16 - Julieta Torres
- 17 - Florencia Ametller
- 18 - Emilia Inaudi
- 19 - Julieta Ceballos
(Mendoza Province) Mendoza

Mendoza's Hockey Association

Head Coach: Lucas Ghilardi di Cesare

- 1 - Florencia Saravia ©
- 2 - Analía Belda
- 3 - Luz Rosso
- 4 - Micaela Conna
- 5 - Gabriela Koltes
- 6 - Valentina Esley
- 7 - Carolina Armani
- 8 - Julieta Medici
- 9 - Delfina Thome Gustavino
- 10 - Bárbara Muzaber
- 11 - Eugenia Mastronardi (Italy)
- 12 - Mariana Scandura
- 13 - Priscila Jardel (Argentina)
- 14 - Agustina Cabrejas Reyes
- 15 - Silvina D'Elía
- 16 - Sofía Vercelli
- 17 - Antonella Rosato
- 18 - Sofía Avedaño
- 19 - Marcela Casale (Italy)
- 20 - Luciana Molina
(Misiones Province) Misiones

Misiones Hockey Federation

Head Coach: Mauricio Benitez

- 1 - Nayibe Zampaca
- 2 - Adriana Salas
- 3 - Melisa Figueredo
- 4 - Paola Bogado
- 5 - Noelia Sanabria
- 6 - Daniela Pegoraro
- 7 - Paula Antueno Quintana
- 8 - Paula Jara
- 9 - Lumila Pigerl
- 10 - Carla Curbello
- 11 - Lucina von der Heyde © (Argentina)
- 12 - Silvina Barrios
- 13 - Eugenia Filich
- 14 - Agustina Alcaraz
- 15 - Alexia Gularte
- 16 - Rosa Batista
- 17 - Sol Duarte
- 18 - Constanza González
- 19 - Victoria Boichuk
- 20 - Magdalena Esquivel
(Salta Province) Salta

Salta's Hockey Association

Head Coach: Joaquín Zaiontz

- 1 - Rocío Veleizan
- 3 - Agostina González Saavedra
- 4 - Constanza Aldao Vittar
- 5 - Renata Morosini
- 6 - Camila Huber
- 7 - Macarena Pescador
- 8 - Mercedes Saavedra ©
- 9 - Ivanna Aguirre
- 10 - Constanza Gómez
- 11 - Virginia Stieglitz
- 12 - Ayelén Salazar Camilo
- 13 - Gabriela Aguirre
- 14 - Andrea del Frari Crespo
- 15 - Rosario Villagra
- 16 - Inés Ryan
- 18 - Ana Medina
- 19 - Camila Gómez
- 20 - Jorgelina Maciel Peralta
- 21 - Laura Aguirre
- 22 - Ailín Martínez
(San Juan Province, Argentina) San Juan

San Juan's Hockey Association

Head Coach: Osvaldo Astorga

- 1 - Julieta Cheruse
- 2 - Cecilia López Murua
- 3 - Tatiana Risueño Guarino
- 5 - Agostina Donnici
- 6 - Renata Morosini
- 7 - Carina Guzman
- 8 - Micaela Carrizo Ocampo
- 9 - Julieta Luna ©
- 10 - Clarisa Narvaez Guirado
- 11 - Josefina Otto
- 12 - Soledad Montilla Guimaraes
- 13 - Pilar Narvaez Guirado
- 14 - Guadalupe Ruiz
- 15 - Sol Pujador
- 16 - Viviana Perisotto
- 17 - Lourdes Ruiz
- 18 - Evelyn Barquiel
- 20 - Verónica Perisotto
(Tucumán Province) Tucumán

Tucumán's Hockey Association

Head Coach: Alberto Darnay

- 1 - Paulina Carrizo
- 2 - Sofía Darnay
- 3 - Victoria Sauze (Argentina)
- 4 - Agustina Barreiro
- 5 - Carla Moyano
- 6 - Camila Machín ©
- 7 - Julieta Rodríguez
- 8 - Sofía Curia
- 9 - Florencia Klimbowsky
- 10 - Tania Cruz
- 11 - Fernanda Martínez
- 12 - Sandra Salazar
- 13 - Emidia Nuñez López
- 14 - Araceli Herrera
- 15 - Noel Rojas
- 16 - Amparo Renta Mora
- 17 - Josefina Pardo
- 18 - Andrea Strukov
- 19 - Giuliana Calliera
- 20 - Guadalupe Gallardo

== Results ==
=== Pool A ===
Pos	Team	Pld	W	D	L	GF	GA	GD	Pts
1	Buenos Aires	3	3	0	0	14	3	+11	9
2	(Córdoba Province, Argentina) Córdoba	3	1	1	1	8	4	+4	4
3	(Buenos Aires Province) Mar del Plata	3	0	1	2	4	12	−8	1
4	(San Juan Province, Argentina) San Juan	3	1	0	2	8	15	−7	3

Rules for classification: 1) points; 2) goal difference; 3) goals scored; 4) head-to-head result.

24 August 2017
09:00

Buenos Aires	3–1	(Córdoba Province, Argentina) Córdoba
M. Granatto 23'; Albertario 25'; Rinaldi 36'		Jankunas 45'

24 August 2017
09:00

Mar del Plata (Buenos Aires Province)	2–7	(San Juan Province, Argentina) San Juan
C. Narvaez Guirado 5'; P. Narvaez Guirado 8', 28', 36'; Luna 26'; Risueño Guarino 47'; Otto 56'		Scenna 11'; Ayesa 40'

24 August 2017
16:00

Buenos Aires	5–2	(Buenos Aires Province) Mar del Plata
Albertario 14'; Rinaldi 24'; M. Granatto 33'; Socino 53'; Dupuy 59'		García 3'; Palumbo 37'

24 August 2017
16:00

Córdoba (Córdoba Province, Argentina)	7–1	(San Juan Province, Argentina) San Juan
Ceballos 4', 47'; Soria 20'; Jankunas 25', 46'; Paz 42'; Funes 45'		Ruiz 41'

25 August 2017
14:15

Mar del Plata (Buenos Aires Province)	0–0	(Córdoba Province, Argentina) Córdoba

25 August 2017
14:15

Buenos Aires	6–0	(San Juan Province, Argentina) San Juan
M. Granatto 3'; Cascallares 21', 51'; Fernández 26'; López Basavilbaso 30'; Rinaldi 47'

=== Pool B ===
Pos	Team	Pld	W	D	L	GF	GA	GD	Pts
1	(Mendoza Province) Mendoza	6	3	3	0	10	1	+9	12
2	(Misiones Province) Misiones	3	0	0	3	3	11	−8	0
3	(Salta Province) Salta	3	1	1	1	4	6	−2	4
4	(Tucumán Province) Tucumán	3	1	1	1	4	0	+4	4

Rules for classification: 1) points; 2) goal difference; 3) goals scored; 4) head-to-head result.

24 August 2017
12:30

Mendoza (Mendoza Province)	5–1	(Misiones Province) Misiones
Belda 1', 43'; Medici 12'; Esley 13'; D'Elía 23'		von der Heyde 42'

24 August 2017
19:00

Tucumán (Tucumán Province)	1–1	(Salta Province) Salta
Curia 20'		C. Gómez 53'

25 August 2017
10:45

Mendoza (Mendoza Province)	2–0	(Tucumán Province) Tucumán
Thome Gustavino 33'; D'Elía 49'

25 August 2017
10:45

Misiones (Misiones Province)	2–3	(Salta Province) Salta
Boichuk 1'; Salas 44'		Morosoni 6'; Martínez 24'; Aguirre 41'

25 August 2017
17:45

Tucumán (Tucumán Province)	3–0	(Misiones Province) Misiones
Sauze 24', 39'; Núñez López 53'

25 August 2017
17:45

Mendoza (Mendoza Province)	3–0	(Salta Province) Salta
Thome Gustavino 29', 37'; Belda 51'

=== Second round ===
Crossover
26 August
(San Juan Province, Argentina) San Juan	4
(Misiones Province) Misiones	2
26 August
(Salta Province) Salta	2
(Buenos Aires Province) Mar del Plata	0

Fifth place
27 August
(San Juan Province, Argentina) San Juan	2
(Salta Province) Salta	3
Seventh place
27 August
(Misiones Province) Misiones	1
(Buenos Aires Province) Mar del Plata	3

==== Quarterfinals ====
26 August 2017
08:00

San Juan (San Juan Province, Argentina)	4–2	(Misiones Province) Misiones

26 August 2017
08:00

Salta (Salta Province)	2–0	(Buenos Aires Province) Mar del Plata

===== Seventh place game =====
27 August 2017
13:15

Misiones (Misiones Province)	1–3	(Buenos Aires Province) Mar del Plata

===== Fifth place game =====
13 May
14:00

San Juan (San Juan Province, Argentina)	2–3	(Salta Province) Salta

=== Medal round ===
Semi-finals
26 August
Buenos Aires	2
(Tucumán Province) Tucumán	0
26 August
(Mendoza Province) Mendoza	3
(Córdoba Province, Argentina) Córdoba	1

Final
27 August
Buenos Aires	3
(Mendoza Province) Mendoza	1
Third place
27 August
(Tucumán Province) Tucumán	2
(Córdoba Province, Argentina) Córdoba	1

==== Quarterfinals ====
26 August 2017
13:15

Buenos Aires	2–0	(Tucumán Province)
Fresco Pisani 4'; López Basavilbaso 57'

26 August 2017
16:45

Mendoza (Mendoza Province)	3–1	(Córdoba Province, Argentina) Córdoba
Thome Gustavino 32', 59'; Jardel 57'		Funes 19'

===== Third place game =====
27 August 2017
09:45

Tucumán (Tucumán Province)	2–1	(Córdoba Province, Argentina) Córdoba
Barreiro 15'; Sauze 28'		Funes 59'

===== Final =====
27 August 2017
13:15

Buenos Aires	3–1	(Mendoza Province) Mendoza
Rinaldi 16'; M. Granatto 18'; Giovanelli 47'		Esley 27'

== Awards ==
Top Goalscorer	Player of the Tournament	Goalkeeper of the Tournament
(San Juan Province, Argentina) Pilar Narvaez Guirado (Mendoza Province) Delfina Thome Gustavino		

== Statistics ==
=== Final standings ===
1. Buenos Aires
2. (Mendoza Province) Mendoza
3. (Tucumán Province) Tucumán
4. (Córdoba Province, Argentina) Córdoba
5. (Salta Province) Salta
6. (San Juan Province, Argentina) San Juan
7. (Buenos Aires Province) Mar del Plata ▼
8. (Misiones Province) Misiones ▼
