= Field hockey at the 2014 Summer Youth Olympics =

Field hockey at the II Summer Youth Olympic Games
- Venue: Youth Olympic Sports Park
- Dates: 17–27 August
- No. of events: 2 (1 boys, 1 girls)

The tournament of field hockey at the 2014 Summer Youth Olympics was held from 17 to 27 August at the Youth Olympic Sports Park in Nanjing, China. This Youth Olympics marked the debut of Hockey 5s, a 5-a-side tournament that is played on a smaller field size.

== Qualification ==
A total of 10 teams will participate in each gender. Each National Olympic Committee (NOC) can enter a maximum of 2 teams of 9 athletes, 1 per each gender. Each of the five continents hosted a qualification tournament where the top two teams qualified. As hosts, China chose to compete in the girls' tournament and therefore took one of the two available Asian spots.

To be eligible to participate at the Youth Olympics, athletes must have been born between 1 January 1996 and 31 December 1999.

=== Boys ===
Event	Location	Date	Total Places	Qualified
Host Nation	-	-	0	~~China~~
2013 Under 16 Asian Cup	Singapore	4–7 April 2013	2	Bangladesh; Pakistan
2013 Youth European Championship	(Austria) Vienna	22–28 July 2013	2	Germany; Spain
2014 Youth American Championship	(Puerto Rico) San Juan	4–8 February 2014	2	~~Argentina~~; Canada; Mexico
Oceanian Qualification Tournament	(Vanuatu) Port Vila	8–11 March 2014	2	Australia; New Zealand
African Qualification Tournament	(Zambia) Lusaka	10–15 March 2014	2	South Africa; Zambia
TOTAL			10	

=== Girls ===
Event	Location	Date	Total Places	Qualified
Host Nation	-	-	1	China
2013 Youth European Championship	(Republic of Ireland) Dublin	29 Jul–4 Aug 2013	2	Germany; Netherlands
2013 Under 16 Asian Cup	(Thailand) Bangkok	2–6 October 2013	1	Japan
2014 Pan American Youth Championship	(Uruguay) Montevideo	11–15 February 2014	2	Argentina; Uruguay
Oceanian Qualification Tournament	(Vanuatu) Port Vila	8–11 March 2014	2	Fiji; New Zealand
African Qualification Tournament	(Zambia) Lusaka	10–15 March 2014	2	South Africa; Zambia
TOTAL			10	

== Schedule ==
The schedule was released by the Nanjing Youth Olympic Games Organizing Committee. Each day during the group stage contained four boys' matches and four girls' matches.

All times are CST (UTC+8)

Event date	Event day	Starting time	Event details
August 17	Sunday	16:00	Boys' Group Stage; Girls' Group Stage
August 18	Monday	16:00	Boys' Group Stage; Girls' Group Stage
August 19	Tuesday	16:00	Boys' Group Stage; Girls' Group Stage
August 20	Wednesday	16:00	Boys' Group Stage; Girls' Group Stage
August 21	Thursday	16:00	Boys' Group Stage; Girls' Group Stage
August 23	Saturday	16:00	Boys' Quarterfinals; Girls' Quarterfinals
August 24	Sunday	16:00	Girls' 9-10 Place Match; Girls' 5-8 Semifinals; Girls' Semifinals
August 25	Monday	16:00	Boys' 9-10 Place Match; Boys' 5-8 Semifinals; Boys' Semifinals
August 26	Tuesday	16:00	Girls' Placement Matches
August 27	Wednesday	16:00	Boys' Placement Matches

== Medal summary ==
=== Medal table ===
Rank	Nation	Gold	Silver	Bronze	Total
1	Australia (AUS)	1	0	0	1
1	China (CHN)	1	0	0	1
3	Canada (CAN)	0	1	0	1
3	Netherlands (NED)	0	1	0	1
5	Argentina (ARG)	0	0	1	1
5	Spain (ESP)	0	0	1	1
Totals (6 entries)		2	2	2	6

=== Events ===
Event	Gold	Silver	Bronze
Boys'	Australia; Matthew Bird; Jonathan Bretherton; Max Hendry; Tim Howard; Max Hughes; Alec Rasmussen; Nathanael Stewart; Mackenzie Warne; Corey Weyer	Canada; Parmeet Gill; Liam Manning; Floyd Mascarenhas; Braedon Muldoon; Balraj Panesar; Brandon Pereira; Vikramjeet Sandhu; Arshjit Sidhu; Harbir Sidhu	Spain; Maunel Bordas; Jordi Farres Palet; Lucas Garcia Alcalde; Marcos Giralt Ripol; Enrique González; Jan Lara; Pol Parrilla; Llorenç Piera; Joan Tarrés
Girls'	China; Chen Yang; Li Hong; Liu Kailin; Shen Yang; Tu Yidan; Zhang Jinrong; Zhang Lijia; Zhang Xindan; Zhong Jiaqi	Netherlands; Karlijn Adank; Michelle Fillet; Kyra Fortuin; Maxime Kerstholt; Frédérique Matla; Marijn Veen; Carmen Wijsman; Ginella Zerbo; Elin van Erk	Argentina; Cristina Cosentino; Bárbara Dichiara; Julieta Jankunas; Macarena Losada; Maria Ortiz; Micaela Retegui; Delfina Thome Gustavino; Sofía Toccalino; Eugenia Trinchinetti
