= 2018 Argentina Women's Hockey National Tournament =

Tournament details
- Host country: Argentina
- City: Buenos Aires
- Dates: 10–13 May
- Teams: 8

Final positions
- Champions: Buenos Aires
- Runner-up: (Tucumán Province) Tucumán
- Third place: (Buenos Aires Province) Bahía Blanca

Tournament statistics
- Matches played: 20
- Goals scored: 62 (3.1 per match)
- Top scorer(s): (Buenos Aires) María José Granatto (5 goals)
- Best player: (Buenos Aires Province) Bianca Donati
- Best goalkeeper: (Tucumán Province) Paulina Carrizo

The 2018 Argentina Women's Hockey National Tournament was the 10th edition of the women's national tournament. It was held from 10 to 13 May 2018 in Buenos Aires, Argentina.

Buenos Aires won the tournament for the fifth time after defeating Tucumán 2–0 in the final.

== Squads ==
Players followed with a country flag are those involved in its senior national team.

Buenos Aires

Amateur Field Hockey Association of Buenos Aires

Head Coach: Fernando Ferrara

- 1 - Belén Succi (Argentina)
- 2 - Emilia Forcherio
- 3 - Francesca Giovanelli
- 4 - Pilar Campoy (Argentina)
- 5 - Agostina Alonso (Argentina)
- 6 - Macarena Rojas
- 7 - Agustina Albertario (Argentina)
- 8 - Geraldine Fresco Pisani ©
- 9 - Carla Dupuy
- 10 - Ana López Basavilbaso
- 11 - Magdalena Fernández Ladra (Argentina)
- 12 - Mercedes Díaz Moraiz
- 13 - Mercedes Socino (Italy)
- 14 - Agustina Habif (Argentina)
- 15 - María José Granatto (Argentina)
- 16 - Estefanía Cascallares
- 17 - Delfina Merino (Argentina)
- 18 - Luciana Galimberti
- 19 - Antonela Rinaldi
- 20 - Ivanna Pessina (Italy)
(Buenos Aires Province) Bahía Blanca

Bahía Blanca's Hockey Association

Head Coach: Martín Berlato

- 1 - Marina Urruti
- 2 - Bianca Donati (Argentina)
- 3 - Agostina Dottori
- 4 - Bárbara Dichiara (Argentina)
- 5 - Florencia Scheverin ©
- 6 - Micaela Gentili
- 7 - Eugenia Urruti
- 8 - Valentina Zamborain
- 9 - Luciana Argüello Acuña
- 10 - Valentina Costa Biondi
- 11 - Julieta Kluin
- 12 - Lucía López Izarra
- 13 - Melany Cardenas
- 14 - Itatí Ruilopez
- 15 - Gabriela Ludueña
- 16 - Carola Dichiara
- 17 - Lucila Martínez Arana
- 18 - Josefina Calio
- 19 - Florencia Vallejos
(Córdoba Province, Argentina) Córdoba

Córdoba's Hockey Federation

Head Coach: Santiago Fuentes

- 1 - Paula Pasquetin
- 2 - Laura González
- 3 - Camila Broglia
- 4 - Paula Bortoletto
- 5 - Carmela Briski
- 6 - Martina Quetglas
- 7 - Paulina Forte ©
- 8 - Juliana Ríos Ferreyra
- 9 - Julieta Jankunas (Argentina)
- 10 - Emilia Inaudi
- 11 - Valentina Braconi (Italy)
- 12 - Agustina D'Ascola
- 13 - Agustina Somerfeld
- 14 - Justina Paz
- 16 - Emilia Alonso González
- 17 - Candelaria Paroli
- 18 - Victoria Miranda
- 19 - Paz Villegas
- 20 - Sofía Funes
(Mendoza Province) Mendoza

Mendoza's Hockey Association

Head Coach: Fernanda Carrascosa

- 1 - Florencia Saravia
- 2 - Lucía Tapia
- 4 - Sofía Avendaño
- 5 - Gabriela Koltes ©
- 6 - Micaela Conna
- 7 - Agustina Cabrejas
- 8 - Florencia Barbera
- 9 - Eugenia Mastronardi (Italy)
- 10 - Bárbara Muzaber
- 11 - Delfina Thome Gustavino
- 12 - Mariana Scandura
- 13 - Priscila Jardel (Argentina)
- 14 - Valentina Esley
- 15 - Julieta Medici
- 16 - Sofía Vercelli
- 17 - Chiara Medici
- 18 - Luciana Molina
- 19 - Sofía Montaña
(Salta Province) Salta

Salta's Hockey Association

Head Coach: Ana Medina

- 1 - Clara Salazar Camilo
- 3 - Constanza Abudi Flores
- 4 - Carla Giampaoli
- 5 - Rosario Villagra
- 6 - Mariana Gea Salim
- 7 - Macarena Pescador
- 8 - Mercedes Saavedra ©
- 9 - Victoria Carrizo
- 10 - Constanza Gómez
- 11 - Virginia Stieglitz
- 12 - Ana Cortez Navarro
- 14 - Andrea del Frari Crespo
- 15 - Gimena Cortez Navarro
- 16 - Celeste Gómez
- 18 - Giuliana Torcivia
- 19 - Camila Gómez
- 20 - Jorgelina Maciel Peralta
- 22 - Ailín Martínez
(San Juan Province, Argentina) San Juan

San Juan's Hockey Association

Head Coach: Maximilano Díaz

- 1 - Julieta Cheruse
- 2 - Julieta Luna
- 3 - Tatiana Risueño Guarino
- 4 - Sol Pujador
- 5 - Florencia Morales
- 6 - Carina Guzmán
- 7 - Clarisa Narvaez Guirado
- 8 - Evelyn Barquiel
- 9 - Viviana Perisotto
- 10 - Luciana Agudo
- 11 - Pilar Graffigna
- 12 - Victoria Gómez Trigo
- 13 - Pilar Narvaez Guirado ©
- 14 - Martina Nozica
- 15 - Guadalupe Ruíz Yacante
- 16 - Josefina Otto
- 17 - Rosario Dubos
- 18 - Verónica Perisotto
- 19 - Cecilia López Murua
- 20 - Micaela Carrizo
(Santa Fe Province) Santa Fe

Santa Fe's Hockey Federation

Head Coach: Maximilano Díaz

- 1 - Cecilia Pastor
- 2 - Carla Miraglio
- 3 - Celina Basilio
- 4 - Ximena Mendoza
- 5 - Celina Traverso © (Italy)
- 6 - Stefanía Antoniazzi
- 7 - Corina Diez
- 8 - Natalia Ravasio
- 9 - Yoana Aguilera
- 10 - Florencia Villar
- 11 - Luciana Pimpinella
- 12 - Magdalena Chemes
- 13 - Carolina Arregui
- 14 - Gracia Villar
- 15 - Candela Carosso
- 16 - Milagros Escudero
- 17 - Josefina Salamano
- 18 - Sol Villar
- 19 - Georgina Bernia
- 20 - Pilar de Biase (Italy)
(Tucumán Province) Tucumán

Tucumán's Hockey Association

Head Coach: Alberto Darnay

- 1 - Paulina Carrizo
- 2 - Carolina Lobo
- 3 - Ana Gray
- 4 - Guadalupe Novillo
- 5 - Victoria Sauze (Argentina)
- 6 - Tania Cruz
- 7 - Solana Olmedo
- 8 - Sofía Curia
- 9 - Guadalupe Gallardo
- 10 - Sofía Darnay
- 11 - Karen Gordillo
- 12 - Ivanna Gómez Rodríguez
- 13 - Noel Rojas
- 14 - Agustina Barreiro
- 15 - Carla Moyano
- 16 - Camila Machín © (Argentina)
- 17 - Florencia Klimbowsky
- 18 - Valentina Garretón
- 19 - Lucía Allier
- 20 - Emidia Núñez López

== Results ==
=== Pool A ===
Pos	Team	Pld	W	D	L	GF	GA	GD	Pts
1	Buenos Aires	3	3	0	0	10	4	+6	9
2	(Buenos Aires Province) Bahía Blanca	3	2	0	1	4	3	+1	6
3	(Córdoba Province, Argentina) Córdoba	3	1	0	2	5	6	−1	3
4	(Salta Province) Salta	3	0	0	3	2	8	−6	0

Rules for classification: 1) points; 2) goal difference; 3) goals scored; 4) head-to-head result.

10 May 2018
08:30

Buenos Aires	4–1	(Salta Province) Salta
Merino 2', 48'; Granatto 5'; Fernández Ladra 19'		Saavedra 38'

10 May 2018
08:30

Córdoba (Córdoba Province, Argentina)	0–2	(Buenos Aires Province) Bahía Blanca
		Argüello Acuña 8'; B. Dichiara 28'

10 May 2018
18:10

Buenos Aires	3–2	(Córdoba Province, Argentina) Córdoba
Granatto 16', 43'; López Basavilbaso 40'		Braconi 4'; Jankunas 38'

10 May 2018
18:10

Salta (Salta Province)	0–1	(Buenos Aires Province) Bahía Blanca
		Urruti 54'

12 May 2018
08:30

Córdoba (Córdoba Province, Argentina)	3–1	(Salta Province) Salta
Funes 3'; Braconi 11'; Paz 59'}		Gómez 38'

12 May 2018
08:30

Buenos Aires	3–1	(Buenos Aires Province) Bahía Blanca
Granatto 13'; Fernández Ladra 14'; López Basavilbaso 24'		Urruti 35'

=== Pool B ===
Pos	Team	Pld	W	D	L	GF	GA	GD	Pts
1	(Mendoza Province) Mendoza	3	1	2	0	3	1	+2	5
2	(San Juan Province, Argentina) San Juan	3	0	0	3	1	9	−8	0
3	(Santa Fe Province) Santa Fe	3	1	2	0	4	2	+2	5
4	(Tucumán Province) Tucumán	3	1	2	0	4	0	+4	5

Rules for classification: 1) points; 2) goal difference; 3) goals scored; 4) head-to-head result.

11 May 2018
10:10

Tucumán (Tucumán Province)	0–0	(Santa Fe Province) Santa Fe

11 May 2018
10:10

Mendoza (Mendoza Province)	2–0	(San Juan Province, Argentina) San Juan
Muzaber 12'; Molina 22'

11 May 2018
16:50

Mendoza (Mendoza Province)	0–0	(Tucumán Province) Tucumán

11 May 2018
16:50

San Juan (San Juan Province, Argentina)	1–3	(Santa Fe Province) Santa Fe
Agudo 57'		Ravasio 15'; Bernia 18', 54'

12 May 2018
10:10

Tucumán (Tucumán Province)	4–0	(San Juan Province, Argentina) San Juan
Curia 3', 23'; Gallardo 8'; Machín 13'

12 May 2018
10:10

Mendoza (Mendoza Province)	1–1	(Santa Fe Province) Santa Fe
J. Medici 42'		de Biase 39'

=== Second round ===
Crossover
12 May
(Córdoba Province, Argentina) Córdoba	2 (3)
(San Juan Province, Argentina) San Juan	2 (2)
12 May
(Mendoza Province) Mendoza	3
(Salta Province) Salta	1

Fifth place
13 May
(Córdoba Province, Argentina) Córdoba	1
(Mendoza Province) Mendoza	2
Seventh place
13 May
(San Juan Province, Argentina) San Juan	2
(Salta Province) Salta	5

==== Quarterfinals ====
12 May
12:30

Córdoba (Córdoba Province, Argentina)	2 (3)– 2 (2)	(San Juan Province, Argentina) San Juan
Funes 9', 33'		Risueño Guarino 8', 11'

12 May
16:30

Mendoza (Mendoza Province)	3-1	(Salta Province) Salta
Jardel 25', 28'; Mastronardi 52'		Ca. Gómez 6'

===== Seventh place game =====
13 May
10:00

San Juan (San Juan Province, Argentina)	2–5	(Salta Province) Salta
Risueño Guarino 26'; Morales 45'		del Frari 4'; Pescador 24'; Co. Gómez 33'; Martínez 34'; Ce. Gómez 38'

===== Fifth place game =====
13 May
10:00

Córdoba (Córdoba Province, Argentina)	1–2	(Mendoza Province) Mendoza
Ríos 58'		Barbera 39'; J. Medici 50'

=== Medal round ===
Semi-finals
12 May
Buenos Aires	5
(Santa Fe Province) Santa Fe	0
12 May
(Tucumán Province) Tucumán	0 (6)
(Buenos Aires Province) Bahía Blanca	0 (5)

Final
13 May
Buenos Aires	2
(Tucumán Province) Tucumán	0
Third place
13 May
(Santa Fe Province) Santa Fe	2 (3)
(Buenos Aires Province) Bahía Blanca	2 (4)

==== Quarterfinals ====
12 May
10:30

Buenos Aires	5–0	(Santa Fe Province) Santa Fe
Fresco Pisani 1'; Albertario 21', 58'; Campoy 44'; Granatto 45'

12 May
12:30

Bahía Blanca (Buenos Aires Province)	0 (5)–0 (6)	(Tucumán Province) Tucumán

===== Third place game =====
13 May
10:00

Santa Fe (Santa Fe Province)	2 (3)–2 (4)	(Buenos Aires Province) Bahía Blanca
de Biase 7'; Aguilera 27'		Ludueña 55', 57'

===== Final =====
13 May
14:00

Buenos Aires	2–0	(Tucumán Province) Tucumán
Habif 50'; Granatto 55'

== Awards ==
Top Goalscorer	Player of the Tournament	Goalkeeper of the Tournament
(Buenos Aires) María José Granatto	(Buenos Aires Province) Bianca Donati	(Tucumán Province) Paulina Carrizo

== Final standings ==
1. Buenos Aires
2. (Tucumán Province) Tucumán
3. (Buenos Aires Province) Bahía Blanca
4. (Santa Fe Province) Santa Fe
5. (Mendoza Province) Mendoza
6. (Córdoba Province, Argentina) Córdoba
7. (Salta Province) Salta ▼
8. (San Juan Province, Argentina) San Juan ▼
