= 2016 Argentina Women's Hockey National Tournament =

Tournament details
- Host country: Argentina
- City: Tucumán
- Dates: 27-30 October
- Teams: 8

Final positions
- Champions: Buenos Aires

Tournament statistics
- Matches played: 20
- Top scorer: Julieta Jankunas (6 goals)

The 2016 Argentina Women's Hockey National Tournament was the 8th edition of the women's national tournament. It was held from 27 to 30 October 2016 in Tucumán, Argentina.

Buenos Aires won the tournament for the third time after defeating Mendoza 2–1 in the final.

== Squads ==
Players followed with a country flag are those involved in its senior national team.

Buenos Aires

Amateur Field Hockey Association of Buenos Aires

Head Coach: Juan Manuel Casas

- 1 - Clara Barberi
- 2 - Agustina Metidieri
- 3 - Francesca Giovanelli
- 4 - Luciana Galimberti
- 5 - Mariela Scarone
- 6 - Victoria Villalba
- 7 - Victoria Granatto
- 8 - Geraldine Fresco Pisani ©
- 9 - Macarena Rojas
- 10 - Ana López Basavilbaso
- 11 - Lara Oviedo (Italy)
- 12 - Sofía Monserrat
- 13 - Estefanía Cascallares
- 14 - Agustina Habif (Argentina)
- 15 - Mercedes Socino (Italy)
- 16 - Ivana Dell'Era
- 17 - Aldana Hamra
- 18 - María José Fernández
- 19 - Antonela Rinaldi
- 20 - Carolina Azzara
(Buenos Aires Province) Bahía Blanca

Bahía Blanca's Hockey Association

Head Coach: Jesús Sassi

- 1 - Marina Urruti
- 2 - Bianca Donati
- 3 - Eugenia Nimo
- 4 - Bárbara Dichiara
- 5 - Florencia Scheverin ©
- 6 - Martina Orioli
- 7 - Ivana Mazars
- 8 - Valentina Zamborain
- 9 - Luciana Argüello Acuña
- 10 - Valentina Costa Biondi
- 11 - Giselle Juárez (Argentina)
- 12 - Rocío Piñeiro
- 13 - Marina Urruti
- 14 - Itatí Ruilopez
- 15 - Gabriela Ludueña
- 16 - Hebelén Cavicchioli Cornejo
- 17 - Julieta Kluin
- 18 - Jordana Buide
(Buenos Aires Province) Mar del Plata

Mar del Plata's Hockey Association

Head Coach: Franco Pezzelato

- 1 - Julieta Caminiti
- 2 - Virginia Badra
- 3 - Luz Goñi
- 4 - Carolina Labayen
- 5 - Manuela Marrone
- 6 - Maite Buquicchio
- 7 - Carolina Martínez
- 8 - Andrea Pedetta ©
- 9 - Agustina Álvarez
- 10 - Victoria Chioli
- 11 - Victoria Zuloaga (Argentina)
- 12 - Agustina Arista
- 13 - Camila Morteo
- 14 - Eugenia Guerrero
- 15 - Soledad Ayesa
- 16 - Bianca Marinucci
- 17 - Yanina García
- 18 - Felicitas Victorel
- 19 - Sofía Paglione
- 20 - Agustina Buquicchio
(Córdoba Province, Argentina) Córdoba

Córdoba's Hockey Federation

Head Coach: Miguel Rivera

- 1 - Paula Pasquetin
- 2 - Florencia Nogueira
- 3 - Consuelo Rodríguez Díaz
- 4 - Laura González ©
- 5 - Paulina Forte
- 6 - Sofía Funes
- 7 - Celeste Soria
- 8 - Ayelén Roldán
- 9 - Julieta Jankunas (Argentina)
- 10 - Victoria Aguirre
- 11 - Valentina Braconi (Italy)
- 12 - Agustina D'Ascola
- 13 - Sofía Maldonado
- 14 - Carmela Briski
- 15 - Constanza Ontivero
- 16 - Emilia Alonso
- 17 - Natalia Galindez
- 18 - Magdalena Freites
- 19 - Emilia Inaudi
- 20 - Magalí Rinaldi
(Mendoza Province) Mendoza

Mendoza's Hockey Association

Head Coach: Lucas Ghilardi

- 1 - Florencia Saravia
- 2 - Agustina Ricci
- 4 - Carla Palta
- 5 - Macarena Rodríguez
- 6 - Rocío Piña
- 7 - Carolina Armani ©
- 8 - Julieta Medici
- 9 - Sofía Vercelli
- 10 - Bárbara Muzaber
- 11 - Eugenia Mastronardi (Italy)
- 12 - Mariana Scandura
- 13 - Gabriela Koltes
- 14 - Valentina Esley
- 15 - Luciana Molina
- 16 - Marcela Casale (Italy)
- 17 - Belén Placeres
- 18 - Priscila Jardel
- 19 - Sofía Avendaño
- 20 - Magdalena González
(Misiones Province) Misiones

Misiones Hockey Federation

Head Coach: Mauricio Benitez

- 1 - Nayibe Zampaca
- 2 - Eliana von der Heyde
- 3 - Melisa Figueredo
- 4 - Luciana Viarengo
- 5 - Noelia Sanabria
- 6 - Carla Otonello
- 7 - Paula Antueno Quintana
- 8 - Lucina von der Heyde © (Argentina)
- 9 - Paula Jara
- 10 - Sol Boichuk
- 11 - Carla Sabater
- 12 - Silvina Barrios
- 13 - Florencia Jara
- 14 - Victoria Sarjanovich
- 15 - Agustina Alcaraz
- 16 - Victoria Boichuk
- 17 - Magdalena Esquivel
- 18 - Constanza González
- 19 - Daniela Pegoraro
- 20 - Sol Duarte
(Santa Fe Province) Rosario

Litoral's Hockey Federation

Head Coach: Ernesto Morlan

- 1 - Flavia Tabia
- 2 - Luciana Cerrutti
- 3 - Martina Ferrazini
- 4 - Ornella Granitto
- 5 - Camila Torres
- 6 - Yasmin Spinozzi
- 7 - Julia Aphalo
- 8 - Candelaria Calvo
- 9 - Paula Montoya
- 10 - Rocío Caldíz ©
- 11 - Valentina Bisconti Stringhetti
- 12 - Sofía Villarroya
- 13 - Victoria Tettamanzi
- 14 - Roberta Zuccali
- 15 - Cecilia Ricciardino
- 16 - Camila Miranda
- 17 - Nadín Lacas
- 18 - Pilar Larca
- 19 - Sofía Mazón
- 20 - Bernardita Giosa
(Tucumán Province) Tucumán

Tucumán's Hockey Association

Head Coach: Miguel Dulor

- 1 - Sofía Díaz
- 2 - Agustina Buti
- 3 - Sofía Darnay
- 4 - Cecilia Gómez Urrutia
- 5 - Victoria Sauze
- 6 - Camila Machín
- 7 - Nazarena María
- 8 - Emilia Albornoz
- 9 - Claudia Tejerizo
- 10 - Amparo Renta Mora ©
- 11 - Lorena Rueda
- 12 - Solana Novillo
- 13 - Emidia Nuñez López
- 14 - Araceli Herrera
- 15 - Anahí Totongi
- 16 - Florencia Klimbowsky
- 17 - Julieta Rodríguez
- 18 - Julieta Reverso
- 19 - Andrea Strukov
- 20 - Sofía Curia

== Statistics ==
=== Final standings ===
1. Buenos Aires
2. (Mendoza Province) Mendoza
3. (Tucumán Province) Tucumán
4. (Buenos Aires Province) Mar del Plata
5. (Córdoba Province, Argentina) Córdoba
6. (Misiones Province) Misiones
7. (Buenos Aires Province) Bahía Blanca ▼
8. (Santa Fe Province) Rosario ▼
