= 2014 Pan American Youth Championship (girls' field hockey) =

Tournament details
- Host country: Uruguay
- City: Montevideo
- Dates: 11 – 15 February 2014
- Teams: 4

Final positions
- Champions: Argentina (2nd title)
- Runner-up: Uruguay
- Third place: United States

Tournament statistics
- Matches played: 16
- Goals scored: 130 (8.13 per match)
- Top scorer: (United States) Austin Cuneo (17 goals)

The 2014 Pan American Youth Championship was the second edition of the Pan American Youth Championship, an international field hockey competition held from 11 – 15 February 2014 in Montevideo, Uruguay.

The tournament also served as a direct qualifier for the 2014 Summer Youth Olympics, with the winner and runner-up qualifying.

== Qualified teams ==
- Argentina
- Mexico
- United States
- Uruguay

== Results ==
=== Pool Stage ===
Pos	Team	Pld	W	D	L	GF	GA	GD	Pts	Qualification
1	Argentina	6	5	1	0	53	15	+38	16	Semi-finals
2	United States	6	4	1	1	35	17	+18	13	Semi-finals
3	Uruguay	6	2	0	4	15	21	−6	6	Semi-finals
4	Mexico	6	0	0	6	5	55	−50	0	Semi-finals

Source: FIH
Rules for classification: 1) points; 2) goal difference; 3) goals scored; 4) head-to-head result.

==== Matches ====
11 February 2014
09:15

Argentina	14–1	Mexico
Toccalino 4', 18'; Jankunas 4', 19'; Jardel 7', 22'; Dichiara 8', 23', 34'; Retegui 18', 26', 36'; Trinares 30+', 32'	Report	Oviedo 2'

Umpires:
Mary Driscoll (USA)
Denise Pelletier (CAN)

11 February 2014
10:30

United States	2–1	Uruguay
Cuneo 1', 35'	Report	Castro 7'

Umpires:
Veronica Villafañe (ARG)
Camila Cabargas (CHL)

11 February 2014
17:30

United States	6–8	Argentina
Paolino 9'; Morano 12'; Miller 16'; S. Tornetta 19'; Cuneo 27', 33'	Report	Dichiara 2', 25'; Jankunas 2'; Retegui 4', 22'; Trinchinetti 8'; Trinares 15+'; Jardel 23'

Umpires:
Natalia Lodeiro (URU)
Denise Pelletier (CAN)

11 February 2014
18:45

Mexico	0–7	Uruguay
	Report	Agazzi 1', 3', 27'; Tatton 9', 36'; Castro 15+'; Barrandeguy 18'

Umpires:
Camila Cabargas (CHL)
Veronica Villafañe (ARG)

12 February 2014
09:15

Argentina	6–1	Uruguay
Jardel 1', 12', 26'; Jankunas 6'; Retegui 20'; Ortíz 30+'	Report	Agazzi 5'

Umpires:
Mary Driscoll (USA)
Denise Pelletier (CAN)

12 February 2014
10:30

Mexico	0–9	United States
	Report	Hoffman 11'; J. Tornetta 17', 29'; Paolino 19'; Morano 22'; Cuneo 26'; S. Tornetta 30+', 36'; Miller 32'

Umpires:
Natalia Lodeiro (URU)
Camila Cabargas (CHL)

12 February 2014
17:30

Mexico	0–14	Argentina
	Report	Ortíz 1', 12', 18', 26', 35'; Trinares 5'; Toccalino 8', 14'; Trinchinetti 10', 21', 34'; Jankunas 28'; Jardel 30+', 33'

Umpires:
Natalia Lodeiro (URU)
Mary Driscoll (USA)

12 February 2014
18:45

Uruguay	1–5	United States
Agazzi 5'	Report	Fretz 3'; Cuneo 19', 20', 31'; Hoffman 34'

Umpires:
Veronica Villafañe (ARG)
Denise Pelletier (CAN)

14 February 2014
09:15

Uruguay	3–2	Mexico
Algorta 17', 29'; Agazzi 32'	Report	García 18'; Oviedo 22'

Umpires:
Mary Driscoll (USA)
Veronica Villafañe (ARG)

14 February 2014
10:30

Argentina	5–5	United States
Jardel 10'; Trinares 24'; Dichiara 26', 34'; Jankunas 33'	Report	Cuneo 10', 18'; Miller 20', 21'; Morano 35'

Umpires:
Denise Pelletier (CAN)
Camila Cabargas (CHL)

14 February 2014
17:30

United States	8–2	Mexico
Morano 7', 30+'; J. Tornetta 10'; Cuneo 19', 31', 32'; Hoffman 45'; S. Tornetta 36'	Report	Rivera 22'; Rosainz 33'

Umpires:
Natalia Lodeiro (URU)
Veronica Villafañe (ARG)

14 February 2014
18:45

Uruguay	2–6	Argentina
Tatton 2'; Castro 24'	Report	Jankunas 8'; Trinares 10'; Jardel 15+', 22'; Retegui 21', 36'

Umpires:
Mary Driscoll (USA)
Camila Cabargas (CHL)

=== Classification Stage ===
Semi-finals
15 February 2014
Argentina	12
Mexico	1
15 February 2014
United States	1
Uruguay	3

Final
15 February 2014
Argentina	4
Uruguay	0
Third place
15 February 2014
Mexico	1
United States	9

==== Semi-finals ====
15 February 2014
09:15

Argentina	12–1	Mexico
Toccalino 1', 10'; Retegui 4', 26', 33'; Jankunas 9', 14'; Jardel 11', 17', 35'; Trinchinetti 30+', 36'	Report	Lacheno 27'

Umpires:
Mary Driscoll (USA)
Natalia Lodeiro (URU)

15 February 2014
10:30

United States	1–3	Uruguay
Cuneo 31'	Report	Agazzi 7', 11'; Tatton 28'

Umpires:
Veronica Villafañe (ARG)
Denise Pelletier (CAN)

==== Third and fourth place ====
15 February 2014
17:30

Mexico	1–9	United States
Rivera 35'	Report	Hoffman 5', 10', 11'; Cuneo 7', 28', 29'; Paolino 27'; Fretz 34'; J. Tornetta 36'

Umpires:
Veronica Villafañe (ARG)
Camila Cabargas (CHL)

==== Final ====
15 February 2014
18:45

Argentina	4–0	Uruguay
Dichiara 14'; Jardel 19', 34'; Jankunas 35'	Report

Umpires:
Denise Pelletier (CAN)
Mary Driscoll (USA)

== Statistics ==
=== Final standings ===
As per statistical convention in field hockey, matches decided in extra time are counted as wins and losses, while matches decided by penalty shoot-outs are counted as draws.

Pos	Team	Pld	W	D	L	GF	GA	GD	Pts	Final standing
1st place, gold medalist(s)	Argentina	8	7	1	0	69	16	+53	22	Gold Medal
2nd place, silver medalist(s)	Uruguay	8	3	0	5	18	26	−8	9	Silver Medal
3rd place, bronze medalist(s)	United States	8	5	1	2	45	21	+24	16	Bronze Medal
4	Mexico	8	0	0	8	7	76	−69	0	Fourth place

Source: FIH

=== Goalscorers ===
There were 130 goals scored in 16 matches, for an average of 8.12 goals per match.

17 goals

- (United States) Austin Cuneo

16 goals

- (Argentina) Priscila Jardel

11 goals

- (Argentina) Micaela Retegui

10 goals

- (Argentina) Julieta Jankunas

8 goals

- (Argentina) Bárbara Dichiara
- (Uruguay) Valeria Agazzi

6 goals

- (Argentina) María Ortíz
- (Argentina) Sofía Toccalino
- (Argentina) Martina Trinares
- (Argentina) Eugenia Trinchinetti
- (United States) Ashley Hoffman

5 goals

- (United States) Madison Morano

4 goals

- (United States) Sophia Miller
- (United States) Julianna Tornetta
- (United States) Sophia Tornetta
- (Uruguay) Sophie Tatton

3 goals

- (United States) Margaux Paolino
- (Uruguay) Lucía Castro

2 goals

- (Mexico) Fernanda Oviedo
- (Mexico) Katerine Rivera
- (United States) Skyler Fretz
- (Uruguay) Milagros Algorta

1 goal

- (Mexico) Alejandra García
- (Mexico) Mayra Lacheno
- (Mexico) Arantxa Rosainz
- (Uruguay) Manuela Barrandeguy

Source: FIH
