= 2023 Argentina Women's Hockey National Tournament =

Hockey Tournament

Tournament details
- Host country: Argentina
- City: Tucumán
- Dates: 10–13 May
- Teams: 8

Final positions
- Champions: Buenos Aires
- Runner-up: (Mendoza Province) Mendoza
- Third place: (Buenos Aires Province) Bahía Blanca

Tournament statistics
- Matches played: 20
- Top scorer(s): (Buenos Aires) Guadalupe Adorno (Buenos Aires) Eugenia Trinchinetti (Mendoza Province) Sol Guignet (Córdoba Province, Argentina) Daiana Pacheco (4 goals)
- Best player: (Buenos Aires) Eugenia Trinchinetti
- Best goalkeeper: (Mendoza Province) Rocío Moretti

The 2023 Argentina Women's Hockey National Tournament was the 14th edition of the women's national tournament. It was going to be held from 10 to 13 May 2023 in Tucumán, Argentina.

Buenos Aires achieved its eleventh title after beating Mendoza 2–0 at the final.

== Squads ==
Players followed with a country flag are those involved in its senior national team.

Buenos Aires squad

Head coach: Jorge Crovetto

1. Lourdes Pérez Iturraspe (Argentina)
2. Sofía Toccalino © (Argentina)
3. Valentina Ferola
4. Inés Delpech (Argentina)
5. Sol Lombardo (Argentina)
6. Celina di Santo (Argentina)
7. Eugenia Trinchinetti (Argentina)
8. Clara Campi
9. Micaela Andrada
10. Guadalupe Adorno (Argentina)
11. Lucila Torena
12. Lucía Sanguinetti (Argentina)
14. Delfina Ortale
15. Mercedes Taboada
16. Romina Ríos
17. Alina Piccardo (Argentina)
18. Victoria Manuele (Argentina)
19. Agostina Santín
20. Sofía Cairó (Argentina)

(Buenos Aires Province) Bahía Blanca squad

Head coach: Pablo Laschiaza

1. Yazmín Pallottini
2. Marina Estevez
3. Sofía Macchia
4. Bárbara Dichiara (Argentina)
5. Florencia Scheverin ©
6. Valentina Kluin
7. Emilia Larsen
9. Luciana Argüello
10. Martina Agudiak
16. Agustina Lertora
17. Candela Esandi
14. Florencia Vallejos
15. Paz Aispuro
16. Agostina Dottori
17. Lucila Martínez Arana
22. Martina Sánchez

(Córdoba Province, Argentina) Córdoba squad

Head coach: Ignacio Bardach

1. Paula Pasquettin
2. Sofía Oliver
3. Paula Bortoletto
4. Florencia Nogueira
5. Julieta Torres
6. Juliana Ríos
7. Victoria Miranda (Argentina)
8. Lola Herrera
9. Agostina Somerfeld
10. Federica Moggia
11. Sofía Funes ©
13. Daniela Renieri
14. Paz Villegas
15. Daiana Pacheco (Argentina)
16. Mariana Peretti
17. Josefina Heredia
18. Celina Corradi
19. Delfina Tamagno

(Mendoza Province) Mendoza squad

Head coach: Walter Conna

1. Rocío Moretti
3. Julieta Guerra
4. Josefina Nardi
5. Belén Placeres
6. Paz Pringles
7. Lucía Tapia
8. Victoria Bernal
9. Delfina Thome (Argentina)
10. Amparo Correa
11. Sofía Vercelli
12. Federica Castilla
13. Manuela Quevedo
14. Julieta Medici ©
15. Malena Sabéz
16. Guadalupe Méndez
17. Emma Tarquini
18. Sol Guignet
19. Chiara Medici
20. Luciana Álvarez
21. Sol Alias

(Santa Fe Province) Rosario squad

Head coach: Emiliano Avaca

3. Victoria Oviedo
4. Josefina Tomasi
5. Valentina Gioiosa
6. Paula Mutti ©
7. Catalina Pagliaro
8. Lucila Oliveri
9. Denise Wasinski
10. Giuliana di Terlizzi
12. Sol Almirón
14. Cora Bongiorno
15. Julieta Acosta
16. Valentina Gilardoni
17. Brisa Gianetti
18. Martina Gabutti
19. Paula Mercado
20. Sofía Mazón
21. Lucía Samponi
22. Luisina Berghella
25. Pilar Larca

(Mendoza Province) San Rafael squad

Head coach: Mariano Rizzi

1. Ana Moretti
2. Juana Fernández López
3. Ethel Saromé
4. Rosario Altamiranda
5. Ana Lázaro
6. Carolina Reyes
7. Victoria Moretti
8. Natalia Ojeda
9. Lucía Ferreyra
10. Valentina Longo
11. Danisa Gil
15. Andrea Guirado
16. Luciana Ferreyra
18. Melisa Quiroga ©
19. Camila Bernaldo
20. Candela Ferreyra

(Santa Fe Province) Santa Fe squad

Head coach: Nicolás Sequeira

1. Milagros Aguirre
2. Rosario Gómez
3. Paulina Olsen
5. Florencia Juri
7. Rocío Carlen
8. Rocío Caldíz ©
9. Yoana Aguilera
10. Florencia Villar
11. Valentina Pietroni
12. Rosario Prieto
13. Camila Riedel
14. Stefanía Antoniazzi
15. Luna Morello
16. Sofía Garófalo
17. Victoria Bertone
18. Sol Villar
19. Florencia Tolosa
20. Candela Petruzzo
21. Celina Basilio
22. Leisa Tolosa

(Tucumán Province) Tucumán squad

Head coach: Alberto Darnay

1. Josefina du Plessis
3. Tania Cruz
4. Guadalupe López
5. Carla Moyano
6. Rocío Barros
7. Julieta Rodríguez
8. Sofía Curia
9. Sofía Ortega
10. Agustina Miranda
12. Sofía Díaz
14. Paula Santamarina
15. Valentina Garretón
16. Paula Gutiérrez
17. Giuliana Miranda
18. Lucía Allier ©
19. Rocío Cruz
22. Calatina Giusta
23. Luisina Migles
26. Candelaria Gravano
27. Clara Campero

== Awards ==
- Best player of the tournament: Eugenia Trinchinetti
- Best player at the final: Sofía Toccalino
- Best goalkeeper: Rocío Moretti
- Top goalscorer: Guadalupe Adorno, Sol Guignet, Daiana Pacheco and Eugenia Trinchinetti

== Final standings ==
Team	Position
Buenos Aires	1st place, gold medalist(s)
(Mendoza Province) Mendoza	2nd place, silver medalist(s)
(Buenos Aires Province) Bahía Blanca	3rd place, bronze medalist(s)
(Córdoba Province, Argentina) Córdoba	4th
(Santa Fe Province) Santa Fe	5th
(Tucumán Province) Tucumán	6th
(Santa Fe Province) Rosario	7th ▼
(Mendoza Province) San Rafael	8th ▼
