= Field hockey at the 2014 Summer Youth Olympics – Girls' tournament =

2014 Summer Youth Olympics
Tournament details
- Host country: China
- City: Nanjing
- Dates: 17–26 August
- Teams: 10
- Venue: Youth Olympic Sports Park

Final positions
- Champions: China (1st title)
- Runner-up: Netherlands
- Third place: Argentina

Tournament statistics
- Matches played: 33
- Goals scored: 313 (9.48 per match)
- Top scorer: (Argentina) Julieta Jankunas (19 goals)

The girls' tournament at the 2014 Summer Youth Olympics was held at the Youth Olympic Sports Park from 17–26 August 2014. China won the gold after defeating Netherlands in the final.

== Results ==
All times are China Standard Time (UTC+08:00)

=== Preliminary round ===
==== Pool A ====
Pos	Team	Pld	W	D	L	GF	GA	GD	Pts	Qualification
1	Netherlands	4	4	0	0	46	1	+45	12	Quarterfinals
2	Japan	4	2	1	1	42	16	+26	7	Quarterfinals
3	Argentina	4	2	1	1	34	9	+25	7	Quarterfinals
4	South Africa	4	1	0	3	8	34	−26	3	Quarterfinals
5	Fiji	4	0	0	4	3	73	−70	0	

Source: FIH
Rules for classification: 1) points; 2) goal difference; 3) goals scored; 4) head-to-head result.

17 August 2014
16:30

Argentina	22–0	Fiji
Jankunas 1', 3', 15', 15', 27', 28', 31', 34'; Trinchinetti 6', 16', 17', 36'; Ortiz 7', 33'; Retegui 10', 21', 32'; Gustavino 19', 23', 30'; Toccalino 26', 35'	Report

Umpires:
Ivona Makar (CRO)
Tanja Schafer (RSA)

17 August 2014
20:30

Japan	12–0	South Africa
Kawamura 2', 9', 9'; Mori 7', 17'; Kozuka 11', 12', 24'; Asai 24', 36'; Karino 28'; Hoshi 31'	Report

Umpires:
Liu Lijie (CHN)
Ana Escalante (MEX)

18 August 2014
16:00

Netherlands	17–0	Fiji
Veen 1'; Fortuin 2', 34'; Matla 7', 22', 27'; Wijsman 8'; Van Erk 9', 26'; Kerstholt 13', 16', 30', 34'; Fillet 19', 21', 32'; Zerbo 31'	Report

Umpires:
Liu Lijie (CHN)
Emily Carroll (AUS)

18 August 2014
19:00

Argentina	9–0	South Africa
Jankunas 3', 22'; Toccalino 4', 27'; Gustavino 8', 15'; Trinchinetti 20'; Retegui 24', 26'	Report

Umpires:
Ana Faias (POR)
Lucy Townend (NZL)

19 August 2014
16:30

Japan	1–12	Netherlands
Mori 24'	Report	Fillet 5', 8', 13'; Veen 12', 20', 21'; Matla 12', 24'; Wijsman 17', 28'; Kerstholt 23', 35'

Umpires:
Ivona Makar (CRO)
Ana Escalante (MEX)

19 August 2014
19:30

South Africa	8–2	Fiji
Harmse 1', 13'; Marais 2', 18'; Paton 11', 22'; Raubenheimer 19'; Haupt 33'	Report	Bennion 20'; Ravatu 29'

Umpires:
Lucy Townend (NZL)
Ana Faias (POR)

20 August 2014
16:00

Argentina	0–6	Netherlands
	Report	Veen 12', 26'; Van Erk 16'; Fillet 28'; Wijsman 30'; Matla 32'

Umpires:
Denise Pelletier (CAN)
Tanja Schafer (RSA)

20 August 2014
18:00

Fiji	1–26	Japan
Bennion 36'	Report	Asai 1', 7', 25', 34'; Kawamura 1', 3', 14', 15', 20', 28'; Mori 4', 11', 16', 19', 30', 31', 33'; Fujibayashi 5', 29', 32'; Kozuka 8', 10', 35', 36'; Karino 11', 18'

Umpires:
Ivona Makar (CRO)
Lucy Townend (NZL)

21 August 2014
18:00

Netherlands	11–0	South Africa
Veen 8', 35'; Zerbo 9', 10'; Kerstholt 12', 26', 28', 35'; Van Erk 17'; Fortuin 22'; Wijsman 25'	Report

Umpires:
Emily Carroll (AUS)
Ana Escalante (MEX)

21 August 2014
21:00

Japan	3–3	Argentina
Tsubouchi 7'; Asai 17', 36'	Report	Jankunas 2'; Retegui 21', 27'

Umpires:
Ana Faias (POR)
Tanja Schafer (RSA)

==== Pool B ====
Pos	Team	Pld	W	D	L	GF	GA	GD	Pts	Qualification
1	China	4	4	0	0	29	3	+26	12	Quarterfinals
2	Uruguay	4	3	0	1	19	8	+11	9	Quarterfinals
3	New Zealand	4	2	0	2	20	20	0	6	Quarterfinals
4	Germany	4	1	0	3	8	23	−15	3	Quarterfinals
5	Zambia	4	0	0	4	8	30	−22	0	

Source: FIH
Rules for classification: 1) points; 2) goal difference; 3) goals scored; 4) head-to-head result.

17 August 2014
17:30

China	8–0	Zambia
Zhang X. 4', 16', 25'; Zhang J. 18'; Tu 32'; Chen 34'; Zhang L. 35'; Zhong 36'	Report

Umpires:
Toh Li Min (SIN)
Lucy Townend (NZL)

17 August 2014
19:30

Germany	2–6	Uruguay
Angerer 2'; Bittel 29'	Report	Saenz 9'; Casarotti 11', 28'; Galeano 13'; Barrandeguy 31'; Algorta 34'

Umpires:
Ana Faias (POR)
Denise Pelletier (CAN)

18 August 2014
18:00

New Zealand	10–5	Zambia
Tinning 5', 17'; Kwek 9', 24'; Hyatt Brown 11', 34'; Waddell 22'; White 24'; Davies 28'; Kiddle 36'	Report	Kalomo 15', 16', 21'; Nakombe 20'; Mudenda 32'

Umpires:
Denise Pelletier (CAN)
Ivona Makar (CRO)

18 August 2014
20:30

China	2–0	Uruguay
Zhang J. 10', 24'	Report

Umpires:
Tanja Schafer (RSA)
Ana Escalante (MEX)

19 August 2014
17:30

Germany	1–4	New Zealand
Angerer 20'	Report	Hyatt Brown 11', 14'; Tinning 26'; Robinson 28'

Umpires:
Toh Li Min (SIN)
Tanja Schafer (RSA)

19 August 2014
20:30

Uruguay	7–1	Zambia
Gaminara 5', 20', 30'; Saenz 13', 18', 27', 32'	Report	Mudenda 31'

Umpires:
Emily Carroll (AUS)
Denise Pelletier (CAN)

20 August 2014
19:00

China	8–3	New Zealand
Zhang J. 16', 27'; Zhang L. 17', 29'; Zhang X. 18'; Chen 20'; Li 23', 36'	Report	Hyatt Brown 5'; Tinning 14'; Kwek 22'

Umpires:
Ana Faias (POR)
Emily Carroll (AUS)

20 August 2014
21:00

Zambia	2–5	Germany
Kalomo 2'; Mambwe 33'	Report	Angerer 9'; Hohenhovel 14'; Jeltsch 29'; Baumgarten 31'; Scheidl 34'

Umpires:
Liu Lijie (CHN)
Toh Li Min (SIN)

21 August 2014
17:30

New Zealand	3–6	Uruguay
Kwek 12'; Davies 32'; Kiddle 34'	Report	Gaminara 1', 10'; Barrandeguy 2', 22'; Galeano 6'; Saenz 27'

Umpires:
Toh Li Min (SIN)
Ivona Makar (CRO)

21 August 2014
20:30

Germany	0–11	China
	Report	Zhang J. 3', 4', 11', 29'; Tu 8', 10'; Zhong 9'; Li 11', 31'; Chen 15'; Zhang X. 28'

Umpires:
Denise Pelletier (CAN)
Lucy Townend (NZL)

=== Classification match ===
==== Ninth and tenth place ====
24 August 2014
16:00

Fiji	1–6	Zambia
Dutta 22'	Report	Mudenda 7', 29', 32'; Mambwe 9'; Phiri 27'; Nankala 34'

Umpires:
Emily Carroll (AUS)
Toh Li Min (SIN)

=== Medal round ===
Quarterfinals
23 August 2014
Netherlands	8
Germany	1
23 August 2014
Uruguay	0
Argentina	9
23 August 2014
China	7
South Africa	1
23 August 2014
Japan	7
New Zealand	1

Semi-finals
24 August 2014
Netherlands	4
Argentina	2
24 August 2014
China	4
Japan	3

Gold-medal match
26 August 2014
Netherlands	5 (2)
China (p.s.o.)	5 (3)
Bronze-medal match
26 August 2014
Argentina	5
Japan	2

==== Quarterfinals ====
23 August 2014
16:00

Netherlands	8–1	Germany
Matla 11', 20'; Veen 13', 30'; Kerstholt 18', 27'; Fillet 29', 35'	Report	Hohenhovel 1'

Umpires:
Liu Lijie (CHN)
Tanja Schafer (RSA)

23 August 2014
16:30

Uruguay	0–9	Argentina
	Report	Ortiz 2'; Jankunas 3', 28', 34'; Gustavino 6'; Dichiara 8'; Toccalino 29'; Trinchinetti 31', 33'

Umpires:
Ivona Makar (CRO)
Ana Escalante (MEX)

23 August 2014
17:30

China	7–1	South Africa
Zhang L. 1', 3'; Zhang X. 2', 13', 24'; Li 18'; Chen 20'	Report	Esteves 6'

Umpires:
Denise Pelletier (CAN)
Toh Li Min (SIN)

23 August 2014
18:00

Japan	7–1	New Zealand
Kozuka 2', 22', 36'; Mori 6', 20'; Tsubouchi 8'; Kawamura 31'	Report	Waddell 23'

Umpires:
Ana Faias (POR)
Emily Carroll (AUS)

==== Fifth to eighth place classification ====
Crossover
24 August 2014
Germany	0
Uruguay	2
24 August 2014
South Africa	3
New Zealand	4

Fifth-place match
26 August 2014
Uruguay	4
New Zealand	5
Seventh-place match
26 August 2014
Germany	6
South Africa	1

==== Crossover ====
24 August 2014
16:30

Germany	0–2	Uruguay
	Report	Gaminara 1'; Barrandeguy 13'

Umpires:
Denise Pelletier (CAN)
Lucy Townend (NZL)

24 August 2014
17:30

South Africa	3–4	New Zealand
Esteves 26', 36'; Haupt 27'	Report	Hyatt Brown 4'; Robinson 6'; Waddell 18'; Davies 25'

Umpires:
Liu Lijie (CHN)
Ana Escalante (MEX)

==== Seventh and eighth place ====
26 August 2014
16:00

Germany	6–1	South Africa
Scheidl 5'; Angerer 12', 14'; Jeltsch 18', 30'; Hohenhovel 24'	Report	Marais 9'

Umpires:
Lucy Townend (NZL)
Ana Escalante (MEX)

==== Fifth and sixth place ====
26 August 2014
17:30

Uruguay	4–5	New Zealand
Gaminara 5', 27', 33'; Galeano 33'		Hyatt Brown 8'; Waddell 14', 34'; White 28'; Robinson 30'

Umpires:
Toh Li Min (SIN)
Liu Lijie (CHN)

==== Semi-finals ====
24 August 2014
18:00

Netherlands	4–2	Argentina
Kerstholt 20', 35'; Van Erk 22'; Veen 34'	Report	Jankunas 11', 31'

Umpires:
Tanja Schafer (RSA)
Ivona Makar (CRO)

24 August 2014
19:30

China	4–3	Japan
Zhang L. 4'; Zhang X. 10'; Zhang J. 13', 19'	Report	Asai 1'; Mori 5', 12'

Umpires:
Emily Carroll (AUS)
Ana Faias (POR)

==== Bronze-medal match ====
26 August 2014
19:00

(bronze) Argentina	5–2	Japan
Ortiz 13'; Guastavino 17'; Jankunas 20', 25', 35'	Report	Fujibayashi 27'; Mori 32'

Umpires:
Denise Pelletier (CAN)
Ivona Makar (CRO)

==== Gold-medal match ====
26 August 2014
20:30

(silver) Netherlands	5–5	China (gold)
Zerbo 20'; Kerstholt 22'; Van Erk 25'; Veen 26'; Matla 28'	Report	Zhang J. 2', 16'; Zhang L. 4'; Tu 8'; Zhang X. 29'
Penalties
Matla (penalty shoot-out scored); Wijsman (penalty shoot-out missed); Veen (penalty shoot-out scored)	2–3	(penalty shoot-out scored) Zhang L. (penalty shoot-out scored) Li; (penalty shoot-out scored) Zhang J.

Umpires:
Ana Faias (POR)
Tanja Schafer (RSA)

== Goalscorers ==
There have been 296 goals scored in 33 matches, for an average of 8.97 goals per match.

19 goals

- (Argentina) Julieta Jankunas

15 goals

- (Netherlands) Maxime Kerstholt

12 goals

- (Japan) Kanon Mori
- (Netherlands) Marijn Veen

11 goals

- (Japan) Miki Kozuka
- (Uruguay) Cecilia Casarotti

10 goals

- (China) Zhang Jinrong
- (China) Zhang Xindan
- (Japan) Motomi Kawamura

9 goals

- (Netherlands) Michelle Fillet

8 goals

- (Japan) Yu Asai

7 goals

- (Netherlands) Frédérique Matla
- (Argentina) Micaela Retegui
- (Argentina) Delfina Thome Gustavino
- (Argentina) Eugenia Trinchinetti
- (China) Zhang Lijia

6 goals

- (New Zealand) Ella Hyatt Brown
- (Netherlands) Elin van Erk
- (Uruguay) Lucia Castro

5 goals

- (Argentina) Sofia Toccalino
- (Netherlands) Carmen Wijsman
- (New Zealand) Casey-Mae Waddell
- (Zambia) Loveness Mudenda

4 goals

- (Germany) Kyra Angerer
- (China) Li Hong
- (China) Tu Yidan
- (Japan) Chiko Fujibayashi
- (Zambia) Catherine Kalomo
- (Argentina) Maria Ortiz
- (Netherlands) Ginella Zerbo

3 goals

- (China) Chen Yang
- (Uruguay) Constanza Barrandeguy
- (Uruguay) Valeria Agazzi
- (Germany) Luisa Hohenhovel
- (Germany) Anna Jeltsch
- (Japan) Mami Karino
- (Netherlands) Kyra Fortuin
- (New Zealand) Catherine Tinning
- (New Zealand) Frances Davies
- (New Zealand) Amy Robinson
- (South Africa) Natalie Esteves
- (South Africa) Marizen Marais

2 goals

- (China) Zhong Jiaqi
- (Fiji) Taraivini Bennion
- (Germany) Thea Scheidl
- (New Zealand) Su Kwek
- (New Zealand) Bridget Kiddle
- (New Zealand) Tayla White
- (South Africa) Demi Harmse
- (South Africa) Chrissie Haupt
- (South Africa) Kristen Paton
- (Zambia) Eniless Mambwe

1 goal

- (Argentina) Bárbara Dichiara
- (Fiji) Tiara Dutta
- (Fiji) Lala Ravatu
- (Japan) Kimika Hoshi
- (Japan) Moeka Tsubouchi
- (Germany) Alena Baumgarten
- (Germany) Lara Bittel
- (South Africa) Cheneal Raubenheimer
- (Uruguay) Milagros Algorta
- (Zambia) Carol Nakombe
- (Zambia) Martha Nankala
- (Zambia) Comfort Phiri

Source: FIH
