= 2021–22 Women's FIH Pro League =

- Dates: 13 October 2021 – 26 June 2022
- Teams: 9 (from 3 confederations)

Final positions
- Champions: Argentina (1st title)
- Runner-up: Netherlands
- Third place: India

Tournament statistics
- Matches played: 70
- Goals scored: 264 (3.77 per match)
- Top scorer: (Argentina) Agustina Gorzelany (12 goals)

The 2021–22 Women's FIH Pro League was the third edition of the Women's FIH Pro League, a field hockey championship for women's national teams. The tournament started in October 2021 and finished in June 2022.

== Format ==
The home and away principle was kept but this principle was split over two consecutive seasons onwards and worked according to the following example:

- in previous season 2020–21, Team A hosted Team B twice within a couple of days.
- in current season 2021–22, Team B hosted Team A twice within a couple of days.

If one of the two matches played between two teams was cancelled, the winner of the other match would have received double points.

== Teams ==
Originally, nine teams were scheduled to compete in a round-robin tournament, being played from October 2021 to June 2022. On 17 September 2021, both, New Zealand and Australia, withdrew due to the COVID-19 pandemic and the travel restrictions coming with it. On 8 October 2021, the FIH announced that India and Spain were the replacements.

- Argentina
- ~~Australia~~
- Belgium
- China
- England
- Germany
- India
- Netherlands
- ~~New Zealand~~
- Spain
- United States

== Results ==
=== Standings ===
| Pos | Team | Pld | W | SOW | SOL | L | GF | GA | GD | Pts |
|---|---|---|---|---|---|---|---|---|---|---|
| 1st place, gold medalist(s) | Argentina (C) | 16 | 13 | 0 | 3 | 0 | 43 | 18 | +25 | 42 |
| 2nd place, silver medalist(s) | Netherlands | 16 | 10 | 4 | 0 | 2 | 42 | 16 | +26 | 38 |
| 3rd place, bronze medalist(s) | India (Note: The India versus England matches were cancelled and counted as wins for India.) | 14 | 6 | 2 | 2 | 4 | 33 | 26 | +7 | 30 |
| 4 | Belgium | 16 | 9 | 0 | 1 | 6 | 35 | 20 | +15 | 28 |
| 5 | Spain | 16 | 5 | 2 | 2 | 7 | 23 | 26 | −3 | 21 |
| 6 | Germany | 16 | 5 | 1 | 2 | 8 | 30 | 27 | +3 | 19 |
| 7 | England | 14 | 5 | 1 | 1 | 7 | 26 | 35 | −9 | 18 |
| 8 | China | 16 | 3 | 3 | 0 | 10 | 19 | 42 | −23 | 15 |
| 9 | United States | 16 | 1 | 0 | 2 | 13 | 13 | 54 | −41 | 5 |

Source: FIH
Rules for classification: 1) points; 2) matches won; 3) goal difference; 4) goals for; 5) head-to-head result; 6) field goals scored.
(C) Champion

=== Fixtures ===
All times are local.

13 October 2021
18:00

| Netherlands | 2–0 | Belgium |
|---|---|---|
| Welten 1'; Moes 52' | Report |

Wagener Stadium, Amstelveen
Umpires:
Céline Martin-Schmets (BEL)
Hannah Harrison (ENG)

16 October 2021
14:00

| Belgium | 1–0 | Germany |
|---|---|---|
| Ballenghien 53' | Report |

Royal Uccle Sport, Brussels
Umpires:
Alison Keogh (IRL)
Hannah Harrison (ENG)

17 October 2021
14:00

| Belgium | 3–1 | Germany |
|---|---|---|
| Vanden Borre 10', 21'; De Mot 59' | Report | Kurz 40' |

Royal Uccle Sport, Brussels
Umpires:
Hannah Harrison (ENG)
Alison Keogh (IRL)

10 November 2021
18:00

| Netherlands | 3–1 | Belgium |
|---|---|---|
| Burg 33'; Moes 36'; Welten 38' | Report | Vanden Borre 16' |

Wagener Stadium, Amstelveen
Umpires:
Laurine Delforge (BEL)
Coen van Bunge (NED)

31 January 2022
15:00

| China | 1–7 | India |
|---|---|---|
| Deng 43' | Report | Navneet 5'; Neha 12'; Vandana 40'; Sushila 47', 52'; Sharmila 48'; Gurjit 50' |

Sultan Qaboos Sports Complex, Muscat, Oman
Umpires:
Kang Hyun-young (KOR)
Cookie Tan (SGP)

1 February 2022
15:00

| China | 1–2 | India |
|---|---|---|
| Wang S. 39' | Report | Gurjit 3', 49' |

Sultan Qaboos Sports Complex, Muscat, Oman
Umpires:
Junko Wagatsuma (JPN)
Kang Hyun-young (KOR)

4 February 2022
13:30

| Netherlands | 1–0 | Spain |
|---|---|---|
| Matla 41' | Report |

Estadio Betero, Valencia, Spain
Umpires:
Ivona Makar (CRO)
Michelle Meister (GER)

5 February 2022
16:30

| Netherlands | 2–2 | Spain |
|---|---|---|
| Jansen 12', 25' | Report | Álvarez 21'; Giné 36' |
Penalties
| Sanders (penalty shoot-out scored); Jansen (penalty shoot-out scored); De Waard (penalty shoot-out missed); Verschoor (penalty shoot-out scored); Welten (penalty shoot-out missed) | 3–2 | (penalty shoot-out scored) Iglesias; (penalty shoot-out missed) Strappato; (penalty shoot-out missed) Giné; (penalty shoot-out scored) L. Barrios; (penalty shoot-out missed) Segú |

Estadio Betero, Valencia, Spain
Umpires:
Ivona Makar (CRO)
Bruce Bale (ENG)

12 February 2022
16:30

| Argentina | 3–1 | Belgium |
|---|---|---|
| Trinchinetti 10', 58'; M. Granatto 55' | Report | Gerniers 12' |

CeNARD, Buenos Aires
Umpires:
Irene Presenqui (ARG)
Catalina Montesino (CHI)

13 February 2022
16:30

| Argentina | 3–1 | Belgium |
|---|---|---|
| Gorzelany 37', 43', 59' | Report | Breyne 11' |

CeNARD, Buenos Aires
Umpires:
Catalina Montesino (CHI)
Irene Presenqui (ARG)

19 February 2022
19:00

| Argentina | 5–2 | England |
|---|---|---|
| Gorzelany 5', 39'; Jankunas 13', 55'; Thome 37' | Report | Pearne-Webb 23'; Rayer 38' |

CeNARD, Buenos Aires
Umpires:
Catalina Montesino (CHI)
Irene Presenqui (ARG)

20 February 2022
19:00

| Argentina | 5–2 | England |
|---|---|---|
| M. Granatto 5'; Triñanes 26'; Trinchinetti 28'; V. Granatto 35'; Albertarrio 49' | Report | Rayer 48'; Hunt 52' |

CeNARD, Buenos Aires
Umpires:
Catalina Montesino (CHI)
Irene Presenqui (ARG)

26 February 2022
17:00

| India | 2–1 | Spain |
|---|---|---|
| Jyoti 20'; Neha 52' | Report | Segú 18' |

Kalinga Stadium, Bhubaneswar
Umpires:
Céline Martin-Schmets (BEL)
Deepak Joshi (IND)

27 February 2022
17:00

| India | 3–4 | Spain |
|---|---|---|
| Sangita 10'; Salima 22'; Namita 49' | Report | B. García 4'; M. García 15'; Iglesias 24'; Giné 60' |

Kalinga Stadium, Bhubaneswar
Umpires:
Raghu Prasad (IND)
Céline Martin-Schmets (BEL)

12 March 2022
17:00

| India | 1–1 | Germany |
|---|---|---|
| Navneet 4' | Report | Sippel 5' |
Penalties
| Sharmila (penalty shoot-out missed); Navneet (penalty shoot-out scored); Neha (penalty shoot-out missed); Lalremsiami (penalty shoot-out missed); Monika (penalty shoot-out missed) | 1–2 | (penalty shoot-out missed) Fleschütz; (penalty shoot-out scored) Heinz; (penalty shoot-out scored) Strauss; (penalty shoot-out missed) Wiedermann; (penalty shoot-out missed) Nolte |

Kalinga Stadium, Bhubaneswar
Umpires:
Céline Martin-Schmets (BEL)
Javed Shaikh (IND)

13 March 2022
17:00

| India | 1–1 | Germany |
|---|---|---|
| Nisha 40' | Report | Wiedermann 29' |
Penalties
| Salima (penalty shoot-out scored); Sangita (penalty shoot-out scored); Sonika (penalty shoot-out scored) | 3–0 | (penalty shoot-out missed) Stoffelsma; (penalty shoot-out missed) Frerichs; (penalty shoot-out missed) Strauss |

Kalinga Stadium, Bhubaneswar
Umpires:
Céline Martin-Schmets (BEL)
Raghu Prasad (IND)

22 March 2022
15:30

| Germany | 2–2 | Spain |
|---|---|---|
| Maertens 14'; Zimmermann 56' | Report | L. Barrios 38'; Segú 58' |
Penalties
| Schröder (penalty shoot-out missed); Zimmermann (penalty shoot-out missed); Schwabe (penalty shoot-out missed) | 0–3 | (penalty shoot-out scored) Giné; (penalty shoot-out scored) Jiménez; (penalty shoot-out scored) L. Barrios |

Deutscher Sportklub, Düsseldorf
Umpires:
Alison Keogh (IRL)
Céline Martin-Schmets (BEL)

23 March 2022
15:30

| Germany | 3–0 | Spain |
|---|---|---|
| Maertens 12', 43'; Micheel 36' | Report |

Deutscher Sportklub, Düsseldorf
Umpires:
Ben Göntgen (GER)
Alison Keogh (IRL)

26 March 2022
14:00

| Germany | 2–0 | United States |
|---|---|---|
| Granitzki 35'; Zimmermann 45' | Report |

Warsteiner HockeyPark, Mönchengladbach
Umpires:
Alison Keogh (IRL)
Sarah Wilson (SCO)

27 March 2022
12:00

| Germany | 4–0 | United States |
|---|---|---|
| Micheel 22'; Zimmermann 47'; Gerstenhöfer 50'; Gräve 52' | Report |

Warsteiner HockeyPark, Mönchengladbach
Umpires:
Michiel Otten (NED)
Alison Keogh (IRL)

2 April 2022
18:00

| Netherlands | 3–0 | United States |
|---|---|---|
| Moes 18'; Morgenstern 25', 40' | Report |

Wagener Stadium, Amstelveen
Umpires:
Hannah Harrison (ENG)
Bruce Bale (ENG)

3 April 2022
16:30

| Netherlands | 10–0 | United States |
|---|---|---|
| Jansen 9', 23', 59'; Van Laarhoven 19'; Matla 37', 43'; Burg 42', 57'; Welten 51'; Moes 53' | Report |

Wagener Stadium, Amstelveen
Umpires:
Sarah Wilson (SCO)
Hannah Harrison (ENG)

8 April 2022 (Note: The matches, originally scheduled for 19 and 20 February 2022, were postponed by the request of the Dutch team.)
19:30

| India | 2–1 | Netherlands |
|---|---|---|
| Neha 11'; Sonika 28' | Report | Jansen 40' |

Kalinga Stadium, Bhubaneswar
Umpires:
Deepak Joshi (IND)
Raghu Prasad (IND)

9 April 2022
15:30

| India | 1–1 | Netherlands |
|---|---|---|
| Rajwinder 1' | Report | Jansen 54' |
Penalties
| Jyoti (penalty shoot-out missed); Neha (penalty shoot-out missed); Navneet (penalty shoot-out scored); Rajwinder (penalty shoot-out missed) | 1–3 | (penalty shoot-out scored) Jansen; (penalty shoot-out scored) Fortuin; (penalty shoot-out missed) Morgenstern; (penalty shoot-out scored) Barentsen |

Kalinga Stadium, Bhubaneswar
Umpires:
Javed Shaikh (IND)
Deepak Joshi (IND)

16 April 2022
16:00

| Argentina | 3–1 | United States |
|---|---|---|
| Costa 34', 60'; Sánchez Moccia 35' | Report | Grega 30' |

CeNARD, Buenos Aires
Umpires:
Suzi Sutton (USA)
Maggie Giddens (USA)

17 April 2022
16:00

| Argentina | 3–0 | United States |
|---|---|---|
| V. Granatto 18', 34'; Sánchez Moccia 46' | Report |

CeNARD, Buenos Aires
Umpires:
Suzi Sutton (USA)
Germán Montes De Oca (ARG)

23 April 2022
14:00

| United States | 1–3 | England |
|---|---|---|
| Matson 59' | Report | Pearne-Webb 35'; Rayer 41'; Balsdon 54' |

Karen Shelton Stadium, Chapel Hill
Umpires:
Tyler Klenk (CAN)
Suzi Sutton (USA)

24 April 2022
14:00

| United States | 2–2 | England |
|---|---|---|
| Rodgers 11'; Grega 20' | Report | Lock 48'; S. Hamilton 58' |
Penalties
| Moyer (penalty shoot-out missed); Sessa (penalty shoot-out missed); Matson (penalty shoot-out scored); Yeager (penalty shoot-out missed) | 1–3 | (penalty shoot-out scored) Hamilton; (penalty shoot-out missed) Bourne; (penalty shoot-out scored) Petter; (penalty shoot-out missed) Pearne-Webb; (penalty shoot-out scored) Rayer |

Karen Shelton Stadium, Chapel Hill
Umpires:
Suzi Sutton (USA)
Maggie Giddens (USA)

4 May 2022
15:00

| Germany | 3–4 | England |
|---|---|---|
| Gablać 25'; Lorenz 29'; Zimmermann 52' | Report | Balsdon 25'; Bourne 33', 57'; Howard 47' |

Warsteiner HockeyPark, Mönchengladbach
Umpires:
Céline Martin-Schmets (BEL)
Sarah Wilson (SCO)

5 May 2022
13:00

| Germany | 4–1 | England |
|---|---|---|
| Stapenhorst 2'; Lorenz 6'; Gablać 55'; Maertens 58' | Report | Martin 50' |

Warsteiner HockeyPark, Mönchengladbach
Umpires:
Céline Martin-Schmets (BEL)
Sarah Wilson (SCO)

14 May 2022
13:00

| Spain | 0–1 | Argentina |
|---|---|---|
| | Report | V. Granatto 4' |

Estadio Betero, Valencia
Umpires:
Laurine Delforge (BEL)
Steve Rogres (AUS)

15 May 2022
13:00

| Spain | 0–1 | Argentina |
|---|---|---|
| | Report | Albertarrio 31' |

Estadio Betero, Valencia
Umpires:
Liu Xiaoying (CHN)
Steve Rogres (AUS)

17 May 2022
13:30

| China | 1–3 | Argentina |
|---|---|---|
| Chen L. 57' | Report | Gorzelany 21'; Albertarrio 43'; V. Granatto 51' |

Estadio Betero, Valencia
Umpires:
Laurine Delforge (BEL)
Liu Xiaoying (CHN)

18 May 2022
13:30

| China | 1–3 | Argentina |
|---|---|---|
| Gu B. 19' | Report | Jankunas 36'; Gorzelany 52'; Trinchinetti 57' |

Estadio Betero, Valencia
Umpires:
Ben Göntgen (GER)
Laurine Delforge (BEL)

20 May 2022
18:00

| Belgium | 1–2 | Spain |
|---|---|---|
| Ballenghien 5' | Report | L. Barrios 43'; Oliva 52' |

Wilrijkse Plein Antwerp, Antwerp
Umpires:
Sarah Wilson (SCO)
Ivona Makar (CRO)

21 May 2022
13:30

| Germany | 1–2 | Argentina |
|---|---|---|
| Huse 41' | Report | Trinchinetti 22'; Gorzelany 51' |

Ernst Reuter Sportfeld, Berlin
Umpires:
Hannah Harrison (ENG)
Alison Keogh (IRL)

21 May 2022
15:30

| England | 1–1 | China |
|---|---|---|
| Howard 39' | Report | Gu B. 60+' |
Penalties
| Howard (penalty shoot-out scored); Martin (penalty shoot-out missed); Owsley (penalty shoot-out scored); Peel (penalty shoot-out scored); Balsdon (penalty shoot-out missed) | 3–4 | (penalty shoot-out scored) Luo; (penalty shoot-out scored) Li H. (penalty shoot-out scored) Zhang X. (penalty shoot-out scored) Zhong |

Lee Valley Hockey and Tennis Centre, London
Umpires:
Michelle Meister (GER)
Liu Xiaoying (CHN)

21 May 2022
18:00

| Belgium | 3–0 | Spain |
|---|---|---|
| Marien 20'; Ballenghien 27'; Raye 56' | Report |

Wilrijkse Plein Antwerp, Antwerp
Umpires:
Sarah Wilson (SCO)
Ivona Makar (CRO)

22 May 2022
11:30

| Germany | 1–3 | Argentina |
|---|---|---|
| Lorenz 26' | Report | M. Granatto 1', 33'; Cedrés 11' |

Ernst Reuter Sportfeld, Berlin
Umpires:
Hannah Harrison (ENG)
Alison Keogh (IRL)

22 May 2022
14:30

| England | 1–3 | China |
|---|---|---|
| Balsdon 11' | Report | Gu B. 23'; Zhang Xin. 32'; Chen Y. 57' |

Lee Valley Hockey and Tennis Centre, London
Umpires:
Michelle Meister (GER)
Liu Xiaoying (CHN)

28 May 2022
13:00

| Netherlands | 1–1 | Argentina |
|---|---|---|
| Matla 29' | Report | M. Granatto 58' |
Penalties
| Matla (penalty shoot-out scored); Jansen (penalty shoot-out scored); Fortuin (penalty shoot-out scored); De Waard (penalty shoot-out scored) | 4–2 | (penalty shoot-out missed) V. Granatto; (penalty shoot-out scored) Albertario; (penalty shoot-out missed) Thome; (penalty shoot-out scored) Gorzelany |

R.K.H.V. Union, Nijmegen
Umpires:
Ivona Makar (CRO)
Michelle Meister (GER)

28 May 2022
14:30

| England | 3–1 | Spain |
|---|---|---|
| Ansley 22'; Owsley 28'; Balsdon 46' | Report | Giné 41' |

Lee Valley Hockey and Tennis Centre, London
Umpires:
Laurine Delforge (BEL)
Sarah Wilson (SCO)

29 May 2022
13:00

| Netherlands | 1–1 | Argentina |
|---|---|---|
| Jansen 37' | Report | M. Granatto 43' |
Penalties
| Sanders (penalty shoot-out scored); Matla (penalty shoot-out missed); Fortuin (penalty shoot-out missed); Jansen (penalty shoot-out scored); De Waard (penalty shoot-out missed); Sanders (penalty shoot-out scored) | 3–2 | (penalty shoot-out missed) Sánchez Moccia; (penalty shoot-out scored) Albertario; (penalty shoot-out missed) Toccalino; (penalty shoot-out scored) Cedrés; (penalty shoot-out missed) V. Granatto; (penalty shoot-out missed) Albertario |

R.K.H.V. Union, Nijmegen
Umpires:
Céline Martin-Schmets (BEL)
Ivona Makar (CRO)

29 May 2022
14:30

| England | 0–2 | Spain |
|---|---|---|
| | Report | Giné 20'; Segú 60' |

Lee Valley Hockey and Tennis Centre, London
Umpires:
Laurine Delforge (BEL)
Sarah Wilson (SCO)

4 June 2022
14:00

| England | 3–1 | Netherlands |
|---|---|---|
| Toman 20'; Petter 42'; Balsdon 52' | Report | Kerstholt 49' |

Lee Valley Hockey and Tennis Centre, London
Umpires:
Alison Keogh (IRL)
Sarah Wilson (SCO)

4 June 2022
21:30

| Spain | 1–1 | China |
|---|---|---|
| F. Amundson 8' | Report | Gu B. 2' |
Penalties
| Iglesias (penalty shoot-out missed); Strappato (penalty shoot-out missed); López García (penalty shoot-out scored); Segú (penalty shoot-out missed); Jiménez Vicente (penalty shoot-out scored); Jiménez Vicente (penalty shoot-out scored); López García (penalty shoot-out missed) | 3–4 | (penalty shoot-out missed) Li H. (penalty shoot-out missed) Zhang Xia. (penalty shoot-out scored) Luo; (penalty shoot-out missed) Wang; (penalty shoot-out scored) Zhu; (penalty shoot-out scored) Luo; (penalty shoot-out scored) Li J. |

Estadi Olímpic de Terrassa, Terrassa
Umpires:
Hannah Harrison (ENG)
Michelle Meister (GER)

5 June 2022
13:00

| England | 1–2 | Netherlands |
|---|---|---|
| Rayer 10' | Report | Van den Assem 39'; Clasener 42' |

Lee Valley Hockey and Tennis Centre, London
Umpires:
Alison Keogh (IRL)
Sarah Wilson (SCO)

5 June 2022
21:30

| Spain | 4–0 | China |
|---|---|---|
| Giné 7', 37'; García 15'; Oliva 59' | Report |

Estadi Olímpic de Terrassa, Terrassa
Umpires:
Hannah Harrison (ENG)
Michelle Meister (GER)

7 June 2022
20:30

| Belgium | 3–1 | China |
|---|---|---|
| Englebert 11' 'T Serstevens 14'; Struijk 31' | Report | Zhang Y. 53' |

Wilrijkse Plein Antwerp, Antwerp
Umpires:
Liu Xiaoying (CHN)
Céline Martin-Schmets (BEL)

8 June 2022
20:30

| Belgium | 1–1 | China |
|---|---|---|
| De Mot 45' | Report | Gu B. 23' |
Penalties
| Versavel (penalty shoot-out missed); De Mot (penalty shoot-out missed); Ballenghien (penalty shoot-out missed); Breyne (penalty shoot-out missed) | 0–2 | (penalty shoot-out scored) Luo; (penalty shoot-out missed) Li H. (penalty shoot-out missed) Chen Ya. (penalty shoot-out scored) Zhang Xia. |

Wilrijkse Plein Antwerp, Antwerp
Umpires:
Liu Xiaoying (CHN)
Céline Martin-Schmets (BEL)

11 June 2022
11:00

| Spain | 1–1 | United States |
|---|---|---|
| Oliva 29' | Report | Marshall 27' |
Penalties
| Jiménez Vicente (penalty shoot-out missed); Giné (penalty shoot-out scored); L. Barrios (penalty shoot-out scored); Iglesias (penalty shoot-out scored); F. Amundson (penalty shoot-out scored) | 4–2 | (penalty shoot-out scored) Caarls; (penalty shoot-out missed) Matson; (penalty shoot-out scored) Moyer; (penalty shoot-out missed) Grega |

Wilrijkse Plein Antwerp, Antwerp, Belgium
Umpires:
Michelle Meister (GER)
Laurine Delforge (BEL)

11 June 2022
13:30

| Germany | 2–3 | Netherlands |
|---|---|---|
| Strauss 7'; Zimmermann 22' | Report | Albers 33'; Welten 42'; Sanders 55' |

Der Club an der Alster, Hamburg
Umpires:
Ivona Makar (CRO)
Céline Martin-Schmets (BEL)

11 June 2022
14:00

| Belgium | 2–1 | India |
|---|---|---|
| Nelen 3'; Ballenghien 35' | Report | Lalremsiami 48' |

Wilrijkse Plein Antwerp, Antwerp
Umpires:
Liu Xiaoying (CHN)
Hannah Harrison (ENG)

12 June 2022
11:00

| Spain | 3–2 | United States |
|---|---|---|
| S. Barrios 36'; García Grau 57', 58' | Report | Matson 29'; Hoffman 54' |

Wilrijkse Plein Antwerp, Antwerp, Belgium
Umpires:
Laurine Delforge (BEL)
Liu Xiaoying (CHN)

12 June 2022
11:30

| Germany | 1–3 | Netherlands |
|---|---|---|
| Zimmermann 35' | Report | Moes 10'; De Waard 22'; Jansen 42' |

Der Club an der Alster, Hamburg
Umpires:
Ivona Makar (CRO)
Céline Martin-Schmets (BEL)

12 June 2022
14:00

| Belgium | 5–0 | India |
|---|---|---|
| Nelen 2'; Englebert 4'; Raye 19'; Vanden Borre 23'; Ballenghien 36' | Report |

Wilrijkse Plein Antwerp, Antwerp
Umpires:
Hannah Harrison (ENG)
Michelle Meister (GER)

18 June 2022
11:30

| China | 3–2 | United States |
|---|---|---|
| Li H. 21'; Yuan 22', 50' | Report | Crouse 51'; Rodgers 57' |

Hazelaarweg Stadion, Rotterdam, Netherlands
Umpires:
Laurine Delforge (BEL)
Ivona Makar (CRO)

18 June 2022
14:00

| India | 3–3 | Argentina |
|---|---|---|
| Lalremsiami 4'; Gurjit 37', 51' | Report | Gorzelany 22', 37', 45' |
Penalties
| Sharmila (penalty shoot-out missed); Neha (penalty shoot-out scored); Monika (penalty shoot-out missed); Sonika (penalty shoot-out scored) | 2–1 | (penalty shoot-out missed) Jankunas; (penalty shoot-out missed) M. Granatto; (penalty shoot-out missed) Sánchez Moccia; (penalty shoot-out scored) V. Granatto; (penalty shoot-out missed) Albertario |

Hazelaarweg Stadion, Rotterdam, Netherlands
Umpires:
Liu Xiaoying (CHN)
Céline Martin-Schmets (BEL)

18 June 2022
14:00

| England | 2–1 | Belgium |
|---|---|---|
| Howard 42'; Balsdon 51' | Report | Struijk 6' |

Lee Valley Hockey and Tennis Centre, London
Umpires:
Alison Keogh (IRL)
Michelle Meister (GER)

19 June 2022
11:30

| China | 1–2 | United States |
|---|---|---|
| Zhang Y. 6' | Report | Hoffman 14'; Hammel 32' |

Hazelaarweg Stadion, Rotterdam, Netherlands
Umpires:
Céline Martin-Schmets (BEL)
Ivona Makar (CRO)

19 June 2022
13:00

| England | 1–4 | Belgium |
|---|---|---|
| Howard 41' | Report | Vanden Borre 12', 33'; Rasir 28', 55' |

Lee Valley Hockey and Tennis Centre, London
Umpires:
Alison Keogh (IRL)
Michelle Meister (GER)

19 June 2022
14:00

| India | 2–3 | Argentina |
|---|---|---|
| Salima 23'; Grace 48' | Report | Thome 38'; Trinchinetti 41'; Gorzelany 43' |

Hazelaarweg Stadion, Rotterdam, Netherlands
Umpires:
Liu Xiaoying (CHN)
Laurine Delforge (BEL)

21 June 2022
16:30

| United States | 2–4 | India |
|---|---|---|
| Grega 28'; Konerth 45+' | Report | Grace 31'; Navneet 32'; Sonika 40'; Vandana 50' |

Hazelaarweg Stadion, Rotterdam, Netherlands
Umpires:
Liu Xiaoying (CHN)
Céline Martin-Schmets (BEL)

21 June 2022
19:00

| China | 1–2 | Netherlands |
|---|---|---|
| Chen Ya. 32' | Report | Leurink 29'; Verschoor 52' |

Hazelaarweg Stadion, Rotterdam, Netherlands
Umpires:
Laurine Delforge (BEL)
Bruce Bale (ENG)

22 June 2022
16:30

| United States | 0–4 | India |
|---|---|---|
| | Report | Vandana 39', 54'; Sonika 54'; Sangita 57' |

Hazelaarweg Stadion, Rotterdam, Netherlands
Umpires:
Liu Xiaoying (CHN)
Bruce Bale (ENG)

22 June 2022
19:00

| China | 0–6 | Netherlands |
|---|---|---|
| | Report | Verschoor 13'; Albers 15'; Matla 18', 32', 35'; Welten 45' |

Hazelaarweg Stadion, Rotterdam, Netherlands
Umpires:
Laurine Delforge (BEL)
Céline Martin-Schmets (BEL)

25 June 2022
11:30

| United States | 0–5 | Belgium |
|---|---|---|
| | Report | Versavel 29', 38'; Raye 48', 56'; Vanden Borre 48' |

HC 's-Hertogenbosch, 's-Hertogenbosch, Netherlands
Umpires:
Liu Xiaoying (CHN)
Sophie Bockelmann (GER)

25 June 2022
14:00

| China | 3–0 | Germany |
|---|---|---|
| Li H. 10'; Zhang Y. 12'; Gu B. 51' | Report |

HC 's-Hertogenbosch, 's-Hertogenbosch, Netherlands
Umpires:
Kelly Hudson (NZL)
Emi Yamada (JPN)

26 June 2022
11:00

| United States | 0–3 | Belgium |
|---|---|---|
| | Report | Ballenghien 26'; Gerniers 37'; Versavel 52' |

HC 's-Hertogenbosch, 's-Hertogenbosch, Netherlands
Umpires:
Liu Xiaoying (CHN)
Sophie Bockelmann (GER)

26 June 2022
13:30

| China | 0–4 | Germany |
|---|---|---|
| | Report | Maertens 13', 24', 28'; Pieper 56' |

HC 's-Hertogenbosch, 's-Hertogenbosch, Netherlands
Umpires:
Kelly Hudson (NZL)
Emi Yamada (JPN)

| India | Cancelled (Note: The matches, originally scheduled for 2 and 3 April 2022, were postponed due to positive COVID-19 tests and injured players. The matches were cancelled later on.) | England |

| India | Cancelled | England |

== Goalscorers ==
There were 264 goals scored in 70 matches, for an average of 3.77 goals per match.

12 goals

- (Argentina) Agustina Gorzelany

9 goals

- (Netherlands) Yibbi Jansen

7 goals

- (Belgium) Stéphanie Vanden Borre
- (Germany) Pia Maertens
- (Netherlands) Frédérique Matla

6 goals

- (Argentina) María José Granatto
- (Argentina) Eugenia Trinchinetti
- (Belgium) Ambre Ballenghien
- (China) Gu Bingfeng
- (England) Grace Balsdon
- (Germany) Sonja Zimmermann
- (Spain) Xantal Giné

5 goals

- (Argentina) Victoria Granatto
- (India) Gurjit Kaur
- (Netherlands) Freeke Moes
- (Netherlands) Lidewij Welten

4 goals

- (Belgium) Abi Raye
- (England) Tessa Howard
- (England) Ellie Rayer
- (India) Vandana Katariya

3 goals

- (Argentina) Agustina Albertario
- (Argentina) Julieta Jankunas
- (Belgium) Louise Versavel
- (China) Zhang Ying
- (Germany) Nike Lorenz
- (India) Navneet Kaur
- (India) Neha Goyal
- (India) Sonika Tandi
- (Netherlands) Joosje Burg
- (Spain) Begoña García Grau
- (Spain) Georgina Oliva
- (Spain) Marta Segú
- (United States) Danielle Grega

2 goals

- (Argentina) Valentina Costa
- (Argentina) Rocío Sánchez
- (Argentina) Delfina Thome
- (Belgium) Barbara Nelen
- (Belgium) Charlotte Englebert
- (Belgium) Alix Gerniers
- (Belgium) France de Mot
- (Belgium) Justine Rasir
- (Belgium) Michelle Struijk
- (China) Chen Yang
- (China) Li Hong
- (China) Yuan Meng
- (England) Darcy Bourne
- (England) Hollie Pearne-Webb
- (Germany) Hannah Gablać
- (Germany) Lena Micheel
- (India) Deep Grace Ekka
- (India) Lalremsiami
- (India) Salima Tete
- (India) Sangita Kumari
- (India) Sushila Chanu
- (Netherlands) Felice Albers
- (Netherlands) Fiona Morgenstern
- (Netherlands) Maria Verschoor
- (Spain) Laura Barrios
- (Spain) Maialen García
- (United States) Ashley Hoffman
- (United States) Erin Matson
- (United States) Megan Rodgers

1 goal

- (Argentina) Jimena Cedrés
- (Argentina) Martina Triñanes
- (Belgium) Lucie Breyne
- (Belgium) Delphine Marien
- (Belgium) Alexia 'T Serstevens
- (China) Chen Ling
- (China) Deng Xue
- (China) Wang Shumin
- (China) Zhang Xindan
- (England) Giselle Ansley
- (England) Sophie Hamilton
- (England) Holly Hunt
- (England) Pippa Lock
- (England) Hannah Martin
- (England) Lily Owsley
- (England) Izzy Petter
- (England) Anna Toman
- (Germany) Charlotte Gerstenhöfer
- (Germany) Hanna Granitzki
- (Germany) Elisa Gräve
- (Germany) Viktoria Huse
- (Germany) Stine Kurz
- (Germany) Cécile Pieper
- (Germany) Carlotta Sippel
- (Germany) Charlotte Stapenhorst
- (Germany) Sara Strauss
- (Germany) Felicia Wiedermann
- (India) Jyoti
- (India) Namita Toppo
- (India) Nisha Warsi
- (India) Rajwinder Kaur
- (India) Sharmila Devi
- (Netherlands) Ireen van den Assem
- (Netherlands) Tessa Clasener
- (Netherlands) Renée van Laarhoven
- (Netherlands) Laurien Leurink
- (Netherlands) Maxime Kerstholt
- (Netherlands) Pien Sanders
- (Netherlands) Xan de Waard
- (Spain) Patricia Álvarez
- (Spain) Florencia Amundson
- (Spain) Sara Barrios
- (Spain) Belén Iglesias
- (United States) Alexandra Hammel
- (United States) Leah Crouse
- (United States) Natalie Konerth
- (United States) Alia Marshall

Source: FIH

== See also ==
- 2021–22 Men's FIH Pro League
