= Socino =

Socino is a surname. Notable people with the surname include:

- Juan Pablo Socino (born 1988), Argentine rugby union player
- Mercedes Socino (born 1990), Argentine-Italian field hockey player
- Santiago Socino (born 1992), Argentine rugby union player
