= 2020 Argentina Women's Hockey National Tournament =

2020 sports event

Tournament details
- Host country: Argentina
- Dates: Postponed
- Teams: 8

The 2020 Argentina Women's Hockey National Tournament is the 12th edition of the women's national tournament. It is going to be held from 24 to 27 September 2020.

The competition was first scheduled to be held from 15 to 18 October in Santa Fe, but because of the COVID-19 pandemic the location and date were modified.

On June 11, it was announced that the competition will be postponed to 2021.

Mendoza is the defending champion.

== Teams ==
- Buenos Aires
- (Buenos Aires Province) Bahía Blanca
- (Buenos Aires Province) Mar del Plata
- (Córdoba Province, Argentina) Córdoba
- (Mendoza Province) Mendoza (defending champions)
- (Santa Fe Province) Rosario
- (San Juan Province, Argentina) San Juan
- (Santa Fe Province) Santa Fe
