= Ginella Zerbo =

Dutch field hockey player (born 1997)

Personal information
- Born: 5 May 1997 (age 29)

Sport
- Sport: Field hockey
- Position: Attacker
Medal record
Women's field hockey
Representing the Netherlands
Youth Olympic Games
Silver medal – second place	2014 Nanjing	Team
European Championships
Silver medal – second place	2015 London	Team
Champions Trophy
Gold medal – first place	2018 Changzhou	Team

Ginella Zerbo (born 5 May 1997) is a Dutch field hockey player. Zerbo scored the winning goal in the semi-final of the 2015 European Championship.
