= Antonella Rinaldi =

Italian voice actress

- Born: 12 October 1954 (age 71); Rome, Italy
- Occupation: Voice actress
- Years active: 1980–present
- Spouse: Mauro Gravina
- Children: Benedetta Gravina
- Parents: Giuseppe Rinaldi (father); Marina Dolfin (mother)
- Relatives: Maria Pia Casilio (stepmother); Massimo Rinaldi (brother); Francesca Rinaldi (half-sister); Toti Dal Monte (grandmother)

Antonella Rinaldi (born 12 October 1954) is an Italian voice actress.

== Biography ==
Rinaldi was born in Rome. She is the daughter of historical voice actor Giuseppe Rinaldi and actress Marina Dolfin, and her maternal grandmother was operatic soprano Toti Dal Monte. She is best known for voicing Lois Griffin in the Italian-Language version of the animated sitcom Family Guy. She has also dubbed Jennifer Jason Leigh, Laura Linney, Jennifer Tilly, Amanda Plummer and Andie MacDowell in some of their films.

In 2011, she and her husband Mauro Gravina made a guest appearance on the web show Freaks!

=== Personal life ===
From her marriage to voice actor Mauro Gravina, they have a daughter, Benedetta, who is also a voice actress.

== Dubbing roles ==
=== Animation ===
- Lois Griffin in Family Guy
- Laa-Laa in Teletubbies
- Linda Flynn in Phineas and Ferb
- Betty Beetle in Miss Spider's Sunny Patch Friends
- Spindella in Miss Spider's Sunny Patch Friends
- Sassette Smurfling in The Smurfs
- Chip (since 1990)
- Webbigail "Webby" Vanderquack in DuckTales
- Old One in The Land Before Time IV: Journey Through the Mists
- Judy in Tweenies
- Flat Person in ChalkZone

=== Live action ===
- Amy Archer in The Hudsucker Proxy
- Yolanda/"Honey Bunny" in Pulp Fiction
- Stacy in Made in America
- Alison Langley in Bean: The Ultimate Disaster Movie
- Maria in Snakes on a Plane
- Susan Robinson in Sesame Street
- Mia in Catastrophe
- Wynonna in Blue's Clues
- Imani Izzi in Coming to America
- Jackie Tyler in Doctor Who
- Kate in The Six Wives of Henry Lefay
- Jude in The Last Supper
- Ophelia in Hamlet
