= Chiko Fujibayashi =

Japanese field hockey player

Personal information
- Born: 14 January 1996 (age 30) Shiga Prefecture, Japan
- Height: 161 cm (5 ft 3 in)
- Weight: 55 kg (121 lb)

Sport
- Sport: Field hockey
- Position: Midfield
Senior career
Years	Team	Caps	Goals
–	Coca Cola Red Sparks	-	-
National team
Years	Team	Caps	Goals
2016	Japan U–21	5	(0)
2017–	Japan	26	(6)
Medal record
Women's field hockey
Representing Japan
Asian Cup
Gold medal – first place	2022 Muscat
Bronze medal – third place	2025 Hangzhou
Asian Champions Trophy
Silver medal – second place	2023 Ranchi
FIH Nations Cup
Bronze medal – third place	2022 Valencia

Chiko Fujibayashi (藤林 千子, born 14 January 1996) is a Japanese field hockey player.

== Personal life ==
Chiko Fujibayashi was born in the Shiga Prefecture.

== Career ==
=== Domestic league ===
In the Japanese national league, Fujibayashi represents the Coca Cola Red Sparks.

=== Under–21 ===
In 2016, Fujibayashi was a member of the Japanese U–21 team at the FIH Junior World Cup in Santiago.

=== Cherry Blossoms ===
Fujibayashi made her senior international debut in 2017 at the Asian Cup in Kakamigahara.

Throughout her career, Fujibayashi has medalled with the national team numerous times. She won gold at the 2022 Asian Cup in Muscat, silver at the 2023 Asian Champions Trophy in Ranchi and bronze at the 2022 FIH Nations Cup in Valencia.

She was named in the squad for the 2024 FIH Olympic Qualifiers in Ranchi.
