= Argentina Women's Hockey National Tournament =

- Current season, competition or edition: 2018 Argentina Women's Hockey National Tournament
- Sport: Field hockey
- Founded: 2009
- No. of teams: 8

The Argentina Women's Hockey National Tournament is the field hockey national competition for women, whose format for qualification and final tournament is similar to the men's. It has been held since 2009. The tournament has been organized by the Argentine Hockey Confederation (CAH). Since 2009, it has been held regularly once every year, in the same year as the men's competition.

The tournament has always featured eight teams.

The 2021 tournament was held in Rosario, Argentina from 14 to 17 October, with Buenos Aires winning after beating Córdoba 6–2 in the final.

== Results ==
=== Summaries ===
| Year | Host | Final | | | Third place match |
| Year | Host | Winner | Score | Runner-up | Third place | Score | Fourth place |
|---|---|---|---|---|---|---|---|
| 2009 | | (Mendoza Province) Mendoza | | (Santa Fe Province) Rosario |
| 2010 | | Buenos Aires | | (Mendoza Province) Mendoza |
| 2011 | Mendoza | Buenos Aires | | (Santa Fe Province) Rosario |
| 2012 | Buenos Aires | Buenos Aires | | (Buenos Aires Province) Bahía Blanca |
| 2013; Details | Córdoba | (Mendoza Province) Mendoza | 2 (5) - 2 (4) | Buenos Aires | (Santa Fe Province) Rosario | 4 - 1 | (Salta Province) Salta |
| 2014; Details | Buenos Aires | Buenos Aires | 3 - 0 | (Santa Fe Province) Rosario | (Mendoza Province) Mendoza | 3 - 2 | (Salta Province) Salta |
| 2015; Details | Rosario | Buenos Aires | 1 - 0 | (Córdoba Province, Argentina) Córdoba | (Mendoza Province) Mendoza | 4 - 1 | (Santa Fe Province) Rosario |
| 2016; Details | Tucumán | Buenos Aires | 2 - 1 | (Mendoza Province) Mendoza | (Tucumán Province) Tucumán | 4 - 2 | (Buenos Aires Province) Mar del Plata |
| 2017; Details | Salta | Buenos Aires | 3 - 1 | (Mendoza Province) Mendoza | (Tucumán Province) Tucumán | 3 - 1 | (Córdoba Province, Argentina) Córdoba |
| 2018; Details | Buenos Aires | Buenos Aires | 2 - 0 | (Tucumán Province) Tucumán | (Buenos Aires Province) Bahía Blanca | 2 (4) - 2 (3) | (Santa Fe Province) Santa Fe |
| 2019; Details | Mendoza | (Mendoza Province) Mendoza | 3 - 0 | (Córdoba Province, Argentina) Córdoba | (Buenos Aires Province) Bahía Blanca | 0 (2) - 0 (0) | Buenos Aires |
| 2021; Details | Rosario | Buenos Aires | 6 - 2 | (Córdoba Province, Argentina) Córdoba | (Buenos Aires Province) Bahía Blanca | 2 - 1 | (Mendoza Province) Mendoza |
| 2022; Details | Santa Fe | Buenos Aires | 0 (2) - 0 (0) | (Córdoba Province, Argentina) Córdoba | (Santa Fe Province) Rosario | 2 - 1 | (Buenos Aires Province) Bahía Blanca |
| 2023; Details | Tucumán | Buenos Aires | 2 - 0 | (Mendoza Province) Mendoza | (Buenos Aires Province) Bahía Blanca | 2 - 1 | (Córdoba Province, Argentina) Córdoba |

== Team appearances ==
| Team | 2009 | 2010 | 2011 | 2012 | 2013 | 2014 | 2015 | 2016 | 2017 | 2018 | 2019 |
|---|---|---|---|---|---|---|---|---|---|---|---|
| (Buenos Aires Province) Bahía Blanca's Hockey Association (Bahía Blanca) | - | - | - | - | - | - | 5th | 7th | - | 3rd | 3rd |
| Amateur Field Hockey Association of Buenos Aires (Buenos Aires) | - | 1st | 1st | 1st | 2nd | 1st | 1st | 1st | 1st | 1st | 4th |
| (Córdoba Province, Argentina) Cordoba's Hockey Federation (Córdoba) | - | - | - | - | 5th | 5th | 2nd | 5th | 4th | 6th | 2nd |
| (Buenos Aires Province) Mar del Plata's Hockey Association (Mar del Plata) | - | - | - | 2nd | - | 7th | - | 4th | 7th | - | - |
| (Mendoza Province) Mendoza's Hockey Association (Mendoza) | 1st | 2nd | - | - | 1st | 3rd | 3rd | 2nd | 2nd | 5th | 1st |
| (Misiones Province) Misiones's Hockey Federation (Misiones) | - | - | - | - | - | - | - | 6th | 8th | - | 7th |
| (Santa Fe Province) Litoral's Hockey Association (Rosario) | 2nd | - | 2nd | - | 3rd | 2nd | 4th | 8th | - | - | 5th |
| (Salta Province) Salta's Hockey Association (Salta) | - | - | - | - | 4th | 4th | 7th | - | 5th | 7th | - |
| (San Juan Province, Argentina) San Juan's Hockey Association (San Juan) | - | - | - | - | 8th | - | - | - | 6th | 8th | - |
| (Santa Fe Province) Santa Fe's Hockey Association (Santa Fe) | - | - | - | - | 7th | - | 8th | - | - | 4th | 6th |
| (Santiago del Estero Province) Santiago del Estero's Hockey Federation (Santiago del Estero) | - | - | - | - | - | 8th | - | - | - | - | - |
| (Tucumán Province) Tucuman's Hockey Association (Tucumán) | - | - | - | - | 6th | 6th | 6th | - | 3rd | 2nd | 8th |
| Total | 8 | 8 | 8 | 8 | 8 | 8 | 8 | 8 | 8 | 8 | 8 |
