= Zhang Xindan =

Chinese field hockey player

Personal information
- Born: 3 August 1997 (age 28) China

Sport
- Sport: Field hockey
- Position: Forward
National team
Years	Team	Caps	Goals
2014	China U–18	8	(10)
2021–	China	19	(6)
Medal record
Women's field hockey
Representing China
Youth Olympic Games
Gold medal – first place	2014 Nanjing	Team
Asian Cup
Silver medal – second place	2017 Kakamigahara	Team
Asian Champions Trophy
Bronze medal – third place	2021 Donghae City	Team

Zhang Xindan (born 3 August 1997) is a Chinese field hockey player who plays as a forward.

== Career ==
=== Under–18 ===
In 2014, Zhang Xindan was a member of the gold medal-winning Chinese U–18 team at the Youth Olympics in Nanjing.

=== National team ===
Zhang made her debut for the national team in 2017 at the Asian Cup in Kakamigahara, where she won a silver medal.

She has gone on to make a number of appearances for the national team. In 2021 she won a bronze medal at the Asian Champions Trophy in Donghae City. She most recently represented her country in season three of the FIH Pro League.
