= Romina Ríos =

Mexican footballer (born 2003)

Personal information
- Full name: Romina Ibeth Ríos Ortiz
- Date of birth: 28 November 2003 (age 22)
- Place of birth: Pénjamo, Guanajuato, Mexico
- Height: 1.58 m (5 ft 2 in)
- Position: Centre-back

Senior career*
Years	Team	Apps	(Gls)
2020–2022	Pachuca	14	(0)
2022–2023	León	13	(0)
2024–2026	Mazatlán	49	(0)
- * Club domestic league appearances and goals as of 9 February 2026

Romina Ibeth Ríos Ortiz (born 28 November 2003) is a Mexican professional footballer who plays as a centre-back.

== Career ==
In 2020, she started her career in Pachuca. In 2022, she got transferred to León. In 2024, she joined Mazatlán.
