= Kyra Fortuin =

Dutch field hockey player (born 1997)

Personal information
- Born: 15 May 1997 (age 29) Maastricht, Netherlands

Sport
- Sport: Field hockey
- Position: Forward
- Club: SCHC
Youth career
- Years: Team
- 2004–2010: MHC
- 2010–2015: Oranje Zwart
Senior career
Years	Team	Caps	Goals
2011–2016	Oranje Zwart	-	-
2016–2017	Oranje-Rood	-	-
2017–present	SCHC	-	-
National team
Years	Team	Caps	Goals
2014–2015	Netherlands U18	12	(6)
2015–2017	Netherlands U21	13	(2)
2019–present	Netherlands	7	(3)
Medal record
Women's field hockey
Representing Netherlands
Junior World Cup
Silver medal – second place	2016 Santiago
EuroHockey Junior Championship
Gold medal – first place	2017 Valencia
Women's hockey5s
Youth Olympic Games
Silver medal – second place	2014 Nanjing	Team

Kyra Fortuin (born 15 May 1997) is a field hockey player from the Netherlands, who plays as a forward.

== Personal life ==
Kyra Fortuin was born and raised in Maastricht, Netherlands.

== Career ==
=== Club hockey ===
In the Dutch Hoofdklasse, Fortuin plays club hockey for SCHC.

Her club history includes representation for Oranje Zwart and HC Oranje-Rood.

=== National teams ===
==== Under–21 ====
In 2016, Fortuin appeared for the Netherlands U–21 on two occasions. Her first appearance was during a Four–Nations Tournament in Bad Kreuznach, Germany, and the second at the Junior World Cup in Santiago, Chile. At the tournament, Fortuin scored two goals, and helped the team to a silver medal finish, losing in the final to Argentina.

The following year in 2017, Fortuin won her first gold medal with the team at the EuroHockey Junior Championship in Valencia, Spain.

==== Oranje Dames ====
In 2019, Fortuin made her debut for the Netherlands senior team during the inaugural tournament of the FIH Pro League.
