= Maxime Kerstholt =

Dutch field hockey player

Personal information
- Born: 24 February 1996 (age 30)
- Height: 1.79 m (5 ft 10 in)

Sport
- Sport: Field hockey
- Position: Forward
- Club: Pinoké
National team
Years	Team	Caps	Goals
2017–	Netherlands	11	(6)
Medal record
Champions Trophy
Gold medal – first place	2018 Changzhou

Maxime Kerstholt (born 24 February 1996) is a Dutch field hockey player in 2012–2024.

From 2012 to 2022, she played for Laren. In 2022, she played for Pinoké in the Dutch field hockey league.

Kerstholt made her debut for the Netherlands national team on 23 January 2017 in a friendly match against Spain.

She won the gold medal at the 2018 Champions Trophy in Changzhou, China.
