= Sofía Toccalino =

Argentine field hockey player

Personal information
- Born: 20 March 1997 (age 29) Luján, Argentina

Sport
- Sport: Field hockey
- Position: Defender
- Club: St. Catherine's
Senior career
Years	Team	Caps	Goals
–2021	St. Catherine's	-	-
2021–2022	Royal Antwerp HC	-	-
2022–2026	St. Catherine's	-	-
2026–	Gantoise	-	-
National team
Years	Team	Caps	Goals
2015–	Argentina	221	(19)
Medal record
Olympic Games
Silver medal – second place	2020 Tokyo	Team
Bronze medal – third place	2024 Paris	Team
World Cup
Gold medal – first place	2026 Wavre/Amstelveen
Silver medal – second place	2022 Terrassa/Amstelveen
World League
Gold medal – first place	2014–15 Rosario
Champions Trophy
Bronze medal – third place	2018 Changzhou
Pan American Games
Gold medal – first place	2019 Lima	Team
Gold medal – first place	2023 Santiago	Team
South American Games
Gold medal – first place	2018 Cochabamba
Pan American Cup
Gold medal – first place	2022 Santiago
Gold medal – first place	2025 Montevideo
Junior World Cup
Gold medal – first place	2016 Santiago
Youth Olympic Games
Bronze medal – third place	2014 Nanjing	Team

Sofía Toccalino (born 20 March 1997), nickname Poy, is an Argentine field hockey player and part of the Argentina national team. She plays with the Argentina national field hockey team, winning silver medal at the 2020 Summer Olympics.

== Career ==
She competed at the 2016 Women's Hockey Junior World Cup, winning the gold medal. On club level she plays for St. Catherine's in Argentina.

With the Argentina national field hockey team she won the gold medal at the World League 2014–15, the bronze medal at the 2014 World Cup in The Hague, Netherlands, the gold medal at the 2019 Pan American Games, the 2021-22 Hockey Pro League, the gold medal at the 2022 Pan American Cup, and the silver medal at the 2022 World Cup. In 2023 she won again the gold medal at 2023 Pan American Games.

She also won the bronze medal with Las Leonas at the 2024 Paris Summer Olympics.

== Other sources ==
- "News for 01 April 2016". fieldhockey.com.
- Todor Krastev. "Women Field Hockey 2nd World League 2014-2015 - Final Round in Rosario (ARG) 05-13.12 - Winner Argentina". todor66.com.
- "Imagens e fotografias de stock". Getty Images.
- "2014 Youth Pan Am (W) - Martina Trinares y Sofia Toccalino (ARG players)". YouTube. 12 February 2014.
