= Clara Barberi =

Argentine field hockey player

Personal information
- Born: 19 April 1992 (age 34) Buenos Aires, Argentina
- Height: 159 cm (5 ft 3 in)
- Weight: 62 kg (137 lb)

Sport
- Sport: Field hockey
- Position: Goalkeeper
- Club: Lomas
National team
Years	Team	Caps	Goals
2017, 2020-	Argentina	2	-
Medal record
World Cup
Silver medal – second place	2022 Terrassa/Amstelveen
Pan American Games
Gold medal – first place	2023 Santiago	Team
Pan American Cup
Gold medal – first place	2022 Santiago

Clara Barberi (born 19 April 1992) is an Argentine field hockey player.
