= Emilia Forcherio =

Argentine field hockey player

María Emilia Forcherio
Personal information
- Born: 16 February 1995 (age 31) Buenos Aires, Argentina

Sport
- Sport: Field hockey
- Position: Defender
- Club: Lomas Athletic Club
National team
Years	Team	Caps	Goals
2020–Present	Argentina	3	-
Medal record
Olympic Games
Silver medal – second place	2020 Tokyo	Team
World Cup
Silver medal – second place	2022 Terrassa/Amstelveen

María Emilia Forcherio (born 16 February 1995) is an Argentine field hockey player.

== Hockey career ==
In 2020, Forcherio was called into the senior national women's team.
