= Mariana Scandura =

Argentine field hockey player

Mariana Beatríz Scandura
Personal information
- Born: 2 May 1994 (age 32) San Martín, Argentina
- Height: 171 cm (5 ft 7 in)
- Weight: 69 kg (152 lb)

Sport
- Sport: Field hockey
- Position: Goalkeeper
- Club: Polo Club Barcelona
National team
Years	Team	Caps	Goals
2015, 2018, 2019-	Argentina	3	-
Medal record
Women's field hockey
Representing Argentina
South American Games
Gold medal – first place	2018 Cochabamba

Mariana Beatriz Scandura (born 2 May 1994) is an Argentinian field hockey player.

== Hockey career ==
In 2018, Scandura was called into the senior national women's team that won the 2018 South American Games.
