= Mercedes Socino =

Italian-Argentine field hockey player

Personal information
- Born: 28 February 1990 (age 36)

Sport
- Sport: Field hockey
- Position: Midfielder
- Club: Hurling Club
National team
Years	Team	Caps	Goals
–	Italy	30	-

Mercedes "Maria" Socino (born 28 February 1990) is an Italian-Argentine field hockey player who played for the Italy national team.

== Career ==
Socino received her first national team camp callup for Argentina in 2011.

She participated at the 2018 Women's Hockey World Cup.
