= Priscila Jardel =

Argentine field hockey player

Priscila Jardel Mateos
Personal information
- Born: 16 February 1996 (age 30) Mendoza, Argentina
- Height: 167 cm (5 ft 6 in)
- Weight: 58 kg (128 lb)

Sport
- Sport: Field hockey
- Position: Forward
- Club: Royal Daring HC
Senior career
Years	Team	Caps	Goals
–2017	Los Tordos Rugby Club	-	-
2018–2020	River Plate	-	-
2020–	Royal Daring HC	-	-
National team
Years	Team	Caps	Goals
2014	Argentina U17	8	(16)
2015–2016	Argentina U21	15	(6)
2017–Present	Argentina	21	(8)
Medal record
Women's field hockey
Representing Argentina
South American Games
Gold medal – first place	2018 Cochabamba
Junior World Cup
Gold medal – first place	2016 Santiago	Team

Pricila Jardel Mateos (born 16 January 1996) is an Argentinian field hockey player.

== Hockey career ==
Jardel was part of the Argentina Junior National Team at the 2016 Junior World Cup where the team won the gold medal, defeating the Netherlands in the final.

In 2018, Jardel took part of the team that won the 2018 South American Games.
