= Delfina Thome Gustavino =

Argentine field hockey player

María Delfina Thome
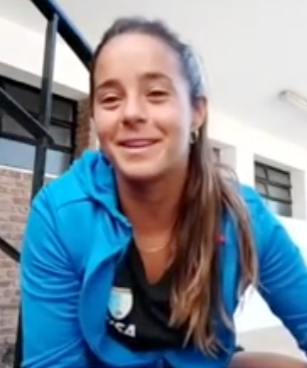
- In a 2021 interview

Personal information
- Born: 10 September 1996 (age 29) Mendoza, Argentina
- Height: 166 cm (5 ft 5 in)
- Weight: 62 kg (137 lb)

Sport
- Sport: Field hockey
- Position: Forward
- Club: Liceo Rugby Club
National team
Years	Team	Caps	Goals
2014-2016	Argentina U21		-
2019-	Argentina	13	-
Medal record
Women's field hockey
Representing Argentina
World Cup
Silver medal – second place	2022 Terrassa/Amstelveen
Pan American Games
Gold medal – first place	2023 Santiago	Team
Pan American Cup
Gold medal – first place	2022 Santiago
Summer Youth Olympics
Bronze medal – third place	2014 Nanjing	Team

María Delfina Thome (born 10 September 1996) is an Argentine field hockey player.

== Hockey career ==
Thome Gustavino took her first steps at the Los Tordos Rugby Club. Later, thanks to the influence of Marcela Bracelli, Delfina continued her career at the Los Tordos Rugby Club her current club.

She was part of the Argentina Junior National Team at the 2014 Youth Olympics where the team won the bronze medal.

In late 2019 she was called to join the national team.
