= Bárbara Dichiara =

Argentine field hockey player

Personal information
- Born: 13 November 1996 (age 29) Monte Hermoso, Argentina
- Height: 174 cm (5 ft 9 in)
- Weight: 66 kg (146 lb)

Sport
- Sport: Field hockey
- Position: Defender
- Club: C.A. Monte Hermoso
National team
Years	Team	Caps	Goals
2017–18, 2020-	Argentina	7	(1)
Medal record
Women's field hockey
Representing Argentina
Pan American Cup
Gold medal – first place	2022 Santiago
South American Games
Gold medal – first place	2018 Cochabamba
Junior World Cup
Gold medal – first place	2016 Santiago
Youth Olympic Games
Bronze medal – third place	2014 Nanjing	Team

Bárbara Dichiara (born 13 November 1996) is an Argentine field hockey player.

== Hockey career ==
Dichiara was part of the Argentina Junior National Team at the 2016 Junior World Cup where the team won the gold medal, defeating the Netherlands in the final.

In 2018, Dichiara took part of the team that won the 2018 South American Games.
