= Julieta Jankunas =

Argentine field hockey player (born 1999)

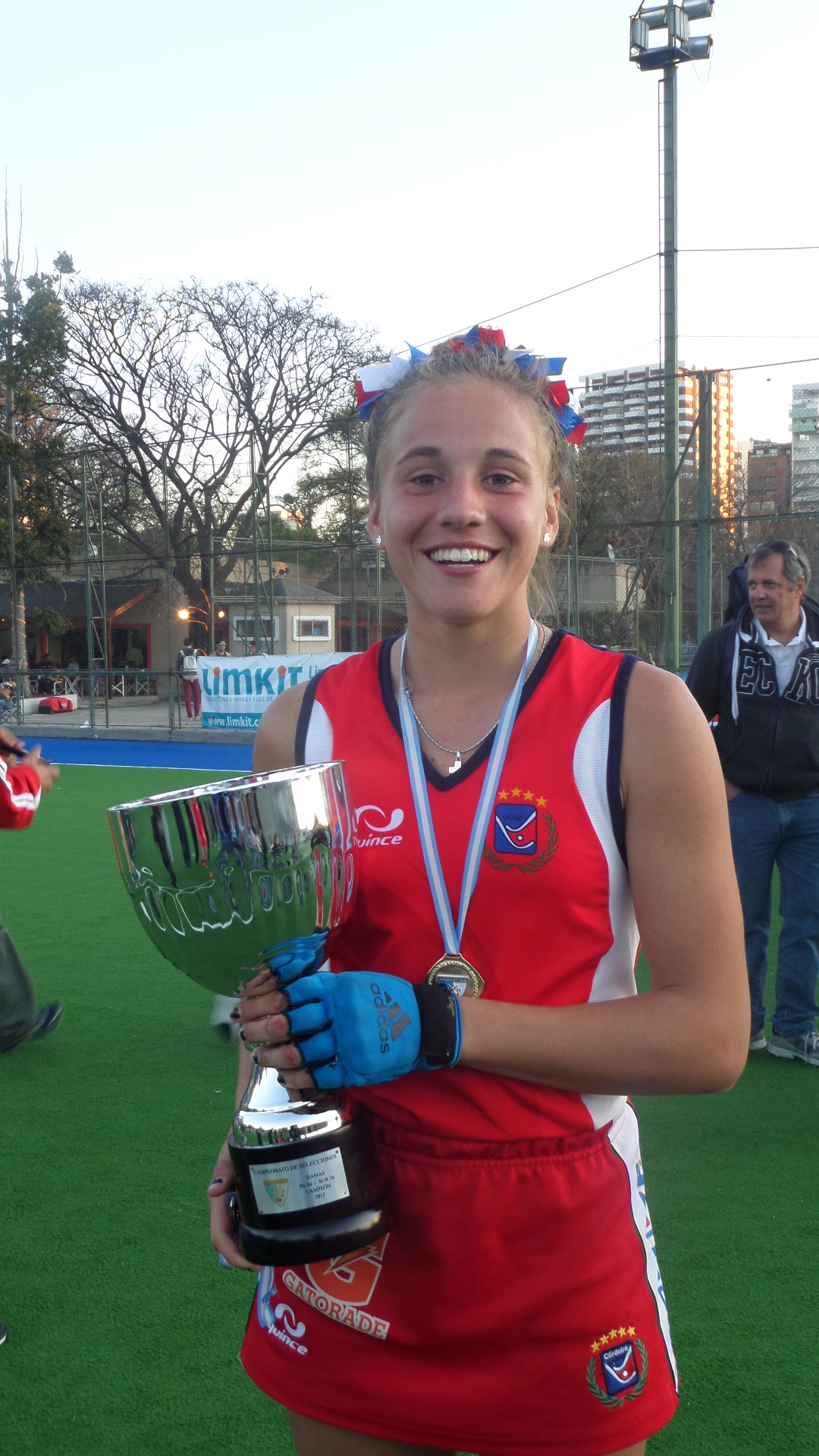
- Jankunas in 2015

Personal information
- Born: 20 January 1999 (age 27) Córdoba, Argentina
- Height: 1.67 m (5 ft 6 in)
- Weight: 60 kg (132 lb)

Sport
- Sport: Field hockey
- Position: Forward
- Club: Hacoaj
Senior career
Years	Team	Caps	Goals
–2017	Universitario (C)	-	-
2018–2021	Club Ciudad	-	-
2021–2023	Victoria	-	-
2023–2024	Universitario (C)	-	-
2024–2025	Egara	-	-
2026–	Hacoaj	-	-
National team
Years	Team	Caps	Goals
2015–	Argentina	219	(121)
Medal record
Olympic Games
Silver medal – second place	2020 Tokyo	Team
Bronze medal – third place	2024 Paris	Team
World Cup
Gold medal – first place	2026 Wavre/Amstelveen
Silver medal – second place	2022 Terrassa/Amstelveen
Champions Trophy
Bronze medal – third place	2018 Changzhou
Pan American Games
Gold medal – first place	2019 Lima	Team
Gold medal – first place	2023 Santiago	Team
Pan American Cup
Gold medal – first place	2017 Lancaster
Gold medal – first place	2022 Santiago
Gold medal – first place	2025 Montevideo
South American Games
Gold medal – first place	2018 Cochabamba
Junior World Cup
Gold medal – first place	2016 Santiago
Pan American Junior Championship
Gold medal – first place	2016 Trinidad and Tobago
Youth Olympic Games
Bronze medal – third place	2014 Nanjing	Team

Julieta Jankunas (born 20 January 1999) is an Argentine field hockey player and part of the Argentina national team. She plays with the Argentina national field hockey team, winning silver medal at the 2020 Summer Olympics.

== Career ==
She participated in the 2014 Summer Youth Olympics, and the 2016 Women's Hockey Junior World Cup. She won a gold medal at the 2019 Pan American Games, and also at the 2023 Games.

She was part of the national squad that won the 2022 Pan American Cup. In 2022, she also won the 2021-22 Hockey Pro League and the silver medal at the 2022 World Cup.

On club level, she plays for Universitario de Córdoba in Argentina. In December 2019, she was nominated for the FIH Rising Star of the Year Award.
