= 2016 Women's Hockey Junior World Cup squads =

This article lists the confirmed squads for the 2016 Women's Hockey Junior World Cup tournament held in Santiago, Chile between 24 November and 4 December 2016.

== Pool A ==
=== Netherlands ===
Head coach: Rick Mathijssen

1. Josine Koning (GK)
3. Maud Renders
4. Charlotte Adegeest
6. Hester van der Veld
7. Lisa Visser
8. Yentl Leemans
9. Fabienne Roosen
11. Pien Sanders
12. Maxime Kerstholt
13. Michelle Fillet
14. Kyra Fortuin
15. Frédérique Matla
16. Joosje Burg
18. Pleun van der Plas
20. Ilse Kappelle
21. Imme van der Hoek
22. Maartje Krekelaar (C)
30. Anne Veenendaal (GK)

=== South Korea ===
Head coach: Kim Yong-soo

1. Lim Eun-hee (GK)
2. Mun Seung-hwa
3. Kim Min-ji
5. Kim Jin-mi
6. Kwon So-yeong
7. Lee Yu-ri
8. Kang Su-yeong
9. Moon So-yun
10. Kim Seo-yeong
11. Cho Hye-jin (C)
12. Cho Eun-ji
13. Kim Hyun-mi
14. Choi Seo-young
16. Jung Are-um
17. Kim Su-yeon
18. Lee Seung-ju
20. Hong Huig-yeong
22. Choi You-bin (GK)

=== United States ===
Head coach: Janneke Schopman

2. Brooke DeBerdine
3. Julianna Tornetta
5. Sophia Tornetta
5. Amanda Magadan
6. Erin Matson
7. Catherine Caro
9. Nicole Woods
10. Gabrielle Major
11. Lauren Moyer
12. Madeleine Bacskai
13. Ashley Hoffman
14. Laura Hurff
15. Margaux Paolino
16. Julia Young (C)
17. Caroline Hanks
18. Linnea Gonzales
31. Kelsey Bing (GK)
32. Jennifer Rizzo (GK)

=== Zimbabwe ===
The squad was announced on 26 September 2016.

Head coach: Patricia Davies

1. Jordyn Clipstone (GK)
2. Lauren Dent (GK)
3. Carla van Oudtshoorn
4. Stephanie Capmbell (C)
5. Kelly Diplock
6. Jessica Dollar
7. Aimee-Beth Nativel
8. Megan Shaxson
9. Tyla Groenewald
10. Chelsea Dollar
11. Simone Herbst
12. Sinead Cockcroft
13. Sophie McDonald
14. Estelle Stambolie
15. Cheryl Dzapasi
16. Michelle Kabaira
18. Fariyah Omarshah
19. Mufaro Mazambani

== Pool B ==
=== Argentina ===
Head coach: Agustín Corradini

1. Cristina Cosentino (GK)
2. Sofia Toccalino
3. Agustina Gorzelany
4. Eugenia Trinchinetti
5. Agostina Alonso
6. Bianca Donati
7. Milagros Fernández
8. Bárbara Dichiara
9. Priscila Jardel
10. Magdalena Fernández
13. María Rosetti (GK)
14. Guadalupe Fernández
15. María Granatto
16. Lucia Sanguinetti
17. Bárbara Borgia
20. Lucina von der Heyde (C)
26. Maria Ortíz
28. Julieta Jankunas

=== France ===
Head coach: Cedric de Taeye

1. Clelia Deroo
2. Marine Delannoy
4. Emma Ponthieu (C)
5. Alice Demars
6. Victorine Vankemmel
8. Yohanna Lhopital
10. Elysee Lecas
11. Laetitia Canon
12. Inès Lardeur
14. Noa Roque
15. Shirley Lauret
16. Marie Simon
17. Victoria Struys
18. Gabrielle Verrier
20. Ines Brabant
28. Delfina Gaspari
31. Mathilde Petriaux (GK)
32. Manon Bruneau (GK)

=== Germany ===
The squad was announced on 10 November 2016.

Head coach: Marc Haller

1. Rosa Krüger (GK)
2. Noelle Rother (GK)
3. Emma Hessler
4. Hannah Gablać
5. Viktoria Huse (C)
6. Julia Meffert
7. Lena Micheel
9. Elisa Gräve
10. Kira Horn
12. Alisa Vivot
13. Teresa Martin-Pelegrina
14. Michelle Strobel
16. Lara Birkner
17. Amelie Wortmann
18. Maike Schaunig
19. Maxi Marquardt
21. Anelotte Ziehm
22. Hanna Granitzki

=== Japan ===
The squad was announced on 4 October 2016.

Head coach: John Sheahan

1. Yu Asai (C)
2. Azusa Yokota
3. Ayaka Nishimura
4. Airi Nakahana
5. Mei Morikawa
6. Chiko Fujibayashi
7. Natsuha Matsumoto
8. Yui Ishibashi
9. Seina Iwadate
10. Kimika Hoshi
11. Moeka Tsubouchi
12. Akiho Imao
13. Motomi Kawamura
14. Maho Segawa
15. Kanon Mori
16. Mai Toriyama
17. Akio Tanaka (GK)
18. Eika Nakamura (GK)

== Pool C ==
=== Australia ===
The squad was announced on 11 October 2016.

Head coach: Tim White

1. Rebecca Greiner
3. Greta Hayes
4. Madison Fitzpatrick
5. Mikaela Patterson
6. Laura Gray
8. Ambrosia Malone
9. Sophie Taylor
12. Michaela Spano
14. Kristina Bates
15. Kaitlin Nobbs
20. Savannah Fitzpatrick
21. Renee Taylor
23. Kate Hanna
24. Mariah Williams (C)
28. Karri Somerville
30. Grace Stewart
31. Aleisha Power (GK)
32. Rene Hunter (GK)

=== Chile ===
The squad was announced in October 2016.

Head coach: Alejandro Gómez

1. Sachi Ananías (GK)
2. Josefina Cambiaso
4. Fernanda Villagran
5. María Maldonado
6. Agustina Solano
7. Josefa Salas
8. Sophia Lahsen
9. Catalina Peragallo Papić
10. Sofía Machado
11. Paula Valdivia
12. Noemi Abusleme (GK)
13. Pilar Zapico
14. Antonia Morales
15. Doménica Ananías
17. Consuelo de las Heras
18. Denise Krimerman (C)
19. Florencia Martínez
21. Kim Jacob

=== England ===
The squad was announced on 4 November 2016.

Head coach: Craig Keenan

1. Katherine Somerville (GK)
2. Miriam Pritchard (GK)
3. Alice Wills
4. Charlotte Calnan
5. Alicia Caillard
6. Charlotte Daly
7. Kathryn Lane (C)
8. Elizabeth Neal
9. Holly Hunt
10. Olivia Page
11. Holly Munro
12. Megan Crowson
13. Ellie Rayer
14. Eloise Stenner
15. Esme Burge
16. Erica Sanders
17. Lydia MacDonell
18. Harriet Mitchell

=== South Africa ===
The squad was announced on 5 August 2016.

Head coach: Bongani Tshutshani

1. Marlize van Tonder (GK)
2. Christine Seggie
3. Tarryn Glasby
4. Donna Small
5. Marguerite van Wyk
6. Danielle Cairns
7. Marizen Marais
8. Kristen Paton
9. Shirndre-Lee Simmons
10. Marie Louw
11. Tegan Fourie
12. Gretchin Davids
13. Ongeziwe Mali
14. Sisipho Magwaza (GK)
15. Natalie Esteves (C)
16. Nthabeleng Maine
17. Sandisiwe Tabata
18. Marissa Poolman

== Pool D ==
=== Belgium ===
Head coach: Xavier Reckinger

1. Elena Sotgiu (GK)
2. Elodie Picard (GK)
3. Alice Weicker
7. Daphne Gose
8. Lien Hillewaert
9. Pauline Leclef
10. Sophie Limauge
11. Mathilde Raymakers
12. Marie Ronquetti
13. Estelle Meulemans
15. Cassy Boey
16. Lauranne Struijk
17. Tiphaine Duquesne
18. Michelle Struijk
19. Carolien Jakus
20. Joanne Peeters
21. Stéphanie Vanden Borre (C)
22. Victoria de Kepper

=== China ===
Head coach: Weng Haiqin

2. Ou Zixia (C)
3. Shan Zhou
4. Zhang Ying
6. Zhang Lijia
7. Guo Qiu
8. Zhou Yu
9. Xu Wenyu
10. Chen Yang
11. Yuan Meng
12. Tu Yidan
13. Li Hong
15. Liu Hua
20. Zhong Mengling
21. Zhong Jiaqi
25. Tang Wanli
29. Zhang Jinrong
31. Liu Kailin (GK)
32. Yu Yaran (GK)

=== New Zealand ===
The squad was announced on 17 October 2016.

Head coach: Sean Dancer

1. Maddison Dowe
2. Stephanie Dickins
3. Tarryn Davey
5. Megan Hull
6. Alia Jacques
7. Tessa Jopp (C)
8. Catherine Tinning
9. Amy Robinson
10. Frances Davies
11. Tyler Lench
12. Maddi McLean
13. Kirsten Nation (GK)
14. Hattie Jones
15. Emily Wium
16. Phoebe Steele (C)
17. Deanna Ritchie
18. Brooke Roberts (GK)
19. Kayla Reed

=== Spain ===
The squad was announced on 3 November 2016.

Head coach: Adrian Lock

1. Ana Calvo (GK)
3. Clara Ycart
4. Constanza Amundson
7. Anna Gil
8. Clara Valle
9. Anna Fito
10. Florencia Amundson
11. Marta Grau
14. Alejandra Torres-Quevedo
15. Lara Pampín
16. Candela Mejías
17. Mariona Serrahima
18. Paula Arrazola
19. Belén Iglesias
21. Marina Folch (GK)
24. Begoña García (C)
28. Marta Segú
29. Lucía Jiménez
