= 2016 Women's Hockey Under-21 Invitational Tournament =

Tournament details
- Host country: Spain
- City: Valencia
- Dates: 24–30 October
- Teams: 5
- Venue: Estadio Beteró

Final positions
- Champions: Spain
- Runner-up: Germany
- Third place: Belgium

Tournament statistics
- Matches played: 10
- Goals scored: 44 (4.4 per match)
- Top scorer: (England) Megan Crowson (3 goals)

The 2016 Women's Hockey Under-21 Invitational Tournament was an invitational women's under-21 field hockey competition, hosted by Real Federación Española de Hockey. The tournament took place between 24 and 30 October 2016 in Valencia, Spain. A total of five teams competed for the title.

Spain won the tournament, finishing top of the pool after the round-robin stage.

== Teams ==
Including Spain, 5 teams were invited by the Real Federación Española de Hockey to participate in the tournament.

- Belgium
- England
- Germany
- India
- Spain (host nation)

== Officials ==
The following umpires were appointed by the International Hockey Federation to officiate the tournament:

- Anne van den Bosch (BEL)
- Gema Calderón (ESP)
- Angelika Koppen (GER)
- Ivona Makar (CRO)
- Ayanna McClean (TTO)
- Rama Potnis (IND)
- Emma Shelbourn (ENG)

== Results ==
All times are local, Central European Time (UTC+01:00).

=== Pool ===
Pos	Team	Pld	W	D	L	GF	GA	GD	Pts	Qualification
1	Spain (H, C)	4	2	1	1	12	6	+6	7	Tournament Champion
2	Germany	4	2	1	1	10	7	+3	7	
3	Belgium	4	2	1	1	9	9	0	7	
4	England	4	1	1	2	8	12	−4	4	
5	India	4	1	0	3	5	10	−5	3	

Source: FIH
Rules for classification: 1) points; 2) goal difference; 3) games won; 4) head-to-head result.
(C) Champions; (H) Hosts

=== Fixtures ===
24 October 2016
16:00

England	3–0	India
Sanders 22'; Crowson 34', 43'	Report

Umpires:
Ivona Makar (CRO)
Anne van den Bosch (BEL)

25 October 2016
17:00

Germany	5–2	Belgium
Gräve 4'; Ziehm 8', 13'; Gablać 17'; Meffert 28'	Report	Ronquetti 30'; Gose 66'

Umpires:
Ayanna McClean (TTO)
Rama Potnis (IND)

25 October 2016
19:00

India	3–2	Spain
Jyoti 28'; Ritu 42'; Sangita 62'	Report	Ycart 15', 44'

Umpires:
Angelika Koppen (GER)
Emma Shelbourn (ENG)

26 October 2016
15:00

England	2–3	Belgium
Calnan 4'; Crowson 62'	Report	Peeters 14'; Vanden Borre 16', 57'

Umpires:
Gema Calderón (ESP)
Angelika Koppen (GER)

27 October 2016
13:00

Spain	7–1	England
Gil 9'; Pampín 20'; Serrahima 23'; Arrazola 38'; García 41'; Iglesias 68'; Segú 69'	Report	Caillard 6'

Umpires:
Ayanna McClean (TTO)
Anne van den Bosch (BEL)

27 October 2016
15:00

India	1–2	Germany
Gupta 35'	Report	Gräve 25'; Meffert 58'

Umpires:
Gema Calderón (ESP)
Emma Shelbourn (ENG)

28 October 2016
18:00

Belgium	1–1	Spain
Struijk 22'	Report	Gil 64'

Umpires:
Ivona Makar (CRO)
Rama Potnis (IND)

29 October 2016
11:00

Germany	2–2	England
Heyn 11'; Gablać 16'	Report	Sanders 4'; Hunt 66'

Umpires:
Gema Calderón (ESP)
Ivona Makar (CRO)

29 October 2016
17:00

Belgium	3–1	India
Peeters 24'; Ikegwuonu 35'; Hillewaert 57'	Report	Sangita 64'

Umpires:
Emma Shelbourn (ENG)
Angelika Koppen (GER)

30 October 2016
12:00

Spain	2–1	Germany
Mejías 9'; García 54'	Report	Granitzki 7'

Umpires:
Anne van den Bosch (BEL)
Ayanna McClean (TTO)
