= 2016 Women's Hockey Junior World Cup =

Field hockey competition

Junior Hockey World Cup 2016

Tournament details
- Host country: Chile
- City: Santiago
- Dates: 24 November – 4 December 2016
- Teams: 16 (from 5 confederations)
- Venue: Club Deportivo Manquehue

Final positions
- Champions: Argentina (2nd title)
- Runner-up: Netherlands
- Third place: Australia

Tournament statistics
- Matches played: 44
- Goals scored: 232 (5.27 per match)
- Top scorer: (Netherlands) Frédérique Matla (12 goals)
- Best player: (Argentina) María Granatto
- Best goalkeeper: (Australia) Aleisha Power

The 2016 Women's Hockey Junior World Cup was the 8th edition of the Women's Hockey Junior World Cup. It was held from 24 November to 4 December 2016 in Santiago, Chile.

Argentina won the tournament after defeating defending champions the Netherlands 4–2 in the final. This was the first time Argentina had won the Junior World Cup since the 1993 tournament in Terrassa, Spain.

Australia won the third place match by defeating Spain 3–1 in a penalty shootout after a 1–1 draw. This was Australia's first Junior World Cup medal in 15 years.

== Qualification ==
Each continental federation received a number of quotas depending on the FIH World Rankings for teams qualified through their junior continental championships. Alongside the host nation, 16 teams competed in the tournament.

| Dates | Event | Location | Qualifier(s) |
|---|---|---|---|
| Host nation | | | Chile |
| 20–26 July 2014 | 2014 EuroHockey Junior Nations Championships | Waterloo, Belgium | Belgium; England; France; Germany; Netherlands; Spain |
| 5–13 September 2015 | 2015 Junior Asia Cup | Changzhou, China | China; South Korea; Japan |
| 18–24 January 2016 | 2016 Junior Oceania Cup | Gold Coast, Australia | Australia; New Zealand |
| 18–28 March 2016 | 2016 Junior Africa Cup | Windhoek, Namibia | South Africa; Zimbabwe |
| 20–29 March 2016 | 2016 Junior Pan American Championship | Tacarigua, Trinidad and Tobago | Argentina; United States |

== First round ==
All times are Chile Time (UTC−03:00)

=== Pool A ===
| Pos | Team | Pld | W | D | L | GF | GA | GD | Pts | Qualification |
|---|---|---|---|---|---|---|---|---|---|---|
| 1 | Netherlands | 3 | 3 | 0 | 0 | 28 | 3 | +25 | 9 | Advance to Quarterfinals |
| 2 | United States | 3 | 2 | 0 | 1 | 14 | 7 | +7 | 6 | Advance to Quarterfinals |
| 3 | South Korea | 3 | 1 | 0 | 2 | 10 | 13 | −3 | 3 | 9th to 12th place classification |
| 4 | Zimbabwe | 3 | 0 | 0 | 3 | 0 | 29 | −29 | 0 | 13th to 16th place classification |

Source: FIH
Rules for classification: 1) points; 2) goal difference; 3) goals scored; 4) head-to-head result.

24 November 2016
14:00

| United States | 10–0 | Zimbabwe |
|---|---|---|
| Hoffman 8', 34'; Magadan 14'; Matson 21', 27'; Major 22'; Woods 25', 57'; Paolino 47'; Gonzales 63' | Report |

Club Deportivo Manquehue
Umpires:
Catalina Montesino Wenzel
Jung Hee Kim

24 November 2016
16:00

| Netherlands | 10–2 | South Korea |
|---|---|---|
| Burg 1'; Matla 3', 26', 41'; Van der Plas 7', 13', 49'; Fillet 8'; Roosen 40'; Sanders 64' | Report | Kim Se. 23'; Moon 51' |

Club Deportivo Manquehue
Umpires:
Sarah Wilson
Karen Bennett

25 November 2016
18:00

| South Korea | 6–0 | Zimbabwe |
|---|---|---|
| Moon 5', 68'; Kim Se. 10'; Kim Mi. 20', 66'; Cho H. 70' | Report |

Club Deportivo Manquehue
Umpires:
Ana Faias
Miskarmalia Ariffin

25 November 2016
20:00

| United States | 1–5 | Netherlands |
|---|---|---|
| Caro 3' | Report | Van der Hoek 17'; Kappelle 32', 59'; Leemans 34'; Sanders 54' |

Club Deportivo Manquehue
Umpires:
Wanri Venter
Alison Keogh

27 November 2016
12:00

| Netherlands | 13–0 | Zimbabwe |
|---|---|---|
| Adegeest 13'; Van der Plas 17'; Matla 18', 31', 51', 54', 68'; Fortuin 20', 35'; Roosen 22'; Van der Hoek 24'; Kerstholt 26'; Krekelaar 70' | Report |

Club Deportivo Manquehue
Umpires:
Michelle Meister
Ana Faias

27 November 2016
14:00

| South Korea | 2–3 | United States |
|---|---|---|
| Kim Se. 2'; Cho H. 68' | Report | Paolino 18'; Matson 33'; Moyer 58' |

Club Deportivo Manquehue
Umpires:
Xiaoying Liu
Hannah Harrison

=== Pool B ===
| Pos | Team | Pld | W | D | L | GF | GA | GD | Pts | Qualification |
|---|---|---|---|---|---|---|---|---|---|---|
| 1 | Argentina | 3 | 3 | 0 | 0 | 15 | 2 | +13 | 9 | Advance to Quarterfinals |
| 2 | Germany | 3 | 2 | 0 | 1 | 13 | 5 | +8 | 6 | Advance to Quarterfinals |
| 3 | Japan | 3 | 0 | 1 | 2 | 1 | 5 | −4 | 1 | 9th to 12th place classification |
| 4 | France | 3 | 0 | 1 | 2 | 1 | 18 | −17 | 1 | 13th to 16th place classification |

Source: FIH
Rules for classification: 1) points; 2) goal difference; 3) goals scored; 4) head-to-head result.

25 November 2016
10:00

| Germany | 10–1 | France |
|---|---|---|
| Horn 2', 69'; Ziehm 6'; Granitzki 14', 22'; Marquardt 17'; Vivot 30'; Gablać 40', 61'; Schaunig 64' | Report | Delannoy 32' |

Club Deportivo Manquehue
Umpires:
Catalina Montesino Wenzel
Suzi Sutton

25 November 2016
12:00

| Argentina | 3–1 | Japan |
|---|---|---|
| von der Heyde 22'; Ortiz 41'; Gorzelany 57' | Report | Kawamura 52' |

Club Deportivo Manquehue
Umpires:
Clare Druijts
Xiaoying Liu

26 November 2016
12:00

| France | 0–0 | Japan |
|---|---|---|
| | Report |

Club Deportivo Manquehue
Umpires:
Michelle Meister
Wanri Venter

26 November 2016
16:00

| Germany | 1–4 | Argentina |
|---|---|---|
| Huse 59' | Report | Jankunas 17'; Granatto 24', 35' von der Heyde 46' |

Club Deportivo Manquehue
Umpires:
Sarah Wilson
Ana Faias

28 November 2016
16:00

| Japan | 0–2 | Germany |
|---|---|---|
| | Report | Huse 26'; Martin-Pelegrina 34' |

Club Deportivo Manquehue
Umpires:
Jung Hee Kim
Suzi Sutton

28 November 2016
18:00

| Argentina | 8–0 | France |
|---|---|---|
| Trinchinetti 38'; Jankunas 44', 53', 54'; Granatto 52', 65'; Sanguinetti 61'; Toccalino 62' | Report |

Club Deportivo Manquehue
Umpires:
Hannah Harrison
Miskarmalia Ariffin

=== Pool C ===
| Pos | Team | Pld | W | D | L | GF | GA | GD | Pts | Qualification |
|---|---|---|---|---|---|---|---|---|---|---|
| 1 | Australia | 3 | 2 | 1 | 0 | 10 | 2 | +8 | 7 | Advance to Quarterfinals |
| 2 | England | 3 | 1 | 2 | 0 | 5 | 4 | +1 | 5 | Advance to Quarterfinals |
| 3 | Chile | 3 | 1 | 0 | 2 | 3 | 4 | −1 | 3 | 9th to 12th place classification |
| 4 | South Africa | 3 | 0 | 1 | 2 | 4 | 12 | −8 | 1 | 13th to 16th place classification |

Source: FIH
Rules for classification: 1) points; 2) goal difference; 3) goals scored; 4) head-to-head result.

24 November 2016
18:00

| Australia | 7–0 | South Africa |
|---|---|---|
| Hanna 6'; S. Fitzpatrick 25'; Spano 28'; Stewart 31'; Hayes 38'; S. Taylor 49', 59' | Report |

Club Deportivo Manquehue
Umpires:
Michelle Meister
Hannah Harrison

24 November 2016
20:00

| England | 1–0 | Chile |
|---|---|---|
| Burge 18' | Report |

Club Deportivo Manquehue
Umpires:
Miskarmalia Ariffin
Aleisha Neumann

26 November 2016
14:00

| England | 1–1 | Australia |
|---|---|---|
| Sanders 4' | Report | R. Taylor 43' |

Club Deportivo Manquehue
Umpires:
Alison Keogh
Suzi Sutton

26 November 2016
18:00

| South Africa | 1–2 | Chile |
|---|---|---|
| Davids 51' | Report | Villagrán 5'; Machado 54' |

Club Deportivo Manquehue
Umpires:
Jung Hee Kim
Clare Druijts

28 November 2016
14:00

| South Africa | 3–3 | England |
|---|---|---|
| Esteves 35'; Small 52', 60' | Report | Hunt 6'; Munro 28'; Crowson 41' |

Club Deportivo Manquehue
Umpires:
Catalina Montesino Wenzel
Sarah Wilson

28 November 2016
20:00

| Australia | 2–1 | Chile |
|---|---|---|
| R. Taylor 6'; Williams 55' | Report | Krimerman 22' |

Club Deportivo Manquehue
Umpires:
Michelle Meister
Xiaoying Liu

=== Pool D ===
| Pos | Team | Pld | W | D | L | GF | GA | GD | Pts | Qualification |
|---|---|---|---|---|---|---|---|---|---|---|
| 1 | Spain | 3 | 2 | 1 | 0 | 12 | 4 | +8 | 7 | Advance to Quarterfinals |
| 2 | Belgium | 3 | 1 | 1 | 1 | 4 | 7 | −3 | 4 | Advance to Quarterfinals |
| 3 | China | 3 | 0 | 3 | 0 | 8 | 8 | 0 | 3 | 9th to 12th place classification |
| 4 | New Zealand | 3 | 0 | 1 | 2 | 3 | 8 | −5 | 1 | 13th to 16th place classification |

Source: FIH
Rules for classification: 1) points; 2) goal difference; 3) goals scored; 4) head-to-head result.

24 November 2016
10:00

| China | 4–4 | Spain |
|---|---|---|
| Zhang 13'; Ou 19', 32'; Guo 69' | Report | F. Amundson 7'; Gil 56', 57'; Iglesias 70' |

Club Deportivo Manquehue
Umpires:
Alison Keogh
Clare Druijts

24 November 2016
12:00

| New Zealand | 1–2 | Belgium |
|---|---|---|
| Dickins 7' | Report | Hillewaert 26', 29' |

Club Deportivo Manquehue
Umpires:
Suzi Sutton
Xiaoying Liu

25 November 2016
14:00

| Belgium | 0–4 | Spain |
|---|---|---|
| | Report | Serrahima 23', 61'; Iglesias 48'; Segú 63' |

Club Deportivo Manquehue
Umpires:
Karen Bennett
Jung Hee Kim

25 November 2016
16:00

| China | 2–2 | New Zealand |
|---|---|---|
| Zhang 25'; Zhong M. 36' | Report | Hull 58', 62' |

Club Deportivo Manquehue
Umpires:
Hannah Harrison
Aleisha Neumann

27 November 2016
16:00

| Belgium | 2–2 | China |
|---|---|---|
| Ronquetti 68'; Vanden Borre 70' | Report | Guo 3'; Zhong M. 42' |

Club Deportivo Manquehue
Umpires:
Aleisha Neumann
Karen Bennett

27 November 2016
18:00

| New Zealand | 0–4 | Spain |
|---|---|---|
| | Report | Jiménez 5', 35'; Pampín 45'; Segú 48' |

Club Deportivo Manquehue
Umpires:
Sarah Wilson
Wanri Venter

== Classification round ==
=== Thirteenth to sixteenth place classification ===
Cross-overs
1 December
Zimbabwe | 0
New Zealand | 16
1 December
France | 0 (1)
South Africa (s.o) | 0 (3)

Thirteenth Place
3 December
New Zealand | 8
South Africa | 2
Fifteenth Place
3 December
Zimbabwe | 1
France | 3

==== Cross-overs ====
1 December 2016
13:15

| Zimbabwe | 0–16 | New Zealand |
|---|---|---|
| | Report | Reed 11', 66'; Ritchie 13', 62'; Jaques 15', 51', 53'; Steel 19', 46', 66', 70'; Hull 23', 69'; Dickins 26', 42'; Davey 30' |

Club Deportivo Manquehue
Umpires:
Alison Keogh
Aleisha Neumann

1 December 2016
15:30

| France | 0–0 | South Africa |
|---|---|---|
| | Report |
Penalties
| Ponthieu (penalty shoot-out scored); Delannoy (penalty shoot-out missed); Lhopital (penalty shoot-out missed); Vankemmel (penalty shoot-out missed) | 1–3 | (penalty shoot-out scored) Esteves; (penalty shoot-out scored) Cairns; (penalty shoot-out scored) Fourie; (penalty shoot-out missed) Glasby |

Club Deportivo Manquehue
Umpires:
Miskarmalia Ariffin
Ana Faias

==== Fifteenth and sixteenth place ====
3 December 2016
11:45

| Zimbabwe | 1–3 | France |
|---|---|---|
| Groenewald 26' | Report | Vankemmel 12', 58'; Roque 61' |

Club Deportivo Manquehue
Umpires:
Miskarmalia Ariffin
Catalina Montesino Wenzel

==== Thirteenth and fourteenth place ====
3 December 2016
14:00

| New Zealand | 8–2 | South Africa |
|---|---|---|
| Hull 10'; Ritchie 20', 31'; Davey 35'; Reed 43'; Wium 53'; Jaques 55'; Tinning 69' | Report | Glasby 28'; Cairns 45' |

Club Deportivo Manquehue
Umpires:
Ana Faias
Clare Druijts

=== Ninth to twelfth place classification ===
Cross-overs
1 December
South Korea | 0
China | 1
1 December
Japan | 6
Chile | 1

Ninth Place
3 December
China | 0
Japan | 2
Eleventh Place
3 December
South Korea | 2 (1)
Chile (s.o) | 2 (3)

==== Cross-overs ====
1 December 2016
17:45

| South Korea | 0–1 | China |
|---|---|---|
| | Report | Tang 44' |

Umpires:
Catalina Montesino Wenzel (CHL)
Wanri Venter (RSA)

1 December 2016
20:00

| Japan | 6–1 | Chile |
|---|---|---|
| Nishimura 10'; Toriyama 23', 47'; Kawamura 28', 31'; Segawa 38' | Report | Villagrán 54' |

Umpires:
Michelle Meister (GER)
Suzi Sutton (USA)

==== Eleventh and twelfth place ====
3 December 2016
18:30

| South Korea | 2–2 | Chile |
|---|---|---|
| Moon 16'; Kim S. 40' | Report | Krimerman 8'; Machado 60' |
Penalties
| Kim S. (penalty shoot-out missed); Kang (penalty shoot-out scored); Cho H. (penalty shoot-out missed); Jung (penalty shoot-out missed) | 1–3 | (penalty shoot-out missed) Morales; (penalty shoot-out scored) Salas; (penalty shoot-out missed) De las Heras; (penalty shoot-out scored) D. Ananías; (penalty shoot-out scored) Krimerman |

Umpires:
Alison Keogh (IRE)
Karen Bennett (NZL)

==== Ninth and tenth place ====
3 December 2016
16:15

| China | 0–2 | Japan |
|---|---|---|
| | Report | Segawa 5'; Mori 21' |

Umpires:
Wanri Venter (RSA)
Suzi Sutton (USA)

== Medal round ==
=== Bracket ===
Quarter-finals
30 November
Netherlands | 5
Germany | 0
30 November
Spain | 5
England | 3
30 November
Argentina | 2
United States | 0
30 November
Australia | 7
Belgium | 2

Semi-finals
2 December
Netherlands | 4
Spain | 0
2 December
Argentina | 4
Australia | 2

Final
4 December
Netherlands | 2
Argentina | 4
Third place
4 December
Spain | 1 (1)
Australia (p.s.o) | 1 (3)

=== Quarter-finals ===
30 November 2016
13:15

| Netherlands | 5–0 | Germany |
|---|---|---|
| Burg 11'; Matla 23', 65'; Van der Plas 37'; Leemans 56' | Report |

Umpires:
Karen Bennett
Jung Hee Kim

30 November 2016
15:30

| Spain | 5–3 | England |
|---|---|---|
| García 15'; Iglesias 35', 47'; F. Amundson 46'; Serrahima 53' | Report | Sanders 24'; Crowson 58', 65' |

Umpires:
Aleisha Neumann
Wanri Venter

30 November 2016
17:45

| Argentina | 2–0 | United States |
|---|---|---|
| Donati 32' von der Heyde 49' | Report |

Umpires:
Alison Keogh
Xiaoying Liu

30 November 2016
20:00

| Australia | 7–2 | Belgium |
|---|---|---|
| Stewart 5', 51'; M. Fitzpatrick 29'; Malone 48', 70'; S. Fitzpatrick 64'; Spano 69' | Report | Hillewaert 3'; Peeters 30' |

Umpires:
Clare Druijts
Hannah Harrison

=== Fifth to eighth place classification ===
Cross-overs
2 December
Germany | 1
England | 0
2 December
United States | 1
Belgium | 2

Fifth place
4 December
Germany | 4
Belgium | 3
Seventh place
4 December
England | 3
United States | 1

==== Cross-overs ====
2 December 2016
13:15

| United States | 1–2 | Belgium |
|---|---|---|
| Matson 68' | Report | Gose 7'; Hillewaert 35' |

Umpires:
Karen Bennett
Hannah Harrison

2 December 2016
15:30

| Germany | 1–0 | England |
|---|---|---|
| Martin-Pelegrina 33' | Report |

Umpires:
Jung Hee Kim
Clare Druijts

==== Seventh and eighth place ====
4 December 2016
11:45

| England | 3–1 | United States |
|---|---|---|
| Burge 9'; Macdonell 41'; Daly 56' | Report | Matson 19' |

Umpires:
Aleisha Neumann
Wanri Venter

==== Fifth and sixth place ====
4 December 2016
14:00

| Germany | 4–3 | Belgium |
|---|---|---|
| Huse 8', 39', 57'; Marquardt 66' | Report | Vanden Borre 5'; Weicker 12'; Raymakers 55' |

Umpires:
Hannah Harrison
Alison Keogh

=== First to fourth place classification ===
==== Semi-finals ====
2 December 2016
17:45

| Argentina | 4–2 | Australia |
|---|---|---|
| Donati 4'; Sanguinetti 44'; Mi. Fernández 57'; Jankunas 70' | Report | Hayes 66'; Williams 69' |

Umpires:
Michelle Meister
Xiaoying Liu

2 December 2016
20:00

| Netherlands | 4–0 | Spain |
|---|---|---|
| van der Plas 11'; Matla 22', 68'; Kerstholt 58' | Report |

Umpires:
Sarah Wilson
Aleisha Neumann

==== Third and fourth place ====
4 December 2016
16:15

| Spain | 1–1 | Australia |
|---|---|---|
| F. Amundson 6' | Report | Gray 28' |
Penalties
| Ycart (penalty shoot-out missed); Garcia (penalty shoot-out scored); Iglesias (penalty shoot-out missed); Jiménez (penalty shoot-out missed) | 1–3 | (penalty shoot-out scored) Williams; (penalty shoot-out scored) Bates; (penalty shoot-out missed) Gray; (penalty shoot-out scored) Nobbs |

Club Deportivo Manquehue
Umpires:
Alison Keogh
Karen Bennett

==== Final ====
4 December 2016
18:30

| Netherlands | 2–4 | Argentina |
|---|---|---|
| van der Hoek 19'; Sanders 50' | Report | Donati 27'; Borgia 35'; Ortíz 43'; Gorzelany 70' |

Club Deportivo Manquehue
Umpires:
Xiaoying Liu
Michelle Meister

== Awards ==
| Top Goalscorer | Player of the Tournament | Goalkeeper of the Tournament |
|---|---|---|
| (Netherlands) Frédérique Matla | (Argentina) María Granatto | (Australia) Aleisha Power |

== Statistics ==
=== Final rankings ===
As per statistical convention in field hockey, matches decided in extra time are counted as wins and losses, while matches decided by penalty shoot-outs are counted as draws.

| Pos | Team | Pld | W | D | L | GF | GA | GD | Pts | Final standings |
|---|---|---|---|---|---|---|---|---|---|---|
| 1st place, gold medalist(s) | Argentina | 6 | 6 | 0 | 0 | 25 | 6 | +19 | 18 | Gold Medal |
| 2nd place, silver medalist(s) | Netherlands | 6 | 5 | 0 | 1 | 39 | 7 | +32 | 15 | Silver Medal |
| 3rd place, bronze medalist(s) | Australia | 6 | 3 | 2 | 1 | 20 | 9 | +11 | 11 | Bronze Medal |
| 4 | Spain | 6 | 3 | 2 | 1 | 18 | 12 | +6 | 11 | Fourth place |
| 5 | Germany | 6 | 4 | 0 | 2 | 18 | 13 | +5 | 12 | Eliminated in quarterfinals |
| 6 | Belgium | 6 | 2 | 1 | 3 | 11 | 19 | −8 | 7 | Eliminated in quarterfinals |
| 7 | England | 6 | 2 | 2 | 2 | 11 | 11 | 0 | 8 | Eliminated in quarterfinals |
| 8 | United States | 6 | 2 | 0 | 4 | 16 | 14 | +2 | 6 | Eliminated in quarterfinals |
| 9 | Japan | 5 | 2 | 1 | 2 | 9 | 6 | +3 | 7 | Eliminated in pool stage |
| 10 | China | 5 | 1 | 3 | 1 | 9 | 10 | −1 | 6 | Eliminated in pool stage |
| 11 | Chile | 5 | 1 | 1 | 3 | 6 | 12 | −6 | 4 | Eliminated in pool stage |
| 12 | South Korea | 5 | 1 | 1 | 3 | 12 | 16 | −4 | 4 | Eliminated in pool stage |
| 13 | New Zealand | 5 | 2 | 1 | 2 | 27 | 10 | +17 | 7 | Eliminated in pool stage |
| 14 | South Africa | 5 | 0 | 2 | 3 | 6 | 20 | −14 | 2 | Eliminated in pool stage |
| 15 | France | 5 | 1 | 2 | 2 | 4 | 19 | −15 | 5 | Eliminated in pool stage |
| 16 | Zimbabwe | 5 | 0 | 0 | 5 | 1 | 48 | −47 | 0 | Eliminated in pool stage |

Source: FIH

=== Goalscorers ===
There were 232 goals scored in 48 matches, for an average of 4.83 goals per match.

12 goals

- (Netherlands) Frédérique Matla

6 goals

- (Netherlands) Pleun van der Plas

5 goals

- (Argentina) Julieta Jankunas
- (Germany) Viktoria Huse
- (New Zealand) Megan Hull
- (United States) Erin Matson

4 goals

- (Argentina) María Granatto
- (Belgium) Lien Hillewaert
- (New Zealand) Alia Jaques
- (New Zealand) Deanna Ritchie
- (New Zealand) Phoebe Steel
- (South Korea) Kim Seo-Yeong
- (South Korea) Moon So-Yun
- (Spain) Belén Iglesias

3 goals

- (Argentina) Bianca Donati
- (Argentina) Lucina von der Heyde
- (Australia) Grace Stewart
- (England) Megan Crowson
- (Japan) Motomi Kawamura
- (Netherlands) Pien Sanders
- (Netherlands) Imme van der Hoek
- (New Zealand) Stephanie Dickins
- (New Zealand) Kayla Reed
- (Spain) Florencia Amundson
- (Spain) Mariona Serrahima

2 goals

- (Argentina) Agustina Gorzelany
- (Argentina) Paula Ortíz
- (Argentina) Lucía Sanguinetti
- (Australia) Savannah Fitzpatrick
- (Australia) Greta Hayes
- (Australia) Ambrosia Malone
- (Australia) Michaela Spano
- (Australia) Renee Taylor
- (Australia) Sophie Taylor
- (Australia) Mariah Williams
- (Belgium) Stéphanie Vanden Borre
- (Chile) Denise Krimerman
- (Chile) Sofía Machado
- (Chile) Fernanda Villagrán
- (China) Zhang Jinrong
- (China) Zhong Mengling
- (China) Guo Qiu
- (China) Ou Zixia
- (England) Esme Burge
- (England) Erica Sanders
- (France) Victorine Vankemmel
- (Germany) Hannah Gablać
- (Germany) Hanna Granitzki
- (Germany) Kira Horn
- (Germany) Maxi Marquardt
- (Germany) Teresa Martin-Pelegrina
- (Japan) Maho Segawa
- (Japan) Mai Toriyama
- (Netherlands) Joosje Burg
- (Netherlands) Kyra Fortuin
- (Netherlands) Ilse Kappelle
- (Netherlands) Maxime Kerstholt
- (Netherlands) Yentl Leemans
- (Netherlands) Fabienne Roosen
- (New Zealand) Tarryn Davey
- (South Africa) Donna Small
- (South Korea) Cho Hye-Jin
- (South Korea) Kim Min-Ji
- (Spain) Anna Gil
- (Spain) Lucía Jiménez
- (Spain) Marta Segú
- (United States) Ashley Hoffman
- (United States) Margaux Paolino
- (United States) Nicole Woods

1 goal

- (Argentina) Bárbara Borgia
- (Argentina) Milagros Fernández
- (Argentina) Sofía Toccalino
- (Argentina) Eugenia Trinchinetti
- (Australia) Madison Fitzpatrick
- (Australia) Laura Gray
- (Australia) Kate Hanna
- (Belgium) Daphné Gose
- (Belgium) Joanne Peeters
- (Belgium) Mathilde Raymakers
- (Belgium) Marie Ronquetti
- (Belgium) Alice Weicker
- (China) Tang Wanli
- (England) Charlotte Daly
- (England) Holly Hunt
- (England) Lydia MacDonell
- (England) Holly Munro
- (France) Marine Delannoy
- (France) Noa Roque
- (Germany) Maike Schaunig
- (Germany) Alisa Vivot
- (Germany) Annelotte Ziehm
- (Japan) Kanon Mori
- (Japan) Ayaka Nishimura
- (Netherlands) Charlotte Adegeest
- (Netherlands) Michelle Fillet
- (Netherlands) Maartje Krekelaar
- (New Zealand) Catherine Tinning
- (New Zealand) Emily Wium
- (South Africa) Danielle Cairns
- (South Africa) Gretchen Davids
- (South Africa) Natalie Esteves
- (South Africa) Tarryn Glasby
- (Spain) Begoña García
- (Spain) Lara Pampín
- (United States) Catherine Caro
- (United States) Linnea Gonzales
- (United States) Amanda Magadan
- (United States) Gabrielle Major
- (United States) Lauren Moyer
- (Zimbabwe) Tyla Groenewald

Source: FIH

== See also ==
- 2016 Men's Hockey Junior World Cup
