= 2018 Women's EuroHockey Indoor Championship II =

Tournament details
- Host country: Belgium
- City: Brussels
- Dates: 19–21 January 2018
- Teams: 8 (from 1 confederation)

Final positions
- Champions: Belgium (1st title)
- Runner-up: Austria
- Third place: England

Tournament statistics
- Matches played: 20
- Goals scored: 111 (5.55 per match)
- Top scorer: (Belgium) Laurine Delforge (8 goals)
- Best player: (Belgium) Laurine Delforge

The 2018 Women's EuroHockey Indoor Championship II was the 12th edition of the tournament. It was held from 19 to 21 January 2018 in Brussels, Belgium.

Belgium won the tournament for the first time after topping the pool. Along with Belgium, Austria qualified to the 2020 EuroHockey Indoor Nations Championship as the two highest ranked teams.

== Qualified Teams ==
The following teams, shown with pre-tournament world rankings, participated in the 2018 EuroHockey Indoor Championship II.

Dates	Event	Location	Quotas	Qualifier(s)
Host			1	Belgium (9)
22–24 January 2016	2016 EuroHockey Indoor Championship	Minsk, Belarus	1	Austria (6)
22–24 January 2016	2016 EuroHockey Indoor Championship II	Cambrai, France	5	Croatia (23); England (21); Lithuania (22); Scotland (16); Wales (24)
Invitational team			1	Sweden (28)
Total			8	

== Results ==
All times are local (UTC+1).

=== Preliminary round ===
==== Pool A ====
Pos	Team	Pld	W	D	L	GF	GA	GD	Pts	Qualification
1	Austria	3	3	0	0	15	5	+10	9	Advanced to Pool D
2	England	3	2	0	1	13	9	+4	6	Advanced to Pool D
3	Sweden	3	1	0	2	5	13	−8	3	Pool C
4	Lithuania	3	0	0	3	7	13	−6	0	Pool C

Source: FIH
Rules for classification: 1) points; 2) goal difference; 3) goals scored; 4) head-to-head result.

19 January 2018
10:00

England	5–1	Sweden
Sanders 10', 21', 32', 38'; Crowson 26'	Report	Fantini 20'

Umpires:
Fanneke ALkemade (NED)
Magali Sergeant (BEL)

19 January 2018
11:10

Austria	4–2	Lithuania
Sandner 2'; Buchta 21'; Zerbs 24'; Pulter 32'	Report	Juodyte 20+'; Kukliene 25'

Umpires:
Abby MacArthur (WAL)
Lena McCrae (SCO)

19 January 2018
16:00

Lithuania	2–4	Sweden
Nomeikaite 30'; Kukliene 25'	Report	Fantini 21', 23'; Hernvall 25'; Zulfiyeva 25'

Umpires:
Fanneke Alkemade (NED)
Cristina Pérez (ESP)

19 January 2018
17:10

England	3–5	Austria
Sanders 30'; MacDonell 32'; Wills 38'	Report	Podpera 13'; Buchta 14'; Hefter 16', 36'; Laginja 25'

Umpires:
Montserrat Solórzano (ESP)
Magali Sergeant (BEL)

20 January 2018
09:00

Austria	6–0	Sweden
Steyrer 11'; Zerbs 25'; Pulter 35'; Sandner 39', 40'; Buchta 40'	Report

Umpires:
Montserrat Solórzano (ESP)
Sophie Bockelmann (GER)

20 January 2018
10:10

Lithuania	3–5	England
Juriate 15'; Kartanovic 16'; Juodyte 36'	Report	Crowson 9', 26'; Burge 13', 22'; Sanders 18'

Umpires:
Claire Druijts (NED)
Abby MacArthur (WAL)

==== Pool B ====
Pos	Team	Pld	W	D	L	GF	GA	GD	Pts	Qualification
1	Belgium	3	3	0	0	16	0	+16	9	Advanced to Pool D
2	Croatia	3	1	1	1	6	5	+1	4	Advanced to Pool D
3	Scotland	3	1	1	1	6	6	0	4	Pool C
4	Wales	3	0	0	3	0	17	−17	0	Pool C

Source: FIH
Rules for classification: 1) points; 2) goal difference; 3) goals scored; 4) head-to-head result.

19 January 2018
12:20

Scotland	5–0	Wales
Dark 4', 5'; Campbell 21'; Bunce 23', 25'	Report

Umpires:
Rachel Williams (ENG)
Sophie Bockelmann (GER)

19 January 2018
13:30

Belgium	4–0	Croatia
Delforge 16', 23', 36'; Rasir 20'	Report

Umpires:
Claire Druijts (NED)
Kamile Mockaityte (LTU)

19 January 2018
18:20

Croatia	5–0	Wales
Franić 4'; Peranic 19', 26'; V. Šomin 33'; Litvic 40+'	Report

Umpires:
Lena McCrae (SCO)
Claire Druijts (NED)

19 January 2018
19:30

Scotland	0–5	Belgium
	Report	Rasir 13'; Ronquetti 18'; Delforge 31', 40'; Breyne 39'

Umpires:
Rachel Williams (ENG)
Abby MacArthur (WAL)

20 January 2018
11:20

Croatia	1–1	Scotland
A. Šomin 36'	Report	Bunce 24'

Umpires:
Magali Sergeant (BEL)
Rachel Williams (ENG)

20 January 2018
12:30

Belgium	7–0	Wales
Rasir 3'; Delforge 15', 36'; Englebert 17'; Ronquetti 23', 25'; Massart 27'	Report

Umpires:
Lena McCrae (SCO)
Kamile Mockaityte (LTU)

=== Classification round ===
==== Pool C ====
Pos	Team	Pld	W	D	L	GF	GA	GD	Pts
1	Lithuania	3	2	0	1	16	7	+9	6
2	Sweden	3	2	0	1	8	6	+2	6
3	Scotland	3	1	0	2	9	7	+2	3
4	Wales	3	1	0	2	3	16	−13	3

Source: FIH
Rules for classification: 1) points; 2) goal difference; 3) goals scored; 4) head-to-head result.

20 January 2018
16:30

Lithuania	9–0	Wales
Kartanovic 3'; Juodyte 4', 22', 26'; Kukliene 6', 15'; Caikauskaite 23'; Juraite 31'; Adomaviciute 32'	Report

Umpires:
Montserrat Solórzano (ESP)
Magali Sergeant (BEL)

20 January 2018
17:40

Sweden	2–1	Scotland
Fantini 11'; Moberg 31'	Report	Dark 36'

Umpires:
Cristina Pérez (ESP)
Sophie Bockelmann (GER)

21 January 2018
10:00

Scotland	3–5	Lithuania
Dark 5', 17'; Bunce 37'	Report	Chmeliauskaite 4', 12', 23'; Adomaviciute 10'; Nomeikaite 18'

Umpires:
Montserrat Solórzano (ESP)
Cristina Pérez (ESP)

21 January 2018
11:10

Sweden	2–3	Wales
Lindström 22', 38'	Report	Francis 7', 38'; Lewis-Williams 29'

Umpires:
Kamile Mockaityte (LTU)
Lena McCrae (SCO)

==== Pool D ====
Pos	Team	Pld	W	D	L	GF	GA	GD	Pts	Promotion
1	Belgium	3	3	0	0	10	0	+10	9	Promoted to 2020 Women's EuroHockey Indoor Championship
2	Austria	3	2	0	1	12	6	+6	6	Promoted to 2020 Women's EuroHockey Indoor Championship
3	England	3	1	0	2	7	9	−2	3	
4	Croatia	3	0	0	3	1	15	−14	0	

Source: FIH
Rules for classification: 1) points; 2) goal difference; 3) goals scored; 4) head-to-head result.

20 January 2018
18:50

England	4–1	Croatia
Crowson 4', 23', 39'; Sanders 20'	Report	V. Šomin 33'

Umpires:
Fanneke Alkemade (NED)
Kamile Mockaityte (LTU)

20 January 2018
20:00

Austria	0–3	Belgium
	Report	Delforge 22'; De Mot 24'; Rasir 32'

Umpires:
Claire Druijts (NED)
Rachel Williams (ENG)

21 January 2018
13:00

Belgium	3–0	England
Englebert 5'; Rasir 15', 39'	Report

Umpires:
Claire Druijts (NED)
Fanneke Alkemade (NED)

21 January 2018
14:10

Austria	7–0	Croatia
Zerbs 2'; Buchta 10', 14', 20', 29'; Steyrer 15', 17'	Report

Umpires:
Rachel Williams (ENG)
Abby MacArthur (WAL)

== Awards ==
Player of the Tournament	Top Goalscorer	Goalkeeper of the Tournament	Young Player of the Tournament
(Belgium) Laurine Delforge	(Belgium) Laurine Delforge	(Belgium) Elodie Picard	(Austria) Daria Buchta

== Statistics ==
=== Final standings ===
As per statistical convention in field hockey, matches decided in extra time are counted as wins and losses, while matches decided by penalty shoot-outs are counted as draws.

Pos	Team	Pld	W	D	L	GF	GA	GD	Pts	Status
1st place, gold medalist(s)	Belgium	5	5	0	0	22	0	+22	15	Promoted to 2020 Women's EuroHockey Indoor Championship
2nd place, silver medalist(s)	Austria	5	4	0	1	22	8	+14	12	Promoted to 2020 Women's EuroHockey Indoor Championship
3rd place, bronze medalist(s)	England	5	3	0	2	17	13	+4	9	
4	Croatia	5	1	1	3	7	16	−9	4	
5	Lithuania	5	2	0	3	21	16	+5	6	
6	Sweden	5	2	0	3	9	17	−8	6	
7	Scotland	5	1	1	3	10	13	−3	4	
8	Wales	5	1	0	4	3	28	−25	3	

Source: FIH

=== Goalscorers ===
There were 111 goals scored in 20 matches, for an average of 5.55 goals per match.

8 goals

- (Belgium) Laurine Delforge

7 goals

- (Austria) Daria Buchta
- (England) Erica Sanders

6 goals

- (Belgium) Justine Rasir
- (England) Megan Crowson

5 goals

- (Lithuania) Jurate Juodyte
- (Scotland) Emily Dark

4 goals

- (Lithuania) Dovile Kukliene
- (Scotland) Vikki Bunce
- (Sweden) Emilia Fantini

3 goals

- (Austria) Alexandra Sandner
- (Austria) Lisa Steyrer
- (Austria) Corinna Zerbs
- (Belgium) Marie Ronquetti
- (Lithuania) Ugne Chmeliauskaite

2 goals

- (Austria) Marianna Pulter
- (Austria) Katharina Hefter
- (Belgium) Charlotte Englebert
- (Croatia) Dolores Peranic
- (Croatia) Viktoria Šomin
- (England) Esme Burge
- (Lithuania) Sandra Adomaviciute
- (Lithuania) Dovile Juriate
- (Lithuania) Kotryna Kartanovic
- (Lithuania) Erlanda Nomeikaite
- (Sweden) Lena Lindström
- (Wales) Heather Francis

1 goal

- (Austria) Martina Laginja
- (Austria) Stefania Podpera
- (Belgium) Lucie Breyne
- (Belgium) France de Mot
- (Belgium) Emeline Massart
- (Croatia) Marijana Franić
- (Croatia) Una Litvic
- (Croatia) Anamarija Šomin
- (England) Lydia MacDonell
- (England) Alice Wills
- (Lithuania) Kotryna Caikauskaite
- (Scotland) Louise Campbell
- (Sweden) Christina Hernvall
- (Sweden) Klara Moberg
- (Sweden) Gunaj Zulfiyeva
- (Wales) Megan Lewis-Williams

Source: FIH
