= 2016 Women's Pan-Am Junior Championship =

Field hockey tournament

Women's Junior Pan-Am Championship

Tournament details
- Host country: Trinidad and Tobago
- City: Tacarigua
- Dates: 31 March – 9 April
- Teams: 8 (from 1 confederation)

Final positions
- Champions: Argentina (7th title)
- Runner-up: United States
- Third place: Chile

Tournament statistics
- Matches played: 24
- Goals scored: 161 (6.71 per match)
- Top scorer: (Argentina) María Granatto (13 goals)
- Best player: (Argentina) María Granatto
- Best goalkeeper: (Canada) Lauren Logush

The 2016 Women's Junior Pan-Am Championship was the 8th edition of the Women's Pan American Junior Championship. It was held from 31 March to 9 April 2016 in Tacarigua, Trinidad and Tobago.

The tournament served as a qualifier for the 2016 Women's Hockey Junior World Cup, held in Santiago, Chile in November/December 2016.

Argentina won the tournament for the 7th time, defeating the United States 6–0 in the final. Chile won the bronze medal by defeating Canada 3–0 in the third and fourth place playoff.

== Participating nations ==
Alongside the host nation, 7 teams competed in the tournament.

- Argentina
- Barbados
- Canada
- Chile
- Mexico
- Trinidad and Tobago
- Uruguay
- United States

== Results ==
=== First round ===
==== Pool A ====
Pos	Team	Pld	W	D	L	GF	GA	GD	Pts
1	Argentina	3	3	0	0	30	0	+30	9
2	Chile	3	2	0	1	9	11	−2	6
3	Uruguay	3	1	0	2	10	7	+3	3
4	Barbados	3	0	0	3	2	33	−31	0

Source: FIH
Rules for classification: 1) points; 2) goal difference; 3) goals scored; 4) head-to-head result.

31 March 2016
10:00

Argentina	3–0	Uruguay
Sanguinetti 13'; Gorzelany 22'; Toccalino 70'	Report

Umpires:
Elena Eskina (RUS)
Maggie Befort (USA)

31 March 2016
12:00

Chile	7–0	Barbados
Krimerman 9', 44', 67'; Villagran 22'; De las Heras 54'; Valdivia 65'; Ananías 69'	Report

Umpires:
Megan Robertson (CAN)
Natalia Lodeiro (URU)

2 April 2016
10:00

Uruguay	9–2	Barbados
Tatton 14'; Vega 29'; Amadeo 40'; Algorta 42', 53', 64'; Curci 55'; Domingo 66'; Diaz 68'	Report	Mayers 7'; Wilson 16'

Umpires:
Maria Locatelli (ARG)
Camila Cabargas (CHI)

2 April 2016
12:00

Chile	0–10	Argentina
	Report	Granatto 3', 22'; Jankunas 5', 46', 70'; Toccalino 15', 53'; Jardel 34', 50' von der Heyde 59'

Umpires:
Sarah Wilson (SCO)
Diana Fuentes Castelo (MEX)

3 April 2016
10:00

Argentina	17–0	Barbados
Ortíz 4'; Granatto 7', 9', 13', 21', 40', 43', 65'; Jardel 10', 18'; Toccalino 16', 25', 27'; Jankunas 23', 66'; Trinchinetti 29'; Ma. Fernández Ladra 47'	Report

Umpires:
Megan Robertson (CAN)
Diana Fuentes Castelo (MEX)

3 April 2016
12:00

Uruguay	1–2	Chile
Amadeo 4'	Report	Morales 22'; Krimerman 67'

Umpires:
Kecia Hosein (TTO)
Maggie Befort (USA)

==== Pool B ====
Pos	Team	Pld	W	D	L	GF	GA	GD	Pts
1	United States	3	3	0	0	24	1	+23	9
2	Canada	3	2	0	1	9	5	+4	6
3	Trinidad and Tobago (H)	3	1	0	2	4	14	−10	3
4	Mexico	3	0	0	3	0	17	−17	0

Source: FIH
Rules for classification: 1) points; 2) goal difference; 3) goals scored; 4) head-to-head result.
(H) Hosts

31 March 2016
14:00

Canada	4–0	Mexico
de Armond 26', 60', 64'; Stirling 56'	Report

Umpires:
Kecia Hosein (TTO)
Maria Locatelli (ARG)

31 March 2016
16:00

United States	10–0	Trinidad and Tobago
J. Tornetta 13'; Major 14', 28', 67'; Matson 15', 65'; Woods 29'; Vittese 43'; Hoffman 48'; Moyer 57'	Report

Umpires:
Sarah Wilson (SCO)
Camila Cabargas (CHI)

2 April 2016
14:00

Canada	1–5	United States
Woodcroft 18'	Report	Major 17', 33'; Hoffman 39'; Caro 56'; Vittese 66'

Umpires:
Elena Eskina (RUS)
Natalia Lodeiro (URU)

2 April 2016
16:00

Trinidad and Tobago	4–0	Mexico
Dey 5'; Abreu 9'; Govia 58'; Oton 67'	Report

Umpires:
Maggie Befort (USA)
Megan Robertson (CAN)

3 April 2016
14:00

United States	9–0	Mexico
Paolino 4'; Matson 6', 70+'; Major 20', 34'; Woods 38'; S. Tornetta 41'; Hoffman 43', 61'	Report

Umpires:
Natalia Lodeiro (URU)
Camila Cabargas (CHI)

3 April 2016
16:00

Trinidad and Tobago	0–4	Canada
	Report	Pereira 9'; Cole 26'; Cookson 40' de Armond 51'

Umpires:
Sarah Wilson (SCO)
Maria Locatelli (ARG)

=== Second round ===
Fifth place
Uruguay	9
Trinidad & Tobago	1
Seventh place
Mexico (p.s.o)	1 (4)
Barbados	1 (3)

Consolation semifinals
Mexico	0 (1)
Uruguay (p.s.o)	0 (3)
Trinidad & Tobago	3
Barbados	1

Quarterfinals
Argentina	18
Mexico	0
Canada (p.s.o)	0 (5)
Uruguay	0 (3)
Chile	5
Trinidad & Tobago	0
United States	11
Barbados	0

Semifinals
Argentina	9
Canada	0
Chile	0
United States	5

Final
Argentina	6
United States	0
Third place
Canada	0
Chile	3

==== Quarterfinals ====
5 April 2016
09:15

Argentina	18–0	Mexico
Sanguinetti 1', 32', 43'; Jankunas 8', 42'; Granatto 12', 34', 60'; Toccalino 17', 53'; Jardel 18', 69'; Ma. Fernández Ladra 22'; Trinchinetti 39'; Mi. Fernández Ladra 51', 70'; Gorzelany 62' von der Heyde 66'	Report

Umpires:
Megan Robertson (CAN)
Camila Cabargas (CHL)

5 April 2016
11:30

Canada	0–0	Uruguay
	Report
Penalties
Pham (penalty shoot-out scored); Cookson (penalty shoot-out scored); Woodcroft (penalty shoot-out scored); Stirling (penalty shoot-out scored); Randhawa (penalty shoot-out scored)	5–3	(penalty shoot-out scored) Agazzi; (penalty shoot-out missed) Castro; (penalty shoot-out scored) Algorta; (penalty shoot-out scored) Petrik Vidal

Umpires:
Sarah Wilson (SCO)
Maggie Befort (USA)

5 April 2016
13:45

Chile	5–0	Trinidad and Tobago
Krimerman 3', 18', 40'; De las Heras 56'; Salas 58'	Report

Umpires:
Elena Eskina (RUS)
Diana Fuentes Castelo (MEX)

5 April 2016
16:00

United States	11–0	Barbados
Paolino 9'; Magadan 11', 29'; Major 13'; Woods 9', 50'; Tornetta 22'; Matson 25', 52'; Hurff 62'; Vittese 63'	Report

Umpires:
Natalia Lodeiro (URU)
Kecia Hosein (TTO)

==== Fifth to eighth place classification ====
===== Crossover =====
7 April 2016
09:15

Mexico	0–0	Uruguay
	Report
Penalties
	1–3

Umpires:
Camila Cabargas (CHL)
Kecia Hosein (TTO)

7 April 2016
11:30

Trinidad and Tobago	3–1	Barbados
	Report

Umpires:
Diana Fuentes Castelo (MEX)
Maggie Befort (USA)

===== Seventh and eighth place =====
9 April 2016
09:15

Mexico	1–1	Barbados
	Report
Penalties
	4–3

Umpires:
Maggie Befort (USA)
Sarah Wilson (SCO)

===== Fifth and sixth place =====
9 April 2016
11:30

Uruguay	9–1	Trinidad and Tobago
Domingo 9'; Amadeo 14', 21', 38', 48'; Ingold 15'; Algorta 43'; Curci 61'; Castro 68'	Report	Govia 57'

Umpires:
Diana Fuentes Castelo (MEX)
Sarah Wilson (SCO)

==== First to fourth place classification ====
===== Semi-finals =====
7 April 2016
13:45

Argentina	9–0	Canada
Ortiz 8', 51'; Trinchinetti 9', 38'; Jankunas 26', 34'; Gorzelany 43'; Sanguinetti 52'; Granatto 55'	Report

Umpires:
Natalia Lodeiro (URU)
Elena Eskina (RUS)

7 April 2016
16:00

Chile	0–5	United States
	Report	Paolino 18'; Matson 22', 65'; Moyer 42'; Hoffman 44'

Umpires:
Sarah Wilson (SCO)
Megan Robertson (CAN)

===== Third and fourth place =====
9 April 2016
13:45

Canada	0–3	Chile
	Report	Machado 26'; Jacob 31'; Valdivia 34'

Umpires:
Elena Eskina (RUS)
Kecia Hosein (TTO)

===== Final =====
9 April 2016
16:00

Argentina	6–0	United States
Sanguinetti 9'; Trinchinetti 39'; Mi. Fernández Ladra 50', 57'; Alonso 54'; Jankunas 62'	Report

Umpires:
Natalia Lodeiro (URU)
Megan Robertson (CAN)

== Statistics ==
=== Final standings ===
1. Argentina
2. United States
3. Chile
4. Canada
5. Uruguay
6. Trinidad and Tobago
7. Mexico
8. Barbados

=== Awards ===
Top Goalscorer	Player of the Tournament	Goalkeeper of the Tournament
(Argentina) María José Granatto	(Argentina) María José Granatto	(Canada) Lauren Logush

=== Goalscorers ===
There were 161 goals scored in 24 matches, for an average of 6.71 goals per match.

13 goals

- (Argentina) María José Granatto

10 goals

- (Argentina) Julieta Jankunas

8 goals

- (Argentina) Sofia Toccalino
- (United States) Gabrielle Major
- (United States) Erin Matson

7 goals

- (Chile) Denise Krimerman

6 goals

- (Argentina) Priscila Jardel
- (Argentina) Lucia Sanguinetti
- (Uruguay) Sol Amadeo

5 goals

- (Argentina) Eugenia Trinchinetti
- (United States) Ashley Hoffman

4 goals

- (Argentina) Milagros Fernández Ladra
- (Canada) Alexis de Armond
- (United States) Nicole Woods
- (Uruguay) Milagros Algorta

3 goals

- (Argentina) Agustina Gorzelany
- (Argentina) Maria Ortíz
- (Barbados) Ayanna Wilson
- (Trinidad and Tobago) Brianna Govia
- (United States) Margaux Paolino
- (United States) Tara Vittese

2 goals

- (Argentina) Magdalena Fernández Ladra
- (Argentina) Lucina von der Heyde
- (Chile) Consuelo de las Heras
- (Chile) Paula Valdivia
- (Trinidad and Tobago) Kristin Abreu
- (United States) Amanda Magadan
- (United States) Lauren Moyer
- (United States) Sophia Tornetta
- (Uruguay) Josefina Curci
- (Uruguay) Agustina Domingo

1 goal

- (Argentina) Agostina Alonso
- (Barbados) Krysten Mayers
- (Canada) Lindsay Cole
- (Canada) Ellis Cookson
- (Canada) Shannon Pereira
- (Canada) Jaslan Stirling
- (Canada) Nikki Woodcroft
- (Chile) Domenica Ananias
- (Chile) Kim Jacob
- (Chile) Sofia Machado
- (Chile) Antonia Morales
- (Chile) Josefa Salas
- (Chile) Fernanda Villagran
- (Mexico) Fernanda Oviedo
- (Trinidad and Tobago) Savannah de Freitas
- (Trinidad and Tobago) Chelsea Dey
- (Trinidad and Tobago) Saarah Olton
- (United States) Catherine Caro
- (United States) Laura Hurff
- (United States) Julianna Tornetta
- (Uruguay) Lucia Castro
- (Uruguay) Natalia Diaz
- (Uruguay) Camila Ingold
- (Uruguay) Sophie Tatton
- (Uruguay) Carolina Vega
