= 2013 Women's Under-18 Australian Hockey Championships =

2013 Women's Under–18 Australian Hockey Championships
Tournament details
- Host country: Australia
- City: Canberra
- Dates: 2–13 July
- Teams: 8
- Venue(s): National Hockey Centre

Final positions
- Champions: (New South Wales) NSW
- Runner-up: (Queensland) QLD
- Third place: (Western Australia) WA

Tournament statistics
- Matches played: 36
- Goals scored: 122 (3.39 per match)
- Best player: (Australian Capital Territory) Tamika Bostock

The 2013 Women's Under–18 Australian Hockey Championship was a field hockey competition organised by Hockey Australia. The tournament was held at the National Hockey Centre in Canberra, from 2–13 July 2013.

NSW won the tournament, defeating QLD in the final. WA finished in third place following a 2–0 victory over the ACT.

== Competition format ==
The tournament followed a single round-robin format, with each team playing each other once during the pool stage. The top four ranked teams qualified for the semi-finals, while the bottom four teams progressed to the classification round.

== Teams ==
- (Australian Capital Territory) ACT
- (New South Wales) NSW
- (Northern Territory) NT
- (Queensland) QLD
- (South Australia) SA
- (Tasmania) TAS
- (Victoria (state)) VIC
- (Western Australia) WA

== Results ==
All times are local (AEST).

=== Preliminary round ===
Pos	Team	Pld	W	D	L	GF	GA	GD	Pts	Qualification
1	(New South Wales) NSW	7	6	1	0	28	6	+22	19	Advanced to Semi-finals
2	(Queensland) QLD	7	6	1	0	22	7	+15	19	Advanced to Semi-finals
3	(Western Australia) WA	7	3	2	2	11	9	+2	11	Advanced to Semi-finals
4	(Australian Capital Territory) ACT	7	2	3	2	11	12	−1	9	Advanced to Semi-finals
5	(Victoria (state)) VIC	7	1	4	2	12	16	−4	7	
6	(Tasmania) TAS	7	1	2	4	7	15	−8	5	
7	(South Australia) SA	7	0	3	4	4	11	−7	3	
8	(Northern Territory) NT	7	0	2	5	4	23	−19	2	

Source: Hockey Australia
Rules for classification: 1) points; 2) matches won; 3) goal difference; 4) goals for; 5) head-to-head result; 6) field goals scored.

==== Fixtures ====
2 July 2013
09:00

VIC (Victoria (state))	3–0	(Northern Territory) NT
	Report

Umpires:
Deborah O'Connell (AUS)
Emily Nunn (AUS)

2 July 2013
11:00

ACT (Australian Capital Territory)	2–1	(South Australia) SA
	Report

Umpires:
Caroline Davis (AUS)
Kerryl Chandler (AUS)

2 July 2013
13:00

WA (Western Australia)	1–2	(Queensland) QLD
	Report

Umpires:
Alycia Amundson (AUS)
Keeley O'Reilly (AUS)

2 July 2013
15:00

NSW (New South Wales)	3–0	(Tasmania) TAS
	Report

Umpires:
Leonie Young (AUS)
Claire Butcher (AUS)

3 July 2013
09:00

WA (Western Australia)	1–1	(Victoria (state)) VIC
	Report

Umpires:
Kelby Pointon (AUS)
Caroline Davis (AUS)

3 July 2013
11:00

QLD (Queensland)	2–0	(Australian Capital Territory) ACT
	Report

Umpires:
Emily Nunn (AUS)
Brydie Welham (AUS)

3 July 2013
13:00

TAS (Tasmania)	1–1	(South Australia) SA
	Report

Umpires:
Kerryl Chandler (AUS)
Deborah O'Connell (AUS)

3 July 2013
15:00

NT (Northern Territory)	0–8	(New South Wales) NSW
	Report

Umpires:
Keeley O'Reilly (AUS)
Leonie Young (AUS)

4 July 2013
09:00

QLD (Queensland)	5–1	(Tasmania) TAS
	Report

Umpires:
Brydie Welham (AUS)
Kelby Pointon (AUS)

4 July 2013
11:00

ACT (Australian Capital Territory)	2–2	(Victoria (state)) VIC
	Report

Umpires:
Caroline Davis (AUS)
Deborah O'Connell (AUS)

4 July 2013
13:00

NSW (New South Wales)	4–1	(Western Australia) WA
	Report

Umpires:
Claire Butcher (AUS)
Kerryl Chandler (AUS)

4 July 2013
15:00

SA (South Australia)	1–1	(Northern Territory) NT
	Report

Umpires:
Emily Nunn (AUS)
Alycia Amundson (AUS)

6 July 2013
09:00

NSW (New South Wales)	3–1	(South Australia) SA
Hanna 13'; Divall 63'; Hughes 65'	Report	Baird 23'

Umpires:
Emily Nunn (AUS)
Keeley O'Reilly (AUS)

6 July 2013
11:00

VIC (Victoria (state))	3–5	(Queensland) QLD
Brennan 11'; *Remaining scorers unknown.	Report	S. Fitzpatrick 10'; *Remaining scorers unknown.

Umpires:
Kelby Pointon (AUS)
Brydie Welham (AUS)

6 July 2013
13:00

ACT (Australian Capital Territory)	1–1	(Western Australia) WA
Gray 28'	Report	McNess 53'

Umpires:
Alycia Amundson (AUS)
Leonie Young (AUS)

6 July 2013
15:00

NT (Northern Territory)	0–1	(Tasmania) TAS
	Report	Chesterman 51'

Umpires:
Caroline Davis (AUS)
Kerryl Chandler (AUS)

7 July 2013
09:00

QLD (Queensland)	2–2	(New South Wales) NSW
Smith 33'; Taylor 56'	Report	Constable 5'; 54'

Umpires:
Brydie Welham (AUS)
Kelby Pointon (AUS)

7 July 2013
11:00

SA (South Australia)	0–0	(Victoria (state)) VIC
	Report

Umpires:
Claire Butcher (AUS)
Deborah O'Connell (AUS)

7 July 2013
13:00

NT (Northern Territory)	3–3	(Australian Capital Territory) ACT
G. Graf 1', 58'; Paul 45'	Report	Monfries 4', 32'; Bostock 44'

Umpires:
Alycia Amundson (AUS)
Caroline Davis (AUS)

7 July 2013
15:00

TAS (Tasmania)	1–2	(Western Australia) WA
Chesterman 50'	Report	Wilson 2'; Peacock 31'

Umpires:
Keeley O'Reilly (AUS)
Claire Butcher (AUS)

9 July 2013
09:00

TAS (Tasmania)	1–2	(Australian Capital Territory) ACT
Hinton 16'	Report	Evans 28'; Toole 49'

Umpires:
Deborah O'Connell (AUS)
Leonie Young (AUS)

9 July 2013
11:00

WA (Western Australia)	4–0	(Northern Territory) NT
Johnson 37'; Fernandes 47'; Burvill 58'; Capewell 64'	Report

Umpires:
Kerryl Chandler (AUS)
Emily Nunn (AUS)

9 July 2013
13:00

SA (South Australia)	0–3	(Queensland) QLD
	Report	Kershaw 41'; Taylor 64'; Steemson 65'

Umpires:
Keeley O'Reilly (AUS)
Caroline Davis (AUS)

9 July 2013
15:00

NSW (New South Wales)	6–1	(Victoria (state)) VIC
Leard 30'; Divall 43'; Hanna 49', 51', 55'; Hughes 70'	Report	Wagg 59'

Umpires:
Kelby Pointon (AUS)
Brydie Welham (AUS)

10 July 2013
09:00

WA (Western Australia)	1–0	(South Australia) SA
Burton 68'	Report

Umpires:
Alycia Amundson (AUS)
Leonie Young (AUS)

10 July 2013
11:00

QLD (Queensland)	3–0	(Northern Territory) NT
Taylor 19'; S. Fitzpatrick 38'; Deeth 55'	Report

Umpires:
Caroline Davis (AUS)
Emily Nunn (AUS)

10 July 2013
13:00

ACT (Australian Capital Territory)	1–2	(New South Wales) NSW
Montgomery 60'	Report	Patterson 24'; Hanna 62'

Umpires:
Claire Butcher (AUS)
Deborah O'Connell (AUS)

10 July 2013
15:00

VIC (Victoria (state))	2–2	(Tasmania) TAS
Pikia 14'; Brennan 42'	Report	Kirkland 6'; Chesterman 52'

Umpires:
Brydie Welham (AUS)
Kerryl Chandler (AUS)

=== Classification round ===
==== Fifth to eighth place classification ====
Crossover
12 July 2013
(Victoria (state)) VIC	6
(Northern Territory) NT	0
12 July 2013
(Tasmania) TAS	0
(South Australia) SA	1

Fifth Place
13 July 2013
(Victoria (state)) VIC	1
(South Australia) SA	1
Seventh Place
13 July 2013
(Northern Territory) NT	0
(Tasmania) TAS	2

===== Crossover =====
12 July 2013
09:30

VIC (Victoria (state))	6–0	(Northern Territory) NT
Anderson 30'; Kleinschmidt 39', 58', 63'; Hopkins 41'; Pikia 52'	Report

Umpires:
Claire Butcher (AUS)
Deborah O'Connell (AUS)

12 July 2013
12:00

TAS (Tasmania)	0–1	(South Australia) SA
	Report	Spano 15'

Umpires:
Leonie Young (AUS)
Brydie Welham (AUS)

===== Seventh and eighth place =====
13 July 2013
09:30

NT (Northern Territory)	1–1	(Tasmania) TAS
	Report	Arthur 29', 55'

Umpires:
Brydie Welham (AUS)
Leonie Young (AUS)

===== Fifth and sixth place =====
13 July 2013
12:00

VIC (Victoria (state))	1–1	(South Australia) SA
Brennan 49'	Report	Baird 45'

Umpires:
Alycia Amundson (AUS)
Claire Butcher (AUS)

==== First to fourth place classification ====
Semi-finals
12 July 2013
(New South Wales) NSW	4
(Australian Capital Territory) ACT	0
12 July 2013
(Queensland) QLD	2
(Western Australia) WA	1

Final
13 July 2013
(New South Wales) NSW	2
(Queensland) QLD	1
Third Place
13 July 2013
(Australian Capital Territory) ACT	0
(Western Australia) WA	2

===== Semi-finals =====
12 July 2013
14:30

NSW (New South Wales)	4–0	(Australian Capital Territory) ACT
Watterson 18'; Hayes 19'; Hanna 27'; Stewart 68'	Report

Umpires:
Kerryl Chandler (AUS)
Keeley O'Reilly (AUS)

12 July 2013
17:00

QLD (Queensland)	2–1	(Western Australia) WA
Gasmier 46'; Ferguson 61'	Report	Johnson 8'

Umpires:
Alycia Amundson (AUS)
Kelby Pointon (AUS)

===== Third and fourth place =====
13 July 2013
14:30

ACT (Australian Capital Territory)	0–2	(Western Australia) WA
	Report	Green 42'; Tonkin 49'

Umpires:
Keeley O'Reilly (AUS)
Caroline Davis (AUS)

===== Final =====
13 July 2013
17:00

NSW (New South Wales)	2–1	(Queensland) QLD
Hanna 54'; Hayes 66'	Report	Farrell 25'

Umpires:
Kelby Pointon (AUS)
Emily Nunn (AUS)
