= Woodcroft =

Woodcroft may refer to:

- Woodcroft, Edmonton, Canada
- Woodcroft, Gloucestershire, England
- Woodcroft, New South Wales, Australia
- Woodcroft, South Australia
- Woodcroft (surname)
