= Alexis de Armond =

Canadian field hockey player (born 1997)

Personal information
- Born: 4 April 1997 (age 29) Victoria, British Columbia
- Height: 165 cm (5 ft 5 in)

Sport
- Sport: Field hockey
- Position: Midfield
National team
Years	Team	Caps	Goals
2016	Canada U–21	6	(4)
2016–	Canada	29	(0)
Medal record
Representing Canada
Women's field hockey
Pan American Cup
Bronze medal – third place	2022 Santiago	Team

Alexis De Armond (born 4 April 1997) is a field hockey player from Canada.

== Personal life ==
Alexis De Armond was born and raised in Victoria, British Columbia.

== Career ==
=== Under–21 ===
De Armond made her debut for the Canadian U–21 team in 2016 at the Pan American Junior Championship in Tacarigua.

=== National team ===
Alexis De Armond debuted for the national team in 2017 during a test series against the United States in Chula Vista.

She won her first medal in 2022, taking home bronze at the Pan American Cup in Santiago. Later that year she was named in the squad for the FIH World Cup in Amsterdam and Terrassa.
