= Magdalena Fernández Ladra =

Argentine field hockey player

Personal information
- Born: 10 March 1995 (age 31) Buenos Aires, Argentina
- Height: 1.65 m (5 ft 5 in)
- Weight: 50 kg (110 lb)

Sport
- Sport: Field hockey
- Position: Midfielder/Forward
- Club: Banco Nación
Senior career
| Years | Team | Caps | Goals |
| – | Banco Nación | - | - |
National team
| Years | Team | Caps | Goals |
| 2017– | Argentina | 56 | - |
Medal record
Pan American Cup
| Gold medal – first place | 2017 Lancaster |
Junior World Cup
| Gold medal – first place | 2016 Santiago |
| Silver medal – second place | 2013 Mönchengladbach |

Magdalena Fernández Ladra (born 10 March 1995) is an Argentine field hockey player and part of the Argentina national team.

She was also the part of the Argentine team that won the 2016 Women's Hockey Junior World Cup after a stunning victory over Netherlands in the finals.

She has three sisters who are also hockey players, one of them, Milagros is also part of the national team.
