= 2013 Girls' EuroHockey Youth Championships =

Tournament details
- Host country: Ireland
- City: Dublin
- Dates: 29 July – 4 August
- Teams: 8 (from 1 confederation)
- Venue: University College Dublin

Final positions
- Champions: Netherlands (5th title)
- Runner-up: Germany
- Third place: England

Tournament statistics
- Matches played: 20
- Goals scored: 108 (5.4 per match)

The 2013 Girls' EuroHockey Youth Championships was the seventh edition of the Girls' EuroHockey Youth Championships, the biennial international women's under-18 field hockey championship of Europe organized by the European Hockey Federation. The tournament was held from 29 July to 4 August 2013 in Dublin, Ireland at the University College Dublin.

Netherlands won the tournament for the fifth time after defeating Germany 1–0 in the final.

== Qualified teams ==
The following teams participated in the 2013 EuroHockey Youth Championship:

Dates	Event	Location	Quotas	Qualifier(s)
–	Host		1	Ireland
12–17 July 2011	2011 EuroHockey Youth Championship	Utrecht, Netherlands	6	Belgium; England; France; Germany; Netherlands
12–17 July 2011	2011 EuroHockey Youth Championship II	Prague, Czech Republic	1	Russia; Wales
Total			8	

== Format ==
The eight teams were split into two groups of four teams. The top two teams advanced to the semifinals to determine the winner in a knockout system. The bottom two teams played in a new group with the teams they did not play against in the group stage. The bottom two teams were relegated to the EuroHockey Youth Championship II.

== Preliminary round ==
=== Pool A ===
Pos	Team	Pld	W	D	L	GF	GA	GD	Pts	Qualification
1	Netherlands	3	3	0	0	21	0	+21	9	Semi-finals
2	France	3	2	0	1	5	7	−2	6	Semi-finals
3	Ireland (H)	3	1	0	2	7	9	−2	3	
4	Wales	3	0	0	3	0	17	−17	0	

Source: England Hockey
Rules for classification: 1) points; 2) goal difference; 3) goals scored; 4) head-to-head result.
(H) Hosts

29 July 2013
15:00

Netherlands	5–0	France
	Report

Umpires:
Caroline Fenn (ENG)
Magali Sergeant (BEL)

29 July 2013
17:00

Ireland	5–0	Wales
Duncan 46', 58'; O'Donnell 49'; Hawkshaw 61'; McGirr 70+'	Report

Umpires:
Ana Faias (POR)
Svetlana Grigorieva (RUS)

30 July 2013
15:00

France	2–0	Wales
	Report

Umpires:
Magali Sergeant (BEL)
Sandra Wagner (GER)

30 July 2013
17:00

Ireland	0–6	Netherlands
	Report	Matla 15'; Van Ramshorst 27'; Zerbo 37', 39'; Slinkert 55'; Kerstholt 65'

Umpires:
Caroline Fenn (ENG)
Svetlana Grigorieva (RUS)

1 August 2013
11:00

Netherlands	10–0	Wales
Kerstholt 5', 33', 38', 51', 61'; Van Wijk 37'; Van der Plas 48'; Matla 52', 53'; Zerbo 63'	Report

Umpires:
Magali Sergeant (BEL)
Svetlana Grigorieva (RUS)

1 August 2013
13:00

France	3–2	Ireland
	Report

Umpires:
Caroline Fenn (ENG)
Sandra Wagner (GER)

=== Pool B ===
Pos	Team	Pld	W	D	L	GF	GA	GD	Pts	Qualification
1	Germany	3	3	0	0	18	2	+16	9	Semi-finals
2	England	3	2	0	1	15	6	+9	6	Semi-finals
3	Belgium	3	1	0	2	4	9	−5	3	
4	Russia	3	0	0	3	1	21	−20	0	

Source: England Hockey
Rules for classification: 1) points; 2) goal difference; 3) goals scored; 4) head-to-head result.

29 July 2013
11:00

Germany	6–0	Belgium
Gräve 16', 52'; Gablać 29'; Wahl 63'; Schütze 64'; Oruz 67'	Report

Umpires:
Laura Houlston (WAL)
Christine Reid (IRE)

29 July 2013
13:00

England	10–1	Russia
McWhirter 6', 16', 53'; Burrows 20'; Crowson 26', 27', 67'; Massey 48'; Tait 65', 66'	Report	Yashchenko 24'

Umpires:
Elodie Franchomme (FRA)
Ymkje van Slooten (NED)

31 July 2013
15:00

Belgium	3–0	Russia
Ronquetti 15', 16'; Stappaerts 38'	Report

Umpires:
Christine Reid (IRE)
Ymkje van Slooten (NED)

31 July 2013
17:00

England	2–4	Germany
O'Malley 28'; McWhirter 62'	Report	Velmans 20'; Albrecht 38'; Gräve 40', 54'

Umpires:
Ana Faias (POR)
Laura Houlston (WAL)

1 August 2013
15:00

Germany	8–0	Russia
Schütze 11', 40', 42'; Winter 16', 39'; Lorenz 33'; Gräve 34'; Wahl 47'	Report

Umpires:
Elodie Franchomme (FRA)
Ana Faias (POR)

1 August 2013
17:00

Belgium	1–3	England
Duquesne 50'	Report	Crowson 23'; Andrews 33'; Elliott 68'

Umpires:
Ymkje van Slooten (NED)
Laura Houlston (WAL)

== Fifth to eighth place classification ==
Points from the preliminary round were carried over to Pool C to determine group standings.

=== Pool C ===
Pos	Team	Pld	W	D	L	GF	GA	GD	Pts	Relegation
1	Belgium	3	3	0	0	9	1	+8	9	
2	Russia	3	1	1	1	8	6	+2	4	
3	Ireland (H)	3	1	1	1	8	6	+2	4	EuroHockey Youth Championship II
4	Wales	3	0	0	3	1	13	−12	0	EuroHockey Youth Championship II

Source: England Hockey
Rules for classification: 1) points; 2) goal difference; 3) goals scored; 4) head-to-head result.
(H) Hosts
- Note: As Ireland and Russia were still tied after all tie-breakers, a penalty shoot-out was contested to determine sixth and seventh places.

3 August 2013
11:00

Wales	1–6	Russia
	Report

Umpires:
Carolyn Fenn (ENG)
Magali Sergeant (BEL)

3 August 2013
13:00

Ireland	1–4	Belgium
Carey 30'	Report	Simons 1', 53'; Ronquetti 6'; Duquesne 27'

Umpires:
Elodie Franchomme (FRA)
Ana Faias (POR)

4 August 2013
09:00

Belgium	2–0	Wales
Simons 63'; Weicker 68'	Report

Umpires:
Svetlana Grigorieva (RUS)
Christine Reid (IRE)

4 August 2013
11:00

Ireland	2–2	Russia
22'; Chambers 34'	Report	Kasakova 7', 59'
Penalties
	1–2

Umpires:
Laura Houlston (WAL)
Sandra Wagner (GER)

== First to fourth place classification ==
=== Bracket ===
Semi-finals
3 August
Netherlands	6
England	1
3 August
Germany	9
France	0

Final
4 August
Netherlands	1
Germany	0
Third place
4 August
France	1 (1)
England (pen.)	1 (3)

=== Semi-finals ===
3 August 2013
15:00

Germany	9–0	France
Gablać 5', 34'; Lorenz 28', 49', 57'; Kühnemann 30'; Velmans 55'; Huse 61'; Körbel 67'	Report

Umpires:
Ymkje van Slooten (NED)
Laura Houlston (WAL)

3 August 2013
17:30

Netherlands	6–1	England
Zerbo 16', 28', 65'; Van Ramshorst 21'; Roosen 39'; Matla 57'	Report	Elliott 14'

Umpires:
Sandra Wagner (GER)
Christine Reid (IRE)

=== Third and fourth place ===
4 August 2013
13:00

France	1–1	England
Brabant 38'	Report	Massey 47'
Penalties
	1–3

Umpires:
Ymkje van Slooten (NED)
Magali Sergeant (BEL)

=== Final ===
4 August 2013
15:00

Netherlands	1–0	Germany
Slinkert 2'	Report

Umpires:
Carolyn Fenn (ENG)
Ana Faias (POR)

== Final standings ==
Pos	Team	Relegation
1st place, gold medalist(s)	Netherlands (C)	
2nd place, silver medalist(s)	Germany	
3rd place, bronze medalist(s)	England	
4	France	
5	Belgium	
6	Russia	
7	Ireland (H, R)	EuroHockey Youth Championship II
8	Scotland (R)	EuroHockey Youth Championship II

(C) Champion; (H) Host; (R) Relegated
