= Woodcroft (surname) =

Woodcroft is a surname. Notable people with the surname include:

- Bennet Woodcroft (1803–1879), British textile manufacturer
- Chris Woodcroft (born 1965), Canadian educator and wrestler
- Craig Woodcroft (born 1969), Canadian ice hockey head
- Jay Woodcroft (born 1976), Canadian ice hockey player
- Nikki Woodcroft (born 1996), Canadian field hockey player
