= Nicole Woods =

American women's field hockey player (born 1996)

Personal information
- Born: July 7, 1996 (age 30) Beverly, MA, United States
- Height: 5’2”
- Spouse: Andrew Weisbach

Sport
- Sport: Field hockey
- Position: Attacker
- Club: Northeast Elite
National team
Years	Team	Caps	Goals
2018–	United States	31	-
Medal record
Women's field hockey
Representing United States
Pan American Cup
Bronze medal – third place	2017 Lancaster

Nicole Woods (born July 7, 1996) is an American women's field hockey player. Woods debuted for the United States national team in 2017, following her performances in the national junior team.

Woods first represented the United States junior national team at the 2016 Junior Pan American Cup in Tacarigua, Trinidad and Tobago. From this tournament, the team qualified for the 2016 Junior World Cup, where Woods also represented the United States.

Woods debuted for the United States senior team in 2017 in a test series against Ireland, in Lancaster.

Woods was a member of the United States team at the 2017 Pan American Cup. At the tournament, the team's historic semi-final defeat against Chile relegated the USA from the final for the first time ever.
