= Megan Crowson =

English field hockey player

Personal information
- Full name: Megan Louise Crowson
- Born: 13 June 1996 (age 30) Hatfield, England

Sport
- Sport: Field hockey
- Position: Forward
- Club: Clifton Robinsons
National team
Years	Team	Caps	Goals
2013–2014	England U–18	15	(9)
2015–2017	England U–21	19	(8)
Medal record
Women's field hockey
Representing England
EuroHockey Youth Championship
Bronze medal – third place	2013 Dublin	Team

Megan Louise Crowson (born 13 June 1996) is field hockey player from England, who plays as a forward.

== Personal life ==
Megan Crowson has a degree in Exercise and Sport Science from the University of Exeter.

== Career ==
=== Under–18 ===
Crowson debuted for the England U–18 team in 2013 at the EuroHockey Youth Championship in Dublin. At the tournament she captained the side to a bronze medal, scoring four times during the tournament.

In 2014, Crowson also represented the team in test matches against Belgium and Scotland.

=== Under–21 ===
Following a successful career with the national U–18 team, Megan Crowson progresses into the England U–21 side in 2015. She made four appearances that year, all against Germany U–21.

2016 was Crowson's busiest year with the U–21 team. She represented the team on three occasions; at a four nations tournament in Bad Kreuznach, an invitational tournament in Valencia and at the FIH Junior World Cup in Santiago.

=== Indoor ===
In 2018, Crowson was a member of the bronze medal-winning England team at the EuroHockey Indoor Championship II in Brussels.
