= Bárbara Borgia =

Italian-Argentine field hockey player

Personal information
- Born: 20 May 1997 (age 29) Buenos Aires, Argentina
- Height: 156 cm (5 ft 1 in)
- Weight: 49 kg (108 lb)

Sport
- Sport: Field hockey
- Position: Midfielder
- Club: UD Taburiente
National team
Years	Team	Caps	Goals
2018	Argentina	4	-
2021	Italy	3	-
Medal record
Women's field hockey
Representing Argentina
South American Games
Gold medal – first place	2018 Cochabamba
Junior World Cup
Gold medal – first place	2016 Santiago	Team

Bárbara Borgia (born 20 May 1997) is an Italian-Argentine field hockey player.

== Hockey career ==
Borgia was part of the Argentina Junior National Team at the 2016 Junior World Cup where the team won the gold medal, defeating the Netherlands in the final.

In 2018, Borgia took part of the team that won the 2018 South American Games.

In 2021, Borgia represented Italy in the Hockey World Cup European Qualifiers.
