= Nikki Woodcroft =

Canadian women's field hockey player (born 1996)

Personal information
- Full name: Nicole Woodcroft
- Born: 30 January 1996 (age 30) Waterloo, Canada
- Height: 160 cm (5 ft 3 in)
- Weight: 46 kg (101 lb)

Sport
- Sport: Field hockey
- Position: Attacker
National team
Years	Team	Caps	Goals
2016–	Canada	40	-

Nikki Woodcroft (born 30 January 1996) is a Canadian women's field hockey player.

== Playing career ==
=== Senior National Team ===
Woodcroft first represented Canada in 2016, in a test series against the United States. Her first major tournament with the team was the 2017 Pan American Cup, where the team finished fourth.

In 2018, Woodcroft was named in the Canada team for the 2018 Commonwealth Games in Gold Coast, Australia. The team finished fifth in the tournament.

=== Junior National Team ===
Woodcroft first represented the junior national team in 2011, at just 15 years old. She continued to represent the team until 2016, at the Junior Pan American Cup.

== Personal life ==
=== Family ===
Not only does Nikki play for the Canadian national team, her sister Amanda is also a national representative.
