= Catherine Caro =

American field hockey player (born 1995)

Personal information
- Full name: Catherine Caro
- Born: February 5, 1995 (age 31) Martinsville, N.J., United States

Sport
- Sport: Field hockey
- Position: Midfielder
National team
Years	Team	Caps	Goals
2018–	United States	8	-
Medal record
Women's field hockey
Representing United States

Catherine Caro (born February 5, 1995) is a women's field hockey player from the United States. Caro joined the United States national team in 2018, following success in the national junior team.

A resident of the Martinsville section of Bridgewater Township, New Jersey, Caro graduated from Bridgewater-Raritan High School in 2013.

Caro first represented the United States junior national team at the 2016 Junior Pan American Cup in Tacarigua, Trinidad and Tobago. From this tournament, the team qualified for the 2016 Junior World Cup, where Caro also represented the United States.

Caro debuted for the United States senior team in 2018 in a test series against the Netherlands.
