= Sofía Machado =

Chilean field hockey player

Personal information
- Full name: Sofía Machado Paonessa
- Born: 1 November 1995 (age 30) Santiago, Chile

Sport
- Sport: Field hockey
- Position: Defense
- Club: Universidad Católica
National team
Years	Team	Caps	Goals
2015–2016	Chile U–21	17	(4)
2017–	Chile	11	(0)
Medal record
Women's field hockey
Representing Chile
Pan American Junior Championship
Bronze medal – third place	2016 Tacarigua	Team

Sofía Machado Paonessa (born 1 November 1995) is a field hockey player from Chile, who plays as a defender.

== Personal life ==
Sofía Machado cites former Argentine international, Luciana Aymar, as being her sporting hero.

Machado studied Physical Education and Health at Andrés Bello University.

== Career ==
=== Under–21 ===
In 2016, Sofía Machado was a member of the Chile U–21 that won bronze at the Pan American Junior Championship in Tacarigua. Later that year, she also represented Chile at the FIH Junior World Cup in Santiago, where the team finished 9th.

=== Las Diablas ===
At the conclusion of her junior career, Machado debuted for Las Diablas in 2017 during a test event in Cape Town.

Since her debut, Machado has been included in national teams for test matches but never major international tournaments. In 2020, she was officially raised into the senior national squad.
