= Bianca Donati =

Argentine field hockey player

Personal information
- Born: 5 June 1995 (age 31)
- Height: 163 cm (5 ft 4 in)
- Weight: 57 kg (126 lb)

Sport
- Sport: Field hockey
- Position: Defender
- Club: HF Lorenzoni
Senior career
| Years | Team | Caps | Goals |
| – | Palihue | - | - |
| – | Monte Hermoso | - | - |
| 2014– | River Plate | - | - |
| 2021– | HF Lorenzoni | - | - |
National team
| Years | Team | Caps | Goals |
| 2017– | Argentina | 35 | - |
Medal record
Women's field hockey
Representing Argentina
Junior World Cup
| Gold medal – first place | 2016 Santiago |

Bianca Donati (born 5 June 1995) is an Argentine field hockey player.

== Background ==
Donati was born in Bahia Blanca in Argentina. She started paying hockey since she was five years old with her siblings.

== Hockey career ==
Donati was part of the Argentina Junior National Team at the 2016 Junior World Cup where the team won the gold medal, defeating the Netherlands in the final.

In 2017, Donati was called into the senior national women's team. She competed in the team that finished fifth at the 2016-17 Hockey World League Final in Auckland.
