= Ilse Kappelle =

Dutch field hockey player

Personal information
- Full name: Ilse Maartje Willemijn Kappelle
- Born: 13 May 1998 (age 28) Amstelveen, Netherlands

Sport
- Sport: Field hockey
- Position: Defence/Midfield
- Club: Amsterdam
National team
Years	Team	Caps	Goals
2016–2019	Netherlands U–21	12	(2)
2020–	Netherlands	15	(0)
Medal record
Women's field hockey
Representing Netherlands
European Championship
Gold medal – first place	2021 Amstelveen
Junior World Cup
Silver medal – second place	2016 Santiago
EuroHockey Junior Championship
Silver medal – second place	2019 Valencia

Ilse Kappelle (born 13 May 1998) is a field hockey player from the Netherlands, who plays as a defender and midfielder.

== Personal life ==
Ilse Kappelle was born in Amstelveen and raised in Nijmegen, Netherlands.

== Career ==
=== Club hockey ===
In the Dutch Hoofdklasse, Kappelle plays club hockey for Amsterdam.

=== National teams ===
==== Under–21 ====
Kappelle made her debut for the Netherlands U–21 side in 2016 at the Junior World Cup in Santiago, Chile. At the tournament, Kappelle scored two goals, and helped the team to a silver medal finish, losing in the final to Argentina.

In 2019, Kappelle made her second and final appearance for the Under–21 team at the EuroHockey Junior Championship in Valencia, Spain. Kappelle was captain of the team, which finished second after losing the final in a penalty shoot-out against Spain.

==== Oranje Dames ====
Kappelle was named in the Netherlands senior squad for the first time in 2019, and was set to make her debut in 2020.
