= Milagros Fernández Ladra =

Argentine field hockey player (born 1997)

Personal information
- Born: 27 February 1997 (age 29) Buenos Aires, Argentina
- Height: 1.65 m (5 ft 5 in)
- Weight: 62 kg (137 lb)

Sport
- Sport: Field hockey
- Position: Forward
- Club: HGC
Senior career
Years	Team	Caps	Goals
–	Banco Nación	-	-
–2020	Taburiente	-	-
2020–present	HGC	-	-
National team
Years	Team	Caps	Goals
2017–	Argentina	27	-
Medal record
Champions Trophy
Bronze medal – third place	2018 Changzhou
South American Games
Gold medal – first place	2018 Cochabamba	Team
Junior World Cup
Gold medal – first place	2016 Santiago
Pan American Junior Championship
Gold medal – first place	2016 Tacarigua

Milagros Fernández Ladra (born 27 February 1997) is an Argentine field hockey player and part of the Argentina national team.

She was also the part of the Argentine team that won the 2016 Women's Hockey Junior World Cup after a stunning victory over Netherlands in the finals.
