= Lucina von der Heyde =

Argentine field hockey player (born 1997)

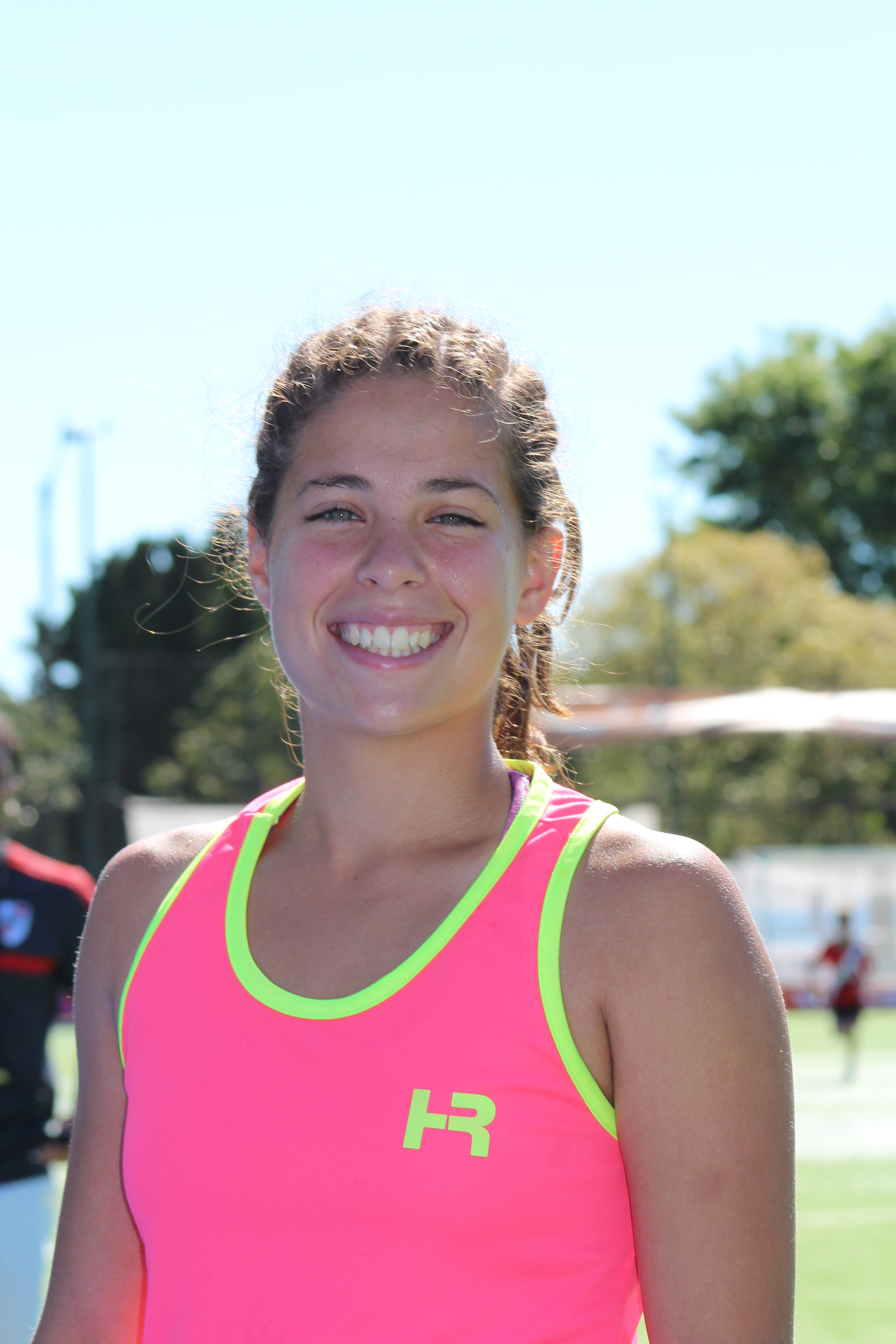

Personal information
- Born: 24 January 1997 (age 29) Posadas, Argentina
- Height: 1.60 m (5 ft 3 in)
- Weight: 56 kg (123 lb)

Sport
- Sport: Field hockey
- Position: Midfielder
- Club: River Plate
Senior career
Years	Team	Caps	Goals
-2018	River Plate	-	-
2018–present	Mannheimer HC	-	-
National team
Years	Team	Caps	Goals
2016	Argentina U21	16	(5)
2016–2023	Argentina	105	(9)
2026	Germany		-
Medal record
Women's field hockey
Representing Argentina
Champions Trophy
Gold medal – first place	2016 London
Bronze medal – third place	2018 Changzhou
Pan American Cup
Gold medal – first place	2017 Lancaster
Junior World Cup
Gold medal – first place	2016 Santiago

Lucina Juliana von der Heyde (born 24 January 1997) is an Argentine field hockey player who plays as midfielder for German club Mannheimer HC.

She was part of the Argentine team at the 2016 Summer Olympics in Rio de Janeiro. At the 2018 Hockey Stars Awards, she was named the FIH Rising Star of the Year. In 2019 she took a break from the national team. In late 2022 she was called out for the national team once more and competed in the 2022-23 Pro League getting a silver medal, but then quit the team.

In 2026, three years after her last participation in Las Leonas, she received the call to join the German team since she became a legal German citizen.

Preceded by María José Granatto	FIH Rising Star of the Year; 2018	Succeeded by Lalremsiami
