= Marta Segú =

Spanish field hockey player (born 1995)

Personal information
- Full name: Marta Segú Rueda
- Born: 22 June 1995 (age 31) Spain

Sport
- Sport: Field hockey
- Position: Attacker
National team
| Years | Team | Caps | Goals |
| 2015– | Spain | 37 | - |
Medal record
European Championship
| Bronze medal – third place | 2019 Antwerp |
| Bronze medal – third place | 2025 Mönchengladbach |

Marta Segú Rueda (Note: In this Spanish name, the first or paternal surname is Segú and the second or maternal family name is Rueda.) (born 22 June 1995) is a Spanish field hockey player.

Segú has represented the Spanish junior national team at two Junior World Cups, the first in Mönchengladbach, Germany in 2013, and the second in Santiago, Chile, in 2016. At the 2016 tournament, the Spanish team narrowly missed a medal, finishing in fourth place.

Segú first represented the senior national team in 2015, in a test match against Germany.
