= Holly Munro =

English international field hockey player

Personal information
- Born: 22 July 1998 (age 28) England

Sport
- Sport: Field hockey
- Position: Defender
- Club: Clifton Robinsons
National team
Years	Team	Caps	Goals
2016–2019	England & GB	16	(0)
2018–2019	Great Britain	0	(0)

Holly Munro (born 22 July 1998) is a Welsh international field hockey player who plays as a defender for Wales and was in the Great Britain senior squad for the 2019 FIH Pro League. Having made her international debut in 2022 against South Africa, she also appeared at the Commonwealth Games for Wales in 2022.

She plays club hockey in the Women's England Hockey League Premier Division for Clifton Robinsons. Having begun her playing career with Richmond Hockey Club before becoming a central piece of Surbiton's Premier League dominance - winning an unprecedented 8 titles in a row. Munro won multiple medals at U18 and U21 European Championships with England - captaining the side in 2017–18 to a famous 3–2 win against Germany.

Away from the hockey pitch, Munro studied psychology at the University of Birmingham.

Her brother, Jack Munro, is an amateur golfer who most recently played in the 151st Open Qualifying and studied at St. Andrews University for his undergraduate and master's degrees.
