= Lara Pampín =

Spanish field hockey player (born 1995)

Personal information
- Full name: Lara Pampín Beltrame
- Born: 3 May 1995 (age 31) Spain

Sport
- Sport: Field hockey
- Position: Defence
- Club: SPV-Complutense
National team
Years	Team	Caps	Goals
2014–2016	Spain U–21	15	(2)
2017–	Spain	24	(0)
Medal record
Women's field hockey
Representing Spain
FIH Hockey Series
Gold medal – first place	2018–19 Valencia	Team

Lara Pampín Beltrame (born 3 May 1995) is a field hockey player from Spain, who plays as a defender.

== Career ==
=== Club hockey ===
Pampín plays hockey for SPV-Complutense in the División de Honor in Spain.

=== National teams ===
==== Under–21 ====
In 2014, Pampín made her debut for the Spanish Under–21 team at the EuroHockey Junior Championship in Waterloo where the team finished fourth.

She followed this up with an appearance at the 2016 FIH Junior World Cup in Santiago.

==== Red Sticks ====
Pampín made her debut for the Spanish national team, the 'Red Sticks', in 2017.

In 2019, Pampín won her first medal with the national team at the FIH Series Finals in Valencia, taking home gold.
