= Kate Hanna =

Australian field hockey player

Personal information
- Full name: Kate Hanna
- Born: 1 October 1996 (age 29) Constitution Hill, New South Wales

Sport
- Sport: Field hockey
- Position: Midfielder
- Club: NSW Arrows
National team
Years	Team	Caps	Goals
2015–	Australia	31	(2)
Medal record
Women's field hockey
Representing Australia
Oceania Cup
Gold medal – first place	2017 Sydney	Team
Junior World Cup
Bronze medal – third place	2016 Santiago	Team

Kate Hanna (born 1 October 1996) is an Australian field hockey player. Hanna made her international debut for Australia in April 2015, in a test series against China.

== Early life ==
Kate Hanna was born in Constitution Hill, New South Wales. She attended Catherine McAuley Westmead, where after graduating she was awarded a one-year development scholarship with Australia's national hockey team, the Hockeyroos.

== Career ==
Hanna plays the position of forward in field hockey. At 16 years old, Hanna was named to the New South Wales hockey team for the first time, competing for the Australian Hockey League national title. Her team won the national title in October 2014.

She made her official debut with the Hockeyroos in April 2015. She was part of the 2016 Olympic training squad. That same year, Hanna was part of Australia's bronze medal-winning team at the 2016 Junior World Cup.

Hanna was chosen for the Hockeyroos team at the 2017 Hawke's Bay Cup where the Australian team ultimately finished in third place.
