= Lien Hillewaert =

Belgian field hockey player

Personal information
- Born: 27 November 1997 (age 28)

Sport
- Sport: Field hockey
- Position: Defender
- Club: Braxgata HC
National team
Years	Team	Caps	Goals
–	Belgium	62	-
Medal record
World Cup
Bronze medal – third place	2026 Wavre/Amstelveen
European Championship
Bronze medal – third place	2021 Amstelveen

Lien Hillewaert (born 27 November 1997) is a Belgian field hockey player for the Belgian national team.

She participated at the 2018 Women's Hockey World Cup.
