= Esme Burge =

English field hockey player

Personal information
- Full name: Esme Olivia Burge
- Born: 15 May 1999 (age 27) England

Sport
- Sport: Field hockey
- Position: Midfielder
- Club: Hampstead & Westminster
National team
Years	Team	Caps	Goals
2021–present	England	4	(0)
2019–present	Great Britain	8	(0)
–	ENGLAND & GB TOTAL:	12	(0)
Medal record
Women's field hockey
Representing England
- Updated on 11 June 2021

Esme Olivia Burge (born 15 May 1999) is an English field hockey player who plays as a midfielder for Hampstead & Westminster and the England and Great Britain national teams.

== Club career ==
Burge plays club hockey in Women's England Hockey League for Hampstead & Westminster.

She has also played hockey for University of Nottingham and Beeston.

== International career ==
Burge made her senior international debut for Great Britain against Germany on 7 June 2019.

She made her senior international debut for England against Italy on 6 June 2021, in the EuroHockey Championship 2021 Women.
