= Erica Sanders =

English field hockey player

Personal information
- Born: 18 May 1997 (age 29) Stockport, England

Sport
- Sport: Field hockey
- Position: Forward
- Club: Surbiton
National team
Years	Team	Caps	Goals
2017–present	England	15	(1)
2018–present	Great Britain	14	(0)
–	ENGLAND & GB TOTAL:	29	(1)
Medal record
Women's field hockey
Representing England
EuroHockey Junior Championship
Silver medal – second place	2017 Valencia
- Updated on 11 June 2021

Erica Niamh Sanders (born 18 May 1997) is an English field hockey player who plays for the England and Great Britain national teams. A former pupil of Repton School, Erika is the Director of Hockey.

== Biography ==
Sanders plays club hockey in the

Sanders has also played for Surbiton, University of Birmingham and Beeston.

At the end of the 2024 season, she joined Surbiton after three years with Dutch Hoofdklasse team Haagsche Delftsche Mixed. During the 2024–25 Women's England Hockey League season she was part of the Surbiton team that finished runner-up in the league behind Reading.
