= 2021–22 Women's FIH Pro League squads =

This article lists the squads of all participating teams in the 2021–22 FIH Pro League. The nine national teams involved in the tournament were required to register a squad of up to 32 players.

== Argentina ==
The following is the Argentina squad for the 2021–22 FIH Pro League.

Head coach: Fernando Ferrara

1. Belén Succi (GK)
2. Sofía Toccalino
3. Agustina Gorzelany
4. Sofía Cairó
5. Agostina Alonso (C)
7. Agustina Albertario
9. Delfina Merino (C)
10. María José Granatto
13. Cristina Cosentino (GK)
14. Clara Barberi (GK)
16. Bárbara Dichiara
17. Rocío Sánchez Moccia (C)
18. Victoria Sauze (C)
20. Valentina Raposo
21. Victoria Granatto
22. Eugenia Trinchinetti
23. Micaela Retegui
24. Celina di Santo
25. Jimena Cedrés
28. Julieta Jankunas
29. Victoria Miranda
30. Martina Triñanes
31. Valentina Marcucci
32. Valentina Costa Biondi
35. Brisa Bruggesser
38. Constanza Cerundolo
39. Delfina Thome
40. Emilia Forcherio
43. Sol Pagella
44. Sol Lombardo
46. Daiana Pacheco
47. Mariana Pineda
48. Lourdes Pérez Iturraspe

== Belgium ==
The following is the Belgium squad for the 2021–22 FIH Pro League.

Head coach: (Netherlands) Raoul Ehren

2. Sophie Limauge
3. Justine Rasir
5. Abi Raye
6. Charlotte Englebert
7. Judith Vandermeiren
8. Emma Puvrez
10. Louise Versavel
13. Alix Gerniers (C)
15. Anne-Sophie Weyns
16. Tiphaine Duquesne
17. Michelle Struijk (C)
18. Shaunda Ikegwuonu
19. Barbara Nelen (C)
20. Pauline de Ryck (GK)
21. Aisling D'Hooghe (GK)
22. Stéphanie Vanden Borre
23. Elena Sotgiu (GK)
25. Pauline Leclef
26. Lien Hillewaert
29. Elodie Picard (GK)
30. Ambre Ballenghien
31. Lucie Breyne
32. Delphine Marien
33. Alexia 't Serstevens
34. Vanessa Blockmans
35. Anne-Sophie Roels
36. Hélène Brasseur
37. France De Mot
38. Agathe Willems

== China ==
The following is the China squad for the 2021–22 FIH Pro League.

Head coach: Wang Yang

1. Li Xinhuan (GK)
2. Gu Bingfeng
3. Gu Yangyan
6. Zhang Ying / Tang Wanli
9. Ma Ning
13. Li Hong
15. Zhang Jinrong
16. Ou Zixia
21. Liu Meng / Zhong Mengling
23. Yang Haoting
26. Chen Yang
29. Chen Yi
30. Zou Meirong
31. Zhong Jiaqi
32. Ye Jiao (GK)
33. Liu Hua
34. Fan Yunxia
35. Zhang Heyang

== England ==
The following is the England squad for the 2021–22 FIH Pro League.

Head coach: David Ralph

1. Madeleine Hinch (GK)
3. Amy Tennant (GK)
4. Laura Unsworth
6. Anna Toman
7. Hannah Martin
8. Esme Burge
9. Holly Hunt
10. Victoria McCabe
11. Miriam Pritchard (GK)
12. Olivia Hamilton
13. Elena Rayer
14. Tessa Howard
18. Giselle Ansley
19. Alexandra Malzer
20. Hollie Pearne-Webb
22. Elizabeth Neal
24. Shona McCallin
25. Sabbie Heesh (GK)
26. Lily Owsley
27. Joanne Hunter
29. Sophie Hamilton
30. Catherine De Ledesma
31. Grace Balsdon / Lorna MacKenzie
33. Sophie Hamilton
33. Fiona Crackles

== Germany ==
The following is the Germany squad for the 2021–22 FIH Pro League.

Head coach: (Belgium) Xavier Reckinger

1. Noelle Rother (GK)
3. Amelie Wortmann
6. Hannah Gablać
9. Elisa Gräve
10. Lisa Nolte
13. Teresa Martin-Pelegrina
16. Sonja Zimmermann
17. Pauline Heinz
19. Maike Schaunig
23. Carlotta Sippel
24. Pia Maertens
25. Viktoria Huse
26. Alisa Vivot
27. Naomi Heyn
28. Jette Fleschütz
29. Emma Boermans
31. Nele Aring
33. Katharina Kirschbaum
34. Katharina Kiefer
35. Emma Davidsmeyer
36. Philin Bolle
39. Anna Kilian (GK)
44. Stine Kurz
45. Lara Birkner
55. Marisa Martin-Pelegrina
99. Charlotte Gerstenhöfer

== India ==
The following is the India squad for the 2021–22 FIH Pro League.

Head coach: (Netherlands) Janneke Schopman

1. Navjot Kaur
2. Gurjit Kaur
3. Deep Grace Ekka
4. Monika Malik
5. Sonika Tandi
7. Sharmila Devi
8. Nikki Pradhan
9. Rajwinder Kaur
11. Savita Punia (GK)
12. Mariana Kujur
13. Rajani Etimarpu (GK)
15. Nisha Warsi
16. Vandana Katariya
18. Udita Duhan
19. Namita Toppo
20. Lalremsiami
24. Jyoti
25. Navneet Kaur
27. Sushila Chanu
30. Salima Tete
32. Neha Goyal
34. Bichu Devi Kharibam
42. Akshata Dhekale
50. Ishika Chaudhary
55. Deepika
58. Sangita Kumari

== Netherlands ==
The following is the Netherlands squad for the 2021–22 FIH Pro League.

Head coach: (Australia) Alyson Annan

3. Sanne Koolen
4. Freeke Moes
8. Marloes Keetels
12. Lidewij Welten
14. Ilse Kappelle
18. Pien Sanders
20. Laura Nunnink
23. Margot van Geffen
24. Eva de Goede
25. Kyra Fortuin
26. Joosje Burg
27. Renée van Laarhoven
29. Stella van Gils
30. Julia Remmerswaal (GK)
31. Sabine Plönissen
33. Yibbi Jansen
36. Marente Barentsen
40. Kiki Gunneman (GK)

== Spain ==
The following is the Spain squad for the 2021–22 FIH Pro League.

Head coach: (England) Adrian Lock

1. Maria Ruiz (GK)
2. Laura Barrios
3. Marta Grau
4. Sara Barrios
5. Lara Pampín
6. Clara Badia
7. Júlia Strappato
8. Lucía Jiménez Vicente
9. María López García
10. Belén Iglesias
11. Marta Segú
12. Florencia Amundson
13. Constanza Amundson
14. María Tost
15. Maialen García
16. Candela Mejías
17. Clara Ycart
18. Julia Pons
19. Begoña García
20. Xantal Giné
21. Beatriz Pérez
22. Laia Vidosa
23. Georgina Oliva (C)
24. Alejandra Torres-Quevedo
25. Ana Calvo (GK)
26. Mariona Serrahima
27. Anna Gil
28. Alicia Magaz
29. Melanie García (GK)
30. Patricia Álvarez
31. Maria Tello
32. Jana Martínez
33. Carlota Petchamé
34. Carola Salvatella
35. Berta Bonastre
36. Carmen Cano
37. Lola Riera

== United States ==
The following is the United States squad for the 2021–22 FIH Pro League.

Head coach: (Australia) Anthony Farry

1. Erin Matson
2. Lauren Moyer
3. Ashley Sessa
4. Danielle Grega
5. Madison Orobono
6. Megan Rodgers
7. Jillian Wolgemuth
8. Brooke Deberdine
9. Kelsey Farkas
10. Haley Randall
11. Julianna Tornetta
12. Amanda Magadan (C)
13. Ashley Hoffman
15. Kelsey Briddell
16. Linnea Gonzales
17. Elisabeth Yeager
18. Alia Marshall
19. Rachel Robinson
20. Leah Coruse
21. Alexandra Hammel
22. Jacqueline Sumfest
24. Kelee Lepage
25. Karlie Heistand
26. Hope Rose
27. Charlotte de Vries
28. Sofia Southam
29. Adele Iacobucci
30. Kealsie Robles (GK)
31. Kelsey Bing (GK)
32. Jennifer Rizzo (GK)
33. Caroline Hanks
34. Paytin Wirth
35. Madeleine Bacskai
36. Madeleine Zimmer
