= 2023 Women's EuroHockey Championship squads =

This article lists the confirmed squads for the 2023 Women's EuroHockey Nations Championship tournament held in Mönchengladbach, Netherlands between 18 and 27 August 2023. The eight national teams were required to register a playing squad of eighteen players and two reserves.

== Pool A ==
=== Belgium ===
Head coach: Raoul Ehren

Belgium announced their final squad on 4 August 2023.

3. Justine Rasir
4. Delphine Marien
5. Abigail Raye
6. Charlotte Englebert
7. Judith Vandermeiren
8. Emma Puvrez
9. Emily White
10. Louise Versavel
13. Alix Gerniers (C)
15. Vanessa Blockmans
17. Michelle Struijk (C)
19. Barbara Nelen (C)
21. Aisling D'Hooghe (GK)
22. Stéphanie Vanden Borre
23. Elena Sotgiu (GK)
31. Lucie Breyne
36. Hélène Brasseur
40. Camille Belis

=== Netherlands ===
Head coach: Paul van Ass

The Netherlands announced their final squad on 14 August 2023.

1. Anne Veenendaal (GK)
2. Luna Fokke
4. Freeke Moes
5. Lisa Post
7. Xan de Waard (C)
8. Yibbi Jansen
9. Renée van Laarhoven
10. Felice Albers
11. Maria Verschoor
14. Sanne Koolen
15. Frédérique Matla
16. Joosje Burg
18. Pien Sanders
19. Marijn Veen
20. Laura Nunnink
21. Pien Dicke
22. Josine Koning (GK)
23. Margot van Geffen

=== Italy ===
Head coach: (Netherlands) Robert Justus

3. Teresa Dalla Vittoria
5. Ailin Oviedo
7. Elettra Bormida
9. Emilia Munitis
10. Dalila Mirabella
11. Antonella Rinaldi
12. Lucía Inés Caruso (GK)
14. Antonella Bruni
18. Federica Carta (C)
19. Candela Carosso
21. Sara Puglisi (C)
25. Mercedes Pastor
26. Sofía Laurito
27. Lara Oviedo
28. Ivanna Pessina
30. Camila Machín
78. Chiara di Bella
30. Giulia Bianchini (GK)

=== Spain ===
Head coach: (England) Adrian Lock

Spain announced their final squad on 13 August 2023.

1. María Ruíz (GK)
2. Laura Barrios
4. Sara Barrios
7. Júlia Strappato
8. Lucía Jiménez
9. María López (C)
10. Belén Iglesias
11. Marta Segú
13. Constanza Amundson
15. Maialen García
16. Candela Mejías
17. Clara Ycart
20. Xantal Giné
21. Beatriz Pérez
22. Laia Vidosa
24. Alejandra Torres-Quevedo
26. Clara Pérez (GK)
30. Patricia Álvarez

== Pool B ==
=== England ===
Head coach: (Scotland) David Ralph

England announced their final squad on 3 August 2023.

3. Amy Tennant (GK)
4. Laura Roper
7. Hannah Martin
11. Holly Hunt
13. Elena Rayer
14. Tessa Howard
16. Isabelle Petter
19. Olivia Hamilton
20. Hollie Pearne-Webb (C)
21. Fiona Crackles
22. Elizabeth Neal
23. Sophie Hamilton
25. Sabbie Heesh (GK)
26. Lily Owsley
28. Flora Peel
31. Grace Balsdon
41. Lily Walker
42. Alexandra Malzer

=== Germany ===
Head coach: Valentin Altenburg

Germany announced their final squad on 21 July 2023.

1. Noelle Rother (GK)
2. Kira Horn
3. Amelie Wortmann
4. Nike Lorenz (C)
5. Selin Oruz
8. Anne Schröder
10. Lisa Nolte
11. Lena Micheel
12. Charlotte Stapenhorst
16. Sonja Zimmermann (C)
17. Pauline Heinz
20. Julia Sonntag (GK)
22. Cécile Pieper
25. Viktoria Huse
27. Stine Kurz
28. Jette Fleschütz
30. Hanna Granitzki
31. Linnea Weidemann

=== Ireland ===
Head coach: (Australia) Sean Dancer

Ireland announced their final squad on 18 July 2023.

1. Ayeisha McFerran (GK)
2. Elizabeth Murphy (GK)
3. Sarah McAuley
5. Michelle Carey
6. Róisín Upton
7. Niamh Carey
8. Sarah Hawkshaw
9. Kathryn Mullan (C)
10. Hannah McLoughlin
11. Sarah Torrans
12. Elena Neill
13. Naomi Carroll
14. Ellen Curran
15. Caoimhe Perdue
16. Charlotte Beggs
18. Caitlin Sherrin
21. Katie McKee
28. Deirdre Duke

=== Scotland ===
Head coach: Chris Duncan

Scotland announced their final squad on 2 August 2023.

1. Jennifer Eadie
4. Eve Pearson
5. Laura Swanson
6. Sophie Hinds
8. Amy Costello
9. Katie Robertson (C)
11. Katie Birch
12. Charlotte Watson
13. Ruth Blaikie
14. Elizabeth Wilson
15. Heather McEwan
17. Sarah Jamieson
18. Millie Steiger
20. Bronwyn Shields
21. Jessica Ross
23. Jessica Buchanan (GK)
27. Fiona Burnet
29. Amy Gibson (GK)
