= 2024 Women's FIH Hockey Olympic Qualifiers =

Field hockey competition

Tournament details
- Host countries: India; Spain
- Dates: 13–20 January
- Teams: 16 (from 4 confederations)
- Venue: 2 (in 2 host cities)

Tournament statistics
- Matches played: 40
- Goals scored: 152 (3.8 per match)
- Top scorer: (Belgium) Ambre Ballenghien (9 goals)

The 2024 Women's FIH Olympic Qualifiers was the final stage of the qualification for the women's field hockey event at the 2024 Summer Olympics. It was held in Ranchi, India and Valencia, Spain between 13 and 20 January 2024.

Belgium, Germany, Great Britain, Japan, Spain and the United States qualified for the Olympics.

== Format ==
Teams not qualifying from the continental qualification tournament were participating in this tournament according to the respective spots received by the FIH. The 16 teams were split into two eight-team tournaments. In each tournament the eight teams were divided into two four-team pools. After the round-robin stage the top two teams advanced to the semifinals. The top three teams of each tournament qualified for the Olympics.

== Qualified teams ==
| Qualification | Date | Host | Berths | Qualified team |
|---|---|---|---|---|
| 2023 EuroHockey Championship II | 30 July – 5 August 2023 | (Czech Republic) Prague | 2 | Czech Republic; Ukraine |
| 2023 Oceania Cup | 10–13 August 2023 | (New Zealand) Whangārei | 1 | New Zealand |
| 2023 EuroHockey Championship | 18–26 August 2023 | (Germany) Mönchengladbach | 6 | Belgium; Germany; Great Britain; Ireland; Spain; Italy |
| 2022 Asian Games | 25 September − 7 October 2023 | (China) Hangzhou | 4 | South Korea; India; Japan; Malaysia |
| 2023 Pan American Games | 26 October – 4 November 2023 | (Chile) Santiago | 3 | United States; Chile; Canada |
| Total | | | 16 | |

== Tournament 1 ==
2024 Women's FIH Hockey Olympic Qualifiers India
Tournament details
- Host country: India
- City: Ranchi
- Dates: 13–19 January
- Teams: 8 (from 4 confederations)
- Venue: Jaipal Singh Stadium

Final positions
- Champions: Germany
- Runner-up: United States
- Third place: Japan

Tournament statistics
- Matches played: 20
- Goals scored: 63 (3.15 per match)
- Top scorer(s): (Germany) Jette Fleschütz (Germany) Charlotte Stapenhorst (Germany) Sonja Zimmermann (4 goals)
- Best player: (Germany) Nike Lorenz
- Best young player: (India) Deepika
- Best goalkeeper: (United States) Kelsey Bing

The tournament was held at the Jaipal Singh Stadium in Ranchi, India from 13 to 19 January 2024. Germany defeated the United States 2–0 in the final as they both qualified for the 2024 Summer Olympics. Japan defeated the hosts India 1–0 and sealed the third and last qualifying spot in Ranchi.

=== Teams ===
- Chile
- Czech Republic
- Germany
- India
- Italy
- Japan
- New Zealand
- United States

All times are local (UTC+5:30).

=== Preliminary round ===
==== Pool A ====
| Pos | Team | Pld | W | D | L | GF | GA | GD | Pts | Qualification |
|---|---|---|---|---|---|---|---|---|---|---|
| 1 | Germany | 3 | 2 | 1 | 0 | 14 | 1 | +13 | 7 | Semi-finals |
| 2 | Japan | 3 | 2 | 1 | 0 | 5 | 1 | +4 | 7 | Semi-finals |
| 3 | Chile | 3 | 1 | 0 | 2 | 6 | 5 | +1 | 3 | Classification round |
| 4 | Czech Republic | 3 | 0 | 0 | 3 | 0 | 18 | −18 | 0 | Classification round |

Source: FIH
Rules for classification: 1) points; 2) matches won; 3) goal difference; 4) goals for; 5) head-to-head result; 6) field goals for.

13 January 2024
12:00

| Germany | 3–0 | Chile |
|---|---|---|
| Oruz 7'; Fleschütz 10'; Nolte 38' | Report |

Umpires:
Wanri Venter (RSA)
Annelize Rostron (RSA)

13 January 2024
14:30

| Japan | 2–0 | Czech Republic |
|---|---|---|
| Suzuki 4'; Oikawa 40' | Report |

Umpires:
Sophie Bockelmann (GER)
Katrina Turner (NZL)

14 January 2024
12:00

| Chile | 6–0 | Czech Republic |
|---|---|---|
| De las Heras 13'; Urroz 36', 47'; Caram 38'; Morales 44'; Maldonado 58' | Report |

Umpires:
Katrina Turner (NZL)
Rebecca Edwards (ENG)

14 January 2024
14:30

| Japan | 1–1 | Germany |
|---|---|---|
| Hasegawa 45' | Report | Nolte 35' |

Umpires:
Kristy Robertson (AUS)
Amber Church (NZL)

16 January 2024
12:00

| Germany | 10–0 | Czech Republic |
|---|---|---|
| Stapenhorst 19', 43'; Fleschütz 22', 44'; Lorenz 39'; Zimmermann 42', 46', 52'; Heinz 54'; Oruz 55' | Report |

Umpires:
Rebecca Edwards (ENG)
Kristy Robertson (AUS)

16 January 2024
14:30

| Chile | 0–2 | Japan |
|---|---|---|
| | Report | Urata 1'; Hasegawa 23' |

Umpires:
Sophie Bockelmann (GER)
Amber Church (NZL)

==== Pool B ====
| Pos | Team | Pld | W | D | L | GF | GA | GD | Pts | Qualification |
|---|---|---|---|---|---|---|---|---|---|---|
| 1 | United States | 3 | 3 | 0 | 0 | 4 | 0 | +4 | 9 | Semi-finals |
| 2 | India (H) | 3 | 2 | 0 | 1 | 8 | 3 | +5 | 6 | Semi-finals |
| 3 | New Zealand | 3 | 1 | 0 | 2 | 4 | 4 | 0 | 3 | Classification round |
| 4 | Italy | 3 | 0 | 0 | 3 | 1 | 10 | −9 | 0 | Classification round |

Source: FIH
Rules for classification: 1) points; 2) matches won; 3) goal difference; 4) goals for; 5) head-to-head result; 6) field goals for.
(H) Hosts

13 January 2024
17:00

| New Zealand | 3–0 | Italy |
|---|---|---|
| Davies 7', 51'; Dickins 53' | Report |

Umpires:
Cookie Tan (SGP)
Kristy Robertson (AUS)

13 January 2024
19:30

| India | 0–1 | United States |
|---|---|---|
| | Report | Tamer 16' |

Umpires:
Amber Church (NZL)
Rebecca Edwards (ENG)

14 January 2024
17:00

| United States | 2–0 | Italy |
|---|---|---|
| Sessa 20'; Hoffman 48' | Report |

Umpires:
Ayanna McClean (TTO)
Annelize Rostron (RSA)

14 January 2024
19:30

| New Zealand | 1–3 | India |
|---|---|---|
| Hull 9' | Report | Sangita 1'; Udita 12'; Beauty 14' |

Umpires:
Wanri Venter (RSA)
Sophie Bockelmann (GER)

16 January 2024
17:00

| United States | 1–0 | New Zealand |
|---|---|---|
| Yeager 17' | Report |

Umpires:
Cookie Tan (SGP)
Wanri Venter (RSA)

16 January 2024
19:30

| India | 5–1 | Italy |
|---|---|---|
| Udita 1', 56'; Deepika 41'; Salima 45'; Navneet 53' | Report | Machín 60+' |

Umpires:
Annelize Rostron (RSA)
Ayanna McClean (TTO)

=== Classification round ===
Crossover
18 January
Chile | 2 (1)
Italy (pen.) | 2 (2)
18 January
New Zealand | 2
Czech Republic | 0

Fifth place
19 January
Italy | 1
New Zealand | 3
Seventh place
19 January
Chile | 1
Czech Republic | 0

==== Crossover ====
18 January 2024
10:30

| Chile | 2–2 | Italy |
|---|---|---|
| Tala 13'; Valdivia 53' | Report | Bruni 20'; Carta 24' |
Penalties
| Tala (penalty shoot-out missed); De las Heras (penalty shoot-out missed); Ananías (penalty shoot-out scored); Avelli (penalty shoot-out missed); Khamis (penalty shoot-out missed) | 1–2 | (penalty shoot-out missed) Machín; (penalty shoot-out scored) Inaudi; (penalty shoot-out missed) Moras; (penalty shoot-out scored) Carta |

Umpires:
Rebecca Edwards (ENG)
Katrina Turner (NZL)

18 January 2024
13:30

| New Zealand | 2–0 | Czech Republic |
|---|---|---|
| Doar 57'; Child 60' | Report |

Umpires:
Ayanna McClean (TTO)
Kristy Robertson (AUS)

==== Seventh and eighth place ====
19 January 2024
10:30

| Chile | 1–0 | Czech Republic |
|---|---|---|
| Villagrán 27' | Report |

Umpires:
Amber Church (NZL)
Katrina Turner (NZL)

==== Fifth and sixth place ====
19 January 2024
13:30

| Italy | 1–3 | New Zealand |
|---|---|---|
| Pessina 21' | Report | Tynan 7'; Merry 10'; Cotter 31' |

Umpires:
Cookie Tan (SGP)
Wanri Venter (RSA)

=== Medal round ===
Semi-finals
18 January
Germany (pen.) | 2 (4)
India | 2 (3)
18 January
United States | 2
Japan | 1

Final
19 January
Germany | 2
United States | 0
Third place
19 January
India | 0
Japan | 1

==== Semi-finals ====
18 January 2024
16:30

| United States | 2–1 | Japan |
|---|---|---|
| Hoffman 52'; Tamer 55' | Report | Shimada 38' |

Umpires:
Sophie Bockelmann (GER)
Cookie Tan (SGP)

18 January 2024
19:30

| Germany | 2–2 | India |
|---|---|---|
| Stapenhorst 27', 57' | Report | Deepika 15'; Ishika 59' |
Penalties
| Weidemann (penalty shoot-out missed); Zimmermann (penalty shoot-out scored); Schröder (penalty shoot-out missed); Lorenz (penalty shoot-out scored); Nolte (penalty shoot-out scored); Zimmermann (penalty shoot-out missed); Nolte (penalty shoot-out scored) | 4–3 | (penalty shoot-out scored) Sangita; (penalty shoot-out scored) Sonika; (penalty shoot-out missed) Navneet; (penalty shoot-out missed) Neha; (penalty shoot-out scored) Lalremsiami; (penalty shoot-out missed) Sangita; (penalty shoot-out missed) Sonika |

Umpires:
Amber Church (NZL)
Wanri Venter (RSA)

==== Third and fourth place ====
19 January 2024
18:30

| India | 0–1 | Japan |
|---|---|---|
| | Report | Urata 6' |

Umpires:
Ayanna McClean (TTO)
Annelize Rostron (RSA)

==== Final ====
19 January 2024
19:30

| Germany | 2–0 | United States |
|---|---|---|
| Fleschütz 3'; Zimmerman 20' | Report |

Umpires:
Rebecca Edwards (ENG)
Kristy Robertson (AUS)

=== Final standings ===
| Pos | Team | Qualification |
|---|---|---|
| 1 | Germany | 2024 Summer Olympics |
| 2 | United States | 2024 Summer Olympics |
| 3 | Japan | 2024 Summer Olympics |
| 4 | India (H) | |
| 5 | New Zealand | |
| 6 | Italy | |
| 7 | Chile | |
| 8 | Czech Republic | |

Source: FIH
(H) Host

=== Awards ===
The following awards were given at the conclusion of the tournament.

| Award | Player |
|---|---|
| Best player | (Germany) Nike Lorenz |
| Top scorers | (Germany) Charlotte Stapenhorst (Germany) Sonja Zimmermann (Germany) Jette Fleschütz |
| Best goalkeeper | (United States) Kelsey Bing |
| Best junior player | (India) Deepika |

=== Goalscorers ===
There were 63 goals scored in 20 matches, for an average of 3.15 goals per match.

4 goals

- (Germany) Jette Fleschütz
- (Germany) Charlotte Stapenhorst
- (Germany) Sonja Zimmermann

3 goals

- (India) Udita Duhan

2 goals

- (Chile) Manuela Urroz
- (Germany) Lisa Nolte
- (Germany) Selin Oruz
- (India) Deepika Kumari
- (Japan) Miyu Hasegawa
- (Japan) Kana Urata
- (New Zealand) Frances Davies
- (United States) Ashley Hoffman
- (United States) Abigail Tamer

1 goal

- (Chile) Camila Caram
- (Chile) Consuelo de las Heras
- (Chile) María Maldonado
- (Chile) Antonia Morales
- (Chile) Francisca Tala
- (Chile) Paula Valdivia
- (Chile) Fernanda Villagrán
- (Germany) Pauline Heinz
- (Germany) Nike Lorenz
- (India) Ishika Chaudhary
- (India) Beauty Dungdung
- (India) Navneet Kaur
- (India) Sangita Kumari
- (India) Salima Tete
- (Italy) Antonella Bruni
- (Italy) Federica Carta
- (Italy) Camila Machín
- (Italy) Ivanna Pessina
- (Japan) Shihori Oikawa
- (Japan) Amiru Shimada
- (Japan) Miyu Suzuki
- (New Zealand) Samantha Child
- (New Zealand) Hannah Cotter
- (New Zealand) Stephanie Dickins
- (New Zealand) Katie Doar
- (New Zealand) Megan Hull
- (New Zealand) Olivia Merry
- (New Zealand) Rose Tynan
- (United States) Ashley Sessa
- (United States) Elizabeth Yeager

Source: FIH

== Tournament 2 ==
2024 Women's FIH Hockey Olympic Qualifiers Spain
Tournament details
- Host country: Spain
- City: Valencia
- Dates: 13–20 January
- Teams: 8 (from 3 confederations)
- Venue: Estadio Beteró

Final positions
- Champions: Belgium
- Runner-up: Spain
- Third place: Great Britain

Tournament statistics
- Matches played: 20
- Goals scored: 89 (4.45 per match)
- Top scorer: (Belgium) Ambre Ballenghien (9 goals)
- Best player: (Belgium) Barbara Nelen
- Best young player: (Belgium) Camille Belis
- Best goalkeeper: (Ireland) Ayeisha McFerran

The tournament was held at the Estadio Beteró in Valencia, Spain from 13 to 20 January 2024. Belgium defeated the hosts Spain 2–1 in the final as they both qualified for the 2024 Summer Olympics. Great Britain defeated Ireland 2–1 and sealed the last qualifying spot in Valencia.

=== Teams ===
- Belgium
- Canada
- Great Britain
- Ireland
- Malaysia
- South Korea
- Spain
- Ukraine

=== Preliminary round ===
==== Pool A ====
| Pos | Team | Pld | W | D | L | GF | GA | GD | Pts | Qualification |
|---|---|---|---|---|---|---|---|---|---|---|
| 1 | Belgium | 3 | 2 | 1 | 0 | 23 | 1 | +22 | 7 | Semi-finals |
| 2 | Ireland | 3 | 2 | 1 | 0 | 11 | 1 | +10 | 7 | Semi-finals |
| 3 | South Korea | 3 | 1 | 0 | 2 | 5 | 13 | −8 | 3 | Classification round |
| 4 | Ukraine | 3 | 0 | 0 | 3 | 0 | 24 | −24 | 0 | Classification round |

Source: FIH
Rules for classification: 1) points; 2) matches won; 3) goal difference; 4) goals for; 5) head-to-head result; 6) field goals for.

All times are local (UTC+1).

13 January 2024
18:30

| Belgium | 0–0 | Ireland |
|---|---|---|
| | Report |

Umpires:
Emi Yamada (JPN)
Maggie Giddens (USA)

13 January 2024
20:45

| South Korea | 3–0 | Ukraine |
|---|---|---|
| Cheon 27', 36'; Park 48' | Report |

Umpires:
Kelly Hudson (NZL)
Rachel Williams (ENG)

15 January 2024
12:00

| Ireland | 8–0 | Ukraine |
|---|---|---|
| Torrans 19', 50'; N. Carey 27'; McLoughlin 33'; Duke 36'; Upton 47'; Harper 49'; Mullan 55' | Report |

Umpires:
Michelle Meister (GER)
Maggie Giddens (USA)

15 January 2024
14:15

| South Korea | 1–10 | Belgium |
|---|---|---|
| Kim J. 52' | Report | Ballenghien 6', 15', 38', 60'; Versavel 16', 56'; Vanden Borre 17'; Marien 24', 57'; Hillewaert 54' |

Umpires:
Rachel Williams (ENG)
Chen Jianjun (CHN)

16 January 2024
17:00

| Belgium | 13–0 | Ukraine |
|---|---|---|
| Ballenghien 4', 30', 30', 46', 47'; Gerniers 23'; Vanden Borre 26', 45'; Struijk 31'; Puvrez 33'; Englebert 48'; Marien 56'; Blockmans 60+' | Report |

Umpires:
Emi Yamada (JPN)
Rachel Williams (ENG)

16 January 2024
19:15

| Ireland | 3–1 | South Korea |
|---|---|---|
| Hawkshaw 34'; Duke 45'; Upton 54' | Report | Cho H. 48' |

Umpires:
Kelly Hudson (NZL)
Ivona Makar (CRO)

==== Pool B ====
| Pos | Team | Pld | W | D | L | GF | GA | GD | Pts | Qualification |
|---|---|---|---|---|---|---|---|---|---|---|
| 1 | Spain (H) | 3 | 3 | 0 | 0 | 13 | 1 | +12 | 9 | Semi-finals |
| 2 | Great Britain | 3 | 2 | 0 | 1 | 10 | 2 | +8 | 6 | Semi-finals |
| 3 | Canada | 3 | 1 | 0 | 2 | 4 | 7 | −3 | 3 | Classification round |
| 4 | Malaysia | 3 | 0 | 0 | 3 | 1 | 18 | −17 | 0 | Classification round |

Source: FIH
Rules for classification: 1) points; 2) matches won; 3) goal difference; 4) goals for; 5) head-to-head result; 6) field goals for.
(H) Hosts

13 January 2024
09:30

| Great Britain | 2–0 | Canada |
|---|---|---|
| Howard 18'; Toman 36' | Report |

Umpires:
Maggie Giddens (USA)
Ivona Makar (CRO)

13 January 2024
11:45

| Spain | 7–0 | Malaysia |
|---|---|---|
| Álvarez 30', 56'; Iglesias 37', 52'; López 41'; S. Barrios 57'; Pérez 60' | Report |

Umpires:
Chen Jianjun (CHN)
Michelle Meister (GER)

14 January 2024
09:30

| Canada | 3–0 | Malaysia |
|---|---|---|
| McManus 3', 45'; Rae 22' | Report |

Umpires:
Rachel Williams (ENG)
Ivona Makar (CRO)

14 January 2024
11:45

| Spain | 1–0 | Great Britain |
|---|---|---|
| Álvarez 51' | Report |

Umpires:
Kelly Hudson (NZL)
Emi Yamada (JPN)

16 January 2024
12:00

| Canada | 1–5 | Spain |
|---|---|---|
| Mollenhauer 14' | Report | Jiménez 47'; S. Barrios 51'; L. Barrios 52'; Iglesias 54'; Álvarez 60' |

Umpires:
Emi Yamada (JPN)
Michelle Meister (GER)

16 January 2024
14:15

| Great Britain | 8–1 | Malaysia |
|---|---|---|
| French 17', 59'; Petter 19'; Howard 24', 30'; Ansley 27', 43'; Jones 29' | Report | Azhar 56' |

Umpires:
Chen Jianjun (CHN)
Maggie Giddens (USA)

=== Classification round ===
Crossover
18 January
South Korea | 3
Malaysia | 0
18 January
Canada | 2
Ukraine | 0

Fifth place
20 January
South Korea | 2
Canada | 1
Seventh place
20 January
Malaysia | 1
Ukraine | 2

==== Crossover ====
18 January 2024
10:00

| South Korea | 3–0 | Malaysia |
|---|---|---|
| Cho H. 33'; Lee Yu-r. 46'; Park 54' | Report |

Umpires:
Chen Jianjun (CHN)
Rachel Williams (ENG)

18 January 2024
18:00

| Canada | 2–0 | Ukraine |
|---|---|---|
| Johansen 45'; Sawers 54' | Report |

Umpires:
Ivona Makar (CRO)
Ilanggo Kanabathu (MAS)

==== Seventh and eighth place ====
20 January 2024
10:00

| Malaysia | 1–2 | Ukraine |
|---|---|---|
| Sukri 60' | Report | Voievoda 45'; Rudychenko 52' |

Umpires:
Chen Jianjun (CHN)
Zeke Newman (AUS)

==== Fifth and sixth place ====
20 January 2024
12:30

| South Korea | 2–1 | Canada |
|---|---|---|
| An S. 26'; Cheon 47' | Report | Husar 20' |

Umpires:
Ivona Makar (CRO)
Maggie Giddens (USA)

=== Medal round ===
Semi-finals
18 January
Spain (pen.) | 0 (3)
Ireland | 0 (0)
18 January
Belgium | 3
Great Britain | 2

Final
20 January
Spain | 1
Belgium | 2
Third place
20 January
Ireland | 1
Great Britain | 2

==== Semi-finals ====
18 January 2024
12:30

| Spain | 0–0 | Ireland |
|---|---|---|
| | Report |
Penalties
| Vidosa (penalty shoot-out missed); Jiménez (penalty shoot-out scored); Strappato (penalty shoot-out scored); López (penalty shoot-out scored) | 3–0 | (penalty shoot-out missed) Upton; (penalty shoot-out missed) Hawkshaw; (penalty shoot-out missed) McLoughlin |

Umpires:
Kelly Hudson (NZL)
Michelle Meister (GER)

18 January 2024
15:30

| Belgium | 3–2 | Great Britain |
|---|---|---|
| Nelen 15'; Vanden Borre 34'; Rasir 55' | Report | Howard 19'; Rayer 57' |

Umpires:
Maggie Giddens (USA)
Emi Yamada (JPN)

==== Third and fourth place ====
20 January 2024
15:30

| Ireland | 1–2 | Great Britain |
|---|---|---|
| McLoughlin 60+' | Report | Jones 18'; K. Robertson 46' |

Umpires:
Kelly Hudson (NZL)
Michelle Meister (GER)

==== Final ====
20 January 2024
18:00

| Spain | 1–2 | Belgium |
|---|---|---|
| S. Barrios 29' | Report | Versavel 56'; Englebert 56' |

Umpires:
Emi Yamada (JPN)
Rachel Williams (ENG)

=== Final standings ===
| Pos | Team | Qualification |
|---|---|---|
| 1 | Belgium | 2024 Summer Olympics |
| 2 | Spain (H) | 2024 Summer Olympics |
| 3 | Great Britain | 2024 Summer Olympics |
| 4 | Ireland | |
| 5 | South Korea | |
| 6 | Canada | |
| 7 | Ukraine | |
| 8 | Malaysia | |

Source: FIH
(H) Host

=== Awards ===
The following awards were given at the conclusion of the tournament.

| Award | Player |
|---|---|
| Best player | (Belgium) Barbara Nelen |
| Top scorer | (Belgium) Ambre Ballenghien |
| Best goalkeeper | (Ireland) Ayeisha McFerran |
| Best junior player | (Belgium) Camille Belis |

=== Goalscorers ===
There were 89 goals scored in 20 matches, for an average of 4.45 goals per match.

9 goals

- (Belgium) Ambre Ballenghien

4 goals

- (Belgium) Stéphanie Vanden Borre
- (United Kingdom) Tessa Howard
- (Spain) Patricia Álvarez

3 goals

- (Belgium) Delphine Marien
- (Belgium) Louise Versavel
- (South Korea) Cheon Eun-bi
- (Spain) Sara Barrios
- (Spain) Belén Iglesias

2 goals

- (Belgium) Charlotte Englebert
- (Canada) Sara McManus
- (United Kingdom) Giselle Ansley
- (United Kingdom) Hannah French
- (United Kingdom) Sarah Jones
- (Ireland) Deirdre Duke
- (Ireland) Hannah McLoughlin
- (Ireland) Sarah Torrans
- (Ireland) Róisín Upton
- (South Korea) Cho Hye-jin
- (South Korea) Park Seung-ae

1 goal

- (Belgium) Vanessa Blockmans
- (Belgium) Alix Gerniers
- (Belgium) Lien Hillewaert
- (Belgium) Barbara Nelen
- (Belgium) Emma Puvrez
- (Belgium) Justine Rasir
- (Belgium) Michelle Struijk
- (Canada) Danielle Husar
- (Canada) Karli Johansen
- (Canada) Anna Mollenhauer
- (Canada) Thora Rae
- (Canada) Audrey Sawers
- (United Kingdom) Isabelle Petter
- (United Kingdom) Elena Rayer
- (United Kingdom) Katie Robertson
- (United Kingdom) Anna Toman
- (Ireland) Niamh Carey
- (Ireland) Bethany Harper
- (Ireland) Sarah Hawkshaw
- (Ireland) Kathryn Mullan
- (Malaysia) Nur Azhar
- (Malaysia) Fatin Sukri
- (South Korea) An Su-jin
- (South Korea) Kim Jeong-ihn
- (South Korea) Lee Yu-ri
- (Spain) Laura Barrios
- (Spain) Lucía Jiménez
- (Spain) María López García
- (Spain) Beatriz Pérez
- (Ukraine) Valeriia Rudychenko
- (Ukraine) Anastasiia Voievoda

Source: FIH

== See also ==
- 2024 Men's FIH Hockey Olympic Qualifiers
