= 2022 Women's FIH Hockey Nations Cup =

Women's field hockey tournament held in Spain

Tournament details
- Host country: Spain
- City: Valencia
- Dates: 11–17 December
- Teams: 8 (from 4 confederations)
- Venue: Estadio Betero

Final positions
- Champions: India (1st title)
- Runner-up: Spain
- Third place: Japan

Tournament statistics
- Matches played: 20
- Goals scored: 50 (2.5 per match)
- Top scorer: (Ireland) Katie Mullan (3 goals)
- Best player: (Spain) Lucía Jiménez Vicente
- Best young player: (Ireland) Sarah McAuley
- Best goalkeeper: (India) Savita Punia

The 2022 Women's FIH Hockey Nations Cup was the first edition of the Women's FIH Hockey Nations Cup, the annual qualification tournament for the Women's FIH Pro League organised by the International Hockey Federation. The tournament was held at the Estadio Betero in Valencia, Spain from 11 to 17 December 2022.

India as the winner, was promoted for the 2023–24 Women's FIH Pro League.

== Teams ==
The eight highest ranked teams not participating in the Women's FIH Pro League participated in the tournament: Canada withdrew from the tournament and was replaced by Chile.

Chile

Head Coach: (Argentina) Sergio Vigil

2. Doménica Ananías
3. Fernanda Villagrán
4. Monserrat Obon
5. Denise Rojas
6. Fernanda Flores
7. Sofía Filipek
10. Manuela Urroz
13. Camila Caram (C)
14. Francisca Tala
19. Agustina Solano
20. Francisca Parra
22. Paula Valdivia
25. María Maldonado
26. Fernanda Arrieta
27. Amanda Martínez
28. Natalia Salvador (GK)
29. Montserrat Araya (GK)
30. Josefina Khamis
31. Laura Müller
42. Francisca Irazoqui
India

Head Coach: (Netherlands) Janneke Schopman

1. Navjot Kaur
2. Gurjit Kaur
3. Deep Grace Ekka
4. Monika Malik
5. Sonika Tandi
8. Nikki Pradhan
11. Savita Punia (C, GK)
14. Sangita Kumari
15. Nisha Warsi
16. Vandana Katariya
17. Bichu Devi Kharibam (GK)
18. Udita Duhan
20. Lalremsiami
24. Jyoti
25. Navneet Kaur
27. Sushila Chanu
30. Salima Tete
32. Neha Goyal
50. Ishika Chaudhary
52. Beauty Dungdung
Ireland

Head Coach: (Australia) Sean Dancer

2. Elizabeth Murphy (GK)
3. Sarah McAuley
4. Zara Malseed
5. Michelle Carey
6. Róisín Upton
7. Niamh Carey
8. Sarah Hawkshaw
9. Kathryn Mullan (C)
10. Hannah McLoughlin
11. Sarah Torrans
12. Elena Tice
13. Naomi Carroll
16. Charlotte Beggs
19. Caoimhe Perdue
21. Katie McKee
23. Holly Micklem (GK)
24. Erin Getty
32. Siofra O'Brien
29. Ellen Curran
52. Christina Hamill
Italy

Head Coach: (Netherlands) Robert Justus

1. Sofia Monserrat (GK)
3. Teresa Dalla Vittoria
4. Ilaria Sarnari
5. Ailin Oviedo
6. Augustina Hasselstrom
7. Elettra Bormida
9. Emilia Munitis
12. Lucía Ines Caruso (GK)
13. Agueda Moroni
14. Anotnella Bruni
15. Sofía Maldonado
18. Federica Carta (C)
21. Sara Puglisi (C)
22. Mercedes Pastor
26. Sofia Laurito
27. Lara Oviedo
28. Ivanna Pessina
29. Luciana Gallimberti
30. Camila Machín
44. Chiara di Bella
Japan

Head Coach: (India) Jude Menezes

1. Eika Nakamura (GK)
5. Yu Asai
7. Miyu Suzuki
8. Moeka Tsubouchi
9. Yuri Nagai (C)
10. Hazuki Nagai
11. Shihori Oikawa
13. Miki Kozuka
15. Chiko Fujibayashi
16. Akari Nakagomi
17. Shiho Kobayakawa
19. Kanon Mori
21. Mai Toriyama
23. Saki Tanaka
24. Mami Karino
26. Amiru Shimada
27. Akio Tanaka (GK)
28. Rui Takashima
32. Jyunon Kawai
33. Sara Yoshihara
South Korea

Head Coach: Han Jin-soo

2. Lee Ju-yeon (GK)
3. Kim Eun-ji
7. Seo Jung-eun
8. An Hyo-ju
10. Cheon Eun-bi (C)
11. Cho Hye-jin
12. Kim Seo-na
14. Lee Yu-ri
16. Kim Jeong-in
17. Seo Su-young
19. Kim Min-jeong
20. Yoon Da-eun
22. An Su-jin
23. Choi Min-young
24. Park Seung-ae
27. Pak Ho-jeong
28. Choi Ji-yun
29. Lee Yu-jin
30. Lee Jin-min (GK)
31. Kim Eun-ji (GK)
South Africa

Head Coach: Giles Bonnet

1. Anelle van Deventer (GK)
8. Kristen Paton
10. Onthatile Zulu
16. Erin Christie (C)
17. Charné Maddocks
18. Hannah Pearce
21. Ongeziwe Mali
25. Kirsty Adams
28. Quanita Bobbs
29. Tarryn Lombard
31. Bianca Wood
33. Marlize van Tonder (GK)
35. Jean-Leigh du Toit
39. Stephanie Botha
42. Marié Louw
43. Kayla Swarts
44. Taheera Augousti
45. Ntsopa Mokoena
Spain

Head Coach: (England) Adrian Lock

2. Laura Barrios
4. Sara Barrios
6. Clara Badia
7. Júlia Strappato
8. Lucía Jiménez
9. María López (C)
10. Belén Iglesias
11. Marta Segú
12. Florencia Amundson
13. Constanza Amundson
15. Maialen García
16. Candela Mejías
17. Clara Ycart
20. Xantal Giné
21. Beatriz Pérez
22. Laia Vidosa
24. Alejandra Torres-Quevedo
26. Clara Pérez (GK)
30. Patricia Álvarez
32. Jana Martínez (GK)

== Preliminary round ==
The match schedule was announced on 5 September 2022.

=== Pool A ===
Pos	Team	Pld	W	D	L	GF	GA	GD	Pts	Qualification
1	Spain (H)	3	2	1	0	5	0	+5	7	Semi-finals
2	Ireland	3	1	1	1	4	5	−1	4	Semi-finals
3	Italy	3	0	2	1	2	3	−1	2	
4	South Korea	3	0	2	1	3	6	−3	2	

Source: FIH
Rules for classification: 1) points; 2) matches won; 3) goal difference; 4) goals for; 5) head-to-head result; 6) field goals scored.
(H) Hosts

11 December 2022
10:45

South Korea	1–1	Italy
Cheon 11'	Report	Carta 6'

Umpires:
Durga Devi (IND)
Junko Wagatsuma (JPN)

11 December 2022
13:00

Spain	2–0	Ireland
Ycart 2'; Torres-Quevedo 31'	Report

Umpires:
Liu Xiaoying (CHN)
Kristy Robertson (AUS)

12 December 2022
10:45

Ireland	2–1	Italy
Carroll 35'; Mullan 44'	Report	L. Oviedo 60'

Umpires:
Natalia Lodeiro (URU)
Ymkje van Slooten (NED)

12 December 2022
13:00

South Korea	0–3	Spain
	Report	F. Amundson 3', 54'; Álvarez 12'

Umpires:
Magali Sergeant (BEL)
Junko Wagatsuma (JPN)

14 December 2022
10:45

Ireland	2–2	South Korea
Hawkshaw 36'; Mullan 53'	Report	Cho 57'; An 59'

Umpires:
Kristy Robertson (AUS)
Ymkje van Slooten (NED)

14 December 2022
13:00

Spain	0–0	Italy
	Report

Umpires:
Vilma Bagdanskienė (LTU)
Durga Devi (IND)

=== Pool B ===
Pos	Team	Pld	W	D	L	GF	GA	GD	Pts	
1	India	3	3	0	0	7	2	+5	9	Semi-finals
2	Japan	3	1	1	1	4	4	0	4	Semi-finals
3	Chile (Note: Chile replaced Canada, who withdrew.)	3	1	1	1	4	5	−1	4	
4	South Africa	3	0	0	3	2	6	−4	0	

Source: FIH
Rules for classification: 1) points; 2) matches won; 3) goal difference; 4) goals for; 5) head-to-head result; 6) field goals scored.
Notes:

11 December 2022
15:15

India	3–1	Chile
Sangita 3'; Sonika 11'; Navneet 32'	Report	Villagrán 44'

Umpires:
Mariana Reydo (ARG)
Magali Sergeant (BEL)

11 December 2022
17:30

Japan	2–1	South Africa
Oikawa 7'; Toriyama 56'	Report	Bobbs 12'

Umpires:
Vilma Bagdanskienė (LTU)
Natalia Lodeiro (URU)

12 December 2022
15:15

Japan	1–2	India
Takashima 49'	Report	Salima 5'; Beauty 40'

Umpires:
Liu Xiaoying (CHN)
Mariana Reydi (ARG)

12 December 2022
17:30

Chile	2–1	South Africa
Urroz 18'; Villagrán 60'	Report	Mokoena 16'

Umpires:
Vilma Bagdanskienė (LTU)
Ana Faias (POR)

14 December 2022
15:15

India	2–0	South Africa
Deep Grace 14'; Gurjit 59'	Report

Umpires:
Ana Faias (POR)
Natalia Lodeiro (URU)

14 December 2022
17:30

Chile	1–1	Japan
Arrieta 23'	Report	Yoshihara 21'

Umpires:
Liu Xiaoying (CHN)
Magali Sergeant (BEL)

== Classification round ==
=== Bracket ===
5–8th place semi-finals
16 December
Italy	2
South Africa	0
16 December
Chile	0
South Korea	1

Fifth place
17 December
Italy (p.s.o.)	1 (2)
South Korea	1 (1)
Seventh place
17 December
South Africa	1
Chile	4

=== 5–8th place semifinals ===
16 December 2022
09:00

Italy	2–0	South Africa
Pessina 4'; L. Oviedo 52'	Report

Umpires:
Vilma Bagdanskienė (LTU)
Ymkje van Slooten (NED)

16 December 2022
11:15

Chile	0–1	South Korea
	Report	Lee Yu-j. 49'

Umpires:
Ana Faias (POR)
Durga Devi (IND)

=== Seventh and eighth place ===
17 December 2022
09:00

South Africa	1–4	Chile
Christie 29'	Report	Maldonado 27'; Losada 53'; Tala 56'; Arrieta 58'

Umpires:
Durga Devi (IND)
Ana Faias (POR)

=== Fifth and sixth place ===
17 December 2022
11:15

Italy	1–1	South Korea
Carta 33'	Report	Cho 52'
Penalties
Pessina (penalty shoot-out missed); Moroni (penalty shoot-out scored); Pastor (penalty shoot-out missed); Laurito (penalty shoot-out scored)	2–1	(penalty shoot-out missed) Kim S. (penalty shoot-out missed) An H. (penalty shoot-out missed) Cheon; (penalty shoot-out scored) Lee Yu-j. (penalty shoot-out missed) Seo J.

Umpires:
Natalia Lodeiro (URU)
Ymkje van Slooten (NED)

== Final round ==
=== Bracket ===
Semi-finals
16 December
Spain	1
Japan	0
16 December
India (p.s.o.)	1 (2)
Ireland	1 (1)

Final
17 December
Spain	0
India	1
Third place
17 December
Japan	3
Ireland	2

=== Semi-finals ===
16 December 2022
13:30

Spain	1–0	Japan
S. Barrios 14'	Report

Umpires:
Mariana Reydo (ARG)
Kristy Robertson (AUS)

16 December 2022
15:45

India	1–1	Ireland
Udita 45'	Report	Carroll 15'
Penalties
Salima (penalty shoot-out missed); Lalremsiami (penalty shoot-out scored); Navneet (penalty shoot-out missed); Sonika (penalty shoot-out scored); Neha (penalty shoot-out missed)	2–1	(penalty shoot-out missed) Hamill; (penalty shoot-out missed) Curran; (penalty shoot-out scored) McLoughlin; (penalty shoot-out missed) Upton; (penalty shoot-out missed) Mullan

Umpires:
Liu Xiaoying (CHN)
Junko Wagatsuma (JPN)

=== Third and fourth place ===
17 December 2022
13:30

Japan	3–2	Ireland
Karino 39'; Toriyama 40'; Y. Nagai 56'	Report	Mullan 35'; N. Carey 40'

Umpires:
Kristy Robertson (AUS)
Magali Sergeant (BEL)

=== Final ===
17 December 2022
15:45

Spain	0–1	India
	Report	Gurjit 6'

Umpires:
Mariana Reydo (ARG)
Junko Wagatsuma (JPN)

== Awards ==
The awards were announced on 17 December 2022.

Award	Player
Player of the tournament	(Spain) Lucía Jiménez Vicente
Goalkeeper of the tournament	(India) Savita Punia
Young player of the tournament	(Ireland) Sarah McAuley

== Final standings ==
As per statistical convention in field hockey, matches decided in extra time are counted as wins and losses, while matches decided by penalty shoot-outs are counted as draws.

Pos	Team	Pld	W	D	L	GF	GA	GD	Pts	Status
1st place, gold medalist(s)	India	5	4	1	0	9	3	+6	13	Qualified for 2023–24 FIH Pro League
2nd place, silver medalist(s)	Spain	5	3	1	1	6	1	+5	10	
3rd place, bronze medalist(s)	Japan	5	2	1	2	7	7	0	7	
4	Ireland	5	1	2	2	7	9	−2	5	
5	Italy	5	1	3	1	5	4	+1	6	
6	South Korea	5	1	3	1	5	7	−2	6	
7	Chile	5	2	1	2	8	7	+1	7	
8	South Africa	5	0	0	5	3	12	−9	0	

Source: FIH

== Goalscorers ==
There were 50 goals scored in 20 matches, for an average of 2.5 goals per match.

3 goals

- (Ireland) Kathryn Mullan

2 goals

- (Chile) Fernanda Arrieta
- (Chile) Fernanda Villagrán
- (India) Gurjit Kaur
- (Ireland) Naomi Carroll
- (Italy) Federica Carta
- (Italy) Lara Oviedo
- (Japan) Mai Toriyama
- (South Korea) Cho Hye-jin
- (Spain) Florencia Amundson

1 goal

- (Chile) Denise Losada
- (Chile) María Maldonado
- (Chile) Francisca Tala
- (Chile) Manuela Urroz
- (India) Beauty Dungdung
- (India) Udita Duhan
- (India) Deep Grace Ekka
- (India) Navneet Kaur
- (India) Sangita Kumari
- (India) Sonika Tandi
- (India) Salima Tete
- (Ireland) Niamh Carey
- (Ireland) Sarah Hawkshaw
- (Italy) Ivanna Pessina
- (Japan) Mami Karino
- (Japan) Yuri Nagai
- (Japan) Shihori Oikawa
- (Japan) Rui Takashima
- (Japan) Sara Yoshihara
- (South Africa) Quanita Bobbs
- (South Africa) Erin Christie
- (South Africa) Ntsopa Mokoena
- (South Korea) An Su-jin
- (South Korea) Cheon Eun-bi
- (South Korea) Lee Yu-jin
- (Spain) Patricia Álvarez
- (Spain) Alejandra Torres-Quevedo
- (Spain) Clara Ycart
- (Spain) Sara Barrios

Source: FIH

== See also ==
- 2022 Men's FIH Hockey Nations Cup
