= 2015 Girls' EuroHockey Youth Championships =

Tournament details
- Host country: Spain
- City: Santander
- Dates: 19–25 July
- Teams: 8 (from 1 confederation)
- Venue: Ruth Beitia Municipal Sports Complex

Final positions
- Champions: Netherlands (6th title)
- Runner-up: Germany
- Third place: England

Tournament statistics
- Matches played: 20
- Goals scored: 112 (5.6 per match)
- Top scorer: (Netherlands) Michelle Fillet (10 goals)
- Best player: (Netherlands) Pien Sanders

The 2015 Girls' EuroHockey Youth Championships was the eighth edition of the Girls' EuroHockey Youth Championship. The tournament was held from 19 to 25 July 2015 in Santander, Spain at the Ruth Beitia Municipal Sports Complex.

Netherlands won the tournament for the sixth time after defeating Germany 6–1 in the final.

== Qualified teams ==
The following teams participated in the 2015 EuroHockey Youth Championship:

Dates	Event	Location	Quotas	Qualifier(s)
–	Host		1	Spain
29 July–4 August 2013	2013 EuroHockey Youth Championship	Dublin, Ireland	6	Belgium; England; France; Germany; Netherlands; Russia
–	2013 EuroHockey Youth Championship II	Santander, Spain	1	Scotland
Total			8	

== Format ==
The eight teams were split into two groups of four teams. The top two teams advanced to the semifinals to determine the winner in a knockout system. The bottom two teams played in a new group with the teams they did not play against in the group stage. The last two teams were relegated to the EuroHockey Youth Championship II.

== Preliminary round ==
=== Pool A ===
Pos	Team	Pld	W	D	L	GF	GA	GD	Pts	Qualification
1	Netherlands	3	3	0	0	27	2	+25	9	Semi-finals
2	Belgium	3	2	0	1	10	10	0	6	Semi-finals
3	France	3	1	0	2	2	13	−11	3	
4	Scotland	3	0	0	3	0	14	−14	0	

Source: EuroHockey
Rules for classification: 1) points; 2) goal difference; 3) goals scored; 4) head-to-head result.

19 July 2015
09:45

Netherlands	9–2	Belgium
Fortuin 8'; Fillet 22', 66'; Burg 25', 62'; Mink 44', 48'; Van Laarhoven 57'; Van der Elst 64'	Report	Sistermans 28'; Vanmechelen 58'

Umpires:
Fiona Davitt (IRE)
Rachel Williams (ENG)

19 July 2015
12:00

France	1–0	Scotland
Verrier 30'	Report

Umpires:
Angelika Koppen (GER)
Atteneri Naomi Ortíz Monzón (ESP)

20 July 2015
13:15

Belgium	5–0	Scotland
Raymakers 17'; Jakus 19'; Ikegwuonu 21', 67'; Vanmechelen 62'	Report

Umpires:
Rachel Williams (ENG)
Angelika Koppen (GER)

20 July 2015
15:30

France	0–10	Netherlands
	Report	Leemans 12', 20'; Fillet 15', 48', 65'; Van Laarhoven 25'; Burg 26', 39'; Van der Elst 49'; Fortuin 62'

Umpires:
Svetlana Cherepanova (RUS)
Atteneri Naomi Ortíz Monzón (ESP)

22 July 2015
10:45

Netherlands	8–0	Scotland
Sanders 3', 39'; Fillet 13', 63'; Verschoor 20'; Van der Hoek 21'; Burg 31'; Mink 53'	Report

Umpires:
Svetlana Cherepanova (RUS)
Elodie Franchomme (FRA)

22 July 2015
13:00

Belgium	3–1	France
Masso 24'; Limauge 42'; Ikegwuonu 52'	Report	Verrier 68'

Umpires:
Rachel Williams (ENG)
Fiona Davitt (IRE)

=== Pool B ===
Pos	Team	Pld	W	D	L	GF	GA	GD	Pts	Qualification
1	Germany	3	3	0	0	19	4	+15	9	Semi-finals
2	England	3	1	1	1	5	5	0	4	Semi-finals
3	Spain (H)	3	1	1	1	5	6	−1	4	
4	Russia	3	0	0	3	2	16	−14	0	

Source: EuroHockey
Rules for classification: 1) points; 2) goal difference; 3) goals scored; 4) head-to-head result.
(H) Hosts

19 July 2015
17:00

Germany	11–1	Russia
Micheel 4', 8', 41'; Brüning 10', 17'; Marquardt 28', 57', 69'; Granitzki 35+'; Zimmermann 44'; Heyn 51'	Report	Bogatyreva 9'

Umpires:
Anne van den Bosch (BEL)
Alex Walker (SCO)

19 July 2015
20:00

England	1–1	Spain
Bathurst 24'	Report	Bruguera 32'

Umpires:
Maartje de Bruijn (NED)
Elodie Franchomme (FRA)

21 July 2015
15:30

England	1–4	Germany
Calnan 16'	Report	Vivot 18', 27'; Micheel 55'; Zink 65'

Umpires:
Alex Walker (SCO)
Maartje de Bruijn (NED)

21 July 2015
17:45

Russia	1–2	Spain
Serova 40'	Report	López Llauder 32'; Álvarez 63'

Umpires:
Fiona Davitt (IRE)
Anne van den Bosch (BEL)

22 July 2015
15:30

Russia	0–3	England
	Report	Hunt 27'; Sanders 40'; Daly 61'

Umpires:
Angelika Koppen (GER)
Alex Walker (SCO)

22 July 2015
17:45

Germany	4–2	Spain
Meffert 11', 24'; Brüning 19'; Zink 43'	Report	F. Amundson 27'; Álvarez 44'

Umpires:
Anne van den Bosch (BEL)
Maartje de Bruijn (NED)

== Fifth to eighth place classification ==
=== Pool C ===
Pos	Team	Pld	W	D	L	GF	GA	GD	Pts	Relegation
1	Spain (H)	3	3	0	0	9	1	+8	9	
2	Russia	3	2	0	1	11	5	+6	6	
3	France (R)	3	1	0	2	2	7	−5	3	EuroHockey Youth Championship II
4	Scotland (R)	3	0	0	3	2	11	−9	0	EuroHockey Youth Championship II

Source: EuroHockey
Rules for classification: 1) points; 2) goal difference; 3) goals scored; 4) head-to-head result.
(H) Hosts; (R) Relegated

24 July 2015
10:30

Scotland	2–6	Russia
MacKinnon 40'; Steiger 61'	Report	Borisova 12', 16', 32', 54'; Karandashova 34'; Zelenova 50'

Umpires:
Elodie Franchomme (FRA)
Fiona Davitt (IRE)

24 July 2015
13:00

France	0–3	Spain
	Report	Jiménez 20'; Abelairas Ramos 35'; F. Amundson 59'

Umpires:
Svetlana Cherepanova (RUS)
Maartje de Bruijn (NED)

25 July 2015
09:00

France	1–4	Russia
Verrier 2'	Report	Zelenova 27'; Serova 49'; Nikolaishvili 56'; Borisova 66'

Umpires:
Fiona Davitt (IRE)
Angelika Koppen (GER)

25 July 2015
09:30

Scotland	0–4	Spain
	Report	F. Amundson 32'; Álvarez 37', 68'; Ycart 45'

Umpires:
Anne van den Bosch (BEL)
Elodie Franchomme (FRA)

== First to fourth place classification ==
=== Bracket ===
Semi-finals
24 July
Belgium	0
Germany	7
24 July
Netherlands	6
England	0

Final
25 July
Germany	1
Netherlands	6
Third place
25 July
Belgium	0
England	2

=== Semi-finals ===
24 July 2015
10:00

Belgium	0–7	Germany
	Report	Micheel 2'; Granitzki 38'; Brüning 39', 47'; Meffert 58'; Pluta 66'; Zink 69'

Umpires:
Rachel Williams (ENG)
Alex Walker (SCO)

24 July 2015
12:00

Netherlands	6–0	England
Sanders 4'; Van der Veld 21'; Fillet 30', 54'; Mink 59'; Renders 69'	Report

Umpires:
Anne van den Bosch (BEL)
Angelika Koppen (GER)

=== Third and fourth place ===
25 July 2015
14:00

Belgium	0–2	England
	Report	Bathurst 18'; Calnan 59'

Umpires:
Maartje de Bruijn (NED)
Svetlana Cherepanova (RUS)

=== Final ===
25 July 2015
17:00

Germany	1–6	Netherlands
Marquardt 48'	Report	Fillet 30'; Van der Elst 32', 58'; Fortuin 37'; Van der Hoek 43'; Mink 65'

Umpires:
Rachel Williams (ENG)
Alex Walker (SCO)

== Statistics ==
=== Awards ===
Player of the Tournament	Top Goalscorer	Goalkeeper of the Tournament	Fair Play
(Netherlands) Pien Sanders	(Netherlands) Michelle Fillet	(France) Zoe Agrain	Scotland

=== Final standings ===
Pos	Team	Relegation
1st place, gold medalist(s)	Netherlands (C)	
2nd place, silver medalist(s)	Germany	
3rd place, bronze medalist(s)	England	
4	Belgium	
5	Spain (H)	
6	Russia	
7	France (R)	Youth Championship II
8	Scotland (R)	Youth Championship II

Source: EHF
(C) Champion; (H) Host; (R) Relegated

=== Goalscorers ===
There were 112 goals scored in 20 matches, for an average of 5.6 goals per match.

10 goals

- (Netherlands) Michelle Fillet

5 goals

- (Germany) Julia Brüning
- (Germany) Lena Micheel
- (Netherlands) Joosje Burg
- (Netherlands) Minout Mink
- (Russia) Valeriia Borisova

4 goals

- (Germany) Maxi Marquardt
- (Netherlands) Fay van der Elst
- (Spain) Patricia Álvarez

3 goals

- (Belgium) Shaunda Ikegwuonu
- (France) Gabrielle Verrier
- (Germany) Julia Meffert
- (Germany) Alexandra Zink
- (Netherlands) Kyra Fortuin
- (Netherlands) Pien Sanders
- (Spain) Florencia Amundson

2 goals

- (Belgium) Lissa Vanmechelen
- (England) Georgina Bathurst
- (England) Charlotte Calnan
- (Germany) Hanna Granitzki
- (Germany) Alisa Vivot
- (Netherlands) Yentl Leemans
- (Netherlands) Imme van der Hoek
- (Netherlands) Renée van Laarhoven
- (Russia) Varvara Serova
- (Russia) Viktoriia Zelenova

1 goal

- (Belgium) Carolien Jakus
- (Belgium) Sophie Limauge
- (Belgium) Alexia Masso
- (Belgium) Mathilde Raymakers
- (Belgium) Damy Sistermans
- (England) Charlotte Daly
- (England) Holly Hunt
- (England) Erica Sanders
- (Germany) Naomi Heyn
- (Germany) Nicola Pluta
- (Germany) Sonja Zimmermann
- (Netherlands) Maud Renders
- (Netherlands) Hester van der Veld
- (Netherlands) Julia Verschoor
- (Russia) Alena Bogatyreva
- (Russia) Victoria Karandashova
- (Russia) Ekaterina Nikolaishvili
- (Scotland) Leia MacKinnon
- (Scotland) Millie Steiger
- (Spain) Peppa Abelairas Ramos
- (Spain) Laura Bruguera
- (Spain) Lucía Jiménez
- (Spain) Clara López Llauder
- (Spain) Clara Ycart

Source: EuroHockey
