= Fay van der Elst =

Dutch field hockey player

Personal information
- Born: 7 February 1998 (age 28) Blaricum, Netherlands

Sport
- Sport: Field hockey
- Position: Forward
Senior career
Years	Team	Caps	Goals
–	Amsterdam	-	-
National team
Years	Team	Caps	Goals
2017–2019	Netherlands U–21	10	(1)
2023–	Netherlands	16	(12)
Medal record
Women's field hockey
Representing Netherlands
EuroHockey Championship
Gold medal – first place	2025 Mönchengladbach
FIH Pro League
Gold medal – first place	Season Five
EuroHockey Junior Championship
Gold medal – first place	2017 Valencia
Silver medal – second place	2019 Valencia
EuroHockey Youth Championship
Gold medal – first place	2015 Santander
Gold medal – first place	2016 Cork

Fay van der Elst (born 2 February 1998) is a Dutch field hockey player.

== Personal life ==
Fay van der Elst was born and raised in Blaricum.

== Career ==
=== Domestic hockey ===
In the Netherlands' domestic league, the Hoofdklasse, Van der Elst represents Amsterdam.

=== Under–18 ===
Van der Elst made her international debut at U–18 level. She won back-to-back gold medals with the Netherlands at the 2015 and 2016 editions of the EuroHockey Youth Championship, held in Santander and Cork, respectively.

=== Under–21 ===
Following her U–18 career, Van der Elst transitioned into the junior national team. She made her first appearance with the side in 2017, winning gold at the EuroHockey Junior Championship in Valencia.

She won her second EuroHockey Junior Championship medal in 2019, taking home silver at the tournament held in Valencia.

=== Senior ===
After not receiving any international call-ups in four years, Van der Elst made her return to international hockey in 2023. She was named in the national squad for season five of the FIH Pro League. She made her first international appearance in December during an FIH Pro League match against Great Britain, and also scored on debut.

==== International goals ====
Goal	Date	Location	Opponent	Score	Result	Competition	Ref.
1	7 December 2023	Polideportivo Provincial, Santiago del Estero, Argentina	Great Britain	7–0	8–0	2023–24 FIH Pro League	
2	4 February 2024	Kalinga Stadium, Bhubaneswar, India	India	2–1	3–1	2023–24 FIH Pro League	
