= Clara Badia =

Spanish field hockey player (born 1998)

Personal information
- Full name: Clara Badia Bogner
- Born: 5 February 1998 (age 28) Terrassa, Spain

Sport
- Sport: Field hockey
- Position: Midfield
Senior career
Years	Team	Caps	Goals
2021–2023	Mannheimer	-	-
2023–2024	Atlètic Terrassa	-	-
2024–	Mannheimer	-	-
National team
Years	Team	Caps	Goals
2017–2019	Spain U–21	9	(0)
2022–	Spain	18	(0)
Medal record
Women's field hockey
Representing Spain
EuroHockey Championship
Bronze medal – third place	2025 Mönchengladbach
FIH Nations Cup
Silver medal – second place	2022–23 Valencia
EuroHockey U21 Championship
Gold medal – first place	2019 Valencia

Clara Badia Bogner (born 5 February 1998) is a Spanish field and indoor hockey player from Catalonia.

== Personal life ==
Clara Badia was born and raised in Terrassa.

== Field hockey ==
=== Domestic league ===
Badia currently plays in the German Bundesliga and Euro Hockey League for Mannheimer.

She has also previously represented Atlètic Terrassa the Liga Iberdrola.

=== Under–21 ===
Badia captained the history making Spanish U–21 team in 2019 that won gold at the EuroHockey U–21 Championship in Valencia.

=== Red Sticks ===
In 2022, Badia made her senior international debut for Las Redsticks. She made her first appearance in an FIH Pro League match against the Netherlands. She also made her major tournament debut later that year, winning a silver medal at the FIH Nations Cup in Valencia.

Badia has been a reserve at both the 2023–24 FIH Nations Cup in Terrassa and the 2024 Summer Olympics in Paris.

She is a member of the 2025 national squad.
