= Constanza Amundson =

Spanish field hockey player (born 1998)

Personal information
- Full name: Constanza Amundson Téves
- Born: 12 February 1998 (age 28)

Sport
- Sport: Field hockey
- Position: Defence
- Club: Real Club de Polo
National team
Years	Team	Caps	Goals
2015–2026	Spain U–18	10	(0)
2016–2019	Spain U–21	18	(1)
2021–	Spain	1	(0)
Medal record
Women's field hockey
Representing Spain
EuroHockey Championship
Bronze medal – third place	2025 Mönchengladbach
EuroHockey Junior Championship
Gold medal – first place	2019 Valencia

Constanza Amundson Téves (Note: In this Spanish name, the first or paternal surname is Amundson and the second or maternal family name is Téves.) (born 12 February 1998) is a Spanish field hockey player.

== Personal life ==
Constanza Amundson has a twin sister, Florencia, who also plays field hockey for Spain.

== Career ==
=== Club level ===
In club competition, Amundson plays for Real Club de Polo in the Liga Iberdrola.

=== Junior national teams ===
Constanza Amundson has represented Spain in junior hockey at both Under–18 and Under–21 levels.

==== Under–18 ====
Amundson made her first appearance for the Spain U–18 team in 2015 at the EuroHockey Youth Championship in Santander.

The following year she represented the team at another EuroHockey Youth Championship, held in Cork.

==== Under–21 ====
She made her debut for the Spanish U–21 team in 2016. She first represented the side in a 5–Nations Tournament in Valencia. Later that year, she went on to compete at the FIH Junior World Cup in Santiago.

She represented the team again in 2017 at the EuroHockey Junior Championship in Valencia.

In 2019 she made her final appearance with the junior national team. She was a member of the side the achieved an historic gold medal at the EuroHockey Junior Championships in Valencia.

=== Las Redsticks ===
Constanza Amundson made her senior international debut for Las Redsticks in 2021, during season three of the FIH Pro League.
