= Laia Vidosa =

Spanish field hockey player (born 1999)

Personal information
- Full name: Laia Vidosa Artigas
- Born: 8 January 1999 (age 27) Barcelona, Spain

Sport
- Sport: Field hockey
- Position: Midfield
Senior career
Years	Team	Caps	Goals
–	Junior	-	-
National team
Years	Team	Caps	Goals
2017–2019	Spain U–21	5	(0)
2022–	Spain	37	(1)
Medal record
Women's field hockey
Representing Spain
EuroHockey Championship
Bronze medal – third place	2025 Mönchengladbach
FIH Nations Cup
Gold medal – first place	2023–24 Terrassa
Silver medal – second place	2022–23 Valencia
EuroHockey U21 Championship
Gold medal – first place	2019 Valencia

Laia Vidosa Artigas (born 8 January 1999) is a field and indoor hockey player from Spain.

== Personal life ==
Laia Vidosa was born and raised in Barcelona.

== Field hockey ==
=== Domestic league ===
In the Liga Iberdrola and Euro Hockey League, Vidosa represents Junior FC.

=== Under–21 ===
Vidosa was a member of the history making Spanish U–21 team in 2019 that won gold at the EuroHockey U–21 Championship in Valencia.

=== Red Sticks ===
In 2022, Vidosa made her senior international debut for Las Redsticks. She made her first appearance in an FIH Pro League match against the Netherlands. She also made her major tournament debut later that year, winning a silver medal at the FIH Nations Cup in Valencia.

Throughout 2024, Vidosa was an instrumental member of the national squad. She helped the team secure an Olympic berth, with a silver medal performance at the FIH Olympic Qualifiers in Valencia. She was also a member of the gold medal-winning squad at the FIH Nations Cup in Terrassa.

Vidosa has been a reserve at 2024 Summer Olympics in Paris.

She is a member of the 2025 national squad.

==== International goals ====
Goal	Date	Location	Opponent	Score	Result	Competition	Ref.
1	27 July 2023	Estadi Marti Colomer, Terrassa, Spain	India	2–1	2–2	Test Match	
