= Elodie Picard =

Belgian field hockey player

Personal information
- Born: 8 September 1997 (age 29) Belgium

Sport
- Sport: Field hockey
- Position: Goalkeeper
- Club: Royal Antwerp HC
National team
Years	Team	Caps	Goals
2015	Belgium U18	5	(0)
2016–2017	Belgium U21	5	(0)
2018–	Belgium	22	(0)
Medal record
Women's field hockey
Representing Belgium
World Cup
Bronze medal – third place	2026 Wavre/Amstelveen
European Championship
Bronze medal – third place	2021 Amstelveen
EuroHockey Junior Championship
Silver medal – second place	2017 Valencia

Elodie Picard (born 8 September 1997) is a field hockey player from Belgium, who plays as a goalkeeper.

== Career ==
=== Club hockey ===
In the Belgian Hockey League, Picard plays club hockey for Royal Antwerp HC.

=== National teams ===
==== Under–18 ====
In 2015, Elodie Picard was a member of the Belgium U–18 team at the EuroHockey Youth Championship in Santander.

==== Under–21 ====
Picard won her first medal with Belgium in 2017 as a member of the Under–21 side. She represented the team at the EuroHockey Junior Championship in Valencia. The team finished second, taking home a silver medal.

==== Red Panthers ====
Elodie Picard made her debut for the Belgium 'Red Panthers' in 2018 during a test series against Argentina in Buenos Aires.

In 2019 she was a member of the national squad for the inaugural tournament of the FIH Pro League. Later that year in August she represented the team at the EuroHockey Nations Championship in Antwerp. In December, Picard was named in the Belgium squad for the 2020 calendar year.
