= Sabine Plönissen =

Dutch field hockey player

Personal information
- Born: 16 January 1995 (age 31) Netherlands

Sport
- Sport: Field hockey
- Position: Defender
- Club: Amsterdam
National team
Years	Team	Caps	Goals
2015	Netherlands U–21	4	(0)
2021–	Netherlands	11	(1)
Medal record
Women's field hockey
Representing Netherlands
World Cup
Gold medal – first place	2022 Terrassa/Amstelveen
FIH Pro League
Silver medal – second place	Season Three	Team

Sabine Plönissen (born 16 January 1995) is a field hockey player from the Netherlands.

== Career ==
=== Domestic league ===
In the Dutch Hoofdklasse, Plönissen plays for Amsterdam.

=== National teams ===
==== Under–21 ====
Sabine Plönissen made her debut for the Netherlands U–21 team in 2015 at an invitational tournament in Breda.

==== Oranje ====
Following six years outside of high performance programs, Plönissen was named in the Oranje squad for the first time in 2021. She made her international debut in the opening match of season three of the FIH Pro League.

In 2022 Plönissen was named in the Dutch squad for her first major international tournament, the FIH World Cup in Amsterdam and Terrassa.

=== International goals ===
Goal	Date	Location	Opponent	Score	Result	Competition	Ref.
1	2 July 2022	Wagener Stadium, Amsterdam, Netherlands	Ireland	3–1	5–1	2022 FIH World Cup	
