= 2019 Women's EuroHockey Junior Championship =

Tournament details
- Host country: Spain
- City: Valencia
- Dates: 13–21 July
- Teams: 9 (from 1 confederation)
- Venue: Estadio Betero

Final positions
- Champions: Spain (1st title)
- Runner-up: Netherlands
- Third place: Germany

Tournament statistics
- Matches played: 23
- Goals scored: 87 (3.78 per match)
- Top scorer: (Netherlands) Yibbi Jansen (8 goals)

The 2019 Women's EuroHockey Junior Championship was the 19th edition of the Women's EuroHockey Junior Championship. It was held alongside the men's tournament in Valencia, Spain between 13 and 21 July 2019.

This tournament served as the European qualifier for the 2021 Junior World Cup, with the top six teams qualifying.

== Participating nations ==
Alongside the host nation, 8 teams competed in the tournament.

Dates	Event	Location	Quotas	Qualifiers
28 August – 3 September 2017	2017 EuroHockey Junior Championship	Valencia, Spain	7	Belgium; England; France; Germany; Ireland; Netherlands; Spain
16–22 July 2017	2017 EuroHockey Junior Championship II	Hradec Králové, Czech Republic	2	Belarus; Russia
Total			9	

== Results ==
=== Preliminary round ===
==== Pool A ====
Pos	Team	Pld	W	D	L	GF	GA	GD	Pts	Qualification or relegation
1	Netherlands	4	4	0	0	24	2	+22	12	Qualification for the semi-finals and the 2021 Junior World Cup
2	Spain (H)	4	3	0	1	12	7	+5	9	Qualification for the semi-finals and the 2021 Junior World Cup
3	Russia	4	2	0	2	6	15	−9	6	Fifth place game and the 2021 Junior World Cup
4	Ireland	4	1	0	3	2	10	−8	3	Relegation to the Junior Championship II
5	France	4	0	0	4	3	13	−10	0	Relegation to the Junior Championship II

Source: FIH
(H) Hosts

13 July 2019
17:45

Ireland	0–1	Russia
	Report	Yushkova 48'

Umpires:
Sophie Bockelmann (GER)
Magali Sergeant (BEL)

13 July 2019
20:00

Spain	3–1	France
Álvarez 35'; L. Barrios 49'; C. Amundson 51'	Report	Pyrtek 24'

Umpires:
Xenia Ulrich (AUT)
Iryna Yaromenka (BLR)

14 July 2019
17:45

Netherlands	6–0	France
Van der Marel 4', 6'; Jansen 30+', 32'; Albers 37', 55'	Report

Umpires:
Anastasia Bogolyubova (RUS)
Gema Calderón (ESP)

14 July 2019
19:00

Spain	4–2	Russia
Álvarez 14', 50'; Zaldúa 18'; L. Barrios 57'	Report	Bordolimova 6', 23'

Umpires:
Gillian Garrett (IRE)
Rebecca Woodcock (ENG)

15 July 2019
20:00

Ireland	1–5	Netherlands
O'Brien 47'	Report	Dicke 6'; Moes 33'; Jansen 41', 55'; Van der Marel 48'

Umpires:
Anastasia Bogulyubova (RUS)
Iryna Yaromenka (BLR)

16 July 2019
11:15

Russia	3–2	France
Sanina 2'; Golubeva 54'; Gubaidullina 56'	Report	Gaspari 41'; Van Bolhuis 57'

Umpires:
Sophie Bockelmann (GER)
Gillian Garrett (IRL)

17 July 2019
17:45

Netherlands	9–0	Russia
Moes 2'; Dicke 5', 16', 54'; Jansen 35'; Omrani 38'; Van der Elst 40'; De Baat 53'; Van der Marel 55'	Report

Umpires:
Xenia Ulrich (AUT)
Katie Howie (SCO)

17 July 2019
20:00

Ireland	0–4	Spain
	Report	L. Barrios 13', 43'; Zaldúa 19'; S. Barrios 51'

Umpires:
Lisette Baljon (NED)
Rebecca Woodcock (ENG)

18 July 2019
17:45

Spain	1–4	Netherlands
Zaldúa 47'	Report	Jansen 3', 54'; Omrani 21'; De Baat 44'

Umpires:
Sophie Bockelmann (GER)
Katie Howie (SCO)

18 July 2019
20:00

France	0–1	Ireland
	Report	McLoughlin 29'

Umpires:
Magali Sergeant (BEL)
Lisette Baljon (FRA)

==== Pool B ====
Pos	Team	Pld	W	D	L	GF	GA	GD	Pts	Qualification or relegation
1	Germany	3	2	1	0	8	3	+5	7	Qualification for the semi-finals and the 2021 Junior World Cup
2	Belgium	3	0	3	0	3	3	0	3	Qualification for the semi-finals and the 2021 Junior World Cup
3	England	3	0	2	1	4	6	−2	2	Fifth place game and the 2021 Junior World Cup
4	Belarus	3	0	2	1	4	7	−3	2	Relegation to the Junior Championship II

Source: FIH

15 July 2019
09:00

Germany	4–1	Belarus
Kurz 13'; Sippel 13', 56'; Boermans 58'	Report	Batsiukova 47'

Umpires:
Katie Howie (SCO)
Magali Sergeant (BEL)

15 July 2019
15:30

England	1–1	Belgium
Ross 14'	Report	Ikegwuonu 59'

Umpires:
Lisette Baljon (NED)
Xenia Ulrich (AUT)

16 July 2019
15:30

Belgium	1–1	Belarus
Breyne 28'	Report	Mihunova 60'

Umpires:
Rebecca Woodcock (ENG)
Gema Calderón (ESP)

16 July 2019
17:45

Germany	3–1	England
M. Kiefer 5'; Heyn 13'; Boermans 60'	Report	Bowen 56'

Umpires:
Lisette Baljon (NED)
Anastasia Bogolyubova (RUS)

18 July 2019
09:00

England	2–2	Belarus
Park 17'; McCabe 49'	Report	Mihunova 50'; Batsiukova 55'

Umpires:
Xenia Ulrich (AUT)
Gema Calderón (ESP)

18 July 2019
11:15

Belgium	1–1	Germany
Englebert 3'	Report	Boermans 10'

Umpires:
Anastasia Bogolyubova (RUS)
Rebecca Woodcock (ENG)

=== Fifth to ninth place classification ===
Cross-over
20 July
Belarus	0
France	1

Seventh place
21 July
Ireland	5
France	1

==== Cross-over ====
20 July 2019
09:00

Belarus	0–1	France
	Report	Lhopital 48'

Umpires:
Xenia Ulrich (AUT)
Gillian Garrett (IRE)

==== Seventh and eighth place ====
21 July 2019
09:00

Ireland	5–1	France
M. Carey 39', 60'; Foley 41', 50'; Barry 44'	Report	Lhopital 52'

Umpires:
Sophie Bockelmann (GER)
Gema Calderón (ESP)

==== Fifth and sixth place ====
21 July 2019
09:00

Russia	2–2	England
Eroshina 33'; Yushkova 54'	Report	Walker 8'; Park 48'
Penalties
Golubeva (penalty shoot-out missed); Eroshina (penalty shoot-out scored); Eliseeva (penalty shoot-out scored); Sartakova (penalty shoot-out missed); Bordolimova (penalty shoot-out scored)	3–2	(penalty shoot-out scored) Walker; (penalty shoot-out missed) Birch; (penalty shoot-out missed) Bowen; (penalty shoot-out missed) Dowthwaite; (penalty shoot-out scored) Hamilton

Umpires:
Gillian Garrett (IRE)
Magali Sergeant (BEL)

=== First to fourth place classification ===
Semi-finals
20 July
Netherlands	3
Belgium	1
20 July
Germany	1 (1)
Spain (p.s.o)	1 (3)

Final
21 July
Netherlands	1 (3)
Spain (p.s.o)	1 (4)
Third place
21 July
Belgium	1 (2)
Germany (p.s.o)	1 (3)

==== Semi-finals ====
20 July 2019
11:15

Netherlands	3–1	Belgium
Jansen 24'; Albers 47'; Omrani 56'	Report	Breyne 60'

Umpires:
Rebecca Woodcock (ENG)
Gema Calderón (ESP)

20 July 2019
13:30

Germany	1–1	Spain
Pluta 47'	Report	Zaldúa 10'
Penalties
Gerstenhöfer (penalty shoot-out scored); Martin (penalty shoot-out missed); Bolle (penalty shoot-out missed); Heyn (penalty shoot-out missed)	1–3	(penalty shoot-out scored) Strappato; (penalty shoot-out scored) F. Amundson; (penalty shoot-out scored) Álvarez; (penalty shoot-out missed) C. Amundson

Umpires:
Lisette Baljon (FRA)
Magali Sergeant (BEL)

==== Third and fourth place ====
21 July 2019
11:15

Belgium	1–1	Germany
Rasir 58'	Report	Pluta 44'
Penalties
Englebert (penalty shoot-out missed); Willems (penalty shoot-out scored); Vanden Borre (penalty shoot-out scored); Ikegwuonu (penalty shoot-out missed); Vandersteen (penalty shoot-out missed) —— Willems (penalty shoot-out missed); Ikegwuonu (penalty shoot-out missed)	2–3	(penalty shoot-out missed) Gerstenhöfer; (penalty shoot-out missed) Heinz; (penalty shoot-out missed) Nolte; (penalty shoot-out scored) Kurz; (penalty shoot-out scored) Kirschbaum —— (penalty shoot-out missed) Kurz; (penalty shoot-out scored) Kirschbaum

Umpires:
Lisette Baljon (FRA)
Rebecca Woodcock (ENG)

===== Final =====
21 July 2019
17:15

Netherlands	1–1	Spain
Van der Veerdonk 25'	Report	Forte 60'
Penalties
Dicke (penalty shoot-out scored); Albers (penalty shoot-out scored); Jansen (penalty shoot-out scored); Moes (penalty shoot-out missed); Kappelle (penalty shoot-out missed)	3–4	(penalty shoot-out scored) Strappato; (penalty shoot-out scored) F. Amundson; (penalty shoot-out missed) Álvarez; (penalty shoot-out scored) C. Amundson; (penalty shoot-out scored) L. Barrios

Umpires:
Anastasia Bogolyubova (RUS)
Xenia Ulrich (AUT)

== Statistics ==
=== Final standings ===
Rank	Team
Gold medal	Spain
Silver medal	Netherlands
Bronze medal	Germany
4	Belgium
5	Russia
6	England
7	Ireland
8	France
9	Belarus

Qualified for the 2021 Junior World Cup

Relegated to the EuroHockey Junior Championship II

=== Goalscorers ===
There have been 87 goals scored in 23 matches, for an average of 3.78 goals per match.

8 goals

- (Netherlands) Yibbi Jansen

4 goals

- (Netherlands) Pien Dicke
- (Netherlands) Nina van der Marel
- (Spain) Laura Barrios
- (Spain) Isabel Zaldúa

3 goals

- (Germany) Emma Boermans
- (Netherlands) Felice Albers
- (Netherlands) Noor Omrani
- (Spain) Patricia Álvarez

2 goals

- (Belarus) Dziyana Batsiukova
- (Belarus) Karyna Mihunova
- (Belgium) Lucie Breyne
- (England) Jen Park
- (France) Yohanna Lhopital
- (Germany) Nicola Pluta
- (Germany) Carlotta Sippel
- (Ireland) Michelle Carey
- (Ireland) Laura Foley
- (Netherlands) Noor de Baat
- (Netherlands) Freeke Moes
- (Russia) Mariia Bordolimova
- (Russia) Dayana Yushkova

1 goal

- (Belgium) Charlotte Englebert
- (Belgium) Shaunda Ikegwuonu
- (Belgium) Justine Rasir
- (England) Nicole Bowen
- (England) Vicki McCabe
- (England) Lotti Ross
- (England) Lily Walker
- (France) Guusje van Bolhuis
- (France) Delfina Gaspari
- (France) Sarah Pyrtek
- (Germany) Naomi Heyn
- (Germany) Maren Kiefer
- (Germany) Stine Kurz
- (Ireland) Michelle Barry
- (Ireland) Hannah McLoughlin
- (Ireland) Siofra O'Brien
- (Netherlands) Fay van der Elst
- (Netherlands) Danique van der Veerdonk
- (Russia) Svetlana Eroshina
- (Russia) Anna Golubeva
- (Russia) Elza Gubaidullina
- (Russia) Kseniia Sanina
- (Spain) Constanza Amundson
- (Spain) Sara Barrios
- (Spain) Estel Forte

Source: FIH

== See also ==
- 2019 Men's EuroHockey Junior Championship
- 2019 Women's EuroHockey Nations Championship
