= Pien Dicke =

Dutch field hockey player (born 1999)

Personal information
- Born: 28 August 1999 (age 27) The Hague, Netherlands
- Height: 163 cm (5 ft 4 in)

Sport
- Sport: Field hockey
- Position: Forward
- Club: SCHC
National team
Years	Team	Caps	Goals
2016	Netherlands U–18	5	(4)
2019	Netherlands U–21	6	(4)
–	Netherlands	4	(1)
Medal record
Women's field hockey
Representing Netherlands
Olympic Games
Gold medal – first place	2024 Paris	Team
World Cup
Silver medal – second place	2026 Wavre/Amstelveen
European Championship
Gold medal – first place	2021 Amstelveen
Gold medal – first place	2023 Mönchengladbach
Gold medal – first place	2025 Mönchengladbach
EuroHockey Junior Championship
Silver medal – second place	2019 Valencia

Pien Dicke (born 28 August 1999) is a Dutch field hockey player, who plays as a forward.

== Personal life ==
Pien Dicke was born and raised in The Hague, Netherlands.

During her freshman year of university, Dicke studied at the University of Virginia.

== Career ==
=== Club hockey ===
In the Dutch Hoofdklasse, Dicke plays club hockey for SCHC.

=== National teams ===
==== Under–18 ====
Pien Dicke made her debut in Netherlands colours in 2016, as part of the Under–18 team at the EuroHockey Youth Championship in Cork, Ireland.

==== Under–21 ====
In 2019, Dicke made her second appearance for a Dutch team with the Under–21 team at the EuroHockey Junior Championship in Valencia, Spain. Dicke scored four goals throughout the tournament, helping the team to a silver medal after losing the final in a penalty shoot-out against Spain.

==== Oranje Dames ====
In 2019, Dicke was named in the Netherlands senior squad for the first time, and made her debut in 2020.
