= Carlotta Sippel =

German field hockey player

Personal information
- Full name: Mia Carlotta Sippel
- Born: 26 July 2001 (age 25) Germany

Sport
- Sport: Field hockey
- Position: Forward
- Club: Club an der Alster
National team
Years	Team	Caps	Goals
2019–	Germany U–21	9	(3)
2019–	Germany	5	(1)
Medal record
Women's field hockey
Representing Germany
EuroHockey Junior Championship
Bronze medal – third place	2019 Valencia

Mia Carlotta Sippel (born 26 July 2001) is a German field hockey player.

== Career ==
=== Club level ===
In club competition, Sippel plays for Club an der Alster in the German Bundesliga.

=== Junior national team ===
Carlotta Sippel made her debut for the German U–21 team in 2019. Her first appearance was during a test series against Belgium in Cologne. Later that year, she went on to win a bronze medal with the team at the EuroHockey Junior Championship in Valencia.

In 2022, Sippel was named in the junior squad for the postponed FIH Junior World Cup in Potchefstroom.

=== Die Honamas ===
Sippel made her debut for Die Danas in 2019, during a test series against Argentina in Buenos Aires.

She has since gone on to represent Germany in the FIH Pro League.
