= 2017 Women's EuroHockey Junior Championship =

Tournament details
- Host country: Spain
- City: Valencia
- Dates: 28 August – 3 September
- Teams: 7 (from 1 confederation)
- Venue: Estadio Betero

Final positions
- Champions: Netherlands (10th title)
- Runner-up: Belgium
- Third place: England

Tournament statistics
- Matches played: 14
- Goals scored: 50 (3.57 per match)
- Top scorer(s): (England) Erica Sanders (Netherlands) Yibbi Jansen (Netherlands) Marijn Veen (4 goals)
- Best player: (Netherlands) Marijn Veen

The 2017 Women's EuroHockey Junior Championships was the 18th edition of the Women's EuroHockey Junior Championship, an under 21 women's field hockey tournament. It was held in Valencia, Spain between 28 August and 3 September 2017.

Netherlands won the tournament by defeating Belgium 6–0 in the final. England won the bronze medal by defeating Germany 3–2 in the third-place playoff.

== Qualified teams ==
Italy withdrew before the tournament.

Dates	Event	Location	Quotas	Qualifier(s)
20–26 July 2014	2014 EuroHockey Junior Championship	Waterloo, Belgium	6	Belgium; England; France; Germany; Netherlands; Spain
14–20 July 2014	2014 EuroHockey Junior Championship II	Vienna, Austria	1	Ireland; ~~Italy~~
Total			7	

== Results ==
=== Preliminary round ===
==== Pool A ====
Pos	Team	Pld	W	D	L	GF	GA	GD	Pts	Qualification
1	Netherlands	2	2	0	0	6	3	+3	6	Semi-finals
2	Belgium	2	0	1	1	3	4	−1	1	Semi-finals
3	Spain (H)	2	0	1	1	4	6	−2	1	

Source: FIH
Rules for classification: 1) points; 2) goal difference; 3) goals scored; 4) head-to-head result.
(H) Hosts

28 August 2017
17:45

Netherlands	2–1	Belgium
Van Laarhoven 17'; Veen 39'	Report	Ronquetti 60'

Umpires:
Dovile Bernotiene (LTU)
Sophie Bockelmann (GER)

29 August 2017
20:00

Spain	2–4	Netherlands
Iglesias 10'; L. Barrios 56'	Report	Veen 15'; Jansen 26', 42'; Zerbo 36'

Umpires:
Ines El Hajem (FRA)
Christine Reid (IRE)

31 August 2017
17:45

Belgium	2–2	Spain
Boey 52'; Puvrez 60'	Report	S. Barrios 55'; Ycart 56'

Umpires:
Ines El Hajem (FRA)
Rebecca Woodcock (ENG)

==== Pool B ====
Pos	Team	Pld	W	D	L	GF	GA	GD	Pts	Qualification
1	England	3	3	0	0	7	2	+5	9	Semi-finals
2	Germany	3	1	1	1	3	2	+1	4	Semi-finals
3	France	3	1	1	1	3	3	0	4	
4	Ireland	3	0	0	3	1	7	−6	0	

Source: FIH
Rules for classification: 1) points; 2) goal difference; 3) goals scored; 4) head-to-head result.

28 August 2017
11:15

England	3–0	Ireland
Munro 3'; Sanders 15'; Hunt 29'	Report

Umpires:
Ana Faias (POR)
Sandra Adell (ESP)

28 August 2017
11:15

Germany	0–0	France
	Report

Umpires:
Christine Reid (IRE)
Magali Sergeant (BEL)

29 August 2017
15:30

Ireland	0–1	France
	Report	Lhopital 59'

Umpires:
Rebecca Woodcock (ENG)
Sophie Bockelmann (GER)

29 August 2017
17:45

Germany	0–1	England
	Report	Daly 9'

Umpires:
Ymkje van Slooten (NED)
Magali Sergeant (BEL)

31 August 2017
09:00

Ireland	1–3	Germany
Russell 18'	Report	Gerstenhöfer 8'; Micheel 22'; Aring 59'

Umpires:
Sandra Adell (ESP)
Ymkje van Slooten (NED)

31 August 2017
09:00

England	3–2	France
Munro 17'; Childs 35'; Sanders 59'	Report	Gaspari 17'; Vankemmel 40'

Umpires:
Ana Faias (POR)
Dovile Bernotiene (NED)

=== Classification round ===
==== Pool C ====
- The match between Ireland and Spain was cancelled due to illness; as a result no teams were relegated.

Pos	Team	Pld	W	D	L	GF	GA	GD	Pts
1	Spain	1	1	0	0	3	1	+2	3
2	France	2	1	0	1	2	3	−1	3
3	Ireland	1	0	0	1	0	1	−1	0

Source: FIH
Rules for classification: 1) points; 2) goal difference; 3) goals scored; 4) head-to-head result.

2 September 2017
15:00

Spain	3–1	France
Amundson 20'; Ycart 26'; Bruguera 33'	Report	Vankemmel 25'

Umpires:
Dovile Bernotiene (NED)
Christine Reid (IRE)

3 September 2017
13:00

Spain	Cancelled	Ireland
	Report

==== First to fourth place classification ====
Semi-finals
2 September
England	1
Belgium	3
2 September
Netherlands	3
Germany	1

Final
3 September
Belgium	0
Netherlands	6
Third place
3 September
England	3
Germany	2

===== Semi-finals =====
2 September 2017
17:30

England	1–3	Belgium
Sanders 37'	Report	Gose 3'; Ikegwuonu 10'; Simons 49'

Umpires:
Sophie Bockelmann (GER)
Ymkje van Slooten (NED)

2 September 2017
20:00

Netherlands	3–1	Germany
Veen 37', 51'; Jansen 53'	Report	Schubert 22'

Umpires:
Ana Faias (POR)
Rebecca Woodcock (ENG)

==== Third and fourth place ====
3 September 2017
15:00

England	3–2	Germany
Sanders 12'; Munro 56'; Burge 58'	Report	Aring 44'; Gräve 55'

Umpires:
Ymkje van Slooten (NED)
Sandra Adell (ESP)

==== Final ====
3 September 2017
20:00

Belgium	0–6	Netherlands
	Report	Zerbo 5'; Moes 15', 25'; Renders 35' van der Hoek 53'; Jansen 59'

Umpires:
Sophie Bockelmann (GER)
Rebecca Woodcock (ENG)

== Statistics ==
=== Awards ===
Player of the Tournament	Top Goalscorers	Goalkeeper of the Tournament
(Netherlands) Marijn Veen	(England) Erica Sanders (Netherlands) Yibbi Jansen (Netherlands) Marijn Veen	(Belgium) Elodie Picard

=== Final standings ===
As per statistical convention in field hockey, matches decided in extra time are counted as wins and losses, while matches decided by penalty shoot-outs are counted as draws.

Pos	Team	Pld	W	D	L	GF	GA	GD	Pts	Status
1st place, gold medalist(s)	Netherlands	4	4	0	0	15	4	+11	12	Gold Medal
2nd place, silver medalist(s)	Belgium	4	1	1	2	6	11	−5	4	Silver Medal
3rd place, bronze medalist(s)	England	5	4	0	1	11	7	+4	12	Bronze Medal
4	Germany	5	1	1	3	6	8	−2	4	Fourth place
5	Spain	3	1	1	1	7	7	0	4	Eliminated in group stage
6	France	4	1	1	2	4	6	−2	4	Eliminated in group stage
7	Ireland	3	0	0	3	1	7	−6	0	Eliminated in group stage

Source: FIH

=== Goalscorers ===
There were 50 goals scored in 14 matches, for an average of 3.57 goals per match.

4 goals

- (England) Erica Sanders
- (Netherlands) Yibbi Jansen
- (Netherlands) Marijn Veen

3 goals

- (England) Holly Munro

2 goals

- (France) Victorine Vankemmel
- (Germany) Nele Aring
- (Netherlands) Freeke Moes
- (Netherlands) Ginella Zerbo
- (Spain) Clara Ycart

1 goal

- (Belgium) Leylou Boey
- (Belgium) Daphné Gose
- (Belgium) Shaunda Ikegwuonu
- (Belgium) Emma Puvrez
- (Belgium) Marie Ronquetti
- (Belgium) Manon Simons
- (England) Esme Burge
- (England) Charlotte Daly
- (England) Charlotte Childs
- (England) Holly Hunt
- (France) Delfina Gaspari
- (France) Yohanna Lhopital
- (Germany) Charlotte Gerstenhöfer
- (Germany) Elisa Gräve
- (Germany) Lena Micheel
- (Germany) Tessa-Margot Schubert
- (Ireland) Abbi Russell
- (Netherlands) Maud Renders
- (Netherlands) Imme van der Hoek
- (Netherlands) Renée van Laarhoven
- (Spain) Florencia Amundson
- (Spain) Lara Bruguera
- (Spain) Laura Barrios
- (Spain) Sara Barrios
- (Spain) Belén Iglesias

Source: FIH

== See also ==
- 2017 Men's EuroHockey Junior Championship
- 2017 Women's EuroHockey Nations Championship
