= Freeke Moes =

Dutch field hockey player

Personal information
- Born: 29 November 1998 (age 27) Breda, Netherlands

Sport
- Sport: Field hockey
- Position: Forward
Senior career
Years	Team	Caps	Goals
2025–present	Odisha Warriors	-	-
National team
Years	Team	Caps	Goals
2017–2019	Netherlands U–21	10	(4)
2019–	Netherlands	5	(1)
Medal record
Women's field hockey
Representing Netherlands
Olympic Games
Gold medal – first place	2024 Paris	Team
World Cup
Gold medal – first place	2022 Terrassa/Amstelveen
Silver medal – second place	2026 Wavre/Amstelveen
EuroHockey Championship
Gold medal – first place	2023 Mönchengladbach
Gold medal – first place	2025 Mönchengladbach
EuroHockey Junior Championship
Gold medal – first place	2017 Valencia
Silver medal – second place	2019 Valencia

Freeke Moes (born 29 November 1998) is a Dutch field hockey player, who plays for the Netherlands national team.

== Career ==
=== Club hockey ===
Freeke Moes plays club hockey for Amsterdamsche Hockey & Bandy Club in the Dutch Hoofdklasse.

=== Junior national teams ===
==== Under–18 ====
In 2016, Moes made her first appearance for a Dutch junior team at the EuroHockey Youth Championships in Cork, Ireland. The Dutch Under–18 team won the tournament, with Moes scoring twice during the campaign.

==== Under–21 ====
Moes made her debut for the national Under–21 team in 2017 at the EuroHockey Junior Championships in Valencia, Spain. The Dutch team won gold at the tournament after defeating Belgium 6–0.

In 2019, Moes represented the Dutch side again at another EuroHockey Junior Championship, this time as captain. The Netherlands lost the final 3–4 in penalties to the hosts, Spain.

=== Senior national team ===
In December 2018, Netherlands head coach Alyson Annan named Moes in the 32 player national squad for the 2019 FIH Pro League. Moes went on to make her senior international debut during the tournament in a match against the United States on 16 February.

She was included in the Netherlands squad for the women's field hockey tournament at the 2020 Summer Olympics, held in July and August 2021. Though designated as an alternate player, due to rule changes caused by the COVID-19 pandemic she was eligible to compete in all matches (unlike previous tournaments, in which alternates could only compete after permanently replacing an injured player). Though the Netherlands earned the gold medal, she did not make an appearance and was therefore ineligible to receive a medal.

==== International goals ====
Goal	Date	Location	Opponent	Score	Result	Competition	Ref.
1	3 March 2019	Wujin Hockey Stadium, Changzhou, China	China	2–1	2–1	2019 FIH Pro League	
2	13 October 2021	Wagener Stadium, Amstelveen, Netherlands	Belgium	2–0	2–0	2021–22 FIH Pro League	
