= Emma Boermans =

German field hockey player (born 1999)

Personal information
- Full name: Emma Karlotta Boermans
- Born: 25 April 1999 (age 27) Germany

Sport
- Sport: Field hockey
- Position: Forward
- Club: Mannheimer HC
National team
| Years | Team | Caps | Goals |
| 2017–2019 | Germany U–21 | 19 | (8) |
| 2019– | Germany | 4 | (0) |
Medal record
Women's field hockey
Representing Germany
EuroHockey Junior Championship
| Bronze medal – third place | 2019 Valencia |

Emma Karlotta Boermans (born 17 August 1999) is a German field hockey player, who plays as a forward.

== Career ==
=== Club hockey ===
In the German Bundesliga, Boermans represents Rot-Weiss Köln.

=== National teams ===
==== Under–21 ====
Emma Boermans made her debut for the German U–21 team in 2017 during a test series against Malaysia in Köln.

In 2019, she represented the team at the EuroHockey Junior Championship in Valencia, where she won a bronze medal.

==== Die Danas ====
Boermans debuted for Die Danas in 2019, during the first season of the FIH Pro League.

She has since gone on to represent the national team in the second and third seasons of the FIH Pro League in 2021.
