= Florencia Amundson =

Spanish field hockey player (born 1998)

Personal information
- Full name: Florencia Amundson Téves
- Born: 12 February 1998 (age 28) Madrid, Spain
- Height: 1.74

Sport
- Sport: Field hockey
- Position: Forward
- Club: Real Club de Polo
National team
Years	Team	Caps	Goals
2015–2016	Spain U–18	10	(7)
2016–2019	Spain U–21	19	(4)
2021–	Spain	11	(1)
Medal record
Women's field hockey
Representing Spain
EuroHockey Championship
Bronze medal – third place	2025 Mönchengladbach
EuroHockey Junior Championship
Gold medal – first place	2019 Valencia

Florencia Amundson Téves (born 12 February 1998) is a Spanish field hockey player.

== Personal life ==
Florencia Amundson has a twin sister, Constanza, who also plays field hockey for Spain. She studied advertising and public relations in Complutense University of Madrid. and Pompeu Fabra University in Barcelona, where she finished her studies.

During her studies, she signed at Dragon, a Belgium hockey club for three years, from 2017 to 2019.

== Career ==
=== Club level ===
In club competition, Amundson plays for Real Club de Polo in the Liga Iberdrola.

=== Junior national teams ===
Florencia Amundson has represented Spain in junior hockey at both Under–18 and Under–21 levels.

==== Under–18 ====
Amundson made her first appearance for the Spain U–18 team in 2015 at the EuroHockey Youth Championship in Santander.

The following year she represented the team at another EuroHockey Youth Championship, held in Cork.

==== Under–21 ====
She made her debut for the Spanish U–21 team in 2016. She first represented the side in a 5–Nations Tournament in Valencia. Later that year, she went on to compete at the FIH Junior World Cup in Santiago.

She represented the team again in 2017 at the EuroHockey Junior Championship in Valencia.

In 2019 she made her final appearance with the junior national team. She captained the side to an historic gold medal at the EuroHockey Junior Championships in Valencia.

=== Las Redsticks ===
Florencia Amundson made her senior international debut for Las Redsticks in 2021, during season three of the FIH Pro League.
