= Charlotte Gerstenhöfer =

German field hockey player (born 1999)

Personal information
- Born: 17 August 1999 (age 27) Germany

Sport
- Sport: Field hockey
- Position: Forward
- Club: Mannheimer HC
National team
Years	Team	Caps	Goals
2017–2019	Germany U–21	29	(3)
2019–	Germany	4	(0)
2020–	Germany Indoor	5	(2)
Medal record
Women's field hockey
Representing Germany
EuroHockey Junior Championship
Bronze medal – third place	2019 Valencia

Charlotte Gerstenhöfer (born 17 August 1999) is a German field hockey player, who plays as a forward.

== Career ==
=== Club hockey ===
In the German Bundesliga, Gerstenhöfer represents Mannheimer HC.

=== National teams ===
==== Under–21 ====
Charlotte Gerstenhöfer made her debut for the German U–21 team in 2017 during a test series against Malaysia in Köln. Later that year, she represented the team at the EuroHockey Junior Championship in Valencia.

In 2019, she captained the team to a bronze medal at the EuroHockey Junior Championship in Valencia.

==== Die Danas ====
Gerstenhöfer debuted for Die Danas in 2019, during a test series against Argentina in Buenos Aires.

In 2021 she was elevated to the national team, participating in the third season of the FIH Pro League.

==== Indoor ====
In 2020, Gerstenhöfer was a member of the German team at the EuroHockey Indoor Championship in Minsk.
