= Pien Sanders =

Dutch field hockey player

Personal information
- Born: 11 June 1998 (age 28) Udenhout, Netherlands

Sport
- Sport: Field hockey
- Position: Defender
- Club: Den Bosch
National team
Years	Team	Caps	Goals
2016-2016	Netherlands U–21	6	(3)
2017–present	Netherlands	63	(1)
Medal record
Women's field hockey
Representing Netherlands
Olympic Games
Gold medal – first place	2020 Tokyo	Team
Gold medal – first place	2024 Paris	Team
World Cup
Gold medal – first place	2022 Terrassa/Amstelveen
Silver medal – second place	2026 Wavre/Amstelveen
FIH World League
Gold medal – first place	2016–17 Auckland	Team
EuroHockey Nations Championship
Gold medal – first place	2017 Amstelveen
Gold medal – first place	2021 Amstelveen
Gold medal – first place	2023 Mönchengladbach
Gold medal – first place	2025 Mönchengladbach
Champions Trophy
Gold medal – first place	2018 Changzhou
FIH Junior World Cup
Silver medal – second place	2016 Santiago

Pien Sanders (born 11 June 1998) is a Dutch field hockey player who plays as a defender for Den Bosch and the Dutch national team.

== Personal life ==
Pien Sanders grew up in Tilburg, Netherlands. Sanders is currently in a romantic relationship with Dutch football player Jill Roord.

Sanders is sponsored by Brabo Hockey.

== Career ==
=== Club hockey ===
In the Dutch Hoofdklasse, Sanders plays for HC Den Bosch.

=== National teams ===
==== Under–18 ====
In 2015, Sanders was a member of the Netherlands U–18 side at the EuroHockey Youth Championship in Santander, Spain. At the tournament, Sanders won a gold medal with the team and was awarded Player of the Tournament.

==== Under–21 ====
Sanders was a member of the Netherlands Under–21 team at the 2016 FIH Junior World Cup in Santiago, Chile where the team won a silver medal.

==== Oranje Dames ====
Pien Sanders made her debut for the Oranje Dames in 2017, during a test series against Spain in Cádiz, Spain.

Since her debut, Sanders has medalled with the Dutch national team on three occasions, winning gold on each occasion. The medals came at the 2017 EuroHockey Championships in Amstelveen, Netherlands; at the 2016–17 FIH World League in Auckland, New Zealand; and at the 2018 Champions Trophy in Changzhou, China.

In 2019, Sanders appeared in the inaugural tournament of the FIH Pro League.

=== International goals ===
Goal	Date	Location	Opponent	Score	Result	Competition	Ref.
1	24 February 2019	CeNARD, Buenos Aires, Argentina	Argentina	2–1	2–1	2019 FIH Pro League	
