= Sophie Limauge =

Belgian field hockey player

Personal information
- Born: 2 July 1998 (age 28)

Sport
- Sport: Field hockey
- Position: Midfielder/Forward
- Club: Waterloo Ducks H.C.
National team
Years	Team	Caps	Goals
–	Belgium	41	-

Sophie Limauge (born 2 July 1998) is a Belgian field hockey player for the Belgian national team.

She participated at the 2018 Women's Hockey World Cup.
