= Naomi Heyn =

German field hockey player

Personal information
- Born: 20 September 1998 (age 27) Germany

Sport
- Sport: Field hockey
- Position: Forward
- Club: Mannheimer HC
National team
Years	Team	Caps	Goals
2015–2016	Germany U–18	10	(2)
2016–2019	Germany U–21	11	(2)
2017–	Germany	20	(3)
Medal record
Women's field hockey
Representing Germany
EuroHockey Junior Championship
Bronze medal – third place	2019 Valenica	Team

Naomi Heyn (born 20 September 1998) is a field hockey player from Germany, who plays as a forward.

== Early life ==
Naomi Heyn started playing Hockey at the age of 7. In her youth she played for RTHC only. She eventually changed to Rot-Weiss Köln, as she was keen on improving her skills in a team that was in the Bundesliga. This Change greatly helped her improve her skills. Because she was performing well in the Bundesliga, she drew a lot of attention towards her, and her talent was ultimately noticed by coaches of the national team.

== Career ==
=== Club hockey ===
In the German Bundesliga, Heyn plays club hockey for Mannheimer HC.

=== National teams ===
==== Under–18 ====
Naomi Heyn made her first appearance in German colours in 2015 at the EuroHockey Youth Championship in Santander, Spain. She went on to represent the team at the Youth Championship the following year in Cork, Ireland, winning silver medals at both events.

==== Under–21 ====
Heyn represented the Germany U–21 side on numerous occasions throughout her junior career. Her most notable performance with the team was at the 2019 EuroHockey Junior Championship in Valencia, Spain, where the team won a bronze medal.

==== Damen ====
In 2017, Heyn made her debut for the German national team during a test series against Ireland in Düsseldorf, Germany.

Heyn also appeared for the national team during the inaugural tournament of the FIH Pro League.

In December 2019, Heyn was named in the preliminary German Olympic squad to train for the 2020 Summer Olympics in Tokyo, Japan.
