= Stine Kurz =

German field hockey player

Personal information
- Born: 20 May 2000 (age 26) Stuttgart, Germany

Sport
- Sport: Field hockey
- Position: Defence
- Club: Mannheimer HC
National team
Years	Team	Caps	Goals
2019–	Germany U–21	11	(5)
2020–	Germany Indoor	5	(2)
2021–	Germany	1	(1)
Medal record
Women's field hockey
Representing Germany
EuroHockey Championship
Bronze medal – third place	2023 Mönchengladbach
EuroHockey Junior Championship
Bronze medal – third place	2019 Valencia

Stine Kurz (born 20 May 2000) is a German field hockey player, who plays as a defender.

== Career ==
=== Club hockey ===
In the German Bundesliga, Kurz represents Mannheimer HC.

=== National teams ===
==== Under–21 ====
Stine Kurz made her debut for the German U–21 team in 2019 during a 3 Nations Tournament, held in Viersen and Mönchengladbach. Later that year, she represented the team at the EuroHockey Junior Championship in Valencia, where she won a bronze medal.

==== Indoor ====
In 2020, Kurz was a member of the German team at the EuroHockey Indoor Championship in Minsk.

==== Die Danas ====
Kurz debuted for Die Danas in 2021, during the third season of the FIH Pro League. In her debut game against Belgium, Kurz also scored her first international goal.

=== International goals ===
Goal	Date	Location	Opponent	Score	Result	Competition	Ref.
1	17 October 2021	Royal Uccle Sport, Uccle, Belgium	Belgium	1–2	1–3	2021–22 FIH Pro League	
