= Aisling D'Hooghe =

Belgian field hockey player (born 1994)

Personal information
- Born: 25 August 1994 (age 31) Uccle, Belgium
- Height: 1.69 m (5 ft 7 in)
- Weight: 63 kg (139 lb)

Sport
- Sport: Field hockey
- Position: Goalkeeper
- Club: Waterloo Ducks H.C.
National team
Years	Team	Caps	Goals
–	Belgium	161	(0)
Medal record
Women's field hockey
Representing Belgium
European Championships
Silver medal – second place	2017 Amstelveen
Silver medal – second place	2023 Mönchengladbach

Aisling D'Hooghe (born 25 August 1994) is a Belgian field hockey player. At the 2012 Summer Olympics she competed with the Belgium women's national field hockey team in the women's tournament.

In September 2017, she won the silver medal at the EuroHockey Nations Championship which took place in Amstelveen, the Netherlands. She was also elected as best Goalie of the Tournament by the European Hockey Federation at the end of the tournament. This medal is considered as a major event for the Belgian Women's hockey since it is the first time ever that the team won a medal in a major competition.
