= Yibbi Jansen =

Dutch field hockey player (born 1999)

Personal information
- Born: 18 November 1999 (age 26) Gemonde, Netherlands

Sport
- Sport: Field hockey
- Position: Midfield
Senior career
| Years | Team | Caps | Goals |
| –present | Stichtsche | - | - |
| 2025– | Odisha Warriors | - | - |
National team
| Years | Team | Caps | Goals |
| 2017–2019 | Netherlands U–21 | 10 | (12) |
| 2018– | Netherlands | 90 | (87) |
Medal record
Women's field hockey
Representing Netherlands
Olympic Games
| Gold medal – first place | 2024 Paris | Team |
FIH World Cup
| Gold medal – first place | 2022 Terrassa–Amstelveen |
| Silver medal – second place | 2026 Wavre/Amstelveen |
European Championship
| Gold medal – first place | 2023 Mönchengladbach |
| Gold medal – first place | 2025 Mönchengladbach |
FIH Pro League
| Gold medal – first place | Season Four |
| Gold medal – first place | Season Five |
| Gold medal – first place | Season Six |
| Gold medal – first place | Season Seven |
| Silver medal – second place | Season Three |
FIH Champions Trophy
| Gold medal – first place | 2018 Changzhou |
EuroHockey U21 Championship
| Gold medal – first place | 2017 Valencia |
| Silver medal – second place | 2019 Valencia |

Yibbi Jansen (born 18 November 1999) is a Dutch professional field hockey player.

== Personal life ==
Yibbi Jansen was born and raised in Gemonde, a village in the North Brabant province of the Netherlands.

Her father, Ronald Jansen, is a former goalkeeper for the Dutch men's team.

== Career ==
=== Hoofdklasse ===
In the Dutch Hoofdklasse, Jansen plays for SCHC.

In the past, she has also represented other clubs. She began her senior domestic career playing for Den Bosch, before moving to Oranje-Rood in 2016.

=== Under–21 ===
Jansen made her international debut at under–21 level. During her junior career with the Netherlands U–21 side, she medalled at two editions of the EuroHockey U21 Championship. She took home gold at the 2017 edition and silver at the 2019 edition, both held in Valencia.

=== Oranje ===
At the age of just eighteen, Jansen made her senior international debut for the Netherlands. She earned her first cap in January 2018, during a test match against the United States in Stanford.

Since her debut, Jansen has been a regular inclusion in the Dutch squad, appearing in many major tournaments. She won gold at the 2022 FIH World Cup held in Terrassa and Amstelveen, as well as the 2023 EuroHockey Championship in Mönchengladbach. She has also represented the Netherlands in every season of the FIH Pro League to date, holding the title of All-Time Highest Goalscorer, as well as winning gold medals on two occasions, and silver once.

In 2024, Jansen was named in the Dutch squad for the XXXIII Summer Olympics in Paris. The team won the gold medal, successfully defending their title from 2020. Jansen finished the tournament as the highest goalscorer. Later that year, she was honoured at the FIH Hockey Stars Awards, being named the Player of the Year for 2024.

== International goals ==
The following is a list of international goals scorer by Jansen.

| Goal | Date | Location | Opponent | Score | Result | Competition | Ref. |
|---|---|---|---|---|---|---|---|
| 1 | 27 January 2018 | Stanford University, Stanford, United States | United States | 1–0 | 7–2 | Test Match | |
| 2 | 28 January 2018 | Stanford University, Stanford, United States | United States | 7–1 | 7–1 | Test Match | |
| 3 | 18 November 2018 | Wujin Hockey Stadium, Changzhou, China | Argentina | 2–0 | 3–0 | 2018 FIH Champions Trophy | |
| 4 | 14 April 2019 | HC Rotterdam, Rotterdam, Netherlands | United States | 5–1 | 7–1 | 2019 FIH Pro League | |
| 5 | 8 June 2019 | Wilrijkse Plein, Antwerp, Belgium | Belgium | 1–0 | 2–1 | 2019 FIH Pro League | |
| 6 | 16 February 2020 | CeNARD, Buenos Aires, Argentina | Argentina | 2–1 | 3–1 | 2020–21 FIH Pro League | |
| 7 | 5 February 2022 | Estadio Beteró, Valencia, Spain | Spain | 1–0 | 2–2 (3–2) | 2021–22 FIH Pro League | |
| 8 | 5 February 2022 | Estadio Beteró, Valencia, Spain | Spain | 2–1 | 2–2 (3–2) | 2021–22 FIH Pro League | |
| 9 | 5 February 2022 | Wagener Stadium, Amsterdam, Netherlands | United States | 1–0 | 10–0 | 2021–22 FIH Pro League | |
| 10 | 5 February 2022 | Wagener Stadium, Amsterdam, Netherlands | United States | 3–0 | 10–0 | 2021–22 FIH Pro League | |
| 11 | 5 February 2022 | Wagener Stadium, Amsterdam, Netherlands | United States | 10–0 | 10–0 | 2021–22 FIH Pro League | |
| 12 | 8 April 2022 | Kalinga Stadium, Bhubaneswar, India | India | 1–2 | 1–2 | 2021–22 FIH Pro League | |
| 13 | 9 April 2022 | Kalinga Stadium, Bhubaneswar, India | India | 1–1 | 1–1 (3–1) | 2021–22 FIH Pro League | |
| 14 | 29 May 2022 | HC Union, Nijmegen, Netherlands | Argentina | 1–0 | 1–1 (3–2) | 2021–22 FIH Pro League | |
| 15 | 12 June 2022 | Der Club an der Alster, Hamburg, Germany | Germany | 3–1 | 3–1 | 2021–22 FIH Pro League | |
| 16 | 2 July 2022 | Wagener Stadium, Amsterdam, Netherlands | Ireland | 2–0 | 5–1 | 2022 FIH World Cup | |
| 17 | 6 July 2022 | Wagener Stadium, Amsterdam, Netherlands | Chile | 2–1 | 3–1 | 2022 FIH World Cup | |
| 18 | 27 November 2022 | Stichtsche Cricket en Hockey Club, Bilthoven, Netherlands | Ireland | 1–0 | 5–0 | Test Match | |
| 19 | 27 November 2022 | Stichtsche Cricket en Hockey Club, Bilthoven, Netherlands | Ireland | 2–0 | 5–0 | Test Match | |
| 20 | 27 November 2022 | Stichtsche Cricket en Hockey Club, Bilthoven, Netherlands | Ireland | 4–0 | 5–0 | Test Match | |
| 21 | 13 December 2022 | Polideportivo Provincial, Santiago del Estero, Argentina | Great Britain | 2–1 | 2–1 | 2022–23 FIH Pro League | |
| 22 | 14 December 2022 | Polideportivo Provincial, Santiago del Estero, Argentina | Argentina | 3–0 | 3–1 | 2022–23 FIH Pro League | |
| 23 | 16 December 2022 | Polideportivo Provincial, Santiago del Estero, Argentina | Argentina | 2–0 | 2–0 | 2022–23 FIH Pro League | |
| 24 | 8 June 2023 | HC Oranje-Rood, Eindhoven, Netherlands | Australia | 1–1 | 7–2 | 2022–23 FIH Pro League | |
| 25 | 8 June 2023 | HC Oranje-Rood, Eindhoven, Netherlands | Australia | 3–1 | 7–2 | 2022–23 FIH Pro League | |
| 26 | 8 June 2023 | HC Oranje-Rood, Eindhoven, Netherlands | Australia | 7–2 | 7–2 | 2022–23 FIH Pro League | |
| 27 | 10 June 2023 | HC Oranje-Rood, Eindhoven, Netherlands | China | 2–1 | 4–2 | 2022–23 FIH Pro League | |
| 28 | 10 June 2023 | HC Oranje-Rood, Eindhoven, Netherlands | China | 4–2 | 4–2 | 2022–23 FIH Pro League | |
| 29 | 11 June 2023 | HC Oranje-Rood, Eindhoven, Netherlands | Australia | 2–1 | 3–3 (1–2) | 2022–23 FIH Pro League | |
| 30 | 23 June 2023 | Wagener Stadium, Amsterdam, Netherlands | Germany | 2–0 | 5–0 | 2022–23 FIH Pro League | |
| 31 | 23 June 2023 | Wagener Stadium, Amsterdam, Netherlands | Germany | 3–0 | 5–0 | 2022–23 FIH Pro League | |
| 32 | 27 June 2023 | Wagener Stadium, Amsterdam, Netherlands | New Zealand | 1–0 | 7–1 | 2022–23 FIH Pro League | |
| 33 | 4 July 2023 | Wilrijkse Plein, Antwerp, Belgium | Belgium | 1–1 | 2–1 | 2022–23 FIH Pro League | |
| 34 | 4 July 2023 | Wilrijkse Plein, Antwerp, Belgium | Belgium | 2–1 | 2–1 | 2022–23 FIH Pro League | |
| 35 | 19 August 2023 | SparkassenPark, Mönchengladbach, Germany | Spain | 1–0 | 5–1 | 2023 EuroHockey Championship | |
| 36 | 19 August 2023 | SparkassenPark, Mönchengladbach, Germany | Spain | 2–0 | 5–1 | 2023 EuroHockey Championship | |
| 37 | 19 August 2023 | SparkassenPark, Mönchengladbach, Germany | Spain | 5–1 | 5–1 | 2023 EuroHockey Championship | |
| 38 | 22 August 2023 | SparkassenPark, Mönchengladbach, Germany | Italy | 2–0 | 5–0 | 2023 EuroHockey Championship | |
| 39 | 24 August 2023 | SparkassenPark, Mönchengladbach, Germany | England | 1–0 | 7–0 | 2023 EuroHockey Championship | |
| 40 | 24 August 2023 | SparkassenPark, Mönchengladbach, Germany | England | 3–0 | 7–0 | 2023 EuroHockey Championship | |
| 41 | 24 August 2023 | SparkassenPark, Mönchengladbach, Germany | England | 6–0 | 7–0 | 2023 EuroHockey Championship | |
| 42 | 7 December 2023 | Polideportivo Provincial, Santiago del Estero, Argentina | Great Britain | 1–0 | 8–0 | 2023–24 FIH Pro League | |
| 43 | 7 December 2023 | Polideportivo Provincial, Santiago del Estero, Argentina | Great Britain | 2–0 | 8–0 | 2023–24 FIH Pro League | |
| 44 | 7 December 2023 | Polideportivo Provincial, Santiago del Estero, Argentina | Great Britain | 6–0 | 8–0 | 2023–24 FIH Pro League | |
| 45 | 8 December 2023 | Polideportivo Provincial, Santiago del Estero, Argentina | Argentina | 4–1 | 4–1 | 2023–24 FIH Pro League | |
| 46 | 11 December 2023 | Polideportivo Provincial, Santiago del Estero, Argentina | Argentina | 1–0 | 7–1 | 2023–24 FIH Pro League | |
| 47 | 3 February 2024 | Kalinga Stadium, Bhubaneswar, India | United States | 6–0 | 7–0 | 2023–24 FIH Pro League | |
| 48 | 3 February 2024 | Kalinga Stadium, Bhubaneswar, India | United States | 7–0 | 7–0 | 2023–24 FIH Pro League | |
| 49 | 4 February 2024 | Kalinga Stadium, Bhubaneswar, India | India | 1–0 | 3–1 | 2023–24 FIH Pro League | |
| 50 | 4 February 2024 | Kalinga Stadium, Bhubaneswar, India | India | 3–1 | 3–1 | 2023–24 FIH Pro League | |
| 51 | 9 February 2024 | Kalinga Stadium, Bhubaneswar, India | Australia | 3–0 | 6–2 | 2023–24 FIH Pro League | |
| 52 | 9 February 2024 | Kalinga Stadium, Bhubaneswar, India | Australia | 4–1 | 6–2 | 2023–24 FIH Pro League | |
| 53 | 15 February 2024 | Birsa Munda International Hockey Stadium, Rourkela, India | China | 3–1 | 4–2 | 2023–24 FIH Pro League | |
| 54 | 18 February 2024 | Birsa Munda International Hockey Stadium, Rourkela, India | Australia | 1–0 | 3–1 | 2023–24 FIH Pro League | |
| 55 | 18 February 2024 | Birsa Munda International Hockey Stadium, Rourkela, India | Australia | 2–0 | 3–1 | 2023–24 FIH Pro League | |
| 56 | 18 February 2024 | Birsa Munda International Hockey Stadium, Rourkela, India | Australia | 3–0 | 3–1 | 2023–24 FIH Pro League | |
| 57 | 22 June 2024 | SV Kampong, Utrecht, Netherlands | Germany | 1–0 | 4–0 | 2023–24 FIH Pro League | |
| 58 | 22 June 2024 | SV Kampong, Utrecht, Netherlands | Germany | 3–0 | 4–0 | 2023–24 FIH Pro League | |
| 59 | 28 June 2024 | Wagener Stadium, Amsterdam, Netherlands | Belgium | 1–0 | 2–1 | 2023–24 FIH Pro League | |
| 60 | 28 June 2024 | Wagener Stadium, Amsterdam, Netherlands | Belgium | 2–0 | 2–1 | 2023–24 FIH Pro League | |
| 61 | 16 July 2024 | HC Zwolle, Zwolle, Netherlands | Japan | 2–0 | 6–1 | Test Match | |
| 62 | 16 July 2024 | HC Zwolle, Zwolle, Netherlands | Japan | 3–0 | 6–1 | Test Match | |
| 63 | 27 July 2024 | Stade Yves-du-Manoir, Paris, France | France | 2–0 | 6–2 | 2024 Summer Olympics | |
| 64 | 27 July 2024 | Stade Yves-du-Manoir, Paris, France | France | 3–0 | 6–2 | 2024 Summer Olympics | |
| 65 | 27 July 2024 | Stade Yves-du-Manoir, Paris, France | France | 4–1 | 6–2 | 2024 Summer Olympics | |
| 66 | 27 July 2024 | Stade Yves-du-Manoir, Paris, France | France | 5–2 | 6–2 | 2024 Summer Olympics | |
| 67 | 29 July 2024 | Stade Yves-du-Manoir, Paris, France | Germany | 1–1 | 2–1 | 2024 Summer Olympics | |
| 68 | 2 August 2024 | Stade Yves-du-Manoir, Paris, France | Belgium | 2–0 | 3–1 | 2024 Summer Olympics | |
| 69 | 3 August 2024 | Stade Yves-du-Manoir, Paris, France | Japan | 1–0 | 5–1 | 2024 Summer Olympics | |
| 70 | 7 August 2024 | Stade Yves-du-Manoir, Paris, France | Argentina | 3–0 | 3–0 | 2024 Summer Olympics | |
| 71 | 9 August 2024 | Stade Yves-du-Manoir, Paris, France | China | 1–1 | 1–1 (3–1) | 2024 Summer Olympics | |
| 72 | 11 December 2024 | Polideportivo Provincial, Santiago del Estero, Argentina | Germany | 3–0 | 6–1 | 2024–25 FIH Pro League | |
| 73 | 11 December 2024 | Polideportivo Provincial, Santiago del Estero, Argentina | Germany | 4–0 | 6–1 | 2024–25 FIH Pro League | |
| 74 | 12 December 2024 | Polideportivo Provincial, Santiago del Estero, Argentina | Argentina | 2–0 | 3–2 | 2024–25 FIH Pro League | |
| 75 | 14 December 2024 | Polideportivo Provincial, Santiago del Estero, Argentina | Germany | 2–1 | 4–1 | 2024–25 FIH Pro League | |
| 76 | 7 June 2025 | Wagener Stadium, Amsterdam, Netherlands | Australia | 1–0 | 8–1 | 2024–25 FIH Pro League | |
| 77 | 7 June 2025 | Wagener Stadium, Amsterdam, Netherlands | Australia | 3–1 | 8–1 | 2024–25 FIH Pro League | |
| 78 | 7 June 2025 | Wagener Stadium, Amsterdam, Netherlands | Australia | 6–1 | 8–1 | 2024–25 FIH Pro League | |
| 79 | 8 June 2025 | Wagener Stadium, Amsterdam, Netherlands | Australia | 3–1 | 5–1 | 2024–25 FIH Pro League | |
| 80 | 8 June 2025 | Wagener Stadium, Amsterdam, Netherlands | Australia | 4–1 | 5–1 | 2024–25 FIH Pro League | |
| 81 | 11 June 2025 | Wagener Stadium, Amsterdam, Netherlands | Spain | 1–0 | 3–2 | 2024–25 FIH Pro League | |
| 82 | 11 June 2025 | Wagener Stadium, Amsterdam, Netherlands | Spain | 3–1 | 3–2 | 2024–25 FIH Pro League | |
| 83 | 12 June 2025 | Wagener Stadium, Amsterdam, Netherlands | Spain | 2–0 | 11–2 | 2024–25 FIH Pro League | |
| 84 | 12 June 2025 | Wagener Stadium, Amsterdam, Netherlands | Spain | 3–0 | 11–2 | 2024–25 FIH Pro League | |
| 85 | 12 June 2025 | Wagener Stadium, Amsterdam, Netherlands | Spain | 7–2 | 11–2 | 2024–25 FIH Pro League | |
| 86 | 12 June 2025 | Wagener Stadium, Amsterdam, Netherlands | Spain | 8–2 | 11–2 | 2024–25 FIH Pro League | |
| 87 | 12 June 2025 | Wagener Stadium, Amsterdam, Netherlands | Spain | 9–2 | 11–2 | 2024–25 FIH Pro League | |
