= Camila Machín =

Italian-Argentine field hockey player (born 1994)

Personal information
- Born: 3 September 1994 (age 31) San Miguel de Tucumán, Argentina

Sport
- Sport: Field hockey
- Position: Defence
National team
Years	Team	Caps	Goals
2018	Argentina	2	(0)
2022–	Italy	7	(3)
Medal record
Women's field hockey
Representing Argentina
South American Games
Gold medal – first place	2018 Cochabamba	Team
Representing Italy

Camila Machín (born 3 September 1994) is an Italian-Argentine field hockey player.

== Personal life ==
Machín was born and raised in San Miguel de Tucumán, to an Italian Argentine family.

== Career ==
=== Argentina ===
In 2018, Machín made her international debut for the Argentine national team, Las Leonas. She was a member of the team at the XI South American Games in Cochabamba where she won a gold medal.

=== Italy ===
Following a four-year hiatus from international hockey, Machín returned to the world stage with the Italian national team in 2022.

She made her debut with Italy at the EuroHockey Championship Qualifiers in Vilnius. She went on to represent the team again at the inaugural edition of the FIH Nations Cup in Valencia.
