= Júlia Strappato =

Spanish field hockey player (born 2000)

Personal information
- Full name: Júlia Strappato Garreta
- Born: 16 January 2000 (age 26) Matadepera, Spain

Sport
- Sport: Field hockey
- Position: Midfield
Senior career
| Years | Team | Caps | Goals |
| – | Junior FC | - | - |
National team
| Years | Team | Caps | Goals |
| 2017–2019 | Spain U–21 | 9 | (0) |
| 2020– | Spain | 31 | (0) |
Medal record
Women's field hockey
Representing Spain
EuroHockey Junior Championship
| Gold medal – first place | 2019 Valencia | Team |

Júlia Strappato Garreta (born 16 January 2000) is a Spanish field hockey player.

== Early life ==
Júlia Strappato originates from the Matadepera municipality in Catalonia.

== Career ==
=== Domestic league ===
In the Spanish national league, the Liga Iberdrola, Strappato represents Junior FC.

=== Under–21 ===
Strappato made her debut for the Spanish U–21s in 2017, representing the team at the EuroHockey Junior Championship in Valencia.

She won a gold medal at her second EuroHockey Junior Championship two years later, again in Valencia.

=== Red Sticks ===
In 2020, Strappato made her debut for the Red Sticks. She appeared in a test series against Argentina in Mar del Plata.

She played in her first major tournament two years later, representing Spain in season three of the FIH Pro League.

== Personal life ==
Born in Spain, Strappato is of Italian descent through her father, a former rowing champion.
