= Hélène Brasseur =

Belgian field hockey player (born 2002)

Personal information
- Born: 4 January 2002 (age 24)

Sport
- Sport: Field hockey
Medal record
World Cup
| Bronze medal – third place | 2026 Wavre/Amstelveen |

Hélène Brasseur (born 4 January 2002) is a Belgian field hockey player. She represented Belgium at the 2024 Summer Olympics.
