= Clara Ycart =

Spanish field hockey player (born 1999)

Personal information
- Full name: Clara Ycart Canal
- Born: 10 January 1999 (age 27) Matadepera, Spain

Sport
- Sport: Field hockey
- Position: Defence/Mitfield
- Club: Düsseldorfer HC
National team
Years	Team	Caps	Goals
2016–2017	Spain U–18	10	(3)
2016–2017	Spain U–21	13	(4)
2017–2023	Spain	86	(8)
Medal record
Women's field hockey
Representing Spain
EuroHockey Nations Championship
Bronze medal – third place	2019 Antwerp	Team
FIH Hockey Series
Gold medal – first place	2018–19 Valencia	Team

Clara Ycart (born 10 January 1999) is an Olympic field hockey player from Spain, who plays as a defender or midfielder.

== Career ==
=== Club hockey ===
Ycart began her senior career with CD Terrassa, where she played from 2013 to 2021. During her time with the club, she achieved considerable success in the youth divisions, winning several Spanish indoor and outdoor championships. With the first women’s team, she notably won the 2016 Catalan Championship and earned a bronze medal at the 2020 Copa de la Reina.

In 2021, Ycart moved to Germany to join Düsseldorfer HC, marking one of the most successful periods of her career. Over three seasons, she won four German Championships—two indoor and two outdoor—as well as a bronze medal in the 2022 Euro Hockey League (EHL) and a gold medal at the EuroHockey Indoor Club Cup.

Ycart returned to CD Terrassa for the 2024 season before rejoining Düsseldorfer HC in 2025, where she continues to play. During her return, she added another German Indoor Championship to her record.

=== National teams ===
==== Under–18 ====
In 2015 and 2016, Ycart was a member of the Spain U–18 at the EuroHockey Youth Championship, held in Santander and Cork respectively. At both tournaments Spain finished in fifth place.

==== Under–21 ====
In 2016, Ycart was a member of the Spanish Under–21 team at the FIH Junior World Cup in Santiago.

She followed this up with an appearance at the 2017 EuroHockey Junior Championship in Valencia where the team finished fifth.

==== Red Sticks ====
Ycart made her debut for the Spanish national team, the 'Red Sticks', in 2017.

2019 was Ycart's most prominent year with the national side, winning her first medal with the team at the FIH Series Finals in Valencia, taking home gold. This was followed up with a bronze medal performance at the EuroHockey Championships in Antwerp.

She made her Olympic debut at the 2020 Tokyo Olympic Games (held in 2021), where the Spanish national team finished seventh. The following year, she competed in the 2022 Women’s Hockey World Cup, co-hosted by Terrassa and Amstelveen, achieving the same seventh-place result.

In 2023, Ycart took part in the EuroHockey Nations Championship in Mönchengladbach, which marked her final appearance with the national team.
