= Elena Sotgiu =

Belgian field hockey player

Personal information
- Born: 18 July 1995 (age 31)

Sport
- Sport: Field hockey
- Position: Goalkeeper
- Club: Braxgata HC
National team
Years	Team	Caps	Goals
–	Belgium	35	(0)
Medal record
World Cup
Bronze medal – third place	2026 Wavre/Amstelveen
EuroHockey Championship
Silver medal – second place	2023 Mönchengladbach
Bronze medal – third place	2021 Amstelveen

Elena Sotgiu (born 18 July 1995) is a Belgian field hockey player for the Belgian national team.

She participated at the 2018 Women's Hockey World Cup.
