= Sara Barrios =

Spanish field hockey player (born 2000)

Personal information
- Full name: Sara Barrios Navarro
- Born: 4 September 2000 (age 25) Madrid, Spain

Sport
- Sport: Field hockey
- Position: Forward
Senior career
| Years | Team | Caps | Goals |
| – | Club de Campo | - | - |
National team
| Years | Team | Caps | Goals |
| 2017–2019 | Spain U–21 | 9 | (2) |
| 2022– | Spain | 32 | (3) |
Medal record
Women's field hockey
Representing Spain
EuroHockey Championship
| Bronze medal – third place | 2025 Mönchengladbach |
EuroHockey Junior Championship
| Gold medal – first place | 2019 Valencia |

Sara Barrios Navarro (Note: In this Spanish name, the first or paternal surname is Barrios and the second or maternal family name is Navarro.) (born 4 September 2000) is a Spanish field hockey player.

== Personal life ==
Sara Barrios has a twin sister, Laura, who also plays for the Spanish national team.

== Career ==
=== Domestic league ===
In the Spanish national league, the Liga Iberdrola, Barrios represents the Club de Campo.

=== Under–21 ===
Barrios made her debut for the Spanish U–21s in 2017, representing the team at the EuroHockey Junior Championship in Valencia.

She won a gold medal at her second EuroHockey Junior Championship two years later, again in Valencia.

=== Red Sticks ===
In 2022, Barrios was named in the Red Sticks squad for the first time. She made her debut during season three of the FIH Pro League. She played in her first major tournament later that year, representing Spain at the FIH World Cup in Amsterdam and Terrassa.
