= Lucie Breyne =

Belgian field hockey player (born 2000)

Personal information
- Born: 5 October 2000 (age 25)

Sport
- Sport: Field hockey
- Position: Defence
- Club: Waterloo Ducks
National team
Years	Team	Caps	Goals
2018	Belgium U–18	5	(0)
2019–	Belgium U–21	5	(2)
2018–	Belgium	40	(2)
Medal record
Women's field hockey
Representing Belgium
EuroHockey Championship
Silver medal – second place	2023 Mönchengladbach
EuroHockey Youth Championship
Silver medal – second place	2018 Valencia

Lucie Breyne (born 5 October 2000) is a Belgian field hockey player, who plays as a defender.

== Career ==
=== Club hockey ===
In the Belgian Hockey League, Breyne plays club hockey for the Waterloo Ducks.

=== National teams ===
==== Under–18 ====
In 2018, Lucie Breyne was a member of the Belgium U–18 team at the EuroHockey Youth Championship in Santander. At the tournament, Belgium finished in second place, taking home silver.

==== Under–21 ====
Following her debut for the Under–18 side in 2018, Breyne appeared in the national Under–21 side in 2019. She represented the team at the EuroHockey Junior Championship in Valencia. The team finished fourth, qualifying for the 2021 FIH Junior World Cup.

==== Red Panthers ====
Lucie Breyne made her debut for the Belgium 'Red Panthers' in 2018 during a test series against the United States in Lancaster.

In 2019, Breyne appeared for Belgium during the inaugural tournament of the FIH Pro League.

=== International goals ===
Goal	Date	Location	Opponent	Goal(s)	Result	Competition
1	16 May 2021	Antwerp, Sportcentrum Wilrijkse Plein-Antwerp, Belgium	BEL VS USA	6–0	6–1	2020-21 FIH Hockey Pro League
1	13 February 2022	Buenos Aires, Cenard, Argentina	ARG VS BEL	0–1	3–1	2021-22 FIH Hockey Pro League
