= Sarah Torrans =

Irish field hockey player (born 1999)

Personal information
- Nationality: Ireland
- Born: 14 February 1999 (age 27)
- Height: 1.63 m (5 ft 4 in)

Sport
- Sport: Field hockey

Sarah Torrans (born 14 February 1999) is an Irish field hockey player. She competed in the 2020 Summer Olympics.
