= Ivanna Pessina =

Italian-Argentine field hockey player (born 1990)

Personal information
- Born: 18 April 1990 (age 36) Buenos Aires, Argentina

Sport
- Sport: Field hockey
- Position: Defender
- Club: Braxgata
National team
| Years | Team | Caps | Goals |
| 2014 | Argentina | 10 | - |
| 2018– | Italy | 65 | (7) |

Ivanna Pessina (born 18 April 1990) is an Italian-Argentine field hockey player who plays for the Italy national team.

== Personal life ==
Ivanna was born in Buenos Aires to an Italian Argentine family. She currently plays representative hockey for the Braxgata Hockey Club.

== Career ==
=== Argentina ===
She had a brief successful performance in the national team "Las Leonas" in the South American Games Odesur 2014 Senior Women Outdoor 8 to 16 Mar 2014 where they won the championship title.

=== Italy ===
Pessina made her debut for the Italian Senior National Team at the 2018 Women's Hockey World Cup. Some of the latest participations, FIH Hockey Women's Nation Cup Spain 2022 11 to 17 Dec 2022 Valencia; EuroHockey Championship 2023 18 - 27 Aug 2023 Mönchengladbach, Germany and the most recent Olympic Qualifiers 2024 Ranchi 13 to 19 Jan 2024 in Jharkhand, India.
