= Adrian Lock =

English field hockey coach

Adrian Lock is an English field hockey coach of the Spanish women's national team.

He coached the team at the 2018 Women's Hockey World Cup.
