= Patricia Álvarez =

Spanish field hockey player

Personal information
- Full name: Patricia Álvarez Nárdiz
- Born: 4 March 1998 (age 28) Santander, Spain

Sport
- Sport: Field hockey
- Position: Forward
- Club: Real Club de Polo
National team
Years	Team	Caps	Goals
2019	Spain U–21	6	(3)
2021–	Spain	39	(7)
Medal record
Women's field hockey
Representing Spain
EuroHockey Championship
Bronze medal – third place	2025 Mönchengladbach
FIH Nations Cup
Gold medal – first place	2023–24 Terrassa
Silver medal – second place	2022–23 Valencia
EuroHockey Junior Championship
Gold medal – first place	2019 Valencia

Patricia Álvarez Nárdiz (Note: In this Spanish name, the first or paternal surname is Álvarez and the second or maternal family name is Nárdiz.) (born 4 March 1998) is a field hockey player from Spain.

== Personal life ==
Patricia Álvarez was born and raised in Santander, Spain. She is a student at the Universidad Complutense de Madrid.

== Career ==
=== Under–21 ===
Patricia Álvarez made her debut for the Spanish U–21 side in 2019 at the EuroHockey Junior Championship in Valencia. At the tournament she won a gold medal.

=== Las Redsticks ===
Álvarez made her senior debut for Las Redsticks in 2021 at the EuroHockey Championships in Amstelveen.

She was named in the Spain squad for the 2021–22 FIH Pro League.
