= Justine Rasir =

Belgian field hockey player

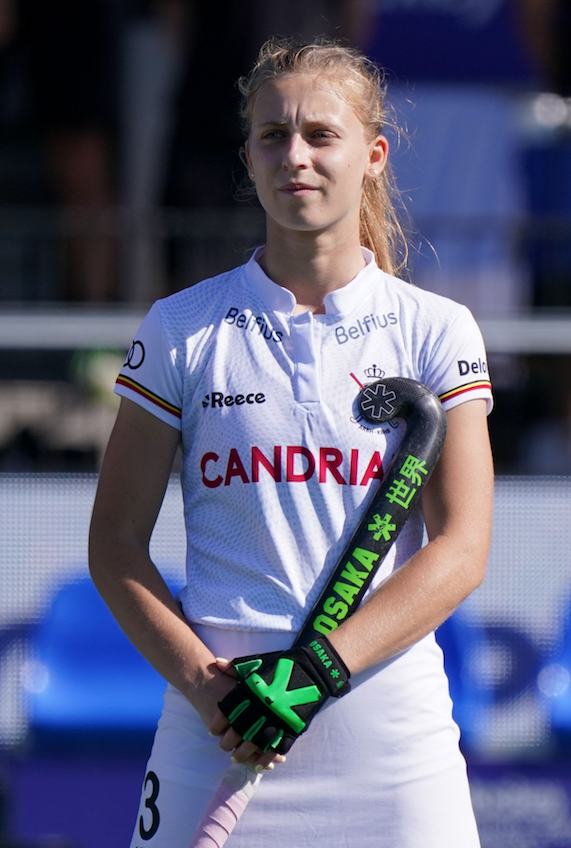

Personal information
- Born: 4 December 2001 (age 24)

Sport
- Sport: Field hockey
- Position: FW
- Club: Royal Racing Club
National team
Years	Team	Caps	Goals
2018	Belgium U–18	5	(0)
2019–	Belgium U–21	5	(1)
–	Belgium	59	(6)
Medal record
Women's field hockey
Representing Belgium
World Cup
Bronze medal – third place	2026 Wavre/Amstelveen
European Championship
Bronze medal – third place	2021 Amstelveen
Silver medal – second place	2023 Mönchengladbach
EuroHockey Youth Championship
Silver medal – second place	2018 Valencia

Justine Rasir (born 4 December 2001) is a Belgian field hockey player, who plays as a striker.

== Career ==
=== Club hockey ===
In the Belgian Hockey League, Rasir plays club hockey for the Royal Racing Club.

=== National teams ===
==== Under–18 ====
In 2018, Rasir was a member of the Belgium U–18 team at the EuroHockey Youth Championship in Santander. At the tournament, Belgium finished in second place, taking home silver.

==== Under–21 ====
Following her debut for the Under–18 side in 2018, Rasir appeared in the national Under–21 side in 2019. She represented the team at the EuroHockey Junior Championship in Valencia. The team finished fourth, qualifying for the 2021 FIH Junior World Cup.

==== Red Panthers ====
In December 2019, Justine Rasir was named in the Red Panthers squad for the first time. She was named in the provisional Belgian squad for the second season of the FIH Pro League.

=== International goals ===
Goal	Date	Location	Opponent	Goal(s)	Result	Competition
2	19 June 2022	London, Lee Valley Hockey and Tennis Centre, United-Kingdom	GB VS BEL	0-1/1-4	1–4	2021-22 FIH Hockey Pro League
3	9 July 2022	Amsterdam, Wagener Hockey Stadium, Netherlands	CHIL VS BEL	0-2	0–5	FIH Hockey Women's World Cup Spain & Netherlands 2022
4	3 June 2023	London, Lee Valley Hockey and Tennis Centre, United-Kingdom	CHINA VS BEL	0-1	1–3	2021-22 FIH Hockey Pro League
5	22 August 2023	Mönchengladbach, Hockeypark Mönchengladbach, Germany	ESP VS BEL	0–3	0–5	EuroHockey Championship 2023 Women
6	18 January 2023	Valencia, Estadio Betero, Spain	BEL VS GB	2–2	3–2	FIH Hockey Olympic Qualifiers 2024 Valencia
7	August 2024	Paris, Stade Yves du Manoir		–	–	2024 Paris Olympic Games
8	9 August 2024	Paris, Stade Yves du Manoir	ARG VS BEL	2–2	2–2	2024 Paris Olympic Games
9	5 December June 2024	Hangzhou, China	ENG VS BEL	2-2	2–8	2024–25 FIH Hockey Pro League

|}
