= Emma Puvrez =

Belgian field hockey player

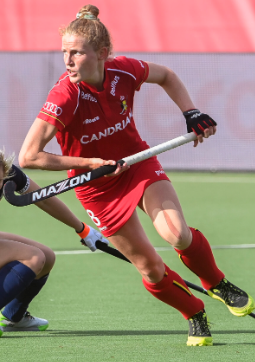

Personal information
- Born: 25 July 1997 (age 29)

Sport
- Sport: Field hockey
- Position: Defender
- Club: Royal Racing Bruxelles
National team
Years	Team	Caps	Goals
–	Belgium	169	(11)
Medal record
World Cup
Bronze medal – third place	2026 Wavre/Amstelveen
European Championship
Silver medal – second place	2023 Mönchengladbach
Bronze medal – third place	2021 Amstelveen

Emma Puvrez (born 25 July 1997) is a Belgian field hockey player for the Belgian national team.

She participated at the 2018 Women's Hockey World Cup.
