= Renée van Laarhoven =

Dutch field hockey player

Personal information
- Born: 15 October 1997 (age 28)

Sport
- Sport: Field hockey
- Position: Defender
- Club: Kampong
National team
Years	Team	Caps	Goals
2018–	Netherlands	6	-
Medal record
Olympic Games
Gold medal – first place	2024 Paris	Team
World Cup
Gold medal – first place	2022 Terrassa/Amstelveen
Silver medal – second place	2026 Wavre/Amstelveen
EuroHockey Championship
Gold medal – first place	2023 Mönchengladbach
Gold medal – first place	2025 Mönchengladbach
Champions Trophy
Gold medal – first place	2018 Changzhou

Renée van Laarhoven (born 15 October 1997) is a Dutch field hockey player. Van Laarhoven is currently playing for SCHC.

Van Laarhoven made her debut for the Netherlands national team on the 17th of November 2018 in a match against Japan during the 2018 Champions Trophy in Changzhou, China. The Dutch team, with van Laarhoven, won the gold medal at this tournament.
