= Laura Barrios =

Spanish field hockey player (born 2000)

Personal information
- Full name: Laura Barrios Navarro
- Born: 4 September 2000 (age 25) Madrid, Spain
- Height: 165 cm (5 ft 5 in)
- Weight: 59 kg (130 lb)

Sport
- Country: Spain
- Sport: Field hockey

Laura Barrios Navarro (Note: In this Spanish name, the first or paternal surname is Barrios and the second or maternal family name is Navarro.) (born 4 September 2000) is a Spanish field hockey player. She competed in the 2020 Summer Olympics.
