= Spain women's national under-21 field hockey team =

Spain
- Association: Royal Spanish Hockey Federation (Real Federación Española de Hockey)
- Confederation: EHF (Europe)
- Head Coach: Jorge Perez
- Manager: Raul Gomez
- Captain: Berta Serrahima

Junior World Cup
- Appearances: 9 (first in 1993)
- Best result: 4th (2016)

EuroHockey Junior Championship
- Appearances: 22 (first in 1977)
- Best result: (gold) 1st (2019)
Medal record
EuroHockey Junior Championship
Gold medal – first place	2019 Valencia
Silver medal – second place	2012 's-Hertogenbosch
Silver medal – second place	2024 Terrassa
Silver medal – second place	2026 Valencia
Bronze medal – third place	1978 Celle
Bronze medal – third place	1981 Barcelona
Bronze medal – third place	1992 Edinburgh
Bronze medal – third place	2010 Lille

The Spain women's national under-21 field hockey team represents Spain in women's international under-21 field hockey and is controlled by the Royal Spanish Hockey Federation, the governing body for field hockey in Spain.

The team competes in the EuroHockey Junior Championships where their best result was winning the gold medal in 2019. They have qualified for every Junior World Cup except the first one, their best result was the fourth-place finish in 2016.

== Tournament record ==
=== Junior World Cup ===
- 1993 – 7th place
- 1997 – 9th place
- 2001 – 10th place
- 2005 – 6th place
- 2009 – 13th place
- 2013 – 5th place
- 2016 – 4th place
- 2022 – Withdrew
- 2023 – 8th place
- 2025 – 9th place
- 2027 – Qualified

=== EuroHockey Junior Championship ===
- 1977 – 6th place
- 1978 – (bronze)
- 1979 – 4th place
- 1981 – (bronze)
- 1984 – 4th place
- 1988 – 5th place
- 1992 – (bronze)
- 1996 – 5th place
- 1998 – 4th place
- 2000 – 5th place
- 2002 – 5th place
- 2004 – 5th place
- 2006 – 4th place
- 2008 – 5th place
- 2010 – (bronze)
- 2012 – (silver)
- 2014 – 4th place
- 2017 – 5th place
- 2019 – (gold)
- 2022 – 5th place
- 2024 – (silver)
- 2026 – (silver)

== See also ==
- Spain men's national under-21 field hockey team
- Spain women's national field hockey team
