= 2024–25 Women's FIH Pro League squads =

This article lists the squads of all participating teams in the 2024–25 Women's FIH Pro League.

== Argentina ==
The following is the Argentina squad for the 2024–25 FIH Pro League.

Head coach: Fernando Ferrara

2. Sofía Toccalino
3. Agustina Gorzelany
4. Valentina Raposo
5. Agostina Alonso
6. Emilia Forcherio
7. Agustina Albertario
10. María José Granatto (C)
13. Cristina Cosentino (GK)
15. Ana Luz Dodorico (GK)
18. Victoria Sauze
19. Victoria Manuele
20. Sofía Cairó
21. Victoria Granatto
22. Eugenia Trinchinetti
23. Lara Casas
24. Celina di Santo
25. Juana Castellaro
28. Julieta Jankunas
29. Victoria Miranda
30. Paula Santamarina
31. Valentina Marcucci
32. Valentina Costa Biondi
33. Zoe Díaz
34. Catalina Alimenti
35. Valentina Ferola
36. Stefanía Antoniazzi
37. Malena Sábez
38. Chiara Ambrosini
39. Ariana Arias
40. Mercedes Artola (GK)
41. Candela Esandi
42. Victoria Falasco
43. Emma Knobl
44. Sol Lombardo
45. Catalina Andrade
46. Lourdes Pisthón
47. Julieta Arcidiácono
48. Lourdes Pérez Iturraspe (GK)
49. Agustina Capobianco
50. María Larsen
51. Paula Ortiz
52. Mariana Scandura (GK)
60. Brisa Bruggesser

== Australia ==
The following is the Australia squad for the 2024–25 FIH Pro League.

Head coach: Katrina Powell

1. Claire Colwill
3. Morgan Mathison
4. Amy Lawton
5. Grace Young
6. Penny Squibb
7. Aleisha Power (GK)
8. Maddison Brooks
9. Maddison Smith
10. Abigail Wilson
11. Alice Arnott
12. Greta Hayes
13. Harriet Shand
15. Kaitlin Nobbs (C)
16. Courtney Schonell
17. Lucy Sharman
18. Alana Kavanagh
19. Jocelyn Bartram (GK)
20. Karri Somerville
21. Jade Smith
22. Tatum Stewart
24. Mariah Williams
25. Zoe Newman (GK)
26. Lexie Pickering
28. Hannah Cullum-Sanders
30. Grace Stewart (C)
33. Sarah Byrnes
34. Evelyn Dalton (GK)
35. Casey Dolkens
36. Kendra Fitzpatrick
37. Neasa Flynn
39. Ruby Harris
40. Phillipa Morgan
45. Jesse Reid
46. Olivia Downes
47. Bridget Laurance (GK)
50. Josie Lawton
52. Dayle Dolkens
73. Karissa van der Wath
78. Jamie-Lee Surha

== Belgium ==
The following is the Belgium squad for the 2024–25 FIH Pro League.

Head coach: (Netherlands) Rein van Eijk

1. Justine Rasir
2. Delphine Marien
6. Charlotte Englebert
7. Judith Vandermeiren
8. Emma Puvrez
9. Emily White
11. Perrine de Clerck
13. Alix Gerniers (C)
14. Alix Marien
15. Vanessa Blockmans
17. Michelle Struijk (C)
18. Felicia Theunissen
19. Hélène Brasseur
22. Stéphanie Vanden Borre
23. Elena Sotgiu (GK)
26. Lien Hillewaert
28. Lisa Moors
29. Elodie Picard (GK)
30. Ambre Ballenghien
31. Lucie Breyne
32. Louise Dewaet
33. Maïté Bussels (GK)
40. Camille Belis
41. Astrid Bonami
42. Noa Schreurs

The remainder of the squad is as follows:

27. Loes Palifet
34. Emma Plets
35. Chloé Delhalle
38. Ilke Cuffez
39. Agathe Favart
44. Maxine Bertram
45. Marthe-Marie Geerts
46. Fee van den Abeele
48. Louise van Herendael
50. Fien Stockbroekx
51. Emilie Verhees

== China ==
The following is the China squad for the 2024–25 FIH Pro League.

Head coach: (Australia) Alyson Annan

1. Ye Jiao (GK)
2. Gu Bingfeng
3. Yang Liu
5. Li Jiaqi
6. Zhang Ying
7. Chen Yi
8. Gu Yangyan
9. Ma Ning
10. Zhang Xindan
12. Huang Haiyan
13. Li Hong (C)
14. Zhang Heyang
15. Xu Wenjuan
16. Ou Zixia (C)
17. Dan Wen
18. Zou Meirong
19. Zhang Xiaoxue
20. He Jiangxin
21. Zheng Jiali
22. Zhou Yu
23. Fan Yunxia
25. Yang Haoting
26. Chen Yang
27. Xu Wenyu
28. Luo Tiantian
29. Liu Ping (GK)
30. Zhou Ying (GK)
31. Zhong Jiaqi
32. Li Xinhuan (GK)
33. Zhang Dian
34. Zeng Xueling
35. Tan Jinzhuang
36. Liu Chencheng
38. Chen Jiali
39. Xu Yanan
51. Liu Hua
52. Yuan Meng
53. Chen Tong
56. Hao Guoting
58. Yu Anhui
60. Feng Li

== England ==
The following is the England squad for the 2024–25 FIH Pro League.

Head coach: (Scotland) David Ralph

2. Darcy Bourne
3. Rebecca Manton
5. Alexandra Malzer
6. Anna Toman
8. Lorna Mackenzie
10. Sofia Martin
11. Holly Hunt
13. Elena Rayer
14. Tessa Howard
15. Mila Welch (GK)
16. Isabelle Petter
17. Georgina Gardens
18. Katherine Curtis
19. Olivia Hamilton
20. Hollie Pearne-Webb (C)
21. Fiona Crackles
22. Elizabeth Neal
23. Sophie Hamilton (C)
24. Madeleine Axford
24. Camilla Giglio
25. Sabbie Heesh (GK)
26. Lily Owsley
27. Joanne Pinner
28. Flora Peel
30. Martha Taylor
31. Grace Balsdon
32. Bethan Alexander
34. Paige Gillott
35. Hannah Boss
36. Megan Crowson
37. Abbie Dixon
39. Alice Atkinson
40. Miriam Pritchard (GK)
41. Lily Walker (C)
42. Pippa Lock
43. Evie Wood
44. Charlotte Bingham
45. Rosemary Hope

== Germany ==
The following is the Germany squad for the 2024–25 FIH Pro League.

Head coach: Valentin Altenburg

1. Mia Böhringer (GK)
2. Jule Bleuel
3. Amelie Wortmann
5. Selin Oruz (C)
6. Benedetta Wenzel
9. Pauline Heinz
10. Lisa Nolte
11. Lena Micheel
15. Nathalie Kubalski (GK)
17. Lynn Krings
18. Lilly Stoffelsma
19. Finja Starck (GK)
21. Sara Strauss
23. Emma Davidsmeyer
25. Viktoria Huse (C)
26. Felicia Wiedermann
27. Stine Kurz
28. Jette Fleschütz
30. Hanna Granitzki
31. Linnea Weidemann
32. Chiara Fischer (GK)
33. Julia Hemmerle
34. Aina Kresken
35. Marie Fischer
36. Lisa Schneider (GK)
38. Sophia Schwabe
41. Lena Frerichs
42. Charlotte Gerstenhöfer
44. Taja Gans
47. Klara Batschko
48. Joana Böhringer
55. Emilia Landshut
56. Johanna Hachenberg
66. Katharina Haid
71. Yara Mandel

== India ==
The following is the India squad for the 2024–25 FIH Pro League.

Head coach: Harendra Singh

1. Jyoti Chhatri
2. Jyoti Singh
7. Sharmila Devi
8. Nikki Pradhan
9. Bichu Devi Kharibam (GK)
11. Savita Punia (GK)
14. Sangita Kumari
15. Mumtaz Khan
16. Vandana Katariya
18. Udita Duhan
19. Vaishnavi Phalke
20. Lalremsiami Hmarzote
22. Baljeet Kaur
24. Jyoti Rumavat
25. Navneet Kaur
27. Sushila Chanu
29. Sunelita Toppo
30. Salima Tete (C)
32. Neha Goyal
33. Preeti Dubey
35. Rutuja Pisal
39. Sakshi Rana
45. Manisha Chauhan
50. Ishika Chaudhary
52. Beauty Dungdung
55. Deepika Sehrawat

== Netherlands ==
The following is the Netherlands squad for the 2024–25 FIH Pro League.

Head coach: Raoul Ehren

1. Anne Veenendaal (GK)
2. Luna Fokke
3. Rosa Fernig
4. Freeke Moes
5. Lisa Post
7. Xan de Waard
8. Yibbi Jansen
9. Renée van Laarhoven
10. Felice Albers
12. Stella van Gils
14. Sanne Koolen
15. Frédérique Matla
16. Joosje Burg
17. Marleen Jochems
18. Pien Sanders (C)
19. Marijn Veen
20. Laura Nunnink
21. Pien Dicke
22. Josine Koning (GK)
23. Jip Dicke
24. Emma Reijnen
25. Noor van den Nieuwenhof
26. Maud van den Heuvel
27. Mikki Roberts
28. Trijntje Beljaars
29. Fay van der Elst
30. Babette Backers (GK)
31. Maria Steensma
32. Imke Verstraeten
33. Mette Winter
34. Eline Jansen
35. Pam van der Laan
36. Danique van der Veerdonk
37. Guusje Moes
40. Sophia ter Kuile (GK)

== Spain ==
The following is the Spain squad for the 2024–25 FIH Pro League.

Head coach: Carlos García Cuenca

5. Berta Serrahima
6. Clara Badia
7. Florencia Amundson
8. Lucía Jiménez (C)
9. Teresa Lima
10. Patricia Álvarez
11. Marta Segú
12. Teresa Sáenz de Santa María
13. Constanza Amundson
15. María Gestí
16. Candela Mejías
17. Luciana Molina
18. Berta Agulló
19. Laura Bosch
20. Xantal Giné (C)
21. Jone Alba
22. Laia Vidosa
23. Carmen Fernández
24. Estel Petchamé
26. Clara Pérez (GK)
27. Paula Fernández
28. María Tello (GK)
29. Paula Jiménez
30. Sofía Rogoski
31. Meritxell Vizcaíno
32. Jana Martínez (GK)
