= 2023–24 Women's FIH Pro League squads =

This article lists the squads of all participating teams in the 2023–24 Women's FIH Pro League.

== Argentina ==
The following is the Argentina squad for the 2023–24 FIH Pro League.

Head coach: Fernando Ferrara

2. Sofía Toccalino
3. Agustina Gorzelany
4. Valentina Raposo
5. Agostina Alonso (C)
7. Agustina Albertario
10. María José Granatto (C)
11. Delfina Thome
13. Cristina Cosentino (GK)
14. Clara Barberi (GK)
15. Ana Luz Dodorico (GK)
16. Bárbara Dichiara
17. Rocío Sánchez Moccia (C)
18. Victoria Sauze (C)
19. Victoria Manuele
20. Sofía Cairó
22. Eugenia Trinchinetti
24. Celina di Santo
26. Pilar Campoy
28. Julieta Jankunas
29. Victoria Miranda
31. Valentina Marcucci
32. Valentina Costa Biondi
34. Lucía Sanguinetti
35. Bianca Donati
36. Stefanía Antoniazzi
37. Carolina Carrizo
41. Micaela Sirera
42. Guadalupe Adorno
43. Sol Pagella
44. Sol Lombardo
45. Catalina Andrade
46. Daiana Pacheco
47. Mariana Pineda
48. Lourdes Pérez Iturraspe (GK)
49. Alina Piccardo
50. Juana Castellaro
51. Mercedes Artola (GK)
52. Yasmín Pallottini (GK)
53. Valentina Ferola
54. Paula Santamarina
55. Zoe Díaz
56. Martina Rosenbrock
57. Ariana Arias
58. Brisa Ruggeri
59. Emilia Larsen
60. Brisa Bruggesser
61. Lara Casas
62. Emma Tarquini
63. Victoria Falasco
64. Malena Sabez
65. Martina Altamirano
66. Pilar Pisthon
67. Pilar Palacio
68. Catalina Stamati
69. Delfina Petre
70. Josefina Esnaola

== Australia ==
The following is the Australia squad for the 2023–24 FIH Pro League.

Head coach: Katrina Powell

1. Claire Colwill
2. Ambrosia Malone
3. Brooke Peris (C)
4. Amy Lawton
5. Grace Young
6. Penny Squibb
7. Aleisha Power (GK)
8. Maddison Brooks
9. Shanea Tonkin
10. Madison Fitzpatrick
11. Alice Arnott
12. Greta Hayes
13. Harriet Shand
14. Stephanie Kershaw
15. Kaitlin Nobbs
16. Courtney Schonell
17. Lucy Sharman
18. Jane Claxton (C)
19. Jocelyn Bartram (GK)
20. Karri Somerville
21. Renee Taylor
22. Tatum Stewart
24. Mariah Williams
28. Hannah Cullum-Sanders
29. Rebecca Greiner
30. Grace Stewart
37. Morgan Gallagher
40. Phillipa Morgan
41. Zoe Newman (GK)
42. Maddison Smith
44. Abigail Wilson
46. Olivia Downes
49. Alana Kavanagh
51. Aisling Utri
52. Dayle Dolkens

== Belgium ==
The following is the Belgium squad for the 2023–24 FIH Pro League.

Head coach: (Netherlands) Raoul Ehren

1. Maïté Bussels (GK)
3. Justine Rasir
4. Delphine Marien
5. Abigail Raye
6. Charlotte Englebert
7. Judith Vandermeiren
8. Emma Puvrez
9. Emily White
10. Louise Versavel
13. Alix Gerniers (C)
15. Vanessa Blockmans
16. Tiphaine Duquesne
17. Michelle Struijk (C)
19. Barbara Nelen (C)
20. France de Mot
21. Aisling D'Hooghe (GK)
22. Stéphanie Vanden Borre
23. Elena Sotgiu (GK)
25. Pauline Leclef
26. Lien Hillewaert
27. Loes Palfliet
28. Lisa Moors
29. Elodie Picard (GK)
30. Ambre Ballenghien
31. Lucie Breyne
33. Alexia 't Serstevens
34. Emma Plets
35. Chloé Delhalle
36. Hélène Brasseur
37. Perrine de Clerck
39. Carolien Jakus
40. Camille Belis
41. Astrid Bonami
42. Maura Conelissens
43. Noa de Kerchove
44. Louise Dewaet
45. Marthe-Marie Geerts
46. Nael Goeminne
47. Eva Goffinet
48. Lauren Maertens
49. Alix Marien
50. Marie Royakkers (GK)
51. Noa Shreurs
52. Margaux Coudron
53. Ophelie Vincent

== China ==
The following is the China squad for the 2023–24 FIH Pro League.

Head coach: (Australia) Alyson Annan

1. Ye Jiao (GK)
2. Gu Bingfeng
3. Yang Liu
5. Li Jiaqi
6. Zhang Ying
7. Chen Yi
8. Gu Yangyan
9. Ma Ning
10. Zhang Xindan
12. Huang Haiyan
13. Li Hong (C)
15. Xu Wenjuan
16. Ou Zixia (C)
17. Dan Wen
18. Zou Meirong
19. Zhang Xiaoxue (GK)
20. He Jiangxin
22. Zhou Yu
23. Fan Yunxia
25. Yang Haoting
26. Chen Yang
27. Xu Wenyu
28. Luo Tiantian
29. Liu Ping (GK)
30. Zhou Ying (GK)
31. Zhong Jiaqi
32. Li Xinhuan (GK)
33. Zhang Dian
34. Zeng Xueling
35. Tan Jinzhuang
36. Liu Chencheng
38. Chen Jiali
39. Xu Yanan
51. Liu Hua
52. Yuan Meng
53. Chen Tong
56. Hao Guoting
58. Yu Anhui
60. Feng Li

== Germany ==
The following is the Germany squad for the 2023–24 FIH Pro League.

Head coach: Valentin Altenburg

1. Noelle Rother (GK)
2. Kira Horn
3. Amelie Wortmann
4. Nike Lorenz (C)
5. Selin Oruz
6. Benedetta Wenzel
8. Anne Schröder
10. Lisa Nolte
11. Lena Micheel
12. Charlotte Stapenhorst
13. Jule Bleuel
15. Nathalie Kubalski (GK)
16. Sonja Zimmermann (C)
17. Pauline Heinz
18. Lilly Stoffelsma
19. Lisa Schütze
20. Julia Sonntag (GK)
21. Sara Strauss
22. Cécile Pieper
23. Emma Davidsmeyer
24. Pia Maertens
25. Viktoria Huse
26. Felicia Wiedermann
27. Stine Kurz
28. Jette Fleschütz
29. Laura Saenger
30. Hanna Granitzki
31. Linnea Weidemann
36. Lisa Schneider (GK)
41. Lena Frerichs

== Great Britain ==
The following is the Great Britain squad for the 2023–24 FIH Pro League.

Head coach: (Scotland) David Ralph

2. Darcy Bourne
3. Amy Tennant (GK)
4. Laura Roper
5. Alexandra Malzer
6. Anna Toman
7. Hannah French
8. Sarah Jones
9. Amy Costello
10. Sarah Robertson
11. Holly Hunt
12. Charlotte Watson
13. Elena Rayer
14. Tessa Howard
15. Fiona Burnet
16. Isabelle Petter
17. Katie Robertson
18. Giselle Ansley
19. Olivia Hamilton
20. Hollie Pearne-Webb (C)
21. Fiona Crackles
22. Elizabeth Neal
23. Sophie Hamilton
25. Sabbie Heesh (GK)
26. Lily Owsley
27. Joanne Hunter
28. Flora Peel
29. Jennifer Eadie
30. Martha Taylor
31. Grace Balsdon
40. Miriam Pritchard (GK)
41. Lily Walker
45. Mila Welch (GK)
46. Jessica Buchanan (GK)
47. Evie Wood (GK)

== India ==
The following is the India squad for the 2023–24 FIH Pro League.

Head coach: (Netherlands) Janneke Schopman

2. Gurjit Kaur
4. Monika Malik
5. Sonika Tandi
7. Sharmila Devi
8. Nikki Pradhan
9. Bichu Devi Kharibam (GK)
11. Savita Punia (C, GK)
14. Sangita Kumari
15. Nisha Warsi
16. Vandana Katariya
17. Mumtaz Khan
18. Udita Duhan
19. Vaishnavi Phalke
20. Lalremsiami
22. Baljeet Kaur
24. Jyoti Rumawat
25. Navneet Kaur
29. Sunelita Toppo
30. Salima Tete
32. Neha Goyal
50. Ishika Chaudhary
52. Beauty Dungdung
55. Deepika Kumari
64. Jyoti Chhatri

== Netherlands ==
The following is the Netherlands squad for the 2023–24 FIH Pro League.

Head coach: Paul van Ass

1. Anne Veenendaal (GK)
2. Luna Fokke
3. Rosa Fernig
4. Freeke Moes
5. Lisa Post
6. Ilse Kappelle
7. Xan de Waard (C)
8. Yibbi Jansen
9. Renée van Laarhoven
10. Felice Albers
11. Maria Verschoor
14. Sanne Koolen
15. Frédérique Matla
16. Joosje Burg
18. Pien Sanders
19. Marijn Veen
20. Laura Nunnink
21. Pien Dicke
22. Josine Koning (GK)
23. Margot van Geffen
24. Eva Drummond
26. Elzemiek Zandee
27. Marleen Jochems
29. Fay van der Elst
31. Maria Steensma

== United States ==
The following is the United States squad for the 2023–24 FIH Pro League.

Head coach: (Republic of Ireland) David Passmore

1. Abigail Tamer
2. Meredith Sholder
3. Ashley Sessa
4. Danielle Grega
5. Olivia Bent-Cole
6. Megan Rodgers
7. Jillian Wolgemuth
8. Brooke DeBerdine
9. Madeleine Zimmer
12. Amanda Golini (C)
13. Ashley Hoffman
14. Sanne Caarls
15. Fusine Govaert
16. Linnea Gonzales
17. Elizabeth Yeager
19. Josie Hollamon
20. Leah Crouse
21. Alexandra Hammel
22. Jacqueline Sumfest
24. Kelee LePage
25. Karlie Kisha
26. Hope Rose
27. Emma DeBerdine
28. Mia Abello
29. Bethany Dykema
30. Kealsie Robles (GK)
31. Kelsey Bing (GK)
32. Jennifer Rizzo (GK)
