= 2024–25 Women's FIH Pro League =

- Dates: 30 November 2024 – 29 June 2025
- Teams: 9 (from 4 confederations)

Final positions
- Champions: Netherlands (5th title)
- Runner-up: Argentina
- Third place: Belgium

Tournament statistics
- Matches played: 72
- Goals scored: 304 (4.22 per match)
- Top scorer: (Netherlands) Yibbi Jansen (19 goals)

The 2024–25 Women's FIH Pro League was the sixth edition of the Women's FIH Pro League, a field hockey championship for women's national teams. The tournament began on 30 November 2024 and finished on 29 June 2025.

== Format ==
The home and away principle was kept for the season, which was divided into date blocks. To assist with competition planning, international and national, several teams gathered in one venue to contest “mini-tournaments," wherein they each played two matches against one another.

If one of the two matches played between two teams was cancelled, the winner of the other match received double points.

This season winner earned direct qualification for the 2026 World Cup.

== Teams ==
Following their win of the 2023–24 FIH Nations Cup, the promoted team Spain replace the relegated team of the last season of the 2023–24 FIH Pro League the United States.

- Argentina
- Australia
- Belgium
- China
- England
- Germany
- India
- Netherlands
- Spain

== Venues and stages ==
Following is a list of all venues and host cities across the world. Tournament hosts in parentheses.

December	February	June
Belgium; China (host); England	Australia (host); China; Spain	Argentina; Spain (host)
Argentina (host); Germany; Netherlands	England; Germany; India (host); Netherlands; Spain	Australia; China; Netherlands (host); Spain
	Argentina (host); Australia; Belgium	Argentina; Australia; England (host); India; Spain
		Belgium (host); Germany; India; Netherlands; Spain
Argentina; Australia; China; England; Germany (host); India

== Results ==
=== Standings ===
Pos	Team	Pld	W	SOW	SOL	L	GF	GA	GD	Pts	Qualification or relegation
1st place, gold medalist(s)	Netherlands (Note: Belgium and the Netherlands are already qualified for the 2026 FIH World Cup as hosts.) (C)	16	13	1	1	1	69	22	+47	42	
2nd place, silver medalist(s)	Argentina (Q)	16	9	3	1	3	36	20	+16	34	Qualified for the 2026 FIH World Cup
3rd place, bronze medalist(s)	Belgium	16	9	1	3	3	42	23	+19	32	
4	China	16	8	1	2	5	34	28	+6	28	
5	Australia	16	6	1	0	9	29	40	−11	20	
6	Spain	16	6	1	0	9	22	49	−27	20	
7	Germany (Note: Germany is already qualified for the 2026 FIH World Cup as the highest placed nation of the 2023–24 FIH Pro League.)	16	4	1	2	9	30	35	−5	16	
8	England	16	4	1	0	11	20	44	−24	14	
9	India (R)	16	2	1	2	11	22	43	−21	10	Relegated to 2025–26 FIH Nations Cup

Source: FIH
Rules for classification: 1) points; 2) matches won; 3) goal difference; 4) goals for; 5) head-to-head result; 6) field goals scored.
(C) Champion; (Q) Qualified to the phase indicated; (R) Relegated

=== Fixtures ===
All times are local.

30 November 2024
19:30

China	2–2	Belgium
Xu Weny. 20'; Zou 32'	Report	Struijk 50'; Englebert 58'
Penalties
Li H. (penalty shoot-out scored); Zhang Y. (penalty shoot-out scored); Fan (penalty shoot-out scored); Dan (penalty shoot-out scored)	4–1	(penalty shoot-out scored) Rasir; (penalty shoot-out missed) D. Marien; (penalty shoot-out missed) Blockmans

Gongshu Canal Sports Park Stadium, Hangzhou
Umpires:
Lim Hong-Zhen (SGP)
Cookie Tan (SGP)

1 December 2024
19:30

China	2–1	England
Zhang W. 9'; Yu 39'	Report	Manton 1'

Gongshu Canal Sports Park Stadium, Hangzhou
Umpires:
Deepak Joshi (IND)
Rama Potnis (IND)

2 December 2024
19:30

Belgium	1–3	England
Blockmans 41'	Report	Bingham 2', 32'; Bourne 58'

Gongshu Canal Sports Park Stadium, Hangzhou
Umpires:
Lim Hong-Zhen (SGP)
Rama Potnis (IND)

3 December 2024
19:30

China	1–2	Belgium
Liu C. 57'	Report	Schreurs 39'; Blockmans 46'

Gongshu Canal Sports Park Stadium, Hangzhou
Umpires:
Deepak Joshi (IND)
Cookie Tan (SGP)

4 December 2024
19:30

China	4–0	England
Chen Ya. 17'; Zhang Y. 24'; He 28'; Chen Yu. 55'	Report

Gongshu Canal Sports Park Stadium, Hangzhou
Umpires:
Lim Hong-Zhen (SGP)
Deepak Joshi (IND)

5 December 2024
19:30

England	2–8	Belgium
Crowson 15'; Giglio 25'	Report	Blockmans 29'; Rasir 32'; Vanden Borre 41', 58'; Bonami 45+'; Moors 52'; Englebert 57', 59'

Gongshu Canal Sports Park Stadium, Hangzhou
Umpires:
Cookie Tan (SGP)
Rama Potnis (IND)

10 December 2024
19:00

Argentina	2–2	Germany
Larsen 8'; Jankunas 47'	Report	Krings 37'; Strauss 58'
Penalties
Díaz (penalty shoot-out missed); Jankunas (penalty shoot-out scored); Cairó (penalty shoot-out scored); Pisthón (penalty shoot-out missed); Alonso (penalty shoot-out scored)	3–2	(penalty shoot-out missed) Stoffelsma; (penalty shoot-out scored) Schwabe; (penalty shoot-out scored) Strauss; (penalty shoot-out missed) Weidemann; (penalty shoot-out missed) Nolte

Polideportivo Provincial, Santiago del Estero
Umpires:
Victoria Pazos (PAR)
Pauline Cuypers (BEL)

11 December 2024
19:00

Germany	1–6	Netherlands
Nolte 52'	Report	Moes 17', 54'; Matla 30', 50'; Y. Jansen 41', 49'

Polideportivo Provincial, Santiago del Estero
Umpires:
Jonathan Altamirano (MEX)
Victoria Pazos (PAR)

12 December 2024
19:00

Argentina	2–3	Netherlands
Bruggesser 26'; Gorzelany 45'	Report	Fokke 13'; Y. Jansen 20'; Van der Elst 44'

Polideportivo Provincial, Santiago del Estero
Umpires:
Pauline Cuypers (BEL)
Benjamin Peters (USA)

13 December 2024
19:00

Argentina	1–1	Germany
Bruggesser 28'	Report	Schwabe 1'
Penalties
Díaz (penalty shoot-out scored); Jankunas (penalty shoot-out scored); Bruggesser (penalty shoot-out scored); Cairó (penalty shoot-out scored); Alonso (penalty shoot-out missed)	4–5	(penalty shoot-out scored) Frerichs; (penalty shoot-out scored) Schwabe; (penalty shoot-out scored) Strauss; (penalty shoot-out scored) Nolte; (penalty shoot-out scored) Kurz

Polideportivo Provincial, Santiago del Estero
Umpires:
Tyler Klenk (CAN)
Jonathan Altamirano (MEX)

14 December 2024
19:00

Netherlands	4–1	Germany
Matla 21'; Y. Jansen 47'; Moes 53', 57'	Report	Kurz 25'

Polideportivo Provincial, Santiago del Estero
Umpires:
Victoria Pazos (PAR)
Pauline Cuypers (BEL)

15 December 2024
19:00

Argentina	3–2	Netherlands
Díaz 5'; Castellaro 52'; Granatto 58'	Report	Van der Elst 15'; Winter 53'

Polideportivo Provincial, Santiago del Estero
Umpires:
Victoria Pazos (PAR)
Pauline Cuypers (BEL)

4 February 2025
19:30

China	2–2	Spain
Dan 33'; Ou 43'	Report	F. Amundson 35'; Giné 59'
Penalties
Zou (penalty shoot-out missed); Li H. (penalty shoot-out scored); Fan (penalty shoot-out scored); Dan (penalty shoot-out missed); He (penalty shoot-out missed)	2–3	(penalty shoot-out scored) Segú; (penalty shoot-out missed) Agulló; (penalty shoot-out scored) Giné; (penalty shoot-out missed) P. Jiménez; (penalty shoot-out scored) L. Jiménez

Sydney Olympic Park, Sydney
Umpires:
Amber Church (NZL)
Minami Inamoto (JPN)

5 February 2025
19:30

Australia	4–1	Spain
J. Smith 8'; Squibb 35'; Schonell 40'; Williams 59'	Report	Álvarez 24'

Sydney Olympic Park, Sydney
Umpires:
Liu Xiaoying (CHN)
Katrina Turner (NZL)

6 February 2025
19:30

Australia	2–2	China
Colwill 15'; Schonell 16'	Report	Tan J. 28', 56'
Penalties
Hayes (penalty shoot-out missed); Wilson (penalty shoot-out missed); Young (penalty shoot-out scored); Schonell (penalty shoot-out scored)	2–1	(penalty shoot-out missed) Ou; (penalty shoot-out scored) Liu C. (penalty shoot-out missed) Li H. (penalty shoot-out missed) Zou; (penalty shoot-out missed) Chen Yi

Sydney Olympic Park, Sydney
Umpires:
Amber Church (NZL)
You Hyo-sik (KOR)

7 February 2025
19:30

Spain	2–3	China
Álvarez 3'; Mejías 45'	Report	Tan J. 6', 59'; Ou 57'

Sydney Olympic Park, Sydney
Umpires:
David Tomlinson (NZL)
Minami Inamoto (JPN)

8 February 2025
19:30

Australia	3–1	Spain
J. Smith 10'; Hayes 40'; Young 49'	Report	Rogoski 14'

Sydney Olympic Park, Sydney
Umpires:
Minami Imamoto (JPN)
Katrina Turner (NZL)

9 February 2025
19:30

Australia	1–3	China
Squibb 21'	Report	Yu 15'; Hao 17'; Li H. 20'

Sydney Olympic Park, Sydney
Umpires:
Amber Church (NZL)
Katrina Turner (NZL)

15 February 2025
15:00

Germany	1–2	Spain
Schwabe 44'	Report	Petchamé 35'; Agulló 59'

Kalinga Stadium, Bhubaneswar
Umpires:
Bevan Nichol (NZL)
Tamara Leonard (AUS)

15 February 2025
17:15

India	3–2	England
Vaishnavi 6'; Deepika 25'; Navneet 59'	Report	Bourne 12'; Crackles 58'

Kalinga Stadium, Bhubaneswar
Umpires:
Rawi Anbananthan (MAS)
Wanri Venter (RSA)

16 February 2025
15:00

Spain	2–1	Germany
Rogoski 5'; Molina 38'	Report	Kresken 12'

Kalinga Stadium, Bhubaneswar
Umpires:
Junko Wagatsuma (JPN)
Ahmed El-Sayed (EGY)

16 February 2025
17:15

India	2–2	England
Navneet 53'; Rutuja 57'	Report	Gillott 40'; Howard 56'
Penalties
Navneet (penalty shoot-out scored); Salima (penalty shoot-out missed); Sunelita (penalty shoot-out missed); Lalremsiami (penalty shoot-out missed); Neha (penalty shoot-out missed); Navneet (penalty shoot-out missed); Lalremsiami (penalty shoot-out missed)	1–2	(penalty shoot-out missed) Howard; (penalty shoot-out missed) Bourne; (penalty shoot-out missed) S. Hamilton; (penalty shoot-out missed) Crackles; (penalty shoot-out scored) Walker; (penalty shoot-out missed) Howard; (penalty shoot-out scored) S. Hamilton

Kalinga Stadium, Bhubaneswar
Umpires:
Annelize Rostron (RSA)
Tamara Leonard (AUS)

18 February 2025
17:15

India	3–4	Spain
Baljeet 19'; Sakshi 38'; Rutuja 45'	Report	Rogoski 21'; Petchamé 25', 49'; L. Jiménez 52'

Kalinga Stadium, Bhubaneswar
Umpires:
Timothy Sheahan (AUS)
Junko Wagatsuma (JPN)

19 February 2025
19:30

India	0–1	Spain
	Report	Segú 49'

Kalinga Stadium, Bhubaneswar
Umpires:
Tamara Leonard (AUS)
Ahmed El-Sayed (EGY)

19 February 2025
21:30

Argentina	2–3	Belgium
Gorzelany 10', 24'	Report	Vanden Borre 27', 40'; Gerniers 33'

Polideportivo Provincial, Santiago del Estero
Umpires:
Sophie Bockelmann (GER)
Maggie Giddens (USA)

20 February 2025
21:30

Argentina	2–1	Australia
Bruggesser 7'; Gorzelany 14'	Report	J. Smith 48'

Polideportivo Provincial, Santiago del Estero
Umpires:
Sophie Bockelmann (GER)
Raphaël Adrien (GER)

21 February 2025
15:30

England	1–5	Netherlands
O. Hamilton 57'	Report	Burg 27'; P. Dicke 33'; Fokke 37'; Matla 38'; Van der Elst 50'

Kalinga Stadium, Bhubaneswar
Umpires:
Tamara Leonard (AUS)
Timothy Sheahan (AUS)

21 February 2025
17:15

India	0–4	Germany
	Report	Wortmann 3'; Schwabe 18', 47'; Hachenberg 59'

Kalinga Stadium, Bhubaneswar
Umpires:
Junko Wagatsuma (JPN)
Bevan Nichol (NZL)

21 February 2025
21:30

Australia	1–2	Belgium
Williams 55'	Report	Ballenghien 16', 43'

Polideportivo Provincial, Santiago del Estero
Umpires:
Maggie Giddens (USA)
Darren Hubach (RSA)

22 February 2025
15:30

Netherlands	6–0	England
Veen 2'; Burg 35'; Van der Elst 39'; Albers 45'; Matla 50'; E. Jansen 54'	Report

Kalinga Stadium, Bhubaneswar
Umpires:
Junko Wagatsuma (JPN)
Ahmed El-Sayed (EGY)

22 February 2025
17:15

India	1–0	Germany
Deepika 12'	Report

Kalinga Stadium, Bhubaneswar
Umpires:
Tamara Leonard (AUS)
Wanri Venter (RSA)

22 February 2025
21:30

Argentina	0–0	Belgium
	Report
Penalties
Díaz (penalty shoot-out missed); Bruggesser (penalty shoot-out missed); Gorzelany (penalty shoot-out scored); Albertario (penalty shoot-out scored)	2–0	(penalty shoot-out missed) Dewaet; (penalty shoot-out missed) Ballenghien; (penalty shoot-out missed) D. Marien; (penalty shoot-out missed) Englebert

Polideportivo Provincial, Santiago del Estero
Umpires:
Maggie Giddens (USA)
Sean Edwards (ENG)

23 February 2025
21:30

Argentina	2–1	Australia
Gorzelany 6'; Bruggesser 22'	Report	J. Smith 5'

Polideportivo Provincial, Santiago del Estero
Umpires:
Sophie Bockelmann (GER)
Maggie Giddens (USA)

24 February 2025
17:15

India	2–4	Netherlands
Udita 18', 42'	Report	Reijnen 7'; Albers 34', 47'; Van der Elst 40'

Kalinga Stadium, Bhubaneswar
Umpires:
Ahmed El-Sayed (EGY)
Tamara Leonard (AUS)

24 February 2025
21:30

Belgium	3–2	Australia
Ballenghien 1'; Gerniers 24'; Vanden Borre 28'	Report	Williams 43'; Schonell 56'

Polideportivo Provincial, Santiago del Estero
Umpires:
Sophie Bockelmann (GER)
Raphaël Adrien (GER)

25 February 2025
17:15

India	2–2	Netherlands
Deepika 35'; Baljeet 43'	Report	Sanders 17'; Van der Elst 28'
Penalties
Deepika (penalty shoot-out scored); Dungdung (penalty shoot-out missed); Khan (penalty shoot-out scored); Baljeet (penalty shoot-out missed)	2–1	(penalty shoot-out missed) Sanders; (penalty shoot-out scored) Veen; (penalty shoot-out missed) Van der Elst; (penalty shoot-out missed) Fokke; (penalty shoot-out missed) Dicke

Kalinga Stadium, Bhubaneswar
Umpires:
Annelize Rostron (RSA)
Junko Wagatsuma (JPN)

7 June 2025
11:00

Spain	0–6	Argentina
	Report	Díaz 4'; Bruggesser 24'; Gorzelany 26', 58'; V. Granatto 29'; Pisthón 50'

Estadio Betero, Valencia
Umpires:
Rebecca Edwards (ENG)
Daniël Veerman (NED)

7 June 2025
13:30

Netherlands	8–1	Australia
Y. Jansen 2', 43', 47'; Sanders 3'; Veen 45'; Burg 46'; Matla 54'; Fokke 58'	Report	Williams 31'

Wagener Stadium, Amsterdam
Umpires:
Magali Sergeant (BEL)
Michael Dutrieux (BEL)

8 June 2025
11:00

Spain	0–2	Argentina
	Report	Falasco 29'; Bruggesser 32'

Estadio Betero, Valencia
Umpires:
Jonas van't Hek (NED)
Pauline Cuypers (BEL)

8 June 2025
13:30

Netherlands	5–1	Australia
Veen 13'; Van den Heuvel 21'; Y. Jansen 30', 42'; Albers 48'	Report	Arnott 7'

Wagener Stadium, Amsterdam
Umpires:
Ivona Makar (CRO)
Sébastien Michielsen (BEL)

11 June 2025
17:30

Netherlands	3–2	Spain
Y. Jansen 9', 51'; De Waard 10'	Report	Petchamé 21'; Giné 52'

Wagener Stadium, Amsterdam
Umpires:
Michael Dutrieux (BEL)
Łukasz Zwierzchowski (POL)

12 June 2025
17:30

Netherlands	11–2	Spain
Van der Elst 2'; Y. Jansen 5', 17', 30', 31', 42'; Veen 21'; Matla 23'; Fokke 25', 59'; P. Dicke 49'	Report	Álvarez 19'; L. Barrios 21'

Wagener Stadium, Amsterdam
Umpires:
Łukasz Zwierzchowski (POL)
Ben Göntgen (GER)

14 June 2025
11:00

Australia	3–2	India
Schonell 16'; Pickering 22'; T. Stewart 35'	Report	Deepika 44'; Neha 52'

Lee Valley Hockey and Tennis Centre, London
Umpires:
Rebecca Edwards (ENG)
Gemma Calderón (ESP)

14 June 2025
13:00

Belgium	4–2	Germany
Vanden Borre 8', 13'; Struijk 48'; Schreurs 52'	Report	Nolte 2'; Hachenberg 13'

Wilrijkse Plein, Antwerp
Umpires:
Paul Walker (ENG)
Lorijn de Kraker (NED)

14 June 2025
13:30

Netherlands	3–1	China
Moes 29'; Van der Elst 35'; Y. Jansen 35'	Report	Tan J. 54'

Wagener Stadium, Amsterdam
Umpires:
Ivona Makar (CRO)
Sébastien Michielsen (BEL)

14 June 2025
15:30

England	1–3	Argentina
Curtis 12'	Report	Gorzelany 9', 19'; Jankunas 59'

Lee Valley Hockey and Tennis Centre, London
Umpires:
Kamilė Mockaitytė (LTU)
Raphaël Adrien (GER)

15 June 2025
10:30

India	1–2	Australia
Vaishnavi 3'	Report	Lawton 37'; Pickering 60'

Lee Valley Hockey and Tennis Centre, London
Umpires:
Rebecca Edwards (ENG)
Clare Barwood (WAL)

15 June 2025
13:00

Belgium	2–2	Germany
Puvrez 15'; Bonami 30'	Report	Nolte 41'; Landshut 50'
Penalties
Verhees (penalty shoot-out scored); Ballenghien (penalty shoot-out missed); Rasir (penalty shoot-out missed); Englebert (penalty shoot-out scored); Breyne (penalty shoot-out missed); Verhees (penalty shoot-out scored)	3–2	(penalty shoot-out scored) Zimmermann; (penalty shoot-out missed) Schwabe; (penalty shoot-out scored) Strauss; (penalty shoot-out missed) Frerichs; (penalty shoot-out missed) Kurz; (penalty shoot-out missed) Strauss

Wilrijkse Plein, Antwerp
Umpires:
Federico Silva (ARG)
Daniël Veerman (NED)

15 June 2025
13:30

Netherlands	3–1	China
Fokke 4'; Matla 13'; Sanders 42'	Report	Zhang Y. 11'

Wagener Stadium, Amsterdam
Umpires:
Ivona Makar (CRO)
Magali Sergeant (BEL)

15 June 2025
15:00

England	0–1	Argentina
	Report	Gorzelany 17'

Lee Valley Hockey and Tennis Centre, London
Umpires:
Gemma Calderón (ESP)
Kamilė Mockaitytė (LTU)

17 June 2025
11:00

England	1–0	Australia
Manton 10'	Report

Lee Valley Hockey and Tennis Centre, London
Umpires:
Irene Presenqui (ARG)
Kamilė Mockaitytė (LTU)

17 June 2025
15:30

Argentina	4–1	India
Falasco 29'; Gorzelany 40', 54', 59'	Report	Deepika 30'

Lee Valley Hockey and Tennis Centre, London
Umpires:
Alison Keogh (IRL)
Clare Barwood (WAL)

17 June 2025
18:00

Belgium	6–0	Spain
Englebert 4'; Vanden Borre 28', 29'; Rasir 29'; Hillewaert 51'; Schreurs 55'	Report

Wilrijkse Plein, Antwerp
Umpires:
Aleisha Neumann (AUS)
Lorijn de Kraker (NED)

18 June 2025
15:30

India	2–2	Argentina
Navneet 50'; Deepika 56'	Report	Gorzelany 27', 37'
Penalties
Deepika (penalty shoot-out missed); Rutuja (penalty shoot-out missed); Lalremsiami (penalty shoot-out missed); Baljeet (penalty shoot-out missed)	0–2	(penalty shoot-out missed) Díaz; (penalty shoot-out scored) Bruggesser; (penalty shoot-out missed) Jankunas; (penalty shoot-out scored) Cairó

Lee Valley Hockey and Tennis Centre, London
Umpires:
Rebecca Edwards (ENG)
Jonathan van Hoesslin (RSA)

18 June 2025
17:45

England	0–3	Australia
	Report	J. Smith 26'; G. Stewart 44'; Hayes 50'

Lee Valley Hockey and Tennis Centre, London
Umpires:
Alison Keogh (IRL)
Irene Presenqui (ARG)

18 June 2025
18:00

Belgium	0–1	Spain
	Report	Álvarez 14'

Wilrijkse Plein, Antwerp
Umpires:
Ahmed El-Sayed (EGY)
Tim Meissner (GER)

21 June 2025
13:00

England	0–1	Spain
	Report	Mejías 51'

Lee Valley Hockey and Tennis Centre, London
Umpires:
Jonathan van Hoesslin (RSA)
Kamilė Mockaitytė (LTU)

21 June 2025
13:00

Belgium	5–1	India
Brasseur 37', 55'; A. Marien 41'; Ballenghien 54'; Englebert 58'	Report	Deepika 6'

Wilrijkse Plein, Antwerp
Umpires:
Harry Collinson (ENG)
Lorijn de Kraker (NED)

21 June 2025
14:00

Argentina	3–1	China
Ortiz 10'; Falasco 18'; Jankunas 58'	Report	Chen Yi 2'

Ernst Reuter Sportfeld, Berlin
Umpires:
Kristy Robertson (AUS)
Ayanna McClean (TTO)

21 June 2025
16:30

Germany	4–0	Australia
Strauss 6'; Hachenberg 32'; Schwabe 35'; Fleschütz 48'	Report

Ernst Reuter Sportfeld, Berlin
Umpires:
Hannah Harrison (ENG)
Emi Yamada (JPN)

22 June 2025
12:00

England	4–1	Spain
Axford 3', 38'; Gardens 43'; Petter 59'	Report	P. Jiménez 14'

Lee Valley Hockey and Tennis Centre, London
Umpires:
Irene Presenqui (ARG)
Clare Barwood (WAL)

22 June 2025
13:00

Belgium	2–0	India
Ballenghien 40'; Hillewaert 43'	Report

Wilrijkse Plein, Antwerp
Umpires:
Ahmed El-Sayed (EGY)
Federico Silva (ARG)

22 June 2025
14:00

Germany	3–4	Australia
Strauss 3'; Wanner 27'; Nolte 27'	Report	Schonell 29'; Hayes 33'; G. Stewart 43'; Pickering 45'

Ernst Reuter Sportfeld, Berlin
Umpires:
Paul van den Asuum (NED)
Emi Yamada (JPN)

22 June 2025
16:30

China	2–1	Argentina
Deng 3'; Ma 25'	Report	Granatto 1'

Ernst Reuter Sportfeld, Berlin
Umpires:
Hannah Harrison (ENG)
Kristy Robertson (AUS)

24 June 2025
17:00

Germany	2–3	China
Hachenberg 10'; Stoffelsma 30'	Report	Huang 25'; Dan 39'; Tan J. 57'

Ernst Reuter Sportfeld, Berlin
Umpires:
Ayanna McClean (TTO)
Emi Yamada (JPN)

25 June 2025
17:00

Germany	2–1	China
Wiedermann 23'; Zimmermann 49'	Report	Zeng 36'

Ernst Reuter Sportfeld, Berlin
Umpires:
Hannah Harrison (ENG)
Kristy Robertson (AUS)

28 June 2025
14:00

China	3–0	India
Chen Ya. 21'; Zhang Y. 26'; Yu 45'	Report

Ernst Reuter Sportfeld, Berlin
Umpires:
Hideki Kinoshita (JPN)
Emi Yamada (JPN)

28 June 2025
15:30

Belgium	0–2	Netherlands
	Report	Jansen 30'; Van der Elst 42'

Wilrijkse Plein, Antwerp
Umpires:
Ben Göntgen (GER)
Ivona Makar (CRO)

28 June 2025
16:30

Germany	0–1	England
	Report	Neal 6'

Ernst Reuter Sportfeld, Berlin
Umpires:
Ayanna McClean (TTO)
Magali Sergeant (BEL)

29 June 2025
14:00

Germany	4–2	England
Kurz 2', 59'; Strauss 39'; Nolte 47'	Report	Axford 9'; Hunt 13'

Ernst Reuter Sportfeld, Berlin
Umpires:
Kristy Robertson (AUS)
Ayanna McClean (TTO)

29 June 2025
15:30

Belgium	2–2	Netherlands
D. Marien 41', 59'	Report	Matla 2'; Y. Jansen 60'
Penalties
Gerniers (penalty shoot-out missed); Hillewaert (penalty shoot-out missed); Schreurs (penalty shoot-out missed); Rasir (penalty shoot-out missed)	0–2	(penalty shoot-out scored) Moes; (penalty shoot-out missed) De Waard; (penalty shoot-out scored) Matla

Wilrijkse Plein, Antwerp
Umpires:
Ole Ingwersen (GER)
Kamilė Mockaitytė (LTU)

29 June 2025
16:30

India	2–3	China
Sunelita 9'; Rutaja 38'	Report	Zhang Y. 19', 30'; Xu W. 53'

Ernst Reuter Sportfeld, Berlin
Umpires:
Magali Sergeant (BEL)
Emi Yamada (JPN)

== Goalscorers ==
There were 304 goals scored in 72 matches, for an average of 4.22 goals per match.

19 goals

- (Netherlands) Yibbi Jansen

15 goals

- (Argentina) Agustina Gorzelany

9 goals

- (Belgium) Stéphanie Vanden Borre
- (Netherlands) Fay van der Elst
- (Netherlands) Frédérique Matla

7 goals

- (India) Deepika Sehrawat

6 goals

- (Argentina) Brisa Bruggesser
- (China) Tan Jinzhuang
- (Netherlands) Luna Fokke

5 goals

- (Australia) Courtney Schonell
- (Australia) Jade Smith
- (Belgium) Ambre Ballenghien
- (Belgium) Charlotte Englebert
- (China) Zhang Ying
- (Germany) Lisa Nolte
- (Germany) Sophia Schwabe
- (Netherlands) Freeke Moes

4 goals

- (Australia) Mariah Williams
- (Germany) Johanna Hachenberg
- (Germany) Sara Strauss
- (Netherlands) Felice Albers
- (Netherlands) Marijn Veen
- (Spain) Patricia Álvarez
- (Spain) Estel Petchamé

3 goals

- (Argentina) Victoria Falasco
- (Argentina) Julieta Jankunas
- (Australia) Greta Hayes
- (Australia) Lexie Pickering
- (Belgium) Vanessa Blockmans
- (Belgium) Noa Schreurs
- (China) Yu Anhui
- (England) Madeleine Axford
- (Germany) Stine Kurz
- (India) Navneet Kaur
- (India) Rutuja Pisal
- (Netherlands) Joosje Burg
- (Netherlands) Pien Sanders
- (Spain) Sofía Rogoski

2 goals

- (Argentina) Zoe Díaz
- (Argentina) María Granatto
- (Australia) Penny Squibb
- (Australia) Grace Stewart
- (Belgium) Astrid Bonami
- (Belgium) Hélène Brasseur
- (Belgium) Alix Gerniers
- (Belgium) Lien Hillewaert
- (Belgium) Delphine Marien
- (Belgium) Justine Rasir
- (Belgium) Michelle Struijk
- (China) Chen Yang
- (China) Dan Wen
- (China) Ou Zixia
- (China) Xu Wenyu
- (England) Charlotte Bingham
- (England) Darcy Bourne
- (England) Rebecca Manton
- (India) Udita Duhan
- (India) Baljeet Kaur
- (India) Vaishnavi Phalke
- (Netherlands) Pien Dicke
- (Spain) Xantal Giné
- (Spain) Candela Mejías

1 goal

- (Argentina) Juana Castellaro
- (Argentina) Victoria Granatto
- (Argentina) María Larsen
- (Argentina) Paula Ortiz
- (Argentina) Lourdes Pisthón
- (Australia) Alice Arnott
- (Australia) Claire Colwill
- (Australia) Amy Lawton
- (Australia) Tatum Stewart
- (Australia) Grace Young
- (Belgium) Alix Marien
- (Belgium) Lisa Moors
- (Belgium) Emma Puvrez
- (China) Chen Yi
- (China) Chen Yujun
- (China) Deng Qiuchan
- (China) Hao Guoting
- (China) He Jiangxin
- (China) Huang Haiyan
- (China) Li Hong
- (China) Liu Chencheng
- (China) Ma Ning
- (China) Zeng Xueling
- (China) Zhang Wenli
- (China) Zou Meirong
- (England) Fiona Crackles
- (England) Megan Crowson
- (England) Katie Curtis
- (England) Georgina Gardens
- (England) Millie Giglio
- (England) Paige Gillott
- (England) Olivia Hamilton
- (England) Tess Howard
- (England) Holly Hunt
- (England) Lizzie Neal
- (England) Isabelle Petter
- (Germany) Jette Fleschütz
- (Germany) Aina Kresken
- (Germany) Emilia Landshut
- (Germany) Lilly Stoffelsma
- (Germany) Ines Wanner
- (Germany) Felicia Wiedermann
- (Germany) Amelie Wortmann
- (Germany) Sonja Zimmermann
- (India) Neha Goyal
- (India) Sakshi Rana
- (India) Sunelita Toppo
- (Netherlands) Maud van den Heuvel
- (Netherlands) Eline Jansen
- (Netherlands) Emma Reijnen
- (Netherlands) Xan de Waard
- (Netherlands) Mette Winter
- (Spain) Berta Agulló
- (Spain) Florencia Amundson
- (Spain) Laura Barrios
- (Spain) Lucía Jiménez
- (Spain) Paula Jiménez
- (Spain) Luciana Molina
- (Spain) Marta Segú

Source: FIH

== See also ==
- 2024–25 Men's FIH Pro League
