= Alix Marien =

Belgian field hockey player

Personal information
- Born: 18 May 2003 (age 23) Kapellen, Belgium

Sport
- Sport: Field hockey
- Position: Forward
- Club: Dragons
National team
Years	Team	Caps	Goals
2022–2024	Belgium U–21	16	(2)
2024–	Belgium	16	(1)
Medal record
Women's field hockey
Representing Belgium
FIH Pro League
Bronze medal – third place	Season Six
FIH Junior World Cup
Bronze medal – third place	2023 Santiago
EuroHockey U–21 Championship
Silver medal – second place	2022 Ghent

Alix Marien (born 18 May 2003) is a field hockey player from Belgium.

== Personal life ==
Alix Marien grew up in Kapellen, a municipality in the Antwerp Province of Belgium. She has two older sisters, Delphine and Ophélie, who also play field hockey.

She attended Old Dominion University in the United States.

== Field hockey ==
=== Domestic league ===
Marien currently competes in the Carlsberg 0.0 Hockey League, where she plays for KHC Dragons.

=== Under–18 ===
In 2021, Marien made her first international appearances for Belgium with the national U–18 team. She was a member of the squad that finished fourth at the EuroHockey U–18 Championship in Valencia.

=== Under–21 ===
Following her U–18 debut in 2021, Marien received her first call-up to the Belgian U–21 squad the following year. She was named in the squad and represented the side at the 2022 EuroHockey U–21 Championship in Ghent, where she won a silver medal.

In 2023, she was a member of the history making squad that won a bronze medal at the FIH Junior World Cup in Santiago, defeating England 7–0 in the bronze medal match.

She made her final appearances for the national U–21 team in 2024, representing the team at the EuroHockey U–21 Championship in Terrassa.

=== Senior national team ===
Marien made her senior international debut for the Red Panthers in 2024. She earned her first senior international cap during the Europe leg of season five of the FIH Pro League, in a match against the United States. After missing the Summer Olympics, she was called back into the squad later that year for the Hangzhou leg of the sixth season of the FIH Pro League.

Throughout 2025, Marien continued representing Belgium through the FIH Pro League, helping the squad to a bronze medal finish.

== International goals ==
The following table lists all goals scored by Marien at international level.

Goal	Date	Location	Opponent	Score	Result	Event	Ref
1	21 June 2025	Wilrijkse Plein, Antwerp, Belgium	India	2–1	5–1	2024–25 FIH Pro League	
