= 2022 Women's EuroHockey Junior Championship =

Tournament details
- Host country: Belgium
- City: Ghent
- Dates: 24–30 July
- Teams: 8 (from 1 confederation)
- Venue: La Gantoise HC

Final positions
- Champions: Germany (9th title)
- Runner-up: Belgium
- Third place: Netherlands

Tournament statistics
- Matches played: 20
- Goals scored: 85 (4.25 per match)
- Top scorer(s): (Belgium) Charlotte Englebert (Germany) Lilly Stoffelsma (5 goals)
- Best player: (Belgium) Charlotte Englebert
- Best goalkeeper: (Spain) Clara Pérez

The 2022 Women's EuroHockey Junior Championship was the 20th edition of the Women's EuroHockey Junior Championship, the biennial international women's under-21 field hockey championship of Europe organised by the European Hockey Federation. The top five teams will qualify for the 2023 Women's FIH Hockey Junior World Cup.

It was held alongside the men's tournament in Ghent, Belgium from 24 to 30 July 2022. The tournament was originally scheduled to be held in Wavre but a venue change was required due to the initial venue not being ready in time due to flooding.

Spain were the defending champions but were eliminated in the group stage. Germany won their ninth title by defeating the hosts Belgium 4–3 in a shoot-out after the match finished 1–1. The Netherlands won the bronze medal by defeating England 2–1.

== Qualified teams ==
Participating nations qualified based on their final ranking from the 2019 competition.

Dates	Event	Location	Quotas	Qualifiers
13–21 July 2019	2019 EuroHockey Junior Championship	Valencia, Spain	6	Belgium; England; Germany; Ireland; Netherlands; ~~Russia~~ (Note: Russia was excluded due to the 2022 Russian invasion of Ukraine); Spain
14–20 July 2019	2019 EuroHockey Junior Championship II	Alanya, Turkey	2	Scotland; Wales
Total			8	

== Preliminary round ==
=== Pool A ===
Pos	Team	Pld	W	D	L	GF	GA	GD	Pts	Qualification
1	Belgium (H)	3	2	1	0	12	1	+11	7	Semi-finals
2	Netherlands	3	1	2	0	13	2	+11	5	Semi-finals
3	Spain	3	1	1	1	7	2	+5	4	Pool C
4	Wales	3	0	0	3	0	27	−27	0	Pool C

Source: FIH
Rules for classification: 1) points; 2) matches won; 3) goal difference; 4) goals for; 5) head-to-head result; 6) field goals for.
(H) Hosts

24 July 2022
15:30

Netherlands	1–1	Belgium
De Wit 4'	Report	Schreurs 42'

Umpires:
Lena McCrae (SCO)
Alia Korth (GER)

24 July 2022
17:45

Spain	6–0	Wales
Serrahima 13'; Torrent 22'; Fernández 24'; Insenser 41'; Ballesteros 52'; Gestí 54'	Report

Umpires:
Zoe Hall (ENG)
Amy Jones (IRE)

25 July 2022
16:30

Spain	1–1	Netherlands
Gestí 49'	Report	Kroot 59'

Umpires:
Shane O'Donnell (IRL)
Alia Korth (GER)

25 July 2022
18:45

Belgium	10–0	Wales
Roels 3'; Englebert 7', 14', 59'; A. Marien 17'; Blockmans 29', 47'; White 32'; Schreurs 55'; Mommens 60'	Report

Umpires:
Anatole Platel (FRA)
Lorijn de Kraker (NED)

27 July 2022
17:45

Belgium	1–0	Spain
Bonami 58'	Report

Umpires:
Ilaria Amorosini (ITA)
Lena McRae (SCO)

27 July 2022
17:45

Netherlands	11–0	Wales
Winter 20', 29', 36'; De Wit 25'; Admiraal 25', 30'; Steensma 31', 42', 45'; Van den Broek 47'; Fokke 60'	Report

Umpires:
Michael Dutrieux (BEL)
Alia Korth (GER)

=== Pool B ===
Pos	Team	Pld	W	D	L	GF	GA	GD	Pts	Qualification
1	Germany	3	3	0	0	15	1	+14	9	Semi-finals
2	England	3	2	0	1	12	3	+9	6	Semi-finals
3	Ireland	3	0	1	2	3	14	−11	1	Pool C
4	Scotland	3	0	1	2	2	14	−12	1	Pool C

Source: FIH
Rules for classification: 1) points; 2) matches won; 3) goal difference; 4) goals for; 5) head-to-head result; 6) field goals for.

24 July 2022
11:00

England	5–1	Ireland
Swain 23', 42'; Axford 29'; McCabe 37'; Mackenzie 46'	Report	Murdoch 29'

Umpires:
Oliver Tarnoczi (AUT)
Lorijn de Kraker (NED)

24 July 2022
13:15

Germany	6–0	Scotland
Nolte 19'; Frerichs 28'; Sippel 32'; Stoffelsma 38', 50'; Mandel 41'	Report

Umpires:
Pauline Cuypers (BEL)
Toni-Lee Lambert (WAL)

26 July 2022
12:00

Ireland	2–2	Scotland
Paul 15'; Murdoch 18'	Report	Williamson 11'; Nyirenda 51'

Umpires:
Anatole Platel (FRA)
Toni-Lee Lambert (WAL)

26 July 2022
14:15

Germany	2–1	England
Stoffelsma 6'; Sippel 58'	Report	Le Huray 51'

Umpires:
Sandra Adell (ESP)
Jamie Telfer (SCO)

27 July 2022
13:15

Ireland	0–7	Germany
	Report	Strauss 10', 52'; Frerichs 17', 49'; Stoffelsma 24', 55'; Mandel 47'

Umpires:
Zoe Hall (ENG)
Lorijn de Kraker (NED)

27 July 2022
13:15

England	6–0	Scotland
Taylor 3'; Axford 4'; McCabe 12', 50'; Long 16'; Le Huray 58'	Report

Umpires:
Amy Jones (IRL)
Oliver Tarnoczi (AUT)

== Fifth to eighth place classification ==
The points obtained in the preliminary round against the other team are taken over.

=== Pool C ===
Pos	Team	Pld	W	D	L	GF	GA	GD	Pts	Qualification or relegation
5	Spain	3	2	1	0	12	1	+11	7	Qualification for the 2023 Junior World Cup
6	Ireland	3	1	2	0	4	3	+1	5	
7	Wales (R)	3	1	0	2	2	8	−6	3	Relegation to the Junior Championship II
8	Scotland (R)	3	0	1	2	3	9	−6	1	Relegation to the Junior Championship II

Source: FIH
Rules for classification: 1) points; 2) matches won; 3) goal difference; 4) goals for; 5) head-to-head result; 6) field goals for.
(R) Relegated

29 July 2022
10:00

Wales	1–0	Scotland
Collier 24'	Report

Umpires:
Amy Jones (IRL)
Zoe Hall (ENG)

29 July 2022
12:15

Spain	0–0	Ireland
	Report

Umpires:
Toni-Lee Lambert (WAL)
Lena McCrae (SCO)

30 July 2022
09:00

Spain	6–1	Scotland
Torrent 4', 14'; B. Pérez 25'; Ballesteros 48'; Vizcaino 52'; Barba 59'	Report	Williamson 9'

Umpires:
Amy Jones (IRL)
Zoe Hall (ENG)

30 July 2022
09:00

Ireland	2–1	Wales
Byrne 50'; Reid 52'	Report	Bowen 44'

Umpires:
Steven Bakker (NED)
Lena McCrae (SCO)

== First to fourth place classification ==
=== Bracket ===
Semi-finals
29 July
Belgium	2
England	1
29 July
Germany (s.o.)	1 (3)
Netherlands	1 (2)

Final
30 July
Belgium	1 (3)
Germany (s.o.)	1 (4)
Third place
30 July
England	1
Netherlands	2

=== Semi-finals ===
29 July 2022
10:00

Germany	1–1	Netherlands
Frerichs 1'	Report	De Nooijer 14'
Penalties
Stoffelsma (penalty shoot-out scored); Frerichs (penalty shoot-out missed); Strauss (penalty shoot-out scored); Wiedermann (penalty shoot-out missed); Nolte (penalty shoot-out scored)	3–2	(penalty shoot-out scored) Admiraal; (penalty shoot-out scored) De Wit; (penalty shoot-out missed) Steensma; (penalty shoot-out missed) Kroot; (penalty shoot-out missed) Winter

Umpires:
Pauline Cuypers (BEL)
Ilaria Amorosini (ITA)

29 July 2022
12:15

Belgium	2–1	England
Englebert 27'; Roels 48'	Report	Manton 35'

Umpires:
Sandra Adell (ESP)
Lorijn de Kraker (NED)

=== Third place match ===
30 July 2022
11:15

England	1–2	Netherlands
Swain 3'	Report	Fokke 11'; Winter 43'

Umpires:
Alia Korth (GER)
Ilaria Amorosini (ITA)

=== Final ===
30 July 2022
15:45

Belgium	1–1	Germany
Englebert 25'	Report	Wiedermann 2'
Penalties
Vanden Borre (penalty shoot-out scored); Englebert (penalty shoot-out scored); Blockmans (penalty shoot-out missed); D. Marien (penalty shoot-out scored); Roels (penalty shoot-out missed)	3–4	(penalty shoot-out scored) Stoffelsma; (penalty shoot-out scored) Schwabe; (penalty shoot-out scored) Strauss; (penalty shoot-out scored) Wiedermann

Umpires:
Sandra Adell (ESP)
Lorijn de Kraker (NED)

== Final standings ==
Pos	Team	Qualification or relegation
1	Germany	Qualification for the 2023 Junior World Cup
2	Belgium (H)	Qualification for the 2023 Junior World Cup
3	Netherlands	Qualification for the 2023 Junior World Cup
4	England	Qualification for the 2023 Junior World Cup
5	Spain	Qualification for the 2023 Junior World Cup
6	Ireland	
7	Wales (R)	Relegation to the Junior Championship II
8	Scotland (R)	Relegation to the Junior Championship II

Source: FIH
(H) Host; (R) Relegated

== Goalscorers ==
There were 85 goals scored in 20 matches, for an average of 4.25 goals per match.

5 goals

- (Belgium) Charlotte Englebert
- (Germany) Lilly Stoffelsma

4 goals

- (Germany) Lena Frerichs
- (Netherlands) Mette Winter

3 goals

- (England) Victoria McCabe
- (England) Claudia Swain
- (Netherlands) Maria Steensma
- (Spain) María Torrent

2 goals

- (Belgium) Vanessa Blockmans
- (Belgium) Anne-Sophie Roels
- (Belgium) Noa Schreurs
- (England) Madeleine Axford
- (England) Martha le Huray
- (Germany) Yara Mandel
- (Germany) Carlotta Sippel
- (Germany) Sara Strauss
- (Ireland) Siofra Murdoch
- (Netherlands) Zoe Admiraal
- (Netherlands) Luna Fokke
- (Netherlands) Teuntje de Wit
- (Scotland) Lucy Williamson
- (Spain) Ainhoa Ballesteros
- (Spain) María Gestí

1 goal

- (Belgium) Astrid Bonami
- (Belgium) Alix Marien
- (Belgium) Elizabeth Mommens
- (Belgium) Emily White
- (England) Madeleine Long
- (England) Lorna Mackenzie
- (England) Rebecca Manton
- (England) Martha Taylor
- (Germany) Lisa Nolte
- (Germany) Felicia Wiedermann
- (Ireland) Caoimhe Byrne
- (Ireland) Emma Paul
- (Ireland) Cathrine Reid
- (Netherlands) Belén van der Broek
- (Netherlands) Isa Kroot
- (Netherlands) Lilli de Nooijer
- (Spain) Clara Barba
- (Spain) Paula Fernández
- (Spain) Laia Insenser
- (Spain) Blanca Pérez
- (Spain) Berta Serrahima
- (Spain) Meritxell Vizcaino
- (Scotland) Lunjika Nyirenda
- (Wales) Eve Bowen
- (Wales) Bethan Collier

Source: FIH

== See also ==
- 2022 Men's EuroHockey Junior Championship
- 2022 Women's EuroHockey Junior Championship II
