= 2023–24 Women's FIH Pro League =

- Dates: 6 December 2023 – 29 June 2024
- Teams: 9 (from 4 confederations)

Final positions
- Champions: Netherlands (4th title)
- Runner-up: Germany
- Third place: Argentina

Tournament statistics
- Matches played: 72
- Goals scored: 277 (3.85 per match)
- Top scorer: (Netherlands) Yibbi Jansen (19 goals)

The 2023–24 Women's FIH Pro League was the fifth edition of the Women's FIH Pro League, a field hockey championship for women's national teams. The tournament began on 6 December 2023 and finished on 29 June 2024.

The Netherlands won the tournament for the fourth time.

== Format ==
The home and away principle was kept for the season, which was divided into date blocks. To assist with competition planning, international and national, several teams gathered in one venue to contest “mini-tournaments," wherein they each played two matches against one another.

If one of the two matches played between two teams was cancelled, the winner of the other match received double points.

This season winner earned direct qualification for the 2026 World Cup. As the Netherlands were already qualified as host, Germany secured their participation.

== Teams ==
Following the announcement of New Zealand's withdrawal for this current season, the United States rejoined despite relegation earned in the previous season.

- Argentina
- Australia
- Belgium
- China
- Germany
- Great Britain
- India
- Netherlands
- United States

== Results ==
=== Standings ===
| Pos | Team | Pld | W | SOW | SOL | L | GF | GA | GD | Pts | Qualification or relegation |
|---|---|---|---|---|---|---|---|---|---|---|---|
| 1st place, gold medalist(s) | Netherlands (Note: Belgium and the Netherlands are already qualified for the 2026 FIH World Cup as hosts.) (C) | 16 | 15 | 0 | 0 | 1 | 63 | 13 | +50 | 45 | |
| 2nd place, silver medalist(s) | Germany (Q) | 16 | 11 | 0 | 1 | 4 | 35 | 23 | +12 | 34 | Qualified for the 2026 FIH World Cup |
| 3rd place, bronze medalist(s) | Argentina | 16 | 10 | 2 | 0 | 4 | 40 | 21 | +19 | 34 | |
| 4 | Belgium | 16 | 7 | 2 | 1 | 6 | 24 | 27 | −3 | 26 | |
| 5 | China | 16 | 7 | 0 | 4 | 5 | 31 | 29 | +2 | 25 | |
| 6 | Australia | 16 | 7 | 1 | 1 | 7 | 29 | 29 | 0 | 24 | |
| 7 | Great Britain | 16 | 3 | 3 | 1 | 9 | 24 | 46 | −22 | 16 | |
| 8 | India | 16 | 2 | 1 | 0 | 13 | 16 | 38 | −22 | 8 | |
| 9 | United States (R) | 16 | 1 | 0 | 1 | 14 | 15 | 51 | −36 | 4 | Relegated to 2024–25 FIH Nations Cup |

Source: FIH
Rules for classification: 1) points; 2) matches won; 3) goal difference; 4) goals for; 5) head-to-head result; 6) field goals scored.
(C) Champion; (Q) Qualified to the phase indicated; (R) Relegated

=== Fixtures ===
All times are local.

6 December 2023
19:00

| Argentina | 0–0 | Great Britain |
|---|---|---|
| | Report |
Penalties
| Jankunas (penalty shoot-out missed); Albertarrio (penalty shoot-out scored); Campoy (penalty shoot-out missed); Manuele (penalty shoot-out scored) | 2–1 | (penalty shoot-out missed) Howard; (penalty shoot-out scored) S. Hamilton; (penalty shoot-out missed) Petter; (penalty shoot-out missed) French; (penalty shoot-out missed) K. Robertson |

Polideportivo Provincial, Santiago del Estero
Umpires:
Ayanna McClean (TTO)
Irene Presenqui (ARG)

7 December 2023
19:00

| Great Britain | 0–8 | Netherlands |
|---|---|---|
| | Report | Jansen 4', 14', 36'; Moes 15', 32'; Sanders 23'; Van der Elst 37'; Fokke 44' |

Polideportivo Provincial, Santiago del Estero
Umpires:
Irene Presenqui (ARG)
Jonathan Altamirano (MEX)

8 December 2023
19:00

| Argentina | 1–4 | Netherlands |
|---|---|---|
| Granatto 18' | Report | Drummond 50'; Albers 57'; Burg 59'; Jansen 60' |

Polideportivo Provincial, Santiago del Estero
Umpires:
Gabriel Labate (ARG)
Jonathan Altamirano (MEX)

9 December 2023
19:00

| Argentina | 2–1 | Great Britain |
|---|---|---|
| Gorzelany 25'; Trinchinetti 47' | Report | Howard 34' |

Polideportivo Provincial, Santiago del Estero
Umpires:
Ayanna McClean (TTO)
Irene Presenqui (ARG)

10 December 2023
19:00

| Netherlands | 5–1 | Great Britain |
|---|---|---|
| Matla 10'; Koolen 37'; Burg 47', 48'; Steensma 55' | Report | Petter 47' |

Polideportivo Provincial, Santiago del Estero
Umpires:
Germán Montes de Oca (ARG)
Jonathan Altamirano (MEX)

11 December 2023
19:00

| Argentina | 1–7 | Netherlands |
|---|---|---|
| Gorzelany 58' | Report | Jansen 3'; Moes 7'; Fokke 10'; Matla 39', 49'; Dicke 42'; Sanders 45+' |

Polideportivo Provincial, Santiago del Estero
Umpires:
Ayanna McClean (TTO)
Federico Silva (ARG)

3 February 2024
17:30

| United States | 0–7 | Netherlands |
|---|---|---|
| | Report | Fokke 13'; Dicke 14', 35', 38', 46'; Jansen 56', 58' |

Kalinga Stadium, Bhubaneswar
Umpires:
Liu Xiaoying (CHN)
Kelly Hudson (NZL)

3 February 2024
19:30

| China | 2–1 | India |
|---|---|---|
| Dan 40'; Gu B. 52' | Report | Vandana 15' |

Kalinga Stadium, Bhubaneswar
Umpires:
Zeke Newman (AUS)
James Unkles (AUS)

4 February 2024
17:30

| China | 3–0 | Australia |
|---|---|---|
| Yuan 37', 55'; Yu 39' | Report |

Kalinga Stadium, Bhubaneswar
Umpires:
Raghu Prasad (IND)
Rawi Anbananthan (MAS)

4 February 2024
19:30

| India | 1–3 | Netherlands |
|---|---|---|
| Navneet 9' | Report | Jansen 3', 34'; Van der Elst 21' |

Kalinga Stadium, Bhubaneswar
Umpires:
Kelly Hudson (NZL)
Liu Xiaoying (CHN)

6 February 2024
17:30

| China | 1–3 | Netherlands |
|---|---|---|
| Zhong 19' | Report | Moes 22', 38'; Veen 25' |

Kalinga Stadium, Bhubaneswar
Umpires:
Kelly Hudson (NZL)
Zeke Newman (AUS)

6 February 2024
19:30

| United States | 0–3 | Australia |
|---|---|---|
| | Report | T. Stewart 7'; Kershaw 23'; G. Stewart 37' |

Kalinga Stadium, Bhubaneswar
Umpires:
Liu Xiaoying (CHN)
James Unkles (AUS)

7 February 2024
17:30

| China | 3–1 | United States |
|---|---|---|
| Zou 8'; Dan 26', 47' | Report | Sumfest 58' |

Kalinga Stadium, Bhubaneswar
Umpires:
Raghu Prasad (IND)
Kelly Hudson (NZL)

7 February 2024
19:30

| India | 0–3 | Australia |
|---|---|---|
| | Report | G. Stewart 19'; T. Stewart 23'; Nobbs 55' |

Kalinga Stadium, Bhubaneswar
Umpires:
Liu Xiaoying (CHN)
Rawi Anbananthan (MAS)

9 February 2024
17:30

| Netherlands | 6–2 | Australia |
|---|---|---|
| Veen 7', 49', 49'; Matla 9'; Jansen 20', 39' | Report | T. Stewart 28'; G. Stewart 52' |

Kalinga Stadium, Bhubaneswar
Umpires:
Kelly Hudson (NZL)
Liu Xiaoying (CHN)

9 February 2024
19:30

| India | 3–1 | United States |
|---|---|---|
| Vandana 9'; Deepika 26'; Salima 56' | Report | Caarls 42' |

Kalinga Stadium, Bhubaneswar
Umpires:
James Unkles (AUS)
Rawi Anbananthan (MAS)

12 February 2024
17:30

| Netherlands | 4–0 | United States |
|---|---|---|
| Moes 16'; Van der Elst 21', 56'; Albers 36' | Report |

Birsa Munda International Hockey Stadium, Rourkela
Umpires:
Kelly Robertson (NZL)
David Tomlinson (NZL)

12 February 2024
19:30

| China | 2–1 | India |
|---|---|---|
| Gu B. 14', 53' | Report | Sangita 7' |

Birsa Munda International Hockey Stadium, Rourkela
Umpires:
Aleisha Neumann (AUS)
Martin Madden (SCO)

14 February 2024
17:30

| Australia | 2–0 | China |
|---|---|---|
| G. Stewart 29'; Kershaw 57' | Report |

Birsa Munda International Hockey Stadium, Rourkela
Umpires:
Junko Wagatsuma (JPN)
Martin Madden (SCO)

14 February 2024
19:30

| Netherlands | 1–0 | India |
|---|---|---|
| Albers 27' | Report |

Birsa Munda International Hockey Stadium, Rourkela
Umpires:
Aleisha Neumann (AUS)
David Tomlinson (NZL)

14 February 2024
21:30

| Argentina | 5–0 | Belgium |
|---|---|---|
| Manuele 3'; Di Santo 25'; Albertarrio 40'; Gorzelany 45'; Trinchinetti 47' | Report |

Polideportivo Provincial, Santiago del Estero
Umpires:
Maggie Giddens (USA)
Victoria Pazos (PAR)

15 February 2024
13:30

| Australia | 4–0 | United States |
|---|---|---|
| Arnott 7'; Brooks 21'; Greiner 30'; Colwill 44' | Report |

Birsa Munda International Hockey Stadium, Rourkela
Umpires:
Martin Madden (SCO)
Junko Wagatsuma (JPN)

15 February 2024
15:30

| Netherlands | 4–2 | China |
|---|---|---|
| Burg 8'; Van der Elst 12'; Jansen 34'; Albers 39' | Report | Yu 15'; Gu B. 59' |

Birsa Munda International Hockey Stadium, Rourkela
Umpires:
Aleisha Neumann (AUS)
Kelly Robertson (NZL)

15 February 2024
21:30

| Belgium | 0–3 | Germany |
|---|---|---|
| | Report | Zimmermann 14'; Fleschütz 48'; Stoffelsma 55' |

Polideportivo Provincial, Santiago del Estero
Umpires:
Irene Presenqui (ARG)
Maggie Giddens (USA)

16 February 2024
21:30

| Argentina | 3–1 | Germany |
|---|---|---|
| Campoy 23'; Trinchinetti 33'; Gorzelany 57' | Report | Lorenz 49' |

Polideportivo Provincial, Santiago del Estero
Umpires:
Irene Presenqui (ARG)
Victoria Pazos (PAR)

17 February 2024
17:30

| United States | 0–2 | China |
|---|---|---|
| | Report | Ou 7'; Zhong 19' |

Birsa Munda International Hockey Stadium, Rourkela
Umpires:
Aleisha Neumann (AUS)
Kelly Robertson (NZL)

17 February 2024
19:30

| Australia | 0–1 | India |
|---|---|---|
| | Report | Vandana 34' |

Birsa Munda International Hockey Stadium, Rourkela
Umpires:
David Tomlinson (NZL)
Junko Wagatsuma (JPN)

17 February 2024
21:30

| Argentina | 2–0 | Belgium |
|---|---|---|
| Gorzelany 36'; Toccalino 50' | Report |

Polideportivo Provincial, Santiago del Estero
Umpires:
Maggie Giddens (USA)
Victoria Pazos (PAR)

18 February 2024
17:30

| Australia | 1–3 | Netherlands |
|---|---|---|
| Kershaw 20' | Report | Jansen 2', 13', 14' |

Birsa Munda International Hockey Stadium, Rourkela
Umpires:
Martin Madden (SCO)
David Tomlinson (NZL)

18 February 2024
19:30

| United States | 1–1 | India |
|---|---|---|
| Sessa 45' | Report | Deepika 19' |
Penalties
| Crouse (penalty shoot-out scored); Sessa (penalty shoot-out missed); Tamer (penalty shoot-out missed); Zimmer (penalty shoot-out missed); Caarls (penalty shoot-out missed) | 1–2 | (penalty shoot-out missed) Deepika; (penalty shoot-out scored) Mumtaz; (penalty shoot-out scored) Sonika; (penalty shoot-out missed) Lalremsiami |

Birsa Munda International Hockey Stadium, Rourkela
Umpires:
Aleisha Neumann (AUS)
Junko Wagatsuma (JPN)

18 February 2024
21:30

| Germany | 3–1 | Belgium |
|---|---|---|
| Kurz 17'; Fleschütz 32'; Strauss 60' | Report | Leclef 58' |

Polideportivo Provincial, Santiago del Estero
Umpires:
Tyler Klenk (CAN)
Victoria Pazos (PAR)

19 February 2024
21:30

| Argentina | 0–2 | Germany |
|---|---|---|
| | Report | Huse 13'; Heinz 26' |

Polideportivo Provincial, Santiago del Estero
Umpires:
Maggie Giddens (USA)
Benjamin Peters (USA)

22 May 2024
12:15

| India | 0–5 | Argentina |
|---|---|---|
| | Report | Gorzelany 13'; Raposo 24'; Miranda 41'; Jankunas 53', 59' |

Wilrijkse Plein Antwerp, Antwerp
Umpires:
Annelize Rostron (RSA)
Kamilė Mockaitytė (LTU)

22 May 2024
16:45

| Belgium | 5–1 | United States |
|---|---|---|
| Bonami 19', 33', 43'; Raye 35'; Vanden Borre 60' | Report | Tamer 41' |

Wilrijkse Plein Antwerp, Antwerp
Umpires:
Alison Keogh (IRL)
Ole Ingwersen (GER)

23 May 2024
14:15

| United States | 4–5 | Argentina |
|---|---|---|
| Hoffman 9'; Sessa 24'; Yeager 36'; Tamer 54' | Report | Gorzelany 9', 20'; Granatto 21'; Jankunas 42'; Trinchinetti 58' |

Wilrijkse Plein Antwerp, Antwerp
Umpires:
Annelize Rostron (RSA)
Raphaël Adrien (GER)

23 May 2024
18:45

| Belgium | 2–0 | India |
|---|---|---|
| 'T Serstevens 34'; Dewaet 36' | Report |

Wilrijkse Plein Antwerp, Antwerp
Umpires:
Sarah Wilson (SCO)
Kamilė Mockaitytė (LTU)

25 May 2024
11:45

| Argentina | 4–0 | United States |
|---|---|---|
| Gorzelany 9'; Sauze 24'; Jankunas 45', 59' | Report |

Wilrijkse Plein Antwerp, Antwerp
Umpires:
Sarah Wilson (SCO)
Alison Keogh (IRL)

25 May 2024
14:00

| India | 1–2 | Belgium |
|---|---|---|
| Sangita 34' | Report | Ballenghien 15'; Blockmans 20' |

Wilrijkse Plein Antwerp, Antwerp
Umpires:
Ole Ingwersen (GER)
Raphaël Adrien (GER)

26 May 2024
11:45

| Argentina | 3–0 | India |
|---|---|---|
| Di Santo 1'; Campoy 39'; Granatto 47' | Report |

Wilrijkse Plein Antwerp, Antwerp
Umpires:
Alison Keogh (IRL)
Kamilė Mockaitytė (LTU)

26 May 2024
14:00

| United States | 1–2 | Belgium |
|---|---|---|
| Gonzales 5' | Report | Raye 8'; Ballenghien 13' |

Wilrijkse Plein Antwerp, Antwerp
Umpires:
Annelize Rostron (RSA)
Ole Ingwersen (GER)

29 May 2024
11:45

| China | 0–3 | Argentina |
|---|---|---|
| | Report | Granatto 14'; Trinchinetti 34', 60' |

Wilrijkse Plein Antwerp, Antwerp
Umpires:
Sarah Wilson (SCO)
Annelize Rostron (RSA)

29 May 2024
16:30

| Belgium | 2–2 | Australia |
|---|---|---|
| Vanden Borre 19'; Gerniers 60' | Report | Claxton 8'; Peris 57' |
Penalties
| Versavel (penalty shoot-out missed); Englebert (penalty shoot-out scored); Blockmans (penalty shoot-out scored); Ballenghien (penalty shoot-out missed); Breyne (penalty shoot-out missed); Englebert (penalty shoot-out scored) | 3–2 | (penalty shoot-out missed) Peris; (penalty shoot-out scored) Kershaw; (penalty shoot-out scored) Malone; (penalty shoot-out missed) Nobbs; (penalty shoot-out missed) Lawton; (penalty shoot-out missed) Peris |

Wilrijkse Plein Antwerp, Antwerp
Umpires:
Alison Keogh (IRL)
Kamilė Mockaitytė (LTU)

30 May 2024
14:15

| Australia | 0–5 | Argentina |
|---|---|---|
| | Report | Antoniazzi 21'; Casas 41'; Granatto 46'; Trinchinetti 50'; Gorzelany 54' |

Wilrijkse Plein Antwerp, Antwerp
Umpires:
Sarah Wilson (SCO)
Ole Ingwersen (GER)

30 May 2024
19:00

| Belgium | 1–1 | China |
|---|---|---|
| Versavel 20' | Report | Zhang Xia. 50' |
Penalties
| Hillewaert (penalty shoot-out missed); Hillewaert (penalty shoot-out scored); Rasir (penalty shoot-out scored); Bonami (penalty shoot-out missed); Dewaet (penalty shoot-out scored); Marien (penalty shoot-out missed); Rasir (penalty shoot-out scored) | 4–3 | (penalty shoot-out scored) Ou; (penalty shoot-out scored) Ma; (penalty shoot-out scored) Zou; (penalty shoot-out missed) Li H. (penalty shoot-out missed) Zhang Xia. (penalty shoot-out missed) Liu C. (penalty shoot-out missed) Li H. |

Wilrijkse Plein Antwerp, Antwerp
Umpires:
Ben Göntgen (GER)
Kamilė Mockaitytė (LTU)

1 June 2024
11:45

| Argentina | 0–1 | Australia |
|---|---|---|
| | Report | Squibb 48' |

Wilrijkse Plein Antwerp, Antwerp
Umpires:
Sarah Wilson (SCO)
Kamilė Mockaitytė (LTU)

1 June 2024
14:30

| Great Britain | 3–2 | United States |
|---|---|---|
| Owsley 17'; Balsdon 37'; Crackles 44' | Report | Yeager 10'; Gladieux 54' |

Lee Valley Hockey and Tennis Centre, London
Umpires:
Magali Sergeant (BEL)
Laurine Delforge (BEL)

1 June 2024
16:15

| China | 2–1 | Belgium |
|---|---|---|
| Ou 16'; Ma 43' | Report | Ballenghien 41' |

Wilrijkse Plein Antwerp, Antwerp
Umpires:
Jonas van't Hek (NED)
Ole Ingwersen (GER)

1 June 2024
17:15

| Germany | 3–1 | India |
|---|---|---|
| Stapenhorst 13'; Zimmermann 24'; Lorenz 37' | Report | Deepika 23' |

Lee Valley Hockey and Tennis Centre, London
Umpires:
Cookie Tan (SGP)
Ivona Makar (CRO)

2 June 2024
14:00

| Australia | 1–2 | Belgium |
|---|---|---|
| Arnott 17' | Report | Gerniers 28'; Bonami 50' |

Wilrijkse Plein Antwerp, Antwerp
Umpires:
Annelize Rostron (RSA)
Kamilė Mockaitytė (LTU)

2 June 2024
14:30

| Great Britain | 3–2 | India |
|---|---|---|
| Watson 5', 7'; Petter 57' | Report | Navneet 34'; Sharmila 56' |

Lee Valley Hockey and Tennis Centre, London
Umpires:
Cookie Tan (SGP)
Michiel Otten (NED)

2 June 2024
17:15

| Germany | 2–1 | United States |
|---|---|---|
| Nolte 49'; Strauss 51' | Report | Yeager 8' |

Lee Valley Hockey and Tennis Centre, London
Umpires:
Ivona Makar (CRO)
Ahmad El-Sayed (EGY)

2 June 2024
18:30

| Argentina | 1–1 | China |
|---|---|---|
| Gorzelany 60' | Report | Zou 29' |
Penalties
| Díaz (penalty shoot-out scored); Jankunas (penalty shoot-out scored); Thome (penalty shoot-out missed); Albertarrio (penalty shoot-out missed); Raposo (penalty shoot-out missed); Díaz (penalty shoot-out scored) | 3–2 | (penalty shoot-out scored) He; (penalty shoot-out scored) Chen Yi; (penalty shoot-out missed) Dan; (penalty shoot-out missed) Fan; (penalty shoot-out missed) Liu C. (penalty shoot-out missed) He |

Wilrijkse Plein Antwerp, Antwerp
Umpires:
Alison Keogh (IRL)
Ole Ingwersen (GER)

5 June 2024
11:00

| Great Britain | 4–4 | China |
|---|---|---|
| Petter 20'; S. Hamilton 23'; S. Robertson 46'; Balsdon 56' | Report | Ma 5'; Tan 28'; Gu B. 55', 58' |
Penalties
| Howard (penalty shoot-out missed); S. Hamilton (penalty shoot-out missed); Petter (penalty shoot-out scored); Crackles (penalty shoot-out scored); Costello (penalty shoot-out missed); Crackles (penalty shoot-out missed); Petter (penalty shoot-out missed); S. Hamilton (penalty shoot-out scored); Howard (penalty shoot-out missed); Costello (penalty shoot-out scored); Crackles (penalty shoot-out scored); Petter (penalty shoot-out scored) | 6–5 | (penalty shoot-out missed) Chen Yi; (penalty shoot-out scored) Zou; (penalty shoot-out scored) Li H. (penalty shoot-out missed) Ma; (penalty shoot-out missed) Cheng Ya. (penalty shoot-out missed) Zou; (penalty shoot-out missed) Li H. (penalty shoot-out scored) Ma; (penalty shoot-out missed) Chen Yi; (penalty shoot-out scored) Cheng Ya. (penalty shoot-out scored) Zou; (penalty shoot-out missed) Cheng Ya. |

Lee Valley Hockey and Tennis Centre, London
Umpires:
Laurine Delforge (BEL)
Ivona Makar (CRO)

5 June 2024
15:30

| United States | 0–2 | Germany |
|---|---|---|
| | Report | Stapenhorst 20'; Lorenz 43' |

Lee Valley Hockey and Tennis Centre, London
Umpires:
Coen van Bunge (NED)
Magali Sergeant (BEL)

6 June 2024
12:00

| China | 2–3 | Germany |
|---|---|---|
| Yu 16'; Gu 45' | Report | Stapenhorst 11'; Zimmermann 47'; Strauss 55' |

Lee Valley Hockey and Tennis Centre, London
Umpires:
Martin Madden (SCO)
Magali Sergeant (BEL)

6 June 2024
17:45

| Great Britain | 1–3 | United States |
|---|---|---|
| K. Robertson 6' | Report | Valzonis 20'; Sessa 52'; Hoffman 56' |

Lee Valley Hockey and Tennis Centre, London
Umpires:
Cookie Tan (SGP)
Sėbastien Michielsen (BEL)

8 June 2024
10:00

| India | 2–4 | Germany |
|---|---|---|
| Sunelita 9'; Deepika 15' | Report | Huse 23', 32'; Kurz 51'; Bleuel 55' |

Lee Valley Hockey and Tennis Centre, London
Umpires:
Sėbastien Michielsen (BEL)
Magali Sergeant (BEL)

8 June 2024
12:15

| Great Britain | 0–3 | Australia |
|---|---|---|
| | Report | Peris 22'; Greiner 39', 45' |

Lee Valley Hockey and Tennis Centre, London
Umpires:
Cookie Tan (SGP)
Michiel Otten (NED)

9 June 2024
10:00

| Germany | 2–2 | Australia |
|---|---|---|
| Granitzki 36'; Lorenz 39' | Report | T. Stewart 45'; Claxton 51' |
Penalties
| Weidemann (penalty shoot-out scored); Wenzel (penalty shoot-out scored); Strauss (penalty shoot-out missed); Zimmermann (penalty shoot-out scored); Lorenz (penalty shoot-out missed) | 3–4 | (penalty shoot-out scored) Kershaw; (penalty shoot-out missed) Peris; (penalty shoot-out scored) Williams; (penalty shoot-out scored) Lawton; (penalty shoot-out scored) Nobbs |

Lee Valley Hockey and Tennis Centre, London
Umpires:
Laurine Delforge (BEL)
Cookie Tan (SGP)

9 June 2024
12:15

| Great Britain | 3–2 | India |
|---|---|---|
| Watson 3'; Balsdon 56', 58' | Report | Lalremsiami 14'; Navneet 23' |

Lee Valley Hockey and Tennis Centre, London
Umpires:
Ivona Makar (CRO)
Magali Sergeant (BEL)

11 June 2024
13:15

| Great Britain | 3–3 | China |
|---|---|---|
| Howard 5'; Toman 27'; Watson 49' | Report | Zou 37'; Ma 58'; Zhong 59' |
Penalties
| Robertson (penalty shoot-out missed); Owsley (penalty shoot-out missed); Howard (penalty shoot-out scored); Walker (penalty shoot-out scored) | 2–1 | (penalty shoot-out missed) Chen Ya. (penalty shoot-out scored) He; (penalty shoot-out missed) Fan; (penalty shoot-out missed) Ma; (penalty shoot-out missed) Zou |

Lee Valley Hockey and Tennis Centre, London
Umpires:
Cookie Tan (SGP)
Laurine Delforge (BEL)

11 June 2024
17:45

| Australia | 2–3 | Germany |
|---|---|---|
| Arnott 52'; Kershaw 56' | Report | Stapenhorst 3'; Lorenz 36'; Nolte 39' |

Lee Valley Hockey and Tennis Centre, London
Umpires:
Ivona Makar (CRO)
Magali Sergeant (BEL)

12 June 2024
14:15

| China | 3–1 | Germany |
|---|---|---|
| Zhang Y. 27', 60'; Chen Yi 42' | Report | Stoffelsma 37' |

Lee Valley Hockey and Tennis Centre, London
Umpires:
Laurine Delforge (BEL)
Ivona Makar (CRO)

12 June 2024
20:00

| Great Britain | 2–3 | Australia |
|---|---|---|
| Balsdon 5'; Howard 39' | Report | G. Stewart 20'; Peris 30'; Malone 52' |

Lee Valley Hockey and Tennis Centre, London
Umpires:
Magali Sergeant (BEL)
Cookie Tan (SGP)

22 June 2024
16:00

| Netherlands | 4–0 | Germany |
|---|---|---|
| Jansen 8', 46'; Fokke 17'; Matla 48' | Report |

SV Kampong, Utrecht
Umpires:
Rachel Williams (ENG)
Wanri Venter (RSA)

24 June 2024
15:00

| Great Britain | 0–2 | Germany |
|---|---|---|
| | Report | Lorenz 14'; Schröder 23' |

SV Kampong, Utrecht
Umpires:
Sandra Adell (ESP)
Wanri Venter (RSA)

24 June 2024
20:00

| Netherlands | 1–2 | Belgium |
|---|---|---|
| Van der Elst 26' | Report | Englebert 45'; Vanden Borre 53' |

SV Kampong, Utrecht
Umpires:
Sophie Bockelmann (GER)
Rachel Williams (ENG)

25 June 2024
17:30

| Great Britain | 1–2 | Belgium |
|---|---|---|
| Watson 6' | Report | Ballenghien 2'; Blockmans 9' |

SV Kampong, Utrecht
Umpires:
Ayden Shrives (RSA)
Sandra Adell (ESP)

27 June 2024
14:00

| Germany | 4–1 | Great Britain |
|---|---|---|
| Nolte 20'; Davidsmeyer 23'; Stapenhorst 54'; Lorenz 59' | Report | Ansley 59' |

Wagener Stadium, Amstelveen
Umpires:
Sophie Bockelmann (GER)
Hannah Harrison (ENG)

28 June 2024
19:00

| Netherlands | 2–1 | Belgium |
|---|---|---|
| Jansen 6', 27' | Report | Vanden Borre 42' |

Wagener Stadium, Amstelveen
Umpires:
Sandra Adell (ESP)
Hannah Harrison (ENG)

29 June 2024
16:30

| Belgium | 1–1 | Great Britain |
|---|---|---|
| Englebert 33' | Report | Hamilton 14' |
Penalties
| Gerniers (penalty shoot-out scored); Hillewaert (penalty shoot-out missed); Vandermeiren (penalty shoot-out scored); Belis (penalty shoot-out missed) | 2–4 | (penalty shoot-out missed) Hamilton; (penalty shoot-out scored) Watson; (penalty shoot-out scored) Petter; (penalty shoot-out scored) Toman; (penalty shoot-out scored) Costello |

Wagener Stadium, Amstelveen
Umpires:
Wanri Venter (RSA)
Sandra Adell (ESP)

29 June 2024
19:00

| Netherlands | 1–0 | Germany |
|---|---|---|
| De Waard 47' | Report |

Wagener Stadium, Amstelveen
Umpires:
Hannah Harrison (ENG)
Rachel Williams (ENG)

== Goalscorers ==
There were 277 goals scored in 72 matches, for an average of 3.85 goals per match.

19 goals

- (Netherlands) Yibbi Jansen

11 goals

- (Argentina) Agustina Gorzelany

7 goals

- (Argentina) Eugenia Trinchinetti
- (China) Gu Bingfeng
- (Germany) Nike Lorenz

6 goals

- (Netherlands) Fay van der Elst
- (Netherlands) Freeke Moes

5 goals

- (Argentina) María Granatto
- (Argentina) Julieta Jankunas
- (Australia) Grace Stewart
- (Germany) Charlotte Stapenhorst
- (United Kingdom) Grace Balsdon
- (United Kingdom) Charlotte Watson
- (Netherlands) Pien Dicke
- (Netherlands) Frédérique Matla

4 goals

- (Australia) Stephanie Kershaw
- (Australia) Tatum Stewart
- (Belgium) Ambre Ballenghien
- (Belgium) Astrid Bonami
- (Belgium) Stéphanie Vanden Borre
- (India) Deepika Kumari
- (Netherlands) Felice Albers
- (Netherlands) Joosje Burg
- (Netherlands) Luna Fokke
- (Netherlands) Marijn Veen

3 goals

- (Australia) Alice Arnott
- (Australia) Rebecca Greiner
- (Australia) Brooke Peris
- (China) Dan Wen
- (China) Ma Ning
- (China) Yu Anhui
- (China) Zhong Jiaqi
- (China) Zou Meirong
- (Germany) Viktoria Huse
- (Germany) Lisa Nolte
- (Germany) Sara Strauss
- (Germany) Sonja Zimmermann
- (United Kingdom) Tessa Howard
- (United Kingdom) Isabelle Petter
- (India) Vandana Katariya
- (India) Navneet Kaur
- (United States) Ashley Sessa
- (United States) Elizabeth Yeager

2 goals

- (Argentina) Pilar Campoy
- (Argentina) Celina Di Santo
- (Australia) Jane Claxton
- (Belgium) Vanessa Blockmans
- (Belgium) Charlotte Englebert
- (Belgium) Alix Gerniers
- (Belgium) Abi Raye
- (China) Ou Zixia
- (China) Yuan Meng
- (China) Zhang Ying
- (Germany) Jette Fleschütz
- (Germany) Stine Kurz
- (Germany) Lilly Stoffelsma
- (United Kingdom) Sophie Hamilton
- (India) Sangita Kumari
- (Netherlands) Pien Sanders
- (United States) Ashley Hoffman
- (United States) Abigail Tamer

1 goal

- (Argentina) Agustina Albertarrio
- (Argentina) Stefanía Antoniazzi
- (Argentina) Lara Casas
- (Argentina) Victoria Manuele
- (Argentina) Victoria Miranda
- (Argentina) Valentina Raposo
- (Argentina) Victoria Sauze
- (Argentina) Sofía Toccalino
- (Australia) Maddison Brooks
- (Australia) Claire Colwill
- (Australia) Ambrosia Malone
- (Australia) Kaitlin Nobbs
- (Australia) Penny Squibb
- (Belgium) Louise Dewaet
- (Belgium) Pauline Leclef
- (Belgium) Alexia 't Serstevens
- (Belgium) Louise Versavel
- (China) Chen Yi
- (China) Tan Jinzhuang
- (China) Zhang Xiaoxue
- (Germany) Jule Bleuel
- (Germany) Emma Davidsmeyer
- (Germany) Hanna Granitzki
- (Germany) Pauline Heinz
- (Germany) Anne Schröder
- (United Kingdom) Giselle Ansley
- (United Kingdom) Fiona Crackles
- (United Kingdom) Lily Owsley
- (United Kingdom) Katie Robertson
- (United Kingdom) Sarah Robertson
- (United Kingdom) Anna Toman
- (India) Sharmila Devi
- (India) Lalremsiami
- (India) Salima Tete
- (India) Sunelita Toppo
- (Netherlands) Eva Drummond
- (Netherlands) Sanne Koolen
- (Netherlands) Maria Steensma
- (Netherlands) Xan de Waard
- (United States) Sanne Caarls
- (United States) Sophia Gladieux
- (United States) Linnea Gonzales
- (United States) Jacqueline Sumfest
- (United States) Megan Valzonis

Source: FIH

== See also ==
- 2023–24 Men's FIH Pro League
