= Noa Schreurs =

Belgian field hockey player (born 2003)

Personal information
- Born: 25 July 2003 (age 23) Belgium

Sport
- Sport: Field hockey
- Position: Forward
- Club: KHC Dragons
National team
Years	Team	Caps	Goals
2022–2024	Belgium U–21	16	(7)
2024–	Belgium	7	(1)
Medal record
Women's field hockey
Representing Belgium
FIH Junior World Cup
Bronze medal – third place	2023 Santiago	Team
EuroHockey U–21 Championship
Silver medal – second place	2022 Ghent	Team

Noa Schreurs (born 25 July 2003) is a field hockey player from Belgium.

== Career ==
=== Domestic league ===
In the Belgian Hockey League, Schreurs plays for KHC Dragons.

She previously represented Gantoise.

=== Under–21 ===
Schreurs made her international debut at under–21 level in 2022. She was a member of the silver medal-winning Belgium U–21 squad at the EuroHockey U–21 Championship in Ghent.

In 2023 she won a bronze medal at the FIH Junior World Cup in Santiago.

Schreurs made her final appearances for the national junior team in 2024, at the EuroHockey U–21 Championship in Terrassa.

=== Red Panthers ===
Schreurs made her first appearances for the Red Panthers in 2024, during season five of the FIH Pro League. She has since been called into the national squad permanently.

==== International goals ====
Goal	Date	Location	Opponent	Score	Result	Competition	Ref.
1	3 December 2024	Gongshu Canal Sports Park Stadium, Hangzhou, China	China	1–0	2–1	2024–25 FIH Pro League	
