= Emma Reijnen =

Dutch field hockey player (born 2003)

Personal information
- Born: 21 September 2003 (age 22) Engelen, Netherlands

Sport
- Sport: Field hockey
- Position: Midfield
Senior career
Years	Team	Caps	Goals
–	Den Bosch	-	-
National team
Years	Team	Caps	Goals
2023–2024	Netherlands U–21	11	(2)
2024–	Netherlands	4	(1)
Medal record
Women's field hockey
Representing Netherlands
FIH Pro League
Gold medal – first place	Season Six	Team
FIH Junior World Cup
Gold medal – first place	2023 Santiago	Team
EuroHockey U21 Championship
Gold medal – first place	2024 Terrassa	Team

Emma Reijnen (Engelen, 21 September 2003) is a Dutch field hockey player. Reijnen has been playing for HC Den Bosch since her youth. As a child, she transferred from hockey club Vlijmen to Den Bosch, where she started in the F-youth team. From then on, she stayed with the club and completed her entire youth training at Den Bosch. Since the 2021–2022 season, she has been part of the first team, with which she has won multiple national titles and EHLs.

== Personal life ==
Emma Reijnen was born on 21 September 2003, in Engelen.

== Career ==
=== Under–21 ===
Reijnen made her international debut at under–21 level in 2023. She was a member of the gold medal-winning Netherlands U–21 squad at the FIH Junior World Cup in Santiago.

In 2024, Reijnen was named captain of the national junior squad. In July of that year, she led the team to a gold medal at the EuroHockey U21 Championship in Terrassa.

=== Oranje ===
In 2024, Reijnen received her first call-up to the senior national team under new head coach, Raoul Ehren. She will make her senior international debut during season six of the FIH Pro League.
