= Berta Serrahima =

Spanish field hockey player (born 2001)

Personal information
- Full name: Berta Serrahima Castellà
- Born: 6 June 2001 (age 25) Barcelona, Spain

Sport
- Sport: Field hockey
- Position: Midfield
- Club: Junior
National team
Years	Team	Caps	Goals
2022–2022	Spain U–21	5	(1)
2025–	Spain	13	(0)
Medal record
Women's field hockey
Representing Spain
EuroHockey Championship
Bronze medal – third place	2025 Mönchengladbach

Berta Serrahima Castellà (born 6 June 2001) is an international field hockey player from Spain.

== Personal life ==
Berta Serrahima was born and raised in Barcelona. Her older brother and older sister, Marc and Mariona, are also international field hockey players for Spain.

== Field hockey ==
=== Domestic league ===
Serrahima currently competes in the Liga Iberdrola for Junior. She has also represented the team in the Euro Hockey League, the top-level club competition of the European Hockey Federation. The Serrahima family have close ties with the club, as Berta's great-grandfather, Maurici, was the founder of the club.

=== Under–21 ===
In 2022, Serrahima made her first and only appearances for the Spanish U–21 team. She was appointed as captain of the junior squad for the EuroHockey U–21 Championship in Ghent. At the tournament, she led the side to a fifth-place finish.

=== Red Sticks ===
Serrahima received her first call-up to the Red Sticks in 2024. She made her senior international debut the following year during the sixth season of the FIH Pro League. She earned her first senior international cap in an FIH Pro League match against China in Sydney.

In 2025 she was named in the final squad for the EuroHockey Championship in Mönchengladbach.

== Sponsors ==
Serrahima is currently sponsored by Ritual Hockey.
