= Lena Frerichs =

German field hockey player (born 2004)

Personal information
- Born: 16 January 2004 (age 22) Bremen, Germany

Sport
- Sport: Field hockey
- Position: Defence
- Club: Bremer HC
National team
Years	Team	Caps	Goals
2022–	Germany	22	(0)
2022–	Germany U–21	7	(4)
Medal record
Women's field hockey
Representing Germany
FIH Pro League
Silver medal – second place	Season Five	Team
FIH Junior World Cup
Silver medal – second place	2022 Potchefstroom	Team
EuroHockey U–21 Championship
Gold medal – first place	2022 Ghent	Team
EuroHockey U–18 Championship
Gold medal – first place	2021 Valencia	Team

Lena Frerichs (born 16 January 2004) is a field hockey player from Germany.

== Personal life ==
Lena Frerichs was born and raised in Bremen, Germany.

She is a student at the University of Bremen.

== Career ==
=== Domestic leagues ===
In the German Bundesliga, Frerichs represents Bremer HC.

=== Under–21 ===
Frerichs made her debut for the German U–21 team in 2022. She was named in the national junior squad in 2021 for the FIH Junior World Cup in Potchefstroom. Due to the COVID-19 pandemic, the competition was later postponed resulting in squad changes, however she retained her place in the side. At the delayed event in 2022, she helped the German team to a silver medal. Later that year she won a gold medal with the junior squad at the EuroHockey U–21 Championship in Ghent.

=== Die Danas ===
Prior to her departure for the FIH Junior World Cup in 2022, Frerichs received her first call–up to the senior national squad. She made her debut for Die Danas during a match against Spain in the 2021–22 FIH Pro League, held in Düsseldorf.

Since her debut, Frerichs has been a regular inclusion in the national squad. She has featured in seasons four, five and six of the FIH Pro League.
