= 2021 Girls' EuroHockey U18 Championship =

Tournament details
- Host country: Spain
- City: Valencia
- Dates: 19–24 July
- Teams: 5 (from 1 confederation)
- Venue: Estadio Betero

Final positions
- Champions: Germany (3rd title)
- Runner-up: Spain
- Third place: Netherlands

Tournament statistics
- Matches played: 10
- Goals scored: 46 (4.6 per match)
- Top scorer(s): (Germany) Lena Frerichs (Germany) Sara Strauss (5 goals)

The 2021 Girls' EuroHockey Youth Championships was the 11th edition of the Girls' EuroHockey U18 Championship, the biennial international women's under-18 field hockey championship of Europe organized by the European Hockey Federation. It was held alongside the boys' tournament from 19 to 24 July 2021 at the Estadio Betero in Valencia, Spain.

Germany won their third title by finished first in the round-robin tournament, the six-time defending champions the Netherlands finished in third place.

== Qualified teams ==
The following teams participated in the 2021 EuroHockey U18 Championship:

Dates	Event	Location	Quotas	Qualifier(s)
15–21 July 2018	2018 EuroHockey U18 Championship	Santander, Spain	3	Belgium; ~~England~~^{[a]} Germany; ~~Ireland~~^{[a]} Netherlands; Spain
15–21 July 2018	2018 EuroHockey U18 Championship II	Rakovník, Czech Republic	1	Russia; ~~Scotland~~^{[a]}
Total			5	

^[a] – Due to COVID-19 related travel restrictions, England, Ireland and Scotland all withdrew prior to the tournament.

== Standings ==
Pos	Team	Pld	W	D	L	GF	GA	GD	Pts
1st place, gold medalist(s)	Germany (C)	4	4	0	0	21	2	+19	12
2nd place, silver medalist(s)	Spain (H)	4	2	1	1	6	10	−4	7
3rd place, bronze medalist(s)	Netherlands	4	2	0	2	13	6	+7	6
4	Belgium	4	1	0	3	4	12	−8	3
5	Russia	4	0	1	3	2	16	−14	1

Source: EuroHockey
Rules for classification: 1) points; 2) goal difference; 3) goals scored; 4) head-to-head result.
(C) Champions; (H) Hosts

== Fixtures ==
All times are local (UTC+2).

19 July 2021
17:45

Belgium	2–0	Russia
Van Espen 10'; Goffinet 48'	Report

Umpires:
Daniël van der Nat (NED)
Julia Jungbluth (GER)

19 July 2021
20:00

Spain	0–6	Germany
	Report	Strauss 4'; Prumbaum 30'; Frerichs 38', 58'; Schwabe 43'; Lonnes 60'

Umpires:
Lizelotte Wolter (NED)
Thalia Bellemans (BEL)

20 July 2021
17:45

Netherlands	6–0	Russia
Beljaars 3', 39'; Admiraal 11'; Kroot 40'; Van Loon 43'; De Vries 55'	Report

Umpires:
Julia Jungbluth (GER)
Noelia Blancó (ESP)

20 July 2021
20:00

Belgium	1–2	Spain
White 5'	Report	Bousquet Álvarez 8'; Casado 25'

Umpires:
Luka Zupancic (AUT)
Raphaël Adrien (GER)

21 July 2021
17:45

Germany	4–1	Netherlands
Schwabe 6', 49'; Strauss 20', 41'	Report	Winter 39'

Umpires:
Thalia Bellemans (BEL)
Ines El Hajem (FRA)

22 July 2021
11:15

Russia	2–2	Spain
Surianinova 52'; Iusupova 60'	Report	Herrero 22'; Lima 47'

Umpires:
Thomas Hinsken (GER)
Lizelotte Wolter (NED)

23 July 2021
09:00

Netherlands	5–0	Belgium
Van den Broek 22'; Müller 29'; Muijderman 33'; Beljaars 35'; Admiraal 42'	Report

Umpires:
Alejandro Amarillas (ESP)
Julia Jungbluth (GER)

23 July 2021
11:15

Russia	0–6	Germany
	Report	Prumbaum 10', 46'; Frerichs 32', 60'; Stoffelsma 37'; Strauss 51'

Umpires:
Noelia Blancó (ESP)
Corentin Hardy (BEL)

25 July 2021
09:00

Germany	5–1	Belgium
Strauss 18'; Schwabe 35'; Prumbaum 40'; Frerichs 50'; Stoffelsma 53'	Report	Goffinet 51'

Umpires:
Lizelotte Wolter (NED)
Noelia Blancó (ESP)

25 July 2021
11:15

Spain	2–1	Netherlands
Pérez 23'; Bousquet Álvarez 56'	Report	Beljaars 23'

Umpires:
Ines El Hajem (FRA)
Thalia Bellemans (BEL)
