= Julieta Arcidiácono =

Argentine field hockey player

Personal information
- Born: 6 April 2001 (age 25) Argentina

Sport
- Sport: Field hockey
- Position: Midfielder
- Club: Banco Provincia
National team
| Years | Team | Caps | Goals |
| 2017 | Argentina U18 | 7 | (4) |
| 2024–Present | Argentina | 2 | - |

Julieta Arcidiácono (born 6 April 2001) is an Argentine field hockey player.

She won a gold medal at the 2018 PanAmerican Youth Olympics qualifier in Guadalajara. In 2024, Arcidiácono was called into the senior national women's team.
