= Rebecca Manton =

English field hockey player (born 2001)

Personal information
- Born: 24 August 2001 (age 24) England

Sport
- Sport: Field hockey
- Position: Forward
- Club: Wimbledon
National team
| Years | Team | Caps | Goals |
| 2022 | England U–21 | 8 | (1) |
| 2024– | England | 3 | (1) |
Medal record
Women's field hockey
Representing England
FIH Junior World Cup
| Bronze medal – third place | 2022 Potchefstroom | Team |

Rebecca 'Becky' Manton (born 24 August 2001) is a field hockey player from England.

== Career ==
=== Under–21 ===
In 2022, Manton was named in the revised England U–21 for the FIH Junior World Cup in Potchefstroom after the tournament was rescheduled. At the delayed event, the team went on to win England's first ever bronze medal.

=== Senior national squad ===
Following the 2024 Summer Olympics, a restructured England squad was announced, including Manton. She made her senior international debut in December 2024 during a match against China during the Hangzhou leg of season six of the FIH Pro League. She also scored in her debut match.

==== International goals ====
| Goal | Date | Location | Opponent | Score | Result | Competition | Ref. |
|---|---|---|---|---|---|---|---|
| 1 | 1 December 2024 | Gongshu Canal Sports Park Stadium, Hangzhou, China | China | 1–0 | 1–2 | 2024–25 FIH Pro League | |
