= Cassie Sumfest =

American field hockey player

Personal information
- Full name: Jacqueline Sumfest
- Born: December 10, 1998 (age 27) Lewisburg, Pennsylvania, U.S.
- Height: 5 ft 5 in (165 cm)

Sport
- Sport: Field hockey
- Position: Defence
Senior career
Years	Team	Caps	Goals
–	WC Eagles	-	-
National team
Years	Team	Caps	Goals
2021–	United States	22	(0)

Jacqueline "Cassie" Sumfest (born December 10, 1998) is a field hockey player from the United States, who plays as a defender.

== Personal life ==
Cassie Sumfest was born and raised in Lewisburg, Pennsylvania.

She studied her major in business administration at the University of North Carolina.

== Career ==
=== Domestic leagues ===
In 2022 Sumfest travelled to Australia to play for the Tassie Tigers in the Sultana Bran Hockey One League.

=== National team ===
Sumfest made her debut for the national team in 2021, during a test series against Canada in Chula Vista.

She has since gone on to appear in season three of the FIH Pro League and at the 2022 Pan American Cup in Santiago.
