= Sol Lombardo =

Argentine field hockey player (born 1999)

María Sol Lombardo
Personal information
- Born: 10 March 1999 (age 27) Buenos Aires, Argentina

Sport
- Sport: Field hockey
- Position: Defender
- Club: Italiano
Senior career
Years	Team	Caps	Goals
–2023	Italiano	-	-
National team
Years	Team	Caps	Goals
2019–Present	Argentina	15	(0)
Medal record
Pro League
Gold medal – first place	2021-22
South American Games
Silver medal – second place	2022 Asunción

María Sol Lombardo (born 10 March 1999) is an Argentine field hockey player.

== International career ==
Since 2019, Lombardo has played in the Argentina women's national field hockey team. She won with the team the 2021–22 Women's FIH Pro League and won the silver medal at the 2022 South American Games.
