= Madeleine Axford =

English field hockey player (born 2003)

Personal information
- Born: 28 March 2003 (age 23) Bedford, England

Sport
- Sport: Field hockey
- Position: Midfield
- Club: University of Nottingham
National team
Years	Team	Caps	Goals
2022–2023	England U–21	20	(4)
2025–	England	2	(0)
Medal record
Women's field hockey
Representing England
FIH Junior World Cup
Bronze medal – third place	2022 Potchefstroom	Team

Madeleine 'Maddie' Axford (born 28 March 2003) is a field hockey player from England.

== Personal life ==
Madeleine Axford was born and raised in Bedford, England. She is the youngest of three siblings, with her brother, Charlie, and sister, Kate, also playing field hockey at a junior level for England.

She currently studies at the University of Nottingham, and is an alumnus of Bedford Girls' School.

== Career ==
=== Under–21 ===
In 2021, Axford was named in the England U–21 squad for the FIH Junior World Cup in Potchefstroom. Due to the COVID-19 pandemic, the competition was later postponed resulting in squad changes, however Axford retained her place in the side. At the delayed event, she helped the team to England's first ever bronze medal. Later that year she represented the team again at the EuroHockey U–21 Championship in Ghent.

In 2023, Axford represented the English U–21 side again. She featured in the fourth-place finish at the FIH Junior World Cup in Santiago.

=== Senior national squad ===
Axford received her maiden call up to the senior national squad in early 2025. She travelled with the team to India for the second away leg of the 2024–25 FIH Pro League. She earned her first international cap during a match against India in Bhubaneswar.
