= Mette Winter =

Dutch field hockey player

Personal information
- Full name: Mette Ijmkje Jantina Winter
- Born: 15 January 2003 (age 23) Deventer, Netherlands

Sport
- Sport: Field hockey
- Position: Forward
Senior career
Years	Team	Caps	Goals
–	SCHC	-	-
National team
Years	Team	Caps	Goals
2022–	Netherlands U–21	22	(11)
2024–	Netherlands	0	(0)
Medal record
Women's field hockey
Representing Netherlands
FIH Junior World Cup
Gold medal – first place	2022 Potchefstroom	Team
Gold medal – first place	2023 Santiago	Team
EuroHockey U21 Championship
Gold medal – first place	2024 Terrassa	Team
Bronze medal – third place	2022 Ghent	Team

Mette Ijmkje Jantina Winter (born January 15, 2003) is a field hockey player from the Netherlands.

== Personal life ==
Mette Winter was born on 15 January 2003, in Deventer.

== Career ==
=== Under–21 ===
Winter made her international debut at under–21 level. She was a member of the gold medal-winning Netherlands U–21 side at the 2022 FIH Junior World Cup in Potchefstroom. Later that year she represented the team again, winning bronze at the EuroHockey U21 Championship in Ghent.

In 2023, she was a member of the national junior side at the FIH Junior World Cup in Santiago. The team won the tournament, making that her second FIH Junior World Cup gold medal.

Winter made her final appearances for the national junior team in 2024, winning gold at the 2024 EuroHockey U21 Championship in Terrassa.

=== Oranje ===
In 2024, Winter received her first call-up to the senior national team under new head coach, Raoul Ehren. She will make her senior international debut during season six of the FIH Pro League.
