= Maria Steensma =

Dutch field hockey player

Personal information
- Full name: Maria Bobbie Steensma
- Born: 25 September 2001 (age 24) The Hague, Netherlands

Sport
- Sport: Field hockey
- Position: Forward
Senior career
| Years | Team | Caps | Goals |
| – | Pinoké | - | - |
National team
| Years | Team | Caps | Goals |
| 2022 | Netherlands U–21 | 12 | (6) |
| 2022– | Netherlands | 3 | (1) |
Medal record
Women's field hockey
Representing Netherlands
FIH Junior World Cup
| Gold medal – first place | 2022 Potchefstroom | Team |
EuroHockey Junior Championship
| Bronze medal – third place | 2022 Ghent | Team |
EuroHockey Youth Championship
| Gold medal – first place | 2018 Santander | Team |

Maria Bobbie Steensma (born 25 September 2001) is a Dutch field hockey player for the Netherlands national team.

== Personal life ==
Maria Steensma was born and raised in The Hague.

== Career ==
=== Domestic hockey ===
In the Netherlands' domestic league, the Hoofdklasse, Steensma represents Pinoké.

=== Under–18 ===
In 2018, Steensma was a member of the Netherlands U–18 team that won gold at the 2018 EuroHockey Youth Championship in Santander.

=== Junior national team ===
Steensma made her debut for the junior national team in 2022 at the FIH Junior World Cup in Potchefstroom, where the Dutch won the gold medal. Later that year she represented the team again at the EuroHockey Junior Championship in Ghent, where she won a bronze medal.

=== Senior ===
Following her success in the national junior teams, Steensma was called up to make her senior international debut in 2022. She made her first appearance in a 2021–22 FIH Pro League match against England.

In 2023, she was named in the national squad. She has since appeared in season four of the FIH Pro League.

==== International goals ====
| Goal | Date | Location | Opponent | Score | Result | Competition | Ref. |
|---|---|---|---|---|---|---|---|
| 1 | 10 December 2023 | Polideportivo Provincial, Santiago del Estero, Argentina | Great Britain | 5–1 | 5–1 | 2023–24 FIH Pro League | |
