= Zeng Xueling =

Chinese field hockey player

Personal information
- Born: 9 February 2003 (age 23) China

Sport
- Sport: Field hockey
- Position: Midfield
National team
Years	Team	Caps	Goals
2023–	China	11	(0)
Medal record
Women's field hockey
Representing China
Asian Champions Trophy
Silver medal – second place	2024 Rajgir
Bronze medal – third place	2023 Ranchi
Junior Asia Cup
Silver medal – second place	2024 Muscat	Team

Zeng Xueling (born 9 February 2003) is a field hockey player from China, who plays in the midfield.

== Career ==
=== National team ===
Zeng Xueling made her senior international debut for China in 2023. She made her first appearance during a match against Germany during season three of the FIH Pro League. She made numerous more appearances during the FIH Pro League, as well as during a test series against Australia in Perth. Zeng closed out 2023 with a bronze medal performance at the Asian Champions Trophy in Ranchi.

In 2024, Zeng was named in the national squad her second Asian Champions Trophy to be held in Rajgir.
