= Valentin Altenburg =

German field hockey coach

Valentin Altenburg (born 4 June 1981) is a German field hockey coach. He coached the German national team at the 2016 Summer Olympics, where the team won the bronze medal.
