= Valentina Marcucci =

Argentine field hockey player

Personal information
- Born: 21 February 1998 (age 28) Buenos Aires, Argentina

Sport
- Sport: Field hockey
- Position: Midfielder
- Club: Lomas Athletic Club
National team
Years	Team	Caps	Goals
2021–present	Argentina	8	-
Medal record
World Cup
Silver medal – second place	2022 Terrassa/Amstelveen

Valentina Marcucci (born 21 February 1998) is an Argentine field hockey player.

== Hockey career ==
In 2021, Marcucci was called into the senior national women's team.
