= Vanessa Blockmans =

Belgian field hockey player (born 2002)

Personal information
- Born: 4 April 2002 (age 24)

Sport
- Sport: Field hockey
- Position: Defence
Senior career
Years	Team	Caps	Goals
–	Kampong	-	-
National team
Years	Team	Caps	Goals
2019–	Belgium U–21	10	(2)
2020–	Belgium	20	(1)
Medal record
Women's field hockey
Representing Belgium
World Cup
Bronze medal – third place	2026 Wavre/Amstelveen
EuroHockey Championship
Silver medal – second place	2023 Mönchengladbach
EuroHockey Championship
Silver medal – second place	2022 Ghent	Team

Vanessa Blockmans (born 4 April 2002) is a Belgian field hockey player.

== Career ==
=== Domestic hockey ===
Blockmans plays abroad in the Netherlands' domestic league, the Hoofdklasse, where she represents Kampong.

=== Under–21 ===
Blockmans made her debut for the Belgium U–21 in 2019 at the EuroHockey Junior Championship in Valencia.

In 2022, she was a member of team that won silver at the EuroHockey Junior Championship in Ghent.

=== National team ===
Blockmans made her senior international debut in 2020, during season two of the FIH Pro League.

She has since gone on to represent the Red Panthers in seasons three and four of the FIH Pro League.

==== International goals ====
Goal	Date	Location	Opponent	Score	Result	Competition	Ref.
1	27 May 2022	Lee Valley Hockey Stadium, London, Great Britain	China	1–0	3–1	2022–23 FIH Pro League	
