= Delphine Marien =

Belgian field hockey player

Personal information
- Full name: Daphne-Delphine Marien
- Born: 27 March 2002 (age 24)

Sport
- Sport: Field hockey
- Position: Midfield
Senior career
Years	Team	Caps	Goals
–	KHC Dragons	-	-
National team
Years	Team	Caps	Goals
2022–	Belgium U–21	5	(0)
2023–	Belgium	14	(4)
Medal record
Women's field hockey
Representing Belgium
World Cup
Bronze medal – third place	2026 Wavre/Amstelveen
EuroHockey Championship
Silver medal – second place	2023 Mönchengladbach
EuroHockey Junior Championship
Silver medal – second place	2022 Ghent

Daphne-Delphine Marien (born 27 March 2002) is a Belgian field hockey player.

== Career ==
=== Domestic hockey ===
In Belgium's domestic league, the ION Hockey League, Marien represents KHC Dragons.

=== Under–21 ===
In 2022, Marien was a member of the Belgium U–21 team that won silver at the EuroHockey Junior Championship in Ghent.

=== National team ===
Marien made her senior international debut in 2021, during season three of the FIH Pro League.

==== International goals ====
Goal	Date	Location	Opponent	Score	Result	Competition	Ref.
1	21 May 2022	Wilrijkse Plein, Antwerp, Belgium	Spain	1–0	3–0	2021–22 FIH Pro League	
2	18 June 2023	Wilrijkse Plein, Antwerp, Belgium	New Zealand	1–0	7–0	2022–23 FIH Pro League	
3	18 June 2023	Wilrijkse Plein, Antwerp, Belgium	New Zealand	4–0	7–0	2022–23 FIH Pro League	
4	2 July 2023	Wilrijkse Plein, Antwerp, Belgium	United States	2–0	4–0	2022–23 FIH Pro League	
