= Benedetta Wenzel =

German field hockey player (born 1997)

Personal information
- Born: 31 March 1997 (age 29)

Sport
- Sport: Field hockey

Benedetta Wenzel (born 31 March 1997) is a German field hockey player. She represented Germany at the 2024 Summer Olympics.
