= Lilly Stoffelsma =

German field hockey player

Personal information
- Full name: Lilly Paulin Stoffelsma
- Born: 22 April 2002 (age 24) Germany

Sport
- Sport: Field hockey
- Position: Midfield
- Club: Düsseldorf
National team
Years	Team	Caps	Goals
2018–2021	Germany U–18	40	(18)
2022–	Germany	3	(0)
2022–	Germany U–21	0	(0)
Medal record
Women's field hockey
Representing Germany
EuroHockey Championship
Silver medal – second place	2025 Mönchengladbach
EuroHockey Youth Championship
Gold medal – first place	2021 Valencia

Lilly Paulin Stoffelsma (born 12 August 2002) is a German field hockey player.

== Career ==
=== Club level ===
In club competition, Stoffelsma plays for Düsseldorf in the German Bundesliga.

=== National teams ===
==== Under–18 ====
Lilly Stoffelsma made her international debut for Germany at U–18 level. She first represented the team in 2018 during a test series against France in Paris. Later that year, she appeared at the 2018 edition of the EuroHockey Youth Championship in Santander.

She went on to represent the youth side a number of times, most notably winning gold at the 2021 EuroHockey Youth Championship in Valencia.

==== Under–21 ====
In 2022, Stoffelsma was named in the German U–21 squad for the 2022 FIH Junior World Cup in Potchefstroom, and 2023 FIH Hockey Junior World Cup in Santiago.

==== Die Danas ====
Stoffelsma made her senior debut for Die Danas in 2022. Her first appearance was during season three of the FIH Pro League, in Germany's away matches against Belgium. She later went on to compete in the away matches against India, and was a penalty taker for Germany in the deciding shoot-outs.
