= Charlotte Englebert =

Belgian field hockey player

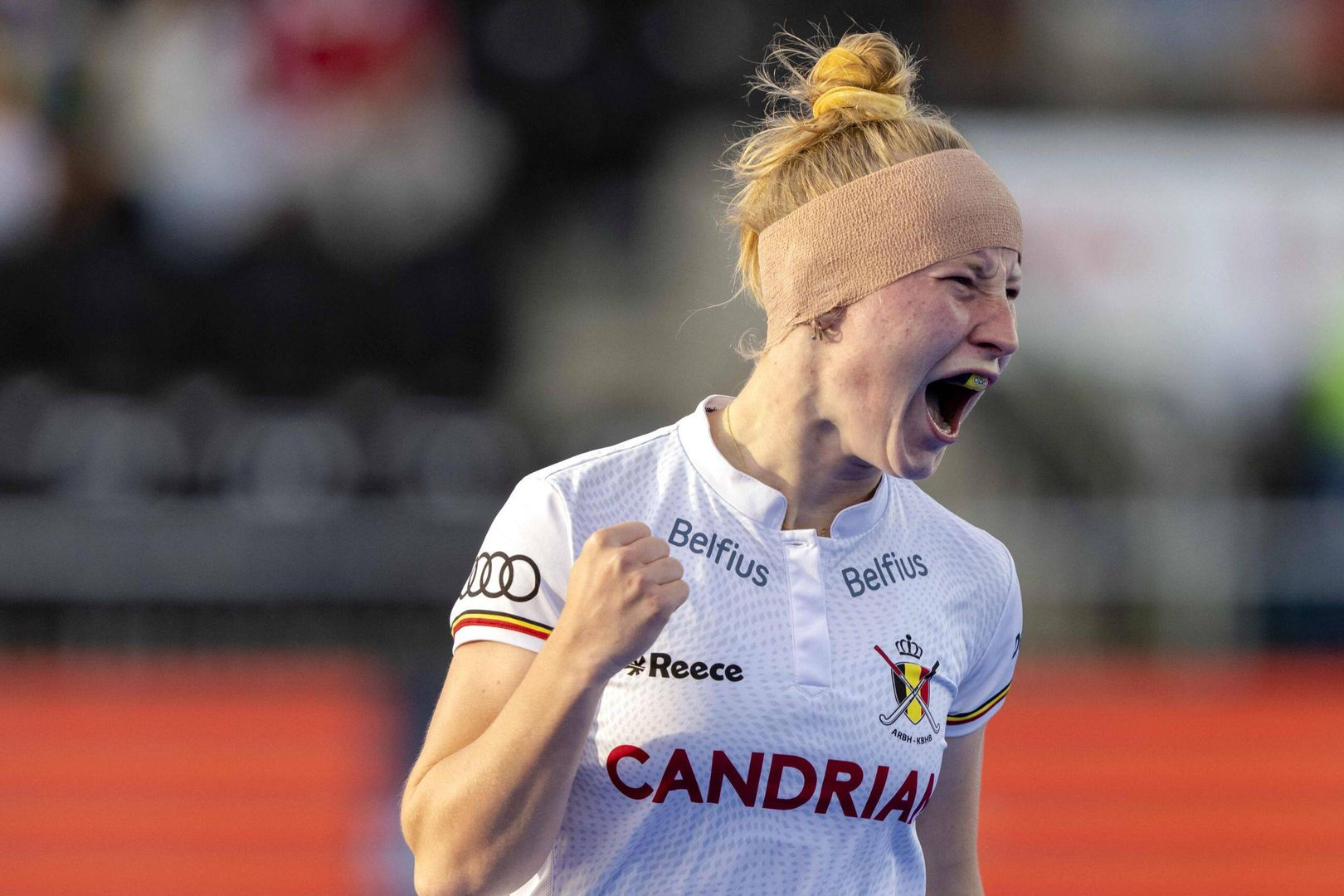

Personal information
- Born: 20 May 2001 (age 25)

Sport
- Sport: Field hockey
- Position: MD/FW
- Club: HC Den Bosch (2023–)
Youth career
- Team
- –: Royal Racing Club de Bruxelles
- –: RHCN
National team
Years	Team	Caps	Goals
2018	Belgium U–18	5	(1)
2019–2022	Belgium U–21	10	(8)
2018–	Belgium	80	(26)
Medal record
Women's field hockey
Representing Belgium
World Cup
Bronze medal – third place	2026 Wavre/Amstelveen
European Championship
Silver medal – second place	2023 Mönchengladbach
Bronze medal – third place	2021 Amstelveen
Hero Hockey Indian League
Silver medal – second place	2025 Ranchi (India)
EuroHockey Youth Championship
Silver medal – second place	2018 Santander
European Junior Championship
Silver medal – second place	2022 Ghent

Charlotte Englebert (born 20 May 2001) is a Belgian field hockey player, who plays as a midfielder.

== Career ==
=== Club hockey ===
In the Belgian Hockey League, Englebert plays club hockey for the Royal Racing Club.

They finish second after their first apparence in honour division during the 2018–2019 season.

From this they finish 3rd in 2021-2022/2022-2023.

In 2023, Englebert crossed the border to play for Den Bosch, renowned for being the best women's club in the world.

During her first year at her new club, they were crowned Dutch champions, defeating Kampong in the semifinals and SCHC in the final.

In 2024–2025, the Den Bosch team achieved several successes: Gold Cup champion against Tilburg (1–2), EHL champion during the Easter weekend against the Belgian team Braxgata (5–1).

=== National teams ===
==== Under–18 ====
In 2018, Englebert was a member of the Belgium U–18 team at the EuroHockey Youth Championship in Santander. At the tournament, Belgium finished in second place, taking home silver.

==== Under–21 ====
Following her debut for the Under–18 side in 2018, Englebert appeared in the national Under–21 in 2019. She represented the team at the EuroHockey Junior Championship in Valencia. The team finished fourth, qualifying for the 2021 FIH Junior World Cup.

In July 2022, she made her last appearance with the national Under–21. She represented the team at the EuroHockey Junior Championship in Ghent, Belgium. The team finished second, qualifying for the 2023 FIH Junior World Cup.

==== Red Panthers ====
Englebert made her debut for the Belgium 'Red Panthers' in 2018 during a test series against the United States in Lancaster.

==== Indian Hockey League ====
During the 2024–2025 season, Englebert was signed by the Soorma Hockey Club for 16 lakh (1.6 million Indian rupees/18.000 euros) in the Hockey India League (HIL).

Soorma Hockey Club finished second in the inaugural season, with Englebert finishing as top scorer with Yibbi Jansen.

Goal	Date	Location	Opponent	Goal(s)	Result	Competition
1	12 January 2025	Ranchi, Marang Gomke Jaipal Singh, India	Shrachi Rarh Bengal Tigers VS JSW Soorma Hockey Club	1–2	1–4	Hero Hockey India League 2025 (Women)
2	20 January 2025	Ranchi, Marang Gomke Jaipal Singh, India	JSW Soorma Hockey Club VS Delhi SG Pipers	1–0	5–1	Hero Hockey India League 2025 (Women)
5	24 January 2025	Ranchi, Marang Gomke Jaipal Singh, India	JSW Soorma Hockey Club VS Shrachi Rarh Bengal Tigers	1–0/3-0/4-0	4–3	Hero Hockey India League 2025 (Women)

=== International goals ===
Goal	Date	Location	Opponent	Goal(s)	Result	Competition
1	25 January 2020	Sydney, Sydney Olympic Park, Sydney, Australia	AUS VS BEL	1–2	3–3	2020–21 FIH Hockey Pro League
2	7 June 2022	Antwerp, Sportcentrum Wilrijkse Plein-Antwerp, Belgium	BEL VS CHN	1–0	3–1	2021–22 FIH Hockey Pro League
3	12 June 2022	Antwerp, Sportcentrum Wilrijkse Plein-Antwerp, Belgium	BEL VS IND	2–0	5–0	2021–22 FIH Hockey Pro League
5	3 July 2022	Terrassa, Estadi Olímpic de Terrassa, Spain	BEL VS SA	1-3/1-4	1–4	FIH Hockey Women's World Cup Spain & Netherlands 2022
7	9 July 2022	Amsterdam, Wagener Hockey Stadium, Netherlands	CHIL VS BEL	0-3/0-5	0–5	FIH Hockey Women's World Cup Spain & Netherlands 2022
8	4 November 2022	Mendoza, Estadio Mendocino de Hockey, Argentina	BEL VS GER	3–3	3–3	2022–23 FIH Hockey Pro League
10	4 June 2023	London, Lee Valley Olympic Stadium, United-Kingdom	GB VS BEL	0–2 /0-3	0–3	2022–23 FIH Hockey Pro League
11	18 June 2023	Antwerp, Sportcentrum Wilrijkse Plein-Antwerp, Belgium	BEL VS NZ	3–0	7–0	2022–23 FIH Hockey Pro League
12	2 July 2023	Antwerp, Sportcentrum Wilrijkse Plein-Antwerp, Belgium	BEL VS USA	4–0	4–0	2022–23 FIH Hockey Pro League
14	19 August 2023	Mönchengladbach, Hockeypark Mönchengladbach, Germany	BEL VS ITA	3–0 /4-0	6–0	EuroHockey Championship 2023 Women
16	22 August 2023	Mönchengladbach, Hockeypark Mönchengladbach, Germany	ESP VS BEL	0–2 /0-4	0–5	EuroHockey Championship 2023 Women
17	16 January 2024	Valencia, Estadio Betero, Spain	BEL VS UKR	11–0	13–0	FIH Hockey Olympic Qualifiers 2024 Valencia
18	20 January 2024	Valencia, Estadio Betero, Spain	SPA VS BEL	1–2	1–2	FIH Hockey Olympic Qualifiers 2024 Valencia
19	24 June 2024	SV Kampong, Utrecht, Nederlands	NED VS BEL	1–1	1–2	2023–24 FIH Hockey Pro League
20	29 June 2024	Amsterdam, Wagener Hockey Stadium, Netherlands	GB VS BEL	1–1	1–1	2023–24 FIH Hockey Pro League
21	28 July 2024	Paris, Stade Yves du Manoir	BEL VS CHI	1–2	1–2	2024 Paris Olympic Games
22	31 July 2024	Paris, Stade Yves du Manoir	BEL VS JAP	2–0	3–0	2024 Paris Olympic Games
23	5 August 2024	Paris, Stade Yves du Manoir	BEL VS SPA	2–0	2–0	2024 Paris Olympic Games
24	30 November 2024	Hangzhou, China	CHI VS BEL	2–2	2–2	2024–25 FIH Hockey Pro League
26	5 December 2024	Hangzhou, China	ENG VS BEL	2–6/2-8	2–8	2024–25 FIH Hockey Pro League
27	17 June 2025	Anwterpen, Belgium	BEL VS SPA	1–0	6–0	2024–25 FIH Hockey Pro League
28	21 June 2025	Anwterpen, Belgium	IND VS BEL	5–1	5–1	2024–25 FIH Hockey Pro League
29	5 December 2025	Dublin, Ireland	ENG VS BEL	0–3	0–3	2025–26 FIH Hockey Pro League
30	12 December 2025	Dublin, Ireland	BEL VS ENG	2–1	2–1	2025–26 FIH Hockey Pro League
31	13 December 2025	Dublin, Ireland	BEL VS IRL	1–0	1–2	2024–25 FIH Hockey Pro League
32	16 June 2026	Antwerpen, Belgium	BEL VS CHI	4–0	5–0	2025–26 FIH Hockey Pro League
33	20 June 2026	Antwerpen, Belgium	BEL VS ARG	2–2	2–3	2025–26 FIH Hockey Pro League
34	26 June 2026	Antwerpen, Belgium	BEL VS AUS	1–0	2–1	2025–26 FIH Hockey Pro League
35	16 August 2026	Wavre, Belgium	BEL VS NZ	3–1	5–2	FIH WorldCup 2026
36	20 August 2026	Wavre, Belgium	BEL VS IRL	1–1	2–1	FIH WorldCup 2026
37	22 August 2026	Wavre, Belgium	GER VS BEL	1–3	1–3	FIH WorldCup 2026
