= Sara Strauss =

German field hockey player (born 2002)

Personal information
- Born: 12 August 2002 (age 24) Germany

Sport
- Sport: Field hockey
- Position: Forward
- Club: Düsseldorfer
National team
Years	Team	Caps	Goals
2022–	Germany	2	(0)
2022–	Germany U–21	0	(0)
Medal record
Women's field hockey
Representing Germany
EuroHockey Championship
Silver medal – second place	2025 Mönchengladbach
EuroHockey Youth Championship
Gold medal – first place	2021 Valencia

Sara Strauss (born 12 August 2002) is a German field hockey player.

== Career ==
=== Club level ===
In club competition, Strauss plays for Düsseldorfer in the German Bundesliga.

=== National teams ===
==== Under–18 ====
Felicia Wiedermann made her international debut for Germany at U–18 level. She represented the team at the 2021 edition of the EuroHockey Youth Championship in Valencia.

==== Under–21 ====
In 2022, Strauss was named in the German U–21 squad for the FIH Junior World Cup in Potchefstroom.

==== Die Danas ====
Strauss made her senior debut for Die Danas in 2022. Her first appearance was during season three of the FIH Pro League, in Germany's away matches against India. In both matches, Strauss was a penalty taker for Germany in the deciding shoot-outs.
