= Belgium women's national under-21 field hockey team =

Belgium
- Nickname(s): Young Red Panthers
- Association: Royal Belgian Hockey Association
- Confederation: EHF (Europe)
- Head Coach: Tim White
- Assistant coach(es): Thomas Briels
- Manager: Suzanne Van Praet
- Captain: Charlotte Englebert

Junior World Cup
- Appearances: 4 (first in 2013)
- Best result: (bronze) 3rd (2023, 2025)

EuroHockey Junior Championship
- Appearances: 11 (first in 1979)
- Best result: (silver) 2nd (2017, 2022)
Medal record
Junior World Cup
Bronze medal – third place	2023 Santiago
Bronze medal – third place	2025 Santiago
EuroHockey Junior Championship
Silver medal – second place	2022 Ghent
Silver medal – second place	2017 Valencia
Bronze medal – third place	1979 Düsseldorf

The Belgium women's national under-21 field hockey team represents Belgium in women's international under-21 field hockey competitions and is controlled by the Royal Belgian Hockey Association, the governing body for field hockey in Belgium. The team plays in the EuroHockey Junior Championships and has qualified five times for the Junior World Cup. Their best results are two bronze medals in 2023 and 2025.

== Tournament record ==
=== Junior World Cup ===
- 2013 – 13th place
- 2016 – 6th place
- 2022 – Withdrew
- 2023 – (bronze)
- 2025 – (bronze)
- 2027 – Qualified

=== EuroHockey Junior Championship ===
- 1979 – (bronze)
- 1981 – 4th place
- 1984 – 6th place
- 2008 – 7th place
- 2012 – 5th place
- 2014 – 5th place
- 2017 – (silver)
- 2019 – 4th place
- 2022 – (silver)
- 2024 – 5th place
- 2026 – 4th place

=== EuroHockey Junior Championship II ===
- 2000 – 6th place
- 2006 – (silver)
- 2010 – (gold)

=== EuroHockey Junior Championship III ===
- 2004 – (silver)

== See also ==
- Belgium men's national under-21 field hockey team
- Belgium women's national field hockey team
