= Women's FIH Pro League =

International field hockey competition

- Current season, competition or edition: 2026–27 Women's FIH Pro League
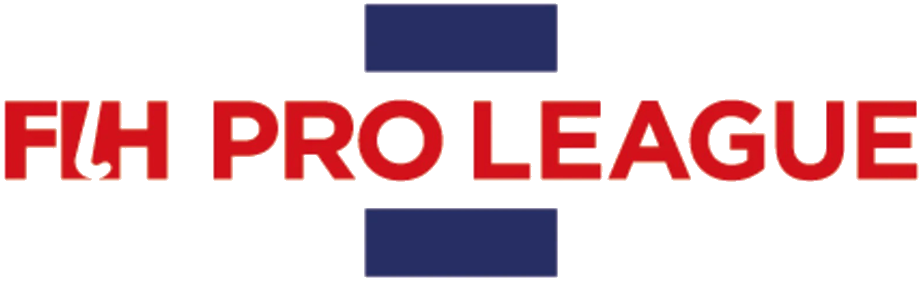
- Formerly: Hockey World League
- Sport: Field hockey
- Founded: 2017; 9 years ago
- First season: 2019
- No. of teams: 9
- Continent: International (FIH)
- Most recent champion: Netherlands (6th title) (2025–26)
- Most titles: Netherlands (6 titles)
- Relegation to: FIH Hockey Nations Cup
- Website: fihproleague.com

The Women's FIH Pro League is an international women's field hockey competition organized by the International Hockey Federation (FIH), which replaces the Women's FIH Hockey World League. The competition also serves as a qualifier for the Hockey World Cup and the first edition also did for the Olympic Games.

The first edition was started in 2019. Nine teams secured their places for four years.

== Format ==
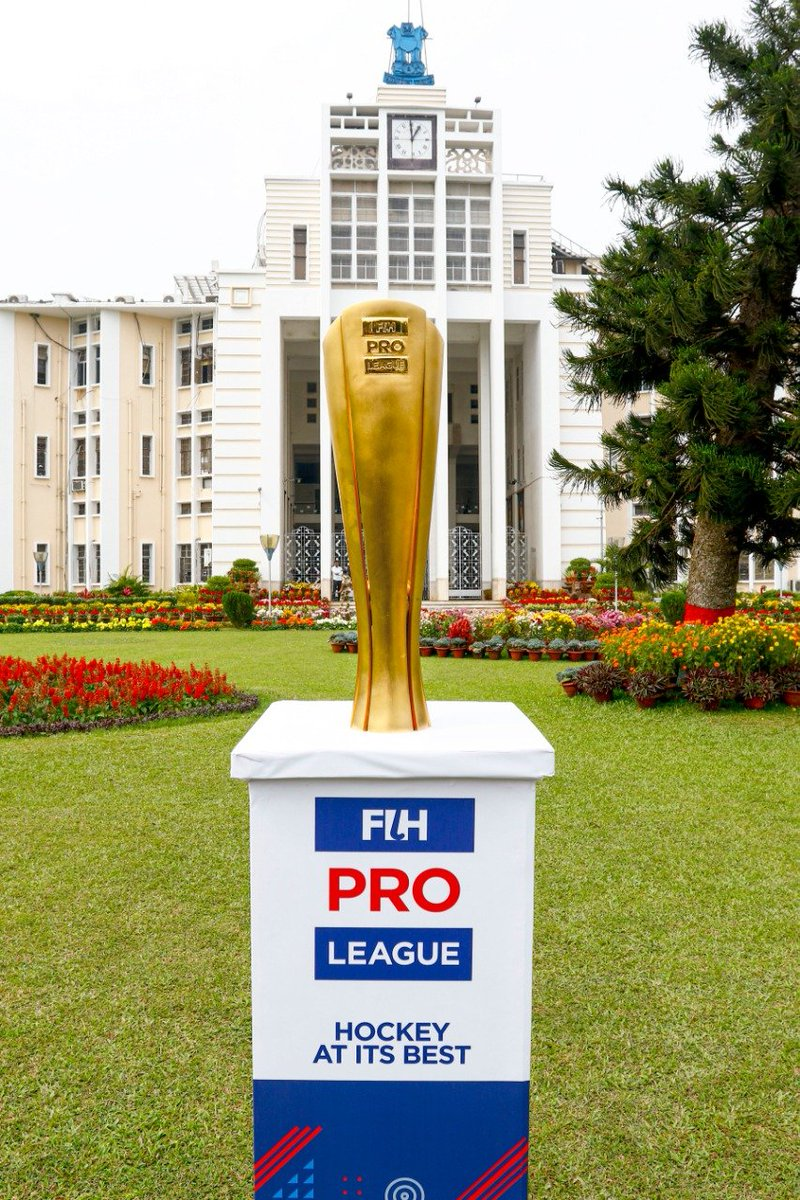
FIH Pro League Trophy

Nine teams will compete in a round-robin tournament with home and away matches, played from January to June, with the top four teams advancing to the grand final at a pre-determined location. In July 2017, Hockey India decided to withdraw both the men's and women's national teams from the competition as they estimated the chances of qualifying for the Summer Olympics to be higher when participating in the Hockey Series. Hockey India also cited lack of clarity in the ranking system. The International Hockey Federation subsequently invited Belgium instead.

On 17 September 2021, both, New Zealand and Australia, withdrew from the 2021–22 season due to the COVID-19 pandemic and the travel restrictions coming with it. They were replaced by India and Spain on 8 October 2021. For the 2023–24 season, New Zealand withdraw and was replaced by the United States.

Current teams

- Argentina
- Australia
- Belgium
- China
- Germany
- Great Britain
- India
- Netherlands
- Spain

Former teams

- Ireland (relegated from 2025–26 season)
- New Zealand (withdrew for the 2025–26 season)
- United States (relegated from 2023–24 season)

=== 2020 format changes ===
For the 2020 edition, the home and away principle is kept but this principle will now be split over two consecutive seasons and work according to the following example:

- in 2020, Team A will host Team B twice within a couple of days
- in 2021, Team B will host Team A twice within a couple of days

Also this new format removes the grand final event, held in the previous edition.

=== 2022 format changes ===
From 2022 onwards the bottom team at the end of the season will be relegated and will be replaced by the winner of a new competition called the Women's FIH Hockey Nations Cup.

The home and away principle will be kept, however the season will be divided into date blocks. To assist with competition planning, international and national, several teams will gather in on venue to contest "mini-tournaments", wherein they each play two matches against one another.

== Results ==
Edition	Season	Final			Third place match			Teams GS / FR
Edition	Season	Champions	Score	Runners-up	Third place	Score	Fourth place	Teams GS / FR
1	2019	Netherlands	2–2 (4–3 p.s.o.)	Australia	Germany	1–1 (3–1 p.s.o.)	Argentina	9 / 4
2	2020–21	Netherlands	Round-robin	Argentina	Great Britain	Round-robin	Germany	9
3	2021–22	Argentina	Round-robin	Netherlands	India	Round-robin	Belgium	9
4	2022–23	Netherlands	Round-robin	Argentina	Australia	Round-robin	Belgium	9
5	2023–24	Netherlands	Round-robin	Germany	Argentina	Round-robin	Belgium	9
6	2024–25	Netherlands	Round-robin	Argentina	Belgium	Round-robin	China	9
7	2025–26	Netherlands	Round-robin	Argentina	Belgium	Round-robin	China	9

== Summary ==
Team	Winners	Runners-up	Third place	Fourth place
Netherlands	6 (2019*, 2020–21, 2022–23, 2023–24, 2024–25, 2025–26)	1 (2021–22)		
Argentina	1 (2021–22)	4 (2020–21, 2022–23, 2024–25, 2025–26)	1 (2023–24)	1 (2019)
Germany		1 (2023–24)	1 (2019)	1 (2020–21
Australia		1 (2019)	1 (2022–23)	
Belgium			2 (2024–25, 2025–26)	3 (2021–22, 2022–23, 2023–24)
Great Britain			1 (2020–21)	
India			1 (2021–22)	
China				2 (2024–25, 2025–26)

* = Grand Final hosts

== Performance by nations ==
Team	2019	2020–21	2021–22	2022–23	2023–24	2024–25	2025–26	2026–27	Total
Argentina	4th	2nd	1st	2nd	3rd	2nd	2nd	Q	8
Australia	2nd	5th	WD	3rd	6th	5th	8th	Q	6
Belgium	5th	7th	4th	4th	4th	3rd	3rd	Q	8
China	7th	8th	8th	7th	5th	4th	4th	Q	8
England	Part of GB		7th	Part of GB		8th	7th	Part of GB	3
Germany	3rd	4th	6th	5th	2nd	7th	5th	Q	8
Great Britain	8th	3rd	–	6th	7th	–	–	Q	4
India	–	–	3rd	–	8th	9th ▼	–	Q	4
Ireland	–	–	–	–	–	–	9th ▼ (Note: New Zealand withdrew and were replaced by Ireland to the 2025–26 Women's FIH Pro League.)	–	1
Netherlands	1st	1st	2nd	1st	1st	1st	1st	Q	8
New Zealand	6th	6th	WD	8th	WD (Note: New Zealand withdrew and were replaced by United States to the 2023–24 Women's FIH Pro League.)	–	WD	–	3
Spain	–	–	5th	–	–	6th	6th	Q	4
United States	9th	9th	9th	9th▼	9th ▼	–	–	–	5
Total	9	9	9	9	9	9	9	9	

== See also ==
- Men's FIH Pro League
- FIH Hockey Series
- Women's FIH Hockey Nations Cup
- Women's FIH Hockey World League
