= 2026–27 Women's FIH Pro League squads =

This article lists the squads of all participating teams in the 2026–27 Women's FIH Pro League.

== Argentina ==
The following is the Argentina squad for the 2026–27 FIH Pro League.

Head coach: Fernando Ferrara

2. Sofía Toccalino
3. Agustina Gorzelany
4. Valentina Raposo
5. Agostina Alonso (C)
7. Lourdes Pisthón
10. María José Granatto (C)
11. Brisa Bruggesser
13. Cristina Cosentino (GK)
14. Victoria Falasco
15. Ana Luz Dodorico (GK)
18. Victoria Sauze
20. Sofía Cairó
21. Victoria Granatto
22. Eugenia Trinchinetti
23. Lara Casas
24. Sol Lombardo
25. Juana Castellaro
26. María Ortiz
27. Sol Pagella
28. Julieta Jankunas
29. Victoria Miranda
30. Paula Santamarina
32. Mercedes Artola (GK)
33. Zoe Díaz
35. Rocío Bianchi
38. Chiara Ambrosini
40. María di Santo
41. Maxima Duportal
42. Juliana Guggini
43. Emma Knobl
44. Trinidad Holmgren
45. Catalina Andrade
46. Delfina Persoglia
47. Pilar Palacio
49. Sol Guignet
55. Pilar Pisthón
64. Milagros Alastra

== Australia ==
The following is the Australia squad for the 2026–27 FIH Pro League.

Head coach: (South Africa) Rhett Halkett

1. Claire Colwill (C)
2. Casey Dolkens
3. Morgan Mathison
4. Amy Lawton
5. Grace Young
6. Sarah Byrnes
7. Aleisha Power (GK)
8. Maddison Brooks
9. Maddison Smith
11. Alice Arnott
14. Stephanie Kershaw
15. Kaitlin Nobbs (C)
16. Courtney Schonell
17. Lucy Sharman
20. Karri Somerville
21. Jade Smith
23. Olivia Downes
24. Mariah Williams
25. Zoe Newman (GK)
26. Lexie Pickering
30. Grace Stewart (C)
31. Neasa Flynn
33. Camryn Mathison
36. Dayle Dolkens
37. Karissa van der Wath
38. Jolie Sertorio
39. Mihaylia Howell
40. Phillipa Morgan
41. Georgie Smithers
43. Georgina West
45. Jesse Reid
46. Kara Bradley
48. Summer Greenway (GK)
49. Bianca Zurrer
50. Charlotte Hodgson
51. Georgia Hiskins
52. Sophie Davis
53. Lola Dorman
54. Aurora Kovacevich
55. Jordan Bliss (GK)
56. Belle' Ramshaw
57. Katie Sharkey
58. Amalia Patterson
59. Annie Gibbs
60. Alyssa Smith (GK)
61. Lahni Woodger
62. Evie Stansby
63. Kendra Fitzpatrick
64. Jamie-Lee Surha

== Belgium ==
The following is the Belgium squad for the 2026–27 FIH Pro League.

Head coach: (Australia) Adam Commens

3. Justine Rasir
4. Delphine Marien
6. Charlotte Englebert (C)
7. Judith Vandermeiren
8. Emma Puvrez
9. Emily White
11. Perrine de Clerck
12. Emilie Verhees
14. Alix Marien
15. Vanessa Blockmans
16. Agathe Favart
17. Michelle Struijk
18. Felicia Theunissen
19. Hélène Brasseur
20. Alexi van Remortel
22. Stéphanie Vanden Borre
23. Elena Sotgiu (GK)
24. Fee van den Abeele
25. Anne-Sophie Vanden Borre
26. Lien Hillewaert
28. Lisa Moors
29. Elodie Picard (GK)
30. Ambre Ballenghien
32. Louise Dewaet
33. Maitë Bussels (GK)
37. Maude Dewelde (GK)
40. Camille Belis
41. Astrid Bonami
48. Alison Smisdom
77. Famke van Heel

== China ==
The following is the China squad for the 2026–27 FIH Pro League.

Head coach: Huang Yongsheng

3. Yang Liu
4. Huang Siting
6. Zhang Ying (C)
9. Ma Ning
12. Huang Haiyan
15. Wang Lihang
19. Yu Anhui
21. Fu Fengzhen
23. Fan Yunxia
24. Xu Yanan
28. Wang Yangyang
30. Ouyang Huarui (GK)
31. Ge Chen
34. Zeng Xueling
35. Tan Jinzhuang
43. Yang Yiting
50. Li Ting (GK)
52. Wu Zhangting
57. Li Jingyi
58. Sun Yao
62. Wu Surong (GK)
63. Ming Siyu
64. Luo Yaxi
65. Liu Jinming
67. Qi Chenchen
70. Wei Qingqing
77. Nie Yushuo
81. Ni Yanling

== Germany ==
The following is the Germany squad for the 2026–27 FIH Pro League.

Head coach: Markus Lonnes

2. Jule Bleuel
4. Lena Frerichs
6. Friederike Heusgen
7. Linnea Weidemann (C)
8. Sophia Schwabe
10. Lisa Nolte (C)
12. Ines Wanner
14. Lucina von der Heyde
15. Nathalie Hessler (GK)
16. Sonja Zimmermann
17. Lynn Krings
18. Lilly Stoffelsma
19. Finja Starck (GK)
21. Sara Strauss
22. Aina Kresken
23. Emma Davidsmeyer
25. Johanna Hachenberg
26. Felicia Wiedermann
27. Stine Kurz
28. Jette Fleschütz
29. Philin Bolle
30. Paula Nahr
31. Philine Drumm
32. Lisa Höllriegl
33. Julia Hemmerle
36. Ida-Marie Köllinger
38. Luzie Franz
39. Carolin Seidel
42. Nika Hansen
44. Taja Gans
47. Klara Batschko (GK)
48. Joana Böhringer
55. Emilia Landshut
66. Katharina Haid
71. Yara Mandel
77. Yani Zhong

== Great Britain ==
The following is the Great Britain squad for the 2026–27 FIH Pro League.

Head coach: Jon Bleby

2. Darcy Bourne
3. Rebecca Manton
4. Lily Walker (C)
5. Alexandra Malzer
6. Anna Toman
7. Hannah French
8. Pippa Lock
9. Amy Costello
10. Amy Thompson
12. Charlotte Watson
14. Tessa Howard
15. Mila Welch (GK)
16. Isabelle Petter
17. Georgina Gardens
18. Katharine Curtis
19. Olivia Hamilton
21. Fiona Crackles
22. Elizabeth Neal
23. Sophie Hamilton
25. Sabrina Heesh (GK)
26. Lily Owsley
28. Flora Peel (C)
30. Martha Taylor
31. Grace Balsdon
32. Jessica Buchanan (GK)
34. Millie Holme
35. Ellie Mackenzie
39. Alice Atkinson
40. Miriam Pritchard (GK)
42. Rebecca Daniel
44. Charlotte Bingham
46. Olivia Breed
47. Amy Cradden
48. Hollie Dring-Richardson
49. Sienna Dunn
50. Ava Findlay
51. Beth Gardens
52. Evie Grindal
53. Zara Kennedy
54. Biba Mills
55. Mia Moore
56. Caterina Nelli
57. Elizabeth Pocknell
58. Freya Robinson
59. Connie Roxburgh
60. Molly Smith (GK)
61. Ava Wadsworth
62. Caitlin Witham
64. Isabelle Yonge
71. Betsan Thomas

== India ==
The following is the India squad for the 2026–27 FIH Pro League.

Head coach: (Netherlands) Sjoerd Marijne

2. Jyoti Singh
6. Ishika Chaudhary
8. Nikki Pradhan
9. Bichu Devi Kharibam (GK)
10. Bansari Solanki (GK)
11. Savita Punia (GK)
12. Shilpi Dabas
15. Mumtaz Khan
20. Lalremsiami Hmarzote
21. Deepika Soreng
22. Baljeet Kaur
23. Ishika
24. Jyoti Rumavat
27. Navneet Kaur
29. Sushila Chanu
30. Sunelita Toppo
32. Salima Tete (C)
35. Neha Goyal
37. Rutuja Pisal
39. Lalthantluangi
40. Sakshi Rana
52. Puja Sahoo
55. Beauty Dungdung
56. Deepika Sehrawat

== Netherlands ==
The following is the Netherlands squad for the 2026–27 FIH Pro League.

Head coach: Raoul Ehren

1. Anne Veenendaal (GK)
3. Rosa Fernig
4. Fay van der Elst
5. Lisa Post
6. Daantje de Kruijff
8. Yibbi Jansen
9. Renée van Laarhoven
10. Felice Albers
12. Luna Fokke
14. Sanne Koolen
15. Joosje Burg
16. Marleen Jochems
17. Freeke Moes
18. Marijn Veen (C)
21. Pien Dicke
22. Josine Koning (GK)
23. Jip Dicke
24. Emma Reijnen
25. Noor van den Nieuwenhof
26. Maud van den Heuvel
28. Trijntje Beljaars
30. Babette Backers (GK)
32. Imke Verstraeten
34. Eline Jansen
36. Danique van der Veerdonk
37. Guusje Moes
38. Bente van der Veldt
39. Mikki Roberts
40. Phileine Hazen (GK)
41. Iris de Kemp
42. Mea de Vries
43. Dymph Luttge
44. Noa Muller
45. Babs Reijnen
46. Lotte Ruts
47. Brechtje van Santbrink
48. Lynn Vasterink
49. Fleur Wolfert

== Spain ==
The following is the Spain squad for the 2026–27 FIH Pro League.

Head coach: Carlos García Cuenca

2. Laura Bruguera (GK)
4. Laura Bosch
5. Berta Serrahima
6. Clara Badia
7. Florencia Teves
8. Lucía Jiménez (C)
9. Teresa Lima
10. Patricia Álvarez
11. Marta Segú
13. Constanza Teves
14. Blanca Pérez
16. Candela Mejías
18. Berta Agulló
19. Mireia Herrero
20. Xantal Giné (C)
22. Laia Vidosa
23. Carmen Fernández
24. Estel Petchamé
25. Ivet Marti
26. Clara Pérez (GK)
27. Paula Fernández
28. María Tello (GK)
29. Paula Jiménez
30. Sofía Rogoski
31. Sofía Keenan
