= 2023 Women's FIH Hockey Junior World Cup squads =

Women's Hockey Junior World Cup tournament

This article lists the confirmed squads for the 2023 FIH Junior World Cup tournament to be held in Santiago, Chile from 29 November to 10 December 2023.

== Pool A ==
=== Australia ===
The squad was announced on 19 October 2023.

Head coach: Stacia Strain

1. Hannah Cullum-Sanders
2. Grace Young
3. Maddison Brooks
4. Karissa van der Wath
5. Claire Colwill (C)
6. Madeline Kenny
7. Makayla Jones
8. Alana Kavanagh
9. Amy Lawton
10. Josie Lawton
12. Emily Hamilton-Smith
13. Jade Reid
17. Lucy Sharman
18. Katie Sharkey
21. Lily Neilson
22. Tatum Stewart
26. Jordan Bliss (GK)
27. Bridget Laurance (GK)

=== Chile ===
Head coach: Alejandro Gómez

21. Francisca Irazoqui (C)
26. Monserrat Obon
40. María Goñi
42. Alejandra Mujíca
43. Josefina Ríos
45. Victoria Arrieta
47. Laura Müller
48. Laura Salamanca
51. Isidora Caravia
52. Monserrat Orellana
53. Constanza Pérez
55. Josefina Martínez
57. Montserrat Araya (GK)
58. Florencia Barrios
61. Emilia Molin (GK)
66. Constanza Muñoz
77. Milagros Gago
80. Dominga Valdés
88. Martina Gago
91. Josefina Gutiérrez

=== Netherlands ===
The squad was announced on 25 October 2023.

Head coach: Dave Smolenaars

1. Sophia ter Kuile (GK)
2. Pam van der Laan
3. Guusje Moes
7. Noor van den Nieuwenhof
9. Trijntje Beljaars
10. Jip Dicke
11. Sam Luttmer
12. Daantje de Kruijff (C)
13. Babette Backers (GK)
14. Isis van Loon
15. Lilli de Nooijer
16. Imke Verstraeten
17. Eline Jansen
18. Mette Winter
19. Emma Reijnen
20. Alessia Norbiato
21. Lotte Beetsma
22. Mikki Roberts

=== South Africa ===
The squad was announced on 27 September 2023.

Head coach: Lenise Marais

1. Morgan de Jager (GK)
2. Daniella de Oliveira
3. Shanna Mendonça
4. Laikén Brisset
5. Tatum Kroutz
6. Katlego Bodibe
7. Taheera Augousti
8. Cerian Fourie
9. Caylin Maree (C)
10. Ané Janse van Vuuren
11. Reabetswe Phume
12. Kayla Swarts
13. Jenna Blaauw
14. Germarie Spershott
15. Paris-Gail Isaacs
16. Malikah Hamza
17. Ntsopa Mokoena
18. Leané McLaren (GK)

== Pool B ==
=== Argentina ===
The squad was announced on 26 October 2023.

Head coach: Juan Martín López

1. Yazmin Pallotini (GK)
2. Juana Castellaro
3. Valentina Ferola
4. Valentina Raposo (C)
6. Brisa Ruggeri
8. Sofía Cairó
9. Lara Casas
10. Brisa Bruggesser
11. Pilar Palacio
14. Daiana Pacheco
16. Sol Pagella
17. Paula Santamarina
18. Catalina Andrade
20. Victoria Falasco
22. Zoe Díaz
23. Pilar Pisthon
25. Malena Sabez
32. Mercedes Artola (GK)

=== South Korea ===
Head coach: Kim Seong Eun

1. Lee Seo-yeon (GK)
2. Choi Sara
4. Hong Solbeotnara
6. Jang Suan
7. Park Yeong-eun
8. An Su-jin
9. Park Seo-yeon
10. Lee Seo-yeon
11. Lee Yu-jin (C)
12. Kim Gyeong-ju
13. Park Mi-hyang
15. Song Sung-eun
16. Cheon Su-min (GK)
17. Jeong Sa-ena
20. Choi Nu-rim
21. Gwon Ju-gyeong
22. Park Mi-gyeong
25. Choi Ji-yun

=== Spain ===
Head coach: María del Mar Feito

1. Cristina Torres (GK)
2. Mar Sola
5. Jone Alba
6. Teresa Lima
7. Paula Fernández
8. Clara Barba
9. Sara Carmona
10. Teresa Sáenz de Santa María
11. Blanca Pérez
12. Carmen Fernández
13. Esther Canales
14. Anna Garsjord
15. Jana Martínez (GK)
16. Ana Bousquet (C)
17. Meritxell Vizcaino
18. Nerea Melero
19. Paula Jiménez
22. Mireia Herrero

=== Zimbabwe ===
The squad was announced on 17 July 2023.

Head coach: Bradley Heuer

1. Tanatswa Mutaramutswa (GK)
2. Tanyaradzwa Changa
3. Rumbidzaishe Zimuto
4. Emma Reilly
5. Hayley Clark
6. Jorja Jones (C)
7. Athina Mujiba
9. Ella Allardice
10. Kaylee Sithole
11. Nakai Mujaranji (VC)
12. Tyla Falkenberg
13. Tinodiwanashe Elijah
15. Khanyisile Mzizi
16. Chelsey-Lee Hares
17. Tumi Sibanda
18. Bethel Chidzwondo (GK)
22. Tatenda Maswera
23. Amber Tozana

== Pool C ==
=== Belgium ===
The squad was announced on 24 October 2023.

Head coach: (Australia) Darran Bisley

1. Maïté Bussels (GK)
4. Astrid Bonami
5. Noa de Kerchove
6. Loes Palfliet
8. Chloé Delhalle
9. Marthe-Marie Geerts
11. Perrine de Clerck
12. Lauren Maertens
13. Lisa Moors
14. Alix Marien
15. Eva Goffinet
16. Noa Schreurs
19. Emma Plets
20. France de Mot
21. Nael Goeminne (C)
22. Louise Dewaet
23. Maura Cornelissens
25. Marie Royakkers (GK)

=== Canada ===
The squad was announced on 6 October 2023.

Head coach: Jenn Beagan

2. Nicole Poulakis
3. Julia Boraston
4. Katherine Gibb
5. Libby Hogg
7. Elizabeth Mathisen
8. Madeline Skeans
9. Laine Delmotte
10. Isabella Green
12. Molly Koop
13. Allison Kuzyk (C)
15. Calista Schwartz
16. Imogen Govan
17. Kaitlyn Pennefather
18. Stella Malinowski
27. Emily Chisholm
29. Mallory Mackesy
30. Kayla Desormeau (GK)
75. Abby Danson (GK)

=== Germany ===
Head coach: Akim Bouchouchi

1. Chiara Vischer (GK)
2. Mia Böhringer (GK)
3. Laura Plüth
5. Paula Nahr
6. Katharina Haid
9. Jule Fischer
10. Julia Hemmerle
11. Carolin Seidel
12. Joana Böhringer
13. Marie Fischer
15. Paula Schröder
18. Sophia Schwabe
19. Lilly Stoffelsma (C)
21. Mia Montag
22. Taja Gans
23. Cara Sambeth
28. Friederike Heusgen
30. Klara Batschko (GK)

=== India ===
The squad was announced on 9 November 2023.

Head coach: Tushar Khandker

1. Jyoti Chhatri
4. Preeti (C)
5. Sujata Kujur
8. Annu
9. Mumtaz Khan
10. Jyoti Singh
11. Khushboo Khan (GK)
15. Dipi Monika Toppo
18. Rutaja Pisal
20. Deepika Soreng
21. Hina Bano
26. Madhuri Kindo (GK)
27. Manju Chaurasia
28. Mahima Tete
29. Sunelita Toppo
33. Neelam Panghal
34. Ropni Kumari
35. Sakshi Rana

== Pool D ==
=== England ===
The squad was announced on 2 November 2023.

Head coach: Simon Letchford

6. Sienna Dunn
7. Alice Atkinson
8. Evie Wood (GK, C)
9. Sofia Martin
10. Scarlett Spavin
11. Ella Burnley
12. Claudia Swain
14. Katharine Curtis
15. Hollie Dring-Richardson
16. Matilda Butterworth
17. Georgina Gardens
18. Elizabeth Pocknell
19. Madeleine Axford
20. Madeleine Long
21. Bethan Alexander (C)
24. Martha Le Huray
25. Charlotte Bingham
28. Molly Smith (GK)

=== Japan ===
The squad was announced on 28 September 2023.

Head coach: Kazunori Kobayashi

1. Misaki Saito (GK)
2. Maiko Mikami
3. Maho Ueno
4. Mayuri Horikawa
5. Wakana Kondo
6. Saya Iwasaki
7. Hiroka Murayama
8. Sora Suzuki
9. Mao Kitayama
10. Natsumi Oshima
11. Haruka Kawaguchi
12. Mizuki Morita (GK)
13. Mimiami Otsuka
14. Mai Wakasa
15. Risa Sasaki
16. Mei Matsunami
17. Hanami Saito
18. Ai Hiramatsu
19. Rei Yoshida
20. Sana Hayasuke

=== New Zealand ===
The squad was announced on 12 September 2023.

Head coach: Mitchell Hayde

1. Rebecca Baker
2. Emma Findlay
3. Rosanna Bedford
4. Annabelle Schneidmann
5. Riana Pho
6. Isabella Storey
7. Leah Hodges
8. Hannah Cotter (C)
9. Paige Blake
10. Madeline Harris
11. Emma Irwin
12. Tessa Reid
13. Emilie Logan
14. Lucy Russ
15. Jaimee Eades
16. Katherine Winter
17. Arabella Loveridge (GK)
18. Brodie Cochrane (GK)

=== United States ===
The squad was announced on 4 August 2023.

Head coach: Tracey Paul

1. Abigail Tamer
2. Jans Croon
4. Lucy Adams
5. Olivia Bent-Cole
6. Madison Orsi
7. Katie Dixon (C)
8. Daniela Mendez-Trendler
9. Kiersten Thomassey
10. Lauren Wadas (C)
11. Reagan Underwood
13. Rayne Wright
14. Charlotte Bruder
19. Josie Hollamon
26. Hope Rose
28. Mia Abello
33. Ryleigh Heck
98. Annabel Skubisz (GK)
99. Eleanor Todd (GK)
