= 2025–26 Women's FIH Pro League squads =

This article lists the squads of all participating teams in the 2025–26 Women's FIH Pro League.

== Argentina ==
The following is the Argentina squad for the 2025–26 FIH Pro League.

Head coach: Fernando Ferrara

2. Sofía Toccalino
3. Agustina Gorzelany
4. Valentina Raposo
5. Agostina Alonso (C)
10. María José Granatto (C)
13. Cristina Cosentino (GK)
15. Ana Luz Dodorico (GK)
18. Victoria Sauze
20. Sofía Cairó
21. Victoria Granatto
22. Eugenia Trinchinetti
23. Lara Casas
25. Juana Castellaro
28. Julieta Jankunas
29. Victoria Miranda
30. Paula Santamarina
32. Valentina Costa Biondi
33. Zoe Díaz
34. Catalina Alimenti
35. Valentina Ferola
36. Stefanía Antoniazzi
38. Chiara Ambrosini
39. Ariana Arias
40. Mercedes Artola (GK)
41. Candela Esandi
42. Victoria Falasco
43. Emma Knobl
44. Sol Lombardo
45. Catalina Andrade
46. Lourdes Pisthón
47. Julieta Arcidiácono
48. Lourdes Pérez Iturraspe (GK)
50. María Larsen
51. Paula Ortiz
52. Aylin Ovejero
53. Brisa Ruggeri
60. Brisa Bruggesser
64. Milagros Alastra

== Australia ==
The following is the Australia squad for the 2025–26 FIH Pro League.

Head coach: (South Africa) Rhett Halkett

1. Claire Colwill (C)
2. Casey Dolkens
3. Morgan Mathison
4. Amy Lawton
5. Grace Young
6. Sarah Byrnes
7. Aleisha Power (GK)
8. Maddison Brooks
9. Maddison Smith
10. Abigail Wilson
11. Alice Arnott
12. Greta Hayes
13. Makayla Jones
14. Stephanie Kershaw
15. Kaitlin Nobbs (C)
16. Courtney Schonell
17. Lucy Sharman
18. Alana Kavanagh
19. Jocelyn Bartram (GK)
20. Karri Somerville
21. Jade Smith
22. Tatum Stewart
23. Olivia Downes
24. Mariah Williams
25. Zoe Newman (GK)
26. Lexie Pickering
28. Hannah Cullum-Sanders
29. Rebecca Greiner
30. Grace Stewart (C)
31. Neasa Flynn
33. Camryn Mathison
35. Sophie Murphy
38. Jolie Sertorio
39. Mihaylia Howell
40. Georgie Smithers
41. Zali Ward
43. Georgina West
45. Jesse Reid
47. Bridget Laurance (GK)
52. Dayle Dolkens
60. Alyssa Smith (GK)
73. Karissa van der Wath
78. Jamie-Lee Surha
79. Caitlyn Templeman
80. Phillipa Morgan

== Belgium ==
The following is the Belgium squad for the 2025–26 FIH Pro League.

Head coach: Rein van Eijk

3. Justine Rasir
4. Delphine Mariën
6. Charlotte Englebert (C)
7. Judith Vandermeiren
8. Emma Puvrez
9. Emily White
11. Perrine de Clerck
12. Emilie Verhees
13. Alix Gerniers (C)
14. Alix Mariën
15. Vanessa Blockmans
16. Agathe Favart
17. Michelle Struijk (C)
18. Felicia Theunissen
19. Hélène Brasseur
20. Alexi van Remortel
22. Stéphanie Vanden Borre
23. Elena Sotgiu (GK)
24. Noa Schreurs
25. Anne-Sophie Vanden Borre
26. Lien Hillewaert
27. Loes Palfliet
28. Lisa Moors
29. Elodie Picard (GK)
30. Ambre Ballenghien
31. Lucie Breyne
32. Louise Dewaet
33. Maïté Bussels (GK)
34. Emma Plets
35. Chloé Delhalle
36. Fleur Verboven
37. Maud Dewelde (GK)
40. Camille Belis
41. Astrid Bonami
42. Louise van Hecke
43. Maura Cornelissens
45. Marthe-Marie Geerts
46. Fee van den Abeele
50. Fien Stockbroekx
51. Lisl Denef
52. Marie Gelders
77. Famke van Heel

== China ==
The following is the China squad for the 2025–26 FIH Pro League.

Head coach: (Australia) Alyson Annan

3. Yang Liu
6. Zhang Ying
7. Chen Yi
8. Gu Yangyan
9. Ma Ning
10. Zhong Jiaqi
11. Dan Wen
12. Huang Haiyan
13. Li Hong
14. Zhang Heyang
16. Ou Zixia (C)
18. Zou Meirong
20. He Jiangxin
23. Fan Yunxia
24. Xu Yanan
26. Chen Yang
27. Xu Wenyu
29. Liu Ping (GK)
30. Li Xinhuan (GK)
33. Zhang Dian
34. Zeng Xueling
35. Tan Jinzhuang
36. Liu Chencheng
43. Yang Yiting
45. Zhang Wenli
46. Cai Wenqian
49. Liang Weizhi
51. Liu Hua
53. Chen Tong
54. Liu Tangjie
55. Chen Yujun
56. Hao Guoting
58. Yu Anhui
59. Deng Qiuchan
62. Wu Surong (GK)
63. Wang Lihang
64. Luo Yaxi
66. Feng Qingmiao
70. Wei Qingqing
77. Nie Yushuo
78. Wei Qixiao

== England ==
The following is the England squad for the 2025–26 FIH Pro League.

Head coach: (Scotland) David Ralph

2. Darcy Bourne
3. Rebecca Manton
4. Lily Walker (C)
5. Alexandra Malzer
6. Anna Toman
7. Hannah French
8. Pippa Lock
10. Amy Thompson
11. Holly Hunt
13. Elena Rayer
14. Tessa Howard
15. Mila Welch (GK)
17. Georgina Gardens
18. Katharine Curtis
19. Olivia Hamilton
21. Fiona Crackles
22. Elizabeth Neal
23. Sophie Hamilton
24. Madeleine Axford
25. Sabrina Heesh (GK)
26. Lily Owsley
28. Flora Peel (C)
30. Martha Taylor
31. Grace Balsdon
34. Paige Gillott
39. Alice Atkinson
40. Miriam Pritchard (GK)
43. Evie Wood (GK)
44. Charlotte Bingham
46. Molly Smith (GK)
47. Olivia Breed

== Germany ==
The following is the Germany squad for the 2025–26 FIH Pro League.

Head coach: (Netherlands) Janneke Schopman

2. Jule Bleuel
4. Lena Frerichs
7. Linnea Weidemann (C)
8. Sophia Schwabe
10. Lisa Nolte (C)
11. Lena Micheel
12. Ines Wanner
13. Hanna Rothländer
14. Lucina von der Heyde
15. Nathalie Kubalski (GK)
16. Sonja Zimmermann
17. Lynn Krings
18. Lilly Stoffelsma
19. Finja Starck (GK)
21. Sara Strauss
22. Aina Kresken
23. Emma Davidsmeyer
25. Johanna Hachenberg
26. Felicia Wiedermann
27. Stine Kurz
28. Jette Fleschütz
29. Philin Bolle
32. Chiara Vischer (GK)
33. Julia Hemmerle
34. Laura Plüth
36. Ida-Marie Köllinger
37. Annika Schönhoff
40. Mali Wichmann (GK)
42. Charlotte Gerstenhöfer
44. Taja Gans
55. Emilia Landshut
66. Katharina Haid
71. Yara Mandel
77. Yani Zhong

== Ireland ==
The following is the Ireland squad for the 2025–26 FIH Pro League.

Head coach: Gareth Grundie

1. Ayeisha McFerran (GK)
2. Elizabeth Murphy (GK)
3. Sarah McAuley
5. Michelle Carey
6. Róisín Upton
7. Niamh Carey
8. Sarah Hawkshaw (C)
9. Kathryn Mullan
10. Hannah McLoughlin
11. Sarah Torrans
12. Elena Neill
14. Ellen Curran
15. Caoimhe Perdue
16. Charlotte Beggs
17. Christina Hamill
18. Caitlin Sherin
20. Niamh Gowing
21. Katie McKee
22. Beth Harper
23. Holly Micklem (GK)
24. Aoife Glennon (GK)
26. Amy Handcock
27. Jessica McMaster
28. Katie Larmour
29. Mikayla Power
30. Emily Kealy
31. Mia Jennings
32. Rebecca Spence
33. Lisa Mulcahy
34. Milla Fulton
35. Sarah Byrne
36. Sophia Cole
37. Eva Gaston
38. Anna Horan
39. Mollie Lennon
40. Leah O'Shea
41. Emma Quinn
42. Hollai Quinn
43. Gabriella Scott

== Netherlands ==
The following is the Netherlands squad for the 2025–26 FIH Pro League.

Head coach: Raoul Ehren

1. Anne Veenendaal (GK)
3. Rosa Fernig
5. Lisa Post
7. Xan de Waard
8. Yibbi Jansen
9. Renée van Laarhoven (C)
10. Felice Albers
11. Pien Sanders (C)
12. Luna Fokke
13. Sanne Koolen
15. Frédérique Matla
16. Joosje Burg
17. Marleen Jochems
18. Freeke Moes
19. Marijn Veen
21. Pien Dicke
22. Josine Koning (GK)
23. Jip Dicke
25. Noor van den Nieuwenhof
26. Maud van den Heuvel
27. Daantje de Kruijff
28. Trijntje Beljaars
29. Fay van der Elst
30. Babette Backers (GK)
31. Maria Steensma
34. Eline Jansen
35. Pam van der Laan
36. Danique van der Veerdonk
37. Guusje Moes

== Spain ==
The following is the Spain squad for the 2025–26 FIH Pro League.

Head coach: Carlos García Cuenca

2. Laura Bruguera
4. Laura Bosch
5. Berta Serrahima
6. Clara Badia
7. Florencia Amundson
8. Lucía Jiménez (C)
9. Teresa Lima
10. Patricia Álvarez
11. Marta Segú (C)
13. Constanza Amundson
14. Blanca Pérez
15. María Gestí
16. Candela Mejías
17. Luciana Molina
18. Berta Agulló
19. Mireia Herrero
20. Xantal Giné (C)
21. Jone Alba
22. Laia Vidosa
23. Carmen Fernández
24. Estel Petchamé
25. Ivet Marti
26. Clara Pérez (GK)
27. Paula Fernández
28. María Tello (GK)
29. Paula Jiménez
30. Sofía Rogoski
31. Sofía Keenan
32. Mireia Gifra
33. Núria Giménez (GK)
34. Lidia Paniagua (GK)
