= 2023 Girls' EuroHockey U18 Championship =

Tournament details
- Host country: Germany
- City: Krefeld
- Dates: 8–16 July
- Teams: 9 (from 1 confederation)
- Venue(s): Crefelder Hockey and Tennis Club 1890

Final positions
- Champions: Germany (4th title)
- Runner-up: Belgium
- Third place: Spain

Tournament statistics
- Matches played: 23
- Goals scored: 85 (3.7 per match)
- Top scorer: (Netherlands) Anouk Brouwer (4 goals)
- Best player: (Belgium) Lisa Moors
- Best goalkeeper: (Germany) Klara Batschko

The 2023 Girl's EuroHockey U18 Championship was the 12th edition of the Girls' EuroHockey U18 Championship, the biennial international women's under-18 field hockey championship of Europe organized by the European Hockey Federation. It was held alongside the boys'tournament from 8 to 16 July 2023 at the Crefelder Hockey and Tennis Club 1890 in Krefeld, Germany.

The hosts and defending champions Germany won their fourth title by defeating Belgium 3–2 in a shoot-out after the final finished 0–0. Spain won the bronze medal by defeating England 1–0.

== Qualified teams ==
Dates	Event	Location	Quotas	Qualifier(s)
19–24 July 2021	2021 EuroHockey U18 Championship	Valencia, Spain	7	Belgium; England; Germany; Ireland; Netherlands; ~~Russia~~ (Note: Russia were excluded from the tournament due to their involvement in the 2022 Russian invasion of Ukraine.); Scotland; Spain
18–24 July 2021	2021 EuroHockey U18 Championship II	Zürich, Switzerland	2	Austria; France
Total			9	

== Format ==
The nine teams were split into two groups of five and four teams. The top two teams advanced to the semi-finals to determine the winner in a knockout system. The bottom two teams of each pool competed for a spot in the 7th place game, whilst the fourth-placed team in pool A automatically moved onto this game. The third placed teams in each pool competed for the 5th place. The last three teams were relegated to the U18 Championship II.

== Preliminary round ==
All times are local (UTC+2).

=== Pool A ===
Pos	Team	Pld	W	D	L	GF	GA	GD	Pts	Qualification or relegation
1	Belgium	4	3	1	0	13	2	+11	10	Qualification for the semi-finals
2	Germany (H)	4	3	1	0	11	1	+10	10	Qualification for the semi-finals
3	France	4	1	1	2	4	12	−8	4	
4	Ireland (R)	4	1	0	3	5	11	−6	3	Relegation to the U18 Championship II
5	Scotland (R)	4	0	1	3	3	10	−7	1	Relegation to the U18 Championship II

Source: EHF
Rules for classification: 1) points; 2) matches won; 3) goal difference; 4) goals for; 5) head-to-head result; 6) field goals for.
(H) Hosts; (R) Relegated

8 July 2023
12:15

Belgium	3–1	Scotland
Delva 21'; Bertram 49'; Moors 56'	Report	Nelli 4'

Umpires:
Francesc Tormo (ESP)
Miriam Gerö (AUT)

8 July 2023
16:45

France	3–1	Ireland
Delemazure 10'; Le Nindre 54'; Samaté 60'	Report	Fulton 60'

Umpires:
Lewis White (SCO)
Zoe Hall (ENG)

9 July 2023
13:45

Belgium	5–1	Ireland
Palfliet 7'; Delva 24' van Hecke 40'; Denef 44'; Dewaet 52'	Report	Carthy 5'

Umpires:
Amar Chudasama (ENG)
Clare Barwood (WAL)

9 July 2023
18:30

Germany	4–0	Scotland
Keller 14', 17'; Boehringer 19'; Heusgen 49'	Report

Umpires:
Pauline Cuypers (BEL)
Gary O'Connor (IRL)

10 July 2023
15:30

France	0–5	Germany
	Report	Seifert 21'; Boehringer 32'; Funkel 34'; Hachenberg 50'; Seidel 58'

Umpires:
Bernhard Hajos (AUT)
Kamile Mockaityte (LTU)

11 July 2023
13:30

Ireland	2–1	Scotland
Power 28'; Jerman 29'	Report	Le. MacMillan 33'

Umpires:
Lorijn de Kraker (NED)
Alexandra Pollex (GER)

12 July 2023
13:15

Scotland	1–1	France
Le. Macmillan 53'	Report	Le Nindre 24'

Umpires:
Amy Jones (IRL)
Raphaël Adrien (GER)

12 July 2023
15:30

Belgium	0–0	Germany
	Report

Umpires:
Lorijn de Kraker (NED)
Francesc Tormo (ESP)

13 July 2023
17:45

Germany	2–1	Ireland
Krings 28'; Becker 59'	Report	Power 59'

Umpires:
Amar Chudasama (ENG)
Lorijn de Kraker (NED)

13 July 2023
18:00

France	0–5	Belgium
	Report	Delva 5'; Denef 25', 57' de Clerck 29'; Delhalle 59'

Umpires:
Alexandra Pollex (GER)
Kamile Mockaityte (LTU)

=== Pool B ===
Pos	Team	Pld	W	D	L	GF	GA	GD	Pts	Qualification or relegation
1	Spain	3	2	0	1	12	2	+10	6	Qualification for the semi-finals
2	England	3	2	0	1	11	2	+9	6	Qualification for the semi-finals
3	Netherlands	3	2	0	1	6	1	+5	6	
4	Austria (R)	3	0	0	3	0	24	−24	0	Relegation to the U18 Championship II

Source: EHF
Rules for classification: 1) points; 2) matches won; 3) goal difference; 4) goals for; 5) head-to-head result; 6) field goals for.
(R) Relegated

10 July 2023
11:00

Netherlands	1–0	England
Luttge 42'	Report

Umpires:
Ana Ortega (ESP)
Lucien van der Borght (BEL)

10 July 2023
13:30

Spain	10–0	Austria
Vilanova 4', 47'; Fernández 12'; Armenteras 26'; Marti 33'; Monterrubio 41'; Garcia 51'; Zubizarreta 52', 54'; Perez 57'	Report

Umpires:
Amy Jones (IRL)
Daniël van der Nat (NED)

11 July 2023
11:00

Austria	0–9	England
	Report	Dunn 4', 50'; Cogdell 24'; Bingham 30'; Alexander 33'; Hippe 53'; Rees 56'; Beer 58'; Horlock 58'

Umpires:
Daniël van der Nat (NED)
Ana Ortega (ESP)

11 July 2023
13:15

Netherlands	0–1	Spain
	Report	Fernández 35'

Umpires:
Kevin Roberts (WAL)
Lena McCrae (SCO)

13 July 2023
13:15

Spain	1–2	England
Sáenz de Santa María 40'	Report	Rees 7'; Beer 57'

Umpires:
Clare Barwood (WAL)
Miriam Gerö (AUT)

13 July 2023
13:30

Austria	0–5	Netherlands
	Report	de Kemp 2', 28'; Rodenburg 34'; Luttge 42'; Dominicus 43'

Umpires:
Lena McCrae (SCO)
Lucien van der Borght (BEL)

== Seventh to ninth place classification ==
=== Bracket ===
Cross-over
15 July
Scotland (p.s.o.)	1 (3)
Austria	1 (2)

Seventh place
16 July
Ireland	0
Scotland	2

=== Cross-over ===
15 July 2023
12:30

Scotland	1–1	Austria
Le. MacMillan 57'	Report	P. Proksch 53'
Penalties
Nelli (penalty shoot-out scored); Le. MacMillan (penalty shoot-out scored); Littlefield (penalty shoot-out missed); Lu. MacMillan (penalty shoot-out missed); Wadsworth (penalty shoot-out scored)	3–2	(penalty shoot-out scored) P. Proksch; (penalty shoot-out scored) K. Proksch; (penalty shoot-out missed) Cartellieri; (penalty shoot-out missed) Damm; (penalty shoot-out missed) Heindl

Umpires:
Gary O'Connor (IRL)
Alexandra Pollex (GER)

=== Seventh and eighth place ===
16 July 2023
13:30

Ireland	0–2	Scotland
	Report	Lu. MacMillan 19'; Falconer 40'

Umpires:
Ana Ortega (ESP)
Alexandra Pollex (GER)

== Fifth and sixth place ==
16 July 2023
14:45

France	0–8	Netherlands
	Report	van den Heuvel 1'; Smorenburg 12' van den Broek 13'; Brouwer 26', 31', 39', 48'; Knoop 35'

Umpires:
Clare Barwood (WAL)
Lena McCrae (SCO)

== First to fourth place classification ==
=== Bracket ===
Semi-finals
15 July
Belgium	3
England	1
15 July
Spain	1
Germany	2

Final
14 July
Belgium	0 (2)
Germany (p.s.o.)	0 (3)
Third place
14 July
England	0
Spain	1

=== Semi-finals ===
15 July 2023
14:00

Belgium	3–1	England
Bertram 18'; De Clerck 32', 41'	Report	Moore 35'

Umpires:
Francsec Tormo (ESP)
Ana Ortega (ESP)

15 July 2023
16:15

Spain	1–2	Germany
Sáenz de Santa María 53'	Report	Montag 21'; Krings 55'

Umpires:
Pauline Cuypers (BEL)
Zoe Hall (ENG)

=== Third and fourth place ===
16 July 2023
12:15

England	0–1	Spain
	Report	Armenteras 44'

Umpires:
Amy Jones (IRL)
Kamile Mockaityte (LTU)

=== Final ===
16 July 2023
16:45

Belgium	0–0	Germany
	Report
Penalties
Dewaet (penalty shoot-out scored); Delva (penalty shoot-out missed); Balon-Perin (penalty shoot-out missed); Verschuere (penalty shoot-out scored); Delhalle (penalty shoot-out missed)	2–3	(penalty shoot-out scored) Boehringer; (penalty shoot-out scored) Funkel; (penalty shoot-out scored) Heusgen; (penalty shoot-out missed) Hendrix

Umpires:
Miriam Gerö (AUT)
Lorijn de Kraker (NED)

== Statistics ==
=== Final standings ===
Pos	Team	Relegation
1st place, gold medalist(s)	Germany (C, H)	
2nd place, silver medalist(s)	Belgium	
3rd place, bronze medalist(s)	Spain	
4	England	
5	Netherlands	
6	France	
7	Scotland (R)	U18 Championship II
8	Ireland (R)	U18 Championship II
9	Austria (R)	U18 Championship II

Source: EHF
(C) Champion; (H) Host; (R) Relegated

=== Goalscorers ===
There were 85 goals scored in 23 matches, for an average of 3.7 goals per match.

4 goals

- (Netherlands) Anouk Brouwer

3 goals

- (Belgium) Perrine de Clerck
- (Belgium) Hélène Delva
- (Belgium) Lisl Denef
- (Scotland) Lexie MacMillan

2 goals

- (England) Lily Beer
- (England) Sienna Dunn
- (England) Amelie Rees
- (France) Paola Le Nindre
- (Germany) Julia Boehringer
- (Germany) Lena Keller
- (Germany) Lynn Krings
- (Germany) Friederike Seifert
- (Ireland) Mikayla Power
- (Netherlands) Iris de Kemp
- (Netherlands) Dymph Luttge
- (Netherlands) Julie Smorenburg
- (Spain) Marta Armenteras
- (Spain) Carmen Fernández
- (Spain) Teresa Sáenz de Santa María
- (Spain) Natalia Vilanova
- (Spain) Leire Zubizarreta

1 goal

- (Austria) Philippa Proksch
- (Belgium) Elise Bertram
- (Belgium) Maxine Bertram
- (Belgium) Chloé Delhalle
- (Belgium) Louise Dewaet
- (Belgium) Lisa Moors
- (Belgium) Mien Palfliet
- (Belgium) Louise Van Hecke
- (England) Katie Alexander
- (England) Charlotte Bingham
- (England) Anna Cogdell
- (England) Josefina Hippe
- (England) Star Horlock
- (England) Mia Moore
- (France) Philippine Delemazure
- (France) Emilie Samaté
- (Germany) Katharina Becker
- (Germany) Giulia Funkel
- (Germany) Johanna Hachenberg
- (Germany) Mia Montag
- (Germany) Carolin Seidel
- (Ireland) Rebecca Carthy
- (Ireland) Milla Fulton
- (Ireland) Amelia Jerman
- (Netherlands) Delany van den Broek
- (Netherlands) Iris Dominicus
- (Netherlands) Maud van den Heuvel
- (Netherlands) Noor Knoop
- (Scotland) Cara Falconer
- (Scotland) Lucy Macmillan
- (Scotland) Caterina Nelli
- (Spain) Ines Garcia
- (Spain) Ivet Marti
- (Spain) Daniela Monterrubio
- (Spain) Gabriela Perez

Source: EHF
