= 2024 Women's EuroHockey Indoor Championship =

Regional Indoor women's hockey championship

Tournament details
- Host country: Germany
- City: Berlin
- Dates: 8–11 February
- Teams: 10 (from 1 confederation)
- Venue: Horst Kober Halle

Final positions
- Champions: Germany (17th title)
- Runner-up: Poland
- Third place: Austria

Tournament statistics
- Matches played: 29
- Goals scored: 172 (5.93 per match)
- Top scorer(s): (Turkey) Fatma Songül Gültekin (Ukraine) Karyna Leonova (9 goals)
- Best player: (Spain) Berta Agulló
- Best goalkeeper: (Poland) Marta Kucharska

The 2024 Women's EuroHockey Indoor Championship was the 22nd edition of the Women's EuroHockey Indoor Championship, the biennial international indoor hockey championship of Europe for women organized by the European Hockey Federation.

The tournament was held from 8 to 11 February 2024 at the Horst Kober Halle in Berlin, Germany. This was the first edition with ten teams. The top six teams qualified for the 2025 Women's FIH Indoor Hockey World Cup.

The hosts and defending champions Germany won their 17th title by defeating Poland 3–2 in the final. Austria won the bronze medal by defeating Spain 3–1.

== Qualified teams ==
Participating nations qualified based on their final ranking from the 2022 competition.

Dates	Event	Location	Quotas	Qualifiers
7–10 December 2023	2022 EuroHockey Indoor Championship	Hamburg, Germany	5	Austria; Czech Republic; Germany; ~~Netherlands~~ (Note: The Netherlands withdrew on 29 September 2023 because of the overcrowded international hockey calendar.); Turkey; Ukraine
21–23 January 2022	2022 EuroHockey Indoor Championship II	Ourense, Spain	4	Belgium; Poland; Spain; Switzerland
3–4 December 2022	2022 EuroHockey Indoor Championship III	Bratislava, Slovakia	1	Italy
Total			10	

== Preliminary round ==
All times are local (UTC+1).

=== Pool A ===
Pos	Team	Pld	W	D	L	GF	GA	GD	Pts	Qualification or relegation
1	Germany (H)	4	4	0	0	21	7	+14	12	Qualification for the semi-finals and the 2025 Indoor World Cup
2	Spain	4	3	0	1	18	14	+4	9	Qualification for the semi-finals and the 2025 Indoor World Cup
3	Czechia	4	1	1	2	10	11	−1	4	
4	Belgium	4	1	1	2	12	14	−2	4	
5	Turkey (R)	4	0	0	4	10	25	−15	0	Relegation to the Indoor Championship II

Source: FIH
Rules for classification: 1) points; 2) matches won; 3) goal difference; 4) goals for; 5) head-to-head result; 6) field goals for.
(H) Hosts; (R) Relegated

8 February 2024
12:30

Belgium	4–2	Turkey
Ronquetti 14'; Gose 19', 28'; Barry 40'	Report	Çinar 20'; Gültekin 21'

Umpires:
Abby MacArthur (WAL)
Lizelotte Wolter (NED)

8 February 2024
13:45

Germany	4–2	Spain
Saenger 14'; Gräve 17'; Poppe 21'; Duus 32'	Report	Petchamé 35'; Agulló 40'

Umpires:
Ivona Makar (CRO)
Kamile Mockaitytė (LTU)

8 February 2024
18:30

Czechia	2–3	Spain
Nováková 13'; Lehovcová 18'	Report	Jiménez 8'; Alcaide 20'; Grau 27'

Umpires:
Gemma Jones (ENG)
Ivona Makar (CRO)

8 February 2024
19:45

Germany	7–2	Turkey
Gräve 10'; Martin-Pelegrina 20'; Wanner 24', 40'; Duus 29'; Kiefer 31'; Bolle 37'	Report	Gültekin 1', 37'

Umpires:
Abby MacArthur (WAL)
Kamile Mockaitytė (LTU)

9 February 2024
12:30

Turkey	5–8	Spain
Çinar 9', 13'; Gültekin 12', 23', 39'	Report	Jiménez 1', 4'; Rodríguez 14'; Agulló 19'; Alcaide 33', 34', 36'; Ybarra 38'

Umpires:
Michal Pivko (SVK)
Lizelotte Wolter (NED)

9 February 2024
13:45

Belgium	2–2	Czechia
Ronquetti 5', 30'	Report	Hájková 19', 20'

Umpires:
Ivona Makar (CRO)
Kamile Mockaityte (LTU)

9 February 2024
18:30

Spain	5–3	Belgium
Forte 10'; Agulló 13', 22'; Grau 39', 40'	Report	Ronquetti 22', 40'; Gose 30'

Umpires:
Abby MacArthur (WAL)
Michal Pivko (SVK)

9 February 2024
19:45

Germany	5–0	Czechia
Wanner 8', 17'; Bolle 10', 15', 26'	Report

Umpires:
Gemma Jones (ENG)
Lizelotte Wolter (NED)

10 February 2024
11:30

Czechia	6–1	Turkey
N. Nováková 5', 12'; Duchková 6'; V. Novakova 17'; Hraničková 37', 40'	Report	Çelik 12'

Umpires:
Kamille Mockaityte (LTU)
Michal Pivko (SVK)

10 February 2024
12:45

Belgium	3–5	Germany
Vincent 16'; Rootenberg 19'; Ronquetti 40+'	Report	Gräve 1'; Saenger 13', 15', 30', 37'

Umpires:
Abby MacArthur (WAL)
Ivona Makar (CRO)

=== Pool B ===
Pos	Team	Pld	W	D	L	GF	GA	GD	Pts	Qualification or relegation
1	Poland	4	3	1	0	9	3	+6	10	Qualification for the semi-finals and the 2025 Indoor World Cup
2	Austria	4	2	2	0	9	4	+5	8	Qualification for the semi-finals and the 2025 Indoor World Cup
3	Ukraine	4	2	1	1	12	3	+9	7	
4	Switzerland	4	1	0	3	10	11	−1	3	
5	Italy (R)	4	0	0	4	1	20	−19	0	Relegation to the Indoor Championship II

Source: FIH
Rules for classification: 1) points; 2) matches won; 3) goal difference; 4) goals for; 5) head-to-head result; 6) field goals for.
(R) Relegated

8 February 2024
10:00

Poland	4–1	Switzerland
Skoraszewska 6', 12'; Tatarczuk 9', 22'	Report	Heselhaus 34'

Umpires:
Mark Becholz (NED)
Gemma Jones (ENG)

8 February 2024
11:15

Austria	4–0	Italy
Czech 7'; Kern 10', 15'; Buchta 37'	Report

Umpires:
Michelle Meister (GER)
Ana Ortega (ESP)

8 February 2024
16:00

Ukraine	7–0	Italy
Tanchenko 4', 18'; Leonova 5', 9', 14'; Shokalenko 19'; Popova 40'	Report

Umpires:
Mark Becholz (NED)
Michal Pivko (SVK)

8 February 2024
17:15

Austria	3–2	Switzerland
Felber 10'; Czech 23'; Buchta 34'	Report	Heselhaus 26'; E. Trösch 38'

Umpires:
Ana Ortega (ESP)
Magali Sergeant (BEL)

9 February 2024
10:00

Switzerland	6–0	Italy
Stomps 7'; Zepf 9'; Heselhaus 14', 31', 33'; Weber 37'	Report

Umpires:
Michelle Meister (GER)
Magali Sergeant (BEL)

9 February 2024
11:15

Poland	1–0	Ukraine
Tatarczuk 32'	Report

Umpires:
Gemma Jones (ENG)
Ana Ortega (ESP)

9 February 2024
16:00

Italy	1–3	Poland
di Mauro 32'	Report	Katerla 27'; Slawinska 27'; Tatarczuk 38'

Umpires:
Ana Ortega (ESP)
Magali Sergeant (BEL)

9 February 2024
17:15

Austria	1–1	Ukraine
Czech 23'	Report	Tanchenko 35'

Umpires:
Mark Becholz (NED)
Michelle Meister (GER)

10 February 2024
09:00

Poland	1–1	Austria
Mazur 26'	Report	Pultar 9'

Umpires:
Mark Becholz (NED)
Magali Sergeant (BEL)

10 February 2024
10:15

Ukraine	4–1	Switzerland
Kernoz 10'; Leonova 15'; Shokalenko 18'; Kurovska 36'	Report	Stomps 40'

Umpires:
Michelle Meister (GER)
Lizelotte Wolter (NED)

== Ninth to tenth place classification ==
=== Ninth and tenth place ===
10 February 2024
21:25

Turkey	10–7	Italy
Çinar 1', 13', 17', 20'; Gültekin 12', 32', 35'; Kurt 26'; Erkoç 27'; Kendir 32'	Report	Puglisi 5'; Bormida 6', 32', 34'; Vynohradova 19', 33'; Anania 30'

Umpires:
Lizelotte Wolter (NED)
Mark Becholz (NED)

== Fifth to eighth place classification ==
=== Bracket ===
Crossover
10 January
Czechia	4
Switzerland	0
10 January
Ukraine	1
Belgium	4

Fifth place
11 January
Czechia	2
Belgium	1
Seventh place
11 January
Switzerland	4
Ukraine	8

=== Crossover ===
10 February 2024
15:45

Czechia	4–0	Switzerland
Vorlova 12'; Hájková 25', 39'; Duchková 37'	Report

Umpires:
Magali Sergeant (BEL)
Michal Pivko (SVK)

10 February 2024
17:10

Ukraine	1–4	Belgium
Kernoz 10'	Report	Ronquetti 3'; Delforge 11'; Gose 16', 34'

Umpires:
Ivona Makar (CRO)
Ana Ortega (ESP)

=== Seventh and eighth place ===
11 February 2024
09:30

Switzerland	4–8	Ukraine
Fontana 27'; Trösch 37'; Stomps 38', 39'	Report	Tanchenko 4'; Shyshyna 7', 35', 39'; Rudychenko 9'; Leonova 21', 22', 35'

Umpires:
Mark Becholz (NED)
Kamile Mockaityte (LTU)

=== Fifth and sixth place ===
11 February 2024
11:00

Czechia	2–1	Belgium
Hájková 10'; Kolářová 17'	Report	Ronquetti 33'

Umpires:
Ana Ortega (ESP)
Gemma Jones (ENG)

== First to fourth place classification ==
=== Bracket ===
Semi-finals
10 January
Germany	7
Austria	0
10 January
Poland	2
Spain	1

Final
11 January
Germany	3
Poland	2
Third place
11 January
Austria	3
Spain	1

=== Semi-finals ===
10 February 2024
18:35

Poland	2–1	Spain
Tatarczuk 21'; Slawinska 31'	Report	Petchamé 30'

Umpires:
Michelle Meister (GER)
Kamile Mockaityte (LTU)

10 February 2024
20:00

Germany	7–0	Austria
Duus 8'; Wanner 13', 26'; Bolle 15', 16', 24'; Lhotak 22'	Report

Umpires:
Abby MacArthur (WAL)
Gemma Jones (ENG)

=== Third and fourth place ===
11 February 2024
12:30

Austria	3–1	Spain
Buchta 25'; Felber 33'; Herzog 39'	Report	Petchamé 26'

Umpires:
Abby MacArthur (WAL)
Michelle Meister (GER)

=== Final ===
11 February 2024
14:00

Germany	3–2	Poland
Gräve 15'; Saenger 31', 40+'	Report	Tatarczuk 3', 32'

Umpires:
Ivona Makar (CRO)
Magali Sergeant (BEL)

== Statistics ==
=== Final standings ===
Pos	Team	Qualification or relegation
1st place, gold medalist(s)	Germany (H)	Qualification for the 2025 Indoor World Cup
2nd place, silver medalist(s)	Poland	Qualification for the 2025 Indoor World Cup
3rd place, bronze medalist(s)	Austria	Qualification for the 2025 Indoor World Cup
4	Spain	Qualification for the 2025 Indoor World Cup
5	Czechia	Qualification for the 2025 Indoor World Cup
6	Belgium	Qualification for the 2025 Indoor World Cup
7	Ukraine	
8	Switzerland	
9	Turkey (R)	Relegation to the Indoor Championship II
10	Italy (R)	Relegation to the Indoor Championship II

Source: FIH
(H) Host; (R) Relegated

=== Goalscorers ===
There were 172 goals scored in 29 matches, for an average of 5.93 goals per match.

9 goals

- (Turkey) Fatma Songül Gültekin

8 goals

- (Belgium) Marie Ronquetti

7 goals

- (Czech Republic) Natálie Hájková
- (Germany) Philin Bolle
- (Germany) Laura Saenger
- (Poland) Sandra Tatarczuk
- (Turkey) Perihan Çinar
- (Ukraine) Karyna Leonova

6 goals

- (Germany) Ines Wanner

5 goals

- (Belgium) Daphné Gose
- (Switzerland) Charline Haselhaus

4 goals

- (Germany) Elisa Gräve
- (Spain) Berta Agulló
- (Spain) Sofía Alcaide
- (Switzerland) Sofie Stomps
- (Ukraine) Anna Tanchenko

3 goals

- (Austria) Daria Buchta
- (Austria) Johanna Czech
- (Germany) Tara Duus
- (Italy) Elettra Bormida
- (Spain) Marta Grau
- (Spain) Paula Jiménez
- (Spain) Estel Petchamé
- (Ukraine) Anastasiia Shyshyna

2 goals

- (Austria) Fiona Felber
- (Austria) Laura Kern
- (Czech Republic) Lucie Duchková
- (Czech Republic) Eliška Hraničková
- (Italy) Maryna Vynohradova
- (Poland) Daria Skoraszewska
- (Poland) Paula Sławińska
- (Switzerland) Elena Trösch
- (Ukraine) Yevheniya Kernoz
- (Ukraine) Kateryna Shokalenko

1 goal

- (Austria) Helene Herzog
- (Austria) Marianne Pultar
- (Belgium) Claire Barry
- (Belgium) Laurine Delforge
- (Belgium) Natasha Rootenberg
- (Belgium) Ophelie Vincent
- (Czech Republic) Anna Kolářová
- (Czech Republic) Adéla Lehovcová
- (Czech Republic) Natálie Nováková
- (Czech Republic) Veronika Nováková
- (Czech Republic) Anna Vorlová
- (Germany) Katharina Kiefer
- (Germany) Pia Lhotak
- (Germany) Teresa Martin-Pelegrina
- (Germany) Fenja Poppe
- (Italy) Alessia Anania
- (Italy) Eleonora di Mauro
- (Italy) Sara Puglisi
- (Poland) Amelia Katerla
- (Poland) Dżesika Mazur
- (Spain) Estel Forté
- (Spain) Claudia Rodríguez
- (Spain) Rocío Ybarra
- (Switzerland) Sae Fontana
- (Switzerland) Stephanie Weber
- (Switzerland) Sara Zepf
- (Turkey) Yeter Çelik
- (Turkey) Sila Erkoç
- (Turkey) Zeliha Kendir
- (Turkey) Sude Nur Kurt
- (Ukraine) Olha Kurovska
- (Ukraine) Kateryna Popova
- (Ukraine) Valeriia Rudychenko

Source: FIH

== See also ==
- 2024 Men's EuroHockey Indoor Championship
- 2024 Women's EuroHockey Indoor Championship II
- 2024 Women's EuroHockey Indoor Club Cup
