= 2024 Women's Asian Champions Trophy =

International field hockey tournament in India

Tournament details
- Host country: India
- City: Rajgir
- Dates: 11 November – 20 November
- Teams: 6 (from 1 confederation)
- Venue: Rajgir Sports Complex Hockey Stadium

Final positions
- Champions: India (3rd title)
- Runner-up: China
- Third place: Japan

Tournament statistics
- Matches played: 20
- Goals scored: 86 (4.3 per match)
- Top scorer: (India) Deepika Sehrawat (11 goals)
- Best player: (India) Deepika Sehrawat
- Best young player: (China) Tan Jinzhuang
- Best goalkeeper: (Japan) Yu Kudo

The 2024 Women's Asian Champions Trophy was the eighth edition of the Women's Asian Champions Trophy, a biennial field hockey tournament where the six best Asian women's national teams compete. It was organized by the Asian Hockey Federation. The edition took place in Rajgir, India, from 11 to 20 November 2024. This was the second time, and the second consecutive time India hosted the Women's Asian Champions Trophy.

The hosts India were the defending champions. They defended their title by defeating China 1–0 in the final to win their third title. Japan won the bronze medal by defeating Malaysia 4–1.

== Teams ==
Highlighted are the countries that are participating in the 2024 Women's Asian Champions Trophy. Qualified via FIH rankings Qualified via FIH ranking and as hosts

The top six ranked nations of the Asian Hockey Federation will compete in the tournament.

Country	FIH Ranking	Most Recent Appearance	Best Finish
China	6	2023	Runners-up (2011, 2016)
India	9	2023	Champions (2016, 2023)
Japan	11	2023	Champions (2013, 2021)
Malaysia	23	2023	Third place (2013)
South Korea	15	2023	Champions (2010, 2011, 2018)
Thailand	29	2023	Fourth place (2021)

== Squads ==
Teams were eligible to submit a squad of up to 18 players.

China

Head Coach: Huang Yongsheng

12. Huang Haiyan
15. Xu Wenjuan
21. Zheng Jiali
23. Fan Yunxia (C)
33. Zhang Dian
34. Zeng Xueling
35. Tan Jinzhuang
36. Liu Chencheng
37. Ma Xiaoyan
38. Chen Jiali (C)
39. Xu Yanan
50. Li Ting (GK)
54. Liu Tangjie
56. Hao Guoting
57. Li Jingyi
58. Yu Anhui (C)
59. Deng Qiuchan
61. Ma Xuejiao
62. Wu Surong (GK)
63. Wang Lihang
India

Head Coach: Harendra Singh

7. Sharmila Devi
9. Bichu Devi Kharibam (GK)
11. Savita Punia (GK)
14. Sangita Kumari
18. Udita Duhan
19. Vaishnavi Phalke
20. Lalremsiami Hmarzote
24. Jyoti Rumawat
25. Navneet Kaur
27. Sushila Chanu
29. Sunelita Toppo
30. Salima Tete (C)
32. Neha Goyal
33. Preeti Dubey
45. Manisha Chauhan
50. Ishika Chaudhary
52. Beauty Dungdung
55. Deepika Sehrawat
Japan

Head Coach: Kazuyuki Ozawa

1. Mizuki Morita (GK)
5. Maho Ueno
7. Saya Iwasaki
9. Mayuri Horikawa
10. Mei Matsunami
11. Saho Nagawa
13. Haruka Kawaguchi
15. Hanami Saito
16. Ayana Tamura
17. Shiho Kobayakawa
19. Mai Fukunaga
23. Saki Tanaka (C)
25. Maiko Mikami
29. Natsumi Oshima
32. Junon Kawai
34. Yu Kudo (GK)
36. Miyu Hasegawa
37. Hiroka Murayama
Malaysia

Head Coach: Nasihin Ibrahim

1. Siti Nasir (GK)
2. Zati Muhamad
3. Nurathirah Syamsul
4. Siti Mohd
5. Dayang Abang
6. Zawiatul Hartomo
7. Azmyra Azhairy
8. Juliani Din (C)
9. Thibatharshini James
11. Nur Azhar
13. Nur Mohd
14. Siti Shaikh
15. Nur Che
17. Anith Humaira Baharudin
18. Nur Mohammed
19. Insyirah Effarizal (GK)
20. Fitrinur Ramlee
24. Nurul Azman
25. Khairunnisa Mohd
27. Nurmaizatul Syafi
32. Nur Zainal (GK)
33. Nur Yassaini
South Korea

Head Coach: Kim Yoon

1. Kim Eun-ji (GK)
3. Kim Seo-na
6. Lee Yu-jin
7. Lee Yu-ri
8. An Su-jin
9. Kim Min-jeong
10. Cheon Eun-bi (C)
11. Park Mi-rim
12. Jung Sung-hee
13. Jin Su-yeon
14. Park Seo-yeon
15. Park Seung-ae
16. Kim Jeong-ihn
17. Seo Dah-ye
18. Hong Huig-yeong
19. Oh You-min
22. Park Mi-hyang
23. Lee Gae-hun
28. Park Yeong-eun
30. Lee Seo-yeon (GK)
Thailand

Head Coach: Bae Young-wook

1. Kawintida Wisuttiprapa
2. Sawita Kakkaeo
3. Jenjira Kijpakdee
4. Suwapat konthong
5. Theppawan Khongwichien
7. Kunjira Inpa
8. Sudarat Noo-Keaw
9. Arucha Komolwit
10. Thanaphon Khamnon
11. Natthakarn Aunjai
12. Parichart Phopool
13. Supansa Samanso
14. Atittaya Sumphowthong
15. Songkran Pasawat
16. Anongnat Piresram (C)
17. Trinetr Jirapitisatja
18. Siraya Yimkrajang (GK)
20. Watsana Saetan (GK)

== Preliminary round ==
All times are (UTC+05:30)

=== Standings ===
Pos	Team	Pld	W	D	L	GF	GA	GD	Pts	Qualification
1	India (H)	5	5	0	0	26	2	+24	15	Semi-finals
2	China	5	4	0	1	24	4	+20	12	Semi-finals
3	Malaysia	5	2	0	3	5	12	−7	6	Semi-finals
4	Japan	5	1	2	2	6	9	−3	5	Semi-finals
5	South Korea	5	1	1	3	9	9	0	4	Fifth place match
6	Thailand	5	0	1	4	1	35	−34	1	Fifth place match

Source: FIH
Rules for classification: 1) points; 2) goal difference; 3) goals scored; 4) head-to-head result.
(H) Hosts

=== Fixtures ===
11 November 2024
12:15

Japan	2–2	South Korea
Tanaka 5'; Oshima 35'	Report	Park Mi-h. 12'; Lee Yu-j. 57'

Umpires:
Cassidy Gallagher (AUS)
Liu Yao (CHN)

11 November 2024
14:30

China	15–0	Thailand
Xu Y. 5', 43', 55'; Ma Xi. 7', 52'; Ma Xu. 14', 28'; Deng 20'; Yu 32', 40'; Tan 34', 45'; Fan 44'; Zeng 48'; Huang 57'	Report

Umpires:
Junko Wagatsuma (JPN)
Priti Singh (IND)

11 November 2024
16:45

India	4–0	Malaysia
Sangita 8', 55'; Preeti 43'; Udita 44'	Report

Umpires:
Kim Yoon Seon (KOR)
Ornpimol Kittiteerasopon (THA)

12 November 2024
12:15

Thailand	1–1	Japan
Inpa 12'	Report	Hasegawa 55'

Umpires:
Ruchika Wankhede (IND)
Norasyikin Shariudin (MAS)

12 November 2024
14:30

China	5–0	Malaysia
Yu 12'; Tan 41', 55'; Wang 49'; Hao 57'	Report

Umpires:
Kim Yoon Seon (KOR)
Valerie Koh (SGP)

12 November 2024
16:45

India	3–2	South Korea
Sangita 3'; Deepika 20', 57'	Report	Lee Yu-r. 34'; Cheon 38'

Umpires:
Junko Wagatsuma (JPN)
Cassidy Gallagher (AUS)

14 November 2024
12:15

South Korea	1–2	Malaysia
Cheon 15'	Report	Zati 36'; Nur M. 51'

Umpires:
Liu Yao (CHN)
Ruchika Wankhede (IND)

14 November 2024
14:30

Japan	1–2	China
Saito 37'	Report	Wang 24', 49'

Umpires:
Cassidy Gallagher (AUS)
Ornpimol Kittiteerasopon (THA)

14 November 2024
16:45

Thailand	0–13	India
	Report	Deepika 3', 19', 43', 45', 45+'; Preeti 9', 40'; Lalremsiami 12', 56'; Beauty 30'; Navneet 53'; Manisha 55', 58'

Umpires:
Norasyikin Shariudin (MAS)
Valerie Koh (SGP)

16 November 2024
12:15

Malaysia	1–2	Japan
Mohd 26'	Report	Tamura 49'; Hasegawa 51'

Umpires:
Ornpimol Kittiteerasopon (THA)
Valerie Koh (SGP)

16 November 2024
14:30

South Korea	4–0	Thailand
Lee Yu-j. 30'; Park Mi-h. 40'; Seo Da-h. 59'; Jin Su-y. 60'	Report

Umpires:
Priti Singh (IND)
Norasyikin Shariudin (MAS)

16 November 2024
16:45

India	3–0	China
Sangita 32'; Salima 37'; Deepika 60'	Report

Umpires:
Kim Yoon Seon (KOR)
Junko Wagatsuma (JPN)

17 November 2024
12:15

Malaysia	2–0	Thailand
Azhar 41'; Mohd 53'	Report

Umpires:
Ruchika Wankhede (IND)
Junko Wagatsuma (JPN)

17 November 2024
14:30

China	2–0	South Korea
Tan 7', 57'	Report

Umpires:
Norasyikin Shariudin (MAS)
Cassidy Gallagher (AUS)

17 November 2024
16:45

Japan	0–3	India
	Report	Navneet 37'; Deepika 47', 48'

Umpires:
Ornpimol Kittiteerasopon (THA)
Liu Yao (CHN)

== Classification round ==
=== Fifth and sixth place ===
19 November 2024
11:45

South Korea	3–0	Thailand
Kim M. 14'; Lee Yu-r. 35'; Park S. 45'	Report

Umpires:
Norasyikin Shariudin (MAS)
Junko Wagatsuma (JPN)

=== First to fourth place ===
Semi-finals
19 November
China	3
Malaysia	1
19 November
India	2
Japan	0

Final
20 November
China	0
India	1
Third place
20 November
Malaysia	1
Japan	4

==== Semi-finals ====
19 November 2024
14:15

China	3–1	Malaysia
Deng 10'; Fan 17'; Tan 23'	Report	Mohd 36'

Umpires:
Ornpimol Kittiteerasopon (THA)
Cassidy Gallagher (AUS)

19 November 2024
16:45

India	2–0	Japan
Navneet 48'; Lalremsiami 56'	Report

Umpires:
Kim Yoon Seon (KOR)
Liu Yao (CHN)

==== Third and fourth place ====
20 November 2024
14:15

Malaysia	1–4	Japan
Azhairy 48'	Report	Horikawa 3'; Murayama 24'; Tamura 28'; Hasegawa 35'

Umpires:
Liu Yao (CHN)
Ornpimol Kittiteerasopon (THA)

==== Final ====
20 November 2024
16:45

China	0–1	India
	Report	Deepika 31'

Umpires:
Junko Wagatsuma (JPN)
Kim Yoon Seon (KOR)

== Statistics ==
=== Final standings ===
Pos	Team
1st place, gold medalist(s)	India (C, H)
2nd place, silver medalist(s)	China
3rd place, bronze medalist(s)	Japan
4	Malaysia
5	South Korea
6	Thailand

Source: FIH
(C) Champion; (H) Host

=== Statistics ===
There were 86 goals scored in 20 matches, for an average of 4.3 goals per match.

11 goals

- (India) Deepika Sehrawat

7 goals

- (China) Tan Jinzhuang

4 goals

- (India) Sangita Kumari

3 goals

- (China) Wang Lihang
- (China) Xu Yanan
- (China) Yu Anhui
- (India) Preeti Dubey
- (India) Lalremsiami Hmarzote
- (India) Navneet Kaur
- (Japan) Miyu Hasegawa

2 goals

- (China) Deng Qiuchan
- (China) Fan Yunxia
- (China) Ma Xiaoyan
- (China) Ma Xuejiao
- (India) Manisha Chauhan
- (Malaysia) Nur Mohd
- (South Korea) Cheon Eun-bi
- (South Korea) Lee Yu-jin
- (South Korea) Lee Yu-ri
- (South Korea) Park Mi-hyang

1 goal

- (China) Hao Guoting
- (China) Huang Haiyan
- (China) Zeng Xueling
- (India) Beauty Dungdung
- (India) Salima Tete
- (India) Udita Duhan
- (Japan) Mayuri Horikawa
- (Japan) Shiho Kobayakawa
- (Japan) Hiroka Murayama
- (Japan) Natsumi Oshima
- (Japan) Hanami Saito
- (Japan) Ayana Tamura
- (Japan) Saki Tanaka
- (Malaysia) Azmyra Azhairy
- (Malaysia) Nur Azhar
- (Malaysia) Nur Mohammed
- (Malaysia) Khairunnisa Mohd
- (Malaysia) Zati Muhamad
- (South Korea) Jin Suyeon
- (South Korea) Kim Min-jeong
- (South Korea) Park Seo-yeon
- (South Korea) Seo Dahye
- (Thailand) Kunjira Inpa

Source: FIH

== See also ==
- 2024 Men's Asian Champions Trophy
