= Gawande =

Gawande is an Indian (Marathi) surname and may refer to:

- Atul Gawande (born 1965), an Indian-American surgeon, writer, and public health researcher
- Anish Gawande, an Indian politician, national spokesperson of the Nationalist Congress Party – Sharadchandra Pawar
- Himanshi Gawande, an Indian field hockey player
