= Ropni Kumari =

Indian field hockey player (born 2003)

Personal information
- Born: 16 November 2003 (age 22) Simdega, Jharkhand, India

Sport
- Sport: Field hockey
- Position: Defender
Senior career
| Years | Team | Caps | Goals |
| – | Hockey Jharkhand | - | - |
| – | Railways | - | - |
National team
| Years | Team | Caps | Goals |
| 2023 | India U21 | | - |
Medal record
Women's field hockey
Representing India
Junior Asia Cup
| Gold medal – first place | 2023 Japan |

Ropni Kumari (born 16 November 2003) is an Indian field hockey player from Jharkhand. She plays for the India women's national field hockey team as a defender. She plays for Railway Sports Promotion Board and Hockey Jharkhand in the domestic tournaments. She played for Ranchi University in the 2nd Khelo India University games at Bengaluru in 2021.

== Early life ==
Kumari is from Simdega, Jharkhand. She joined the South Easter Railways at Ranchi Rail Division in 2023.

== Career ==
She played all the six matches as part of the Junior India team at the 2023 Women's FIH Hockey Junior Asia Cup in June 2023 at Kakamigahara, where India won the gold. Later in August 2023, she participated in the 4 Nations Junior Women's invitational tournament at Düsseldorf. Then in November, she played the 2023 Women's FIH Hockey Junior World Cup at Santiago. In May 2024, she was part of the Indian National camp at Bengaluru and was selected to the core Senior Indian team probables and was selected to play the FIH Hockey Pro League for women in 2023-2024 but could not make her debut. Now she is listed to play the 2024-2025 Pro League in February 2025 at Bhubaneswar.
