= Libby Hogg =

Canadian field hockey player

Personal information
- Born: 13 August 2002 (age 23) Victoria, Canada
- Height: 157 cm (5 ft 2 in)

Sport
- Sport: Field hockey
- Position: Defence
- Club: Victoria Vikes
National team
Years	Team	Caps	Goals
2021–2023	Canada U–21	11	(0)
2025–	Canada	0	(0)
Medal record
Women's field hockey
Representing Canada

Libby Hogg (born 13 August 2002) is a field hockey player from Canada.

== Personal life ==
Hogg was born and raised in Victoria, the capital city of British Columbia, Canada.

She is a student at the University of Victoria.

== Field hockey ==
=== Domestic league ===
Hogg currently represents the Victoria Vikes, the field hockey team of the University of Victoria, in the Canada West conference of intercollegiate competition of Canada. In 2023 and 2024, Hogg was recognised by U Sports for her achievements, being selected as a U SPORTS All–Canadian. In 2025 she also gained top sporting honour from the University of Victoria, where she was named the President's Cup champion.

=== Under–21 ===
From 2021 until 2023, Hogg was a member of the Canada U–21 squad. She was named in the squad for the 2021 FIH Junior World Cup in Potchefstroom, however after its postponement, she did not compete. It was not until 2023 that Hogg made her first junior international appearance. She made her debut for the team at the 2023 Pan American Junior Championship in Saint Michael, where they finished in fourth place. Later that year she represented the team again for the final time at the 2023 FIH Junior World Cup in Santiago.

=== Senior national team ===
Hogg received her first call-up to the senior national team in 2024. She was named as a travelling reserve for the squad at the 2023–24 FIH Nations Cup in Terrassa.

In 2025 she was officially elevated into the national squad for the first time. While she is yet to earn her first senior international cap, she is set to make her senior international debut during the 2025 Pan American Cup in Montevideo.
