= Lilli de Nooijer =

Dutch field hockey player

Personal information
- Born: 30 July 2002 (age 24) Hamburg, Germany

Sport
- Sport: Field hockey
- Position: Midfield
Senior career
Years	Team	Caps	Goals
–2023	Bloemendaal	-	-
2023–	HGC	-	-
National team
Years	Team	Caps	Goals
2022	Netherlands	2	(0)
2022–2023	Netherlands U–21	11	(2)
2025–	Germany	0	(0)
Medal record
Women's field hockey
Representing Netherlands
FIH Pro League
Silver medal – second place	2021–22
Junior World Cup
Gold medal – first place	2023 Santiago
EuroHockey Junior Championship
Bronze medal – third place	2022 Ghent

Lilli de Nooijer (born 30 July 2002) is a field hockey player from the Netherlands.

== Personal life ==
Lilli de Nooijer is the daughter of former Dutch hockey legend Teun de Nooijer and former German Olympian Philippa Suxdorf. Lillie claims her hockey style is more similar to her father, who was an attacker, while her mother was a defender

== Career ==
=== Domestic ===
In the Dutch Hoofdklasse, de Nooijer represents HGC. She formerly played for Bloemendaal.

=== Under–21 ===
De Nooijer made her debut for the Netherlands U–21 team in 2022. She was a member of the bronze medal-winning team at the EuroHockey Junior Championship in Ghent.

In 2023, she was named in the squad for the FIH Junior World Cup in Santiago.

=== Oranje ===
De Nooijer received her first senior international call-up in 2022. She debuted for Oranje during season three of the FIH Pro League, playing her first matches against India in Bhubaneswar.
