= Valentina Ferola =

Argentine field hockey player (born 2003)

Valentina Férola
Personal information
- Born: 24 September 2003 (age 22) Buenos Aires, Argentina

Sport
- Sport: Field hockey
- Position: Defence
National team
Years	Team	Caps	Goals
2023–2024	Argentina U–21	17	(8)
2024–	Argentina	2	(0)
Medal record
Women's field hockey
Representing Argentina
FIH Junior World Cup
Silver medal – second place	2023 Santiago	Team
Pan American Junior Championship
Gold medal – first place	2024 Surrey	Team
Silver medal – second place	2023 St. Michael	Team

Valentina Férola (born 24 September 2003) is a field hockey player from Argentina.

== Career ==
=== Under–21 ===
Férola made her international debut for Argentina at under–21 level in 2023. She represented the national junior squad at the Pan American Junior Championship in Saint Michael, where she won a silver medal. Later that year she represented the national junior squad again, competing at the FIH Junior World Cup in Santiago, winning another silver medal.

In 2024 she represented the national junior squad for the final time. She was a member of the gold medal-winning squad at the Pan American Junior Championship, held in Surrey. She was also awarded player of the tournament at the conclusion of the competition.

=== Las Leonas ===
Ferola received her maiden call-up to the senior national squad in 2024. She made her senior international debut for Las Leonas in December, during the first of two Argentina legs of the 2024–25 Women's FIH Pro League, held in Santiago del Estero.

She has been named in an extended national squad for 2025.
