= Shilpi Dabas =

Indian field hockey player (born 1998)

Personal information
- Full name: Shilpi Dabas
- Born: 26 July 1998 (age 28) Sonipat, Haryana, India

Sport
- Country: India
- Sport: Field hockey
- Position: Defender
- Club: SG Pipers
Senior career
Years	Team	Caps	Goals
2018–	Railway Sports Promotion Board	-	-
2022–	Hockey Haryana	-	-
2025–	SG Pipers	-	-
National team
Years	Team	Caps	Goals
2026–	India	17	-
Medal record
Women's field hockey
Representing India
Asian Games
Gold medal – first place	2026 Aichi–Nagoya	Team
FIH Women's Nations Cup
Gold medal – first place	2025-26 Auckland	Team

Shilpi Dabas (born 26 July 1998) is an Indian field hockey player who plays as a defender for the India women's national field hockey team and the SG Pipers in the Hockey India League.

== Early life and background ==
Dabas was born in Sonipat, Haryana, to Anita and Anil Dabas. Her mother is a former national-level hockey player who represented Haryana and Air India and had attended national coaching camps in the 1990s. Dabas trained at the Pritam Siwach Hockey Academy in Sonipat under the guidance of former India captain and Dronacharya Awardee Pritam Rani Siwach.

== Career ==
=== Domestic and franchise ===
Dabas began playing in the Senior Women National Hockey Championships in 2018, competing for the Railway Sports Promotion Board (RSPB) and her home state, Hockey Haryana. She also represented Haryana at the National Games of India.

In franchise hockey, she plays in the Women's Hockey India League for the SG Pipers. She featured prominently during the team's championship-winning run in the 2025–26 season, receiving recognition as one of the standout domestic defenders in the competition.

=== International ===
Following eight years on the domestic circuit and strong performances in the Hockey India League, Dabas earned her maiden call-up to the senior national coaching camp in early 2026. She was subsequently named in the senior national squad for the tour of Australia in May 2026.

Dabas made her senior international debut at the 2026 Women's FIH Nations Cup, appearing in a 3–2 pool victory against the United States. India went on to win the gold medal at the tournament, earning promotion to the Women's FIH Pro League. In August 2026, she was selected for India's squad at the 2026 Women's FIH Hockey World Cup, held in Belgium and the Netherlands.
