= Victoria Falasco =

Argentine field hockey player

Personal information
- Born: 1 April 2004 (age 22) Las Flores, Argentina

Sport
- Sport: Field hockey
- Position: Midfielder
National team
Years	Team	Caps	Goals
2023–2024	Argentina U–21	21	(4)
2024–	Argentina	23	(4)
Medal record
Women's field hockey
Representing Argentina
Pan American Cup
Gold medal – first place	2025 Montevideo
South American Games
Gold medal – first place	2026 Santa Fe
FIH Junior World Cup
Silver medal – second place	2023 Santiago	Team
Silver medal – second place	2025 Santiago	Team
Junior Pan American Games
Gold medal – first place	2025 Asunción	Team
Pan American Junior Championship
Gold medal – first place	2024 Surrey	Team
South American Youth Games
Gold medal – first place	2022 Rosario

Victoria Falasco (born 1 April 2004) is a field hockey player from Argentina.

== Career ==
=== Under–21 ===
Falasco made her international debut for Argentina at under–21 level in 2023. She represented the national junior squad at the FIH Junior World Cup in Santiago, winning a silver medal.

In 2024 she represented the national junior squad for the final time. She was a member of the gold medal-winning squad at the Pan American Junior Championship, held in Surrey.

=== Las Leonas ===
Falasco received her maiden call-up to the senior national squad in 2024. She made her senior international debut for Las Leonas in December, during the first of two Argentina legs of the 2024–25 Women's FIH Pro League, held in Santiago del Estero.

She has been named in an extended national squad for 2025.
