= Daniela Mendez-Trendler =

American field hockey player

Personal information
- Born: June 23, 2004 (age 22) Reistertown, Maryland
- Height: 175 cm (5 ft 9 in)

Sport
- Sport: Field hockey
- Position: Midfield
National team
Years	Team	Caps	Goals
2023–	United States U–21	16	(9)
2025–	United States	0	(0)
Medal record
Women's field hockey
Representing United States
Pan American Junior Championship
Gold medal – first place	2023 St. Michael
Silver medal – second place	2024 Surrey

Daniela Mendez-Trendler (born June 23, 2004) is a field hockey player from the United States.

== Personal life ==
Daniela Mendez-Trendler was born and raised in Reistertown, Maryland.

She is a student at the University of Virginia.

== Career ==
=== Under–21 ===
Mendez-Trendler made her international debut for the United States at under–21 level in 2023. She represented the junior squad at the Pan American Junior Championship in Saint Michael, where she won a gold medal. Later that year she represented the team again, competing at the FIH Junior World Cup in Santiago, Chile.

In 2024 she represented the junior squad again, taking home silver her second Pan American Junior Championship, held in Surrey.

=== Senior national team ===
Mendez-Trendler received her maiden call-up to the national senior squad in 2024. She will make her senior international debut in January 2025, during a test series against New Zealand in Auckland.
