= Tessa Reid =

New Zealand field hockey player (born 2003)

Personal information
- Born: 25 August 2003 (age 22) Christchurch, New Zealand

Sport
- Sport: Field hockey
- Position: Midfield
Senior career
Years	Team	Caps	Goals
2024–	Southern Alpiners	-	-
National team
Years	Team	Caps	Goals
2022–2023	New Zealand U–21	9	(3)
2023–	New Zealand	4	(0)
Medal record
Women's field hockey
Representing New Zealand
Junior Oceania Cup
Silver medal – second place	2022 Canberra

Tessa Reid (born 25 August 2003) is a field hockey player from New Zealand.

== Early life ==
Tessa Reid grew up in Christchurch.

She is a former student of Rangi Ruru Girls' School.

== Career ==
=== National league ===
In the Premier Hockey League, Reid plays for the Southern Alpiners.

=== Under–21 ===
Reid made her international debut at under–21 level. She was a member of the silver medal-winning Junior Black Sticks squad at the 2022 Junior Oceania Cup in Canberra. This tournament acted as the Oceania qualifier for the FIH Junior World Cup, with the silver medal securing a qualification quota for New Zealand.

She then went on to represent the junior squad at the 2023 FIH Junior World Cup in Santiago.

=== Black Sticks ===
Following her successful junior debut, Reid made her senior international debut for the Black Sticks in 2023. She made her first appearances during the Christchurch Leg of the fourth season of the FIH Pro League.

She has been named in an extended national squad for 2025.
