= Jans Croon =

American field hockey player

Personal information
- Full name: Jans Tica Croon
- Born: 18 April 2003 (age 23) Amsterdam, The Netherlands
- Height: 168 cm (5 ft 6 in)

Sport
- Sport: Field hockey
- Position: Defence
National team
Years	Team	Caps	Goals
2023–2024	United States U–21	17	(6)
2023–	United States Hockey5s	13	(5)
2025–	United States	0	(0)
Medal record
Women's field hockey
Representing United States
Pan American Cup
Silver medal – second place	2025 Montevideo
Pan American Junior Championship
Gold medal – first place	2023 St. Michael
Silver medal – second place	2024 Surrey
Pan American Hockey5s Cup
Gold medal – first place	2023 Kingston

Jans Tica Croon (born 18 April 2003) is a field hockey player from the United States.

== Personal life ==
Jans Croon was born in Amsterdam, The Netherlands and went to primary school in Haarlem, The Netherlands. She was an ice skater and field hockey player in Haarlem at young age. She moved from The Netherlands to the USA at age 12 and attended high school in Manhattan Beach, California and San Diego, California.

She is a student at the University of Virginia studying Global Security and Justice. She played in the field hockey team of University of Virginia 2021 - 2025 and was named ACC Defensive Player of the Year in 2024.

== Career ==
=== Under–21 ===
Croon made her international debut for the United States at under–21 level in 2022. She participated in the 2022 Uniphar 5-Nations Tournament where the team earned bronze. In 2023 she represented the junior squad at the Pan American Junior Championship in Saint Michael, where she won a gold medal. Later that year she represented the team again, competing at the FIH Junior World Cup in Santiago, Chile.

In 2024 she represented the junior squad again, taking home silver at her second Pan American Junior Championship, held in Surrey.

=== Hockey5s ===
She also represents the United States in the Hockey5s format. She was a member of the gold medal winning squad at the 2023 Pan American Hockey5s Cup in Kingston, as well as the inaugural edition of the FIH Hockey5s World Cup in Muscat in 2024.

=== Senior national team ===
Croon received her maiden call-up to the national senior squad in 2024. She will make her senior international debut in January 2025, during a test series against New Zealand in Auckland.
