= Isis van Loon =

Dutch field hockey player

Personal information
- Full name: Isis Martha Mies van Loon
- Born: 26 March 2002 (age 24) The Hague, Netherlands

Sport
- Sport: Field hockey
- Position: Forward
Senior career
Years	Team	Caps	Goals
2021–	HGC	-	-
National team
Years	Team	Caps	Goals
2022–	Netherlands	2	(0)
2022–	Netherlands U–21	5	(0)
Medal record
Women's field hockey
Representing Netherlands
FIH Pro League
Silver medal – second place	2021–22
Junior World Cup
Gold medal – first place	2023 Santiago
EuroHockey Junior Championship
Bronze medal – third place	2022 Ghent

Isis Martha Mies van Loon (born 26 March 2002) is a field hockey player from the Netherlands.

== Personal life ==
Isis van Loon was born and raised in The Hague.

== Career ==
=== Domestic ===
In the Dutch Hoofdklasse, van Loon represents HGC.

=== Under–21 ===
Van Loon made her debut for the Netherlands U–21 team in 2022. She was a member of the bronze medal-winning team at the EuroHockey Junior Championship in Ghent.

In 2023, she was named in the squad for the FIH Junior World Cup in Santiago.

=== Oranje ===
Van Loon received her first senior international call-up in 2022. She debuted for Oranje during season three of the FIH Pro League, playing her first matches against India in Bhubaneswar.
