= Mahima Tete =

Indian field hockey player (born 2003)

Mahima Tete (25 July 2003) is an Indian hockey player from Jharkhand. She plays for the India women's national field hockey team as a midfielder. She plays for Jharkhand in the domestic tournaments.

== Early life ==
Tete is from a village in Simdega district, Jharkhand. She is the younger sister of Olympian Salima Tete. She took up hockey at an early age like all the children in Simdega but she stopped at the age of nine in 2012 to focus on studies. But she was persuaded to get bach, and she started playing hockey again after about a year. Both the sisters were initially coached by their father Sulakshan.

== Career ==
Tete made her debut as a junior player and toured Ireland in June 2022, and later, South Africa with the Indian under 23 team. In August 2023, she played the 2023 4 Nations Junior Women's Invitational Tournament at Düsseldorf. In December 2023, she also played the Junior World Cup at Santiago. But her first full-fledged international tournament is the Junior Asia Cup in June 2023 at Kakamigahara, Japan.

She was part of the international tour of Australia from 26 April to 4 May at Perth. Later, she trained as part of the 40 probables at the Senior India camp at SAI, Bangalore and was selected to play the FIH Pro League 2024-25 European leg, which was played from 14 June to 29 June at London, Antwerp, and Berlin.

=== Domestic ===
Tete played a crucial role in all the five matches for Jharkhand which won the 15th Senior Women National Championship in 2024. Jharkhand beat Haryana in the shootout of the final match.
