= Natsumi Oshima =

Japanese field hockey player

Personal information
- Born: 15 June 2002 (age 24) Tochigi, Japan
- Height: 158 cm (5 ft 2 in)
- Weight: 56 kg (123 lb)

Sport
- Sport: Field hockey
- Position: Midfield
- Club: Ritsumeikan University
National team
Years	Team	Caps	Goals
2023–	Japan U–21	15	(5)
2024–	Japan	0	(0)
Medal record
Women's field hockey
Representing Japan
Asian Champions Trophy
Bronze medal – third place	2024 Rajgir
Junior Asian Cup
Bronze medal – third place	2023 Kakamigahara

Natsumi Oshima (大嶋 夏実, born 15 June 2002) is a field hockey player from Japan.

== Personal life ==
Natsumi Oshima was born on 15 June 2002, in Tochigi.

== Career ==
=== Domestic league ===
In the Japanese national league, Oshima represents the Ritsumeikan University Hollys.

=== Under–21 ===
Oshima made her junior international debut in 2023. She made her first appearances for the Japanese U–21 team during a test series against Australia in the Gold Coast. She went on to represent Japan again at the Junior Asian Cup in Kakamigahara, winning a bronze medal. To close out 2023, Oshima represented Japan again at the FIH Junior World Cup in Santiago, concluding the tournament with a seventh-place finish.

=== Cherry Blossoms ===
In 2024, Oshima was named in the senior national team for the first time. She will make her international debut at the Asian Champions Trophy in Rajgir.
