= Mikki Roberts =

Dutch field hockey player

Personal information
- Born: 22 February 2002 (age 24) Tilburg, Netherlands

Sport
- Sport: Field hockey
- Position: Defender
Senior career
Years	Team	Caps	Goals
–	HC Tilburg	-	-
National team
Years	Team	Caps	Goals
2023	Netherlands U–21	6	(8)
2024–	Netherlands	1	(0)
Medal record
Women's field hockey
Representing Netherlands
FIH Junior World Cup
Gold medal – first place	2023 Santiago	Team

Mikki Roberts is a field hockey player from the Netherlands.

== Personal life ==
Mikki Roberts was born on 22 February 2002, in Tilburg.

She is a student at Tilburg University.

== Career ==
=== Under–21 ===
Roberts made her international debut at under–21 level. In 2023, she captained the Netherlands U–21 side at the FIH Junior World Cup in Santiago. In the final, she scored twice to send the game to a shoot–out, which the team won to take home a gold medal.

=== Oranje ===
In 2024, Roberts received her first call-up to the senior national team. She made her senior international debut during season five of the FIH Pro League. With the addition of new head coach, Raoul Ehren, she was officially called up to the national squad.
