= Astrid Bonami =

Belgian field hockey player (born 2003)

Personal information
- Born: 19 May 2003 (age 23) Belgium

Sport
- Sport: Field hockey
- Position: Forward
- Club: R. Wellington THC
Senior career
| Years | Team | Caps | Goals |
| 2023–2025 | Gantoise | - | - |
| 2025- | R. Wellington THC | - | - |
National team
| Years | Team | Caps | Goals |
| 2022– | Belgium | 33 | (8) |
| 2022–2024 | Belgium U–21 | 15 | (19) |
Medal record
Women's field hockey
Representing Belgium
FIH Junior World Cup
| Bronze medal – third place | 2023 Santiago | Team |
EuroHockey Junior Championships
| Silver medal – second place | 2022 Ghent | Team |

Astrid Bonami (born 19 May 2003) is a Belgian field hockey player.

== Career ==
=== National league ===
In the ION Hockey League, Bonami plays for Gantoise.

=== International ===
==== National team ====
Bonami made her debut for the Red Panthers during season three of the FIH Pro League.

Following her debut in 2022, Bonami was named in the national squad. In 2023, she represented the team during season four of the FIH Pro League, scoring her first international goals.

==== Under–21 ====
In 2022, Bonami made her junior debut at the EuroHockey Junior Championship in Ghent, where she won a silver medal.

She was also named in the squad for the 2023 FIH Junior World Cup in Santiago.
