= Estel Petchamé =

Spanish field hockey player (born 2005)

Personal information
- Full name: Estel Petchamé Hernández
- Born: 24 May 2005 (age 21) Terrassa, Spain

Sport
- Sport: Field hockey
- Position: Forward
Senior career
Years	Team	Caps	Goals
–	CD Terrassa	-	-
National team
Years	Team	Caps	Goals
2024–	Spain U–21	5	(2)
2025–	Spain	0	(0)
Medal record
Women's field hockey
Representing Spain
EuroHockey Championship
Bronze medal – third place	2025 Mönchengladbach
EuroHockey U21 Championship
Silver medal – second place	2024 Terrassa

Estel Petchamé Hernández (born 24 May 2005) is a field and indoor hockey player from Spain.

== Personal life ==
Estel Petchamé was born and raised in Terrassa, Catalonia. She has an older brother, Pau, who also plays field hockey for Spain.

== Field hockey ==
=== Domestic league ===
In the Spanish national league, the Liga Iberdrola, Petchamé represents CD Terrassa.

=== Under–21 ===
Petchamé made her junior international debut for the Spanish U–21 team in 2024. Her first junior caps came at the EuroHockey U21 Championship in Terrassa. At the tournament she won scored on two occasions, helping the Spanish team to a silver medal.

=== Red Sticks ===
Petchamé received her first call-up to the national squad in 2024. She will make her senior international debut in 2025, during the Sydney leg of the 2024–25 FIH Pro League.

== Indoor hockey ==
In addition to field hockey, Petchamé also represents Spain at an international level in indoor hockey. She made her debut for the Spanish Indoor team in 2024, helping the squad to a fourth-place finish at the EuroHockey Indoor Championship in Berlin.
