= Mercedes Artola =

Argentine field hockey player (born 2006)

Personal information
- Born: 16 January 2006 (age 20) Buenos Aires, Argentina

Sport
- Sport: Field hockey
- Position: Goalkeeper
- Club: River Plate
National team
Years	Team	Caps	Goals
2023 – present	Argentina U–21	33	-
2024–	Argentina	11	(0)
Medal record
Women's field hockey
Representing Argentina
World Cup
Gold medal – first place	2026 Wavre/Amstelveen
Pan American Cup
Gold medal – first place	2025 Montevideo
South American Games
Gold medal – first place	2026 Santa Fe
FIH Junior World Cup
Silver medal – second place	2023 Santiago	Team
Silver medal – second place	2025 Santiago	Team
Pan American Junior Championship
Gold medal – first place	2024 Surrey
Gold medal – first place	2026 Santiago
Junior Pan American Games
Gold medal – first place	2025 Asunción	Team

Mercedes Artola (born 16 January 2006) is a field hockey player from Argentina.

== Career ==
=== Under–21 ===
Artola made her international debut for Argentina at under–21 level in 2023. She represented the national junior squad at the FIH Junior World Cup in Santiago, winning a silver medal and the award for the best goalkeeper of the tournament.

In 2024 she represented the national junior squad for the final time. She was a member of the gold medal-winning squad at the Pan American Junior Championship, held in Surrey.

=== Las Leonas ===
Artola received her maiden call-up to the senior national squad in 2024. She made her senior international debut for Las Leonas in December, during the first of two Argentina legs of the 2024–25 Women's FIH Pro League, held in Santiago del Estero.

She has been named in an extended national squad for 2025.
