= Huang Haiyan =

Chinese field hockey player

Personal information
- Born: 28 June 2000 (age 26) China

Sport
- Sport: Field hockey
- Position: Forward
National team
Years	Team	Caps	Goals
2022–	China	29	(4)
Medal record
Women's field hockey
Representing China
Asian Games
Gold medal – first place	2022 Hangzhou	Team
Asian Champions Trophy
Silver medal – second place	2024 Rajgir
Bronze medal – third place	2023 Ranchi	Team

Huang Haiyan (born 28 June 2000) is a field hockey player from China, who plays as a forward.

== Career ==
Huang Haiyan made her national debut for China in 2022. She represented her country at the Asian Cup in Muscat. She followed this up with an appearance in season three of the FIH Pro League.

She didn't represent the national team again until 2023. She appeared during season four of the FIH Pro League, as well as in a test series against Australia in Perth. Later that year she won her first gold medal with the national team, taking home the title at the Asian Games in Hangzhou. A month after the Asian Games, Haiyan also won bronze at the Asian Champions Trophy in Ranchi.

In 2024, Haiyan has represented China in season five of the FIH Pro League and at the International Festival of Hockey in Perth.

=== International goals ===
Goal	Date	Location	Opponent	Score	Result	Competition	Ref.
1	25 September 2023	Gongshu Canal Sports Park Stadium, Hangzhou, China	Indonesia	6–0	20–0	2022 Asian Games	
2	27 September 2023	Gongshu Canal Sports Park Stadium, Hangzhou, China	Kazakhstan	8–0	11–0	2022 Asian Games	
3	3 October 2023	Gongshu Canal Sports Park Stadium, Hangzhou, China	Thailand	2–0	12–0	2022 Asian Games	
4	3 October 2023	Gongshu Canal Sports Park Stadium, Hangzhou, China	Thailand	12–0	12–0	2022 Asian Games	
