= Jyoti Singh (field hockey) =

Indian hockey player

Personal information
- Born: 6 October 2004 (age 22) Sonipat, Haryana, India

Sport
- Sport: Field hockey
- Position: Defender
Senior career
Years	Team	Caps	Goals
–	Madhya Pradesh Hockey Academy	-	-
2025–	Soorma Hockey Club	-	-
National team
Years	Team	Caps	Goals
2023–2024	India U21	16	(0)
2025–	India	12	(0)
Medal record
Women's field hockey
Representing India
Junior Asia Cup
Gold medal – first place	2024 Oman

Jyoti Singh (born 6 October 2004) is an Indian hockey player from Haryana. She plays for the India women's national field hockey team as a defender. She played for JSW Soorma Hockey Club in the Women's Hockey India League 2025.

== Early life and career ==
Jyoti is from Sonepat, Haryana. Her late father, Narender Singh, died in an accident. She was trained by former India captain and coach Pritam Rani Siwach, who accepted to bear the school fees of Rs.250 per month, if her mother agreed to send her to the hockey academy.

== Career ==
In December 2023, Jyoti represented India in the Women's FIH Junior World Cup 2023 held at Santiago, Chile, where India finished ninth. Earlier in August 2023, she took part in the under-21, 4 Nations Junior Women's Invitational Tournament at Düsseldorf.

In February 2025, she made her senior India debut against Spain in the FIH Pro Hockey League. In May 2024, she was named as the captain of the Indian Junior Women's team by Hockey India, in the 22-member squad announced for the tour of Europe from 21 to 20 May 2024.

She was declared as the best player of the tournament in the inaugural Women's Hockey India League.
