= Xu Yanan =

Chinese field hockey player

Personal information
- Born: 3 October 2001 (age 24) China

Sport
- Sport: Field hockey
- Position: Forward
National team
Years	Team	Caps	Goals
2023–	China	8	(2)
Medal record
Women's field hockey
Representing China
Asian Champions Trophy
Silver medal – second place	2024 Rajgir

Xu Yanan (born 3 October 2001) is a field hockey player from China, who plays as a forward.

== Career ==
=== National team ===
Xu Yanan made her senior international debut for China in 2023. She made her first appearance during a match against New Zealand during season three of the FIH Pro League and scored on debut. She made numerous more appearances during the FIH Pro League, as well as during a test series against Australia in Perth.

In 2024, Xu was named in the national squad for the Asian Champions Trophy in Rajgir.

=== International goals ===
Goal	Date	Location	Opponent	Score	Result	Competition	Ref.
1	19 February 2023	National Hockey Stadium, Wellington, New Zealand	New Zealand	1–1	1–1	2022–23 FIH Pro League	
2	26 March 2023	Perth Hockey Stadium, Perth, Australia	Australia	2–1	4–3	Test Match	
