= Jip Dicke =

Dutch field hockey player (born 2002)

Personal information
- Born: 9 July 2002 (age 24) The Hague, Netherlands

Sport
- Sport: Field hockey
- Position: Forward
Senior career
Years	Team	Caps	Goals
–2023	HDM	-	-
2024–	SCHC	-	-
National team
Years	Team	Caps	Goals
2022–2023	Netherlands U–21	12	(17)
2025–	Netherlands	0	(0)
Medal record
Women's field hockey
Representing Netherlands
FIH Junior World Cup
Gold medal – first place	2022 Potchefstroom	Team
Gold medal – first place	2023 Santiago	Team

Jip Dicke (born 9 July 2002) is field hockey player from the Netherlands, who plays as a forward.

== Personal life ==
Jip Dicke was born and raised in The Hague. Her sister, Pien, also plays international field hockey for the Netherlands.

== Career ==
=== Domestic ===
In the Dutch Hoofdklasse, Dicke represents SCHC alongside her sister. She has also previously represented HDM.

=== Under–21 ===
Dicke has had a hugely successful junior international career. She represented the Netherlands U–21 side from 2022 to 2023, during which time she won two FIH Junior World Cup gold medals. Her first gold came at the 2022 edition in Potchefstroom, where she was the tournament top goalscorer. Her second came at the 2023 edition in Santiago, her final appearance with the junior squad.

=== Oranje ===
In 2025, Dicke received her first call-up to the Oranje squad. She will make her senior internal debut during the European Leg of the 2024–25 FIH Pro League.
