= Berta Agulló =

Spanish field hockey player (born 2000)

Berta Agulló Sánchez
Personal information
- Full name: Berta Agulló Sánchez
- Born: 26 May 2000 (age 26) Madrid, Spain

Sport
- Sport: Field hockey
- Position: Midfield
Senior career
Years	Team	Caps	Goals
–	Club de Campo	-	-
National team
Years	Team	Caps	Goals
2019–2021	Spain U–21	6	(0)
2020–	Spain Indoor	17	(8)
2023–	Spain	8	(1)
Medal record
Women's field hockey
Representing Spain
EuroHockey Championship
Bronze medal – third place	2025 Mönchengladbach
EuroHockey U–21 Championship
Gold medal – first place	2019 Valencia

Berta Agulló Sánchez (born 26 May 2000) is a field hockey player from Spain.

== Field hockey ==
=== Domestic league ===
In the Spanish national league, the Liga Iberdrola, Agulló represents Club de Campo. She has also previously represented Sanse Complutense.

=== Under–21 ===
In 2019, Agulló was a member of the history-making Spanish U–21 side at the EuroHockey U–21 Championship in Valencia. At the tournament, she won a gold medal.

=== Red Sticks ===
Agulló made her senior international debut for the Red Sticks in 2023. She earned her first cap during a test match against New Zealand in Mount Maunganui.

Following the 2024 Summer Olympics, a number of players in the national squad retired. As a result, Agulló was officially raised to the senior squad for 2025. Since her inclusion in the squad, she has appeared throughout the 2024–25 FIH Pro League, scoring her first international goal in the process.

== International goals ==
The following is a list of goals scored by Agulló at international level.

Goal	Date	Location	Opponent	Score	Result	Competition	Ref.
1	15 February 2025	Kalinga Stadium, Bhubaneswar, India	Germany	2–1	2–1	2024–25 FIH Pro League	

== Indoor hockey ==
Agulló also represents the Spanish national team in indoor hockey. She has appeared at a number of international tournaments, including:

- 2020 EuroHockey Indoor Championship III – Bratislava, Slovakia
- 2022 EuroHockey Indoor Championship II – Ourense, Spain
- 2024 EuroHockey Indoor Championship – Berlin, Germany

At the EuroHockey Indoor Championship in 2024, she was named player of the tournament.
