= Lisa Moors =

Belgian field hockey player

Personal information
- Born: 5 July 2006 (age 20) Belgium

Sport
- Sport: Field hockey
- Position: Midfield
- Club: Leuven
National team
Years	Team	Caps	Goals
2023–	Belgium U–21	11	(1)
2024–	Belgium	17	(1)
Medal record
Women's field hockey
Representing Belgium
World Cup
Bronze medal – third place	2026 Wavre/Amstelveen
FIH Pro League
Bronze medal – third place	Season Six
FIH Junior World Cup
Bronze medal – third place	2023 Santiago
Bronze medal – third place	2025 Santiago
EuroHockey U–18 Championship
Silver medal – second place	2023 Krefeld

Lisa Moors (born 5 July 2006) is a field hockey player from Belgium.

== Field hockey ==
=== Domestic league ===
Moors currently competes in the Carlsberg 0.0 Hockey League, where she plays for KHC Leuven.

=== Under–18 ===
In 2023, Moors made her first international appearances for Belgium with the national U–18 team. She was a member of the squad that won a silver medal at the EuroHockey U–18 Championship in Krefeld. At the conclusion of the tournament, her efforts were recognised and she was awarded as the Player of the Tournament.

=== Under–21 ===
Following her U–18 debut earlier in the year, Moors also made her first appearances for the Belgium U–21 in 2023. She was a member of the history making squad that won a bronze medal at the FIH Junior World Cup in Santiago, defeating England 7–0 in the bronze medal match.

She represented the team again in 2024 at the EuroHockey U–21 Championship in Terrassa.

=== Senior national team ===
Moors made her senior international debut for the Red Panthers in 2024. She earned her first senior international cap during the Santiago del Estero leg of season five of the FIH Pro League, in a match against Argentina. After missing the Summer Olympics, she was called back into the squad later that year for the Hangzhou leg of the sixth season of the FIH Pro League. During her time in China, Moors scored her first international goal in an 8–2 win against England.

Throughout 2025, Moors continued representing Belgium through the FIH Pro League, helping the squad to a bronze medal finish. She has most recently been named in the squad for the 2025 EuroHockey Championship in Mönchengladbach.

== International goals ==
The following table lists all goals scored by Moors at international level.

Goal	Date	Location	Opponent	Score	Result	Event	Ref
1	5 December 2024	Gongshu Canal Sports Park Hockey Field, Hangzhou, China	England	5–2	8–2	2024–25 FIH Pro League	
