= Daantje de Kruijff =

Australian field hockey player

Personal information
- Full name: Daantje Hanne de Kruijff
- Born: 7 May 2002 (age 24) Amsterdam, Netherlands

Sport
- Sport: Field hockey
- Position: Midfield
Senior career
Years	Team	Caps	Goals
–2025	Hurley	-	-
2025–	Amsterdam	-	-
National team
Years	Team	Caps	Goals
2022–2023	Netherlands U–21	17	(0)
2025–	Netherlands	8	(0)
Medal record
Women's field hockey
Representing Netherlands
World Cup
Silver medal – second place	2026 Wavre/Amstelveen
FIH Pro League
Gold medal – first place	Season Seven
FIH Junior World Cup
Gold medal – first place	2022 Potchefstroom
Gold medal – first place	2023 Santiago
EuroHockey U–21 Championship
Bronze medal – third place	2022 Ghent

Daantje Hanne de Kruijff (born 7 May 2002) is a Dutch field hockey player.

== Personal life ==
De Kruijff was born in Amsterdam, the capital city of the Netherlands.

== Career ==
=== Domestic league ===
In the Hoofdklasse, de Kruijff plays for Amsterdam. She made the move in 2025, having previously competed for Hurley.

=== Under–21 ===
She made her junior national debut in 2022 at the FIH Junior World Cup in Potchefstroom. At the tournament she won a gold medal. She followed this up with a bronze medal performance at the EuroHockey U–21 Championship in Ghent.

In 2023 she captained the side to gold at her second FIH Junior World Cup, held in Santiago.

=== Oranje ===
In 2025, she was included in the national squad for the first time. She made her senior international debut that same year, earning her first cap during a match against Germany during the 2025–26 FIH Pro League in Santiago del Estero.

She was named in the Dutch squad for her first major tournament, the 2026 FIH World Cup in Amsterdam and Wavre.
