= Perrine de Clerck =

Belgian field hockey player

Personal information
- Full name: Perrine Isablle de Clerck
- Born: 1 July 2006 (age 20) Belgium

Sport
- Sport: Field hockey
- Position: Midfield
- Club: Leuven
National team
Years	Team	Caps	Goals
2023–	Belgium U–21	12	(5)
2024–	Belgium	10	(0)
Medal record
Women's field hockey
Representing Belgium
World Cup
Bronze medal – third place	2026 Wavre/Amstelveen
FIH Junior World Cup
Bronze medal – third place	2023 Santiago
Bronze medal – third place	2025 Santiago
EuroHockey U18 Championship
Silver medal – second place	2018 Krefeld

Perrine Isabelle de Clerck (born 1 July 2006) is a field hockey player from Belgium.

== Career ==
=== Domestic league ===
De Clerck currently plays in the Carlsberg 0.0 Hockey League for KHC Leuven.

=== Under–18 ===
In 2023, de Clerck made her international debut at under–18 level. She was captain of the national youth squad that won a silver medal at the EuroHockey U18 Championship held in Krefeld.

=== Under–21 ===
Following her under–18 debut, de Clerck progressed into the national junior team, also in 2023. She was a named in the squad for the FIH Junior World Cup in Santiago. At the tournament, she helped the side to a bronze medal with an emphatic 7–0 victory over England.

In 2025 she won her second bronze medal at her second FIH Junior World Cup, also held in Santiago.

=== Red Panthers ===
De Clerck made her senior international debut in 2024. She earned her first cap during season five of the FIH Pro League, in a match against Argentina in Santiago del Estero.

She continued representing the national squad throughout 2025 during the sixth season of the FIH Pro League, and has been named in the squad for season seven.
