= Paula Jiménez =

Spanish field hockey player (born 2004)

Personal information
- Full name: Paula Jiménez Vicente
- Born: 13 August 2004 (age 22) Madrid, Spain

Sport
- Sport: Field hockey
- Position: Midfield
Senior career
Years	Team	Caps	Goals
–	Sanse Complutense	-	-
National team
Years	Team	Caps	Goals
2022–	Spain U–21	20	(2)
2025–	Spain	0	(0)
Medal record
Women's field hockey
Representing Spain
EuroHockey Championship
Bronze medal – third place	2025 Mönchengladbach
EuroHockey U21 Championship
Silver medal – second place	2024 Terrassa

Paula Jiménez Vicente (born 13 August 2004) is a field and indoor hockey player from Spain.

== Personal life ==
Paula Jiménez was born and raised in Madrid. Her older sister, Lucía, also plays field hockey for Spain.

== Field hockey ==
=== Domestic league ===
In the Liga Iberdrola and Euro Hockey League, Jiménez represents Sanse Complutense.

=== Under–21 ===
Jiménez made her junior international debut for the Spanish U–21 team in 2022, during the EuroHockey U–21 Championship in Ghent.

She continued to represent the junior national team in 2023. She was a member of the squad at a Four–Nations Tournament in Düsseldorf, as well as the FIH Junior World Cup in Santiago.

In 2024, Jiménez captained the junior squad to a silver medal at the EuroHockey U–21 Championship in Terrassa.

=== Red Sticks ===
Jiménez received her first call-up to the national squad in 2024.

== Indoor hockey ==
In 2024, Jiménez made her indoor debut for the Spanish indoor side. She represented the team at the EuroHockey Indoor Championship in Berlin, where the team finished fourth.
