= Teresa Lima =

Spanish field hockey player (born 2004)

Personal information
- Full name: Teresa Lima Cortés
- Born: 13 August 2004 (age 21) Sant Cugat del Vallès, Spain

Sport
- Sport: Field hockey
- Position: Forward
Senior career
| Years | Team | Caps | Goals |
| – | Junior | - | - |
National team
| Years | Team | Caps | Goals |
| 2023–2024 | Spain U–21 | 15 | (8) |
| 2025– | Spain | 11 | (0) |
Medal record
Women's field hockey
Representing Spain
EuroHockey Championship
| Bronze medal – third place | 2025 Mönchengladbach |
EuroHockey U21 Championship
| Silver medal – second place | 2024 Terrassa |

Teresa Lima Cortés (born 13 August 2004) is a field hockey player from Spain.

== Personal life ==
Teresa Lima was born and raised in Sant Cugat del Vallès.

== Career ==
=== Under–21 ===
Lima made her junior international debut for the Spanish U–21 team in 2023, during a Four–Nations Tournament in Düsseldorf. At the tournament she scored on four occasions, finishing as top goalscorer. Later that year she represented Spain again at the FIH Junior World Cup in Santiago. Despite her nation finishing in eighth place, Lima was rewarded for her exceptional performance, winning the Player of the Tournament award. This also led to Lima being recognised at the FIH Rising Star of the Year in the 2023 FIH Player of the Year Awards.

=== Red Sticks ===
Following her outstanding Junior World Cup campaign, Lima was called up to the national squad.

In 2024, Lima was selected to make her debut for the Red Sticks. She will earn her first international cap during the 2023–24 FIH Nations Cup in Terrassa.
