= Julia Hemmerle =

German field hockey player

Personal information
- Born: 29 May 2003 (age 23) Mülheim, Germany

Sport
- Sport: Field hockey
- Position: Defence
Senior career
| Years | Team | Caps | Goals |
| 2006–2022 | Uhlenhorst Mülheim | - | - |
| 2022– | Mannheimer | - | - |
National team
| Years | Team | Caps | Goals |
| 2021–2021 | Germany U–18 | 4 | (0) |
| 2022– | Germany | 12 | (0) |
| 2022–2024 | Germany U–21 | 26 | (0) |
Medal record
Women's field hockey
Representing Germany
FIH Junior World Cup
| Silver medal – second place | 2022 Potchefstroom |
EuroHockey U–21 Championship
| Gold medal – first place | 2022 Ghent |
EuroHockey U–18 Championship
| Gold medal – first place | 2021 Valencia |

Julia Hemmerle (born 29 May 2003) is a field hockey player from Germany.

== Education ==
Hemmerle is studying a degree in medicine at Heidelberg University.

== Career ==
=== Domestic league ===
Throughout her junior career, Hemmerle represented Uhlenhorst Mülheim, before moving to Mannheimer in 2022.

=== Under–18 ===
Hemmerle made her international debut at under–18 level. In 2021, she was a member of the gold medal-winning national youth squad at the EuroHockey U–18 Championship held in Krefeld.

=== Under–21 ===
Hemmerle was a member of the national junior team from 2022 until 2024. During her time with the team, she won medals at two tournaments. She won silver at the 2022 FIH Junior World Cup in Potchefstroom, and gold at the 2022 in Ghent.

=== Die Danas ===
Hemmerle made her senior international debut in 2022. She earned her first cap during season three of the FIH Pro League, in a match against India in Bhubaneswar.

Following her debut, Hemmerle did not receive a call-up to Die Danas again until 2024, a period spanning almost three years. Since being recalled, she has been a semi-regular inclusion in the national side. She has most recently been named in the travelling squad for season seven matches in Valencia.
