= Blanca Pérez =

Spanish field hockey player

Personal information
- Full name: Blanca Pérez Alejandro
- Born: 17 September 2003 (age 22) Spain

Sport
- Sport: Field hockey
- Position: Forward
Senior career
Years	Team	Caps	Goals
–	Club de Campo	-	-
National team
Years	Team	Caps	Goals
2022–	Spain U–21	14	(3)
2024–	Spain	10	(0)
Medal record
Women's field hockey
Representing Spain
FIH Nations Cup
Gold medal – first place	2023–24 Terrassa
FIH Olympic Qualifiers
Silver medal – second place	2024 Valencia

Blanca Pérez Alejandro (born 17 September 2003) is a Spanish field hockey player.

== Career ==
=== Domestic league ===
In the Spanish national league, the Liga Iberdrola, Pérez represents the Club de Campo.

=== Under–21 ===
Pérez made her debut for the Spanish U–21s in 2022, representing the team at the EuroHockey Junior Championship in Ghent.

In 2023 she represented the team at the 2023 FIH Junior World Cup.

=== Red Sticks ===
Pérez will make her senior international debut for the Red Sticks in 2024. She was named in the squad for the FIH Olympic Qualifiers in Valencia.
