= Louise Dewaet =

Belgian field hockey player (born 2005)

Personal information
- Born: 14 June 2005 (age 21) Belgium

Sport
- Sport: Field hockey
- Position: Forward
- Club: Braxgata
National team
Years	Team	Caps	Goals
2023–	Belgium U–21	6	(6)
2024–	Belgium	7	(1)
Medal record
Women's field hockey
Representing Belgium
World Cup
Bronze medal – third place	2026 Wavre/Amstelveen
FIH Junior World Cup
Bronze medal – third place	2023 Santiago	Team
Bronze medal – third place	2025 Santiago	Team

Louise Dewaet (born 14 June 2005) is a Belgian field hockey player.

== Career ==
=== National league ===
In the ION Hockey League, Dewaet plays for Braxgata.

=== Under–21 ===
Dewaet made her international debut at under–21 level. She was a member of the bronze medal-winning squad at the 2023 FIH Junior World Cup in Santiago.

=== Red Panthers ===
Following her outstanding FIH Junior World Cup campaign, Dewaet received a call-up to the national squad in 2024. She made her debut for the Red Panthers during season five of the FIH Pro League, during the team's away matches in Santiago del Estero. She was included in the national squad again during the home leg of the FIH Pro League in Antwerp.

==== International goals ====
Goal	Date	Location	Opponent	Score	Result	Competition	Ref.
1	23 May 2024	Wilrijkse Plein, Antwerp, Belgium	India	2–0	2–0	2023–24 FIH Pro League	
