= Carmen Fernández =

Spanish field hockey player (born 2006)

Personal information
- Full name: Carmen Fernández de Velasco Arroyo
- Born: 2 November 2006 (age 19) Santander, Spain

Sport
- Sport: Field hockey
- Position: Forward
Senior career
Years	Team	Caps	Goals
–	RS Tenis	-	-
National team
Years	Team	Caps	Goals
2023–	Spain U–21	15	(2)
2025–	Spain	0	(0)
Medal record
Women's field hockey
Representing Spain
EuroHockey U21 Championship
Silver medal – second place	2024 Terrassa

Carmen Fernández de Velasco Arroyo (born 2 November 2006) is a field hockey player from Spain.

== Personal life ==
Carmen Fernández was born and raised in Santander, Cantabria.

== Field hockey ==
=== Domestic league ===
In the Spanish national league, the Liga Iberdrola, Fernández represents RS Tenis.

=== Under–21 ===
Fernández made her junior international debut for the Spanish U–21 team in 2023. Her first junior caps came at a Four–Nations Tournament in Düsseldorf. Later that year she represented the squad again, participating in the FIH Junior World Cup in Santiago.

In 2024, Fernández was a member of the silver medal winning junior squad at the EuroHockey U21 Championship in Terrassa.

=== Red Sticks ===
Fernández received her first call-up to the national squad in 2024. She will make her senior international debut in 2025, during the Sydney leg of the 2024–25 FIH Pro League.
