= 2023 Women's FIH Hockey Junior World Cup =

U21 field hockey championship

Tournament details
- Host country: Chile
- City: Santiago
- Dates: 29 November – 10 December
- Teams: 16 (from 5 confederations)
- Venue: Centro Deportivo de Hockey Césped

Final positions
- Champions: Netherlands (5th title)
- Runner-up: Argentina
- Third place: Belgium

Tournament statistics
- Matches played: 48
- Goals scored: 235 (4.9 per match)
- Top scorer: (Belgium) Astrid Bonami (11 goals)
- Best player: (Spain) Teresa Lima
- Best goalkeeper: (Argentina) Mercedes Artola

The 2023 Women's FIH Hockey Junior World Cup was the tenth edition of the Women's FIH Hockey Junior World Cup, the biennial women's under–21 field hockey world championship organised by the International Hockey Federation. It was held in Santiago, Chile from 29 November to 10 December 2023.

The Netherlands were the defending champions, having won a record-extending fourth title at the 2022 edition. They defended their title by defeating Argentina 4–1 in a shoot-out in the final after the match finished 2–2 in regular time. Belgium won their first medal by defeating England 7–0 in the bronze medal match.

== Qualification ==
Alongside the hosts, Chile, the 15 other teams qualified via the continental championships.

Dates	Event	Location	Quotas	Qualifier(s)
2 July 2021	Hosts	—N/a	1	Chile
24–30 July 2022	2022 EuroHockey Junior Championship	Ghent, Belgium	5	Germany; Belgium; Netherlands; England; Spain
8–11 December 2022	2022 Junior Oceania Cup	Canberra, Australia	2	Australia; New Zealand
12–16 March 2023	2023 Junior Africa Cup	Ismailia, Egypt	2	South Africa; Zimbabwe
10–18 April 2023	2023 Junior Pan American Championship	Bridgetown, Barbados	3	United States; Argentina; Canada
2–11 June 2023	2023 Junior Asia Cup	Kakamigahara, Japan	3	India; South Korea; Japan
Total			16	

== Umpires ==
The following 14 umpires were selected on 30 March.

- Veronica Villafañe (ARG)
- Kristy Robertson (AUS)
- Magali Sergeant (BEL)
- Chen Jianjun (CHN)
- Sandra Adell (ESP)
- Durga Devi (IND)
- Minami Inamoto (JPN)
- Junko Wagatsuma (JPN)
- Kim Jung-hee (KOR)
- Kamilė Mockaitytė (LTU)
- Lizelotte Wolter (NED)
- Katrina Turner (NZL)
- Victoria Pazos (PAR)
- Melissa Taylor (RSA)

== Preliminary round ==
Pools and fixtures were established on the basis of the FIH Junior World Rankings, introduced in 2023.

All times are local (UTC−04:00).

=== Pool A ===
Pos	Team	Pld	W	D	L	GF	GA	GD	Pts	Qualification
1	Netherlands	3	2	1	0	15	2	+13	7	Quarter–finals
2	Australia	3	2	1	0	8	2	+6	7	Quarter–finals
3	Chile (H)	3	1	0	2	1	9	−8	3	
4	South Africa	3	0	0	3	0	11	−11	0	

Source: FIH
Rules for classification: 1) points; 2) matches won; 3) goal difference; 4) goals for; 5) head-to-head result; 6) field goals scored.
(H) Hosts

29 November 2023
12:00

Netherlands	2–2	Australia
Moes 40'; Beljaars 57'	Report	Stewart 12'; Brooks 54'

Umpires:
Katrina Turner (NZL)
Magali Sergeant (BEL)

29 November 2023
20:30

South Africa	0–1	Chile
	Report	Gutiérrez 27'

Umpires:
Durga Devi (IND)
Sandra Adell (ESP)

30 November 2023
18:30

South Africa	0–6	Netherlands
	Report	Roberts 2', 18', 43'; Dicke 27'; Beljaars 39', 57'

Umpires:
Kristy Robertson (AUS)
Veronica Villafañe (ARG)

30 November 2023
20:30

Australia	2–0	Chile
Cullum-Sanders 6'; Stewart 44'	Report

Umpires:
Junko Wagatsuma (JPN)
Lizelotte Wolter (NED)

2 December 2023
17:00

Australia	4–0	South Africa
Jones 4'; Cullum-Sanders 17', 46'; Kenny 51'	Report

Umpires:
Magali Sergeant (BEL)
Minami Inamoto (JPN)

2 December 2023
19:00

Netherlands	7–0	Chile
Dicke 5'; Roberts 6'; Jansen 9'; Beljaars 26', 51'; Winter 31'; Van den Nieuwenhof 60'	Report

Umpires:
Sandra Adell (ESP)
Veronica Villafañe (ARG)

=== Pool B ===
Pos	Team	Pld	W	D	L	GF	GA	GD	Pts	Qualification
1	Argentina	3	3	0	0	18	0	+18	9	Quarter–finals
2	Spain	3	2	0	1	10	2	+8	6	Quarter–finals
3	South Korea	3	1	0	2	7	5	+2	3	
4	Zimbabwe	3	0	0	3	0	28	−28	0	

Source: FIH
Rules for classification: 1) points; 2) matches won; 3) goal difference; 4) goals for; 5) head-to-head result; 6) field goals scored.

29 November 2023
10:00

South Korea	6–0	Zimbabwe
Park Mi-g. 9'; Lee S. 30'; An 34'; Jeong 43'; Choi N. 55'; Choi J. 58'	Report

Umpires:
Chen Jianjun (CHN)
Victoria Pazos (PAR)

29 November 2023
16:30

Argentina	1–0	Spain
Raposo 22'	Report

Umpires:
Lizelotte Wolter (NED)
Melissa Taylor (RSA)

1 December 2023
10:00

Spain	8–0	Zimbabwe
Barba 9'; Lima 10', 12', 32'; Melero 17'; Carmona 23'; C. Fernández 49'; Sola 55'	Report

Umpires:
Veronica Villafañe (ARG)
Katrina Turner (NZL)

1 December 2023
20:30

South Korea	0–3	Argentina
	Report	Pacheco 17'; Santamarina 41'; Raposo 52'

Umpires:
Sandra Adell (ESP)
Kamilė Mockaitytė (LTU)

3 December 2023
17:00

Spain	2–1	South Korea
Carmona 30'; Sáenz de Santa María 43'	Report	An 59'

Umpires:
Magali Sergeant (BEL)
Durga Devi (IND)

3 December 2023
19:00

Argentina	14–0	Zimbabwe
Pacheco 6', 37', 53'; Díaz 9', 36'; Raposo 13', 60'; Bruggesser 19'; Ferola 32', 51'; Casas 40', 40'; Santamarina 47'; Castellaro 59'	Report

Umpires:
Kamilė Mockaitytė (LTU)
Katrina Turner (NZL)

=== Pool C ===
Pos	Team	Pld	W	D	L	GF	GA	GD	Pts	Qualification
1	Belgium	3	3	0	0	17	2	+15	9	Quarter–finals
2	Germany	3	2	0	1	12	9	+3	6	Quarter–finals
3	India	3	1	0	2	17	7	+10	3	
4	Canada	3	0	0	3	0	28	−28	0	

Source: FIH
Rules for classification: 1) points; 2) matches won; 3) goal difference; 4) goals for; 5) head-to-head result; 6) field goals scored.

29 November 2023
14:00

India	12–0	Canada
Annu 4', 6', 39'; Dipi Monika 21'; Mumtaz 26', 41', 54', 60'; Deepika 34', 50', 54'; Neelam 45'	Report

Umpires:
Minami Inamoto (JPN)
Kamilė Mockaitytė (LTU)

29 November 2023
18:30

Germany	0–6	Belgium
	Report	Bonami 15', 32', 37'; Dewaet 44', 47', 60'

Umpires:
Junko Wagatsuma (JPN)
Kristy Robertson (AUS)

30 November 2023
14:00

Belgium	8–0	Canada
Bonami 3', 49'; De Clerck 7'; Cornelissens 11'; Dewaet 36', 39'; Geerts 43', 52'	Report

Umpires:
Victoria Pazos (PAR)
Sandra Adell (ESP)

30 November 2023
16:30

India	3–4	Germany
Annu 11'; Ropni 14'; Mumtaz 24'	Report	Schwabe 17'; Plüth 21', 36'; Seidel 38'

Umpires:
Chen Jianjun (CHN)
Katrina Turner (NZL)

2 December 2023
10:00

Belgium	3–2	India
Schreurs 5'; De Mot 42'; Bonami 52'	Report	Annu 47', 51'

Umpires:
Melissa Taylor (RSA)
Chen Jianjun (CHN)

2 December 2023
12:00

Germany	8–0	Canada
Stoffelsma 14', 49', 52'; Plüth 37', 54'; Haid 43'; Boehringer 44'; Seidel 60'	Report

Umpires:
Durga Devi (IND)
Junko Wagatsuma (JPN)

=== Pool D ===
Pos	Team	Pld	W	D	L	GF	GA	GD	Pts	Qualification
1	England	3	2	0	1	11	6	+5	6	Quarter–finals
2	Japan	3	2	0	1	7	4	+3	6	Quarter–finals
3	United States	3	2	0	1	10	8	+2	6	
4	New Zealand	3	0	0	3	3	13	−10	0	

Source: FIH
Rules for classification: 1) points; 2) matches won; 3) goal difference; 4) goals for; 5) head-to-head result; 6) field goals scored.

30 November 2023
10:00

England	5–0	New Zealand
Bingham 7'; Long 26', 46'; Pocknell 52'; Alexander 56'	Report

Umpires:
Magali Sergeant (BEL)
Minami Inamoto (JPN)

30 November 2023
12:00

United States	2–1	Japan
Bruder 20', 21'	Report	Hiramitsu 13'

Umpires:
Durga Devi (IND)
Kamilė Mockaitytė (LTU)

1 December 2023
12:00

New Zealand	1–2	Japan
Reid 19'	Report	Murayama 35'; Ueno 41'

Umpires:
Melissa Taylor (RSA)
Victoria Pazos (PAR)

1 December 2023
18:30

United States	2–5	England
Mendez-Trendler 6'; Rose 19'	Report	Swain 27'; Alexander 32'; Long 36'; Axford 50'; Spavin 58'

Umpires:
Lizelotte Wolter (NED)
Kristy Robertson (AUS)

3 December 2023
10:00

England	1–4	Japan
Bingham 17'	Report	Sasaki 18', 31'; Oshima 40', 51'

Umpires:
Kristy Robertson (AUS)
Victoria Pazos (PAR)

3 December 2023
12:00

New Zealand	2–6	United States
Eades 54'; Reid 58'	Report	Mendez-Trendler 23'; Tamer 31', 50', 58'; Croon 59'; Rose 59'

Umpires:
Lizelotte Wolter (NED)
Veronica Villafañe (ARG)

== Classification round ==
=== Bracket ===
Ninth to sixteenth
5 December
Chile	2
Zimbabwe	0
5 December
United States	8
Canada	0
5 December
South Korea (p.s.o.)	1 (3)
South Africa	1 (2)
5 December
India (p.s.o.)	3 (3)
New Zealand	3 (2)

Cross-overs
7 December
Chile	1
United States	5
7 December
South Korea	1
India	3

Ninth place
9 December
United States	2 (2)
India (p.s.o.)	2 (3)
Eleventh place
9 December
Chile	1
South Korea	2

=== Ninth to sixteenth place quarter-finals ===
5 December 2023
09:00

India	3–3	New Zealand
Ropni 8'; Chhatri 17'; Sunelita 53'	Report	Story 11'; Harris 14'; Pho 49'
Penalties
Mumtaz (penalty shoot-out missed); Deepika (penalty shoot-out missed); Sakshi (penalty shoot-out scored); Rutuja (penalty shoot-out missed); Preeti (penalty shoot-out scored); Mumtaz (penalty shoot-out scored)	3–2	(penalty shoot-out scored) Cotter; (penalty shoot-out scored) Pho; (penalty shoot-out missed) Findlay; (penalty shoot-out missed) Baker; (penalty shoot-out missed) Schneideman; (penalty shoot-out missed) Cotter

Umpires:
Junko Wagatsuma (JPN)
Minami Inamoto (JPN)

5 December 2023
11:15

United States	8–0	Canada
Mendez-Trendler 10'; Bruder 38'; Adams 41'; Rose 42', 43'; Dixon 57'; Tamer 59'; Wadas 60'	Report

Umpires:
Melissa Taylor (RSA)
Chen Jianjun (CHN)

5 December 2023
18:15

South Korea	1–1	South Africa
Lee S. 12'	Report	Phume 30'
Penalties
Jeong (penalty shoot-out missed); Park Mi-h. (penalty shoot-out scored); Park S. (penalty shoot-out missed); Lee Y. (penalty shoot-out scored); An (penalty shoot-out scored)	3–2	(penalty shoot-out missed) Janse van Vuuren; (penalty shoot-out scored) Hamza; (penalty shoot-out missed) Swarts; (penalty shoot-out scored) Augousti; (penalty shoot-out missed) Isaacs

Umpires:
Kristy Robertson (AUS)
Veronica Villafañe (ARG)

5 December 2023
20:30

Chile	2–0	Zimbabwe
Muñoz 8'; Ma. Gago 23'	Report

Umpires:
Sandra Adell (ESP)
Magali Sergeant (BEL)

=== Thirteenth to sixteenth place classification ===
Cross-overs
7 December
Zimbabwe (p.s.o)	1 (4)
Canada	1 (3)
7 December
South Africa	3
New Zealand	1

Thirteenth place
9 December
Zimbabwe	1
South Africa	6
Fifteenth place
9 December
Canada	3
New Zealand	5

==== Cross-overs ====
7 December 2023
09:00

Zimbabwe	1–1	Canada
Elijah 52'	Report	Kuzyk 10'
Penalties
Elijah (penalty shoot-out scored); Zimuto (penalty shoot-out scored); Mzizi (penalty shoot-out scored); Mujiba (penalty shoot-out missed); Elijah (penalty shoot-out missed); Elijah (penalty shoot-out missed); Zimuto (penalty shoot-out scored)	4–3	(penalty shoot-out missed) Hogg; (penalty shoot-out scored) Poulakis; (penalty shoot-out missed) Gibb; (penalty shoot-out scored) Koop; (penalty shoot-out scored) Kuzyk; (penalty shoot-out missed) Poulakis; (penalty shoot-out missed) Kuzyk

Umpires:
Junko Wagatsuma (JPN)
Chen Jianjun (CHN)

7 December 2023
11:15

South Africa	3–1	New Zealand
Isaacs 21'; Phume 34'; Janse van Vuuren 52'	Report	Cotter 44'

Umpires:
Veronica Villafañe (ARG)
Kamilė Mockaitytė (LTU)

==== Fifteenth and sixteenth place ====
9 December 2023
12:15

Canada	3–5	New Zealand
Kuzyk 3'; Mathisen 27', 50'	Report	Cotter 6', 20'; Harris 23', 42'; Reid 32'

Umpires:
Minami Inamoto (JPN)
Melissa Taylor (RSA)

==== Thirteenth and fourteenth place ====
9 December 2023
14:30

Zimbabwe	1–6	South Africa
Elijah 36'	Report	Mendonça 17'; Hamza 21', 32', 47', 60'; Brisset 50'

Umpires:
Junko Wagatsuma (JPN)
Veronica Villafañe (ARG)

=== Ninth to twelfth place classification ===
==== Cross-overs ====
7 December 2023
18:15

South Korea	1–3	India
Choi J. 19'	Report	Ropni 23'; Mumtaz 44'; Annu 46'

Umpires:
Minami Inamoto (JPN)
Sandra Adell (ESP)

7 December 2023
20:30

Chile	1–5	United States
Muñoz 59'	Report	Mendez-Trendler 10'; Croon 15', 41'; Rose 15'; Bruder 60'

Umpires:
Durga Devi (IND)
Victoria Pazos (PAR)

==== Eleventh and twelfth place ====
9 December 2023
17:00

Chile	1–2	South Korea
Irazoqui 15'	Report	Park Mi-h. 17'; An 22'

Umpires:
Durga Devi (IND)
Victoria Pazos (PAR)

==== Ninth and tenth place ====
9 December 2023
19:15

United States	2–2	India
Thomassey 27', 53'	Report	Manju 11'; Sunelita 57'
Penalties
Tamer (penalty shoot-out missed); Wadas (penalty shoot-out missed); Dixon (penalty shoot-out scored); Bent-Cole (penalty shoot-out scored); Underwood (penalty shoot-out missed); Wadas (penalty shoot-out missed)	2–3	(penalty shoot-out missed) Preeti; (penalty shoot-out missed) Sakshi; (penalty shoot-out scored) Mumtaz; (penalty shoot-out missed) Annu; (penalty shoot-out scored) Rutuja; (penalty shoot-out scored) Rutuja

Umpires:
Chen Jianjun (CHN)
Katrina Turner (NZL)

== Medal round ==
=== Bracket ===
Quarter-finals
6 December
Netherlands	4
Spain	1
6 December
England	1
Germany	0
6 December
Argentina	3
Australia	1
6 December
Belgium	1
Japan	0

Semi-finals
8 December
Netherlands	8
England	1
8 December
Argentina (p.s.o)	0 (3)
Belgium	0 (1)

Final
10 December
Netherlands (p.s.o)	2 (4)
Argentina	2 (1)
Third place
10 December
England	0
Belgium	7

=== Quarter-finals ===
6 December 2023
09:00

Netherlands	4–1	Spain
Winter 3'; Beljaars 8'; Van Loon 11'; Dicke 34'	Report	Lima 42'

Umpires:
Kamilė Mockaitytė (LTU)
Katrina Turner (NZL)

6 December 2023
11:15

England	1–0	Germany
Spavin 39'	Report

Umpires:
Lizelotte Wolter (NED)
Melissa Taylor (RSA)

6 December 2023
18:15

Belgium	1–0	Japan
Schreurs 60+'	Report

Umpires:
Kristy Robertson (AUS)
Chen Jianjun (CHN)

6 December 2023
20:30

Argentina	3–1	Australia
Cairó 20'; Casas 26'; Bruggesser 52'	Report	Stewart 39'

Umpires:
Magali Sergeant (BEL)
Victoria Pazos (PAR)

=== Fifth to eighth place classification ===
Cross-overs
8 December
Spain	1
Germany	2
8 December
Australia	1
Japan	0

Fifth place
10 December
Germany	0
Australia	2
Seventh place
10 December
Spain	2
Japan	4

==== Cross-overs ====
8 December 2023
09:00

Spain	1–2	Germany
Jiménez 30'	Report	Fischer 14'; Haid 30+'

Umpires:
Kristy Robertson (AUS)
Kamilė Mockaitytė (LTU)

8 December 2023
11:15

Australia	1–0	Japan
Stewart 59'	Report

Umpires:
Katrina Turner (NZL)
Durga Devi (IND)

==== Seventh and eighth place ====
10 December 2023
12:15

Spain	2–4	Japan
Pérez 6'; Jiménez 15'	Report	Hayasuke 11', 26'; Matsunami 18'; Sasaki 34'

Umpires:
Kamilė Mockaitytė (LTU)
Chen Jianjun (CHN)

==== Fifth and sixth place ====
10 December 2023
14:30

Germany	0–2	Australia
	Report	A. Lawton 25'; Young 33'

Umpires:
Sandra Adell (ESP)
Minami Inamoto (JPN)

=== First to fourth place classification ===
==== Semi-finals ====
8 December 2023
18:15

Netherlands	8–1	England
Roberts 1', 46'; Beljaars 7', 22'; Dicke 17'; Reijnen 20', 53'; De Nooijer 35'	Report	Spavin 33'

Umpires:
Magali Sergeant (BEL)
Sandra Adell (ESP)

8 December 2023
20:30

Argentina	0–0	Belgium
	Report
Penalties
Santamarina (penalty shoot-out missed); Bruggesser (penalty shoot-out scored); Pagella (penalty shoot-out scored); Raposo (penalty shoot-out scored)	3–1	(penalty shoot-out missed) Bonami; (penalty shoot-out missed) De Mot; (penalty shoot-out missed) De Clerck; (penalty shoot-out scored) Dewaet

Umpires:
Lizelotte Wolter (NED)
Melissa Taylor (RSA)

==== Third and fourth place ====
10 December 2023
17:00

England	0–7	Belgium
	Report	Bonami 7', 36', 44', 47', 58'; Dewaet 39'; De Clerck 45'

Umpires:
Lizelotte Wolter (NED)
Kristy Robertson (AUS)

==== Final ====
10 December 2023
19:15

Netherlands	2–2	Argentina
Roberts 35', 57'	Report	Díaz 20'; Raposo 29'
Penalties
Winter (penalty shoot-out scored); Moes (penalty shoot-out scored); Jansen (penalty shoot-out scored); Dicke (penalty shoot-out scored)	4–1	(penalty shoot-out missed) Díaz; (penalty shoot-out missed) Raposo; (penalty shoot-out scored) Pagella

Umpires:
Victoria Pazos (PAR)
Magali Sergeant (BEL)

== Statistics ==
=== Final standings ===
As per statistical convention in field hockey, matches decided by penalty shoot-outs are counted as draws.

Pos	Grp	Team	Pld	W	D	L	GF	GA	GD	Pts	Final result
1	A	Netherlands	6	4	2	0	29	6	+23	14	Gold medal
2	B	Argentina	6	4	2	0	23	3	+20	14	Silver medal
3	C	Belgium	6	5	1	0	25	2	+23	16	Bronze medal
4	D	England	6	3	0	3	13	21	−8	9	
5	A	Australia	6	4	1	1	12	5	+7	13	Losing quarter-finalists
6	C	Germany	6	3	0	3	14	13	+1	9	Losing quarter-finalists
7	D	Japan	6	3	0	3	11	8	+3	9	Losing quarter-finalists
8	B	Spain	6	2	0	4	14	12	+2	6	Losing quarter-finalists
9	C	India	6	2	2	2	25	13	+12	8	Crossover winners
10	D	United States	6	4	1	1	25	11	+14	13	Crossover winners
11	B	South Korea	6	2	1	3	11	10	+1	7	Crossover winners
12	A	Chile (H)	6	2	0	4	5	16	−11	6	Crossover winners
13	A	South Africa	6	2	1	3	10	14	−4	7	Crossover losers
14	B	Zimbabwe	6	0	1	5	2	37	−35	1	Crossover losers
15	D	New Zealand	6	1	1	4	12	22	−10	4	Crossover losers
16	C	Canada	6	0	1	5	4	42	−38	1	Crossover losers

Source: FIH
(H) Hosts

=== Awards ===
The following awards were given at the conclusion of the tournament.

Award	Player
Player of the tournament	(Spain) Teresa Lima
Goalkeeper of the tournament	(Argentina) Mercedes Artola
Top goalscorer	(Belgium) Astrid Bonami

=== Goalscorers ===
There were 235 goals scored in 48 matches, for an average of 4.9 goals per match.

11 goals

- (Belgium) Astrid Bonami

8 goals

- (Netherlands) Trijntje Beljaars
- (Netherlands) Mikki Roberts

7 goals

- (India) Annu

6 goals

- (Belgium) Louise Dewaet
- (India) Mumtaz Khan

5 goals

- (Argentina) Valentina Raposo
- (Germany) Laura Plüth
- (United States) Hope Rose

4 goals

- (Argentina) Daiana Pacheco
- (Australia) Tatum Stewart
- (Netherlands) Jip Dicke
- (New Zealand) Madeline Harris
- (South Africa) Malikah Hamza
- (Spain) Teresa Lima
- (United States) Charlotte Bruder
- (United States) Daniela Mendez-Trendler
- (United States) Abigail Tamer

3 goals

- (Argentina) Lara Casas
- (Argentina) Zoe Díaz
- (Australia) Hannah Cullum-Sanders
- (England) Maddie Long
- (England) Scarlett Spavin
- (Germany) Lilly Stoffelsma
- (India) Deepika Soreng
- (India) Ropni Kumari
- (Japan) Risa Sasaki
- (New Zealand) Tessa Reid
- (South Korea) An Su-jin
- (United States) Jans Croon

2 goals

- (Argentina) Brisa Bruggesser
- (Argentina) Valentina Ferola
- (Argentina) Paula Santamarina
- (Belgium) Perrine de Clerck
- (Belgium) Marthe-Marie Geerts
- (Belgium) Noa Schreurs
- (Canada) Allison Kuzyk
- (Canada) Elizabeth Mathisen
- (Chile) Constanza Muñoz
- (England) Bethan Alexander
- (England) Charlotte Bingham
- (Germany) Katharina Haid
- (India) Sunelita Toppo
- (Japan) Sana Hayasuke
- (Japan) Natsumi Oshima
- (Netherlands) Emma Reijnen
- (Netherlands) Mette Winter
- (New Zealand) Hannah Cotter
- (South Africa) Reabetswe Phume
- (South Korea) Choi Ji-yun
- (South Korea) Lee Seo-yeon
- (Spain) Sara Carmona
- (Spain) Paula Jiménez
- (United States) Kiersten Thomassey
- (Zimbabwe) Tinodiwanashe Elijah

1 goal

- (Argentina) Sofía Cairó
- (Argentina) Juana Castellaro
- (Australia) Maddison Brooks
- (Australia) Makayla Jones
- (Australia) Madeline Kenny
- (Australia) Amy Lawton
- (Australia) Grace Young
- (Belgium) Maura Cornelissens
- (Belgium) France de Mot
- (Chile) Martina Gago
- (Chile) Josefina Gutiérrez
- (Chile) Francisca Irazoqui
- (England) Madeleine Axford
- (England) Lizzie Pocknell
- (England) Claudia Swain
- (Germany) Joana Boehringer
- (Germany) Marie Fischer
- (Germany) Sophia Schwabe
- (Germany) Carolin Seidel
- (India) Manju Chorsiya
- (India) Jyoti Chhatri
- (India) Neelam
- (India) Dipi Monika Toppo
- (Japan) Ai Hiramitsu
- (Japan) Mei Matsunami
- (Japan) Hiroka Murayama
- (Japan) Maho Ueno
- (Netherlands) Eline Jansen
- (Netherlands) Isis van Loon
- (Netherlands) Guusje Moes
- (Netherlands) Noor van den Nieuwenhof
- (Netherlands) Lilli de Nooijer
- (New Zealand) Jaimee Eades
- (New Zealand) Riana Pho
- (New Zealand) Isabella Story
- (South Africa) Laikén Brisset
- (South Africa) Paris-Gail Isaacs
- (South Africa) Ané Janse van Vuuren
- (South Africa) Shanna Mendonça
- (South Korea) Choi Nu-rim
- (South Korea) Jeong Sa-ena
- (South Korea) Park Mi-gyeong
- (South Korea) Park Mi-hyang
- (Spain) Clara Barba
- (Spain) Carmen Fernández
- (Spain) Nerea Melero
- (Spain) Blanca Pérez
- (Spain) Teresa Sáenz de Santa María
- (Spain) Mar Sola
- (United States) Lucy Adams
- (United States) Katie Dixon
- (United States) Lauren Wadas

Source: FIH

== See also ==
- 2023 Men's FIH Hockey Junior World Cup
