= 2022 Women's FIH Hockey Junior World Cup squads =

Women's Hockey Junior World Cup tournament

This article lists the confirmed squads for the 2021 FIH Junior World Cup tournament to be held in Potchefstroom, South Africa between 5–16 December 2022.

== Pool A ==
=== Canada ===
The squad was announced on 15 February 2022.

Head coach: Jenn Beagan

1. Birkley Anderson
2. Jenna Berger
3. Rebecca Carvaho
4. Izzy Fraser
5. Arden Goddard-Despot
6. Nora Goddard-Despot
7. Jenna Goodman
8. Tayler Guy (GK)
9. Danielle Husar
10. McKinley Kennedy
11. Allison Kuzyk
12. Grace Leahy
13. Harnoor Malhi
14. Samantha McCrory
15. Lonica McKinney
16. Julia Ross
17. Stefanie Sajko
18. Melanie Scholz
19. Ishaval Sekhon (GK)
20. Mikayla Stelling

=== Netherlands ===
Head coach: Dave Smolenaars

1. Sarah Sinck (GK)
3. Marleen Jochems
4. Kiki Rozemeijer
5. Sophie Schelfhout
6. Daantje de Kruijff
7. Maria Steensma
9. Anne Tukkers
10. Noor Omrani
11. Luna Fokke
12. Josephine Murray
13. Sophia ter Kuile (GK)
14. Danique van der Veerdonk
16. Imme van Es
17. Teuntje de Wit
18. Floor de Haan
19. Mette Winter
20. Jip Dicke
21. Tessa Beetsma
23. Rosa Fernig (C)
24. Noor de Baat

=== United States ===
Head coach: Tracey Paul

2. Ashley Sessa
3. Kathryn Peterson
4. Leah Crouse
5. Emma DeBerdine
6. Hope Rose
7. Lindsay Dickinson
8. Caroline Ramsey
9. Isabella Bressler
10. Charlotte de Vries
11. Kayla Blas
12. Lauren Wadas
13. Abigail Tamer
14. Gracyn Banks
15. Katie Dixon
16. Riley Donnelly
17. Josie Varney
18. Alia Marshall (C)
24. Margo Carlin
30. Annabel Skubisz (GK)
31. Madison Kahn (GK)

=== Zimbabwe ===
The squad was announced on 28 February 2022.

Head coach: Tendayi Maredza

1. Jenna Mathieson (GK)
2. Gugulethu Sibanda
3. Taya Trivella
4. Courtney Lowe
5. Rumbidzai Zimuto
6. Alexi Terblanche
7. Simone Herbst
8. Mazvita Mtausi-Gwaradzimba
9. Georgia Allardice
10. Lilian Pope
11. Mutsa Bera (C)
12. Kaylee Sithole
13. Jorja Jones
14. Natalie Terblanche
15. Khanyisile Mzizi
16. Hayley Clark
17. Mercedes Beekes
18. Lavender Mandoza (GK)
21. Tinodiwanashe Elijah
22. Tatenda Maswera

== Pool B ==
=== England ===
The squad was announced on 17 March 2022.

Head coach: Simon Letchford

5. Mollie Mason
6. Emily Guckian
7. Emma Allroggen
8. Evie Wood (GK)
9. Sofia Martin
10. Rebecca Manton
11. Lorna Mackenzie
12. Bethan Alexander
13. Camilla Giglio (C)
14. Mila Welch (GK)
15. Bronty Brough
16. Matilda Butterworth
19. Madeleine Axford
20. Kitty Chapple
21. Victoria McCabe
22. Ella Burnley
23. Katie Curtis
24. Georgina Gardens
26. Claudia Swain
27. Madeleine Long

=== Ireland ===
The squad was announced on 17 November 2021.

Head coach: David Passmore

1. Eloise McLoughlin (GK)
2. Holly Micklem (GK)
5. Emma Paul
6. Ellen Reid
7. Sophia Cole
8. Nadia Benallal
9. Charlotte Beggs
10. Aoife Taaffe
12. Siofra O'Brien
13. Siofra Murdoch
15. Rachel Kelly
20. Caoimhe Perdue (C)
21. Amy Elliott
22. Anna Horan
24. Yasmin Pratt
25. Caitlin Sherin (C)
26. Christina Hamill
28. Lisa Mulcahy
30. Sarah McAuley
31. Katie-Jane Marshall

=== South Africa ===
The squad was announced on 10 March 2021.

Head coach: Lenise Marais

2. Mathapelo Ramasimong (C)
3. Angela Welham
4. Mikkela le Roux
5. Jacolene McLaren
7. Kayla de Waal
8. Hanrie Louw
9. Tamlyn Kock
10. Bianca Wood
11. Edith Molikoe
12. Chante Ferreira
14. Onthatile Zulu (C)
15. Jeanri Thomas
16. Sare Laubscher
17. Cailynn den Bakker
19. Caylin Maree
20. Laylaa Davids
21. Amelie Claasen (GK)
22. Mishka Ellis (GK)
23. Jean-Leigh du Toit
25. Zimkhitha Weston

== Pool C ==
=== Argentina ===
Head coach: Fernando Ferrara

1. Lourdes Pérez (GK)
3. Mariana Pineda
4. Sofía Cairó
5. Celina Di Santo
6. Victoria Miranda
7. Juliana Guggini
8. María Cerundolo
9. Brisa Bruggesser
11. María Adorno
12. Ana Luz Dodorico (GK)
14. Daiana Pacheco
16. Sol Pagella
17. Paula Santamarina
18. Catalina Andrade
20. Valentina Raposo
21. Camila Raposo
23. María Larsen
24. Victoria Manuele
25. Juana Castellaro
27. Francisca Concetti

=== Austria ===
Head coach: Corinna Zerbs

1. Corinna Stedronsky (GK)
2. Carla Kemper
5. Helene Herzog
6. Johanna Czech (C)
7. Marilena Monghy
11. Katharina Bauer
12. Amelie Minar
13. Leonie Koderhold
14. Liv Heindl
15. Katharina Proksch
16. Sophia Klaus
18. Hannah Szladits
19. Laura Kern
23. Lena Buchta
25. Fiona Felber (C)
28. Nathalie Matousek
29. Isabella Klausbruckner
30. Sabrina Hruby
32. Fabienne Gnehm (GK)
33. Maja Halasz (GK)
34. Franziska Frey
35. Josefa Frey
36. Leonie Pohl
37. Anja Haselsteiner

=== South Korea ===
The squad was announced on 28 February 2022.

Head coach: Hwang Nam-young

1. Kim Eun-Ji (GK)
2. Kim Hyo-Bi
3. Kim Jung-Ju
5. Oh You-Min
6. An Su-Jin
7. Park Yeong-Eun
8. Park Mi-Hyang
9. Choi Nu-Rim
10. Gwon Jug-Yeong (C)
11. Son Hyer-Young
12. Jung Sung-Hee
13. Lee Yu-Jin
16. Lee Ji-Won (GK)
17. Lee Ju-Yeon
18. Ji Yu-Jin
19. Kwark Ye-Rang
21. Park Yoo-Rim
23. Lee Ga-Eun

=== Uruguay ===
Head coach: Andrés Vázquez

1. Federica Turiel (GK)
2. Sol Myszka
3. Martina Rago
4. Elisa Civetta
5. Pilar Oliveros
7. Agustina Martínez
9. Magdalena Verga
10. Manuela Quiñones
11. Agustina Díaz
12. Lucía Santucci
13. Guadalupe Curutchague
15. Lola Delafond
17. Manuela Vidal
18. Rafaela Canepa
19. Lucía Dieste
20. Josefina Marí
22. Agustina Suárez
23. Guadalupe Fernández
24. Carolina Curicó
32. María Bate (C, GK)

== Pool D ==
=== India ===
The squad was announced on 17 March 2022.

Head coach: (Netherlands) Erik Wonink

2. Priyanka Wankhede
3. Deepika Sehrawat
4. Preeti Panchal
7. Sharmila Devi
9. Mumtaz Khan
11. Khushboo Khan (GK)
14. Reet Rajput
15. Jiwan Kishori Toppo
16. Ajmina Kujur
17. Bichu Devi Kharibam (GK)
19. Vaishnavi Phalke
20. Lalremsiami Hmarzote
23. Marina Lalramnghaki
25. Beauty Dungdung
27. Lalrindiki
30. Salima Tete (C)
42. Akshata Dhekale
50. Ishika Chaudhary
58. Sangita Kumari
64. Baljeet Kaur

=== Germany ===
Head coach: Akim Bouchouchi

1. Mali Wichmann (GK)
2. Chiara Vischer (GK)
4. Julia Hemmerle
6. Nike Beckhaus
7. Inma Hofmeister
8. Jule Bleuel
9. Pauline Heinz
10. Verena Neumann
11. Sara Strauss
13. Aina Kresken
14. Emily Günther
16. Lena Frerichs
17. Lisa Nolte (C)
18. Sophia Schwabe
19. Lilly Stoffelsma
23. Carlotta Sippel
24. Linnea Weidemann
26. Felicia Wiedermann
27. Stine Kurz
28. Jette Fleschütz

=== Malaysia ===
Head coach: Nasihin Ibrahim

1. Siti Nasir (GK)
3. Putri Nor
4. Effarizal Insyirah
5. Abang Dayang
7. Nur Mohamad
10. Siti Mohd
11. Nur Azhar
15. Iren Hussin
16. Mashitah Ab (GK)
17. Nor Isahhidun
18. Khalim Nurul
19. Nurfatin Mohd
22. Siti Husain
24. Nurul Azman
25. Khairunnisa Mohd
26. Nuramirah Zulkifli
27. Nurmaizatulhanim Syafi (C)
29. Kirandeep Gurdip
32. Elizaberth Anak
33. Nur Yussaini

=== Wales ===
The squad was announced on 10 March 2022.

Head coach: Walid Abdo

9. Maisie Riley
16. Emily Drysdale
18. Isabelle Howell (C)
31. Louise Loughlin
33. Alanah O'Brien (GK)
34. Millie Holme
35. Bethan Wood
36. Cerys Preston
39. Sophie Gorman
42. Rebecca Daniel
44. Ffion Horrell (GK)
48. Stephanie Beaumont
52. Millie Walters
54. Jessica Hill
55. Georgina Pitts
59. Madeleine Goodman
61. Jessica Parkinson
63. Beth Munro-Morris
70. Ava Dempsey
71. Betsan Thomas
