= 2018 Pan American Youth Olympic Games Qualifier (girls' field hockey) =

2018 Youth Pan American Championship

Tournament details
- Host country: Mexico
- City: Guadalajara
- Dates: 12 – 17 March 2018
- Teams: 6

Final positions
- Champions: Argentina (3rd title)
- Runner-up: Uruguay
- Third place: Mexico

Tournament statistics
- Matches played: 20
- Goals scored: 145 (7.25 per match)
- Top scorer: (Argentina) Celina Di Santo (15 goals)

The 2018 Pan American Youth Olympic Games Qualifier for girls' field hockey, also known as 2018 Youth Pan American Championship, was the third edition of the Youth Pan American Championship, an international field hockey competition held from 12 – 17 March 2018 in Guadalajara, Mexico.

The tournament also served as a direct qualifier for the 2018 Summer Youth Olympics, with the winner and runner-up qualifying. However, since Argentina has already qualified as the hosts, but also won this competition, the second and third-placed teams (Uruguay and Mexico) qualified for the Summer Youth Olympics.

== Qualified teams ==
- Argentina
- Guatemala
- Jamaica
- Mexico
- Paraguay
- Uruguay

== Format ==
The six teams will all be competing in one pool. The top four teams advance to the semifinals to determine the winner in a knockout system. The bottom two teams play for the 5th/6th place.

Each game lasts for 20 minutes

== Results ==
All times are local (UTC−05:00).

=== Preliminary round ===
==== Pool A ====
Pos	Team	Pld	W	D	L	GF	GA	GD	Pts	Qualification
1	Argentina	5	5	0	0	50	1	+49	15	Semifinals
2	Uruguay	5	4	0	1	34	9	+25	12	Semifinals
3	Mexico	5	3	0	2	19	10	+9	9	Semifinals
4	Paraguay	5	2	0	3	9	23	−14	6	Semifinals
5	Jamaica	5	0	1	4	2	35	−33	1	
6	Guatemala	5	0	1	4	2	38	−36	1	

Source: FIH
Rules for classification: 1) points; 2) goal difference; 3) goals scored; 4) head-to-head result.

12 March 2018
08:30

Argentina	12–0	Guatemala
Miranda 3', 5' di Santo 7', 9', 16', 20'; Cerundolo 15', 18'; Palet 17', 20'; Ramallo 18', 19'	Report

Umpires:
Victoria Pazos (PAR)
Nancy Altamirano (MEX)

12 March 2018
09:15

Uruguay	10–0	Jamaica
Dieste 3', 17'; Civetta 7'; Jover 8', 14'; Santucci 9'; Oliveros 11', 19'; Arias 14', 15'	Report

Umpires:
Mary Driscoll (USA)
Margaux Brand (CAN)

12 March 2018
10:00

Mexico	5–0	Paraguay
Rivera 2', 4'; Gutiérrez 7'; Cuevas 12'; Sosa 15'	Report

Umpires:
Denise Pelletier (CAN)
Diana Borrayo (GUA)

12 March 2018
14:00

Argentina	15–0	Jamaica
Cerundolo 2'; Bruggesser 3', 20'; Palet 4', 14' di Santo 6', 10', 13', 15', 18'; Ramallo 6', 12'; Arcidiacono 7'; Miranda 9', 19'	Report

Umpires:
Nancy Altamirano (MEX)
Mary Driscoll (USA)

12 March 2018
14:45

Uruguay	7–0	Paraguay
Jover 2', 7', 14', 15'; Dieste 4'; Oliveros 10', 18'	Report

Umpires:
Diana Borrayo (GUA)
Maria Locatelli (ARG)

12 March 2018
15:30

Guatemala	0–7	Mexico
	Report	Cuevas 5', 9'; Sosa 7', 20'; Romero 15'; Rivera 18'; Gonzalez 19'

Umpires:
Margaux Brand (CAN)
Denise Pelletier (CAN)

13 March 2018
09:00

Guatemala	0–13	Uruguay
	Report	Dieste 3', 14', 19', 20'; Oliveros 4', 9', 13'; Santucci 5'; Martinez 10'; Civetta 11', 20'; Verga 15'; Arias 18'

Umpires:
Margaux Brand (CAN)
Denise Pelletier (CAN)

13 March 2018
09:45

Paraguay	4–1	Jamaica
Sanchez 8'; Samudio 10'; Roa 15'; Rodriguez 17'	Report	Doyley 19'

Umpires:
Maria Locatelli (ARG)
Mary Driscoll (USA)

13 March 2018
10:30

Mexico	1–6	Argentina
Ramírez 19'	Report	Bruggesser 5'; Cerundolo 7'; Palet 7'; Ramallo 9', 19'; Arcidiacono 15'

Umpires:
Victoria Pazos (PAR)
Denise Pelletier (CAN)

13 March 2018
15:15

Paraguay	5–1	Guatemala
Roa 1', 12'; Samudio 17', 19'; Rodriguez 20'	Report	Flores 15'

Umpires:
Marguax Brand (CAN)
Nancy Altamirano (MEX)

13 March 2018
16:00

Uruguay	0–8	Argentina
	Report	Cerundolo 2', 12'; Bruggesser 8', 16'; Palet 9', 19' di Santo 10', 18'

Umpires:
Victoria Pazos (PAR)
Mary Driscoll (USA)

13 March 2018
16:45

Jamaica	0–5	Mexico
	Report	Sosa 2', 4', 20'; Ramírez 15'; Rivera 17'

Umpires:
Maria Locatelli (ARG)
Diana Borrayo (GUA)

14 March 2018
14:00

Argentina	9–0	Paraguay
Palet 2', 7', 17'; Bruggesser 4', 18' di Santo 6'; Ramallo 9'; Miranda 15'; Cerundolo 19'	Report

Umpires:
Mary Driscoll (USA)
Marguax Brand (CAN)

14 March 2018
15:00

Jamaica	1–1	Guatemala
Linton 7'	Report	Flores 16'

Umpires:
Victoria Pazos (PAR)
Nancy Altamirano (MEX)

14 March 2018
16:00

Mexico	1–4	Uruguay
Gonzalez 2'	Report	Santucci 3', 8'; Arias 17'; Dieste 18'

Umpires:
Maria Locatelli (ARG)
Denise Pelletier (CAN)

=== Fifth/sixth place classification ===
17 March 2018
11:00

Jamaica	3–1	Guatemala
Williams 15'; Linton 16'; Gilespie 18'	Report	García 14'

Umpires:
Marguax Brand (CAN)
Nancy Altamirano (MEX)

=== First to fourth place classification ===
Semi-finals
16 March 2018
Argentina	11
Paraguay	0
16 March 2018
Uruguay	3
Mexico	1

Final
17 March 2018
Argentina	4
Uruguay	0
Third place
17 March 2018
Paraguay	0
Mexico	6

==== Semifinals ====
16 March 2018
15:00

Argentina	11–0	Paraguay
di Santo 1', 14'; Ramallo 2'; Palet 3', 13'; Miranda 6', 18'; Cerundolo 8', 19'; Arcidiacono 8'; Bruggesser 15'	Report

Umpires:
Denise Pelletier (CAN)
Nancy Altamirano (MEX)

16 March 2018
16:00

Uruguay	3–1	Mexico
Jover 5'; Dieste 15'; Verga 19'	Report	Sosa 9'

Umpires:
Maria Locatelli (ARG)
Victoria Pazos (PAR)

==== Third and fourth place ====
17 March 2018
14:00

Paraguay	0–6	Mexico
	Report	Gonzalez 1', 4'; Rivera 8'; Verdugo 12'; Sosa 14', 16'

Umpires:
Mary Driscoll (USA)
Maria Locatelli (ARG)

==== Final ====
17 March 2018
16:00

Argentina	4–0	Uruguay
Arcidiacono 6' di Santo 9'; Miranda 16'; Cerundolo 18'	Report

Umpires:
Denise Pelletier (CAN)
Victoria Pazos (PAR)

== Final standings ==
Rank	Team
Gold medal	Argentina
Silver medal	Uruguay
Bronze medal	Mexico
4	Paraguay
5	Jamaica
6	Guatemala

== See also ==
- 2018 Pan American Youth Olympic Games Qualifier (boys' field hockey)
