= 2025 Women's EuroHockey Club Trophy I =

Women's EuroHockey Club Trophy

Tournament details
- Host country: Czechia
- City: Rakovník
- Dates: 18–21 April
- Teams: 7
- Venue: HC 1972 Rakovník

Final positions
- Champions: (England) Hampstead & Westminster (1st title)
- Runner-up: (Scotland) Watsonians
- Third place: (Republic of Ireland) Loreto

Tournament statistics
- Matches played: 12
- Goals scored: 59 (4.92 per match)
- Top scorer(s): (France) Carolina Carrizo (Scotland) Katherine Holdgate (Scotland) Sarah Jamieson (3 goals)

The 2025 Women's EuroHockey Club Trophy is the 48th edition of the women's Women's EuroHockey Club Trophy, Europe's secondary club field hockey tournament organized by the EHF. It is currently being held from 18 to 21 April 2025 at HC 1972 Rakovník in Rakovník, Czechia.

== Teams ==
The following eight teams competed for the title:

- (Czech Republic) Rakovník
- (England) Hampstead & Westminster
- (France) Cambrai
- (Republic of Ireland) Loreto
- (Italy) Amiscora
- (Scotland) Watsonians
- (Switzerland) Rotweiss Wettingen

== Preliminary round ==
=== Pool A ===
Pos	Team	Pld	W	D	L	GF	GA	GD	Pts	Qualification
1	(England) Hampstead & Westminster (Q)	2	2	0	0	6	0	+6	10	Advanced to Final
2	(Republic of Ireland) Loreto	2	1	0	1	5	2	+3	6	
3	(Italy) Amiscora	2	0	0	2	1	10	−9	0	

Source: EHF
Rules for classification: 1) Points; 2) Goal difference; 3) Goals scored; 4) Games won; 5) Head-to-head.
(Q) Qualified for the phase indicated

18 April 2025
12:45

Hampstead & Westminster (England)	1–0	(Republic of Ireland) Loreto
De Ledesma 12'	Report

Umpires:
Katie Howie (SCO)
Anatole Platel (FRA)

19 April 2025
12:30

Amiscora (Italy)	0–5	(England) Hampstead & Westminster
	Report	Tynan 10'; Lench 14'; Martin 15'; Isherwood 49'; Burge 49'

Umpires:
Anatole Platel (FRA)
Julia Wagner (SUI)

20 April 2025
12:15

Loreto (Republic of Ireland)	5–1	(Italy) Amiscora
O'Brien 3'; Sherin 15', 36', 52'; Kelly 16'	Report	Valenti 56'

Umpires:
Vivian Carveth (ENG)
Alexandr Toth (CZE)

=== Pool B ===
Pos	Team	Pld	W	D	L	GF	GA	GD	Pts	Qualification
1	(Scotland) Watsonians	3	3	0	0	17	1	+16	15	Advanced to Final
2	(France) Cambrai	3	1	1	1	7	6	+1	8	
3	(Czech Republic) Rakovník (H)	3	1	0	2	4	13	−9	5	
4	(Switzerland) Rotweiss Wettingen	3	0	1	2	1	9	−8	3	

Source: EHF
Rules for classification: 1) Points; 2) Goal difference; 3) Goals scored; 4) Games won; 5) Head-to-head.
(H) Hosts

18 April 2025
15:00

Rotweiss Wettingen (Switzerland)	1–1	(France) Cambrai
Schnyder 2'	Report	Carizzo 17'

Umpires:
Vivian Carveth (ENG)
Aaron Saunders (IRE)

18 April 2025
17:15

Watsonians (Scotland)	8–0	(Czech Republic) Rakovník
Logan 15', 60'; Jamieson 18', 42'; Holdgate 19', 53'; Dark 49', 60'	Report

Umpires:
Noemi Di Bella (ITA)
Daniel Stewart (ENG)

19 April 2025
14:30

Rotweiss Wettingen (Switzerland)	0–6	(Scotland) Watsonians
	Report	Jamieson 7', 27', 29'; Hussell 17'; Small 18'; Berndes-Cade 54'

Umpires:
Alexandr Toth (CZE)
Daniel Stewart (ENG)

19 April 2025
16:45

Rakovník (Czech Republic)	2–5	(France) Cambrai
Přibíková 21'; Vorlová 57'	Report	Carizzo 33', 43', 47', 48'; Béthune 37'

Umpires:
Vivian Carveth (ENG)
Katie Howie (SCO)

20 April 2025
14:30

Watsonians (Scotland)	3–1	(France) Cambrai
Dark 23'; Holdgate 29', 57'	Report	Bracq 15'

Umpires:
Julia Wagner (SUI)
Aaron Saunders (IRE)

20 April 2025
16:45

Rakovník (Czech Republic)	2–0	(Switzerland) Rotweiss Wettingen
Matoušková 29'; Hanzlová 36'	Report

Umpires:
Noemi Di Bella (ITA)
Daniel Stewart (ENG)

== Classification round ==
=== Fifth and sixth place ===
21 April 2025
09:15

Amiscora (Italy)	3–3	(Czech Republic) Rakovník
Grinbaum 1', 15'; Valenti 20'	Report	Matoušková 13'; Vorlová 26'; Přibíková 50'
Penalties
Fiorelli (penalty shoot-out scored); Stagno (penalty shoot-out missed); Grinbaum (penalty shoot-out scored); Valenti (penalty shoot-out missed); Khilko (penalty shoot-out scored); Fiorelli (penalty shoot-out scored)	4–3	(penalty shoot-out scored) Vorlová; (penalty shoot-out missed) Hanzlová; (penalty shoot-out scored) Daňková; (penalty shoot-out scored) Přibíková; (penalty shoot-out missed) Matoušková; (penalty shoot-out missed) Vorlová

Umpires:
Aaron Saunders (IRE)
Julia Wagner (SUI)

=== Third and fourth place ===
21 April 2025
11:30

Loreto (Republic of Ireland)	6–1	(France) Cambrai
Jennings 15'; O'Brien 18', 40'; Sherin 21'; Fitzpatrick 24', 38'	Report	Fontaine 37'

Umpires:
Katie Howie (SCO)
Alexandr Toth (CZE)

=== Final ===
21 April 2025
13:45

Hampstead & Westminster (England)	3–2	(Scotland) Watsonians
Hamilton 8', 11'; Lench 60'	Report	Wilson 9'; Holdgate 54'

Umpires:
Anatole Platel (FRA)
Noemi Di Bella (ITA)

== See also ==
- 2025 Men's EuroHockey Club Trophy I
- 2025 Women's Euro Hockey League
