= 2022 Women's FIH Hockey Junior World Cup =

Field hockey tournament

Junior Hockey World Cup 2022

Tournament details
- Host country: South Africa
- City: Potchefstroom
- Dates: 1–12 April
- Teams: 15 (from 4 confederations)
- Venue: NWU Astro

Final positions
- Champions: Netherlands (4th title)
- Runner-up: Germany
- Third place: England

Tournament statistics
- Matches played: 44
- Goals scored: 202 (4.59 per match)
- Top scorer: (Netherlands) Jip Dicke (13 goals)
- Best player: (Germany) Stine Kurz
- Best goalkeeper: (Germany) Mali Wichmann

The 2022 Women's FIH Hockey Junior World Cup is the ninth edition of the Women's FIH Hockey Junior World Cup, the biennial women's under-21 field hockey world championship organized by the International Hockey Federation.

It was scheduled to be held from 5 to 16 December 2021 in Potchefstroom, South Africa. Because of a new COVID-19 variant, the tournament was put on hold on 26 November 2021 and later postponed, with the option to be hosted by South Africa. On 10 January 2022 it was announced the tournament will take place from 2 to 13 April 2022 at the original venue. In February the tournament was moved one day forward to start on 1 and end on 12 April 2022.

Argentina were the defending champions. They were defeated 4–1 in the quarter-finals by Germany. The Netherlands won a record fourth title by defeating Germany 3–1 in the final.

== Qualification ==
A total of 16 teams qualified for the final tournament. In addition to South Africa, who qualified automatically as hosts, 15 other teams qualified from five separate continental competitions.

Dates	Event	Location	Quotas	Qualifier(s)
13–21 July 2019	2019 EuroHockey Junior Championship	Valencia, Spain	3	~~Belgium~~; England; Germany; Netherlands; ~~Russia~~^{[5]} ~~Spain~~
17 February 2020	Host	—N/a	1	South Africa
Cancelled^{[1]}	2021 Junior Africa Cup	Windhoek, Namibia	1	Zimbabwe
Cancelled^{[2]}	2021 Junior Asia Cup	Kakamigahara, Japan	2	~~China~~; India; ~~Japan~~; South Korea
21–28 August 2021	2021 Junior Pan American Championship	Santiago, Chile	3	Canada; United States; Uruguay
Cancelled^{[3]}	2021 Junior Oceania Cup	—N/a	0	~~Australia~~; ~~New Zealand~~
24 September 2021^{[3]}	Invitational	—N/a	2	Argentina; Ireland
10 February 2022^{[4]}	Invitational	—N/a	2	Malaysia; ~~Ukraine~~^{[6]} Wales
9 March 2022^{[5]}	Invitational	—N/a	1	Austria
Total			15	

^[1] – Due to the COVID-19 pandemic, the African Hockey Federation were forced to cancel the Junior Africa Cup. As a result, Zimbabwe were award the second African quota as they were 2016 runner–up.

^[2] – Due to the COVID-19 pandemic, the Asian Hockey Federation had decided to cancel the 2021 Men's Hockey Junior Asia Cup and 2021 Women's Hockey Junior Asia Cup. Thus AHF designed a system to decide who earns the quota place for Asia. Where in the end China, India, and Japan were awarded the three quota places for the women's tournament. China later withdrew, being replaced by South Korea.

^[3] – Due to the COVID-19 pandemic, Australia and New Zealand decided to cancel the 2021 Junior Oceania Cup. The FIH replaced them with Argentina and Ireland.

^[4] – Following a rescheduling of the event, Belgium, Japan, the Netherlands and Spain withdrew from the tournament. After negotiations with the FIH however, the Netherlands rejoined the competition, with Malaysia, Ukraine and Wales replacing the remaining teams.

^[5] – On 1 March 2022, the FIH announced the exclusion of Russia from the event. Following advice from the International Olympic Committee, international sporting bodies were advised to avoid participation of Russian athletes in all sports in light of the Russian invasion of Ukraine. The FIH also offered full support to Ukraine in the hopes they will still be able to participate. Austria replaced them.

^[6] – Ukraine withdrew on 29 March 2022 due to the 2022 Russian invasion of Ukraine.

== Umpires ==
The following 14 umpires were selected on 30 March by the FIH:

- Maria Locatelli (ARG)
- Céline Martin-Schmets (BEL)
- Catalina Montesino (CHI)
- Ivona Makar (CRO)
- Rebecca Woodcock (ENG)
- Inès El Hajem (FRA)
- Sophie Bockelmann (GER)
- Alison Keogh (IRL)
- Ilaria Amorosini (ITA)
- Lisette Baljon (NED)
- Victoria Pazos (PAR)
- Wanri Venter (RSA)
- Kim Yoon-seon (KOR)
- Gema Calderón (ESP)

== Preliminary round ==
All times are local (UTC+2).

=== Pool A ===
Pos	Team	Pld	W	D	L	GF	GA	GD	Pts	Qualification
1	Netherlands	3	3	0	0	38	0	+38	9	Quarter-finals
2	United States	3	2	0	1	9	9	0	6	Quarter-finals
3	Zimbabwe	3	1	0	2	2	24	−22	3	
4	Canada	3	0	0	3	1	17	−16	0	

Source: FIH
Rules for classification: 1) points; 2) matches won; 3) goal difference; 4) goals for; 5) head-to-head result; 6) field goals scored.

1 April 2022
13:00

Netherlands	9–0	United States
Fokke 4', 34', 51'; Omrani 12'; De Baat 15'; Dicke 15'; Fernig 40'; Jochems 56'; Winter 59'	Report

Umpires:
Alison Keogh (IRL)
Wanri Venter (RSA)

1 April 2022
15:00

Canada	1–2	Zimbabwe
Goodman 58'	Report	A. Terblanche 5'; Pope 24'

Umpires:
Kim Yoon-seon (KOR)
Inès El Hajem (FRA)

2 April 2022
13:00

United States	5–0	Zimbabwe
De Vries 23'; Rose 39', 42', 48', 55'	Report

Umpires:
Ilaria Amorosini (ITA)
Sophie Bockelmann (GER)

2 April 2022
15:00

Canada	0–11	Netherlands
	Report	Winter 5'; Dicke 7', 37', 44', 48'; Fokke 13', 32', 53'; De Wit 29'; Beetsma 30', 52'

Umpires:
Catalina Montesino (CHI)
Gema Calderón (ESP)

4 April 2022
15:30

Netherlands	18–0	Zimbabwe
Fokke 3', 26'; Dicke 16', 18', 24', 29', 60'; Omrani 16', 34', 52'; Beetsma 19'; Steensma 23', 33', 52'; Murray 32', 41'; Rozemeijer 34'; Winter 59'	Report

Umpires:
Maria Locatelli (ARG)
Victoria Pazos (PAR)

4 April 2022
17:30

United States	4–0	Canada
Donnelly 8'; Ramsey 42'; Rose 51'; Peterson 57'	Report

Umpires:
Rebecca Woodcock (ENG)
Lisette Baljon (NED)

=== Pool B ===
Pos	Team	Pld	W	D	L	GF	GA	GD	Pts	Qualification
1	England	2	2	0	0	5	1	+4	6	Quarter-finals
2	South Africa (H)	2	1	0	1	1	3	−2	3	Quarter-finals
3	Ireland	2	0	0	2	1	3	−2	0	
4	Ukraine (Note: Ukraine withdrew on due to the 2022 Russian invasion of Ukraine.)	0	0	0	0	0	0	0	0	Withdrawn

Source: FIH
Rules for classification: 1) points; 2) matches won; 3) goal difference; 4) goals for; 5) head-to-head result; 6) field goals scored.
(H) Hosts
Notes:

1 April 2022
11:00

England	3–0	South Africa
Mackenzie 13', 56'; Giglio 45'	Report

Umpires:
Lisette Baljon (NED)
Victoria Pazos (PAR)

2 April 2022
19:00

Ireland	1–2	England
Perdue 4'	Report	Giglio 9'; McCabe 43'

Umpires:
Ivona Makar (CRO)
Céline Martin-Schmets (BEL)

4 April 2022
11:00

South Africa	1–0	Ireland
Du Toit 30'	Report

Umpires:
Kim Yoon-seon (KOR)
Sophie Bockelmann (GER)

=== Pool C ===
Pos	Team	Pld	W	D	L	GF	GA	GD	Pts	Qualification
1	Argentina	3	3	0	0	14	0	+14	9	Quarter-finals
2	South Korea	3	1	0	2	1	3	−2	3	Quarter-finals
3	Uruguay	3	1	0	2	1	5	−4	3	
4	Austria (Note: Austria replaced Russia, who was excluded on 3 March 2022, due to the Russian invasion to Ukraine.^{[5]})	3	1	0	2	1	9	−8	3	

Source: FIH
Rules for classification: 1) points; 2) matches won; 3) goal difference; 4) goals for; 5) head-to-head result; 6) field goals scored.
Notes:

1 April 2022
17:00

South Korea	1–0	Uruguay
Jung 56'	Report

Umpires:
Rebecca Woodcock (ENG)
Ivona Makar (CRO)

1 April 2022
19:00

Argentina	8–0	Austria
Pacheco 5', 50', 57'; Adorno 7'; V. Raposo 30', 55'; Pagella 44'; Bruggesser 48'	Report

Umpires:
Céline Martin-Schmets (BEL)
Ilaria Amorosini (ITA)

3 April 2022
15:30

Austria	0–1	Uruguay
	Report	Vidal 55'

Umpires:
Catalina Montesino (CHI)
Victoria Pazos (PAR)

3 April 2022
17:30

South Korea	0–2	Argentina
	Report	Pacheco 4'; V. Raposo 23'

Umpires:
Wanri Venter (RSA)
Sophie Bockelmann (GER)

5 April 2022
09:00

Austria	1–0	South Korea
Herzog 56'	Report

Umpires:
Maria Locatelli (ARG)
Inès El Hajem (FRA)

5 April 2022
11:00

Argentina	4–0	Uruguay
Pagella 9'; V. Raposo 13'; Adorno 21'; Andrade 60'	Report

Umpires:
Alison Keogh (IRL)
Gema Calderón (ESP)

=== Pool D ===
Pos	Team	Pld	W	D	L	GF	GA	GD	Pts	Qualification
1	India	3	3	0	0	11	2	+9	9	Quarter-finals
2	Germany	3	2	0	1	19	2	+17	6	Quarter-finals
3	Wales	3	0	1	2	4	16	−12	1	
4	Malaysia	3	0	1	2	3	17	−14	1	

Source: FIH
Rules for classification: 1) points; 2) matches won; 3) goal difference; 4) goals for; 5) head-to-head result; 6) field goals scored.

2 April 2022
09:00

India	5–1	Wales
Lalremsiami 4'; Lalrindiki 32', 57'; Mumtaz 41'; Deepika 58'	Report	Holme 26'

Umpires:
Maria Locatelli (ARG)
Rebecca Woodcock (ENG)

2 April 2022
11:00

Germany	10–0	Malaysia
Kresken 6', 10', 22'; Stoffelsma 23', 43'; Fleschütz 40'; Strauss 41'; Bleuel 47'; Neumann 54'; Schwabe 60+'	Report

Umpires:
Alison Keogh (IRL)
Lisette Baljon (NED)

3 April 2022
09:00

Malaysia	3–3	Wales
Anak 15'; Nuramirah 34', 38'	Report	Howell 24'; Hill 52'; Preston 54'

Umpires:
Inès El Hajem (FRA)
Ilaria Amorosini (ITA)

3 April 2022
11:00

India	2–1	Germany
Lalremsiami 2'; Mumtaz 25'	Report	Bleuel 57'

Umpires:
Gema Calderón (ESP)
Céline Martin-Schmets (BEL)

5 April 2022
15:30

Malaysia	0–4	India
	Report	Mumtaz 10', 26', 59'; Sangita 11'

Umpires:
Ivona Makar (CRO)
Catalina Montesino (CHI)

5 April 2022
17:30

Germany	8–0	Wales
Fleschütz 3', 41'; Schwabe 7'; Sippel 7', 60'; Neumann 47'; Heinz 56'; Kurz 60'	Report

Umpires:
Kim Yoon-seon (KOR)
Wanri Venter (RSA)

== Classification round ==
=== Bracket ===
Placement
7 April
Wales	0 (3)
Austria (p.s.o.)	0 (4)
7 April
Ireland	6
Canada	1
7 April
Uruguay	1
Malaysia	2

Cross-overs
9 April
Zimbabwe	0
Austria	1
9 April
Ireland	2
Malaysia	1

Ninth place
11 April
Austria	0
Ireland	4
Eleventh place
11 April
Zimbabwe	2
Malaysia	7

=== Placement finals ===
7 April 2022
11:15

Wales	0–0	Austria
	Report
Penalties
Preston (penalty shoot-out missed); Goodman (penalty shoot-out missed); Holme (penalty shoot-out scored); Daniel (penalty shoot-out scored); Drysdale (penalty shoot-out scored); Goodman (penalty shoot-out missed)	3–4	(penalty shoot-out scored) Felber; (penalty shoot-out scored) Herzog; (penalty shoot-out missed) Kern; (penalty shoot-out missed) Proksch; (penalty shoot-out scored) Klausbruckner; (penalty shoot-out scored) Herzog

Umpires:
Gema Calderón (ESP)
Sophie Bockelmann (GER)

7 April 2022
15:45

Ireland	6–1	Canada
Kelly 1'; Hamill 11'; O'Brien 13'; Perdue 24'; Paul 26'; Pratt 39'	Report	Berger 58'

Umpires:
Maria Locatelli (ARG)
Wanri Venter (RSA)

7 April 2022
18:00

Uruguay	1–2	Malaysia
Civetta 35'	Report	Mohd 53'; Zulkifli 54'

Umpires:
Victoria Pazos (PAR)
Rebecca Woodcock (ENG)

=== Thirteenth to fifteenth place classification ===
Cross-overs
9 April
Canada	1
Uruguay	4

Thirteenth place
11 April
Wales	1
Uruguay	5

==== Cross-overs ====
9 April 2022
11:15

Canada	1–4	Uruguay
Kuzyk 59'	Report	Oliveros 33'; Civetta 36', 46'; Vidal 55'

Umpires:
Lisette Baljon (NED)
Ivona Makar (CRO)

==== Thirteenth and fourteenth place ====
11 April 2022
11:15

Wales	1–5	Uruguay
Wood 3'	Report	Vidal 7', 59'; Civetta 30'; Díaz 40'; Dieste 54'

Umpires:
Inès El Hajem (FRA)
Maria Locatelli (ARG)

=== Ninth to twelfth place classification ===
==== Cross-overs ====
9 April 2022
13:30

Zimbabwe	0–1	Austria
	Report	Bauer 55'

Umpires:
Alison Keogh (IRL)
Inès El Hajem (FRA)

9 April 2022
15:45

Ireland	2–1	Malaysia
Kelly 14'; Perdue 60'	Report	Zulkifli 47'

Umpires:
Ilaria Amorosini (ITA)
Céline Martin-Schmets (BEL)

==== Eleventh and twelfth place ====
11 April 2022
13:30

Zimbabwe	2–7	Malaysia
Elijah 2'; A. Terblanche 15'	Report	Mohd 10'; Insyirah 22'; Zulkifli 23', 48'; Azhar 39'; Dayang 41'; Mohd 53'

Umpires:
Victoria Pazos (PAR)
Rebecca Woodcock (ENG)

==== Ninth and tenth place ====
11 April 2022
15:45

Austria	0–4	Ireland
	Report	O'Brien 36'; Mulcahy 45'; Pratt 51'; Hamill 59'

Umpires:
Lisette Baljon (NED)
Sophie Bockelmann (GER)

== Medal round ==
=== Bracket ===
Quarter-finals
8 April
Netherlands	5
South Africa	0
8 April
India	3
South Korea	0
8 April
England	2
United States	1
8 April
Argentina	1
Germany	4

Semi-finals
10 April
Netherlands	3
India	0
10 April
England	0
Germany	8

Final
12 April
Netherlands	3
Germany	1
Third place
12 April
India	2 (0)
England (p.s.o.)	2 (3)

=== Quarter-finals ===
8 April 2022
09:00

India	3–0	South Korea
Mumtaz 11'; Lalrindiki 15'; Sangita 41'	Report

Umpires:
Lisette Baljon (NED)
Ilaria Amorosini (ITA)

8 April 2022
11:15

Netherlands	5–0	South Africa
Dicke 4', 15'; Omrani 44'; Fokke 45', 57'	Report

Umpires:
Inès El Hajem (FRA)
Céline Martin-Schmets (BEL)

8 April 2022
15:45

England	2–1	United States
Giglio 17'; Axford 44'	Report	Sessa 3'

Umpires:
Gema Calderón (ESP)
Kim Yoon-seon (KOR)

8 April 2022
18:00

Argentina	1–4	Germany
Cerundolo 25'	Report	Heinz 11'; Sippel 18'; Stoffelsma 23'; Kresken 27'

Umpires:
Ivona Makar (CRO)
Alison Keogh (IRL)

=== Fifth to eighth place classification ===
Cross-overs
10 April
South Africa	0
South Korea	1
10 April
United States	0
Argentina	2

Fifth place
12 April
South Korea	0
Argentina	10
Seventh place
12 April
South Africa	3
United States	2

==== Cross-overs ====
10 April 2022
09:00

United States	0–2	Argentina
	Report	Guggini 23'; Manuele 51'

Umpires:
Kim Yoon-seon (KOR)
Gema Calderón (ESP)

10 April 2022
11:15

South Africa	0–1	South Korea
	Report	Choi 25'

Umpires:
Victoria Pazos (PAR)
Ilaria Amorosini (ITA)

==== Seventh and eighth place ====
12 April 2022
09:00

South Africa	3–2	United States
Wood 7'; Du Toit 12'; Le Roux 33'	Report	Varney 38'; Tamer 51'

Umpires:
Maria Locatelli (ARG)
Kim Yoon-seon (KOR)

==== Fifth and sixth place ====
12 April 2022
11:15

South Korea	0–10	Argentina
	Report	Adorno 12'; Cairó 17'; Pagella 30'; Santamarina 38', 55'; Cerundolo 43'; Andrade 43'; Pacheco 51'; Bruggesser 52'; Manuele 55'

Umpires:
Gema Calderón (ESP)
Wanri Venter (RSA)

=== First to fourth place classification ===
==== Semi-finals ====
10 April 2022
13:30

Netherlands	3–0	India
Beetsma 12'; Fokke 53'; Dicke 54'	Report

Umpires:
Sophie Bockelmann (GER)
Rebecca Woodcock (ENG)

10 April 2022
15:45

England	0–8	Germany
	Report	Neumann 7', 35', 36'; Kurz 9'; Fleschütz 12'; Heinz 25'; Schwabe 57'; Stoffelsma 60'

Umpires:
Wanri Venter (RSA)
Céline Martin-Schmets (BEL)

==== Third and fourth place ====
12 April 2022
13:30

India	2–2	England
Mumtaz 21', 47'	Report	Giglio 18'; Swain 58'
Penalties
Sharmila (penalty shoot-out missed); Sangita (penalty shoot-out missed); Salima (penalty shoot-out missed)	0–3	(penalty shoot-out scored) Curtis; (penalty shoot-out scored) Swain; (penalty shoot-out scored) Axford

Umpires:
Lisette Baljon (NED)
Ilaria Amorosini (ITA)

==== Final ====
12 April 2022
15:45

Netherlands	3–1	Germany
Van der Veerdonk 7'; Beetsma 34', 44'	Report	Schwabe 32'

Umpires:
Alison Keogh (IRL)
Ivona Makar (CRO)

== Awards ==
The following awards were given at the conclusion of the tournament.

Top Goalscorer	Player of the Tournament	Goalkeeper of the Tournament
(Netherlands) Jip Dicke	(Germany) Stine Kurz	(Germany) Mali Wichmann

== Final standings ==
As per statistical convention in field hockey, matches decided in extra time are counted as wins and losses, while matches decided by penalty shoot-outs are counted as draws.

Pos	Grp	Team	Pld	W	D	L	GF	GA	GD	Pts	Final result
1	A	Netherlands	6	6	0	0	49	1	+48	18	Gold medal
2	D	Germany	6	4	0	2	32	6	+26	12	Silver medal
3	B	England	5	3	1	1	9	12	−3	10	Bronze medal
4	D	India	6	4	1	1	16	7	+9	13	
5	C	Argentina	6	5	0	1	27	4	+23	15	Losing quarter-finalists
6	C	South Korea	6	2	0	4	2	16	−14	6	Losing quarter-finalists
7	B	South Africa (H)	5	2	0	3	4	11	−7	6	Losing quarter-finalists
8	A	United States	6	2	0	4	12	16	−4	6	Losing quarter-finalists
9	B	Ireland	5	3	0	2	13	5	+8	9	Crossover winners
10	C	Austria	6	2	1	3	2	13	−11	7	Crossover winners
11	D	Malaysia	6	2	1	3	13	22	−9	7	Crossover winners
12	A	Zimbabwe	5	1	0	4	4	32	−28	3	Crossover winners
13	C	Uruguay	6	3	0	3	11	9	+2	9	Crossover losers
14	D	Wales	5	0	2	3	5	21	−16	2	Crossover losers
15	A	Canada	5	0	0	5	3	27	−24	0	Crossover losers

Source: FIH
(H) Hosts

== Goalscorers ==
There were 202 goals scored in 42 matches, for an average of 4.81 goals per match.

13 goals

- (Netherlands) Jip Dicke

11 goals

- (Netherlands) Luna Fokke

8 goals

- (India) Mumtaz Khan

6 goals

- (Malaysia) Nuramirah Zulkifli
- (Netherlands) Tessa Beetsma

5 goals

- (Argentina) Daiana Pacheco
- (Germany) Verena Neumann
- (Netherlands) Noor Omrani
- (United States) Hope Rose

4 goals

- (Argentina) Valentina Raposo
- (England) Camilla Giglio
- (Germany) Jette Fleschütz
- (Germany) Aina Kresken
- (Germany) Sophia Schwabe
- (Germany) Lilly Stoffelsma
- (Uruguay) Elisa Civetta
- (Uruguay) Manuela Vidal

3 goals

- (Argentina) María Adorno
- (Argentina) Sol Pagella
- (Germany) Pauline Heinz
- (Germany) Carlotta Sippel
- (India) Lalrindiki
- (Ireland) Caoimhe Perdue
- (Netherlands) Maria Steensma
- (Netherlands) Mette Winter

2 goals

- (Argentina) Catalina Andrade
- (Argentina) Brisa Bruggesser
- (Argentina) María Cerundolo
- (Argentina) Victoria Manuele
- (Argentina) Paula Santamarina
- (Canada) Jenna Berger
- (England) Lorna MacKenzie
- (Germany) Jule Bleuel
- (Germany) Stine Kurz
- (India) Sangita Kumari
- (India) Lalremsiami
- (Ireland) Christina Hamill
- (Ireland) Rachel Kelly
- (Ireland) Siofra O'Brien
- (Ireland) Yasmin Pratt
- (Malaysia) Siti Mohd
- (Netherlands) Josephine Murray
- (South Africa) Jean-Leigh du Toit
- (Zimbabwe) Alexi Terblanche

1 goal

- (Argentina) Sofía Cairó
- (Argentina) Juliana Guggini
- (Austria) Katharina Bauer
- (Austria) Helene Herzog
- (Canada) Stefanie Sajko
- (England) Madeleine Axford
- (England) Vicki McCabe
- (England) Claudia Swain
- (Germany) Sara Strauss
- (India) Deepika
- (Ireland) Lisa Mulcahy
- (Ireland) Emma Paul
- (Malaysia) Elizaberth Anak
- (Malaysia) Nur Azhar
- (Malaysia) Abang Dayang
- (Malaysia) Effarizal Insyirah
- (Malaysia) Khairunnisa Mohd
- (Netherlands) Rosa Fernig
- (Netherlands) Marleen Jochems
- (Netherlands) Kiki Rozemeijer
- (Netherlands) Noor de Baat
- (Netherlands) Teuntje de Wit
- (Netherlands) Danique van der Veerdonk
- (South Africa) Bianca Wood
- (South Africa) Mikkela le Roux
- (South Korea) Choi Nurim
- (South Korea) Jung Sung-hee
- (United States) Riley Donnelly
- (United States) Kathryn Peterson
- (United States) Caroline Ramsey
- (United States) Ashley Sessa
- (United States) Abigail Tamer
- (United States) Josie Varney
- (United States) Charlotte de Vries
- (Uruguay) Lucia Dieste
- (Uruguay) Agustina Díaz
- (Uruguay) Pilar Oliveros
- (Wales) Jessica Hill
- (Wales) Millie Holme
- (Wales) Isabelle Howell
- (Wales) Cerys Preston
- (Wales) Bethan Wood
- (Zimbabwe) Tinodiwanashe Elijah
- (Zimbabwe) Lilian Pope

Source: FIH

== See also ==
- 2021 Men's FIH Hockey Junior World Cup
- 2022 Women's FIH Hockey World Cup
