= Azul Rossetti =

Argentinian field hockey goalkeeper

María Azul Rossetti
Personal information
- Born: 9 August 1995 (age 30) Buenos Aires, Argentina
- Height: 166 cm (5 ft 5 in)
- Weight: 63 kg (139 lb)

Sport
- Sport: Field hockey
- Position: Goalkeeper
National team
Years	Team	Caps	Goals
2017-2018	Argentina	6	-
Medal record
South American Games
Gold medal – first place	2018 Cochabamba
Junior World Cup
Gold medal – first place	2016 Santiago	Team

María Azul Rossetti (born 9 August 1995) is an Argentinian field hockey goalkeeper.

== Hockey career ==
Rossetti was part of the Argentina Junior National Team at the 2016 Junior World Cup where the team won the gold medal, defeating the Netherlands in the final.

In 2018, Rossetti took part of the team that won the 2018 South American Games.
