= Rosa Fernig =

Dutch field hockey player

Personal information
- Born: 28 November 2000 (age 25) 's-Hertogenbosch, Netherlands

Sport
- Sport: Field hockey
- Position: Defence
Senior career
Years	Team	Caps	Goals
–	Den Bosch	-	-
National team
Years	Team	Caps	Goals
2019–2022	Netherlands U–21	12	(1)
2022–	Netherlands	19	(0)
Medal record
Women's field hockey
Representing Netherlands
World Cup
Silver medal – second place	2026 Wavre/Amstelveen
FIH Pro League
Gold medal – first place	Season Five	Team
FIH Junior World Cup
Gold medal – first place	2022 Potchefstroom	Team
EuroHockey U21 Championship
Silver medal – second place	2019 Valencia	Team

Rosa Fernig (born 28 November 2000) is a field hockey player from the Netherlands.

== Personal life ==
Rosa Fernig was born in 's-Hertogenbosch. She is a student at Tilburg University.

== Career ==
=== Under–21 ===
Rosa Fernig made her international debut at under–21 level. In 2019 she represented the Netherlands U–21 side at the EuroHockey U21 Championship in Valencia. She was part of the silver medal-winning Dutch team at the tournament.

In 2022, she made her final appearances for the junior national team at the delayed FIH Junior World Cup in Potchefstroom. She captained the side to a gold medal.

=== Oranje ===
Fernig received her first call-up to the senior national team in 2022. She made her senior international debut during a test match against Ireland in Bilthoven.

In 2024, Fernig was a reserve player for the Dutch squad at the XXXIII Olympic Games in Paris.
