= Millie Giglio =

German field hockey player (born 1997)

Personal information
- Full name: Camilla Giglio
- Born: 28 October 2000 (age 25) England

Sport
- Sport: Field hockey
- Position: Defender
- Club: HV Victoria
National team
| Years | Team | Caps | Goals |
| 2022 | England U–21 | 5 | (4) |
| 2024– | England | 3 | (1) |
Medal record
Women's field hockey
Representing England
FIH Junior World Cup
| Bronze medal – third place | 2022 Potchefstroom | Team |

Camilla 'Millie' Giglio (born 28 October 2000) is a field hockey player from England.

== Career ==
=== Under–21 ===
In 2021, Giglio was named in the England U–21 for the FIH Junior World Cup in Potchefstroom. The competition was later postponed, resulting in squad changes and Giglio's appointment as team captain. At the delayed event, she led the team to England's first ever bronze medal.

=== Senior national squad ===
Giglio received her maiden call up to the senior national squad in 2022. She travelled with the team to the United States for the 2021–22 FIH Pro League, however she did not appear in any matches.

Following the 2024 Summer Olympics, a restructured England squad was announced, including Giglio. She made her senior international debut in December during a match against China during the Hangzhou leg of season six of the FIH Pro League. During the tour, she also scored her first international goal.

==== International goals ====
| Goal | Date | Location | Opponent | Score | Result | Competition | Ref. |
|---|---|---|---|---|---|---|---|
| 1 | 5 December 2024 | Gongshu Canal Sports Park Stadium, Hangzhou, China | Belgium | 2–0 | 2–8 | 2024–25 FIH Pro League | |
