= 2018 Pan American Youth Olympic Games Qualifier (boys' field hockey) =

2018 Youth Pan American Championship

Tournament details
- Host country: Mexico
- City: Guadalajara
- Dates: 12 –17 March 2018
- Teams: 8

Final positions
- Champions: Argentina
- Runner-up: Mexico
- Third place: Canada

Tournament statistics
- Matches played: 22
- Goals scored: 142 (6.45 per match)
- Top scorer(s): (Argentina) Facundo Sarto (Brazil) Vinicius Vaz (Mexico) Luis Villegas (9 goals)

The 2018 Pan American Youth Olympic Games Qualifier for boys' field hockey, also known as 2018 Youth Pan American Championship, was an international field hockey competition which served as a qualification for the 2018 Summer Youth Olympics. The event was held from 12 – 17 March 2018 in Guadalajara, Mexico.

The winner and runner-up of this tournament qualified for the 2018 Summer Youth Olympics. Argentina and Mexico became the winner and runner-up. However, since Argentina had already qualified at the host nation, the third placed team (Canada) has also qualified.

== Participating nations ==
Alongside the host nation, 7 teams competed in the tournament.

- Argentina
- Brazil
- Canada
- Dominican Republic
- Guatemala
- Jamaica
- Mexico
- Paraguay

== Results ==
All times are local (UTC-6). Each game lasts for 20 minutes

=== First round ===
==== Pool A ====
Pos	Team	Pld	W	D	L	GF	GA	GD	Pts
1	Argentina	3	2	1	0	23	3	+20	7
2	Mexico	3	2	1	0	16	5	+11	7
3	Paraguay	3	1	0	2	6	8	−2	3
4	Guatemala	3	0	0	3	1	30	−29	0

Source: FIH
Rules for classification: 1) points; 2) goal difference; 3) goals scored; 4) head-to-head result.

12 March 2018
10:45

Argentina	14–0	Guatemala
Zago 1'; Sarto 1', 15', 19'; Ibarra 3', 8', 16'; Marcucci 5', 5', 14', 17'; Fernández 9'; Inaudi 13', 18'	Report

Umpires:
Reinier Diaz Garcia (CUB)
Airey Kimani (JAM)

12 March 2018
11:30

Mexico	2–1	Paraguay
Pérez 16'; Hernández 18'	Report	Pereira 15'

Umpires:
Donovan Simmons (BER)
Austin Paquette (CAN)

12 March 2018
16:15

Guatemala	0–5	Paraguay
	Report	Vera 3', 10'; Chamorro 9'; Monges 12'; Ruetalo 16'

Umpires:
Oliver Höck (BRA)
Airey Kimani (JAM)

12 March 2018
17:00

Mexico	3–3	Argentina
Hernández 9'; Villegas 14'; Palma 18'	Report	Pérez 3', 13'; Ibarra 17'

Umpires:
Donovan Simmons (BER)
Reinier Diaz Garcia (CUB)

13 March 2018
11:15

Argentina	6–0	Paraguay
Micaz 4'; Inaudi 14', 15', 16'; Fernández 15'; Zago 20'	Report

Umpires:
Austin Paquette (CAN)
Oliver Höck (BRA)

13 March 2018
13:00

Guatemala	1–11	Mexico
Villatoro 12'	Report	Estrada 2', 10', 18'; Sosa 5', 6'; Villegas 6', 13', 14', 15'; Palma 19'; Hernández 20'

Umpires:
Andres Ledesma (ARG)
Airey Kimani (JAM)

==== Pool B ====
Pos	Team	Pld	W	D	L	GF	GA	GD	Pts
1	Canada	3	3	0	0	12	1	+11	9
2	Brazil	3	2	0	1	8	5	+3	6
3	Jamaica	3	1	0	2	7	10	−3	3
4	Dominican Republic	3	0	0	3	4	15	−11	0

Source: FIH
Rules for classification: 1) points; 2) goal difference; 3) goals scored; 4) head-to-head result.

12 March 2018
12:15

Canada	6–1	Dominican Republic
Butt 1', 9'; Childs 5'; Guraliuk 12'; Hothi 19'; Farion 20'	Report	de Mora 15'

Umpires:
Hugo Romero Chamorro (PRY)
Blake Mhor (USA)

12 March 2018
13:00

Brazil	4–2	Jamaica
Vaz 5', 12'; Martins 9'; Oliveira 17'	Report	Smalling 16'; Harding 17'

Umpires:
Andres Ledesma (ARG)
Jonathan Altamirano (MEX)

12 March 2018
17:45

Dominican Republic	3–5	Jamaica
Dominguez 1'; Mora 8'; Quezada 13'	Report	Smalling 4', 14'; Gordon 5'; Stephenson 10'; Harding 19'

Umpires:
Luis Cardona (GUA)
Oliver Höck (BRA)

12 March 2018
18:30

Brazil	0–3	Canada
	Report	Dhillion 12'; Singh 16'; Guraliuk 20'

Umpires:
Hugo Romero Chamorro (PRY)
Jonathan Altamirano (MEX)

13 March 2018
13:45

Canada	3–0	Jamaica
Farion 14'; Singh 17'; Childs 18'	Report

Umpires:
Blake Mohr (USA)
Luis Cardona (GUA)

13 March 2018
14:30

Dominican Republic	0–4	Brazil
	Report	Oliveira 6'; Lemos 8'; Vaz 12'; Monsores 20'

Umpires:
Reinier Diaz Garcia (CUB)
Andres Ledesma (ARG)

=== Second round ===
Fifth place
Brazil	7
Jamaica	2
Seventh place
Dominican Republic	3
Guatemala	2

Consolation semifinals
Dominican Republic	0
Brazil	8
Jamaica	4
Guatemala	2

Quarterfinals
Argentina	12
Dominican Republic	0
Brazil	2 (2)
Paraguay (p.s.o)	2 (3)
Mexico	7
Jamaica	1
Canada	7
Guatemala	0

Semifinals
Argentina	5
Paraguay	0
Mexico	3
Canada	0

Final
Argentina	3
Mexico	2
Third place
Paraguay	0
Canada	6

==== Quarterfinals ====
14 March 2018
09:00

Argentina	12–0	Dominican Republic
Zago 1'; Inaudi 2', 8'; Sarto 3', 7', 18'; Fernández 9', 17'; Marcucci 11'; Ibarra 13', 19'; Micaz 15'	Report

Umpires:
Donovan Simmons (BER)
Hugo Romero Chamorro (PRY)

14 March 2018
10:00

Brazil	2–2	Paraguay
Martins 5'; Vaz 19'	Report	Chamorro 6', 6'
Penalties
(penalty shoot-out scored) Monsores; (penalty shoot-out missed) Costa; (penalty shoot-out scored) Froelich; (penalty shoot-out missed) Froelich	2–3	(penalty shoot-out scored) Monges; (penalty shoot-out scored) Chamorro; (penalty shoot-out missed) Ruetalo; (penalty shoot-out scored) Ruetalo

Umpires:
Andres Ledesma (ARG)
Austin Paquette (CAN)

14 March 2018
11:00

Mexico	7–1	Jamaica
Villegas 9', 9', 17'; Sosa 10'; Gomez 12'; Hernández 13'; Estrada 16'	Report	Gordon 12'

Umpires:
Reinier Diaz Garcia (CUB)
Blake Mohr (USA)

14 March 2018
13:00

Canada	7–0	Guatemala
Childs 4', 18'; Dhillion 9', 14', 17'; Butt 11', 15'	Report

Umpires:
Oliver Höck (BRA)
Jonathan Altamirano (MEX)

==== Fifth to eighth place classification ====
===== Crossover =====
16 March 2018
10:00

Dominican Republic	0–8	Brazil
	Report	Froelich 1', 13'; Martins 4'; Lemos 10'; Oliveira 12', 16'; Vaz 19', 20'

Umpires:
Luis Cardona (GUA)
Airey Kimani (JAM)

16 March 2018
11:00

Jamaica	4–2	Guatemala
Gordon 5', 6'; Stephenson 10', 19'	Report	Borrayo 8'; Villatorro 17'

Umpires:
Oliver Höck (BRA)
Hugo Romero Chamorro (PRY)

===== Seventh and eighth place =====
17 March 2018
10:00

Dominican Republic	3–2	Guatemala
Quezada 7'; Medina 11', 20'	Report	Pineda 10+'; Carderón 16'

Umpires:
Oliver Höck (BRA)
Hugo Romero Chamorro (PRY)

===== Fifth and sixth place =====
17 March 2018
13:00

Brazil	7–2	Jamaica
Lemos 3', 15'; Vaz 3', 13', 20'; Martins 4', 17'	Report	Reid 10'; Smalling 16'

Umpires:
Austin Paquette (CAN)
Blake Mohr (USA)

==== First to fourth place classification ====
===== Semi-finals =====
16 March 2018
13:00

Argentina	5–0	Paraguay
Sarto 8', 15', 20'; Ibarra 10'; Fernández 17'	Report

Umpires:
Donovan Simmons (BER)
Jonathan Altamirano (MEX)

16 March 2018
14:00

Mexico	3–0	Canada
Gomez 9'; Villegas 15'; Hernández 16'	Report

Umpires:
Reinier Diaz Garcia (CUB)
Andres Ledesma (ARG)

===== Third and fourth place =====
17 March 2018
15:00

Paraguay	0–6	Canada
	Report	Guraliuk 5', 17'; Dhillion 7'; Farion 14'; Childs 15'; Butt 19'

Umpires:
Andres Ledesma (ARG)
Jonathan Altamirano (MEX)

===== Final =====
17 March 2018
17:00

Argentina	3–2	Mexico
Marcucci 5'; Micaz 8'; Zago 20'	Report	Gomez 15'; Hernández 15'

Umpires:
Donovan Simmons (BER)
Reinier Diaz Garcia (CUB)

== Final standings ==
Rank	Team
Gold medal	Argentina
Silver medal	Mexico
Bronze medal	Canada
4	Paraguay
5	Brazil
6	Jamaica
7	Dominican Republic
8	Guatemala

== Goalscorers ==
9 goals

- (Argentina) Facundo Sarto
- (Brazil) Vinicius Vaz
- (Mexico) Luis Villegas

7 goals

- (Argentina) Ignacio Ibarra
- (Argentina) Pedro Inaudi

6 goals

- (Argentina) Tadeo Marcucci
- (Mexico) Erik Hernández

5 goals

- (Argentina) Martin Fernández
- (Brazil) Gabriel Martins
- (Canada) Shazab Butt
- (Canada) Rowan Childs
- (Canada) Amraaz Dhillion

4 goals

- (Argentina) Lisandro Zago
- (Brazil) Lucas Lemos
- (Brazil) Matheus Oliveira
- (Canada) Isaac Farion
- (Canada) Brendan Guraliuk
- (Jamaica) Shemar Gordon
- (Jamaica) Deandre Smalling
- (Mexico) Jorge Estrada

3 goals

- (Jamaica) Nickoy Stephenson
- (Mexico) Jorge Gomez
- (Mexico) Juan Sosa
- (Paraguay) Santiago Chamorro

2 goals

- (Argentina) Santiago Micaz
- (Argentina) Brayan Pérez
- (Brazil) Bryan Froelich
- (Canada) Ganga Singh
- (Dominican Republic) Alexander Medina
- (Dominican Republic) Daneudi de Mora
- (Dominican Republic) Anyelo Quezada
- (Guatemala) Carlos Villatoro
- (Jamaica) Gifford Harding
- (Mexico) Alexander Palma
- (Paraguay) Elias Vera

1 goal

- (Brazil) Paulo Monsores
- (Canada) Arjun Hothi
- (Dominican Republic) Ramon Dominguez
- (Guatemala) Kevin Borrayo
- (Guatemala) Abel Calderón
- (Guatemala) Jason Pineda
- (Jamaica) Christopher Reid
- (Mexico) Brayan Pérez
- (Paraguay) Aram Monges
- (Paraguay) Alexis Pereira
- (Paraguay) Federico Ruetalo

== See also ==
- 2018 Pan American Youth Olympic Games Qualifier (girls' field hockey)
