= 2025 Men's EuroHockey Club Trophy I =

Tournament details
- Host country: Northern Ireland
- City: Lisburn
- Dates: 18–21 April
- Teams: 7 (from 7 associations)
- Venue: Lisnagarvey Hockey Club

Final positions
- Champions: (France) CAM 92 (3rd title)
- Runner-up: (Ireland) Lisnagarvey
- Third place: (Wales) Cardiff & Met

Tournament statistics
- Matches played: 12
- Goals scored: 67 (5.58 per match)
- Top scorer: (Wales) Ioan Wall (10 goals)
- Best player: (Ireland) Matthew Nelson
- Best goalkeeper: (Ukraine) Bohdan Tovstolytkin

The 2025 Men's EuroHockey Club Trophy I will be the 48th edition of Europe's secondary men's club field hockey tournament organised by the European Hockey Federation, and the fourth edition since it was renamed from the Men's EuroHockey Club Trophy to the Men's EuroHockey Club Trophy I. The tournament will be hosted by Lisnagarvey Hockey Club in Lisburn, Northern Ireland from 18 to 21 April 2025.

The hosts Lisnagarvey are the defending champions, having won their second title in the previous edition.

== Teams ==
Portugal and Switzerland were relegated and replaced by Turkey and Italy who were promoted from the 2024 EuroHockey Club Trophy II. Gaziantep withdrew before the tournament so seven teams will participate in the tournament.

- (France) CAM 92
- (Wales) Cardiff & Met
- ~~(Turkey) Gaziantep~~
- (Scotland) Grange
- (Ireland) Lisnagarvey
- (Ukraine) OKS Vinnitsa
- (Czech Republic) Slavia Prague
- (Italy) Tevere

== Preliminary round ==
=== Pool A ===
Pos	Team	Pld	W	D	L	GF	GA	GD	Pts	Qualification
1	(France) CAM 92	2	2	0	0	11	0	+11	10	Final
2	(Scotland) Grange	2	1	0	1	1	7	−6	6	Third place match
3	(Ukraine) OKS Vinnitsa	2	0	0	2	0	5	−5	2	Fifth place match

Source: EHF
Rules for classification: 1) points; 2) matches won; 3) goal difference; 4) goals for; 5) head-to-head result; 6) field goals for.

18 April 2025
12:45

CAM 92 (France)	4–0	(Ukraine) OKS Vinnitsa
Gaillard 3'; Bézier-Mercier 12'; Poupée 38'; Clément 46'	Report

Umpires:
Ana Ortega (ESP)
Aleš Větrovský (CZE)

19 April 2025
12:15

Grange (Scotland)	0–7	(France) CAM 92
	Report	Gaillard 32', 55'; Loussif 38'; Poupée 47'; Sellier 50'; Bézier-Mercier 56'; Clément 59'

Umpires:
Sarah Craig (IRL)
Aleš Větrovský (CZE)

20 April 2025
12:15

OKS Vinnitsa (Ukraine)	0–1	(Scotland) Grange
	Report	Green 34'

Umpires:
Aleš Větrovský (CZE)
Lucien van der Borght (BEL)

=== Pool B ===
Pos	Team	Pld	W	D	L	GF	GA	GD	Pts	Qualification or relegation
1	(Ireland) Lisnagarvey (H)	3	3	0	0	17	5	+12	15	Final
2	(Wales) Cardiff & Met	3	2	0	1	17	7	+10	11	Third place match
3	(Czech Republic) Slavia Prague	3	0	1	2	4	15	−11	4	Fifth place match
4	(Italy) Tevere	3	0	1	2	1	12	−11	4	Relegation to Trophy II

Source: EHF
Rules for classification: 1) points; 2) matches won; 3) goal difference; 4) goals for; 5) head-to-head result; 6) field goals for.
(H) Hosts

18 April 2025
15:00

Cardiff & Met (Wales)	6–0	(Italy) Tevere
Pritchard 14', 23'; Wall 43', 46', 55'; Tyson 52'	Report

Umpires:
Paula Slawinska (POL)
Amar Chudasama (ENG)

18 April 2025
17:15

Lisnagarvey (Ireland)	7–1	(Czech Republic) Slavia Prague
Kidd 1'; Williamson 6', 10'; Lynch 33'; M. Nelson 36'; Edgar 47'; Getty 60'	Report	Vacek 53'

Umpires:
Alia Korth (GER)
Berry van Bentum (NED)

19 April 2025
14:30

Slavia Prague (Czech Republic)	1–1	(Italy) Tevere
Dubina 53'	Report	Palombi 59'

Umpires:
Amar Chudasama (ENG)
Lucien van der Borght (BEL)

19 April 2025
16:45

Cardiff & Met (Wales)	4–5	(Ireland) Lisnagarvey
Wall 10', 21'; Pritchard 34'; Fleck 38'	Report	Kidd 5'; Lynch 25'; M. Nelson 28', 45'; McNellis 55'

Umpires:
Ana Ortega (ESP)
Berry van Bentum (NED)

20 April 2025
14:30

Slavia Prague (Czech Republic)	2–7	(Wales) Cardiff & Met
Svatoň 3'; Vacek 55'	Report	Wall 9', 11', 57'; Rawlings 28'; Pritchard 50', 52'; Fleck 60'

Umpires:
Ana Ortega (ESP)
Sarah Craig (IRL)

20 April 2025
16:45

Lisnagarvey (Ireland)	5–0	(Italy) Tevere
Aughey 17'; McNellis 20', 33'; D. Nelson 30'; Archbold 31'	Report

Umpires:
Alia Korth (GER)
Paula Slawinska (POL)

== Classification round ==
=== Fifth and sixth place ===
21 April 2025
10:30

OKS Vinnitsa (Ukraine)	2–2	(Czech Republic) Slavia Prague
Yakovenko 2'; Kostechko 3'	Report	Toms 42', 43'
Penalties
Moroz (penalty shoot-out scored); Kostechko (penalty shoot-out missed); Yakovenko (penalty shoot-out scored); Yasinskyi (penalty shoot-out missed); Popov (penalty shoot-out missed)	2–3	(penalty shoot-out missed) Vacek; (penalty shoot-out scored) Babický; (penalty shoot-out missed) Brzák; (penalty shoot-out scored) Toms; (penalty shoot-out scored) Šmíd

Umpires:
Alia Korth (GER)
Sarah Craig (IRL)

=== Third and fourth place ===
21 April 2025
12:45

Grange (Scotland)	0–6	(Wales) Cardiff & Met
	Report	Tyson 18'; Wall 28', 30'; Riley 49'; George 53'; Rawlings 54'

Umpires:
Ana Ortega (ESP)
Berry van Bentum (NED)

=== Final ===
21 April 2025
15:00

CAM 92 (France)	3–3	(Ireland) Lisnagarvey
Gaillard 17'; Bézier-Mercier 21'; Lorrazuri 41'	Report	Kidd 18'; Edgar 51'; Lynch 55'
Penalties
Montecot (penalty shoot-out scored); Igau (penalty shoot-out scored); Clément (penalty shoot-out scored); Sellier (penalty shoot-out scored)	4–2	(penalty shoot-out scored) M. Nelson; (penalty shoot-out scored) Kidd; (penalty shoot-out missed) Lynch; (penalty shoot-out missed) D. Nelseon

Umpires:
Amar Chudasama (ENG)
Lucien van der Borght (BEL)

== Final standings ==
Pos	Team	Relegation
1	(France) CAM 92	
2	(Ireland) Lisnagarvey (H)	
3	(Wales) Cardiff & Met	
4	(Scotland) Grange	
5	(Czech Republic) Slavia Prague	
6	(Ukraine) OKS Vinnitsa	
7	(Italy) Tevere (R)	EuroHockey Club Trophy II

Source: EHF
(H) Host; (R) Relegated

== See also ==
- 2024–25 Men's Euro Hockey League
- 2025 Women's EuroHockey Club Trophy I
