= Field hockey at the 2018 Summer Youth Olympics =

Field hockey at the III Summer Youth Olympic Games
- Venue: Parque Polideportivo Roca
- Dates: 7–14 October
- No. of events: 2 (1 boys, 1 girls)

Field Hockey at the 2018 Summer Youth Olympics was held from 7 to 14 October. The events took place at the Parque Polideportivo Roca in Buenos Aires, Argentina. For the second Youth Olympics in a row, the format for this event was Hockey 5s, a 5-a-side tournament that is played on a smaller field size.

== Qualification ==
Initially, 10 teams per tournament were scheduled to take part; however, on 6 July 2017 the International Hockey Federation announced the tournaments will be expanded to 12 teams. As hosts, Argentina qualified in both tournaments. Five continental tournaments were scheduled with two nations qualifying to the Youth Olympics. The 12th and final team was determined through a draw where the third best team qualified from the continent qualified. Should a nation decline it would go to the third best team in another continent. The results of the random draw (and priority) for the boys' tournament was Oceania > Asia > Europe > Africa and Pan American while the results for the girls' tournament was Africa > Asia > Europe > Oceania > Pan America.

To be eligible to participate at the Youth Olympics athletes must have been born between 1 January 2000 and 31 December 2003. Also nations (excluding Argentina) may only qualify in one team sport (Beach Handball, Futsal, Hockey5s or Rugby Sevens) per gender.

=== Boys ===
Event	Location	Date	Total Places	Qualified
Host Nation	–	–	1	Argentina
EuroHockey5s Championships	(Poland) Walcz	6–9 July 2017	2	Poland; Austria^{A}
Youth Pan American Championship	(Mexico) Guadalajara	10–17 March 2018	2	Mexico; Canada
Asian Youth Olympic Games Qualifier	(Thailand) Bangkok	25–29 April 2018	3	India; Malaysia; Bangladesh^{B}
Oceania Youth Olympic Games Qualifier	(Papua New Guinea) Port Moresby	25–28 April 2018	2	Australia; Vanuatu
African Youth Games	(Algeria) Algiers	19–26 July 2018	2	Zambia; Kenya^{A}
TOTAL			12	

^AFrance and South Africa qualified in boys' field hockey and rugby sevens, opting to send their respective latter. Austria and Kenya respectively were listed by the IHF as participating in their place.
^BSolomon Islands decided to compete in futsal and thus the quota was reallocated to the third best placed team from Asia, Bangladesh.

=== Girls ===
Event	Location	Date	Total Places	Qualified
Host Nation	–	–	1	Argentina
EuroHockey5s Championships	(France) Wattignies	12–15 July 2017	2	Austria; Poland
Youth Pan American Championship	(Mexico) Guadalajara	10–17 March 2018	2	Uruguay; Mexico
Asian Youth Olympic Games Qualifier	(Thailand) Bangkok	25–29 April 2018	2	China; India
Oceania Youth Olympic Games Qualifier	(Papua New Guinea) Port Moresby	25–28 April 2018	2	Australia; Vanuatu
African Youth Games	(Algeria) Algiers	19–26 July 2018	3	South Africa; Namibia; Zimbabwe
TOTAL			12	

== Schedule ==
The schedule was released by the FIH and Buenos Aires 2018 Youth Olympic Games Organising Committee. Each day during the group stage will contain six boys' matches and six girls' matches.

All times are ART (UTC-3)

Event date	Event day	Starting time	Event details
October 7	Sunday	09:30	Boys' Group Stage; Girls' Group Stage
October 8	Monday	09:30	Boys' Group Stage; Girls' Group Stage
October 9	Tuesday	09:30	Boys' Group Stage; Girls' Group Stage
October 10	Wednesday	09:30	Boys' Group Stage; Girls' Group Stage
October 11	Thursday	09:30	Boys' Group Stage; Girls' Group Stage
October 12	Friday	08:00	Boys' 9–10 Place Match; Boys' Quarterfinals; Boys' 11–12 Place Match; Girls' Quarterfinals
October 13	Saturday	09:00	Girls' 11–12 Place Match; Boys' 5–8 Place Match; Boys' Semifinals; Girls' Semifinals
October 14	Sunday	08:30	Boys' 7–8 Place Match; Girls' 7–8 Place Match; Boys' 5–6 Place Match; Girls' 5–6 Place Match; Boys' 3–4 Place Match; Girls' 3–4 Place Match; Boys' Final; Girls' Final

== Medal summary ==
=== Medal table ===
* Host nation (Argentina)

Rank	Nation	Gold	Silver	Bronze	Total
1	Argentina*	1	0	1	2
2	Malaysia	1	0	0	1
3	India	0	2	0	2
4	China	0	0	1	1
Totals (4 entries)		2	2	2	6

=== Events ===
Event	Gold	Silver	Bronze
Boys'	Malaysia; Hamiz Ahir; Akhimullah Anuar; Amirul Azahar; Arif Ishak; Kamarulzaman Kamaruddin; Syarman Mat; Muhibddin Moharam; Firadus Rosdi; Shahrul Saupi	India; Shivam Anand; Prashant Chauhan; Sudeep Chirmako; Rabichandra Singh Moirangthem; Pawan; Vivek Prasad; Rahul Kumar Rajbhar; Sanjay; Maninder Singh	Argentina; Nehuen Hernando; Facundo Zarate; Ignacio Ibarra; Gaspar Garrone; Tadeo Marcucci; Santiago Micaz; Facundo Sarto; Lisandro Zago; Agustin Cabaña
Girls'	Argentina; Brisa Bruggesser; María Cerundolo; Celina Di Santo; Azul Iritxity; Victoria Miranda; Gianella Palet; Lourdes Pérez Iturraspe; Sofía Ramallo; Josefina Rübenacker	India; Salima Tete; Reet; Baljeet Kaur; Ishika Chaudhary; Mumtaz Khan; Khushboo; Chetna; Bichu Kharibam; Lalremsiami Hmarzote	China; Xinyi Zhu; Heyang Zhang; Ruirui Cao; Zou Meirong; Ning Ma; Yu Anhui; Fan Yunxia; Wenqian Cai; Yangyan Gu
