= Aina Kresken =

German field hockey player (born 2000)

Personal information
- Full name: Aina Lilly Kresken
- Born: 29 June 2000 (age 26) Koblenz, Germany

Sport
- Sport: Field hockey
- Position: Forward
- Club: Mannheimer HC
National team
Years	Team	Caps	Goals
2019–2022	Germany U–21	7	(4)
2022–	Germany	6	(1)
Medal record
Women's field hockey
Representing Germany
FIH Junior World Cup
Silver medal – second place	2022 Potchefstroom	Team

Aina Lilly Kresken (born 29 June 2000) is a field hockey player from Germany.

== Personal life ==
Aina Kresken was born and raised in Koblenz, Germany.

She is currently studying psychology at the University of Mannheim.

== Career ==
=== Domestic leagues ===
In the German Bundesliga and the Euro Hockey Leagues, Kresken represents Mannheimer HC.

=== Under–21 ===
Kresken made her debut for the German U–21 team in 2019. She was a member of the squad during a test–series against the United States, held in Viersen and Mönchengladbach.

In 2021, Kresken was named in the national junior squad for the FIH Junior World Cup in Potchefstroom. Due to the COVID-19 pandemic, the competition was later postponed resulting in squad changes, however she retained her place in the side. At the delayed event in 2022, she helped the German team to a silver medal.

=== Die Danas ===
Prior to her departure for the FIH Junior World Cup in 2022, Kresken received her first call–up to the senior national squad. She made her debut for Die Danas during a match against Spain in the 2021–22 FIH Pro League, held in Düsseldorf.

She did not receive another call–up to the national squad until 2024. She was included in the team to travel to Santiago del Estero and Bhubaneswar for Germany's away legs of the 2024–25 FIH Pro League.

== International goals ==
The following is a list of goals scored by Kresken at international level.

Goal	Date	Location	Opponent	Score	Result	Competition	Ref.
1	16 February 2025	Kalinga Stadium, Bhubaneswar, India	Spain	1–1	1–2	2024–25 FIH Pro League	
