= Caitlin Sherin =

Irish field hockey player

Personal information
- Full name: Caitlin Majella Sherin
- Born: 1 June 2000 (age 26) Dublin, Ireland

Sport
- Sport: Field hockey
- Position: Defence
Senior career
Years	Team	Caps	Goals
–2025	Loreto	-	-
2025–	Junior	-	-
National team
Years	Team	Caps	Goals
2017–2018	Ireland U–18	5	(0)
2019–2022	Ireland U–21	9	(0)
2023–	Ireland	10	(0)
Medal record
Women's field hockey
Representing Ireland

Caitlin Majella Sherin (born 1 June 2000) is a field hockey player from Ireland.

== Career ==
=== Domestic league ===
Sherin is currently competing in the Liga Iberdrola, the premier women's domestic competition hosted by the Royal Spanish Hockey Federation. In the league, she is a member of the Junior first team.

She also previously competed in the EY Hockey League for Loreto.

=== Under–18 ===
In 2018, Sherin captained the Ireland national youth squad at the 2018 EuroHockey U–18 Championship in Santander.

=== Under–21 ===
From 2019 until 2022, Sherin was a member of the Ireland U–21 squad. In 2019, she represented the side at the 2019 EuroHockey U–21 Championship in Valencia. Her final appearance came in 2022, when she captained the side at the FIH Junior World Cup in Potchefstroom.

=== Green Army ===
She made her international debut for the Green Army in 2023, earning her first senior cap during a test match against Chile in Dublin. She followed this up with an appearance at her first major tournament, representing the national squad at the EuroHockey Championship in Mönchengladbach.

Sherin returned to the national squad in 2025, travelling to the United States for a test series. She has also been named in the squad for the seventh season of the FIH Pro League.
