= Isabelle Howell =

Welsh field hockey player

Izzie Howell
Personal information
- Full name: Isabelle Howell
- Born: 22 February 2000 (age 26) Wales
- Height: 160 cm (5 ft 3 in)
- Weight: 64 kg (141 lb)

Sport
- Sport: Field hockey
- Position: Midfield
- Club: Zehlendorfer Wespen
National team
Years	Team	Caps	Goals
2018–	Wales	35	(4)
2019–2022	Wales U–21	4	(1)

Isabelle "Izzie" Howell (born 22 February 2000) is a Welsh field hockey player.

== Career ==
=== Club level ===
In club competition, Howell plays for Zehlendorfer Wespen in the German Bundesliga.

=== National teams ===
==== Under–21 ====
Isabelle Howell made her debut for the Welsh U–21 team in 2019. She was a co-captain of the team at the EuroHockey Junior Championship II in Alanya.

In 2022 she was named as captain of the junior side for the FIH Junior World Cup in Potchefstroom.

==== Senior national team ====
Howell made her debut for the senior national team in 2018. She was a member of the team at the XXI Commonwealth Games in the Gold Coast.

She has since gone on to represent the team in many international competitions. In 2019 she appeared at the FIH Series Finals in Valencia, as well as the EuroHockey Championship II in Glasgow.

In 2021 she appeared at her second EuroHockey Championship II in Prague.
