= Josephine Murray =

New Zealand field hockey player (born 2000)

Personal information
- Full name: Josephine Joanna Francisca Murray
- Born: 5 September 2000 (age 26) Christchurch, New Zealand

Sport
- Sport: Field hockey
- Position: Midfield
Senior career
Years	Team	Caps	Goals
2016–	Pinoké	-	-
National team
Years	Team	Caps	Goals
2019–2022	Netherlands U–21	5	(2)
2025–	New Zealand	17	(1)
Medal record
Women's field hockey
Representing Netherlands
FIH Junior World Cup
Gold medal – first place	2022 Potchefstroom
EuroHockey Youth Championship
Gold medal – first place	2018 Santander
Representing New Zealand
Oceania Cup
Gold medal – first place	2025 Darwin
FIH Nations Cup
Silver medal – second place	2025–26 Auckland

Josephine Joanna Francisca Murray (born 5 September 2000) is an international field hockey player, who has represented national teams of both the Netherlands and New Zealand.

== Personal life ==
Josephine Murray was born and raised in Christchurch, New Zealand. At the age of four, she moved to Amsterdam, Netherlands.

== Career ==
=== Domestic league ===
Murray currently competes in the Dutch Hoofdklasse, where she is a member of the ladies' first team at Pinoké.

=== Under–21 ===
From 2019 until 2022, Murray was a member of the Netherlands U–21 team. During this time, she was named as a reserve for the 2019 EuroHockey Junior Championship in Valencia, and as a member of the squad at the 2022 FIH Junior World Cup in Potchefstroom. At the FIH Junior World Cup, she won a gold medal.

=== Black Sticks ===
Thanks to her New Zealand heritage, Murray had the ability to switch playing allegiance back to her country of birth, which she did in 2025. She was named in the squad for the 2025 Oceania Cup in Darwin, and made her senior international debut for the Black Sticks during the tournament. In fact, in her debut for New Zealand, it was Murray who set up captain Olivia Shannon for the only goal in their victory over Australia.
