= Siofra O'Brien =

Irish field hockey player (born 2000)

Personal information
- Full name: Siofra Mary O'Brien
- Born: 22 February 2000 (age 26) Dublin, Ireland

Sport
- Sport: Field hockey
- Position: Forward
- Club: Loreto
National team
| Years | Team | Caps | Goals |
| 2019–2022 | Ireland U–21 | 13 | (3) |
| 2022– | Ireland | 12 | (0) |
Medal record
Women's field hockey
Representing Ireland
FIH Nations Cup
| Silver medal – second place | 2023–24 Terrassa |

Siofra Mary O'Brien (born 22 February 2000) is an Irish field hockey player.

== Personal life ==
Siofra O'Brien was born and raised in Dublin, Ireland.

== Career ==
=== National league ===
In the Irish Hockey League, O'Brien plays for Loreto.

=== Under–21 ===
O'Brien made her international debut at under–21 level. She was a member of the Irish U–21 side during a Four–Nations Tournament in Dublin. She also appeared at the EuroHockey Junior Championship in Valencia, where the team finished in seventh place.

She was also a member of the junior squad at the 2022 FIH Junior World Cup in Potchefstroom.

=== Senior squad ===
In 2022, O'Brien made her senior international debut at the FIH World Cup held in Amsterdam and Terrassa. She was initially listed as a reserve player, however was called into action following an injury to Caoimhe Perdue. She made her official debut in a ranking match against China. Later that year she appeared at the FIH Nations Cup in Valencia.

Since her debut, O'Brien has been a constant inclusion in the national squad. She has most recently been called into the squad for the 2023–24 FIH Nations Cup in Terrassa.
