= Christina Hamill =

Irish field hockey player

Personal information
- Full name: Christina Hamill
- Born: 31 January 2000 (age 26) Ireland

Sport
- Sport: Field hockey
- Position: Midfield
National team
Years	Team	Caps	Goals
2019–2022	Ireland U–21	14	(2)
2022–	Ireland	0	(0)
Medal record
Women's field hockey
Representing Ireland
FIH Nations Cup
Silver medal – second place	2023–24 Terrassa

Christina Hamill (born 31 January 2000) is a field hockey player from Ireland.

== Career ==
=== Under–21 ===
Christina Hamill made her debut for the Ireland U–21 team in 2019 during a four–nations tournament in Dublin. She went on to represent the team again at the EuroHockey Junior Championship in Valencia later that year.

In 2022, she was a member of the team at the FIH Junior World Cup in Potchefstroom.

=== National team ===
Following her successful career in the junior squad, Hamill was named in the national team for the 2022 FIH World Cup in Terrassa and Amsterdam.
