= Jule Bleuel =

German field hockey player

Personal information
- Full name: Jule Marie Bleuel
- Born: 20 March 2001 (age 25) Munich, Germany

Sport
- Sport: Field hockey
- Position: Midfield
Senior career
Years	Team	Caps	Goals
–2018	ESV München	-	-
2018–2023	Münchner SC	-	-
2023–	Club an der Alster	-	-
National team
Years	Team	Caps	Goals
2019–2022	Germany U–21	18	(2)
2021–	Germany	28	(1)
Medal record
Women's field hockey
Representing Germany
FIH Pro League
Silver medal – second place	Season Five
FIH Junior World Cup
Silver medal – second place	2022 Potchefstroom
EuroHockey U21 Championship
Gold medal – first place	2022 Ghent
Bronze medal – third place	2019 Valencia

Jule Marie Bleuel (born 20 March 2001) is a field hockey player from Germany.

== Personal life ==
Jule Bleuel was born in Munich, Germany.

== Field hockey ==
=== Domestic league ===
Throughout her junior career, Bleuel represented ESV München, before moving to Münchner SC in 2018. She represented the team in the Bundesliga until 2023, when she made the move to Club an der Alster.

=== Under–21 ===
Bleuel was a member of the national junior team from 2019 until 2022. During her time with the team, she won medals at three tournaments. She won silver at the 2022 FIH Junior World Cup in Potchefstroom, and gold and bronze medals at the 2022 and 2019 edition of the EuroHockey U21 Championship in Valencia and Ghent, respectively.

=== Die Danas ===
Bleuel made her senior international debut in 2021. She earned her first cap during season three of the FIH Pro League, in a match against Belgium in Antwerp.

Since her debut, Bleuel has been a regular inclusion in Die Danas squad. She has appeared in every season of the FIH Pro League since her debut, and has most recently been named in the travelling squad for season seven matches in Valencia.
