= Marleen Jochems =

Dutch field hockey player

Personal information
- Born: 24 January 2000 (age 26) Baarn, Netherlands
- Height: 168 cm (5 ft 6 in)

Sport
- Sport: Field hockey
- Position: Midfielder
- Club: SCHC
Medal record
Olympic Games
Gold medal – first place	2024 Paris	Team
World Cup
Silver medal – second place	2026 Wavre/Amstelveen
EuroHockey Championship
Gold medal – first place	2025 Mönchengladbach

Marleen Jochems (born 24 January 2000) is a Dutch field hockey player. She represented Netherlands at the 2024 Summer Olympics.
