= Victoria Miranda =

Argentine field hockey player (born 2000)

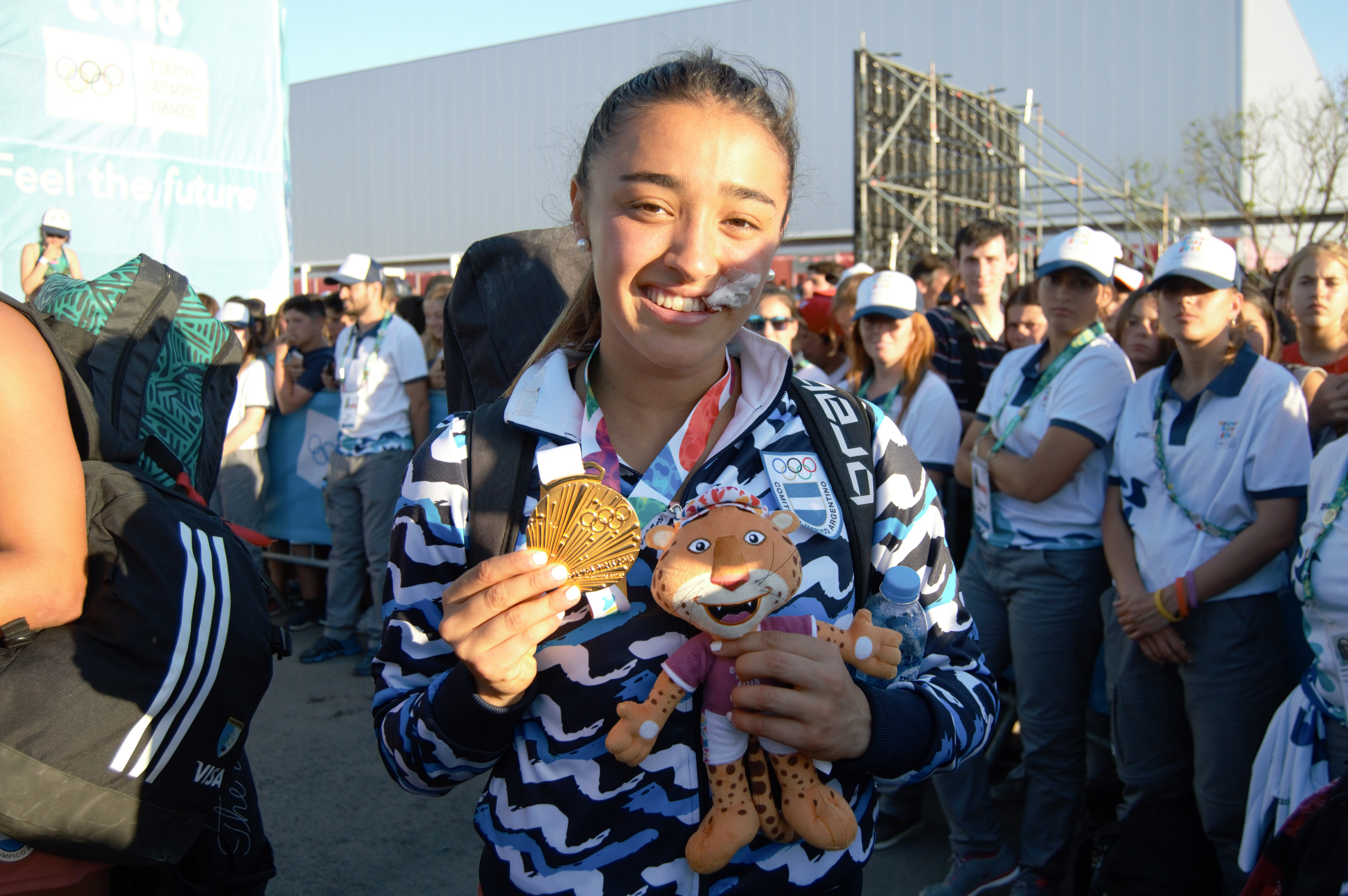

Personal information
- Born: 5 June 2000 (age 26) Argentina
- Height: 166 cm (5 ft 5 in)
- Weight: 63 kg (139 lb)

Sport
- Sport: Field hockey
- Position: Defender
- Club: Ciudad
National team
Years	Team	Caps	Goals
2017–Present	Argentina U18	15	(10)
2019–Present	Argentina	9	-
Medal record
World Cup
Gold medal – first place	2026 Wavre/Amstelveen
Pan American Cup
Gold medal – first place	2025 Montevideo
Youth Olympics
Gold medal – first place	2018 Buenos Aires

Victoria Miranda (born 5 June 2000) is an Argentine field hockey player.

== Hockey career ==
In 2019, Miranda was called into the senior national women's team. She competed in the team that finished fourth at the 2019 Pro League in Amstelveen.

She won a gold medal at the 2018 Youth Olympics in Buenos Aires.
