= Caoimhe Perdue =

Irish field hockey player

Personal information
- Full name: Caoimhe Margaret Perdue
- Born: 4 May 2000 (age 26) Cashel, Ireland

Sport
- Sport: Field hockey
- Position: Defender
National team
Years	Team	Caps	Goals
2019–2022	Ireland U–21	10	(3)
2022–	Ireland	0	(0)
Medal record
Women's field hockey
Representing Ireland
FIH Nations Cup
Silver medal – second place	2023–24 Terrassa

Caoimhe Perdue (born 4 May 2000) is a field hockey player from Ireland.

== Personal life ==
Caoimhe Perdue was born and raised in Cashel, County Tipperary.

She is currently a student at University College Cork, where she studies Nutritional Sciences.

== Career ==
=== Under–21 ===
Perdue made her debut for the Ireland U–21 team in 2019 at the EuroHockey Junior Championship in Valencia.

In 2022, she captained the team at the FIH Junior World Cup in Potchefstroom.

=== National team ===
Following her successful career in the junior squad, Perdue was named in the national team for the 2022 FIH World Cup in Terrassa and Amsterdam.
