= Guadalupe Adorno =

Argentine field hockey player (born 2000)

Personal information
- Born: 21 February 2000 (age 26) Asunción, Paraguay
- Height: 1.69 m (5 ft 7 in)
- Weight: 60 kg (132 lb)

Sport
- Sport: Field hockey
- Position: Forward
- Club: Quilmes
Senior career
Years	Team	Caps	Goals
–Present	Quilmes	-	-
National team
Years	Team	Caps	Goals
2022–Present	Argentina	0	-

Guadalupe Adorno (born 21 February 2000) is a Paraguayan-born Argentine field hockey player.

== Hockey career ==
In 2022, Adorno was called into the senior national women's team.
