= Elisa Civetta =

Uruguayan field hockey player

Personal information
- Born: 2 January 2003 (age 23) Uruguay
- Height: 167 cm (5 ft 6 in)
- Weight: 63 kg (139 lb)

Sport
- Sport: Field hockey
- Position: Forward
National team
Years	Team	Caps	Goals
2018	Uruguay U–18	11	(4)
2021–2023	Uruguay U–21	14	(10)
2023–	Uruguay	2	(0)
Medal record
Representing Uruguay
Women's field hockey
Pan American Cup
Bronze medal – third place	2025 Montevideo
Pan American Junior Championship
Silver medal – second place	2021 Santiago

Elisa Civetta (born 2 January 2003) is a Uruguayan field hockey player, who plays as a forward.

== Career ==
=== Under–18 ===
In 2018, Civetta was a member of the Uruguay U–18 team at the Youth Olympic Games in Buenos Aires.

=== Under–21 ===
Civetta made her debut for the Uruguay U–21 at the 2021 Pan American Junior Championship in Santiago, Chile. At the tournament, she won a silver medal, earning the team qualification for the FIH Junior World Cup in Potchefstroom.

In 2023 she captained the team at her second Pan American Junior Championship in Bridgetown, Barbados.

=== Las Cimarronas ===
Civetta made her senior international debut for Las Cimarronas in 2023, during the three-nations series in Montevideo. Later that year she was named in the squad for the Pan American Games in Santiago.
