= Constanza Cerundolo =

Argentine field hockey player

María Constanza Cerundolo
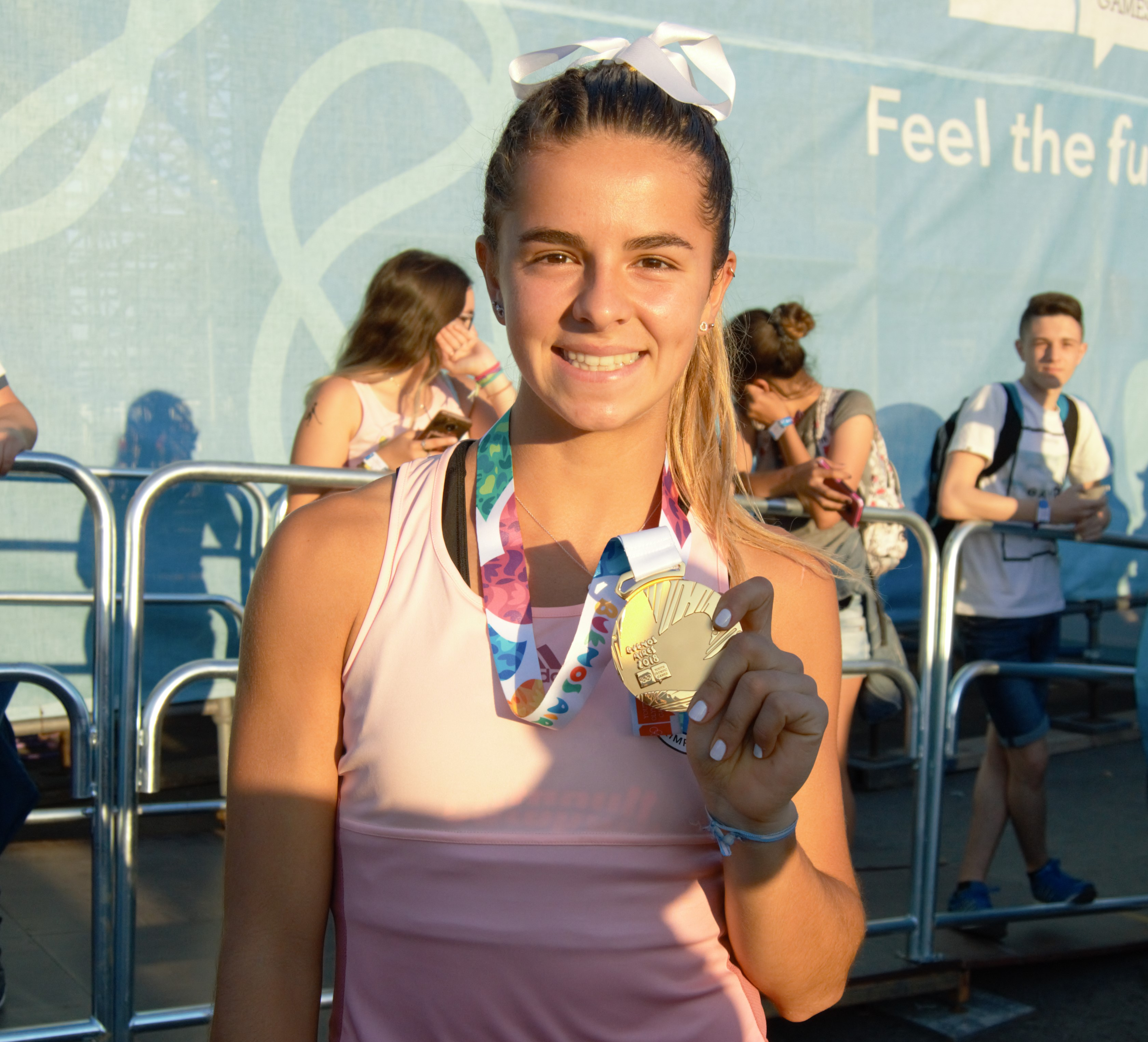
- Constanza Cerundolo

Personal information
- Born: 19 June 2000 (age 26) Argentina

Sport
- Sport: Field hockey
- Position: Defender
- Club: Belgrano
National team
Years	Team	Caps	Goals
2018–Present	Argentina U18	15	-
2019–Present	Argentina	2	-
Medal record
Youth Olympics
Gold medal – first place	2018 Buenos Aires

María Constanza Cerundolo (Italian: [tʃeˈrundolo]; born 19 June 2000) is an Argentine field hockey player.

== Hockey career ==
In 2019, Cerundolo was called into the senior national women's team.

She won a gold medal at the 2018 Youth Olympics in Buenos Aires.
