= 2025 Women's EuroHockey Championship squads =

This article lists the confirmed squads for the 2025 Women's EuroHockey Championship tournament held in Mönchengladbach, Germany between 8 and 17 August 2025. The eight national teams were required to register a playing squad of eighteen players and two reserves.

== Pool A ==
=== France ===
Head coach: Gaël Foulard

France announced their final squad on 29 July 2025.

1. Violette Ferront (GK)
2. Noémie Mekki
3. Catherine Clot
4. Emma Ponthieu (C)
5. Mickaela Lahlah
6. Marie-Alice Pelletier
7. Paola Le Nindre
8. Yohanna Lhopital
14. Gabrielle Verrier
15. Emma van der Zanden
19. Mathilde Duffrène
21. Pauline Varoqui
22. Ève Verzura
23. Inès Lardeur
24. Lucie Ehrmann (GK)
25. Albane Garot
27. Delfina Gaspari
28. Tessa-Margot Schubert

=== Germany ===
Head coach: (Netherlands) Janneke Schopman

Germany announced their final squad on 1 July 2025.

3. Amelie Wortmann
5. Selin Oruz
7. Linnea Weidemann (C)
8. Sophia Schwabe
10. Lisa Nolte (C)
11. Lena Micheel
12. Ines Wanner
15. Nathalie Kubalski (GK)
16. Sonja Zimmermann
18. Lilly Stoffelsma
20. Julia Sonntag (GK)
21. Sara Strauss
23. Emma Davidsmeyer
25. Johanna Hachenberg
26. Felicia Wiedermann
28. Jette Fleschütz
30. Hanna Granitzki
55. Emilia Landshut

=== Ireland ===
Head coach: Gareth Grundie

Ireland announced their final squad on 24 July 2025.

2. Elizabeth Murphy (GK)
3. Sarah McAuley
5. Michelle Carey
6. Róisín Upton
7. Niamh Carey
8. Sarah Hawkshaw (C)
9. Kathryn Mullan
10. Hannah McLoughlin
11. Sarah Torrans
14. Ellen Curran
15. Caoimhe Perdue
16. Charlotte Beggs
17. Christina Hamill
21. Katie McKee
23. Holly Micklem (GK)
28. Katie Larmour
29. Mikayla Power
30. Emily Kealy

=== Netherlands ===
Head coach: Raoul Ehren

The Netherlands announced their final squad on 28 July 2025.

1. Anne Veenendaal (GK)
2. Luna Fokke
5. Lisa Post
7. Xan de Waard
8. Yibbi Jansen
9. Renée van Laarhoven
11. Pien Sanders (C)
14. Sanne Koolen
15. Frédérique Matla
16. Joosje Burg
17. Marleen Jochems
18. Freeke Moes
19. Marijn Veen
21. Pien Dicke
22. Josine Koning (GK)
29. Fay van der Elst
35. Pam van der Laan
36. Danique van der Veerdonk

== Pool B ==
=== Belgium ===
Head coach: (Netherlands) Rein van Eijk

Belgium announced their final squad on 30 June 2025.

3. Justine Rasir
4. Delphine Marien
6. Charlotte Englebert
7. Judith Vandermeiren
8. Emma Puvrez
13. Alix Gerniers (C)
17. Michelle Struijk (C)
19. Hélène Brasseur
22. Stéphanie Vanden Borre
23. Elena Sotgiu (GK)
26. Lien Hillewaert
28. Lisa Moors
29. Elodie Picard (GK)
30. Ambre Ballenghien
31. Lucie Breyne
32. Louise Dewaet
40. Camille Belis
41. Astrid Bonami

=== England ===
Head coach: (Scotland) David Ralph

England announced their final squad on 22 July 2025.

2. Darcy Bourne
4. Lily Walker (C)
6. Anna Toman
13. Elena Rayer
14. Tessa Howard
16. Isabelle Petter
18. Katharine Curtis
19. Olivia Hamilton
21. Fiona Crackles
22. Elizabeth Neal
23. Sophie Hamilton (C)
24. Madeleine Axford
25. Sabrina Heesh (GK)
26. Lily Owsley
28. Flora Peel
30. Martha Taylor
31. Grace Balsdon
40. Miriam Pritchard (GK)

=== Scotland ===
Head coach: Chris Duncan

Scotland announced their final squad on 10 July 2025.

1. Jennifer Eadie
2. Amber Murray (GK)
3. Caterina Nelli
4. Eve Pearson
8. Amy Costello (VC)
10. Sarah Robertson (C)
11. Katie Birch
12. Charlotte Watson
13. Ruth Blaikie
15. Heather McEwan
17. Sarah Jamieson (VC)
18. Millie Steiger
20. Bronwyn Shields
23. Jessica Buchanan (GK)
25. Rebecca Birch
27. Fiona Burnet
35. Ellie Mackenzie
37. Ava Findlay

=== Spain ===
Head coach: Carlos García Cuenca

Spain announced their final squad on 3 August 2025.

4. Sara Barrios
5. Berta Serrahima
6. Clara Badia
7. Florencia Amundson
8. Lucía Jiménez (C)
9. Teresa Lima
10. Patricia Álvarez
11. Marta Segú
13. Constanza Amundson
16. Candela Mejías
17. Luciana Molina
18. Berta Agulló
20. Xantal Giné (C)
22. Laia Vidosa
24. Estel Petchamé
26. Clara Pérez (GK)
29. Paula Jiménez
32. Jana Martínez (GK)
