= 2025 Women's EuroHockey Championship Qualifiers =

Field hockey tournaments

Tournament details
- Host countries: France; Scotland
- Dates: 22–25 August 2024
- Teams: 13 (from 1 confederation)
- Venue: 2 (in 2 host cities)

Tournament statistics
- Matches played: 16
- Goals scored: 88 (5.5 per match)
- Top scorer: (Switzerland) Sofie Stomps (11 goals)

The 2025 Women's EuroHockey Championship Qualifiers was a series of 2 qualification events for the 2025 EuroHockey Championships in Mönchengladbach, Germany. The tournaments were held in Douai, France and Glasgow, Scotland between 22 and 25 August 2024.

The winner from each tournament qualified for the 2025 EuroHockey Championship.

== Qualification ==
All eligible teams from the EuroHockey Championships II and III and the two lowest-ranked teams from the EuroHockey Championships participated.

Dates	Event	Location	Quotas	Qualifiers
25–28 July 2023	2023 EuroHockey Championship III	Zagreb, Croatia	3	Croatia; Switzerland; Turkey
30 July – 5 August 2023	2023 EuroHockey Championship II	Prague, Czechia	7	Austria; Czechia; France; Poland; Lithuania; Ukraine; Wales
18–26 August 2023	2023 EuroHockey Championship	Mönchengladbach, Germany	2	Italy; Scotland
–	Invitational		1	Luxembourg
Total			13	

== Qualifier A ==
2024 Women's EuroHockey Championship Qualifier A
Tournament details
- Host country: Scotland
- City: Glasgow
- Dates: 22–25 August
- Teams: 6 (from 1 confederation)
- Venue: Glasgow National Hockey Centre

Final positions
- Champions: Scotland
- Runner-up: Wales
- Third place: Czechia

Tournament statistics
- Matches played: 7
- Goals scored: 24 (3.43 per match)
- Top scorer(s): (Czech Republic) Veronika Decsy (Wales) Elizabeth Bingham (Wales) Amy Cradden (Wales) Olivia Hoskins (Wales) Holly Munro (2 goals)
- Best player: (Austria) Fiona Felber
- Best goalkeeper: (Austria) Stella van Rahden

Qualifier A was held at the Glasgow National Hockey Centre in Glasgow, Scotland from 22 to 25 August 2024. The hosts, Scotland, won the tournament and qualified for the 2025 Women's EuroHockey Championship after defeating Wales 2–1 in the final.

=== Bracket ===
Quarter-finals
22 August
Austria	1
Lithuania	0
22 August
Wales	7
Croatia	0

Semi-finals
24 August
Scotland	1
Austria	0
24 August
Czechia	0
Wales	4

Final
25 August
Scotland	2
Wales	1
Third place
25 August
Austria	2
Czechia	3

=== Quarter-finals ===
22 August 2024
16:15

Wales	7–0	Croatia
Thomas 9'; Diamond 21'; Munro 23', 43'; Cradden 35'; Goodwin 42'; Witham 45'	Report

Umpires:
Ana Faias (POR)
Katie Howie (SCO)

22 August 2024
18:30

Austria	1–0	Lithuania
Pultar 52'	Report

Umpires:
Ivona Makar (CRO)
Zoe Hall (ENG)

=== Semi-finals ===
24 August 2024
12:00

Czechia	0–4	Wales
	Report	Bingham 9'; Hoskins 20', 58'; Cradden 54'

Umpires:
Katie Howie (SCO)
Ivona Makar (CRO)

24 August 2024
14:15

Scotland	1–0	Austria
S. Robertson 42'	Report

Umpires:
Ana Faias (POR)
Zoe Hall (ENG)

=== Classification matches ===
==== Fifth and sixth place ====
23 August 2024
18:30

Croatia	0–3	Lithuania
	Report	Siebé 26'; Juraite 37'; Jakovleva 51'

Umpires:
Liz Clifford (IRL)
Lorijn de Kraker (NED)

==== Third and fourth place ====
25 August 2024
11:00

Austria	2–3	Czechia
Haselsteiner 5'; Kern 59'	Report	Decsy 45', 59'; Bašová 55'

Umpires:
Ana Faias (POR)
Liz Clifford (IRL)

==== Final ====
25 August 2024
13:15

Scotland	2–1	Wales
Jamieson 19'; McEwan 37'	Report	Bingham 18'

Umpires:
Ivona Makar (CRO)
Lorijn de Kraker (NED)

=== Final standings ===
Pos	Team	Qualification
1	Scotland (H)	2025 EuroHockey Championship
2	Wales	2025 EuroHockey Championship II
3	Czechia	2025 EuroHockey Championship II
4	Austria	2025 EuroHockey Championship II
5	Lithuania	2025 EuroHockey Championship II
6	Croatia	2025 EuroHockey Championship III

Source: FIH
(H) Host

== Qualifier B ==
Qualifier B
Tournament details
- Host country: France
- City: Douai
- Dates: 22–25 August
- Teams: 7 (from 1 confederation)
- Venue: Douai HC

Final positions
- Champions: France
- Runner-up: Poland
- Third place: Italy

Tournament statistics
- Matches played: 9
- Goals scored: 64 (7.11 per match)
- Top scorer: (Switzerland) Sofie Stomps (11 goals)
- Best player: (Poland) Marlena Rybacha

Qualifier A will be held in Douai, France.

=== Bracket ===
Quarter-finals
22 August
Poland	5
Türkiye	1
22 August
France	22
Luxembourg	0
22 August
Ukraine	4
Switzerland	1

Semi-finals
24 August
Italy	0 (1)
Poland (s.o.)	0 (3)
24 August
France	3
Ukraine	2

Final
25 August
Poland	0
France	2
Third place
25 August
Italy	2
Ukraine	0

=== Quarter-finals ===
22 August 2024
13:00

Poland	5–1	Türkiye
Katerla 16'; Strubbe 30'; Diurczak 38'; Pabiniak 39'; Suszynska 54'	Report	Şahiner 39'

Umpires:
Sandra Adell (ESP)
Lisette Baljon (NED)

22 August 2024
15:15

Ukraine	4–1	Switzerland
Leonova 15', 51'; Zaitseva 17'; Movchan 40'	Report	Stomps 25'

Umpires:
Magali Sergeant (BEL)
Ellie Duffy (IRL)

22 August 2024
17:30

France	22–0	Luxembourg
Lardeur 2'; Lhopital 5', 7', 47', 53'; Le Nindre 9', 18', 31', 34', 41'; Lahlah 12', 56'; Delemazure 14', 15', 45'; Verrier 21'; Arnaud 36', 44', 51'; Gaspari 39'; Lesgourgues 50', 54'	Report

Umpires:
Ilaria Amorosini (ITA)
Sophie Bockelmann (GER)

=== Fifth to seventh place classification ===
Crossover
23 August
Luxembourg	0
Switzerland	14

Fifth place
25 August
Turkey	2
Switzerland	6

==== Crossover ====
23 August 2024
17:30

Luxembourg	0–14	Switzerland
	Report	Pöhler 5', 45'; Stomps 7', 18', 51', 53', 60'; Trösch 10', 32'; Zepf 15'; Appel 30'; Hardeman 36', 42'; Paulisch 47'

Umpires:
Kamile Mockaityte (LTU)
Magali Sergeant (BEL)

==== Fifth and sixth place ====
25 August 2024
09:30

Turkey	2–6	Switzerland
Erkoç 13', 34'	Report	Stomps 27', 28', 29', 42', 44'; Appel 55'

Umpires:
Ilaria Amorosini (ITA)
Lisette Baljon (NED)

=== First to fourth place classification ===
==== Semi-finals ====
24 August 2024
12:00

Italy	0–0	Poland
	Report
Penalties
Carta (penalty shoot-out scored); Bormida (penalty shoot-out missed); Moras (penalty shoot-out missed); L. Oviedo (penalty shoot-out missed)	1–3	(penalty shoot-out scored) Balcerzak; (penalty shoot-out scored) Katerla; (penalty shoot-out missed) Polewczak; (penalty shoot-out scored) Skoraszewska

24 August 2024
12:00

France	3–2	Ukraine
Verrier 10'; Duffrène 27'; Gaspari 48'	Report	Voievoda 36', 49'

Umpires:
Lisette Baljon (NED)
Ilaria Amorosini (ITA)

==== Third and fourth place ====
25 August 2024
11:45

Italy	2–0	Ukraine
Carta 35'; L. Oviedo 42'	Report

Umpires:
Sophie Bockelmann (GER)
Ellie Duffy (WAL)

==== Final ====
25 August 2024
14:00

Poland	0–2	France
	Report	Duffrène 13'; Lesgourgues 26'

Umpires:
Magali Sergeant (BEL)
Sandra Adell (ESP)

=== Final standings ===
Pos	Team	Qualification
1	France (H)	2025 EuroHockey Championship
2	Poland	2025 EuroHockey Championship II
3	Italy	2025 EuroHockey Championship II
4	Ukraine	2025 EuroHockey Championship II
5	Switzerland	2025 EuroHockey Championship II
6	Turkey	2025 EuroHockey Championship III
7	Luxembourg	2025 EuroHockey Championship III

Source: FIH
(H) Host
