= Delfina Gaspari =

Franch field hockey player

Personal information
- Born: 30 April 1998 (age 28) Martínez, Argentina
- Height: 163 cm (5 ft 4 in)
- Weight: 55 kg (121 lb)

Sport
- Sport: Field hockey
- Position: Forward
- Club: Saint Germain
National team
Years	Team	Caps	Goals
2016–	France	74	(8)
2016–2019	France U–21	15	(2)
Medal record
Women's field hockey
Representing France
EuroHockey Championship II
Gold medal – first place	2023 Prague	Team
Silver medal – second place	2021 Prague	Team
EuroHockey Championship III
Gold medal – first place	2019 Lipovci	Team
FIH Nations Cup II
Gold medal – first place	2024–25 Wałcz	Team
FIH Hockey Series
Bronze medal – third place	2018–19 Wattignies	Open

Delfina Gaspari (born 30 April 1998) is a field hockey player from France.

== Early life ==
Delfina Gaspari was born in Martínez, a suburb in Greater Buenos Aires, Argentina. After her birth, her family relocated to Gobernador Juan E. Martínez, a small town in the Corrientes Province.

== Career ==
=== Domestic hockey ===
Gaspari currently competes in the French National League for Saint Germain.

In the past she has also competed in the Carlsberg 0.0 Hockey League, the top–level domestic competition in Belgium, and the Euro Hockey League. During her time in the league, she was a member of the attacking unit for Gantoise.

=== Under–21 ===
From 2016 until 2019, Gaspari was a member of the French U–21 team. She represented the team at the 2016 FIH Junior World Cup in Santiago, as well as the 2017 and 2019 editions of the EuroHockey U–21 Championship, both of which were held in Valencia.

=== Senior national team ===
Prior to making her junior debut, Gaspari made her first international appearance with the French national team. She made her senior international debut in a match against Switzerland, during Round 1 of the 2016–17 FIH World League in Douai.

Since her sebut, Gaspari has been a constant inclusion in the national team and has medalled on numerous occasions. She won gold at the 2023 EuroHockey Championship II in Prague, silver at the 2021 EuroHockey Championship II in Prague, gold at the 2019 EuroHockey Championship III in Lipovci, and bronze at the 2018–19 FIH Series Open in Wattignies.

In 2024, Gaspari became an Olympian. She was named in the French squad for the XXXIII Summer Olympics in Paris.

Since the Olympic Games, she has continued to represent the national team, and was most recently named in the squad for the 2024–25 FIH Nations Cup II in Wałcz.

Major International Tournaments

- 2016–17 FIH World League
  - Round 1 – Douai
- 2017 EuroHockey Championship II – Cardiff
- 2018–19 FIH Hockey Series
  - Open – Wattignies
  - Finals – Banbridge
- 2021 EuroHockey Championship III – Lipovci
- 2021 EuroHockey Championship II – Prague
- 2022 FIH World Cup Qualifier – Pisa
- 2023 EuroHockey Championship II – Prague
- 2024 Olympics Games – Paris
- 2024–25 FIH Nations Cup II – Wałcz

== International goals ==
The following is a list of goals scored by Gaspari at international level.

Goal	Date	Location	Opponent	Score	Result	Competition	Ref.
1	2 June 2019	Sport Wales National Centre, Cardiff, Wales	Wales	2–0	3–0	Test Match	
2	13 June 2019	Banbridge Hockey Club, Banbridge, Northern Ireland	Malaysia	1–2	2–3	2018–19 FIH Series Finals	
3	28 July 2019	HC Lipovci, Lipovci, Slovenia	Slovenia	1–0	16–0	2019 EuroHockey Championship III	
4	5 August 2021	Centralny Ośrodek Sportu, Wałcz, Poland	Poland	2–1	3–1	Test Match	
5	27 August 2022	Hockey Club de Dunkerque Malo, Dunkirk, France	Austria	2–0	4–0	2023 EuroHockey Championship Qualifier D	
6	31 July 2023	SK Slavia Prague, Prague, Czech Republic	Wales	3–1	3–1	2023 EuroHockey Championship II	
7	22 August 2024	Douai Hockey Club, Douai, France	Luxembourg	13–0	22–0	2025 EuroHockey Championship Qualifier B	
8	24 August 2024	Douai Hockey Club, Douai, France	Ukraine	3–1	3–2	2025 EuroHockey Championship Qualifier B	
