= Inès Lardeur =

Franch field hockey player

Personal information
- Born: 26 March 1996 (age 30) Lille, France
- Height: 178 cm (5 ft 10 in)
- Weight: 72 kg (159 lb)

Sport
- Sport: Field hockey
- Position: Midfield
- Club: Royal Léopold
National team
Years	Team	Caps	Goals
2014–2017	France U–21	14	(0)
2014–	France	105	(14)
Medal record
Women's field hockey
Representing France
EuroHockey Championship II
Gold medal – first place	2023 Prague	Team
Silver medal – second place	2021 Prague	Team
EuroHockey Championship III
Gold medal – first place	2019 Lipovci	Team
FIH Nations Cup II
Gold medal – first place	2024–25 Wałcz
FIH Series Open
Bronze medal – third place	2018–19 Wattignies	Team

Inès Lardeur (born 26 March 1996) is a French field hockey player.

== Early life ==
Inès Lardeur was born on 26 March 1996 in Lille.

She is openly lesbian.

== Career ==
=== Domestic hockey ===
Lardeur currently competes in the Women's Belgian Hockey League, the top–level domestic competition in Belgium. In the league, she represents Royal Léopold.

=== Under–21 ===
From 2014 until 2017, Lardeur represented the French U–21 team. She was a member of the squad at the EuroHockey U–21 Championship in 2014 in Waterloo and 2017 in Valencia. She also represented the team at the 2016 FIH Junior World Cup in Santiago, where the team finished in fifteenth place.

=== Senior national team ===
Lardeur made her senior international debut for France in 2014.

Since her sebut, Lardeur has been a constant inclusion in the national team and has medalled on numerous occasions. She won gold at the 2023 EuroHockey Championship II in Prague, silver at the 2021 EuroHockey Championship II in Prague, gold at the 2019 EuroHockey Championship III in Lipovci, and bronze at the 2018–19 FIH Series Open in Wattignies.

In 2024, Lardeur became an Olympian. She was named in the French squad for the XXXIII Summer Olympics in Paris.

Since the Olympic Games, Le Nindre has continued to represent the national team. She was most recently named in the squad for the 2024–25 FIH Nations Cup II in Wałcz.

Major International Tournaments

- 2014–15 FIH World League
  - Round 1 – Hradec Králové
  - Round 2 – Montevideo
  - Semi–Finals – Antwerp
- 2015 EuroHockey Championship II – Prague
- 2016–17 FIH World League
  - Round 1 – Douai
- 2017 EuroHockey Championship II – Cardiff
- 2018–19 FIH Hockey Series
  - Open – Wattignies
- 2019 EuroHockey Championship III – Lipovci
- 2021 EuroHockey Championship II – Prague
- 2023 EuroHockey Championship II – Prague
- 2024 Olympics Games – Paris
- 2024–25 FIH Nations Cup II – Wałcz

== International goals ==
The following is a list of goals scored by Lardeur at international level.

Goal	Date	Location	Opponent	Score	Result	Competition	Ref.
1	5 September 2014	HC Slavia Hradec Králové, Hradec Králové, Czech Republic	Czech Republic	3–1	4–4 (1–2)	2014–15 FIH World League Round 1	
2	5 September 2014	HC Slavia Hradec Králové, Hradec Králové, Czech Republic	Czech Republic	4–4	4–4 (1–2)	2014–15 FIH World League Round 1	
3	20 February 2015	Cancha Nautico, Montevideo, Uruguay	Kenya	1–0	5–0	2014–15 FIH World League Round 2	
4	14 September 2016	Douai Hockey Club, Douai, France	Switzerland	2–1	4–1	2016–17 FIH World League Round 1	
5	14 September 2016	Douai Hockey Club, Douai, France	Switzerland	3–1	4–1	2016–17 FIH World League Round 1	
6	26 February 2019	Antibes Hockey, Antibes, France	Wales	2–1	2–1	Test Match	
7	28 July 2019	HC Lipovci, Lipovci, Slovenia	Slovenia	15–0	16–0	2019 EuroHockey Championship III	
8	24 October 2021	CUS Pisa, Pisa, Italy	Poland	4–2	4–2	2022 FIH World Cup – European Qualifier	
9	22 July 2023	Salon Hockey Club, Salon-de-Provence, France	Scotland	3–1	3–2	Test Match	
10	30 July 2023	SK Slavia Prague, Prague, Czech Republic	Lithuania	4–0	8–0	2023 EuroHockey Championship II	
11	26 January 2024	South African College Schools, Newlands, South Africa	South Africa	1–0	1–0	Test Match	
12	28 January 2024	South African College Schools, Newlands, South Africa	South Africa	1–0	4–1	Test Match	
13	22 August 2024	Douai Hockey Club, Douai, France	Luxembourg	1–0	22–0	2025 EuroHockey Championship Qualifier B	
14	17 June 2024	Centralny Ośrodek Sportu, Wałcz, Poland	Italy	2–0	4–0	2024–25 FIH Nations Cup 2	
