= 2024–25 Women's FIH Hockey Nations Cup 2 =

International field hockey tournament

Tournament details
- Host country: Poland
- City: Wałcz
- Dates: 16–22 June
- Teams: 8 (from 4 confederations)

Final positions
- Champions: France (1st title)
- Runner-up: Uruguay
- Third place: Wales

Tournament statistics
- Matches played: 20
- Goals scored: 72 (3.6 per match)
- Top scorer: (Uruguay) Manuela Vilar (5 goals)
- Best player: (Uruguay) Manuela Vilar
- Best young player: (France) Mathilde Duffrène
- Best goalkeeper: (Poland) Marta Kucharska

The 2024–25 Women's FIH Hockey Nations Cup 2 is the first edition of the Women's FIH Hockey Nations Cup 2, the annual qualification tournament for the FIH Hockey Nations Cup organised by the International Hockey Federation. The tournament is held in Wałcz, Poland from 16 to 22 June 2025.

The defending champions France defended their title by defeating Uruguay 3–1 in a shoot-out after the match finished 3–3.

== Teams ==
The eight highest ranked teams not participating in the 2024–25 Women's FIH Pro League and 2024–25 Women's FIH Hockey Nations Cup participate in the tournament.

Czechia

Head Coach: Tomás Procházká

1. Anna Linková (GK)
2. Kateřina Laciná (C)
3. Lucie Duchková
4. Linda Nováková
5. Eliška Hraníčková
6. Kamila Kopecká
7. Veronika Pribiková
8. Natálie Nováková
9. Zuzana Semrádová
10. Anna Kolářová
11. Linda Nedvĕdová
12. Anna Vorlová
13. Nikol Babická
14. Nela Tlamsová
15. Apolena Al-Amelová
16. Natálie Hájková
17. Adéla Uhrová
18. Eliška Fousková
19. Veronika Decsoyová
20. Diana Svyščuk (GK)
France

Head Coach: Gael Foulard

2. Noémie Mekki
3. Catherine Clot
4. Emma Ponthieu (C)
5. Mickaela Lahlah
6. Marie-Alice Pelletier Rimbert
7. Paola Le Nindre
8. Yohanna Lhopital
12. Fanny Raby
13. Ella Dumont
14. Gabrielle Verrier
17. Victoire Arnaud
19. Mathilde Duffrène
22. Eve Verzura
23. Inès Lardeur
24. Lucie Ehrmann (GK)
25. Albane Garot
27. Delfina Gaspari
28. Tessa-Margot Schubert
29. Axelle Wiart
33. Amelya Lison (GK)
Italy

Head Coach: Andrés Mondo

8. Teresa Dalla Vittoria
3. Victoria Cabut
4. Ailin Oviedo
5. Francheschini Fabiola
6. Di Paola Eleonora
9. Guadalupe Moras
13. Lola Brea
14. Antonella Bruni
15. Maria Lunghi
16. Ilaria Sarnari
17. Elettra Bormida
18. Federica Carta (C)
21. Sara Puglisi (C)
22. Maria Agustina Fiorelli
24. Justina Aspillaga
25. Delfina Granatto
26. Sofia Laurito
30. Sofia Vercelli
32. Augustina D’Ascola (GK)
99. Silvia Omegna (GK)
Malaysia

Head Coach: Nasihin Ibrahim

1. Siti Nasir (GK)
2. Zati Muhamad
4. Siti Mohd
5. Dayang Abang
6. Zawiatul Hartomo
7. Azmyra Azhairy
8. Juliani Din (C)
10. Siti Mohd
11. Nur Azhar
12. Hanis Onn
13. Nur Mohd
14. Siti Shaikh
15. Nur Che
17. Anith Humaira Baharudin
18. Nur Mohammed
19. Insyirah Effarizal
20. Fitrinur Ramlee (GK)
21. Fatin Sukri
22. Siti Husain
24. Nurul Azman
25. Khairunnisa Mohd
26. Nuramirah Zulkifli
27. Nurmaizatul Syafi
32. Nur Zainal (GK)
33. Nur Yussaini
35. Noor Hasliza Ali
Poland

Head Coach: Krzysztof Rachwalski

1. Ewa Lewandowska (GK)
2. Julia Kucharska
3. Patrycja Kosińska
4. Amelia Katerla
5. Julia Rymer
7. Oliwia Krychniak
8. Wiktoria Blaszyk
9. Karolina Lisowska
10. Daria Skoraszewska
11. Hanna Wochna
12. Anna Gabara (GK)
13. Karolina Diurczak
14. Jagoda Arciszewska
15. Maria Drozda
16. Marlena Rybacha (C)
17. Monika Chmiel
19. Marta Czujewicz
20. Sandra Tatarczuk
21. Marta Kucharska (GK)
22. Magdalena Pabiniak
24. Julia Balcerzak
25. Bianca Strubbe
27. Natasza Suszynska
29. Zuzanna Rubacha
30. Viktoria Zimmermann
32. Sandra Hoffmann (GK)
South Africa

Head Coach: Inky Zondi

4. Stephanie Botha
5. Edith Molikoe
10. Onthatile Zulu
12. Ntsopa Mokoena
17. Charné Maddocks
18. Hannah Pearce
21. Ongeziwe Mali
23. Jean-Leigh du Toit
26. Cailynn den Bakker
27. Kayla de Waal
28. Quanita Bobbs (C)
31. Marlise van Tonder (GK)
32. Tegan Fourie
33. Aphiwe Dimba (GK)
35. Lerato Mahole
37. Cerian Fourie
38. Shanna Mendonça
39. Daniella de Oliveira
Uruguay

Head Coach: Rolando Rivero

1. María Montans (GK)
2. Florencia Peñalba
3. Martina Rago
4. Elisa Civetta
5. Pilar Oliveros
6. Camila de María
7. Agustina Martínez
8. Manuela Vilar (C)
9. Sol Amadeo
10. Agustina Alles
11. Guadalupe Curutchague
12. Magdalena Gómez
13. Teresa Viana (C)
14. María Barreiro
15. Manuela Barrandeguy
16. Manuela Quiñones
17. Kaisuami Dall'Orso
18. María Bate (GK)
Wales

Head Coach: Kevin Johnson

2. Rachel Goodwin
4. Caitlin Witham
5. Lily Roberts
8. Sarah Jones
9. Maisie Riley
12. Lauren Roberts (GK)
15. Elizabeth Bingham (C)
16. Emily Drysdale
18. Isabelle Howell
22. Ella Jackson (GK)
26. Anja Atkin
30. Jamie Bulbring
31. Charlotte Atkinson
32. Holly Done
33. Lucienne Daman
34. Millie Holme
38. Beth Peers
40. Amy Cradden
42. Rebecca Daniel
44. Ffion Horrell (GK)
46. Katie Partridge
59. Matilda Edwards
71. Betsan Thomas
96. Freya Diamond

== Preliminary round ==
All times are (UTC+2).

=== Pool A ===
Pos	Team	Pld	W	D	L	GF	GA	GD	Pts	Qualification
1	Uruguay	3	2	1	0	7	3	+4	7	Semi-finals
2	Poland (H)	3	2	1	0	6	3	+3	7	Semi-finals
3	South Africa	3	1	0	2	5	6	−1	3	
4	Malaysia	3	0	0	3	3	9	−6	0	

Source: FIH
Rules for classification: 1) points; 2) matches won; 3) goal difference; 4) goals for; 5) head-to-head result; 6) field goals scored.
(H) Hosts

16 June 2025
16:00

South Africa	0–2	Uruguay
	Report	Vilar 19', 28'

Umpires:
Ilaria Amorosini (ITA)
Sarah Craig (IRL)

16 June 2025
18:00

Malaysia	0–2	Poland
	Report	Tatarczuk 55', 60'

Umpires:
Rob Argent (IRL)
Teresa Lipsky (GER)

17 June 2025
16:00

Malaysia	1–3	South Africa
Abang 11'	Report	Mokoena 39'; Zulu 42'; Pearce 49'

Umpires:
Yogita Pasi (IND)
Meghan McLennan(CAN)

17 June 2025
18:00

Uruguay	1–1	Poland
Dall'Orso 7'	Report	Krychniak 47'

Umpires:
Ana Ortega (ESP)
Sharne Mayers (ZIM)

19 June 2025
16:00

Uruguay	4–2	Malaysia
Quiñones 10', 32'; Vilar 12'; Barrandeguy 24'	Report	Azhar 18', 27'

Umpires:
Kelly-Anne Foskin (NZL)
Teresa Lipsky (GER)

19 June 2025
18:00

South Africa	2–3	Poland
Bobbs 1'; De Oliveira 49'	Report	Wochna 4'; Krychniak 12'; Tatarczuk 21'

Umpires:
Jamie Telfer (SCO)
Sarah Craig (IRL)

=== Pool B ===
Pos	Team	Pld	W	D	L	GF	GA	GD	Pts	Qualification
1	France	3	3	0	0	9	1	+8	9	Semi-finals
2	Wales	3	1	1	1	6	5	+1	4	Semi-finals
3	Italy	3	1	1	1	7	7	0	4	
4	Czechia	3	0	0	3	0	9	−9	0	

Source: FIH
Rules for classification: 1) points; 2) matches won; 3) goal difference; 4) goals for; 5) head-to-head result; 6) field goals scored.

16 June 2025
12:00

Italy	3–3	Wales
Brea 6', 51'; Moras 36'	Report	Cradden 23'; Peers 28'; Holme 40'

Umpires:
Meghan McLennan (CAN)
Ana Ortega (ESP)

16 June 2025
14:00

France	3–0	Czechia
Le Nindre 34', 45'; Duffrène 40'	Report

Umpires:
Jamie Telfer (SCO)
Kelly-Anne Foskin (NZL)

17 June 2025
12:00

Wales	2–0	Czechia
Bingham 22'; Peers 54'	Report

Umpires:
Sarah Craig (IRL)
Rob Argent (IRL)

17 June 2025
14:00

France	4–0	Italy
Duffrène 6'; Lardeur 34'; Varoqui 40', 56'	Report

Umpires:
Teresa Lipsky (GER)
Jamie Telfer (SCO)

19 June 2025
12:00

Italy	4–0	Czechia
Lunghi 37'; Moras 44'; Oviedo 54'; Cabut 58'	Report

Umpires:
Sharne Mayers (ZIM)
Yogita Pasi (IND)

19 June 2025
14:00

Wales	1–2	France
Roberts 40'	Report	Lardeur 22'; Lhopital 33'

Umpires:
Ilaria Amorosini (ITA)
Meghan McLennan (CAN)

== Classification round ==
=== Bracket ===
Crossovers
21 June
South Africa	0
Czechia	1
21 June
Italy	5
Malaysia	0

Fifth place
22 June
Czechia (p.s.o.)	3 (2)
Italy	3 (1)
Seventh place
22 June
South Africa	1 (3)
Malaysia (p.s.o.)	1 (4)

=== Crossovers ===
21 June 2025
12:00

South Africa	0–1	Czechia
	Report	L. Nováková 7'

Umpires:
Ilaria Amorosini (ITA)
Yogita Pasi (IND)

21 June 2025
14:15

Italy	5–0	Malaysia
Lunghi 7'; Brea 17'; Bruni 26', 50'; Dalla Vittoria 45'	Report

Umpires:
Meghan McLennan (CAN)
Sharne Mayers (ZIM)

=== Seventh and eighth place ===
22 June 2025
12:00

South Africa	1–1	Malaysia
Maddocks 56'	Report	Azhar 49'
Penalties
Bobbs (penalty shoot-out scored); T. Fourie (penalty shoot-out missed); Zulu (penalty shoot-out scored); De Oliveira (penalty shoot-out missed); C. Fourie (penalty shoot-out scored)	3–4	(penalty shoot-out missed) Azhar; (penalty shoot-out scored) Zulkifli; (penalty shoot-out scored) Mohd; (penalty shoot-out scored) Mohammed; (penalty shoot-out scored) Sukri

Umpires:
Ilaria Amorosini (ITA)
Yogita Pasi (IND)

=== Fifth and sixth place ===
22 June 2025
14:15

Czechia	3–3	Italy
L. Nováková 5', 56'; Hájková 60'	Report	Cabut 8'; Brea 9'; Carta 34'
Penalties
L. Nováková (penalty shoot-out scored); Hájková (penalty shoot-out missed); Kolářová (penalty shoot-out missed); N. Nováková (penalty shoot-out missed); Babická (penalty shoot-out scored)	2–1	(penalty shoot-out scored) Carta; (penalty shoot-out missed) Moras; (penalty shoot-out missed) Lunghi; (penalty shoot-out missed) Fiorelli; (penalty shoot-out missed) Laurito

Umpires:
Sarah Craig (IRL)
Sharne Mayers (ZIM)

== Medal round ==
=== Bracket ===
Semi-finals
21 June
Uruguay	2
Wales	1
21 June
France	4
Poland	1

Final
22 June
Uruguay	3 (1)
France (p.s.o.)	3 (3)
Third place
22 June
Wales	1
Poland	0

=== Semi-finals ===
21 June 2025
16:30

Uruguay	2–1	Wales
Vilar 29'; Viana 34'	Report	Atkin 23'

Umpires:
Teresa Lipsky (GER)
Ana Ortega (ESP)

21 June 2025
18:45

France	4–1	Poland
Lhopital 4'; Verzura 26', 46', 57'	Report	Katerla 56'

Umpires:
Rob Argent (IRL)
Kelly-Anne Foskin (NZL)

=== Third and fourth place ===
22 June 2025
16:30

Wales	1–0	Poland
Roberts 35'	Report

Umpires:
Rob Argent (IRL)
Ana Ortega (ESP)

=== Final ===
22 June 2025
18:45

Uruguay	3–3	France
Quiñones 11'; Vilar 56'; Amadeo 59'	Report	Duffrène 15', 44'; Lhopital 57'
Penalties
Curutchague (penalty shoot-out missed); Viana (penalty shoot-out scored); Quiñones (penalty shoot-out missed); Civetta (penalty shoot-out missed)	1–3	(penalty shoot-out scored) Schubert; (penalty shoot-out scored) Verzura; (penalty shoot-out scored) Verzura

Umpires:
Jamie Telfer (SCO)
Kelly-Anne Foskin (NZL)

== Statistics ==
=== Final standings ===
Pos	Team	Promotion
1	France	2025–26 Women's FIH Hockey Nations Cup
2	Uruguay	2025–26 Women's FIH Hockey Nations Cup
3	Wales	
4	Poland (H)	
5	Czech Republic	
6	Italy	
7	Malaysia	
8	South Africa	

Source: FIH
(H) Host

=== Awards ===
The awards were announced on 21 June 2025.

Award	Player
Player of the tournament	(Uruguay) Manuela Vilar
Goalkeeper of the tournament	(Poland) Marta Kucharska
Best junior player	(France) Mathilde Duffrène

=== Goalscorers ===
There were 72 goals scored in 20 matches, for an average of 3.6 goals per match.

5 goals

- (Uruguay) Manuela Vilar

4 goals

- (France) Mathilde Duffrène
- (Italy) Lola Brea

3 goals

- (Czech Republic) Linda Nováková
- (France) Yohanna Lhopital
- (France) Eve Verzura
- (Malaysia) Nur Azhar
- (Poland) Sandra Tatarczuk
- (Uruguay) Manuela Quiñones

2 goals

- (France) Inès Lardeur
- (France) Paola Le Nindre
- (France) Pauline Varoqui
- (Italy) Antonella Bruni
- (Italy) Victoria Cabut
- (Italy) Maria Lunghi
- (Italy) Guadalupe Moras
- (Poland) Oliwia Krychniak
- (Wales) Beth Peers
- (Wales) Lily Roberts

1 goal

- (Czech Republic) Natálie Hájková
- (Italy) Federica Carta
- (Italy) Teresa Dalla Vittoria
- (Italy) Ailin Oviedo
- (Malaysia) Dayang Abang
- (Poland) Amelia Katerla
- (Poland) Hanna Wochna
- (South Africa) Quanita Bobbs
- (South Africa) Daniella de Oliveira
- (South Africa) Charné Maddocks
- (South Africa) Ntsopa Mokoena
- (South Africa) Hannah Pearce
- (South Africa) Onthatile Zulu
- (Uruguay) Sol Amadeo
- (Uruguay) Manuela Barrandeguy
- (Uruguay) Kaisuami Dall'Orso
- (Uruguay) Teresa Viana
- (Wales) Anja Atkin
- (Wales) Elizabeth Bingham
- (Wales) Amy Cradden
- (Wales) Millie Holme

Source: FIH

== See also ==
- 2024–25 Men's FIH Hockey Nations Cup 2
- 2024–25 Women's FIH Hockey Nations Cup
