= 2025 Women's EuroHockey Championship =

International field hockey competition

Tournament details
- Host country: Germany
- City: Mönchengladbach
- Dates: 9–17 August
- Teams: 8 (from 1 confederation)
- Venue: Warsteiner HockeyPark

Final positions
- Champions: Netherlands (13th title)
- Runner-up: Germany
- Third place: Spain

Tournament statistics
- Matches played: 20
- Goals scored: 64 (3.2 per match)
- Top scorer: (Netherlands) Yibbi Jansen (6 goals)
- Best player: (Netherlands) Yibbi Jansen
- Best young player: (Belgium) Camille Belis
- Best goalkeeper: (Spain) Clara Pérez

The 2025 Women's EuroHockey Championship was the 17th edition of the Women's EuroHockey Championship, the biennial international women's field hockey championship of Europe organised by the European Hockey Federation.

The tournament was held alongside the men's tournament at the Warsteiner HockeyPark in Mönchengladbach, Germany from 9 to 17 August 2025. It was the third time Mönchengladbach hosted the event.

The Netherlands were the four-time defending champions and won their 13th title with a win over Germany. The winner would qualify for the 2026 Women's FIH Hockey World Cup to be held in Wavre, Belgium and Amstelveen, Netherlands. As the Netherlands won this tournament, Spain qualified.

== Qualification ==
The top six team from the 2023 edition have qualified directly for this edition of the tournament. The last two teams will be the winners of the two sets of EuroHockey Qualifiers taking place in Glasgow, Scotland and Douai, France in August 2024.

=== Qualified teams ===
Dates	Event	Location	Quotas	Qualifiers
18–26 August 2023	2023 EuroHockey Championship	Mönchengladbach, Germany	6	Netherlands; Belgium; Germany; England; Ireland; Spain
22–25 August 2024	EuroHockey Championship Qualifiers	Douai, France	1	France
22–25 August 2024	EuroHockey Championship Qualifiers	Glasgow, Scotland	1	Scotland
Total			8	

== Draw ==
The draw will be held shortly after the EuroHockey Championship Qualifiers events are played.

=== Seeding ===
Pot 1	Pot 2	Pot 3	Pot 4
Netherlands; Belgium	Germany; England	Spain; Ireland	Scotland; France

== Preliminary round ==
The pools were announced on 12 September 2024.

=== Pool A ===
Pos	Team	Pld	W	D	L	GF	GA	GD	Pts	Qualification
1	Netherlands	3	3	0	0	13	1	+12	9	Semi-finals
2	Germany (H)	3	1	1	1	5	6	−1	4	Semi-finals
3	France	3	1	0	2	2	10	−8	3	
4	Ireland	3	0	1	2	0	3	−3	1	

Source: FIH
Rules for classification: 1) points; 2) matches won; 3) goal difference; 4) goals for; 5) head-to-head result; 6) field goals for.
(H) Hosts

9 August 2025
15:30

Netherlands	2–0	Ireland
Burg 9'; Jansen 37'	Report

Umpires:
Laurine Delforge (BEL)
Magali Sergeant (BEL)

9 August 2025
18:00

Germany	4–1	France
Strauss 13'; Schwabe 15', 24'; Micheel 22'	Report	Verzura 43'

Umpires:
Rebecca Edwards (ENG)
Sandra Adell (ESP)

11 August 2025
15:45

Ireland	0–1	France
	Report	Duffrène 49'

Umpires:
Sophie Bockelmann (GER)
Tim Meissner (GER)

11 August 2025
20:30

Germany	1–5	Netherlands
Micheel 19'	Report	Moes 1'; Matla 10'; Sanders 13', 24'; Veen 54'

Umpires:
Rachel Williams (ENG)
Ivona Makar (CRO)

13 August 2025
17:30

Netherlands	6–0	France
Veen 11'; Jansen 16', 34'; Matla 20', 25'; Fokke 44'	Report

Umpires:
Paul Walker (ENG)
Magali Sergeant (BEL)

13 August 2025
20:00

Ireland	0–0	Germany
	Report

Umpires:
Sébastien Michielsen (BEL)
Alex Fedenczuk (SCO)

=== Pool B ===
Pos	Team	Pld	W	D	L	GF	GA	GD	Pts	Qualification
1	Belgium	3	2	1	0	9	2	+7	7	Semi-finals
2	Spain	3	1	2	0	5	4	+1	5	Semi-finals
3	England	3	1	0	2	4	4	0	3	
4	Scotland	3	0	1	2	1	9	−8	1	

Source: FIH
Rules for classification: 1) points; 2) matches won; 3) goal difference; 4) goals for; 5) head-to-head result; 6) field goals for.

10 August 2025
10:15

England	3–0	Scotland
Crackles 12'; Walker 16'; Owsley 52'	Report

Umpires:
Ivona Makar (CRO)
Lorijn de Kraker (NED)

10 August 2025
12:30

Belgium	2–2	Spain
Vanden Borre 26', 51'	Report	Álvarez 19'; Barrios 43'

Umpires:
Marcin Grochal (POL)
Sophie Bockelmann (GER)

11 August 2025
13:30

Spain	1–1	Scotland
L. Jiménez 12'	Report	McEwan 56'

Umpires:
Coen van Bunge (NED)
Shane O'Donell (IRL)

11 August 2025
18:00

England	0–2	Belgium
	Report	Dewaet 13'; Moors 50'

Umpires:
Lorijn de Kraker (NED)
Sandra Adell (ESP)

13 August 2025
10:00

Spain	2–1	England
Molina 10'; L. Jiménez 36'	Report	Howard 12'

Umpires:
Laurine Delforge (BEL)
Alison Keogh (IRL)

13 August 2025
12:15

Belgium	5–0	Scotland
Ballenghien 1', 18'; Rasir 27'; Vanden Borre 31'; Bonami 37'	Report

Umpires:
Ben Göntgen (GER)
Rebecca Edwards (ENG)

== Fifth to eighth place classification ==
=== Pool C ===
The points obtained in the preliminary round against the other team were carried over.

Pos	Team	Pld	W	D	L	GF	GA	GD	Pts
1	England	3	3	0	0	10	2	+8	9
2	Scotland	3	2	0	1	5	5	0	6
3	France	3	1	0	2	2	7	−5	3
4	Ireland	3	0	0	3	3	6	−3	0

Source: FIH
Rules for classification: 1) points; 2) matches won; 3) goal difference; 4) goals for; 5) head-to-head result; 6) field goals for.

15 August 2025
12:30

Ireland	2–3	Scotland
Upton 35'; Mullan 51'	Report	Watson 49'; Costello 52'; McEwan 54'

Umpires:
Rachel Williams (ENG)
Rebecca Edwards (ENG)

15 August 2025
14:45

France	1–5	England
Lhopital 32'	Report	Balsdon 7', 7'; Rayer 19', 53'; Owsley 49'

Umpires:
Sophie Bockelmann (GER)
Sandra Adell (ESP)

17 August 2025
09:30

England	2–1	Ireland
Howard 16'; Bourne 31'	Report	Mullan 23'

Umpires:
Ivona Makar (CRO)
Sandra Adell (ESP)

17 August 2025
11:45

France	0–2	Scotland
	Report	Robertson 34'; Costello 41'

Umpires:
Ben Göntgen (GER)
Sophie Bockelmann (GER)

== First to fourth place classification ==
=== Bracket ===
Semi-finals
15 August
Netherlands	3
Spain	1
15 August
Belgium	1 (2)
Germany (p.s.o.)	1 (3)

Final
17 August
Netherlands	2
Germany	1
Third place
17 August
Spain (p.s.o.)	0 (2)
Belgium	0 (1)

=== Semifinals ===
15 August 2025
17:00

Netherlands	3–1	Spain
Jansen 22', 26', 49'	Report	Álvarez 5'

Umpires:
Marcin Grochal (POL)
Sébastien Michielsen (BEL)

15 August 2025
20:00

Belgium	1–1	Germany
Gerniers 51'	Report	Wanner 3'
Penalties
Englebert (penalty shoot-out scored); Ballenghien (penalty shoot-out missed); Rasir (penalty shoot-out scored); Bonami (penalty shoot-out missed); Marien (penalty shoot-out missed)	2–3	(penalty shoot-out scored) Schwabe; (penalty shoot-out scored) Fleschütz; (penalty shoot-out missed) Strauss; (penalty shoot-out scored) Micheel

Umpires:
Paul Walker (ENG)
Lorijn de Kraker (NED)

=== Third place game ===
17 August 2025
14:30

Spain	0–0	Belgium
	Report
Penalties
Segú (penalty shoot-out missed); P. Jiménez (penalty shoot-out missed); Vidosa (penalty shoot-out scored); L. Jiménez (penalty shoot-out missed); Agulló (penalty shoot-out missed); L. Jiménez (penalty shoot-out missed); P. Jiménez (penalty shoot-out scored)	2–1	(penalty shoot-out missed) Vanden Borre; (penalty shoot-out scored) Ballenghien; (penalty shoot-out missed) Belis; (penalty shoot-out missed) Vanden Borre; (penalty shoot-out missed) Vandermeiren; (penalty shoot-out missed) Rasir; (penalty shoot-out missed) Ballenghien

Umpires:
Rebecca Edwards (ENG)
Lorijn de Kraker (NED)

=== Final ===
17 August 2025
17:00

Netherlands	2–1	Germany
Dicke 5'; Fokke 18'	Report	Nolte 35'

Umpires:
Rachel Williams (ENG)
Magali Sergeant (BEL)

== Statistics and awards ==
=== Final standings ===
Pos	Team	Qualification
1st place, gold medalist(s)	Netherlands (Note: Belgium and the Netherlands are already qualified for the 2026 FIH Hockey World Cup as hosts.)	
2nd place, silver medalist(s)	Germany (Note: Germany is already qualified for the 2026 FIH Hockey World Cup as the highest placed nation of the 2023–24 FIH Pro League.) (H)	
3rd place, bronze medalist(s)	Spain	2026 FIH Hockey World Cup
4	Belgium	
5	England	2026 World Cup Qualifiers
6	Scotland	2026 World Cup Qualifiers
7	France	2026 World Cup Qualifiers
8	Ireland	2026 World Cup Qualifiers

Source: FIH
(H) Host

=== Goalscorers ===
There were 64 goals scored in 20 matches, for an average of 3.2 goals per match.

6 goals

- (Netherlands) Yibbi Jansen

3 goals

- (Belgium) Stéphanie Vanden Borre
- (Netherlands) Frédérique Matla

2 goals

- (Belgium) Ambre Ballenghien
- (England) Grace Balsdon
- (England) Tess Howard
- (England) Lily Owsley
- (England) Ellie Rayer
- (Germany) Lena Micheel
- (Germany) Sophia Schwabe
- (Ireland) Katie Mullan
- (Netherlands) Luna Fokke
- (Netherlands) Pien Sanders
- (Netherlands) Marijn Veen
- (Scotland) Amy Costello
- (Scotland) Heather McEwan
- (Spain) Patricia Álvarez
- (Spain) Lucía Jiménez Vicente

1 goal

- (Belgium) Astrid Bonami
- (Belgium) Louise Dewaet
- (Belgium) Alix Gerniers
- (Belgium) Lisa Moors
- (Belgium) Justine Rasir
- (England) Darcy Bourne
- (England) Fiona Crackles
- (England) Lily Walker
- (France) Mathilde Duffrène
- (France) Yohanna Lhopital
- (France) Eve Verzura
- (Germany) Lisa Nolte
- (Germany) Sara Strauss
- (Germany) Ines Wanner
- (Ireland) Róisín Upton
- (Netherlands) Joosje Burg
- (Netherlands) Pien Dicke
- (Netherlands) Freeke Moes
- (Scotland) Sarah Robertson
- (Scotland) Charlotte Watson
- (Spain) Sara Barrios
- (Spain) Luciana Molina

Source: FIH

=== Awards ===
The following awards were given at the conclusion of the tournament.

Award	Player
Player of the tournament	(Netherlands) Yibbi Jansen
Goalkeeper of the tournament	(Spain) Clara Pérez
Young player of the tournament	(Belgium) Camille Belis

== See also ==
- 2025 Men's EuroHockey Championship
