= Emma Ponthieu =

French field hockey player

Personal information
- Born: 9 March 1996 (age 30) Lille, France
- Height: 170 cm (5 ft 7 in)
- Weight: 55 kg (121 lb)

Sport
- Sport: Field hockey
- Position: Midfield
- Club: Racing
National team
Years	Team	Caps	Goals
2014–2017	France U–21	14	(0)
2015–2026	France	111	(3)
Medal record
Women's field hockey
Representing France
EuroHockey Championship II
Gold medal – first place	2023 Prague
Silver medal – second place	2021 Prague
EuroHockey Championship III
Gold medal – first place	2019 Lipovci
FIH Nations Cup II
Gold medal – first place	2024–25 Wałcz

Emma Ponthieu (born 9 March 1996) is a French field hockey player.

In 2024, she became an Olympian, representing France at the XXXIII Olympic Games in Paris.

== Early life ==
Emma Ponthieu was born on the 9th of March 1996, in Lille, France.

Her father, Jean Louis, and brother, Theophile, have also represented France in international competition.

== Career ==
=== Domestic league ===
Ponthieu currently competes in the ION Hockey League in Belgium, where she represents Racing.

=== Under–21 ===
In 2014, Ponthieu made her debut for the French U–21 team. She was a member of the squad at the EuroHockey Junior Championship in Waterloo.

Throughout her final years in the national junior squad, 2016 and 2017, Ponthieu was the appointed captain of the team. She captained the team at both the 2016 FIH Junior World Cup in Santiago, and the 2017 EuroHockey Junior Championship in Valencia.

=== Senior national team ===
Ponthieu made her senior debut in 2015, earning her first international caps during Round Two of the 2014–15 FIH World League in Montevideo.

Since making her senior debut, Ponthieu has been a regular inclusion in the French national squad. She has medalled with the team at numerous EuroHockey Championships. She won gold at the 2019 EuroHockey Championship III in Lipovci and the 2023 EuroHockey Championship II in Prague, as well as silver at the 2021 EuroHockey Championship II, also in Prague.

Since 2016, Ponthieu has been captain of the national squad.

==== International goals ====
Goal	Date	Location	Opponent	Score	Result	Competition	Ref.
1	22 February 2015	Cancha Celeste, Montevideo, Uruguay	Trinidad and Tobago	6–1	6–1	2014–15 FIH World League Round 2	
2	23 January 2024	SACS Boys' School, Cape Town, South Africa	South Africa	1–1	2–2	Test Match	
