= 2022 Women's FIH Hockey World Cup – European Qualifier =

Field hockey tournament

2021 Women's European Qualifier
Tournament details
- Host country: Italy
- City: Pisa
- Dates: 21–24 October
- Teams: 8 (from 1 confederation)
- Venue: CUS Pisa

Final positions
- Champions: Ireland
- Runner-up: Wales
- Third place: Scotland

Tournament statistics
- Matches played: 12
- Goals scored: 45 (3.75 per match)
- Top scorer(s): (Ireland) Anna O'Flanagan (Russia) Iuliia Sartakova (Scotland) Fiona Burnet (4 goals)

The 2021 Women's European Qualifier was the European qualification tournament for the 2022 Women's FIH Hockey World Cup. The tournament was held at CUS Pisa in Pisa, Italy from 21 to 24 October 2021.

The tournament was originally scheduled to be held in Rome but on 3 September 2021 it was announced the tournament was moved to Pisa because of the better facilities there.

The top five teams from the 2021 EuroHockey Championship already qualified for the 2022 Women's FIH Hockey World Cup and the winner of this tournament joined them.

== Qualification ==
The bottom three teams from the 2021 EuroHockey Championship and the top 5 from the 2021 EuroHockey Championship II participated in the tournament.

Dates	Event	Location	Quotas	Qualifiers
5–13 June 2021	2021 EuroHockey Championship	Amstelveen, Netherlands	3	Ireland; Italy; Scotland
15–21 August 2021	2021 EuroHockey Championship II	Prague, Czech Republic	5	Belarus; France; Poland; Russia; Wales
Total			8	

== Results ==
All times are local (UTC+2).

=== Bracket ===
Quarter-finals
21 October
Ireland	4
France	1
21 October
Russia	1
Belarus	7
21 October
Italy	0
Wales	1
21 October
Scotland	3
Poland	0

Semi-finals
23 October
Ireland	3
Belarus	2
23 October
Wales (p.s.o.)	0 (3)
Scotland	0 (1)

Final
24 October
Ireland	2
Wales	1
Third place
24 October
Belarus	1
Scotland	2

Fifth place bracket

5–8th place semi-finals
22 October
France	2
Russia	3
22 October
Italy	2
Poland	0

Fifth place
24 October
Russia	2 (3)
Italy (p.s.o.)	2 (4)
Seventh place
24 October
France	4
Poland	2

=== Quarter-finals ===
21 October 2021
09:00

Russia	1–7	Belarus
Sartakova 56'	Report	Papkova 3', 52'; Belavusava 21', 39', 49'; Bahushevich 25'; Kasabutskaya 57'

Umpires:
Hannah Harrison (ENG)
Sophie Bockelmann (GER)

21 October 2021
11:30

Ireland	4–1	France
Upton 33'; O'Flanagan 50'; Malseed 54'; N. Carey 55'	Report	Van Bolhuis 54'

Umpires:
Ivona Makar (CRO)
Lisette Baljon (NED)

21 October 2021
14:00

Scotland	3–0	Poland
Burnet 19', 36'; Jamieson 55'	Report

Umpires:
Alison Keogh (IRL)
Ilaria Amorosini (ITA)

21 October 2021
16:30

Italy	0–1	Wales
	Report	Jones 18'

Umpires:
Céline Martin-Schmets (BEL)
Ines El Hajem (FRA)

=== 5–8th place semi-finals ===
22 October 2021
14:00

France	2–3	Russia
Lhopital 31'; Roque 55'	Report	Leonova 19'; Sartakova 30', 31'

Umpires:
Ilaria Amorosini (ITA)
Sophie Bockelmann (GER)

22 October 2021
16:30

Italy	2–0	Poland
Carta 2'; Oviedo 57'	Report

Umpires:
Lisette Baljon (NED)
Ines El Hajem (FRA)

=== Semi-finals ===
23 October 2021
12:00

Ireland	3–2	Belarus
Tice 2'; O'Flanagan 4'; Carey 48'	Report	Bahushevich 5'; Batura 47'

Umpires:
Hannah Harrison (ENG)
Céline Martin-Schmets (BEL)

23 October 2021
14:30

Wales	0–0	Scotland
	Report
Penalties
Richards (penalty shoot-out scored); Jones (penalty shoot-out missed); Webb (penalty shoot-out scored); Robinson (penalty shoot-out scored)	3–1	(penalty shoot-out missed) Watson; (penalty shoot-out missed) Jamieson; (penalty shoot-out scored) Dark; (penalty shoot-out missed) Robertson

Umpires:
Alison Keogh (IRL)
Ivona Makar (CRO)

=== Seventh place game ===
24 October 2021
09:00

France	4–2	Poland
Lhopital 23'; Lahlah 37'; Verrier 51'; Lardeur 54'	Report	Rybacha 21'; Mazur 42'

Umpires:
Ilaria Amorosini (ITA)
Lisette Baljon (NED)

=== Fifth place game ===
24 October 2021
11:30

Russia	2–2	Italy
Sartakova 20'; Ivanova 53'	Report	Carta 35', 36'
Penalties
Sartakova (penalty shoot-out missed); Sadovaia (penalty shoot-out scored); Kolpakova (penalty shoot-out missed); Koroleva (penalty shoot-out scored); Khalimova (penalty shoot-out scored)	3–4	(penalty shoot-out scored) Borgia; (penalty shoot-out scored) Mirabella; (penalty shoot-out scored) Carta; (penalty shoot-out missed) Oviedo; (penalty shoot-out scored) Pastor

Umpires:
Ivona Makar (CRO)
Sophie Bockelmann (GER)

=== Third place game ===
24 October 2021
14:00

Belarus	1–2	Scotland
Shtsin 11'	Report	Burnet 4', 26'

Umpires:
Alison Keogh (IRL)
Ines El Hajem (FRA)

=== Final ===
24 October 2021
16:30

Ireland	2–1	Wales
O'Flanagan 8', 49'	Report	Howell 15'

Umpires:
Hannah Harrison (ENG)
Céline Martin-Schmets (BEL)

== Statistics ==
=== Final standings ===
Rank	Team
1	Ireland
2	Wales
3	Scotland
4	Belarus
5	Italy
6	Russia
7	France
8	Poland

Qualified for the 2022 Women's FIH Hockey World Cup

=== Goalscorers ===
There were 45 goals scored in 12 matches, for an average of 3.75 goals per match.

4 goals

- (Ireland) Anna O'Flanagan
- (Russia) Iuliia Sartakova
- (Scotland) Fiona Burnet

3 goals

- (Belarus) Darya Belavusava
- (Italy) Federica Carta

2 goals

- (Belarus) Sviatlana Bahushevich
- (Belarus) Krestsina Papkova
- (France) Yohanna Lhopital
- (Ireland) Niamh Carey

1 goal

- (Belarus) Ryta Batura
- (Belarus) Ulyana Kasabutskaya
- (Belarus) Natallia Shtsin
- (France) Guusje van Bolhuis
- (France) Mickaela Lahlah
- (France) Inès Lardeur
- (France) Noa Roque
- (France) Gabrielle Verrier
- (Ireland) Zara Malseed
- (Ireland) Elena Tice
- (Ireland) Roisin Upton
- (Italy) Lara Oviedo
- (Poland) Dżesika Mazur
- (Poland) Marlena Rybacha
- (Russia) Tamara Ivanova
- (Russia) Aleksandra Leonova
- (Scotland) Sarah Jamieson
- (Wales) Isabelle Howell
- (Wales) Sarah Jones

Source: FIH

== See also ==
- 2023 Men's FIH Hockey World Cup – European Qualifier
