= Paola Le Nindre =

France field hockey player

Personal information
- Born: 16 June 2006 (age 20) Le Chesnay, France
- Height: 168 cm (5 ft 6 in)
- Weight: 64 kg (141 lb)

Sport
- Sport: Field hockey
- Position: Forward
- Club: Royal Racing Club de Bruxelles
National team
Years	Team	Caps	Goals
2022–	France U–21	5	(2)
2023–	France	43	(15)
Medal record
Women's field hockey
Representing France
EuroHockey Championship II
Gold medal – first place	2023 Prague
FIH Nations Cup II
Gold medal – first place	2024–25 Wałcz

Paola Le Nindre (born 16 June 2006) is a French field hockey player.

== Early life ==
Paola Le Nindre was born and raised in Le Chesnay, a former commune in the Yvelines department in the region of Île-de-France.

== Career ==
=== Under–21 ===
In 2022, Le Nindre debuted for the French U–21 team. She was a member of the squad at the EuroHockey Junior Championship II in Vienna.

=== Senior national team ===
Le Nindre made her senior international debut for France in 2023. Following her debut, she went on to win her first medal with the national team, taking home gold at the EuroHockey Championship II in Prague.

In 2024, Le Nindre became an Olympian. She was named in the French squad for the XXXIII Summer Olympics in Paris. During the competition, in France's opening match against the Netherlands, Le Nindre scored France's second ever goal at an Olympic Games. She was also the youngest of the French squad, at just 18 years of age.

Since the Olympic Games, Le Nindre has continued to represent the national team. She was most recently named in the squad for the 2024–25 FIH Nations Cup II in Wałcz. And played at the 2025 Women’s EuroHockey Championship in Mönchengladbach.

Major International Tournaments

- 2023 EuroHockey Championship II – Prague
- 2024 Olympics Games – Paris
- 2024–25 FIH Nations Cup II – Wałcz
- Women's EuroHockey Championship - Mönchengladbach

== International goals ==
The following is a list of goals scored by Le Nindre at international level.

Goal	Date	Location	Opponent	Score	Result	Competition	Ref.
1	30 July 2023	SK Slavia Prague, Prague, Czech Republic	Lithuania	7–0	8–0	2023 EuroHockey Championship II	
2	31 July 2023	SK Slavia Prague, Prague, Czech Republic	Wales	2–0	3–1	2023 EuroHockey Championship II	
3	2 August 2023	SK Slavia Prague, Prague, Czech Republic	Austria	4–0	5–0	2023 EuroHockey Championship II	
4	2 August 2023	SK Slavia Prague, Prague, Czech Republic	Austria	5–0	5–0	2023 EuroHockey Championship II	
5	22 January 2024	South African College Schools, Newlands, South Africa	South Africa	3–0	4–1	Test Match	
6	4 July 2024	Cambrai Hockey Club, Cambrai, France	South Africa	1–0	4–1	Test Match	
7	4 July 2024	Cambrai Hockey Club, Cambrai, France	South Africa	2–0	4–1	Test Match	
8	27 July 2024	Stade Yves-du-Manoir, Paris, France	Netherlands	2–4	2–6	2024 Olympics Games	
9	22 August 2024	Douai Hockey Club, Douai, France	Luxembourg	4–0	22–0	2025 EuroHockey Qualifier B	
10	22 August 2024	Douai Hockey Club, Douai, France	Luxembourg	8–0	22–0	2025 EuroHockey Qualifier B	
11	22 August 2024	Douai Hockey Club, Douai, France	Luxembourg	10–0	22–0	2025 EuroHockey Qualifier B	
12	22 August 2024	Douai Hockey Club, Douai, France	Luxembourg	11–0	22–0	2025 EuroHockey Qualifier B	
13	22 August 2024	Douai Hockey Club, Douai, France	Luxembourg	14–0	22–0	2025 EuroHockey Qualifier B	
