= Mathilde Duffrène =

France field hockey player

Personal information
- Born: 19 March 2005 (age 21) Valenciennes, France
- Height: 175 cm (5 ft 9 in)
- Weight: 62 kg (137 lb)

Sport
- Sport: Field hockey
- Position: Defence
- Club: Saint-Germain Hockey Club
National team
Years	Team	Caps	Goals
2022–2026	France U–21	9	(7)
2022–	France	56	(16)
Medal record
Women's field hockey
Representing France
EuroHockey U21 Championship II
Silver medal – second place	2022 Vienna
EuroHockey Championship II
Gold medal – first place	2023 Prague
FIH Nations Cup II
Gold medal – first place	2024–25 Wałcz
EuroHockey U21 Championship II
Gold medal – first place	2026 Salon-de-Provence

Mathilde Duffrène (born 19 March 2005) is a field hockey player from France.

== Early life ==
Mathilde Duffrène was born in Valenciennes and raised in Lille, two cities in the Hauts-de-France region of Northern France.

== Career ==
=== Domestic hockey ===
Duffrène competed in the Carlsberg 0.0 Hockey League, the top–level domestic competition in Belgium. In the league, she has been a member of the defensive unit for Racing Club de Bruxelles.

For the 2026-2027 season, she plays for the Saint-Germain-en-Laye Hockey Club.

=== Under–21 ===
In 2022, Duffrène made her international debut at under–21 level. She was a member of the French U–21 team at the EuroHockey U–21 Championship II in Vienna. At the tournament, the French squad won a silver medal, earning promotion to the EuroHockey U–21 Championship.

In her final year at the U-21 level, she competed in the 2026 Women's EuroHockey Junior Championship II EuroHockey in Salon-de-Provence, France, as captain of the French national team. The French squad won the gold medal, and she was named both the tournament's top scorer and best player. Thanks to this victory, the French women's U-21 team qualified for the 2027 Women's Junior World Cup and the 2028 Women's EuroHockey Junior Championship I.

=== Senior national team ===
Duffrène made her senior international debut for France in 2022.

Since her debut, Duffrène has been a constant inclusion in the national team. At the 2023 EuroHockey Championship II in Prague, she won her first medal with the national team, taking home gold.

In 2024, Duffrène became an Olympian. She was named in the French squad for the XXXIII Summer Olympics in Paris.

Since the Olympic Games, Duffrène has continued to represent the national team. She was most recently named in the squad for the 2024–25 FIH Nations Cup II in Wałcz and for the 2025 EuroHockey Championship in Monchengladbach.

In February 2026, she participated in the World Cup qualifying tournament in Santiago, Chile. She scored a goal and was named best young player of the tournament.

Mathilde then participated in the FIH Hockey Women's Nations Cup New Zealand 2025-26 in Auckland, New Zealand, in June 2026. She was voted best player of the France-Uruguay match.

Major International Tournaments

- 2023 EuroHockey Championship II – Prague
- 2024 Olympics Games – Paris
- 2024–25 FIH Nations Cup II – Wałcz
- 2025 EuroHockey Championship – Monchengladbach
- 2026 Women's FIH Hockey World Cup Qualifiers – Santiago
- 2026 Women's FIH Hockey Nation Cup – Auckland

== International goals ==
The following is a list of goals scored by Duffrène at international level.

Goal	Date	Location	Opponent	Score	Result	Competition	Ref.
1	6 December 2023	Lille Métropole Hockey Club, Lille, France	Czech Republic	1–0	2–0	Test Match	
2	6 December 2023	Lille Métropole Hockey Club, Lille, France	Czech Republic	2–0	2–0	Test Match	
3	9 December 2023	Lille Métropole Hockey Club, Lille, France	Czech Republic	1–1	1–1	Test Match	
4	10 December 2023	Lille Métropole Hockey Club, Lille, France	Ukraine	1–0	1–0	Test Match	
5	22 January 2024	South African College Schools, Newlands, South Africa	South Africa	1–0	4–1	Test Match	
6	23 January 2024	South African College Schools, Newlands, South Africa	South Africa	2–2	2–2	Test Match	
7	24 August 2024	Douai Hockey Club, Douai, France	Ukraine	2–0	3–2	2025 EuroHockey Championship Qualifier B	
8	25 August 2024	Douai Hockey Club, Douai, France	Poland	1–0	2–0	2025 EuroHockey Championship Qualifier B	
9	8 June 2025	Club de Lambersart, Lambersart, France	Austria	2–0	4–0	Test Match	
10	16 June 2025	Centralny Ośrodek Sportu, Wałcz, Poland	Czech Republic	2–0	3–0	2024–25 FIH Nations Cup 2	
11	17 June 2025	Centralny Ośrodek Sportu, Wałcz, Poland	Italy	1–0	4–0	2024–25 FIH Nations Cup 2	
12	22 June 2025	Centralny Ośrodek Sportu, Wałcz, Poland	Uruguay	1–1	3–3	2024–25 FIH Nations Cup 2	
13	22 June 2025	Centralny Ośrodek Sportu, Wałcz, Poland	Uruguay	2–1	3–3	2024–25 FIH Nations Cup 2	
14	11 August 2025	Warsteiner HockeyPark SparkassenPark, Monchengladbach, Germany	Ireland	1–0	1–0	2025 EuroHockey Championship	
15	7 March 2026	Centro Deportivo de Hockey Césped, Estadio Nacional, Santiago, Chile	Canada	2–0	3–0	2026 Women's FIH Hockey World Cup Qualifiers	
16	21 June 2026	North Harbour Hockey Stadium, Auckland, New Zealand	Uruguay	3–0	3–0	2026 Women's FIH Hockey Nation Cup	
