= Gabrielle Verrier =

France field hockey player

Personal information
- Born: 18 July 1997 (age 29) Rouen, France
- Height: 166 cm (5 ft 5 in)
- Weight: 63 kg (139 lb)

Sport
- Sport: Field hockey
- Position: Midfield
- Club: Saint Germain
National team
Years	Team	Caps	Goals
2016	France U–21	5	(0)
2020–	France	41	(5)
Medal record
Women's field hockey
Representing France
EuroHockey Championship II
Gold medal – first place	2023 Prague
Silver medal – second place	2021 Prague
FIH Nations Cup II
Gold medal – first place	2024–25 Wałcz

Gabrielle Verrier (born 18 July 1997) is a field hockey player from France.

== Early life ==
Gabrielle Verrier was born and raised in Rouen, a city in the Normandy region of Northern France.

== Career ==
=== Domestic hockey ===
Verrier currently competes in the French National League for Saint Germain.

=== Under–21 ===
In 2016, Verrier was a member of the French U–21 team at the FIH Junior World Cup in Santiago.

=== Senior national team ===
Verrier made her senior international debut for France in 2020.

Since her sebut, Duffrène has been a constant inclusion in the national team. She has won medals at two editions of the EuroHockey Championship II. She won silver at the 2021 edition and gold at the 2023 edition, both of which were held in Prague.

In 2024, Verrier became an Olympian. She was named in the French squad for the XXXIII Summer Olympics in Paris.

Since the Olympic Games, she has continued to represent the national team, and was most recently named in the squad for the 2024–25 FIH Nations Cup II in Wałcz.

Major International Tournaments

- 2021 EuroHockey Championship II – Prague
- 2022 FIH World Cup Qualifier – Pisa
- 2023 EuroHockey Championship II – Prague
- 2024 Olympics Games – Paris
- 2024–25 FIH Nations Cup II – Wałcz

== International goals ==
The following is a list of goals scored by Verrier at international level.

Goal	Date	Location	Opponent	Score	Result	Competition	Ref.
1	18 August 2021	SK Slavia Prague, Prague, Czech Republic	Czech Republic	1–0	1–0	2021 EuroHockey Championship II	
2	24 October 2021	CUS Pisa, Pisa, Italy	Poland	3–2	4–2	2022 FIH World Cup – European Qualifier	
3	22 January 2024	South African College Schools, Newlands, South Africa	South Africa	2–0	4–1	Test Match	
4	22 August 2024	Douai Hockey Club, Douai, France	Luxembourg	9–0	22–0	2025 EuroHockey Championship Qualifier B	
5	24 August 2024	Douai Hockey Club, Douai, France	Ukraine	1–0	3–2	2025 EuroHockey Championship Qualifier B	
