= 2015 Women's EuroHockey Championship II =

Field hockey tournament

Tournament details
- Host country: Czech Republic
- City: Prague
- Dates: 19–27 July
- Teams: 8 (from 1 confederation)
- Venue: Sk Slavia Prague

Final positions
- Champions: Ireland (1st title)
- Runner-up: Czech Republic
- Third place: Belarus

Tournament statistics
- Matches played: 20
- Goals scored: 84 (4.2 per match)
- Top scorer(s): (Azerbaijan) Khatira Aliyeva (Belarus) Krestina Papkova (6 goals)
- Best player: (Ireland) Megan Frazer

The 2015 Women's EuroHockey Championship II was the 6th edition of the Women's EuroHockey Championship II, a field hockey championship for women. It was held from the 19th until the 27th of July 2015 in Prague, Czech Republic.

== Qualified teams ==
Dates	Event	Location	Quotas	Qualifiers
17–24 August 2013	2013 EuroHockey Championship	Boom, Belgium	2	Belarus; Ireland
22–28 July 2013	2013 EuroHockey Championship II	Cambrai, France	4	Austria; Azerbaijan; France; Ukraine
21–26 July 2013	2013 EuroHockey Championship III	Athens, Greece	2	Czech Republic; Wales
Total			8	

== Format ==
The eight teams were split into two groups of four teams. The top two teams advanced to the semifinals to determine the winner in a knockout system. The bottom two teams played in a new group with the teams they did not play against in the group stage. The last two teams were relegated to the EuroHockey Nations Challenge.

== Results ==
All times were local (UTC+2).

=== Preliminary round ===
==== Pool A ====
Pos	Team	Pld	W	D	L	GF	GA	GD	Pts	Qualification
1	Ireland	3	3	0	0	13	1	+12	9	Semi-finals
2	Czech Republic (H)	3	2	0	1	6	7	−1	6	Semi-finals
3	France	3	1	0	2	7	13	−6	3	
4	Ukraine	3	0	0	3	5	10	−5	0	

Source: FIH
Rules for classification: 1) points; 2) goal difference; 3) goals scored; 4) head-to-head result.
(H) Hosts

18 July 2015
13:30

Ireland	7–1	France
Mullan 6'; Carroll 9', 49'; Daly 13'; Frazer 38', 70'; Duke 56'	Report	Berly 7'

Umpires:
Aleisha Neumann (AUS)
Violeta Eismayer (AUT)

18 July 2015
15:45

Ukraine	2–3	Czech Republic
Khilko 15'; Kernoz 67'	Report	Bizová 26'; Haklová 39'; Mejzlíková 59'

Umpires:
Kerri Targett (SCO)
Liudmila Aleinikoviene (BLR)

19 July 2015
18:00

France	2–3	Czech Republic
Billore 3'; Berly 65'	Report	Haklová 21', 51'; Laciná 44'

Umpires:
Kerri Targett (SCO)
Saadat Zakiyeva (AZE)

19 July 2015
20:15

Ukraine	0–3	Ireland
	Report	O'Byrne 13'; Carroll 38'; Brown 70+'

Umpires:
Violeta Eismayer (AUT)
Liudmila Aleinikoviene (BLR)

21 July 2015
15:30

France	4–3	Ukraine
Perrocheau 9'; Billore 16', 41'; Rogeau 21'	Report	Vorushylo 6'; Khilko 32'; Kaliuzhna 64'

Umpires:
Violeta Eismayer (AUT)
Kerri Targett (SCO)

21 July 2015
17:45

Ireland	3–0	Czech Republic
Brown 4'; O'Byrne 31'; Beatty 55'	Report

Umpires:
Saadat Zakiyeva (AZE)
Liudmila Aleinikoviene (BLR)

==== Pool B ====
Pos	Team	Pld	W	D	L	GF	GA	GD	Pts	Qualification
1	Azerbaijan	3	2	1	0	9	6	+3	7	Semi-finals
2	Belarus	3	1	2	0	11	6	+5	5	Semi-finals
3	Wales	3	1	1	1	5	5	0	4	
4	Austria	3	0	0	3	2	10	−8	0	

Source: FIH
Rules for classification: 1) points; 2) goal difference; 3) goals scored; 4) head-to-head result.

18 July 2015
09:00

Azerbaijan	3–1	Austria
Aliyeva 5', 31'; Tsyganska 43'	Report	Tarnozci 66'

Umpires:
Tatyana Kaltypan (UKR)
Alison Keogh (IRE)

18 July 2015
11:15

Belarus	2–2	Wales
Bahushevich 28'; Papkova 69'	Report	Daley 8'; Wilkinson 39'

Umpires:
Helena Babicka (CZE)
Karine Alves (FRA)

19 July 2015
13:30

Belarus	4–4	Azerbaijan
Batura 10'; Papkova 31', 57'; Syrayezhka 42'	Report	Aliyeva 6'; Tsyganska 28'; Mailova 40'; Druzhinina 47'

Umpires:
Aleisha Neumann (AUS)
Karine Alves (FRA)

19 July 2015
15:45

Austria	1–2	Wales
Dvorak 23'	Report	Clayton 49'; Wilkinson 70'

Umpires:
Tatyana Kaltypan (UKR)
Helena Babicka (CZE)

21 July 2015
11:00

Azerbaijan	2–1	Wales
Aliyeva 15'; Tsyganska 67'	Report	Wilkinson 67'

Umpires:
Karine Alves (FRA)
Alison Keogh (IRE)

21 July 2015
13:15

Austria	0–5	Belarus
	Report	Bahushevich 3', 64'; Papkova 24'; Halinouskaya 51'; Kurhanskaya 70+'

Umpires:
Helena Babicka (CZE)
Aleisha Neumann (AUS)

=== Fifth to eighth place classification ===
==== Pool C ====
The points obtained in the preliminary round against the other team are taken over.

Pos	Team	Pld	W	D	L	GF	GA	GD	Pts	Relegation
1	Wales	3	2	1	0	4	1	+3	7	
2	France	3	1	1	1	4	6	−2	4	
3	Austria	3	1	0	2	5	4	+1	3	
4	Ukraine	3	1	0	2	5	7	−2	3	Relegated to EuroHockey Championship III

Source: FIH
Rules for classification: 1) points; 2) goal difference; 3) goals scored; 4) head-to-head result.

23 July 2015
11:00

Ukraine	2–1	Austria
Kernoz 6'; Derkach 60'	Report	Keil 43'

Umpires:
Aleisha Neumann (AUS)
Keri Targett (AUS)

23 July 2015
13:15

France	0–0	Wales
	Report

Umpires:
Helena Babicka (CZE)
Saadat Zakiyeva (AZE)

25 July 2015
08:00

France	0–3	Austria
	Report	Zerbs 31'; Keil 45'; Stöckl

Umpires:
Alison Keogh (IRE)
Liudmila Aleinikoviene (BLR)

25 July 2015
10:15

Wales	2–0	Ukraine
Jones 10', 60'	Report

Umpires:
Violeta Eismayer (AUT)
Saadat Zakiyeva (AZE)

=== First to fourth place classification ===
Crossover
1 December 2016
Azerbaijan	1
Czech Republic	2
1 December 2016
Ireland	4
Belarus	0

Ninth Place
3 December 2016
Czech Republic	0
Ireland	5
Eleventh Place
3 December 2016
Azerbaijan	2
Belarus	4

==== Semifinals ====
23 July 2015
15:30

Ireland	4–0	Belarus
Carroll 8'; Frazer 22'; McCay 28'; Brown 64'	Report

Umpires:
Violeta Eismayer (AUT)
Tatyana Kaltypan (UKR)

23 July 2015
17:45

Azerbaijan	1–2	Czech Republic
Mammadova 49'	Report	Kolářová 48'; Decsoyová 61'

Umpires:
Alison Keogh (IRE)
Karine Alves (FRA)

==== Third and fourth place ====
25 July 2015
12:45

Azerbaijan	2–4	Belarus
Aliyeva 20', 58'	Report	Papkova 9', 24'; Lupach 44'; Bahushevich 66'

Umpires:
Kerri Targett (SCO)
Tatyana Kaltypan (UKR)

==== Final ====
25 July 2015
15:15

Czech Republic	0–5	Ireland
	Report	Mullan 8'; Frazer 32'; Brown 38'; Carroll 43'; Beatty 54'

Umpires:
Aleisha Neumann (AUS)
Karine Alves (FRA)

== Statistics ==
=== Final standings ===
Pos	Team	Pld	W	D	L	GF	GA	GD	Pts	Final Standings
1st place, gold medalist(s)	Ireland	5	5	0	0	22	1	+21	15	Promoted
2nd place, silver medalist(s)	Czech Republic	5	3	0	2	8	13	−5	9	Promoted
3rd place, bronze medalist(s)	Belarus	5	2	2	1	15	12	+3	8	
4	Azerbaijan	6	2	1	3	12	12	0	7	
5	Wales	5	2	2	1	7	5	+2	8	
6	France	5	1	1	3	7	16	−9	4	
7	Austria	5	1	0	4	6	12	−6	3	
8	Ukraine	5	1	0	4	7	13	−6	3	Relegated

Source: FIH

=== Awards ===
Top Goalscorer(s)	Player of the Tournament	Goalkeeper of the Tournament
(Azerbaijan) Khatira Aliyeva (Belarus) Krestina Papkova	(Ireland) Megan Frazer	(Czech Republic) Barbora Čecháková

== See also ==
- 2015 Men's EuroHockey Championship II
- 2015 Women's EuroHockey Championship III
- 2015 Women's EuroHockey Nations Championship
