= France national field hockey team =

France national field hockey team may refer to:

- France men's national field hockey team
- France women's national field hockey team
