= Tessa-Margot Schubert =

French field hockey player

Personal information
- Born: 9 June 1996 (age 30) Essen, Germany
- Height: 158 cm (5 ft 2 in)
- Weight: 59 kg (130 lb)

Sport
- Sport: Field hockey
- Position: Forward
- Club: Düsseldorfer HC
National team
Years	Team	Caps	Goals
2015–2017	Germany U–21	13	(3)
2021–	France	45	(2)
Medal record
Women's field hockey
Representing France
EuroHockey Championship II
Gold medal – first place	2023 Prague
Silver medal – second place	2021 Prague
FIH Nations Cup II
Gold medal – first place	2024–25 Wałcz

Tessa-Margot Schubert (born 9 June 1996) is a German-born French indoor and field hockey player.

== Early life ==
Tessa-Margot Schubert was born on 9 June 1996 in Essen, Germany.

== Field hockey ==
=== Under–21 ===
Throughout her junior career, Schubert represented the German U–21 team. During this time, she appeared in numerous test matches, and competed at the 2017 EuroHockey Junior Championship in Valencia, where the team finished fourth.

=== Senior national team ===
Having dual citizenship, Schubert transitioned into the French national squad in 2021. She made her senior international debut that year. Since debuting with France, Schubert has won medals with the national team at two editions of the EuroHockey Championship II. The first was silver in 2021, followed by gold in 2023.

In 2024, Schubert became an Olympian. She was named in the French squad for the XXXIII Summer Olympics in Paris.

Since the Olympic Games, Schubert has continued to represent the national team. She was most recently named in the squad for the inaugural 2024–25 FIH Nations Cup II in Wałcz.

Major International Tournaments

- 2021 EuroHockey Championship II – Prague
- 2023 EuroHockey Championship II – Prague
- 2024 Olympics Games – Paris
- 2024–25 FIH Nations Cup II – Wałcz

== International goals ==
The following is a list of goals scored by Schubert at international level.

Goal	Date	Location	Opponent	Score	Result	Competition	Ref.
1	5 August 2023	SK Slavia Prague, Prague, Czech Republic	Czech Republic	2–0	2–0	2023 EuroHockey Championship II	
2	28 January 2024	South African College Schools, Newlands, South Africa	South Africa	4–1	4–1	Test Match	

== Indoor hockey ==
In addition to field hockey, Schubert has also played indoor hockey at international level. In 2016 she was a member of the German Indoor squad at the EuroHockey Indoor Championship in Minsk.
