= Manuela Quiñones =

Uruguayan field hockey player

Personal information
- Full name: Manuela Quiñones Olave
- Born: 2 April 2001 (age 25) Uruguay
- Height: 164 cm (5 ft 5 in)
- Weight: 63 kg (139 lb)

Sport
- Sport: Field hockey
- Position: Forward
National team
Years	Team	Caps	Goals
2021–2022	Uruguay U–21	10	(0)
2023–	Uruguay	15	(5)
Medal record
Women's field hockey
Representing Uruguay
Pan American Cup
Bronze medal – third place	2025 Montevideo	Team
South American Games
Bronze medal – third place	2026 Santa Fe	Team
Pan American Junior Championship
Silver medal – second place	2021 Santiago	Team

Manuela Quiñones Olave (born 2 April 2001) is a field hockey player from Uruguay.

== Field hockey ==
=== Under–18 ===
In 2018, Quiñones made her international debut for Uruguay at under–18 level. She represented the national team at the Youth Olympic Games in Buenos Aires. At the tournament, she helped Uruguay to a ninth place finish.

=== Under–21 ===
From 2021 to 2022, Quiñones was a member of the Uruguay U–21 squad. She was a member of the history making team that won silver at the 2021 Pan American Junior Championship in Santiago. Their historic finish also meant the side gained qualification to the FIH Junior World Cup for the first time.

The following year in 2022, Quiñones went on to represent the national under–21 team at the 2022 FIH Junior World Cup in Potchefstroom.

=== Las Cimmaronas ===
Quiñones received her first call-up to Las Cimmaronas in 2023. She was named in the national squad for a Three–Nations Tournament in Montevideo. She earner her first senior international cap during a match against Wales. Later that year she was named in the squad for the XIX Pan American Games in Santiago.

In 2025, Quiñones won her first medal with the senior national team at a major tournament. She won silver at the 2024–25 FIH Nations Cup II in Wałcz. She was also named in the squad for the 2025 Pan American Cup in Montevideo.

== International goals ==
The following is a list of goals scored by Quiñones at international level.

Goal	Date	Location	Opponent	Score	Result	Competition	Ref.
1	19 June 2025	Centralny Ośrodek Sportu, Wałcz, Poland	Malaysia	1–0	4–2	2024–25 FIH Nations Cup II	
2	19 June 2025	Centralny Ośrodek Sportu, Wałcz, Poland	Malaysia	4–2	4–2	2024–25 FIH Nations Cup II	
3	22 June 2025	Centralny Ośrodek Sportu, Wałcz, Poland	France	1–0	3–3 (1–3)	2024–25 FIH Nations Cup II	
4	26 July 2025	Cancha Celeste, Montevideo, Uruguay	Paraguay	1–0	8–0	2025 Pan American Cup	
5	26 July 2025	Cancha Celeste, Montevideo, Uruguay	Paraguay	2–0	8–0	2025 Pan American Cup	
