= Eve Verzura =

Franch field hockey player

Personal information
- Full name: Eve Sandrine Hélène Verzura
- Born: 2 April 2002 (age 24) Lille, France
- Height: 167 cm (5 ft 6 in)
- Weight: 59 kg (130 lb)

Sport
- Sport: Field hockey
- Position: Midfield
- Club: Iris Hockey Lambersart
National team
Years	Team	Caps	Goals
2018–	France	54	(12)
Medal record
Women's field hockey
Representing France
EuroHockey Championship II
Gold medal – first place	2023 Prague
Silver medal – second place	2021 Prague
EuroHockey Championship III
Gold medal – first place	2019 Lipovci
FIH Nations Cup II
Gold medal – first place	2024–25 Wałcz

Eve Sandrine Hélène Verzura (born 2 April 2002) is a French field hockey player.

== Early life ==
Eve Verzura was born on 2 April 2002 in Lille.

== Career ==
=== Domestic hockey ===
Verzura currently competes in the French National League for Iris Hockey Lambersart.

In the past she has also competed in the Women's Belgian Hockey League, the top–level domestic competition in Belgium. During her time in the league, she was a member of the attacking unit for Royal Léopold.

=== Under–21 ===
In 2022, Duffrène made her international debut at under–21 level. She was a member of the French U–21 team at the EuroHockey U–21 Championship II in Vienna. At the tournament, the French squad won a silver medal, earning promotion to the EuroHockey U–21 Championship.

=== Senior national team ===
Verzura made her senior international debut for France in 2018. She earned her first senior cap during a test match against Poland in Wałcz.

Since her debut, Verzura has been a constant inclusion in the national team and has medalled with the squad three times. She has won medals at two editions of the EuroHockey Championship II, taking home gold in 2023 and silver in 2021, both in Prague. She also won gold at the 2019 EuroHockey Championship III in Lipovci.

In 2024, Verzura became an Olympian. She was named in the French squad for the 2024 Summer Olympics in Paris.

Since the Olympic Games, Verzura has continued to represent the national team. She was most recently named in the squad for the 2024–25 FIH Nations Cup II in Wałcz.

Major International Tournaments

- 2021 EuroHockey Championship III – Lipovci
- 2021 EuroHockey Championship II – Prague
- 2022 FIH World Cup Qualifier – Pisa
- 2023 EuroHockey Championship II – Prague
- 2024 Olympics Games – Paris
- 2024–25 FIH Nations Cup II – Wałcz
