= Yohanna Lhopital =

English field hockey player

Personal information
- Born: 18 September 1999 (age 27) Lyon, France
- Height: 163 cm (5 ft 4 in)
- Weight: 50 kg (110 lb)

Sport
- Sport: Field hockey
- Position: Midfield / Forward
- Club: (France) Saint-Germain-en-Laye HC
Youth career
- Years: Team
- 2004–2015: (France) FC Lyon Hockey
Senior career
Years	Team	Caps	Goals
2013–2018	(France) FC Lyon Hockey	-	-
2018–2020	(France) Saint-Germain-en-Laye HC	-	-
2020–2024	(Belgium) Waterloo Ducks HC	-	-
2024–	(France) Saint-Germain-en-Laye HC	-	-
National team
Years	Team	Caps	Goals
2013–2016	France U–18	10	(5)
2016–2019	France U–21	15	(3)
2016–	France	92	(36)
Medal record
Women's field hockey
Representing France
FIH Nations Cup II
Gold medal – first place	2024–25 Wałcz
EuroHockey Championship II
Gold medal – first place	2023 Prague
Silver medal – second place	2021 Prague
EuroHockey Championship III
Gold medal – first place	2019 Lipovci
EuroHockey Youth Championship II
Silver medal – second place	2016 Glasgow

Yohanna Lhopital (born 18 September 1999) is a French field hockey player.

== Early life ==
Yohanna Lhopital was born on 18 September 1999 in Lyon.

== Career ==
=== Domestic league ===
Lhopital began hockey in Lyon at the age of 5, she started with the local team FC Lyon Hockey (club located in Caluire-et-Cuire, 200 meters away from her grandmother home) and won several regional and national junior titles. Lhopital also won the second national French division (Nationale 1) in 2015, title that allowed the FC Lyon Hockey to return in Elite.

Lhopital has competed for 4 years in the ION Hockey League in Belgium. She represented the Waterloo Ducks and finished with a lot of experience in Belgium with a bronze medal.

After the 2024 Summer Olympics, Lhopital decided to return in France and signed in his former club Saint-Germain-en-Laye HC. During the first year, she won the championship and finished top scorer.

Lhopital also used to play indoor hockey. She won the Elite championship in 2018 with Douai Hockey Club and the Nationale 1 championship in 2019 with ASVEL (Association sportive de Villeurbanne Éveil lyonnais).

=== Under-18 ===
In 2013, Lhopital discovered the French national team with practical trainings for 2013 Girls' EuroHockey Youth Championships. Thus began her international career at the age of 13 but she as to wait 2015, and 2015 Girls' EuroHockey Youth Championships in Santander, to honor her first selection. Unfortunately, they finished at the 7th place and was relegated EuroHockey Youth Championship II. Despite this it allowed the French junior team and Lhopital to win the following year the silver medal at the 2016 Girls' EuroHockey Youth Championships II in Glasgow. Lhopital finished top scorer of this tournament with 5 goals in as many games.

=== Under-21 ===
In 2016, Lhopital made her debut for the French U-21 team. She was the youngest player in the squad at the FIH Junior World Cup in Santiago.

Following her debut, Lhopital also represented the junior national team at two EuroHockey Junior Championships. She was a member of the French squad at the 2017 and 2019 editions of the tournament, both being held in Valencia.

=== Senior national team ===
Lhopital also made her senior debut in 2016, earning her first international caps during Round One of the 2016–17 FIH World League in Douai.

Since making her senior debut, Lhopital has been a regular inclusion in the French national squad. She has medalled with the team at numerous EuroHockey Championships. She won gold at the 2019 EuroHockey Championship III in Lipovci, the 2023 EuroHockey Championship II in Prague and the 2025 FIH Nations Cup II in Walcz, as well as silver at the 2021 EuroHockey Championship II, also in Prague.

Lhopital was part of the French squad for the XXXIII Olympic Games. She scored the first goal by a French women's hockey team at the Olympic Games. This goal was scored during the first game of the competition, against the Netherlands (future winner of the tournament). Lhopital also scored a second goal during this competition, against Germany.

The French team will conclude this summer with a gold medal at the Douai EuroHockey Championship Qualifier B, a medal qualifying them for the EuroHockey Championship A which will take place in 2025 in Mönchengladbach.

==== International goals ====
Goal	Date	Location	Opponent	Score	Result	Competition	Ref.
1	14 September 2016	Douai Hockey Club, Douai, France	Switzerland	4–1	4–1	2016–17 FIH World League Round 1	
2	9 August 2017	Sport Wales National Centre, Cardiff, Wales	Russia	1–4	1–4	2017 EuroHockey Championship II	
3	7 July 2018	Wattignies Hockey Club, Wattignies, France	Austria	3–0	3–0	2018–19 FIH Series Open	
4	31 May 2019	Sport Wales National Centre, Cardiff, Wales	Wales	1–1	1–2	Test Match	
5	9 June 2019	Banbridge Hockey Club, Banbridge, Ireland	Ukraine	2–3	2–3	2018–19 FIH Series Finals	
6	28 July 2019	Hockey Lipovci, Lipovci, Slovenia	Slovenia	2–0	16–0	2019 EuroHockey Championship III	
7	3 August 2019	Hockey Lipovci, Lipovci, Slovenia	Lithuania	3–2	4–3	2019 EuroHockey Championship III	
8	22 January 2020	Stade de la Fontone, Antibes, France	Wales	2–0	2–2	Test Match	
9	3 August 2021	Centralny Ośrodek Sportu, Wałcz, Poland	Poland	2–1	3–1	Test Match	
10	5 August 2021	Centralny Ośrodek Sportu, Wałcz, Poland	Poland	1–0	3–1	Test Match	
11	5 August 2021	Centralny Ośrodek Sportu, Wałcz, Poland	Poland	3–1	3–1	Test Match	
12	15 August 2021	HC Slavia Praha, Prague, Czech Republic	Belarus	2–1	2–1	2021 EuroHockey Championship II	
13	22 October 2021	CUS Pisa, Pisa, Italy	Russia	1–2	2–3	2022 FIH World Cup – European Qualifier	
14	24 October 2021	CUS Pisa, Pisa, Italy	Poland	1–1	4–2	2022 FIH World Cup – European Qualifier	
15	24 August 2022	Hockey Club Dunkerque Malo, Dunkirk, France	Switzerland	1–0	2–0	2023 EuroHockey Championship Qualifiers	
16	27 August 2022	Hockey Club Dunkerque Malo, Dunkirk, France	Austria	1–0	4–0	2023 EuroHockey Championship Qualifiers	
17	20 July 2023	Salon Hockey Club, Salon-de-Provence, France	Scotland	4–1	4–1	Test Match	
18	22 July 2023	Salon Hockey Club, Salon-de-Provence, France	Scotland	1–1	3–2	Test Match	
19	2 August 2023	HC Slavia Praha, Prague, Czech Republic	Austria	1–0	5–0	2023 EuroHockey Championship II	
20	2 August 2023	HC Slavia Praha, Prague, Czech Republic	Austria	2–0	5–0	2023 EuroHockey Championship II	
21	28 January 2024	South African College Schools, Cape Town, South Africa	South Africa	2–1	4–1	Test Match	
22	27 Juillet 2024	Stade Yves du Manoir, Colombes, France	Netherlands	1–3	2–6	Olympic Games Paris 2024	
23	31 juillet 2024	Stade Yves du Manoir, Colombes, France	Germany	1–3	1–5	Olympic Games Paris 2024	
24	22 August 2024	Douai Hockey Club, Douai, France	Luxembourg	2–0	22–0	EuroHockey Championship Qualifier B Women 2024	
25	22 August 2024	Douai Hockey Club, Douai, France	Luxembourg	3–0	22–0	EuroHockey Championship Qualifier B Women 2024	
26	22 August 2024	Douai Hockey Club, Douai, France	Luxembourg	17–0	22–0	EuroHockey Championship Qualifier B Women 2024	
27	22 August 2024	Douai Hockey Club, Douai, France	Luxembourg	20–0	22–0	EuroHockey Championship Qualifier B Women 2024	
28	8 June 2025	Iris Hockey Lambersart, Lambersart, France	Austria	1–0	4–0	Test Match	
29	8 June 2025	Iris Hockey Lambersart, Lambersart, France	Austria	3–0	4–0	Test Match	
30	8 June 2025	Iris Hockey Lambersart, Lambersart, France	Austria	4–0	4–0	Test Match	
31	19 June 2025	Centralny Ośrodek Sportu, Wałcz, Poland	Wales	2–0	2–1	2024–25 Women's FIH Hockey Nations Cup 2	
32	21 June 2025	Centralny Ośrodek Sportu, Wałcz, Poland	Poland	1–0	4–1	2024–25 Women's FIH Hockey Nations Cup 2	
33	22 June 2025	Centralny Ośrodek Sportu, Wałcz, Poland	Uruguay	3–2	3–3 (3-1 SO)	2024–25 Women's FIH Hockey Nations Cup 2	
34	27 July 2025	Peffermill, University of Edinburgh, Edinburgh, Scotland	Scotland	3–0	4–3	Test Match	
35	27 July 2025	Peffermill, University of Edinburgh, Edinburgh, Scotland	Scotland	4–3	4–3	Test Match	
36	15 August 2025	SparkassenPark, Mönchengladbach, Germany	England	1–3	1–5	2025 Women's EuroHockey Championship	
