= Clara Pérez =

Spanish field hockey player (born 2001)

Personal information
- Full name: Clara Pérez Calderón
- Born: 26 July 2001 (age 25) Terrassa

Sport
- Sport: Field hockey
Medal record
EuroHockey Championship
Bronze medal – third place	2025 Mönchengladbach

Clara Pérez Calderón (Note: In this Spanish name, the first or paternal surname is Pérez and the second or maternal family name is Calderón.) (born 26 July 2001) is a Spanish field hockey player. She represented Spain at the 2024 Summer Olympics.
