= Leah Wilkinson =

Welsh field hockey player

Personal information
- Born: 3 December 1986 (age 39) Burton-on-Trent, England
- Height: 169 cm (5 ft 7 in)
- Weight: 63 kg (9 st 13 lb)
- Spouse: Holly Payne (m. 2024)

Sport
- Sport: Field hockey
- Position: Defender
- Club: Surbiton
National team
Years	Team	Caps	Goals
2004–	Wales	172	(23)
2019–	Great Britain	21	(0)
Medal record
Representing Great Britain
Olympic Games
Bronze medal – third place	2020 Tokyo	Team
- Updated on 9 January 2022

Leah Julia Wilkinson (born 3 December 1986) is a Welsh international field hockey player who plays as a defender for Wales and Great Britain.

== Biography ==
She was born in Burton-on-Trent, England, and plays club hockey in the Women's England Hockey League Premier Division for Surbiton.

Wilkinson has also played for Holcombe and Reading.

She represented Wales at the 2010 Commonwealth Games, 2014 Commonwealth Games and 2018 Commonwealth Games.

In 2004, she made her international debut for Wales against Ireland. She took over the captaincy of her country in 2018 and on 1 June 2019 she became not only the most capped hockey player, but most capped Welsh sportsperson.

Wilkinson made her debut for Great Britain on 1 October 2019 v India and won a bronze medal at the 2020 Summer Olympics in Tokyo.

In 2024, she married fellow player Holly Payne and took up a coaching post at Old Georgians Hockey Club.
