= France women's national field hockey team =

France
- Association: French Hockey Federation (Fédération Française de Hockey)
- Confederation: EHF (Europe)
- Head Coach: Gaël Foulard
- Assistant coach(es): Nicolas Jaquet
- Manager: Carole Thibaut-Teffri
- Captain: Emma Ponthieu
Home	Away

FIH ranking
- Current: 16 ▲1 (11 June 2026)

Olympic Games
- Appearances: 1 (first in 2024)
- Best result: 12th (2024)

World Cup
- Appearances: 3 (first in 1974)
- Best result: 6th (1976)

EuroHockey Championship
- Appearances: 9 (first in 1984)
- Best result: 7th (1995, 2025)

France's women's national field hockey team represents France in women's international field hockey and is controlled by the French Hockey Federation.

== Tournament record ==
=== Summer Olympics ===
- 2024 – 12th place

=== World Cup ===
- 1974 – 7th place
- 1976 – 6th place
- 1981 – 9th place

=== European championships ===
==== EuroHockey Championship ====
- 1984 – 10th place
- 1987 – 10th place
- 1991 – 10th place
- 1995 – 7th place
- 1999 – 10th place
- 2003 – 8th place
- 2005 – 8th place
- 2025 – 7th place
- 2027 – Qualified

==== EuroHockey Championship II ====
- 2007 – 5th place
- 2009 – 4th place
- 2011 – 4th place
- 2013 – 4th place
- 2015 – 6th place
- 2017 – 8th place
- 2021 – (silver)
- 2023 – (gold)

==== EuroHockey Championship III ====
- 2019 – (gold)

=== Hockey World League ===
- 2012–13 – Round 1
- 2014–15 – 20th place
- 2016–17 – Round 1

=== FIH Hockey Nations Cup ===
- 2025–26 – 7th place

=== FIH Hockey Nations Cup 2 ===
- 2024–25 – (gold)

=== FIH Hockey Series ===
- 2018–19 – Second round

== Current squad ==
The squad for the 2025 Women's EuroHockey Championship.

Head coach: Gaël Foulard

1. Violette Ferront (GK)
2. Noémie Mekki
3. Catherine Clot
4. Emma Ponthieu (C)
5. Mickaela Lahlah
6. Marie-Alice Pelletier
7. Paola Le Nindre
8. Yohanna Lhopital
14. Gabrielle Verrier
15. Emma van der Zanden
19. Mathilde Duffrène
21. Pauline Varoqui
22. Ève Verzura
23. Inès Lardeur
24. Lucie Ehrmann (GK)
25. Albane Garot
27. Delfina Gaspari
28. Tessa-Margot Schubert

== Results ==
=== 2025 Fixtures and Results ===
2025 Statistics
Pld	W	D	L	GF	GA	GD	Pts
10	5	1	4	19	22	-3	16

==== FIH Nations Cup 2 ====
16 June 2025 Pool B	France	3–0	Czechia	Wałcz, Poland
14:00	Le Nindre 34', 45'; Duffrène 40'	Report

17 June 2025 Pool B	France	4–0	Italy	Wałcz, Poland
14:00	Duffrène 6'; Lardeur 34'; Varoqui 40', 56'	Report

19 June 2025 Pool B	Wales	1–2	France	Wałcz, Poland
14:00	Roberts 40'	Report	Lardeur 22'; Lhopital 33'

21 June 2025 SF	France	4–1	Poland	Wałcz, Poland
18:45	Lhopital 4'; Verzura 26', 46', 57'	Report	Katerla 56'

22 June 2025 Final	Uruguay	3–3 (1–3 p)	France	Wałcz, Poland
18:45	Quiñones 11'; Vilar 56'; Amadeo 59'	Report	Duffrène 15', 44'; Lhopital 57'
	Penalties
	Curutchague (penalty shoot-out missed); Viana (penalty shoot-out scored); Quiñones (penalty shoot-out missed); Civetta (penalty shoot-out missed)		(penalty shoot-out scored) Schubert; (penalty shoot-out scored) Verzura; (penalty shoot-out scored) Verzura

==== EuroHockey Championship ====
9 August 2025 Pool A	Germany	4–1	France	Mönchengladbach, Germany
18:00	Strauss 13'; Schwabe 15', 24'; Micheel 22'	Report	Verzura 43'	Stadium: Warsteiner HockeyPark

11 August 2025 Pool A	Ireland	0–1	France	Mönchengladbach, Germany
15:45		Report	Duffrène 49'	Stadium: Warsteiner HockeyPark

13 August 2025 Pool A	Netherlands	6–0	France	Mönchengladbach, Germany
17:30	Veen 11'; Jansen 16', 34'; Matla 20', 25'; Fokke 44'	Report		Stadium: Warsteiner HockeyPark

15 August 2025 Classification round	France	1–5	England	Mönchengladbach, Germany
14:45	Lhopital 32'	Report	Balsdon 7', 7'; Rayer 19', 53'; Owsley 49'	Stadium: Warsteiner HockeyPark

17 August 2025 Classification round	France	0–2	Scotland	Mönchengladbach, Germany
11:45		Report	Robertson 34'; Costello 41'	Stadium: Warsteiner HockeyPark

=== 2026 Fixtures and Results ===
2026 Statistics
Pld	W	D	L	GF	GA	GD	Pts
10	4	2	4	14	12	+2	14

==== 2026 Women's FIH Hockey World Cup Qualifiers ====
2 March 2026 Pool A	Australia	4–0	France	Santiago, Chile
17:30	Flynn 8'; G. Stewart 19'; Kershaw 23'; Arnott 28'	Report		Stadium: Estadio Nacional del Hockey Césped Claudia Schüler

4 March 2026 Pool A	France	2–1	Switzerland	Santiago, Chile
13:30	Lahlah 12'; Le Nindre 37'	Report	Weber 16'	Stadium: Estadio Nacional del Hockey Césped Claudia Schüler

5 March 2026 Pool A	France	0–1	Chile	Santiago, Chile
19:45		Report	Salas 8'	Stadium: Estadio Nacional del Hockey Césped Claudia Schüler

7 March 2026 5/8 Classification	France	3–0	Canada	Santiago, Chile
09:00	Van der Zanden 34'; Duffrene 37'; Varoqui 51'	Report		Stadium: Estadio Nacional del Hockey Césped Claudia Schüler

8 March 2026 5/6 Classification	France	3–0	Malaysia	Santiago, Chile
11:15	Van der Zanden 1', 57'; Proux 37'	Report		Stadium: Estadio Nacional del Hockey Césped Claudia Schüler

==== 2026 FIH Nations Cup ====
15 June 2026 Pool B	Chile	2–0	France	Auckland, New Zealand
15:45	Urroz 11'; Arrieta 57'	Report		Stadium: National Hockey Centre

16 June 2026 Pool B	South Korea	1–1	France	Auckland, New Zealand
15:45	Y. Lee 48'	Report	Zanden 43'	Stadium: National Hockey Centre

18 June 2026 Pool B	New Zealand	2–1	France	Auckland, New Zealand
18:00	K. Cotter 26'; Blake 57'	Report	Garot 33'	Stadium: National Hockey Centre

20 June 2026 5/8 Classification	Japan	1–1 (3–1 p)	France	Auckland, New Zealand
11:00	Murayama 26'	Report	Blanquart 10'	Stadium: National Hockey Centre
	Penalties
	Hasegawa (penalty shoot-out missed); Kobayakawa (penalty shoot-out scored); Nakagomi (penalty shoot-out scored); Shimada (penalty shoot-out scored)		(penalty shoot-out missed) Schubert; (penalty shoot-out missed) Verzura; (penalty shoot-out scored) Garot; (penalty shoot-out missed) Lhopital

21 June 2026 7/8 Classification	France	3–0	Uruguay	Auckland, New Zealand
11:00	Zanden 2'; Rimbert 43'; Duffrène 55'	Report		Stadium: North Harbour Hockey Stadium

== See also ==
- France men's national field hockey team
