= Alice Lesgourgues =

French field hockey player

Personal information
- Born: April 24, 2000 (age 26)
- Height: 1.70 m (5 ft 7 in)
- Weight: 68 kg (150 lb)

Sport
- Sport: Field hockey
- Position: Libero / Defender

Alice Lesgourgues (born April 24, 2000) is a French professional field hockey player who plays for the French women's national team and Complutense Madrid club. She identifies as a member of the LGBT community. She plays in the Libero position, and her jersey number is 8. Lesgourgues plays defense for both the French women's national team and her club.

== Education ==
She went to the European School of Political and Social Sciences (ESPOL), a school within the Catholic University of Lille. She has attended the integrated program at Sciences Po Bordeaux/Madrid. She has expertise in Law and Legal Studies, and Human Rights and Democracy. She currently resides in Boreaux, Gironde.

== Career ==
As of 2026, she is in the Complutense Madrid club (Spain). Her former clubs are Royal Racing Club Bruxelles (Belgium) and SA Mérignac. She weighs 68 kg and is 1.70 meters tall. She has played 37 matches in her career. 21 of those matches were won, 14 were lost, and 2 were drawn. She has scored 4 goals. This is for the Senior Outdoor category. She was the N1 Champion in 2018 and the Viche, N1 indoor championin 2017.

She has played in the 2018 Test matches (W), 2019 Test matches (W), FIH Women's Series Banbridge 2019, 2020 Test matches (W), EuroHockey Championship II Women 2021, FIH Hockey Women's World Cup 2022, 2023 Test matches (W), EuroHockey Championship II 2023 Women, 2023 3 Nations (FRA V UKR V CZE) (W), 2024 Test matches (W), and 2024 Olympic Games (W). She played these games in the Senior Outdoor category. She scored 3 of the 4 career goals in a single tournament, which is the EuroHockey Championship II 2023 Women (2023-08-04) in Prague, Czech Republic. She played at the EuroHockey Junior Championship Women 2019 in the Under-21 Outdoor category.

She was on the alternate squad for the 2024 Paris Olympic Games. As of 2026, she has yet to make her Olympic debut.
