= 2017 Women's EuroHockey Championship II =

European field hockey tournament in Wales

Tournament details
- Host country: Wales
- City: Cardiff
- Dates: 6–12 August
- Teams: 8 (from 1 confederation)
- Venue: Sport Wales National Centre

Final positions
- Champions: Belarus (1st title)
- Runner-up: Russia
- Third place: Italy

Tournament statistics
- Matches played: 20
- Goals scored: 78 (3.9 per match)
- Top scorer: (Russia) Bogdana Sadovaia (8 goals)

The 2017 Women's EuroHockey Championship II was the 7th edition of the Women's EuroHockey Championship II. It was held from the 6 to 12 August 2017 in Cardiff, Wales. The tournament will also serve as a direct qualifier for the 2019 EuroHockey Championship, with the winner Belarus and runner-up Russia qualifying.

== Qualified teams ==
- Austria
- Belarus
- France
- Italy
- Poland
- Russia
- Ukraine
- Wales

== Format ==
The eight teams will be split into two groups of four teams. The top two teams from each pool advance to the semifinals to determine the winner in a knockout system. The bottom two teams from each pool play in a new group with the teams they did not play against in the group stage. The last team will be relegated to the EuroHockey Championship III.

== Results ==
All times are local (UTC+0).

=== Preliminary round ===
==== Pool A ====
Pos	Team	Pld	W	D	L	GF	GA	GD	Pts	Qualification
1	Russia	3	2	1	0	11	2	+9	7	Semi-finals
2	Italy	3	2	1	0	11	3	+8	7	Semi-finals
3	Ukraine	3	1	0	2	3	9	−6	3	
4	France	3	0	0	3	1	12	−11	0	

Source: FIH
Rules for classification: 1) points; 2) goal difference; 3) goals scored; 4) head-to-head result.

6 August 2017
11:15

France	0–1	Ukraine
	Report	Shevchenko 16'

Umpires:
Frances Block (ENG)
Carol Lewis (WAL)

6 August 2017
13:30

Italy	1–1	Russia
Braconi 45'	Report	Diagileva 12'

Umpires:
Tatyana Kaltypan (UKR)
Sviatlana Karzhevich (BLR)

7 August 2017
15:45

Russia	6–0	Ukraine
Sadovaia 26', 34', 49'; Fedorova 36'; Osipova 47'; Svezhentseva 58'	Report

Umpires:
Xenia Ulrich (AUT)
Urszula Lapawa (POL)

7 August 2017
18:00

France	0–7	Italy
	Report	Singh 8'; Mastronardi 27'; Carta 29'; Oviedo 34', 56'; Braconi 44'; Pacella 60'

Umpires:
Tatyana Kaltypan (UKR)
Rebecca Woodcock (ENG)

7 August 2017
11:15

Italy	3–2	Ukraine
Braconi 23', 38', 47'	Report	Kernoz 16'; Vorushylo 44'

Umpires:
Rebecca Woodcock (ENG)
Xenia Ulrich (AUT)

7 August 2017
13:30

Russia	4–1	France
Diagileva 26'; Sadovaia 38', 39'; Zelenova 44'	Report	Lhopital 53'

Umpires:
Ilaria Amorosini (ITA)
Celine Martin-Schmets (BEL)

==== Pool B ====
Pos	Team	Pld	W	D	L	GF	GA	GD	Pts	Qualification
1	Belarus	3	3	0	0	11	2	+9	9	Semi-finals
2	Wales	3	2	0	1	9	5	+4	6	Semi-finals
3	Poland	3	1	0	2	2	3	−1	3	
4	Austria	3	0	0	3	1	13	−12	0	

Source: FIH
Rules for classification: 1) points; 2) goal difference; 3) goals scored; 4) head-to-head result.

6 August 2017
18:00

Poland	0–2	Belarus
	Report	Sazhina 21'; Shtsin 40'

Umpires:
Valeria Kolbina (RUS)
Celine Martin-Schmets (BEL)

6 August 2017
15:45

Austria	1–6	Wales
Podpera 18'	Report	Evans 3'; Marke-Jones 12', 50'; Jordan 21'; Wilkinson 22'; Daley 37'

Umpires:
Rebecca Woodcock (ENG)
Ilaria Amorosini (ITA)

8 August 2017
15:45

Belarus	5–0	Austria
Bahushevich 15'; Silitskaya 19'; Papkova 34'; Batura 37'; Skryba 58'	Report

Umpires:
Carol Lewis (WAL)
Urszula Lapawa (POL)

8 August 2017
18:00

Poland	0–1	Wales
	Report	Richards 57'

Umpires:
Valeria Kolbina (RUS)
Xenia Ulrich (AUT)

9 August 2017
15:45

Austria	0–2	Poland
	Report	Wessolowska 30'; Zagajska 32'

Umpires:
Sviatlana Karzhevich (BLR)
Tatyana Kaltypan (UKR)

9 August 2017
18:00

Belarus	4–2	Wales
Batura 19'; Bahushevich 30'; Mikheichyk 37'; Shtsin 60'	Report	Wilkinson 27'; Laity 32'

Umpires:
Frances Block (ENG)
Urszula Lapawa (POL)

=== Fifth to eighth place classification ===
==== Pool C ====
The points obtained in the preliminary round against the other team are taken over.

Pos	Team	Pld	W	D	L	GF	GA	GD	Pts	Relegation
1	Poland	3	2	1	0	4	1	+3	7	
2	Ukraine	3	2	1	0	5	3	+2	7	
3	Austria	3	1	0	2	6	7	−1	3	
4	France	3	0	0	3	2	6	−4	0	Relegated to EuroHockey Championship III

Source: FIH
Rules for classification: 1) points; 2) goal difference; 3) goals scored; 4) head-to-head result.

11 August 2017
09:30

France	1–3	Austria
Lansiaux 55'	Report	Dvorak 25'; Reichstein 38'; Sandner 43'

Umpires:
Tatyana Kaltypan (UKR)
Urszula Lapawa (POL)

11 August 2017
11:45

Ukraine	0–0	Poland
	Report

Umpires:
Carol Lewis (WAL)
Xenia Ulrich (AUT)

12 August 2017
09:30

Ukraine	4–3	Austria
Khilko 7'; Vorushylo 18'; Ponomarenko 33'; Stetsenko 34'	Report	Konrat 11'; Sandner 57'; Zerbs 58'

Umpires:
Valeria Kolbina (RUS)
Carol Lewis (WAL)

12 August 2017
11:45

Poland	2–1	France
Zagajska 18'; Slawinska 28'	Report	Demars 30'

Umpires:
Sviatlana Karzhevich (BLR)
Xenia Ulrich (AUT)

=== First to fourth place classification ===
Semi-finals
11 August 2017
Belarus	4
Italy	2
11 August 2017
Russia	2
Wales	1

Final
12 August 2017
Belarus	2
Russia	1
Third Place Match
12 August 2017
Italy	3
Wales	0

==== Semi-finals ====
11 August 2017
14:00

Belarus	4–2	Italy
Batura 2'; Papkova 30'; Mikheichyk 47'; Bahushevich 51'	Report	Carta 10'; Mastronardi 33'

Umpires:
Celine Martin-Schmets (BEL)
Rebecca Woodcock (ENG)

11 August 2017
16:30

Russia	2–1	Wales
Sadovaia 31', 51'	Report	Wilkinson 35'

Umpires:
Frances Block (WAL)
Ilaria Amorosini (ITA)

==== Third and fourth place ====
12 August 2017
14:00

Italy	3–0	Wales
Tiddi 30'; Traverso 38'; Carta 59'	Report

Umpires:
Tatyana Kaltypan (UKR)
Frances Block (ENG)

==== Final ====
12 August 2017
16:30

Belarus	2–1	Russia
Sazhina 56'; Batura 58'	Report	Sadovaia 49'

Umpires:
Celine Martin-Schmets (BEL)
Ilaria Amorosini (ITA)

== Final standings ==
Rank	Team
Gold medal	Belarus
Silver medal	Russia
Bronze medal	Italy
4	Wales
5	Poland
6	Ukraine
7	Austria
8	France

== See also ==
- 2017 Men's EuroHockey Championship II
- 2017 Women's EuroHockey Championship III
- 2017 Women's EuroHockey Nations Championship
