= Viche =

Viche may refer to:

- Viche (drink), a Colombian alcoholic drink
- Veche (Ukrainian viche), a popular assembly in medieval Slavic countries
- Aktsent (formerly Viche), a Ukrainian political party
- Viche Formation, a geologic formation in Ecuador
