= 2023 Women's EuroHockey Championship II =

Field hockey tournament

Tournament details
- Host country: Czechia
- City: Prague
- Dates: 30 July–5 August
- Teams: 8 (from 1 confederation)
- Venue: SK Slavia Prague

Final positions
- Champions: France (1st title)
- Runner-up: Czech Republic
- Third place: Wales

Tournament statistics
- Matches played: 20
- Goals scored: 100 (5 per match)
- Top scorer: (Ukraine) Karyna Leonova (5 goals)
- Best player: (France) Philippine Delemazure
- Best goalkeeper: (Czech Republic) Barbora Ćecháková

The 2023 Women's EuroHockey Championship II was the tenth edition of the Women's EuroHockey Championship II, the second level of the women's European field hockey championships organized by the European Hockey Federation. It was held from 30 July to 5 August 2023 in Prague, Czechia.

The top two teams aside from France and Wales qualified for the 2024 Women's FIH Hockey Olympic Qualifiers. France won their first Women's EuroHockey Championship II title by defeating the hosts Czech Republic 2–0 in the final.

== Preliminary round ==
All times are local (UTC+2).

=== Pool A ===
Pos	Team	Pld	W	D	L	GF	GA	GD	Pts	Qualification
1	Czech Republic (H)	3	2	1	0	18	2	+16	7	Semi-finals
2	Ukraine	3	2	1	0	17	2	+15	7	Semi-finals
3	Poland	3	1	0	2	10	5	+5	3	
4	Slovakia	3	0	0	3	0	36	−36	0	

Source: FIH
Rules for classification: 1) points; 2) matches won; 3) goal difference; 4) goals for; 5) head-to-head result; 6) field goals for.
(H) Hosts

30 July 2023
15:45

Poland	8–0	Slovakia
Czujewicz 11'; Balcerzak 17'; Suszynska 20'; Rybacha 25'; Skoraszewska 27'; Polewczak 35'; Slawinska 52'; Zimmermann 60'	Report

Umpires:
Ana Ortega (ESP)
Alexandra Mahieu (BEL)

30 July 2023
18:00

Czech Republic	1–1	Ukraine
Hájková 60'	Report	Tanchenko 21'

Umpires:
Rebecca Edwards (ENG)
Cynthia Clement (GHA)

1 August 2023
16:45

Ukraine	14–0	Slovakia
Leonova 3', 16', 17', 52'; Khilko 9', 35', 59'; Shokalenko 25', 40', 44'; Ponomarenko 28'; Kasianova 36'; Kurovska 55'; Shyshyna 60'	Report

Umpires:
Noelia Blanco (ESP)
Cathy Wright (WAL)

1 August 2023
19:00

Poland	1–3	Czech Republic
Drozda 36'	Report	Tlamsová 19'; Nedvědová 27'; Duchková 43'

Umpires:
Alexandra Mahieu (BEL)
Kamile Mockaityte (LTU)

2 August 2023
16:45

Ukraine	2–1	Poland
Leonova 17'; Movchan 43'	Report	Strubbe 18'

Umpires:
Ana Ortega (ESP)
Kamile Mockaityte (LTU)

2 August 2023
19:00

Czech Republic	14–0	Slovakia
Babická 11', 17'; Topinková 18', 48'; Lehovcová 24', 31', 42'; Laciná 25', 41', 47'; Decsy 30'; Hájková 45', 56'; Nováková 52'	Report

Umpires:
Cynthia Clement (GHA)
Cathy Wright (WAL)

=== Pool B ===
Pos	Team	Pld	W	D	L	GF	GA	GD	Pts	Qualification
1	France	3	3	0	0	16	1	+15	9	Semi-finals
2	Wales	3	1	1	1	6	3	+3	4	Semi-finals
3	Austria	3	1	1	1	2	5	−3	4	
4	Lithuania	3	0	0	3	0	15	−15	0	

Source: FIH
Rules for classification: 1) points; 2) matches won; 3) goal difference; 4) goals for; 5) head-to-head result; 6) field goals for.

30 July 2023
11:15

Wales	0–0	Austria
	Report

Umpires:
Kamile Mockaityte (LTU)
Pauline Cuypers (BEL)

30 July 2023
13:30

France	8–0	Lithuania
Verzura 4'; Arnaud 15', 44'; Delemazure 29', 50'; Lardeur 40'; Le Nindre 54'; Lesgourgues 57'	Report

Umpires:
Cathy Wright (WAL)
Teresa Lipsky (GER)

31 July 2023
16:45

Austria	2–0	Lithuania
Proksch 19'; Felber 45'	Report

Umpires:
Noelia Blanco (ESP)
Pauline Cuypers (BEL)

31 July 2023
19:00

France	3–1	Wales
Verzura 7'; Le Nindre 8'; Gaspari 50'	Report	Hoskins 35'

Umpires:
Ana Ortega (ESP)
Rebecca Edwards (ENG)

2 August 2023
12:15

Wales	5–0	Lithuania
Hoskins 20', 20', 21'; Hughes 35'; Richards 43'	Report

Umpires:
Teresa Lipsky (GER)
Noelia Blanco (ESP)

2 August 2023
14:30

Austria	0–5	France
	Report	Lhopital 14', 21'; Lesgourgues 25'; Le Nindre 28', 41'

Umpires:
Rebecca Edwards (ENG)
Pauline Cuypers (BEL)

== Fifth to eighth place classification ==
The points obtained in the preliminary round against the other team will be carried over.

Pos	Team	Pld	W	D	L	GF	GA	GD	Pts
5	Poland	3	3	0	0	13	1	+12	9
6	Austria	3	2	0	1	13	2	+11	6
7	Lithuania	3	1	0	2	5	6	−1	3
8	Slovakia	3	0	0	3	1	23	−22	0

Source: FIH
Rules for classification: 1) points; 2) matches won; 3) goal difference; 4) goals for; 5) head-to-head result; 6) field goals for.

4 August 2023
10:15

Slovakia	1–5	Lithuania
Pedersen 45'	Report	Kukliene 18', 45'; Grigiene 25'; Jakovlena 26', 56'

Umpires:
Noelia Blanco (ESP)
Cynthia Clement (GHA)

4 August 2023
12:30

Poland	2–1	Austria
Balcerzak 47'; Slawinska 57'	Report	Klausbruckner 6'

Umpires:
Cathy Wright (WAL)
Teresa Lipsky (GER)

5 August 2023
09:00

Poland	3–0	Lithuania
Mazur 2'; Suszynska 25'; Polewczak 35'	Report

Umpires:
Pauline Cuypers (BEL)
Cathy Wright (WAL)

5 August 2023
11:15

Austria	10–0	Slovakia
Klausbruckner 9', 37'; Felber 12', 59'; Bauer 26', 58'; Proksch 41'; Konrat 45'; Buchta 51'; Hruby 60'	Report

Umpires:
Cynthia Clement (GHA)
Teresa Lipsky (GER)

== First to fourth place classification ==
=== Bracket ===
Semi-finals
4 August
Czech Republic	1
Wales	0
4 August
France	2
Ukraine	0

Final
5 August
Czech Republic	0
France	2
Third place
5 August
Wales (p.s.o.)	2 (3)
Ukraine	2 (0)

=== Semi-finals ===
4 August 2023
17:00

Czech Republic	1–0	Wales
Topinková 50'	Report

Umpires:
Rebecca Edwards (ENG)
Pauline Cuypers (BEL)

4 August 2023
14:45

France	2–0	Ukraine
Delemazure 7'; Verzura 47'	Report

Umpires:
Kamile Mockaityte (LTU)
Alexandra Mahieu (BEL)

=== Third and fourth place ===
5 August 2023
13:45

Wales	2–2	Ukraine
Bingham 35'; Howell 40'	Report	Movchan 12'; Moroz 26'
Penalties
Richards (penalty shoot-out scored); Jones (penalty shoot-out missed); Webb (penalty shoot-out scored); Holme (penalty shoot-out scored)	3–0	(penalty shoot-out missed) Tanchenko; (penalty shoot-out missed) Movchan; (penalty shoot-out missed) Shokalenko

Umpires:
Alexandra Mahieu (BEL)
Ana Ortega (ESP)

=== Final ===
5 August 2023
16:00

Czech Republic	0–2	France
	Report	Lesgourgues 2'; Schubert 7'

Umpires:
Rebecca Edwards (ENG)
Kamile Mockaityte (LTU)

== Final standings ==
Pos	Team	Qualification
1	France (Note: France is already qualified for the Olympics as the host nation.)	
2	Czech Republic (H)	2024 FIH Hockey Olympic Qualifiers
3	Wales (Note: Wales is not eligible for the Olympics.)	
4	Ukraine	2024 FIH Hockey Olympic Qualifiers
5	Poland	
6	Austria	
7	Lithuania	
8	Slovakia	

Source: FIH
(H) Host

== See also ==
- 2023 Women's EuroHockey Championship
- 2023 Women's EuroHockey Championship III
- 2023 Men's EuroHockey Championship II
