= Xenna Hughes =

Welsh field hockey player

Personal information
- Born: 19 September 1992 (age 34) Wrexham, Wales

Sport
- Sport: Field hockey
- Position: Forward & Defender
- Club: Bowdon
National team
Years	Team	Caps	Goals
2011–present	Wales	123	(12)

Xenna Hughes (born 19 September 1992) is a Welsh international field hockey player who plays both as a forward or defender for Wales.

She plays club hockey in the Women's England Hockey League Premier Division for Bowdon.

She represented Wales at the 2014 Commonwealth Games and 2018 Commonwealth Games.

Hughes made her international debut for Wales on 29 September 2012 against India.

== Personal life ==
Hughes is the only daughter of footballer Mark Hughes and was born in Wrexham, Wales. She was married on 23 August 2025.
