= Sophia Schwabe =

German field hockey player (born 2003)

Personal information
- Born: 28 July 2003 (age 23) Duisburg, Germany

Sport
- Sport: Field hockey
- Position: Forward
- Club: Düsseldorfer HC
National team
Years	Team	Caps	Goals
2022–	Germany	8	(2)
2022–2024	Germany U–21	25	(6)
Medal record
Women's field hockey
Representing Germany
EuroHockey Championship
Silver medal – second place	2025 Mönchengladbach
FIH Junior World Cup
Silver medal – second place	2022 Potchefstroom
EuroHockey U–21 Championship
Gold medal – first place	2022 Ghent
EuroHockey U–18 Championship
Gold medal – first place	2021 Valencia

Sophia Schwabe (born 28 July 2003) is a field hockey player from Germany.

== Personal life ==
Sophia Schwabe was born and raised in Duisburg, Germany.

== Career ==
=== Domestic leagues ===
In the German Bundesliga and the Euro Hockey Leagues, Schwabe represents Düsseldorfer HC.

=== Under–21 ===
Schwabe made her debut for the German U–21 team in 2022. She was named in the national junior squad in 2021 for the FIH Junior World Cup in Potchefstroom. Due to the COVID-19 pandemic, the competition was later postponed resulting in squad changes, however she retained her place in the side. At the delayed event in 2022, she helped the German team to a silver medal. Later that year she won a gold medal with the junior squad at the EuroHockey U–21 Championship in Ghent.

She also represented the squad at the 2023 FIH Junior World Cup in Santiago and the 2024 EuroHockey U–21 Championship in Terrassa.

=== Die Danas ===
Prior to her departure for the FIH Junior World Cup in 2022, Schwabe received her first call–up to the senior national squad. She made her debut for Die Danas during a match against Spain in the 2021–22 FIH Pro League, held in Düsseldorf.

She did not receive another call–up to the national squad until 2024. She was included in the team to travel to Santiago del Estero and Bhubaneswar for Germany's away legs of the 2024–25 FIH Pro League.

== International goals ==
The following is a list of goals scored by Schwabe at international level.

Goal	Date	Location	Opponent	Score	Result	Competition	Ref.
1	13 December 2024	Polideportivo Provincial, Santiago del Estero, Argentina	Argentina	1–0	1–1	2024–25 FIH Pro League	
2	15 February 2025	Kalinga Stadium, Bhubaneswar, India	Spain	1–1	1–2	2024–25 FIH Pro League	
