= Camille Belis =

Belgian field hockey player (born 2004)

Personal information
- Born: 23 October 2004 (age 21)

Sport
- Sport: Field hockey
- Position: Midfielder
- Club: Braxgata HC
National team
Years	Team	Caps	Goals
2022–present	Belgium U21	5	(0)
2022–present	Belgium	61	(0)
Medal record
Women's field hockey
Representing Belgium
World Cup
Bronze medal – third place	2026 Wavre/Amstelveen
FIH Junior World Cup
Bronze medal – third place	2025 Santiago	Team
- Updated on 6 November 2025

Camille Belis (born 23 October 2004) is a Belgian field hockey player. She represented Belgium at the 2024 Summer Olympics.
