= Veronika Decsy =

Czech field hockey player

Personal information
- Born: 23 September 1994 (age 31) Czech Republic

Sport
- Sport: Field hockey
- Position: Forward
Senior career
Years	Team	Caps	Goals
–	Praga	-	-
National team
Years	Team	Caps	Goals
2013–2015	Czech Republic U–21	20	(2)
2014–	Czech Republic	80	(34)
Medal record
Women's field hockey
Representing Czech Republic
EuroHockey Championship II
Silver medal – second place	2015 Prague
Silver medal – second place	2023 Prague

Veronika Decsy (born 23 September 1994) is a Czech field hockey player.

== Life ==
Decsy was born on 23 September 1994.

== Career ==
=== Domestic league ===
In the Czech National League, Decsy represents HC 1946 Praga.

=== Under–21 ===
In 2014, Decsy was a member of the Czech Republic U–21 team at the EuroHockey Junior Championship in Waterloo.

=== Field hockey ===
Decsy made her senior international debut in 2014 during round one of the 2012–13 FIH World League.

Throughout her career, Decsy has been present at numerous international events. She has medalled with the national team on two occasions, taking home silver at the 2015 and 2023 editions of the EuroHockey Championship II.

She has been named in the squad for the 2024 FIH Olympic Qualifiers in Ranchi.
