= 2021 Women's EuroHockey Championship II =

Field hockey tournament

Tournament details
- Host country: Czech Republic
- City: Prague
- Dates: 15–21 August 2021
- Teams: 8 (from 1 confederation)
- Venue: SK Slavia Prague

Final positions
- Champions: Belarus (2nd title)
- Runner-up: France
- Third place: Poland

Tournament statistics
- Matches played: 20
- Goals scored: 70 (3.5 per match)
- Top scorer: (Poland) Marlena Rybacha (5 goals)

The 2021 Women's EuroHockey Championship II was the ninth edition of the Women's EuroHockey Championship II, the second level of the women's European field hockey championship organized by the European Hockey Federation. It was held from 15 to 21 August 2021 in Prague, Czech Republic.

The top five teams qualified for the European qualifier for the 2022 Women's FIH Hockey World Cup.

Belarus won their second EuroHockey Championship II title by defeating France 1–0 in the final. Poland won the bronze medal by defeating Wales 4–1.

== Qualified teams ==
Participating nations have qualified based on their final ranking from the 2019 competition.

Dates	Event	Location	Quotas	Qualifiers
16–25 August 2019	2019 EuroHockey Championship	Antwerp, Belgium	2	Belarus (21); Russia (19)
4–10 August 2019	2019 EuroHockey Championship II	Glasgow, Scotland	4	Austria (31); Czech Republic (23); Poland (24); Wales (26)
28 July – 3 August 2019	2019 EuroHockey Championship III	Lipovci, Slovenia	2	France (28); Lithuania (34)
Total			8	

== Umpires ==
The following nine umpires were appointed for the tournament by the EHF:

- Clare Barwood (WAL)
- Elena Ozerskaia (BLR)
- Stepanka Smidova (CZE)
- Céline Martin-Schmets (BEL)
- Kamilė Mockaitytė (LTU)
- Gema Calderon (ESP)
- Ines El Hajem (FRA)
- Lorijn de Kraker (NED)
- Ksenia Zubareva (RUS)

== Preliminary round ==
=== Pool A ===
Pos	Team	Pld	W	D	L	GF	GA	GD	Pts	Qualification
1	Poland	3	2	1	0	7	3	+4	7	Semi-finals and 2022 World Cup qualifier
2	Wales	3	2	0	1	8	3	+5	6	Semi-finals and 2022 World Cup qualifier
3	Russia	3	1	1	1	7	4	+3	4	
4	Lithuania	3	0	0	3	0	12	−12	0	

Source: FIH
Rules for classification: 1) points; 2) matches won; 3) goal difference; 4) goals for; 5) head-to-head result; 6) field goals for.

15 August 2021
11:15

Russia	0–2	Wales
	Report	Richards 29'; Howell 39'

Umpires:
Gema Calderon (ESP)
Stepanka Smidova (CZE)

15 August 2021
13:30

Poland	2–0	Lithuania
Rybacha 43'; Zagajska 49'	Report

Umpires:
Lorijn de Kraker (NED)
Ines El Hajem (FRA)

16 August 2021
16:45

Wales	5–0	Lithuania
Howell 10'; Thorburn 11'; Hoskins 36'; Hughes 37', 60+'	Report

Umpires:
Nadine Schuschel (GER)
Lorijn de Kraker (NED)

16 August 2021
19:00

Poland	2–2	Russia
Rybacha 22'; Katerla 32'	Report	Ovanesova 46'; Khalimova 59'

Umpires:
Céline Martin-Schmets (BEL)
Gema Calderon (ESP)

18 August 2021
12:15

Russia	5–0	Lithuania
Kolpakova 26'; Sadovaia 37'; Khalimova 41', 60'; Ovanesova 46'	Report

Umpires:
Stepanka Smidova (CZE)
Ines El Hajem (FRA)

18 August 2021
14:30

Wales	1–3	Poland
Howell 26'	Report	Rybacha 18', 41'; Blaszyk 43'

Umpires:
Kamile Mockaityte (LTU)
Gema Calderon (ESP)

=== Pool B ===
Pos	Team	Pld	W	D	L	GF	GA	GD	Pts	Qualification
1	France	3	3	0	0	4	1	+3	9	Semi-finals and 2022 World Cup qualifier
2	Belarus	3	1	1	1	6	5	+1	4	Semi-finals and 2022 World Cup qualifier
3	Austria	3	0	2	1	4	5	−1	2	
4	Czech Republic (H)	3	0	1	2	3	6	−3	1	

Source: FIH
Rules for classification: 1) points; 2) matches won; 3) goal difference; 4) goals for; 5) head-to-head result; 6) field goals for.
(H) Hosts

15 August 2021
15:45

Belarus	1–2	France
Papkova 12'	Report	Arnaud 37'; Lhopital 57'

Umpires:
Kamile Mockaityte (LTU)
Ksenia Zubareva (RUS)

15 August 2021
18:00

Czech Republic	2–2	Austria
Mejzlíková 34'; N. Nováková 48'	Report	Czech 11'; Konrat 37'

Umpires:
Céline Martin-Schmets (BEL)
Clare Barwood (WAL)

17 August 2021
16:45

France	1–0	Austria
Verzura 5'	Report

Umpires:
Nadine Schuschel (GER)
Kamile Mockaityte (LTU)

17 August 2021
19:00

Czech Republic	1–3	Belarus
Mejzlíková 33'	Report	Papkova 3'; Filipovich 18'; Batsiukova 30'

Umpires:
Ines El Hajem (FRA)
Clare Barwood (WAL)

18 August 2021
16:45

Belarus	2–2	Austria
Papkova 22'; Shtsin 59'	Report	Czech 24', 51'

Umpires:
Nadine Schuschel (GER)
Clare Barwood (WAL)

18 August 2021
19:00

France	1–0	Czech Republic
Verrier 52'	Report

Umpires:
Ksenia Zubareva (RUS)
Céline Martin-Schmets (BEL)

== Fifth to eighth place classification ==
=== Pool C ===
The points obtained in the preliminary round against the other team are taken over.

Pos	Team	Pld	W	D	L	GF	GA	GD	Pts	Qualification
5	Russia	3	2	1	0	10	2	+8	7	2022 World Cup qualifier
6	Czech Republic (H)	3	1	2	0	7	4	+3	5	
7	Austria	3	1	1	1	7	6	+1	4	
8	Lithuania	3	0	0	3	1	13	−12	0	

Source: FIH
Rules for classification: 1) points; 2) matches won; 3) goal difference; 4) goals for; 5) head-to-head result; 6) field goals for.
(H) Hosts

20 August 2021
10:15

Lithuania	0–3	Czech Republic
	Report	Laciná 14'; Lehovcová 34', 41'

Umpires:
Ksenia Zubareva (RUS)
Ines El Hajem (FRA)

20 August 2021
12:30

Russia	3–0	Austria
Leonova 12'; Makagonova 26'; Ovanesova 51'	Report

Umpires:
Lorijn de Kraker (NED)
Kamile Mockaityte (LTU)

21 August 2021
09:00

Russia	2–2	Czech Republic
Sadovaia 23'; Sartakova 37'	Report	N. Nováková 18'; Mejzlíková 60'

Umpires:
Kamile Mockaityte (LTU)
Nadine Schuschel (GER)

21 August 2021
11:15

Austria	5–1	Lithuania
Konrat 5'; Herzog 11'; Hruby 32'; Czech 43'; Laginja 47'	Report	Bartkuvienè 57'

Umpires:
Stepanka Sidova (UKR)
Clare Barwood (WAL)

== First to fourth place classification ==
=== Bracket ===
Semi-finals
20 August
Poland	1
Belarus	5
20 August
France	2
Wales	1

Final
21 August
Belarus	1
France	0
Third place
21 August
Poland	4
Wales	1

=== Semi-finals ===
20 August 2021
14:45

Poland	1–5	Belarus
Diurczak 60'	Report	Belavusava 44'; Skryba 47'; Kasabutskaya 52'; Shtsin 56'; Papkova 58'

Umpires:
Céline Martin-Schmets (BEL)
Clare Barwood (WAL)

20 August 2021
17:00

France	2–1	Wales
Brachet 34'; Van der Zanden 41'	Report	Robinson 48'

Umpires:
Gema Calderon (ESP)
Nadine Schuschel (GER)

=== Third place game ===
21 August 2021
13:45

Poland	4–1	Wales
Zagajska 24'; Rybacha 25'; Wypijewska 29'; Blaszyk 50'	Report	Laity 38'

Umpires:
Lorijn de Kraker (NED)
Ines el Hajem (FRA)

=== Final ===
21 August 2021
16:00

Belarus	1–0	France
Filipovich 53'	Report

Umpires:
Céline Martin-Schmets (BEL)
Gema Calderon (ESP)

== Statistics ==
=== Final standings ===
Pos	Team	Qualification
1	Belarus	2022 World Cup qualifier
2	France	2022 World Cup qualifier
3	Poland	2022 World Cup qualifier
4	Wales	2022 World Cup qualifier
5	Russia	2022 World Cup qualifier
6	Czech Republic (H)	
7	Austria	
8	Lithuania	

Source: FIH
(H) Host

=== Goalscorers ===
There were 70 goals scored in 20 matches, for an average of 3.5 goals per match.

5 goals

- (Poland) Marlena Rybacha

4 goals

- (Austria) Johanna Czech
- (Belarus) Krestsina Papkova

3 goals

- (Czech Republic) Tereza Mejzlíková
- (Russia) Alina Khalimova
- (Russia) Mariia Ovanesova
- (Wales) Isabelle Howell

2 goals

- (Austria) Ruth Konrat
- (Belarus) Yauheniya Filipovich
- (Belarus) Natallia Shtsin
- (Czech Republic) Adéla Lehovcová
- (Czech Republic) Natálie Nováková
- (Poland) Wiktoria Blaszyk
- (Poland) Magdalena Zagajska
- (Russia) Bogdana Sadovaia
- (Wales) Xenna Hughes

1 goal

- (Austria) Helene Herzog
- (Austria) Sabrina Hruby
- (Austria) Marta Laginja
- (Belarus) Dziyana Batsiukova
- (Belarus) Darya Belavusava
- (Belarus) Ulyana Kasabutskaya
- (Belarus) Volha Skryba
- (Czech Republic) Kateřina Laciná
- (France) Victoire Arnaud
- (France) Julie Brachet
- (France) Yohanna Lhopital
- (France) Gabrielle Verrier
- (France) Eve Verzura
- (France) Emma van der Zanden
- (Lithuania) Ramunė Bartkuvienè
- (Poland) Karolina Diurczak
- (Poland) Amelia Katerla
- (Poland) Martyna Wypijewska
- (Russia) Anastasia Kolpakova
- (Russia) Aleksandra Leonova
- (Russia) Ekaterina Makagonova
- (Russia) Luliia Sartakova
- (Wales) Olivia Hoskins
- (Wales) Eloise Laity
- (Wales) Phoebe Richards
- (Wales) Sophie Robinson
- (Wales) Sarah-Jayne Thorburn

Source: FIH

== See also ==
- 2021 Men's EuroHockey Championship II
- 2021 Women's EuroHockey Championship III
- 2021 Women's EuroHockey Nations Championship
