= Elizabeth Bingham =

American politician

Member of the Wyoming House of Representatives from the 17th district
- member-elect
- Assumed office January 4, 2027
- Preceded by: J.T. Larson

Personal details
- Party: Republican
- Website: Campaign website

Elizabeth Bingham is an American politician. A member of the Republican Party, she is the member-elect of the Wyoming House of Representatives for the 17th district. She was elected at the 2026 election. She is a former Chairman of the Sweetwater County Republican Party.
