= Sarah Jones (field hockey) =

Welsh field hockey player

Personal information
- Full name: Sarah Louise Jones
- Born: 25 June 1990 (age 36) Cardiff, Wales

Sport
- Sport: Field hockey
- Position: Midfielder
- Club: Wimbledon Hockey Club
National team
Years	Team	Caps	Goals
2011–present	Wales	129	(22)
2018–2024	Great Britain	73	(9)
–	WALES & GB TOTAL:	202	(31)
Medal record
Field hockey
Representing Great Britain
Olympic Games
Bronze medal – third place	2020 Tokyo	Team
- Updated on 14/08/26

Sarah Louise Jones (born 25 June 1990) is a Welsh international field hockey player who plays as a midfielder or forward for Wales and Great Britain.

She plays club hockey in the Women's England Hockey League Premier Division for Wimbledon Hockey Club.

Jones has also played for Holcombe, Reading and Cardiff Athletic Hockey Club.

She represented Wales at the 2014 Commonwealth Games, 2018 Commonwealth Games and 2022 Commonwealth Games.

Jones made her international debut for Wales in 2011 and for Great Britain on 17 November 2018 v China.
