= Amy Costello =

Scottish field hockey player

Personal information
- Full name: Amy Ewart Costello
- Born: 14 January 1998 (age 28) Edinburgh, Scotland
- Height: 1.74 m (5 ft 9 in)

Sport
- Sport: Field hockey
- Position: Defender
- Club: HGC
National team
| Years | Team | Caps | Goals |
| 2016 | Scotland | 59 | (6) |
| 2018 | Great Britain | 32 | (1) |
Medal record
Women's field hockey
Representing Great Britain
Olympic Games
| Bronze medal – third place | 2020 Tokyo | Team |

Amy Ewart Costello (born 14 January 1998) is a Scottish field hockey player who plays as a defender in the Dutch Women's Hoofdklasse Hockey for HGC and for the Scotland and Great Britain national teams.

== Club career ==
She plays club hockey in the Dutch Women's Hoofdklasse Hockey for HGC.

Costello previously played in the German Women's Feldhockey Bundesliga for UHC Hamburg (2021-2024), and in the Women's England Hockey League Premier Division for East Grinstead. She has also played for University of Birmingham and Edinburgh University Women's Hockey Club.

== International career ==
She was included in the Great Britain squad for the women's field hockey tournament at the 2020 Summer Olympics, held in July and August 2021. Though designated as an alternate player, due to rule changes caused by the COVID-19 pandemic she was eligible to compete in all matches (unlike previous tournaments, in which alternates could only compete after permanently replacing an injured player). Though Great Britain earned the bronze medal, she did not make an appearance and was therefore ineligible to receive a medal.
