= Sarah Robertson (field hockey) =

Scottish field hockey player

Personal information
- Born: 27 September 1993 (age 33) Melrose, Scotland
- Height: 1.67 m (5 ft 6 in)

Sport
- Sport: Field hockey
- Position: Midfielder or Forward
- Club: Hampstead & Westminster
National team
| Years | Team | Caps | Goals |
| 2012– | Scotland | 118 | (7) |
| 2015– | Great Britain | 101 | (7) |
Medal record
Representing Great Britain
Olympic Games
| Bronze medal – third place | 2020 Tokyo | Team |

Sarah Robertson (born 27 September 1993) is a Scottish field hockey player from Selkirk who plays as a midfielder or forward for Hampstead & Westminster and the Scotland and Great Britain national teams.

== Club career ==
She plays club hockey in the Women's England Hockey League Premier Division for Hampstead & Westminster.

Robertson has also played club hockey for Edinburgh University Women's Hockey Club, KHC Dragons in Belgium and Holcombe, and started her career with Selkirk High School and the Fjordhus Reivers club in the Scottish Borders.

She also played rugby and football in boys' teams in her home town of Selkirk, and went on to play for Hibernian Ladies FC through her teens, and win Scotland age-grade caps, before switching her full attentions to hockey.

== International career ==
She made her senior international debut for Scotland in 2012 and for Great Britain in 2015.

She made her pro league debut in 2019 where she played all but two of the matches across the tournament and scored her first goal in a GB shirt. Robertson made her Olympic debut in Tokyo as the squad took part in the delayed Games. She competed in every game and won her first Olympic medal as the team secured bronze after beating India 4-3, with Robertson scoring the stunning second goal. The next year she returned to pro league action before being a key member of the team that secured Great Britain’s place at the Paris 2024 Olympic Games. The team won bronze at the Olympic qualifiers in Seville.

She played in her second Olympic Games in Paris in the summer of 2024 and announced her GB retirement on 21 November 2024.

She also represented Scotland at the 2014 Commonwealth Games and 2018 Commonwealth Games, and plans to continue to play for her club and Scotland in 2025.
