= Women's FIH Hockey Nations Cup 2 =

International men's field hockey tournament

- Most recent season or competition: 2024–25 Women's FIH Hockey Nations Cup 2
- Sport: Field hockey
- Founded: 2024; 2 years ago
- First season: 2024–25
- No. of teams: 10
- Promotion to: FIH Hockey Nations Cup

The Women's FIH Hockey Nations Cup 2 is an international women's field hockey tournament organised annually by the International Hockey Federation. The tournament serves as the qualification tournament for the Women's FIH Hockey Nations Cup.

The tournament was founded in 2024 and the first edition will be held in June 2025 in Walcz, Poland. In June 2026, the tournament was expanded to ten teams competing, starting with the 2026–27 season.

== Results ==
| Year | Host | Final | | | Third place match | | | Number of teams |
| Year | Host | Winner | Score | Runner-up | Third place | Score | Fourth place | Number of teams |
|---|---|---|---|---|---|---|---|---|
| 2024–25 | Wałcz, Poland | France | 3–3 (3–1 pen.) | Uruguay | Wales | 1–0 | Poland | 8 |

== Summary ==
| Team | Winners | Runners-up | Third place | Fourth place |
|---|---|---|---|---|
| France | 1 (2024–25) | | | |
| Uruguay | | 1 (2024–25) | | |
| Wales | | | 1 (2024–25) | |
| Poland | | | | 1 (2024–25) |

== Team appearances ==
| Team | (Poland) 2024–25 | 2026–27 | Total |
|---|---|---|---|
| Canada | – | Q | 1 |
| Czechia | 5th | Q | 2 |
| France | 1st ▲ | – | 1 |
| Ghana | – | Q | 1 |
| Italy | 6th | – | 1 |
| Kenya | – | Q | 1 |
| Malaysia | 7th | Q | 2 |
| Poland | 4th | Q | 2 |
| Scotland | – | Q | 1 |
| South Africa | 8th | – | 1 |
| Thailand | – | Q | 1 |
| Ukraine | – | Q | 1 |
| Uruguay | 2nd ▲ | – | 1 |
| Wales | 3rd | Q | 2 |
| Total | 8 | 10 | |

== See also ==
- Women's FIH Hockey Nations Cup
- Men's FIH Hockey Nations Cup 2
