= Wales women's national field hockey team =

Wales
- Association: Hockey Wales
- Confederation: EHF (Europe)
- Head Coach: Kevin Johnson
- Assistant coach(es): Moses Lodarmasse
- Manager: Rebecca Daniels
- Captain: Sian French
Home	Away

FIH ranking
- Current: 24 (3 October 2026)

World Cup
- Appearances: 1 (first in 1983)
- Best result: 12th (1983)

EuroHockey Championship
- Appearances: 3 (first in 1987)
- Best result: 8th (1987)

The Wales women's national field hockey team represents Wales in international women's field hockey, with the exception of the Olympic Games when Welsh players are eligible to play for the Great Britain national women's field hockey team as selected. The country's main targets as laid down by Hockey Wales, Wales national governing body for hockey, are the EuroHockey Championships, the FIH World League and the Commonwealth Games.

== Tournament record ==
=== World Cup ===
- 1983 – 12th place

=== EuroHockey Championship ===
- 1987 – 8th place
- 1991 – 9th place
- 2003 – 12th place

=== EuroHockey Championship II ===
- 2005 – 7th place
- 2009 – (bronze)
- 2011 – 8th place
- 2015 – 5th place
- 2017 – 4th place
- 2019 – 5th place
- 2021 – 4th place
- 2023 – (bronze)

=== EuroHockey Championship III ===
- 2007 – (gold)
- 2013 – (gold)

=== Commonwealth Games ===
- 1998 – 11th place
- 2010 – 8th place
- 2014 – 9th place
- 2018 – 9th place
- 2022 – 8th place

=== Hockey World League ===
- 2012–13 – Round 1
- 2016–17 – 22nd place

=== Hockey Nations Cup 2 ===
- 2024–25 – (bronze)

=== FIH Hockey Series ===
- 2018–19 – Second round

== Results and fixtures ==
The following is a list of match results in the last 12 months, as well as any future matches that have been scheduled.

Win Draw Loss Fixture

=== 2026 ===
==== 2026 Women's FIH Hockey World Cup Qualifiers ====
8 March 2026 Pool B	Scotland	1–0	Wales	Hyderabad, India
17:15	Costello 20'	Report		Stadium: G. M. C. Balayogi Hockey Ground

9 March 2026 Pool B	Uruguay	3–2	Wales	Hyderabad, India
17:15	Vilar 29'; Díaz 36'; Viana 41'	Report	Atkin 5'; Goodwin 48'	Stadium: G. M. C. Balayogi Hockey Ground

11 March 2026 Pool B	India	4–1	Wales	Hyderabad, India
19:30	Sakshi 7'; Navneet 29', 34', 55'	Report	Thomas 39'	Stadium: G. M. C. Balayogi Hockey Ground

13 March 2026 5/8 Classification	South Korea	1–2	Wales	Hyderabad, India
12:45	Park Y. 46'	Report	Bingham 49', 53'	Stadium: G. M. C. Balayogi Hockey Ground

14 March 2026 5/6 Classification	Wales	0–3	Uruguay	Hyderabad, India
15:00		Report	Viana 23'; Verga 36'; Curutchague 57'	Stadium: G. M. C. Balayogi Hockey Ground

== See also ==
- Great Britain women's national field hockey team
- Wales men's national field hockey team
