= EuroHockey Nations Challenge =

Hockey tournament in Europe

The EuroHockey Nations Challenge is a competition run by the European Hockey Federation for European national field hockey teams. There are Challenges for outdoor and indoor hockey for both men's and women's sides. The Challenges precede the current EuroHockey Nations Trophy, which itself precedes the EuroHockey Nations Championship. Teams can gain promotion and relegation from their divisions based on their final standings.

== Outdoor ==
=== Men ===
==== Championship ====
Tournament	Gold	Silver	Bronze	4th	5th	6th	7th	8th	Host
Championship 2025	Germany	Netherlands	Spain	France	Belgium	England	Poland	Austria	Mönchengladbach, Germany
Championship 2023	Netherlands	England	Belgium	Germany	France	Spain	Austria	Wales	Mönchengladbach, Germany
Championship 2021	Netherlands	Germany	Belgium	England	Spain	France	Wales	Russia	Amstelveen, Netherlands
Championship 2019	Belgium	Spain	Netherlands	Germany	England	Wales	Scotland	Ireland	Antwerp, Belgium
Championship 2017	Netherlands	Belgium	England	Germany	Spain	Ireland	Austria	Poland	Amstelveen, Netherlands
Championship 2015	Netherlands	Germany	Ireland	England	Belgium	Spain	France	Russia	London, England
Championship 2013	Germany	Belgium	Netherlands	England	Spain	Ireland	Poland	Czech Republic	Boom, Belgium
Championship 2011	Germany	Netherlands	England	Belgium	Ireland	Spain	Russia	France	Mönchengladbach, Germany
Championship 2009	England	Germany	Netherlands	Spain	Belgium	France	Austria	Poland	Amstelveen, Netherlands
Championship 2007	Netherlands	Spain	Belgium	Germany	England	France	Ireland	Czech Republic	Manchester, England
Championship 2005	Spain	Netherlands	Germany	Belgium	England	France	Poland	Scotland	Leipzig, Germany

==== Championship II ====
(known as EuroHockey Nations Trophy until 2011)

Tournament	Gold	Silver	Bronze	4th	5th	6th	7th	8th	Host
Championship 2025	Wales	Ireland	Scotland	Italy	Czech Republic	Switzerland	Croatia	Portugal	Lousada, Portugal
Championship 2023	Ireland	Ukraine	Scotland	Italy	Czech Republic	Switzerland	Portugal	Turkey	Dublin, Ireland
Championship 2021	Austria	Scotland	Ireland	Poland	Italy	Ukraine	Switzerland	Croatia	Gniezno, Poland
Championship 2019	France	Russia	Austria	Poland	Italy	Ukraine	Belarus	Czech Republic	Cambrai, France
Championship 2017	Scotland	Wales	France	Russia	Ukraine	Czech Republic	Switzerland	Portugal	Glasgow, Scotland
Championship 2015	Poland	Austria	Scotland	Czech Republic	Azerbaijan	Ukraine	Switzerland	Croatia	Prague, Czech Republic
Championship 2013	Russia	France	Austria	Azerbaijan	Ukraine	Scotland	Wales	Italy	Vienna, Austria
Championship 2011	Czech Republic	Poland	Scotland	Austria	Ukraine	Wales	Sweden	Belarus	Vinnytsia, Ukraine
Trophy 2009	Ireland	Russia	Wales	Czech Republic	Scotland	Belarus	Italy	Switzerland	Wrexham, Wales
Trophy 2007	Poland	Austria	Scotland	Switzerland	Wales	Italy	Portugal	Ukraine	Lisbon, Portugal
Trophy 2005	Ireland	Czech Republic	Wales	Austria	Italy	Switzerland	Belarus	Russia	Rome, Italy

==== Championship III ====
(known as Challenge I until 2011)

Tournament	Gold	Silver	Bronze	4th	5th	6th	7th	8th	Host
Championship 2025	Ukraine	Turkey	Lithuania	Bulgaria	Finland	Malta	Hungary	Luxembourg	Kirklareli, Türkiye
Championship 2023	Poland	Croatia	Gibraltar	Malta	Lithuania	Serbia			Skierniewice, Poland
Championship 2021	Belarus	Czech Republic	Turkey	Portugal	Slovakia	Lithuania	Malta		Lousada, Portugal
Championship 2019	Croatia	Switzerland	Gibraltar	Portugal	Turkey	Slovakia	Lithuania	Malta	Gibraltar
Championship 2017	Belarus	Italy	Croatia	Turkey	Malta	Lithuania	Slovakia		Sveti Ivan Zelina, Croatia
Championship 2015	Wales	Portugal	Italy	Belarus	Turkey	Sweden			Lisbon, Portugal
Championship 2013	Switzerland	Croatia	Belarus	Portugal	Gibraltar	Sweden	Turkey	Slovakia	Lausanne, Switzerland
Championship 2011	Azerbaijan	Italy	Gibraltar	Switzerland	Croatia	Portugal	Slovakia		Catania, Italy
Challenge 2009	Ukraine	Sweden	Portugal	Azerbaijan	Croatia	Slovenia	Denmark		Zagreb, Croatia
Challenge 2007	Russia	Belarus	Croatia	Azerbaijan	Denmark	Sweden			Kazan, Russia
Challenge 2005	Ukraine	Portugal	Gibraltar	Croatia	Greece	Sweden	Hungary		Vinnitsya, Ukraine

==== Championship IV ====
(known as Challenge II until 2011)

Tournament	Gold	Silver	Bronze	4th	5th	6th	7th	8th	Host
Championship 2019	Hungary	Finland	Norway	Cyprus	Slovenia				Helsinki, Finland
Championship 2017	Gibraltar	Slovenia	Hungary	Cyprus	Finland				Lipovci, Slovenia
Championship 2015	Slovakia	Denmark	Lithuania	Malta	Hungary	Finland	Cyprus	Norway	Vilnius, Lithuania
Championship 2013	Greece	Bulgaria	Cyprus						Athens, Greece
Championship 2011	Turkey	Greece	Bulgaria	Cyprus	Georgia				Athens, Greece
Challenge 2009	Gibraltar	Slovakia	Bulgaria	Greece					Bratislava, Slovakia
Challenge 2007	Slovenia	Turkey	Serbia	Lithuania	Slovakia	Bulgaria	Finland		Predanovci, Slovenia
Challenge 2005	Denmark	Azerbaijan	Malta	Cyprus					Kordin, Malta

=== Women ===
==== Championship ====
Tournament	Gold	Silver	Bronze	4th	5th	6th	7th	8th	Host
Championship 2025	Netherlands	Germany	Spain	Belgium	England	Scotland	France	Ireland	Mönchengladbach, Germany
Championship 2023	Netherlands	Belgium	Germany	England	Ireland	Spain	Scotland	Italy	Mönchengladbach, Germany
Championship 2021	Netherlands	Germany	Belgium	Spain	England	Ireland	Scotland	Italy	Amstelveen, Netherlands
Championship 2019	Netherlands	Germany	Spain	England	Ireland	Belgium	Russia	Belarus	Antwerp, Belgium
Championship 2017	Netherlands	Belgium	England	Germany	Spain	Ireland	Czech Republic	Scotland	Amstelveen, Netherlands
Championship 2015	England	Netherlands	Germany	Spain	Belgium	Scotland	Italy	Poland	London, England
Championship 2013	Germany	England	Netherlands	Belgium	Spain	Scotland	Ireland	Belarus	Boom, Belgium
Championship 2011	Netherlands	Germany	England	Spain	Belgium	Ireland	Azerbaijan	Italy	Mönchengladbach, Germany
Championship 2009	Netherlands	Germany	England	Spain	Ireland	Azerbaijan	Russia	Scotland	Amsterdam, Netherlands
Championship 2007	Germany	Netherlands	Spain	England	Azerbaijan	Ireland	Italy	Ukraine	Manchester, England
Championship 2005	Netherlands	Germany	England	Spain	Ireland	Ukraine	Scotland	France	Dublin, Ireland

==== Championship II ====
Tournament	Gold	Silver	Bronze	4th	5th	6th	7th	8th	Host
Championship 2025	Italy	Wales	Austria	Switzerland	Poland	Czech Republic	Lithuania	Croatia	Gniezno, Poland
Championship 2023	France	Czech Republic	Wales	Ukraine	Poland	Austria	Lithuania	Slovakia	Prague, Czech Republic
Championship 2021	Belarus	France	Poland	Wales	Russia	Czech Republic	Austria	Lithuania	Prague, Czech Republic
Championship 2019	Scotland	Italy	Poland	Austria	Wales	Czech Republic	Ukraine	Turkey	Glasgow, Scotland
Championship 2017	Belarus	Russia	Italy	Wales	Poland	Ukraine	Austria	France	Cardiff, Wales
Championship 2015	Ireland	Czech Republic	Belarus	Azerbaijan	Wales	France	Austria	Ukraine	Prague, Czech Republic
Championship 2013	Italy	Poland	Azerbaijan	France	Austria	Ukraine	Russia	Lithuania	Cambrai, France
Championship 2011	Scotland	Belarus	Russia	France	Ukraine	Poland	Switzerland	Wales	Poznań, Poland
Trophy 2009	Belgium	Italy	Wales	France	Belarus	Ukraine	Poland	Lithuania	Rome, Italy
Trophy 2007	Scotland	Russia	Belgium	Belarus	France	Lithuania	Czech Republic	Austria	Šiauliai, Lithuania
Trophy 2005	Azerbaijan	Italy	Russia	Belgium	Belarus	Lithuania	Wales	Poland	Baku, Azerbaijan

==== Championship III ====
(known as Challenge I until 2011)

Tournament	Gold	Silver	Bronze	4th	5th	6th	7th	8th	Host
Championship 2025	Ukraine	Turkey	Hungary	Luxembourg					Alanya, Türkiye
Championship 2023	Turkey	Switzerland	Gibraltar	Croatia					Zagreb, Croatia
Championship 2021	Ukraine	Switzerland	Turkey	Croatia	Portugal	Slovakia	Slovenia		Lipovci, Slovenia
Championship 2019	France	Lithuania	Switzerland	Croatia	Slovakia	Hungary	Slovenia		Lipovci, Slovenia
Championship 2017	Turkey	Switzerland	Lithuania	Croatia	Slovenia				Sveti Ivan Zelina, Croatia
Championship 2015	Russia	Lithuania	Turkey	Croatia	Switzerland				Sveti Ivan Zelina, Croatia
Championship 2013	Wales	Czech Republic	Switzerland	Turkey	Slovakia	Greece			Athens, Greece
Championship 2011	Lithuania	Austria	Czech Republic	Turkey	Slovakia	Bulgaria			Vienna, Austria
Challenge 2009	Switzerland	Czech Republic	Austria	Slovakia	Georgia				Olten, Switzerland
Challenge 2007	Wales	Poland	Switzerland	Slovakia	Croatia	Turkey	Serbia		Zagreb, Croatia
Challenge 2005	Czech Republic	Austria	Slovakia	Croatia	Switzerland	Bulgaria	Serbia	Turkey	Prague, Czech

== Indoor ==
=== Men ===
==== Championship I ====
See: EuroHockey Indoor Nations Championship

Tournament	Gold	Silver	Bronze	4th	5th	6th	7th	8th	9th	10th	Venue
Challenge 2026	Austria	Poland	Spain	Germany	Belgium	Switzerland	Portugal	Czech Republic	Turkey	Ireland	Heidelberg, Germany
Challenge 2024	Germany	Poland	Belgium	Austria	Spain	Switzerland	Portugal	Czech Republic	Croatia	Ukraine	Leuven, Belgium
Challenge 2022	Austria	Germany	Netherlands	Switzerland	Belgium	Czech Republic					Hamburg, Germany
Challenge 2020	Germany	Austria	Netherlands	Russia	Czech Republic	Belgium	Poland	Ukraine			Berlin, Germany
Challenge 2018	Austria	Belgium	Germany	Poland	Czech Republic	Russia	Switzerland	Denmark			Antwerp, Belgium
Challenge 2016	Germany	Austria	Russia	Czech Republic	Poland	Switzerland	Netherlands	Sweden			Prague, Czech Republic
Challenge 2014	Germany	Austria	Russia	Poland	Netherlands	Czech Republic	Sweden	England			Vienna, Austria
Challenge 2012	Germany	Czech Republic	Austria	Netherlands	Spain	Russia	England	Switzerland			Leipzig, Germany
Challenge 2010	Austria	Russia	Netherlands	Spain	Germany	Czech Republic	Italy	Denmark			Almere, Netherlands
Challenge 2008	Russia	Germany	Austria	Spain	Italy	Czech Republic	Switzerland	Poland			Ekaterinburg, Russia

==== Championship II ====
(Known as Indoor Nations Trophy until 20??)

Tournament	Gold	Silver	Bronze	4th	5th	6th	7th	8th	Venue
Challenge 2022	Spain	Poland	Croatia	Ukraine	Portugal	Turkey	Slovakia		Paredes, Portugal
Challenge 2020	Switzerland	Belarus	Portugal	Croatia	Turkey	Italy	Slovakia	Denmark	Lucerne, Switzerland
Challenge 2018	Netherlands	Ukraine	Sweden	Croatia	Portugal	Italy	Turkey	England	Alanya, Turkey
Challenge 2016	Belgium	Denmark	England	France	Portugal	Ukraine	Croatia	Scotland	Espinho, Portugal
Challenge 2014	France	Switzerland	Ukraine	Denmark	Scotland	Belgium	Slovakia	Belarus	Bern, Switzerland
Challenge 2012	Poland	Sweden	Ukraine	Denmark	Italy	Slovakia	Scotland		Lignano, Italy
Challenge 2010	England	Switzerland	Poland	Sweden	Scotland	Belgium	Slovakia	Portugal	Poznań, Poland
Challenge 2008	Netherlands	Denmark	Slovakia	Portugal	Belgium	Scotland	Ukraine	Hungary	Copenhagen, Denmark

==== Championship III ====
(Known as Challenge I until 20??)

Tournament	Gold	Silver	Bronze	4th	5th	6th	7th	8th	Venue
Challenge 2022	Italy	Denmark	Ireland	Cyprus	Serbia	Greece			Athienou, Cyprus
Challenge 2020	Spain	Scotland	Ireland	Wales	Slovenia				Santander, Spain
Challenge 2018	Belarus	Slovakia	Scotland	Wales	Slovenia	Cyprus	Greece		Nicosia, Cyprus
Challenge 2016	Italy	Turkey	Belarus	Slovakia	Wales	Finland			Vantaa, Finland
Challenge 2014	Portugal	Croatia	Wales	Turkey	Hungary	Finland			Sveti Ivan Zelina, Croatia
Challenge 2012	France	Belgium	Portugal	Croatia	Wales	Turkey	Hungary	Finland	Gondomar, Portugal
Challenge 2010	Ukraine	Croatia	Turkey	Hungary	Greece				Alanya, Turkey
Challenge 2008	Sweden	England	Croatia	Turkey	Finland	Bulgaria			Sheffield, England
Challenge 2006	Belarus	Sweden	Finland	Lithuania	Bulgaria				Sofia, Bulgaria
Challenge 2003	Italy	Belarus	Slovenia	Georgia					Brescia, Italy

==== Championship IV ====
Tournament	Gold	Silver	Bronze	4th	5th	6th	7th	8th	Venue
Challenge 2010	France	Wales	Finland	Norway					Rouen, France

=== Women ===
==== Championship I ====
Tournament	Gold	Silver	Bronze	4th	5th	6th	7th	8th	9th	10th	Venue
Challenge 2026	Germany	Czech Republic	Austria	Spain	Belgium	Ukraine	Switzerland	Poland	Ireland	Lithuania	Prague, Czech Republic
Challenge 2024	Germany	Poland	Austria	Spain	Czech Republic	Belgium	Ukraine	Switzerland	Turkey	Italy	Berlin, Germany
Challenge 2022	Germany	Netherlands	Ukraine	Austria	Czech Republic	Turkey					Hamburg, Germany
Challenge 2020	Belarus	Netherlands	Czech Republic	Germany	Ukraine	Austria	Belgium	Switzerland			Minsk, Belarus
Challenge 2018	Germany	Netherlands	Belarus	Czech Republic	Ukraine	Switzerland	Russia	Poland			Prague, Czech Republic
Challenge 2016	Netherlands	Poland	Belarus	Germany	Ukraine	Czech Republic	Austria	Belgium			Minsk, Belarus
Challenge 2014	Netherlands	Germany	Poland	Austria	Czech Republic	Belgium	England	France			Prague, Czech Republic
Challenge 2012	Germany	Belgium	Poland	Netherlands	Czech Republic	Austria	Spain	Ukraine			Leipzig, Germany

==== Championship II ====
Tournament	Gold	Silver	Bronze	4th	5th	6th	7th	8th	Venue
Challenge 2026	Turkey	Italy	Sweden	Croatia	Slovakia	Portugal	Finland		Lousada, Portugal
Challenge 2024	Ireland	Lithuania	Croatia	Slovakia	Sweden	Portugal			Galway, Ireland
Challenge 2022	Spain	Belgium	Poland	Switzerland	Scotland	Ireland			Ourense, Spain
Challenge 2020	Russia	Turkey	Scotland	Poland	Lithuania	Croatia	Wales		Sveti Ivan Zelina, Croatia
Challenge 2018	Belgium	Austria	England	Croatia	Lithuania	Sweden	Scotland	Wales	Brussels, Belgium
Challenge 2016	Russia	Switzerland	France	Lithuania	England	Scotland	Croatia	Wales	Cambrai, France
Challenge 2014	Ukraine	Belgium	Scotland	Switzerland	Russia	Lithuania	Wales	Slovakia	Šiauliai, Lithuania
Challenge 2012	France	England	Lithuania	Switzerland	Scotland	Slovakia	Denmark	Russia	Slagelse, Denmark

==== Championship III ====
Tournament	Gold	Silver	Bronze	4th	5th	6th	7th	8th	Venue
Challenge 2022	Italy	Slovakia	Portugal						Bratislava, Slovakia
Challenge 2020	Spain	Ireland	Portugal	Slovakia	Denmark	Slovenia	Finland		Bratislava, Slovakia
Challenge 2018	Turkey	Slovakia	Slovenia						Apače, Slovenia
Challenge 2016	Tournament cancelled. Sweden was promoted following a playoff against Turkey								Bolu, Turkey
Challenge 2014	Croatia	Turkey	Sweden	Bulgaria	Portugal				Poreč, Croatia
Challenge 2012	Belgium	Wales	Italy	Sweden	Croatia	Turkey	Portugal		Gondomar, Portugal
Challenge 2010	England	France	Sweden	Croatia	Wales	Turkey			Rouen, France
Challenge 2008	Denmark	England	Turkey	Sweden					Sheffield, England
