= 2023 Women's EuroHockey Championship Qualifiers =

Field hockey tournaments

Tournament details
- Host countries: England; France; Ireland; Lithuania
- Dates: 17–28 August 2022
- Teams: 15 (from 1 confederation)
- Venue: 4 (in 4 host cities)

Tournament statistics
- Matches played: 22
- Goals scored: 108 (4.91 per match)
- Top scorer: (England) Hannah Martin (7 goals)

The 2023 Women's EuroHockey Championship Qualifiers was a series of 4 qualification events for the 2023 EuroHockey Championships in Mönchengladbach. The tournaments were held in England, Ireland, Lithuania and France between 15 and 27 August 2022.

The top team from each tournament qualified for the EuroHockey Championships. The second and third ranked teams from each group advanced to the EuroHockey Championship II, with the remaining teams advancing to the EuroHockey Championship III.

== Qualification ==
All eligible teams from the EuroHockey Championships II and III participated, as well as the four lowest ranked teams from the EuroHockey Championships.

Dates	Event	Location	Quotas	Qualifier(s)
5–13 June 2021	2021 EuroHockey Championship	Amstelveen, Netherlands	4	England; Ireland; Italy; Scotland
1–7 August 2021	2021 EuroHockey Championship III	Lipovci, Slovenia	5	Croatia; Slovakia; ~~Slovenia~~^{[a]} Switzerland; Turkey; Ukraine
15–21 August 2021	2021 EuroHockey Championship II	Prague, Czech Republic	6	Austria; ~~Belarus~~; Czech Republic; France; Lithuania; Poland; ~~Russia~~; Wales
Total			15	

== Qualifier A ==
Qualifier A was held in Durham, England.

Qualifier A
Tournament details
- Host country: England
- City: Durham
- Dates: 25–28 August
- Venue: Maiden Castle Sports Centre

Final positions
- Champions: England
- Runner-up: Wales
- Third place: Slovakia

Tournament statistics
- Matches played: 6
- Goals scored: 50 (8.33 per match)
- Top scorer: (England) Hannah Martin (7 goals)

=== Standings ===
Pos	Team	Pld	W	D	L	GF	GA	GD	Pts	Qualification
1	England (H)	3	3	0	0	29	0	+29	9	2023 EuroHockey Championship
2	Wales	3	2	0	1	17	3	+14	6	2023 EuroHockey Championship II
3	Slovakia	3	0	1	2	2	22	−20	1	2023 EuroHockey Championship II
4	Croatia	3	0	1	2	2	25	−23	1	2023 EuroHockey Championship III

Source: FIH
Rules for classification: 1) points; 2) matches won; 3) goal difference; 4) goals for; 5) head-to-head result; 6) field goals for.
(H) Hosts

=== Results ===
25 August 2022
17:15

Wales	9–0	Slovakia
Laity 6'; Webb 7', 13'; Hughes 10', 49'; Westwood 19'; Goodman 41'; Wilkinson 52'; Howell 56'	Report

Umpires:
Alison Keogh (IRE)
Magali Sergeant (BEL)

25 August 2022
19:30

England	15–0	Croatia
Martin 5', 14', 30', 34'; Balsdon 9'; Howard 12', 45'; Ansley 15', 29'; Hamilton 22'; Rayer 31', 35'; Petter 33'; Owsley 37'; Toman 55'	Report

Umpires:
Vilma Bagdanskienė (LTU)
Gema Calderón (ESP)

27 August 2022
10:45

Croatia	2–2	Slovakia
Petretić 22', 26'	Report	Ristová 15'; Chebenova 45'

Umpires:
Gema Calderón (ESP)
Alison Keogh (IRE)

27 August 2022
13:00

Wales	0–3	England
	Report	Balsdon 23'; Howard 42'; Martin 57'

Umpires:
Lorijn de Kraker (NED)
Vilma Bagdanskienė (LTU)

28 August 2022
10:45

Croatia	0–8	Wales
	Report	Wilkinson 2'; French 13'; Munro 17'; Jones 19'; Hughes 20'; Hoskins 38', 52'; Goodman 58'

Umpires:
Lorijn de Kraker (NED)
Alison Keogh (IRE)

28 August 2022
13:00

England	11–0	Slovakia
Howard 4'; Peel 14'; Owsley 19'; Hamilton 20', 49'; Martin 23', 56'; Rayer 35'; Balsdon 36'; Crackles 40'; Pearne-Webb 58'	Report

Umpires:
Magali Sergeant (BEL)
Gema Calderón (ESP)

== Qualifier B ==
Qualifier B was held in Dublin, Ireland.

Qualifier B
Tournament details
- Host country: Ireland
- City: Dublin
- Dates: 18–21 August
- Teams: 4
- Venue: National Sports Campus

Final positions
- Champions: Ireland
- Runner-up: Czech Republic
- Third place: Poland

Tournament statistics
- Matches played: 6
- Goals scored: 16 (2.67 per match)
- Top scorer: (Ireland) Róisín Upton (3 goals)

=== Standings ===
Pos	Team	Pld	W	D	L	GF	GA	GD	Pts	Qualification
1	Ireland (H)	3	3	0	0	11	0	+11	9	2023 EuroHockey Championship
2	Czech Republic	3	1	1	1	2	2	0	4	2023 EuroHockey Championship II
3	Poland	3	1	0	2	2	4	−2	3	2023 EuroHockey Championship II
4	Turkey	3	0	1	2	1	10	−9	1	2023 EuroHockey Championship III

Source: FIH
Rules for classification: 1) points; 2) matches won; 3) goal difference; 4) goals for; 5) head-to-head result; 6) field goals for.
(H) Hosts

=== Results ===
18 August 2022
17:15

Czech Republic	1–1	Turkey
Mejzlíková 55'	Report	Kucukkoc 36'

Umpires:
Laurine Delforge (BEL)
Caroline Ellice (SCO)

18 August 2022
19:30

Ireland	3–0	Poland
Duke 19'; Upton 23', 59'	Report

Umpires:
Rebecca Woodcock (ENG)
Ilaria Amorosini (ITA)

20 August 2022
10:45

Poland	2–0	Turkey
Drozda 2'; Rybacha 32'	Report

Umpires:
Laurine Delforge (BEL)
Clare Barwood (WAL)

20 August 2022
13:00

Czech Republic	0–1	Ireland
	Report	Mullan 21'

Umpires:
Caroline Ellice (SCO)
Rebecca Woodcock (ENG)

21 August 2022
10:45

Poland	0–1	Czech Republic
	Report	Šmídová 24'

Umpires:
Laurine Delforge (BEL)
Ilaria Amorosini (ITA)

21 August 2022
13:00

Ireland	7–0	Turkey
M. Carey 16'; Carroll 18'; McKee 24'; N. Carey 31'; Duke 34'; Upton 44'; Hawkshaw 54'	Report

Umpires:
Rebecca Woodcock (ENG)
Clare Barwood (WAL)

== Qualifier C ==
Qualifier C was held in Vilnius, Lithuania.

Qualifier C
Tournament details
- Host country: Lithuania
- City: Vilnius
- Dates: 17–20 August
- Teams: 3 (from 1 confederation)
- Venue: Vilnius Žemynos

Final positions
- Champions: Italy
- Runner-up: Ukraine
- Third place: Lithuania

Tournament statistics
- Matches played: 4
- Goals scored: 21 (5.25 per match)
- Top scorer(s): (Italy) Pilar De Biase (Italy) Sofía Laurito (Italy) Agueda Moroni (3 goals)

=== Preliminary round ===
Pos	Team	Pld	W	D	L	GF	GA	GD	Pts	Qualification
1	Italy	2	2	0	0	16	1	+15	6	Final
2	Ukraine	2	1	0	1	4	7	−3	3	Final
3	Lithuania (H)	2	0	0	2	0	12	−12	0	2023 EuroHockey Championship II

Source: FIH
Rules for classification: 1) points; 2) matches won; 3) goal difference; 4) goals for; 5) head-to-head result; 6) field goals for.
(H) Hosts

17 August 2022
18:15

Italy	9–0	Lithuania
Pastor 13'; De Biase 25'; Carta 28'; Moroni 38', 60'; Laurito 39', 48'; A. Oviedo 45'; Machín 48'	Report

Umpires:
Sophie Bockelmann (GER)
Elizabeth Clifford (IRE)

18 August 2022
16:00

Ukraine	1–7	Italy
Leonova 57'	Report	Pessina 5'; Moroni 25'; Carta 37'; Maldonado 44'; De Biase 49', 60'; Laurito 60'

Umpires:
Toni-Lee Lambert (WAL)
Céline Martin-Schmets (BEL)

19 August 2022
14:00

Lithuania	0–3	Ukraine
	Report	Moroz 24'; Ponomarenko 35'; Leonova 57'

Umpires:
Elizabeth Clifford (IRE)
Toni-Lee Lambert (WAL)

=== Final ===
20 August 2022
12:00

Italy	1–0	Ukraine
Machín 30'	Report

Umpires:
Céline Martin-Schmets (BEL)
Sophie Bockelmann (GER)

=== Final standings ===
Pos	Team	Qualification
1	Italy	2023 EuroHockey Championship
2	Ukraine	2023 EuroHockey Championship II
3	Lithuania (H)	2023 EuroHockey Championship II

Source: FIH
(H) Host

== Qualifier D ==
Qualifier D was held in Dunkirk, France.

Qualifier D
Tournament details
- Host country: France
- City: Dunkirk
- Dates: 24–27 August

Final positions
- Champions: Scotland
- Runner-up: France
- Third place: Austria

Tournament statistics
- Matches played: 6
- Goals scored: 21 (3.5 per match)
- Top scorer: (Scotland) Fiona Burnet (3 goals)

=== Standings ===
Pos	Team	Pld	W	D	L	GF	GA	GD	Pts	Qualification
1	Scotland	3	3	0	0	10	2	+8	9	2023 EuroHockey Championship
2	France (H)	3	2	0	1	6	2	+4	6	2023 EuroHockey Championship II
3	Austria	3	1	0	2	3	8	−5	3	2023 EuroHockey Championship II
4	Switzerland	3	0	0	3	2	9	−7	0	2023 EuroHockey Championship III

Source: FIH
Rules for classification: 1) points; 2) matches won; 3) goal difference; 4) goals for; 5) head-to-head result; 6) field goals for.
(H) Hosts

=== Results ===
24 August 2022
16:00

France	2–0	Switzerland
Lhopital 24'; Verzura 43'	Report

Umpires:
Sandra Adell (ESP)
Katie Howie (SCO)

24 August 2022
18:15

Scotland	4–0	Austria
Costello 3'; Eadie 9'; Burnet 26'; Jamieson 46'	Report

Umpires:
Kamile Mockaitytė (LTU)
Ellie Duffy (IRE)

25 August 2022
17:00

France	0–2	Scotland
	Report	Burnet 35'; McEwan 45'

Umpires:
Rachel Williams (ENG)
Sandra Adell (ESP)

26 August 2022
13:00

Austria	3–0	Switzerland
Proksch 9'; Laginja 39', 47'	Report

Umpires:
Katie Howie (SCO)
Rachel Williams (ENG)

27 August 2022
10:30

Scotland	4–2	Switzerland
Burnet 17'; Shields 28'; McEwan 29'; Jamieson 30'	Report	Fontana 44'; Triebold 46'

Umpires:
Sandra Adell (ESP)
Kamile Mockaitytė (LTU)

27 August 2022
12:45

Austria	0–4	France
	Report	Lhopital 10'; Gaspari 24'; Arnaud 52'; Varoqui 52'

Umpires:
Ellie Duffy (IRE)
Rachel Williams (ENG)

== Goalscorers ==
There were 108 goals scored in 22 matches, for an average of 4.91 goals per match.

7 goals

- (England) Hannah Martin

4 goals

- (England) Tessa Howard

3 goals

- (England) Grace Balsdon
- (England) Sophie Hamilton
- (England) Elena Rayer
- (Ireland) Róisín Upton
- (Italy) Pilar De Biase
- (Italy) Sofía Laurito
- (Italy) Agueda Moroni
- (Scotland) Fiona Burnet
- (Wales) Xenna Hughes

2 goals

- (Austria) Marta Laginja
- (Croatia) Martina Petretić
- (England) Giselle Ansley
- (England) Lily Owsley
- (France) Yohanna Lhopital
- (Ireland) Deirdre Duke
- (Italy) Federica Carta
- (Italy) Camila Machín
- (Scotland) Sarah Jamieson
- (Scotland) Heather McEwan
- (Ukraine) Karyna Leonova
- (Wales) Madeleine Goodman
- (Wales) Olivia Hoskins
- (Wales) Isobel Webb
- (Wales) Leah Wilkinson

1 goal

- (Austria) Katharina Proksch
- (Czech Republic) Tereza Mejzlíková
- (Czech Republic) Magdalena Šmídová
- (England) Fiona Crackles
- (England) Hollie Pearne-Webb
- (England) Flora Peel
- (England) Isabelle Petter
- (England) Anna Toman
- (France) Victoire Arnaud
- (France) Delfina Gaspari
- (France) Paulina Varoqui
- (France) Eve Verzura
- (Ireland) Michelle Carey
- (Ireland) Niamh Carey
- (Ireland) Naomi Carroll
- (Ireland) Sarah Hawkshaw
- (Ireland) Katie McKee
- (Ireland) Kathryn Mullan
- (Italy) Sofía Maldonado
- (Italy) Ailin Oviedo
- (Italy) Mercedes Pastor
- (Italy) Ivanna Pessina
- (Poland) Maria Drozda
- (Poland) Marlena Rybacha
- (Turkey) Perihan Kucukkoc
- (Ukraine) Yebheniia Moroz
- (Ukraine) Oksana Ponomarenko
- (Scotland) Amy Costello
- (Scotland) Jennifer Eadie
- (Scotland) Bronwyn Shields
- (Slovakia) Dominika Chebenova
- (Slovakia) Michaela Ristová
- (Switzerland) Sae Fontana
- (Switzerland) Raffaela Triebold
- (Wales) Sian French
- (Wales) Isabelle Howell
- (Wales) Sarah Jones
- (Wales) Eloise Laity
- (Wales) Holly Munro
- (Wales) Joanne Westwood

Source: FIH

== See also ==
- 2023 Men's EuroHockey Championship Qualifiers
