= Women's EuroHockey Championship III =

- Most recent season or competition: 2025 Women's EuroHockey Championship III
- Formerly: Women's EuroHockey Nations Challenge I
- Sport: Field hockey
- Founded: 2005; 21 years ago
- First season: 2005
- No. of teams: 8
- Confederation: EHF (Europe)
- Most recent champion: Ukraine (2nd title) (2025)
- Most titles: Turkey; Ukraine; Wales (2 titles each)
- Level on pyramid: 3

The Women's EuroHockey Championship III, formerly known as the Women's EuroHockey Nations Challenge I, is a competition for European women's national field hockey teams. It is the third level of European field hockey Championships for national women's teams.

The tournament has been won by eight different teams: Wales, Ukraine and Turkey have the most titles with two and the Czech Republic, France, Lithuania, Russia and Switzerland have all won the tournament once. The most recent edition was held in Alanya, Turkey and was won by Ukraine.\

== Results ==
Year	Host	Final			Third place match			Number of teams
Year	Host	Winner	Score	Runner-up	Third place	Score	Fourth place	Number of teams
2005; Details	Prague, Czech Republic	Czech Republic	3–2	Austria	Slovakia	3–2	Croatia	8
2007; Details	Zagreb, Croatia	Wales	2–2 (a.e.t.) (2–0 p.s.)	Poland	Switzerland	1–0	Slovakia	7
2009; Details	Olten, Switzerland	Switzerland	2–0	Czech Republic	Austria	2–0	Slovakia	5
2011; Details	Vienna, Austria	Lithuania	Round-robin	Austria	Czech Republic	Round-robin	Turkey	6
2013; Details	Athens, Greece	Wales	Round-robin	Czech Republic	Switzerland	Round-robin	Turkey	6
2015; Details	Sveti Ivan Zelina, Croatia	Russia	Round-robin	Lithuania	Turkey	Round-robin	Croatia	5
2017; Details	Sveti Ivan Zelina, Croatia	Turkey	2–1	Switzerland	Lithuania	6–1	Croatia	5
2019; Details	Lipovci, Slovenia	France	4–3	Lithuania	Switzerland	0–0 (2–1 s.o.)	Croatia	7
2021; Details	Lipovci, Slovenia	Ukraine	2–1	Switzerland	Turkey	3–0	Croatia	7
2023; Details	Zagreb, Croatia	Turkey	3–1	Switzerland	Gibraltar	2–1	Croatia	4
2025; Details	Alanya, Turkey	Ukraine	10–1	Turkey	Hungary	2–1	Luxembourg	4

=== Summary ===
Team	Winners	Runners-up	Third place	Fourth place
Turkey	2 (2017, 2023)	1 (2025*)	2 (2015, 2021)	2 (2011, 2013)
Wales	2 (2007, 2013)			
Ukraine	2 (2021, 2025)			
Switzerland	1 (2009*)	3 (2017, 2021, 2023)	3 (2007, 2013, 2019)	
Czech Republic	1 (2005*)	2 (2009, 2013)	1 (2011)	
Lithuania	1 (2011)	2 (2015, 2019)	1 (2017)	
France	1 (2019)			
Russia	1 (2015)			
Austria		2 (2005, 2011*)	1 (2009)	
Poland		1 (2007)		
Slovakia			1 (2005)	2 (2007, 2009)
Gibraltar			1 (2023)	
Hungary			1 (2025)	
Croatia				6 (2005, 2015*, 2017*, 2019, 2021, 2023*)
Luxembourg				1 (2025)

* = host nation

=== Team appearances ===
Team	(Czech Republic) 2005	(Croatia) 2007	(Switzerland) 2009	(Austria) 2011	(Greece) 2013	(Croatia) 2015	(Croatia) 2017	(Slovenia) 2019	(Slovenia) 2021	(Croatia) 2023	(Turkey) 2025	Total
Austria	2nd	–	3rd	2nd	–	–	–	–	–	–	–	3
Bulgaria	6th	–	–	6th	–	–	–	–	–	–	–	2
Croatia	4th	5th	–	–	–	4th	4th	4th	4th	4th	–	7
Czech Republic	1st	–	2nd	3rd	2nd	–	–	–	–	–	–	4
France	–	–	–	–	–	–	–	1st	–	–	–	1
Georgia	–	–	5th	–	–	–	–	–	–	–	–	1
Gibraltar	–	–	–	–	–	–	–	–	–	3rd	WD	1
Greece	–	–	–	–	6th	–	–	–	–	–	–	1
Hungary	–	–	–	–	–	–	–	6th	–	–	3rd	2
Lithuania	–	–	–	1st	–	2nd	3rd	2nd	–	–	–	4
Luxembourg	–	–	–	–	–	–	–	–	–	–	4th	1
Poland	–	2nd	–	–	–	–	–	–	–	–	–	1
Portugal	–	–	–	–	–	–	–	–	5th	–	–	1
Russia	–	–	–	–	–	1st	–	–	–	–	–	1
Serbia	–	7th	–	–	–	–	–	–	–	–	–	1
Serbia and Montenegro	7th	Defunct										1
Slovenia	–	–	–	–	–	–	5th	7th	7th	–	–	3
Slovakia	3rd	4th	4th	5th	5th	–	–	5th	6th	–	–	7
Switzerland	5th	3rd	1st	–	3rd	5th	2nd	3rd	2nd	2nd	–	9
Turkey	8th	6th	–	4th	4th	3rd	1st	–	3rd	1st	2nd	9
Ukraine	–	–	–	–	–	–	–	–	1st	–	1st	2
Wales	–	1st	–	–	1st	–	–	–	–	–	–	2
Total	8	7	5	6	6	5	5	7	7	4	4	

== See also ==
- Men's EuroHockey Championship III
- Women's EuroHockey Championship II
