= 2021 Women's EuroHockey Championship III =

Ninth edition of the Women's EuroHockey Championship III

Tournament details
- Host country: Slovenia
- City: Lipovci
- Dates: 1–7 August
- Teams: 7 (from 1 confederation)
- Venue: HC Lipovci

Final positions
- Champions: Ukraine (1st title)
- Runner-up: Switzerland
- Third place: Turkey

Tournament statistics
- Matches played: 15
- Goals scored: 89 (5.93 per match)
- Top scorer: (Turkey) Fatma Songül Gültekin (13 goals)

The 2021 Women's EuroHockey Championship III was the ninth edition of the Women's EuroHockey Championship III, the third level of the women's European field hockey championships organized by the European Hockey Federation. It was held from 1 to 7 August 2021 at HC Lipovci in Lipovci, Slovenia.

Ukraine won their first EuroHockey Championship III title by defeating Switzerland 2–1 in the final. Turkey won the bronze medal by defeating Croatia 3–0.

== Qualified teams ==
Participating nations have qualified based on their final ranking from the 2019 competition.

Dates	Event	Location	Quotas	Qualifier(s)
4–10 August 2019	2019 EuroHockey Championship II	Glasgow, Scotland	2	Turkey (32); Ukraine (27)
28 July – 3 August 2019	2019 EuroHockey Championship III	Lipovci, Slovenia	4	Croatia (43); ~~Hungary~~ (Note: Finland and Hungary withdrew.); Slovakia (50); Slovenia (48); Switzerland (38)
26 March 2020	New entry	—N/a	1	~~Finland (–)~~; Portugal
Total			7	

== Umpires ==
The following eight umpires were appointed for the tournament by the EHF:

- Fiona Davitt (IRL)
- Pauline Cuypers (BEL)
- Serap Kara (TUR)
- Thalia Bellemans (BEL)
- Nadine Schuschel (GER)
- Lizelotte Wolter (NED)
- Yelizaveta Yakovenko (UKR)
- Manouk Bakker (NED)

== Preliminary round ==
=== Pool A ===
Pos	Team	Pld	W	D	L	GF	GA	GD	Pts	Qualification
1	Ukraine	2	2	0	0	24	0	+24	6	Semi-finals
2	Croatia	2	1	0	1	6	10	−4	3	Semi-finals
3	Slovenia (H)	2	0	0	2	0	20	−20	0	

Source: FIH
Rules for classification: 1) points; 2) matches won; 3) goal difference; 4) goals for; 5) head-to-head result; 6) field goals for.
(H) Hosts

2 August 2021 (Note: The match was originally scheduled for 1 August 2021 at 17:00 but due to thunderstorms and torrential rain, the match was re-scheduled to 2 August at 12:30.)
12:30

Ukraine	14–0	Slovenia
Shevchenko 3', 7', 24', 36', 55'; Kernoz 23'; Leonova 26', 46', 49', 55'; O. Kurovska 30', 37'; Ponomarenko 45'; Honcharenko 57'	Report

Umpires:
Thalia Bellemans (BEL)
Manouk Bakker (NED)

3 August 2021
17:00

Croatia	0–10	Ukraine
	Report	Shevchenko 1', 28', 45'; Voievoda 14', 28'; Moroz 20'; Leonova 32'; Shokalenko 43'; A. Kurovska 47'; Rudychenko 60'

Umpires:
Manouk Bakker (NED)
Nadine Schuschel (GER)

4 August 2021
17:00

Slovenia	0–6	Croatia
	Report	Hrupec 34', 40', 52'; Litvic 34'; Lagančić 44'; Nizek 58'

Umpires:
Yelizaveta Yakovenko (UKR)
Lizelotte Wolter (NED)

=== Pool B ===
Pos	Team	Pld	W	D	L	GF	GA	GD	Pts	Qualification
1	Switzerland	3	3	0	0	11	2	+9	9	Semi-finals
2	Turkey	3	2	0	1	17	3	+14	6	Semi-finals
3	Portugal	3	1	0	2	6	8	−2	3	
4	Slovakia	3	0	0	3	1	22	−21	0	

Source: FIH
Rules for classification: 1) points; 2) matches won; 3) goal difference; 4) goals for; 5) head-to-head result; 6) field goals for.

1 August 2021
12:30

Turkey	9–0	Slovakia
Gültekin 7', 23', 26', 40', 58'; Kurt 12'; Paksoy 38'; Oymak 40'; Çelik 48'	Report

Umpires:
Pauline Cuypers (BEL)
Yelizaveta Yakovenko (UKR)

1 August 2021 (Note: In the tenth minute the match was interrupted and suspended due to thunderstorms and torrential rain. The match will be resumed on 3 August at 14.45 hrs.)
14:45

Switzerland	1–0	Portugal
E. Trösch 25'	Report

Umpires:
Lizelotte Wolter (NED)
Serap Kara (TUR)

2 August 2021
14:45

Slovakia	1–6	Portugal
Vyskoçová 43'	Report	Fidalgo 1'; Bruce 11', 30'; Ledesma 12', 33', 39'

Umpires:
Nadine Schuschel (GER)
Fiona Davitt (IRL)

2 August 2021
17:00

Switzerland	3–2	Turkey
Stomps 12'; E. Trösch 16'; Pöhler 56'	Report	Gültekin 4', 40'

Umpires:
Lizelotte Wolter (NED)
Pauline Cuypers (BEL)

4 August 2021
12:30

Turkey	6–0	Portugal
Gültekin 15', 16', 29', 38'; Bahçivan 36'; Güzelal 55'	Report

Umpires:
Thalia Bellemans (BEL)
Pauline Cuypers (BEL)

4 August 2021
14:45

Slovakia	0–7	Switzerland
	Report	T. Trösch 6'; Pöhler 32'; Thoma 39'; Zimmermann 42', 43'; Weber 46'; Stomps 48'

Umpires:
Serap Kara (TUR)
Fiona Davitt (IRL)

== Fifth to seventh place classification ==
=== Pool C ===
The points obtained in the preliminary round against the other team are taken over.

Pos	Team	Pld	W	D	L	GF	GA	GD	Pts
5	Portugal	2	2	0	0	12	1	+11	6
6	Slovakia	2	1	0	1	5	6	−1	3
7	Slovenia (H)	2	0	0	2	0	10	−10	0

Source: FIH
Rules for classification: 1) points; 2) matches won; 3) goal difference; 4) goals for; 5) head-to-head result; 6) field goals for.
(H) Hosts

6 August 2021
11:30

Slovenia	0–6	Portugal
	Report	Sousa 5'; Fidalgo 41'; Ledesma 45'; Nunes 48'; I. Oliveira 55'; F. Oliveira 59'

Umpires:
Pauline Cuypers (BEL)
Manouk Bakker (NED)

7 August 2021
10:15

Slovenia	0–4	Slovakia
	Report	Čapová 2'; Vyskočová 22'; Zavodska 30'; Fondrkova 56'

Umpires:
Yelizaveta Yakovenko (UKR)
Thalia Bellemans (BEL)

== First to fourth place classification ==
=== Bracket ===
Semi-finals
6 August
Ukraine	3
Turkey	1
6 August
Switzerland	4
Croatia	0

Final
7 August
Ukraine	2
Switzerland	1
Third place
7 August
Turkey	3
Croatia	0

=== Semi-finals ===
6 August 2021
13:45

Ukraine	3–1	Turkey
Kernoz 15'; Leonova 32'; Ponomarenko 57'	Report	Taşkiran 54'

Umpires:
Nadine Schuschel (GER)
Lizelotte Wolter (NED)

6 August 2021
16:00

Switzerland	4–0	Croatia
Müller 19'; Stomps 45'; Zimmermann 48'; Zbinden 54'	Report

Umpires:
Serap Kara (TUR)
Thalia Bellemans (BEL)

=== Third place game ===
7 August 2021
12:45

Turkey	3–0	Croatia
Gültekin 20', 33'; Esen 22'	Report

Umpires:
Manouk Bakker (NED)
Fiona Davitt (IRL)

=== Final ===
7 August 2021
15:00

Ukraine	2–1	Switzerland
Kernoz 1'; Shevchenko 40'	Report	Thoma 57'

Umpires:
Nadine Schuschel (GER)
Lizelotte Wolter (NED)

== Statistics ==
=== Final standings ===
Rank	Team
1st place, gold medalist(s)	Ukraine
2nd place, silver medalist(s)	Switzerland
3rd place, bronze medalist(s)	Turkey
4	Croatia
5	Portugal
6	Slovakia
7	Slovenia

Qualified for the Women's EuroHockey Championship II

=== Goalscorers ===
There were 89 goals scored in 15 matches, for an average of 5.93 goals per match.

13 goals

- (Turkey) Fatma Songül Gültekin

9 goals

- (Ukraine) Yuliia Shevchenko

6 goals

- (Ukraine) Karyna Leonova

4 goals

- (Portugal) Mariana Ledesma

3 goals

- (Croatia) Petra Hrupec
- (Switzerland) Sofie Stomps
- (Switzerland) Carina Zimmermann
- (Ukraine) Yevheniya Kernoz

2 goals

- (Portugal) Sónia Bruce
- (Portugal) Claudia Fidalgo
- (Slovakia) Karolína Vyskočová
- (Switzerland) Nele Pöhler
- (Switzerland) Janice Thoma
- (Switzerland) Elena Trösch
- (Ukraine) Olha Kurovska
- (Ukraine) Oksana Ponomarenko
- (Ukraine) Anastasiia Voievoda

1 goal

- (Croatia) Dora Lagančić
- (Croatia) Una Litvic
- (Croatia) Lucija Nizek
- (Portugal) Daniela Nunes
- (Portugal) Flávia Oliveira
- (Portugal) Irina Oliveira
- (Portugal) Katarina Sousa
- (Slovakia) Natalia Fondrkova
- (Slovakia) Dominika Zavodska
- (Slovakia) Venessa Čapová
- (Switzerland) Ria Müller
- (Switzerland) Tamara Trösch
- (Switzerland) Stephanie Weber
- (Switzerland) Sara Zbinden
- (Turkey) Emine Bahçivan
- (Turkey) Ayla Esen
- (Turkey) Kübra Güzelal
- (Turkey) Sudenur Kurt
- (Turkey) Meryem Oymak
- (Turkey) Gülcan Paksoy
- (Turkey) İlayda Taşkiran
- (Turkey) Yeter Çelik
- (Ukraine) Olha Honcharenko
- (Ukraine) Anna Kurovska
- (Ukraine) Yevheniia Moroz
- (Ukraine) Valeriia Rudychenko
- (Ukraine) Kateryna Shokalenko

Source: FIH

== See also ==
- 2021 Men's EuroHockey Championship III
- 2021 Women's EuroHockey Championship II
