= 2026 Women's EuroHockey Championship Qualifier I =

Field hockey tournament qualification

Women's EuroHockey Championship Qualifier I
Tournament details
- Host country: Czech Republic
- City: Prague
- Dates: 9–12 July
- Teams: 8 (from 1 confederation)

Final positions
- Champions: Austria
- Runner-up: Ukraine
- Third place: Poland

Tournament statistics
- Matches played: 12
- Goals scored: 40 (3.33 per match)
- Top scorer: (Switzerland) Sofie Stomps (5 goals)
- Best player: (Ukraine) Karyna Leonova
- Best goalkeeper: (Lithuania) Luka Žiaubrytė

The 2026 Women's EuroHockey Championship Qualifier I was a qualification event for the 2027 Women's EuroHockey Championship in London, England. Qualifier I was held in Prague, Czech Republic from 9 to 12 July 2026.

The winners Austria qualified for the EuroHockey Championship for the first time since 1991, while runners-up Ukraine qualified for the first time since 2007.

== Qualification ==
All teams not already qualified directly for the 2027 Women's EuroHockey Championship were eligible to play in the Qualifiers. Teams qualified for the Qualifier I based on their performance in the 2025 EuroHockey Championships.

The following eight teams qualified for the Qualifier I.

Dates	Event	Location	Quotas	Qualifiers
27 July – 2 August 2025	2025 EuroHockey Championship II	Gniezno, Poland	6	Austria; Switzerland; Poland; Czech Republic; Lithuania; Croatia
29 July – 2 August 2025	2025 EuroHockey Championship III	Alanya, Turkey	2	Ukraine; Turkey
Total			8	

== Results ==
=== Bracket ===
Quarter-finals
9 July
Switzerland	1
Ukraine	3
9 July
Poland	3
Croatia	0
9 July
Austria	5
Turkey	1
9 July
Czech Republic	1
Lithuania	0

Semi-finals
11 July
Ukraine	2
Poland	1
11 July
Austria	1
Czech Republic	0

Final
12 July
Ukraine	2
Austria	3
Third place
12 July
Poland	1
Czech Republic	0

=== Quarter-finals ===
9 July 2026
11:00

Switzerland	1–3	Ukraine
Stomps 23'	Report	Honcharenko 2'; Leonova 6', 49'

Umpires:
Sandra Adell (ESP)
Clare Barwood (WAL)

9 July 2026
13:15

Poland	3–0	Croatia
Rymer 3'; Kucharska 34'; Zimmermann 35'	Report

Umpires:
Lizelotte Wolter (NED)
Ilaria Amorosini (ITA)

9 July 2026
15:30

Austria	5–1	Turkey
Proksch 36'; Pultar 41'; Hahnenkamp 43'; Haselsteiner 46'; Kern 56'	Report	Okumuş 17'

Umpires:
Rebecca Edwards (ENG)
Kamile Mockaityte (LTU)

9 July 2026
17:45

Czech Republic	1–0	Lithuania
Hájková 52'	Report

Umpires:
Ivona Makar (CRO)
Manouk Bakker (NED)

=== Fifth to eighth place classification ===
Cross-overs
10 July
Switzerland	7
Croatia	0
10 July
Turkey	0
Lithuania	2

Fifth place
12 July
Switzerland	3
Lithuania	2
Seventh place
12 July
Croatia	0
Turkey	2

==== Cross-overs ====
10 July 2026
15:30

Switzerland	7–0	Croatia
Stomps 8', 55'; Trösch 12', 48'; Härtsch 17'; Pöhler 31'; Hipp 58'	Report

Umpires:
Kamile Mockaityte (LTU)
Manouk Bakker (NED)

10 July 2026
17:45

Turkey	0–2	Lithuania
	Report	Soto 7'; Jakovleva 51'

Umpires:
Clare Barwood (WAL)
Ilaria Amorosini (ITA)

==== Seventh and eighth place ====
12 July 2026
09:15

Croatia	0–2	Turkey
	Report	Satilmiş 45', 58'

Umpires:
Ilaria Amorosini (ITA)
Lizelotte Wolter (NED)

==== Fifth and sixth place ====
12 July 2026
11:30

Switzerland	3–2	Lithuania
Trösch 13'; Stomps 23', 32'	Report	Juraitė 35'; Soto 36'

Umpires:
Ivona Makar (CRO)
Clare Barwood (WAL)

=== First to fourth place classification ===
==== Semi-finals ====
11 July 2026
13:00

Ukraine	2–1	Poland
Basanets 37'; Honcharenko 45'	Report	Wochna 35'

Umpires:
Ivona Makar (CRO)
Rebecca Edwards (ENG)

11 July 2026
15:15

Austria	1–0	Czech Republic
Czech 11'	Report

Umpires:
Sandra Adell (ESP)
Lizelotte Wolter (NED)

==== Third and fourth place ====
12 July 2026
13:45

Poland	1–0	Czech Republic
Pabiniak 15'	Report

Umpires:
Kamile Mockaityte (LTU)
Sandra Adell (ESP)

==== Final ====
12 July 2026
16:00

Ukraine	2–3	Austria
Korobkina 4'; Leonova 15'	Report	Buchleitner 13'; Czech 58'; Buchta 59'

Umpires:
Rebecca Edwards (ENG)
Manouk Bakker (NED)

== Final standings ==
Pos	Team	Qualification
1st place, gold medalist(s)	Austria	2027 Women's EuroHockey Championship
2nd place, silver medalist(s)	Ukraine	2027 Women's EuroHockey Championship
3rd place, bronze medalist(s)	Poland	
4	Czech Republic	
5	Switzerland	
6	Lithuania	
7	Turkey	
8	Croatia	

Source: FIH

== Goalscorers ==
There were 40 goals scored in 12 matches, for an average of 3.33 goals per match.

5 goals

- (Switzerland) Sofie Stomps

3 goals

- (Ukraine) Karyna Leonova

2 goals

- (Austria) Johanna Czech
- (Lithuania) Denise Soto
- (Switzerland) Elena Trösch
- (Turkey) Aleyna Satilmiş
- (Ukraine) Olha Honcharenko

1 goal

- (Austria) Johanna Buchleitner
- (Austria) Daria Buchta
- (Austria) Marie Hahnenkamp
- (Austria) Anja Haselsteiner
- (Austria) Laura Kern
- (Austria) Katharina Proksch
- (Austria) Marianne Pultar
- (Czech Republic) Natálie Hájková
- (Lithuania) Samanta Jakovleva
- (Lithuania) Dovilė Juraitė
- (Poland) Julia Kucharska
- (Poland) Julia Rymer
- (Poland) Hanna Wochna
- (Poland) Magdalena Pabiniak
- (Poland) Viktoria Zimmermann
- (Switzerland) Tamara Trösch
- (Switzerland) Dunja Härtsch
- (Switzerland) Nele Pöhler
- (Switzerland) Tessa Hipp
- (Turkey) Yeter Okumuş
- (Ukraine) Sofiia Basanets
- (Ukraine) Veronika Korobkina

Source: FIH

== See also ==
- 2026 Women's EuroHockey Championship Qualifier II
- 2027 Men's EuroHockey Championship Qualifiers
