= 2017 Men's EuroHockey Championship IV =

Field hockey tournament

Tournament details
- Host country: Slovenia
- City: Lipovci
- Dates: 31 July – 5 August
- Teams: 5 (from 1 confederation)
- Venue: HC Lipovci

Final positions
- Champions: Gibraltar (2nd title)
- Runner-up: Slovenia
- Third place: Hungary

Tournament statistics
- Matches played: 10
- Goals scored: 67 (6.7 per match)
- Top scorer(s): (Gibraltar) Julian Lopez (Gibraltar) Ian Rodriguez (6 goals)

The 2017 Men's EuroHockey Championship IV was the seventh edition of EuroHockey Championship IV, the fourth tier of the European field hockey championships organized by the European Hockey Federation. It was held from 31 July until 5 August 2017 in Lipovci, Slovenia.

Gibraltar won the tournament by finishing top in the round robin tournament and they secured a place in the 2019 EuroHockey Championship III.

== Teams ==
The following five teams shown with pre-tournament world rankings competed in the tournament.

- Cyprus (57)
- Finland (75)
- Gibraltar (73)
- Hungary (68)
- Slovenia (–)

== Results ==
=== Pool ===
Pos	Team	Pld	W	D	L	GF	GA	GD	Pts	Promotion
1	Gibraltar (P)	4	4	0	0	32	5	+27	12	EuroHockey Championship III
2	Slovenia (H)	4	3	0	1	14	11	+3	9	
3	Hungary	4	2	0	2	10	13	−3	6	
4	Cyprus	4	1	0	3	5	18	−13	3	
5	Finland	4	0	0	4	6	20	−14	0	

Source: FIH
Rules for classification: 1) points; 2) goal difference; 3) goals scored; 4) head-to-head result.
(H) Hosts; (P) Promoted

=== Matches ===
All times are local, CEST (UTC+2).

31 July 2017
15:45

Hungary	4–3	Finland
Ficzere 22'; Leber 30+'; Chorle 42'; Suba 48'	Report	Hirvioja 36'; Makela 51'; Fiskaali 58'

Umpires:
Oliver Tarnoczi (AUT)
Ivan Grgurev (CRO)

31 July 2017
18:00

Gibraltar	7–2	Slovenia
Lima 8', 12', 21'; Stagno 13'; Cerisola 30'; Lopez 37'; Rodriguez 44'	Report	R. Mesarič 34'; Vegič 38'

Umpires:
Tamas Hermann (HUN)
Christian Gibson (FIN)

1 August 2017
15:45

Gibraltar	8–1	Finland
Stagno 15', 25', 51'; Rodriguez 33'; Benatar 42'; Cerisola 48'; Lopez 50', 60'	Report	Rantala 59'

Umpires:
Tamas Hermann (HUN)
Michal Pivko (SVK)

1 August 2017
18:00

Cyprus	1–3	Slovenia
Stylianoy 44'	Report	R. Mesarič 4'; Maučec 51'; U. Stanko 57'

Umpires:
Christian Gibson (FIN)
Ivan Grgurev (CRO)

2 August 2017
18:00

Hungary	3–2	Cyprus
Suba 7'; Leber 10'; Kovacs 46'	Report	Lazarides 25'; Michael 55'

Umpires:
Oliver Tarnoczi (AUT
Michal Pivko (SVK)

3 August 2017
17:00

Finland	2–6	Slovenia
Fiskaali 22'; Laiho 25'	Report	R. Mesarič 24'; B. Stanko 38'; M. Mesarič 42', 45', 53'; Toplak 43'

Umpires:
Oliver Tarnoczi (AUT)
Tamas Hermann (HUN)

4 August 2017
11:45

Hungary	2–5	Gibraltar
Langer 17'; Papp 23'	Report	Rodriguez 21', 21'; Lopez 31'; C. Ramagge 43'; Grech 60'

Umpires:
Christian Gibson (FIN)
Ivan Grgurev (CRO)

4 August 2017
14:00

Cyprus	2–0	Finland
Stylianou 32'; Lyne 34'	Report

Umpires:
Oliver Tarnoczi (AUT)
Michal Pivko (SVK)

5 August 2017
11:30

Gibraltar	12–0	Cyprus
C. Ramagge 10', 32', 57'; Rodriguez 21', 54'; Benatar 29', 52'; Lopez 36', 42'; Gabay 45'; Cerisola 48'; L. Ramagge 60'	Report

Umpires:
Christian Gibson (FIN)
Tamas Hermann (HUN)

5 August 2017
13:45

Slovenia	3–1	Hungary
R. Mesarič 28'; M. Mesarič 37'; Maučec 55'	Report	Farkas 47'

Umpires:
Oliver Tarnoczi (AUT)
Ivan Grgurev (CRO)

== See also ==
- 2017 Men's EuroHockey Championship III
