= 2019 Women's EuroHockey Championship III =

Eighth edition of the Women's EuroHockey Championship III

Tournament details
- Host country: Slovenia
- City: Lipovci
- Dates: 28 July – 3 August
- Teams: 7 (from 1 confederation)
- Venue: HC Lipovci

Final positions
- Champions: France (1st title)
- Runner-up: Lithuania
- Third place: Switzerland

Tournament statistics
- Matches played: 15
- Goals scored: 82 (5.47 per match)
- Top scorer: (France) Victorine Vankemmel (7 goals)

The 2019 Women's EuroHockey Championship III was the eighth edition of the Women's EuroHockey Championship III, the third tier of the women's European field hockey championships organized by the European Hockey Federation. It was held from 28 July until 3 August 2019 in Lipovci, Slovenia.

The finalists, France and Lithuania, were promoted to the EuroHockey Championship II

== Teams ==
The following eight teams, shown with pre-tournament world rankings, competed in this tournament.

Gibraltar withdrew right before the competition started. This caused Hungary to be moved to pool B, replacing Gibraltar in all the games against the other teams in pool B. Pool A was left with the three remaining teams.

- Croatia (42)
- France (28)
- ~~Gibraltar (–)~~
- Hungary (–)
- Lithuania (36)
- Slovakia (–)
- Slovenia (49)
- Switzerland (39)

== Results ==
All times are local, CEST (UTC+1).

=== Preliminary round ===
==== Pool A ====
Pos	Team	Pld	W	D	L	GF	GA	GD	Pts	Qualification
1	France	2	2	0	0	18	1	+17	6	Semi-finals
2	Croatia	2	1	0	1	8	2	+6	3	Semi-finals
3	Slovenia (H)	2	0	0	2	0	23	−23	0	Pool C

Source: FIH
(H) Hosts

28 July 2019
17:00

France	16–0	Slovenia
Gaspari 2'; Lhopital 10'; Brachet 14', 21'; Lecas 16', 29' van Bolhuis 20', 57'; Vankemmel 28', 34', 36', 43', 55'; Seillier 40', 50'; Lardeur 56'	Report

Umpires:
Noelia Blanco (ESP)
Anastasia Bogolyubova (RUS)

30 July 2019
18:00

Croatia	1–2	France
Putric 48'	Report	van Bolhuis 7'; Seillier 42'

Umpires:
Anastasia Bogolyubova (RUS)
Emma Shelbourn (ENG)

31 July 2019
18:00

Slovenia	0–7	Croatia
	Report	Čolić 12'; Lagančić 22'; Litvic 24'; Makar 34'; Putric 36', 56'; Bahlen 41'

Umpires:
Ellie Duffy (IRL)
Emma Shelbourn (ENG)

==== Pool B ====
Pos	Team	Pld	W	D	L	GF	GA	GD	Pts	Qualification
1	Lithuania	3	3	0	0	14	2	+12	9	Semi-finals
2	Switzerland	3	2	0	1	17	4	+13	6	Semi-finals
3	Slovakia	3	1	0	2	4	5	−1	3	Pool C
4	Hungary	3	0	0	3	1	25	−24	0	Pool C

Source: FIH

28 July 2019
12:30

Lithuania	2–0	Slovakia
Kartanovic 34'; Kukliene 49'	Report

Umpires:
Mihaela Dimitrova (BUL)
Caroline Ellice (SCO)

28 July 2019
14:45

Switzerland	13–0	Hungary
Stomps 9', 28', 36', 56', 57'; El Allaly 13', 59'; S. Wälti 13', 30'; Thüring 20'; Fontana 34'; Triebold 35'; Schwerzmann 47'	Report

Umpires:
Emma Shelbourn (ENG)
Iva Marič (SLO)

29 July 2019
15:45

Slovakia	3–0	Hungary
Pucherova 1'; Chebenova 8'; Čapová 35'	Report

Umpires:
Ellie Duffy (IRL)
Caroline Ellice (SCO)

29 July 2019
18:00

Switzerland	1–3	Lithuania
S. Wälti 32'	Report	Pumputytė 13'; Jakovleva 35'; Poskute 40'

Umpires:
Iva Marič (SLO)
Noelia Blanco (ESP)

31 July 2019
13:30

Lithuania	9–1	Hungary
Jakovleva 13'; Andriejūnaitė 15'; Kukliene 25'; Poskute 26', 38', 54'; Pumputytė 42'; Urbonavičiūtė 53'; Adomaviciute 58'	Report	Ilkei 43'

Umpires:
Caroline Ellice (SCO)
Iva Marič (SLO)

31 July 2019
15:45

Slovakia	1–3	Switzerland
Chebenova 20'	Report	Haussener 31'; Thüring 41'; Stomps 54'

Umpires:
Anastasia Bogolyubova (RUS)
Mihaela Dimitrova (BUL)

=== Fifth to seventh place classification ===
==== Pool C ====
The points obtained in the preliminary round from the two teams in pool B against each other are taken over.

Pos	Team	Pld	W	D	L	GF	GA	GD	Pts
5	Slovakia	2	2	0	0	5	1	+4	6
6	Hungary	2	1	0	1	3	3	0	3
7	Slovenia (H)	2	0	0	2	1	5	−4	0

Source: FIH
(H) Hosts

2 August 2019
12:30

Slovenia	1–2	Slovakia
Vegič 45'	Report	Čapová 19'; Chebenova 30'

Umpires:
Mihaela Dimitrova (BUL)
Ellie Duffy (IRL)

3 August 2019
11:00

Slovenia	0–3	Hungary
	Report	Ilkei 24'; Guti 38'; Bakk 42'

Umpires:
Noelia Blanco (ESP)
Caroline Ellice (SCO)

=== First to fourth place classification ===
Semi-finals
2 August
France	4
Switzerland	0
2 August
Lithuania	3
Croatia	0

Final
3 August
France	4
Lithuania	3
Third place
3 August
Switzerland (s.o.)	0 (2)
Croatia	0 (1)

==== Semi-finals ====
2 August 2019
14:45

France	4–0	Switzerland
Simon 36'; Vankemmel 42'; Seillier 47'; Lecas 59'	Report

Umpires:
Caroline Ellice (SCO)
Emma Shelbourn (ENG)

2 August 2019
17:00

Lithuania	3–0	Croatia
Poskute 2'; Kukliene 19'; Pumputytė 58'	Report

Umpires:
Anastasia Bogolyubova (RUS)
Noelia Blanco (ESP)

==== Third place game ====
3 August 2019
13:15

Switzerland	0–0	Croatia
	Report
Penalties
Stomps (penalty shoot-out scored); E. Trösch (penalty shoot-out missed); Haussener (penalty shoot-out missed); T. Trösch (penalty shoot-out missed); Thoma (penalty shoot-out scored)	2–1	(penalty shoot-out missed) Makar; (penalty shoot-out missed) Abramovic; (penalty shoot-out missed) Litvic; (penalty shoot-out missed) Bahlen; (penalty shoot-out scored) Litvić

Umpires:
Anastasia Bogolyubova (RUS)
Ellie Duffy (IRL)

==== Final ====
3 August 2019
15:30

France	4–3	Lithuania
Vankemmel 28'; Simon 32'; Lhopital 43'; Brachet 45'	Report	Poskute 12'; Jakovleva 19'; Kartanovic 53'

Umpires:
Mihaela Dimitrova (BUL)
Emma Shelbourn (ENG)

== Statistics ==
=== Final standings ===
Rank	Team
Gold medal	France
Silver medal	Lithuania
Bronze medal	Switzerland
4	Croatia
5	Slovakia
6	Hungary
7	Slovenia

Promoted to the EuroHockey Championship II

=== Goalscorers ===
There were 82 goals scored in 15 matches, for an average of 5.47 goals per match.

7 goals

- (France) Victorine Vankemmel

6 goals

- (Lithuania) Kristina Poškutė
- (Switzerland) Sofie Stomps

4 goals

- (France) Perrine Seillier

3 goals

- (Croatia) Tea Putric
- (France) Guusje van Bolhuis
- (France) Julie Brachet
- (France) Elysee Lecas
- (Lithuania) Samanta Jakovleva
- (Lithuania) Dovilė Kuklienė
- (Lithuania) Paulina Pumputytė
- (Slovakia) Dominika Chebenova
- (Switzerland) Stephanie Wälti

2 goals

- (France) Yohanna Lhopital
- (France) Marie Simon
- (Hungary) Nóra Ilkei
- (Lithuania) Kotryna Kartanovic
- (Slovakia) Vanessa Čapová
- (Switzerland) Hasna El Allaly
- (Switzerland) Clea Thüring

1 goal

- (Croatia) Ema Bahlen
- (Croatia) Ana Čolić
- (Croatia) Dora Lagančić
- (Croatia) Ivona Makar
- (Croatia) Una Litvic
- (France) Delfina Gaspari
- (France) Ines Lardeur
- (Hungary) Nikoletta Bakk
- (Hungary) Réka Guti
- (Lithuania) Sandra Adomavičiūtė
- (Lithuania) Kornelija Andriejūnaitė
- (Lithuania) Karolina Urbonavičiūtė
- (Slovakia) Barbora Pucherova
- (Slovenia) Ana Vegič
- (Switzerland) Sae Fontana
- (Switzerland) Linda Haussener
- (Switzerland) Martina Schwerzmann
- (Switzerland) Raffaela Triebold

Source: FIH

== See also ==
- 2019 Men's EuroHockey Championship III
- 2019 Women's EuroHockey Championship II
