= 2027 EuroHockey Championships =

2027 EuroHockey Championships may refer to:

- 2027 Women's EuroHockey Championship
- 2027 Men's EuroHockey Championship
