= 2025 EuroHockey Championships =

2025 EuroHockey Championships may refer to:

- 2025 Women's EuroHockey Championship
- 2025 Men's EuroHockey Championship
- 2025 Men's EuroHockey Championship II
- 2025 Women's EuroHockey Championship II
