= 2025 Women's EuroHockey Championship III =

Field hockey tournament

Tournament details
- Host country: Turkey
- City: Alanya
- Dates: 29 July – 2 August
- Teams: 4 (from 1 confederation)

Final positions
- Champions: Ukraine (2nd title)
- Runner-up: Turkey
- Third place: Hungary

Tournament statistics
- Matches played: 8
- Goals scored: 74 (9.25 per match)
- Top scorer: (Ukraine) Karyna Leonova (13 goals)
- Best player: (Ukraine) Karyna Leonova
- Best goalkeeper: (Ukraine) Mariia Bardakova

The 2025 Women's EuroHockey Championship III was the 11th edition of the Women's EuroHockey Championship III, the third level of the women's European field hockey championships organized by the European Hockey Federation.

It was held in Alanya, Turkey from 29 July to 2 August 2025. It was the first time Turkey hosted a Women's EuroHockey Championship event.

Ukraine won their second title by defeating the defending champions and hosts Turkey 10–1 in the final. Hungary won their first ever EuroHockey Championship III medal by defeating Luxembourg 2–1 in the bronze medal match.

== Qualification ==
The four teams qualified based on their performance in the 2025 Women's EuroHockey Championship Qualifiers, with the teams finishing sixth and lower qualifying for the Championship III. Ukraine originally qualified for the Championship II but withdrew and Turkey was asked to take over the place but declined. The second highest-ranked team in the qualifiers Croatia accepted the invitation and was promoted. Gibraltar withdrew and when Ukraine wanted to rejoin the competition they were allowed back in the Championship III.

Dates	Event	Location	Quotas	Qualifiers
22–25 August 2024	EuroHockey Championship Qualifiers	Glasgow, Scotland	0	~~Croatia~~
22–25 August 2024	EuroHockey Championship Qualifiers	Douai, France	3	Luxembourg; Turkey; Ukraine
—N/a	FIH Women's World Ranking	—N/a	1	~~Gibraltar~~; Hungary
Total			4	

== Preliminary round ==
=== Pool A ===
Pos	Team	Pld	W	D	L	GF	GA	GD	Pts	Qualification
1	Turkey (H)	3	3	0	0	21	1	+20	9	Final
2	Ukraine	3	2	0	1	36	3	+33	6	Final
3	Luxembourg	3	1	0	2	2	29	−27	3	Third place match
4	Hungary	3	0	0	3	1	27	−26	0	Third place match

Source: FIH
Rules for classification: 1) points; 2) matches won; 3) goal difference; 4) goals for; 5) head-to-head result; 6) field goals for.
(H) Hosts

29 July 2025
09:00

Ukraine	18–0	Hungary
Basanets 3'; Leonova 4', 5', 11', 11', 30', 33', 52'; Popova 14', 17'; Tanchenko 15'; Voievoda 20', 32'; Korobkina 22'; Zaitseva 39', 59'; Movchan 51', 58'	Report

Umpires:
Sultan Bulut (TUR)
Viv Carveth (ENG)

19 July 2025
11:15

Turkey	11–0	Luxembourg
Gültekin 2', 18', 20', 24', 47'; Güzelal 11', 23'; Ídik 19'; Kurt 30'; Paksoy 53'; Korkmaz 54'	Report

Umpires:
Thalia Bellemans (BEL)
Zamara Espinosa (GIB)

30 July 2025
09:00

Hungary	1–2	Luxembourg
Nagy 11'	Report	Paul 35', 57'

Umpires:
Sultan Bulut (TUR)
Yevhen Stupachenko (UKR)

30 July 2025
11:15

Turkey	3–1	Ukraine
Güzelal 26', 52'; Kendir 47'	Report	Basanets 32'

Umpires:
Thalia Bellemans (BEL)
Zamara Espinosa (GIB)

1 August 2025
09:00

Ukraine	17–0	Luxembourg
Voievoda 12', 30'; Leonova 25', 34', 47', 56'; Basanets 26', 53'; Mykhailiuk 28', 59'; Tanchenko 29', 37'; Korobkina 33'; Sherstiuk 38', 60'; Popova 42', 51'	Report

Umpires:
Thalia Bellemans (BEL)
Viv Carveth (ENG)

1 August 2025
11:15

Hungary	0–7	Turkey
	Report	Gültekin 3', 6'; Korkmaz 13'; Kendir 18'; Baran 23'; Demir 28'; Güzelal 35'

Umpires:
Zamara Espinosa (GIB)
Yevhen Stupachenko (UKR)

== Classification round ==
=== Third and fourth place ===
2 August 2025
09:00

Luxembourg	1–2	Hungary
Paul 43'	Report	Józan 47'; Sütő 56'

Umpires:
Sultan Bulut (TUR)
Yevhen Stupachenko (UKR)

=== Final ===
2 August 2025
11:15

Turkey	1–10	Ukraine
Bahçivan 22'	Report	Leonova 6', 58'; Tanchenko 19'; Korobkina 25'; Movchan 28', 30'; Basanets 33'; Kernoz 36'; Sherstiuk 39'; Shyshyna 53'

Umpires:
Thalia Bellemans (BEL)
Viv Carveth (ENG)

== Statistics ==
=== Final standings ===
Pos	Team
1	Ukraine
2	Turkey (H)
3	Hungary
4	Luxembourg

Source: FIH
(H) Host

=== Awards ===
The following awards were given at the conclusion of the tournament.

Award	Player
Player of the Tournament	(Ukraine) Karyna Leonova
Leading goalscorer	(Ukraine) Karyna Leonova
Goalkeeper of the Tournament	(Ukraine) Mariia Bardakova

== See also ==
- 2025 Men's EuroHockey Championship III
- 2025 Women's EuroHockey Championship II
