= FIH Women's World Ranking =

Field hockey world ranking list

The FIH Women's World Rankings is a ranking system for women's national teams in field hockey. The teams of the member nations of International Hockey Federation (FIH), field hockey's world governing body, are ranked based on their game results. The rankings were introduced in October 2003.

== Current rankings ==
Women's Ranking as of 3 October 2026
Rank	Change	Team	Points
1	Steady	Netherlands	4083.1
2	Steady	Argentina	3757
3	Steady	Belgium	3494.71
4	Steady	China	3118.34
5	Steady	Spain	3089.9
6	Steady	Germany	3063.32
7	▲1	India	3053.45
8	▼1	England	3044.18
9	Steady	Australia	2812.79
10	Steady	United States	2612.48
11	Steady	Japan	2467.91
12	Steady	New Zealand	2446.97
13	Steady	Ireland	2426.82
14	Steady	Scotland	2415.46
15	▲2	South Korea	2109.81
16	▼1	Chile	2108.84
17	▼1	France	2094.21
18	Steady	South Africa	2050.93
19	▲1	Uruguay	2003.01
20	▼1	Italy	1995.37
21	Steady	Malaysia	1971.19
22	Steady	Belarus	1803.25
23	Steady	Russia	1791.53
24	Steady	Wales	1782.86
25	Steady	Poland	1704.83
26	Steady	Canada	1676.22
27	▲1	Ukraine	1637.59
28	▼1	Thailand	1617.3
29	Steady	Czech Republic	1606.34
30	Steady	Mexico	1595.56
31	Steady	Austria	1588.14
32	Steady	Kenya	1573.85
33	Steady	Ghana	1570.9
34	Steady	Hong Kong	1426.06
35	Steady	Switzerland	1400.34
36	Steady	Turkey	1395.93
37	Steady	Cuba	1384.22
38	▲1	Nigeria	1311.22
39	▲3	Chinese Taipei	1263.84
40	▲1	Guatemala	1249.23
41	▲3	Paraguay	1239.35
42	▲4	Indonesia	1229.65
43	▲2	Fiji	1222.5
44	▼4	Kazakhstan	1215.28
45	▼7	Singapore	1205.8
46	▼3	Peru	1197.63
47	Steady	Papua New Guinea	1196.25
48	Steady	Barbados	1196.1
49	Steady	Dominican Republic	1194.52
50	Steady	Solomon Islands	1191.5
51	Steady	Lithuania	1191.44
52	Steady	Namibia	1190.39
53	Steady	Trinidad and Tobago	1180.8
54	Steady	Tonga	1179.5
55	Steady	Hungary	1176.23
56	Steady	Pakistan	1172
57	Steady	Puerto Rico	1153
58	Steady	Slovenia	1145.9
59	Steady	Bolivia	1142.47
60	Steady	Panama	1139.12
61	Steady	Zimbabwe	1137.77
62	Steady	Guyana	1136.05
63	Steady	Samoa	1133.75
64	Steady	Vanuatu	1130
65	▲1	Egypt	1111.75
66	▼1	Uzbekistan	1095
67	Steady	Brunei	1094.7
68	Steady	Croatia	1079.32
69	Steady	Brazil	1066.49
70	Steady	Sri Lanka	1058.09
71	Steady	Slovakia	1058.02
72	Steady	Bermuda	1046.06
73	Steady	Jamaica	1043.66
74	Steady	Portugal	1019.53
75	Steady	Cambodia	992.94
76	Steady	Zambia	960.64
77	Steady	Costa Rica	875.86
78	Steady	Uganda	870.43
79	Steady	Malawi	731.63
80	Steady	Venezuela	726.83
81	Steady	Gibraltar	695.21
82	Steady	Tajikistan	668.53
83	Steady	Luxembourg	552.95
84	Steady	Eswatini	447.02
85	Steady	Bangladesh	353.64
86	Steady	Kyrgyzstan	280.22
87	Steady	Morocco	145.66
88	Steady	Finland	72.59
*Change from 31 August 2026

== Uses of the rankings ==
The rankings were introduced to overcome the criticism of fixing when drawing the pools for each tournament. It also determines the quotas for tournaments such as the Olympic Games and the World Cup.

== Calculation method ==
=== Overview ===
All of the FIH-recognised, including qualifying and continental matches played in last four years are included in ranking points calculation. However, the past results will be deducted by the percentage set by the FIH as shown by the tabulation below:

Year	Points percentage included
Year 4	100%
Year 3	75%
Year 2	50%
Year 1	25%
Total points

=== Continental championships method ===
FIH had set allocated ranking points for all the continental tournaments. However, a different percentage of points for every continent raised questions about the system. Only Europe had full 100% points allocation for all classifications while the others had only several finishers with full points allocation. Africa was the sole continent with neither men's or women's tournaments having full points allocation regardless of the classifications.

=== New calculation method ===
From 2020 onwards, the FIH rolled out a new match-based world rankings system similar to the ones being used in rugby union and association football.

== Rank leaders ==
Women's at the end of each year
Year	Team
Present	Netherlands
2025	Netherlands
2024	Netherlands
2023	Netherlands
2022	Netherlands
2021	Netherlands
2020	Netherlands
2019	Netherlands
2018	Netherlands
2017	Netherlands
2016	Netherlands
2015	Netherlands
2014	Netherlands
2013	Netherlands
2012	Netherlands
2011	Argentina
2010	Argentina
2009	Netherlands
2008	Netherlands
2007	Netherlands
2006	Netherlands
2005	Netherlands
2004	Netherlands
2003	Argentina

Women's Leaderboard
Team	Years
Netherlands	20
Argentina	3

== See also ==
- FIH Men's World Ranking
