= 2027 Women's EuroHockey Championship =

International field hockey competition

Tournament details
- Host country: England
- Dates: 28 July – 8 August
- Teams: 12 (from 1 confederation)
- Venue: 2 (in 1 host city)

The 2027 Women's EuroHockey Championship will be the 18th edition of the Women's EuroHockey Championship, the biennial international women's field hockey championship of Europe organised by the European Hockey Federation. This will be the first edition since 2003 with 12 teams participating.

The tournament will be held alongside the men's tournament at two venues in London, England in the from 28 July to 8 August 2027. The preliminary rounds and the quarter-finals will be held at the Lee Valley Hockey and Tennis Centre and the semi-finals and finals will be held at Twickenham Stoop. It will be the fourth time England will host the Women's EuroHockey Championship and the third time it will be held in London. The winner will qualify for the 2028 Summer Olympics.

== Format change ==
=== Original format change ===
In April 2024, it was announced the EuroHockey Championships would expand from an eight-team to a 12-team tournament, introducing a knock-out format for both men's and women's competitions. This marked the first major format change in over two decades, aimed at increasing competition and inclusivity in European hockey. Under the new format, the teams ranked 5th to 12th competed in an initial knock-out round, with winners advancing to the quarter-finals. The losers of this preliminary round received a second chance, facing off against the top four ranked teams for the remaining quarter-final slots. Quarter-final winners progressed to the semi-finals and then to either the final or the bronze medal match, while quarter-final losers competed for rankings from 5th to 8th place. Teams finishing in the lowest positions played additional matches to determine rankings from 9th to 12th.

=== Final format change ===
It was decided to scrap the all knock-out matches format because it could have impacted tickets and potential television coverage if a host nation exited early. A group stage was added with four groups of three. The top six nations on the FIH World Ranking following the 2026 World Cup are in Pools A and B, and the remainder are in Pools C and D. All teams in Pool A and B will move on to the quarterfinals. The winners in Pool C and D will also move on to the quarterfinals, with the remaining teams battling for places 9 through 12. These lower rankings could be later used to determine eligibility for future tournaments.

== Qualification ==
All eight teams from the 2025 edition qualified directly for the expanded edition of the tournament. They will be joined by the winner and runner-up from the 2025 EuroHockey Championship II and the winner and runner-up from the 2026 EuroHockey Championship Qualifier tournaments.

=== Qualified teams ===
Dates	Event	Location	Quotas	Qualifiers
27 July – 2 August 2025	2025 EuroHockey Championship II	Gniezno, Poland	2	Italy; Wales
8–16 August 2025	2025 EuroHockey Championship	Mönchengladbach, Germany	8	Belgium; England; France; Ireland; Germany; Netherlands; Scotland; Spain
9–12 July 2026	2026 EuroHockey Championship Qualifier I	Prague, Czech Republic	2	Austria; Ukraine
Total			12	

=== Summary of qualified teams ===
Team	Qualification method	Date of qualification	Appearance(s)				Previous best performance (Note: Bold text indicates they hosted that edition.)	WR (Note: World ranking at start of tournament)
Team	Qualification method	Date of qualification	Total	First	Last	Streak	Previous best performance	WR
Belgium	2025 Women's EuroHockey Championship	25 April 2024	14th	1984	2025	9	Runners-up (2017, 2023)	TBD
England	2025 Women's EuroHockey Championship	25 April 2024	18th	1984	2025	18	Champions (1991, 2015)	TBD
Ireland	2025 Women's EuroHockey Championship	25 April 2024	17th	1984	2025	6	Fifth place (1984, 2005, 2009, 2019, 2023)	TBD
Germany	2025 Women's EuroHockey Championship	25 April 2024	18th	1984	2025	18	Champions (2007, 2013)	TBD
Netherlands	2025 Women's EuroHockey Championship	25 April 2024	18th	1984	2025	18	Champions (Thirteen times) (Note: Netherlands have won in 1984, 1987, 1995, 1999, 2003, 2005, 2009, 2011, 2017, 2019, 2021, 2023 and 2025.)	TBD
Spain	2025 Women's EuroHockey Championship	25 April 2024	18th	1984	2025	18	Runners-up (1995, 2003)	TBD
France	2025 Women's EuroHockey Championship	25 August 2024	9th	1984	2025	2	Sixth place (2025)	TBD
Scotland	2025 Women's EuroHockey Championship	25 August 2024	15th	1984	2025	7	Fifth place (1991, 2025)	TBD
Wales	2025 EuroHockey Championship II	1 August 2025	4th	1987	2003	1	Eighth place (1987)	TBD
Italy	2025 EuroHockey Championship II	1 August 2025	11th	1984	2023	1	Seventh place (2007, 2015)	TBD
Austria	2026 EuroHockey Championship Qualifier I	11 July 2026	4th	1984	1991	1	Eleventh place (1984)	TBD
Ukraine	2026 EuroHockey Championship Qualifier I	11 July 2026	5th	1999	2007	1	Fifth place (2003)	TBD

== Preliminary round ==
The pools were announced on 4 September 2026.

=== Pool A ===
Pos	Team	Pld	W	D	L	GF	GA	GD	Pts	Qualification
1	Netherlands	0	0	0	0	0	0	0	0	Quarterfinals
2	Germany	0	0	0	0	0	0	0	0	Quarterfinals
3	England	0	0	0	0	0	0	0	0	Quarterfinals

First match(es) will be played: August 2027. Source:
Rules for classification: 1) points; 2) matches won; 3) goal difference; 4) goals for; 5) head-to-head result; 6) field goals for.

=== Pool B ===
Pos	Team	Pld	W	D	L	GF	GA	GD	Pts	Qualification
1	Belgium	0	0	0	0	0	0	0	0	Quarterfinals
2	Spain	0	0	0	0	0	0	0	0	Quarterfinals
3	Ireland	0	0	0	0	0	0	0	0	Quarterfinals

First match(es) will be played: August 2027. Source:
Rules for classification: 1) points; 2) matches won; 3) goal difference; 4) goals for; 5) head-to-head result; 6) field goals for.

=== Pool C ===
Pos	Team	Pld	W	D	L	GF	GA	GD	Pts	Qualification
1	Scotland	0	0	0	0	0	0	0	0	Quarterfinals
2	Wales	0	0	0	0	0	0	0	0	
3	Ukraine	0	0	0	0	0	0	0	0	

First match(es) will be played: August 2027. Source:
Rules for classification: 1) points; 2) matches won; 3) goal difference; 4) goals for; 5) head-to-head result; 6) field goals for.

=== Pool D ===
Pos	Team	Pld	W	D	L	GF	GA	GD	Pts	Qualification
1	France	0	0	0	0	0	0	0	0	Quarterfinals
2	Italy	0	0	0	0	0	0	0	0	
3	Austria	0	0	0	0	0	0	0	0	

First match(es) will be played: August 2027. Source:
Rules for classification: 1) points; 2) matches won; 3) goal difference; 4) goals for; 5) head-to-head result; 6) field goals for.

== Classification round ==
=== Bracket ===
9–12th place semifinals
August
August

Ninth place game
August
Eleventh place game
August

== Knockout stage ==
=== Bracket ===
Quarter-finals
August
August
August
August

Semi-finals
August
August

Final
August
Third place
August
