= 2026 Women's EuroHockey Championship Qualifier II =

Women's EuroHockey Championship Qualifier II
Tournament details
- Host country: Finland
- City: Helsinki
- Dates: 9–12 July
- Teams: 4 (from 1 confederation)

Final positions
- Champions: Luxembourg
- Runner-up: Hungary
- Third place: Gibraltar

Tournament statistics
- Matches played: 7
- Goals scored: 34 (4.86 per match)
- Top scorer: (Hungary) Rio Esperanza (4 goals)
- Best player: (Hungary) Rio Esperanza
- Best goalkeeper: (Luxembourg) Chloe Heal

The 2026 Women's EuroHockey Championship Qualifier II was a qualification event for the 2027 Women's EuroHockey Championship II. Qualifier II was held in Helsinki, Finland from 9 to 12 July 2026.

Luxembourg and Hungary qualified for the 2027 Women's EuroHockey Championship II by finishing in the top two.

== Teams ==
- Finland
- Gibraltar
- Hungary
- Luxembourg

== Preliminary round ==
All times are in (UTC+3)

=== Pool A ===
Pos	Team	Pld	W	D	L	GF	GA	GD	Pts	Qualification
1	Hungary	3	2	0	1	15	3	+12	6	Final
2	Luxembourg	3	2	0	1	8	5	+3	6	Final
3	Gibraltar	3	2	0	1	5	3	+2	6	Third place match
4	Finland	3	0	0	3	0	17	−17	0	Third place match

Source: FIH
Rules for classification: 1) points; 2) matches won; 3) goal difference; 4) goals for; 5) head-to-head result; 6) field goals for.

9 July 2026
09:30

Hungary	0–1	Gibraltar
	Report	Caetano 53'

Umpires:
Anatole Platel (FRA)
Alia Raude (GER)

9 July 2026
11:45

Luxembourg	3–0	Finland
Paul 32', 48'; De Cooman 37'	Report

Umpires:
Sarah Craig (IRL)
Zamara Espinosa (GIB)

10 July 2026
09:30

Luxembourg	2–4	Hungary
van der Looven 11'; Krüger 51'	Report	Ilkei 2'; Józan 42'; Esperanza 49'; Tóth 59'

Umpires:
Sarah Craig (IRL)
Simo Makela (FIN)

10 July 2026
11:45

Gibraltar	3–0	Finland
Elliot 9'; Silva 22'; Chellaram 59'	Report

Umpires:
Mia Dewing (ENG)
Alessandro Amore (MLT)

11 July 2026
09:15

Gibraltar	1–3	Luxembourg
Olivero 4'	Report	van der Looven 23'; Paul 39'; De Cooman 56'

Umpires:
Balasz Szalay (HUN)
Karolis Donculas (LTU)

11 July 2026
11:30

Hungary	11–0	Finland
Győrfi 3'; Esperanza 6', 33', 43'; Gyarmati 10'; Den Heijer 24', 56'; Ilkei 28'; Barki 47', 57'; Józan 49'	Report

Umpires:
Duncan Ruzzak (SCO)
Zamara Espinosa (GIB)

== Classification round ==
=== Third place match ===
12 July 2026
08:30

Gibraltar	6–0	Finland
Olivero 4'; Bossano-Annes 13'; Caetano 37'; Brooks 50'; Olivero 52'; Casciaro 56'	Report

Umpires:
Karolis Donculas (LTU)
Mia Dewing (ENG)

=== Final ===
12 July 2026
10:45

Hungary	1–1	Luxembourg
Józan 51'	Report	Krüger 40'
Penalties
Gyarmati (penalty shoot-out missed); Józan (penalty shoot-out missed); Esperanza (penalty shoot-out missed); Den Heijer (penalty shoot-out missed); Sutő (penalty shoot-out missed)	0–1	(penalty shoot-out missed) Paul; (penalty shoot-out scored) Steffey; (penalty shoot-out missed) Parisis; (penalty shoot-out missed) Krüger

Umpires:
Zamara Espinosa (GIB)
Simo Makela (FIN)

== Final standings ==
Pos	Team	Qualification
1st place, gold medalist(s)	Luxembourg	2027 EuroHockey Championship II
2nd place, silver medalist(s)	Hungary	2027 EuroHockey Championship II
3rd place, bronze medalist(s)	Gibraltar	
4	Finland	

Source: FIH

== Goalscorers ==
There were 36 goals scored in 8 matches, for an average of 4.5 goals per match.

4 goals

- (Hungary) Rio Esperanza

3 goals

- (Gibraltar) Reighann Olivero
- (Hungary) Sára Józan
- (Luxembourg) Natalie Paul

2 goals

- (Gibraltar) Natalie Caetano
- (Hungary) Dóra Barki
- (Hungary) Noémi Den Heijer
- (Hungary) Nóra Ilkei
- (Luxembourg) Maude De Cooman
- (Luxembourg) Louise van der Looven
- (Luxembourg) Diane Krüger

1 goal

- (Gibraltar) Tara Bossano-Annes
- (Gibraltar) Ruby Brooks
- (Gibraltar) Alexandra Casciaro
- (Gibraltar) Paris Chellaram
- (Gibraltar) Rebecca Elliot
- (Gibraltar) Eva Silva
- (Hungary) Luca Gyarmati
- (Hungary) Boglárka Győrfi
- (Hungary) Zsuzsanna Tóth

Source: FIH

== See also ==
- 2026 Women's EuroHockey Championship Qualifier I
- 2027 Men's EuroHockey Championship Qualifiers
