= Katie McKee =

Irish field hockey player

Personal information
- Full name: Katie Glenda McKee
- Born: 27 September 1999 (age 26) Newry, Northern Ireland

Sport
- Sport: Field hockey
- Position: Midfield
- Club: Pegasus
National team
Years	Team	Caps	Goals
2022–	Ireland	30	(1)
Medal record
Women's field hockey
Representing Ireland
FIH Nations Cup
Silver medal – second place	2023–24 Terrassa
Silver medal – second place	2024–25 Santiago

Katie Glenda McKee (born 27 September 1999) is a field hockey player from Ireland.

== Personal life ==
McKee was born and raised in Newry, Northern Ireland. He older brother, Johnny, is also in international field hockey player for Ireland.

She is a former student of Banbridge Academy.

== Career ==
=== Domestic league ===
In the Irish Hockey League, McKee plays for Pegasus.

=== Green Army ===
McKee made her debut for the Green Army in 2022. She was named in the Ireland squad for the FIH World Cup held in Terrassa and Amsterdam, making her senior international debut in a match against eventual champions, the Netherlands. She made another appearance later that year at the EuroHockey Championship Qualifiers in Dublin.

Throughout her international career she has medalled twice, taking home silver at the 2023–24 and 2024–25 editions of the FIH Nations Cup held in Terrassa and Santiago, respectively.

She has also represented Ireland at the 2023 and 2025 editions of the EuroHockey Championship, both held in Mönchengladbach.
