= 2011 Women's EuroHockey Championship III =

Field hockey tournament

Tournament details
- Host country: Austria
- City: Vienna
- Dates: 25–31 July
- Teams: 6 (from 1 confederation)

Final positions
- Champions: Lithuania (1st title)
- Runner-up: Austria
- Third place: Czech Republic

Tournament statistics
- Matches played: 15
- Goals scored: 105 (7 per match)

The 2011 Women's EuroHockey Championship III was the fourth edition of the Women's EuroHockey Championship III, the third level of the women's European field hockey championships organized by the European Hockey Federation. It was held in Vienna, Austria from 25 to 31 July 2011.

Lithuania won its first EuroHockey Championship III title and were promoted to the 2013 EuroHockey Championship II together with the hosts Austria.

== Results ==
=== Standings ===
| Pos | Team | Pld | W | D | L | GF | GA | GD | Pts | Promotion |
|---|---|---|---|---|---|---|---|---|---|---|
| 1 | Lithuania | 5 | 4 | 0 | 1 | 38 | 4 | +34 | 12 | EuroHockey Championship II |
| 2 | Austria (H) | 5 | 4 | 0 | 1 | 28 | 5 | +23 | 12 | EuroHockey Championship II |
| 3 | Czech Republic | 5 | 4 | 0 | 1 | 24 | 4 | +20 | 12 | |
| 4 | Turkey | 5 | 2 | 0 | 3 | 7 | 36 | −29 | 6 | |
| 5 | Slovakia | 5 | 1 | 0 | 4 | 5 | 18 | −13 | 3 | |
| 6 | Bulgaria | 5 | 0 | 0 | 5 | 3 | 38 | −35 | 0 | |

Source: TheSports.org
(H) Hosts

=== Matches ===
25 July 2011
12:30

| Lithuania | 18–0 | Bulgaria |

25 July 2011
15:00

| Czech Republic | 8–0 | Turkey |

25 July 2011
17:30

| Austria | 3–1 | Slovakia |

26 July 2011
12:30

| Lithuania | 10–0 | Turkey |

26 July 2011
15:00

| Czech Republic | 6–0 | Slovakia |

26 July 2011
17:30

| Bulgaria | 1–7 | Austria |

28 July 2011
14:15

| Bulgaria | 0–6 | Czech Republic |

28 July 2011
16:15

| Slovakia | 1–3 | Turkey |

28 July 2011
18:00

| Austria | 2–1 | Lithuania |

30 July 2011
10:00

| Slovakia | 3–0 | Bulgaria |

30 July 2011
12:30

| Czech Republic | 2–3 | Lithuania |

30 July 2011
15:00

| Turkey | 0–15 | Austria |

31 July 2011
09:00

| Lithuania | 6–0 | Slovakia |

31 July 2011
11:30

| Turkey | 4–2 | Bulgaria |

31 July 2011
14:00

| Austria | 1–2 | Czech Republic |

== See also ==
- 2011 Men's EuroHockey Championship III
- 2011 Women's EuroHockey Championship II
