= 2025 Women's EuroHockey Championship II =

Field hockey tournament in Gniezno, Poland

Tournament details
- Host country: Poland
- City: Gniezno
- Dates: 27 July–2 August
- Teams: 8 (from 1 confederation)
- Venue: Alfonsa Flinika Hockey Stadium

Final positions
- Champions: Italy (2nd title)
- Runner-up: Wales
- Third place: Austria

Tournament statistics
- Matches played: 20
- Goals scored: 72 (3.6 per match)
- Top scorer(s): (Czech Republic) Nikol Babická (Poland) Wiktoria Blaszyk (5 goals)
- Best player: (Wales) Betsan Thomas
- Best goalkeeper: (Switzerland) Ursina Fazis

The 2025 Women's EuroHockey Championship II was the eleventh edition of the Women's EuroHockey Championship II, the second level of the women's European field hockey championships organized by the European Hockey Federation.

It was held from 27 July to 2 August 2025 in Gniezno, Poland. The finalists qualified directly for the 2027 Women's EuroHockey Championship in London, England. The top four teams qualified for the 2026 World Cup Qualifiers.

Italy won their second EuroHockey Championship II title by defeating Wales 2–1 in the final. Austria won the bronze medal by defeating Switzerland 2–0 in a shoot-out after the third place match finished 1–1.

== Qualification ==
The eight teams qualified based on their performance in the 2025 Women's EuroHockey Championship Qualifiers, with the runners-up, third, fourth and fifth-placed teams qualifying for the Championship II. Ukraine withdrew and Turkey was asked to take over the place but declined. The second highest-ranked team in the qualifiers Croatia accepted the invitation.

Dates	Event	Location	Quotas	Qualifiers
22–25 August 2024	EuroHockey Championship Qualifiers	Glasgow, Scotland	5	Wales; Czech Republic; Austria; Lithuania; Croatia
22–25 August 2024	EuroHockey Championship Qualifiers	Douai, France	3	Poland; Italy; ~~Ukraine~~; Switzerland
Total			8	

== Preliminary round ==
=== Pool A ===
Pos	Team	Pld	W	D	L	GF	GA	GD	Pts	Qualification
1	Italy	3	2	1	0	11	3	+8	7	Semi-finals and 2026 World Cup Qualifiers
2	Austria	3	2	1	0	7	3	+4	7	Semi-finals and 2026 World Cup Qualifiers
3	Poland (H)	3	1	0	2	5	2	+3	3	
4	Croatia	3	0	0	3	0	15	−15	0	

Source: FIH
Rules for classification: 1) points; 2) matches won; 3) goal difference; 4) goals for; 5) head-to-head result; 6) field goals for.
(H) Hosts

27 July 2025
15:45

Poland	5–0	Croatia
Blaszyk 20', 41'; Balcerzak 20'; Wochna 23'; Rybacha 26'	Report

Umpires:
Chloe McCall (WAL)
Karolina Daukantaitė (LTU)

27 July 2025
18:00

Italy	3–3	Austria
Laurito 23'; Dalla Vittoria 25'; Lunghi 43'	Report	Hahnenkamp 14'; Minar 20'; Vukovich 53'

Umpires:
Lizelotte Wolter (NED)
Julia Wagner (SUI)

29 July 2025
15:15

Austria	3–0	Croatia
P. Proksch 23'; Czech 34'; Pultar 44'	Report

Umpires:
Ilaria Amorosini (ITA)
Julia Wagner (SUI)

29 July 2025
17:30

Poland	0–1	Italy
	Report	Lunghi 20'

Umpires:
Zoe Hall (ENG)
Karolina Daukantaitė (LTU)

30 July 2025
15:45

Italy	7–0	Croatia
Oviedo 2'; Bormida 25'; Laurito 32'; Carosso 33'; Brea 46'; Moras 56'; Granatto 57'	Report

Umpires:
Chloe McCall (WAL)
Karolina Daukantaitė (LTU)

30 July 2025
18:00

Austria	1–0	Poland
Pultar 56'	Report

Umpires:
Zoe Hall (ENG)
Manouk Bakker (NED)

=== Pool B ===
Pos	Team	Pld	W	D	L	GF	GA	GD	Pts	Qualification
1	Wales	3	3	0	0	8	1	+7	9	Semi-finals and 2026 World Cup Qualifiers
2	Switzerland	3	1	1	1	5	2	+3	4	Semi-finals and 2026 World Cup Qualifiers
3	Czech Republic	3	1	1	1	6	7	−1	4	
4	Lithuania	3	0	0	3	1	10	−9	0	

Source: FIH
Rules for classification: 1) points; 2) matches won; 3) goal difference; 4) goals for; 5) head-to-head result; 6) field goals for.

27 July 2025
11:15

Czech Republic	4–1	Lithuania
Babická 21'; Pribikova 30'; Hájková 46', 52'	Report	Juraite 26'

Umpires:
Zoe Hall (ENG)
Una Mihajlović (CRO)

27 July 2025
13:30

Wales	1–0	Switzerland
Bingham 8'	Report

Umpires:
Ilaria Amorosini (ITA)
Paula Slawinska (POL)

29 July 2025
10:30

Czech Republic	1–5	Wales
Duchková 49'	Report	Peers 33'; Holme 36'; Daniel 50'; Bingham 53'; Thomas 56'

Umpires:
Lizelotte Wolter (NED)
Manouk Bakker (NED)

29 July 2025
12:45

Switzerland	4–0	Lithuania
Stomps 1', 16'; Flury 5'; T. Trösch 58'	Report

Umpires:
Chloe McWall (WAL)
Paula Slawinska (POL)

30 July 2025
11:15

Wales	2–0	Lithuania
Cradden 5', 44'	Report

Umpires:
Una Mihajlović (CRO)
Paula Slawinska (POL)

30 July 2025
13:30

Switzerland	1–1	Czech Republic
Flury 26'	Report	Hájková 55'

Umpires:
Lizelotte Wolter (NED)
Ilaria Amorosini (ITA)

== Fifth to eighth place classification ==
=== Pool C ===
The points obtained in the preliminary round against the other team were carried over.

Pos	Team	Pld	W	D	L	GF	GA	GD	Pts
5	Poland (H)	3	3	0	0	12	2	+10	9
6	Czech Republic	3	2	0	1	11	5	+6	6
7	Lithuania	3	1	0	2	3	9	−6	3
8	Croatia	3	0	0	3	2	12	−10	0

Source: FIH
Rules for classification: 1) points; 2) matches won; 3) goal difference; 4) goals for; 5) head-to-head result; 6) field goals for.
(H) Hosts

1 August 2025
10:15

Croatia	1–2	Lithuania
Nizek 30'	Report	Žigytė 8'; Gudeliauskytė 37'

Umpires:
Paula Slawinska (POL)
Julia Wagner (SUI)

1 August 2025
12:30

Poland	3–2	Czech Republic
Wochna 27'; Rymer 29'; Rybacha 39'	Report	Al-Amelova 23'; Hájková 60'

Umpires:
Zoe Hall (ENG)
Una Mihajlović (CRO)

2 August 2025
09:00

Poland	4–0	Lithuania
Blaszyk 1', 42', 47'; Tatarczuk 53'	Report

Umpires:
Una Mihajlović (CRO)
Julia Wagner (SUI)

2 August 2025
11:15

Czech Republic	5–1	Croatia
Babická 20', 32', 33', 44'; Pribikova 54'	Report	Soljan 31'

Umpires:
Ilaria Amorosini (ITA)
Karolina Daukantaitė (LTU)

== First to fourth place classification ==
=== Bracket ===
Semi-finals
1 August
Wales	2
Austria	1
1 August
Italy	3
Switzerland	0

Final
2 August
Wales	1
Italy	2
Third place
2 August
Austria (s.o.)	1 (2)
Switzerland	1 (0)

=== Semi-finals ===
1 August 2025
14:45

Wales	2–1	Austria
Bingham 21'; Cradden 59'	Report	Vukovich 49'

Umpires:
Ilaria Amorosini (ITA)
Manouk Bakker (NED)

1 August 2025
17:00

Italy	3–0	Switzerland
Cabut 31'; Granatto 37'; Brea 50'	Report

Umpires:
Lizelotte Wolter (NED)
Karolina Daukantaitė (LTU)

=== Third and fourth place ===
2 August 2025
13:45

Austria	1–1	Switzerland
Kern 59'	Report	Stomps 36'
Penalties
Czech (penalty shoot-out scored); Buchta (penalty shoot-out missed); Kern (penalty shoot-out scored); K. Proksch (penalty shoot-out missed)	2–0	(penalty shoot-out missed) Stomps; (penalty shoot-out missed) Flury; (penalty shoot-out missed) Zepf; (penalty shoot-out missed) Härtsch

Umpires:
Lizelotte Wolter (NED)
Chloe McCall (WAL)

=== Final ===
2 August 2025
16:00

Wales	1–2	Italy
Howell 31'	Report	Fiorelli 15'; Carta 40'

Umpires:
Zoe Hall (ENG)
Manouk Bakker (NED)

== Final standings ==
Pos	Team	Qualification
1	Italy	2026 World Cup Qualifiers and 2027 EuroHockey Championship
2	Wales	2026 World Cup Qualifiers and 2027 EuroHockey Championship
3	Austria	2026 World Cup Qualifiers
4	Switzerland	2026 World Cup Qualifiers
5	Poland (H)	
6	Czech Republic	
7	Lithuania	
8	Croatia	

Source: FIH
(H) Host

== See also ==
- 2025 Women's EuroHockey Championship
- 2025 Women's EuroHockey Championship III
- 2025 Men's EuroHockey Championship II
