= 2013 Women's EuroHockey Championship III =

Field hockey tournament

Tournament details
- Host country: Greece
- City: Athens
- Dates: 21–26 July
- Teams: 6 (from 1 confederation)

Final positions
- Champions: Wales (2nd title)
- Runner-up: Czech Republic
- Third place: Switzerland

Tournament statistics
- Matches played: 15
- Goals scored: 76 (5.07 per match)

The 2013 Women's EuroHockey Championship III was the fifth edition of the Women's EuroHockey Championship III, the third level of the women's European field hockey championships organized by the European Hockey Federation. It was held in Athens, Greece alongside the Men's EuroHockey Championship IV from 21 to 26 July 2013.

Wales won its second EuroHockey Championship III title and were promoted to the 2015 EuroHockey Championship II together with the Czech Republic.

== Results ==
=== Standings ===
Pos	Team	Pld	W	D	L	GF	GA	GD	Pts	Promotion
1	Wales	5	5	0	0	20	1	+19	15	EuroHockey Championship II
2	Czech Republic	5	4	0	1	31	5	+26	12	EuroHockey Championship II
3	Switzerland	5	3	0	2	13	6	+7	9	
4	Turkey	5	2	0	3	7	9	−2	6	
5	Slovakia	5	1	0	4	3	20	−17	3	
6	Greece (H)	5	0	0	5	2	35	−33	0	

Source: TheSports.org
(H) Hosts

=== Matches ===
21 July 2013
08:00

Czech Republic	10–0	Slovakia

21 July 2013
10:00

Switzerland	2–1	Turkey

21 July 2013
17:00

Wales	10–0	Greece

22 July 2013
15:00

Switzerland	3–0	Slovakia

22 July 2013
17:00

Wales	1–0	Turkey

22 July 2013
19:00

Czech Republic	13–0	Greece

23 July 2013
15:00

Turkey	2–0	Slovakia

23 July 2013
17:00

Wales	2–1	Czech Republic

23 July 2013
19:00

Switzerland	7–0	Greece

25 July 2013
08:00

Wales	3–0	Switzerland

25 July 2013
10:00

Czech Republic	5–2	Turkey

25 July 2013
17:00

Slovakia	3–1	Greece

26 July 2013
10:00

Czech Republic	2–1	Switzerland

26 July 2013
16:00

Wales	4–0	Slovakia

26 July 2013
18:00

Turkey	2–1	Greece

== See also ==
- 2013 Men's EuroHockey Championship III
- 2013 Women's EuroHockey Championship II
