= Portugal women's national field hockey team =

Portugal
- Association: Portuguese Hockey Federation (Federação Portuguesa de Hóquei)
- Confederation: EHF (Europe)
- Head Coach: João Freitas
- Manager: Maegan Silva
- Captain: Claudia Fidalgo; Ana Nogueira

FIH ranking
- Current: 75 (10 March 2026)

The Portugal women's national field hockey team represents Portugal in women's international field hockey and is controlled by the Portuguese Hockey Federation, the governing body for field hockey in Portugal.

Portugal made their international women's debut at the 2021 Women's EuroHockey Championship III, they won their first-ever match 6–1 against Slovakia.

== Tournament record ==
=== EuroHockey Championship III ===
- 2021 – 5th place

== See also ==
- Portugal men's national field hockey team
