= Gibraltar Hockey Association =

Sporting association in Gibraltar

The Gibraltar Hockey Association (GHA) is the governing body of field hockey in Gibraltar. It was initially founded as the Civilian Hockey Association in 1948, although hockey was being played prior to this under the British military forces based in Gibraltar. A year later changed its name to the Gibraltar Hockey Association.

== History ==
The Association had been a predominantly men's hockey association up until the mid nineties when ladies hockey was introduced and a league competition was established. This Association of approximately 250 hockey players (both men and women) amongst a population of 30000 inhabitants has certainly made its mark in International Hockey.

== European Hockey Federation ==
Gibraltar hockey has a great tradition in European hockey becoming European Hockey Federation (EHF) members in 1969 and participating in the European Club Championship qualifiers that year.

== Tournaments ==
There have been a number of highlights in Gibraltar's European exploits such as Winning the B and C Divisions at club level and playing in the A Division in no less than 4 occasions. The greatest achievement however was in 1978 when Gibraltar qualified for the European Nations Cup Finals held in Hanover and although finishing in 12th position it was a great achievement.
In more recent times also at National level Gibraltar has enjoyed success at the Mediterranean Cups in 1999 and 2001 where Gibraltar won silver and bronze medal respectively. Over the many years, Gibraltar has hosted a good number of European Tournaments and can boast of a National Hockey Stadium with an excellent water based surface. The Gibraltar Hockey Association is also proud to have had and still has a number of FIH International Umpires, Technical Directors, Umpire Managers and Judges but one of our greatest achievements in this area was to have our most prestigious umpire nominated to umpire in the Olympic Games in London 2012. Gibraltar has also a strong junior base which should keep the sport progressing into the future.

== European history ==
=== Gibraltar Senior Men ===
Lausanne, Switzerland 2020 Championship III
Catania, Italy 2019 Championship III – 3rd (Bronze)
Bratislava, Slovakia 2013 Challenge II – 1st (Gold - Promoted)
Kazan, Russia 2010 Challenge I - Withdrew (Relegated)
Ukraine 1993 Challenge I – 3rd (Bronze)

Hannover, Germany 1978 Challenge I – 12th

=== Gibraltar Junior Men ===
Lisbon, Portugal 2012 Championship III – 4th
Gibraltar 2006 Championship II – 7th (Relegated)
Brest, Bulgaria 2004 Championship III – 2nd (Silver - Promoted)
Cagliari, Italy 2002 Championship II – Withdrew (Relegated)
Oporto, Italy 2000 Championship III – 4th
Padora, Italy 1998 Championship II – 8th (Relegated)

=== Gibraltar Youth Girls (U16) ===
Wattignies, France 2012 Championship III – 2nd (Silver - Promoted)

== Committee members ==
Chairman: Eric Abudarham Snr
Secretary: Charles Bonfante
Treasurer: Christian Laguea
Assistant Treasurer: Eric Abudarham Jnr
Fixture Secretary: Vacant
Assistant Fixture Secretary: Heidi Duo
Youth Development Officer: Stephen Valarino
Umpires Manager: Brian Buckley
Press Officer & Website Administrator: Joseph Borg

Gibraltar National Team Coach: Christian Zammit

== See also ==
- European Hockey Federation
- International Hockey Federation
- FIH Hockey World League
