= Slovakia women's national field hockey team =

Slovakia
- Association: Slovak Hockey Association
- Confederation: EHF (Europe)
- Head Coach: Frank Geers
- Assistant coach(es): Daan Weissink
- Manager: Mariana Mankovecka
- Captain: Natalia Fondrkova

FIH ranking
- Current: 71 (4 March 2025)

The Slovakia national women's field hockey team represents Slovakia in international field hockey tournaments for women. Before 2019 they were not ranked at the FIH World Rankings, because they had been inactive for several years. They generally compete in the lowest tier of the European championships, the Women's EuroHockey Championship III and have never qualified for a world cup nor the Olympics.

== Tournament record ==
EuroHockey Championship II
Year	Host city	Position
2023	Prague, Czech Republic	8th

EuroHockey Championship III
Year	Host city	Position
2005	Prague, Czech Republic	3rd
2007	Zagreb, Croatia	4th
2009	Olten, Switzerland	4th
2011	Vienna, Austria	5th
2013	Athens, Greece	5th
2015	Sveti Ivan Zelina, Croatia	–
2017	Sveti Ivan Zelina, Croatia	–
2019	Lipovci, Slovenia	7th
2021	Lipovci, Slovenia	6th

== See also ==
- Slovakia men's national field hockey team
