= 2013 Women's EuroHockey Championship II =

Field hockey tournament

Tournament details
- Host country: France
- City: Cambrai
- Dates: 21–28 July
- Teams: 8 (from 1 confederation)

Final positions
- Champions: Italy (1st title)
- Runner-up: Poland
- Third place: Azerbaijan

Tournament statistics
- Matches played: 20
- Goals scored: 78 (3.9 per match)

The 2013 Women's EuroHockey Championship II was the 5th edition of the Women's EuroHockey Championship II It was held from the 21st until the 28th of July 2013 in Cambrai, France. The tournament also served as a qualifier for the 2015 EuroHockey Championship with the finalists, Italy and Poland, qualifying.

== Qualified teams ==
Dates	Event	Location	Quotas	Qualifiers
20 - 27 August 2011	2011 EuroHockey Championship	Mönchengladbach, Germany	2	Azerbaijan; Italy
6 - 14 August 2011	2011 EuroHockey Championship II	Poznań, Poland	4	Russia; France; Ukraine; Poland
25 - 31 July 2011	2011 EuroHockey Championship III	Vienna, Austria	2	Lithuania; Austria
Total			8	

== Format ==
The eight teams were split into two groups of four teams. The top two teams advanced to the semifinals to determine the winner in a knockout system. The bottom two teams played in a new group with the teams they did not play against in the group stage. The last two teams were relegated to the EuroHockey Championship III.

== Results ==
All times were local (UTC+2).

=== Preliminary round ===
==== Pool A ====
Pos	Team	Pld	W	D	L	GF	GA	GD	Pts	Qualification
1	Azerbaijan	3	2	1	0	9	2	+7	7	Advanced to Semi-finals
2	France	3	1	1	1	7	7	0	4	Advanced to Semi-finals
3	Ukraine	3	0	3	0	2	2	0	3	Pool C
4	Lithuania	3	0	1	2	3	10	−7	1	Pool C

Source: EuroHockey
Rules for classification: 1) points; 2) goal difference; 3) goals scored; 4) head-to-head result.

22 July 2013
15:00

Ukraine	1–1	Lithuania
Khomenko 19'	Report	Grubliauskaitė 51'

Umpires:
Miskarmalia Ariffin (SGP)
Tatiana Chojnacka (POL)

22 July 2013
17:00

Azerbaijan	4–2	France
Aliyeva 4'; Muradi 8'; Tsiganska 11'; Mammadova 67'	Report	P. Roger 10'; Billore 55'

Umpires:
Elena Eskina (RUS)
Violeta Eismayer (AUT)

24 July 2013
15:00

Ukraine	0–0	Azerbaijan
	Report

Umpires:
Elena Eskina (RUS)
Miskarmalia Ariffin (SGP)

24 July 2013
17:00

France	4–2	Lithuania
	Report

Umpires:
Sabrina Pérez (ITA)
Violeta Eismayer (AUT)

25 July 2013
15:00

Azerbaijan	5–0	Lithuania
	Report

Umpires:
Violeta Eismayer (AUT)
Tatiana Chojnacka (POL)

25 July 2013
17:00

France	1–1	Ukraine
Dutel 24'	Report	Sadova 18'

Umpires:
Sabrina Pérez (ITA)
Mercedes Sánchez (ARG)

==== Pool B ====
Pos	Team	Pld	W	D	L	GF	GA	GD	Pts	Qualification
1	Italy	3	3	0	0	5	1	+4	9	Advanced to Semi-finals
2	Poland	3	1	0	2	6	3	+3	3	Advanced to Semi-finals
3	Russia	3	1	0	2	4	6	−2	3	Pool C
4	Austria	3	1	0	2	4	9	−5	3	Pool C

Source: EuroHockey
Rules for classification: 1) points; 2) goal difference; 3) goals scored; 4) head-to-head result.

22 July 2013
11:00

Italy	1–0	Poland
	Report

Umpires:
Claire Adenot (FRA)
Saadat Zakiyeva (AZE)

22 July 2013
13:00

Russia	2–3	Austria
	Report

Umpires:
Mercedes Sánchez (ARG)
Dovile Lidaite (LTU)

23 July 2013
15:00

Poland	5–0	Austria
	Report

Umpires:
Saadat Zakiyeva (AZE)
Tatyana Kaltypan (UKR)

23 July 2013
17:00

Russia	0–2	Italy
	Report	Ronsisvalli 20', 49'

Umpires:
Dovile Lidaite (LTU)
Mercedes Sánchez (ARG)

25 July 2013
11:00

Italy	2–1	Austria
	Report

Umpires:
Dovile Lidaite (LTU)
Tatyana Kaltypan (UKR)

25 July 2013
13:00

Poland	1–2	Russia
	Report

Umpires:
Saadat Zakiyeva (AZE)
Miskarmalia Ariffin (SGP)

=== Classification round ===
==== Fifth to eighth place classification ====
Points obtained in the preliminary round are carried over into Pool C.

===== Pool C =====
Pos	Team	Pld	W	D	L	GF	GA	GD	Pts	Relegation
5	Austria	3	2	0	1	6	7	−1	6	
6	Ukraine	3	1	1	1	6	3	+3	4	
7	Russia	3	1	1	1	6	6	0	4	Relegated to 2015 EuroHockey Championship III
8	Lithuania	3	0	2	1	4	6	−2	2	Relegated to 2015 EuroHockey Championship III

Source: EuroHockey
Rules for classification: 1) points; 2) goal difference; 3) goals scored; 4) head-to-head result.

27 July 2013
11:00

Lithuania	1–3	Austria
42'	Report	Balek 8'; Sandner 29', 38'

Umpires:
Sabrina Pérez (ITA)
Claire Adenot (FRA)

27 July 2013
13:00

Ukraine	1–2	Russia
Shatokhina 12'	Report	Sorokina 9', 16'

Umpires:
Tatiana Chojnacka (POL)
Saadat Zakiyeva (AZE)

28 July 2013
08:30

Lithuania	2–2	Russia
	Report

Umpires:
Violeta Eismayer (AUT)
Mercedes Sánchez (ARG)

28 July 2013
10:30

Ukraine	4–0	Austria
Derkach 15'; Khilko 27'; Vasyukova 30'; Sadova 55'	Report

Umpires:
Tatiana Chojnacka (POL)
Miskarmalia Ariffin (SGP)

==== First to fourth place classification ====
Semi-finals
27 July 2013
Azerbaijan	3
Poland	4
27 July 2013
Italy	2
France	1

Final
28 July 2013
Poland	0
Italy	5
Third Place
28 July 2013
Azerbaijan (p.s.o.)	4 (4)
France	4 (3)

===== Semi-finals =====
27 July 2013
15:00

Italy	2–1	France
Braconi 26'; Ronsisvalli 41'	Report	Rogeau 69'

Umpires:
Tatyana Kaltypan (UKR)
Mercedes Sánchez (ARG)

27 July 2013
17:30

Azerbaijan	3–4	Poland
Muradi 15', 25'; Tsiganska 51'	Report	Walasek 4', 58'; Rybacha 30'; Wiśniewska 47'

Umpires:
Elena Eskina (RUS)
Miskarmalia Ariffin (SGP)

===== Third and fourth place =====
28 July 2013
13:00

Azerbaijan	4–4	France
	Report
Penalties
	4–3

Umpires:
Dovile Lidaite (LTU)
Tatyana Kaltypan (UKR)

===== Final =====
28 July 2013
15:30

Poland	0–5	Italy
	Report	Wybieralska 21'; Ronsisvalli 29'; Lovagnini 43'; Braconi 44'; Tiddi 70'

Umpires:
Elena Eskina (RUS)
Claire Adenot (FRA)

== Final standings ==
Rank	Team
Gold medal	Italy
Silver medal	Poland
Bronze medal	Azerbaijan
4	France
5	Austria
6	Ukraine
7	Russia
8	Lithuania

== See also ==
- 2013 Men's EuroHockey Championship II
- 2013 Women's EuroHockey Nations Championship
