= Pilar De Biase =

Italian-Argentine field hockey player

Personal information
- Born: 30 October 1996 (age 29) Santa Fe, Argentina

Sport
- Sport: Field hockey
- Position: Forward
- Club: HC Argentia
National team
Years	Team	Caps	Goals
2019–	Italy	8	(1)
Medal record
Women's field hockey
Representing Italy

Pilar De Biase (born 30 October 1996) is an Italian-Argentine field hockey player.

== Personal life ==
Pilar De Biase was born and raised in Santa Fe, Argentina.

== Career ==
=== Club hockey ===
De Biase currently plays in the Italian national league for HC Argentia.

=== National team ===
De Biase made her debut for the Italian national team in 2019 during a test series against Scotland.

In 2021, De Biase returned to the national team for the EuroHockey Championships in Amsterdam. She went on to represent the team again later that year at the European Qualifier for the 2022 FIH World Cup, held in Pisa.

==== International Goals ====
Goal	Date	Location	Opponent	Score	Result	Competition	Ref.
1	21 February 2019	Acqua Acetosa, Roma, Italy	Scotland	2–1	3–1	Test Match	
