= Slovenia women's national field hockey team =

National women's field hockey team of Slovenia

Slovenia
- Association: Slovenian Hockey Federation
- Confederation: EHF (Europe)
- Head Coach: Jozef Kranjec
- Assistant coach(es): Jože Crnko
- Manager: Tomislav Kranjec
- Captain: Andreja Rituper

FIH ranking
- Current: 59 (4 March 2025)

The Slovenia women's national field hockey team represent Slovenia in women's international field hockey competitions and is controlled by the Slovenian Hockey Federation, the governing body for field hockey in Slovenia.

The team competes in the Women's EuroHockey Championship III, the third level of the women's European field hockey championships.

== Tournament record ==
=== EuroHockey Championship III ===
- 2017 – 5th place
- 2019 – 7th place
- 2021 – 7th place

== See also ==
- Slovenia men's national field hockey team
