= HC Lipovci =

Lipovci
- Full name: Hockey Club Lipovci
- Founded: 1965; 61 years ago
- Ground: Lipovci; Slovenia
- President: Franc Maučec
- Head Coach: Mohamed Abubakar
- League: Slovenian Field Hockey League
- Website: https://www.hklipovci.si
Home colours	Away colours	Third colours

Hockey Club Lipovci, commonly referred to as HC Lipovci or simply Lipovci is Slovenian field hockey team and is based in Lipovci, Slovenia. The club was founded in 1965, making it the oldest active field hockey club in Slovenia.

== History ==
Lipovci is a village with a population of about 1,000 people and is situated in the north-eastern part of Slovenia in the middle of the region called Prekmurje and is best known for field hockey. Since 1965 till 1991, the club played in the highest level in former Yugoslavia but never finished on top. At that time club won three junior Yugoslav Championships (U-18). After Slovenia became independent in 1991, the club built an artificial field and the new era in the club's history began. HC Lipovci is today known as the all-time best field hockey club in Slovenia. Last two decades were the best in club history and club became serial champions. HC Lipovci is today known as the all-time best field hockey club in Slovenia.

In the past, the club was also known as HC Lek Lipovci and HC Pliva Lipovci due to sponsorship reasons.

== Honours ==
- 25 times Slovenian field hockey champions
- 12 times Slovenian Cup winners
- 16 times Slovenian indoor hockey champions
- 7 times Central European Interleague Champions
- 1 time Indoor Central European Interleague Champions
- 1st place European Club Championship Challenge - Brest (Belarus) 2004
- 1st place European Club Championship Challenge - Zagreb (Croatia) 2006
- 1st place EuroHockey Indoor Club Challenge II - Gabrovo (Bulgaria) 2008
- 1st place EuroHockey Club Challenge III - Bratislava (Slovakia) 2008
- 1st place EuroHockey Club Challenge II - Lousada (Portugal) 2009
- 1st place EuroHockey Club Challenge II - Athens (Greece) 2012
- 1st place EuroHockey Indoor Club Challenge II - Kanjiža (Serbia) 2014
