= Hungary women's national field hockey team =

Hungary
- Association: Hungarian Hockey Association
- Confederation: EHF (Europe)
- Head Coach: Zsolt Ferenczi
- Assistant coach(es): Csaba Pádár
- Manager: András Láng

FIH ranking
- Current: 48 ▲1 (11 June 2026)

The Hungary women's national field hockey team represent Hungary in women's international field hockey competitions and is controlled by the Hungarian Hockey Association, the governing body for field hockey in Hungary.

The team competes in the Women's EuroHockey Championship III, the third level of the women's European field hockey championships. They have qualified for the 2027 EuroHockey Championship II by finishing second in the 2026 EuroHockey Championship Qualifier II which held in Helsinki.

== Tournament record ==
=== EuroHockey Championship II ===
- 2027 – Qualified

=== EuroHockey Championship III ===
- 2019 – 6th place
- 2021 – Withdrew

== Results and fixtures ==
The following is a list of match results in the last 12 months, as well as any future matches that have been scheduled.

Win Draw Loss Fixture

=== 2026 ===
==== EuroHockey Championship Qualifier II ====
9 July 2026 Pool A	Hungary	0–1	Gibraltar	Helsinki, Finland
9:30		Report	Caetano 53'	Stadium: Velodromi Outdoor

10 July 2026 Pool A	Luxembourg	2–4	Hungary	Helsinki, Finland
9:30	van der Looven 11'; Krüger 51'	Report	Ilkei 2'; Józan 42'; Esperanza 49'; Tóth 59'	Stadium: Velodromi Outdoor

11 July 2026 Pool A	Hungary	11–0	Finland	Helsinki, Finland
11:30	Győrfi 3'; Esperanza 6', 33', 43'; Gyarmati 10'; Den Heijer 24', 56'; Ilkei 28'; Barki 47', 57'; Józan 49'	Report		Stadium: Velodromi Outdoor

12 July 2026 Final	Hungary	1–1 (0–1 p)	Luxembourg	Helsinki, Finland
10:45	Józan 51'	Report	Krüger 40'	Stadium: Velodromi Outdoor
	Penalties
	Gyarmati (penalty shoot-out missed); Józan (penalty shoot-out missed); Esperanza (penalty shoot-out missed); Den Heijer (penalty shoot-out missed); Sutő (penalty shoot-out missed)		(penalty shoot-out missed) Paul; (penalty shoot-out scored) Steffey; (penalty shoot-out missed) Parisis; (penalty shoot-out missed) Krüger

== See also ==
- Hungary men's national field hockey team
