= 2017 Women's EuroHockey Championship III =

Seventh edition of the Women's EuroHockey Championship III

Tournament details
- Host country: Croatia
- City: Sveti Ivan Zelina
- Dates: 30 July - 5 August
- Teams: 8 (from 1 confederation)

Final positions
- Champions: Turkey (1st title)
- Runner-up: Switzerland
- Third place: Lithuania

Tournament statistics
- Matches played: 10
- Goals scored: 81 (8.1 per match)
- Top scorer: (Lithuania) Kristina Poskute (12 goals)

The 2017 Women's EuroHockey Championship III was the 7th edition of the Women's EuroHockey Championship III. It was held in Sveti Ivan Zelina, Croatia from 30 July until 5 August 2017. The tournament also served as a qualifier for the 2019 Women's EuroHockey Championship II, with the winner, Turkey, qualifying.

== Format ==
The five teams were placed in a single pool. Each team played the other four teams once. The final results from those games are also the final standings with the first ranked team qualifying for the 2019 Women's EuroHockey Championship II.

== Results ==
All times are local (UTC+2).

=== Pool A ===
Pos	Team	Pld	W	D	L	GF	GA	GD	Pts	Promotion
1	Turkey	4	3	1	0	14	3	+11	10	EuroHockey Championship II
2	Switzerland	4	3	0	1	26	5	+21	9	
3	Lithuania	4	2	1	1	29	7	+22	7	
4	Croatia (H)	4	1	0	3	10	13	−3	3	
5	Slovenia	4	0	0	4	2	53	−51	0	

Source: FIH
Rules for classification: 1) points; 2) goal difference; 3) goals scored; 4) head-to-head result.
(H) Hosts

30 July 2017
9:00

Turkey	2–2	Lithuania
Güzelal 9'; Gültekin 40'	Report	Poskute 33', 56'

Umpires:
Cathy Wright (WAL)
Fiona Davitt (IRL)

30 July 2017
11:15

Slovenia	0–18	Switzerland
	Report	Wagner 2', 24', 56'; Schwerzmann 7'; S. Wälti 12', 52', 55'; Murer 20'; Haussener 21'; Maillard 26'; E. Trösch 33'; Stomps 36', 51', 58'; El Allaly 37', 58'; T. Trösch 39'; Grütter 39'

Umpires:
Esin Ozturk (TUR)
Alexandra Mahieu (BEL)

31 July 2017
16:15

Switzerland	3–2	Lithuania
Senn 11'; Wagner 23'; S. Wälti 60'	Report	Romašové 33'; Juraitė 37'

Umpires:
Cathy Wright (WAL)
Esin Ozturk (TUR)

31 July 2017
18:30

Croatia	8–1	Slovenia
Makar 3', 49'; Litvic 24', 53', 56'; V. Šomin 35'; Putric 45', 55'	Report	Škrilec 60'

Umpires:
Fiona Davitt (IRL)
Alexandra Mahieu (BEL)

1 August 2017
16:15

Turkey	2–0	Croatia
Gültekin 11'; Çinar 19'	Report

Umpires:
Cathy Wright (WAL)
Alexandra Mahieu (BEL)

2 August 2017
11:15

Lithuania	19–1	Slovenia
Juraitė 2', 36', 49'; Poskute 6', 9', 15', 17', 18', 19', 35', 58'; Vilkaite 13', 24', 40', 57'; Kartanovic 27', 46'; Kuklienė 42'; Bogdanova 56'	Report	Dervaric 3'

Umpires:
Fiona Davitt (IRL)
Esin Ozturk (TUR)

3 August 2017
16:15

Turkey	8–0	Slovenia
Küçükkoç 16', 18', 50'; Gültekin 33', 46'; Köşker 44', 58', 59'	Report

Umpires:
Fiona Davitt (IRL)
Alexandra Mahieu (BEL)

3 August 2017
18:30

Switzerland	4–1	Croatia
A. Wälti 5', 24'; T. Trösch 18'; S. Wälti 49'	Report	Putric 25'

Umpires:
Esin Ozturk (TUR)
Cathy Wright (WAL)

4 August 2017
16:15

Switzerland	1–2	Turkey
T. Trösch 9'	Report	Küçükkoç 10'; Çinar 14'

Umpires:
Cathy Wright (WAL)
Fiona Davitt (IRL)

4 August 2017
18:30

Lithuania	6–1	Croatia
Poskute 1', 45'; Juraitė 6'; Bogdanova 11'; Kartanovic 13'; Chmeliauskaite 34'	Report	Peranic 14'

Umpires:
Esin Ozturk (TUR)
Alexandra Mahieu (BEL)

== See also ==
- 2017 Men's EuroHockey Championship III
- 2017 Women's EuroHockey Championship II
