= Bulgaria women's national field hockey team =

Bulgaria
- Association: Bulgarian Hockey Federation
- Confederation: EHF (Europe)

FIH ranking
- Current: NR (10 March 2026)

The Bulgaria women's national field hockey team represents Bulgaria in women's international field hockey and is controlled by the Bulgarian Hockey Federation, the governing body for field hockey in Bulgaria.

== Tournament record ==
Bulgaria have never qualified for the Summer Olympics, World Cup or the EuroHockey Championship.

== See also ==
- Bulgaria men's national field hockey team
