= Luxembourg women's national field hockey team =

Luxembourg
- Association: Hockey Federation Luxembourg
- Confederation: EHF (Europe)

FIH ranking
- Current: 83 (3 October 2026)

The Luxembourg women's national field hockey team represents Luxembourg in international field hockey competitions. Luxembourg secured their first win in international hockey against Hungary in 2025.

They have qualified for the 2027 EuroHockey Championship II by winning the 2026 EuroHockey Championship Qualifier II in Helsinki, which is their's first ever EuroHockey tournament title.

== Tournament record ==
=== EuroHockey Championship II ===
2027 – Qualified

=== EuroHockey Championship III ===
2025 – 4th place

== Results and fixtures ==
The following is a list of match results in the last 12 months, as well as any future matches that have been scheduled.

Win Draw Loss Fixture

=== 2026 ===
==== Test match ====
| 21 June 2026 Test | Morocco | 3–0 | Luxembourg | Maastricht, Netherlands |
| 12:30 | Verkleij 29', 51'; Addou 37' | Report | | Stadium: Maastrichtse Hockey Club |

==== EuroHockey Championship Qualifier II ====
| 9 July 2026 Pool A | Luxembourg | 3–0 | Finland | Helsinki, Finland |
| 11:45 | Paul 32', 48'; De Cooman 37' | Report | | Stadium: Velodromi Outdoor |

| 10 July 2026 Pool A | Luxembourg | 2–4 | Hungary | Helsinki, Finland |
| 9:30 | van der Looven 11'; Krüger 51' | Report | Ilkei 2'; Józan 42'; Esperanza 49'; Tóth 59' | Stadium: Velodromi Outdoor |

| 11 July 2026 Pool A | Gibraltar | 1–3 | Luxembourg | Helsinki, Finland |
| 09:15 | Olivero 4' | Report | van der Looven 23'; Paul 39'; De Cooman 56' | Stadium: Velodromi Outdoor |

| 12 July 2026 Final | Hungary | 1–1 (0–1 p) | Luxembourg | Helsinki, Finland |
| 10:45 | Józan 51' | Report | Krüger 40' | Stadium: Velodromi Outdoor |
| | Penalties |
| | Gyarmati (penalty shoot-out missed); Józan (penalty shoot-out missed); Esperanza (penalty shoot-out missed); Den Heijer (penalty shoot-out missed); Sutő (penalty shoot-out missed) | | (penalty shoot-out missed) Paul; (penalty shoot-out scored) Steffey; (penalty shoot-out missed) Parisis; (penalty shoot-out missed) Krüger |

== See also ==
- Luxembourg men's national field hockey team
