= Switzerland women's national field hockey team =

Switzerland
- Association: Swiss Hockey Association
- Confederation: EHF (Europe)
- Head Coach: Jorge Nolte
- Assistant coach(es): Linda Haussener
- Manager: Constance van Asselt
- Captain: Stephanie Weber

FIH ranking
- Current: 36 ▲1 (11 June 2026)

World Cup
- Appearances: 2 (first in 1974)
- Best result: 8th (1976)

The Switzerland national women's field hockey team represents Switzerland in international field hockey tournaments for women. They generally compete in the lowest tier of the European championships, the Women's EuroHockey Championship III and have never qualified for the Olympics.

== Tournament record ==
=== World Cup ===
- 1974 – 9th place
- 1976 – 8th place

=== EuroHockey Championship II ===
- 2011 – 7th place

=== EuroHockey Championship III ===
- 2005 – 5th place
- 2007 – (bronze)
- 2009 – (gold)
- 2013 – (bronze)
- 2015 – 5th place
- 2017 – (silver)
- 2019 – (bronze)
- 2021 – (silver)
- 2023 – (silver)

=== Hockey World League ===
- 2016–17 – Round 1

== Results and fixtures ==
The following is a list of match results in the last 12 months, as well as any future matches that have been scheduled.

Win Draw Loss Fixture

=== 2026 ===
==== 2026 Women's FIH Hockey World Cup Qualifiers ====
2 March 2026 Pool A	Chile	6–0	Switzerland	Santiago, Chile
19:45	Urroz 20', 20'; Maldonado 26'; Rojas 42'; Arrieta 44'; Villagrán 48'	Report		Stadium: Estadio Nacional del Hockey Césped Claudia Schüler

4 March 2026 Pool A	France	2–1	Switzerland	Santiago, Chile
13:30	Lahlah 12'; Le Nindre 37'	Report	Weber 16'	Stadium: Estadio Nacional del Hockey Césped Claudia Schüler

5 March 2026 Pool A	Australia	3–0	Switzerland	Santiago, Chile
17:30	Flynn 8', 51'; Howell 56'	Report		Stadium: Estadio Nacional del Hockey Césped Claudia Schüler

7 March 2026 5/8 Classification	Malaysia	3–1	Switzerland	Santiago, Chile
11:15	Mohd 25'; Sukri 26'; Azhar 37'	Report	Stomps 43'	Stadium: Estadio Nacional del Hockey Césped Claudia Schüler

8 March 2026 7/8 Classification	Canada	1–2	Switzerland	Santiago, Chile
09:00	Girgis 33'	Report	Pöhler 25'; Trösch 36'	Stadium: Estadio Nacional del Hockey Césped Claudia Schüler

==== 2026 Women's EuroHockey Championship Qualifier ====
9 July 2026 QF	Switzerland	1–3	Ukraine	Prague, Czech Republic
11:00	Stomps 23'	Report	Honcharenko 2'; Leonova 6', 49'

10 July 2026 5/8 Classification	Switzerland	7–0	Croatia	Prague, Czech Republic
15:30	Stomps 8', 55'; Trösch 12', 48'; Härtsch 17'; Pöhler 31'; Hipp 58'	Report

12 July 2026 5/6 Classification	Switzerland	3–2	Lithuania	Prague, Czech Republic
11:30	Trösch 13'; Stomps 23', 32'	Report	Juraitė 35'; Soto 36'

== See also ==
- Switzerland men's national field hockey team
