= Gibraltar women's national field hockey team =

Gibraltar
- Association: Gibraltar Hockey
- Confederation: EHF (Europe)

FIH ranking
- Current: 81 (3 October 2026)

The Gibraltar women's national field hockey team represents Gibraltar in international women's field hockey and is controlled by Gibraltar Hockey.They made their first international appearance in 2023.

They clinched bronze in the recently concluded 2026 EuroHockey Championship Qualifier II

== Tournament record ==
=== EuroHockey Championship III ===
- 2023 – (bronze)
- 2025 – Withdrawn

== Results and fixtures ==
The following is a list of match results in the last 12 months, as well as any future matches that have been scheduled.

Win Draw Loss Fixture

=== 2026 ===
9 June 2026 Test 1	Gibraltar	0–1	Morocco	Gibraltar
19:00		Report	Chouih 31'	Stadium: Bayside Sports Complex

10 June 2026 Test 2	Gibraltar	0–2	Morocco	Gibraltar
19:00		Report	Addou 12'; Chouih 48'	Stadium: Bayside Sports Complex

==== EuroHockey Championship Qualifier II ====
9 July 2026 Pool A	Hungary	0–1	Gibraltar	Helsinki, Finland
9:30		Report	Caetano 53'	Stadium: Velodromi Outdoor

10 July 2026 Pool A	Gibraltar	3–0	Finland	Helsinki, Finland
11:45	Elliot 9'; Silva 22'; Chellaram 59'	Report		Stadium: Velodromi Outdoor

11 July 2026 Pool A	Gibraltar	1–3	Luxembourg	Helsinki, Finland
09:15	Olivero 4'	Report	van der Looven 23'; Paul 39'; De Cooman 56'	Stadium: Velodromi Outdoor

12 July 2026 Third place match	Gibraltar	6–0	Finland	Helsinki, Finland
08:30	Olivero 4'; Bossano-Annes 13'; Caetano 37'; Brooks 50'; Olivero 52'; Casciaro 56'	Report		Stadium: Velodromi Outdoor

== See also ==
- Gibraltar men's national field hockey team
