= Finland women's national field hockey team =

Finland
- Association: Finnish Hockey Association
- Confederation: EHF (Europe)
- Head Coach: Markku Heino
- Manager: Jonna Forsblom

FIH ranking
- Current: 88 (3 October 2026)

The Finland women's national field hockey team represents Finland in women's international field hockey and is controlled by the Finnish Hockey Association the governing body for field hockey in Finland. The team is coached by Markku Heino.

They finished 4th as hosts in the 2026 EuroHockey Championship Qualifier II.

== Tournament record ==
- 2026 EuroHockey Championship Qualifier II – 4th

== Results and fixtures ==
The following is a list of match results in the last 12 months, as well as any future matches that have been scheduled.

Win Draw Loss Fixture

=== 2026 ===
==== EuroHockey Championship Qualifier II ====
9 July 2026 Pool A	Luxembourg	3–0	Finland	Helsinki, Finland
11:45	Paul 32', 48'; De Cooman 37'	Report		Stadium: Velodromi Outdoor

10 July 2026 Pool A	Gibraltar	3–0	Finland	Helsinki, Finland
11:45	Elliot 9'; Silva 22'; Chellaram 59'	Report		Stadium: Velodromi Outdoor

11 July 2026 Pool A	Hungary	11–0	Finland	Helsinki, Finland
11:30	Győrfi 3'; Esperanza 6', 33', 43'; Gyarmati 10'; Den Heijer 24', 56'; Ilkei 28'; Barki 47', 57'; Józan 49'	Report		Stadium: Velodromi Outdoor

12 July 2026 Third place match	Gibraltar	6–0	Finland	Helsinki, Finland
08:30	Olivero 4'; Bossano-Annes 13'; Caetano 37'; Brooks 50'; Olivero 52'; Casciaro 56'	Report		Stadium: Velodromi Outdoor

== See also ==
- Finland men's national field hockey team
