= Turkey women's national field hockey team =

Women's field hockey team

Turkey
- Association: Turkish Hockey Federation
- Confederation: EHF (Europe)
- Head Coach: İismail Yildiz
- Assistant coach(es): Gokhan Bilici
- Manager: Mustafa Çakir
- Captain: Kübra Güzelal

FIH ranking
- Current: 34 ▲1 (11 June 2026)

The Turkey women's national field hockey team is organized by the Turkish Hockey Federation and represents Turkey in international women's field hockey competitions.

== History ==
Their first match was played on 2005, losing 0-10 to Croatia and 2007.

== Tournament record ==
=== EuroHockey Championship ===
Women's EuroHockey Championship									Qualification							
Year	Rank	M	W	D	L	GF	GA	GD	M	W	D	L	GF	GA	GD	Link
(France) 1984	DNE								DNE							
(England) 1987	DNE								DNE							
(Belgium) 1991	DNE								DNE							
(Netherlands) 1995	DNE								DNE							
(Germany) 1999	DNE								DNE							
(Spain) 2003	DNE								DNE							
(Republic of Ireland) 2005	DNQ								5	0	0	5	5	46	-41	Link
(England) 2007	DNQ								4	0	1	3	2	25	-23	Link
(Netherlands) 2009	DNQ								Withdraw							Link
(Germany) 2011	DNQ								5	2	0	3	7	36	-29	Link
(Belgium) 2013	DNQ								5	2	0	3	7	9	-2	Link
(England) 2015	DNQ								4	2	0	2	8	8	0	Link
(Netherlands) 2017	DNQ								4	3	1	0	14	3	+11	Link
(Belgium) 2019	DNQ								5	0	0	5	6	31	-25	Link
(Netherlands) 2021	DNQ								5	3	0	2	21	6	+15	Link
(Germany) 2023	DNQ								3	0	1	2	1	10	-9	Link
(Germany) 2025	DNQ								2	0	0	2	3	11	-8	Link
Total	0/16	0	0	0	0	0	0	0	42	12	3	27	74	195	-121	Link

=== EuroHockey Championship II ===
- 2019 – 8th place

=== EuroHockey Championship III ===
- 2005 – 8th place
- 2007 – 6th place
- 2009 – Withdraw
- 2011 – 4th place
- 2013 – 4th place
- 2015 – (bronze)
- 2017 – (gold)
- 2021 – (bronze)
- 2023 – (gold)
- 2025 – (silver)

=== Qualifiers ===
- 2023 – 14th place
- 2025 – 12th place

=== Hockey World League ===
Women's FIH Hockey World League
Year	Rank	M	W	D	L	GF	GA	GD
2012–13	Round 1	5	0	0	5	3	50	-47
2014–15	37th place	9	0	0	9	5	53	-48
2016–17	31st place	10	1	2	7	10	40	-30
Total	3/3	24	1	2	21	18	143	-125

=== FIH Hockey Series ===
- 2018–19 – First round

=== Women's EuroHockey U21 Championship ===
1. 2006 Women's EuroHockey Junior Championship III
2. 2008 Women's EuroHockey Junior Championship III
3. 2012 Women's EuroHockey Junior Championship III
4. 2014 Women's EuroHockey Junior Championship II
5. 2017 Women's EuroHockey Junior Championship II
6. 2019 Women's EuroHockey Junior Championship II
7. 2022 Women's EuroHockey Junior Championship III
8. 2024 Women's EuroHockey Junior Championship II

==== Results ====
===== 2024 =====
1. Turkey 1-2 Poland
2. Turkey 2-5 Ukraine
3. Turkey 0-4 Scotland
4. Turkey 1-4 Poland

GF 4 / GA 15 / GD -8

== Results and fixtures ==
The following is a list of match results in the last 12 months, as well as any future matches that have been scheduled.

Win Draw Loss Fixture

=== 2026 ===
9 July 2026 EU Championship Qualifiers QF	Austria	5–1	Turkey	Prague, Czech Republic
15:30	Proksch 36'; Pultar 41'; Hahnenkamp 43'; Haselsteiner 46'; Kern 56'	Report	Okumuş 17'

10 July 2026 EU Championship Qualifiers 5/8 Classification	Turkey	0–2	Lithuania	Prague, Czech Republic
17:45		Report	Soto 7'; Jakovleva 51'

12 July 2026 EU Championship Qualifiers 7/8 Classification	Croatia	0–2	Turkey	Prague, Czech Republic
09:15		Report	Satilmiş 45', 58'

== See also ==
- Turkey women's national indoor hockey team
- Turkey men's national field hockey team
