= Croatia women's national field hockey team =

Croatia
- Association: Croatian Hockey Federation
- Confederation: EHF (Europe)
- Head Coach: Hrvoje Abramović
- Manager: Slaven Zlatar
- Captain: Una Litvic

FIH ranking
- Current: 62 (11 June 2026)

The Croatia women's national field hockey team represents Croatia in women's international field hockey competitions and is controlled by the Croatian Hockey Federation, the governing body for field hockey in Croatia.

The team competes in the Women's EuroHockey Championship III, the third level of the women's European field hockey championships. As of March 2024, the Croatia women's field hockey team is placed 55th in the FIH world ranking.

== Tournament record ==
=== EuroHockey Championship III ===
- 2005 – 4th place
- 2007 – 5th place
- 2015 – 4th place
- 2017 – 4th place
- 2019 – 4th place
- 2021 – 4th place
- 2023 – 4th place

== Results and fixtures ==
The following is a list of match results in the last 12 months, as well as any future matches that have been scheduled.

Win Draw Loss Fixture

=== 2026 ===
9 July 2026 EU Championship Qualifiers QF	Poland	3–0	Croatia	Prague, Czech Republic
13:15	Rymer 3'; Kucharska 34'; Zimmermann 35'	Report

10 July 2026 EU Championship Qualifiers 5/8 Classification	Switzerland	7–0	Croatia	Prague, Czech Republic
15:30	Stomps 8', 55'; Trösch 12', 48'; Härtsch 17'; Pöhler 31'; Hipp 58'	Report

12 July 2026 EU Championship Qualifiers 7/8 Classification	Croatia	0–2	Turkey	Prague, Czech Republic
09:15		Report	Satilmiş 45', 58'

== See also ==
- Croatia men's national field hockey team
