= Lipovci =

Village in Prekmurje, Slovenia

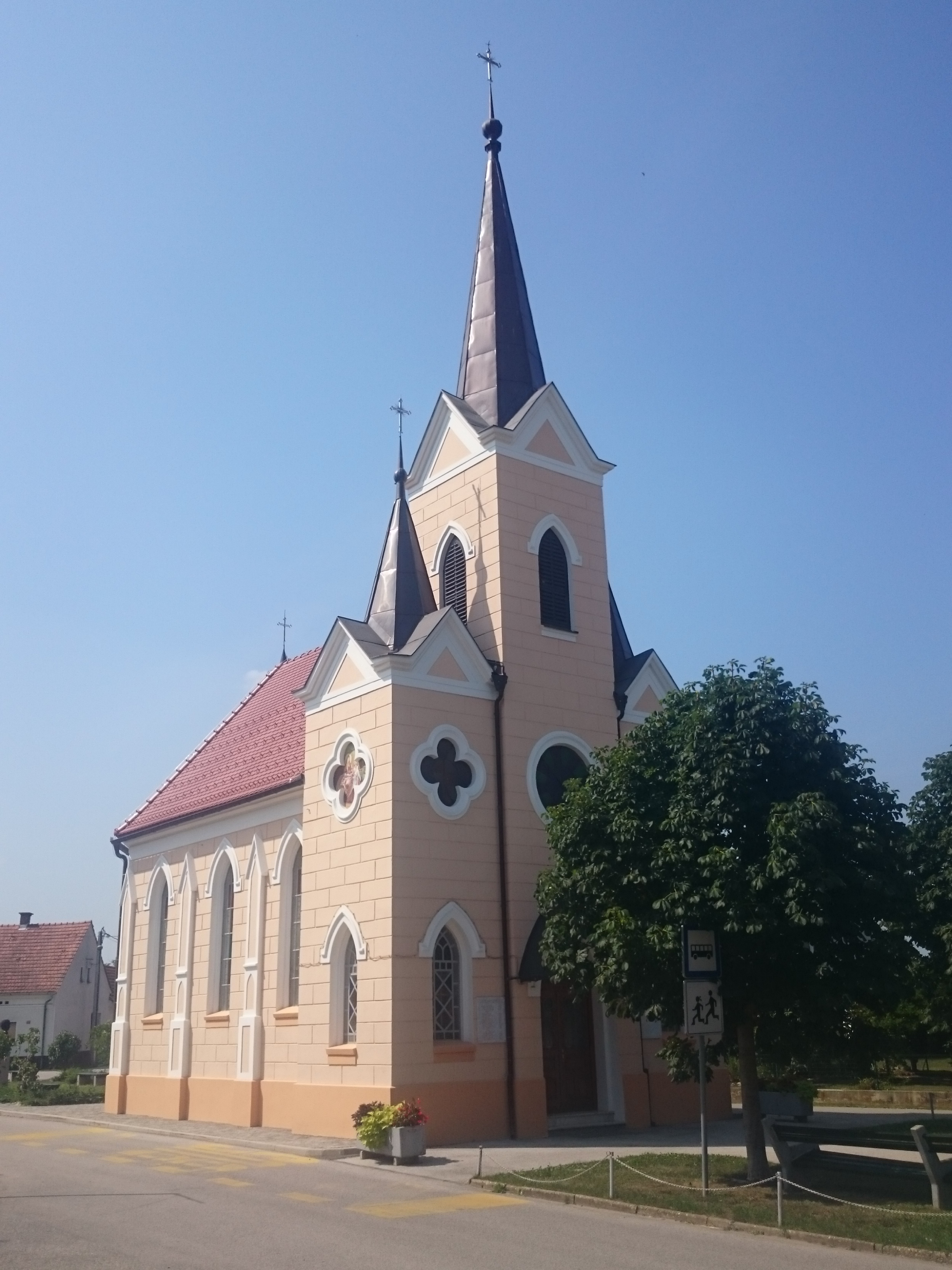

- Location in Slovenia
- Coordinates: 46°37′33.19″N 16°13′42.93″E
- Country: Slovenia
- Traditional region: Prekmurje
- Statistical region: Mura
- Municipality: Beltinci

Area
  - Total: 7.068 km^{2} (2.729 sq mi)
- Elevation: 180 m (590 ft)

Population (2026)
  - Total: 1,043
  - Density: 148/km^{2} (380/sq mi)

Lipovci (pronounced [liˈpoːu̯tsi]; Hungarian: Hársliget) is a village in the Municipality of Beltinci in the Prekmurje region of northeastern Slovenia. In January 2026, the population was 1,043.

There is a small Neo-Gothic chapel in the settlement. It was built in the early 20th century and is dedicated to Saints Peter and Paul. It has a belfry above the entrance and two smaller turrets on either corner. It belongs to the Parish of Beltinci.
