= 2016–17 Women's FIH Hockey World League Round 2 =

Field hockey tournament

The 2016–17 Women's FIH Hockey World League Round 2 was held from January to April 2017. A total of 24 teams competing in 3 events took part in this round of the tournament playing for 8 berths in the Semifinals, to be played in June and July 2017.

== Qualification ==
9 teams ranked between 12th and 20th in the FIH World Rankings current at the time of seeking entries for the competition qualified automatically. However, Belgium was chosen to host a Semifinal, hence exempt from Round 2 and leaving 8 teams qualified. Additionally 15 teams qualified from Round 1, as well as one nation that did not meet ranking criteria and was exempt from Round 1 to host a Round 2 tournament. The following 24 teams, shown with final pre-tournament rankings, competed in this round of the tournament.

Dates	Event	Location	Quotas	Qualifier(s)
	Ranked 12th to 20th in the FIH World Rankings		8	India (12); Ireland (16); Spain (10); Italy (15); Scotland (17); Belarus (20); Azerbaijan (26); Canada (18)
	Host nation		1	Malaysia (22)
9–17 April 2016	2016–17 FIH Hockey World League Round 1	Singapore	3	Thailand (31); Kazakhstan (33); Singapore (43); Hong Kong (38)
28 June–2 July 2016	2016–17 FIH Hockey World League Round 1	Suva, Fiji	1	~~Fiji~~ (42)
30 August–4 September 2016	2016–17 FIH Hockey World League Round 1	Prague, Czech Republic	3	Czech Republic (25); Poland (21); Ukraine (35)
9–11 September 2016	2016–17 FIH Hockey World League Round 1	Accra, Ghana	1	Ghana (27)
13–18 September 2016	2016–17 FIH Hockey World League Round 1	Douai, France	3	Russia (28); Wales (32); France (24)
27 September–2 October 2016	2016–17 FIH Hockey World League Round 1	Salamanca, Mexico	2	Mexico (30); Trinidad and Tobago (34)
1–9 October 2016	2016–17 FIH Hockey World League Round 1	Chiclayo, Peru	2	Uruguay (23); Chile (19)
Total			24	

== Kuala Lumpur ==
- Kuala Lumpur, Malaysia, 14–22 January 2017.

All times are local (UTC+8).

=== First round ===
==== Pool A ====
Pos	Team	Pld	W	PW	PL	L	GF	GA	GD	Pts	Qualification
1	Italy	3	3	0	0	0	17	0	+17	9	Quarterfinals
2	Wales	3	2	0	0	1	10	3	+7	6	Quarterfinals
3	Thailand	3	1	0	0	2	4	8	−4	3	Quarterfinals
4	Singapore	3	0	0	0	3	0	20	−20	0	Quarterfinals

Source: FIH
Rules for classification: 1) points; 2) goal difference; 3) goals scored; 4) head-to-head result.

14 January 2017
13:45

Italy	3–0	Wales
Mastronardi 14'; Braconi 26', 33'	Report

Umpires:
Vilma Bagdanskienė (LTU)
Tang Shi Him (HKG)

14 January 2017
16:00

Thailand	4–0	Singapore
Sanpoung 7', 58'; Khuiklang 52'; Wongkeaw 57'	Report

Umpires:
Ayu Zainuddin (MAS)
Amina Dyussembekova (KAZ)

15 January 2017
18:15

Wales	7–0	Singapore
Marke-Jones 8'; Daley 14', 31'; Richards 45', 58'; Welsford 54'; Jones 60'	Report

Umpires:
Jo Cumming (NZL)
Christine Reid (IRL)

15 January 2017
20:30

Thailand	0–5	Italy
	Report	Singh 9'; Casale 27'; Braconi 34'; Garraffo 40'; Wybieralska 51'

Umpires:
Tang Shi Him (HKG)
Ayu Zainuddin (MAS)

17 January 2017
13:45

Italy	9–0	Singapore
Wybieralska 17', 49'; Tiddi 20'; Mastronardi 26'; Garraffo 37'; Mirabella 38'; Braconi 40', 44', 59'	Report

Umpires:
Kim Yoon-seon (KOR)
Amina Dyussembekova (KAZ)

17 January 2017
16:00

Wales	3–0	Thailand
Blyth 28'; Bingham 50'; Laity 51'	Report

Umpires:
Tang Shi Him (HKG)
Christine Reid (IRL)

==== Pool B ====
Pos	Team	Pld	W	PW	PL	L	GF	GA	GD	Pts	Qualification
1	Ireland	3	3	0	0	0	24	1	+23	9	Quarterfinals
2	Malaysia (H)	3	2	0	0	1	23	3	+20	6	Quarterfinals
3	Kazakhstan	3	0	1	0	2	2	26	−24	2	Quarterfinals
4	Hong Kong	3	0	0	1	2	1	20	−19	1	Quarterfinals

Source: FIH
Rules for classification: 1) points; 2) goal difference; 3) goals scored; 4) head-to-head result.
(H) Host

14 January 2017
18:15

Ireland	12–0	Kazakhstan
Evans 5', 20', 35'; O'Flanagan 6', 19', 40', 58'; Mullan 48'; Watkins 48'; Barry 51'; Pinder 52'; Daly 58'	Report

Umpires:
Jo Cumming (NZL)
Kim Yoon-seon (KOR)

14 January 2017
20:30

Malaysia	9–0	Hong Kong
Mansur 17'; Ruhani 24'; Silin 29'; Onn 41'; Ali 46'; Rashid 48', 56', 60'; Sukri 49'	Report

Umpires:
Cookie Tan (SGP)
Ornpimol Kittiteerasopon (THA)

16 January 2017
18:15

Kazakhstan	1–1	Hong Kong
Domashneva 6'	Report	Chan C. 9'
Penalties
Sabazova (penalty shoot-out scored); Idrissova (penalty shoot-out missed); Chepkassova (penalty shoot-out scored)	2–0	(penalty shoot-out missed) Lo; (penalty shoot-out missed) McNeil; (penalty shoot-out missed) Cheng; (penalty shoot-out missed) Lau

Umpires:
Vilma Bagdanskienė (LTU)
Alessia Bavaro (ITA)

16 January 2017
20:30

Malaysia	1–2	Ireland
Onn 54'	Report	Watkins 5'; O'Flanagan 52'

Umpires:
Kim Yoon-seon (KOR)
Cookie Tan (SIN)

17 January 2017
18:15

Ireland	10–0	Hong Kong
Upton 18'; Evans 34'; Watkins 41'; O'Flanagan 42', 48'; Mullan 43', 53'; Barry 49'; Pinder 52'; Daly 55'	Report

Umpires:
Jo Cumming (NZL)
Alessia Bavaro (ITA)

17 January 2017
20:30

Kazakhstan	1–13	Malaysia
Domashneva 7'	Report	Mansur 5'; Ali 14'; Sukri 16', 24', 59'; Rashid 18'; Silin 26', 46'; Said 28', 54'; Sumantri 40'; Onn 44'; Mohd 49'

Umpires:
Vilma Bagdanskienė (LTU)
Ornpimol Kittiteerasopon (THA)

=== Second round ===
==== Bracket ====
Quarterfinals
19 January
Italy	7
Hong Kong	0
19 January
Malaysia	3
Thailand	0
19 January
Wales	2
Kazakhstan	1
19 January
Ireland	10
Singapore	0

Semifinals
21 January
Italy	2 (1)
Malaysia (p.s.o.)	2 (2)
21 January
Wales	0
Ireland	2

Final
22 January
Malaysia	0
Ireland	3
Third place
22 January
Italy	3
Wales	1

5–8th place bracket

5–8th place semifinals
20 January
Hong Kong	0
Thailand	3
20 January
Kazakhstan	1
Singapore	4

Fifth place
22 January
Thailand (p.s.o.)	0 (3)
Singapore	0 (1)
Seventh place
22 January
Hong Kong	2
Kazakhstan	3

==== Quarterfinals ====
19 January 2017
13:45

Ireland	10–0	Singapore
Carroll 7'; Barry 14'; O'Flanagan 22', 43', 56'; Upton 23', 25', 45'; Daly 46'; Mullan 57'	Report

Umpires:
Ayu Zainuddin (MAS)
Alessia Bavaro (ITA)

19 January 2017
16:00

Italy	7–0	Hong Kong
Braconi 2', 11', 56'; Bendinelli 24'; Tiddi 25'; Mirabella 37'; Mastronardi 50'	Report

Umpires:
Christine Reid (IRL)
Amina Dyussembekova (KAZ)

19 January 2017
18:00

Wales	2–1	Kazakhstan
Westwood 19'; Wilkinson 56'	Report	Sabazova 41'

Umpires:
Tang Shi Him (HKG)
Cookie Tan (SGP)

19 January 2017
20:30

Malaysia	3–0	Thailand
Ruhani 38'; Sumantri 56'; Rashid 60'	Report

Umpires:
Vilma Bagdanskienė (LTU)
Jo Cumming (NZL)

==== Fifth to eighth place classification ====
===== Crossover =====
20 January 2017
18:15

Hong Kong	0–3	Thailand
	Report	Khuiklang 9'; Sakunpithak 37'; Sanpoung 55'

Umpires:
Kim Yoon-seon (KOR)
Cookie Tan (SGP)

20 January 2017
20:30

Kazakhstan	1–4	Singapore
Mahanova 55'	Report	Ong Y. 3'; Toh 9'; T. Ong 29', 33'

Umpires:
Ornpimol Kittiteerasopon (THA)
Ayu Zainuddin (MAS)

===== Seventh and eighth place =====
22 January 2017
13:45

Hong Kong	2–3	Kazakhstan
Chan C. 40'; T. Chan 60'	Report	Sabazova 2'; Khonina 32'; Idirissova 49'

Umpires:
Kim Yoon-seon (KOR)
Ornpimol Kittiteerasopon (THA)

===== Fifth and sixth place =====
22 January 2017
16:00

Thailand	0–0	Singapore
	Report
Penalties
Samanso (penalty shoot-out scored); Khuiklang (penalty shoot-out scored); Wongkeaw (penalty shoot-out missed); Piresram (penalty shoot-out scored)	3–1	(penalty shoot-out missed) Chua; (penalty shoot-out missed) Tan; (penalty shoot-out scored) Ong Y. (penalty shoot-out missed) Saban

Umpires:
Jo Cumming (NZL)
Ayu Zainuddin (MAS)

==== First to fourth place classification ====
===== Semifinals =====
21 January 2017
18:15

Ireland	2–0	Wales
O'Byrne 27'; O'Flanagan 28'	Report

Umpires:
Jo Cumming (NZL)
Kim Yoon-seon (KOR)

21 January 2017
20:30

Italy	2–2	Malaysia
Garraffo 10'; Wybieralska 18'	Report	Silin 13'; Onn 26'
Penalties
Braconi (penalty shoot-out missed); Casale (penalty shoot-out missed); Singh (penalty shoot-out missed); Mirabella (penalty shoot-out scored); Tiddi (penalty shoot-out missed); Braconi (penalty shoot-out missed)	1–2	(penalty shoot-out missed) Rashid; (penalty shoot-out missed) Othman; (penalty shoot-out missed) Saiuti; (penalty shoot-out scored) Sukri; (penalty shoot-out missed) Said; (penalty shoot-out scored) Sukri

Umpires:
Vilma Bagdanskienė (LTU)
Tang Shi Him (HKG)

===== Third and fourth place =====
22 January 2017
18:15

Wales	1–3	Italy
French 35'	Report	Traverso 25'; Braconi 33', 54'

Umpires:
Cookie Tan (SIN)
Christine Reid (IRL)

===== Final =====
22 January 2017
20:30

Ireland	3–0	Malaysia
O'Flanagan 7'; Mullan 10'; Wilson 35'	Report

Umpires:
Vilma Bagdanskienė (LTU)
Tang Shi Him (HKG)

=== Final ranking ===
Qualified for Semifinals

Rank	Team
1	Ireland
2	Malaysia
3	Italy
4	Wales
5	Thailand
6	Singapore
7	Kazakhstan
8	Hong Kong

== Valencia ==
- Valencia, Spain, 4–12 February 2017.

All times are local (UTC+1).

=== First round ===
==== Pool A ====
Pos	Team	Pld	W	PW	PL	L	GF	GA	GD	Pts	Qualification
1	Spain (H)	3	3	0	0	0	19	5	+14	9	Quarterfinals
2	Czech Republic	3	2	0	0	1	8	7	+1	6	Quarterfinals
3	Russia	3	1	0	0	2	13	11	+2	3	Quarterfinals
4	Turkey	3	0	0	0	3	0	17	−17	0	Quarterfinals

Source: FIH
Rules for classification: 1) points; 2) goal difference; 3) goals scored; 4) head-to-head result.
(H) Host

4 February 2017
10:30

Czech Republic	4–0	Turkey
Laciná 36'; Bížová 54'; Capouchová 57'; Mejzlíková 59'	Report

Umpires:
Karine Alves (FRA)
Urszula Łapawa (POL)

4 February 2017
13:00

Spain	8–4	Russia
B. García 6'; Iglesias 11', 38'; Oliva 18'; Bonastre 23', 45'; López 46'; Jiménez 53'	Report	Sadovaia 22', 25', 49', 60'

Umpires:
Cynthia Clement (GHA)
Katie Howie (SCO)

5 February 2017
10:30

Russia	7–0	Turkey
Osipova 15', 56'; Borisova 18'; Svezhentseva 29'; Fedorova 45'; Eroshina 48'; Sadovaia 49'	Report

Umpires:
Olena Klymenko (UKR)
Urszula Łapawa (POL)

5 February 2017
13:00

Czech Republic	1–5	Spain
Hanzlová 59'	Report	Gine 11'; Torres-Quevedo 49'; Cano 53'; Salvatella 56'; B. García 57'

Umpires:
Ersin Öztürk (TUR)
Claire Druijts (NED)

7 February 2017
13:00

Spain	6–0	Turkey
Bonastre 13', 17'; Torres-Quevedo 41'; Petchame 43'; López 54'; B. García 60'	Report

Umpires:
Cynthia Clement (GHA)
Claire Druijts (NED)

7 February 2017
15:30

Russia	2–3	Czech Republic
Sadovaia 5', 23'	Report	Decsyová 3'; Haklová 33'; Reichlová 41'

Umpires:
Gemma Calderón (ESP)
Karine Alves (FRA)

==== Pool B ====
Pos	Team	Pld	W	PW	PL	L	GF	GA	GD	Pts	Qualification
1	Poland	3	2	0	0	1	6	3	+3	6	Quarterfinals
2	Scotland	3	2	0	0	1	3	2	+1	6	Quarterfinals
3	Ukraine	3	1	0	1	1	6	6	0	4	Quarterfinals
4	Ghana	3	0	1	0	2	2	6	−4	2	Quarterfinals

Source: FIH
Rules for classification: 1) points; 2) goal difference; 3) goals scored; 4) head-to-head result.

4 February 2017
15:30

Poland	3–2	Ukraine
Rybacha 18'; Zagajska 33', 48'	Report	Kernoz 15', 59'

Umpires:
Gemma Calderón (ESP)
Štěpánka Šmídová (CZE)

4 February 2017
18:00

Scotland	1–0	Ghana
Costello 17'	Report

Umpires:
Claire Druijts (NED)
Anastasiya Bogoliubova (RUS)

5 February 2017
15:30

Poland	0–1	Scotland
	Report	Collins 8'

Umpires:
Anastasiya Bogoliubova (RUS)
Gemma Calderón (ESP)

5 February 2017
18:00

Ghana	2–2	Ukraine
Bamfo 39'; Amoako 60'	Report	Ponomarenko 40'; Stetsenko 54'
Penalties
Korwu (penalty shoot-out missed); Opoku (penalty shoot-out missed); Amoako (penalty shoot-out missed); Boakye (penalty shoot-out scored); Umaru (penalty shoot-out scored)	2–1	(penalty shoot-out missed) Shokalenko; (penalty shoot-out missed) Kernoz; (penalty shoot-out scored) Ponomarenko; (penalty shoot-out missed) Honcharenko; (penalty shoot-out missed) Stetsenko

Umpires:
Katie Howie (SCO)
Karine Alves (FRA)

7 February 2017
10:30

Ghana	0–3	Poland
	Report	Rybacha 19'; Polewczak 42'; Skoraszewska 51'

Umpires:
Olena Klymenko (UKR)
Ersin Öztürk (TUR)

7 February 2017
18:00

Scotland	1–2	Ukraine
Robertson 7'	Report	Ponomarenko 49'; Vorushylo 60+'

Umpires:
Štěpánka Šmídová (CZE)
Urszula Łapawa (POL)

=== Second round ===
==== Bracket ====
Quarterfinals
9 February
Spain	7
Ghana	0
9 February
Scotland	2
Russia	1
9 February
Czech Republic	0
Ukraine	1
9 February
Poland	2
Turkey	1

Semifinals
11 February
Spain	2
Scotland	1
11 February
Ukraine	0
Poland	3

Final
12 February
Spain	2
Poland	0
Third place
12 February
Scotland	1
Ukraine	0

5–8th place bracket

5–8th place semifinals
11 February
Ghana	0
Russia	6
11 February
Czech Republic	6
Turkey	2

Fifth place
12 February
Russia	2
Czech Republic	3
Seventh place
12 February
Ghana	2
Turkey	3

==== Quarterfinals ====
9 February 2017
10:30

Scotland	2–1	Russia
Brodie 2'; Collins 22'	Report	Osipova 43'

Umpires:
Karine Alves (FRA)
Claire Druijts (NED)

9 February 2017
13:00

Spain	7–0	Ghana
Salvatella 14'; López 15', 26', 36'; Pérez 21'; Gine 28'; Cano 54'	Report

Umpires:
Ersin Öztürk (TUR)
Urszula Łapawa (POL)

9 February 2017
15:30

Czech Republic	0–1	Ukraine
	Report	Moroz 50'

Umpires:
Anastasiya Bogoliubova (RUS)
Katie Howie (SCO)

9 February 2017
18:00

Poland	2–1	Turkey
Zagajska 47'; Wiśniewska 51'	Report	Küçükkoç 60'

Umpires:
Olena Klymenko (UKR)
Štěpánka Šmídová (CZE)

==== Fifth to eighth place classification ====
===== Crossover =====
11 February 2017
09:00

Ghana	0–6	Russia
	Report	Sadovaia 22', 36', 60'; Borisova 41'; Eroshina 47', 48'

Umpires:
Ersin Öztürk (TUR)
Gemma Calderón (ESP)

11 February 2017
11:30

Czech Republic	6–2	Turkey
Capouchová 11'; Haklová 14', 50', 60'; Reichlová 21'; Decsyová 54'	Report	Küçükkoç 2'; Çınar 12'

Umpires:
Urszula Łapawa (POL)
Anastasiya Bogoliubova (RUS)

===== Seventh and eighth place =====
12 February 2017
09:00

Ghana	2–3	Turkey
Umaru 7'; Coffie 17'	Report	Küçükkoç 5', 54'; Güzelal 37'

Umpires:
Katie Howie (SCO)
Štěpánka Šmídová (CZE)

===== Fifth and sixth place =====
12 February 2017
11:30

Russia	2–3	Czech Republic
Frdorova 52'; Sadovaia 57'	Report	Laciná 7'; Haklová 14'; Babická 42'

Umpires:
Cynthia Clement (GHA)
Claire Druijts (NED)

==== First to fourth place classification ====
===== Semifinals =====
11 February 2017
14:00

Ukraine	0–3	Poland
	Report	Zagajska 4'; Strubbe 29'; Sławińska 36'

Umpires:
Karine Alves (FRA)
Štěpánka Šmídová (CZE)

11 February 2017
16:30

Spain	2–1	Scotland
Oliva 21', 35'	Report	Costello 60'

Umpires:
Claire Druijts (NED)
Olena Klymenko (UKR)

===== Third and fourth place =====
12 February 2017
14:00

Scotland	1–0	Ukraine
Howie 30'	Report

Umpires:
Karine Alves (FRA)
Gemma Calderón (ESP)

===== Final =====
12 February 2017
16:30

Spain	2–0	Poland
Pérez 9'; B. García 56'	Report

Umpires:
Olena Klymenko (UKR)
Anastasiya Bogoliubova (RUS)

=== Final ranking ===
Qualified for Semifinals

Rank	Team
1	Spain
2	Poland
3	Scotland
4	Ukraine
5	Czech Republic
6	Russia
7	Turkey
8	Ghana

== West Vancouver ==
- West Vancouver, Canada, 1–9 April 2017.

All times are local (UTC−8).

=== First round ===
==== Pool A ====
Pos	Team	Pld	W	PW	PL	L	GF	GA	GD	Pts	Qualification
1	India	2	1	1	0	0	3	2	+1	5	Semifinals
2	Uruguay	2	1	0	1	0	5	4	+1	4	Quarterfinals
3	Belarus	2	0	0	0	2	2	4	−2	0	Quarterfinals

Source: FIH
Rules for classification: 1) points; 2) goal difference; 3) goals scored; 4) head-to-head result.

1 April 2017
12:00

India	2–2	Uruguay
Pr. Rani 6'; Katariya 49'	Report	Viana 45'; Vilar del Valle 54'
Penalties
Pr. Rani (penalty shoot-out scored); Monika (penalty shoot-out scored); Deepika (penalty shoot-out scored); G. Kaur (penalty shoot-out missed); N. Kaur (penalty shoot-out scored)	4–2	(penalty shoot-out scored) Algorta; (penalty shoot-out missed) Barrandeguy; (penalty shoot-out missed) Lamberti; (penalty shoot-out missed) Kliche; (penalty shoot-out scored) Vilar del Valle

Umpires:
Lelia Sacre (CAN)
Veronica Villafañe (ARG)

2 April 2017
12:00

Belarus	0–1	India
	Report	Katariya 26'

Umpires:
Kecia Hosen (TTO)
Diana Fuentes (MEX)

4 April 2017
14:15

Uruguay	3–2	Belarus
Mutliva 14'; Kliche 24'; Dall'Orso 60'	Report	Bahushevich 15'; Syrayezhka 48'

Umpires:
Lelia Sacre (CAN)
Kecia Hosen (TTO)

==== Pool B ====
Pos	Team	Pld	W	PW	PL	L	GF	GA	GD	Pts	Qualification
1	Chile	3	3	0	0	0	12	1	+11	9	Semifinals
2	Canada (H)	3	2	0	0	1	18	1	+17	6	Quarterfinals
3	Mexico	3	1	0	0	2	6	8	−2	3	Quarterfinals
4	Trinidad and Tobago	3	0	0	0	3	1	27	−26	0	

Source: FIH
Rules for classification: 1) points; 2) goal difference; 3) goals scored; 4) head-to-head result.
(H) Host

1 April 2017
14:15

Chile	9–1	Trinidad and Tobago
Jacob 3', 11'; Caram 8'; Lagos 30', 46'; De las Heras 43'; Urroz 47', 51'; Villagran 53'	Report	Wright-Alexis 48'

Umpires:
Durga Devi (IND)
Sviatlana Karzhevich (BLR)

1 April 2017
16:30

Canada	6–0	Mexico
Thicke 4', 47'; Norlander 9'; Wright 32'; McManus 45'; Stairs 48'	Report

Umpires:
Suzi Sutton (USA)
Catalina Montesino (CHI)

2 April 2017
14:15

Mexico	6–0	Trinidad and Tobago
Navarro 4', 9'; Cota 20'; Correa 23', 24'; Estrada 51'	Report

Umpires:
Catalina Montesino (CHI)
Veronica Villafañe (ARG)

2 April 2017
16:30

Chile	1–0	Canada
Caram 26'	Report

Umpires:
Suzi Sutton (USA)
Natalia Lodeiro (URU)

4 April 2017
12:00

Mexico	0–2	Chile
	Report	Walbaum 8'; Urroz 19'

Umpires:
Durga Devi (IND)
Natalia Lodeiro (URU)

4 April 2017
16:30

Canada	12–0	Trinidad and Tobago
Donohoe 4', 18', 32'; Lee 5'; Thicke 6'; Norlander 10'; Faiczak 26', 29'; N. Woodcroft 38'; Stairs 44', 45'; Hennig 53'	Report

Umpires:
Sviatlana Karzhevich (BLR)
Diana Fuentes (MEX)

=== Second round ===
==== Bracket ====
Quarterfinals
6 April
Canada	3
Belarus	4
6 April
Uruguay	2
Mexico	1

Semifinals
8 April
India	4
Belarus	0
8 April
Chile	2
Uruguay	1

Final
9 April
India (p.s.o.)	1 (3)
Chile	1 (1)
Third place
9 April
Belarus	4
Uruguay	2

5–7th place bracket

5–7th place semifinals
8 April
Canada	8
Trinidad and Tobago	0

Fifth place
9 April
Mexico	0
Canada	4

==== Quarterfinals ====
6 April 2017
14:15

Uruguay	2–1	Mexico
Stanley 5'; Kliche 16'	Report	Navarro 47'

Umpires:
Catalina Montesino (CHI)
Sviatlana Karzhevich (BLR)

6 April 2017
16:30

Canada	3–4	Belarus
Norlander 8'; Haughn 10'; Donohoe 20'	Report	Skryba 35'; Nikitsina 40'; Mikheichyk 43'; Batura 51'

Umpires:
Suzi Sutton (USA)
Kecia Hosen (TTO)

==== Fifth to seventh place classification ====
===== Crossover =====
8 April 2017
12:00

Canada	8–0	Trinidad and Tobago
Haughn 4'; Stairs 5', 34', 48'; Johansen 13'; Hennig 15', 55'; Johnston 26'	Report

Umpires:
Diana Fuentes (MEX)
Natalia Lodeiro (URU)

===== Fifth and sixth place =====
9 April 2017
12:00

Canada	4–0	Mexico
Stairs 39', 45', 50', 60'	Report

Umpires:
Natalia Lodeiro (URU)
Durga Devi (IND)

==== First to fourth place classification ====
===== Semifinals =====
8 April 2017
14:15

India	4–0	Belarus
G. Kaur 13', 58'; Pr. Rani 20', 40'	Report

Umpires:
Veronica Villafañe (ARG)
Catalina Montesino (CHI)

8 April 2017
16:30

Chile	2–1	Uruguay
Walbaum 13'; Krimerman 56'	Report	Viana 47'

Umpires:
Lelia Sacre (CAN)
Durga Devi (IND)

===== Third and fourth place =====
9 April 2017
14:15

Belarus	4–2	Uruguay
Syrayezhka 4'; Bahushevich 20'; Batura 36', 52'	Report	Algorta 15', 42'

Umpires:
Lelia Sacre (CAN)
Catalina Montesino (CHI)

===== Final =====
9 April 2017
16:30

India	1–1	Chile
Barla 41'	Report	Maldonado 5'
Penalties
Pr. Rani (penalty shoot-out scored); Monika (penalty shoot-out scored); Deepika (penalty shoot-out scored)	3–1	(penalty shoot-out missed) Jacob; (penalty shoot-out missed) Villalabeitia; (penalty shoot-out scored) García; (penalty shoot-out missed) Yañez

Umpires:
Suzi Sutton (USA)
Veronica Villafañe (ARG)

=== Final ranking ===
Qualified for Semifinals

Rank	Team
1	India
2	Chile
3	Belarus
4	Uruguay
5	Canada
6	Mexico
7	Trinidad and Tobago
