= Women's FIH Hockey World League =

International field hockey competition

- Most recent season or competition: 2016–17 Women's FIH Hockey World League
- Sport: Women's field hockey
- Founded: 2012
- Folded: 2017
- Replaced by: Pro League (2019-present); FIH Hockey Series (2019 only); FIH Nations Cup (from 2022)
- No. of teams: 60 in 2016-17
- Last champion: Netherlands (2nd title)
- Most titles: Netherlands (2 titles)
- Website: World League Info

The Women's FIH Hockey World League was an international women's field hockey competition organised by the International Hockey Federation. The league also served as a qualifier for the 2014 and 2018 Women's Hockey World Cups and the 2016 Olympic Games. Three seasons were held in 2012–13, 2014–15 and 2016–17. It was replaced by the new Women's FIH Pro League and Hockey Series in 2018-19.

== Format ==
The tournament featured four rounds. For each edition the FIH decided the number of events and teams for each round. The number of Round 1 events varied in each cycle depending on the number of participating national teams. Teams were grouped regionally, although European teams were split in several tournaments. The remaining rounds have teams selected with no regional restrictions. The top teams received a bye to a Round 2 or Semifinal event depending on the FIH World Rankings at the time of seeking entries, number which also varied depending on the edition.

Year	Teams	Round 1	Round 2	Semifinals	Final
2012–13	45	6 events of 2 to 6 teams	4 events of 6 teams	2 events of 8 teams	1 event of 8 teams
2014–15	51	7 events of 3 to 9 teams	3 events of 8 teams	2 events of 10 teams	1 event of 8 teams
2016–17	60	7 events of 3 to 7 teams	3 events of 8 teams	2 events of 10 teams	1 event of 8 teams

== Summaries ==
Year	Final ´host	Final			3rd Place Match			Teams PR / FR
Year	Final ´host	Champions	Score	Runners-up	3rd place	Score	4th place	Teams PR / FR
2012–13	San Miguel de Tucumán, Argentina	Netherlands	5–1	Australia	England	1–1 (4–2 pen.)	Argentina	45 / 8
2014–15	Rosario, Argentina	Argentina	5–1	New Zealand	Germany	6–2	China	51 / 8
2016–17	Auckland, New Zealand	Netherlands	3–0	New Zealand	South Korea	1–0	England	53 / 8

=== Performance by nation ===
Team	Titles	Runners-up	Third place	Fourth place
Netherlands	2 (2012–13, 2016–17)			
Argentina	1 (2014–15)			1 (2012–13*)
New Zealand		2 (2014–15, 2016–17*)		
Australia		1 (2012–13)		
England			1 (2012–13)	1 (2016–17)
Germany			1 (2014–15)	
South Korea			1 (2016–17)	
China				1 (2014–15)

* = host nation

=== Team appearances ===
Team	2012–13	2014–15	2016–17	Apps at Finals
Argentina	4th	1st	5th	3
Australia	2nd	6th	9th	2
Austria	24th	28th	Round 1	–
Azerbaijan	20th	38th	Round 1	–
Barbados	Round 1	Round 1	–	–
Belarus	19th	23rd	21st	–
Belgium	11th	13th	15th	–
Brazil	29th	–	Round 1	–
Brunei	–	–	Round 1	–
Cambodia	–	–	Round 1	–
Canada	Round 1	17th	26th	–
Chile	16th	21st	17th	–
China	6th	4th	8th	3
Czech Republic	28th	Round 1	25th	–
Dominican Republic	–	33rd	-	–
England~	3rd	7th	4th	3
Fiji	30th	Round 1	Round 1	–
France	Round 1	20th	Round 1	–
Germany	7th	3rd	6th	3
Ghana	27th	34th	34th	–
Guatemala	–	Round 1	Round 1	–
Guyana	Round 1	–	–	–
Hong Kong	–	Round 1	35th	–
India	14th	10th	16th	–
Ireland	23rd	15th	13th	–
Italy	12th	16th	12th	–
Jamaica	–	Round 1	–	–
Japan	9th	12th	11th	–
Kazakhstan	26th	29th	32nd	–
Kenya	–	35th	Round 1	–
Lithuania	Round 1	31st	Round 1	–
Malaysia	17th	22nd	20th	–
Mexico	–	25th	29th	–
Myanmar	–	Round 1	–	–
Netherlands	1st	5th	1st	3
New Zealand	5th	2nd	2nd	3
Nigeria	Round 1	–	Round 1	–
Papua New Guinea	Round 1	Round 1	Round 1	–
Paraguay	–	–	Round 1	–
Peru	–	Round 1	Round 1	–
Poland	–	18th	19th	–
Puerto Rico	–	Round 1	–	–
Russia	22nd	27th	28th	–
Samoa	Round 1	Round 1	–	–
Scotland	18th	–	18th	–
Singapore	Round 1	36th	30th	–
Solomon Islands	–	–	Round 1	–
South Africa	13th	14th	10th	–
South Korea	8th	8th	3rd	3
Spain	15th	11th	14th	–
Sri Lanka	Round 1	Round 1	Round 1	–
Switzerland	–	–	Round 1	–
Tanzania	–	Round 1	–	–
Thailand	–	24th	27th	–
Tonga	–	–	Round 1	–
Trinidad and Tobago	25th	30th	33rd	–
Turkey	Round 1	37th	31st	–
Ukraine	Round 1	32nd	24th	–
United States	10th	9th	7th	1
Uruguay	21st	19th	23rd	–
Vanuatu	Round 1	Round 1	–	–
Venezuela	Round 1	–	–	–
Wales	Round 1	–	22nd	–
Total	45	51	53	

* = host nation
~ = includes results representing Great Britain
