= Women's EuroHockey Championship II =

- Most recent season or competition: 2025 Women's EuroHockey Championship II
- Formerly: Women's EuroHockey Nations Trophy
- Sport: Field hockey
- Founded: 2005; 21 years ago
- First season: 2005
- No. of teams: 8
- Confederation: EHF (Europe)
- Most recent champion: Italy (2nd title) (2025)
- Most titles: Scotland (3 titles)
- Level on pyramid: 2

The Women's EuroHockey Championship II, formerly known as the Women's EuroHockey Nations Trophy, is a competition for European national field hockey teams. It is the second level of European field hockey Championships for national teams.

The tournament has been won by seven different teams: Scotland has the most titles with three followed by Belarusand Italy with two and Azerbaijan, Belgium, France and Ireland have all won the tournament once. The most recent edition was held in Gniezno, Poland and was won by Italy.

== Results ==
Year	Host	Final			Third place match			Number of teams
Year	Host	Winner	Score	Runner-up	Third place	Score	Fourth place	Number of teams
2005; Details	Baku, Azerbaijan	Azerbaijan	1–0	Italy	Russia	3–1	Belgium	8
2007; Details	Šiauliai, Lithuania	Scotland	3–1	Russia	Belgium	4–1	Belarus	8
2009; Details	Rome, Italy	Belgium	3–2	Italy	Wales	1–0	France	8
2011; Details	Poznań, Poland	Scotland	2–0	Belarus	Russia	3–2	France	8
2013; Details	Cambrai, France	Italy	5–0	Poland	Azerbaijan	4–4 (4–3 s.o.)	France	8
2015; Details	Prague, Czech Republic	Ireland	5–0	Czech Republic	Belarus	4–2	Azerbaijan	8
2017; Details	Cardiff, Wales	Belarus	2–1	Russia	Italy	3–0	Wales	8
2019; Details	Glasgow, Scotland	Scotland	2–1	Italy	Poland	4–2	Austria	8
2021; Details	Prague, Czech Republic	Belarus	1–0	France	Poland	4–1	Wales	8
2023; Details	Prague, Czech Republic	France	2–0	Czech Republic	Wales	2–2 (3–0 s.o.)	Ukraine	8
2025; Details	Gniezno, Poland	Italy	2–1	Wales	Austria	1–1 (2–0 s.o.)	Switzerland	8

=== Summary ===
Team	Winners	Runners-up	Third place	Fourth place
Scotland	3 (2007, 2011, 2019*)			
Italy	2 (2013, 2025)	3 (2005, 2009*, 2019)	1 (2017)	
Belarus	2 (2017, 2021)	1 (2011)	1 (2015)	1 (2007)
France	1 (2023)	1 (2021)		3 (2009, 2011, 2013*)
Azerbaijan	1 (2005*)		1 (2013)	1 (2015)
Belgium	1 (2009)		1 (2007)	1 (2005)
Ireland	1 (2015)			
Russia		2 (2007, 2017)	2 (2005, 2011)	
Czech Republic		2 (2015*, 2023*)		
Wales		1 (2025)	2 (2009, 2023)	2 (2017*, 2021)
Poland		1 (2013)	2 (2019, 2021)	
Austria			1 (2025)	1 (2019)
Ukraine				1 (2023)
Switzerland				1 (2025)

* = host nation

=== Team appearances ===
Team	(Azerbaijan) 2005	(Lithuania) 2007	(Italy) 2009	(Poland) 2011	(France) 2013	(Czech Republic) 2015	(Wales) 2017	(Scotland) 2019	(Czech Republic) 2021	(Czech Republic) 2023	(Poland) 2025	Total
Austria	–	8th	–	–	5th	7th	7th	4th	7th	6th	3rd	8
Azerbaijan	1st	–	–	–	3rd	4th	–	–	–	–	–	3
Belarus	5th	4th	5th	2nd	–	3rd	1st	–	1st	–	–	7
Belgium	4th	3rd	1st	–	–	–	–	–	–	–	–	3
Croatia	–	–	–	–	–	–	–	–	–	–	8th	1
Czech Republic	–	7th	–	–	–	2nd	–	6th	6th	2nd	6th	6
France	–	5th	4th	4th	4th	6th	8th	–	2nd	1st	–	8
Ireland	–	–	–	–	–	1st	–	–	–	–	–	1
Italy	2nd	–	2nd	–	1st	–	3rd	2nd	–	–	1st	6
Lithuania	6th	6th	8th	–	8th	–	–	–	8th	7th	7th	7
Poland	8th	–	7th	6th	2nd	–	5th	3rd	3rd	5th	5th	9
Russia	3rd	2nd	–	3rd	7th	–	2nd	–	5th	–	–	6
Scotland	–	1st	–	1st	–	–	–	1st	–	–	–	3
Slovakia	–	–	–	–	–	–	–	–	–	8th	–	1
Switzerland	–	–	–	7th	–	–	–	–	–	–	4th	2
Turkey	–	–	–	–	–	–	–	8th	–	–	–	1
Ukraine	–	–	6th	5th	6th	8th	6th	7th	–	4th	WD	7
Wales	7th	–	3rd	8th	–	5th	4th	5th	4th	3rd	2nd	9
Total	8	8	8	8	8	8	8	8	8	8	8	

== See also ==
- Men's EuroHockey Championship II
- Women's EuroHockey Championship III
- Women's EuroHockey Indoor Championship II
- Women's EuroHockey Championship
