= 2009 Women's EuroHockey Nations Challenge I =

Field hockey tournament

Tournament details
- Host country: Switzerland
- City: Olten
- Dates: 9–15 August
- Teams: 5 (from 1 confederation)

Final positions
- Champions: Switzerland (1st title)
- Runner-up: Czech Republic
- Third place: Austria

Tournament statistics
- Matches played: 12
- Goals scored: 84 (7 per match)

The 2009 Women's EuroHockey Nations Challenge I was the third edition of the Women's EuroHockey Nations Challenge I, the third level of the women's European field hockey championships organized by the European Hockey Federation. It was held in Olten, Switzerland from 9 to 15 August 2009.

The hosts Switzerland won its first EuroHockey Nations Challenge I title and were promoted to the 2011 EuroHockey Championship II.

== Qualified teams ==
| Dates | Event | Location | Quotas | Qualifier(s) |
|---|---|---|---|---|
| 2–9 September 2007 | 2007 EuroHockey Nations Trophy | Šiauliai, Lithuania | 2 | Austria; Czech Republic |
| 2–8 September 2007 | 2007 EuroHockey Nations Challenge I | Zagreb, Croatia | 2 | ~~Croatia~~; ~~Serbia~~; Slovakia; Switzerland; ~~Turkey~~ |
| New entry | | | 1 | Georgia |
| Total | | | 5 | |

== Results ==
=== Preliminary round ===
| Pos | Team | Pld | W | D | L | GF | GA | GD | Pts | Qualification |
|---|---|---|---|---|---|---|---|---|---|---|
| 1 | Switzerland (H) | 4 | 4 | 0 | 0 | 26 | 2 | +24 | 12 | Final |
| 2 | Czech Republic | 4 | 3 | 0 | 1 | 26 | 3 | +23 | 9 | Final |
| 3 | Austria | 4 | 2 | 0 | 2 | 16 | 10 | +6 | 6 | Third place game |
| 4 | Slovakia | 4 | 1 | 0 | 3 | 10 | 18 | −8 | 3 | Third place game |
| 5 | Georgia | 4 | 0 | 0 | 4 | 2 | 47 | −45 | 0 | |

Source: TheSports.org
(H) Hosts

9 August 2009
13:00

| Switzerland | 17–0 | Georgia |

9 August 2009
15:00

| Austria | 5–2 | Slovakia |

10 August 2009
16:00

| Czech Republic | 13–0 | Georgia |

10 August 2009
18:00

| Slovakia | 0–3 | Switzerland |

11 August 2009
14:00

| Austria | 1–4 | Czech Republic |

11 August 2009
16:00

| Georgia | 2–8 | Slovakia |

12 August 2009
16:00

| Slovakia | 0–8 | Czech Republic |

12 August 2009
18:00

| Switzerland | 4–1 | Austria |

14 August 2009
16:00

| Georgia | 0–9 | Austria |

14 August 2009
18:00

| Czech Republic | 1–2 | Switzerland |

=== Classification round ===
==== Third place game ====
15 August 2009
12:30

| Austria | 2–0 | Slovakia |

==== Final ====
15 August 2009
15:00

| Switzerland | 2–0 | Czech Republic |

== Final standings ==
| Pos | Team | Promotion |
|---|---|---|
| 1 | Switzerland (H, P) | EuroHockey Championship II |
| 2 | Czech Republic | |
| 3 | Austria | |
| 4 | Slovakia | |
| 5 | Georgia | |

Source: Todor66
(H) Host; (P) Promoted

== See also ==
- 2009 Men's EuroHockey Nations Challenge I
- 2009 Women's EuroHockey Nations Trophy
