= 2011 Women's EuroHockey Championship II =

Field hockey tournament

Tournament details
- Host country: Poland
- City: Poznań
- Dates: 6–14 August
- Teams: 8 (from 1 confederation)

Final positions
- Champions: Scotland (2nd title)
- Runner-up: Belarus
- Third place: Russia

Tournament statistics
- Matches played: 20
- Goals scored: 96 (4.8 per match)

The 2011 Women's EuroHockey Championship II was the 4th edition of the Women's EuroHockey Championship II and the first edition with the new name. It was held from 6 to 14 August 2011 in Poznań, Poland. The tournament also served as a qualifier for the 2013 EuroHockey Championship, with the finalists Scotland and Belarus qualifying.

== Qualified teams ==
Dates	Event	Location	Quotas	Qualifier(s)
22 - 30 August 2009	2009 EuroHockey Championship	Amsterdam, Netherlands	2	Russia; Scotland
19 - 25 July 2009	2009 EuroHockey Nations Trophy	Rome, Italy	5	Wales; France; Belarus; Ukraine; Poland
9 - 15 August 2009	2009 EuroHockey Challenge I	Olten, Switzerland	1	Switzerland
Total			8	

== Format ==
The eight teams were split into two groups of four teams. The top two teams advanced to the semifinals to determine the winner in a knockout system. The bottom two teams played in a new group with the teams they did not play against in the group stage. The last two teams were relegated to the EuroHockey Championship III.

== Results ==
All times were local (UTC+2).

=== Preliminary round ===
==== Pool A ====
Pos	Team	Pld	W	D	L	GF	GA	GD	Pts	Qualification
1	Russia	3	2	1	0	8	5	+3	7	Semifinals
2	France	3	1	2	0	8	5	+3	5	Semifinals
3	Ukraine	3	1	1	1	15	8	+7	4	Pool C
4	Switzerland	3	0	0	3	5	18	−13	0	Pool C

Source: https://www.the-sports.org/field-hockey-2013-women-s-eurohockey-nations-championships-ii-epr55001.html
Rules for classification: 1) points; 2) goal difference; 3) goals scored; 4) head-to-head result.

8 August 2011

Russia	1–1	France

8 August 2011

Ukraine	10–2	Switzerland

9 August 2011

Ukraine	3–4	Russia

9 August 2011

France	5–2	Switzerland

11 August 2011

France	2–2	Ukraine

11 August 2011

Russia	3–1	Switzerland

==== Pool B ====
Pos	Team	Pld	W	D	L	GF	GA	GD	Pts	Qualification
1	Belarus	3	3	0	0	11	6	+5	9	Semifinals
2	Scotland	3	2	0	1	4	3	+1	6	Semifinals
3	Wales	3	0	1	2	3	5	−2	1	Pool C
4	Poland	3	0	1	2	5	9	−4	1	Pool C

Source: https://www.the-sports.org/field-hockey-2013-women-s-eurohockey-nations-championships-ii-epr55001.html
Rules for classification: 1) points; 2) goal difference; 3) goals scored; 4) head-to-head result.

8 August 2011

Scotland	1–0	Wales

8 August 2011

Belarus	6–3	Poland

10 August 2011

Wales	1–1	Poland

10 August 2011

Belarus	2–1	Scotland

11 August 2011

Scotland	2–1	Poland

11 August 2011

Belarus	3–2	Wales

=== Fifth to eighth place classification ===
==== Pool C ====
The points obtained in the preliminary round against the other team are taken over.

Pos	Team	Pld	W	D	L	GF	GA	GD	Pts	Relegation
1	Ukraine	3	1	1	1	6	3	+3	4	
2	Poland	3	2	0	1	6	7	−1	6	
3	Switzerland	3	1	1	1	6	6	0	4	Relegated to EuroHockey Championship III
4	Wales	3	0	2	1	4	6	−2	2	Relegated to EuroHockey Championship III

Source: https://www.the-sports.org/field-hockey-2013-women-s-eurohockey-nations-championships-ii-epr55001.html
Rules for classification: 1) points; 2) goal difference; 3) goals scored; 4) head-to-head result.

13 August 2011

Switzerland	1–4	Poland

13 August 2011

Ukraine	7–3	Wales

14 August 2011

Switzerland	2–1	Wales

14 August 2011

Ukraine	2–2	Poland

=== First to fourth place classification ===
Semi-finals
France	0
Belarus	5
Russia	1
Scotland	2

Final
Belarus	0
Scotland	2
Third place
France	2
Russia	3

==== Semifinals ====
13 August 2011

France	0–5	Belarus

13 August 2011

Russia	1–2	Scotland

==== Third and fourth place ====
14 August 2011

France	2–3	Russia

==== Final ====
14 August 2011

Belarus	0–2	Scotland

== Final standings ==
Rank	Team
Gold medal	Scotland
Silver medal	Belarus
Bronze medal	Russia
4	France
5	Ukraine
6	Poland
7	Switzerland
8	Wales

== See also ==
- 2011 Men's EuroHockey Championship II
- 2011 Women's EuroHockey Nations Championship
