= 2018–19 Women's Hockey Series =

Field hockey tournament

Tournament details
- Teams: 42 (from 5 confederations)
- Venue: 10 (in 10 host cities)

Final positions
- Champions: South Korea; India; Spain

Tournament statistics
- Matches played: 130
- Goals scored: 801 (6.16 per match)

The 2018–19 Women's Hockey Series was the inaugural season of the Hockey Series, a field hockey championship for women's national teams. The tournament started in June 2018 and finished in June 2019.

== Format ==
The Hockey Series was open to national teams that were not playing in the Pro League.

The Hockey Series took place in two rounds, the Open and the Finals. The nine highest-ranked teams in the FIH World Rankings (as of 9 June 2017) skipped the Open and advanced directly to the Finals. All other national teams played in the Hockey Series Open, which features six regional events with up to six teams each. Fifteen teams qualified from the Hockey Series Open to the Hockey Series Finals, for a total of 24 teams in the Finals. Those teams played in three events, with eight teams per event (three automatic qualifiers and five that advanced from the Open).

The top two placed teams in each of the Finals events qualified for the 2019 FIH Olympic Qualifiers. In this qualification event, they were joined by the top four placed teams from the Pro League, and the two highest ranked teams not already qualified. The teams were drawn and played a two-legged tie to determine six qualified nations for the Olympic Games.

== Schedule ==
=== Open events ===
Dates	Location	Teams	Hockey series finals quotas	Hockey series finals qualifier(s)
5–10 June 2018	Salamanca, Mexico	Canada; Guatemala; Mexico; Panama; Puerto Rico	2	Canada; Mexico
23 June – 1 July 2018	Singapore	Hong Kong; Indonesia; Kazakhstan; Malaysia; Singapore; Thailand	2	Malaysia; Thailand
6–8 July 2018	Wattignies, France	Austria; Belarus; France; Russia	3	Belarus; France; Russia
13–18 August 2018	Port Vila, Vanuatu	Fiji; Solomon Islands; Tonga; Vanuatu	1	Fiji
21–26 August 2018	Vilnius, Lithuania	Czech Republic; Lithuania; Turkey; Ukraine; Wales	3	Czech Republic; Ukraine; Wales
18–23 September 2018	Santiago, Chile	Bolivia; Brazil; Chile; Paraguay; Peru; Uruguay	2	Chile; Uruguay
7–9 December 2018	Bulawayo, Zimbabwe	Namibia; Zambia; Zimbabwe	1	Namibia
			1	Singapore
Total			15	

=== Finals events ===
The pools and venues were announced on 23 October 2018 with one team from Africa still to qualify.

Dates	Location	Teams qualified		Olympic qualification events quotas	Olympic qualification event qualifiers
Dates	Location	By ranking	From Hockey Series Open	Olympic qualification events quotas	Olympic qualification event qualifiers
8–16 June 2019	Banbridge, Ireland	Ireland; South Korea; Scotland	Czech Republic; France; Malaysia; Singapore; Ukraine	2	Ireland; South Korea
15–23 June 2019	Hiroshima, Japan	India; Japan (Note: Japan cannot qualify for the Olympic Qualifiers because they have already qualified as hosts and winners of the Asian Games.); Poland	Chile; Fiji; Mexico; Russia; Uruguay	1 (Note: Because Japan finished in the top two and cannot qualify for the Olympic Qualifiers only one team qualified.)	India
19–27 June 2019	Valencia, Spain	Italy; Spain; South Africa	Belarus; Canada; Namibia; Thailand; Wales	2	Canada; Spain
Total				5	
