= Poland national field hockey team =

Poland national field hockey team may refer to:

- Poland men's national field hockey team
- Poland women's national field hockey team
