= 2007 Women's EuroHockey Nations Trophy =

European hockey championship in Lithuania

Tournament details
- Host country: Lithuania
- City: Šiauliai
- Dates: 2–9 September
- Teams: 8 (from 1 confederation)

Final positions
- Champions: Scotland (1st title)
- Runner-up: Russia
- Third place: Belgium

Tournament statistics
- Matches played: 20
- Goals scored: 89 (4.45 per match)

The 2007 Women's EuroHockey Nations Trophy was the second edition of the Women's EuroHockey Nations Trophy, the second level of the women's European field hockey championships organized by the European Hockey Federation. It was held from 2 to 9 September 2007 in Šiauliai, Lithuania.

Scotland won its first EuroHockey Nations Trophy title and were promoted to the 2009 EuroHockey Championship together with the runners-up Russia.

== Qualified teams ==
Dates	Event	Location	Quotas	Qualifiers
14–20 August 2005	2005 EuroHockey Championship	Dublin, Ireland	2	France; Scotland
5–11 September 2005	2005 EuroHockey Nations Trophy	Baku, Azerbaijan	4	Belarus; Belgium; Lithuania; Russia
11–17 September 2005	2005 EuroHockey Challenge I	Prague, Czech Republic	2	Austria; Czech Republic
Total			8	

== Results ==
=== Preliminary round ===
==== Pool A ====
Pos	Team	Pld	W	D	L	GF	GA	GD	Pts	Qualification
1	Belarus	3	2	0	1	14	4	+10	6	Semi-finals
2	Belgium	3	2	0	1	13	6	+7	6	Semi-finals
3	France	3	2	0	1	9	5	+4	6	Relegation pool
4	Austria	3	0	0	3	2	23	−21	0	Relegation pool

Source: TheSports.org

2 September 2007
11:00

France	5–1	Austria

2 September 2007
13:00

Belgium	1–4	Belarus

3 September 2007
15:00

France	2–1	Belarus

3 September 2007
17:00

Belgium	9–0	Austria

5 September 2007
11:00

France	2–3	Belgium

5 September 2007
13:00

Belarus	9–1	Austria

==== Pool B ====
Pos	Team	Pld	W	D	L	GF	GA	GD	Pts	Qualification
1	Scotland	3	3	0	0	10	5	+5	9	Semi-finals
2	Russia	3	1	1	1	6	4	+2	4	Semi-finals
3	Lithuania (H)	3	1	1	1	5	5	0	4	Relegation pool
4	Czech Republic	3	0	0	3	5	12	−7	0	Relegation pool

Source: TheSports.org
(H) Hosts

2 September 2007
15:00

Scotland	4–2	Czech Republic

2 September 2007
17:00

Russia	0–0	Lithuania

4 September 2007
15:00

Russia	5–1	Czech Republic

4 September 2007
17:00

Scotland	3–2	Lithuania

5 September 2007
15:00

Scotland	3–1	Russia

5 September 2007
17:00

Lithuania	3–2	Czech Republic

=== Fifth to eighth place classification ===
==== Pool C ====
The points obtained in the preliminary round against the other team are taken over.

Pos	Team	Pld	W	D	L	GF	GA	GD	Pts	Relegation
5	France	3	3	0	0	8	2	+6	9	
6	Lithuania (H)	3	2	0	1	6	3	+3	6	
7	Czech Republic	3	1	0	2	7	5	+2	3	EuroHockey Nations Challenge I
8	Austria	3	0	0	3	1	12	−11	0	EuroHockey Nations Challenge I

Source: TheSports.org
(H) Hosts

7 September 2007
11:00

Austria	0–3	Lithuania

7 September 2007
13:00

France	2–1	Czech Republic

8 September 2007
15:00

Austria	0–4	Czech Republic

8 September 2007
17:00

France	1–0	Lithuania

=== First to fourth place classification ===
Semi-finals
7 September
Scotland	2
Belgium	0
7 September
Belarus	1
Russia	2

Final
9 September
Scotland	3
Russia	1
Third place
9 September
Belgium	4
Belarus	1

==== Semi-finals ====
7 September 2007
15:00

Scotland	2–0	Belgium

7 September 2007
17:30

Belarus	1–2	Russia

==== Third place game ====
9 September 2007
12:00

Belgium	4–1	Belarus

==== Final ====
9 September 2007
14:30

Scotland	3–1	Russia

== Final standings ==
Pos	Team	Qualification or relegation
1	Scotland	Qualification for the 2009 EuroHockey Championship
2	Russia	Qualification for the 2009 EuroHockey Championship
3	Belgium	
4	Belarus	
5	France	
6	Lithuania (H)	
7	Czech Republic	Relegation to the EuroHockey Nations Challenge I
8	Austria	Relegation to the EuroHockey Nations Challenge I

Source: Todor66
(H) Host

== See also ==
- 2009 Men's EuroHockey Nations Trophy
- 2009 Women's EuroHockey Nations Championship
