= 2014–15 Women's FIH Hockey World League =

International field hockey competition

Tournament details
- Teams: 51
- Venue(s): 13 (in 13 host cities)

Final positions
- Champions: Argentina (1st title)
- Runner-up: New Zealand
- Third place: Germany

Tournament statistics
- Matches played: 212
- Goals scored: 1036 (4.89 per match)

The 2014–15 Women's FIH Hockey World League was the second edition of women's field hockey national team league series. The tournament started in June 2014 in Singapore, and finished in December 2015 in Rosario, Argentina.

The Semifinals of this competition also served as a qualifier for the 2016 Summer Olympics as 7 highest placed teams apart from the five continental champions qualified.

Argentina won the tournament's Final round for the first time after defeating New Zealand 5–1 in the final. Germany won the third place match by defeating China 6–2.

== Qualification ==
Each national association member of the International Hockey Federation (FIH) had the opportunity to compete in the tournament, and after seeking entries to participate, 51 teams were announced to compete.

The 11 teams ranked between 1st and 11th in the FIH World Rankings current at early 2013 received an automatic bye to the Semifinals while the 8 teams ranked between 12th and 19th received an automatic bye to Round 2. Scotland would have qualified as the nineteenth ranked team but will compete as Great Britain as in every Olympic Qualifying Tournament, giving its berth to twentieth ranked Russia. Those nineteen teams, shown with qualifying rankings, were the following:

- Netherlands (1)
- Argentina (2)
- New Zealand (3)
- Great Britain (4)
- Germany (5)
- Australia (6)
- China (7)
- South Korea (8)
- Japan (9)
- United States (10)
- South Africa (11)
- India (12)
- Belgium (13)
- Ireland (14)
- Spain (15)
- Azerbaijan (16)
- Italy (17)
- Chile (18)
- Russia (20)

== Schedule ==
=== Round 1 ===
Dates	Location	Teams	Round 2 Quotas	Round 2 Qualifier(s)
21–26 June 2014	Singapore	Hong Kong; Kazakhstan; Malaysia; Myanmar; Singapore; Sri Lanka; Thailand	4	Malaysia; Kazakhstan; Thailand; Singapore
27–29 June 2014	Šiauliai, Lithuania	Belarus; Lithuania; Poland; Ukraine	3	Belarus; Ukraine; Lithuania
5–7 September 2014	Hradec Králové, Czech Republic	Austria; Czech Republic; France; Turkey	3	France; Austria; Czech Republic
5–7 September 2014	Nairobi, Kenya	Ghana; Kenya; Tanzania	1	Kenya
11–14 September 2014	Guadalajara, Mexico	Canada; Guatemala; Mexico; Peru	2	Canada; Mexico
30 September–5 October 2014	Kingston, Jamaica	Barbados; Dominican Republic; Jamaica; Puerto Rico; Trinidad and Tobago	2	Trinidad and Tobago; Dominican Republic
6–11 December 2014	Suva, Fiji	Fiji; Papua New Guinea; Samoa; Vanuatu	1	Fiji

=== Round 2 ===
Dates	Location	Teams Qualified			Semifinals Quotas	Semifinals Qualifiers
Dates	Location	Host	By Ranking	From Round 1	Semifinals Quotas	Semifinals Qualifiers
14-22 February 2015	Montevideo, Uruguay	Uruguay	Azerbaijan; Italy	Dominican Republic; France; Kenya; Mexico; Trinidad and Tobago	3	Italy; Uruguay; Azerbaijan
7–15 March 2015	New Delhi, India	India	Russia	Ghana; Kazakhstan; Malaysia; Poland; Singapore; Thailand	2	India; Poland
14–22 March 2015	Dublin, Ireland	Ireland	Chile	Austria; Belarus; Canada; Lithuania; Turkey^{1} Ukraine	2	Ireland; Canada

^1 – The Czech Republic withdrew from participating and Turkey took their place.

=== Semifinals ===
Dates	Location	Teams Qualified			Final Quotas	Final Qualifiers
Dates	Location	Host	By Ranking	From Round 2	Final Quotas	Final Qualifiers
10–21 June 2015	Valencia, Spain	Spain	Argentina; China; Germany; Great Britain; South Africa; United States	Canada; Ireland; Uruguay	4	Great Britain; China; Germany; Argentina
20 June–5 July 2015	Antwerp, Belgium	Belgium	Australia; Japan; Netherlands; New Zealand; South Korea	France^{2} India; Italy; Poland	4	Australia; Netherlands; New Zealand; South Korea

^2 – Azerbaijan withdrew from participating and France took their place.

=== Final ===
Dates	Location	Teams Qualified	
Dates	Location	Host	From Semifinals
5–13 December 2015	Rosario, Argentina	Argentina	Australia; China; Germany; Great Britain; Netherlands; New Zealand; South Korea

== Final ranking ==
1. Argentina
2. New Zealand
3. Germany
4. China
5. Netherlands
6. Australia
7. Great Britain
8. South Korea
9. United States
10. India
11. Spain
12. Japan
13. Belgium
14. South Africa
15. Ireland
16. Italy
17. Canada
18. Poland
19. Uruguay
20. France
21. Chile
22. Malaysia
23. Belarus
24. Thailand
25. Mexico
26. Not specified
27. Russia
28. Austria
29. Kazakhstan
30. Trinidad and Tobago
31. Lithuania
32. Ukraine
33. Dominican Republic
34. Ghana
35. Kenya
36. Singapore
37. Turkey
38. Azerbaijan
