= Austria national field hockey team =

Austria national field hockey team may refer to:

- Austria men's national field hockey team
- Austria women's national field hockey team
