= Women's EuroHockey Championship =

International women's field hockey competition

- Current season, competition or edition: 2025 Women's EuroHockey Championship
- Sport: Field hockey
- Founded: 1984; 42 years ago
- First season: 1984
- No. of teams: 8
- Continent: EHF (Europe)
- Most recent champion: Netherlands (13th title) (2025)
- Most titles: Netherlands (13 titles)
- Level on pyramid: 1
- Relegation to: EuroHockey Championship II

The Women's EuroHockey Championship is an international women's field hockey competition organized by the European Hockey Federation (EHF) for the top eight European national teams. It is the top division of the EuroHockey Championships. The inaugural tournament took place in 1984. When the tournament is held close to the Summer Olympic games or the Women's Hockey World Cup, the winner of the tournament is awarded a place in those competitions.

== Format ==
The tournament is played in Divisions normally consisting of eight teams. The top division, containing the eight best national teams, is called the EuroHockey Nations Championship, below which there is the EuroHockey Championship II, then the EuroHockey Championship III, then the EuroHockey Championship IV, and so on.

=== Qualification ===
National teams qualify for a division based on their performance in the previous competition. Each time the competition is held, it is with each division's previous top two teams promoted (assuming there is a higher division), and its previous bottom two teams demoted (assuming there is a lower division).

1. 1984-2003 + 2023: Qualification Tournament
2. 2005-Ongoing: Via Women's EuroHockey Championship II and Women's EuroHockey Championship III

=== Summary ===
Assuming divisions consisting of the standard 8 teams, the teams are separated into two pools of four teams. In each pool (pool A and B) the teams play one match against each of the other teams in their pool (three in total). The teams then go on to play classification matches based on their relative ranking from these pool matches to determine their final tournament position.

=== Details ===
In each pool, A and B, all the teams play each other once, with points awarded as follows:

- 3 points for a win
- 1 point for a draw
- 0 points for a loss

Upon completion of these matches, each team in the pool is ranked according to the number of points each has accumulated. If any teams in the pool have the same rank, then these teams are ranked:

- According to the number of matches they won, or else, if equal
- According to respective goal difference ('goals for' less 'goals against'), or else
- According to 'goals for', or else
- If only two teams are involved, according to the result of the match played between those teams, or else
- According to the results of a penalty stroke competition between those teams, or else
- This procedure is repeated using the penalty stroke result until the teams can be ranked

Once the relative ranking of the teams in pools A and B is settled, the semi-finals proceed with two games as follows:

- Second Pool A v First Pool B
- First Pool A v Second Pool B

The winners of these matches then play a match against each other for 1st and 2nd places (the final) and the losing teams play a match against each other for 3rd and 4th places (Bronze medal match).

The third and fourth placed teams in each pool are placed in Pool C (the Relegation Pool) in order to determine fifth to eighth places. Each team plays one match against the two teams that they did not previously play. The results from those games and from the game that was previously played against the other team in their original pool are used to rank each team according to the ranking procedure used in Pool A and B.

== Results ==
#	Year	Host	Final			Third place match			Teams
#	Year	Host	Winner	Score	Runner-up	Third place	Score	Fourth place	Teams
1	1984; Details	Lille, France	Netherlands	2–0	Soviet Union	West Germany	1–0	England	12
2	1987; Details	London, England	Netherlands	2–2 (a.e.t.) (3–1 p.s.)	England	Soviet Union	2–1	West Germany	12
3	1991; Details	Brussels, Belgium	England	2–1	Germany	Soviet Union	3–2	Netherlands	12
4	1995; Details	Amsterdam, Netherlands	Netherlands	2–2 (a.e.t.) (4–1 p.s.)	Spain	Germany	1–0	England	12
5	1999; Details	Cologne, Germany	Netherlands	2–1	Germany	England	5–0	Russia	12
6	2003; Details	Barcelona, Spain	Netherlands	5–0	Spain	Germany	3–1	England	12
7	2005; Details	Dublin, Ireland	Netherlands	2–1	Germany	England	4–0	Spain	8
8	2007; Details	Manchester, England	Germany	2–0	Netherlands	England	3–2	Spain	8
9	2009; Details	Amstelveen, Netherlands	Netherlands	3–2	Germany	England	2–1	Spain	8
10	2011; Details	Mönchengladbach, Germany	Netherlands	3–0	Germany	England	2–1	Spain	8
11	2013; Details	Boom, Belgium	Germany	4–4 (2–0 p.s.o.)	England	Netherlands	3–1	Belgium	8
12	2015; Details	London, England	England	2–2 (3–1 p.s.o.)	Netherlands	Germany	5–1	Spain	8
13	2017; Details	Amstelveen, Netherlands	Netherlands	3–0	Belgium	England	2–0	Germany	8
14	2019; Details	Antwerp, Belgium	Netherlands	2–0	Germany	Spain	1–1 (3–2 p.s.o.)	England	8
15	2021; Details	Amstelveen, Netherlands	Netherlands	2–0	Germany	Belgium	3–1	Spain	8
16	2023; Details	Mönchengladbach, Germany	Netherlands	3–1	Belgium	Germany	3–0	England	8
17	2025; Details	Mönchengladbach, Germany	Netherlands	2–1	Germany	Spain	0–0 (2–1 p.s.o.)	Belgium	8
18	2027; Details	London, England							12

== Top four statistics ==
Team	Champions	Runners-up	Third-place	Fourth-place
Netherlands	13 (1984, 1987, 1995*, 1999, 2003, 2005, 2009*, 2011, 2017*, 2019, 2021*, 2023, 2025)	2 (2007, 2015)	1 (2013)	1 (1991)
Germany (Note: Includes results representing West Germany between 1970 and 1990)	2 (2007, 2013)	8 (1991, 1999*, 2005, 2009, 2011*, 2019, 2021, 2025*)	5 (1984, 1995, 2003, 2015, 2023*)	2 (1987, 2017)
England	2 (1991, 2015*)	2 (1987*, 2013)	6 (1999, 2005, 2007*, 2009, 2011, 2017)	5 (1984, 1995, 2003, 2019, 2023)
Spain		2 (1995, 2003*)	2 (2019, 2025)	6 (2005, 2007, 2009, 2011, 2015, 2021)
Belgium		2 (2017, 2023)	1 (2021)	2 (2013*, 2025)
Soviet Union		1 (1984)	2 (1987, 1991)	
Russia				1 (1999)

* = host

== Team appearances ==
Team	(France) 1984	(England) 1987	(Belgium) 1991	(Netherlands) 1995	(Germany) 1999	(Spain) 2003	(Ireland) 2005	(England) 2007	(Netherlands) 2009	(Germany) 2011	(Belgium) 2013	(England) 2015	(Netherlands) 2017	(Belgium) 2019	(Netherlands) 2021	(Germany) 2023	(Germany) 2025	(England) 2027	Total
Austria	11th	12th	12th	–	–	–	–	–	–	–	–	–	–	–	–	–	–	Q	3
Azerbaijan	Part of the Soviet Union			–	–	9th	–	5th	6th	7th	–	–	–	–	–	–	–		4
Belarus	Part of the Soviet Union			–	–	–	–	–	–	–	8th	–	–	8th	–	–	–		2
Belgium	8th	9th	7th	11th	11th	–	–	–	–	5th	4th	5th	2nd	6th	3rd	2nd	4th	Q	14
Czech Republic	Part of Czechoslovakia			10th	12th	–	–	–	–	–	–	–	7th	–	–	–	–		3
Czechoslovakia	9th	–	–	Defunct															1
England	4th	2nd	1st	4th	3rd	4th	3rd	3rd	3rd	3rd	2nd	1st	3rd	4th	5th	4th	5th	Q	18
France	10th	10th	10th	7th	10th	8th	8th	–	–	–	–	–	–	–	–	–	6th	Q	9
Germany	3rd	4th	2nd	3rd	2nd	3rd	2nd	1st	2nd	2nd	1st	3rd	4th	2nd	2nd	3rd	2nd	Q	18
Ireland	5th	7th	8th	8th	9th	6th	5th	6th	5th	6th	7th	–	6th	5th	6th	5th	8th	Q	17
Italy	12th	11th	11th	9th	–	11th	–	7th	–	8th	–	7th	–	–	8th	8th	–	Q	11
Lithuania	–	–	–	–	8th	–	–	–	–	–	–	–	–	–	–	–	–		1
Netherlands	1st	1st	4th	1st	1st	1st	1st	2nd	1st	1st	3rd	2nd	1st	1st	1st	1st	1st	Q	18
Poland	–	–	–	–	–	–	–	–	–	–	–	8th	–	–	–	–	–		1
Russia	Part of the Soviet Union			5th	4th	10th	–	–	7th	–	–	–	–	7th	–	–	–		5
Scotland	6th	6th	5th	6th	6th	7th	7th	–	8th	–	6th	6th	8th	–	7th	7th	5th	Q	15
Soviet Union	2nd	3rd	3rd	Defunct															3
Spain	7th	5th	6th	2nd	5th	2nd	4th	4th	4th	4th	5th	4th	5th	3rd	4th	6th	3rd	Q	18
Sweden	–	–	–	12th	–	–	–	–	–	–	–	–	–	–	–	–	–		1
Ukraine	Part of the Soviet Union			–	7th	5th	6th	8th	–	–	–	–	–	–	–	–	–	Q	4
Wales	–	8th	9th	–	–	12th	–	–	–	–	–	–	–	–	–	–	–	Q	4
Total	12	12	12	12	12	12	8	8	8	8	8	8	8	8	8	8	8	12	

== See also ==
- Men's EuroHockey Championship
- Women's EuroHockey Championship II
- Women's EuroHockey Indoor Championship
- Women's EuroHockey U21 Championship
