= Valentina Braconi =

Italian-Argentine field hockey player (born 1990)

Personal information
- Born: 4 August 1990 (age 35) Argentina

Sport
- Sport: Field hockey
- Position: Forward
- Club: Club La Tablada
National team
Years	Team	Caps	Goals
–	Italy	76	-

Valentina Braconi (born 4 August 1990) is an Italian-Argentine field hockey player for the Italian national team.

She participated at the 2018 Women's Hockey World Cup.

== Personal life ==
She was born in Argentina.
