= 2007 Women's EuroHockey Nations Challenge I =

Field hockey tournament

Tournament details
- Host country: Croatia
- City: Zagreb
- Dates: 2–8 September
- Teams: 7 (from 1 confederation)

Final positions
- Champions: Wales (1st title)
- Runner-up: Poland
- Third place: Switzerland

Tournament statistics
- Matches played: 15
- Goals scored: 94 (6.27 per match)

The 2007 Women's EuroHockey Nations Challenge I was the second edition of the Women's EuroHockey Nations Challenge I, the third level of the women's European field hockey championships organized by the European Hockey Federation. It was held in Zagreb, Croatia from 2 to 8 September 2007.

Wales won its first EuroHockey Nations Challenge I title and were promoted to the 2011 EuroHockey Nations Trophy together with the runners-up Poland. Switzerland defeated Slovakia to clinch the third place.

== Qualified teams ==
Dates	Event	Location	Quotas	Qualifiers
5–11 September 2005	2005 EuroHockey Nations Trophy	Baku, Azerbaijan	2	Poland; Wales
11–17 September 2005	2005 EuroHockey Challenge I	Prague, Czech Republic	5	~~Bulgaria~~; Croatia; Serbia; Slovakia; Switzerland; Turkey
Total			7	

== Preliminary round ==
=== Pool A ===
Pos	Team	Pld	W	D	L	GF	GA	GD	Pts	Qualification
1	Wales	2	2	0	0	8	3	+5	6	Semi-finals
2	Switzerland	2	1	0	1	9	6	+3	3	Semi-finals
3	Croatia (H)	2	0	0	2	1	9	−8	0	

Source: TheSports.org
(H) Hosts

2 September 2007
17:30

Wales	5–3	Switzerland

3 September 2007
18:30

Switzerland	6–1	Croatia

5 September 2007
18:30

Wales	3–0	Croatia

=== Pool B ===
Pos	Team	Pld	W	D	L	GF	GA	GD	Pts	Qualification
1	Poland	3	3	0	0	27	2	+25	9	Semi-finals
2	Slovakia	3	2	0	1	18	4	+14	6	Semi-finals
3	Serbia	3	0	1	2	1	19	−18	1	
4	Turkey	3	0	1	2	2	23	−21	1	

Source: TheSports.org

2 September 2007
13:30

Poland	14–0	Turkey

2 September 2007
15:30

Slovakia	8–0	Serbia

3 September 2007
14:30

Poland	10–0	Serbia

3 September 2007
16:30

Slovakia	8–1	Turkey

5 September 2007
14:30

Serbia	1–1	Turkey

5 September 2007
16:30

Poland	3–2	Slovakia

== Classification round ==
=== Fifth to seventh place classification ===
The points obtained in the preliminary round against the other team are taken over.

Pos	Team	Pld	W	D	L	GF	GA	GD	Pts
5	Croatia (H)	2	2	0	0	9	0	+9	6
7	Turkey	2	0	1	1	1	3	−2	1
6	Serbia	2	0	1	1	1	8	−7	1

Source: TheSports.org
(H) Hosts

7 September 2007

Croatia	2–0	Turkey

8 September 2007

Croatia	7–0	Serbia

=== First to fourth place classification ===
Semi-finals
7 September
Wales	4
Slovakia	1
7 September
Poland	5
Switzerland	4

Final
8 September
Wales (p.s.)	2 (2)
Poland	2 (0)
Third place
8 September
Switzerland	1
Slovakia	0

==== Semi-finals ====
7 September 2007
16:30

Poland	5–4	Switzerland

7 September 2007
18:30

Wales	4–1	Slovakia

==== Third place game ====
8 September 2007
15:00

Switzerland	1–0	Slovakia

==== Final ====
8 September 2007
17:30

Wales	2–2 (a.e.t.)	Poland
Penalties
	2–0

== Final standings ==
Pos	Team	Promotion
1	Wales	EuroHockey Nations Trophy
2	Poland	EuroHockey Nations Trophy
3	Switzerland	
4	Slovakia	
5	Croatia (H)	
6	Turkey	
7	Serbia	

Source: Todor66
(H) Host

== See also ==
- 2007 Men's EuroHockey Nations Challenge I
- 2007 Women's EuroHockey Nations Trophy
