= 2016–17 Women's FIH Hockey World League =

International field hockey competition

Tournament details
- Teams: 60
- Venue(s): 13 (in 13 host cities)

Final positions
- Champions: Netherlands (2nd title)
- Runner-up: New Zealand
- Third place: South Korea

The 2016–17 Women's FIH Hockey World League was the third edition of the women's field hockey national team league series and last season of the World League. The tournament started in April 2016 in Singapore and finished in November 2017 in Auckland, New Zealand.

The Semifinals of this competition also served as a qualifier for the 2018 Women's Hockey World Cup as the 10/11 highest placed teams apart from the host nation and the five continental champions qualify.

The Netherlands won the tournament's Final round for a record second time after defeating host nation New Zealand 3–0 in the final match. South Korea won the third place match by defeating England 1–0.

From 2019 onwards, the tournament was replaced by Pro League.

== Qualification ==
Each national association member of the International Hockey Federation (FIH) had the opportunity to compete in the tournament, and after seeking entries to participate, several teams were announced to compete.

The eleven teams ranked between 1st and 11th in the FIH World Rankings current at early 2015 received an automatic bye to the Semifinals while the nine teams ranked between 12th and 20th received an automatic bye to Round 2. Those twenty teams, shown with qualifying rankings, were the following:

- Netherlands (1)
- Australia (2)
- Argentina (3)
- New Zealand (4)
- United States (5)
- Germany (6)
- China (7)
- England (8)
- South Korea(9)
- Japan (10)
- South Africa (11)
- Belgium (12)
- India (13)
- Ireland (14)
- Spain (15)
- Italy (16)
- Scotland (17)
- Belarus (18)
- Azerbaijan (19)
- Canada (20)

== Schedule ==
=== Round 1 ===
Dates	Location	Teams	Round 2 Quotas	Round 2 Qualifier(s)
9–17 April 2016	Singapore	Brunei; Cambodia; Hong Kong; Kazakhstan; Singapore; Sri Lanka; Thailand	3	Thailand; Kazakhstan; Singapore
28 June–2 July 2016	Suva, Fiji	Fiji; Papua New Guinea; Solomon Islands; Tonga	1	Fiji
30 August–4 September 2016	Prague, Czech Republic	Czech Republic; Lithuania; Poland; Turkey; Ukraine	3	Czech Republic; Poland; Ukraine
9–11 September 2016	Accra, Ghana	Ghana; Kenya; Nigeria	1	Ghana
13–18 September 2016	Douai, France	Austria; France; Russia; Switzerland; Wales	3	Russia; Wales; France
27 September–2 October 2016	Salamanca, Mexico	Guatemala; Mexico; Trinidad and Tobago	1	Mexico
30 September–8 October 2016	Chiclayo, Peru	Brazil; Chile; Paraguay; Peru; Uruguay	2	Uruguay; Chile
12 October 2016	Appointed by FIH		1	Trinidad and Tobago

=== Round 2 ===
Dates	Location	Teams Qualified			Semifinals Quotas	Semifinals Qualifiers
Dates	Location	Host	By Ranking	From Round 1	Semifinals Quotas	Semifinals Qualifiers
14–22 January 2017	Kuala Lumpur, Malaysia	Malaysia	Ireland; Italy	~~Fiji~~^{1} Kazakhstan; Singapore; Thailand; Wales; Hong Kong	3	Ireland; Malaysia; Italy
4–12 February 2017	Valencia, Spain	Spain	Scotland; ~~Azerbaijan~~^{2}	Czech Republic; Ghana; Poland; Russia; Turkey; Ukraine	3	Spain; Poland; Scotland
1–9 April 2017	West Vancouver, Canada	Canada	Belarus; India	Chile; ~~France~~^{3} Mexico; Trinidad and Tobago; Uruguay	2	India; Chile

^1 – Fiji withdrew from participating and Hong Kong took their place.
^2 – Azerbaijan withdrew from participating and Turkey took their place.
^3 – France withdrew from participating.

=== Semifinals ===
Dates	Location	Teams Qualified			Final Quotas	Final Qualifiers
Dates	Location	Host	By Ranking	From Round 2	Final Quotas	Final Qualifiers
21 June–2 July 2017	Brussels, Belgium	Belgium	Australia; China; Netherlands; New Zealand; South Korea	Italy; Malaysia; Scotland; Spain	3	Netherlands; China; South Korea
8–23 July 2017	Johannesburg, South Africa	South Africa	Argentina; England; Germany; Japan; United States	Chile; India; Ireland; Poland	4	United States; Germany; England; Argentina

=== Final ===
Dates	Location	Teams Qualified	
Dates	Location	Host	From Semifinals
17–26 November 2017	Auckland, New Zealand	New Zealand	Argentina; China; England; Germany; Netherlands; South Korea; United States

== Final ranking ==
FIH issued a final ranking to determine the world ranking. The final ranking was as follows:

1. Netherlands
2. New Zealand
3. South Korea
4. England
5. Argentina
6. Germany
7. United States
8. China
9. Australia
10. South Africa
11. Japan
12. Italy
13. Ireland
14. Spain
15. Belgium
16. India
17. Chile
18. Scotland
19. Poland
20. Malaysia
21. Belarus
22. Wales
23. Uruguay
24. Ukraine
25. Czech Republic
26. Canada
27. Thailand
28. Russia
29. Mexico
30. Singapore
31. Turkey
32. Kazakhstan
33. Trinidad and Tobago
34. Ghana
35. Hong Kong
