= 2012–13 Women's FIH Hockey World League =

International field hockey competition

Tournament details
- Teams: 45
- Venue(s): 13 (in 13 host cities)

Final positions
- Champions: Netherlands (1st title)
- Runner-up: Australia
- Third place: England

Tournament statistics
- Matches played: 182
- Goals scored: 917 (5.04 per match)

The 2012–13 Women's FIH Hockey World League was the inaugural edition of the women's field hockey national team league series. The tournament started in August 2012 in Prague, Czech Republic and finished in December 2013 in San Miguel de Tucumán, Argentina.

The Semifinals of this competition also served as a qualifier for the 2014 Women's Hockey World Cup as the 6 highest placed teams apart from the host nation and the five continental champions qualified.

The Netherlands won the tournament's Final round for the first time after defeating Australia 5–1 in the final match. England won the third place match by defeating host nation Argentina 4–2 on a penalty shootout after a 1–1 draw.

== Qualification ==
Each national association member of the International Hockey Federation (FIH) had the opportunity to compete in the tournament, and after seeking entries to participate, 51 teams were announced to compete. However, for different reasons, the final count of participating teams was 45.

The 8 teams ranked between 1st and 8th in the FIH World Rankings current as of April 2011 received an automatic bye to the Semifinals while the 8 teams ranked between 9th and 16th received an automatic bye to Round 2. Those sixteen teams, shown with qualifying rankings, were the following:

- Argentina (1)
- Netherlands (2)
- Germany (3)
- China (4)
- England (5)
- Australia (6)
- New Zealand (7)
- South Korea (8)
- Japan (9)
- Spain (10)
- India (11)
- South Africa (12)
- United States (13)
- Azerbaijan (14)
- Ireland (15)
- Chile (16)

== Schedule ==
=== Round 1 ===
Dates	Location	Teams	Round 2 Quotas	Round 2 Qualifier(s)
14–19 August 2012	Prague, Czech Republic	Belarus; Czech Republic; France; Italy; Scotland; Turkey	4	Belarus; Italy; Scotland; Czech Republic
7–9 September 2012	Accra, Ghana	Ghana; Nigeria	1	Ghana
14–16 September 2012	Kuantan, Malaysia	Kazakhstan; Malaysia; Singapore; Sri Lanka	2	Malaysia; Kazakhstan
18–23 September 2012	Vienna, Austria	Austria; Belgium; Lithuania; Russia; Ukraine; Wales	4	Belgium; Russia; Ukraine; Austria
11–17 November 2012	Port of Spain, Trinidad and Tobago	Barbados; Canada; Guyana; Trinidad and Tobago; Uruguay; Venezuela	3	Canada; Uruguay; Trinidad and Tobago
8–15 December 2012	Suva, Fiji	Fiji; Papua New Guinea; Samoa; Vanuatu	1	Fiji

=== Round 2 ===
Dates	Location	Teams Qualified			Semifinals Quotas	Semifinals Qualifiers
Dates	Location	Host	By Ranking	From Round 1	Semifinals Quotas	Semifinals Qualifiers
21–27 January 2013	Cape Town, South Africa	South Africa	Azerbaijan	Austria; Belgium; Ghana; Canada^{1}	2	South Africa; Belgium
18–24 February 2013	New Delhi, India	India	Japan	Fiji; Kazakhstan; Malaysia; Russia	2	India; Japan
25 February – 3 March 2013	Valencia, Spain	Spain	Ireland	Belarus; Ukraine^{1} Czech Republic; Italy	2	Italy; Spain
4–10 March 2013	Rio de Janeiro, Brazil	Brazil	Chile; United States	Scotland; Trinidad and Tobago; Uruguay	2	United States; Chile

^1 – Ukraine and Canada withdrew from participating.

=== Semifinals ===
Dates	Location	Teams Qualified			Final Quotas	Final Qualifiers
Dates	Location	Host	By Ranking	From Round 2	Final Quotas	Final Qualifiers
13–22 June 2013	Rotterdam, Netherlands	Netherlands	Germany; New Zealand; South Korea	Belgium; Chile; India; Japan	4	Germany; Netherlands; South Korea; New Zealand
22–30 June 2013	London, England	England	Argentina; Australia; China	Italy; South Africa; Spain; United States	3	Australia; England; China

=== Final ===
Dates	Location	Teams Qualified	
Dates	Location	Host	From Semifinals
30 November – 8 December 2013	San Miguel de Tucumán, Argentina	Argentina	Australia; China; England; Germany; South Korea; Netherlands; New Zealand

== Final ranking ==
FIH issued a final ranking to determine the world ranking. The final ranking was as follows:

1. Netherlands
2. Australia
3. England
4. Argentina
5. New Zealand
6. China
7. Germany
8. South Korea
9. Japan
10. United States
11. Belgium
12. Italy
13. South Africa
14. India
15. Spain
16. Chile
17. Malaysia
18. Scotland
19. Belarus
20. Azerbaijan
21. Uruguay
22. Russia
23. Ireland
24. Austria
25. Trinidad and Tobago
26. Kazakhstan
27. Ghana
28. Czech Republic
29. Brazil
30. Fiji
