= Marcela Casale =

Italian-Argentine field hockey player

Personal information
- Born: 21 September 1986 (age 39)

Sport
- Sport: Field hockey
- Position: Midfielder
- Club: Marista Rugby Club
National team
Years	Team	Caps	Goals
–	Italy	55	-

Marcela Casale (born 21 September 1986) is an Italian-Argentine field hockey player for the Italian national team.

== Career ==
Socino received her first national team camp callup for Argentina in 2011.

She participated at the 2018 Women's Hockey World Cup.
