= Roberto Carta =

Italian field hockey coach

Roberto Carta is an Italian field hockey coach of the Italian women's national team.

He coached the team at the 2018 Women's Hockey World Cup.
