= 2005 Women's EuroHockey Nations Trophy =

Continental hockey tournament

Tournament details
- Host country: Azerbaijan
- City: Baku
- Dates: 5–11 September
- Teams: 8 (from 1 confederation)

Final positions
- Champions: Azerbaijan (1st title)
- Runner-up: Italy
- Third place: Russia

Tournament statistics
- Matches played: 20
- Goals scored: 67 (3.35 per match)

The 2005 Women's EuroHockey Nations Trophy was the first edition of the Women's EuroHockey Nations Trophy, the second level of the women's European field hockey championships organized by the European Hockey Federation. It was held from 5 to 11 September 2005 in Baku, Azerbaijan.

The hosts Azerbaijan won the first EuroHockey Nations Trophy title and were promoted to the 2007 EuroHockey Championship together with the runners-up Italy.

== Results ==
=== Preliminary round ===
==== Pool A ====
Pos	Team	Pld	W	D	L	GF	GA	GD	Pts	Qualification
1	Russia	3	2	1	0	9	3	+6	7	Semi-finals
2	Belgium	3	1	2	0	7	4	+3	5	Semi-finals
3	Lithuania	3	1	1	1	6	6	0	4	
4	Poland	3	0	0	3	2	11	−9	0	

Source: TheSports.org

5 September 2005
12:00

Russia	5–0	Poland

5 September 2005
14:00

Lithuania	2–2	Belgium

6 September 2005
16:00

Russia	1–1	Belgium

6 September 2005
18:00

Lithuania	2–1	Poland

8 September 2005
12:00

Russia	3–2	Lithuania

8 September 2005
14:00

Belgium	4–1	Poland

==== Pool B ====
Pos	Team	Pld	W	D	L	GF	GA	GD	Pts	Qualification
1	Italy	3	2	1	0	6	2	+4	7	Semi-finals
2	Azerbaijan (H)	3	2	1	0	5	2	+3	7	Semi-finals
3	Belarus	3	1	0	2	4	5	−1	3	
4	Wales	3	0	0	3	3	9	−6	0	

Source: TheSports.org
(H) Hosts

5 September 2005
16:00

Italy	2–1	Belarus

5 September 2005
18:00

Azerbaijan	3–1	Wales

7 September 2005
16:00

Italy	4–1	Wales

7 September 2005
18:00

Azerbaijan	2–1	Belarus

8 September 2005
16:00

Wales	1–2	Belarus

8 September 2005
18:00

Italy	0–0	Azerbaijan

=== Fifth to eighth place classification ===
5–8th place semi-finals
10 September
Lithuania	1
Wales	0
10 September
Belarus	3
Poland	1

Fifth place
11 September
Lithuania	1 (1)
Belarus (p.s.)	1 (2)
Seventh place
11 September
Wales	4
Poland	3

==== 5–8th place semi-finals ====
10 September 2005
10:00

Lithuania	1–0	Wales

10 September 2005
12:30

Belarus	3–1	Poland

==== Seventh place game ====
11 September 2005
10:30

Wales	4–3	Poland

==== Fifth place game ====
11 September 2005
13:00

Lithuania	1–1 (a.e.t.)	Belarus
Penalties
	1–2

=== First to fourth place classification ===
Semi-finals
10 September
Russia	0
Azerbaijan	4
10 September
Italy	1
Belgium	0

Final
11 September
Azerbaijan	1
Italy	0
Third place
11 September
Russia	3
Belgium	1

==== Semi-finals ====
10 September 2005
15:00

Russia	0–4	Azerbaijan

10 September 2005
17:30

Italy	1–0	Belgium

==== Third place game ====
11 September 2005
15:30

Russia	3–1	Belgium

==== Final ====
11 September 2005
18:00

Azerbaijan	1–0	Italy

== Final standings ==
Pos	Team	Qualification or relegation
1	Azerbaijan (H)	Qualification for the 2007 EuroHockey Championship
2	Italy	Qualification for the 2007 EuroHockey Championship
3	Russia	
4	Belgium	
5	Belarus	
6	Lithuania	
7	Wales	Relegation to the EuroHockey Nations Challenge I
8	Poland	Relegation to the EuroHockey Nations Challenge I

Source: Todor66
(H) Host

== See also ==
- 2005 Men's EuroHockey Nations Trophy
- 2005 Women's EuroHockey Nations Challenge I
- 2005 Women's EuroHockey Nations Championship
