= Celina Traverso =

Italian-Argentine field hockey player (born 1986)

Personal information
- Born: 17 March 1986 (age 40) Santa Fe, Argentina

Sport
- Sport: Field hockey
- Position: Defender
- Club: Santa Fe RC
National team
Years	Team	Caps	Goals
–	Italy	77	-

Celina Traverso (born 17 March 1986) is an Italian-Argentine field hockey player who played for the Italy national team.

She participated at the 2018 Women's Hockey World Cup.
