= 2009 Women's EuroHockey Nations Championship =

International field hockey competition

EURO 2009
- Official logo

Tournament details
- Host country: Netherlands
- City: Amsterdam
- Teams: 8
- Venue: Wagener Stadium

Final positions
- Champions: Netherlands (7th title)
- Runner-up: Germany
- Third place: England

Tournament statistics
- Matches played: 20
- Goals scored: 86 (4.3 per match)
- Top scorer: (Netherlands) Maartje Paumen (9 goals)

The 2009 Women's EuroHockey Nations Championship was the 9th edition of the women's field hockey championship organised by the European Hockey Federation. It was held from August 22 to August 29, 2009 in the Wagener Stadium in Amstelveen, Netherlands.

== Results ==
All times are Central European Summer Time (UTC+2)

=== Preliminary round ===
==== Pool A ====
Pos	Team	Pld	W	D	L	GF	GA	GD	Pts	Qualification
1	Netherlands	3	3	0	0	24	0	+24	9	Semi-finals
2	England	3	2	0	1	8	6	+2	6	Semi-finals
3	Azerbaijan	3	0	1	2	2	15	−13	1	
4	Russia	3	0	1	2	1	14	−13	1	

Source: EuroHockey
Rules for classification: 1) points; 2) goal difference; 3) goals scored; 4) head-to-head result.

22 August 2009
13:30

Netherlands	10–0	Azerbaijan
Lammers 14', 66', 68'; Dijkstra 23'; Hoog 26', 38'; Vorstenbosch 29'; Paumen 47', 52'; Welten 55'	Report

Umpires:
Anne McRae (SCO)
Carol Metchette (IRL)

22 August 2009
17:30

England	4–0	Russia
Richardson 6', 30'; Ellis 30'; Walton 66'	Report

Umpires:
Carolina de la Fuente (ARG)
Victoria del Olmo (ESP)

23 August 2009
15:30

Netherlands	5–0	England
Paumen 9', 56', 60', 65'; Lammers 32'	Report

Umpires:
Christiane Hippler (GER)
Lisa Roach (AUS)

23 August 2009
19:30

Azerbaijan	1–1	Russia
Jafarova	Report	Grigorieva

Umpires:
Carol Metchette (IRL)
Victoria del Olmo (ESP)

25 August 2009
17:30

Azerbaijan	1–4	England
Aliyeva 32'	Report	Rogers 16'; Danson 25'; Gilbert 38', 55'

Umpires:
Victoria del Olmo (ESP)
Lisa Roach (AUS)

25 August 2009
19:30

Netherlands	9–0	Russia
van As 2'; Paumen 13', 51', 62'; Lammers 17', 59', 60'; Dijkstra 20'; Agliotti 66'	Report

Umpires:
Anne McRae (SCO)
Christiane Hippler (GER)

==== Pool B ====
Pos	Team	Pld	W	D	L	GF	GA	GD	Pts	Qualification
1	Germany	3	3	0	0	13	1	+12	9	Semi-finals
2	Spain	3	2	0	1	8	4	+4	6	Semi-finals
3	Scotland	3	0	1	2	1	7	−6	1	
4	Ireland	3	0	1	2	1	11	−10	1	

Source: EuroHockey
Rules for classification: 1) points; 2) goal difference; 3) goals scored; 4) head-to-head result.

22 August 2009
09:30

Spain	3–1	Scotland
Huertas 7'; Muñoz 30'; Ybarra 37'	Report	Cram 37'

Umpires:
Lisa Roach (AUS)
Elena Eskina (RUS)

22 August 2009
11:30

Germany	7–0	Ireland
Kühn 10'; Keller 20'; Rinne 24', 38'; Stöckel 47', 60'; Müller 70'	Report

Umpires:
Tatyana Kaltypan (UKR)
Alison Murphy (ENG)

23 August 2009
09:30

Ireland	0–0	Scotland
	Report

Umpires:
Tatyana Kaltypan (UKR)
Elena Eskina (RUS)

23 August 2009
11:30

Germany	2–1	Spain
Stöckel 6'; Rinne 37'	Report	Camón 10'

Umpires:
Stella Bartlema (NED)
Carolina de la Fuente (ARG)

25 August 2009
13:30

Ireland	1–4	Spain
Sargeant 17'	Report	Cruz 12'; Piñiero 45'; Termens 55'; Bonastre 67'

Umpires:
Alison Murphy (ENG)
Elena Eskina (RUS)

25 August 2009
15:30

Germany	4–0	Scotland
Hoffmann 3'; Rinne 42'; Beermann 62', 68'	Report

Umpires:
Stella Bartlema (NED)
Tatyana Kaltypan (UKR)

=== Classification round ===
==== Fifth to eighth place classification ====
The third and fourth place team in each pool competed in a pool to determine the fifth to eighth-place winners. The last two placers will be relegated to EuroHockey Nations Trophy in 2011. Note that the match played against each other in pool A or B counts in the pool C classification.

===== Pool C =====
Pos	Team	Pld	W	D	L	GF	GA	GD	Pts	Relegation
1	Ireland	3	1	2	0	3	2	+1	5	
2	Azerbaijan	3	1	1	1	5	4	+1	4	
3	Russia	3	0	3	0	3	3	0	3	Relegated to EuroHockey Nations Championship II
4	Scotland	3	0	2	1	2	4	−2	2	Relegated to EuroHockey Nations Championship II

Source: EuroHockey
Rules for classification: 1) points; 2) goal difference; 3) goals scored; 4) head-to-head result.

27 August 2009
12:00

Russia	1–1	Scotland
Osipova 35'	Report	Clement 10'

Umpires:
Christiane Hippler (GER)
Victoria del Olmo (ESP)

27 August 2009
14:00

Azerbaijan	1–2	Ireland
Mammadova 49'	Report	Symmons 24'; Speers 62'

Umpires:
Alison Murphy (ENG)
Elena Eskina (RUS)

29 August 2009
08:30

Russia	1–1	Ireland
Shentsova 33'	Report	Jacob 13'

Umpires:
Alison Murphy (ENG)
Anne McRae (SCO)

29 August 2009
10:30

Azerbaijan	3–1	Scotland
Rustamova 5'; M. Aliyeva 59'; M. K. Aliyeva 70'	Report	Kidd 68'

Umpires:
Tatyana Kaltypan (UKR)
Christiane Hippler (GER)

==== First to fourth place classification ====
Semi-finals
27 August 2009
Netherlands	5
Spain	1
27 August 2009
Germany	2
England	1

Gold Medal
29 August 2009
Netherlands	3
Germany	2
Bronze Medal
29 August 2009
Spain	1
England	2

===== Semi-finals =====
27 August 2009
16:00

Netherlands	5–1	Spain
Agliotti 7'; Vorstenbosch 27', 28', 47' van As 42'	Report	Camón 64'

Umpires:
Carol Metchette (IRL)
Anne McRae (SCO)

27 August 2009
19:00

England	1–2 (a.e.t.)	Germany
Ellis 35'	Report	Keller 27'; Stöckel 76'

Umpires:
Carolina de la Fuente (ARG)
Stella Bartlema (NED)

===== Third and fourth place =====
29 August 2009
13:00

Spain	1–2	England
Muñoz 57'	Report	Rogers 7'; Walsh 43'

Umpires:
Stella Bartlema (NED)
Carol Metchette (IRL)

===== Final =====
29 August 2009
15:30

Netherlands	3–2	Germany
Welten 20'; Agliotti 25', 64'	Report	Stöckel 11'; Hasselmann 29'

Umpires:
Carolina de la Fuente (ARG)
Lisa Roach (AUS)

== Statistics ==
=== Final standings ===
As per statistical convention in field hockey, matches decided in extra time are counted as wins and losses, while matches decided by penalty shoot-outs are counted as draws.

Pos	Team	Pld	W	D	L	GF	GA	GD	Pts	Status
1st place, gold medalist(s)	Netherlands	5	5	0	0	32	3	+29	15	Qualified for 2010 FIH World Cup
2nd place, silver medalist(s)	Germany	5	4	0	1	17	5	+12	12	
3rd place, bronze medalist(s)	England	5	3	0	2	11	9	+2	9	
4	Spain	5	2	0	3	10	11	−1	6	
5	Ireland	5	1	2	2	4	13	−9	5	
6	Azerbaijan	5	1	1	3	6	18	−12	4	
7	Russia	5	0	3	2	3	16	−13	3	Relegated to EuroHockey Championship II
8	Scotland	5	0	2	3	3	11	−8	2	Relegated to EuroHockey Championship II

Source: EuroHockey

=== Goalscorers ===
There were 86 goals scored in 20 matches, for an average of 4.3 goals per match.

9 goals

- (Netherlands) Maartje Paumen

7 goals

- (Netherlands) Kim Lammers

5 goals

- (Germany) Maike Stöckel

4 goals

- (Germany) Fanny Rinne
- (Netherlands) Marilyn Agliotti
- (Netherlands) Vera Vorstenbosch

2 goals

- (Azerbaijan) Mi-Kyung Aliyeva
- (England) Joanne Ellis
- (England) Susannah Gilbert
- (England) Helen Richardson
- (England) Chloe Rogers
- (Germany) Janine Beermann
- (Germany) Natascha Keller
- (Netherlands) Naomi van As
- (Netherlands) Wieke Dijkstra
- (Netherlands) Ellen Hoog
- (Netherlands) Lidewij Welten
- (Spain) Núria Camón
- (Spain) Silvia Muñoz

1 goal

- (Azerbaijan) Marina Aliyeva
- (Azerbaijan) Inoyathon Jafarova
- (Azerbaijan) Zhun Mammadova
- (Azerbaijan) Seon-Yeong Rustamova
- (England) Alexandra Danson
- (England) Kate Walsh
- (England) Sally Walton
- (Germany) Nina Hasselmann
- (Germany) Eileen Hoffmann
- (Germany) Anke Kühn
- (Germany) Julia Müller
- (Ireland) Lisa Jacob
- (Ireland) Cliodhna Sargeant
- (Ireland) Alexandra Speers
- (Ireland) Nicola Symmons
- (Russia) Svetlana Grigorieva
- (Russia) Irina Osipova
- (Russia) Olga Shentsova
- (Scotland) Linda Clement
- (Scotland) Holly Cram
- (Scotland) Nicola Kidd
- (Spain) Silvia Bonastre
- (Spain) Montse Cruz
- (Spain) Raquel Huertas
- (Spain) Olalla Piñiero
- (Spain) Esther Termens
- (Spain) Rocío Ybarra

== See also ==
- 2009 Men's EuroHockey Nations Championship
- 2009 Women's EuroHockey Nations Trophy
