= 2009 Women's EuroHockey Nations Trophy =

Continental hockey tournament

Tournament details
- Host country: Italy
- City: Rome
- Dates: 19–25 July
- Teams: 8 (from 1 confederation)
- Venue: Centro Sportivo Giulio Onesti

Final positions
- Champions: Belgium (1st title)
- Runner-up: Italy
- Third place: Wales

Tournament statistics
- Matches played: 20
- Goals scored: 89 (4.45 per match)
- Top scorer: (Italy) Francesca Faustini (8 goals)
- Best player: (Italy) Francesca Faustini
- Best goalkeeper: (Belgium) Nadine Khouzam
- Fair play award: Wales

The 2009 Women's EuroHockey Nations Trophy was the third edition of the Women's EuroHockey Nations Trophy, the second level of the women's European field hockey championships organized by the European Hockey Federation. It was held from 19 to 25 July 2009 in Rome, Italy.

Belgium won its first EuroHockey Nations Trophy title and were promoted to the 2011 EuroHockey Championship together with the hosts Italy.

== Qualified teams ==
Dates	Event	Location	Quotas	Qualifiers
18–24 August 2007	2007 EuroHockey Championship	Manchester, England	2	Italy; Ukraine
2–9 September 2007	2007 EuroHockey Nations Trophy	Šiauliai, Lithuania	4	Belarus; Belgium; France; Lithuania
2–8 September 2007	2007 EuroHockey Challenge I	Zagreb, Croatia	2	Poland; Wales
Total			8	

== Officials ==
The following umpires were appointed by the FIH to officiate the tournament.

- Céline Martin-Schmets (BEL)
- Veranika Pekhtsiarova (BLR)
- Keely Dunn (CAN)
- Claire Adenot (FRA)
- Valentina Tomasi (ITA)
- Vilma Bagdanskienė (LTU)
- Mirjam Wessel (NED)
- Jolanta Malinowska (POL)
- Tatiana Kaltypan (UKR)
- Annabelle Willox (WAL)

== Results ==
=== Preliminary round ===
==== Pool A ====
Pos	Team	Pld	W	D	L	GF	GA	GD	Pts	Qualification
1	Italy (H)	3	3	0	0	10	1	+9	9	Semi-finals
2	France	3	2	0	1	7	7	0	6	Semi-finals
3	Belarus	3	1	0	2	7	9	−2	3	Pool C
4	Poland	3	0	0	3	4	11	−7	0	Pool C

Source: EHF
(H) Hosts

19 July 2009
17:45

France	2–1	Belarus
Prenez 11'; Begue 62'	Report	Laptsevich 55'

Umpires:
Tatiana Kaltypan (UKR)
Céline Martin-Schmets (BEL)

19 July 2009
20:00

Italy	1–0	Poland
Faustini 47'	Report

Umpires:
Keely Dunn (CAN)
Vilma Bagdanskienė (LTU)

21 July 2009
17:45

France	4–2	Poland
Boyer 19'; Roger 29'; Berly 37'; Prenez 39'	Report	Bugala 22'; Milewska 68'

Umpires:
Valentina Tomasi (ITA)
Vilma Bagdanskienė (LTU)

21 July 2009
20:00

Belarus	0–5	Italy
	Report	Faustini 18', 28', 50'; Canavosio 58'; Tiddi 63'

Umpires:
Annabelle Willox (WAL)
Tatiana Kaltypan (UKR)

22 July 2009
18:00

Belarus	6–2	Poland
Mikheichyk 21', 33'; Shyntar 27', 46'; Pyetukh 52'; Shcharbakova 56'	Report	Wiśniewska 51'; Wieloch 62'

Umpires:
Céline Martin-Schmets (BEL)
Valentina Tomasi (ITA)

22 July 2009
20:15

Italy	4–1	France
Faustini 14'; Singh 17', 41'; Quaranta 35'	Report	Lebaindre 15'

Umpires:
Annabelle Willox (WAL)
Jolanta Malinowska (POL)

==== Pool B ====
Pos	Team	Pld	W	D	L	GF	GA	GD	Pts	Qualification
1	Belgium	3	3	0	0	8	2	+6	9	Semi-finals
2	Wales	3	1	1	1	4	3	+1	4	Semi-finals
3	Ukraine	3	1	0	2	3	8	−5	3	Pool C
4	Lithuania	3	0	1	2	6	8	−2	1	Pool C

Source: EHF

19 July 2009
09:45

Ukraine	0–2	Wales
	Report	Mitchell 4'; Jones 15'

Umpires:
Mirjam Wessel (NED)
Veranika Pekhtsiarova (BLR)

19 July 2009
12:00

Belgium	3–2	Lithuania
Gierts 44'; Boon 49'; De Vos 65'	Report	Juodytė 35'; Nyderytė 40'

Umpires:
Claire Adenot (FRA)
Jolanta Malinowska (POL)

20 July 2009
17:45

Ukraine	3–2	Lithuania
Vynohradova 5', 19'; Moroz 35'	Report	Jakaitė 7', 31'

Umpires:
Valentina Tomasi (ITA)
Keely Dunn (CAN)

20 July 2009
20:00

Wales	0–1	Belgium
	Report	Gierts 45'

Umpires:
Mirjam Wessel (NED)
Veranika Pekhtsiarova (BLR)

22 July 2009
09:00

Wales	2–2	Lithuania
Hopkins 61'; Thomas 69'	Report	Malyseka 24'; Bardauskaitė 42'

Umpires:
Keely Dunn (CAN)
Mirjam Wessel (NED)

22 July 2009
11:15

Belgium	4–0	Ukraine
Vermeersch 3'; Sinia 19'; Gierts 33', 69'	Report

Umpires:
Claire Adenot (FRA)
Veranika Pekhtsiarova (BLR)

=== Fifth to eighth place classification ===
==== Pool C ====
The points obtained in the preliminary round against the other team are taken over.

Pos	Team	Pld	W	D	L	GF	GA	GD	Pts	Relegation
5	Belarus	3	2	1	0	10	3	+7	7	
6	Ukraine	3	2	1	0	8	5	+3	7	
7	Poland	3	1	0	2	12	12	0	3	Relegation to EuroHockey Championship III
8	Lithuania	3	0	0	3	4	14	−10	0	Relegation to EuroHockey Championship III

Source: EHF

24 July 2009
09:00

Poland	2–4	Ukraine
Grzanka 7'; Rybacha 40'	Report	Vynohradova 13', 23'; Sadova 21', 30'

Umpires:
Annabelle Willox (WAL)
Vilma Bagdanskienė (LTU)

24 July 2009
11:15

Belarus	3–0	Lithuania
Mikheichyk 18'; Zhylianina 39'; Bahushevich 59'	Report

Umpires:
Claire Adenot (FRA)
Valentina Tomasi (ITA)

25 July 2009
09:00

Poland	8–2	Lithuania
Krug 6', 64'; Wiśniewska 13'; Rybacha 26'; Bugala 30', 54', 61'; Krasińska 65'	Report	Dildaitė 50'; Griskutė 68'

Umpires:
Claire Adenot (FRA)
Annabelle Willox (WAL)

25 July 2009
11:15

Belarus	1–1	Ukraine
Shyntar 44'	Report	Hlynenko 27'

Umpires:
Jolanta Malinowska (POL)
Vilma Bagdanskienė (LTU)

=== First to fourth place classification ===
Semi-finals
24 July
Italy (a.e.t.)	3
Wales	2
24 July
Belgium	6
France	2

Final
25 July
Italy	2
Belgium	3
Third place
25 July
Wales	1
France	0

==== Semi-finals ====
24 July 2009
18:00

Belgium	6–2	France
Boon 21'; Meuwese 24'; Vermeersch 28'; De Vos 47', 52'; Gierts 51'	Report	Rogeau 3'; Berly 42'

Umpires:
Tatiana Kaltypan (UKR)
Mirjam Wessel (NED)

24 July 2009
20:30

Italy	3–2 (a.e.t.)	Wales
Faustini 30', 47'; Singh 72'	Report	Humphreys 32'; Jones 65'

Umpires:
Keely Dunn (CAN)
Céline Martin-Schmets (BEL)

==== Third place game ====
25 July 2009
17:30

Wales	1–0	France
Robinson 54'	Report

Umpires:
Mirjam Wessel (NED)
Céline Martin-Schmets (BEL)

==== Final ====
25 July 2009
20:00

Italy	2–3	Belgium
Faustini 18'; Tiddi 23'	Report	Gierts 2'; De Vos 37'; Bouche 54'

Umpires:
Keely Dunn (CAN)
Tatiana Kaltypan (UKR)

== Awards ==
The following awards were presented at the conclusion of the tournament.

Player of the Tournament	Top Goalscorer	Goalkeeper of the Tournament	Fair Play
(Italy) Francesca Faustini	(Italy) Francesca Faustini	(Belgium) Nadine Khouzam	Wales

== Final standings ==
As per statistical convention in field hockey, matches decided in extra time are counted as wins and losses, while matches decided by penalty shoot-outs are counted as draws.

Pos	Team	Pld	W	D	L	GF	GA	GD	Pts	Status
1st place, gold medalist(s)	Belgium	5	5	0	0	17	6	+11	15	Qualified for 2011 EuroHockey Championship
2nd place, silver medalist(s)	Italy	5	4	0	1	15	6	+9	12	Qualified for 2011 EuroHockey Championship
3rd place, bronze medalist(s)	Wales	5	2	1	2	7	6	+1	7	
4	France	5	2	0	3	9	14	−5	6	
5	Belarus	5	2	1	2	11	10	+1	7	
6	Ukraine	5	2	1	2	8	11	−3	7	
7	Poland	5	1	0	4	14	17	−3	3	Relegated to EuroHockey Championship III
8	Lithuania	5	0	1	4	8	19	−11	1	Relegated to EuroHockey Championship III

Source: EHF

== Goalscorers ==
There were 89 goals scored in 20 matches, for an average of 4.45 goals per match.

8 goals

- (Italy) Francesca Faustini

6 goals

- (Belgium) Sofie Gierts

4 goals

- (Belgium) Charlotte de Vos
- (Poland) Aleksandra Bugala
- (Ukraine) Maryna Vynohradova

3 goals

- (Belarus) Yuliya Mikheichyk
- (Belarus) Volha Shyntar
- (Italy) Jasbeer Singh

2 goals

- (Belgium) Jill Boon
- (Belgium) Valerie Vermeersch
- (France) Philippine Berly
- (France) Elise Prenez
- (Italy) Chiara Tiddi
- (Lithuania) Dovile Jakaitė
- (Poland) Sylwia Krug
- (Poland) Marlena Rybacha
- (Poland) Natalia Wiśniewska
- (Ukraine) Bohdana Sadova
- (Wales) Philippa Jones

1 goal

- (Belarus) Sviatlana Bahushevich
- (Belarus) Yulia Laptsevich
- (Belarus) Alesia Pyetukh
- (Belarus) Nastassia Shcharbakova
- (Belarus) Ryta Zhylianina
- (Belgium) Olivia Bouche
- (Belgium) Dorianne Meuwese
- (Belgium) Emilie Sinia
- (France) Emilie Begue
- (France) Charlotte Boyer
- (France) Louise Lebaindre
- (France) Apolline Rogeau
- (France) Perrine Roger
- (Italy) Matilde Canavosio
- (Italy) Valentina Quaranta
- (Lithuania) Aušra Bardauskaitė
- (Lithuania) Donata Dildaitė
- (Lithuania) Aurelija Griskutė
- (Lithuania) Jurate Juodytė
- (Lithuania) Evelina Malyseka
- (Lithuania) Raimonda Nyderytė
- (Poland) Anna Grzanska
- (Poland) Katarzyna Krasińska
- (Poland) Monika Milewska
- (Poland) Joanna Wieloch
- (Ukraine) Alyna Hlynenko
- (Ukraine) Yevheniya Moroz
- (Wales) Carys Hopkins
- (Wales) Kayleigh Humphreys
- (Wales) Dawn Mitchell
- (Wales) Sophie Robinson
- (Wales) Sarah Thomas

Source: EHF

== See also ==
- 2009 Men's EuroHockey Nations Trophy
- 2009 Women's EuroHockey Nations Championship
