= Belarus women's national field hockey team =

Belarus
- Association: Hockey Belarus
- Confederation: EHF (Europe)
- Head Coach: Herman Kruis
- Assistant coach(es): Pavel Habryneuski
- Manager: Aliaksandr Hrachou
- Captain: Ryta Batura

FIH ranking
- Current: 20 (4 March 2025)

EuroHockey Championship
- Appearances: 2 (first in 2013)
- Best result: 8th (2013, 2019)

The Belarus women's national field hockey team represents Belarus in women's international field hockey.

The team mainly plays in the Women's EuroHockey Championship II, but qualified for the 2019 Women's EuroHockey Nations Championship, by ending first in the 2017 Women's EuroHockey Championship II.

In response to the 2022 Russian invasion of Ukraine, the FIH banned Belarusian officials from FIH events.

== Tournament history ==
=== EuroHockey Championship ===
- 2013 – 8th place
- 2019 – 8th place

=== EuroHockey Championship II ===
- 2005 – 5th place
- 2007 – 4th place
- 2009 – 5th place
- 2011 – (silver)
- 2015 – (bronze)
- 2017 – (gold)
- 2021 – (gold)

=== Hockey World League ===
- 2012–13 – 19th place
- 2014–15 – 23rd place
- 2016–17 – 21st place

=== FIH Hockey Series ===
- 2018–19 – Second round

== See also ==
- Belarus men's national field hockey team
