= Lithuania women's national field hockey team =

Lithuania
- Association: Lithuanian Field Hockey Federation
- Confederation: EHF (Europe)
- Head Coach: Casper Claassen
- Manager: Joana Gaidamavičienė
- Captain: Dovile Kukliene

FIH ranking
- Current: 53 ▼3 (11 June 2026)

EuroHockey Championship
- Appearances: 1 (first in 1999)
- Best result: 8th (1999)

The Lithuania women's national field hockey team represents Lithuania in women's international field hockey competitions.

== Tournament history ==
=== European championships ===
==== EuroHockey Championship ====
- 1999 – 8th place

==== EuroHockey Championship II ====
- 2005 – 6th place
- 2007 – 6th place
- 2009 – 8th place
- 2013 – 8th place
- 2021 – 8th place
- 2023 – 7th place

==== EuroHockey Championship III ====
- 2011 – (gold)
- 2015 – (silver)
- 2017 – (bronze)
- 2019 – (silver)

=== Hockey World League ===
- 2012–13 – Round 1
- 2014–15 – 31st place
- 2016–17 – Round 1

=== FIH Hockey Series ===
- 2018–19 – First round

== Results and fixtures ==
The following is a list of match results in the last 12 months, as well as any future matches that have been scheduled.

Win Draw Loss Fixture

=== 2026 ===
9 July 2026 EU Championship Qualifiers QF	Czech Republic	1–0	Lithuania	Prague, Czech Republic
17:45	Hájková 52'	Report

10 July 2026 EU Championship Qualifiers 5/8 Classification	Turkey	0–2	Lithuania	Prague, Czech Republic
17:45		Report	Soto 7'; Jakovleva 51'

12 July 2026 EU Championship Qualifiers 5/6 Classification	Switzerland	3–2	Lithuania	Prague, Czech Republic
11:30	Trösch 13'; Stomps 23', 32'	Report	Juraitė 35'; Soto 36'

== See also ==
- Lithuania men's national field hockey team
