= Italy women's national field hockey team =

Italy
- Association: EHF (Europe)
- Confederation: Federazione Italiana Hockey
- Head Coach: Massimo Lanzano
- Assistant coach(es): Fabrizio Mattei
- Manager: Gianluca Cirilli
- Captain: Sara Puglisi
| Home | Away |

FIH ranking
- Current: 20 ▼1 (23 September 2026)

World Cup
- Appearances: 2 (first in 1976)
- Best result: 9th (2018)

EuroHockey Championship
- Appearances: 9 (first in 1984)
- Best result: 7th (2007, 2015)

The Italy women's national field hockey team represents Italy in international field hockey competitions. The team is currently ranked 18 th in the FIH World Rankings, with 623 points.

== History ==
Field hockey was first introduced in Italy in 1935, and has since grown in popularity within the country.

In July 2017, at the 2016–17 Hockey World League Semifinals in Brussels, Belgium, the Italian women's team secured qualification for the 2018 Hockey World Cup. This is the first major international tournament Italy have qualified for since the 1976 Hockey World Cup, where the team finished 10th.

== Tournament history ==
World Cup
| Year | Host city | Position |
|---|---|---|
| 1976 | West Berlin, West Germany | 10th |
| 2018 | London, England | 9th |

World League
| Year | Round | Host city | Position |
|---|---|---|---|
| 2012–13 | Round 1 | Prague, Czech Republic | 2nd |
| 2012–13 | Round 2 | Valencia, Spain | 1st |
| 2012–13 | Semi-final | London, England | 6th |
| 2014–15 | Round 2 | Montevideo, Uruguay | 1st |
| 2014–15 | Semi-final | Antwerp, Belgium | 8th |
| 2016–17 | Round 2 | Kuala Lumpur, Malaysia | 3rd |
| 2016–17 | Semi-final | Brussels, Belgium | 6th |

Champions Challenge
Champions Challenge I
| Year | Host city | Position |
|---|---|---|
| 2002 | Johannesburg, South Africa | – |
| 2003 | Catania, Italy | 6th |
2005 – 2007 Did not Compete
| 2009 | Cape Town, South Africa | 6th |
2012 – 2014 Did not Compete
Champions Challenge II
| Year | Host city | Position |
| 2011 | Vienna, Austria | 2nd |

European Championships
EuroHockey Nations Championship
| Year | Host city | Position |
|---|---|---|
| 1984 | Lille, France | 12th |
| 1987 | London, England | 11th |
| 1991 | Brussels, Belgium | 11th |
| 1995 | Amsterdam, Netherlands | 9th |
| 2003 | Barcelona, Spain | 11th |
| 2007 | Manchester, England | 7th |
| 2011 | Mönchengladbach, Germany | 8th |
| 2015 | London, England | 7th |
| 2021 | Amstelveen, Netherlands | 8th |
| 2023 | Mönchengladbach, Germany | 8th |
EuroHockey Nations Championship II
| Year | Host city | Position |
| 2005 | Baku, Azerbaijan | 2nd |
| 2009 | Rome, Italy | 2nd |
| 2013 | Cambrai, France | 1st |
| 2017 | Cardiff, Wales | 3rd |
| 2019 | Glasgow, Scotland | 2nd |

Hockey Nations Cup
| Year | Host city | Position |
|---|---|---|
| 2022 | Valencia, Spain | 5th |
| 2023–24 | Terrassa, Spain | 7th |

Hockey Nations Cup 2
| Year | Host city | Position |
|---|---|---|
| 2024–25 | Wałcz, Poland | 6th |

Hockey Series
| Year | Round | Host city | Position |
|---|---|---|---|
| 2018–19 | Final | Valencia, Spain | 3rd |

== Current roster ==
The following players were called to compete in the 2026 World Cup qualifiers from 8 to 14 March in Hyderabad, India.

Players, caps and goals updated as of 8 March 2026.

Head coach: Massimo Lanzano

| No. | Pos. | Player | Date of birth (age) | Caps | Goals | Club |
|---|---|---|---|---|---|---|
| 12 | GK | Lucía Caruso | 30 September 1997 (age 28) | 31 | | (Argentina) St. George's |
| 32 | GK | Cecilia Pastor | 15 May 1989 (age 37) | 1 | | (Italy) SG Amsicora |
| 2 | DF | Maria Torbol | 12 July 2004 (age 22) | 1 | 0 | (Italy) Riva |
| 3 | DF | Teresa Dalla Vittoria | 1 January 1997 (age 29) | 63 | 2 | (Belgium) Royal Herakles |
| 16 | DF | Ilaria Sarnari | 8 December 1999 (age 26) | 23 | 0 | (Belgium) Royal Evere White Star |
| 21 | DF | Sara Puglisi (Captain) | 3 August 2000 (age 26) | 64 | 0 | (Netherlands) Oranje-Rood |
| 26 | DF | Sofía Laurito | 10 January 1994 (age 32) | 60 | 8 | (Belgium) Royal Orée |
| 28 | DF | Ivanna Pessina | 18 April 1990 (age 36) | 72 | 8 | (Belgium) Braxgata HC |
| 5 | MF | Ailin Oviedo | 2 March 1991 (age 35) | 42 | 3 | (Spain) Real Sociedad |
| 6 | MF | Martina Grinbaum | 18 September 2000 (age 26) | 2 | 0 | (Belgium) Beerschot |
| 9 | MF | Guadalupe Moras | 20 March 2001 (age 25) | 24 | 3 | (Belgium) Royal Racing Club de Bruxelles |
| 17 | MF | Elettra Bormida | 18 November 1998 (age 27) | 43 | 1 | (Belgium) Royal Herakles |
| 22 | MF | Agustina Fiorelli | 20 March 1997 (age 29) | 13 | 1 | (Italy) SG Amsicora |
| 27 | MF | Sofía Maldonado | 3 January 1995 (age 31) | 30 | 2 | (Italy) HF Lorenzoni |
| 7 | FW | Emilia Munitis | 6 May 1996 (age 30) | 51 | 4 | (Belgium) Royal Uccle Sport |
| 8 | FW | Eleonora di Paola | 10 November 2007 (age 18) | 2 | 0 | (Italy) Butterfly Roma |
| 13 | FW | Lola Brea | 29 October 2000 (age 25) | 12 | 7 | (Spain) Egara |
| 15 | FW | María Paz Lunghi | 9 December 1997 (age 28) | 17 | 6 | (Belgium) Royal Herakles |
| 18 | FW | Federica Carta (Captain) | 21 June 2000 (age 26) | 81 | 34 | (Spain) Real Sociedad |
| 25 | FW | Delfina Granatto | 16 December 1996 (age 29) | 14 | 2 | (Belgium) Bremer |

== Results and fixtures ==
The following is a list of match results in the last 12 months, as well as any future matches that have been scheduled.

Win Draw Loss Fixture

=== 2026 ===
==== 2026 Women's FIH World Cup Qualifiers ====
| 8 March 2026 Pool A | England | 5–2 | Italy | Hyderabad, India |
| 12:45 | Balsdon 12', 32'; Bingham 15'; Neal 16'; Toman 27' | Report | Pessina 19'; Carta 46' | Stadium: G. M. C. Balayogi Hockey Ground |

| 9 March 2026 Pool A | Italy | 3–0 | Austria | Hyderabad, India |
| 12:45 | Carta 19'; Brea 21'; Di Paola 45' | Report | | Stadium: G. M. C. Balayogi Hockey Ground |

| 11 March 2026 Pool A | Italy | 1–1 | South Korea | Hyderabad, India |
| 15:00 | Carta 7' | Report | Choi J. 26' | Stadium: G. M. C. Balayogi Hockey Ground |

| 13 March 2026 Semi Final | India | 1–0 | Italy | Hyderabad, India |
| 19:30 | Chauhan 40' | Report | | Stadium: G. M. C. Balayogi Hockey Ground |

| 14 March 2026 3/4 Classification | Scotland | 1–0 | Italy | Hyderabad, India |
| 17:15 | Costello 7' | Report | | Stadium: G. M. C. Balayogi Hockey Ground |

== Squad records in official competitions ==
=== 2020-Present ===
| Jersey # | Competitions | | | | | | | | | | |
| Jersey # | 2021 | | 2022 | | 2023 | 2024 | | | 2025 | | 2026 |
| Jersey # | EC | WCEQ | ECQ | NC | EC | OQ | NC | ECQ | NC2 | EC2 | WCQ |
|---|---|---|---|---|---|---|---|---|---|---|---|
| 1 | Monserrat | | Monserrat | | | | | | | | |
| 2 | | Traverso | | | | | | | | | Torbol |
| 3 | Dalla Vittoria | | Dalla Vittoria | | | | | | | | |
| 4 | Sarnari | | | | | | Sarnari | | Cabut | | |
| 5 | Oviedo A. | | Oviedo A. | | | | | Oviedo A. | | | |
| 6 | | | | Hasselstrom | | | | | Franceschini | | Grinbaum |
| 7 | | | | Bormida | | | | | | | Munitis |
| 8 | | | Bianchi | | | | | | | | di Paola |
| 9 | Munitis | | Munitis | | | | | | Moras | | |
| 10 | | Mirabella | | | Mirabella | | | | | | |
| 11 | Ayala | Socino | | | Rinaldi | | | | | | |
| 12 | | Caruso | | | | | | | | | Caruso |
| 13 | Moroni | | | | | | | | Brea | | |
| 14 | | Bruni | | | | | | | | | |
| 15 | Maldonado | | | | | | | | Lunghi | | |
| 16 | de Biase | | | | | | | | Sarnari | | |
| 17 | Tiddi | | | | | | | | Bormida | | |
| 18 | Carta | | | | | | | | | | |
| 19 | di Mauro | | | | Carosso | | | Carosso | | Carosso | |
| 20 | Aguirre | | | | | | | | | | |
| 21 | Puglisi | | | | | | | | | | |
| 22 | | | | | | | | | Fiorelli | | |
| 23 | | Bertarini | | | | | | | | | |
| 24 | Fernández | Borgia | | | | | | | Aspillaga | | |
| 25 | | Pastor M. | | | | | | | Granatto | | |
| 26 | Laurito | | Laurito | | | | | | | | |
| 27 | Oviedo L. | | | | | | | | | | Maldonado |
| 28 | Pessina | | | | | | | | | | Pessina |
| 29 | | Galimberti | | | | | | | | | |
| 30 | | | Machín | | | | | | | | |
| 32 | | | | | | | | | D'Ascola | | Pastor C. |
| 33 | | | | | | Moras | | | | | |
| 34 | | | | | | Inaudi | | | | | |
| 35 | | | | | | Alemán | | | | | |
| 44 | | | | | di Bella | | | | | | |
| 47 | | | | | | | Cabut | | | | |
| 50 | | | | | | | | Fiorelli | | | |
| 51 | | | | | | | Gilardi | | | | |
| 52 | | | | | | | | Granatto | | | |
| 53 | | | | | | | Lunghi | | | | |
| 54 | | | | | | | Manzoni | | | | |
| 99 | | | | | | | | | Omegna | | |
| HC | Roberto Carta | | Robert Justus | | | Andrés Mondo | | | | | Massimo Lanzano |
| Result | 8th | 5th | 1st place, gold medalist(s) | 5th | 8th | 6th | 7th | 3rd place, bronze medalist(s) | 6th | 1st place, gold medalist(s) | TBD |
