= Czech Republic women's national field hockey team =

Czech Republic
- Association: Czech Hockey Federation
- Confederation: EHF (Europe)
- Head Coach: Gino Schilders
- Assistant coach(es): Tomas Procházka; Radim Valigura
- Manager: Lukáš Derbal
- Captain: Tereza Mejzlíková

FIH ranking
- Current: 28 (11 June 2026)

EuroHockey Championship
- Appearances: 3 (first in 1995)
- Best result: 7th (2017)

The Czech Republic women's national field hockey team represents the Czech Republic in international women's field hockey competitions.

== Tournament record ==
=== EuroHockey Championship ===
- 1995 – 10th place
- 1999 – 12th place
- 2017 – 7th place

=== EuroHockey Championship II ===
- 2007 – 7th place
- 2015 – (silver)
- 2019 – 6th place
- 2021 – 6th place
- 2023 – (silver)

=== EuroHockey Championship III ===
- 2005 – (gold)
- 2009 – (silver)
- 2011 – (bronze)
- 2013 – (silver)

=== Hockey Nations Cup 2 ===
- 2024–25 – 5th place

=== Hockey World League ===
- 2012–13 – 28th place
- 2014–15 – Round 1
- 2016–17 – 25th place

=== FIH Hockey Series ===
- 2018–19 – Second round

== Results and fixtures ==
The following is a list of match results in the last 12 months, as well as any future matches that have been scheduled.

Win Draw Loss Fixture

=== 2026 ===
9 July 2026 EU Championship Qualifiers QF	Czech Republic	1–0	Lithuania	Prague, Czech Republic
17:45	Hájková 52'	Report

11 July 2026 EU Championship Qualifiers SF	Austria	1–0	Czech Republic	Prague, Czech Republic
15:15	Czech 11'	Report

12 July 2026 EU Championship Qualifiers Third place match	Poland	1–0	Czech Republic	Prague, Czech Republic
13:45	Pabiniak 15'	Report

== See also ==
- Czech Republic men's national field hockey team
