= Russia women's national field hockey team =

Russia
- Association: Russian Field Hockey Federation
- Confederation: EHF (Europe)
- Head Coach: Oleg Potapov
- Assistant coach(es): Edik Arutiunian; Valentina Apelganets
- Manager: Mikhail Mokrushin
- Captain: Bogdana Sadovaia

FIH ranking
- Current: 22 (4 March 2025)

World Cup
- Appearances: 2 (first in 1994)
- Best result: 12th (1994)

EuroHockey Championship
- Appearances: 5 (first in 1995)
- Best result: 4th (1999)

The Russia women's national field hockey team represents Russia in women's international field hockey. The team mainly plays in the Women's EuroHockey Championship II, but qualified for the 2019 Women's EuroHockey Nations Championship by finishing second in the 2017 Women's EuroHockey Championship II.

Because of the 2022 Russian invasion of Ukraine, the FIH banned Russia from the Women's FIH Hockey Junior World Cup in April 2022, and banned Russian and Belarusian officials from FIH events. In addition, the European Hockey Federation banned the participation of all Russian athletes and officials from all events sanctioned by the Federation.

== Tournament record ==
=== World Cup ===
- 1994 – 12th place
- 2002 – 16th place

=== EuroHockey Championship ===
- 1995 – 5th place
- 1999 – 4th place
- 2003 – 10th place
- 2009 – 7th place
- 2019 – 7th place

=== EuroHockey Championship II ===
- 2005 – (bronze)
- 2007 – (silver)
- 2011 – (bronze)
- 2013 – 7th place
- 2017 – (silver)
- 2021 – 5th place

=== EuroHockey Championship III ===
- 2015 – (gold)

=== Hockey World League ===
- 2012–13 – 22nd place
- 2014–15 – 27th place
- 2016–17 – 28th place

== See also ==
- Russia men's national field hockey team
- Soviet Union women's national field hockey team
