= Ukraine women's national field hockey team =

Ukraine
- Association: Ukrainian Field Hockey Federation
- Confederation: EHF (Europe)

FIH ranking
- Current: 29 (11 June 2026)

World Cup
- Appearances: 1 (first in 2002)
- Best result: 14th (2002)

EuroHockey Championship
- Appearances: 4 (first in 1999)
- Best result: 5th (2003)

The Ukrainian women's national field hockey team represents Ukraine in the international field hockey competitions. The team is coached by Victor Kostyukevych.

== Competitive record ==
=== Hockey World Cup ===
Women's Hockey World Cup record
Year	Round	Position	Pld	W	D	L	GF	GA
Australia 2002	Group stage	14th	9	2	2	5	16	29

=== EuroHockey Championship ===
EuroHockey Championship record
Year	Round	Position	Pld	W	D	L	GF	GA
Germany 1999	Group stage	7th	7	3	0	4	12	22
Spain 2003	Group stage	5th	7	3	2	2	19	22
(Republic of Ireland) Ireland 2005	Group stage	6th	5	1	1	3	4	14
England 2007	Group stage	8th	5	0	0	5	3	17
England 2027	Qualified							

=== EuroHockey Championship II ===
- 2009 – 6th place
- 2011 – 5th place
- 2013 – 6th place
- 2015 – 8th place
- 2017 – 6th place
- 2019 – 7th place
- 2023 – 4th place
- 2025 – Withdrew

=== EuroHockey Championship III ===
- 2021 – (gold)
- 2025 – (gold)

=== Hockey World League ===
- 2012–13 – Round 1
- 2014–15 – 32nd place
- 2016–17 – 24th place

=== Women's Hockey Series ===
- 2018–19 – Second round

== Results and fixtures ==
The following is a list of match results in the last 12 months, as well as any future matches that have been scheduled.

Win Draw Loss Fixture

=== 2026 ===
==== Test match ====
19 June 2026 Test	Morocco	0–8	Ukraine	Amsterdam, Netherlands
20:00		Report	Voievoda 3', 14', 38'; Leonova 8', 15'; Honcharenko 17'; Zaitseva 26'; Basanets 43'	Stadium: SBHC Xenios

==== EuroHockey Championship Qualifier I ====
9 July 2026 QF	Switzerland	1–3	Ukraine	Prague, Czech Republic
11:00	Stomps 23'	Report	Honcharenko 2'; Leonova 6', 49'

11 July 2026 SF	Ukraine	2–1	Poland	Prague, Czech Republic
13:00	Basanets 37'; Honcharenko 45'	Report	Wochna 35'

12 July 2026 Final	Ukraine	2–3	Austria	Prague, Czech Republic
16:00	Korobkina 4'; Leonova 15'	Report	Buchleitner 13'; Czech 58'; Buchta 59'

== See also ==
- Ukraine men's national field hockey team
