= Austria women's national field hockey team =

Austria
- Association: Österreichischer Hockeyverband
- Confederation: EHF (Europe)
- Head Coach: Christian Hoffmann
- Assistant coach(es): Nitan Sondhi
- Manager: Susanne Dvorak
- Captain: Johanna Czech

FIH ranking
- Current: 33 ▲1 (11 June 2026)

Olympic Games
- Appearances: 1 (first in 1980)
- Best result: 5th (1980)

World Cup
- Appearances: 3 (first in 1974)
- Best result: 8th (1974)

EuroHockey Championship
- Appearances: 3 (first in 1984)
- Best result: 11th (1984)

The Austria women's national field hockey team represents Austria in international women's field hockey. In its only appearance at the Olympic Games, in Moscow in 1980, it finished fifth out of six teams.

== Tournament record ==
=== Summer Olympics ===
- 1980 – 5th place

=== World Cup ===
- 1974 – 8th place
- 1976 – 9th place
- 1981 – 12th place

=== EuroHockey Championship ===
- 1984 – 11th place
- 1987 – 12th place
- 1991 – 12th place
- 2027 – Qualified

=== EuroHockey Championship II ===
- 2007 – 8th place
- 2013 – 5th place
- 2015 – 7th place
- 2017 – 7th place
- 2019 – 4th place
- 2021 – 7th place
- 2023 – 6th place

=== EuroHockey Championship III ===
- 2005 – (silver)
- 2009 – (bronze)
- 2011 – (silver)

=== Hockey World League ===
- 2012–13 – 24th place
- 2014–15 – 28th place
- 2016–17 – Round 1

=== FIH Hockey Series ===
- 2018–19 – First round

== Results and fixtures ==
The following is a list of match results in the last 12 months, as well as any future matches that have been scheduled.

Win Draw Loss Fixture

=== 2026 ===
==== 2026 Women's FIH World Cup Qualifiers ====
8 March 2026 Pool A	South Korea	1–0	Austria	Hyderabad, India
15:00	Kim 34'	Report		Stadium: G. M. C. Balayogi Hockey Ground

9 March 2026 Pool A	Italy	3–0	Austria	Hyderabad, India
12:45	Carta 19'; Brea 21'; Di Paola 45'	Report		Stadium: G. M. C. Balayogi Hockey Ground

11 March 2026 Pool A	England	2–0	Austria	Hyderabad, India
12:45	Balsdon 20'; Hunt 48'	Report		Stadium: G. M. C. Balayogi Hockey Ground

13 March 2026 5/8 Classification	Uruguay	3–0	Austria	Hyderabad, India
15:00	Vilar 4'; Viana 21', 44'	Report		Stadium: G. M. C. Balayogi Hockey Ground

14 March 2026 7/8 Classification	South Korea	1–1 (1–2 p)	Austria	Hyderabad, India
12:45	Lee 31'	Report	Vukovich 3'	Stadium: G. M. C. Balayogi Hockey Ground
	Penalties
	Yu-jin (penalty shoot-out scored); Kim (penalty shoot-out missed); Park (penalty shoot-out missed); Choi (penalty shoot-out missed); Lee (penalty shoot-out missed)		(penalty shoot-out scored) Czech; (penalty shoot-out missed) Proksch; (penalty shoot-out missed) Kern; (penalty shoot-out missed) Bauer; (penalty shoot-out scored) Kemper

==== Poland Test series ====
27 June 2026 Test 1	Austria	2–3	Poland	Wiener Neudorf, Austria
09:30	Bauer 20'; Hahnenkamp 59'	Report	Blaszyk 9', 43'; Wochna 57'

28 June 2026 Test 2	Austria	2–1	Poland	Wiener Neudorf, Austria
09:30	Pultar 29'; Haselsteiner 36'	Report	Tatarczuk 7'

4 July 2026 Test 1	Poland	1–1 (2–4 p)	Austria	Poznań, Poland
17:00	Wochna 18'	Report	Kölbl 27'	Stadium: AWF
	Penalties
	Tatarczuk (penalty shoot-out scored); Wochna (penalty shoot-out scored); Katerla (penalty shoot-out missed); Arciszewska (penalty shoot-out missed)		(penalty shoot-out scored) Czech; (penalty shoot-out scored) Proksch; (penalty shoot-out scored) Kern; (penalty shoot-out scored) Felber

5 July 2026 Test 2	Poland	2–1	Austria	Poznań, Poland
11:00	Balcerzak 42'; Tatarczuk 49'	Report	Kern 32'	Stadium: AWF

==== 2027 Women's EuroHockey Championship Qualifiers ====
9 July 2026 Quarter-final	Austria	5–1	Turkey	Prague, Czech Republic
15:30	Proksch 36'; Pultar 41'; Hahnenkamp 43'; Haselsteiner 46'; Kern 56'	Report	Okumuş 17'

11 July 2026 Semi-final	Austria	1–0	Czech Republic	Prague, Czech Republic
15:15	Czech 11'	Report

12 July 2026 Final	Ukraine	2–3	Austria	Prague, Czech Republic
16:00	Korobkina 4'; Leonova 15'	Report	Buchleitner 13'; Czech 58'; Buchta 59'

== See also ==
- Austria men's national field hockey team
