= Poland women's national field hockey team =

Poland
- Association: Polski Związek Hokeja na Trawie (Poland Hockey Federation)
- Confederation: EHF (Europe)
- Head Coach: Norbert Nederlof
- Assistant coach(es): Dawid Zimnicki
- Manager: Mariusz Orzeł
- Captain: Marlena Rybacha

FIH ranking
- Current: 25 (11 June 2026)

Olympic Games
- Appearances: 1 (first in 1980)
- Best result: 6th (1980)

EuroHockey Championship
- Appearances: 1 (first in 2015)
- Best result: 8th (2015)

The Poland women's national field hockey team represents Poland in international women's field hockey. In its only appearance in the Olympic Games, at the 1980 Moscow Games, the team lost all five of its matches, failing to score a single goal.

== Tournament record ==
=== Summer Olympics ===
- 1980 – 6th place

=== Friendship Games ===
- 1984 – (silver)

=== EuroHockey Championship ===
- 2015 – 8th place

=== EuroHockey Championship II ===
- 2005 – 8th place
- 2009 – 7th place
- 2011 – 6th place
- 2013 – (silver)
- 2017 – 5th place
- 2019 – (bronze)
- 2021 – (bronze)
- 2023 – 5th place

=== EuroHockey Championship III ===
- 2007 – (silver)

=== Hockey World League ===
- 2014–15 – 18th place
- 2016–17 – 19th place

=== Hockey Nations Cup 2 ===
- 2024–25 – 4th place

=== FIH Hockey Series ===
- 2018–19 – Second round

== Results and fixtures ==
The following is a list of match results in the last 12 months, as well as any future matches that have been scheduled.

Win Draw Loss Fixture

=== 2026 ===
27 June 2026 Test 1	Austria	2–3	Poland	Wiener Neudorf, Austria
09:30	Bauer 20'; Hahnenkamp 59'	Report	Blaszyk 9', 43'; Wochna 57'

28 June 2026 Test 2	Austria	2–1	Poland	Wiener Neudorf, Austria
09:30	Pultar 29'; Haselsteiner 36'	Report	Tatarczuk 7'

4 July 2026 Test 1	Poland	1–1 (2–4 p)	Austria	Poznań, Poland
17:00	Wochna 18'	Report	Kölbl 27'	Stadium: AWF
	Penalties
	Tatarczuk (penalty shoot-out scored); Wochna (penalty shoot-out scored); Katerla (penalty shoot-out missed); Arciszewska (penalty shoot-out missed)		(penalty shoot-out scored) Czech; (penalty shoot-out scored) Proksch; (penalty shoot-out scored) Kern; (penalty shoot-out scored) Felber

5 July 2026 Test 2	Poland	2–1	Austria	Poznań, Poland
11:00	Balcerzak 42'; Tatarczuk 49'	Report	Kern 32'	Stadium: AWF

9 July 2026 EU Championship Qualifiers QF	Poland	3–0	Croatia	Prague, Czech Republic
13:15	Rymer 3'; Kucharska 34'; Zimmermann 35'	Report

11 July 2026 EU Championship Qualifiers SF	Ukraine	2–1	Poland	Prague, Czech Republic
13:00	Basanets 37'; Honcharenko 45'	Report	Wochna 35'

12 July 2026 EU Championship Qualifiers Third place match	Poland	1–0	Czech Republic	Prague, Czech Republic
13:45	Pabiniak 15'	Report

== See also ==
- Poland men's national field hockey team
