= Scotland women's national field hockey team =

Scotland
- Association: Scottish Hockey
- Confederation: EHF (Europe)
- Head Coach: Chris Duncan
- Assistant coach(es): Jimmy Culnane; Simon Lee; Keith Smith
- Manager: Becky Hague
- Captain: Sarah Robertson
Home	Away

FIH ranking
- Current: 14 (4 August 2026)

World Cup
- Appearances: 5 (first in 1983)
- Best result: 8th (1983)

EuroHockey Championship
- Appearances: 13 (first in 1984)
- Best result: 5th (1991)

The Scotland women's national field hockey team represents Scotland in international women's field hockey competitions, with the exception of the Olympic Games when Scottish players are eligible to play for the Great Britain women's national field hockey team as selected. Scotland recently participated in the inaugural season of the FIH Hockey World League, but were knocked out in round 2, failing to qualify for the 2014 Hockey World Cup in The Hague, Netherlands. As of November 2015 they are seventeenth in the FIH outdoor world rankings.

== Competing as Great Britain ==
Scotland do not compete at the Olympic Games, but Scottish players are eligible to play for Great Britain as selected. Great Britain instead of the four individual home nations (including Scotland) also compete at certain editions of both the FIH Hockey World League, usually when the tournament serves as an Olympic Games qualifier (most recently in 2014–15), and the FIH Hockey Champions Trophy, when held during Olympic years (most recently in 2016).

At the 1992 Olympic Games, Scottish field hockey players, Susan Fraser, Wendy Fraser and Alison Ramsay won bronze medals, as part of the Great Britain team in the women's tournament. Scottish players Laura Bartlett and Emily Maguire repeated the feat at the 2012 Olympic Games. Also with the Great Britain team, Maguire won silver at the 2012 FIH Hockey Champions Trophy (as did Bartlett), and a gold medal for winning the 2014–15 FIH Hockey World League Semi-finals.

== Tournament history ==
Champions Runners-up Third place Fourth place
An asterisk denotes draws include knockout matches decided on penalty shootouts.
A red box around the year indicates tournaments played within Scotland.

=== World Cup ===
World Cup record
Year	Round	Position	Pld	W	D*	L	GF	GA
(Malaysia) 1983	7th–8th Play–off	8th place	7	2	1	4	5	17
(Netherlands) 1986	9th–10th Play–off	10th place	7	2	0	5	7	14
(Netherlands) 1998	9th–10th Play–off	10th place	7	3	0	4	11	16
(Australia) 2002	11th–12th Play–off	12th place	9	2	0	7	8	27
(Belgium) / (Netherlands) 2026	11th–12th Play–off	12th place	6	2	0	4	7	12

=== World League ===
World League record
Year	Round	Position	Pld	W	D*	L	GF	GA
2012–13	Round 2	18th place	10	6	2	2	41	10
2016–17	Semifinals	18th place	11	5	1	5	10	17

=== Commonwealth Games ===
Commonwealth Games record
Year	Round	Position	Pld	W	D*	L	GF	GA
(Malaysia) 1998	Group stage	N/A	5	3	1	1	11	11
(England) 2002	5th–6th Play–off	6th place	5	1	0	4	11	17
(Australia) 2006	5th–6th Play–off	6th place	5	2	0	3	11	11
(India) 2010	7th–8th Play–off	7th place	5	1	2	2	11	10
(Scotland) 2014	5th–6th Play–off	6th place	5	2	0	3	6	13
(Australia) 2018	7th–8th Play–off	7th place	5	2	1	2	10	10
(England) 2022	5th–6th Play–off	6th place	5	2	0	3	16	8

=== EuroHockey Nations Championship ===
Euro Championship record
Year	Round	Position	Pld	W	D*	L	GF	GA
(France) 1984	5th–6th Play–off	6th place	7	4	0	3	8	9
(England) 1987	5th–6th Play–off	6th place	7	4	0	3	14	13
(Belgium) 1991	5th–6th Play–off	5th place	7	5	0	2	15	9
(Netherlands) 1995	5th–6th Play–off	6th place	7	3	2	2	19	7
(Germany) 1999	5th–6th Play–off	6th place	7	3	2	2	13	12
(Spain) 2003		7th place						
(Ireland) 2005		7th place						
2007 European Nations Challenge II – (gold)
(Netherlands) 2009	5th–8th Group	8th place	6	0	3	3	3	11
2011 European Nations Challenge II – (gold)
(Belgium) 2013	5th–8th Group	6th place	6	2	0	4	9	10
(England) 2015	5th–8th Group	6th place	6	3	0	3	10	7
(Netherlands) 2017	5th–8th Group	8th place	5	0	1	4	2	9
(Netherlands) 2021	5th–8th Group	7th place	5	1	0	4	5	19
(Germany) 2023	5th–8th Group	7th place	5	1	1	3	4	16
(Germany) 2025	5th–8th Group	5th place	5	2	1	2	6	11
(England) 2027	Qualified							

=== Champions Challenge I ===
Hockey Champions Challenge I
Year	Round	Position	Pld	W	D*	L	GF	GA
2002 to 2009 – Did not participate
(Ireland) 2011	3rd–4th Play–off	3rd place	6	2	3	1	11	11
(Ireland) 2012	3rd–4th Play–off	4th place	6	1	2	1	5	6
(Scotland) 2014	7th–8th Play–off	7th place	6	2	1	3	14	12

=== Hockey World Cup Qualifier ===
Hockey Champions Challenge I
Year	Round	Position	Pld	W	D*	L	GF	GA
(Netherlands) 1997	3rd–4th Play-off	3rd place	7	3	2	2	16	5
(France) 2001	5th–6th Play–off	6th place	8	4	1	3	14	11
(Italy) 2006	9th–10th Play–off	10th place	7	1	0	6	11	20
(Chile) 2010	Pool Stage	2nd place	4	3	0	1	9	2

=== EuroHockey Nations Indoor Championship ===
- 1998 – 4th place
- 2000 – 4th place
- 2002 – 8th place
- 2006 – 4th place
- 2008 – 4th place
- 2010 – 7th place
- 2012 Challenge II – 5th place
- 2014 Challenge II – 3rd place

== Results and fixtures ==
The following is a list of match results in the last 12 months, as well as any future matches that have been scheduled.

Win Draw Loss Fixture

=== 2026 ===
==== 2026 Women's FIH World Cup Qualifiers ====
8 March 2026 Pool B	Scotland	1–0	Wales	Hyderabad, India
17:15	Costello 20'	Report		Stadium: G. M. C. Balayogi Hockey Ground

9 March 2026 Pool B	Scotland	2–2	India	Hyderabad, India
19:30	McEwan 6'; Fiona 33'	Report	Kaur 18'; Toppo 29'	Stadium: G. M. C. Balayogi Hockey Ground

11 March 2026 Pool B	Uruguay	1–3	Scotland	Hyderabad, India
17:15	Verga 19'	Report	Eadie 10'; Holdgate 43', 58'	Stadium: G. M. C. Balayogi Hockey Ground

13 March 2026 Semi Final	England	2–0	Scotland	Hyderabad, India
17:15	Bingham 25'; Bourne 29'	Report		Stadium: G. M. C. Balayogi Hockey Ground

14 March 2026 3/4 Classification	Scotland	1–0	Italy	Hyderabad, India
17:15	Costello 7'	Report		Stadium: G. M. C. Balayogi Hockey Ground

==== India U21 Series ====
5 July 2026 Match 1	Scotland	3–2	India U21	Edinburgh, Scotland
13:30		Report		Stadium: Peffermill Playing Fields, The University of Edinburgh

6 July 2026 Match 2	Scotland	3–1	India U21	Edinburgh, Scotland
19:00		Report		Stadium: Peffermill Playing Fields, The University of Edinburgh

==== Malaysia Test series ====
18 July 2026 Test 1	Scotland	6–2	Malaysia	Edinburgh, Scotland
16:00	Watson 10'; Burnet 14'; Mackenzie 23', 28'; Kennedy 24'; Costello 58'	Report	Zulkifli 40'; Mohd 60'	Stadium: Peffermill Playing Fields, The University of Edinburgh

19 July 2026 Test 2	Scotland	6–0	Malaysia	Edinburgh, Scotland
14:00	Costello 13', 29'; Wadsworth 45'; Low 48'; McEwan 53'; Birch 56'	Report		Stadium: Peffermill Playing Fields, The University of Edinburgh

==== Friendly match ====
29 July 2026 Friendly match	Belgium	1–2	Scotland

==== South Africa Test series ====
2 August 2026 Test 1	Scotland	2–0	South Africa	Edinburgh, Scotland
15:00	McEwan 17'; Costello 57'	Report		Stadium: Peffermill Playing Fields, The University of Edinburgh

3 August 2026 Test 2	Scotland	2–3	South Africa	Edinburgh, Scotland
19:30	Watson 10'; Eadie 30'	Report	Mokoena 16', 54'; Mali 59'	Stadium: Peffermill Playing Fields, The University of Edinburgh

==== 2026 Women's FIH Hockey World Cup ====
15 August 2026 Pool B	Germany	3–0	Scotland	Wavre, Belgium
11:30	Zhong 19'; Hachenberg 24'; Krings 59'	Report		Stadium: Belfius Hockey Arena

17 August 2026 Pool B	United States	3–2	Scotland	Wavre, Belgium
11:00	D'Ariano 4'; Gladieux 24'; Schoenbeck 39'	Report	Robertson 10'; Steiger 40'	Stadium: Belfius Hockey Arena

19 August 2026 Pool B	Argentina	2–0	Scotland	Wavre, Belgium
11:00	Granatto 11'; Casas 41'	Report		Stadium: Belfius Hockey Arena

22 August 2026 Pool H	Ireland	1–2	Scotland	Wavre, Belgium
11:30	Kealy 26'	Report	Mackenzie 6'; Watson 34'	Stadium: Belfius Hockey Arena

24 August 2026 Pool H	New Zealand	1–2	Scotland	Wavre, Belgium
11:00	Wang 23'	Report	Burnet 26'; McEwan 45'	Stadium: Belfius Hockey Arena

27 August 2026 11th place match	Japan	2–1	Scotland	Amstelveen, Netherlands
12:30	Suzuki 11'; Nakagomi 50'	Report	Mackenzie 58'	Stadium: Wagener Stadium

== Players ==
=== Current squad ===
The squad for the 2026 Women's FIH Hockey World Cup.

Head coach: Chris Duncan

1. Jennifer Eadie
4. Eve Pearson
8. Amy Costello
10. Sarah Robertson (C)
11. Katherine Birch
12. Charlotte Watson
13. Ruth Blaikie
15. Heather McEwan
17. Sarah Jamieson
18. Millie Steiger
20. Bronwyn Shields
21. Jessica Martin
22. Emily Overend (GK)
23. Jessica Buchanan (GK)
25. Rebecca Birch
27. Fiona Burnet
30. Katherine Holdgate
31. Zara Kennedy
35. Ellie Mackenzie
37. Ava Findlay

=== Notable former players ===
- Laura Bartlett
- Susan Fraser
- Wendy Fraser
- Alison Ramsay
- Pauline Robertson
- Rhona Simpson

== See also ==
- Scotland men's national field hockey team
