= 2025–26 Women's FIH Pro League =

- Dates: 9 December 2025 – 28 June 2026
- Teams: 9 (from 4 confederations)

Final positions
- Champions: Netherlands (6th title)
- Runner-up: Argentina
- Third place: Belgium

Tournament statistics
- Matches played: 72
- Goals scored: 245 (3.4 per match)
- Top scorer: (Netherlands) Yibbi Jansen (15 goals)
All statistics are correct as of 28 June 2026


The 2025–26 Women's FIH Pro League was the seventh edition of the Women's FIH Pro League, a field hockey championship for women's national teams. The tournament began on 9 December 2025 and finished on 28 June 2026.

The Netherlands won their fifth tile.

== Format ==
The home and away principle was kept for the season, which was divided into date blocks. To assist with competition planning, international and national, several teams gathered in one venue to contest “mini-tournaments," wherein they each played two matches against one another.

If one of the two matches played between two teams was cancelled, the winner of the other match received double points.

This season winner earned direct qualification for the 2028 Summer Olympics.

== Teams ==
Following their win of the 2024–25 FIH Nations Cup, the promoted team New Zealand replaced the relegated team of the last season of the 2024–25 FIH Pro League, India. On 30 June 2025, New Zealand withdrew and Ireland joined despite finishing second in the 2024–25 Women's FIH Hockey Nations Cup.

- Argentina
- Australia
- Belgium
- China
- England
- Germany
- Ireland
- Netherlands
- ~~New Zealand~~
- Spain

== Venues and stages ==
Following is a list of all venues and host cities across the world. Tournament hosts in parentheses.

December	February	June
Belgium; England; Ireland (host)	Belgium; Germany; Spain (host)	Ireland; Netherlands (host); Spain
Argentina (host); Germany; Netherlands	China (host); England; Netherlands	Argentina; Australia; Belgium (host); China; Netherlands
	Argentina; Australia (host); China; Ireland; Spain	Argentina; Australia; England (host); Germany; Spain
		China; Germany (host); Ireland

== Results ==
=== Standings ===
Pos	Team	Pld	W	SOW	SOL	L	GF	GA	GD	Pts	Qualification or relegation
1st place, gold medalist(s)	Netherlands (Note: The Argentina versus Netherlands second match was cancelled and counted as win for Netherlands.) (C)	15	14	0	1	0	56	7	+49	46	Qualified for the 2028 Summer Olympics
2nd place, silver medalist(s)	Argentina	15	8	3	1	3	30	19	+11	31	
3rd place, bronze medalist(s)	Belgium	16	9	1	1	5	31	23	+8	30	
4	China	16	7	1	1	7	25	37	−12	24	
5	Germany	16	7	0	2	7	27	24	+3	23	
6	Spain	16	5	3	1	7	25	31	−6	22	
7	England	16	4	1	2	9	19	31	−12	16	
8	Australia	16	2	3	2	9	17	37	−20	14	
9	Ireland (R)	16	2	1	2	11	15	36	−21	10	Relegated to 2026–27 FIH Nations Cup

Source: FIH
Rules for classification: 1) points; 2) matches won; 3) goal difference; 4) goals for; 5) head-to-head result; 6) field goals scored.
(C) Champion; (R) Relegated

=== Fixtures ===
9 December 2025
14:00

England	0–3	Belgium
	Report	S. Vanden Borre 7', 38'; Englebert 58'

Sport Ireland Campus, Dublin
Umpires:
Gemma Calderón (ESP)
Lizelotte Wolter (NED)

9 December 2025
21:30

Germany	0–2	Netherlands
	Report	Y. Jansen 4'; Burg 24'

Polideportivo Provincial, Santiago del Estero
Umpires:
Ivona Makar (CRO)
Kamilė Mockaitytė (LTU)

10 December 2025
14:00

Ireland	1–2	Belgium
Curran 60+'	Report	Ballenghien 23', 34'

Sport Ireland Campus, Dublin
Umpires:
Sandra Adell (ESP)
Łukasz Zwierzchowski (POL)

10 December 2025
21:30

Argentina	1–0	Germany
Gorzelany 13'	Report

Polideportivo Provincial, Santiago del Estero
Umpires:
Jonathan Altamirano (MEX)
Kamilė Mockaitytė (LTU)

11 December 2025
14:00

Ireland	1–1	England
Torrans 26'	Report	Rayer 36'
Penalties
Beggs (penalty shoot-out scored); McMaster (penalty shoot-out missed); Power (penalty shoot-out scored); McLoughlin (penalty shoot-out scored); Hawkshaw (penalty shoot-out missed); McLoughlin (penalty shoot-out scored)	4–3	(penalty shoot-out missed) S. Hamilton; (penalty shoot-out scored) Bourne; (penalty shoot-out scored) Rayer; (penalty shoot-out scored) Owsley; (penalty shoot-out missed) Howard; (penalty shoot-out missed) S. Hamilton

Sport Ireland Campus, Dublin
Umpires:
Sandra Adell (ESP)
You Hyo-sik (KOR)

11 December 2025
21:30

Argentina	0–4	Netherlands
	Report	Matla 15', 18'; F. Moes 33'; P. Dicke 43'

Polideportivo Provincial, Santiago del Estero
Umpires:
Ivona Makar (CRO)
Jonathan von Hoesslin (RSA)

12 December 2025
14:00

Belgium	2–1	England
Englebert 42'; S. Vanden Borre 59'	Report	Bourne 14'

Sport Ireland Campus, Dublin
Umpires:
Gemma Calderón (ESP)
Lizelotte Wolter (NED)

12 December 2025
21:30

Netherlands	5–1	Germany
Van der Elst 20'; Y. Jansen 41', 60'; Fokke 47'; Albers 48'	Report	Nolte 48'

Polideportivo Provincial, Santiago del Estero
Umpires:
Ivona Makar (CRO)
Kamilė Mockaitytė (LTU)

13 December 2025
14:00

Ireland	1–2	Belgium
Torrans 41'	Report	Englebert 4'; Gerniers 10'

Sport Ireland Campus, Dublin
Umpires:
Lizelotte Wolter (NED)
Łukasz Zwierzchowski (POL)

13 December 2025
21:30

Argentina	1–1	Germany
V. Granatto 2'	Report	Micheel 38'
Penalties
Jankunas (penalty shoot-out missed); Bruggesser (penalty shoot-out missed); V. Granatto (penalty shoot-out scored); Cairó (penalty shoot-out scored); Esandi (penalty shoot-out scored); Cairó (penalty shoot-out scored); V. Granatto (penalty shoot-out scored)	5–4	(penalty shoot-out scored) Zimmermann; (penalty shoot-out scored) Zhong; (penalty shoot-out missed) Wiedermann; (penalty shoot-out scored) Micheel; (penalty shoot-out missed) Nolte; (penalty shoot-out scored) Zimmermann; (penalty shoot-out missed) Zhong

Polideportivo Provincial, Santiago del Estero
Umpires:
Jonathan Altamirano (MEX)
Michael Dutrieux (BEL)

14 December 2025
14:00

Ireland	1–2	England
Perdue 53'	Report	Howard 4'; Hunt 50'

Sport Ireland Campus, Dublin
Umpires:
Sandra Adell (ESP)
Gemma Calderón (ESP)

14 December 2025
21:30

Argentina	Cancelled	Netherlands
	Report

Polideportivo Provincial, Santiago del Estero
Umpires:
Sean Rapaport (RSA)
Ivona Makar (CRO)

The match was cancelled due to severe weather conditions.

5 February 2026
13:30

Spain	3–5	Belgium
F. Amundson 25'; Agulló 56'; Álvarez 59'	Report	Van Remortel 16', 35'; Dewaet 17'; Belis 38'; D. Marien 55'

Estadio Beteró, Valencia
Umpires:
Allison Mikelson (USA)
Sarah Wilson (SCO)

5 February 2026
19:30

China	0–3	Netherlands
	Report	Matla 26', 41'; Jansen 57'

Yunfu Education Park Hockey Field, Yunfu
Umpires:
Kelly Hudosn (NZL)
Deepak Joshi (IND)

6 February 2026
13:30

Germany	1–3	Belgium
Haid 20'	Report	D. Marien 4'; Dewaet 34', 49'

Estadio Beteró, Valencia
Umpires:
Alex Miles (CAN)
Victoria Pazos (PAR)

6 February 2026
19:30

England	0–3	Netherlands
	Report	Jansen 3', 28'; Matla 9'

Yunfu Education Park Hockey Field, Yunfu
Umpires:
Hideki Kinoshita (JPN)
Ana Ortega (ESP)

7 February 2026
13:30

Spain	1–1	Germany
Bosch 50'	Report	Krings 24'
Penalties
P. Jiménez (penalty shoot-out scored); Vidosa (penalty shoot-out scored); Segú (penalty shoot-out scored); L. Jiménez (penalty shoot-out scored)	4–2	(penalty shoot-out scored) Haid; (penalty shoot-out missed) Frerichs; (penalty shoot-out scored) Zhong; (penalty shoot-out missed) Strauss

Estadio Beteró, Valencia
Umpires:
Ahmed El-Sayed (EGY)
Wanri Venter (RSA)

7 February 2026
17:00

China	3–2	England
Ma 53'; Hao 53'; Fan 57'	Report	Howard 34', 44'

Yunfu Education Park Hockey Field, Yunfu
Umpires:
Kelly Hudosn (NZL)
Hideki Kinoshita (JPN)

8 February 2026
13:30

Spain	1–0	Belgium
Rogoski 27'	Report

Estadio Beteró, Valencia
Umpires:
Allison Mikelson (USA)
Victoria Pazos (PAR)

8 February 2026
17:00

China	1–6	Netherlands
Feng 58'	Report	Albers 8', 56'; Matla 13'; Veen 35', 52'; Y. Jansen 47'

Yunfu Education Park Hockey Field, Yunfu
Umpires:
Deepak Joshi (IND)
Ana Ortega (ESP)

9 February 2026
13:30

Belgium	1–0	Germany
D. Marien 51'	Report

Estadio Beteró, Valencia
Umpires:
Ahmed El-Sayed (EGY)
Alex Miles (CAN)

9 February 2026
19:30

Netherlands	3–1	England
Burg 27'; Y. Jansen 33'; P. Dicke 60'	Report	Bourne 13'

Yunfu Education Park Hockey Field, Yunfu
Umpires:
Deepak Joshi (IND)
Hideki Kinoshita (JPN)

10 February 2026
11:00

Spain	3–1	Germany
Álvarez 37', 42', 54'	Report	Fleschütz 23'

Estadio Beteró, Valencia
Umpires:
Victoria Pazos (PAR)
Allison Mikelson (USA)

10 February 2026
19:30

Ireland	0–5	Argentina
	Report	Gorzelany 16'; Bruggesser 19'; Jankunas 35'; M. Granatto 45'; Casas 55'

Tasmanian Hockey Centre, Hobart
Umpires:
Katrina Turner (NZL)
Magali Sergeant (BEL)

10 February 2026
19:30

China	0–2	England
	Report	Balsdon 8'; Howard 51'

Yunfu Education Park Hockey Field, Yunfu
Umpires:
Kelly Hudosn (NZL)
Ana Ortega (ESP)

11 February 2026
17:00

Australia	0–1	Argentina
	Report	Gorzelany 39'

Tasmanian Hockey Centre, Hobart
Umpires:
Rama Potnis (IND)
Magali Sergeant (BEL)

12 February 2026
19:30

Australia	0–0	Ireland
	Report
Penalties
Downes (penalty shoot-out scored); Williams (penalty shoot-out scored); Arnott (penalty shoot-out scored); G. Stewart (penalty shoot-out missed); Nobbs (penalty shoot-out scored)	4–2	(penalty shoot-out missed) Beggs; (penalty shoot-out missed) Power; (penalty shoot-out scored) McLoughlin; (penalty shoot-out scored) McMaster

Tasmanian Hockey Centre, Hobart
Umpires:
Rama Potnis (IND)
Katrina Turner (NZL)

13 February 2026
19:30

Argentina	2–1	Ireland
M. Granatto 15'; Gorzelany 37'	Report	McAuley 3'

Tasmanian Hockey Centre, Hobart
Umpires:
Magali Sergeant (BEL)
Rama Potnis (IND)

14 February 2026
18:30

Australia	0–3	Argentina
	Report	Díaz 17'; Trinchinetti 44'; Gorzelany 48'

Tasmanian Hockey Centre, Hobart
Umpires:
Katrina Turner (NZL)
Magali Sergeant (BEL)

15 February 2026
18:30

Australia	1–4	Ireland
Downes 3'	Report	Curran 17'; Mullan 27'; Hawkshaw 34'; McLoughlin 56'

Tasmanian Hockey Centre, Hobart
Umpires:
Rama Potnis (IND)
Katrina Turner (NZL)

20 February 2026
19:30

Australia	1–4	Spain
Howell 10'	Report	L. Jiménez 6'; Rogoski 25'; Bosch 29'; Segú 53'

Tasmanian Hockey Centre, Hobart
Umpires:
Junko Wagatsuma (JPN)
Rebecca Edwards (ENG)

21 February 2026
19:30

China	3–0	Spain
Ma 3', 15'; Yu 21'	Report

Tasmanian Hockey Centre, Hobart
Umpires:
Sophie Bockelmann (GER)
Lani Nichol (NZL)

22 February 2026
18:30

Australia	1–3	China
Cullum-Sanders 48'	Report	Wang 11'; Zeng 23'; Zhang Y. 27'

Tasmanian Hockey Centre, Hobart
Umpires:
Rebecca Edwards (ENG)
Lani Nichol (NZL)

23 February 2026
18:30

Australia	2–2	Spain
West 13'; Pickering 33'	Report	Mejías 48'; Giné 59'
Penalties
Greiner (penalty shoot-out missed); Downes (penalty shoot-out scored); Cullum-Sanders (penalty shoot-out missed); Ward (penalty shoot-out missed); Schonell (penalty shoot-out missed)	1–2	(penalty shoot-out scored) P. Jiménez; (penalty shoot-out missed) Vidosa; (penalty shoot-out scored) Badia; (penalty shoot-out missed) L. Jiménez

Tasmanian Hockey Centre, Hobart
Umpires:
Junko Wagatsuma (JPN)
Rebecca Edwards (ENG)

24 February 2026
18:30

Spain	2–2	China
Mejías 4'; Álvarez 40'	Report	Zhang Y. 21', 32'
Penalties
P. Jiménez (penalty shoot-out scored); Vidosa (penalty shoot-out scored); Agulló (penalty shoot-out scored); L. Jiménez (penalty shoot-out missed); Álvarez (penalty shoot-out missed)	3–4	(penalty shoot-out scored) Li H. (penalty shoot-out missed) Fan; (penalty shoot-out scored) Liu C. (penalty shoot-out scored) Dan; (penalty shoot-out scored) Zhong

Tasmanian Hockey Centre, Hobart
Umpires:
Sophie Bockelmann (GER)
Junko Wagatsuma (JPN)

25 February 2026
18:30

Australia	1–3	China
Sharman 40'	Report	Zhong 14'; Zou 17'; Zeng 44'

Tasmanian Hockey Centre, Hobart
Umpires:
Junko Wagatsuma (JPN)
Rebecca Edwards (ENG)

13 June 2026
13:00

China	1–4	Argentina
Liu C. 1'	Report	V. Granatto 30'; Pisthón 38'; Gorzelany 46'; Alastra 49'

Stade Justin Peeters, Wavre
Umpires:
Lizelotte Wolter (NED)
Daniël Veerman (NED)

13 June 2026
13:30

Netherlands	7–0	Ireland
De Waard 2'; Fokke 4', 39'; P. Dicke 9', 37'; Y. Jansen 23'; Sanders 51'	Report

Hazelaarweg Stadion, Rotterdam
Umpires:
Juan Pedro Rodríguez (ARG)
Tamara Leonard (AUS)

13 June 2026
15:00

England	1–2	Germany
Howard 59'	Report	Fleschütz 26'; Hachenberg 34'

Lee Valley Hockey and Tennis Centre, London
Umpires:
Alison Keogh (IRL)
Lorijn de Kraker (NED)

14 June 2026
13:00

Belgium	2–2	Argentina
D. Marien 34'; S. Vanden Borre 47'	Report	Bruggesser 5'; Díaz 33'
Penalties
Van Heel (penalty shoot-out scored); Puvrez (penalty shoot-out missed); Englebert (penalty shoot-out missed); Rasir (penalty shoot-out missed); Struijk (penalty shoot-out missed)	1–2	(penalty shoot-out scored) V. Granatto; (penalty shoot-out missed) Bruggesser; (penalty shoot-out missed) Cairó; (penalty shoot-out scored) Jankunas

Stade Justin Peeters, Wavre
Umpires:
Maggie Giddens (USA)
Sean Edwards (ENG)

14 June 2026
13:30

Netherlands	4–0	Ireland
Y. Jansen 3'; Matla 8'; Burg 29'; Albers 37'	Report

Hazelaarweg Stadion, Rotterdam
Umpires:
Aleisha Neumann (AUS)
Jayden Pearson (AUS)

14 June 2026
15:00

England	0–3	Germany
	Report	Wiedermann 13'; Heusgen 45'; Hachenberg 48'

Lee Valley Hockey and Tennis Centre, London
Umpires:
Lisette Baljon (NED)
Ayden Shrives (RSA)

16 June 2026
18:30

Belgium	5–0	China
Bonami 7', 39'; D. Marien 36'; Englebert 46'; Van Heel 55'	Report

Stade Justin Peeters, Wavre
Umpires:
Lizelotte Wolter (NED)
Maggie Giddens (USA)

17 June 2026
17:00

Spain	1–1	Ireland
Mejías 9'	Report	McLoughlin 15'
Penalties
P. Jiménez (penalty shoot-out scored); Teresa (penalty shoot-out scored); Vidosa (penalty shoot-out scored)	3–0	(penalty shoot-out missed) Hawkshaw; (penalty shoot-out missed) McLoughlin; (penalty shoot-out missed) Power

Hazelaarweg Stadion, Rotterdam
Umpires:
Rawi Anbananthan (MAS)
Juan Pedro Rodríguez (ARG)

17 June 2026
19:30

Germany	0–2	Australia
	Report	Kershaw 20'; Arnott 26'

Lee Valley Hockey and Tennis Centre, London
Umpires:
Ivona Makar (CRO)
Lorijn de Kraker (NED)

18 June 2026
17:00

Ireland	3–1	Spain
Kealy 29'; N. Carey 37'; McAuley 40'	Report	L. Jiménez 55'

Hazelaarweg Stadion, Rotterdam
Umpires:
Jayden Pearson (AUS)
Dan Barstow (ENG)

18 June 2026
18:30

Belgium	0–1	China
	Report	Zhang Y. 10'

Stade Justin Peeters, Wavre
Umpires:
Sean Edwards (ENG)
Daniël Veerman (NED)

18 June 2026
19:30

Australia	1–5	Germany
Downes 20'	Report	Fleschütz 8'; Hachenberg 10'; Wiedermann 12'; Nolte 40', 45'

Lee Valley Hockey and Tennis Centre, London
Umpires:
Alison Keogh (IRL)
Lisette Baljon (NED)

20 June 2026
13:00

Netherlands	4–2	Spain
Veen 7'; Moes 9'; P. Dicke 33'; Y. Jansen 49'	Report	Lima 37'; Giné 60'

Hazelaarweg Stadion, Rotterdam
Umpires:
Tamara Leonard (AUS)
Rawi Anbananthan (MAS)

20 June 2026
13:00

Belgium	2–3	Argentina
Van Heel 51'; Englebert 57'	Report	Jankunas 3'; Gorzelany 45', 60'

Stade Justin Peeters, Wavre
Umpires:
Lizelotte Wolter (NED)
Ben Grant (NZL)

20 June 2026
15:00

England	0–3	Australia
	Report	Colwill 9', 27'; Arnott 17'

Lee Valley Hockey and Tennis Centre, London
Umpires:
Lisette Baljon (NED)
Ivona Makar (CRO)

21 June 2026
11:30

Netherlands	1–0	Spain
Albers 54'	Report

Hazelaarweg Stadion, Rotterdam
Umpires:
Aleisha Neumann (AUS)
Dan Barstow (ENG)

21 June 2026
11:30

Argentina	3–3	China
Gorzelany 6'; Miranda 30+'; Pisthón 38'	Report	Zhang Y. 11', 51'; Chen Ya. 21'
Penalties
V. Granatto (penalty shoot-out scored); Cairó (penalty shoot-out scored); Jankunas (penalty shoot-out scored); Casas (penalty shoot-out missed); Díaz (penalty shoot-out scored)	4–3	(penalty shoot-out scored) Li H. (penalty shoot-out scored) Fan; (penalty shoot-out missed) Liu C. (penalty shoot-out scored) Dan; (penalty shoot-out missed) Zhang Y.

Stade Justin Peeters, Wavre
Umpires:
Ben Grant (NZL)
Maggie Giddens (USA)

21 June 2026
14:00

England	2–2	Australia
Toman 2', 3'	Report	Kershaw 26', 32'
Penalties
Bourne (penalty shoot-out missed); Rayer (penalty shoot-out scored); Crackles (penalty shoot-out scored); S. Hamilton (penalty shoot-out missed); Owsley (penalty shoot-out missed); Bourne (penalty shoot-out scored); Rayer (penalty shoot-out missed); Crackles (penalty shoot-out missed); S. Hamilton (penalty shoot-out missed)	3–4	(penalty shoot-out scored) Kershaw; (penalty shoot-out missed) Williams; (penalty shoot-out missed) Lawton; (penalty shoot-out scored) Nobbs; (penalty shoot-out missed) G. Stewart; (penalty shoot-out scored) Nobbs; (penalty shoot-out missed) Kershaw; (penalty shoot-out missed) Williams; (penalty shoot-out scored) Lawton

Lee Valley Hockey and Tennis Centre, London
Umpires:
Lorijn de Kraker (NED)
Paul van den Assum (NED)

23 June 2026
12:00

Spain	2–1	Argentina
Molina 41'; F. Amundson 50'	Report	Alonso 15'

Lee Valley Hockey and Tennis Centre, London
Umpires:
Junko Wagatsuma (JPN)
Magali Sergeant (BEL)

23 June 2026
20:30

Germany	2–0	Ireland
Krings 51'; Strauss 59'	Report

Ernst-Reuter Sportfeld, Berlin
Umpires:
Kim Yoon-seon (KOR)
Steven Bakker (NED)

23 June 2026
20:30

Belgium	1–1	Australia
S. Vanden Borre 1'	Report	Arnott 19'
Penalties
Verhees (penalty shoot-out scored); De Clerck (penalty shoot-out scored); D. Marien (penalty shoot-out scored); S. Vanden Borre (penalty shoot-out scored)	4–2	(penalty shoot-out scored) Arnott; (penalty shoot-out missed) Downes; (penalty shoot-out scored) Nobbs; (penalty shoot-out missed) Lawton

Stade Justin Peeters, Wavre
Umpires:
Cookie Tan (SGP)
Hannah Harrison (ENG)

24 June 2026
11:00

England	0–1	Spain
	Report	F. Amundson 27'

Lee Valley Hockey and Tennis Centre, London
Umpires:
Magali Sergeant (BEL)
Sophie Bockelmann (GER)

24 June 2026
17:30

China	2–1	Ireland
Yang L. 25'; Zhong 58'	Report	Hawkshaw 1'

Ernst-Reuter Sportfeld, Berlin
Umpires:
Kim Yoon-seon (KOR)
Timothy Sheahan (AUS)

24 June 2026
18:30

Australia	0–6	Netherlands
	Report	G. Moes 5'; P. Dicke 13', 33'; Matla 17'; Y. Jansen 30'; Post 54'

Stade Justin Peeters, Wavre
Umpires:
Rachel Williams (ENG)
Hannah Harrison (ENG)

25 June 2026
17:00

England	0–0	Argentina
	Report
Penalties
Crackles (penalty shoot-out scored); Bourne (penalty shoot-out scored); Bingham (penalty shoot-out missed); Curtis (penalty shoot-out scored); Howard (penalty shoot-out scored)	4–2	(penalty shoot-out scored) Bruggesser; (penalty shoot-out missed) Miranda; (penalty shoot-out missed) V. Granatto; (penalty shoot-out scored) Cairó

Lee Valley Hockey and Tennis Centre, London
Umpires:
Sophie Bockelmann (GER)
Junko Wagatsuma (JPN)

25 June 2026
17:30

Germany	2–1	China
Schwabe 12'; Wiedermann 44'	Report	Yu 50'

Ernst-Reuter Sportfeld, Berlin
Umpires:
Laurine Delforge (BEL)
Jonathan von Hoesslin (RSA)

25 June 2026
18:30

Belgium	1–4	Netherlands
S. Vanden Borre 58'	Report	Y. Jansen 20'; P. Dicke 39', 46'; F. Moes 51'

Stade Justin Peeters, Wavre
Umpires:
Cookie Tan (SGP)
Rachel Williams (ENG)

26 June 2026
15:30

Argentina	2–0	Spain
Trinchinetti 46'; Bruggesser 60'	Report

Lee Valley Hockey and Tennis Centre, London
Umpires:
Lim Hong-Zhen (SGP)
Junko Wagatsuma (JPN)

26 June 2026
18:30

Belgium	2–1	Australia
Englebert 10'; Belis 59'	Report	G. Stewart 22'

Stade Justin Peeters, Wavre
Umpires:
Hannah Harrison (ENG)
Cookie Tan (SGP)

26 June 2026
20:30

Germany	3–1	Ireland
Stoffelsma 9'; Micheel 55'; Krings 60'	Report	Torrans 55'

Ernst-Reuter Sportfeld, Berlin
Umpires:
Kim Yoon-seon (KOR)
Laurine Delforge (BEL)

27 June 2026
13:30

England	4–2	Spain
Howard 10'; O. Hamilton 22'; Owsley 51'; Bourne 59'	Report	Molina 11'; F. Amundson 52'

Lee Valley Hockey and Tennis Centre, London
Umpires:
Junko Wagatsuma (JPN)
Sarah Wilson (SCO)

27 June 2026
16:30

Ireland	0–1	China
	Report	Zhang Y. 7'

Ernst-Reuter Sportfeld, Berlin
Umpires:
Steven Bakker (NED)
Jonathan von Hoesslin (RSA)

27 June 2026
18:00

Netherlands	1–1	Australia
Matla 26'	Report	Colwill 60'
Penalties
Sanders (penalty shoot-out missed); Matla (penalty shoot-out missed); F. Moes (penalty shoot-out scored); Van der Elst (penalty shoot-out missed)	1–3	(penalty shoot-out scored) Kershaw; (penalty shoot-out missed) Williams; (penalty shoot-out scored) Downes; (penalty shoot-out scored) Nobbs

Stade Justin Peeters, Wavre
Umpires:
Darren Hubach (RSA)
Cookie Tan (SGP)

28 June 2026
13:30

England	3–2	Argentina
Toman 11'; Rayer 16'; Hunt 33'	Report	Trinchinetti 5'; Gorzelany 45+'

Lee Valley Hockey and Tennis Centre, London
Umpires:
Magali Sergeant (BEL)
Sophie Bockelmann (GER)

28 June 2026
15:30

Germany	5–1	China
Stoffelsma 46'; Fleschütz 47'; Schwabe 57'; Strauss 58'; Zimmermann 60'	Report	Tan 59'

Ernst-Reuter Sportfeld, Berlin
Umpires:
Kim Yoon-seon (KOR)
Jonathan von Hoesslin (RSA)

28 June 2026
18:00

Belgium	0–3	Netherlands
	Report	Burg 34'; Jansen 54', 57'

Stade Justin Peeters, Wavre
Umpires:
Gareth Greenfield (NZL)
Rachel Williams (ENG)

== Goalscorers ==
There were 245 goals scored in 72 matches, for an average of 3.4 goals per match.

15 goals

- (Netherlands) Yibbi Jansen

10 goals

- (Argentina) Agustina Gorzelany

9 goals

- (Netherlands) Pien Dicke
- (Netherlands) Frédérique Matla

7 goals

- (China) Zhang Ying

6 goals

- (Belgium) Stéphanie Vanden Borre
- (Belgium) Charlotte Englebert
- (England) Tess Howard

5 goals

- (Belgium) Delphine Marien
- (Spain) Patricia Álvarez

4 goals

- (Germany) Jette Fleschütz
- (Netherlands) Felice Albers
- (Netherlands) Joosje Burg
- (Netherlands) Marijn Veen
- (Spain) Florencia Amundson

3 goals

- (Argentina) Brisa Bruggesser
- (Argentina) Eugenia Trinchinetti
- (Australia) Claire Colwill
- (Australia) Stephanie Kershaw
- (Australia) Alice Arnott
- (Belgium) Louise Dewaet
- (China) Ma Ning
- (England) Darcy Bourne
- (England) Anna Toman
- (Germany) Johanna Hachenberg
- (Germany) Lynn Krings
- (Germany) Lisa Nolte
- (Germany) Felicia Wiedermann
- (Ireland) Sarah Torrans
- (Netherlands) Luna Fokke
- (Netherlands) Freeke Moes
- (Spain) Candela Mejías

2 goals

- (Argentina) Zoe Díaz
- (Argentina) María José Granatto
- (Argentina) Victoria Granatto
- (Argentina) Julieta Jankunas
- (Argentina) Lourdes Pisthón
- (Australia) Olivia Downes
- (Belgium) Ambre Ballenghien
- (Belgium) Camille Belis
- (Belgium) Astrid Bonami
- (Belgium) Famke Van Heel
- (Belgium) Alexi Van Remortel
- (China) Yu Anhui
- (China) Zeng Xueling
- (China) Zhong Jiaqi
- (England) Holly Hunt
- (England) Ellie Rayer
- (Germany) Lena Micheel
- (Germany) Sophia Schwabe
- (Germany) Lilly Stoffelsma
- (Germany) Sara Strauss
- (Ireland) Ellen Curran
- (Ireland) Sarah Hawkshaw
- (Ireland) Sarah McAuley
- (Ireland) Hannah McLoughlin
- (Spain) Laura Bosch
- (Spain) Xantal Giné
- (Spain) Lucía Jiménez
- (Spain) Luciana Molina
- (Spain) Sofía Rogoski

1 goal

- (Argentina) Milagros Alastra
- (Argentina) Agostina Alonso
- (Argentina) Lara Casas
- (Argentina) Victoria Miranda
- (Australia) Hannah Cullum-Sanders
- (Australia) Mihaylia Howell
- (Australia) Lexie Pickering
- (Australia) Lucy Sharman
- (Australia) Grace Stewart
- (Australia) Georgina West
- (Belgium) Alix Gerniers
- (China) Chen Yang
- (China) Fan Yunxia
- (China) Feng Qingmiao
- (China) Hao Guoting
- (China) Liu Chencheng
- (China) Tan Jinzhuang
- (China) Wang Lihang
- (China) Yang Liu
- (China) Zou Meirong
- (England) Grace Balsdon
- (England) Olivia Hamilton
- (England) Lily Owsley
- (Germany) Katharina Haid
- (Germany) Friederike Heusgen
- (Germany) Sonja Zimmermann
- (Ireland) Niamh Carey
- (Ireland) Emily Kealy
- (Ireland) Katie Mullan
- (Ireland) Caoimhe Perdue
- (Netherlands) Fay van der Elst
- (Netherlands) Guusje Moes
- (Netherlands) Lisa Post
- (Netherlands) Pien Sanders
- (Netherlands) Xan de Waard
- (Spain) Berta Agulló
- (Spain) Teresa Lima
- (Spain) Marta Segú

Source: FIH

== See also ==
- 2025–26 Men's FIH Pro League
