= 2018–19 Women's Feldhockey-Bundesliga =

Bundesliga
- Season: 2018–2019
- Dates: 1 September 2018 – 19 May 2019
- Champions: Club an der Alster (2nd title)
- Regular season: UHC Hamburg
- Relegated: Bremer HC; TSV Mannheim
- Euro Hockey League: Club an der Alster
- Matches played: 135
- Goals scored: 537 (3.98 per match)
- Biggest home win: Club an der Alster 11–0 Zehlen. Wespen
- Biggest away win: Zehlen Wespen. 0–10 Club an der Alster

The 2018–19 Bundesliga was the 74th season of the Bundesliga, Germany's premier field hockey league. It began on 1 September 2018 and it concluded with the championship final on 19 May 2019 in Krefeld.

Club an der Alster were the defending champions.

== Teams ==
2018–2019 Feldhockey-Bundesliga teams
Location of Hamburg teams

A total of 12 teams participated in the 2018–2019 edition of the Bundesliga. The promoted teams were Bremer HC and Zehlendorfer Wespen, who replaced Großflottbeker THGC and Club Raffelberg.

Team	Location	State
Berliner HC	Berlin	Berlin
Bremer HC	Bremen	Bremen
Club an der Alster	Hamburg	Hamburg
Düsseldorfer HC	Düsseldorf	North Rhine-Westphalia
UHC Hamburg	Hamburg	Hamburg
Harvestehuder THC	Hamburg	Hamburg
Mannheimer HC	Mannheim	Baden-Württemberg
Münchner SC	Munich	Bavaria
Rot-Weiss Köln	Cologne	North Rhine-Westphalia
TSV Mannheim	Mannheim	Baden-Württemberg
Uhlenhorst Mülheim	Mülheim	North Rhine-Westphalia
Zehlendorfer Wespen	Berlin	Berlin

=== Number of teams by state ===
State	Number of teams	Clubs
Hamburg	3	Club an der Alster, Harvestehuder THC and UHC Hamburg
North Rhine-Westphalia	3	Düsseldorfer HC, Rot-Weiss Köln and Uhlenhorst Mülheim
Berlin	2	Berliner HC and Zehlendorfer Wespen
Baden-Württemberg	2	Mannheimer HC and TSV Mannheim
Bavaria	1	Münchner SC
Bremen	1	Bremer HC
Total	12	

== Results ==
=== Regular season ===
Pos	Team	Pld	W	D	L	GF	GA	GD	Pts	Qualification
1	UHC Hamburg	22	19	0	3	73	29	+44	57	Advanced to Semi-finals
2	Mannheimer HC	22	17	3	2	70	19	+51	54	Advanced to Semi-finals
3	Düsseldorfer HC	22	15	4	3	54	29	+25	49	Advanced to Semi-finals
4	Club an der Alster	22	15	3	4	94	17	+77	48	Advanced to Semi-finals
5	Rot-Weiss Köln	22	8	6	8	30	28	+2	30	
6	Uhlenhorst Mülheim	22	8	4	10	38	46	−8	28	
7	Berliner HC	22	7	4	11	32	34	−2	25	
8	Harvestehuder THC	22	6	6	10	40	52	−12	24	
9	Münchner SC	22	6	5	11	30	54	−24	23	
10	Zehlendorfer Wespen	22	5	3	14	22	83	−61	18	
11	TSV Mannheim	22	3	3	16	25	71	−46	12	Relegated to 2019–21 Bundesliga Division B
12	Bremer HC	22	0	5	17	17	63	−46	5	Relegated to 2019–21 Bundesliga Division B

Source: Deutscher Hockey-Bund
Rules for classification: 1) Points; 2) Goal difference; 3) Goals scored; 4) Games won; 5) Head-to-head.

=== Results ===
Home \ Away	BER	BRE	ALS	DÜS	HAM	HAR	MAN	MÜN	RWK	TSV	MÜL	ZEH
Berliner HC	—	3–1	1–1	1–2	0–3	4–0	1–2	3–0	3–2	2–1	1–2	4–0
Bremer HC	0–0	—	1–6	1–4	2–7	1–2	0–5	1–3	1–1	1–1	1–3	1–2
Club an der Alster	4–0	4–1	—	7–1	1–2	6–1	1–2	6–1	2–0	8–0	6–1	11–0
Düsseldorfer HC	1–0	3–0	1–0	—	3–4	1–2	1–0	7–1	3–1	3–0	1–1	1–1
UHC Hamburg	2–1	4–1	1–3	3–4	—	3–1	2–1	3–2	2–1	4–0	3–1	3–1
Harvestehuder THC	3–4	2–0	1–1	2–3	1–4	—	0–3	6–2	1–1	0–0	2–2	7–3
Mannheimer HC	4–1	3–1	2–1	1–1	3–2	1–1	—	2–0	2–1	9–0	4–3	8–0
Münchner SC	1–0	0–0	0–5	1–1	0–2	2–1	1–6	—	1–1	2–1	2–2	1–1
Rot-Weiss Köln	1–0	1–1	1–1	0–1	0–3	0–1	1–1	2–1	—	5–2	2–0	3–0
TSV Mannheim	2–1	5–0	0–4	0–5	2–4	4–4	0–2	1–5	1–3	—	0–5	1–2
Uhlenhorst Mülheim	0–0	3–2	0–6	2–3	0–2	2–1	1–3	3–2	1–2	2–1	—	3–0
Zehlendorfer Wespen	2–2	1–0	0–10	1–4	1–10	5–1	0–6	0–2	0–1	0–3	2–1	—

Source: Flash Score
Legend: Blue = home team win; Yellow = draw; Red = away team win.

=== Play–offs ===
Semi-finals
18 May 2019
UHC Hamburg	0
Club an der Alster	5
18 May 2019
Mannheimer HC	2
Düsseldorfer HC	3

Final
19 May 2019
Club an der Alster (pen.)	1 (3)
Düsseldorfer HC	1 (1)

==== Semi-finals ====
18 May 2019
11:00

UHC Hamburg	0–5	Club an der Alster
	Report	Gablać 1'; Sippel 5'; Wiedermann 26'; Huse 35'; Wolbers 45'

Crefelder THC, Krefeld
Umpires:
G. Schmitz (GER)
T. Hinsken (GER)

18 May 2019
13:00

Mannheimer HC	2–3	Düsseldorfer HC
Kanler 4'; Cavallero 26'	Report	Lhotak 4'; Markert 35'; Nolte 46'

Crefelder THC, Krefeld
Umpires:
M. Meister (GER)
O. Ingwersen (GER)

==== Final ====
19 May 2019
12:00

Club an der Alster	1–1	Düsseldorfer HC
Wiedermann 17'	Report	Markert 6'
Penalties
Schröder (penalty shoot-out scored); Granitzki (penalty shoot-out missed); Kerner (penalty shoot-out missed); Gablać (penalty shoot-out scored); Huse (penalty shoot-out scored)	3–1	(penalty shoot-out scored) Gräve; (penalty shoot-out missed) Lhotak; (penalty shoot-out missed) Schubert; (penalty shoot-out missed) Markert

Crefelder THC, Krefeld
Umpires:
T. Hinsken (GER)
O. Ingwersen (GER)
