= Ireland women's national field hockey team =

Ireland
- Association: Hockey Ireland
- Confederation: EHF (Europe)
- Head Coach: Gareth Grundie
- Assistant coach(es): Graeme Francey; Nigel Henderson; Mick McKinnon
- Manager: Ruth McDonagh
- Captain: Sarah Hawkshaw
Home	Away

FIH ranking
- Current: 13 (3 October 2026)

Olympic Games
- Appearances: 1 (first in 2020)
- Best result: 10th (2020)

World Cup
- Appearances: 5 (first in 1986)
- Best result: (silver) 2nd (2018)

EuroHockey Championship
- Appearances: 16 (first in 1984)
- Best result: 5th (1984, 2005, 2009), 2019)
Medal record
World Cup
Silver medal – second place	2018 London

The Ireland women's national field hockey team is organised by Hockey Ireland and represents both the Republic of Ireland and Northern Ireland in international women's field hockey competitions, including the Women's Hockey World Cup and the Women's EuroHockey Nations Championship. They have previously competed in the Women's Intercontinental Cup, the Women's Hockey Champions Challenge, Women's FIH Hockey World League and the Women's FIH Hockey Series. The team also competes at the Summer Olympics, though it officially only represents the Republic of Ireland then (using the Republic's flag and national anthem), while still selecting players from the entire island.

On 2 March 1896, Ireland played England in the first ever women's international field hockey match. Ireland were finalists and silver medallists at the 2018 Women's Hockey World Cup and competed at the 2020 Olympic tournament.

== History ==
=== Early years ===
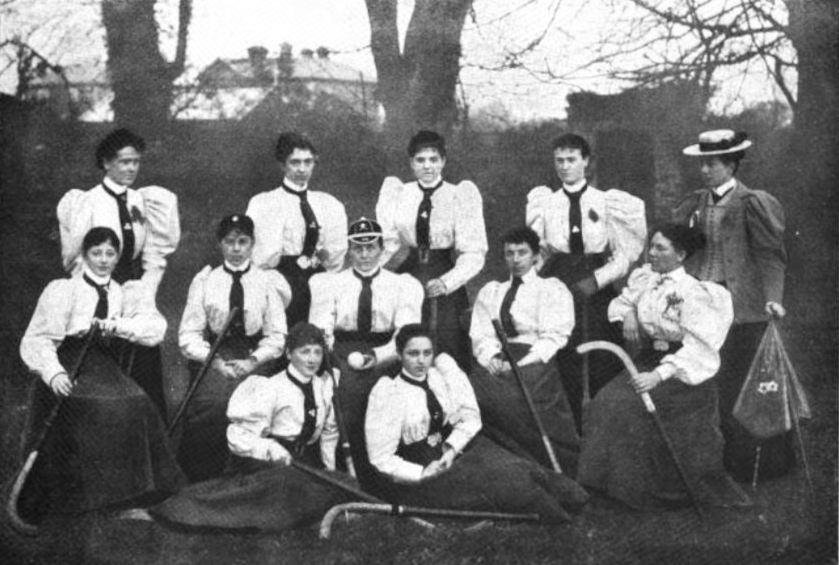
July 1896

The Irish Ladies Hockey Union was established in 1894. On 2 March 1896 they organised and hosted the first ever women's international field hockey match when Ireland defeated England 2–0 at Alexandra College.

== Tournament record ==
=== Olympics ===
Ireland have qualified for the 2020 summer olympics Olympic Games. They were invited to enter the inaugural 1980 tournament but did not participate because of the boycott. Between 1991 and 2012 Ireland competed in Olympic qualifiers. In 2012 they reached the final of a qualifying tournament but lost 4–1 to Belgium. Ireland attempted to qualify for the 2016 Summer Olympics via the 2014–15 Women's FIH Hockey World League. However they failed to qualify after losing out to China in a penalty shoot-out during a tournament in Valencia.

Tournament	Place
1991 Women's Field Hockey Olympic Qualifier	11th
2000 Women's Field Hockey Olympic Qualifier	8th
2004 Women's Field Hockey Olympic Qualifier	8th
2008 Women's Field Hockey Olympic Qualifier	3rd
2012 Women's Field Hockey Olympic Qualifier	2nd
2019 Women's FIH Olympic Qualifiers	
2020 Summer Olympics	10th

=== World Cup ===
Early tournaments

Ireland have played in six Women's Hockey World Cups, making their debut in 1986. Ireland qualified for their first tournament after winning the 1983 Women's Intercontinental Cup. Ireland hosted the 1994 Women's Hockey World Cup and made their third appearance in 2002 after finishing fifth in the 2001 Women's Intercontinental Cup.

2018 Women's Hockey World Cup

Ireland were finalists and silver medallists at the 2018 Women's Hockey World Cup. Deirdre Duke scored twice against the United States as Ireland won their opening pool stage game 3–1. Shirley McCay was also on target for Ireland. In their second pool game against India, Anna O'Flanagan's goal secured a 1–0 win for Ireland and a place in the quarter-finals. Ireland lost their third pool game against England. However, after winning their first two games, they had already qualified for the knockout stages. The quarter-final against India finished 0–0 but Roisin Upton, Alison Meeke and Chloe Watkins were all on target as Ireland won the penalty shoot-out 3–1. Ireland coach Graham Shaw hailed Ayeisha McFerran's performance in the penalty shoot-out after she saved three out of the four India penalty strokes. In the semi-final against Spain, O'Flanagan scored her second goal before Spain equalised and the game finished 1–1. In the subsequent penalty shoot-out, Ireland won 3–2, with Gillian Pinder scoring twice and McFerran again saving three penalty strokes. Despite losing the final 6–0 to the Netherlands, Ireland were acclaimed for their overall performance in the tournament. They had begun the tournament as underdogs, the second lowest seed. They were ranked 15th out of sixteen teams taking part. Their team was made up of part-timers and amateurs while in the final they played a team of full-time professionals. It was reported in The Irish Times that the players had to pay €550 to compete. Although this claim was subsequently denied by both Sport Ireland and the Minister for Transport, Tourism and Sport, Shane Ross. Following their appearance in the World Cup final, Ireland moved up to a best ever eighth position in the FIH World Rankings. Their previous highest ranking position was 14th.

Tournament	Place
1986 Women's Hockey World Cup	12th
1994 Women's Hockey World Cup	11th
2002 Women's Hockey World Cup	15th
2010 Women's Hockey World Cup Qualifiers	3rd
2018 Women's Hockey World Cup	2nd place, silver medalist(s)
2022 Women's FIH Hockey World Cup	11th
2026 Women's FIH Hockey World Cup	13th

=== EuroHockey Championships ===
Ireland competed in every Women's EuroHockey Nations Championship between 1984 and 2013. However, after finishing 7th in 2013, they were relegated to the second level, Women's EuroHockey Championship II. Ireland subsequently returned to the top level after winning the 2015 Women's EuroHockey Championship II, defeating the Czech Republic 5–0 in the final.

Tournament	Place
1984 Women's EuroHockey Nations Championship	5th
1987 Women's EuroHockey Nations Championship	7th
1991 Women's EuroHockey Nations Championship	8th
1995 Women's EuroHockey Nations Championship	8th
1999 Women's EuroHockey Nations Championship	9th
2003 Women's EuroHockey Nations Championship	6th
2005 Women's EuroHockey Nations Championship	5th
2007 Women's EuroHockey Nations Championship	6th
2009 Women's EuroHockey Nations Championship	5th
2011 Women's EuroHockey Nations Championship	6th
2013 Women's EuroHockey Nations Championship	7th
2015 Women's EuroHockey Championship II	1st
2017 Women's EuroHockey Nations Championship	6th
2019 Women's EuroHockey Nations Championship	5th
2021 Women's EuroHockey Nations Championship	6th
2023 Women's EuroHockey Nations Championship	5th
2025 Women's EuroHockey Championship	8th
2027 Women's EuroHockey Championship	Qualified

=== Women's Intercontinental Cup ===
Between 1983 and 2006 Ireland played regularly in the Women's Intercontinental Cup. Ireland qualified for the 1986 Women's Hockey World Cup after winning the 1983 Women's Intercontinental Cup. The team was captained by Margaret Gleghorne and also included Mary Geaney. Ireland qualified for the 2002 Women's Hockey World Cup after finishing 5th in the 2001 Women's Intercontinental Cup in controversial circumstances. Ireland played Lithuania in a fifth to eighth place classification match. The match finished 2–2 and Lithuania won the subsequent penalty shoot-out 6–5. However Ireland captain, Rachel Kohler, spotted that the penalty strokes were being taken in the wrong order. She was initially ignored by the match officials, but Ireland appealed and the tournament director ruled the shoot-out should be replayed the next day. However Lithuania refused to take part and withdrew from the tournament. Ireland went on to defeat Scotland 2–1 in the fifth place play-off and were initially confirmed as the final qualifier from the tournament. Before the match the Lithuania team staged a sit down protest on the pitch. Lithuania lodged a further appeal to the FIH who then ordered that Ireland, Lithuania, India and the United States take part in a second qualification tournament. Lithuania were due to play India in a seventh and eighth place play-off before they withdrew. The United States had been unable to participate in the original tournament due to the disruption of airline schedules after the September 11 attacks. However Ireland in turn appealed to the Court of Arbitration for Sport who overruled the FIH decision and finally confirmed Ireland's place in the 2002 Women's Hockey World Cup.

Tournaments	Place
1983 Women's Intercontinental Cup	1st
1989 Women's Intercontinental Cup	6th
1997 Women's Intercontinental Cup	8th
2001 Women's Intercontinental Cup	5th
2006 Women's Intercontinental Cup	8th

=== Women's Hockey Champions Challenge ===
Between 2009 and 2014 Ireland enter teams in Women's Hockey Champions Challenge tournaments.

Season	Place
2009 Women's Hockey Champions Challenge II	3rd
2011 Women's Hockey Champions Challenge I	6th
2012 Women's Hockey Champions Challenge I	3rd
2014 Women's Hockey Champions Challenge I	2nd

=== Women's FIH Hockey World League ===
Between 2012 and 2017 Ireland competed in the Women's FIH Hockey World League. In March 2015 they won a Round 2 tournament hosted in Dublin, defeating Canada in the final after a penalty shoot-out. Ireland attempted to qualify for the 2016 Summer Olympics via the 2014–15 Women's FIH Hockey World League. However they failed to qualify after losing out to China in a penalty shoot-out during the Semi-finals tournament in Valencia. In January 2017 they won a Round 2 tournament in Kuala Lumpur, defeating Malaysia 3–0 in the final with goals from Anna O'Flanagan, Katie Mullan and Zoe Wilson. Ireland's seventh-place finish at the 2016–17 Women's FIH Hockey World League Semi-finals eventually saw them qualify for the 2018 Women's Hockey World Cup.

Season	Place
2012–13 Women's FIH Hockey World League Round 2	4th
2014–15 Women's FIH Hockey World League Round 2	1st
2014–15 Women's FIH Hockey World League Semi-finals	8th
2016–17 Women's FIH Hockey World League Round 2	1st
2016–17 Women's FIH Hockey World League Semi-finals	7th

=== Women's FIH Hockey Series ===
During 2019, Ireland played in the Women's FIH Series.

Season	Place
2018–19 Women's FIH Series Finals	2nd

=== Women's FIH Pro League ===
Tournaments	Place
2025–26 Women's FIH Pro League	9th

=== Women's FIH Hockey Nations Cup ===
Tournaments	Place
2022 Women's FIH Hockey Nations Cup	4th
2023–24 Women's FIH Hockey Nations Cup	2nd
2024–25 Women's FIH Hockey Nations Cup	2nd

=== Invitational tournaments ===
Tournament	Place
2012 Women's Hockey Investec Cup	6th
2016 Hawke's Bay Cup	5th
2017 Women's Four Nations Cup	2nd

== Current squad ==
Roster for the 2026 Women's FIH Hockey World Cup.

Head coach: Gareth Grundie

2. Elizabeth Murphy (GK)
3. Sarah McAuley
5. Michelle Carey
6. Róisín Upton
7. Niamh Carey
8. Sarah Hawkshaw (C)
9. Kathryn Mullan
10. Hannah McLoughlin
11. Sarah Torrans
12. Elena Tice
14. Ellen Curran
15. Caoimhe Perdue
16. Charlotte Beggs
17. Christina Hamill
23. Holly Micklem (GK)
28. Katie Larmour
29. Mikayla Power
30. Emily Kealy
31. Mia Jennings
44. Aisling Utri

=== 2018 Women's Hockey World Cup silver medallists ===
- Emily Beatty
- Lizzie Colvin
- Nicola Daly
- Deirdre Duke
- Nicola Evans
- Megan Frazer
- Hannah Matthews
- Alison Meeke
- Ayeisha McFerran
- Shirley McCay
- Katie Mullan
- Yvonne O'Byrne
- Anna O'Flanagan
- Grace O'Flanagan
- Gillian Pinder
- Elena Tice
- Roisin Upton
- Chloe Watkins
- Zoe Wilson

=== Olympians ===
Great Britain

The following Ireland internationals have also represented Great Britain at the Summer Olympics.

- Violet McBride – 1988
- Jackie McWilliams – 1992

Others

Ireland field hockey internationals, Thelma Hopkins and Maeve Kyle, have also represented Great Britain and Ireland, respectively, at the Olympics. Both competed as track and field athletes.

- (United Kingdom) Thelma Hopkins – 1952, 1956
- (Republic of Ireland) Maeve Kyle – 1956, 1960, 1964

=== Coaches ===
Years	
19xx–1998	(Northern Ireland) Terry Gregg
1998–2006	(Netherlands) Riet Kuper
2006–2012	(South Africa) Gene Muller
2013–2015	(New Zealand) Darren Smith
2015–2019	(Ireland) Graham Shaw
2019–2024	(Australia) Sean Dancer
2024–	(Ireland) Gareth Grundie

== Results and fixtures ==
The following is a list of match results in the last 12 months, as well as any future matches that have been scheduled.

Win Draw Loss Fixture

=== 2026 ===
10 February 2026 2025–26 FIH Pro League	Ireland	0–5	Argentina	Hobart, Australia
19:30		Report	Gorzelany 16'; Bruggesser 19'; Jankunas 35'; Granatto 45'; Casas 55'	Stadium: Tasmanian Hockey Centre

12 February 2026 2025–26 FIH Pro League	Australia	0–0 (4–2 p)	Ireland	Hobart, Australia
19:30		Report		Stadium: Tasmanian Hockey Centre
	Penalties
	Downes (penalty shoot-out scored); Williams (penalty shoot-out scored); Arnott (penalty shoot-out scored); Stewart (penalty shoot-out missed); Nobbs (penalty shoot-out scored)		(penalty shoot-out missed) Beggs; (penalty shoot-out missed) Power; (penalty shoot-out scored) McLoughlin; (penalty shoot-out scored) McMaster

13 February 2026 2025–26 FIH Pro League	Argentina	2–1	Ireland	Hobart, Australia
19:30	Granatto 15'; Gorzelany 37'	Report	McAuley 3'	Stadium: Tasmanian Hockey Centre

15 February 2026 2025–26 FIH Pro League	Australia	1–4	Ireland	Hobart, Australia
18:30	Downes 3'	Report	Curran 17'; Mullan 27'; Hawkshaw 34'; McLoughlin 56'	Stadium: Tasmanian Hockey Centre

2 March 2026 WC Qualifiers GS	Ireland	5–0	Malaysia	Santiago, Chile
15:15	Mullan 21'; Perdue 24'; McAuley 34'; M. Carey 37'; Upton 40'	Report		Stadium: Estadio National del Hockey Césped Claudia Schüler

3 March 2026 WC Qualifiers GS	Ireland	2–1	Japan	Santiago, Chile
15:45	N. Carey 18'; Perdue 29'	Report	Toriyama 55'	Stadium: Estadio National del Hockey Césped Claudia Schüler

5 March 2026 WC Qualifiers GS	Canada	1–5	Ireland	Santiago, Chile
15:15	Mollenhauer 13'	Report	Torrans 25', 36'; Perdue 30'; McMaster 38'; Handcock 60'	Stadium: Estadio National del Hockey Césped Claudia Schüler

7 March 2026 WC Qualifiers Semi Final	Ireland	0–1	Australia	Santiago, Chile
18:00		Report	Colwill 28'	Stadium: Estadio Nacional del Hockey Césped Claudia Schüler

8 March 2026 WC Qualifiers Third place	Japan	0–0 (1–3 p)	Ireland	Santiago, Chile
18:00		Report		Stadium: Estadio Nacional del Hockey Césped Claudia Schüler
	Penalties
	Kobayakawa (penalty shoot-out scored); Hasegawa (penalty shoot-out missed); Toriyama (penalty shoot-out missed); Nakagomi (penalty shoot-out missed)		(penalty shoot-out scored) Hawkshaw; (penalty shoot-out scored) McLoughlin; (penalty shoot-out missed) Kealy; (penalty shoot-out scored) McMaster

13 June 2026 2025–26 FIH Pro League	Netherlands	7–0	Ireland	Rotterdam, Netherlands
13:30	Waard 2'; Fokke 4', 39'; Dicke 9', 37'; Jansen 23'; Sanders 51'	Report		Stadium: Hazelaarweg Stadion

14 June 2026 2025–26 FIH Pro League	Netherlands	4–0	Ireland	Rotterdam, Netherlands
13:30	Jansen 3'; Matla 8'; Burg 29'; Albers 37'	Report		Stadium: Hazelaarweg Stadion

17 June 2026 2025–26 FIH Pro League	Spain	1–1 (3–0 p)	Ireland	Rotterdam, Netherlands
17:00	Mejias 9'	Report	McLoughlin 15'	Stadium: Hazelaarweg Stadion
	Penalties
	Jiménez (penalty shoot-out scored); Teresa (penalty shoot-out scored); Vidosa (penalty shoot-out scored)		(penalty shoot-out missed) Hawkshaw; (penalty shoot-out missed) McLoughlin; (penalty shoot-out missed) Power

18 June 2026 2025–26 FIH Pro League	Ireland	3–1	Spain	Rotterdam, Netherlands
17:00	Kealy 29'; Carey 37'; McAuley 40'	Report	Jiménez 55'	Stadium: Hazelaarweg Stadion

23 June 2026 2025–26 FIH Pro League	Germany	2–0	Ireland	Berlin, Germany
20:30	Krings 51'; Strauss 59'	Report		Stadium: Ernst-Reuter Sportfeld

24 June 2026 2025–26 FIH Pro League	China	2–1	Ireland	Berlin, Germany
17:30	Yang L. 25'; Zhong 58'	Report	Hawkshaw 1'	Stadium: Ernst-Reuter Sportfeld

26 June 2026 2025–26 FIH Pro League	Germany	3–1	Ireland	Berlin, Germany
20:30	Stoffelsma 9'; Micheel 55'; Krings 60'	Report	Torrans 55'	Stadium: Ernst-Reuter Sportfeld

27 June 2026 2025–26 FIH Pro League	Ireland	0–1	China	Berlin, Germany
16:30		Report	Zhang Ying 6'	Stadium: Ernst-Reuter Sportfeld

16 August 2026 World Cup Pool B	Spain	3–2	Ireland	Wavre, Belgium
20:30	Vidosa 24'; Keenan 39'; Gine 56'	Report	McLoughlin 37'; Carey 42'	Stadium: Belfius Hockey Arena

18 August 2026 World Cup Pool B	New Zealand	2–3	Ireland	Wavre, Belgium
11:00	Surridge 35'; Doar 60'	Report	Hawkshaw 24'; Upton 49'; Mullan 57'	Stadium: Belfius Hockey Arena

20 August 2026 World Cup Pool B	Belgium	2–1	Ireland	Wavre, Belgium
20:30	Englebert 49'; Ballenghien 60'	Report	Beggs 13'	Stadium: Belfius Hockey Arena

22 August 2026 World Cup Pool H	Ireland	1–2	Scotland	Wavre, Belgium
11:30	Kealy 26'	Report	Mackenzie 6'; Watson 34'	Stadium: Belfius Hockey Arena

24 August 2026 World Cup Pool H	Ireland	1–3	United States	Wavre, Belgium
14:00	Carey 13'	Report	Adams 27'; Schoenbeck 42'; Tamer 52'	Stadium: Belfius Hockey Arena

27 August 2026 World Cup 13th place match	South Africa	0–1	Ireland	Amstelveen, Netherlands
09:30		Report	Carey 14'	Stadium: Wagener Stadium

== Honours ==
- Women's Hockey World Cup
  - Runners-up: 2018
- Women's FIH Hockey World League Round 2
  - Winners: 2015 Dublin, 2017 Kuala Lumpur
- Women's EuroHockey Championship II
  - Winners: 2015
- Women's Intercontinental Cup
  - Winners: 1983
- Women's Hockey Champions Challenge I
  - Runners-up: 2014
- Women's FIH Hockey Series
  - Runners-up: 2019 Banbridge
- Women's Four Nations Cup
  - Runners-up: 2017
- Women's Field Hockey Olympic Qualifier
  - Runners-up: 2012
