= 2016 Girls' EuroHockey Youth Championships =

Tournament details
- Host country: Ireland
- City: Cork
- Dates: 24–30 July
- Teams: 8 (from 1 confederation)
- Venue: Mardyke Arena

Final positions
- Champions: Netherlands (7th title)
- Runner-up: Germany
- Third place: England

Tournament statistics
- Matches played: 20
- Goals scored: 105 (5.25 per match)
- Top scorer(s): (Netherlands) Carmel Bosch (Netherlands) Yibbi Jansen (Russia) Valeriia Borisova (7 goals)
- Best player: (Russia) Valeriia Borisova

The 2016 Girls' EuroHockey Youth Championships was the ninth edition of the Girls' EuroHockey Youth Championships. The tournament was held alongside the boys' tournament from 24 to 30 July 2016 in Cork, Ireland at the Mardyke Arena.

Netherlands won the tournament for the seventh time after defeating Germany 2–0 in the final.

== Qualified teams ==
The following teams participated in the 2016 EuroHockey Youth Championship:

Dates	Event	Location	Quotas	Qualifiers
19–25 July 2015	2015 EuroHockey Youth Championship	Santander, Spain	6	Belgium; England; Germany; Netherlands; Russia; Spain
6–12 August 2017	2015 EuroHockey Youth Championship II	Mori, Italy	1	Ireland; Poland
Total			8	

== Format ==
The eight teams were split into two groups of four teams. The top two teams advanced to the semifinals to determine the winner in a knockout system. The bottom two teams played in a new group with the teams they did not play against in the group stage. The last two teams were relegated to the EuroHockey Youth Championship II.

== Preliminary round ==
=== Pool A ===
Pos	Team	Pld	W	D	L	GF	GA	GD	Pts	Qualification
1	Netherlands	3	3	0	0	23	6	+17	9	Semi-finals
2	Belgium	3	2	0	1	11	6	+5	6	Semi-finals
3	Spain	3	1	0	2	9	6	+3	3	
4	Poland	3	0	0	3	1	26	−25	0	

Source: EHF
Rules for classification: 1) points; 2) goal difference; 3) goals scored; 4) head-to-head result.

24 July 2016
09:45

Netherlands	4–3	Spain
Van der Elst 12'; Jansen 21', 23', 69'	Report	Álvarez 42', 68'; Torres-Quevedo 60'

Umpires:
Violeta Eismayer (AUT)
Valeria Kolbina (RUS)

24 July 2016
12:00

Belgium	7–0	Poland
Boey 3', 30'; Struijk 15', 35' 'T Serstevens 33'; Vandersteen 57'; Lycke 60'	Report

Umpires:
Sophie Bockelmann (GER)
Fiona Davitt (IRE)

25 July 2016
11:00

Spain	5–0	Poland
F. Amundson 8'; Ycart 34'; Álvarez 49', 59'; Abajo Sáenz De Tejada 61'	Report

Umpires:
Valeria Kolbina (RUS)
Fiona Davitt (IRE)

25 July 2016
13:15

Belgium	2–5	Netherlands
Sistermans 3'; Ikegwuonu 17'	Report	Bosch 13'; Jansen 50', 52'; Dicke 56'; Moes 63'

Umpires:
Sophie Bockelmann (GER)
Caroline Standfield (ENG)

27 July 2016
15:30

Spain	1–2	Belgium
Barba 2'	Report	'T Serstevens 21'; Struijk 31'

Umpires:
Fiona Davitt (IRE)
Caroline Standfield (ENG)

27 July 2016
17:45

Netherlands	14–1	Poland
Jansen 2', 47'; Albers 8'; Dicke 31', 40'; Bosch 35', 37', 41', 50', 55'; Van der Marel 45'; Van der Elst 60', 64'; De Jong 62'	Report	Suszyńska 10'

Umpires:
Sophie Bockelmann (GER)
Valeria Kolbina (RUS)

=== Pool B ===
Pos	Team	Pld	W	D	L	GF	GA	GD	Pts	Qualification
1	Germany	3	2	0	1	11	4	+7	6	Semi-finals
2	England	3	2	0	1	8	8	0	6	Semi-finals
3	Russia	3	1	0	2	7	9	−2	3	
4	Ireland (H)	3	1	0	2	3	8	−5	3	

Source: EHF
Rules for classification: 1) points; 2) goal difference; 3) goals scored; 4) head-to-head result.
(H) Hosts

24 July 2016
15:30

Germany	2–3	Russia
Althof 13'; Zimmermann 40'	Report	Eroshina 8'; Borisova 28', 63'

Umpires:
Susanne de Gier (NED)
Karolina Drabik (POL)

24 July 2016
17:45

England	3–0	Ireland
Jefferson 5'; Howard 18'; Wolstenholme 59'	Report

Umpires:
Gema Calderón (ESP)
Magali Sergeant (BEL)

26 July 2016
10:00

England	1–6	Germany
Howard 60'	Report	Günther 11'; Pluta 17', 30', 70'; Kiefer 26'; Arndt 48'

Umpires:
Violeta Eismayer (AUT)
Magali Sergeant (BEL)

26 July 2016
14:30

Russia	2–3	Ireland
Borisova 20', 37'	Report	Irwin 51'; McMaster 65'; Barry 70'

Umpires:
Gema Calderón (ESP)
Susanne de Gier (NED)

27 July 2016
09:45

Russia	2–4	England
Borisova 16'; Golubeva 49'	Report	Gooderham 9'; Jefferson 36'; Millington 50'; Wolstenholme 62'

Umpires:
Magali Sergeant (BEL)
Gema Calderón (ESP)

27 July 2016
12:00

Germany	3–0	Ireland
Maertens 5'; Heyn 21'; Boermans 45'	Report

Umpires:
Violeta Eismayer (AUT)
Karolina Drabik (POL)

== Fifth to eighth place classification ==
=== Pool C ===
Pos	Team	Pld	W	D	L	GF	GA	GD	Pts	Relegation
1	Spain	3	3	0	0	14	2	+12	9	
2	Ireland (H)	3	2	0	1	5	8	−3	6	
3	Russia (R)	3	1	0	2	12	9	+3	3	Youth Championship II
4	Poland (R)	3	0	0	3	3	15	−12	0	Youth Championship II

Source: EHF
Rules for classification: 1) points; 2) goal difference; 3) goals scored; 4) head-to-head result.
(H) Hosts; (R) Relegated

29 July 2016
15:30

Poland	0–1	Ireland
	Report	Curran 12'

Umpires:
Susanne de Gier (NED)
Valeria Kolbina (RUS)

29 July 2016
17:45

Spain	3–1	Russia
F. Amundson 11', 68'; Ycart 49'	Report	Borisova 41'

Umpires:
Magali Sergeant (BEL)
Violeta Eismayer (AUT)

30 July 2016
13:45

Russia	9–3	Poland
Borisova 8'; Sartakova 12', 21', 69'; Golubeva 18', 60'; Eroshina 29', 43'; Serova 34'	Report	Suszyńska 35'; Glowacka 63'; Polewczak 70+'

Umpires:
Susanne de Gier (NED)
Magali Sergeant (BEL)

30 July 2016
16:00

Spain	6–1	Ireland
F. Amundson 13'; Abajo Sáenz De Tejada 27', 46'; Barba 43'; Álvarez 67'; Conill 69'	Report	M. Carey 52'

Umpires:
Caroline Standfield (ENG)
Karolina Drabik (POL)

== First to fourth place classification ==
=== Bracket ===
Semi-finals
29 July
Netherlands	3
England	0
29 July
Germany	1
Belgium	0

Final
30 July
Netherlands	2
Germany	0
Third place
30 July
England (p.s.o.)	1 (3)
Belgium	1 (2)

=== Semi-finals ===
29 July 2016
09:30

Netherlands	3–0	England
Moes 38'; Dicke 46'; Bosch 67'	Report

Umpires:
Fiona Davitt (IRE)
Sophie Bockelmann (GER)

29 July 2016
12:00

Germany	1–0	Belgium
Arndt 4'	Report

Umpires:
Gema Calderón (ESP)
Caroline Standfield (ENG)

=== Third and fourth place ===
30 July 2016
10:00

England	1–1	Belgium
Millington 37'	Report	Goeminne 67'
Penalties
Burge (penalty shoot-out scored); Millington (penalty shoot-out missed); Tarrant (penalty shoot-out scored); Wolstenholme (penalty shoot-out scored)	3–2	(penalty shoot-out missed) Boey; (penalty shoot-out missed) Limauge; (penalty shoot-out scored) Ikegwuonu; (penalty shoot-out scored) De Clercq; (penalty shoot-out missed) Lycke

Umpires:
Sophie Bockelmann (GER)
Gema Calderón (ESP)

=== Final ===
30 July 2016
15:00

Netherlands	2–0	Germany
Van der Elst 30', 65'	Report

Umpires:
Violeta Eismayer (AUT)
Fiona Davitt (IRE)

== Statistics ==
=== Final standings ===
Pos	Team	Relegation
1st place, gold medalist(s)	Netherlands (C)	
2nd place, silver medalist(s)	Germany	
3rd place, bronze medalist(s)	England	
4	Belgium	
5	Spain	
6	Ireland (H)	
7	Russia (R)	Youth Championship II
8	Poland (R)	Youth Championship II

Source: EHF
(C) Champion; (H) Host; (R) Relegated

=== Awards ===
Player of the Tournament	Top Goalscorers	Goalkeeper of the Tournament
(Russia) Valeriia Borisova	(Netherlands) Carmel Bosch (Netherlands) Yibbi Jansen (Russia) Valeriia Borisova	(Russia) Karina Golovastikova

=== Goalscorers ===
There were 105 goals scored in 20 matches, for an average of 5.25 goals per match.

7 goals

- (Netherlands) Carmel Bosch
- (Netherlands) Yibbi Jansen
- (Russia) Valeriia Borisova

5 goals

- (Netherlands) Fay van der Elst
- (Spain) Patricia Álvarez

4 goals

- (Netherlands) Pien Dicke
- (Spain) Florencia Amundson

3 goals

- (Belgium) Michelle Struijk
- (Germany) Nicola Pluta
- (Russia) Svetlana Eroshina
- (Russia) Anna Golubeva
- (Russia) Iuliia Sartakova
- (Spain) Lucía Abajo Sáenz De Tejada

2 goals

- (Belgium) Leylou Boey
- (Belgium) Alexia 't Serstevens
- (England) Tessa Howard
- (England) Sophie Jefferson
- (England) Lucy Millington
- (England) Lily Wolstenholme
- (Germany) Liv Arndt
- (Netherlands) Freeke Moes
- (Poland) Natasza Suszyńska
- (Spain) Anna Barba
- (Spain) Clara Ycart

1 goal

- (Belgium) Laetitia Goeminne
- (Belgium) Shaunda Ikegwuonu
- (Belgium) Camille Lycke
- (Belgium) Damy Sistermans
- (Belgium) Anouck Vandersteen
- (England) Abby Gooderham
- (Germany) Solvej Althof
- (Germany) Emma Boermans
- (Germany) Feline Günther
- (Germany) Naomi Heyn
- (Germany) Katharina Kiefer
- (Germany) Pia Maertens
- (Germany) Sonja Zimmermann
- (Ireland) Jane Barry
- (Ireland) Michelle Carey
- (Ireland) Ellen Curran
- (Ireland) Hannah Irwin
- (Ireland) Jessica McMaster
- (Netherlands) Felice Albers
- (Netherlands) Paula de Jong
- (Netherlands) Nina van der Marel
- (Poland) Kinga Glowacka
- (Poland) Monika Polewczak
- (Russia) Varvara Serova
- (Spain) Alejandra Conill
- (Spain) Alejandra Torres-Quevedo

Source: EHF
