= Hockey in Germany =

Hockey in Germany may refer to:

== Field hockey ==
- German Hockey Federation
- Men's Feldhockey Bundesliga
- Women's Feldhockey Bundesliga

== Ice hockey ==
- Ice hockey in Germany
- German Ice Hockey Federation
- Deutsche Eishockey Liga
