= Field hockey at the 2016 Summer Olympics – Women's qualification =

The qualification for the Field hockey at the 2016 Summer Olympics was held from September 2014 to October 2015. There were three qualification events, host country, continental championship, and 2014–15 FIH Hockey World League Semifinals respectively. Total twelve teams could participated in the 2016 Summer Olympics.

== Qualification summary ==
| Date | Event | Location | Qualifier |
|---|---|---|---|
| 20 September – 2 October 2014 | 2014 Asian Games | Incheon, South Korea | South Korea |
| 10–21 June 2015 | 2014–15 FIH Hockey World League Semifinals | Valencia, Spain | China |
| 10–21 June 2015 | 2014–15 FIH Hockey World League Semifinals | Valencia, Spain | Germany |
| 10–21 June 2015 | 2014–15 FIH Hockey World League Semifinals | Valencia, Spain | Argentina |
| 10–21 June 2015 | 2014–15 FIH Hockey World League Semifinals | Valencia, Spain | Spain (Note: South Africa won the continental qualifier however the team did not participate in the 2016 Olympics. South African Sports Confederation and Olympic Committee (SASCOC) and South African Hockey Association (SAHA) made an agreement on the Rio 2016 Olympics qualification criteria that the Continental Qualification route would not be considered. As a result, Spain, as the highest-ranked team from the 2014–15 Hockey World League Semifinals not already qualified, participated instead.) |
| 20 June – 5 July 2015 | 2014–15 FIH Hockey World League Semifinals | Antwerp, Belgium | Netherlands |
| 20 June – 5 July 2015 | 2014–15 FIH Hockey World League Semifinals | Antwerp, Belgium | New Zealand |
| 20 June – 5 July 2015 | 2014–15 FIH Hockey World League Semifinals | Antwerp, Belgium | India |
| 20 June – 5 July 2015 | 2014–15 FIH Hockey World League Semifinals | Antwerp, Belgium | Japan |
| 13–24 July 2015 | 2015 Pan American Games | Toronto, Canada | United States |
| 22–30 August 2015 | 2015 EuroHockey Nations Championship | London, England | Great Britain (Note: Competed as England) |
| 21–25 October 2015 | 2015 Oceania Cup | Stratford, New Zealand | Australia |
| 23 October – 1 November 2015 | 2015 African Qualifying Tournament | Randburg, South Africa | — |
| Total | | | 12 |

== Host country ==
Each of the continental champions received a berth alongside the host Brazil, while another six spots were decided in the 2014–2015 FIH Hockey World League. As the host nation, Brazil had a guaranteed quota place if it satisfiesdthe following performance criteria set by FIH: the women's team should either obtain a world ranking equal to or better than fortieth place by the end of 2014, or not finish lower than seventh at the 2015 Pan American Games. They did not however meet any requirements and thuis did not qualify.

- Brazil did not meet any requirements, so the team did not qualify.

== Continental Qualification Tournament ==
| Qualified for the 2016 Summer Olympics |

=== Africa ===
| Rank | Team |
|---|---|
| 1st place, gold medalist(s) | South Africa |
| 2nd place, silver medalist(s) | Ghana |
| 3rd place, bronze medalist(s) | Kenya |
| 4 | Namibia |
| 5 | Zimbabwe |
| 6 | Nigeria |
| 7 | Tanzania |

=== America ===
| Rank | Team |
|---|---|
| 1st place, gold medalist(s) | United States |
| 2nd place, silver medalist(s) | Argentina |
| 3rd place, bronze medalist(s) | Canada |
| 4 | Chile |
| 5 | Uruguay |
| 6 | Mexico |
| 7 | Dominican Republic |
| 8 | Cuba |

=== Asia ===
| Rank | Team |
|---|---|
| 1st place, gold medalist(s) | South Korea |
| 2nd place, silver medalist(s) | China |
| 3rd place, bronze medalist(s) | India |
| 4 | Japan |
| 5 | Malaysia |
| 6 | Kazakhstan |
| 7 | Thailand |
| 8 | Hong Kong |

=== Europe ===
| Rank | Team |
|---|---|
| Gold medal | England as Great Britain |
| Silver medal | Netherlands |
| Bronze medal | Germany |
| 4 | Spain |
| 5 | Belgium |
| 6 | Scotland |
| 7 | Italy |
| 8 | Poland |

=== Oceania ===
| Rank | Team |
|---|---|
| Gold medal | Australia |
| Silver medal | New Zealand |
| Bronze medal | Samoa |

== 2014–15 World League Semifinals ==
| Qualified for the 2016 Summer Olympics |

| Rank | Valencia | Antwerp |
|---|---|---|
| 1 | Great Britain | Netherlands |
| 2 | China | South Korea |
| 3 | Germany | Australia |
| 4 | Argentina | New Zealand |
| 5 | United States | India |
| 6 | Spain | Japan |
| 7 | South Africa | Belgium |
| 8 | Ireland | Italy |
| 9 | Canada | Poland |
| 10 | Uruguay | France |
