= 1991 Women's Field Hockey Olympic Qualifier =

Tournament details
- Host country: New Zealand
- City: Auckland
- Dates: 12–26 October
- Teams: 12
- Venue: Lloyd Elsmore Hockey Stadium

Final positions
- Champions: Germany
- Runner-up: New Zealand
- Third place: Canada

Tournament statistics
- Matches played: 42
- Goals scored: 125 (2.98 per match)

The 1991 Women's Field Hockey Olympic Qualifier was held in Auckland, New Zealand with twelve teams took part in the competition.

== Results ==
=== Preliminary round ===
==== Pool A ====
Pos	Team	Pld	W	D	L	GF	GA	GD	Pts	Qualification
1	New Zealand (H)	5	4	0	1	10	4	+6	8	Advanced to Semi-finals
2	Germany	5	4	0	1	10	5	+5	8	Advanced to Semi-finals
3	South Korea	5	3	0	2	9	7	+2	6	
4	Japan	5	2	0	3	7	6	+1	4	
5	France	5	1	1	3	5	9	−4	3	
6	United States	5	0	1	4	3	13	−10	1	

Source: Todor66
Rules for classification: 1) Points; 2) Matches won; 3) Goal difference; 4) Goals for; 5) Head-to-head result.
(H) Hosts

12 October 1991

Germany	4–0	United States
	Report

12 October 1991

New Zealand	1–0	Japan
	Report

12 October 1991

France	0–1	South Korea
	Report

13 October 1991

South Korea	0–1	Germany
	Report

13 October 1991

New Zealand	2–0	France
	Report

13 October 1991

United States	0–2	Japan
	Report

16 October 1991

Germany	2–1	New Zealand
	Report

16 October 1991

Japan	1–2	France
	Report

16 October 1991

United States	1–3	South Korea
	Report

18 October 1991

Germany	3–1	France
	Report

18 October 1991

New Zealand	2–0	United States
	Report

18 October 1991

South Korea	3–1	Japan
	Report

20 October 1991

South Korea	2–4	New Zealand
	Report

20 October 1991

France	2–2	United States
	Report

20 October 1991

Japan	3–0	Germany
	Report

==== Pool B ====
Pos	Team	Pld	W	D	L	GF	GA	GD	Pts	Qualification
1	Great Britain	5	3	1	1	9	2	+7	7	Advanced to Semi-finals
2	Canada	5	3	1	1	9	6	+3	7	Advanced to Semi-finals
3	China	5	3	1	1	8	5	+3	7	
4	Argentina	5	3	0	2	9	3	+6	6	
5	Ireland	5	1	0	4	5	11	−6	2	
6	Italy	5	0	1	4	5	18	−13	1	

Source: Todor66
Rules for classification: 1) Points; 2) Matches won; 3) Goal difference; 4) Goals for; 5) Head-to-head result.

12 October 1991

China	1–2	Canada
	Report

12 October 1991

Great Britain	5–0	Italy
	Report

12 October 1991

Argentina	2–0	Ireland
	Report

13 October 1991

China	4–2	Italy
	Report

13 October 1991

Great Britain	0–2	Argentina
	Report

13 October 1991

Canada	3–2	Ireland
	Report

15 October 1991

Italy	2–2	Canada
	Report

15 October 1991

Argentina	0–1	China
	Report

15 October 1991

Ireland	0–3	Great Britain
	Report

18 October 1991

Italy	0–5	Argentina
	Report

18 October 1991

Canada	0–1	Great Britain
	Report

18 October 1991

China	2–1	Ireland
	Report

20 October 1991

Great Britain	0–0	China
	Report

20 October 1991

Canada	2–0	Argentina
	Report

20 October 1991

Ireland	2–1	Italy
	Report

=== Classification round ===
==== Ninth to twelfth place classification ====
Semi-finals
23 October 1991
France	3
Italy	1
23 October 1991
Ireland	–
United States	–

Final
24 October 1991
France	1
United States	6
Third Place
24 October 1991
Italy	1
Ireland	3

==== Fifth to eighth place classification ====
Semi-finals
22 October 1991
South Korea	4
Argentina	0
22 October 1991
China	0
Japan	1

Final
24 October 1991
South Korea	3
Japan	0
Third Place
24 October 1991
Argentina	1 (1)
China (pen.)	1 (3)

==== First to fourth place classification ====
Crossover
23 October 1991
New Zealand	1
Canada	0
23 October 1991
Great Britain	1
Germany	3

Fifth Place
26 October 1991
New Zealand	1 (2)
Germany (pen.)	1 (5)
Seventh Place
26 October 1991
Canada	3
Great Britain	1

== Final standings ==
As per statistical convention in field hockey, matches decided in extra time are counted as wins and losses, while matches decided by penalty shoot-outs are counted as draws.

Pos	Team	Pld	W	D	L	GF	GA	GD	Pts	Status
1st place, gold medalist(s)	Germany	7	5	1	1	14	7	+7	11	Qualified for 1992 Summer Olympics
2nd place, silver medalist(s)	New Zealand (H)	7	5	1	1	12	5	+7	11	Qualified for 1992 Summer Olympics
3rd place, bronze medalist(s)	Canada	7	4	1	2	12	8	+4	9	Qualified for 1992 Summer Olympics
4	Great Britain	7	3	1	3	11	8	+3	7	Qualified for 1992 Summer Olympics
5	South Korea	7	5	0	2	16	7	+9	10	Qualified for 1992 Summer Olympics
6	Japan	7	3	0	4	8	9	−1	6	
7	China	7	3	2	2	9	7	+2	8	
8	Argentina	7	3	1	3	10	8	+2	7	
9	United States	7	2	1	4	9	14	−5	5	
10	France	7	2	1	4	9	16	−7	5	
11	Ireland	7	2	0	5	8	12	−4	4	
12	Italy	7	0	1	6	7	24	−17	1	

Source: Field Hockey
(H) Hosts
