= Michelle Carey =

Michelle Carey may refer to

- Michelle Carey (athlete) (born 1981), Irish athlete
- Michelle Carey (field hockey) (born 1999), Irish field hockey player
