= Sofía Rogoski =

Spanish field hockey player (born 2005)

Personal information
- Full name: Sofía Belén Rogoski Curi
- Born: 1 December 1998 (age 27) Buenos Aires, Argentina

Sport
- Sport: Field hockey
- Position: Forward
Senior career
Years	Team	Caps	Goals
–	Atlètic Terrassa	-	-
National team
Years	Team	Caps	Goals
2025–	Spain	6	(3)
Medal record
Women's field hockey
Representing Spain

Sofía Belén Rogoski Curi (born 1 December 1998) is an Argentinian–born field hockey player from Spain.

== Personal life ==
Sofía Rogoski was born and raised in Buenos Aires, Argentina. She relocated to Santander, Spain, in 2020 to compete in the Liga Iberdrola.

== Field hockey ==
=== Domestic league ===
In the Spanish national league, the Liga Iberdrola, Rogoski represents Atlètic Terrassa. She has also previously represented UD Taburiente and Sardinero.

Prior to her move to Spain, Rogoski represented GEBA in the Argentinian National League, the Metropolitano de Hockey.

=== Red Sticks ===
After obtaining Spanish citizenship in 2024, Rogoski was eligible for national selection with the Red Sticks. She received her first call–up to the national squad in 2025 to participate in the 2024–25 FIH Pro League. She made her senior international debut during a match against China in Sydney.

== International goals ==
The following is a list of goals scored by Rogoski at international level.

Goal	Date	Location	Opponent	Score	Result	Competition	Ref.
1	8 February 2025	Sydney Olympic Park, Sydney, Australia	Australia	1–1	1–3	2024–25 FIH Pro League	
2	16 February 2025	Kalinga Stadium, Bhubaneswar, India	Germany	1–0	2–1	2024–25 FIH Pro League	
3	18 February 2025	Kalinga Stadium, Bhubaneswar, India	India	1–1	4–3	2024–25 FIH Pro League	
