= 2024 Women's EuroHockey Indoor Championship II =

Hockey competition

Tournament details
- Host country: Ireland
- City: Galway
- Dates: 9–11 February
- Teams: 6 (from 1 confederation)
- Venue: Kingfisher Club

Final positions
- Champions: Ireland (1st title)
- Runner-up: Lithuania
- Third place: Croatia

Tournament statistics
- Matches played: 15
- Goals scored: 104 (6.93 per match)
- Top scorer: (Lithuania) Dovile Kukliene (8 goals)
- Best player: (Ireland) Chloe Brown
- Best goalkeeper: (Slovakia) Daniela Sutovska

The 2024 Women's EuroHockey Indoor Championship II was the fifteenth edition of the Women's EuroHockey Indoor Championship II, the second level of the women's European indoor hockey championships organized by the European Hockey Federation. It took place from 9 to 11 February 2024 at the Kingfisher Club in Galway, Ireland.

== Qualified teams ==
Participating nations have qualified based on their final ranking from the 2022 competition.

Dates	Event	Location	Quotas	Qualifiers
24–26 January 2022	2022 EuroHockey Indoor Championship II	Ourense, Spain	2	Ireland
3–4 December 2022	2022 EuroHockey Indoor Championship III	Bratislava, Slovakia	2	Slovakia; Portugal
—N/a	New entry	—N/a	3	Croatia; Lithuania; Sweden
Total			6	

== Results ==
=== Standings ===
Pos	Team	Pld	W	D	L	GF	GA	GD	Pts	Promotion
1	Ireland (H, P)	5	4	1	0	31	10	+21	13	EuroHockey Indoor Championship
2	Lithuania (P)	5	4	0	1	20	8	+12	12	EuroHockey Indoor Championship
3	Croatia	5	3	0	2	21	16	+5	9	
4	Slovakia	5	1	2	2	14	18	−4	5	
5	Sweden	5	1	0	4	12	22	−10	3	
6	Portugal	5	0	1	4	6	30	−24	1	

Source: FIH
Rules for classification: 1) points; 2) matches won; 3) goal difference; 4) goals for; 5) head-to-head result; 6) field goals for.
(H) Hosts; (P) Promoted

=== Fixtures ===
9 February 2024
10:30

Slovakia	1–4	Croatia
Chebenova 36'	Report	Nizek 6', 19'; Bedenko 31'; Jelčić 39'

Umpires:
Katie Howie (SCO)
Teresa Ygeño (ESP)

9 February 2024
11:45

Portugal	0–6	Lithuania
	Report	Juraitė 5', 12', 21'; Kuklienė 17', 25'; Raulinaitytė 37'

Umpires:
Ellie Duffy (IRL)
Una Mihajlović (CRO)

9 February 2024
13:00

Ireland	7–2	Sweden
Brown 2', 33'; Power 3', 11'; McCarlie 16', 23'; Graham 22'	Report	von Blanquet 27', 40'

Umpires:
Alexandra Mahieu (BEL)
Ana Faias (POR)

9 February 2024
16:00

Slovakia	1–5	Lithuania
Medvikova 4'	Report	Bogdanova 10', 18'; Kuklienė 28'; Raulinaitytė 29', 39'

Umpires:
Ana Faias (POR)
Ellie Duffy (IRL)

9 February 2024
17:15

Sweden	5–0	Portugal
Thien 3', 32'; Justus 18'; Moberg 35' von Blanquet 40'	Report

Umpires:
Karolina Daukantaitė (LTU)
Una Mihajlović (CRO)

9 February 2024
18:30

Ireland	5–1	Croatia
Fulton 4', 33'; Brown 7'; Robinson 11'; Graham 37'	Report	Nizek 20'

Umpires:
Katie Howie (SCO)
Alexandra Mahieu (BEL)

10 February 2024
10:30

Sweden	1–4	Slovakia
Thien 13'	Report	Medvikova 19', 32'; Vyskočová 33'; Pucherova 40'

Umpires:
Alexandra Mahieu (BEL)
Teresa Ygeño (ESP)

10 February 2024
11:45

Lithuania	4–2	Croatia
Juraitė 5'; Kuklienė 6', 9'; Bogdanova 7'	Report	Nizek 12'; Peranić 23'

Umpires:
Ana Faias (POR)
Ellie Duffy (IRL)

10 February 2024
13:00

Portugal	1–9	Ireland
Nogueira 9'	Report	Brown 4'; Fox 7', 32'; Fulton 11', 24'; Patton 22', 40'; McCarlie 25'; Robinson 35'

Umpires:
Karolina Kaukantaitė (LTU)
Katie Howie (SCO)

10 February 2024
16:00

Lithuania	4–0	Sweden
Kuklienė 12', 18', 36'; Grigienė 25'	Report

Umpires:
Ellie Duffy (IRL)
Una Mihajlović (CRO)

10 February 2024
17:15

Croatia	7–2	Portugal
Hrupec 2'; Abramović 7', 17'; Jelčić 8', 19'; Bedenko 13'; Vajdić 40'	Report	Nogueira 15', 21'

Umpires:
Karolina Kaukantaitė (LTU)
Katie Howie (SCO)

10 February 2024
18:30

Slovakia	5–5	Ireland
Surinova 3'; Vyskočová 26'; Medvikova 28', 40'; Pucherova 36'	Report	Fox 4'; McCarlie 11'; Power 17', 40'; Graham 19'

Umpires:
Alexandra Mahieu (BEL)
Teresa Ygeño (ESP)

11 February 2024
09:00

Croatia	7–4	Sweden
Bedenko 12', 40'; Jelčić 13'; Nizek 19'; Petretić 20'; Hrupec 22'; Abramović 30'	Report	Schrader 17'; Moberg 29', 38'; Kalling-Smith 31'

Umpires:
Ana Faias (POR)
Teresa Ygeño (ESP)

11 February 2024
10:15

Portugal	3–3	Slovakia
Nogueira 8', 15'; Nunes 15'	Report	Pucherova 9'; Vyskočová 13', 39'

Umpires:
Karolina Kaukantaitė (LTU)
Ellie Duffy (IRL)

11 February 2024
11:30

Ireland	5–1	Lithuania
Fox 31', 39'; Brown 32', 35'; Fulton 34'	Report	Juraitė 20'

Umpires:
Katie Howie (SCO)
Una Mihajlović (CRO)

== See also ==
- 2024 Men's EuroHockey Indoor Championship II
- 2024 Women's EuroHockey Indoor Championship
