= Jette Fleschütz =

German field hockey player

Personal information
- Full name: Jette Louisa Fleschütz
- Born: 23 October 2002 (age 23) Hamburg, Germany

Sport
- Sport: Field hockey
- Position: Forward
- Club: Großflottbeker THGC
National team
Years	Team	Caps	Goals
2019	Germany U–18	15	(4)
2021–	Germany	8	(2)
Medal record
Women's field hockey
Representing Germany
European Championship
Silver medal – second place	2021 Amstelveen
Silver medal – second place	2025 Mönchengladbach
Bronze medal – third place	2023 Mönchengladbach

Jette Louisa Fleschütz (born 23 October 2002) is a German field hockey player, who plays as a forward.

She will represent Germany at the Games of the XXXII Olympiad.

== Career ==
=== Under–18 ===
Jette Fleschütz made her debut for the German U–18 team in 2019. Throughout the year she made 15 appearances and scored 4 goals.

=== Die Danas ===
In 2021, Fleschütz broke into the Die Danas squad for the first time. She made her first appearance for the national team during an FIH Pro League match against the Netherlands in Amsterdam. On May 27, national coach Xavier Reckinger named the Die Danas squad for the Summer Olympics in Tokyo. Fleschütz will make her Olympic debut at the games, being a surprise addition to the squad.
