= Niamh Carey =

Irish field hockey player (born 1999)

Personal information
- Born: 14 June 1999 (age 27) Dublin, Ireland

Sport
- Sport: Field hockey
- Position: Forward
- Club: UCD
National team
Years	Team	Caps	Goals
2019–	Ireland U–21	9	(0)
2021–	Ireland	23	(7)
Medal record
Women's field hockey
Representing Ireland
FIH Nations Cup
Silver medal – second place	2023–24 Terrassa

Niamh Carey (born 5 May 1999) is an Irish field hockey player.

== Personal life ==
Niamh Carey was born and raised in Dublin, Ireland. Her twin sister, Michelle, also plays field hockey for Ireland.

She is an alumna of University College Dublin.

== Career ==
=== National league ===
In the Irish Hockey League, Carey plays for UCD.

=== Under–21 ===
Carey made her international debut at under–21 level. She was a member of the Irish U–21 side during a Four–Nations Tournament in Dublin. She also appeared at the EuroHockey Junior Championship in Valencia, where the team finished in seventh place.

=== Senior squad ===
In 2021 Carey made her senior international debut for the Green Army. Her first appearance was during the European Qualifier for the FIH World Cup in Pisa.

Since her debut, Carey has been a constant inclusion in the senior national team. Her most recent appearance was during the 2024 FIH Olympic Qualifiers in Valencia.

==== International goals ====
Goal	Date	Location	Opponent	Score	Result	Competition	Ref.
1	21 October 2021	CUS Pisa, Pisa, Italy	France	4–1	4–1	2022 FIH World Cup European Qualifier	
2	23 October 2021	CUS Pisa, Pisa, Italy	Belarus	3–2	3–2	2022 FIH World Cup European Qualifier	
3	21 August 2022	National Sports Campus, Dublin, Ireland	Turkey	4–0	7–0	2023 EuroHockey Championship Qualifier	
4	17 December 2022	Estadio Beteró, Valencia, Spain	Japan	2–1	2–3	2022 FIH Nations Cup	
5	27 July 2023	National Sports Campus, Dublin, Ireland	Chile	3–3	3–3	Test Match	
6	19 August 2023	SparkassenPark, Mönchengladbach, Germany	Scotland	3–0	5–0	2023 EuroHockey Championship	
7	15 January 2024	Estadio Beteró, Valencia, Spain	Ukraine	2–0	8–0	2024 FIH Olympic Qualifiers	
