= Jacques Paloume =

The Jacques Paloumé is a field hockey tournament and festival hosted by three European hockey clubs.

An informal tournament was held in 1949. The tournament was first hosted in 1950, in Dieppe by East Grinstead. In 1951, the tournament was hosted in Rouen, France. In 1954, Gross Flottbek, a hockey team from Hamburg, Germany, hosted the tournament for first time.

The tournament's location rotates each year between Rouen (France), Gross Flottbek (Hamburg, Germany) and East Grinstead (Sussex, England). These three clubs compete for the Jacques Paloume trophy.

== Format ==
Each year, the Jacques Paloumé takes place over four days, Friday through Monday. Participants arrive on Friday to start to celebrate. Hockey is played during the day on Saturday with a party hosted in a different location in the evening. Hockey is also played during the day on Sunday; there is a gala dinner and presentations in the evening in a different location. The participants leave the next day on Monday.
