= Sarah McAuley (field hockey) =

Irish field hockey player (born 2001)

Personal information
- Full name: Sarah McAuley
- National team: Ireland
- Born: 25 September 2001 (age 25) Blackrock, Dublin

Sport
- Sport: Field hockey
- College team: University College Dublin
- Club: KHC Dragons

Sarah McAuley (born 25 September 2001) is an Irish field hockey player. She competed in the 2020 Summer Olympics.

== Career ==
McAuley plays hockey for Belgian club KHC Dragons she joined the Belgian side in 2025, and represented Ireland at the 2020 Olympics in Tokyo and 2022 and 2026 World Cups.

McAuley was awarded Young Player of the Tournament at the 2022 Hockey Nations Cup in Spain.

=== International Goals ===
Goal	Date	Location	Opponent	Score	Result	Competition
1	24 August 2023	Mönchengladbach, Germany	Spain	1–0	2–2	2023 EuroHockey Championship
2	2 March 2026	Santiago, Chile	Malaysia	3–0	5–0	2026 FIH Hockey World Cup Qualifiers
3	18 June 2026	Hazelaarweg Stadion, Rotterdam	Spain	3–0	3–1	2025–26 FIH Pro League
