= Jessica McMaster =

Irish field hockey player

Personal information
- Born: 27 March 1998 (age 28) Belfast, Northern Ireland

Sport
- Sport: Field hockey
- Position: Midfield
Senior career
| Years | Team | Caps | Goals |
| –2016 | Ulster Elks | - | - |
| 2016–2021 | Queen's University | - | - |
| 2021– | Ulster Elks | - | - |
National team
| Years | Team | Caps | Goals |
| 2015–2016 | Ireland U–18 | 8 | (1) |
| 2016– | Ireland | 11 | (2) |
| 2017–2019 | Ireland U–21 | 10 | (1) |
Medal record
Women's field hockey
Representing Ireland

Jessica McMaster (born 27 March 1998) is a field hockey player from Ireland.

== Education ==
She is a former student of Belfast High School and Queen's University.

== Career ==
=== Domestic league ===
McMaster currently competes in the EY Hockey League, the premier domestic competition hosted by Hockey Ireland. In the league, she represents the Ulster Elks. She also previously competed for Queen's University during her time as a student.

=== Under–18 ===
Throughout 2015 and 2016, McMaster represented the Ireland national youth squad in under–18 competitions. She competed with the team at the 2015 EuroHockey U–18 Championship II in Mori, as well as the 2016 EuroHockey U–18 Championship in Cork.

=== Under–21 ===
McMaster also represented the Ireland U–21 from 2017 to 2019. She appeared at two editions of the EuroHockey U–21 Championship in 2017 and 2019, both of which were held in Valencia.

=== Green Army ===
She made her international debut for the Green Army in 2016, earning her first senior cap during a test match against Scotland in Glasgow. Following her debut, she made six more appearances for the national squad throughout 2017.

After an eight-year absence, McMaster returned to the national squad in 2025, travelling to the United States for a test series.

She has been named in the squad for the seventh season of the FIH Pro League.
