= Yani Zhong =

German field hockey player

Personal information
- Born: 14 March 2001 (age 25) Hamburg, Germany

Sport
- Sport: Field hockey
- Position: Forward
Senior career
Years	Team	Caps	Goals
–2024	Uhlenhorster HC	-	-
2024–2025	Boston College Eagles	-	-
2025–	Uhlenhorster HC	-	-
National team
Years	Team	Caps	Goals
2018	Germany U–18	5	(0)
2022–	Germany	5	(0)
Medal record
Women's field hockey
Representing Germany

Yani Zhong (born 14 March 2001) is a field hockey player from Germany.

== Personal life ==
Yani Zhong was born in Hamburg, Germany.

She is a former student of Boston College, having graduated in 2024.

== Career ==
=== Domestic league ===
Throughout her junior career, Zhong played for Uhlenhorster HC. She later moved to the United States and competed for the Boston College Eagles in the Atlantic Coast Conference. In 2025 she returned to Germany, playing for Uhlenhorster HC again in the Bundesliga.

=== Under–18 ===
In 2018, Zhong made her international debut for Germany at under–18 level, representing the national youth squad at the EuroHockey U–18 Championship in Santander. At the tournament, the team finished in fourth place, narrowly missing a bronze medal.

=== Die Danas ===
Zhong made her senior international debut in 2022. She earned her first cap during season three of the FIH Pro League, in a match against China in s'-Hertogenbosch.

Following her debut, Zhong was not included in the Die Danas squad for over three years. She returned to the national setup in 2025, travelling with the national team to Santiago del Estero for matches of the FIH Pro League's seventh season. She has since been named in the squad in 2026 for more FIH Pro League matches in Valencia.
