= Alexia 't Serstevens =

Belgian field hockey player

Personal information
- Born: 9 November 1999 (age 26) Belgium

Sport
- Sport: Field hockey
- Position: Forward
- Club: Waterloo Ducks
National team
Years	Team	Caps	Goals
2016	Belgium U–18	5	(2)
2018–	Belgium	14	(1)
Medal record
Women's field hockey
Representing Belgium

Alexia 't Serstevens (born 9 November 1999) is a field hockey player from Belgium, who plays as a forward.

== Career ==
=== Club hockey ===
In the Belgian Hockey League, 'T Serstevens plays club hockey for the Waterloo Ducks.

=== National teams ===
==== Under–18 ====
In 2016, Alexia 't Serstevens made her debut for the Belgium U–18 team at the EuroHockey Youth Championship in Cork.

==== Red Panthers ====
'T Serstevens made her debut for the Belgium 'Red Panthers' in 2018 during a test series against Chile in Brussels.

During the inaugural tournament of the FIH Pro League in 2019, 't Serstevens was a member of the Belgian side that finished in fifth place.
