= Johanna Hachenberg =

German field hockey player

Personal information
- Born: 2 May 2006 (age 20) Germany

Sport
- Sport: Field hockey
- Position: Forward
- Club: Club an der Alster
National team
Years	Team	Caps	Goals
2023–2024	Germany U–18	6	(1)
2025–	Germany	16	(7)
Medal record
Women's field hockey
Representing Germany
EuroHockey Championship
Silver medal – second place	2025 Mönchengladbach
EuroHockey U–18 Championship
Gold medal – first place	2023 Krefeld

Johanna Hachenberg (born 2 May 2006) is a field hockey player from Germany.

== Field hockey ==
=== Domestic league ===
Hachenberg currently competes in the German Bundesliga, where she plays for Club an der Alster.

=== Under–18 ===
Hachenberg made her international debut at under–18 level. She received her first call-up to the national U–18 squad in 2021. Two years later, in 2023, she was a member of the squad that won a gold medal at the EuroHockey U–18 Championship, held in Krefeld.

=== Die Danas ===
Hachenberg was called into the squad of Die Danas in 2024. She made her senior international debut during the sixth season of the FIH Pro League, earning her first cap in a match against Argentina in Santiago del Estero. Throughout the season she made more appearances for the side, scoring four goals in the process.

In 2025 she was named in the squad for the 2025 EuroHockey Championship in Mönchengladbach.

== International goals ==
The following table lists all goals scored by Hachenberg at international level.

Goal	Date	Location	Opponent	Score	Result	Event	Ref
1	21 February 2025	Kalinga Stadium, Bhubaneswar, India	India	4–0	4–0	2024–25 FIH Pro League	
2	14 June 2025	Wilrijkse Plein, Antwerp, Belgium	Belgium	2–2	2–4	2024–25 FIH Pro League	
3	21 June 2025	Ernst-Reuter Sportfeld, Berlin, Germany	Australia	2–0	4–0	2024–25 FIH Pro League	
4	24 June 2025	Ernst-Reuter Sportfeld, Berlin, Germany	China	1–0	2–3	2024–25 FIH Pro League	
5	25 July 2025	Wiesbadener Tennis und Hockeyclub, Wiesbaden, Germany	South Korea	1–0	4–1	Test Match	
6	25 July 2025	Wiesbadener Tennis und Hockeyclub, Wiesbaden, Germany	South Korea	2–0	4–1	Test Match	
7	27 July 2025	Wiesbadener Tennis und Hockeyclub, Wiesbaden, Germany	South Korea	2–0	4–0	Test Match	
