= Mikayla Power =

Irish field hockey player

Personal information
- Full name: Mikayla Nicole Power
- Born: 17 January 2005 (age 21) Dublin, Ireland

Sport
- Sport: Field hockey
- Position: Forward
- Club: University College Dublin
National team
Years	Team	Caps	Goals
2021–	Ireland Indoor	27	(10)
2022–	Ireland U–21	15	(0)
2025–	Ireland	5	(2)
Medal record
Women's field hockey
Representing Ireland
Women's FIH Hockey Nations Cup
Silver medal – second place	2025 Santiago
EuroHockey Indoor Championship II
Gold medal – first place	2024 Galway

Mikayla Nicole Power (born 17 January 2005) is a field and indoor hockey player from Ireland.

== Personal life ==
Mikayla Power was born and raised in Dublin, Ireland. She is the daughter of former international umpire, Carol Metchette.

== Indoor hockey ==
Power debuted on the international scene in the indoor game. She made her senior international debut for the Irish Indoor team in 2021, during a test series against Scotland in Antrim. Since her debut, she has represented the indoor squad on numerous occasions.

Tournament History

- 2022 EuroHockey Indoor Championship II – Ourense.
- 2023 Nkosi Cup – Cape Town.
- 2024 EuroHockey Indoor Championship II – Galway.

== Field hockey ==
=== Domestic league ===
In the Irish Hockey League, Power represents University College Dublin.

=== Under–21 ===
Power made her junior international debut in 2022. She made her first appearances for the Irish U–21 team at the FIH Junior World Cup in Potchefstroom. She was not named in the initial squad, however after the postponement of the tournament due to the COVID-19 pandemic, Power was called into the squad. Later that year she represented the team again, competing at the EuroHockey U21 Championship in Ghent.

In 2024 she was a member of the junior squad at her second EuroHockey U21 Championship, held in Terrassa.

=== Senior national team ===
Following successful club and junior national squad appearances, Power received her first call–up to the senior national team in 2025. She made her senior international debut at the 2024–25 FIH Nations Cup in Santiago, marking the occasion with a goal on debut.

== International goals ==
The following is a list of goals scored by Power at international level in field hockey.

Goal	Date	Location	Opponent	Score	Result	Competition	Ref.
1	23 February 2025	Centro Deportivo de Hockey Césped Estadio Nacional, Santiago, Chile	Scotland	1–0	3–0	2024–25 FIH Nations Cup	
2	27 February 2025	Centro Deportivo de Hockey Césped Estadio Nacional, Santiago, Chile	South Korea	2–0	2–0	2024–25 FIH Nations Cup	
