= Lisa Nolte =

German field hockey player

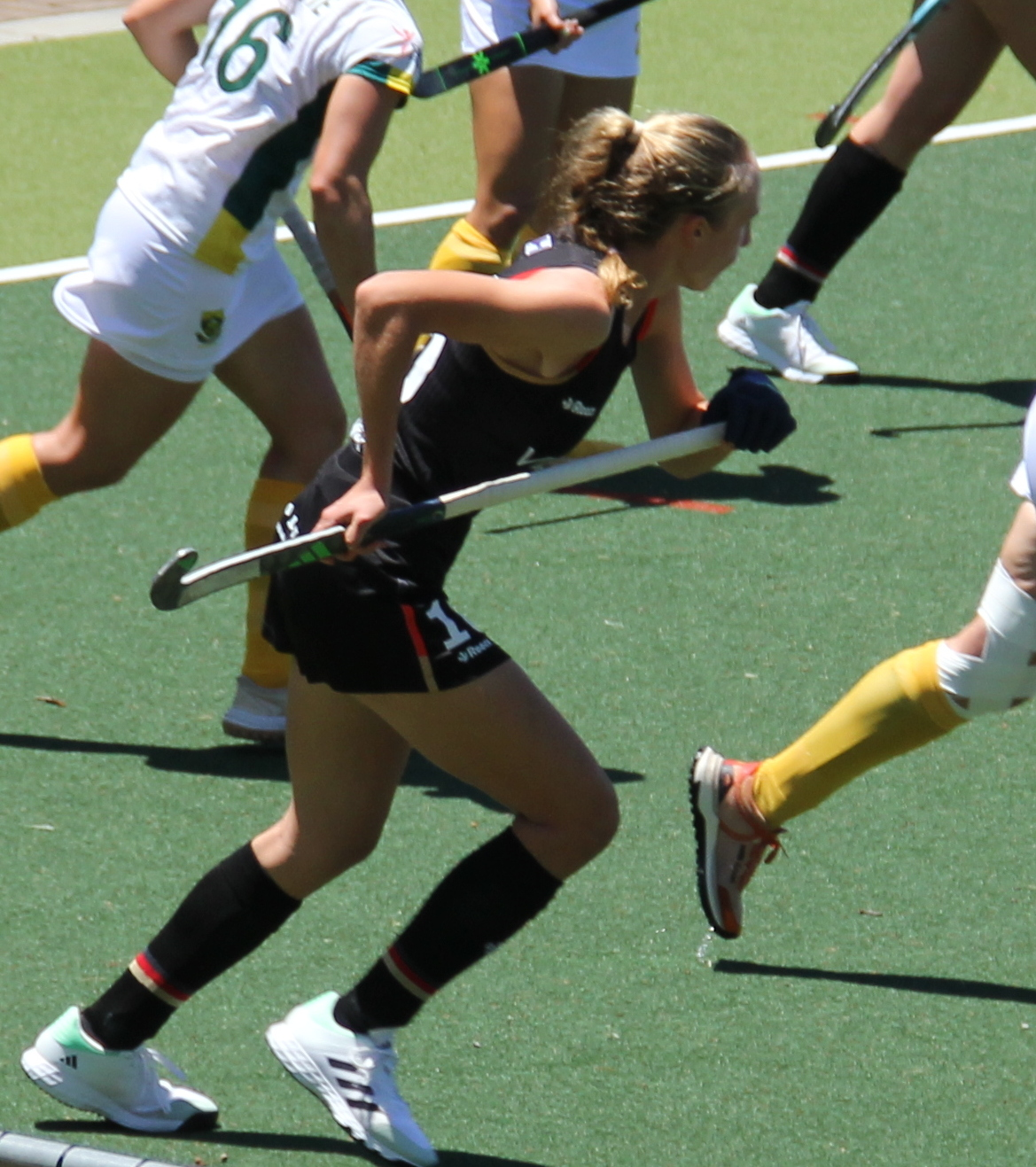
- Test field hockey: South Africa v Germany 26 November 2023

Personal information
- Full name: Lisa Marie Nolte
- Born: 5 February 2001 (age 25)

Sport
- Sport: Field hockey
- Position: Midfield
- Club: Düsseldorfer HC
National team
Years	Team	Caps	Goals
2019–	Germany U–21	12	(2)
2019–	Germany	7	(0)
Medal record
Women's field hockey
Representing Germany
EuroHockey Championship
Silver medal – second place	2025 Mönchengladbach
Bronze medal – third place	2023 Mönchengladbach
EuroHockey Junior Championship
Bronze medal – third place	2019 Valencia

Lisa Marie Nolte (born 5 February 2001) is a German field hockey player.

== Career ==
=== Club level ===
In club competition, Nolte plays for Düsseldorfer HC in the German Bundesliga.

=== Junior national team ===
Lisa Nolte made her debut for the German U–21 team in 2019. Her first appearance was during a three nations series Mönchengladbach and Viersen. Later that year, she went on to win a bronze medal with the team at the EuroHockey Junior Championship in Valencia.

In 2022, Nolte was named captain of the junior squad for the postponed FIH Junior World Cup in Potchefstroom.

=== Die Danas ===
Nolte made her debut for Die Danas in 2019, during a test series against Argentina in Buenos Aires.

She has since gone on to represent Germany in the FIH Pro League.
