= Felicia Wiedermann =

German field hockey player

Personal information
- Born: 28 January 2002 (age 24) Germany

Sport
- Sport: Field hockey
- Position: Midfield
- Club: Club an der Alster
National team
Years	Team	Caps	Goals
2022–	Germany	2	(1)
2022–	Germany U–21	0	(0)
Medal record
Women's field hockey
Representing Germany
EuroHockey Championship
Silver medal – second place	2025 Mönchengladbach
EuroHockey Youth Championship
Gold medal – first place	2021 Valencia

Felicia Wiedermann (born 28 January 2002) is a German field hockey player.

== Career ==
=== Club level ===
In club competition, Wiedermann plays for Club an der Alster in the German Bundesliga.

=== National teams ===
==== Under–18 ====
Felicia Wiedermann made her international debut for Germany at U–18 level. She represented the team at the 2021 edition of the EuroHockey Youth Championship in Valencia.

==== Under–21 ====
In 2022, Wiedermann was named in the German U–21 squad for the FIH Junior World Cup in Potchefstroom.

==== Die Danas ====
Wiedermann made her senior debut for Die Danas in 2022. Her first appearance was during season three of the FIH Pro League, in Germany's away matches against India. In the second match, she scored her first international goal.

=== International goals ===
Goal	Date	Location	Opponent	Score	Result	Competition	Ref.
1	13 March 2022	Kalinga Stadium, Bhubaneswar, India	India	1–0	1–1 (0–3)	2021–22 FIH Pro League	
