= Ellen Curran =

Irish field hockey player

Personal information
- Full name: Ellen Louise Curran
- Born: 4 March 1998 (age 28) Dublin, Ireland

Sport
- Sport: Field hockey
- Position: Midfield
Senior career
Years	Team	Caps	Goals
–2017	Hermes Monkstown	-	-
2018–2022	UCD	-	-
2022–2024	Pembroke Wanderers	-	-
2024–	Waterloo Ducks	-	-
National team
Years	Team	Caps	Goals
2015–2016	Ireland U–18	9	(2)
2016–	Ireland	73	(5)
2017–2019	Ireland U–21	12	(0)
Medal record
Women's field hockey
Representing Ireland
FIH Nations Cup
Silver medal – second place	2023–24 Terrassa
Silver medal – second place	2024–25 Santiago

Ellen Louise Curran (born 4 March 1998) is a field hockey player from Ireland.

== Education ==
She is an alum of University College Dublin, where she completed a degree in Biomedical Engineering.

== Career ==
=== Domestic league ===
Curran currently competes in the Carlsberg 0.0 Hockey League in Belgium, where she represents the Waterloo Ducks.

Prior to her move to Belgium, she played for multiple clubs in the Irish Hockey League. Throughout her career in Ireland, she represented Hermes Monkstown, UCD and the Pembroke Wanderers.

=== Under–18 ===
Throughout 2015 and 2016, Curran represented the Ireland national youth squad in under–18 competitions. She competed with the team at the 2015 EuroHockey U–18 Championship II in Mori, as well as the 2016 EuroHockey U–18 Championship in Cork.

=== Under–21 ===
Curran also represented the Ireland U–21 from 2017 to 2019. She appeared at two editions of the EuroHockey U–21 Championship in 2017 and 2019, both of which were held in Valencia.

=== Green Army ===
She made her international debut for the Green Army in 2016, earning her first senior cap during a test match against Scotland in Glasgow.

Throughout her international career she has medalled twice, taking home silver at the 2023–24 and 2024–25 editions of the FIH Nations Cup held in Terrassa and Santiago, respectively.

Major Tournaments

She has also represented Ireland at multiple major competitions, including:

- 2022 FIH World Cup Qualifiers – Pisa
- 2022 FIH World Cup – Terrassa and Amsterdam
- 2023 EuroHockey Championship Qualifiers – Dublin
- 2022 FIH Nations Cup – Valencia
- 2023 EuroHockey Championship – Mönchengladbach
- 2024 FIH Olympic Qualifiers – Valencia
- 2023–24 FIH Nations Cup – Terrassa
- 2024–25 FIH Nations Cup – Santiago
- 2025 EuroHockey Championship – Mönchengladbach
