= Hannah Irwin =

Northern Irish athlete

Personal information
- Nationality: Northern Ireland
- Born: 23 June 1998 (age 28)

Sport
- Sport: Athletics
- Event: Long-distance running

Achievements and titles
- Personal bests: 1500m: 4:22.93 (Cardiff, 2024); 3000m 9:11:98 (Watford, 2023); 5000m 15:24.71 (Tonypandy, 2025); 10,000m 32:25.34 (London, 2022); 5km (road): 15:27 (Battersea, 2026); 10km (road): 31:32 (Valencia, 2026); Half-marathon 1:10:49 (Valencia, 2024)

Hannah Irwin (born 23 June 1998) is a British long-distance runner. She competed at the 2022 Commonwealth Games over 10,000m representing Northern Ireland. That year, she set a new Northern Irish national record for the 10,000m. In 2023, she set a new Northern Irish national record for the half marathon.

== Early life ==
From Cambridge, Irwin studied English with Creative Writing at Surrey University, and writes poetry in her spare time. Irwin recovered from an anaemia diagnosis in 2017. In 2020 Irwin wrote about overcoming problems with disordered eating when she was younger.

== Career ==
Irwin made her British debut in June 2022 at the European 10,000m Cup, where the British team came home with a bronze medal. Prior to that, Irwin had run a new personal best and set a new Northern Ireland record of 32:25.34 for the 10,000m competing at the Night of the 10,000m PBs at Parliament Hill in May 2022. In June 2022, Irwin set a new 5000m personal best of 15:45.87 at the Woodside Stadium in Watford. Irwin was selected as path of the Northern Ireland squad for the 2022 Commonwealth Games held in Birmingham, England. However, she did not finish the 10,000m race at the event. She was later diagnosed with a metatarsal fracture which prevented her competing for several months. In August 2023, she broke the Northern Irish national record for the half marathon, running 1:11:05 in County Antrim.

She was selected for the Half Marathon race at the 2025 European Running Championships in April 2025 in Leuven, Belgium. Competing at the championships on 12 April 2025, she finished in sixteenth place in a time of 73:54. On 31 December 2025, Irwin ran a 15:27 personal best on the road at the Battersea 5K, placing second. Competing in Valencia on 11 January 2026, Irwin lowered the Northern Ireland record for the 10 km, with a time of 31:32.

Irwin placed third in the British national 10,000 metres championship race in Loughborough on 17 May 2026, behind Izzy Fry and Poppy Tank. In October, Irwin won the Great South Run in Portsmouth, beating defending champion Verity Ockenden by three seconds. With the win, Irwin became the 2026 UK 10-mile champion.
