= Holly Hunt =

American designer

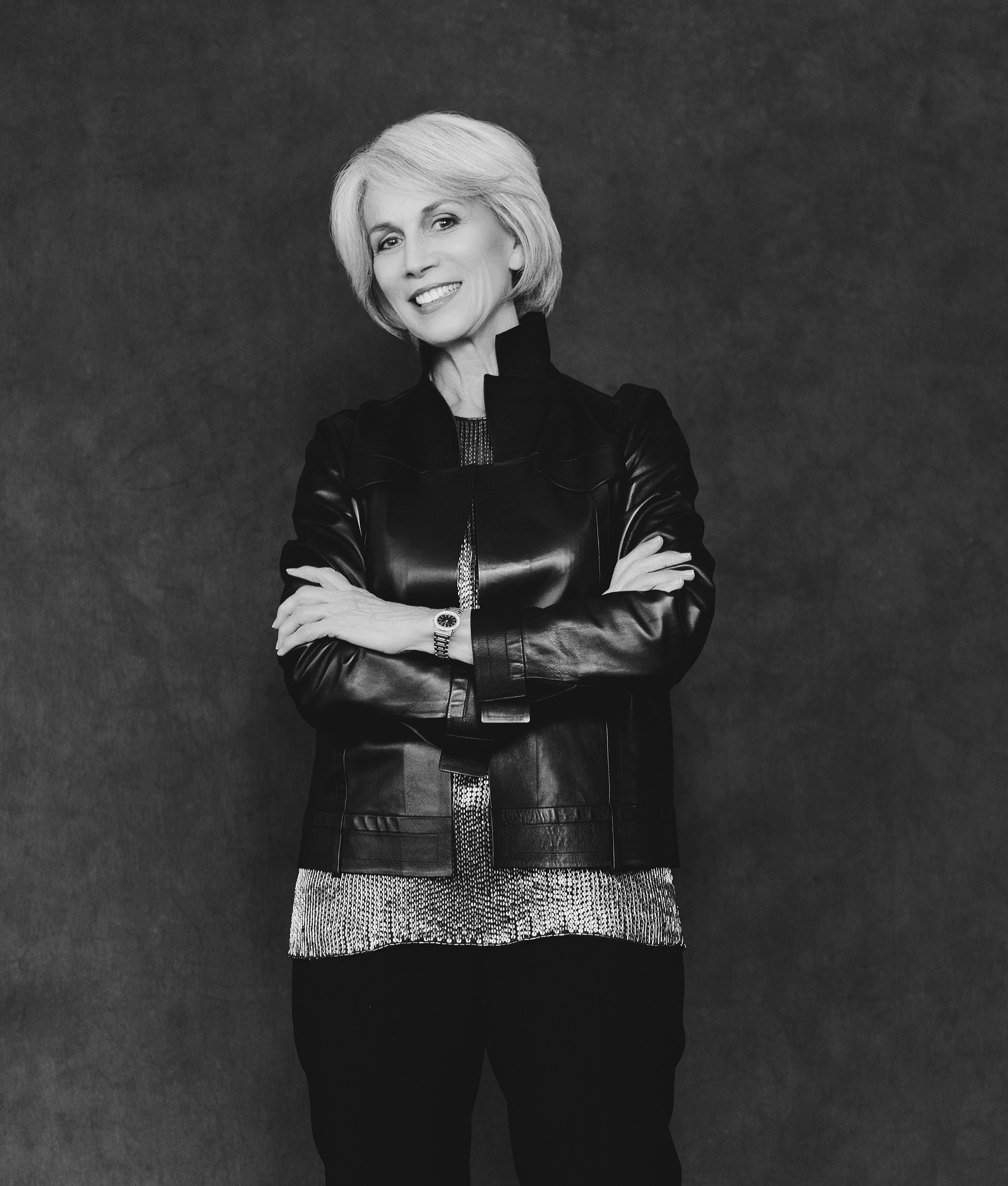
- Holly Hunt, 2015
- Born: West Texas, U.S.
- Education: Texas Tech University
- Occupation: Designer
- Website: hollyhunt.com millerknoll.com

Holly Hunt is an American designer. She is the founder and CEO of Holly Hunt Design (now a subsidiary MillerKnoll, Inc.), a company that designs, produces and showcases custom made product including indoor and outdoor furniture, lighting, rugs, textiles and leathers.

== Early life and education ==
Born and raised in West Texas, Hunt's childhood aspirations were to be involved in fashion design. After graduating from Texas Tech, she completed an executive training program at Foley's in Houston, a now defunct department store once owned by Federated Department Stores (now known as Macy's). With her interests still in designing, she moved to New York City in the early 1970s to become a design assistant for the president of a costume jewelry firm.

== Career ==
In 1983, Hunt bought a small showroom in Chicago's Merchandise Mart and changed the name almost a year later, becoming the first HOLLY HUNT showroom. Over the last 30 years, the HOLLY HUNT brand has opened 10 more showrooms across the United States, as well as the recent opening of a London showroom.

In 2014, Hunt sold the company, Holly Hunt Design to Knoll, Inc. for a reported $95 million. She remains with the company, acting as its CEO.

Hunt was given the "Timeless Design Award" by The Royal Oak Foundation in London, and has been recognized by industry groups such as the International Interior Design Association and Cottages & Gardens magazine. She has also been honored by her alma mater with their annual "Distinguished Leadership Award" in 2012.
