= Lynn Krings =

German field hockey player (born 2005)

Personal information
- Born: 28 March 2005 (age 21) Germany

Sport
- Sport: Field hockey
- Position: Forward
Senior career
Years	Team	Caps	Goals
–2023	Crefelder THC	-	-
2023–	Rot-Weiss Köln	-	-
National team
Years	Team	Caps	Goals
2024–	Germany U–21	5	(5)
2024–	Germany	4	(1)
Medal record
Women's field hockey
Representing Germany
EuroHockey U–18 Championship
Gold medal – first place	2023 Krefeld

Lynn Krings (born 28 March 2005) is a field hockey player from Germany.

== Career ==
=== Domestic leagues ===
In the German Bundesliga and the Euro Hockey Leagues, Krings represents Rot-Weiss Köln. She has also previously played for Crefelder THC.

=== Under–18 ===
In 2023, Krings was a member of the German U–18 team that won gold at the EuroHockey U–18 Championship in Krefeld.

=== Under–21 ===
Krings made her debut for the German U–21 team in 2024. She was named in the national junior squad to compete at the EuroHockey U–21 Championship held in Terrassa. She helped the team to a fourth place finish, and completed the tournament as Germany's top scorer with 5 goals.

=== Die Danas ===
Following her outstanding junior performances in 2024, Krings was included in the senior national squad for the first time later that year. She was named in the team to travel to Santiago del Estero for Germany's first away leg of the 2024–25 FIH Pro League. She made her senior international debut for Die Danas in a match Argentina, marking the occasion with a goal.

== International goals ==
The following is a list of goals scored by Schwabe at international level.

Goal	Date	Location	Opponent	Score	Result	Competition	Ref.
1	10 December 2024	Polideportivo Provincial, Santiago del Estero, Argentina	Argentina	1–1	2–2	2024–25 FIH Pro League	
