= RTHC Bayer Leverkusen =

Sports club in Leverkusen, Germany

Coordinates: 51°01′05″N 7°00′23″E

Logo

Ruder Tennis Hockey Club Bayer Leverkusen (RTHC Bayer Leverkusen e.V.) is a German rowing, field hockey and tennis club, one of the projects supported by Bayer AG and with 2500 members, it is additionally one of the largest sports clubs in Leverkusen.

To take care of the number of athletes, the club has 18 full-time employees and 20 coaches and trainers. The sports facilities of RTHC Bayer Leverkusen are at three locations. The quarters of the rowing department is located on the Rhine in Köln-Stammheim, at Stammheim Castle Park on Fühlinger lake.

The central sports and administrative center of the RTHC is on the Kurtekotten dar. Around the clubhouse are 26 outdoor tennis courts, a tennis wall, two tennis indoor halls with a total of seven courts and a multipurpose hall with a gym. For the sport of hockey, there are two artificial and natural turf fields and a hall.

RTHC was created in 1951 by the merger of three formerly independent organizations: the rowing club founded in 1910, the tennis clubs of 1913 and the hockey club in 1919.

As of April 2012, the outstanding successes of its members include two Olympic gold medals (Barcelona 1992, Atlanta 1996), seven Olympic silver medals, one bronze and seven world championship titles. The most successful rower is Stephan Volkert. The multiple Paralympic swimming champion, Dr. Britta Siegers rose to success with wheelchair tennis and occupied as a personal best in the world ranking position eight in singles and position seven in doubles.

== Rowing honours ==
=== Henley Royal Regatta ===
Year	Winning crew
2016	Britannia Challenge Cup
