= German Hockey Federation =

German federation of field and indoor hockey

German Hockey Federation Deutscher Hockey-Bund
- Sport: Field Hockey
- Jurisdiction: German
- Membership: 66,145
- Abbreviation: DHB
- Founded: 1909
- Affiliation: FIH
- Regional affiliation: Europe (EHF)
- Headquarters: Am Hockeypark 1, 41179, Mönchengladbach
- President: Henning Fastrich

Official website
- hockey.de

The German Hockey Federation (German: Deutscher Hockey-Bund or DHB) is the national governing body for field (and indoor) hockey in Germany. It was founded in 1909 in Bonn. It is situated in Mönchengladbach and had 66,145 members on 1 January 2006. The body is built by the club which are organised in subdivisions on the level of the Bundesländer. The association itself is member of the DOSB (Deutscher Olympischer Sportbund), the EHF and the FIH. It is responsible for the German national hockey teams and is the administrator of the Men's Bundesliga and Women's Bundesliga

== History ==
The German Hockey Federation was founded on 31 December 1909 in Bonn as part of an international hockey week in Bonn by a number of clubs founded from 1901 onwards. Kurt Doerry was elected the first President.

== See also ==
- Germany men's national field hockey team
- Germany women's national field hockey team
- Men's Bundesliga
- Women's Bundesliga
