= Grossflottbeker THGC =

Logo

Grossflottbeker Tennis Hockey and Golf Club (GTHGC) is a tennis, field hockey and golf club based in Hamburg, Germany.

The club was founded on 1 July 1901 as a tennis club. Ten years later, a hockey club was founded and in 1937 a golf club was added. The club currently has approximately 2,000 members.

Grossflottbeker Hockey Club won several tournaments in the past and the Ladies Team were very successful in the 1960s and 1970s, winning four national titles. In 1978 the women even reached the final of the EuroHockey Club Champions Cup.

The hockey club hosts the Jacques Paloume tournament every three years.

== Honours ==
=== Women ===
Bundesliga: 4

- 1965–66, 1969–70, 1976–77, 1978–79

German national title indoor hockey: 2

- 1966, 1972
