= Candela Mejías =

Spanish field hockey player (born 1997)

Candela Mejías Zanetti
Personal information
- Nationality: Spain
- Born: 27 January 1997 (age 29)

Sport
- Sport: Field hockey
Medal record
EuroHockey Championship
Bronze medal – third place	2025 Mönchengladbach

Candela Zanetti Mejías is a Spanish field hockey player. She competed in the 2020 Summer Olympics.
