= Germany women's national field hockey team =

Germany
- Nickname(s): Die Danas
- Association: Deutscher Hockey-Bund (German Hockey Federation)
- Confederation: EHF (Europe)
- Head Coach: n/a
- Assistant coach(es): Felix Fischer; Dominic Giskes; James Lewis; Maximilian Wagner
- Manager: Fabian Schuler
- Captain: Lisa Nolte; Linnea Weidemann
Home	Away

FIH ranking
- Current: 6 (3 October 2026)

Olympic Games
- Appearances: 11 (first in 1984)
- Best result: (gold) 1st (2004)

World Cup
- Appearances: 16 (first in 1974)
- Best result: (gold) 1st (1976, 1981)

EuroHockey Championship
- Appearances: 17 (first in 1984)
- Best result: (gold) 1st (2007, 2013)

The Germany women's national field hockey team has represented the unified Germany since 1991.

The team won the gold medal at the 2004 Summer Olympics in Athens, Greece, by defeating the Netherlands in the final.

== Tournament records ==
World Cup
Year	Host city	Position
1974	Mandelieu, France	3rd
1976	West Berlin, West Germany	1st
1978	Madrid, Spain	2nd
1981	Buenos Aires, Argentina	1st
1983	Kuala Lumpur, Malaysia	4th
1986	Amsterdam, Netherlands	2nd
1990	Sydney, Australia	8th
1994	(Republic of Ireland) Dublin, Ireland	4th
1998	Utrecht, Netherlands	3rd
2002	Perth, Australia	7th
2006	Madrid, Spain	8th
2010	Rosario, Argentina	4th
2014	The Hague, Netherlands	8th
2018	London, England	5th
2022	Terrassa, Spain & Amstelveen, Netherlands	4th
2026	Wavre, Belgium & Amstelveen, Netherlands	6th

European Championships
Year	Host city	Position
1984	Lille, France	3rd
1987	London, England	4th
1991	Brussels, Belgium	2nd
1995	Amsterdam, Netherlands	3rd
1999	Cologne, Germany	2nd
2003	Barcelona, Spain	3rd
2005	(Republic of Ireland) Dublin, Ireland	2nd
2007	Manchester, England	1st
2009	Amsterdam, Netherlands	2nd
2011	Mönchengladbach, Germany	2nd
2013	Boom, Belgium	1st
2015	London, England	3rd
2017	Amsterdam, Netherlands	4th
2019	Antwerp, Belgium	2nd
2021	Amsterdam, Netherlands	2nd
2023	Mönchengladbach, Germany	3rd
2025	Mönchengladbach, Germany	2nd
2027	London, England	Qualified

World League
Year	Round	Host city	Position
2012–13	Semifinal	Rotterdam, Netherlands	1st
2012–13	Final	San Miguel de Tucumán, Argentina	7th
2014–15	Semifinal	Valencia, Spain	3rd
2014–15	Final	Rosario, Argentina	3rd
2016–17	Semifinal	Johannesburg, South Africa	2nd
2016–17	Final	Auckland, New Zealand	6th

FIH Pro League
Year	Host city	Position
2019	Amsterdam, Netherlands	3rd
2020–21	N/A	4th
2021–22	N/A	6th
2022–23	N/A	5th
2023–24	N/A	2nd
2024–25	N/A	7th
2025–26	N/A	5th

Olympic Games
Year	Host city	Position
1980	Moscow, Soviet Union	N/A
1984	Los Angeles, United States	2nd
1988	Seoul, South Korea	5th
1992	Barcelona, Spain	2nd
1996	Atlanta, United States	6th
2000	Sydney, Australia	7th
2004	Athens, Greece	1st
2008	Beijing, China	4th
2012	London, United Kingdom	7th
2016	Rio de Janeiro, Brazil	3rd
2020	Tokyo, Japan	6th
2024	Paris, France	6th

Champions Trophy
Year	Host city	Position
1987	Amstelveen, Netherlands	DNP
1989	Germany, West Germany	3rd
1991	Berlin, Germany	2nd
1993	Amstelveen, Netherlands	3rd
1995	Mar del Plata, Argentina	4th
1997	Berlin, Germany	2nd
1999	Brisbane, Australia	3rd
2000	Amstelveen, Netherlands	2nd
2001	Amstelveen, Netherlands	DNP
2002	Macau, China	DNP
2003	Sydney, Australia	DNP
2004	Rosario, Argentina	2nd
2005	Canberra, Australia	5th
2006	Amstelveen, Netherlands	1st
2007	Quilmes, Argentina	3rd
2008	Mönchengladbach, Germany	2nd
2009	Sydney, Australia	4th
2010	Nottingham, England	4th
2011	Amstelveen, Netherlands	8th
2012	Roasario, Argentina	4th
2014	Mendoza, Argentina	7th
2016	London, England	DNP
2018	Changzhou, China	DNP

Champions Challenge I
Year	Host city	Position
2002	Johannesburg, South Africa	DNP
2003	Catania, Italy	1st
2005 – 2014 Did Not participate

== Team ==
=== Current squad ===
The squad for the 2026 Women's FIH Hockey World Cup.

Head coach: Janneke Schopman

6. Friederike Heusgen
7. Linnea Weidemann (C)
10. Lisa Nolte (C)
11. Lena Micheel
12. Ines Wanner
13. Hanna Rothländer
14. Lucina von der Heyde
15. Nathalie Kubalski (GK)
16. Sonja Zimmermann
17. Lynn Krings
18. Lilly Stoffelsma
19. Finja Starck (GK)
21. Sara Strauss
23. Emma Davidsmeyer
25. Johanna Hachenberg
26. Felicia Wiedermann
27. Stine Kurz
28. Jette Fleschütz
55. Emilia Landshut
77. Yani Zhong

=== Notable players ===
- Britta Becker
- Nadine Ernsting-Krienke
- Franziska Hentschel
- Natascha Keller
- Fanny Rinne

== Results and fixtures ==
The following is a list of match results in the last 12 months, as well as any future matches that have been scheduled.

Win Draw Loss Fixture

=== 2026 ===
6 February 2026 2025–26 Women's FIH Pro League	Germany	1–3	Belgium	Valencia, Spain
13:30	Haid 20'	Report	Marien 4'; Dewate 34', 49'	Stadium: Estadio Beteró

7 February 2026 2025–26 Women's FIH Pro League	Spain	1–1 (4–2 p)	Germany	Valencia, Spain
13:30	Bosch 50'	Report	Krings 24'	Stadium: Estadio Beteró
	Penalties
	P. Jiménez (penalty shoot-out scored); Vidosa (penalty shoot-out scored); Segú (penalty shoot-out scored); L. Jiménez (penalty shoot-out scored)		(penalty shoot-out scored) Haid; (penalty shoot-out missed) Frerichs; (penalty shoot-out scored) Zhong; (penalty shoot-out missed) Strauss

9 February 2026 2025–26 Women's FIH Pro League	Belgium	1–0	Germany	Valencia, Spain
13:30	D. Marien 51'	Report		Stadium: Estadio Beteró

10 February 2026 2025–26 Women's FIH Pro League	Spain	3–1	Germany	Valencia, Spain
11:00	Álvarez 37', 42', 54'	Report	Fleschütz 23'	Stadium: Estadio Beteró

13 June 2026 2025–26 Women's FIH Pro League	England	1–2	Germany	London, England
15:00	Howard 59'	Report	Fleschütz 26'; Hachenberg 34'	Stadium: Lee Valley Hockey and Tennis Centre

14 June 2026 2025–26 Women's FIH Pro League	England	0–3	Germany	London, England
15:00		Report	Wiedermann 13'; Heusgen 45'; Hachenberg 48'	Stadium: Lee Valley Hockey and Tennis Centre

17 June 2026 2025-26 Women's FIH Pro League	Germany	0–2	Australia	London, England
19:30		Report	Kershaw 20'; Arnott 26'	Stadium: Lee Valley Hockey Stadium

18 June 2026 2025-26 Women's FIH Pro League	Australia	1–5	Germany	London, England
19:30	Downes 20'	Report	Fleschütz 8'; Hachenberg 10'; Wiedermann 12'; Nolte 40', 45'	Stadium: Lee Valley Hockey Stadium

23 June 2026 2025–26 Women's FIH Pro League	Germany	2–0	Ireland	Berlin, Germany
20:30	Krings 51'; Strauss 59'	Report		Stadium: Ernst-Reuter Sportfeld

25 June 2026 2025–26 Women's FIH Pro League	Germany	2–1	China	Berlin, Germany
17:30	Schwabe 12'; Wiedermann 44'	Report	Yu 50'	Stadium: Ernst-Reuter Sportfeld

26 June 2026 2025–26 Women's FIH Pro League	Germany	3–1	Ireland	Berlin, Germany
20:30	Stoffelsma 9'; Micheel 55'; Krings 60'	Report	Torrans 55'	Stadium: Ernst-Reuter Sportfeld

28 June 2026 2025–26 Women's FIH Pro League	Germany	5–1	China	Berlin, Germany
15:30	Stoffelsma 46'; Fleschütz 47'; Schwabe 57'; Strauss 58'; Zimmermann 60'	Report	Tan 59'	Stadium: Ernst-Reuter Sportfeld

31 July India Series	Germany	3–0	India	Heilbronn, Germany
16:00		Report		Stadium: Hockey Club TSG

1 August India Series	Germany	1–0	India	Heilbronn, Germany
16:00		Report		Stadium: Hockey Club TSG

15 August 2026 World Cup Pool B	Germany	3–0	Scotland	Wavre, Belgium
11:30	Zhong 19'; Hachenberg 24'; Krings 59'	Report		Stadium: Belfius Hockey Arena

17 August 2026 World Cup Pool B	Germany	2–3	Argentina	Wavre, Belgium
17:00	Nolte 51'; Zimmermann 53'	Report	Trinchinetti 3'; Gorzelany 48', 56'	Stadium: Belfius Hockey Arena

19 August 2026 World Cup Pool B	United States	1–3	Germany	Wavre, Belgium
14:00	Sessa 39'	Report	Fleschütz 21', 43'; Nolte 33'	Stadium: Belfius Hockey Arena

22 August 2026 World Cup Pool F	Germany	1–3	Belgium	Wavre, Belgium
17:30	Nolte 32'	Report	Marien 23'; Vanden Borre 34'; Englebert 42'	Stadium: Belfius Hockey Arena

24 August 2026 World Cup Pool F	Spain	1–4	Germany	Wavre, Belgium
17:00	Giné 41'	Report	Krings 5'; Strauss 14'; Fleschütz 42'; Micheel 43'	Stadium: Belfius Hockey Arena

27 August 2026 World Cup 5th place match	India	3–1	Germany	Amstelveen, Netherlands
15:00	Ishika 43'; Navneet 44', 47'	Report	Krings 59'	Stadium: Wagener Stadium

== See also ==
- East Germany women's national field hockey team
- Germany men's national field hockey team
- Germany women's national under-21 field hockey team
