= Michelle Carey (field hockey) =

Irish field hockey player (born 1999)

Personal information
- Nationality: Ireland
- Born: 5 May 1999 (age 27)

Sport
- Sport: Field hockey
- College team: UCD

Michelle Carey (born 5 May 1999) is an Irish field hockey player. She competed in the 2020 Summer Olympics. She currently studies engineering at UCD.
