= Women's Feldhockey Bundesliga =

- Sport: Field hockey
- Founded: 1940; 86 years ago
- Administrator: Deutscher Hockey-Bund
- No. of teams: 12
- Country: Germany
- Confederation: EHF (Europe)
- Most recent champion: Düsseldorfer HC (3rd title) (2023–24)
- Most titles: Harvestehude (14 titles)
- Level on pyramid: Level 1
- Relegation to: 2. Bundesliga
- International cup: Euro Hockey League
- Website: hockeybundesliga.de

The Feldhockey Bundesliga is the top level of women's field hockey in Germany and is organized by the German Hockey Federation. The league ranks second European women's league rankings. It was established in 1940.

== Format ==
The season starts in August or September and is interrupted by the indoor hockey season from November to March. From April the outdoor season will be continued. Since the 2011–12 season the league was played by twelve teams who played each other twice and who competed for four spots in the championship play-offs. The number one and four and the number two and three played each other in the semi-final and winners qualified for the final where the winner was crowned champion. The two last-placed teams were relegated to the 2nd Bundesliga.

For the 2019–20 season the German Hockey Federation introduced a new format. The league is played by twelve teams grouped in two pools of six (Pool A and Pool B) based on the previous season's ranking. The teams of the same pool compete 2 times and face the teams of the other pool once. The first four of each pool are qualified for the play-offs and the last two of each pool play the play-downs.

The quarter-finals of the play-offs are played in best-of-2 according to the following scheme:

- Series 1: 1A/4B
- Series 2: 2B/3A
- Series 3: 1B/4A
- Series 4: 2A/3B

== Finals ==
1940–1984
Season	Winner	Result	Runner-up	Venue
1940	Rot-Weiß Berlin	5–1	Würzburger Kickers	Berlin
1940–41	Würzburger Kickers	1–0	WAC	Munich
1941–42	Harvestehuder THC	2–0	Würzburger Kickers	Würzburg
1942–43	Harvestehuder THC	4–1	Würzburger Kickers	Hamburg
1943–44	Harvestehuder THC	7–0	Düsseldorfer SC	Hamburg
1949–50	Harvestehuder THC	0–0 (a.e.t.); 3–1 (a.e.t.) (Note: An extra match was needed because the previous match ended in a draw after extra time)	1. FC Nürnberg	Hamburg; Nuremberg
1950–51	Harvestehuder THC	3–1	Blau-Weiß Berlin	Berlin
1951–52	Würzburger Kickers	3–2 (a.e.t.)	Harvestehuder THC	Hamburg
1952–53	Würzburger Kickers	5–0	Harvestehuder THC	Würzburg
1953–54	1. FC Nürnberg	2–1	SC Brandenburg	Berlin
1954–55	Würzburger Kickers	1–0	GW Wuppertal	Wuppertal
1955–56	Würzburger Kickers	0–0 (a.e.t.); 2–1	1. FC Nürnberg	Nuremberg; Würzburg
1956–57	Harvestehuder THC	3–1	UHC Hamburg	Hamburg
1957–58	Harvestehuder THC	2–0	UHC Hamburg	Hamburg
1958–59	Harvestehuder THC	5–1	UHC Hamburg	Hamburg
1959–60	Harvestehuder THC	1–1 (a.e.t.); 1–0	UHC Hamburg	Hamburg; Hamburg
1960–61	SC Brandenburg	2–1	UHC Hamburg	Berlin
1961–62	Harvestehuder THC	1–0	UHC Hamburg	Hamburg
1962–63	UHC Hamburg	4–0	SC Brandenburg	Hamburg
1963–64	Harvestehuder THC	0–0 (a.e.t.); 2-1 (a.e.t.)	Eintracht Braunschweig	Braunschweig; Hamburg
1964–65	Eintracht Braunschweig	0–0 (a.e.t.); 1–1 (a.e.t.); 3–1 (a.e.t.)	Großflottbeker THGC	Hamburg; Braunschweig; Hannover
1965–66	Großflottbeker THGC	4–1	Harvestehuder THC	Hamburg
1967–68	Harvestehuder THC	1–0	Großflottbeker THGC	Hamburg
1968–69	Eintracht Braunschweig	1–0	HC Rot-Weiß München	Braunschweig
1969–70	Großflottbeker THGC	2–2 (a.e.t.); 1–0	Harvestehuder THC	Hamburg; Hamburg
1970–71	Harvestehuder THC	1–0	Großflottbeker THGC	Hamburg
1971–72	TSV Zehlendorf 88	2–1	SC Brandenburg	Berlin
1972–73	Harvestehuder THC	2–0 (a.e.t.)	Blau-Weiß Köln	Cologne
1973–74	Eintracht Braunschweig	3–0	Großflottbeker THGC	Braunschweig
1974–75	Eintracht Braunschweig	1–1 (a.e.t.); 2-1 (a.e.t.)	SC Brandenburg	Berlin; Braunschweig
1975–76	Eintracht Braunschweig	2–1	SC Brandenburg	Berlin
1976–77	Großflottbeker THGC	2–1	Eintracht Braunschweig	Hamburg
1977–78	Eintracht Braunschweig	1–0 (a.e.t.)	Großdlottbeker THGC	Braunschweig
1978–79	Großflottbeker THGC	2–0	Blau-Weiß Köln	Hamburg
1979–80	Blau-Weiß Köln	3–2 (a.e.t.)	1. Hanauer THC	Cologne
1980–81	1. Hanauer THC	1–0	Blau-Weiß Köln	Hanau
1981–82	RTHC Leverkusen	1–0	Blau-Weiß Köln	Cologne
1982–83	RTHC Leverkusen	3–1 (p.s.)	Blau-Weiß Köln	Leverkusen
1983–84	1. Hanauer THC	5–4 (p.s.)	SC Brandenburg	Hanau

1984–present
Season	Winner	Result	Runner-up	Venue
1984–85	RTHC Leverkusen	3–1 (a.e.t.)	Blau-Weiß Köln	Cologne
1985–86	Blau-Weiß Köln	3–1	RTHC Leverkusen	Leverkusen
1986–87	Blau-Weiß Köln	1–0	Club Raffelberg	Duisburg
1987–88	SC Frankfurt 80	3–2 (a.e.t.)	1. Hanauer THC	Velbert
1988–89	SC Frankfurt 80	3–2 (a.e.t.)	Eintracht Frankfurt	Frankfurt
1989–90	RTHC Leverkusen	2–1 (a.e.t.)	SC Frankfurt 80	Frankfurt
1990–91	Eintracht Frankfurt	1–0	Club Raffelberg	Frankfurt
1991–92	Rüsselsheimer RK	1–0	RTHC Leverkusen	Rüsselsheim
1992–93	Rüsselsheimer RK	6–5 (p.s.)	RTHC Leverkusen	Leverkusen
1993–94	Berliner HC	1–0 (a.e.t.)	Rüsselsheimer RK	Hamburg
1994–95	Rüsselsheimer RK	2–1	Beriner HC	Rüsselsheim
1995–96	Berliner HC	3–1	RTHC Leverkusen	Berlin
1996–97	Rüsselsheimer RK	3–1	Berliner HC	Frankfurt
1997–98	Rot-Weiss Köln	2–0	Berliner HC	Duisburg
1998–99	Berliner HC	4–1	Rot-Weiss Köln	Hamburg
1999–2000	Berliner HC	3–2	Rot-Weiss Köln	Berlin
2000–01	Rösselsheimer RK	5–3 (p.s.)	Berliner HC	Hamburg
2001–02	Klipper Hamburg	1–0	Club an der Alster	Berlin
2002–03	Rot-Weiss Köln	2–0	Klipper Hamburg	Hamburg
2003–04	Rüsselsheimer RK	5–3 (p.s.)	Rot-Weiss Köln	Cologne
2004–05	Berliner HC	4–3 (p.s.)	Rot-Weiss Köln	Düsseldorf
2005–06	Berliner HC	2–1	Club an der Alster	Cologne
2006–07	Rot-Weiss Köln	2–1	Rüsselsheimer RK	Mönchengladbach
2007–08	Berliner HC	1–0 (a.e.t.)	Rot-Weiss Köln	Hamburg
2008–09	UHC Hamburg	1–0	Club an der Alster	Düsseldorf
2009–10	Berliner HC	4–2	UHC Hamburg	Mannheim
2010–11	UHC Hamburg	4–1	Rot-Weiss Köln	Hamburg
2011–12	Rot-Weiss Köln	1–0	UHC Hamburg	Berlin
2012–13	Berliner HC	3–2 (a.e.t.)	UHC Hamburg	Hamburg
2013–14	Rot-Weiss Köln	3–3 (a.e.t.) (7–6 p.s.)	UHC Hamburg	Hamburg
2014–15	UHC Hamburg	4–0	Müncher SC	Hamburg
2015–16	UHC Hamburg	3–3 (3–2 s.o.)	Rot-Weiss Köln	Mannheim
2016–17	UHC Hamburg	2–0	Mannheimer HC	Mannheim
2017–18	Club an der Alster	3–1	UHC Hamburg	Krefeld
2018–19	Club an der Alster	1–1 (4–2 s.o.)	Düsseldorfer HC	Krefeld
2019–2021	Düsseldorfer HC	1–1 (3–2 s.o.)	Mannheimer HC	Mannheim
2021–22	Düsseldorfer HC	0–0 (3–2 s.o.)	Mannheimer HC	Bonn
2022–23	Mannheimer HC	5–4	Club an der Alster	Mannheim
2023–24	Düsseldorfer HC	2–1	Mannheimer HC	Bonn

== Champions ==
=== By club ===
Club	Championships	Runners-up	Seasons won
Harvestehuder THC	14	4	1941–42, 1942–43, 1943–44, 1949–50, 1950–51, 1956–57, 1957–58, 1058–59, 1959–60, 1961–62, 1967–68, 1970–71, 1972–73
Berliner HC	9	4	1993–93, 1995–96, 1998–99, 1999–2000, 2004–05, 2005–06, 2007–08, 2009–10, 2012–13
UHC Hamburg	6	11	1962–63, 2008–09, 2010–11, 2014–15, 2015–16, 2016–17
Rüsselsheimer RK	6	2	1991–92, 1992–92, 1994–95, 1996–97, 2000–01, 2003–04
Eintracht Braunschweig	6	2	1964–65, 1968–69, 1973–74, 1974–75, 1975–76, 1977–78
Rot-Weiss Köln	5	7	1997–98, 2002–03, 2006–07, 2011–12, 2013–14
Würzburger Kickers	5	3	1940–41, 1951–52, 1952–53, 1954–55, 1955–56
Großflottbeker THGC	4	5	1965–66, 1969–70, 1976–77, 1978–79
RTHC Leverkusen	4	4	1981–82, 1982–83, 1984–85, 1989–90
Blau-Weiß Köln	3	6	1979–80, 1985–86, 1986–87
Düsseldorfer HC	3	1	2019–2021, 2021–22, 2023–24
Club an der Alster	2	4	2017–18, 2018–19
1. Hanauer THC	2	2	1980–81, 1983–84
SC Frankfurt 80	2	1	1987–88, 1988–89
SC Brandenburg	1	6	1960–61
Mannheimer HC	1	4	2022–23
1. FC Nürnberg	1	2	1953–54
Eintracht Frankfurt	1	1	1990–91
Klipper Hamburg	1	1	2001–02
Rot-Weiß Berlin	1	0	1940
TSV Zehlendorf 88	1	0	1971–72
Club Raffelberg	0	2	
Düsseldorfer SC	0	1	
Blau-Weiss Berlin	0	1	
Rot-Weiß München	0	1	
Münchner SC	0	1	
WAC	0	1	
GW Wuppertal	0	1	

=== By state ===
State	Championships	Runners-up	Clubs
Hamburg	27	25	Harvestehuder THC (14), UHC Hamburg (6), Großflottbeker THGC (4), Club an der Alster (2), Klipper Hamburg (1)
North Rhine-Westphalia	15	22	Rot-Weiss Köln (5), RTHC Leverkusen (4), Blau-Weiß Köln (3), Düsseldorfer HC (3)
Berlin	12	11	Berliner HC (9), SC Brandenburg (1), Rot-Weiß Berlin (1), TSV Zehlendorf 88 (1)
Hesse	11	6	Rüsselsheimer RK (6), 1. Hanauer THC (2), SC Frankfurt 80 (2), Eintracht Frankfurt (1)
Bavaria	6	7	Würzburger Kickers (5), 1. FC Nürnberg (1)
Lower Saxony	6	2	Eintracht Braunschweig (6)
Baden-Württemberg	1	4	Mannheimer HC (1)
Austria	0	1	

== See also ==
- German Hockey Federation
- Men's Feldhockey Bundesliga
