= Field hockey at the 2018 Asian Games – Women's team squads =

Ten national teams will compete in the women's field hockey tournament at the 2018 Asian Games in Indonesia. A maximum of eighteen players were officially enrolled in each squad.

== Pool A ==
=== China ===
The following is the China roster in the women's field hockey tournament of the 2018 Asian Games.

Head coach: (Germany) Jamilon Mülders

2. Gu Bingfeng
3. Song Xiaoming
5. Li Jiaqi
7. Cui Qiuxia (C)
8. Zhou Yu
10. Peng Yang
11. Liang Meiyu
13. Li Hong
15. Zhang Jinrong
16. Ou Zixia
19. Zhang Xiaoxue
20. He Jiangxin
22. Chen Yi (GK)
23. De Jiaojiao
25. Xi Xiayun
29. Chen Yi
30. Dan Wen
32. Ye Jiao (GK)

=== Japan ===
The following is the Japan roster in the women's field hockey tournament of the 2018 Asian Games.

Head coach: (Australia) Anthony Farry

1. Megumi Kageyama (GK)
2. Natsuki Naito
3. Akiko Ota
4. Emi Nishikori
5. Shihori Oikawa
6. Kimika Hoshi
7. Mayumi Ono
8. Yukari Mano
9. Akiko Kato
10. Hazuki Nagai
11. Minami Shimizu
12. Yuri Nagai
13. Aki Yamada
14. Maho Segawa
15. Yui Ishibashi
16. Mami Karino
17. Motomi Kawamura (C)
18. Akio Tanaka (GK)

=== Malaysia ===
The following is the Malaysia roster in the women's field hockey tournament of the 2018 Asian Games.

Head coach: (Malaysia) Dharma Raj Abdullah

1. Farah Yahya (GK)
2. Nuraini Rashid
3. Nuraslinda Said
5. Hasliza Ali
6. Norsharina Shabuddin
7. Siti Ruhani (C)
8. Juliani Din
11. Norazlin Sumantri
12. Hanis Onn
13. Surizan Awang
14. Zafirah Aziz
15. Syafiqah Zain
16. Huzaimah Aziz (GK)
19. Fazilla Sylvester
20. Norfaiezah Saiuti
21. Fatin Sukri
26. Nuramirah Zulkifli
29. Kirandeep Kaur

=== Hong Kong ===
The following is the Hong Kong roster in the women's field hockey tournament of the 2018 Asian Games.

Head coach: (Hong Kong) Arif Ali

1. Yip Ting Wai (GK)
2. Chan Yi Man
3. Tiffany Chan
4. Katherine Mountain
5. Evelyn Cheung
6. Wong Wai Ki
7. Chan Chi
8. Melvina Cheng
9. Weeraya Ho
10. Chan Ching Nam
11. Chuen Sze Sze
12. Ngan Yuet
13. Patricia Chiu
14. Lau Pui Sze
15. Lo I Ka (C)
16. Hong Ka Man (GK)
17. Melissa Law Ka Mun
18. Olivia Chiu

=== Chinese Taipei ===
The following is the Chinese Taipei roster in the women's field hockey tournament of the 2018 Asian Games.

Head coach: (Chinese Taipei) Su Chih-hua

1. Chang Chia-yi (GK)
2. Yang Chun-hui
3. Chen Tsai-yu
4. Liu Li-yen
5. Chen Ying-li
6. Yang Chia-yu
11. Tseng Wan-ju (C)
12. Su Chieh-yu
13. Shih Shu-hsin
16. Wang Shih-hsin
17. Lin Ting-yun
18. Lin Chia-jung (GK)
20. Cheng I-lun
21. Liao Pei-shan
23. Liu Kuan-yu

== Pool B ==
=== South Korea ===
The following is the South Korea roster in the women's field hockey tournament of the 2018 Asian Games.

Head coach: (South Korea) Huh Sang-young

1. Jang Soo-ji (GK)
2. Choi Su-ji
4. Kim Young-ran (C)
5. Lee Yu-rim
8. An Hyo-ju
10. Park Mi-hyun
11. Park Seung-a
12. Lee Young-sil
13. Cho Eun-ji
14. Cho Yun-kyoung
16. Cheon Seul-ki
17. Kim Ok-ju
18. Kim Bo-mi
19. Cho Hye-jin
21. Shin Hye-jeong
22. Jang Hee-sun
23. Lee Yu-ri
31. Hwang Hyeon-a (GK)

=== India ===
The following is the India roster in the women's field hockey tournament of the 2018 Asian Games.

Head coach: (Netherlands) Sjoerd Marijne

1. Navjot Kaur
2. Gurjit Kaur
3. Deep Grace Ekka
4. Monika Malik
6. Reena Khokhar
8. Nikki Pradhan
11. Savita Punia (GK)
13. Rajani Etimarpu (GK)
16. Vandana Katariya
17. Deepika Thakur
18. Udita
19. Namita Toppo
20. Lalremsiami
25. Navneet Kaur
26. Sunita Lakra
28. Rani Rampal (C)
31. Lilima Minz
32. Neha Goyal

=== Thailand ===
The following is the Thailand roster in the women's field hockey tournament of the 2018 Asian Games.

Head coach: (South Korea) Bae Young-wook

1. Alisa Narueangram (GK)
2. Pornsuree Toemsombatbowon
3. Suwapat Konthong
4. Kanyanat Nakpolkrung
5. Sirikwan Wongkeaw
6. Onuma Doungsuda
7. Tikhamporn Sakunpithak
8. Jenjira Inpa
9. Khwanchanok Suksin
10. Thanaporn Tongkham
11. Natthakarn Aunjai
12. Nasha Jutawijittam
13. Supansa Samanso (C)
14. Manassaree Prasanpim
15. Mutmee Maneepura
16. Anongnat Piresram
17. Kornkanok Sanpoung
18. Siraya Yimkrajang (GK)

=== Kazakhstan ===
The following is the Kazakhstan roster in the women's field hockey tournament of the 2018 Asian Games.

Head coach: (Kazakhstan) Nurzhan Beibitov

1. Guzal Bakhavaddin(GK)
2. Assel Mukasheva
3. Dilnaz Khairusheva
4. Natalya Sazontova
5. Alina Bissirova
6. Nagima Koishybek
7. Viktoriya Lyapina
8. Sabina Nursilanova
9. Karina Kassumova
10. Vera Domashneva
11. Elvira Utigenova
12. Malida Srazhaddinova
13. Alissa Chepkassova
14. Irina Dobrioglo
15. Natalya Gataulina (C)
16. Alexandra Lipunova
17. Symbat Sabazova

=== Indonesia ===
The following is the Indonesia roster in the women's field hockey tournament of the 2018 Asian Games.

Head coach: (Malaysia) Lim Chiow Chuan

1. Selly Florentina (GK)
2. Irianti Ratnaningsih
5. Tiffani Makharti
7. Lispa
8. Yuanita Suwito
9. Masriana
10. Nur Anisa
11. Ira Juarsyi
12. Rwede Sawor
13. Diana Nazar
14. Melinda
15. Sismiya Kadarisma
17. Annur El-Islamy
22. Aulia Arindah
23. Feriana (C)
25. Olevia Kbarek
28. Rayhan Uno
30. Sarah Amaniah (GK)
