= 2019 Women's Ready Steady Tokyo Hockey Tournament squads =

This article displays the rosters for the teams competing at the 2019 Ready Steady Tokyo women's field hockey test event. Each team had to submit 18 players.

== Teams ==
=== Australia ===
The following 16 players were named in the Australia squad, which was announced on 6 August.

Head Coach: (Australia) Paul Gaudoin

1. Sophie Taylor
2. Ambrosia Malone
3. Brooke Peris
4. Amy Lawton
8. Georgia Wilson
13. Edwina Bone
15. Kaitlin Nobbs
17. Georgina Morgan (C)
21. Renee Taylor
22. Kate Jenner
23. Kalindi Commerford
26. Emily Chalker (C)
27. Rachael Lynch (GK)
28. Kristina Bates
30. Grace Stewart
31. Savannah Fitzpatrick

=== China ===
The following 16 players were named in the China squad.

Head Coach: (China) Huang Yongsheng

1. Li Dongxiao (GK)
2. Gu Bingfeng
3. Song Xiaoming
5. Li Jiaqi
7. Cui Qiuxia (C)
8. Sun Xiao
9. Xu Wenyu
11. Liang Meiyu
12. Guo Qiu
13. Li Hong
15. Zhang Jinrong
19. Zhang Xiaoxue
20. He Jiangxin
24. Luo Tiantian
28. Wang Na
31. Zhong Jiaqi

=== India ===
The following 16 players were named in the India squad, which was announced on 26 July.

Head Coach: (Netherlands) Sjoerd Marijne

1. Navjot Kaur
2. Gurjit Kaur
3. Deep Grace Ekka
4. Monika
6. Reena Khokhar
7. Sharmila Devi
11. Savita (GK)
15. Nisha
16. Vandana Katariya
20. Lalremsiami
25. Navneet Kaur
27. Sushila Pukhrambam
28. Rani (C)
30. Salima Tete
31. Lilima Minz
32. Neha Goyal

=== Japan ===
The following 16 players were named in the Japan squad, which was announced on 10 August.

Head Coach: (Australia) Anthony Farry

1. Megumi Kageyama (GK)
7. Mayumi Ono
8. Yukari Mano (C)
9. Yuri Nagai
10. Hazuki Nagai
11. Shihori Oikawa
12. Kana Nomura
13. Miki Kozuka
15. Yui Ishibashi
16. Shoko Kanefuji
18. Emi Nishikori
20. Minami Shimizu
22. Motomi Kawamura
26. Miyu Suzuki
28. Aki Mitsuhashi
29. Sakurako Omoto
