= 2018 Women's Hockey Champions Trophy =

Field hockey tournament

Tournament details
- Host country: China
- City: Changzhou
- Dates: 17–25 November
- Teams: 6
- Venue: Wujin Hockey Stadium

Final positions
- Champions: Netherlands (7th title)
- Runner-up: Australia
- Third place: Argentina

Tournament statistics
- Matches played: 18
- Goals scored: 56 (3.11 per match)
- Top scorer: (Netherlands) Marijn Veen (5 goals)
- Best player: (Netherlands) Eva de Goede

The 2018 Women's Hockey Champions Trophy was the 23rd and last edition of the Hockey Champions Trophy for women. It was held between 17 and 25 November 2018 in Changzhou, China.

The Netherlands won the tournament for the seventh time after defeating Australia 5–1 in the final, tying the record of seven titles previously set by Argentina in 2016.

== Host city change ==
When the FIH unveiled the event hosts for the 2015–2018 cycle, Argentina was chosen to host this tournament. However, in March 2016, the FIH had to terminate all contractual agreements with Argentina as the Argentine Hockey Confederation was unable to fulfil their contractual obligations in regards to television rights, sponsorship and the hosting of events. Changzhou was announced as the host instead.

== Qualification ==
Alongside the host nation, the defending champions, the last Olympic, World Cup and World League champions qualified automatically. The remaining spots were nominated by the FIH Executive Board, making a total of six competing teams. If teams qualified under more than once criteria, the additional teams were invited by the FIH Executive Board as well.

- China (Host nation)
- Argentina (Defending champions)
- Great Britain (Champions of 2016 Summer Olympics)
- Netherlands (Champions of 2016–17 World League and the 2018 Hockey World Cup)
- Australia (Invited by the FIH Executive Board)
- Japan (Invited by the FIH Executive Board)

== Squads ==
Argentina

Head coach: Agustín Corradini

1. Belén Succi (GK)
2. Sofía Toccalino
3. Agustina Gorzelany
4. Eugenia Trinchinetti
5. Agostina Alonso
7. Martina Cavallero
12. Delfina Merino (C)
14. Agustina Habif
15. María José Granatto
16. Florencia Habif
17. Rocío Sánchez Moccia
18. Victoria Sauze
20. Lucina von der Heyde
21. Milagros Fernández Ladra
26. Paula Ortiz
28. Julieta Jankunas
29. Julia Gomes Fantasia
31. Florencia Mutio (GK)
Australia

Head coach: Paul Gaudoin

2. Ambrosia Malone
3. Brooke Peris
5. Ashlee Wells (GK)
6. Penny Squibb
7. Jodie Kenny
9. Lily Brazel
10. Maddy Fitzpatrick
11. Karri McMahon
12. Greta Hayes
13. Edwina Bone
14. Stephanie Kershaw
15. Kaitlin Nobbs
18. Jane Claxton
23. Kalindi Commerford
26. Emily Smith
27. Rachael Lynch (GK)
29. Rebecca Greiner
31. Hayley Padget
China

Head coach: Huang Yongsheng

2. Gu Bingfeng
6. Tang Wanli
7. Cui Qiuxia (C)
8. Sun Xiao
9. Xu Wengyu
10. Peng Yang
11. Liang Meiyu
13. Li Hong
15. Zhang Jinrong
16. Ou Zixia
19. Zhang Xiaoxue
20. He Juangxin
21. Zhong Mengling
22. Chen Yi (GK)
25. Xi Xiayun
26. Chen Yang
30. Dan Wen
32. Ye Jiao (GK)
Great Britain

Head coach: David Ralph

3. Amy Tennant (GK)
4. Laura Unsworth
5. Sarah Haycroft
6. Anna Toman
7. Hannah Martin
9. Susannah Townsend
10. Sarah Robertson
11. Suzy Petty
12. Erica Sanders
14. Tessa Howard
17. Sarah Jones
18. Giselle Ansley
19. Sophie Bray
20. Hollie Pearne-Webb (C)
25. Sabbie Heesh (GK)
26. Lily Owsley
31. Grace Balsdon
32. Amy Costello
Japan

Head coach: Anthony Farry

1. Megumi Kageyama (GK)
2. Natsuki Naito (C)
3. Mayumi Ono
4. Natsuha Matsumoto
5. Yu Asai
7. Hazuki Nagai
8. Yukari Mano
10. Minami Shimizu
12. Yuri Nagai
14. Maho Segawa
15. Yui Ishibashi
16. Shihori Oikawa
19. Kanon Mori
20. Mami Karino
21. Kimika Hoshi
22. Motomi Kawamura
29. Sakurako Omoto
30. Yuka Yoshikawa (GK)
Netherlands

Head coach: Alyson Annan

1. Anne Veenendaal (GK)
2. Renée van Laarhoven
6. Laurien Leurink
7. Xan de Waard
11. Maria Verschoor
13. Caia van Maasakker
16. Ginella Zerbo
18. Pien Sanders
19. Marijn Veen
20. Laura Nunnink
21. Lauren Stam
22. Josine Koning (GK)
23. Margot van Geffen
24. Eva de Goede (C)
25. Maxime Kerstholt
27. Yibbi Jansen
28. Margot Zuidhof
29. Maartje Krekelaar

== Results ==
All times are local (UTC+8).

=== Standings ===
Pos	Team	Pld	W	D	L	GF	GA	GD	Pts	Qualification
1	Netherlands	5	5	0	0	15	2	+13	15	Final
2	Australia	5	2	1	2	5	7	−2	7	Final
3	Argentina	5	2	0	3	6	7	−1	6	Third place game
4	China (H)	5	1	3	1	5	4	+1	6	Third place game
5	Japan	5	1	2	2	6	10	−4	5	Fifth place game
6	Great Britain	5	0	2	3	4	11	−7	2	Fifth place game

Source: FIH
Rules for classification: 1) points; 2) games won; 3) goal difference; 4) goals scored; 5) head-to-head result.
(H) Hosts

=== Fixtures ===
17 November 2018
14:00

Great Britain	2–2	China
Martin 15'; Owlsey 23'	Report	Xu 7'; Peng 21'

Umpires:
Fanneke Alkemade (NED)
Junko Wagatsuma (JPN)

17 November 2018
16:00

Australia	2–1	Argentina
Malone 12'; Greiner 15'	Report	Granatto 33'

Umpires:
Celine Martin-Schmets (BEL)
Emma Shelbourn (NZL)

17 November 2018
18:00

Netherlands	3–1	Japan
Veen 44', 59'; Verschoor 56'	Report	Oikawa 35'

Umpires:
Suzi Sutton (USA)
Chen Hong (CHN)

18 November 2018
14:00

Australia	2–0	Great Britain
Peris 9'; Commerford 29'	Report

Umpires:
Ivona Makar (CRO)
Chen Hong (CHN)

18 November 2018
16:00

China	0–0	Japan
	Report

Umpires:
Emma Shelbourn (NZL)
Fanneke Alkemade (NED)

18 November 2018
18:00

Netherlands	3–0	Argentina
Van Maasakker 27', 48'; Jansen 45'	Report

Umpires:
Aleesha Unka (NZL)
Junko Wagatsuma (JPN)

20 November 2018
14:00

Australia	0–3	Netherlands
	Report	Veen 21'; Van Maasakker 28'; Zerbo 46'

Umpires:
Ivona Makar (CRO)
Suzi Sutton (USA)

20 November 2018
16:00

Argentina	0–2	China
	Report	Zhang J. 13'; Li 28'

Umpires:
Kim Jung-hee (KOR)
Celine Martin-Schmets (BEL)

20 November 2018
18:00

Japan	2–2	Great Britain
H. Nagai 22', 41'	Report	Bray 4'; Howard 6'

Umpires:
Chen Hong (CHN)
Aleesha Unka (NZL)

22 November 2018
14:00

Argentina	4–0	Japan
Trinchinetti 19'; Jankunas 21', 48'; Gorzelany 41'	Report

Umpires:
Emma Shelbourn (NZL)
Kim Jung-hee (KOR)

22 November 2018
16:00

China	0–0	Australia
	Report

Umpires:
Fanneke Alkemade (NED)
Ivona Makar (CRO)

22 November 2018
18:00

Great Britain	0–4	Netherlands
	Report	Veen 3'; Zuidhof 17', 46'; Zerbo 36'

Umpires:
Celine Martin-Schmets (BEL)
Junko Wagatsuma (JPN)

24 November 2018
14:00

Japan	3–1	Australia
Y. Nagai 3'; Mano 8'; Shimizu 45'	Report	Squibb 54'

Umpires:
Celine Martin-Schmets (BEL)
Suzi Sutton (USA)

24 November 2018
16:00

Netherlands	2–1	China
Kerstholt 14'; Veen 59'	Report	Gu 60'

Umpires:
Emma Shelbourn (NZL)
Kim Jung-hee (KOR)

24 November 2018
18:00

Great Britain	0–1	Argentina
	Report	Sauze 2'

Umpires:
Aleesha Unka (NZL)
Fanneke Alkemade (NED)

=== Classification ===
==== Fifth and sixth place ====
25 November 2018
14:00

Japan	1–2	Great Britain
Ishibashi 4'	Report	Martin 5'; Costello 21'

Umpires:
Suzi Sutton (USA)
Chen Hong (CHN)

==== Third and fourth place ====
25 November 2018
16:15

Argentina	6–0	China
Merino 1'; Granatto 5', 16'; Jankunas 44'; Toccalino 48'; Cavallero 57'	Report

Umpires:
Aleesha Unka (NZL)
Junko Wagatsuma (JPN)

==== Final ====
25 November 2018
18:30

Netherlands	5–1	Australia
De Waard 7'; De Goede 11'; Stam 43'; Kerstholt 53'; Verschoor 56'	Report	Fitzpatrick 40'

Umpires:
Ivona Makar (CRO)
Kim Jung-hee (KOR)

== Statistics ==
=== Final standings ===
1. Netherlands
2. Australia
3. Argentina
4. China
5. Great Britain
6. Japan

=== Awards ===
The following individual awards were given at the conclusion of the tournament.

Top Goalscorer	Player of the Tournament	Goalkeeper of the Tournament	Young Player of the Tournament
(Netherlands) Marijn Veen	(Netherlands) Eva de Goede	(China) Ye Jiao	(Netherlands) Marijn Veen

=== Goalscorers ===
There were 56 goals scored in 18 matches, for an average of 3.11 goals per match.

5 goals

- (Netherlands) Marijn Veen

3 goals

- (Argentina) María José Granatto
- (Argentina) Julieta Jankunas
- (Netherlands) Caia van Maasakker

2 goals

- (United Kingdom) Hannah Martin
- (Japan) Hazuki Nagai
- (Netherlands) Maxime Kerstholt
- (Netherlands) Maria Verschoor
- (Netherlands) Ginella Zerbo
- (Netherlands) Margot Zuidhof

1 goal

- (Argentina) Martina Cavallero
- (Argentina) Agustina Gorzelany
- (Argentina) Delfina Merino
- (Argentina) Victoria Sauze
- (Argentina) Sofía Toccalino
- (Argentina) Eugenia Trinchinetti
- (Australia) Kalindi Commerford
- (Australia) Maddy Fitzpatrick
- (Australia) Rebecca Greiner
- (Australia) Ambrosia Malone
- (Australia) Brooke Peris
- (Australia) Penny Squibb
- (China) Gu Bingfeng
- (China) Li Hong
- (China) Zhang Jinrong
- (China) Xu Wenyu
- (China) Peng Yang
- (United Kingdom) Sophie Bray
- (United Kingdom) Amy Costello
- (United Kingdom) Tessa Howard
- (United Kingdom) Lily Owsley
- (Japan) Yui Ishibashi
- (Japan) Yukari Mano
- (Japan) Yuri Nagai
- (Japan) Shihori Oikawa
- (Japan) Minami Shimizu
- (Netherlands) Eva de Goede
- (Netherlands) Yibbi Jansen
- (Netherlands) Lauren Stam
- (Netherlands) Xan de Waard

Source: FIH
