= 2018–19 Women's FIH Series Finals =

Tournament details
- Dates: 8–27 June 2019
- Teams: 24 (from 5 confederations)
- Venue: 3 (in 3 host cities)

Tournament statistics
- Matches played: 60
- Goals scored: 308 (5.13 per match)
- Top scorer: (India) Gurjit Kaur (11 goals)

The 2018–19 Women's FIH Series Finals were the second stage of the 2018–19 edition of the Hockey Series. It was held in June 2019.

The top two teams from each event qualified for the 2019 FIH Olympic Qualifiers.

== Qualification ==
The following 24 teams, shown with pre-tournament World Rankings as of December 2018, when the pools were composed, qualified for the FIH Series Finals.

Dates	Event	Location	Quotas	Qualifier(s)
Nine highest ranked nations in the FIH World Rankings not playing in the FIH Pro League			9	India (9); Ireland (8); Italy (17); Japan (14); Poland (23); Scotland (18); South Africa (15); South Korea (11); Spain (7)
5–10 June 2018	2018–19 Hockey Series Open	Salamanca, Mexico	2	Canada (21); Mexico (30)
23 June – 1 July 2018	2018–19 Hockey Series Open	Singapore	2	Malaysia (22); Thailand (28)
6–8 July 2018	2018–19 Hockey Series Open	Wattignies, France	3	Belarus (20); France (32); Russia (25)
13–18 August 2018	2018–19 Hockey Series Open	Port Vila, Vanuatu	1	Fiji (59)
21–26 August 2018	2018–19 Hockey Series Open	Vilnius, Lithuania	3	Czech Republic (19); Ukraine (27); Wales (26)
18–23 September 2018	2018–19 Hockey Series Open	Santiago, Chile	2	Chile (14); Uruguay (24)
7–9 December 2018	2018–19 Hockey Series Open	Bulawayo, Zimbabwe	1	Namibia (60)
21 January 2019	Appointed by the FIH		1	Singapore (Note: Singapore qualified as the highest ranked nation not already qualified via the other two routes) (35)
Total			24	

== Banbridge ==
FIH Series Finals Banbridge
Tournament details
- Host country: Northern Ireland
- City: Banbridge
- Dates: 8–16 June
- Teams: 8
- Venue: Banbridge Hockey Club

Final positions
- Champions: South Korea
- Runner-up: Ireland
- Third place: Malaysia

Tournament statistics
- Matches played: 20
- Goals scored: 94 (4.7 per match)
- Top scorer: (Ireland) Anna O'Flanagan (6 goals)
- Best player: (Ireland) Anna O'Flanagan

The tournament was originally scheduled to take place in Dublin but the venues, where it would be held, would not be finished in time, so the tournament was moved to Banbridge.

All times are local (UTC+1).

=== First round ===
==== Pool A ====
Pos	Team	Pld	W	D	L	GF	GA	GD	Pts	
1	Ireland (H)	3	3	0	0	21	2	+19	9	Semi-finals
2	Malaysia	3	2	0	1	16	3	+13	6	Cross-overs
3	Czech Republic	3	1	0	2	7	11	−4	3	Cross-overs
4	Singapore	3	0	0	3	0	28	−28	0	Seventh place game

Source: FIH
Rules for classification: 1) points; 2) matches won; 3) goal difference; 4) goals for; 5) head-to-head result; 6) field goals scored.
(H) Hosts

8 June 2019
15:00

Ireland	2–1	Malaysia
Barr 4'; Mullan 39'	Report	Husain 55'

Umpires:
Mariana Reydo (ARG)
Lelia Sacre (CAN)

8 June 2019
17:00

Czech Republic	5–0	Singapore
Decsyová 20'; Hájková 22', 58'; Duchková 52'; Lehovcová 54'	Report

Umpires:
Junko Wagatsuma (JPN)
Rachel Williams (ENG)

9 June 2019
15:00

Czech Republic	1–8	Ireland
Reichlová 54'	Report	Daly 4', 58'; O'Flanagan 15', 34', 49', 51'; Wilson 42'; Hawkshaw 47'

Umpires:
Hannah Harrison (ENG)
Ana Faias (POR)

9 June 2019
17:00

Malaysia	12–0	Singapore
Onn 9'; Rashid 12', 28', 35'; Awang 19'; Gurdip 21'; Syafi 39'; Husain 42', 47'; Sylvester 44'; Saiuti 51'; Shabuddin 60'	Report

Umpires:
Andrea Nicholson (RSA)
Violeta Eismayer (AUT)

11 June 2019
12:00

Malaysia	3–1	Czech Republic
Saiuti 28'; Sylvester 47'; Sukri 54'	Report	Lehovcová 47'

Umpires:
Claire Druijts (NED)
Rachel Williams (ENG)

11 June 2019
14:00

Ireland	11–0	Singapore
Frazer 7'; Mullan 9', 57'; Pinder 11'; Upton 18', 23'; Tice 18'; Hawkshaw 21'; Matthews 49'; O'Flanagan 56'; Wilson 60'	Report

Umpires:
Mariana Reydo (ARG)
Junko Wagatsuma (JPN)

==== Pool B ====
Pos	Team	Pld	W	D	L	GF	GA	GD	Pts	
1	South Korea	3	3	0	0	9	1	+8	9	Semi-finals
2	Scotland	3	1	0	2	6	5	+1	3	Cross-overs
3	France	3	1	0	2	4	5	−1	3	Cross-overs
4	Ukraine	3	1	0	2	3	11	−8	3	Seventh place game

Source: FIH
Rules for classification: 1) points; 2) matches won; 3) goal difference; 4) goals for; 5) head-to-head result; 6) field goals scored.

8 June 2019
11:00

South Korea	5–0	Ukraine
Kang J. 3'; Lee Yu-rim 25', 47'; Lee S. 32'; Lee Yu-ri 48'	Report

Umpires:
Ana Faias (POR)
Violeta Eismayer (AUT)

8 June 2019
13:00

Scotland	1–2	France
Holmes 23'	Report	Seillier 3'; Vankemmel 48'

Umpires:
Hannah Harrison (ENG)
Andrea Nicholson (RSA)

9 June 2019
11:00

Ukraine	3–2	France
Kernoz 7', 47'; Tyshchenko 12'	Report	Simon 21'; Lhopital 49'

Umpires:
Durga Devi (IND)
Mariana Reydo (ARG)

9 June 2019
13:00

Scotland	1–3	South Korea
Holmes 6'	Report	Cho H. 22'; Kang J. 23'; Seo 40'

Umpires:
Claire Druijts (NED)
Junko Wagatsuma (JPN)

11 June 2019
16:00

South Korea	1–0	France
Kang J. 58'	Report

Umpires:
Durga Devi (IND)
Violeta Eismayer (AUT)

11 June 2019
18:00

Ukraine	0–4	Scotland
	Report	Jamieson 18'; Semple 20'; Watson 41'; Alexander-Lloyd 48'

Umpires:
Lelia Sacre (CAN)
Andrea Nicholson (RSA)

=== Second round ===
Cross-overs
13 June
Scotland	0 (3)
Czech Republic (p.s.o.)	0 (4)
13 June
Malaysia	3
France	2

Semi-finals
15 June
Ireland	4
Czech Republic	0
15 June
South Korea	3
Malaysia	0

Final
16 June
Ireland	1
South Korea	3
Third place
16 June
Czech Republic	0
Malaysia	3

==== Cross-overs ====
13 June 2019
15:45

Malaysia	3–2	France
Rashid 5'; Sukri 8'; Onn 15'	Report	Gaspari 9'; Von Bolhuis 26'

Umpires:
Hannah Harrison (ENG)
Lelia Sacre (CAN)

13 June 2019
18:00

Scotland	0–0	Czech Republic
	Report
Penalties
Watson (penalty shoot-out missed); Burnet (penalty shoot-out missed); Jamieson (penalty shoot-out scored); Dark (penalty shoot-out missed); Cuthbert (penalty shoot-out scored); Jamieson (penalty shoot-out scored); Cuthbert (penalty shoot-out missed)	3–4	(penalty shoot-out scored) Hájková; (penalty shoot-out missed) Mejzlikova; (penalty shoot-out missed) Holubcová; (penalty shoot-out missed) Laciná; (penalty shoot-out scored) Kolářová; (penalty shoot-out scored) Hájková; (penalty shoot-out scored) Kolářová

Umpires:
Ana Faias (POR)
Rachel Williams (ENG)

==== Seventh and eighth place ====
15 June 2019
11:00

Singapore	0–3	Ukraine
	Report	Kernoz 33'; Shevchenko 38'; Samokhodchenko 48'

Umpires:
Durga Devi (IND)
Mariana Reydo (ARG)

==== Fifth and sixth place ====
16 June 2019
11:00

France	0–6	Scotland
	Report	Campbell 18'; Semple 20', 55'; Collins 41'; Jamieson 58'; Cuthbert 58'

Umpires:
Claire Druijts (NED)
Violeta Eismayer (AUT)

==== Semi-finals ====
15 June 2019
13:15

Ireland	4–0	Czech Republic
McCay 20'; Wilson 22'; Hawkshaw 50'; O'Flanagan 60'	Report

Umpires:
Rachel Williams (ENG)
Lelia Sacre (CAN)

15 June 2019
15:30

South Korea	3–0	Malaysia
Cho H. 12'; Kim H. 17'; Cheon 48'	Report

Umpires:
Claire Druijts (NED)
Hannah Harrison (ENG)

==== Third and fourth place ====
16 June 2019
13:15

Czech Republic	0–3	Malaysia
	Report	Onn 11'; Sylvester 34'; Gurdip 60'

Umpires:
Ana Faias (POR)
Mariana Reydo (ARG)

==== Final ====
16 June 2019
15:30

Ireland	1–3	South Korea
Daly 59'	Report	Kim H. 46'; Cheon 56'; Kang J. 60'

Umpires:
Andrea Nicholson (RSA)
Junko Wagatsuma (JPN)

=== Final standings ===
Rank	Team
1st place, gold medalist(s)	South Korea
2nd place, silver medalist(s)	Ireland
3rd place, bronze medalist(s)	Malaysia
4	Czech Republic
5	Scotland
6	France
7	Ukraine
8	Singapore

Qualified for the FIH Olympic Qualifiers

=== Awards ===
The following awards were given at the conclusion of the tournament.

Best Player	Best Goalkeeper	Best Young Player	Top Goalscorer
(Ireland) Anna O'Flanagan	(France) Mathilde Petriaux	(France) Yohanna Lhopital	(Ireland) Anna O'Flanagan

== Hiroshima ==
FIH Series Finals Hiroshima
Tournament details
- Host country: Japan
- City: Hiroshima
- Dates: 15–23 June
- Teams: 8
- Venue: Hiroshima Hockey Stadium

Final positions
- Champions: India
- Runner-up: Japan
- Third place: Chile

Tournament statistics
- Matches played: 20
- Goals scored: 103 (5.15 per match)
- Top scorer: (India) Gurjit Kaur (11 goals)
- Best player: (India) Rani Rampal

All times are local (UTC+9).

=== First round ===
==== Pool A ====
Pos	Team	Pld	W	D	L	GF	GA	GD	Pts	
1	India	3	3	0	0	20	1	+19	9	Semi-finals
2	Poland	3	1	1	1	6	5	+1	4	Cross-overs
3	Uruguay	3	1	1	1	5	4	+1	4	Cross-overs
4	Fiji	3	0	0	3	0	21	−21	0	Seventh place game

Source: FIH
Rules for classification: 1) points; 2) matches won; 3) goal difference; 4) goals for; 5) head-to-head result; 6) field goals scored.

15 June 2019
16:00

Poland	6–0	Fiji
Błaszyk 33', 58'; Bratkowska 39'; Grochowalska 44'; Rybacha 55'; Katerla 60'	Report

Umpires:
Cookie Tan (SGP)
Kim Yoon-seon (KOR)

15 June 2019
18:00

India	4–1	Uruguay
Rani 10'; G. Kaur 21'; Jyoti 40'; Lalremsiami 56'	Report	Viana 51'

Umpires:
Mary Driscoll (USA)
Chieko Soma (JPN)

16 June 2019
16:00

Uruguay	4–0	Fiji
Amadeo 33'; Piazza 38', 43'; Vilar del Valle 59'	Report

Umpires:
Chieko Soma (JPN)
Veronica Villafañe (ARG)

16 June 2019
18:00

Poland	0–5	India
	Report	Jyoti 21'; Katariya 26'; G. Kaur 28', 35'; Navn. Kaur 56'

Umpires:
Katrina Woolf (NZL)
Chen Jianjun (CHN)

18 June 2019
12:00

Uruguay	0–0	Poland
	Report

Umpires:
Chen Hong (CHN)
Kim Yoon-seon (KOR)

18 June 2019
14:00

India	11–0	Fiji
Lalremsiami 4'; Rani 10'; Monika 11', 33'; Katariya 12'; G. Kaur 15', 19', 21', 22'; Minz 51'; Navn. Kaur 57'	Report

Umpires:
Katrina Woolf (NZL)
Mary Driscoll (USA)

==== Pool B ====
Pos	Team	Pld	W	D	L	GF	GA	GD	Pts	
1	Russia	3	2	0	1	12	4	+8	6	Semi-finals
2	Chile	3	2	0	1	12	6	+6	6	Cross-overs
3	Japan (H)	3	2	0	1	9	4	+5	6	Cross-overs
4	Mexico	3	0	0	3	0	19	−19	0	Seventh place game

Updated to match(es) played on 16 June 2019. Source: FIH
Rules for classification: 1) points; 2) matches won; 3) goal difference; 4) goals for; 5) head-to-head result; 6) field goals scored.
(H) Hosts

15 June 2019
12:00

Chile	7–0	Mexico
Urroz 3', 12', 47'; De las Heras 4', 45'; Arrieta 11'; Villagrán 14'	Report

Umpires:
Chen Jianjun (CHN)
Rhiannon Murrie (AUS)

15 June 2019
14:00

Japan	2–1	Russia
Yamashita 11'; H. Nagai 26'	Report	Sadovaia 8'

Umpires:
Katrina Woolf (NZL)
Veronica Villafañe (ARG)

16 June 2019
12:00

Russia	6–0	Mexico
Yushkova 7'; Khalimova 8'; Eroshina 9'; Sorokina 22'; Sadovaia 38', 60+'	Report

Umpires:
Mary Driscoll (USA)
Cookie Tan (SGP)

16 June 2019
14:00

Chile	3–1	Japan
Krimerman 4'; Villagrán 54'; De las Heras 60'	Report	Suzuki 38'

Umpires:
Suzi Sutton (USA)
Chen Hong (CHN)

18 June 2019
16:00

Japan	6–0	Mexico
Y. Nagai 4'; Mori 9'; Kato 29', 30+'; Tanaka 40'; Urata 54'	Report

Umpires:
Veronica Villafañe (ARG)
Cookie Tan (SGP)

18 June 2019
18:00

Russia	5–2	Chile
Svezhentseva 29'; Sadovaia 39'; Golubeva 49'; Yushkova 53'; Bordolimova 56'	Report	Walbaum 41'; García 46'

Umpires:
Suzi Sutton (USA)
Rhiannon Murrie (AUS)

=== Second round ===
Cross-overs
20 June
Chile	5
Uruguay	2
20 June
Poland	0
Japan	5

Semi-finals
22 June
India	4
Chile	2
22 June
Russia	1 (1)
Japan (p.s.o.)	1 (3)

Final
23 June
India	3
Japan	1
Third place
23 June
Chile (p.s.o.)	3 (3)
Russia	3 (1)

==== Cross-overs ====
20 June 2019
15:45

Poland	0–5	Japan
	Report	Y. Nagai 21', 51'; Tanaka 37'; Karino 53'; Mori 56'

Umpires:
Chen Hong (CHN)
Chen Jianjun (CHN)

20 June 2019
18:00

Chile	5–2	Uruguay
Arrieta 11'; García 14', 19', 30+'; De las Heras 45+'	Report	Stanley 1'; Viana 54'

Umpires:
Suzi Sutton (USA)
Kim Yoon-seon (KOR)

==== Seventh and eighth place ====
21 June 2019
15:45

Fiji	0–5	Mexico
	Report	Oviedo 14'; Estrada 38'; Navarro 41', 47', 52'

Umpires:
Veronica Villafañe (ARG)
Rhiannon Murrie (AUS)

==== Fifth and sixth place ====
21 June 2019
18:00

Poland	2–2	Uruguay
Sławińska 29'; Bratkowska 39'	Report	Viana 3', 7'
Penalties
Sławińska (penalty shoot-out scored); Katerla (penalty shoot-out scored); Zagajska (penalty shoot-out scored); Polewczak (penalty shoot-out missed); Balcerzak (penalty shoot-out scored); Sławińska (penalty shoot-out scored)	5–4	(penalty shoot-out missed) Vilar del Valle; (penalty shoot-out scored) Algorta; (penalty shoot-out scored) Barrandeguy; (penalty shoot-out scored) Piazza; (penalty shoot-out scored) Viana; (penalty shoot-out missed) Barrandeguy

Umpires:
Chieko Soma (JPN)
Katrina Woolf (NZL)

==== Semi-finals ====
22 June 2019
15:45

India	4–2	Chile
G. Kaur 22', 37'; Navn. Kaur 31'; Rani 57'	Report	García 18'; Urroz 43'

Umpires:
Chen Hong (CHN)
Chen Jianjun (CHN)

22 June 2019
18:00

Russia	1–1	Japan
Sadovaia 27'	Report	Yamashita 27'
Penalties
Leonova (penalty shoot-out missed); Sadovaia (penalty shoot-out scored); Golubeva (penalty shoot-out missed); Shumilina (penalty shoot-out missed)	1–3	(penalty shoot-out scored) Mori; (penalty shoot-out scored) H. Nagai; (penalty shoot-out missed) Y. Nagai; (penalty shoot-out scored) Mano

Umpires:
Suzi Sutton (USA)
Kim Yoon-seon (KOR)

==== Third and fourth place ====
23 June 2019
15:45

Chile	3–3	Russia
De las Heras 3', 32'; Krimerman 15'	Report	Khalimova 28'; Bordolimova 43'; Yushkova 48'
Penalties
Tala (penalty shoot-out scored); De las Heras (penalty shoot-out scored); García (penalty shoot-out missed); Ananias (penalty shoot-out scored)	3–1	(penalty shoot-out scored) Bordolimova; (penalty shoot-out missed) Sadovaia; (penalty shoot-out missed) Sorokina; (penalty shoot-out missed) Svezhentseva

Umpires:
Chieko Soma (JPN)
Rhiannon Murrie (AUS)

==== Final ====
23 June 2019
18:00

India	3–1	Japan
Rani 3'; G. Kaur 45', 60'	Report	Mori 11'

Umpires:
Cookie Tan (SGP)
Mary Driscoll (USA)

=== Final standings ===
Rank	Team
1st place, gold medalist(s)	India
2nd place, silver medalist(s)	Japan (Note: Japan cannot qualify for the FIH Olympic Qualifiers because they are already qualified for the 2020 Summer Olympics as hosts.)
3rd place, bronze medalist(s)	Chile
4	Russia
5	Poland
6	Uruguay
7	Mexico
8	Fiji

Qualified for the FIH Olympic Qualifiers

=== Awards ===
The following awards were given at the conclusion of the tournament.

Best Player	Best Goalkeeper	Best Young Player	Top Goalscorer
(India) Rani Rampal	(Japan) Megumi Kageyama	(Russia) Mariia Bordolimova	(India) Gurjit Kaur

== Valencia ==
FIH Series Finals Valencia
Tournament details
- Host country: Spain
- City: Valencia
- Dates: 19–27 June
- Teams: 8
- Venue: Estadio Betero

Final positions
- Champions: Spain
- Runner-up: Canada
- Third place: Italy

Tournament statistics
- Matches played: 20
- Goals scored: 113 (5.65 per match)
- Top scorer: (Canada) Brienne Stairs (8 goals)

All times are local (UTC+2).

=== First round ===
==== Pool A ====
Pos	Team	Pld	W	D	L	GF	GA	GD	Pts	
1	Canada	3	2	1	0	21	1	+20	7	Semi-finals
2	Spain (H)	3	2	1	0	19	4	+15	7	Cross-overs
3	Belarus	3	1	0	2	9	11	−2	3	Cross-overs
4	Namibia	3	0	0	3	1	34	−33	0	Seventh place game

Source: FIH
Rules for classification: 1) points; 2) matches won; 3) goal difference; 4) goals for; 5) head-to-head result; 6) field goals scored.
(H) Hosts

19 June 2019
11:00

Belarus	7–0	Namibia
Papkova 12', 17', 24', 32'; Sazhina 26'; Syrayezhka 33'; Belavusava 34'	Report

Umpires:
Mercedes Sánchez (ARG)
Wanri Venter (RSA)

19 June 2019
19:00

Spain	1–1	Canada
Salvatella 1'	Report	Stairs 11'

Umpires:
Fanneke Alkemade (NED)
Gabriele Schmitz (GER)

21 June 2019
17:00

Canada	17–0	Namibia
Stairs 2', 29', 31', 47', 52'; McManus 7', 44', 50', 53'; Norlander 9', 17'; Haughn 11', 13'; A. Woodcroft 15'; Wong 23'; Secco 24'; Hennig 57'	Report

Umpires:
Ines El Hajem (FRA)
Catalina Montesino (CHI)

21 June 2019
19:00

Belarus	2–8	Spain
Papkova 23', 45'	Report	Segu 14'; Riera 22', 52'; Bonastre 24'; Salvatella 45'; Petchamé 53', 55'; García Grau 57'

Umpires:
Sophie Bockelmann (GER)
Emma Shelbourn (ENG)

22 June 2019
17:00

Canada	3–0	Belarus
Norlander 15', 59'; Wright 52'	Report

Umpires:
Emma Shelbourn (ENG)
Gabriele Schmitz (GER)

22 June 2019
19:00

Spain	10–1	Namibia
Salvatella 10'; Pérez 11'; Guinea 15', 33'; Riera 21', 41', 48'; Bonastre 33'; Segu 35'; Petchamé 46'	Report	Van Rooyen 7'

Umpires:
Mercedes Sánchez (ARG)
Ines El Hajem (FRA)

==== Pool B ====
Pos	Team	Pld	W	D	L	GF	GA	GD	Pts	
1	South Africa	3	2	1	0	11	3	+8	7	Semi-finals
2	Italy	3	2	0	1	12	3	+9	6	Cross-overs
3	Wales	3	1	1	1	8	6	+2	4	Cross-overs
4	Thailand	3	0	0	3	0	19	−19	0	Seventh place game

Source: FIH
Rules for classification: 1) points; 2) matches won; 3) goal difference; 4) goals for; 5) head-to-head result; 6) field goals scored.

19 June 2019
13:00

Italy	7–0	Thailand
Pacella 2'; Cesanelli 10'; Vynohradova 26', 34', 59'; Oviedo 34'; Ruggieri 56'	Report

Umpires:
Catalina Montesino (CHI)
Sophie Bockelmann (GER)

19 June 2019
17:00

South Africa	2–2	Wales
Du Plessis 33'; Bobbs 41'	Report	French 19'; Wilkinson 49'

Umpires:
Emma Shelbourn (ENG)
Ilaria Amorosini (ITA)

20 June 2019
17:00

Wales	5–0	Thailand
Robinson 11'; Wilkinson 18', 45'; Marke-Jones 34'; Hughes 51'	Report

Umpires:
Dahiya Deepa (IND)
Mercedes Sánchez (ARG)

20 June 2019
19:00

Italy	1–2	South Africa
Bianchi 53'	Report	Wood 30'; Chamberlain 42'

Umpires:
Ines El Hajem (FRA)
Gabriele Schmitz (GER)

22 June 2019
11:00

South Africa	7–0	Thailand
Du Plessis 3', 37'; Veto 23'; Chamberlain 29', 33'; Bobbs 45'; Deetlefs 60+'	Report

Umpires:
Ilaria Amorosini (ITA)
Dahiya Deepa (IND)

22 June 2019
13:00

Wales	1–4	Italy
Robinson 47'	Report	Vynohradova 8'; Bianchi 9'; Traverso 35'; Oviedo 55'

Umpires:
Fanneke Alkemade (NED)
Wanri Venter (RSA)

=== Second round ===
Cross-overs
24 June
Italy	4
Belarus	1
24 June
Spain	1
Wales	0

Semi-finals
26 June
Canada	7
Italy	0
26 June
South Africa	0
Spain	1

Final
27 June
Canada	2
Spain	4
Third place
27 June
Italy	3
South Africa	1

==== Cross-overs ====
24 June 2019
16:45

Italy	4–1	Belarus
Oviedo 15'; Cesanelli 39'; Bianchi 45+'; Pacella 46'	Report	Sazhina 48'

Umpires:
Gabriele Schmitz (GER)
Catalina Montesino (CHI)

24 June 2019
19:00

Spain	1–0	Wales
Jiménez 9'	Report

Umpires:
Wanri Venter (RSA)
Fanneke Alkemade (NED)

==== Seventh and eighth place ====
25 June 2019
16:45

Namibia	1–2	Thailand
Cormack 47'	Report	Sakulpithak 10', 27'

Umpires:
Dahiya Deepa (IND)
Ines El Hajem (FRA)

==== Fifth and sixth place ====
25 June 2019
19:00

Wales	1–2	Belarus
Wilkinson 59'	Report	Papkova 21'; Nikitsina 27'

Umpires:
Sophie Bockelmann (GER)
Ilaria Amorosini (ITA)

==== Semi-finals ====
26 June 2019
16:45

Canada	7–0	Italy
McManus 14'; Donohoe 19', 53'; Stairs 28'; Johansen 38', 49'; Haughn 58'	Report

Umpires:
Wanri Venter (RSA)
Emma Shelbourn (ENG)

26 June 2019
19:00

South Africa	0–1	Spain
	Report	García Grau 53'

Umpires:
Fanneke Alkemade (NED)
Mercedes Sánchez (ARG)

==== Third and fourth place ====
27 June 2019
16:45

Italy	3–1	South Africa
Ruggieri 34'; Oviedo 38'; Bianchi 38'	Report	Glasby 52'

Umpires:
Emma Shelbourn (ENG)
Catalina Montesino (CHI)

==== Final ====
27 June 2019
19:00

Canada	2–4	Spain
McManus 11'; Stairs 17'	Report	Segu 8'; Ycart 13'; Riera 20'; Cano 33'

Umpires:
Mercedes Sánchez (ARG)
Fanneke Alkemade (NED)

=== Final standings ===
Rank	Team
1st place, gold medalist(s)	Spain
2nd place, silver medalist(s)	Canada
3rd place, bronze medalist(s)	Italy
4	South Africa
5	Belarus
6	Wales
7	Thailand
8	Namibia

Qualified for the FIH Olympic Qualifiers

=== Awards ===
The following awards were given at the conclusion of the tournament.

Best Player	Best Goalkeeper	Best Young Player	Top Goalscorer
(Spain) Georgina Oliva	(Wales) Rose Thomas	(Canada) Anna Mollenhauer	(Canada) Brienne Stairs

== Goalscorers ==
The following goalscorers list comprises players from each event.

There were 308 goals scored in 60 matches, for an average of 5.13 goals per match.

11 goals

- (India) Gurjit Kaur

8 goals

- (Canada) Brienne Stairs

7 goals

- (Belarus) Krestina Papkova

6 goals

- (Canada) Sara McManus
- (Chile) Consuelo de las Heras
- (Ireland) Anna O'Flanagan
- (Spain) Lola Riera

5 goals

- (Chile) Carolina García
- (Russia) Bogdana Sadovaia

4 goals

- (Canada) Stephanie Norlander
- (Chile) Manuela Urroz
- (India) Rani Rampal
- (Italy) Eugenia Bianchi
- (Italy) Lara Oviedo
- (Italy) Maryna Vynohradova
- (Japan) Akiko Yamashita
- (Malaysia) Nuraini Rashid
- (South Korea) Kang Ji-Na
- (Uruguay) Teresa Viana
- (Wales) Leah Wilkinson

3 goals

- (Canada) Hannah Haughn
- (India) Navneet Kaur
- (Ireland) Nicola Daly
- (Ireland) Sarah Hawkshaw
- (Ireland) Kathryn Mullan
- (Ireland) Zoe Wilson
- (Japan) Kanon Mori
- (Japan) Yuri Nagai
- (Malaysia) Siti Husain
- (Malaysia) Hanis Onn
- (Malaysia) Fazilla Sylvester
- (Mexico) Michel Navarro
- (Russia) Dayana Yushkova
- (Scotland) Fiona Semple
- (South Africa) Dirkie Chamberlain
- (South Africa) Lilian du Plessis
- (Spain) Carlota Petchamé
- (Spain) Carola Salvatella
- (Spain) Marta Segú
- (Ukraine) Yevheniya Kernoz

2 goals

- (Belarus) Elena Sazhina
- (Canada) Rachel Donohoe
- (Canada) Karli Johansen
- (Chile) Fernanda Arrieta
- (Chile) Denise Krimerman
- (Chile) Fernanda Villagran
- (Czech Republic) Natálie Hájková
- (Czech Republic) Adéla Lehovcová
- (India) Jyoti
- (India) Vandana Katariya
- (India) Lalremsiami
- (India) Monika Malik
- (Ireland) Roisin Upton
- (Italy) Sofía Cesanelli
- (Italy) Elisabetta Pacella
- (Italy) Giuliana Ruggieri
- (Japan) Izuki Tanaka
- (Malaysia) Norfaiezah Saiuti
- (Malaysia) Fatin Sukri
- (Poland) Wiktoria Błaszyk
- (Poland) Oriana Bratkowska
- (Russia) Mariia Bordolimova
- (Russia) Alina Khalimova
- (Scotland) Kate Holmes
- (Scotland) Sarah Jamieson
- (South Africa) Quanita Bobbs
- (South Korea) Cheon Eun-Bi
- (South Korea) Cho Hye-Jin
- (South Korea) Kim Hyun-Ji
- (South Korea) Lee Yu-Rim
- (Spain) Berta Bonastre
- (Spain) Begoña García
- (Spain) Cristina Guinea
- (Thailand) Tikhamporn Sakulpithak
- (Uruguay) Camila Piazza
- (Wales) Sophie Robinson

1 goal

- (Belarus) Darya Belavusava
- (Belarus) Maryna Nikitsina
- (Belarus) Nastassia Syrayezhka
- (Canada) Danielle Hennig
- (Canada) Madeline Secco
- (Canada) Elise Wong
- (Canada) Amanda Woodcroft
- (Canada) Katherine Wright
- (Chile) Sofía Walbaum
- (Czech Republic) Veronika Decosyová
- (Czech Republic) Lucie Duchková
- (Czech Republic) Jindřiška Richlová
- (France) Guusje van Bolhuis
- (France) Delfina Gaspari
- (France) Yohanna Lhopital
- (France) Perrine Seillier
- (France) Marie Simon
- (France) Victorine Vankemmel
- (India) Lilima Minz
- (Ireland) Bethany Barr
- (Ireland) Megan Frazer
- (Ireland) Hannah Matthews
- (Ireland) Shirley McCay
- (Ireland) Gillian Pinder
- (Ireland) Elena Tice
- (Italy) Celina Traverso
- (Japan) Mami Karino
- (Japan) Hazuki Nagai
- (Japan) Kana Urata
- (Japan) Miyu Suzuki
- (Malaysia) Surizan Awang
- (Malaysia) Kirandeep Gurdip
- (Malaysia) Norsharina Shabuddin
- (Malaysia) Nurmaizatulhanim Syafi
- (Malaysia) Nuramirah Zulkifli
- (Mexico) Arlette Estrada
- (Mexico) Fernanda Oviedo
- (Namibia) Kiana-Che Cormack
- (Namibia) Joane van Rooyen
- (Poland) Karolina Grochowalska
- (Poland) Amelia Katerla
- (Poland) Marlena Rybacha
- (Poland) Paula Sławińska
- (Russia) Svetlana Eroshina
- (Russia) Anna Golubeva
- (Russia) Evgeniia Sorokina
- (Russia) Kseniia Svezhentseva
- (Scotland) Nicola Alexander-Lloyd
- (Scotland) Louise Campbell
- (Scotland) Robyn Collins
- (Scotland) Kareena Cuthbert
- (Scotland) Charlotte Watson
- (South Africa) Lisa-Marie Deetlefs
- (South Africa) Tarryn Glasby
- (South Africa) Nomnikelo Veto
- (South Africa) Bianca Wood
- (South Korea) Seo Jung-Eun
- (South Korea) Lee Seung-Ju
- (South Korea) Lee Yu-Ri
- (Spain) Carmen Cano
- (Spain) Lucía Jiménez
- (Spain) Beatriz Pérez
- (Spain) Clara Ycart
- (Ukraine) Kateryna Samokhodchenko
- (Ukraine) Yuliia Shevchenko
- (Ukraine) Valeriia Tyshchenko
- (Uruguay) Sol Amadeo
- (Uruguay) Janine Stanley
- (Uruguay) Manuela Vilar del Valle
- (Wales) Sian French
- (Wales) Xenna Hughes
- (Wales) Natasha Marke-Jones

Source: Banbridge Hiroshima Valencia
