= 2016–17 Women's FIH Hockey World League Semifinals =

Field hockey tournament

The 2016–17 Women's FIH Hockey World League Semifinals took place in June and July 2017. A total of 20 teams competed in 2 events in this round of the tournament playing for 7 berths in the Final, to be played between 18–26 November 2017 in Auckland, New Zealand.

This round also served as a qualifier for the 2018 Women's Hockey World Cup as the 10/11 highest placed teams apart from the host nation and the five continental champions qualified.

== Qualification ==
11 teams ranked between 1st and 11th in the FIH World Rankings current at the time of seeking entries for the competition qualified automatically, in addition to 8 teams qualified from Round 2 and one nation that did not meet ranking criteria and was exempt from Round 2 to host a Semifinal. The following twenty teams, shown with final pre-tournament rankings, competed in this round of the tournament.

Dates	Event	Location	Quotas	Qualifier(s)
	Ranked 1st to 11th in the FIH World Rankings		11	Netherlands (1); Australia (4); Argentina (3); New Zealand (5); United States (6); Germany (7); China (8); England (2); South Korea(9); Japan (11); South Africa (13)
	Host nation		1	Belgium (14)
14–22 January 2017	2016–17 FIH Hockey World League Round 2	Kuala Lumpur, Malaysia	3	Ireland (15); Malaysia (22); Italy (16)
4–12 February 2017	2016–17 FIH Hockey World League Round 2	Valencia, Spain	3	Spain (10); Poland (18); Scotland (17)
25 March–2 April 2017	2016–17 FIH Hockey World League Round 2	Vancouver, Canada	2	India (12); Chile (20)

== Brussels ==

Tournament details
- Host country: Belgium
- City: Brussels
- Dates: 21 June–2 July 2017
- Teams: 10

Final positions
- Champions: Netherlands
- Runner-up: China
- Third place: New Zealand

Tournament statistics
- Matches played: 33
- Goals scored: 96 (2.91 per match)
- Top scorer: (Netherlands) Caia van Maasakker (7 goals)
- Best player: (China) Cui Qiuxia

All times are local (UTC+2).

=== First round ===
==== Pool A ====
Pos	Team	Pld	W	D	L	GF	GA	GD	Pts	Qualification
1	Netherlands	4	4	0	0	19	0	+19	12	Quarterfinals
2	South Korea	4	2	1	1	7	10	−3	7	Quarterfinals
3	Italy	4	1	2	1	4	8	−4	5	Quarterfinals
4	China	4	0	2	2	4	6	−2	2	Quarterfinals
5	Scotland	4	0	1	3	2	12	−10	1	

Source: FIH
Rules for classification: 1) points; 2) goal difference; 3) goals scored; 4) head-to-head result.

21 June 2017
14:00

China	2–2	Italy
Gu 3'; Wu 54'	Report	Oviedo 25'; Mastronardi 57'

Umpires:
Irene Presenqui (ARG)
Maggie Giddens (USA)

21 June 2017
18:00

Netherlands	4–0	Scotland
Matla 6'; Leurink 14'; Stam 33'; Van Male 55'	Report

Umpires:
Laurine Delforge (BEL)
Ana Faias (POR)

22 June 2017
14:00

South Korea	0–0	Italy
	Report

Umpires:
Amber Church (NZL)
Ana Faias (POR)

22 June 2017
16:00

China	1–1	Scotland
Gu 51'	Report	Merchant 8'

Umpires:
Frances Block (ENG)
Annelize Rostron (RSA)

24 June 2017
18:00

South Korea	0–9	Netherlands
	Report	Van Male 4', 23'; Van Maasakker 20', 56'; Leurink 25'; De Waard 27'; Matla 42'; Van Geffen 50'; Vega 59'

Umpires:
Emi Yamada (JPN)
Maggie Giddens (USA)

24 June 2017
20:00

Italy	2–1	Scotland
Wybieralska 2'; Singh 7'	Report	Holmes 40'

Umpires:
Amy Baxter (USA)
Kylie Seymour (AUS)

25 June 2017
18:00

China	0–1	Netherlands
	Report	Van den Assem 56'

Umpires:
Kylie Seymour (AUS)
Amber Church (NZL)

25 June 2017
20:00

Scotland	0–5	South Korea
	Report	Cheon E. 14'; Cheon K. 23', 33', 45'; Shin 35'

Umpires:
Annelize Rostron (RSA)
Irene Presenqui (ARG)

27 June 2017
14:00

South Korea	2–1	China
Cheon K. 43'; Cheon E. 59'	Report	Gu 47'

Umpires:
Amber Church (NZL)
Frances Block (ENG)

27 June 2017
18:00

Netherlands	5–0	Italy
Keetels 11'; Van Geffen 25'; Vega 41', 54'; Krekelaar 42'	Report

Umpires:
Emi Yamada (JPN)
Ana Faias (POR)

==== Pool B ====
Pos	Team	Pld	W	D	L	GF	GA	GD	Pts	Qualification
1	Australia	4	3	0	1	8	3	+5	9	Quarterfinals
2	New Zealand	4	3	0	1	4	1	+3	9	Quarterfinals
3	Belgium	4	2	0	2	10	2	+8	6	Quarterfinals
4	Spain	4	2	0	2	5	6	−1	6	Quarterfinals
5	Malaysia	4	0	0	4	1	16	−15	0	

Source: FIH
Rules for classification: 1) points; 2) goal difference; 3) goals scored; 4) head-to-head result.

21 June 2017
16:00

Australia	3–0	Malaysia
Fitzpatrick 4', 44'; Morgan 59'	Report

Umpires:
Amber Church (NZL)
Annelize Rostron (RSA)

21 June 2017
20:00

New Zealand	1–0	Spain
Merry 19'	Report

Umpires:
Frances Block (ENG)
Amy Baxter (USA)

22 June 2017
18:00

Spain	3–1	Malaysia
Salvatella 28'; Riera 31', 36'	Report	Ruhani 3'

Umpires:
Kylie Seymour (AUS)
Emi Yamada (JPN)

22 June 2017
20:00

Belgium	0–1	Australia
	Report	Morgan 12'

Umpires:
Amy Baxter (USA)
Maggie Giddens (USA)

24 June 2017
14:00

New Zealand	2–0	Australia
Neal 15', 57'	Report

Umpires:
Laurine Delforge (BEL)
Annelize Rostron (RSA)

24 June 2017
16:00

Malaysia	0–9	Belgium
	Report	Weyns 2'; Fobe 7'; Boon 22', 37'; Vanden Borre 33', 44'; Raes 48', 58'; Puvrez 53'

Umpires:
Ana Faias (POR)
Irene Presenqui (ARG)

25 June 2017
14:00

Australia	4–1	Spain
Slattery 28', 38'; Morgan 45+'; Smith 51'	Report	Jiménez 33'

Umpires:
Maggie Giddens (USA)
Laurine Delforge (BEL)

25 June 2017
16:00

Belgium	1–0	New Zealand
Raes 44'	Report

Umpires:
Frances Block (ENG)
Emi Yamada (JPN)

27 June 2017
16:00

New Zealand	1–0	Malaysia
Merry 5'	Report

Umpires:
Laurine Delforge (BEL)
Amy Baxter (USA)

27 June 2017
20:00

Belgium	0–1	Spain
	Report	Bonastre 24'

Umpires:
Kylie Seymour (AUS)
Irene Presenqui (ARG)

=== Second round ===
Fifth place
Italy	1
Australia	3
Seventh place
Spain(p.s.o)	1 (4)
Belgium	1 (1)

Consolation semifinals
Spain	1 (3)
Italy (p.s.o)	1 (4)
Belgium	1
Australia	5

Quarterfinals
Netherlands	2
Spain	0
New Zealand	2
Italy	0
South Korea (p.s.o)	1 (3)
Belgium	1 (2)
Australia	0
China	2

Semifinals
New Zealand	1 (4)
Netherlands (p.s.o)	1 (5)
South Korea	0
China	3

Final
Netherlands	2
China	0
Third place
New Zealand	1
South Korea	0

==== Quarterfinals ====
29 June 2017
13:15

New Zealand	2–0	Italy
Harrison 6'; Charlton 35'	Report

Umpires:
Annelize Rostron (RSA)
Amy Baxter (USA)

29 June 2017
15:30

Australia	0–2	China
	Report	Wu 32'; Liang 54'

Umpires:
Maggie Giddens (USA)
Frances Block (ENG)

29 June 2017
17:45

Netherlands	2–0	Spain
Van Maasakker 3', 32'	Report

Umpires:
Laurine Delforge (BEL)
Kylie Seymour (AUS)

29 June 2017
20:00

South Korea	1–1	Belgium
Cheon S. 3'	Report	Puvrez 32'
Penalties
Cheon E. (penalty shoot-out scored); Park S. (penalty shoot-out missed); Cho Y. (penalty shoot-out scored); Cho E. (penalty shoot-out scored)	3–2	(penalty shoot-out missed) Gerniers; (penalty shoot-out missed) Leclef; (penalty shoot-out scored) Versavel; (penalty shoot-out scored) Raes; (penalty shoot-out missed) Boon

Umpires:
Amber Church (NZL)
Irene Presenqui (ARG)

==== Ninth and tenth place ====
29 June 2017
11:00

Scotland	1–0	Malaysia
Robertson 7'	Report

Umpires:
Ana Faias (POR)
Emi Yamada (JPN)

==== Fifth to eighth place classification ====
===== Crossover =====
1 July 2017
11:15

Spain	1–1	Italy
Ybarra 59'	Report	Pacella 44'
Penalties
Pérez (penalty shoot-out scored); Bonastre (penalty shoot-out missed); López (penalty shoot-out scored); Ybarra (penalty shoot-out scored); Petchame (penalty shoot-out missed)	3–4	(penalty shoot-out scored) Carta; (penalty shoot-out scored) Mirabella; (penalty shoot-out scored) Di Mauro; (penalty shoot-out scored) Oviedo

Umpires:
Amber Church (NZL)
Maggie Giddens (USA)

1 July 2017
13:30

Belgium	1–5	Australia
Versavel 37'	Report	Slattery 4'; Fitzpatrick 19'; Morgan 24'; Ratcliffe 35'; Smith 53'

Umpires:
Annelize Rostron (RSA)
Amy Baxter (USA)

===== Seventh and eighth place =====
2 July 2017
11:15

Spain	1–1	Belgium
	Report
Penalties
Pérez (penalty shoot-out scored); Garcia (penalty shoot-out scored); Ybarra (penalty shoot-out scored); Bonastre (penalty shoot-out scored)	4–1	(penalty shoot-out missed) Versavel; (penalty shoot-out scored) Vanden Borre; (penalty shoot-out missed) Boon

Umpires:
Frances Block (ENG)
Emi Yamada (JPN)

===== Fifth and sixth place =====
2 July 2017
13:30

Italy	1–3	Australia
Carta 11'	Report	Slattery 22'; Morgan 48'; Ratcliffe 55'

Umpires:
Laurine Delforge (BEL)
Irene Presenqui (ARG)

==== First to fourth place classification ====
===== Semifinals =====
1 July 2017
15:45

South Korea	0–3	China
	Report	Gu 6'; Zhang Y. 25'; Liang 28'

Umpires:
Laurine Delforge (BEL)
Kylie Seymour (AUS)

1 July 2017
18:00

Netherlands	1–1	New Zealand
Van Maasakker 49'	Report	Pearce 34'
Penalties
De Waard (penalty shoot-out missed); Sanders (penalty shoot-out scored); Matla (penalty shoot-out missed); Leurink (penalty shoot-out scored); Van Geffen (penalty shoot-out scored); Matla (penalty shoot-out missed); Sanders (penalty shoot-out scored); Leurink (penalty shoot-out missed); Van Geffen (penalty shoot-out scored)	5–4	(penalty shoot-out scored) Charlton; (penalty shoot-out scored) Merry; (penalty shoot-out missed) Michelsen; (penalty shoot-out missed) Gunson; (penalty shoot-out scored) Thompson; (penalty shoot-out missed) Charlton; (penalty shoot-out scored) Thompson; (penalty shoot-out missed) Merry; (penalty shoot-out missed) Gunson

Umpires:
Frances Block (ENG)
Irene Presenqui (ARG)

===== Third and fourth place =====
2 July 2017
15:45

New Zealand	1–0	South Korea
Neal 54'	Report

Umpires:
Maggie Giddens (USA)
Annelize Rostron (RSA)

===== Final =====
2 July 2017
18:00

Netherlands	2–0	China
Van Maasakker 39', 48'	Report

Umpires:
Amber Church (NZL)
Kylie Seymour (AUS)

=== Awards ===
Top Goalscorer	Player of the Tournament	Goalkeeper of the Tournament	Young Player of the Tournament
(Netherlands) Caia van Maasakker	(China) Cui Qiuxia	(Italy) Martina Chirico	(Netherlands) Laura Nunnink

== Johannesburg ==

Tournament details
- Host country: South Africa
- City: Johannesburg
- Dates: 8–23 July 2017
- Teams: 10

Final positions
- Champions: United States
- Runner-up: Germany
- Third place: England

Tournament statistics
- Matches played: 33
- Goals scored: 88 (2.67 per match)
- Top scorer: (United States) Jill Witmer (5 goals)
- Best player: (United States) Melissa Gonzalez

All times are local (UTC+2).

=== First round ===
==== Pool A ====
Pos	Team	Pld	W	D	L	GF	GA	GD	Pts	Qualification
1	England	4	3	0	1	7	3	+4	9	Quarterfinals
2	Germany	4	2	1	1	6	3	+3	7	Quarterfinals
3	Japan	4	2	1	1	4	4	0	7	Quarterfinals
4	Ireland	4	1	2	1	7	6	+1	5	Quarterfinals
5	Poland	4	0	0	4	0	8	−8	0	

Source: FIH
Rules for classification: 1) points; 2) goal difference; 3) goals scored; 4) head-to-head result.

8 July 2017
12:00

Japan	1–1	Ireland
Oikawa 51'	Report	Upton 44'

Umpires:
Miskarmalia Ariffin (SGP)
Michelle Joubert (RSA)

8 July 2017
14:00

Germany	1–0	Poland
Gräve 42'	Report

Umpires:
Hafizah Azman Nor (MAS)
Suzi Sutton (USA)

10 July 2017
14:00

Germany	2–2	Ireland
Wortmann 56'; Lorenz 60'	Report	Wilson 14'; Duke 60'

Umpires:
Elena Eskina (RUS)
Kang Hyun-young (KOR)

10 July 2017
16:00

England	3–0	Poland
Bray 3', 14'; Danson 45'	Report

Umpires:
Hafizah Azman Nor (MAS)
Kelly Hudson (NZL)

12 July 2017
14:00

Ireland	2–0	Poland
Evans 10'; Pinder 39'	Report

Umpires:
Liu Xiaoying (CHN)
Suzi Sutton (USA)

12 July 2017
16:00

Japan	1–0	England
Karino 3'	Report

Umpires:
Michelle Joubert (RSA)
Aleisha Neumann (AUS)

14 July 2017
12:00

Poland	0–2	Japan
	Report	Nagai 36'; Nomura 56'

Umpires:
Miskarmilia Ariffin (SGP)
Ayanna McClean (TTO)

14 July 2017
18:00

Germany	0–1	England
	Report	Hunter 43'

Umpires:
Carolina de la Fuente (ARG)
Kang Hyun-young (KOR)

16 July 2017
12:00

Japan	0–3	Germany
	Report	Stapenhorst 23'; Lorenz 34'; Pieper 46'

Umpires:
Hafizah Azman Nor (MAS)
Elena Eskina (RUS)

16 July 2017
14:00

England	3–2	Ireland
Haycroft 14'; McCallin 27'; Danson 43'	Report	Daly 31'; Mullan 33'

Umpires:
Kelly Hudson (NZL)
Ayanna McClean (TTO)

==== Pool B ====
Pos	Team	Pld	W	D	L	GF	GA	GD	Pts	Qualification
1	Argentina	4	4	0	0	12	1	+11	12	Quarterfinals
2	United States	4	2	0	2	7	8	−1	6	Quarterfinals
3	South Africa (H)	4	1	1	2	4	6	−2	4	Quarterfinals
4	India	4	1	1	2	2	7	−5	4	Quarterfinals
5	Chile	4	1	0	3	1	4	−3	3	

Source: FIH
Rules for classification: 1) points; 2) goal difference; 3) goals scored; 4) head-to-head result.
(H) Hosts

8 July 2017
16:00

United States	1–0	Chile
Witmer 35'	Report

Umpires:
Elena Eskina (RUS)
Ayanna McClean (TTO)

8 July 2017
18:00

South Africa	0–0	India
	Report

Umpires:
Carolina de la Fuente (ARG)
Liu Xiaoying (CHN)

10 July 2017
12:00

Argentina	2–0	Chile
Barrionuevo 6'; A. Habif 28'	Report

Umpires:
Aleisha Neumann (AUS)
Suzi Sutton (USA)

10 July 2017
18:00

United States	4–1	India
Witmer 24', 43'; West 40'; Vittese 49'	Report	Minz 38'

Umpires:
Miskarmalia Ariffin (SGP)
Carolina de la Fuente (ARG)

12 July 2017
12:00

India	1–0	Chile
Dubey 38'	Report

Umpires:
Kelly Hudson (NZL)
Kang Hyun-young (KOR)

12 July 2017
18:00

South Africa	1–3	Argentina
Coston 28'	Report	Barrionuevo 41'; Merino 49'; F. Habif 58'

Umpires:
Elena Eskina (RUS)
Ayanna McClean (TTO)

14 July 2017
14:00

Chile	1–0	South Africa
Urroz 32'	Report

Umpires:
Hafizah Azman Nor (MAS)
Aleisha Neumann (AUS)

14 July 2017
16:00

United States	0–4	Argentina
	Report	Von der Heyde 29'; Cavallero 32'; A. Habif 33'; Jankunas 56'

Umpires:
Michelle Joubert (RSA)
Liu Xiaoying (CHN)

16 July 2017
16:00

South Africa	3–2	United States
Mayne 26'; Manuel 49', 51'	Report	González 14'; Witmer 44'

Umpires:
Kang Hyun-young (KOR)
Liu Xiaoying (CHN)

16 July 2017
18:00

Argentina	3–0	India
Sánchez Moccia 2'; Granatto 14'; Barrionuevo 25'	Report

Umpires:
Miskarmalia Ariffin (SGP)
Suzi Sutton (USA)

=== Second round ===
Fifth place
Japan	1
South Africa	2
Seventh place
India	1
Ireland	2

Consolation semifinals
India	0
Japan	2
South Africa	3
Ireland	0

Quarterfinals
England	4
India	1
United States	1
Japan	0
Germany	1
South Africa	0
Argentina	2
Ireland	1

Semifinals
England	1 (1)
United States (p.s.o.)	1 (2)
Germany	2
Argentina	1

Final
United States (p.s.o.)	1 (3)
Germany	1 (2)
Third place
England	5
Argentina	2

==== Quarterfinals ====
18 July 2017
11:15

United States	1–0	Japan
Vittese 42'	Report

Umpires:
Hafizah Azman Nor (MAS)
Liu Xiaoying (CHN)

18 July 2017
13:30

Argentina	2–1	Ireland
Merino 25'; Gomes Fantasia 40'	Report	Upton 43'

Umpires:
Aleisha Neumann (AUS)
Suzi Sutton (USA)

18 July 2017
15:45

England	4–1	India
Ansley 6'; Danson 13'; Townsend 42'; Martin 60'	Report	G. Kaur 46'

Umpires:
Michelle Joubert (RSA)
Ayanna McClean (TRI)

18 July 2017
18:00

Germany	1–0	South Africa
Nobis 29'	Report

Umpires:
Carolina de la Fuente (ARG)
Kelly Hudson (NZL)

==== Ninth and tenth place ====
20 July 2017
10:00

Poland	1–2	Chile
Rybacha 6'	Report	Urroz 20'; Caram 27'

Umpires:
Miskarmalia Ariffin (SGP)
Hafizah Azman Nor (MAS)

==== Fifth to eighth place classification ====
===== Crossover =====
20 July 2017
12:15

India	0–2	Japan
	Report	Nomura 7'; Ichitani 29'

Umpires:
Kang Hyun-young (KOR)
Liu Xiaoying (CHN)

20 July 2017
14:30

South Africa	3–0	Ireland
Deetlefs 23'; Coston 49'; Du Plessis 55'	Report

Umpires:
Kelly Hudson (NZL)
Aleisha Neumann (AUS)

===== Seventh and eighth place =====
22 July 2017
11:15

India	1–2	Ireland
G. Kaur 15'	Report	Mullan 47'; Colvin 48'

Umpires:
Elena Eskina (RUS)
Kelly Hudson (NZL)

===== Fifth and sixth place =====
22 July 2017
13:30

Japan	1–2	South Africa
Nagai 35'	Report	Du Plessis 18'; Glasby 23'

Umpires:
Ayanna McClean (TTO)
Suzi Sutton (USA)

==== First to fourth place classification ====
===== Semifinals =====
20 July 2017
16:45

Germany	2–1	Argentina
Heyn 7'; Stapenhorst 30'	Report	Von der Heyde 16'

Umpires:
Michelle Joubert (RSA)
Suzi Sutton (USA)

20 July 2017
19:00

England	1–1	United States
Martin 16'	Report	Witmer 57'
Penalties
Danson (penalty shoot-out missed); Webb (penalty shoot-out missed); Bray (penalty shoot-out missed); Unsworth (penalty shoot-out missed); Haycroft (penalty shoot-out scored); Danson (penalty shoot-out missed)	1–2	(penalty shoot-out scored) González; (penalty shoot-out missed) Vittese; (penalty shoot-out missed) Sharkey; (penalty shoot-out missed) Manley; (penalty shoot-out missed) Matson; (penalty shoot-out scored) González

Umpires:
Elena Eskina (RUS)
Carolina de la Fuente (ARG)

===== Third and fourth place =====
23 July 2017
11:00

England	5–2	Argentina
Bray 12'; Townsend 27'; Unsworth 35'; Ansley 48', 50'	Report	Von der Heyde 20'; Merino 30'

Umpires:
Liu Xiaoying (CHN)
Aleisha Neumann (AUS)

===== Final =====
23 July 2017
15:30

United States	1–1	Germany
West 58'	Report	Nobis 38'
Penalties
González (penalty shoot-out scored); Vittese (penalty shoot-out scored); Sharkey (penalty shoot-out missed); Manley (penalty shoot-out missed); Matson (penalty shoot-out scored)	3–2	(penalty shoot-out scored) Müller-Wieland; (penalty shoot-out missed) Lorenz; (penalty shoot-out scored) Mävers; (penalty shoot-out missed) Teschke; (penalty shoot-out missed) Hauke

Umpires:
Carolina de la Fuente (ARG)
Michelle Joubert (RSA)

=== Awards ===
Top Goalscorer	Player of the Tournament	Goalkeeper of the Tournament	Young Player of the Tournament
(United States) Jill Witmer	(United States) Melissa González	(United States) Jackie Briggs	(Germany) Nike Lorenz

== Final standings ==
Qualification for 2018 Hockey World Cup

Rank	Brussels	Johannesburg
1	Netherlands	United States
2	China	Germany
3	New Zealand	England
4	South Korea	Argentina
5	Australia	South Africa
6	Italy	Japan
7	Spain	Ireland
8	Belgium	India
9	Scotland	Chile
10	Malaysia	Poland

Host nation
Continental champions
Qualified through FIH Hockey World League

== Goalscorers ==
The following goalscorers list comprises players from both events.

There were 183 goals scored in 66 matches, for an average of 2.77 goals per match.

7 goals

- (Netherlands) Caia van Maasakker

5 goals

- (Australia) Georgina Morgan
- (South Korea) Cheon Seul-Ki
- (United States) Jill Witmer

4 goals

- (Australia) Kathryn Slattery
- (China) Gu Bingfeng

3 goals

- (Argentina) Noel Barrionuevo
- (Argentina) Delfina Merino
- (Argentina) Lucina von der Heyde
- (Australia) Madison Fitzpatrick
- (Belgium) Anouk Raes
- (England) Giselle Ansley
- (England) Sophie Bray
- (England) Alex Danson
- (Netherlands) Kitty van Male
- (Netherlands) Charlotte Vega
- (New Zealand) Brooke Neal

2 goals

- (Argentina) Agustina Habif
- (Australia) Madeleine Ratcliffe
- (Australia) Emily Smith
- (Belgium) Jill Boon
- (Belgium) Emma Puvrez
- (Belgium) Stéphanie Vanden Borre
- (Belgium) Louise Versavel
- (Chile) Manuela Urroz
- (China) Liang Meiyu
- (China) Wu Mengrong
- (England) Hannah Martin
- (England) Susannah Townsend
- (Germany) Nike Lorenz
- (Germany) Camille Nobis
- (Germany) Charlotte Stapenhorst
- (India) Gurjit Kaur
- (Ireland) Kathryn Mullan
- (Ireland) Roisin Upton
- (Japan) Kana Nomura
- (Netherlands) Laurien Leurink
- (Netherlands) Frédérique Matla
- (Netherlands) Margot van Geffen
- (New Zealand) Olivia Merry
- (South Africa) Bernadette Coston
- (South Africa) Lilian du Plessis
- (South Africa) Candice Manuel
- (South Korea) Cheon Eun-Bi
- (Spain) Lucía Jiménez
- (Spain) Lola Riera
- (United States) Michelle Vittese
- (United States) Taylor West

1 goal

- (Argentina) Martina Cavallero
- (Argentina) Julia Gomes Fantasia
- (Argentina) María Granatto
- (Argentina) Florencia Habif
- (Argentina) Julieta Jankunas
- (Argentina) Rocío Sánchez Moccia
- (Belgium) Aline Fobe
- (Belgium) Anne-Sophie Weyns
- (Chile) Camila Caram
- (China) Zhang Ying
- (England) Sarah Haycroft
- (England) Jo Hunter
- (England) Shona McCallin
- (England) Laura Unsworth
- (Germany) Elisa Gräve
- (Germany) Naomi Heyn
- (Germany) Cécile Pieper
- (Germany) Amelie Wortmann
- (India) Preeti Dubey
- (India) Lilima Minz
- (Ireland) Lizzie Colvin
- (Ireland) Nicola Daly
- (Ireland) Deirdre Duke
- (Ireland) Nicola Evans
- (Ireland) Gillian Pinder
- (Ireland) Zoe Wilson
- (Italy) Federica Carta
- (Italy) Eugenia Mastronardi
- (Italy) Lara Oviedo
- (Italy) Elisabetta Pacella
- (Italy) Jasbeer Singh
- (Italy) Agata Wybieralska
- (Japan) Mami Karino
- (Japan) Naho Ichitani
- (Japan) Hazuki Nagai
- (Japan) Yuri Nagai
- (Japan) Shihori Oikawa
- (Malaysia) Siti Ruhani
- (Netherlands) Xan de Waard
- (Netherlands) Marloes Keetels
- (Netherlands) Maartje Krekelaar
- (Netherlands) Lauren Stam
- (Netherlands) Ireen van den Assem
- (New Zealand) Samantha Charlton
- (New Zealand) Samantha Harrison
- (New Zealand) Kirsten Pearce
- (Poland) Marlena Rybacha
- (Scotland) Kate Holmes
- (Scotland) Rebecca Merchant
- (Scotland) Sarah Robertson
- (South Africa) Lisa-Marie Deetlefs
- (South Africa) Tarryn Glasby
- (South Africa) Jade Mayne
- (South Korea) Shin Hye-Jeong
- (Spain) Berta Bonastre
- (Spain) Carola Salvatella
- (Spain) Rocío Ybarra
- (United States) Melissa González

Source: Brussels Johannesburg
