= Field hockey at the 2018 Asian Games =

Field Hockey tournament in Jakarta, Indonesia

- Venue: GBK Hockey Field
- Location: Jakarta, Indonesia
- Dates: 19 August – 1 September
- Competitors: 396 from 14 nations

Champions
- Men: Japan
- Women: Japan

Field hockey at the 2018 Asian Games in Jakarta and Palembang was held at the GBK Hockey Field, Jakarta, Indonesia from 19 August to 1 September 2018. A total of twelve men's and ten women's teams competed in each respective tournament.

The tournaments served as qualification for the 2020 Summer Olympics.

== Competition schedule ==
All times are local Indonesia Western Standard Time (UTC+7).

P	Preliminary round	½	Semi-finals	B	Bronze medal match	F	Gold medal match

Date Event	Sun 19	Mon 20	Tue 21	Wed 22	Thu 23	Fri 24	Sat 25	Sun 26	Mon 27	Tue 28	Wed 29	Thu 30	Fri 31		Sat 1	
Men		P		P		P		P		P		½			B	F
Women	P		P		P		P		P		½		B	F		

== Medal summary ==
=== Medal table ===
Rank	Nation	Gold	Silver	Bronze	Total
1	Japan (JPN)	2	0	0	2
2	India (IND)	0	1	1	2
3	Malaysia (MAS)	0	1	0	1
4	China (CHN)	0	0	1	1
Totals (4 entries)		2	2	2	6

=== Medalists ===
Event	Gold	Silver	Bronze
Men	Japan; Koji Yamasaki; Genki Mitani; Seren Tanaka; Hiromasa Ochiai; Kazuma Murata; Suguru Hoshi; Kenta Tanaka; Kenji Kitazato; Manabu Yamashita; Kaito Tanaka; Kentaro Fukuda; Masaki Ohashi; Shota Yamada; Yusuke Takano; Hirotaka Zendana; Takashi Yoshikawa; Kota Watanabe; Yoshiki Kirishita	Malaysia; Marhan Jalil; Fitri Saari; Joel van Huizen; Faizal Saari; Syed Syafiq Syed Cholan; Sukri Mutalib; Firhan Ashaari; Amirul Aideed; Nabil Fiqri; Kumar Subramaniam; Razie Rahim; Faiz Helmi Jali; Azri Hassan; Meor Azuan Hassan; Tengku Ahmad Tajuddin; Nik Aiman Nik Rozemi; Shahril Saabah; Hairi Rahman	India; Harmanpreet Singh; Dilpreet Singh; Rupinder Pal Singh; Surender Kumar; Manpreet Singh; Sardara Singh; Simranjeet Singh; Mandeep Singh; Lalit Upadhyay; P. R. Sreejesh; Krishan Pathak; Varun Kumar; S. V. Sunil; Birendra Lakra; Akashdeep Singh; Chinglensana Singh; Amit Rohidas; Vivek Prasad
Women	Japan; Megumi Kageyama; Natsuki Naito; Akiko Ota; Emi Nishikori; Shihori Oikawa; Kimika Hoshi; Mayumi Ono; Yukari Mano; Akiko Kato; Hazuki Nagai; Minami Shimizu; Yuri Nagai; Aki Yamada; Maho Segawa; Yui Ishibashi; Mami Karino; Motomi Kawamura; Akio Tanaka	India; Navjot Kaur; Gurjit Kaur; Deep Grace Ekka; Monika Malik; Reena Khokhar; Nikki Pradhan; Savita Punia; Rajani Etimarpu; Vandana Katariya; Deepika Thakur; Udita; Namita Toppo; Lalremsiami; Navneet Kaur; Sunita Lakra; Rani Rampal; Lilima Minz; Neha Goyal	China; Gu Bingfeng; Song Xiaoming; Li Jiaqi; Cui Qiuxia; Zhou Yu; Peng Yang; Liang Meiyu; Li Hong; Zhang Jinrong; Ou Zixia; Zhang Xiaoxue; He Jiangxin; Chen Yi; De Jiaojiao; Xi Xiayun; Chen Yi; Dan Wen; Ye Jiao

== Qualification ==
=== Men's qualification ===
Event	Dates	Location	Quotas	Qualifier(s)
Host	19 September 2014	(South Korea) Incheon	1	Indonesia
Qualified automatically via 2014 Asian Games	20 September – 2 October 2014	(South Korea) Incheon	5	India; Pakistan; South Korea; Malaysia; ~~China~~; Japan
Asian Games Qualifiers	8–17 March 2018	(Oman) Muscat	4	Oman; Bangladesh; Sri Lanka; Thailand; ~~Chinese Taipei~~
Reallocation	—N/a	—N/a	2	Kazakhstan; Hong Kong
Total			12	

=== Women's qualification ===
Means of qualification	Dates	Venue	Berths	Qualified
Host country	19 September 2014	(Indonesia) Jakarta	1	Indonesia
2014 Asian Games	20 September – 2 October 2014	(South Korea) Incheon	5	South Korea
2014 Asian Games	20 September – 2 October 2014	(South Korea) Incheon	5	China
2014 Asian Games	20 September – 2 October 2014	(South Korea) Incheon	5	India
2014 Asian Games	20 September – 2 October 2014	(South Korea) Incheon	5	Japan
2014 Asian Games	20 September – 2 October 2014	(South Korea) Incheon	5	Malaysia
Asian Games Qualifiers	12–20 January 2018	(Thailand) Bangkok	4	Thailand
Asian Games Qualifiers	12–20 January 2018	(Thailand) Bangkok	4	Hong Kong
Asian Games Qualifiers	12–20 January 2018	(Thailand) Bangkok	4	Chinese Taipei
Asian Games Qualifiers	12–20 January 2018	(Thailand) Bangkok	4	Kazakhstan
Total			10	

== Men's competition ==
The competition consisted of two stages; a preliminary round followed by a final round.

=== Preliminary round ===
==== Pool A ====
Pos	Team	Pld	W	D	L	PF	PA	PD	Pts	Qualification
1	India	5	5	0	0	76	3	+73	15	Semi-finals
2	Japan	5	4	0	1	30	11	+19	12	Semi-finals
3	South Korea	5	3	0	2	39	8	+31	9	Fifth place game
4	Sri Lanka	5	2	0	3	7	41	−34	6	Seventh place game
5	Indonesia (H)	5	1	0	4	5	40	−35	3	Ninth place game
6	Hong Kong	5	0	0	5	3	57	−54	0	Eleventh place game

Source: FIH
Rules for classification: 1) points; 2) goal difference; 3) goals scored; 4) head-to-head result.
(H) Hosts

==== Pool B ====
Pos	Team	Pld	W	D	L	PF	PA	PD	Pts	Qualification
1	Pakistan	5	5	0	0	45	1	+44	15	Semi-finals
2	Malaysia	5	4	0	1	41	6	+35	12	Semi-finals
3	Bangladesh	5	3	0	2	11	15	−4	9	Fifth place game
4	Oman	5	2	0	3	7	19	−12	6	Seventh place game
5	Thailand	5	1	0	4	4	27	−23	3	Ninth place game
6	Kazakhstan	5	0	0	5	5	45	−40	0	Eleventh place game

Source: FIH
Rules for classification: 1) points; 2) goal difference; 3) goals scored; 4) head-to-head result.

=== Final round ===
Semi-finals
30 August
India	2 (6)
Malaysia (p.s.o.)	2 (7)
30 August
Pakistan	0
Japan	1

Gold medal match
1 September
Malaysia	6 (1)
Japan (p.s.o.)	6 (3)
Bronze medal match
1 September
India	2
Pakistan	1

== Women's competition ==
The competition consisted of two stages; a preliminary round followed by a final round.

=== Preliminary round ===
==== Pool A ====
Pos	Team	Pld	W	D	L	PF	PA	PD	Pts	Qualification
1	Japan	4	4	0	0	24	3	+21	12	Semifinals
2	China	4	2	1	1	28	6	+22	7	Semifinals
3	Malaysia	4	2	1	1	22	5	+17	7	5th place game
4	Chinese Taipei	4	1	0	3	3	33	−30	3	7th place game
5	Hong Kong	4	0	0	4	2	32	−30	0	9th place game

Source: FIH
Rules for classification: 1) points; 2) goal difference; 3) goals scored; 4) head-to-head result.

==== Pool B ====
Pos	Team	Pld	W	D	L	PF	PA	PD	Pts	Qualification
1	India	4	4	0	0	38	1	+37	12	Semifinals
2	South Korea	4	3	0	1	17	4	+13	9	Semifinals
3	Thailand	4	1	0	3	3	11	−8	3	5th place game
4	Indonesia (H)	4	1	0	3	2	16	−14	3	7th place game
5	Kazakhstan	4	1	0	3	4	32	−28	3	9th place game

Source: FIH
Rules for classification: 1) points; 2) goal difference; 3) goals scored; 4) head-to-head result.
(H) Hosts

=== Final round ===
Semi-finals
29 August
Japan	2
South Korea	0
29 August
India	1
China	0

Gold medal match
31 August
Japan	2
India	1
Bronze medal match
31 August
South Korea	1
China	2
