= Udita Duhan =

Indian field hockey player

Personal information
- Born: 14 January 1998 (age 28) Hisar district, Haryana, India
- Height: 1.58 m (5 ft 2 in)
- Weight: 54 kg (119 lb)
- Spouse: Mandeep Singh (m. 2025)

Sport
- Sport: Field hockey
- Position: Midfielder
Youth career
- Years: Team
- 2016–: India U18
Senior career
Years	Team	Caps	Goals
2016–	Hockey Haryana	-	-
2025–	Rarh Bengal Tigers	-	-
National team
Years	Team	Caps	Goals
2016	India U21	4	(0)
2017–	India	138	(17)
Medal record
Women's field hockey
Representing India
Nations Cup
Gold medal – first place	2022 Spain
Commonwealth Games
Bronze medal – third place	2022 Birmingham	Team
Asian Games
Silver medal – second place	2018 Jakarta	Team
Bronze medal – third place	2022 Hangzhou	Team
Asia Cup
Silver medal – second place	2025 Hangzhou
Bronze medal – third place	2022 Muscat
Asian Champions Trophy
Gold medal – first place	2023 Ranchi
Gold medal – first place	2024 Rajgir
Silver medal – second place	2018 Donghae
Girls' Asia Cup
Bronze medal – third place	2016 Bangkok

Udita Duhan (born 14 January 1998) is an Indian field hockey player and member of national team. She plays as a defender.

In 2024, during the Hockey India League auctions, Rarh Bengal Tigers acquired her for ₹32 lakhs. She is the most expensive player in the women's edition of the league.

== Early life ==
Duhan was born in Bhiwani's Nangal village, Hisar district, Haryana. Her father, Jasbir Singh, was a police officer and also a handball player. She started playing handball but later shifted to hockey. After her father died in 2015, her mother Geetha Devi encouraged her to continue hockey and soon she joined SAI hostel.

== Personal life ==
In March 2025, she married Indian field hockey player Mandeep Singh.

== Career ==
- 2016: Bronze at Youth Asia Cup, Bangkok.
- 2018: Silver at Asian Games, Jakarta.
- 2018: Silver at Asian Champions Trophy in Donghae.
- 2018: She participated at the 2018 Women's Hockey World Cup.
- 2021: She took part in the Tokyo Olympics 2020 played from 23 July to 8 August 2021.
- 2022: Bronze at Asia Cup, Muscat.
- 2022: She was part of the team that won bronze at the 2022 Commonwealth Games.

== Awards and nominations ==
Year	Award	Category	Result	Ref.
2025	Hockey India Awards	Defender of the Year	Nominated	
