= Li Jiaqi (field hockey) =

Chinese field hockey player

Personal information
- Born: 2 July 1995 (age 31) Dalian, Liaoning, China
- Height: 1.68 m (5 ft 6 in)
- Weight: 63 kg (139 lb)

Sport
- Sport: Field hockey
Medal record
Women's field hockey
Representing China
Asian Games
Gold medal – first place	2022 Hangzhou	Team
Bronze medal – third place	2018 Jakarta	Team
Asian Champions Trophy
Bronze medal – third place	2018 Donghae
Girls' Asia Cup
Silver medal – second place	2011 Bangkok

Li Jiaqi (Chinese: 李佳琦, born 2 July 1995) is a Chinese field hockey player. She competed for the China women's national field hockey team at the 2016 Summer Olympics.
