= Neha Goyal =

Indian field hockey player

- Goyal in August 2022

Personal information
- Born: 15 November 1996 (age 29) Sonipat, Haryana, India
- Height: 1.52 m (5 ft 0 in)
- Weight: 54 kg (119 lb)

Sport
- Sport: Field hockey
- Position: Midfielder
Senior career
Years	Team	Caps	Goals
–	Hockey Haryana	-	-
–	Railways	-	-
2025–	Odisha Warriors	-	-
National team
Years	Team	Caps	Goals
2011–	India U18		-
2014–	India	215	(26)
Medal record
Women's field hockey
Representing India
Asian Games
Gold medal – first place	2026 Aichi–Nagoya	Team
Silver medal – second place	2018 Jakarta	Team
Bronze medal – third place	2022 Hangzhou	Team
Commonwealth Games
Bronze medal – third place	2022 Birmingham	Team
Asia Cup
Gold medal – first place	2017 Gifu
Silver medal – second place	2025 Hangzhou
Bronze medal – third place	2022 Muscat
Asian Champions Trophy
Gold medal – first place	2023 Ranchi
Gold medal – first place	2024 Rajgir
Silver medal – second place	2018 Donghae
FIH Nations Cup
Gold medal – first place	2022 Spain
South Asian Games
Gold medal – first place	2016 Guwahati	Team
Girls' Asia Cup
Bronze medal – third place	2011 Bangkok

Neha Goyal (born 15 November 1996) is an Indian field hockey player and is a member of the India national team. She plays as a midfielder. She captains the Odisha Warriors in Hockey India League.

== Early life ==
Goyal was born in Sonipat in Haryana. She comes from a poor family and has two elder sisters. Her father was an alcoholic and her mother as a daily wage worker in a cycle factory earning ₹2000/month making spoke. She and her family have struggled to take care of her basic requirements like shoes, hockey sticks, diet regime, etc.

Goyal started playing hockey when she was 11.

Goyal began training in an academy run by former India captain Pritam Rani Siwach. Goyal completed her schooling from Tika Ram Senior Secondary Girls School.

== Career ==
Goyal made her debut in the senior Indian national team in 2014 and played her first match in Glasgow during the FIH Champions Challenge.

Goyal was part of the 18-member Indian team for the 2018 World Cup in London. In their opening match, India played against the host England, where Goyal gave India the lead in 25th minute before England equalised it and the match ended in a draw.
