= Lara Oviedo =

Italian-Argentine field hockey player (born 1988)

Personal information
- Born: 12 April 1988 (age 38) Argentina
- Height: 165 cm (5 ft 5 in)
- Weight: 56 kg (123 lb)

Sport
- Sport: Field hockey
- Position: Forward
- Club: Gantoise H.C
National team
Years	Team	Caps	Goals
2014–2015	Argentina	4	-
2017–	Italy	22	-

Lara Oviedo (born 12 April 1988) is an Italian-Argentine field hockey player.

== Personal life ==
Oviedo was born in Argentina to an Italian Argentine family.

== Hockey career ==
In 2017, Oviedo was called into the Italian senior national women's team. She competed in the team that finished fifth at the 2016–17 Hockey World League Semifinals in Brussels.
