= Ye Jiao =

Chinese field hockey player

Personal information
- Born: 21 October 1994 (age 32) Chengdu, Sichuan, China
- Height: 1.78 m (5 ft 10 in)
- Weight: 66 kg (146 lb)

Sport
- Sport: Field hockey
- Position: Goalkeeper
National team
| Years | Team | Caps | Goals |
| 2013– | China | 41 | (0) |
Medal record
Women's field hockey
Representing China
Olympic Games
| Silver medal – second place | 2024 Paris | Team |
Asian Games
| Gold medal – first place | 2022 Hangzhou | Team |
| Bronze medal – third place | 2018 Jakarta | Team |
Girls' Asia Cup
| Silver medal – second place | 2011 Bangkok |

Ye Jiao (born 21 October 1994) is a Chinese field hockey player for the Chinese national team.

She participated at the 2018 Women's Hockey World Cup.
