= Federica Carta (field hockey) =

Italian field hockey player (born 2000)

Personal information
- Born: 21 June 2000 (age 26)

Sport
- Sport: Field hockey
- Position: Forward
- Club: S.G. Amsicora Cagliari
National team
Years	Team	Caps	Goals
–	Italy	22	-

Federica Carta (born 21 June 2000) is an Italian field hockey player who plays for the Italian national team.

She participated at the 2018 Women's Hockey World Cup.
