= Reena Khokhar =

Indian field hockey player

Personal information
- Born: 10 April 1993 (age 33) Punjab, India
- Height: 1.63 m (5 ft 4 in)
- Weight: 58 kg (128 lb)

Sport
- Sport: Field hockey
- Position: Forward
- Club: Railways
Senior career
Years	Team	Caps	Goals
–	Madhya Pradesh; Hockey Academy	-	-
–	Railways	-	-
National team
Years	Team	Caps	Goals
2017–	India	48	(1)
Medal record
Women's field hockey
Representing India
Asian Games
Silver medal – second place	2018 Jakarta	Team

Reena Khokhar (born 10 April 1993) is an Indian professional field hockey player who plays as a forward for the Indian national team. She was a part of the 18-member squad that represented India at the 2018 World Cup making her comeback in the side.

At the club level, Khokhar plays for Madhya Pradesh Hockey Academy.
