= Natsuki Naito =

Japanese field hockey player

Personal information
- Born: 21 April 1991 (age 35)
- Height: 1.65 m (5 ft 5 in)
- Weight: 56 kg (123 lb)

Sport
- Sport: Field hockey
National team
Years	Team	Caps	Goals
2018–	Japan	43	-
Medal record
Women's field hockey
Representing Japan
Asian Games
Gold medal – first place	2018 Jakarta	Team
Asian Champions Trophy
Bronze medal – third place	2016 Singapore

Natsuki Naito (born 24 April 1991) is a Japanese field hockey player for the Japanese national team.

She participated at the 2018 Women's Hockey World Cup.
