= Eugenia Bianchi =

Italian-Argentine field hockey player (born 1990)

Personal information
- Born: 15 January 1990 (age 36) Buenos Aires, Argentina
- Height: 1.67 m (5 ft 6 in)

Sport
- Sport: Field hockey
- Position: Defender
- Club: Hockey Club Argentia
National team
Years	Team	Caps	Goals
–	Italy	58	-

Eugenia Bianchi (born 15 January 1990) is an Italian-Argentine field hockey player for the Italian national team. Born in Buenos Aires, Argentina. She started her professional field hockey career in 2015.

She participated at the 2018 Women's Hockey World Cup. - Kuala Lumpur World League 2017 - Brussels World League 2017 - Cardiff European Championship II 2017 - London World Cup 2018 - Valencia World Series 2019 - Glasgow European Championship II 2019
