= Emi Nishikori =

Japanese field hockey player

Medal record

Women's field hockey

Representing Japan

Asian Games
Gold medal – first place	2018 Jakarta	Team

Asian Cup
Bronze medal – third place	2025 Hangzhou	

Asian Champions Trophy
Bronze medal – third place	2016 Singapore	

Emi Nishikori (錦織 えみ, Nishikōri Emi; born January 9, 1993) is a Japanese field hockey player. She competed for the Japan women's national field hockey team at the 2016 Summer Olympics.
