= Song Xiaoming =

Chinese field hockey player

Personal information
- Born: 4 March 1994 (age 32)
- Height: 1.69 m (5 ft 7 in)
- Weight: 60 kg (132 lb)

Sport
- Sport: Field hockey
National team
Years	Team	Caps	Goals
2017–	China	25	-
Medal record
Women's field hockey
Representing China
Asian Games
Bronze medal – third place	2018 Jakarta	Team
Asian Champions Trophy
Bronze medal – third place	2018 Donghae
Girls' Asia Cup
Silver medal – second place	2011 Bangkok

Song Xiaoming (4 March 1994) is a Chinese field hockey player for the Chinese national team.

She participated at the 2018 Women's Hockey World Cup.
