= Aki Yamada =

Japanese field hockey player

Personal information
- Born: 24 November 1992 (age 33)
- Height: 1.63 m (5 ft 4 in)
- Weight: 54 kg (119 lb)

Sport
- Sport: Field hockey
National team
Years	Team	Caps	Goals
2009–	Japan	50	-
Medal record
Women's field hockey
Representing Japan
Asian Games
Gold medal – first place	2018 Jakarta	Team competition

Aki Yamada (山田 明季, Yamada Aki; born 24 November 1992) is a Japanese field hockey player for the Japanese national team.

She participated at the [[2018 Women's Hockey World Cup 2020Tokyo Olympics]].
