= Maho Segawa =

Japanese field hockey player

Personal information
- Born: 23 June 1996 (age 30)
- Height: 1.61 m (5 ft 3 in)
- Weight: 53 kg (117 lb)

Sport
- Sport: Field hockey
National team
Years	Team	Caps	Goals
2016–	Japan	35	-
Medal record
Women's field hockey
Representing Japan
Asian Games
Gold medal – first place	2018 Jakarta	Team
Asia Cup
Gold medal – first place	2022 Muscat
Asian Champions Trophy
Gold medal – first place	2021 Donghae

Maho Segawa (瀬川 真帆, Segawa Maho; born 23 June 1996) is a Japanese field hockey player for the Japanese national team.

She participated at the 2018 Women's Hockey World Cup.
