= Zhang Xiaoxue =

Chinese field hockey player

Personal information
- Born: 13 December 1992 (age 33)
- Height: 1.62 m (5 ft 4 in)
- Weight: 54 kg (119 lb)

Sport
- Sport: Field hockey
National team
Years	Team	Caps	Goals
2013–	China	111	-
Medal record
Women's field hockey
Representing China
Asian Games
Gold medal – first place	2022 Hangzhou	Team
Silver medal – second place	2014 Incheon	Team
Bronze medal – third place	2018 Jakarta	Team
Asian Champions Trophy
Bronze medal – third place	2018 Donghae

Zhang Xiaoxue (born 13 December 1992) is a Chinese field hockey player. She competed for the China women's national field hockey team at the 2016 Summer Olympics.

She won a silver medal as a member of the Chinese team at 2014 Asian Games.
