= Cho Eun-ji =

South Korean field hockey player (born 1989)

Personal information
- Born: 30 November 1989 (age 36)
- Height: 1.65 m (5 ft 5 in)
- Weight: 60 kg (132 lb)

Sport
- Sport: Field hockey
- Club: Mokpo-si
Youth career
- Team
- –: Gimhae Girls' High School
- –: Inje University
Senior career
| Years | Team | Caps | Goals |
| – | Asan-si | - | - |
| – | Mokpo-si | - | - |
National team
| Years | Team | Caps | Goals |
| 2013– | South Korea | 112 | - |
Medal record
Women's field hockey
Representing South Korea
Asian Games
| Gold medal – first place | 2014 Incheon | Team |
| Silver medal – second place | 2022 Hangzhou | Team |
Asia Cup
| Bronze medal – third place | 2017 Gifu |
Asian Champions Trophy
| Gold medal – first place | 2011 Ordos |
| Gold medal – first place | 2018 Donghae |

- Cho Eun-ji
- Hangul: 조은지
- RR: Jo Eunji
- MR: Cho Ŭnji

Cho Eun-ji (born 30 November 1989) is a South Korean field hockey player for the South Korean national team.

She participated at the 2018 Women's Hockey World Cup.

She won a gold medal as a member of the South Korean team at 2014 Asian Games.
