= Cho Yun-kyoung =

South Korean field hockey player

Personal information
- Born: 20 August 1991 (age 34)
- Height: 1.64 m (5 ft 5 in)
- Weight: 61 kg (134 lb)

Sport
- Sport: Field hockey
National team
| Years | Team | Caps | Goals |
| 2017– | South Korea | 90 | - |
Medal record
Women's field hockey
Representing South Korea
Asian Champions Trophy
| Gold medal – first place | 2018 Donghae |

Cho Yun-kyoung (born 20 August 1991) is a South Korean field hockey player for the South Korean national team.

She participated at the 2018 Women's Hockey World Cup.
