= Monika Malik =

Indian field hockey player

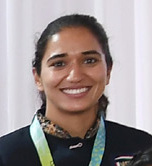
- Malik in August 2022

Personal information
- Born: 5 November 1993 (age 32) Haryana, India
- Height: 1.62 m (5 ft 4 in)
- Weight: 51 kg (112 lb)
- Spouse: Akashdeep Singh (m. 2024)

Sport
- Sport: Field hockey
- Position: Defender
- Club: Railways
Senior career
Years	Team	Caps	Goals
–	Central Railways	-	-
–	Railways	-	-
National team
Years	Team	Caps	Goals
2012–2013	India U21		-
2012–	India	229	(18)
Medal record
Women's field hockey
Representing India
Asian Games
Silver medal – second place	2018 Jakarta	Team
Bronze medal – third place	2014 Incheon	Team
Bronze medal – third place	2022 Hangzhou	Team
Commonwealth Games
Bronze medal – third place	2022 Birmingham	Team
Asia Cup
Gold medal – first place	2017 Gifu
Bronze medal – third place	2022 Muscat
Asian Champions Trophy
Gold medal – first place	2016 Singapore
Gold medal – first place	2023 Ranchi
Silver medal – second place	2013 Kakamigahara
Silver medal – second place	2018 Donghae
FIH Nations Cup
Gold medal – first place	2022 Spain
Junior World Cup
Bronze medal – third place	2013 Mönchengladbach
Junior Asia Cup
Silver medal – second place	2012 Bangkok

Monika Malik (born 5 November 1993), known mononymously as Monika, is an Indian field hockey player who represented India in the 2014 Asian Games and was part of the bronze medal-winning squad. She is currently employed with the Indian Railways.

== See also ==
- List of Indian sportswomen
