= Akiko Kato =

Japanese field hockey player

Personal information
- Born: 9 May 1988 (age 38)
- Height: 1.49 m (4 ft 11 in)
- Weight: 52 kg (115 lb)

Sport
- Sport: Field hockey
National team
Years	Team	Caps	Goals
2014–	Japan	61	-
Medal record
Women's field hockey
Representing Japan
Asian Games
Gold medal – first place	2018 Jakarta	Team competition

Akiko Kato (加藤 彰子, Katō Akiko; born 9 May 1988) is a Japanese field hockey player for the Japanese national team.

She participated at the 2018 Women's Hockey World Cup.
