= Park Seung-a =

South Korean field hockey player

Personal information
- Born: 16 April 1991 (age 35) Suwon, South Korea
- Height: 1.68 m (5 ft 6 in)
- Weight: 62 kg (137 lb)

Sport
- Sport: Field hockey
National team
Years	Team	Caps	Goals
–	South Korea	98	-
Medal record
Women's field hockey
Representing South Korea
Asia Cup
Silver medal – second place	2013 Kuala Lumpur
Bronze medal – third place	2017 Gifu
Asian Champions Trophy
Gold medal – first place	2018 Donghae

Park Seung-a (born 16 April 1991) is a South Korean field hockey player. She competed for the South Korea women's national field hockey team at the 2016 Summer Olympics.
