= Zhang Jinrong =

Chinese field hockey player

Medal record

Women's field hockey

Representing China

Asian Games
Bronze medal – third place	2018 Jakarta	Team

Asian Champions Trophy
Silver medal – second place	2016 Singapore	
Bronze medal – third place	2018 Donghae	

Zhang Jinrong (born March 24, 1997) is a Chinese field hockey player. She competed for the China women's national field hockey team at the 2016 Summer Olympics.
