= Kim Ok-ju =

South Korean field hockey player (born 1988)

Personal information
- Born: 20 February 1988 (age 38) Seoul, South Korea
- Height: 1.63 m (5 ft 4 in)
- Weight: 56 kg (123 lb)

Sport
- Sport: Field hockey
National team
Years	Team	Caps	Goals
–	South Korea	139	-
Medal record
Women's field hockey
Representing South Korea
Asian Games
Gold medal – first place	2014 Incheon	Team
Silver medal – second place	2010 Guangzhou	Team
Asia Cup
Bronze medal – third place	2009 Bangkok
Asian Champions Trophy
Gold medal – first place	2010 Busan
Gold medal – first place	2011 Ordos
Gold medal – first place	2018 Donghae

Kim Ok-ju (born 20 February 1988) is a South Korean field hockey player. At the 2012 Summer Olympics she competed with the Korea women's national field hockey team in the women's tournament. She competed at the 2010 and 2010 Asian Games.

She won a gold medal as a member of the South Korean team at 2014 Asian Games.
