= Li Hong (field hockey) =

Chinese field hockey player

Personal information
- Born: 31 May 1999 (age 27) China

Sport
- Sport: Field hockey
- Position: Midfield
National team
Years	Team	Caps	Goals
2013–2016	China U–21	15	(1)
2016–	China	67	(6)
Medal record
Women's field hockey
Representing China
Olympic Games
Silver medal – second place	2024 Paris	Team
Asian Games
Gold medal – first place	2022 Hangzhou	Team
Bronze medal – third place	2018 Jakarta	Team
Asia Cup
Gold medal – first place	2025 Hangzhou
Asian Champions Trophy
Silver medal – second place	2016 Singapore
Bronze medal – third place	2018 Donghae
Bronze medal – third place	2021 Donghae
Youth Olympic Games
Gold medal – first place	2014 Nanjing	Team
Girls' Asia Cup
Gold medal – first place	2016 Bangkok

Li Hong (born 31 May 1999) is a field hockey player from China, who plays as a midfielder.

== Career ==
=== Under–18 ===
In 2014, Li was a member of the China U–18 team that won gold at the 2014 Youth Olympics in Nanjing.

=== Under–21 ===
Li was a member of the China U–21 from 2013 to 2016, representing the team for the first time at just 13 years of age. She appeared in two FIH Junior World Cups, in 2013 and 2016.

=== Senior national team ===
Following a successful junior career, Li debuted for the Chinese senior team in 2016.

Li was a member of the bronze medal winning team at the 2018 Asian Games.

In 2019, Li was a member of the Chinese team throughout the inaugural season of the FIH Pro League.

==== International goals ====
Goal	Date	Location	Opponent	Score	Result	Competition	Ref.
1	14 May 2018	Donghae City Sunrise Stadium, Donghae, South Korea	Malaysia	2–0	3–1	2018 Asian Champions Trophy	
2	27 August 2018	GBK Hockey Field, Jakarta, Indonesia	Hong Kong	15–0	15–0	2018 Asian Games	
3	20 November 2018	Wujin Hockey Stadium, Changzhou, China	Argentina	2–0	2–0	2018 FIH Champions Trophy	
4	19 January 2019	Panzhihua Park, Panzhihua, China	Canada	3–2	3–2	Test Match	
5	20 January 2019	Panzhihua Park, Panzhihua, China	Canada	2–1	5–3	Test Match	
6	20 January 2019	Panzhihua Park, Panzhihua, China	Canada	4–1	5–3	Test Match	
