= Anthony Farry =

Australian field hockey coach

Anthony Farry (born 13 July 1973) is an Australian field hockey coach who is currently the head coach of the China national field hockey team.

He coached the team at the 2018 Women's Hockey World Cup.

Previously Anthony was the head coach of the Canadian Men's field hockey team from 2012 to 2017. A highlight of which was guiding the team to Olympic qualification for the 2016 Rio Olympics.
