= Yukari Mano =

Japanese field hockey player

Personal information
- Born: 4 March 1994 (age 32) Kakamigahara, Japan
- Height: 1.52 m (5 ft 0 in)
- Weight: 51 kg (112 lb)

Sport
- Sport: Field hockey
National team
Years	Team	Caps	Goals
2013–	Japan	93	-
Medal record
Women's field hockey
Representing Japan
Asian Games
Gold medal – first place	2018 Jakarta	Team
Asia Cup
Gold medal – first place	2013 Kuala Lumpur
Asian Champions Trophy
Gold medal – first place	2013 Kakamigahara
Bronze medal – third place	2016 Singapore
Girls' Asia Cup
Gold medal – first place	2011 Bangkok

Yukari Mano (真野 由佳梨, Mano Yukari; born 4 March 1994) is a Japanese field hockey player. She competed for the Japan women's national field hockey team at the 2016 Summer Olympics.
