= Lilima Minz =

Indian field hockey player (born 1994)

Personal information
- Born: 10 April 1994 (age 32) Odisha, India
- Height: 1.58 m (5 ft 2 in)
- Weight: 52 kg (115 lb)

Sport
- Sport: Field hockey
- Position: Defender
- Club: Odisha, Railway
National team
Years	Team	Caps	Goals
2011–	India U18		-
2012–2013	India U21		-
2011–	India	155	(12)
Medal record
Women's field hockey
Representing India
Asian Games
Silver medal – second place	2018 Jakarta	Team
Bronze medal – third place	2014 Incheon	Team
Asia Cup
Gold medal – first place	2017 Gifu	Team
Asian Champions Trophy
Silver medal – second place	2018 Donghae
Junior World Cup
Bronze medal – third place	2013 Mönchengladbach
Junior Asia Cup
Silver medal – second place	2012 Bangkok
Girls' Asia Cup
Bronze medal – third place	2011 Bangkok

Lilima Minz (born 10 April 1994) is an Indian female field hockey player. Lilima hails from Bihabandh-Tanatoli village, Lanjiberna Block, Sundargarh District of Odisha. She is a product of Sports Hostel, Panposh, Rourkela, Odisha.

== Career ==
Lilima Minz, born on 10 April 1994, trained at the Sports Hostel, Panposh, Rourkela, Odisha. Lilima represented Indian senior team for the first time in 2011 during a four-nation tournament in Argentina. She was part of Indian junior team that won the bronze medal in 2013 Women's Hockey Junior World Cup for the first time in 2013. In March 2018, Minz completed her 100 appearances for the National team. Minz was also part of the squad that represented India in Rio Olympics after 36 years. She was also part of Asian cup winning squad in 2017. Lilima was one of the four players who were made to sit on the floor of the train for an hour due to unconfirmed railway ticket on their way back to home from Rio Olympics.

== Awards and achievements ==
Lilima has appeared for Indian National team in more than 100 matches.

- Received a special incentive of Rs 10 Lakh for participation in Rio Olympic Games by Odisha Mining Corporation.
- Was awarded Rs. 75,000 by Odisha government and Rs. 10,000 by Odisha Cricket Association in October 2014 for helping India win women's bronze medal in the 17th Asian Games at Incheon.
- Was felicitated by Mahanadi Coalfields Limited felicitated with a cash award of Rs 1 lakh for helping India win bronze medal in the 2013 Junior Women Hockey World Cup in Germany.

=== International ===
- Part of the Indian team that won the bronze medal at the Girls U-18 Asia Cup in Bangkok, Thailand (25 September 2011).
- Represented Indian senior team in the FIH World League (Round 2) at New Delhi from 18 to 24 February 2013.
- She was a part of the Indian team that won the bronze medal for the first time in 2013 Women's Hockey Junior World Cup at Monchengladbach in Germany on 4 July 2013.
- Member of the Indian team that won the women's hockey test series 6–0 against Malaysia held at Kualalumpur from 9 to 17 June 2014.
- She was part of the Indian women team in 20th Commonwealth Games, held in Glasgow from 23 July to 3 August 2014.
- She was a member of the Indian women hockey team that won the bronze medal in the 17th Asian Games at Incheon (South Korea) on 1 October 2014.
- Played her 50th match for the Indian women hockey team against the China in the 2015 Hawke's Bay Cup at Hastings in New Zealand on 11 April 2015.
- Completed her 100 appearances for India against South Korea in March 2018.
- Represented India in the Rio Olympics, Brazil, 2016.
- She was part of the 2017 Women's Hockey Asia Cup winning squad.
- Represented India in 2018 Commonwealth Games.
- Represented India in the 2018 Women's Hockey World Cup in London.

=== National ===
- Represented Panposh Hostel in the Junior Nehru Cup Hockey Tournament in 2006, 2007, 2008, 2009 (Champions) and 2010 (3rd position).
- Represented Orissa in the National Rural Games in 2007 and 2009 (Champion).
- Represented Orissa in the National School Games in 2006, 2008, 2009 (Champion) and 2011.
- Represented Orissa in the National Inter-School Games in 2008 (3rd position).
- Represented Orissa in the Sub-junior National Championship in 2007 (3rd position) and 2008 (3rd position).
- Represented Orissa in the Women's National Games in 2010 (Runners-up).
- Represented Orissa in the Senior National Championship in 2011 (3rd position).
- Represented Orissa in the National Games in 2011.
