= Yui Ishibashi =

Japanese field hockey player

Personal information
- Born: 1 April 1996 (age 30)
- Height: 1.48 m (4 ft 10 in)
- Weight: 41 kg (90 lb)

Sport
- Sport: Field hockey
National team
Years	Team	Caps	Goals
2016–	Japan	25	-
Medal record
Women's field hockey
Representing Japan
Asian Games
Gold medal – first place	2018 Jakarta	Team competition

Yui Ishibashi (石橋 唯今, Ishibashi Yui; born 1 April 1996) is a Japanese field hockey player for the Japanese national team.

She participated at the 2018 Women's Hockey World Cup.
