= Megumi Kageyama =

Japanese field hockey player

Personal information
- Born: 5 November 1992 (age 33)
- Height: 1.72 m (5 ft 8 in)
- Weight: 65 kg (143 lb)

Sport
- Sport: Field hockey
- Position: Goalkeeper
National team
Years	Team	Caps	Goals
2017–	Japan	50	(0)
Medal record
Women's field hockey
Representing Japan
Asian Games
Gold medal – first place	2018 Jakarta	Team
Asian Champions Trophy
Bronze medal – third place	2016 Singapore

Megumi Kageyama (景山 恵, Kageyama Megumi; born 5 November 1992) is a Japanese field hockey player for the Japanese national team.

She participated at the 2018 Women's Hockey World Cup.
