= Lee Yu-rim (field hockey) =

South Korean field hockey player

Personal information
- Born: 14 December 1994 (age 31)
- Height: 1.62 m (5 ft 4 in)
- Weight: 59 kg (130 lb)

Sport
- Sport: Field hockey
National team
Years	Team	Caps	Goals
2017–	South Korea	31	-
Medal record
Women's field hockey
Representing South Korea
Asian Champions Trophy
Gold medal – first place	2018 Donghae

Lee Yu-rim (born 14 December 1994) is a South Korean field hockey player for the South Korean national team.

She participated at the 2018 Women's Hockey World Cup.
