= Navneet Kaur (field hockey) =

Indian field hockey player

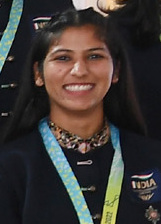
- Kaur in August 2022

Personal information
- Born: 26 January 1996 (age 30) Shahabad Markanda, Haryana, India
- Height: 1.63 m (5 ft 4 in)
- Weight: 59 kg (130 lb)

Sport
- Sport: Field hockey
- Position: Forward
Senior career
Years	Team	Caps	Goals
–	Railways	-	-
2025–	Delhi SG Pipers	-	-
National team
Years	Team	Caps	Goals
2012–2013	India U21		-
2014–	India	224	(84)
Medal record
Women's field hockey
Representing India
Asian Games
Gold medal – first place	2026 Aichi–Nagoya	Team
Silver medal – second place	2018 Jakarta	Team
Bronze medal – third place	2022 Hangzhou	Team
Commonwealth Games
Bronze medal – third place	2022 Birmingham	Team
Asia Cup
Gold medal – first place	2017 Gifu
Silver medal – second place	2025 Hangzhou
Bronze medal – third place	2022 Muscat
Asian Champions Trophy
Gold medal – first place	2016 Singapore
Gold medal – first place	2023 Ranchi
Gold medal – first place	2024 Rajgir
Silver medal – second place	2018 Donghae
FIH Nations Cup
Gold medal – first place	2022 Spain
Junior World Cup
Bronze medal – third place	2013 Mönchengladbach
Junior Asia Cup
Silver medal – second place	2012 Bangkok

Navneet Kaur (born 26 January 1996 at Shahabad Markanda) is an Indian field hockey player, who plays as a forward for the Indian national team.

== Career ==
Navneet was part of the Indian team that won a silver at the 2018 Asian Games.

On 8 April 2022, she made her 100th international appearance in the 2021-22 Women's FIH Pro League match against the Netherlands team. She also won the Player of the Match award for her performance against the Dutch team.

She is presently employed with Western Railway of the Indian Railways. She was the leading goal scorer for India at the 2026 World Cup with 4 goals.
