= Cui Qiuxia =

Chinese field hockey player (born 1990)

Personal information
- Born: 11 September 1990 (age 35)
- Height: 1.66 m (5 ft 5 in)
- Weight: 64 kg (141 lb)

Sport
- Sport: Field hockey
National team
Years	Team	Caps	Goals
2011–	China	142	-
Medal record
Women's field hockey
Representing China
Asian Games
Silver medal – second place	2014 Incheon	Team
Bronze medal – third place	2018 Jakarta	Team
Asia Cup
Silver medal – second place	2017 Gifu	Team
Asian Champions Trophy
Silver medal – second place	2011 Ordos
Bronze medal – third place	2018 Donghae

Cui Qiuxia (Chinese: 崔秋霞; 11 September 1990) is a Chinese field hockey player. At the 2012 Summer Olympics and 2016 Summer Olympics she competed with the China women's national field hockey team in the women's tournament.

She won a silver medal as a member of the Chinese team at 2014 Asian Games.
