= Sjoerd Marijne =

Dutch field hockey player

Personal information
- Born: 20 April 1974 (age 52) 's-Hertogenbosch, Netherlands

Sport
- Sport: Field hockey
- Club: India Women (Head coach)
Senior career
Years	Team	Caps	Goals
–	Den Bosch	-	-
Coaching career
- 2001–2003: MOP
- 2003–2007: Tilburg
- 2007–2010: Amsterdam
- 2010–2012: Oranje Zwart
- 2012–2013: Den Bosch
- 2013–2014: Netherlands U21
- 2014–2015: Netherlands Women
- 2017: India Women
- 2017–2018: India
- 2018–2021: India Women
- 2026–: India Women
- Updated on 6 August 2021

Sjoerd Marijne (born 20 April 1974) is a Dutch former field hockey player and currently the head coach of the Indian women's national team.

He played for ten years as part of Den Bosch in the Hoofdklasse.

== As coach of Indian women's team ==
He coached the Indian team at the 2018 Women's Hockey World Cup, where India lost in the quarterfinals to Ireland.

=== Tokyo Olympics 2020 ===
At the beginning of the Tokyo Olympics, India was ranked number 8 in the world and was not considered a serious contender. India had a historic showing under his coaching, reaching the semifinals for the first time. They had a disastrous start to the tournament, losing in succession to the Netherlands (1 - 5), Germany (0 - 2) and Great Britain (1 - 4) in the group stage. However, India beat Ireland 1 - 0 and South Africa 4 - 3 to qualify for the quarterfinals. There, they stunned then World no. 3 Australia 1 - 0, to advance to the semifinal stage for the first time in history. However, India lost to World no. 2 Argentina 1 - 2 in the semifinal and had to settle to competing for bronze. India lost the bronze medal match narrowly to Great Britain 3 - 4, and finished fourth. Marijne is widely credited for the Indian team's turnaround after decades of dismal showings.

On 6 August 2021, after India's loss to Great Britain, Marijne announced that he would retire as the head coach of the India women's team to spend more time with his family.
