= Motomi Kawamura =

Japanese field hockey player

Personal information
- Born: 5 March 1996 (age 30) Kishiwada, Japan
- Height: 1.57 m (5 ft 2 in)
- Weight: 54 kg (119 lb)

Sport
- Sport: Field hockey
National team
Years	Team	Caps	Goals
2014–	Japan	65	-
Medal record
Women's field hockey
Representing Japan
Asian Games
Gold medal – first place	2018 Jakarta	Team competition

Motomi Kawamura (河村 元美, Kawamura Motomi; born 5 March 1996) is a Japanese field hockey player. She competed for the Japan women's national field hockey team at the 2016 Summer Olympics.
