= Gurjit Kaur =

Indian field hockey player

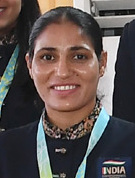
- Kaur in August 2022

Personal information
- Born: 25 October 1995 (age 30) Miadi Kalan, Amritsar, Punjab, India
- Height: 1.67 m (5 ft 6 in)
- Weight: 59 kg (130 lb)

Sport
- Sport: Field hockey
- Position: Defender
- Club: Railways
Senior career
Years	Team	Caps	Goals
–	Railways	-	-
National team
Years	Team	Caps	Goals
2014–	India	137	(86)
Medal record
Women's field hockey
Representing India
Asian Games
Silver medal – second place	2018 Jakarta	Team
Commonwealth Games
Bronze medal – third place	2022 Birmingham	Team
Asia Cup
Gold medal – first place	2017 Gifu
Bronze medal – third place	2022 Muscat
Asian Champions Trophy
Silver medal – second place	2018 Donghae
FIH Nations Cup
Gold medal – first place	2022 Spain
South Asian Games
Gold medal – first place	2016 Guwahati	Team

Gurjit Kaur (born 25 October 1995) is an Indian female field hockey player. She plays the position of a defender and is also the team's designated drag flicker. She has represented India internationally, most recently at the Hockey World Cup 2018. She was the most successful goal-scorer during India's Asia Cup title triumph with 8 goals. She has played 53 international matches, as of July 2018. She was named women's "Player of the Year" at FIH Player of the Year Awards for the year 2020–21. She is regarded as a great Indian player who represented punjab and India at the national level.

== Early life ==
Gurjit Kaur was born on 25 October 1995, in the Miadi Kalan village in Amritsar, Punjab. She was born into a farming family to parents Satnam Singh and Harjinder Kaur. She has one older sister, Pradeep Kaur. It was important to her parents to give her and her sister a quality education, so they elected to send their two daughters to a private school in Ajnala, over 13 km away, instead of the local government school in the village. Gurjit's father Satnam Singh would fit his daughters into his cycle and drive them to school, and wait all day until their school got over to ferry them back.

Since this was not a practical solution, her parents finally decided to send their two daughters to a boarding school over 70 km away in Kairon in the Tarn Taran district of Punjab in 2006. Kairon happened to be one of the oldest and most famous women's hockey nurseries, and this is where the two sisters discovered their passion for the sport. Their excellence in hockey earned them a spot in the government wing of the school, granting them free education and meals, which came as a relief to the sisters' cash-strapped parents.

Gurjit Kaur continued her education at Kairon until 2011, after which she moved to Jalandhar's Lyallpur Khalsa College for Women to continue her education and her training – which is where she got serious about drag-flicking. After this, she got placed in the Indian Railways as a junior clerk in Allahabad.

== Career ==
Gurjit Kaur got her first shot at playing for the country when she was called for the Senior National Camp in 2014. However, she could not secure a place on the team. It was only in 2017 that she became a permanent member of the Indian women's hockey team. Gurjit Kaur then played in the Test series in Canada in March 2017, the Hockey World League Round 2 in April 2017 and the Hockey World League semifinals in July 2017.

The Dutch head coach of India, Sjoerd Marijne, encouraged her to change her stick to get better at drag flicking, which improved her game. "The stick I used earlier felt light and I didn’t get enough power. So, when we went to Holland, Marijne asked me to try drag-flicking with a different stick. It was much better and I felt more powerful. The change has helped me,” Gurjit said in an interview to The Tribune. Marijne also arranged for her to train with Dutch coach Toon Siepman, who helped her work on her basics like her posture and footwork during the drag-flicking process.

Gurjit Kaur's time in the spotlight came in the 2017 Asia Cup, in which the Indian team emerged as continental champions and consequently qualified for a spot at the Hockey World Cup in London in 2018. Gurjit Kaur ended the tournament as the third-highest goal scorer by netting eight goals, and was also the Indian team's top scorer. She converted seven penalty corners including a hat-trick against Kazakhstan in the quarter-final. In the semi-final she scored twice against defending champions Japan.

Gurjit Kaur also made an impressive performance at the Commonwealth Games 2018, held in Australia. Although India did not secure a podium finish, coming in at fourth place, Gurjit Kaur caught attention for her two penalty corner conversion goals against Malaysia in its second pool A match during the tournament, helping India score a 4–1 win.

In the lead-up to the Hockey World Cup 2018, the Indian team played a series of five matches against the Spanish national team dubbed the Spain Tour, which they won 4–1. In the final match, Gurjit Kaur scored two goals alongside skipper Rani Rampal who also scored two goals, bringing the final score to 4–1.

Gurjit Kaur is also a part of the Hockey World Cup squad as India's defender and drag flicker.

Gurjit Kaur also made another impressive performance by scoring the only goal against Australia in 2020 Summer Olympics. This helped India reach semi-finals in Olympic women's hockey for first time ever.
