= Kimika Hoshi =

Japanese field hockey player

Personal information
- Born: 26 January 1996 (age 30)

Sport
- Sport: Field hockey
- Position: Defender
- Club: Club Raffelberg
National team
Years	Team	Caps	Goals
–	Japan		-
Medal record
Asia Cup
Gold medal – first place	2022 Muscat
Asian Champions Trophy
Gold medal – first place	2021 Donghae

Kimika Hoshi (星 希巳加, Hoshi Kimika, is a Japanese field hockey player for the Japanese national team, who participated in the 2020 Summer Olympics.
