= Mami Karino =

Japanese field hockey player

Personal information
- Born: 10 January 1996 (age 30)
- Height: 1.68 m (5 ft 6 in)
- Weight: 62 kg (137 lb)

Sport
- Sport: Field hockey
National team
| Years | Team | Caps | Goals |
| 2014– | Japan | 41 | - |
Medal record
Women's field hockey
Representing Japan
Asian Games
| Gold medal – first place | 2018 Jakarta | Team competition |

Mami Karino (狩野 真美, Karino Mami; born 10 January 1996) is a Japanese field hockey player for the Japanese national team.

She participated at the 2018 Women's Hockey World Cup.
