= Gu Bingfeng =

Chinese field hockey player (born 1994)

Personal information
- Born: 25 January 1994 (age 32)
- Height: 1.73 m (5 ft 8 in)
- Weight: 70 kg (154 lb)

Sport
- Sport: Field hockey
National team
Years	Team	Caps	Goals
2014–	China	56	-
Medal record
Women's field hockey
Representing China
Olympic Games
Silver medal – second place	2024 Paris	Team
Asian Games
Gold medal – first place	2022 Hangzhou	Team
Bronze medal – third place	2018 Jakarta	Team
Asian Champions Trophy
Bronze medal – third place	2018 Donghae

Gu Bingfeng (born 25 January 1994) is a Chinese field hockey player for the Chinese national team.

She participated at the 2018 Women's Hockey World Cup.
