= Hazuki Nagai =

Japanese field hockey player

Personal information
- Born: 15 August 1994 (age 32) Kakamigahara, Japan
- Height: 1.52 m (5 ft 0 in)
- Weight: 54 kg (119 lb)

Sport
- Sport: Field hockey
National team
Years	Team	Caps	Goals
2013–	Japan	142	-
Medal record
Women's field hockey
Representing Japan
Asian Games
Gold medal – first place	2018 Jakarta	Team
Asian Champions Trophy
Gold medal – first place	2013 Kakamigahara
Gold medal – first place	2021 Donghae
Bronze medal – third place	2016 Singapore
Girls' Asia Cup
Gold medal – first place	2011 Bangkok

Hazuki Nagai (永井 葉月, Nagai Hazuki; born 15 August 1994) is a Japanese field hockey player. She competed for the Japan women's national field hockey team at the 2016 Summer Olympics.
