= 2018 Women's Asian Champions Trophy =

Field hockey competition

Tournament details
- Host country: South Korea
- City: Donghae
- Dates: 13–20 May
- Teams: 5 (from 1 confederation)
- Venue: Donghae City Sunrise Stadium

Final positions
- Champions: South Korea (3rd title)
- Runner-up: India
- Third place: China

Tournament statistics
- Matches played: 12
- Goals scored: 40 (3.33 per match)
- Top scorer(s): (India) Vandana Katariya (India) Navneet Kaur (China) Song Xiaoming (3 goals)

The 2018 Women's Asian Champions Trophy was the fifth edition of the Women's Asian Champions Trophy, a field hockey tournament for the five best Asian women's national field hockey teams organized by the Asian Hockey Federation.

The tournament was held in Donghae, South Korea. The top five Asian teams (China, India, Japan, South Korea and Malaysia) participated in the tournament which involved a round-robin tournament among all teams followed by play-offs for the final positions.

== Qualified teams ==
The following teams have qualified:

- China
- India
- Japan
- South Korea
- Malaysia

== Results ==
All times are (UTC+09:00)

=== Round-robin ===
Pos	Team	Pld	W	D	L	GF	GA	GD	Pts	Qualification
1	India	4	3	1	0	11	5	+6	10	Final
2	South Korea (H)	4	2	2	0	8	4	+4	8	Final
3	China	4	2	0	2	7	7	0	6	Third place game
4	Malaysia	4	1	0	3	7	11	−4	3	Third place game
5	Japan	4	0	1	3	4	10	−6	1	

Source: FIH
Rules for classification: 1) points; 2) goal difference; 3) goals scored; 4) head-to-head result.
(H) Hosts

13 May 2018
14:30

India	4–1	Japan
N. Kaur 7', 53', 55'; Barla 53'	Report	Yamada 58'

Umpires:
Miao Lin (CHN)
Ayu Zainuddin (MAS)

13 May 2018
16:30

South Korea	3–1	Malaysia
Lee Yu-ri 34'; Kim H. 43'; Kim B. 55'	Report	Mansur 32'

Umpires:
Liu Xiaoying (CHN)
Dahiya Deepa (IND)

14 May 2018
14:30

South Korea	1–1	Japan
Kim O. 21'	Report	Ichitani 37'

Umpires:
Melissa Trivic (AUS)
Liu Xiaoying (CHN)

14 May 2018
16:30

China	3–1	Malaysia
Zhang J. 3'; Li H. 20'; Cui 52'	Report	Onn 22'

Umpires:
Emi Yamada (JPN)
Kim Yoon-seon (KOR)

16 May 2018
14:30

Japan	2–3	Malaysia
Ishibashi 9'; Shimizu 34'	Report	Z. Aziz 1'; Sukri 19'; Said 30'

Umpires:
Miao Lin (CHN)
Dahiya Deepa (IND)

16 May 2018
16:30

India	3–1	China
Katariya 4', 11'; G. Kaur 51'	Report	Dan 15'

Umpires:
Melissa Trivic (AUS)
Emi Yamada (JPN)

17 May 2018
14:30

Malaysia	2–3	India
Rashid 36'; Onn 48'	Report	G. Kaur 17'; Katariya 33'; Lalremsiami 40'

Umpires:
Liu Xiaoying (CHN)
Kim Yoon-seon (KOR)

17 May 2018
16:30

South Korea	3–1	China
Kim Ok-ju 11'; Lee Yu-rim 27', 39'	Report	Gu 27'

Umpires:
Melissa Trivic (AUS)
Ayu Zainuddin (MAS)

19 May 2018
13:00

China	2–0	Japan
Song 6'; Zhang J. 32'	Report

Umpires:
Melissa Trivic (AUS)
Kim Yoon-seon (KOR)

19 May 2018
15:00

India	1–1	South Korea
Lalremsiami 49'	Report	Cheon Seul-ki 20'

Umpires:
Liu Xiaoying (CHN)
Emi Yamada (JPN)

=== Classification round ===
==== Third place game ====
20 May 2018
12:45

China	2–0	Malaysia
Song 14', 53'	Report

Umpires:
Melissa Trivic (AUS)
Emi Yamada (JPN)

==== Final ====
20 May 2018
15:00

India	0–1	South Korea
	Report	Lee Y. 24'

Umpires:
Miao Lin (CHN)
Liu Xiaoying (CHN)

== Final standings ==
1. South Korea
2. India
3. China
4. Malaysia
5. Japan

== See also ==
- 2018 Men's Asian Champions Trophy
- Field hockey at the 2018 Asian Games – Women's tournament
