= Minami Shimizu =

Japanese field hockey player

Personal information
- Born: 14 July 1993 (age 33)
- Height: 1.58 m (5 ft 2 in)
- Weight: 52 kg (115 lb)

Sport
- Sport: Field hockey
- Position: Forward
- Club: HC BRAVIA Ladies
National team
Years	Team	Caps	Goals
2013–	Japan	76	-
Medal record
Women's field hockey
Representing Japan
Asian Games
Gold medal – first place	2018 Jakarta	Team
Asian Champions Trophy
Bronze medal – third place	2016 Singapore
Universiade
Bronze medal – third place	2013 Kazan	Team
Girls' Asia Cup
Gold medal – first place	2011 Bangkok

Minami Shimizu (清水 美並, Shimizu Minami; born 14 July 1993) is a Japanese field hockey player. She competed for the Japan women's national field hockey team at the 2016 Summer Olympics.
