= Field hockey at the 2018 Asian Games – Women's tournament =

Women's field hockey tournament at the 2018 Asian Games
Tournament details
- Host country: Indonesia
- City: Jakarta
- Dates: 19–31 August
- Teams: 10
- Venue: Gelora Bung Karno Hockey Field

Medalists
| gold medal | Japan |
| silver medal | India |
| bronze medal | China |

Tournament statistics
- Matches played: 27
- Goals scored: 158 (5.85 per match)
- Top scorer: (China) Gu Bingfeng (13 goals)

Women's tournament for field hockey at the 2018 Asian Games was held at the Gelora Bung Karno Hockey Field, Jakarta, Indonesia from 19 to 31 August 2018. It was held alongside the men's tournament at the same venue from 20 August to 1 September 2018.

== Competition schedule ==
| P | Preliminary round | ½ | Semi-finals | B | Bronze medal match | F | Gold medal match |

| Sun 19 | Mon 20 | Tue 21 | Wed 22 | Thu 23 | Fri 24 | Sat 25 | Sun 26 | Mon 27 | Tue 28 | Wed 29 | Thu 30 | Fri 31 | |
|---|---|---|---|---|---|---|---|---|---|---|---|---|---|
| P | | P | | P | | P | | P | | ½ | | B | F |

== Qualification ==
| Means of qualification | Dates | Venue | Berths | Qualified |
|---|---|---|---|---|
| Host country | 19 September 2014 | (Indonesia) Jakarta | 1 | Indonesia |
| 2014 Asian Games | 20 September – 2 October 2014 | (South Korea) Incheon | 5 | South Korea |
| 2014 Asian Games | 20 September – 2 October 2014 | (South Korea) Incheon | 5 | China |
| 2014 Asian Games | 20 September – 2 October 2014 | (South Korea) Incheon | 5 | India |
| 2014 Asian Games | 20 September – 2 October 2014 | (South Korea) Incheon | 5 | Japan |
| 2014 Asian Games | 20 September – 2 October 2014 | (South Korea) Incheon | 5 | Malaysia |
| Asian Games Qualifiers | 12–20 January 2018 | (Thailand) Bangkok | 4 | Thailand |
| Asian Games Qualifiers | 12–20 January 2018 | (Thailand) Bangkok | 4 | Hong Kong |
| Asian Games Qualifiers | 12–20 January 2018 | (Thailand) Bangkok | 4 | Chinese Taipei |
| Asian Games Qualifiers | 12–20 January 2018 | (Thailand) Bangkok | 4 | Kazakhstan |
| Total | | | 10 | |

== Pools composition ==
Teams were seeded following the serpentine system according to their FIH World Ranking as of December 2017.

| Pool A | Pool B |
|---|---|
| China (8) | South Korea (9) |
| Japan (12) | India (10) |
| Malaysia (22) | Thailand (28) |
| Hong Kong (43) | Kazakhstan (34) |
| Chinese Taipei (53) | Indonesia (65) |

== Preliminary round ==
All times are local (UTC+7).

=== Pool A ===
| Pos | Team | Pld | W | D | L | PF | PA | PD | Pts | Qualification |
|---|---|---|---|---|---|---|---|---|---|---|
| 1 | Japan | 4 | 4 | 0 | 0 | 24 | 3 | +21 | 12 | Semifinals |
| 2 | China | 4 | 2 | 1 | 1 | 28 | 6 | +22 | 7 | Semifinals |
| 3 | Malaysia | 4 | 2 | 1 | 1 | 22 | 5 | +17 | 7 | 5th place game |
| 4 | Chinese Taipei | 4 | 1 | 0 | 3 | 3 | 33 | −30 | 3 | 7th place game |
| 5 | Hong Kong | 4 | 0 | 0 | 4 | 2 | 32 | −30 | 0 | 9th place game |

Source: FIH
Rules for classification: 1) points; 2) goal difference; 3) goals scored; 4) head-to-head result.

19 August 2018
16:00

| Japan | 11–0 | Chinese Taipei |
|---|---|---|
| H Nagai 3', 6', 20', 43', 54'; Kawamura 9', 13', 21', 52'; Nishikori 32'; Karino 59' | Report |

Umpires:
Suzi Sutton (USA)
Binish Hayat (PAK)

19 August 2018
18:00

| Malaysia | 8–0 | Hong Kong |
|---|---|---|
| Abdul Rashid 3', 45', 58'; Zulkifli 16', 34'; Onn 32'; Sylvester 50'; Sumantri 59' | Report |

Umpires:
Cookie Tan (SGP)
Kim Yoon-seon (KOR)

21 August 2018
14:00

| Japan | 6–0 | Hong Kong |
|---|---|---|
| Yamada 11', 42'; Ono 26'; Aikawa 33'; Nishikori 37', 59' | Report |

Umpires:
Ayanna McClean (TTO)
Ornpimol Kittiteerasopon (THA)

21 August 2018
16:00

| China | 9–0 | Chinese Taipei |
|---|---|---|
| Xi 9', 27'; Gu 30', 45'; Zhang X 36', 56'; Peng 50', 55'; Liang 54' | Report |

Umpires:
Junko Wagatsuma (JPN)
Dahiya Deepa (IND)

23 August 2018
16:00

| Hong Kong | 2–3 | Chinese Taipei |
|---|---|---|
| O. Chiu 22'; Lau 34' | Report | Yang Chi. 15'; Liao 40'; Yang Chu. 42' |

Umpires:
Suzi Sutton (USA)
Binish Hayat (PAK)

23 August 2018
18:00

| Malaysia | 2–2 | China |
|---|---|---|
| Onn 33', 44' | Report | Liang 10'; Gu 49' |

Umpires:
Kelly Hudson (NZL)
Kim Yoon-seon (KOR)

25 August 2018
14:00

| Chinese Taipei | 0–11 | Malaysia |
|---|---|---|
| | Report | Abdul Rashid 4', 26', 40', 44', 56'; Mohd Ali 10'; Aziz 21', 52'; Sumantri 26'; Zulkifli 32'; Onn 51' |

Umpires:
Cookie Tan (SGP)
Ornpimol Kittiteerasopon (THA)

25 August 2018
18:00

| Japan | 4–2 | China |
|---|---|---|
| Shimizu 4', 8'; Oikawa 19'; Kato 26' | Report | Gu 12', 32' |

Umpires:
Kelly Hudson (NZL)
Kim Yoon-seon (KOR)

27 August 2018
18:00

| China | 15–0 | Hong Kong |
|---|---|---|
| Peng 15'; Ou 20', 41'; Xi 22', 29', 44'; Gu 30', 34', 35', 36', 37', 40', 46'; Liang 44'; Li 60' | Report |

Umpires:
Binish Hayat (PAK)
Dahiya Seepa (IND)

27 August 2018
20:00

| Malaysia | 1–3 | Japan |
|---|---|---|
| Zulkifli 47' | Report | Karino 21'; Nagai 38', 50' |

Umpires:
Suzi Sutton (USA)
Ayanna McClean (TTO)

=== Pool B ===
| Pos | Team | Pld | W | D | L | PF | PA | PD | Pts | Qualification |
|---|---|---|---|---|---|---|---|---|---|---|
| 1 | India | 4 | 4 | 0 | 0 | 38 | 1 | +37 | 12 | Semifinals |
| 2 | South Korea | 4 | 3 | 0 | 1 | 17 | 4 | +13 | 9 | Semifinals |
| 3 | Thailand | 4 | 1 | 0 | 3 | 3 | 11 | −8 | 3 | 5th place game |
| 4 | Indonesia (H) | 4 | 1 | 0 | 3 | 2 | 16 | −14 | 3 | 7th place game |
| 5 | Kazakhstan | 4 | 1 | 0 | 3 | 4 | 32 | −28 | 3 | 9th place game |

Source: FIH
Rules for classification: 1) points; 2) goal difference; 3) goals scored; 4) head-to-head result.
(H) Hosts

19 August 2018
14:00

| Thailand | 1–3 | Kazakhstan |
|---|---|---|
| Aunjai 58' | Report | Domashneva 21'; Gataulina 33'; Sazontova 50' |

Umpires:
Kelly Hudson (NZL)
Ayanna McClean (TTO)

19 August 2018
20:00

| India | 8–0 | Indonesia |
|---|---|---|
| Udita 9'; Katariya 14', 28'; Gurjit 17', 22', 57'; Lalremsiami 25'; Navneet 50' | Report |

Umpires:
Chieko Soma (JPN)
Chen Mei-chen (TPE)

21 August 2018
18:00

| South Korea | 5–0 | Indonesia |
|---|---|---|
| Kim B. 8'; Cho E. 17'; Cheon 22'; Lee Yu-rim 53'; Lee Yo. 57' | Report |

Umpires:
Nur Hafizah Azman (MAS)
Chen Jianjun (CHN)

21 August 2018
20:00

| India | 21–0 | Kazakhstan |
|---|---|---|
| Gurjit 7', 36', 44', 52'; Lalremsiami 9', 19', 30'; Goyal 10'; Navneet 11', 12', 49'; Navjot 16', 54'; Katariya 29', 37', 53'; Udita 34'; Minz 38', 45'; Ekka 43'; Malik 55' | Report |

Umpires:
Liu Xiaoying (CHN)
Cookie Tan (SGP)

23 August 2018
14:00

| Kazakhstan | 1–2 | Indonesia |
|---|---|---|
| Sazontova 6' | Report | Suwito 59'; El Islany 60' |

Umpires:
Chieko Soma (JPN)
Chen Jianjun (CHN)

23 August 2018
20:00

| Thailand | 0–3 | South Korea |
|---|---|---|
| | Report | Park M 6'; Kim O 52'; Park S 54' |

Umpires:
Liu Xiaoying (CHN)
Nur Hafizah Azman (MAS)

25 August 2018
16:00

| Indonesia | 0–2 | Thailand |
|---|---|---|
| | Report | Sakunpithak 26', 41' |

Umpires:
Nur Hafizah Azman (MAS)
Junko Wagatsuma (JPN)

25 August 2018
20:00

| India | 4–1 | South Korea |
|---|---|---|
| N. Kaur 16'; G. Kaur 54', 55'; Katariya 56' | Report | Lee Y. 21' |

Umpires:
Liu Xiaoying (CHN)
Ayanna McClean (TTO)

27 August 2018
14:00

| Thailand | 0–5 | India |
|---|---|---|
| | Report | Rampal 37', 46', 56'; Malik 52'; N. Kaur 55' |

Umpires:
Junko Wagatsuma (JPN)
Chen Mei-chen (TPE)

27 August 2018
16:00

| South Korea | 8–0 | Kazakhstan |
|---|---|---|
| Park S 9', 10', 30'; Cho 33'; Lee Yo. 36'; Cheon 40', 47'; Kim O 58' | Report |

Umpires:
Chieko Soma (JPN)
Chen Jianjun (CHN)

== Final round ==
=== Classification round ===
==== Ninth place game ====
31 August 2018
15:00

| Hong Kong | 2–0 | Kazakhstan |
|---|---|---|
| Lo 21'; Chan YM 52' | Report |

Umpires:
Junko Wagatsuma (JPN)
Binish Hayat (PAK)

==== Seventh place game ====
29 August 2018
12:30

| Chinese Taipei | 0–2 | Indonesia |
|---|---|---|
| | Report | Arindah 21'; Suwito 41' |

Umpires:
Nur Hafizah Azman (MAS)
Ornpimol Kittiteerasopon (THA)

==== Fifth place game ====
29 August 2018
15:00

| Malaysia | 2–0 | Thailand |
|---|---|---|
| Rashid 22'; Onn 54' | Report |

Umpires:
Cookie Tan (SGP)
Chen Mei-chen (TPE)

=== Medal round ===
Semi-finals
29 August
Japan | 2
South Korea | 0
29 August
India | 1
China | 0

Gold medal match
31 August
Japan | 2
India | 1
Bronze medal match
31 August
South Korea | 1
China | 2

==== Semifinals ====
29 August 2018
17:30

| Japan | 2–0 | South Korea |
|---|---|---|
| Ota 49'; Shimizu 60' | Report |

Umpires:
Kelly Hudson (NZL)
Chen Jianjun (CHN)

29 August 2018
20:00

| India | 1–0 | China |
|---|---|---|
| G. Kaur 52' | Report |

Umpires:
Chieko Soma (JPN)
Kim Yoon-seon (KOR)

==== Bronze medal game ====
31 August 2018
17:30

| South Korea | 1–2 | China |
|---|---|---|
| Kim O-j 60' | Report | Gu 20'; Song 58' |

Umpires:
Ayanna McClean (TTO)
Suzi Sutton (USA)

==== Gold medal game ====
31 August 2018
20:00

| Japan | 2–1 | India |
|---|---|---|
| Shimizu 11'; Kawamura 44' | Report | Goyal 25' |

Umpires:
Kelly Hudson (NZL)
Liu Xiaoying (CHN)

== Final ranking ==
Qualification for 2020 Summer Olympics

| Rank | Team |
|---|---|
| Gold medal | Japan^{5} |
| Silver medal | India |
| Bronze medal | China |
| 4 | South Korea |
| 5 | Malaysia |
| 6 | Thailand |
| 7 | Indonesia |
| 8 | Chinese Taipei |
| 9 | Hong Kong |
| 10 | Kazakhstan |

^5 – Japan qualified both as host and continental champion, therefore that quota is added to the qualification events rather than going to the runner-up of the tournament.

== Statistics ==
=== Goalscorers ===
There were 158 goals scored in 27 matches, for an average of 5.85 goals per match.

13 goals

- (China) Gu Bingfeng

10 goals

- (India) Gurjit Kaur

9 goals

- (Malaysia) Nuraini Abdul Rashid

7 goals

- (Japan) Hazuki Nagai

6 goals

- (India) Vandana Katariya

5 goals

- (China) Xi Xiayun
- (India) Navneet Kaur
- (Japan) Motomi Kawamura
- (Malaysia) Hanis Nadiah Onn

4 goals

- (India) Lalremsiami
- (Japan) Minami Shimizu
- (Malaysia) Nuramirah Zulkifli
- (South Korea) Park Seung-a

3 goals

- (China) Liang Meiyu
- (China) Peng Yang
- (India) Navjot Kaur
- (India) Rani Rampal
- (Japan) Emi Nishikori
- (South Korea) Cheon Seul-ki
- (South Korea) Kim Ok-ju

2 goals

- (China) Ou Zixia
- (China) Zhang Xiaoxue
- (India) Lilima Minz
- (India) Monika Malik
- (India) Neha Goyal
- (India) Udita
- (Indonesia) Yuanita Rahmadhani Suwito
- (Japan) Aki Yamada
- (Japan) Mami Karino
- (Japan) Shihori Aikawa
- (Kazakhstan) Natalya Sazontova
- (Malaysia) Norazlin Sumantri
- (Malaysia) Nur Zafirah Aziz
- (South Korea) Lee Young-sil
- (South Korea) Lee Yu-rim
- (Thailand) Tikhamporn Sakunpithak

1 goal

- (China) Li Hong
- (China) Song Xiaoming
- (Chinese Taipei) Liao Pei-shan
- (Chinese Taipei) Yang Chia-yu
- (Chinese Taipei) Yang Chun-hui
- (Hong Kong) Chan Yi Man
- (Hong Kong) Lau Pui Sze
- (Hong Kong) Lo I Ka
- (Hong Kong) Olivia Chiu
- (India) Deep Grace Ekka
- (Indonesia) Annur Amalia El Islamy
- (Indonesia) Aulia Ghassani Putri Arindah
- (Japan) Akiko Kato
- (Japan) Akiko Ota
- (Japan) Mayumi Ono
- (Kazakhstan) Natalya Gataulina
- (Kazakhstan) Vera Domashneva
- (Malaysia) Fazilla Sylvester Silin
- (Malaysia) Noor Hasliza Md Ali
- (South Korea) Cho Eun-ji
- (South Korea) Cho Yun-kyoung
- (South Korea) Kim Bo-mi
- (South Korea) Park Mi-hyun
- (Thailand) Nanthakarn Aunjai

== See also ==
- Field hockey at the 2018 Asian Games – Men's tournament
