= 2022 Women's FIH Hockey World Cup squads =

This article lists the confirmed squads for the 2022 Women's Hockey World Cup tournament held in Terrassa, Spain and Amstelveen, the Netherlands from 1 to 17 July 2022.

Age, club, caps and goals as of 1 July 2022.

== Pool A ==
=== Chile ===
The squad was announced on 13 June 2022.

Head coach: (Argentina) Sergio Vigil

| No. | Pos. | Player | Date of birth (age) | Caps | Club |
|---|---|---|---|---|---|
| 1 | GK | Claudia Schüler | 28 November 1987 (aged 34) | 230 | (Chile) Club Manquehue |
| 2 | DF | Doménica Ananías | 18 August 1998 (aged 23) | 35 | (Chile) Club Manquehue |
| 3 | DF | Fernanda Villagrán | 12 August 1997 (aged 24) | 76 | (Chile) Club Manquehue |
| 5 | MF | Denise Rojas | 4 July 1995 (aged 26) | 168 | (Chile) Universidad Católica |
| 6 | DF | Fernanda Flores | 14 September 1993 (aged 28) | 175 | (Chile) Universidad Católica |
| 7 | MF | Sofía Filipek | 9 August 1994 (aged 27) | 146 | (Chile) COBS & COGS |
| 9 | FW | Kim Jacob | 5 August 1996 (aged 25) | 70 | (Chile) Universidad Católica |
| 10 | FW | Manuela Urroz | 24 September 1991 (aged 30) | 207 | (Belgium) Royal Antwerp |
| 11 | MF | Josefa Salas | 9 October 1995 (aged 26) | 74 | (Chile) Alumni |
| 13 | DF | Camila Caram (captain) | 22 April 1989 (aged 33) | 244 | (Chile) Prince of Wales Country Club |
| 14 | FW | Francisca Tala | 20 October 1994 (aged 27) | 128 | (Chile) Alumni |
| 15 | DF | Mariana Lagos | 29 August 1992 (aged 29) | 89 | (Germany) Zehlendorfer Wespen |
| 16 | MF | Constanza Palma | 29 March 1992 (aged 30) | 179 | (Chile) Universidad Católica |
| 19 | MF | Agustina Solano | 5 April 1995 (aged 27) | 65 | (Chile) Universidad Católica |
| 20 | FW | Francisca Parra | 6 October 1999 (aged 22) | 33 | (Chile) Universidad Católica |
| 22 | MF | Paula Valdivia | 5 June 1997 (aged 25) | 38 | (Chile) Club Manquehue |
| 25 | FW | María Maldonado | 13 August 1997 (aged 24) | 68 | (Chile) Prince of Wales Country Club |
| 26 | FW | Fernanda Arrieta | 27 January 2001 (aged 21) | 16 | (Chile) Club Manquehue |
| 28 | GK | Natalia Salvador | 28 September 1993 (aged 28) | 57 | (Chile) Universidad Católica |
| 30 | FW | Josefina Khamis | 26 September 1993 (aged 28) | 21 | (Chile) COBS & COGS |

=== Germany ===
The squad was announced on 13 June 2022.

Head coach: Valentin Altenburg

| No. | Pos. | Player | Date of birth (age) | Caps | Goals | Club |
|---|---|---|---|---|---|---|
| 2 | DF | Kira Horn | 12 February 1995 (aged 27) | 49 | 2 | (Netherlands) Amsterdam |
| 3 | MF | Amelie Wortmann | 21 October 1996 (aged 25) | 76 | 4 | (Germany) UHC Hamburg |
| 4 | MF | Nike Lorenz (captain) | 12 March 1997 (aged 25) | 141 | 37 | (Germany) Rot-Weiss Köln |
| 5 | DF | Selin Oruz | 5 February 1997 (aged 25) | 120 | 2 | (Germany) Düsseldorfer HC |
| 8 | MF | Anne Schröder | 11 September 1994 (aged 27) | 174 | 16 | (Germany) Club an der Alster |
| 9 | MF | Elisa Gräve | 18 October 1996 (aged 25) | 89 | 5 | (Germany) Düsseldorfer HC |
| 11 | MF | Lena Micheel | 29 April 1998 (aged 24) | 68 | 16 | (Germany) UHC Hamburg |
| 12 | FW | Charlotte Stapenhorst | 15 June 1995 (aged 27) | 128 | 35 | (Germany) Zehlendorfer Wespen |
| 15 | GK | Nathalie Kubalski | 3 September 1993 (aged 28) | 30 | 0 | (Germany) Düsseldorfer HC |
| 16 | DF | Sonja Zimmermann (captain) | 15 June 1999 (aged 23) | 55 | 16 | (Germany) Mannheimer HC |
| 17 | FW | Pauline Heinz | 1 May 2001 (aged 21) | 24 | 2 | (Germany) Rüsselsheimer RK |
| 20 | GK | Julia Sonntag | 1 November 1991 (aged 30) | 73 | 0 | (Germany) Rot-Weiss Köln |
| 22 | FW | Cécile Pieper | 31 August 1994 (aged 27) | 147 | 15 | (Netherlands) HGC |
| 24 | FW | Pia Maertens | 6 January 1996 (aged 26) | 60 | 26 | (Germany) Rot-Weiss Köln |
| 25 | DF | Viktoria Huse | 24 October 1995 (aged 26) | 81 | 11 | (Germany) Club an der Alster |
| 28 | FW | Jette Fleschütz | 23 October 2002 (aged 19) | 24 | 3 | (Germany) Großflottbeker THGC |
| 30 | DF | Hanna Granitzki | 31 July 1997 (aged 24) | 78 | 4 | (Germany) Club an der Alster |
| 31 | MF | Linnea Weidemann | 15 September 2003 (aged 18) | 7 | 0 | (Germany) Berliner HC |
| 35 | FW | Benedetta Wenzel | 31 March 1997 (aged 25) | 20 | 1 | (Germany) Berliner HC |
| 71 | MF | Laura Saenger | 1 September 1994 (aged 27) | 7 | 0 | (Germany) Harvestehuder THC |

=== Ireland ===
The squad was announced on 17 June 2022.

Head coach: (Australia) Sean Dancer

| No. | Pos. | Player | Date of birth (age) | Caps | Club |
|---|---|---|---|---|---|
| 1 | GK | Ayeisha McFerran | 10 January 1996 (aged 26) | 114 | (Netherlands) Kampong |
| 2 | GK | Elizabeth Murphy | 28 June 1998 (aged 24) | 13 | (Republic of Ireland) Loreto |
| 3 | MF | Sarah McAuley | 25 September 2001 (aged 20) | 10 | (Republic of Ireland) UCD |
| 4 | MF | Zara Malseed | 11 June 1997 (aged 25) | 8 | (Republic of Ireland) Ards |
| 5 | MF | Michelle Carey | 5 May 1999 (aged 23) | 11 | (Republic of Ireland) UCD |
| 6 | DF | Róisín Upton | 1 April 1994 (aged 28) | 90 | (Republic of Ireland) Catholic Institute |
| 8 | MF | Sarah Hawkshaw | 4 November 1995 (aged 26) | 47 | (Republic of Ireland) Railway Union |
| 9 | FW | Kathryn Mullan (captain) | 7 April 1994 (aged 28) | 207 | (Republic of Ireland) Ballymoney |
| 10 | DF | Hannah McLoughlin | 2 December 1999 (aged 22) | 27 | (Republic of Ireland) UCD |
| 11 | FW | Sarah Torrans | 14 February 1999 (aged 23) | 34 | (Republic of Ireland) Loreto |
| 12 | DF | Elena Tice | 16 November 1997 (aged 24) | 123 | (Republic of Ireland) Old Alex |
| 13 | FW | Naomi Carroll | 13 September 1992 (aged 29) | 122 | (Republic of Ireland) Catholic Institute |
| 16 | DF | Charlotte Beggs | 16 September 2002 (aged 19) | 1 | (Republic of Ireland) Ulster Elks |
| 19 | DF | Caoimhe Perdue | 4 May 2000 (aged 22) | 1 | (Republic of Ireland) UCC |
| 21 | FW | Katie McKee | 27 September 1999 (aged 22) | 1 | (Republic of Ireland) Pegasus |
| 24 | | Erin Getty | 5 July 1998 (aged 23) | 11 | |
| 25 | | Siofra O'Brien | 22 February 2000 (aged 22) | 0 | |
| 28 | FW | Deirdre Duke | 9 June 1992 (aged 30) | 155 | (Republic of Ireland) Old Alex |
| 29 | MF | Ellen Curran | 4 March 1998 (aged 24) | 28 | (Republic of Ireland) Pembroke |
| 30 | DF | Christina Hamill | 31 January 2000 (aged 22) | 1 | (Republic of Ireland) Loreto |

=== Netherlands ===
The squad was announced on 7 June 2022.

Head coach: (Germany) Jamilon Mülders

| No. | Pos. | Player | Date of birth (age) | Caps | Goals | Club |
|---|---|---|---|---|---|---|
| 1 | GK | Anne Veenendaal | 7 September 1995 (aged 26) | 89 | 0 | (Netherlands) Amsterdam |
| 3 | DF | Sanne Koolen | 23 March 1996 (aged 26) | 67 | 0 | (Netherlands) Den Bosch |
| 4 | FW | Freeke Moes | 29 November 1998 (aged 23) | 22 | 6 | (Netherlands) Amsterdam |
| 6 | MF | Laurien Leurink | 13 November 1994 (aged 27) | 128 | 28 | (Netherlands) SCHC |
| 7 | MF | Xan de Waard (captain) | 8 November 1995 (aged 26) | 176 | 17 | (Netherlands) SCHC |
| 8 | MF | Marloes Keetels (captain) | 4 May 1993 (aged 29) | 171 | 25 | (Netherlands) Den Bosch |
| 10 | FW | Felice Albers | 27 December 1999 (aged 22) | 27 | 15 | (Netherlands) Amsterdam |
| 11 | FW | Maria Verschoor | 22 April 1994 (aged 28) | 164 | 25 | (Netherlands) Amsterdam |
| 12 | FW | Lidewij Welten | 16 July 1990 (aged 31) | 238 | 93 | (Netherlands) Den Bosch |
| 15 | FW | Frédérique Matla | 28 December 1996 (aged 25) | 99 | 73 | (Netherlands) Den Bosch |
| 18 | DF | Pien Sanders (captain) | 11 June 1998 (aged 24) | 83 | 1 | (Netherlands) Den Bosch |
| 20 | DF | Laura Nunnink | 26 January 1995 (aged 27) | 152 | 2 | (Netherlands) Den Bosch |
| 22 | GK | Josine Koning | 2 September 1995 (aged 26) | 96 | 0 | (Netherlands) Den Bosch |
| 23 | DF | Margot van Geffen | 23 November 1989 (aged 32) | 230 | 17 | (Netherlands) Den Bosch |
| 24 | MF | Eva de Goede | 23 March 1989 (aged 33) | 253 | 32 | (Netherlands) HGC |
| 26 | FW | Joosje Burg | 29 July 1997 (aged 24) | 10 | 3 | (Netherlands) Den Bosch |
| 27 | DF | Renée van Laarhoven | 15 October 1997 (aged 24) | 23 | 1 | (Netherlands) SCHC |
| 31 | DF | Sabine Plönissen | 16 January 1995 (aged 27) | 10 | 1 | (Netherlands) Amsterdam |
| 33 | DF | Yibbi Jansen | 18 November 1999 (aged 22) | 32 | 16 | (Netherlands) SCHC |
| 38 | DF | Lisa Post | 27 January 1999 (aged 23) | 13 | 0 | (Netherlands) Oranje-Rood |

== Pool B ==
=== China ===
Head coach: (Australia) Alyson Annan

| No. | Pos. | Player | Date of birth (age) | Caps | Club |
|---|---|---|---|---|---|
| 2 | DF | Gu Bingfeng | 25 January 1994 (aged 28) | 120 | |
| 5 | MF | Li Jiaqi (captain) | 2 July 1995 (aged 26) | 118 | |
| 6 | MF | Zhang Ying | 29 August 1998 (aged 23) | 38 | |
| 7 | DF | Cui Qiuxia | 11 September 1990 (aged 31) | 196 | |
| 8 | | Gu Yangyan | 17 July 2000 (aged 21) | 14 | |
| 9 | DF | Ma Ning | 29 September 2000 (aged 21) | 19 | |
| 10 | FW | Zhang Xindan | 3 August 1997 (aged 24) | 30 | |
| 11 | FW | Liang Meiyu | 8 January 1994 (aged 28) | 200 | |
| 13 | MF | Li Hong | 31 May 1999 (aged 23) | 91 | |
| 15 | | Yuan Meng | 7 February 1996 (aged 26) | 38 | |
| 18 | FW | Chen Yanhua | 3 November 1997 (aged 24) | 9 | |
| 19 | MF | Zhang Xiaoxue | 13 December 1992 (aged 29) | 174 | |
| 21 | DF | Zheng Jiali | 1 July 1997 (aged 25) | 11 | |
| 24 | DF | Wang Na | 5 August 1994 (aged 27) | 111 | |
| 25 | MF | Yang Haoting | 16 August 1999 (aged 22) | 14 | |
| 26 | MF | Chen Yang | 15 February 1997 (aged 25) | 69 | |
| 28 | FW | Luo Tiantian | 12 July 1995 (aged 26) | 30 | |
| 29 | GK | Liu Ping | 13 October 1994 (aged 27) | 18 | |
| 31 | FW | Zhong Jiaqi | 23 September 1999 (aged 22) | 71 | |
| 32 | GK | Li Xinhuan | 5 January 1999 (aged 23) | 7 | |

=== England ===
The squad was announced on 14 June 2022.

Head coach: (Scotland) David Ralph

- Note: All caps and goals include those for Great Britain.

| No. | Pos. | Player | Date of birth (age) | Caps | Goals | Club |
|---|---|---|---|---|---|---|
| 1 | GK | Maddie Hinch | 8 October 1988 (aged 33) | 171 | 0 | (Netherlands) Tilburg |
| 2 | FW | Darcy Bourne | 13 October 2001 (aged 20) | 7 | 2 | (England) Surbiton |
| 4 | DF | Laura Unsworth | 8 March 1988 (aged 34) | 296 | 13 | (England) East Grinstead |
| 6 | DF | Anna Toman | 29 April 1993 (aged 29) | 106 | 8 | (Netherlands) SCHC |
| 7 | MF | Hannah Martin | 30 December 1994 (aged 27) | 97 | 20 | (England) Surbiton |
| 11 | MF | Holly Hunt | 15 March 1997 (aged 25) | 14 | 1 | (England) Hampstead & Westminster |
| 13 | FW | Elena Rayer | 22 November 1996 (aged 25) | 79 | 10 | (England) East Grinstead |
| 14 | FW | Tessa Howard | 6 January 1999 (aged 23) | 46 | 9 | (England) East Grinstead |
| 16 | FW | Isabelle Petter | 27 June 2000 (aged 22) | 53 | 7 | (England) Surbiton |
| 18 | DF | Giselle Ansley | 31 March 1992 (aged 30) | 183 | 27 | (Netherlands) HGC |
| 20 | DF | Hollie Pearne-Webb (captain) | 19 September 1990 (aged 31) | 213 | 11 | (England) Wimbledon |
| 21 | DF | Fiona Crackles | 11 February 2000 (aged 22) | 35 | 11 | (England) Wimbledon |
| 22 | DF | Elizabeth Neal | 8 October 1998 (aged 23) | 34 | 0 | (England) Wimbledon |
| 23 | MF | Sophie Hamilton | 28 February 2001 (aged 21) | 16 | 1 | (England) Canterbury |
| 24 | MF | Shona McCallin | 18 May 1992 (aged 30) | 108 | 3 | (Netherlands) Oranje-Rood |
| 25 | GK | Sabbie Heesh | 16 December 1991 (aged 30) | 26 | 0 | (England) Surbiton |
| 26 | FW | Lily Owsley | 10 December 1994 (aged 27) | 182 | 41 | (Netherlands) HDM |
| 31 | DF | Grace Balsdon | 13 April 1993 (aged 29) | 102 | 16 | (England) Hampstead & Westminster |
| 41 | MF | Lily Walker | 5 June 2002 (aged 20) | 11 | 0 | (England) University of Birmingham |
| 42 | FW | Alex Malzer | 19 August 2000 (aged 21) | 10 | 0 | (England) University of Nottingham |

=== India ===
The squad was announced on 21 June 2022.

Head coach: (Netherlands) Janneke Schopman

| No. | Pos. | Player | Date of birth (age) | Caps | Goals | Club |
|---|---|---|---|---|---|---|
| 1 | MF | Navjot Kaur | 7 March 1995 (aged 27) | 196 | 18 | (India) Railways |
| 2 | DF | Gurjit Kaur | 25 October 1995 (aged 26) | 112 | 78 | (India) Railways |
| 3 | DF | Deep Grace Ekka | 3 June 1994 (aged 28) | 228 | 16 | (India) Railways |
| 4 | MF | Monika Malik | 5 November 1993 (aged 28) | 178 | 12 | (India) Railways |
| 5 | MF | Sonika Tandi | 20 March 1997 (aged 25) | 47 | 6 | (India) Income Tax |
| 7 | FW | Sharmila Devi | 10 October 2001 (aged 20) | 33 | 7 | (India) Indian Oil Corporation Ltd. |
| 8 | DF | Nikki Pradhan | 8 December 1993 (aged 28) | 127 | 2 | (India) Railways |
| 11 | GK | Savita Punia (captain) | 11 July 1990 (aged 31) | 228 | 0 | (India) NCOE, Delhi |
| 15 | MF | Nisha Warsi | 9 July 1995 (aged 26) | 37 | 1 | (India) Railways |
| 16 | FW | Vandana Katariya | 15 April 1992 (aged 30) | 264 | 76 | (India) Railways |
| 17 | GK | Bichu Devi Kharibam | 3 December 2000 (aged 21) | 4 | 0 | (India) Indian Oil Corporation Ltd. |
| 18 | DF | Udita | 14 January 1998 (aged 24) | 58 | 4 | (India) Indian Oil Corporation Ltd. |
| 20 | FW | Lalremsiami | 30 March 2000 (aged 22) | 86 | 27 | (India) Railways |
| 24 | MF | Jyoti | 11 December 1999 (aged 22) | 30 | 5 | (India) Indian Oil Corporation Ltd. |
| 25 | FW | Navneet Kaur | 26 January 1996 (aged 26) | 107 | 31 | (India) Railways |
| 27 | MF | Sushila Chanu | 25 February 1992 (aged 30) | 208 | 6 | (India) Railways |
| 30 | MF | Salima Tete | 27 December 2001 (aged 20) | 53 | 2 | (India) Railways |
| 32 | MF | Neha Goyal | 15 November 1996 (aged 25) | 103 | 16 | (India) Railways |
| 42 | DF | Akshata Abaso Dhekale | 2 November 2001 (aged 20) | 4 | 0 | (India) Indian Oil Corporation Ltd. |
| 58 | FW | Sangita Kumari | 24 December 2001 (aged 20) | 6 | 2 | (India) Railways |

=== New Zealand ===
The squad was announced on 22 May 2022.

Head coach: Darren Smith

| No. | Pos. | Player | Date of birth (age) | Caps | Goals | Club |
|---|---|---|---|---|---|---|
| 1 | DF | Tarryn Davey | 29 February 1996 (aged 26) | 73 | 1 | (Netherlands) Klein Zwitserland |
| 2 | FW | Olivia Shannon | 23 May 2001 (aged 21) | 40 | 6 | (New Zealand) Central Falcons |
| 3 | MF | Alexandra Lukin | 29 May 1997 (aged 25) | 5 | 0 | (New Zealand) Hauraki Mavericks |
| 4 | FW | Olivia Merry (captain) | 16 March 1992 (aged 30) | 247 | 116 | (New Zealand) Southern Alpiners |
| 5 | DF | Frances Davies | 18 October 1996 (aged 25) | 90 | 0 | (Netherlands) Klein Zwitserland |
| 6 | FW | Hope Ralph | 14 April 2000 (aged 22) | 21 | 5 | (New Zealand) Central Falcons |
| 7 | DF | Aniwaka Haumaha | 22 April 1989 (aged 33) | 72 | 0 | (New Zealand) Central Falcons |
| 9 | MF | Ella Hyatt Brown | 4 November 1997 (aged 24) | 4 | 0 | |
| 10 | GK | Brooke Roberts | 16 February 1995 (aged 27) | 8 | 0 | (New Zealand) Northern Tridents |
| 14 | FW | Tyler Lench | 8 June 1997 (aged 25) | 4 | 0 | (New Zealand) Northern Tridents |
| 15 | GK | Grace O'Hanlon | 10 September 1992 (aged 29) | 76 | 0 | (New Zealand) Hauraki Mavericks |
| 17 | DF | Stephanie Dickins | 9 January 1995 (aged 27) | 40 | 2 | (New Zealand) Northern Tridents |
| 18 | DF | Anna Crowley | 8 February 2000 (aged 22) | 2 | 0 | (New Zealand) Southern Alpiners |
| 19 | DF | Tessa Jopp | 18 June 1995 (aged 27) | 34 | 1 | (New Zealand) Southern Alpiners |
| 20 | DF | Megan Hull (captain) | 12 May 1996 (aged 26) | 48 | 2 | (New Zealand) Central Falcons |
| 21 | MF | Alia Jaques | 20 May 1995 (aged 27) | 18 | 2 | (New Zealand) Hauraki Mavericks |
| 22 | MF | Katie Doar | 11 September 2001 (aged 20) | 28 | 0 | (New Zealand) Northern Tridents |
| 26 | DF | Kaitlin Cotter | 14 November 2001 (aged 20) | 7 | 0 | (New Zealand) Central Falcons |
| 29 | MF | Madison Doar | 29 June 1999 (aged 23) | 35 | 6 | |
| 32 | FW | Rose Tynan | 20 March 1997 (aged 25) | 4 | 2 | (New Zealand) Northern Tridents |

== Pool C ==
=== Argentina ===
The squad was announced on 31 May 2022.

Head coach: Fernando Ferrara

| No. | Pos. | Player | Date of birth (age) | Caps | Goals | Club |
|---|---|---|---|---|---|---|
| 1 | GK | Belén Succi | 16 October 1985 (aged 36) | 263 | 0 | (Argentina) River Plate |
| 2 | MF | Sofía Toccalino | 20 March 1997 (aged 25) | 121 | 7 | (Belgium) Antwerp |
| 3 | DF | Agustina Gorzelany | 11 March 1996 (aged 26) | 81 | 37 | (Spain) Taburiente |
| 4 | DF | Valentina Raposo | 28 January 2003 (aged 19) | 25 | 2 | (Argentina) River Plate |
| 5 | MF | Agostina Alonso (captain) | 1 October 1995 (aged 26) | 116 | 6 | (Argentina) Banco Nación |
| 6 | DF | Emilia Forcherio | 16 February 1995 (aged 27) | 17 | 0 | (Argentina) Lomas |
| 7 | FW | Agustina Albertario | 1 January 1993 (aged 29) | 196 | 58 | (Argentina) Lomas |
| 10 | FW | María José Granatto | 21 April 1995 (aged 27) | 162 | 84 | (Argentina) Santa Bárbara |
| 14 | GK | Clara Barberi | 19 April 1992 (aged 30) | 5 | 0 | (Argentina) Lomas |
| 17 | MF | Rocío Sánchez Moccia (captain) | 2 August 1988 (aged 33) | 275 | 19 | (Argentina) Liceo Naval |
| 18 | MF | Victoria Sauze (captain) | 21 July 1991 (aged 30) | 111 | 2 | (Netherlands) Victoria |
| 20 | MF | Sofía Cairó | 8 October 2002 (aged 19) | 5 | 0 | (Argentina) Mariano Moreno |
| 21 | FW | Victoria Granatto | 9 April 1991 (aged 31) | 46 | 13 | (Argentina) Santa Bárbara |
| 22 | MF | Eugenia Trinchinetti | 17 July 1997 (aged 24) | 131 | 20 | (Argentina) San Fernando |
| 25 | MF | Jimena Cedrés | 12 January 1993 (aged 29) | 108 | 7 | (Belgium) Dragons |
| 28 | FW | Julieta Jankunas | 20 January 1999 (aged 23) | 130 | 49 | (Netherlands) Victoria |
| 31 | MF | Valentina Marcucci | 21 February 1998 (aged 24) | 10 | 0 | (Argentina) Lomas |
| 32 | DF | Valentina Costa Biondi | 13 September 1995 (aged 26) | 64 | 4 | (Argentina) San Fernando |
| 39 | FW | Delfina Thome | 10 September 1996 (aged 25) | 24 | 3 | (Argentina) Liceo Rugby Club |
| 46 | FW | Daiana Pacheco | 4 April 2002 (aged 20) | 6 | 0 | (Argentina) River Plate |

=== Canada ===
The squad was announced on 7 June 2022.

Head coach: Rob Short

| No. | Pos. | Player | Date of birth (age) | Caps | Goals | Club |
|---|---|---|---|---|---|---|
| 3 | MF | Thora Rae | 15 October 1999 (aged 22) | 18 | 4 | (Canada) UBC Thunderbirds |
| 5 | DF | Alison Lee | 24 December 1994 (aged 27) | 65 | 2 | (Canada) Toronto Toros |
| 6 | MF | Jordyn Faiczak | 2 April 1999 (aged 23) | 30 | 7 | (Canada) UBC Thunderbirds |
| 7 | MF | Anna Mollenhauer | 18 September 1999 (aged 22) | 28 | 1 | (Canada) Victoria Vikes |
| 9 | FW | Madison Thompson | 11 August 1994 (aged 27) | 9 | 4 | (Canada) Polar Bears |
| 10 | DF | Kathleen Leahy | 29 October 1993 (aged 28) | 72 | 2 | (Canada) Victoria Vikes |
| 12 | DF | Sara Goodman | 22 October 1999 (aged 22) | 20 | 0 | (Canada) UBC Thunderbirds |
| 13 | FW | Hannah Haughn | 4 September 1994 (aged 27) | 192 | 36 | (Canada) West Vancouver |
| 14 | DF | Karli Johansen | 26 March 1992 (aged 30) | 153 | 34 | (Canada) West Vancouver |
| 15 | FW | Grace Delmotte | 26 July 2002 (aged 19) | 1 | 0 | (United States) Wake Forest Demon Deacons |
| 16 | MF | Natalie Sourisseau (captain) | 5 December 1992 (aged 29) | 158 | 10 | (Canada) Polar Bears |
| 17 | DF | Sara McManus | 14 August 1993 (aged 28) | 196 | 30 | (Canada) West Vancouver |
| 18 | DF | Alexis de Armond | 4 April 1997 (aged 25) | 30 | 0 | (Canada) West Vancouver |
| 19 | MF | Audrey Sawers | 22 November 1999 (aged 22) | 9 | 0 | (United States) Lafayette Leopards |
| 21 | MF | Amanda Woodcroft | 9 October 1993 (aged 28) | 134 | 10 | (Canada) Polar Bears |
| 22 | MF | Madeline Secco | 15 March 1994 (aged 28) | 148 | 19 | (United States) Stanford Cardinal |
| 23 | FW | Brienne Stairs | 22 December 1989 (aged 32) | 182 | 116 | (Canada) Guelph Gryphons |
| 25 | DF | Shanlee Johnston | 5 February 1990 (aged 32) | 134 | 9 | (Canada) Polar Bears |
| 31 | GK | Rowan Harris | 11 August 1996 (aged 25) | 50 | 0 | (Canada) Vancouver Hawks |
| 34 | GK | Marcia LaPlante | 20 August 1997 (aged 24) | 3 | 0 | (Canada) Polar Bears |

=== South Korea ===
Head coach: Han Jin-su

| No. | Pos. | Player | Date of birth (age) | Caps | Club |
|---|---|---|---|---|---|
| 2 | | Kim Min-ji | 11 April 1999 (aged 23) | 5 | |
| 3 | | Jung Che-young | 3 March 1999 (aged 23) | 5 | |
| 6 | | Ji Yu-jin | 8 December 2000 (aged 21) | 1 | |
| 7 | | Seo Jung-eun | 26 December 1991 (aged 30) | 67 | |
| 8 | | Park Seo-yeon | 14 August 2004 (aged 17) | 0 | |
| 10 | | Cheon Eun-bi (captain) | 7 February 1992 (aged 30) | 131 | |
| 11 | | Kang Ji-na | 10 January 1993 (aged 29) | 27 | |
| 13 | | Choi Su-ji | 14 June 1993 (aged 29) | 39 | |
| 14 | | Lee Yu-ri | 6 September 1994 (aged 27) | 86 | |
| 16 | | Kim Jeong-in | 30 November 1998 (aged 23) | 16 | |
| 17 | | Seo Su-young | 30 January 1996 (aged 26) | 1 | |
| 19 | | Cho Hye-jin | 16 January 1995 (aged 27) | 95 | |
| 20 | | Kim Hyun-ji | 4 November 1993 (aged 28) | 104 | |
| 22 | | An Su-jin | 9 January 2002 (aged 20) | 1 | |
| 23 | | Kim Seo-na | 23 September 2000 (aged 21) | 22 | |
| 26 | | Lee Ju-yeon | 12 February 2001 (aged 21) | 5 | |
| 27 | | Pak Ho-jeong | 27 March 1996 (aged 26) | 10 | |
| 28 | | Lee Seung-ju | 7 November 1995 (aged 26) | 28 | |
| 30 | GK | Lee Jin-min | 13 November 1993 (aged 28) | 10 | |
| 31 | GK | Kim Eun-ji | 9 February 2000 (aged 22) | 0 | |

=== Spain ===
The squad was announced on 13 June 2022.

Head coach: (England) Adrian Lock

| No. | Pos. | Player | Date of birth (age) | Caps | Goals | Club |
|---|---|---|---|---|---|---|
| 2 | MF | Laura Barrios | 4 September 2000 (aged 21) | 26 | 4 | (Spain) Club de Campo |
| 4 | FW | Sara Barrios | 4 September 2000 (aged 21) | 13 | 1 | (Spain) Club de Campo |
| 7 | | Júlia Strappato | 16 January 2000 (aged 22) | 17 | – | (Spain) Junior |
| 8 | MF | Lucía Jiménez | 8 January 1997 (aged 25) | 150 | 9 | (Spain) Complutense |
| 9 | DF | María López (captain) | 16 February 1990 (aged 32) | 220 | – | (Spain) Club de Campo |
| 10 | FW | Belén Iglesias | 6 July 1996 (aged 25) | 76 | 16 | (Germany) Großflottbeker THGC |
| 11 | FW | Marta Segú | 22 June 1995 (aged 27) | 86 | 18 | (Spain) Real Club de Polo |
| 12 | FW | Florencia Amundson | 12 February 1998 (aged 24) | 11 | – | (Spain) Real Club de Polo |
| 13 | DF | Constanza Amundson | 12 February 1998 (aged 24) | 12 | 0 | (Spain) Real Club de Polo |
| 15 | MF | Maialen García | 5 April 1990 (aged 32) | 114 | 6 | (Spain) Junior |
| 16 | DF | Candela Mejías | 27 January 1997 (aged 25) | 47 | 1 | (Spain) Club de Campo |
| 17 | DF | Clara Ycart | 10 January 1999 (aged 23) | 67 | 6 | (Germany) Düsseldorfer HC |
| 19 | FW | Begoña García | 19 July 1995 (aged 26) | 159 | 38 | (Spain) Club de Campo |
| 20 | DF | Xantal Giné | 23 September 1992 (aged 29) | 175 | – | (Spain) Real Club de Polo |
| 21 | MF | Beatriz Pérez | 4 May 1991 (aged 31) | 232 | – | (Spain) Club de Campo |
| 22 | MF | Laia Vidosa | 8 January 1999 (aged 23) | 15 | 0 | (Spain) Junior |
| 23 | MF | Georgina Oliva (captain) | 18 July 1990 (aged 31) | 262 | – | (Spain) Junior |
| 24 | FW | Alejandra Torres-Quevedo | 30 September 1999 (aged 22) | 64 | 3 | (Spain) Club de Campo |
| 29 | GK | Melanie García | 21 September 1990 (aged 31) | 85 | 0 | (Spain) Real Club de Polo |
| 32 | GK | Jana Martínez | 25 October 2002 (aged 19) | 7 | 0 | (Spain) Junior |

== Pool D ==
=== Australia ===
The squad was announced on 26 May 2022. Brooke Peris and Meg Pearce were ruled out prior to the tournament due to injury and were replaced by Greta Hayes and Renee Taylor.

Head coach: Katrina Powell

| No. | Pos. | Player | Date of birth (age) | Caps | Goals | Club |
|---|---|---|---|---|---|---|
| 1 | MF | Claire Colwill | 19 September 2003 (aged 18) | 4 | 0 | (Australia) Brisbane Blaze |
| 2 | FW | Ambrosia Malone | 8 January 1998 (aged 24) | 64 | 17 | (Australia) Brisbane Blaze |
| 4 | MF | Amy Lawton | 19 January 2002 (aged 20) | 26 | 3 | (Australia) HC Melbourne |
| 6 | DF | Penny Squibb | 9 February 1993 (aged 29) | 16 | 2 | (Australia) Perth Thundersticks |
| 7 | GK | Aleisha Power | 1 January 1997 (aged 25) | 6 | 0 | (Australia) Perth Thundersticks |
| 8 | MF | Georgia Wilson | 20 May 1996 (aged 26) | 48 | 0 | (Australia) Perth Thundersticks |
| 9 | FW | Shanea Tonkin | 28 April 1997 (aged 25) | 4 | 1 | (Australia) Perth Thundersticks |
| 10 | DF | Madison Fitzpatrick | 14 December 1996 (aged 25) | 90 | 19 | (Australia) Brisbane Blaze |
| 12 | MF | Greta Hayes | 17 October 1996 (aged 25) | 20 | 0 | (Australia) NSW Pride |
| 13 | DF | Harriet Shand | 11 January 2000 (aged 22) | 3 | 0 | (Australia) Adelaide Fire |
| 14 | FW | Stephanie Kershaw | 19 April 1995 (aged 27) | 77 | 10 | (Australia) Brisbane Blaze |
| 15 | DF | Kaitlin Nobbs (captain) | 24 September 1997 (aged 24) | 92 | 4 | (Australia) NSW Pride |
| 18 | MF | Jane Claxton (captain) | 26 October 1992 (aged 29) | 196 | 18 | (Australia) Adelaide Fire |
| 19 | GK | Jocelyn Bartram | 4 May 1993 (aged 29) | 58 | 0 | (Australia) NSW Pride |
| 20 | DF | Karri Somerville | 7 April 1999 (aged 23) | 17 | 0 | (Australia) Perth Thundersticks |
| 21 | MF | Renee Taylor | 28 September 1996 (aged 25) | 93 | 8 | (Australia) Brisbane Blaze |
| 24 | FW | Mariah Williams | 31 May 1995 (aged 27) | 97 | 18 | (Australia) NSW Pride |
| 28 | FW | Hannah Cullum-Sanders | 30 July 2003 (aged 18) | 4 | 0 | |
| 29 | FW | Rebecca Greiner | 13 June 1999 (aged 23) | 21 | 2 | (Australia) Brisbane Blaze |
| 30 | FW | Grace Stewart (captain) | 28 April 1997 (aged 25) | 91 | 27 | (Australia) NSW Pride |

=== Belgium ===
The squad was announced on 15 June 2022.

Head coach: (Netherlands) Raoul Ehren

| No. | Pos. | Player | Date of birth (age) | Caps | Club |
|---|---|---|---|---|---|
| 3 | FW | Justine Rasir | 4 December 2001 (aged 20) | 29 | (Belgium) Racing |
| 5 | DF | Abigail Raye | 17 May 1991 (aged 31) | 42 | (Belgium) KHC Dragons |
| 6 | MF | Charlotte Englebert | 20 May 2001 (aged 21) | 32 | (Belgium) Racing |
| 7 | DF | Judith Vandermeiren | 10 August 1994 (aged 27) | 195 | (Belgium) Braxgata |
| 8 | DF | Emma Puvrez | 25 July 1997 (aged 24) | 160 | (Belgium) Racing |
| 10 | FW | Louise Versavel | 29 April 1995 (aged 27) | 213 | (Belgium) Braxgata |
| 13 | MF | Alix Gerniers (captain) | 29 June 1993 (aged 29) | 231 | (Belgium) Gantoise |
| 16 | MF | Tiphaine Duquesne | 22 August 1996 (aged 25) | 62 | (Belgium) Waterloo Ducks |
| 17 | MF | Michelle Struijk (captain) | 24 June 1998 (aged 24) | 87 | (Belgium) Antwerp |
| 19 | MF | Barbara Nelen (captain) | 20 August 1991 (aged 30) | 284 | (Belgium) Gantoise |
| 21 | GK | Aisling D'Hooghe | 25 August 1994 (aged 27) | 207 | (Belgium) Waterloo Ducks |
| 22 | DF | Stéphanie Vanden Borre | 14 September 1997 (aged 24) | 150 | (Belgium) Gantoise |
| 23 | GK | Elena Sotgiu | 18 July 1995 (aged 26) | 63 | (Belgium) Braxgata |
| 25 | MF | Pauline Leclef | 31 May 1995 (aged 27) | 114 | (Netherlands) Oranje-Rood |
| 26 | DF | Lien Hillewaert | 27 November 1997 (aged 24) | 104 | (Belgium) Waterloo Ducks |
| 30 | FW | Ambre Ballenghien | 13 December 2000 (aged 21) | 57 | (Belgium) Gantoise |
| 31 | DF | Lucie Breyne | 5 October 2000 (aged 21) | 26 | (Belgium) Waterloo Ducks |
| 33 | FW | Alexia 't Serstevens | 9 November 1999 (aged 22) | 32 | (Belgium) Braxgata |
| 36 | DF | Hélène Brasseur | 4 January 2002 (aged 20) | 24 | (Belgium) Gantoise |
| 37 | FW | France de Mot | 30 January 2002 (aged 20) | 18 | (Belgium) Racing |

=== Japan ===
The squad was announced on 7 June 2022.

Head coach: (India) Jude Menezes

| No. | Pos. | Player | Date of birth (age) | Caps | Goals | Club |
|---|---|---|---|---|---|---|
| 1 | GK | Eika Nakamura | 4 March 1996 (aged 26) | 15 | 0 | (Japan) Coca Cola Red Sparks |
| 2 | MF | Natsuha Matsumoto | 31 July 1995 (aged 26) | 57 | 4 | (Japan) Coca Cola Red Sparks |
| 5 | DF | Yu Asai | 8 January 1996 (aged 26) | 92 | 1 | (Japan) Coca Cola Red Sparks |
| 6 | DF | Emi Nishikori | 9 January 1993 (aged 29) | 78 | 5 | (Japan) Coca Cola Red Sparks |
| 7 | DF | Miyu Suzuki | 8 January 1999 (aged 23) | 35 | 3 | (Japan) Sony HC Bravia Ladies |
| 8 | MF | Moeka Tsubouchi | 28 December 1996 (aged 25) | 12 | 1 | (Japan) Sony HC Bravia Ladies |
| 9 | FW | Yuri Nagai (captain) | 26 May 1992 (aged 30) | 193 | 32 | (Japan) Sony HC Bravia Ladies |
| 10 | MF | Hazuki Nagai | 15 August 1994 (aged 27) | 182 | 29 | |
| 11 | DF | Shihori Oikawa | 12 March 1989 (aged 33) | 147 | 21 | (Japan) Tokyo Verdy Hockey Team |
| 13 | DF | Miki Kozuka | 13 January 1996 (aged 26) | 79 | 1 | (Japan) Glaxo Smith Kline Orange United |
| 14 | MF | Maho Segawa | 23 June 1996 (aged 26) | 60 | 1 | (Japan) Tokyo Verdy Hockey Team |
| 17 | FW | Shiho Kobayakawa | 12 April 1999 (aged 23) | 16 | | (Japan) Coca Cola Red Sparks |
| 18 | FW | Kaho Tanaka | 25 October 1997 (aged 24) | 9 | 7 | (Japan) Sony HC Bravia Ladies |
| 19 | FW | Kanon Mori | 1 May 1996 (aged 26) | 42 | 6 | (Japan) Coca Cola Red Sparks |
| 21 | FW | Mai Toriyama | 13 April 1995 (aged 27) | 29 | 7 | (Japan) Nanto Ginko Shooting Stars |
| 25 | DF | Kana Urata | 27 December 1998 (aged 23) | 22 | | (Japan) Coca Cola Red Sparks |
| 26 | MF | Amiru Shimada | 23 June 1998 (aged 24) | 11 | 4 | (Japan) Nanto Ginko Shooting Stars |
| 27 | GK | Akio Tanaka | 10 September 1997 (aged 24) | 22 | 0 | (Japan) Coca Cola Red Sparks |
| 28 | | Rui Takashima | 21 November 1999 (aged 22) | 0 | 0 | |
| 29 | MF | Sakurako Omoto | 19 March 1998 (aged 24) | 44 | 1 | (Japan) Coca Cola Red Sparks |

=== South Africa ===
The squad was announced on 10 May 2022.

Head coach: Giles Bonnet

| No. | Pos. | Player | Date of birth (age) | Caps | Club |
|---|---|---|---|---|---|
| 5 | FW | Edith Molikoe | 23 May 2000 (aged 22) | 5 | (South Africa) Tuks |
| 7 | MF | Marizen Marais | 17 May 1996 (aged 26) | 36 | (South Africa) Crusaders |
| 8 | MF | Kristen Paton | 21 December 1996 (aged 25) | 43 | (South Africa) UJ |
| 9 | MF | Robyn Johnson | 7 December 1990 (aged 31) | 28 | (South Africa) WITS |
| 10 | MF | Onthatile Zulu | 14 March 2000 (aged 22) | 14 | (South Africa) Tuks |
| 13 | DF | Lisa-Marié Deetlefs | 8 September 1987 (aged 34) | 271 | (South Africa) Eastside Mavericks |
| 16 | DF | Erin Christie | 20 March 1992 (aged 30) | 63 | (South Africa) Crusaders |
| 18 | DF | Hannah Pearce | 17 November 1998 (aged 23) | 16 | (United States) Harvard |
| 19 | FW | Lilian du Plessis | 17 December 1992 (aged 29) | 145 | |
| 23 | MF | Bernadette Coston (captain) | 17 August 1989 (aged 32) | 155 | (South Africa) Crusaders |
| 24 | GK | Phumelela Mbande (captain) | 8 March 1993 (aged 29) | 57 | |
| 28 | MF | Quanita Bobbs | 3 September 1993 (aged 28) | 142 | (South Africa) WPCC |
| 29 | FW | Tarryn Lombard | 23 January 1995 (aged 27) | 52 | (South Africa) WPCC |
| 31 | FW | Bianca Wood | 20 February 2000 (aged 22) | 12 | |
| 34 | | Christa Ramasimong | 3 June 2000 (aged 22) | 0 | (South Africa) NWU |
| 35 | DF | Jean-Leigh du Toit | 18 January 2000 (aged 22) | 0 | (South Africa) Tuks |
| 36 | DF | Shirndré-Lee Simmons | 8 March 1997 (aged 25) | 5 | (South Africa) Kovseis |
| 38 | MF | Kayla de Waal | 11 June 2000 (aged 22) | 0 | (South Africa) Maties |
| 40 | MF | Hanrie Louw | 15 December 2001 (aged 20) | 5 | (South Africa) Tuks |
| 41 | GK | Nepo Serage | 14 April 2000 (aged 22) | 0 | (South Africa) UCT |
