= India women's national field hockey team results (2021–2024) =

- Season: 2021–2024

This page documents the international match results of the India women's national field hockey team from 2021 to 2024. The results are organized chronologically by year and competition and include India's matches in major international tournaments and other unofficial fixtures during the period.

India finished fourth at the Tokyo 2020, repeating their best performance at the Moscow 1980. They also finished third at their debut 2021–22 Pro League season. India added fourth bronze to their cabinet in the 2022 Asian Games.

India failed to secure the spot in the Paris 2024, after finishing fourth in the qualifiers.

Competition	1st place, gold medalist(s)	2nd place, silver medalist(s)	3rd place, bronze medalist(s)
Asian Games	0	0	1
Pro League	0	0	1
Asia Cup	0	0	1
Asian Champions Trophy	2	0	0
Commonwealth Games	0	0	1
Nations Cup	1	0	0
Total	3	0	4

== List of tours ==
Year	Host(s)	Competition	GP	W	D	L	GF	GA	Result	Position	Head Coach
2021	Argentina	Argentina Test Series	8	0	4	4	9	14	–	–	(Netherlands) Sjoerd Marijne
2021	Germany	Germany Test Series	4	0	0	4	1	10	–	–	(Netherlands) Sjoerd Marijne
2021	Japan	2020 Olympics	8	3	0	5	12	20	Semi finals	4th	(Netherlands) Sjoerd Marijne
2021	South Korea	2021 Women's Asian Champions Trophy	1	1	0	0	13	0	Withdrawn	–	(Netherlands) Janneke Schopman
2022	Oman	2022 Women's Hockey Asia Cup	5	3	0	2	22	6	3rd place, bronze medalist(s)	3rd	(Netherlands) Janneke Schopman
2022	N/A	2021–22 Women's FIH Pro League	14	6	4	4	33	26	3rd place, bronze medalist(s)	3rd	(Netherlands) Janneke Schopman
2022	Netherlands; Spain	2022 World Cup	6	1	3	2	9	8	Eliminated in Crossover	9th	(Netherlands) Janneke Schopman
2022	England	2022 Commonwealth Games	6	3	2	1	14	8	3rd place, bronze medalist(s)	3rd	(Netherlands) Janneke Schopman
2022	Spain	Spain Test Series	4	1	1	2	7	6	–	–	(Netherlands) Janneke Schopman
2022	Spain	2022 Nations Cup	5	4	1	0	9	3	1st place, gold medalist(s)	Champions	(Netherlands) Janneke Schopman
2023	South Africa	South Africa Test Series	7	3	1	3	21	12	–	–	(Netherlands) Janneke Schopman
2023	Australia	Australia Test Series	5	1	1	3	9	12	–	–	(Netherlands) Janneke Schopman
2023	Germany	Germany Test Series	3	0	0	3	3	9	–	–	(Netherlands) Janneke Schopman
2023	Spain	Torneo del Centenario 2023	4	2	2	0	9	3	1st place, gold medalist(s)	Champions	(Netherlands) Janneke Schopman
2023	China	2022 Asian Games	6	4	1	1	35	6	3rd place, bronze medalist(s)	3rd	(Netherlands) Janneke Schopman
2023	India	2023 Women's Asian Champions Trophy	7	7	0	0	27	3	1st place, gold medalist(s)	Champions	(Netherlands) Janneke Schopman
2023	Spain	5 Nations Tournament	4	1	0	3	6	9	–	–	(Netherlands) Janneke Schopman
2024	India	2024 Olympics Qualifier	5	2	1	2	10	6	DNQ to 2024 Olympics	4th	(Netherlands) Janneke Schopman
2024	N/A	2023–24 Women's FIH Pro League	16	2	1	13	16	38	–	8th	(Netherlands) Janneke Schopman (India) Harendra Singh
2024	India	2024 Women's Asian Champions Trophy	7	7	0	0	29	2	1st place, gold medalist(s)	Champions	(India) Harendra Singh

== 2021 ==
18 January 2021 Argentina Test Series	Argentina	2–2	India	Buenos Aires, Argentina
	Santamarina 28'; Bruggesser 48'	Report	Sharmila 22'; Ekka 31'

20 January 2021 Argentina Test Series	Argentina	1–1	India	Buenos Aires, Argentina
		Report	Rani 58'

23 January 2021 Argentina Test Series	Argentina	2–1	India	Buenos Aires, Argentina
	Pagella 11'; Gorzelany 57'	Report	Tete 54'

25 January 2021 Argentina Test Series	Argentina	3–2	India	Buenos Aires, Argentina
	Pagella 25'; Cerundolo 38'; Gorzelany 39'	Report	Tete 6'; Gurjit 42'

27 January 2021 Argentina Test Series	Argentina	3–2	India	Buenos Aires, Argentina
	Retegui 25'; Gorzelany 50'; Granatto 57'	Report	Sharmila 34'; Gurjit 40'

29 January 2021 Argentina Test Series	Argentina	2–0	India	Buenos Aires, Argentina
	D'Elía 2'; Albertario 54'	Report

30 January 2021 Argentina Test Series	Argentina	0–0	India	Buenos Aires, Argentina
		Report

31 January 2021 Argentina Test Series	Argentina	1–1	India	Buenos Aires, Argentina
	Forcherio 55'	Report	Rani 35'

27 February 2021 Germany Test Series	Germany	5–0	India	Düsseldorf, Germany
	Maertens 10', 14'; Micheel 20'; Heinz 28'; Altenburg 41'	Report

28 February 2021 Germany Test Series	Germany	1–0	India	Düsseldorf, Germany
	Wortmann 24'	Report

2 March 2021 Germany Test Series	Germany	2–0	India	Düsseldorf, Germany
	Zimmermann 26'; Hauke 42'	Report

4 March 2021 Germany Test Series	Germany	2–1	India	Düsseldorf, Germany
	Heyn 29'; Stapenhorst 37'	Report	Lalremsiami 51'

24 July 2021 2020 Olympics Pool A	Netherlands	5–1	India	Tokyo, India
	Albers 6', 43'; Van Geffen 33'; Matla 45'; Van Maasakker 52'	Report	Rani 10'	Stadium: Oi Hockey Stadium

26 July 2021 2020 Olympics Pool A	Germany	2–0	India	Tokyo, India
	Lorenz 12'; Schröder 35'	Report		Stadium: Oi Hockey Stadium

28 July 2021 2020 Olympics Pool A	Great Britain	4–1	India	Tokyo, India
	Martin 2', 19'; Owsley 41'; Balsdon 57'	Report	Sharmila 23'	Stadium: Oi Hockey Stadium

30 July 2021 2020 Olympics Pool A	Ireland	0–1	India	Tokyo, India
		Report	Navneet 57'	Stadium: Oi Hockey Stadium

31 July 2021 2020 Olympics Pool A	India	4–3	South Africa	Tokyo, India
	Vandana 4', 17', 49'; Neha 32'	Report	Glasby 15'; Hunter 30'; Marais 39'	Stadium: Oi Hockey Stadium

2 August 2021 2020 Olympics Quarter final	Australia	0–1	India	Tokyo, India
		Report	Gurjit 22'	Stadium: Oi Hockey Stadium

4 August 2021 2020 Olympics Semi final	Argentina	2–1	India	Tokyo, India
	Barrionuevo 18', 37'	Report	Gurjit 2'	Stadium: Oi Hockey Stadium

6 August 2021 2020 Olympics Bronze medal match	Great Britain	4–3	India	Tokyo, India
	Rayer 16'; Robertson 24'; Pearne-Webb 35'; Balsdon 48'	Report	Gurjit 25', 26'; Vandana 29'	Stadium: Oi Hockey Stadium

5 December 2021 2021 Asian Champions Trophy	India	13–0	Thailand	Donghae, South Korea
12:45	Gurjit 2', 14', 24', 25', 58'; Vandana 7'; Lilima 14', 24'; Jyoti 15', 36'; Rajwinder 16'; Sonika 43'; Monika 55'	Report		Stadium: Donghae City Sunrise Stadium

8 December 2021 2021 Asian Champions Trophy	South Korea	Abandoned	India	Donghae, South Korea
				Stadium: Donghae City Sunrise Stadium

9 December 2021 2021 Asian Champions Trophy	China	Abandoned	India	Donghae, South Korea
				Stadium: Donghae City Sunrise Stadium

11 December 2021 2021 Asian Champions Trophy	India	Abandoned	Japan	Donghae, South Korea
				Stadium: Donghae City Sunrise Stadium

== 2022 ==
21 January 2022 2022 Asia Cup	India	9–0	Malaysia	Muscat, Oman
20:00	Vandana 8', 34'; Ekka 10'; Sushila 15', 27'; Lalremsiami 38'; Monika 40'; Sharmila 46', 59'	Report		Stadium: Sultan Qaboos Sports Complex

23 January 2022 2022 Asia Cup	Japan	2–0	India	Muscat, Oman
19:00	Nagai 2'; S. Tanaka 42'	Report		Stadium: Sultan Qaboos Sports Complex

24 January 2022 2022 Asia Cup	India	9–1	Singapore	Muscat, Oman
19:00	Monika 6', 17'; Vandana 8'; G. Kaur 8', 37', 48'; Kujur 10'; Jyoti 43', 58'	Report	Toh 43'	Stadium: Sultan Qaboos Sports Complex

26 January 2022 2022 Asia Cup	South Korea	3–2	India	Muscat, Oman
16:30	Cheon 31'; Lee S. 45'; Cho 47'	Report	Neha 28'; Lalremsiami 54'	Stadium: Sultan Qaboos Sports Complex

28 January 2022 2022 Asia Cup	India	2–0	China	Muscat, Oman
16:30	Sharmila 13'; Gurjit 19'	Report		Stadium: Sultan Qaboos Sports Complex

31 January 2022 2021–22 FIH Pro League	China	1–7	India	Muscat, Oman
15:00	Deng 43'	Report	Navneet 5'; Neha 12'; Vandana 40'; Sushila 47', 52'; Sharmila 48'; Gurjit 50'	Stadium: Sultan Qaboos Sports Complex

1 February 2022 2021–22 FIH Pro League	China	1–2	India	Muscat, Oman
15:00	Wang 39'	Report	Gurjit 3', 49'	Stadium: Sultan Qaboos Sports Complex

26 February 2022 2021–22 FIH Pro League	India	2–1	Spain	Bhubaneswar, India
17:00	Jyoti 20'; Neha 52'	Report	Segú 18'	Stadium: Kalinga Stadium

27 February 2022 2021–22 FIH Pro League	India	3–4	Spain	Bhubaneswar, India
17:00	Sangita 10'; Salima 22'; Namita 49'	Report	B. Garcia 4'; M. García 15'; Iglesias 24'; Giné 60'	Stadium: Kalinga Stadium

12 March 2022 2021–22 FIH Pro League	India	1–1 (1–2 p)	Germany	Bhubaneswar, India
17:00	Navneet 4'	Report	Sippel 5'	Stadium: Kalinga Stadium
	Penalties
	Sharmila (penalty shoot-out missed); Navneet (penalty shoot-out scored); Neha (penalty shoot-out missed); Lalremsiami (penalty shoot-out missed); Monika (penalty shoot-out missed)		(penalty shoot-out missed) Fleschütz; (penalty shoot-out scored) Heinz; (penalty shoot-out scored) Strauss; (penalty shoot-out missed) Wiedermann; (penalty shoot-out missed) Nolte

13 March 2022 2021–22 FIH Pro League	India	1–1 (3–0 p)	Germany	Bhubaneswar, India
17:00	Nisha 40'	Report	Wiedermann 29'	Stadium: Kalinga Stadium
	Penalties
	Salima (penalty shoot-out scored); Sangita (penalty shoot-out scored); Sonika (penalty shoot-out scored)		(penalty shoot-out missed) Stoffelsma; (penalty shoot-out missed) Frerichs; (penalty shoot-out missed) Strauss

8 April 2022 2021–22 FIH Pro League	India	2–1	Netherlands	Bhubaneswar, India
19:30	Neha 11'; Sonika 28'	Report	Jansen 40'	Stadium: Kalinga Stadium

9 April 2022 2021–22 FIH Pro League	India	1–1 (1–3 p)	Netherlands	Bhubaneswar, India
15:30	Rajwinder 1'	Report	Jansen 54'	Stadium: Kalinga Stadium
	Penalties
	Jyoti (penalty shoot-out missed); Neha (penalty shoot-out missed); Navneet (penalty shoot-out scored); Rajwinder (penalty shoot-out missed)		(penalty shoot-out scored) Jansen; (penalty shoot-out scored) Fortuin; (penalty shoot-out missed) Morgenstern; (penalty shoot-out scored) Barentsen

11 June 2022 2021–22 FIH Pro League	Belgium	2–1	India	Antwerp, Belgium
14:00	Nelen 3'; Ballenghien 35'	Report	Lalremsiami 48'	Stadium: Wilrijkse Plein Antwerp

12 June 2022 2021–22 FIH Pro League	Belgium	5–0	India	Antwerp, Belgium
14:00	Nelen 2'; Englebert 4'; Raye 19'; Vanden Borre 23'; Ballenghien 36'	Report		Stadium: Wilrijkse Plein Antwerp

18 June 2022 2021–22 FIH Pro League	India	3–3 (2–1 p)	Argentina	Rotterdam, Netherlands
14:00	Lalremsiami 4'; Gurjit 37', 51'	Report	Gorzelany 22', 37', 45'	Stadium: Hazelaarweg Stadion
	Penalties
	Sharmila (penalty shoot-out missed); Neha (penalty shoot-out scored); Monika (penalty shoot-out missed); Sonika (penalty shoot-out scored)		(penalty shoot-out missed) Jankunas; (penalty shoot-out missed) M. Granatto; (penalty shoot-out missed) Sánchez Moccia; (penalty shoot-out scored) V. Granatto; (penalty shoot-out missed) Albertario

19 June 2022 2021–22 FIH Pro League	India	2–3	Argentina	Rotterdam, Netherlands
14:00	Salima 23'; Grace 48'	Report	Thome 38'; Trinchinetti 41'; Gorzelany 43'	Stadium: Hazelaarweg Stadion

21 June 2022 2021–22 FIH Pro League	United States	2–4	India	Rotterdam, Netherlands
16:30	Grega 28'; Konerth 45+'	Report	Grace 31'; Navneet 32'; Sonika 40'; Vandana 50'	Stadium: Hazelaarweg Stadion

22 June 2022 2021–22 FIH Pro League	United States	0–4	India	Rotterdam, Netherlands
16:30		Report	Vandana 39', 54'; Sonika 54'; Sangita 57'	Stadium: Hazelaarweg Stadion

3 July 2022 2022 World Cup	England	1–1	India	Amstelveen, Netherlands
16:30	Petter 9'	Report	Vandana 28'	Stadium: Wagener Stadium

5 July 2022 2022 World Cup	India	1–1	China	Amstelveen, Netherlands
16:30	Vandana 45'	Report	Zheng 26'	Stadium: Wagener Stadium

7 July 2022 2022 World Cup	India	3–4	New Zealand	Amstelveen, Netherlands
16:30	Vandana 4'; Lalremsiami 44'; Gurjit 59'	Report	Merry 12', 54'; Jopp 29'; Davies 32'	Stadium: Wagener Stadium

10 July 2022 2022 World Cup	Spain	1–0	India	Terrassa, Spain
21:30	Segú 57'	Report		Stadium: Estadi Olímpic de Terrassa

11 July 2022 2022 World Cup	Canada	1–1 (2–3 p)	India	Terrassa, Spain
21:30	Secco 11'	Report	Salima 58'	Stadium: Estadi Olímpic de Terrassa
	Penalties
	Woodcroft (penalty shoot-out scored); Secco (penalty shoot-out missed); Sourisseau (penalty shoot-out scored); Leahy (penalty shoot-out missed); Faiczak (penalty shoot-out missed); Woodcroft (penalty shoot-out missed); Sourisseau (penalty shoot-out missed); Leahy (penalty shoot-out missed)		(penalty shoot-out missed) Salima; (penalty shoot-out missed) Neha; (penalty shoot-out scored) Navneet; (penalty shoot-out scored) Sonika; (penalty shoot-out missed) Lalremsiami; (penalty shoot-out missed) Navneet; (penalty shoot-out missed) Sonika; (penalty shoot-out scored) Neha

13 July 2022 2022 World Cup	India	3–1	Japan	Terrassa, Spain
16:30	Navneet 30', 45'; Grace 38'	Report	Asai 20'	Stadium: Estadi Olímpic de Terrassa

29 July 2022 2022 Commonwealth Games	India	5–0	Ghana	Birmingham, England
14:00	Gurjit 3', 34'; Neha 28'; Sangita 36'; Salima 56'	Report		Stadium: University of Birmingham Hockey and Squash Centre

30 July 2022 2022 Commonwealth Games	India	3–1	Wales	Birmingham, England
19:00	Vandana 26', 48'; Gurjit 28'	Report	Hughes 45'	Stadium: University of Birmingham Hockey and Squash Centre

2 August 2022 2022 Commonwealth Games	India	1–3	England	Birmingham, England
14:00	Vandana 60'	Report	Ansley 3'; Howard 40'; Martin 52'	Stadium: University of Birmingham Hockey and Squash Centre

3 August 2022 2022 Commonwealth Games	Canada	2–3	India	Birmingham, England
11:00	Stairs 23'; Haughn 39'	Report	Salima 3'; Navneet Kaur 22'; Lalremsiami 51'	Stadium: University of Birmingham Hockey and Squash Centre

5 August 2022 2022 Commonwealth Games	Australia	1–1 (3–0 p)	India	Birmingham, England
20:15	Greiner 10'	Report	Vandana 49'	Stadium: University of Birmingham Hockey and Squash Centre
	Penalties
	Malone (penalty shoot-out scored); Nobbs (penalty shoot-out scored); Lawton (penalty shoot-out scored)		(penalty shoot-out missed) Lalremsiami; (penalty shoot-out missed) Neha; (penalty shoot-out missed) Navneet Kaur

7 August 2022 2022 Commonwealth Games	New Zealand	1–1 (1–2 p)	India	Birmingham, England
09:00	Merry 60'	Report	Salima 29'	Stadium: University of Birmingham Hockey and Squash Centre
	Penalties
	Hull (penalty shoot-out scored); Ralph (penalty shoot-out missed); Tynan (penalty shoot-out missed); Doar (penalty shoot-out missed); Shannon (penalty shoot-out missed)		(penalty shoot-out missed) Sangita; (penalty shoot-out scored) Sonika; (penalty shoot-out scored) Navneet; (penalty shoot-out missed) Neha

30 November 2022 India Tour of Spain	Spain	1–0	India	Valencia, Spain
		Report		Stadium: Estadio Beteró

2 December 2022 India Tour of Spain	Spain	1–1	India	Valencia, Spain
		Report		Stadium: Estadio Beteró

3 December 2022 India Tour of Spain	Spain	3–1	India	Valencia, Spain
		Report		Stadium: Estadio Beteró

8 December 2022 India Tour of Spain	Ireland	1–5	India	Valencia, Spain
		Report		Stadium: Estadio Beteró

11 December 2022 2022 Hockey Nations Cup	India	3–1	Chile	Valencia, Spain
15:15	Sangita 3'; Sonika 11'; Navneet 32'	Report	Villagran 44'	Stadium: Estadio Betero

12 December 2022 2022 Hockey Nations Cup	Japan	1–2	India	Valencia, Spain
15:15	Takashima 49'	Report	Salima 5'; Beauty 40'	Stadium: Estadio Betero

14 December 2022 2022 Hockey Nations Cup	India	2–0	South Africa	Valencia, Spain
15:15	Deep Grace 14'; Gurjit 59'	Report		Stadium: Estadio Betero

16 December 2022 2022 Hockey Nations Cup	India	1–1 (2–1 p)	Ireland	Valencia, Spain
15:45	Udita 45'	Report	Carroll 15'	Stadium: Estadio Betero
	Penalties
	Salima (penalty shoot-out missed); Lalremsiami (penalty shoot-out scored); Navneet (penalty shoot-out missed); Sonika (penalty shoot-out scored); Neha (penalty shoot-out missed)		(penalty shoot-out missed) Hamill; (penalty shoot-out missed) Curran; (penalty shoot-out scored) McLoughlin; (penalty shoot-out missed) Upton; (penalty shoot-out missed) Mullan

17 December 2022 2022 Hockey Nations Cup	Spain	0–1	India	Valencia, Spain
15:45		Report	Gurjit 6'	Stadium: Estadio Betero

== 2023 ==
16 January 2023 Test Series	South Africa	1–5	India	Cape Town, South Africa
18:00	Bobbs 44'	Report	Rani 12'; Monika 20'; Navneet 24'; Gurjit 25'; Sangita 30'	Stadium: Cape Town University

17 January 2023 Test Series	South Africa	0–7	India	Cape Town, South Africa
17:00		Report	Udita 9'; Vaishnavi 22'; Rani 22'; Sangita 25'; Navneet 26'; Vandana 27', 58'	Stadium: Cape Town University

19 January 2023 Test Series	South Africa	0–4	India	Cape Town, South Africa
17:00		Report	Rani 2'; Deep Grace 18'; Vandana 20'; Sangita 46'	Stadium: Cape Town University

22 January 2023 Test Series	South Africa	2–2	India	Cape Town, South Africa
15:00	Bobbs 8'; Lombard 35'	Report	Vaishnavi 29', 51'	Stadium: Cape Town University

23 January 2023 Test Series	Netherlands	3–1	India	Cape Town, South Africa
	Albers 29'; Jansen ?'; Moes ?'	Report	Dungdung 24'	Stadium: Cape Town University

26 January 2023 Test Series	Netherlands	3–1	India	Cape Town, South Africa
	Veen 4'; Welten 13', 29'	Report	Tete 50'	Stadium: Cape Town University

28 January 2023 Test Series	Netherlands	3–1	India	Cape Town, South Africa
	Dicke 25'; Jansen 37'; Plonissen 43'	Report	Vandana 35'	Stadium: Cape Town University

18 May 2023 Australia–India Test Series	Australia	4–2	India	Adelaide, Australia
18:45	Utri 21'; Fitzpatrick 27'; Arnott 32'; Schonell 45'	Report	Sangita 29'; Sharmila 40'	Stadium: MATE Stadium

20 May 2023 Australia–India Test Series	Australia	3–2	India	Adelaide, Australia
18:45	T. Stewart 12', 45'; Morgan 38'	Report	Sangita 13'; Gurjit 17'	Stadium: MATE Stadium

21 May 2023 Australia–India Test Series	Australia	1–1	India	Adelaide, Australia
18:15	Brooks 25'	Report	Grace 42'	Stadium: MATE Stadium

25 May 2023 Australia–India Test Series	Australia A	3–2	India	Adelaide, Australia
	Arnott 18'; Harris 20', 35'	Report	Tete 40'; Kumari 54'	Stadium: MATE Stadium

27 May 2023 Australia–India Test Series	Australia A	1–2	India	Adelaide, Australia
	Wilson 22'	Report	Navneet 10'; Ekka 25'	Stadium: MATE Stadium

16 July 2023 Test Series	India	2–3	China	Frankfurt, Germany
19:30	Navneet 24', 45'	Report	Chen. J 9'; Zhong 45'; Xu 51'

18 July 2023 Test Series	India	1–4	Germany	Frankfurt, Germany
14:30	Phalke 29'	Report	Lorenz 6', 59'; Fleschütz 14', 43'

19 July 2023 Test Series	India	0–2	Germany	Frankfurt, Germany
21:00		Report	Lorenz 52'; Stapenhorst 54'

26 July 2023 Torneo del Centenario 2023	India	1–1	England	Terrassa, Spain
11:00	Lalremsiami 41'	Report	Hunt 7'	Stadium: Estadi Martí Colomer

27 July 2023 Torneo del Centenario 2023	Spain	2–2	India	Terrassa, Spain
11:00	Giné 13'; Vidosa 26'	Report	Navneet 14', 29'	Stadium: Estadi Martí Colomer

29 July 2023 Torneo del Centenario 2023	England	0–3	India	Terrassa, Spain
11:00		Report	Lalremsiami 13', 17', 56'	Stadium: Estadi Martí Colomer

30 July 2023 Torneo del Centenario 2023	Spain	0–3	India	Terrassa, Spain
11:00		Report	Katariya 22'; Monika 22'; Udita 22'	Stadium: Estadi Martí Colomer

27 September 2023 2022 Asian Games PR	India	13–0	Singapore	Hangzhou, China
12:45	Udita 6'; Sushila 8'; Deepika 11'; Navneet 14', 14'; Grace 17'; Neha 19'; Sangita 23', 47', 53'; Salima 35'; Monika 52'; Vandana 56'	Report		Stadium: Gongshu Canal Sports Park Stadium

29 September 2023 2022 Asian Games PR	Malaysia	0–6	India	Hangzhou, China
18:30		Report	Monika 7'; Grace 8'; Navneet 25'; Vaishnavi 15'; Sangita 24'; Lalremsiami 50'	Stadium: Gongshu Canal Sports Park Stadium

1 October 2023 2022 Asian Games PR	South Korea	1–1	India	Hangzhou, China
16:00	Cho H. 12'	Report	Navneet 44'	Stadium: Gongshu Canal Sports Park Stadium

3 October 2023 2022 Asian Games PR	India	13–0	Hong Kong	Hangzhou, China
20:45	Vandana 2', 48'; Deepika 4', 54', 58'; Monika 7'; Grace 11', 42'; Sangita 27', 55'; Vaishnavi 34'; Navneet 58'	Report		Stadium: Gongshu Canal Sports Park Stadium

5 October 2023 2022 Asian Games SF	India	0–4	China	Hangzhou, China
16:00		Report	Zhong 25'; Zou 40'; Liang 55'; Gu 60'	Stadium: Gongshu Canal Sports Park Stadium

7 October 2023 2022 Asian Games 3P	India	2–1	Japan	Hangzhou, China
16:00	Deepika 5'; Chanu 50'	Report	Y. Nagai 30+'	Stadium: Gongshu Canal Sports Park Stadium

27 October 2023 2023 Asian Champions Trophy	India	7–1	Thailand	Ranchi, India
20:30	Monika 7'; Salima 15'; Sangita 29', 45', 45'; Deepika 40'; Lalremsiami 52'	Report	Samanso 22'	Stadium: Jaipal Singh Stadium

28 October 2023 2023 Asian Champions Trophy	India	5–0	Malaysia	Ranchi, India
20:30	Vandana 7', 21'; Sangita 28'; Lalremsiami 28'; Jyoti 38'	Report		Stadium: Jaipal Singh Stadium

30 October 2023 2023 Asian Champions Trophy	China	1−2	India	Ranchi, India
20:30	Zhong 41'	Report	Deepika 15'; Salima 26'	Stadium: Jaipal Singh Stadium

31 October 2023 2023 Asian Champions Trophy	Japan	1–2	India	Ranchi, India
20:30	Urata 37'	Report	Navneet 31'; Sangita 47'	Stadium: Jaipal Singh Stadium

2 November 2023 2023 Asian Champions Trophy	India	5–0	South Korea	Ranchi, India
20:30	Salima 6', 36'; Navneet 36'; Vandana 49'; Neha 60'	Report		Stadium: Jaipal Singh Stadium

4 November 2023 2023 Asian Champions Trophy Semi final	India	2–0	South Korea	Ranchi, India
20:30	Salima 11'; Vaishnavi 19'	Report		Stadium: Jaipal Singh Stadium

5 November 2023 2023 Asian Champions Trophy Final	Japan	0–4	India	Ranchi, India
20:30		Report	Sangita 17'; Neha 46'; Lalremsiami 57'; Vandana 60'	Stadium: Jaipal Singh Stadium

15 December 2023 5 Nations Tournament	Spain	3–2	India	Valencia, Spain
	Barrios 2'; Alvarez 30'; Strappato 53'	Report	Gurjit 13'; Sangita 14'

16 December 2023 5 Nations Tournament	Belgium	2–1	India	Valencia, Spain
	Ballenghien 22'; Versavel 37'	Report	Phalke 56'

19 December 2023 5 Nations Tournament	Germany	3–1	India	Valencia, Spain
	Lorenz 11'; Granitzki 23'; Stapenhorst 52'	Report	Pradhan 34'

21 December 2023 5 Nations Tournament	India	2–1	Ireland	Valencia, Spain
20:00	Deepika 4'; Sangita 22'	Report	Mullan 12'

== 2024 ==
13 January 2024 2024 Olympic Qualifiers GS	India	0–1	United States	Ranchi, India
19:30		Report	Tamer 16'	Stadium: Jaipal Singh Stadium

14 January 2024 2024 Olympic Qualifiers GS	New Zealand	1–3	India	Ranchi, India
19:30	Hull 9'	Report	Sangita 1'; Udita 12'; Beauty 14'	Stadium: Jaipal Singh Stadium

16 January 2024 2024 Olympic Qualifiers GS	India	5–1	Italy	Ranchi, India
19:30	Udita 1', 56'; Deepika 41'; Salima 45'; Navneet 53'	Report	Machín 60+'	Stadium: Jaipal Singh Stadium

18 January 2024 2024 Olympic Qualifiers SF	Germany	2–2 (4–3 p)	India	Ranchi, India
19:30	Stapenhorst 27', 57'	Report	Deepika 15'; Ishika 59'	Stadium: Jaipal Singh Stadium
	Penalties
	Weidemann (penalty shoot-out missed); Zimmermann (penalty shoot-out scored); Schröder (penalty shoot-out missed); Lorenz (penalty shoot-out scored); Nolte (penalty shoot-out scored); Zimmermann (penalty shoot-out missed); Nolte (penalty shoot-out scored)		(penalty shoot-out scored) Sangita; (penalty shoot-out scored) Sonika; (penalty shoot-out missed) Navneet; (penalty shoot-out missed) Neha; (penalty shoot-out scored) Lalremsiami; (penalty shoot-out missed) Sangita; (penalty shoot-out missed) Sonika

19 January 2024 2024 Olympic Qualifiers 3P	India	0–1	Japan	Ranchi, India
16:30		Report	Urata 6'	Stadium: Jaipal Singh Stadium

3 February 2024 2023–24 FIH Pro League	China	2–1	India	Bhubaneswar, India
19:30	Dan 40'; Gu B. 52'	Report	Vandana 15'	Stadium: Kalinga Stadium

4 February 2024 2023–24 FIH Pro League	India	1–3	Netherlands	Bhubaneswar, India
19:30	Navneet 9'	Report	Jansen 3', 34'; Van Der Elst 21'	Stadium: Kalinga Stadium

7 February 2024 2023–24 FIH Pro League	India	0–3	Australia	Bhubaneswar, India
19:30		Report	G. Stewart 19'; T. Stewart 23'; Nobbs 55'	Stadium: Kalinga Stadium

9 February 2024 2023–24 FIH Pro League	India	3–1	United States	Bhubaneswar, India
19:30	Vandana 9'; Deepika 26'; Salima 56'	Report	Caarls 42'	Stadium: Kalinga Stadium

12 February 2024 2023–24 FIH Pro League	China	2–1	India	Rourkela, India
19:30	Gu B. 14', 53'	Report	Sangita 7'	Stadium: Birsa Munda International Hockey Stadium

14 February 2024 2023–24 FIH Pro League	Netherlands	1–0	India	Rourkela, India
19:30	Albers 27'	Report		Stadium: Birsa Munda International Hockey Stadium

17 February 2024 2023–24 FIH Pro League	Australia	0–1	India	Rourkela, India
19:30		Report	Vandana 34'	Stadium: Birsa Munda International Hockey Stadium

18 February 2024 2023–24 FIH Pro League	United States	1–1 (1–2 p)	India	Rourkela, India
19:30	Sessa 45'	Report	Deepika 19'	Stadium: Birsa Munda International Hockey Stadium
	Penalties
	Crouse (penalty shoot-out scored); Deepika (penalty shoot-out missed); Tamer (penalty shoot-out missed); Zimmer (penalty shoot-out missed); Caarls (penalty shoot-out missed)		(penalty shoot-out missed) Kumari; (penalty shoot-out scored) Deepika; (penalty shoot-out missed) Mumtaz; (penalty shoot-out missed) Sonika; (penalty shoot-out scored) Lalremsiami

22 May 2024 2023–24 FIH Pro League	India	0–5	Argentina	Antwerp, Belgium
15:45		Report	Gorzelany 13'; Raposo 24'; Miranda 41'; Jankunas 53', 59'	Stadium: Wilrijkse Plein Antwerp

23 May 2024 2023–24 FIH Pro League	Belgium	2–0	India	Antwerp, Belgium
22:15	'T Serstevens 34'; Dewaet 36'	Report		Stadium: Wilrijkse Plein Antwerp

25 May 2024 2023–24 FIH Pro League	Belgium	2–1	India	Antwerp, Belgium
17:30	Ballenghien 15'; Blockmans 20'	Report	Sangita 34'	Stadium: Wilrijkse Plein Antwerp

26 May 2024 2023–24 FIH Pro League	Argentina	3–0	India	Antwerp, Belgium
15:15	Di Santo 1'; Campoy 39'; Granatto 47'	Report		Stadium: Wilrijkse Plein Antwerp

1 June 2024 2023–24 FIH Pro League	Germany	3–1	India	London, England
21:45	Stapenhorst 13'; Zimmermann 24'; Lorenz 37'	Report	Deepika 23'	Stadium: Lee Valley Hockey and Tennis Centre

2 June 2024 2023–24 FIH Pro League	Great Britain	3–2	India	London, England
19:00	Watson 5', 7'; Petter 57'	Report	Navneet 34'; Sharmila 56'	Stadium: Lee Valley Hockey and Tennis Centre

8 June 2024 2023–24 FIH Pro League	India	2–4	Germany	London, England
14:30	Sunelita 9'; Deepika 15'	Report	Huse 23', 32'; Kurz 51'; Bleuel 55'	Stadium: Lee Valley Hockey and Tennis Centre

9 June 2024 2023–24 FIH Pro League	Great Britain	3–2	India	London, England
16:45	Watson 3'; Balsdon 56', 58'	Report	Lalremsiami 14'; Navneet 23'	Stadium: Lee Valley Hockey and Tennis Centre

11 November 2024 2024 Asian Champions Trophy GS	India	4–0	Malaysia	Rajgir, India
16:45	Sangita 8', 55'; Preeti 43'; Udita 44'	Report		Stadium: Rajgir Hockey Stadium

12 November 2024 2024 Asian Champions Trophy GS	India	3–2	South Korea	Rajgir, India
16:45	Sangita 3'; Deepika 20', 57'	Report	Lee Yu-r. 34'; Cheon 38'	Stadium: Rajgir Hockey Stadium

14 November 2024 2024 Asian Champions Trophy GS	Thailand	0–13	India	Rajgir, India
16:45		Report	Deepika 3', 19', 43', 45', 45'; Preeti 9', 40'; Lalremsiami 12', 56'; Beauty 30', 53'; Ishika 55'; Sharmila 58'	Stadium: Rajgir Hockey Stadium

16 November 2024 2024 Asian Champions Trophy GS	India	3–0	China	Rajgir, India
16:45	Sangita 32'; Salima 37'; Deepika 60'	Report		Stadium: Rajgir Hockey Stadium

17 November 2024 2024 Asian Champions Trophy GS	Japan	0–3	India	Rajgir, India
16:45		Report	Navneet 37'; Deepika 47', 48'	Stadium: Rajgir Hockey Stadium

19 November 2024 2024 Asian Champions Trophy SF	India	2–0	Japan	Rajgir, India
16:45	Navneet 48'; Lalremsiami 56'	Report		Stadium: Rajgir Hockey Stadium

20 November 2024 2024 Asian Champions Trophy F	China	0–1	India	Rajgir, India
16:45		Report	Deepika 31'	Stadium: Rajgir Hockey Stadium

== See also ==
- India men's national field hockey team results (2021–2024)
