= Shin Hye-jeong (field hockey) =

South Korean field hockey player

Personal information
- Born: 6 July 1992 (age 34)
- Height: 1.56 m (5 ft 1 in)
- Weight: 58 kg (128 lb)

Sport
- Sport: Field hockey
National team
Years	Team	Caps	Goals
2014–	South Korea	40	-
Medal record
Women's field hockey
Representing South Korea
Asian Games
Gold medal – first place	2014 Incheon	Team
Asia Cup
Silver medal – second place	2022 Muscat
Bronze medal – third place	2017 Gifu
Asian Champions Trophy
Gold medal – first place	2018 Donghae
Silver medal – second place	2021 Donghae

Shin Hye-jeong (born 6 July 1992) is a South Korean field hockey player for the South Korean national team.

She participated at the 2018 Women's Hockey World Cup.

She won a gold medal as a member of the South Korean team at 2014 Asian Games.
