= Lee Yu-ri (field hockey) =

South Korean field hockey player

Personal information
- Born: 6 September 1994 (age 31)
- Height: 1.65 m (5 ft 5 in)
- Weight: 57 kg (126 lb)

Sport
- Sport: Field hockey
National team
Years	Team	Caps	Goals
–	South Korea	60	-
Medal record
Women's field hockey
Representing South Korea
Asian Games
Silver medal – second place	2022 Hangzhou	Team
Asia Cup
Silver medal – second place	2022 Muscat
Bronze medal – third place	2017 Gifu
Asian Champions Trophy
Gold medal – first place	2018 Donghae
Silver medal – second place	2021 Donghae

Lee Yu-ri (Korean: 이유리, born 6 September 1994) is a South Korean field hockey player for the South Korean national team.

She participated at the 2018 Women's Hockey World Cup.
