= Miki Kozuka =

Japanese field hockey player

Personal information
- Born: 13 January 1996 (age 30)

Sport
- Sport: Field hockey
National team
Years	Team	Caps	Goals
–	Japan	43	-
Medal record
Asia Cup
Gold medal – first place	2022 Muscat
Asian Champions Trophy
Gold medal – first place	2021 Donghae
Bronze medal – third place	2016 Singapore

Miki Kozuka (born 13 January 1996) is a Japanese field hockey player for the Japanese national team.

She participated at the 2018 Women's Hockey World Cup.
