= Choi Su-ji =

South Korean field hockey player

Personal information
- Born: 14 June 1993 (age 33)
- Height: 1.61 m (5 ft 3 in)
- Weight: 59 kg (130 lb)

Sport
- Sport: Field hockey
National team
Years	Team	Caps	Goals
2018–	South Korea	13	-
Medal record
Women's field hockey
Representing South Korea
Asian Games
Silver medal – second place	2022 Hangzhou	Team
Asia Cup
Silver medal – second place	2022 Muscat
Asian Champions Trophy
Silver medal – second place	2021 Donghae

Choi Su-ji (born 14 June 1993) is a South Korean field hockey player for the South Korean national team.

She participated at the 2018 Women's Hockey World Cup.
