= Baek Ee-seul =

South Korean field hockey player

Medal record

Women's field hockey

Representing South Korea

Asian Games
Silver medal – second place	2022 Hangzhou	Team

Asia Cup
Silver medal – second place	2022 Muscat	

Asian Champions Trophy
Silver medal – second place	2021 Donghae	

- Baek Ee-seul
- Hangul: 백이슬
- RR: Baek Iseul
- MR: Paek Isŭl

Baek Ee-seul (Korean: 백이슬; born October 4, 1994) is a South Korean field hockey player. She competed for the South Korea women's national field hockey team at the 2016 Summer Olympics.
