= Sakurako Omoto =

Japanese field hockey player

Personal information
- Born: 19 March 1998 (age 28)

Sport
- Sport: Field hockey
- Position: Midfielder
- Club: Coca-Cola Red Sparks
National team
Years	Team	Caps	Goals
–	Japan		-
Medal record
Asia Cup
Gold medal – first place	2022 Muscat
Asian Champions Trophy
Gold medal – first place	2021 Donghae
Girls' Asia Cup
Silver medal – second place	2016 Bangkok

Sakurako Omoto (尾本桜子, Omoto Sakurako, is a Japanese field hockey player for the Japanese national team.
