= Hazuki Yuda =

Japanese field hockey player (born 1989)

Medal record

Women's field hockey

Representing Japan

Asian Champions Trophy
Bronze medal – third place	2016 Singapore	

Hazuki Yuda (湯田 葉月, Yuda Hazuki; born July 11, 1989) is a Japanese field hockey player. She competed for the Japan women's national field hockey team at the 2016 Summer Olympics.
