= Rajwinder Kaur =

Rajwinder Kaur may refer to:

- Rajwinder Kaur (field hockey, born 1984)
- Rajwinder Kaur (field hockey, born 1998)
- Rajwinder Kaur (judoka)
- Rajwinder Kaur (sprinter) (born 1980), Indian sprinter
