= Yu Asai =

Japanese field hockey player

Personal information
- Born: 8 January 1996 (age 30) Osaka, Japan
- Height: 1.72 m (5 ft 8 in)
- Weight: 63 kg (139 lb)

Sport
- Sport: Field hockey
- Position: Defender
- Club: Coca-Cola Red Sparks
National team
| Years | Team | Caps | Goals |
| – | Japan | 55 | - |
Medal record
Asia Cup
| Gold medal – first place | 2022 Muscat |
Asian Champions Trophy
| Gold medal – first place | 2021 Donghae |
| Bronze medal – third place | 2016 Singapore |

Yu Asai (浅井 悠由, Asai Yū, born 8 January 1996) is a Japanese field hockey player for the Japanese national team.

She participated at the 2018 Women's Hockey World Cup.
