= 2016 Women's Asian Champions Trophy =

Hockey competition in Singapore

2016 Asian Women's Hockey Champions
Tournament details
- Host country: Singapore
- Dates: 29 October – 5 November
- Teams: 5 (from 1 confederation)
- Venue: Sengkang Hockey Stadium

Final positions
- Champions: India (1st title)
- Runner-up: China
- Third place: Japan

Tournament statistics
- Matches played: 12
- Goals scored: 42 (3.5 per match)
- Top scorer: (India) Deepika Thakur (4 goals)

The 2016 Women's Asian Champions Trophy was the fourth edition of the Women's Asian Champions Trophy. The tournament was held in Singapore. The top five Asian teams (China, India, Japan, South Korea and Malaysia) participated in the tournament which involved round-robin league among all teams followed by play-offs for final positions.

Qnet was the official sponsor.

== Umpires ==
Seven umpires officiated at the tournament:

Neutral Umpires

- Ornpimol Kittiteerasopon (THA)
- Toh Li Min (SIN)

National Umpires

- Nirmala Dagar (IND)
- Kim Yoon Sung (KOR)
- Xiaoying Liu (CHN)
- Junko Wagatsuma (JPN)

Umpires

- Ayu Zainuddin (MAS)

== Results ==
All times are Singapore Standard Time (UTC+8)

=== Round robin ===
Pos	Team	Pld	W	D	L	GF	GA	GD	Pts	Qualification
1	China	4	3	0	1	8	5	+3	9	Final
2	India	4	2	1	1	8	6	+2	7	Final
3	Japan	4	2	1	1	7	6	+1	7	Third place game
4	South Korea	4	1	0	3	8	9	−1	3	Third place game
5	Malaysia	4	1	0	3	5	10	−5	3	

Source: Asian Champions Trophy

29 October 2016
16:00

South Korea	5–2	Malaysia
Cho Hye-jin 3', 52'; Cheon Seul-ki 4'; Park Mi-yeon 6'; Baek Ee-seul 32'	Report	Saiuti 23'; Rashid 26'

Umpires:
Junko Wagatsuma (JPN)
Ornpimol Kittiteerasopon (THA)

29 October 2016
18:00

Japan	2–2	India
Kozuka 47'; Mano 50'	Report	Deepika 36'; Ekka 42'

Umpires:
Xiaoying Liu (CHN)
Ayu Zainuddin (MAS)

30 October 2016
16:00

China	3–1	Malaysia
Zixia 45+'; Zhong J. 57', 59'	Report	Shabuddin 7'

Umpires:
Kim Yoon-Seon (KOR)
Nirmla Dagar (IND)

30 October 2016
18:00

South Korea	1–2	India
Baek Ee-seul 28'	Report	Rani 47'; Deepika 54'

Umpires:
Xiaoying Liu (CHN)
Li Min Toh (SGP)

1 November 2016
18:00

India	2–0	Malaysia
Poonam 7'; Deepika 45'	Report

Umpires:
Junko Wagatsuma (JPN)
Li Min Toh (SGP)

1 November 2016
20:00

Japan	2–0	China
H. Nagai 20'; Yuda 32'	Report

Umpires:
Ornpimol Kittiteerasopon (THA)
Kim Yoon-Seon (KOR)

2 November 2016
18:00

Malaysia	2–0	Japan
Ruhani 38'; Rashid 39'	Report

Umpires:
Nirmla Dagar (IND)
Xiaoying Liu (CHN)

2 November 2016
20:00

South Korea	0–2	China
	Report	Zhang J. 29', 40'

Umpires:
Junko Wagatsuma (JPN)
Ayu Zainuddin (MAS)

4 November 2016
17:00

Japan	3–2	South Korea
Mano 15'; Nishimura 38'; Y. Nagai 50'	Report	Cheon Seul-ki 20'; Park Mi-yeon 44'

Umpires:
Ornpimol Kittiteerasopon (THA)
Nirmla Dagar (IND)

4 November 2016
19:00

China	3–2	India
Yang 25'; Guo 51'; Zixia 58'	Report	Poonam 52'; Katariya 55'

Umpires:
Kim Yoon-Seon (KOR)
Ayu Zainuddin (MAS)

=== Classification ===
==== Third place game ====
5 November 2016
17:00

Japan	2–1	South Korea
Shimizu 54'; Sakaguchi 60'	Report	Cho Yun-kyoung 37'

Umpires:
Xiaoying Liu (CHN)
Ornpimol Kittiteerasopon (THA)

==== Final ====
5 November 2016
19:30

China	1–2	India
Zhong M. 44'	Report	Ekka 13'; Deepika 60'

Umpires:
Junko Wagatsuma (JPN)
Kim Yoon-seon (KOR)

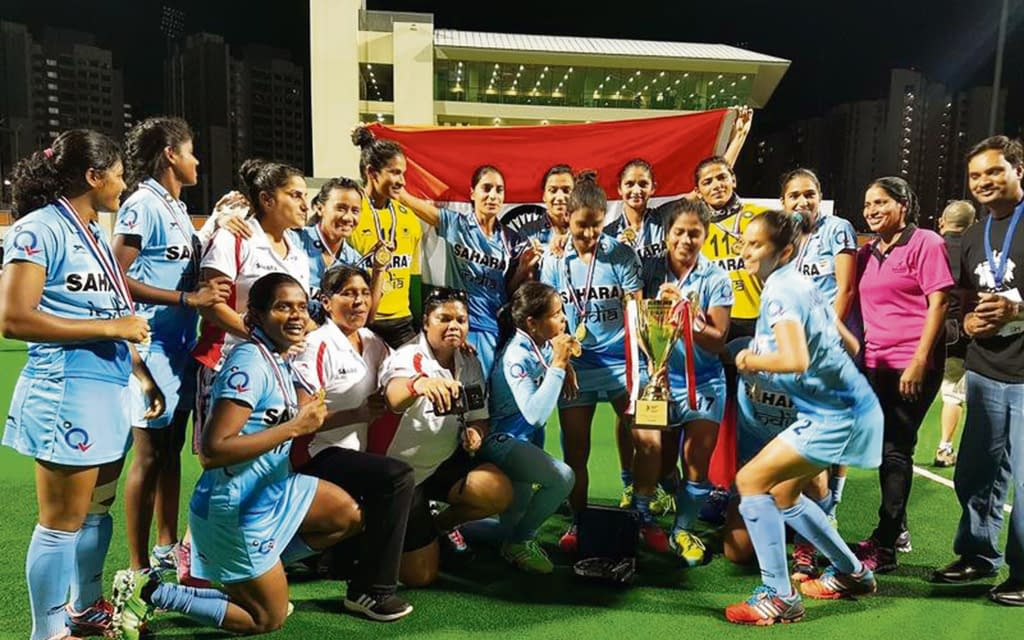
Indian women's hockey team after winning the Champions Trophy

== Final standings ==
1. India
2. China
3. Japan
4. South Korea
5. Malaysia

== See also ==
- 2016 Men's Asian Champions Trophy
