= Saki Tanaka (field hockey) =

Japanese field hockey player

Personal information
- Born: 18 September 1998 (age 27) Iwate Prefecture, Japan

Sport
- Sport: Field hockey
- Position: Midfield
- Club: GlaxoSmithKline Orange United
National team
Years	Team	Caps	Goals
2022–	Japan	18	(2)
Medal record
Women's field hockey
Representing Japan
Asian Champions Trophy
Bronze medal – third place	2024 Rajgir
Asian Cup
Gold medal – first place	2022 Muscat
Bronze medal – third place	2025 Hangzhou
FIH Nations Cup
Bronze medal – third place	2022 Valencia

Saki Tanaka (田中 彩樹, born 18 September 1998) is a field hockey player from Japan.

== Personal life ==
Saki Tanaka was born in the Iwate Prefecture.

== Career ==
=== Domestic league ===
In the Japanese national league, Tanaka represents GlaxoSmithKline Orange United.

=== Cherry Blossoms ===
Tanka made her senior international debut in 2022. She represented the team at the Asian Cup in Muscat, where she won a gold medal. She went on to win a second medal later in the year, taking home bronze at the FIH Nations Cup in Valencia.

She didn't represent the team again until 2024. She made appearances at the International Festival of Hockey in Perth and the 2023–24 FIH Nations Cup in Terrassa.

==== International goals ====
Goal	Date	Location	Opponent	Score	Result	Competition	Ref.
1	23 January 2022	Sultan Qaboos Sports Complex, Muscat, Oman	India	2–0	2–0	2022 Asian Cup	
2	3 June 2024	Estadi Martí Colomer, Terrassa, Spain	Canada	3–0	3–0	2023–24 FIH Nations Cup	
