= Guo Qiu =

Chinese field hockey player

Personal information
- Born: 25 November 1995 (age 30)

Sport
- Sport: Field hockey
National team
Years	Team	Caps	Goals
–	China	39	-
Medal record
Women's field hockey
Representing China
Asian Champions Trophy
Silver medal – second place	2016 Singapore

Guo Qiu (born 25 November 1995) is a Chinese field hockey player for the Chinese national team.

She participated at the 2018 Women's Hockey World Cup.
