= Kaho Tanaka =

Japanese field hockey player

Personal information
- Born: 25 October 1997 (age 29)

Sport
- Sport: Field hockey
National team
Years	Team	Caps	Goals
–	Japan		-
Medal record
Asia Cup
Gold medal – first place	2022 Muscat
Asian Champions Trophy
Gold medal – first place	2021 Donghae
Girls' Asia Cup
Silver medal – second place	2016 Bangkok

Kaho Tanaka is a Japanese field hockey player for the Japanese national team, who participated in the 2020 Summer Olympics.

Her goals, especially in the finals, were crucial in Japan winning the 2021 Women’s Asian Champions Trophy and the 2022 Women's Hockey Asia Cup.
