= Kanon Mori =

Japanese field hockey player

Personal information
- Born: 1 May 1996 (age 30) Shiga Prefecture, Japan

Sport
- Sport: Field hockey
- Position: Forward
- Club: Coca-Cola Red Sparks
National team
| Years | Team | Caps | Goals |
| – | Japan | | - |
Medal record
Asia Cup
| Gold medal – first place | 2022 Muscat |
Asian Champions Trophy
| Gold medal – first place | 2021 Donghae |

Kanon Mori (森 花音, Mori Kanon; born 1 May 1996) is a Japanese field hockey player for the Japanese national team.
