= Kang Ji-na =

South Korean field hockey player (born 1993)

Personal information
- Born: 10 January 1993 (age 33) South Korea
- Height: 158 cm (5 ft 2 in)

Sport
- Sport: Field hockey
- Position: Forward
- Club: Asan City Hall
National team
Years	Team	Caps	Goals
2010	South Korea U–18	6	(2)
2013	South Korea U–21	6	(3)
2019–	South Korea	45	(19)
Medal record
Women's field hockey
Representing South Korea
Asian Games
Silver medal – second place	2022 Hangzhou	Team
Asian Cup
Silver medal – second place	2022 Muscat	Team
FIH Hockey Series
Gold medal – first place	2018–19 Banbridge	Team
Asian Champions Trophy
Silver medal – second place	2021 Donghae	Team

Kang Ji-na (Korean: 강진아, born 10 January 1993) is a field hockey player from South Korea.

== Career ==
=== Under–18 ===
In 2010, Kang was captain of the South Korean U–18 team at the Youth Olympic Games in Singapore. At the tournament, the team finished in fourth place.

=== Under–21 ===
Kang also represented South Korea at Under–21 level. She was a member of the national team at the 2013 FIH Junior World Cup in Mönchengladbach.

=== Senior national team ===
Kang did not make her senior international debut until 2019, making her first appearance in a test series against Chile in Asan.

Since her debut Kang has medalled with the team on numerous occasions. She won gold at the 2018–19 FIH Series Finals in Banbridge, as well as silver medals at the 2022 Asian Games in Hangzhou, the 2022 Asian Cup in Muscat and the 2021 Asian Champions Trophy in Donghae City.

She has been named in the squad for the 2024 FIH Olympic Qualifiers in Valencia.
