= Seo Jung-eun =

South Korean field hockey player (born 1991)

Personal information
- Born: 26 December 1991 (age 34)
- Height: 167 cm (5 ft 6 in)

Korean name
- Hangul: 서정은
- RR: Seo Jeongeun
- MR: Sŏ Chŏngŭn
Medal record
Women's field hockey
Representing South Korea
Asian Games
Gold medal – first place	2014 Incheon	Team
Silver medal – second place	2022 Hangzhou	Team
Asia Cup
Silver medal – second place	2022 Muscat
Bronze medal – third place	2017 Gifu
Asian Champions Trophy
Gold medal – first place	2018 Donghae

Seo Jung-eun (born 26 December 1991) is a South Korean field hockey player. She competed for the South Korea women's national field hockey team at the 2016 Summer Olympics.

She won a gold medal as a member of the South Korean team at 2014 Asian Games.
