= Wang Shumin =

Chinese field hockey player

Personal information
- Born: 12 September 1993 (age 33)

Sport
- Sport: Field hockey
National team
Years	Team	Caps	Goals
–	China	23	-
Medal record
Women's field hockey
Representing China
Asian Champions Trophy
Bronze medal – third place	2018 Donghae
Girls' Asia Cup
Silver medal – second place	2011 Bangkok

Wang Shumin (born 12 September 1993) is a Chinese field hockey player for the Chinese national team.

She participated at the 2018 Women's Hockey World Cup.
