= Sharmila Godara =

Indian field hockey player

Personal information
- Full name: Sharmila Devi Godara
- Born: 10 October 2001 (age 24) Hisar, Haryana, India

Sport
- Sport: Field hockey
- Position: Forward
Senior career
Years	Team	Caps	Goals
–	Hockey Haryana	-	-
–	Indian Oil Corporation Ltd	-	-
2025–	Soorma Hockey Club	-	-
National team
Years	Team	Caps	Goals
2019–	India	89	(10)
Medal record
Women's field hockey
Representing India
Commonwealth Games
Bronze medal – third place	2022 Birmingham	Team
Asia Cup
Silver medal – second place	2025 Hangzhou
Bronze medal – third place	2022 Muscat
Asian Champions Trophy
Gold medal – first place	2024 Rajgir

Sharmila Godara, also known as Sharmila Devi, is an Indian field hockey player from Haryana. She plays as forward for the Soorma Hockey Club and Hockey Haryana.

== Early life ==
Godara is from Hisar, Haryana. She is employed with the Indian Oil Corporation Limited and plays for their hockey team.

== Career ==
She made her international debut against the USA in the 2019 Women's FIH Olympic Qualifiers, where she scored a goal.

In 2021, she was selected as part of the Indian squad which would participate in the Tokyo Olympics.
