= Yuri Nagai =

Japanese field hockey player

Personal information
- Born: 26 May 1992 (age 34) Kakamigahara, Japan
- Height: 1.55 m (5 ft 1 in)
- Weight: 53 kg (117 lb)

Sport
- Sport: Field hockey
National team
Years	Team	Caps	Goals
2010–	Japan	150	-
Medal record
Women's field hockey
Representing Japan
Asian Games
Gold medal – first place	2018 Jakarta	Team
Asia Cup
Gold medal – first place	2013 Kuala Lumpur
Gold medal – first place	2022 Muscat
Asian Champions Trophy
Gold medal – first place	2013 Kakamigahara
Gold medal – first place	2021 Donghae
Bronze medal – third place	2016 Singapore

Yuri Nagai (永井 友理, Nagai Yuri; born 26 May 1992) is a Japanese field hockey player. She competed for the Japan women's national field hockey team at the 2016 Summer Olympics.

She announced her retirement on 22 December 2024.
