= Amiru Shimada =

Japanese field hockey player

Personal information
- Born: 23 June 1998 (age 28) Shiga Prefecture, Japan
- Height: 166 cm (5 ft 5 in)
- Weight: 53 kg (117 lb)

Sport
- Sport: Field hockey
- Position: Midfield
Senior career
Years	Team	Caps	Goals
–	Nanto Bank Shooting Stars	-	-
National team
Years	Team	Caps	Goals
2019–	Japan	34	(4)
Medal record
Women's field hockey
Representing Japan
Asian Cup
Gold medal – first place	2022 Muscat
Bronze medal – third place	2025 Hangzhou
Asian Champions Trophy
Gold medal – first place	2021 Donghae
Silver medal – second place	2023 Ranchi
FIH Nations Cup
Bronze medal – third place	2022 Valencia
Girls' Asia Cup
Silver medal – second place	2016 Bangkok

Amiru Shimada (島田 あみる, born 23 June 1998) is a Japanese field hockey player.

== Early life ==
Amiru Shimada was born 23 June 1998 in the Shiga Prefecture.

== Career ==
=== Domestic league ===
In the Japanese national league, Shimada represents the Nanto Bank Shooting Stars.

=== Cherry Blossoms ===
Shimada made her senior international debut in 2019 during a test series against Chile in Ibaraki.

Throughout her career, Shimada has medalled with the national team numerous times. She won gold at the 2022 Asian Cup in Muscat and the 2021 Asian Champions Trophy in Donghae City, silver at the 2023 Asian Champions Trophy in Ranchi and bronze at the 2022 FIH Nations Cup in Valencia.

She was named in the squad for the 2024 FIH Olympic Qualifiers in Ranchi.
