= Cheon Eun-bi =

South Korean field hockey player

Medal record

Women's field hockey

Representing South Korea

Asian Games
Gold medal – first place	2014 Incheon	Team
Silver medal – second place	2022 Hangzhou	Team

Asia Cup
Silver medal – second place	2013 Kuala Lumpur	
Silver medal – second place	2022 Muscat	

Asian Champions Trophy
Gold medal – first place	2011 Ordos	
Silver medal – second place	2021 Donghae	

Cheon Eun-bi (Korean: 천은비, born 7 February 1992) is a South Korean field hockey player. She was part of the Korea women's national field hockey team in the women's hockey tournament at the 2012 and 2016 Summer Olympics.

She won a gold medal as a member of the South Korean team at the 2014 Asian Games. She was also a scorer in the 2022 Asian Games final that South Korea lost to India.
