= Kim Seo-na =

South Korean field hockey player

Personal information
- Born: 23 September 2000 (age 25) South Korea

Sport
- Sport: Field hockey
- Position: Forward
National team
Years	Team	Caps	Goals
2019–	South Korea	23	(4)
2022	South Korea U–21	6	(0)
Medal record
Women's field hockey
Representing South Korea
Asian Cup
Silver medal – second place	2022 Muscat	Team
FIH Hockey Series
Gold medal – first place	2018–19 Banbridge	Team

Kim Seo-na (born 23 September 2000) is a field hockey player from South Korea.

== Career ==
=== Under–21 ===
In 2022, Kim Seo-na captained the South Korea U–21 team at the FIH Junior World Cup in Potchefstroom.

=== National team ===
Seo-na made her debut for the national team in 2019 during a test series against Chile in Seoul.

In 2022, she was a member of the silver medal-winning team at the Asian Cup in Muscat. Later that year she was a member of the team at the FIH World Cup in Amsterdam and Terrassa.

=== International goals ===
Goal	Date	Location	Opponent	Score	Result	Competition	Ref.
1	9 April 2019	Jinchun Athletic Centre, Seoul, South Korea	Chile	1–0	1–1	Test Match	
2	9 December 2021	Donghae City Sunrise Stadium, Donghae, South Korea	China	1–0	3–2	2021 Asian Champions Trophy	
3	24 January 2022	Sultan Qaboos Sports Complex, Muscat, Oman	Thailand	4–0	6–0	2022 Asian Cup	
4	3 July 2022	Estadi Olímpic de Terrassa, Terrassa, Spain	Canada	2–1	3–2	2022 FIH World Cup	
