= Deep Grace Ekka =

Indian field hockey player (born 1994)

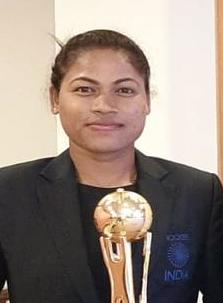

Personal information
- Born: 3 June 1994 (age 32) Lulkidhi, Sundergarh, Odisha, India
- Height: 1.58 m (5 ft 2 in)
- Weight: 63 kg (139 lb)

Sport
- Sport: Field hockey
- Position: Defender
- Club: Railways
Senior career
Years	Team	Caps	Goals
–	Hockey Odisha	-	-
–	Railways	-	-
2025–	Odisha Warriors	-	-
National team
Years	Team	Caps	Goals
2011–	India U18		-
2013–2015	India U21	16	(3)
2011–2023	India	268	(24)
Medal record
Women's field hockey
Representing India
Asian Games
Silver medal – second place	2018 Jakarta	Team
Bronze medal – third place	2014 Incheon	Team
Bronze medal – third place	2022 Hangzhou	Team
Commonwealth Games
Bronze medal – third place	2022 Birmingham	Team
Asia Cup
Gold medal – first place	2017 Gifu
Bronze medal – third place	2013 Kuala Lumpur
Bronze medal – third place	2022 Muscat
Asian Champions Trophy
Gold medal – first place	2016 Singapore
Gold medal – first place	2023 Ranchi
Silver medal – second place	2013 Kakamigahara
Silver medal – second place	2018 Donghae
FIH Nations Cup
Gold medal – first place	2022 Spain
Junior World Cup
Bronze medal – third place	2013 Mönchengladbach
Junior Asia Cup
Silver medal – second place	2012 Bangkok
Girls' Asia Cup
Bronze medal – third place	2011 Bangkok

Deep Grace Ekka (born 3 June 1994) is an Indian former field hockey player, who represented the India national field hockey team. She was honoured with Arjuna Award in 2022.

== Early life ==
Deep Grace Ekka was born on 3 June 1994 in a small village called Lulkidhi in the Sundergarh district of Odisha. She is the daughter of Charles and Jayamani Ekka.

She started playing hockey in school and was coached by Tej Kumar Xess (2005–06). During a round of hockey selections at her school, she was selected to join the SAI-SAG centre of the Sports Authority of India in September 2007 and started playing at state level at the age of 13. She began to be coached by Lucela Ekka and Saroj Mohanty. At the age of 16, she played at the senior nationals in Sonepat.

In 2011, she played at the National Games in Ranchi. She was also selected for the Junior National Camp and travelled to Bangkok for the 2011 Youth Asia Cup. She represented Indian girls' team that won bronze in that tournament.

She started as a defender, but her desire was to become a goalkeeper as her brother and she used to play sometimes but her uncle, who was her coach, did not allow her to pursue or practise as a goalkeeper, so having no choice she became a defender.

== Career ==
- She has 150 international caps and has scored 3 international goals.

=== International ===
- She doubled up drag flicker defending and winning performances at the 9th women Asia cup in Japan.
- She completed 150 international caps for India in the match against Malaysia at the 2018 Commonwealth Games.
- Made her international debut in the Four-Nation Tournament in Argentina in 2011 in which India won Bronze medal.
- Helped India win the bronze medal in the Girls' Asia Cup at Bangkok, Thailand in 2011.
- Represented Indian senior team in the FIH World League (Round 2) held at New Delhi from 18 to 24 February 2013.
- She was a part of the Indian team that made history by winning the bronze medal for the first time in 2013 Women's Hockey Junior World Cup at Monchengladbach in Germany on 4 July 2013.
- She was part of the Indian team that won the bronze medal in the 2013 Women's Hockey Asia Cup.
- She was part of the senior Indian team that won the silver medal in the 2013 Women's Asian Champions Trophy.
- She was a member of the Indian team that won the women's hockey test series 6–0 against Malaysia held at Kualalumpur from 9 to 17 June 2014.
- She was part of the Indian women team that finished fifth in the 20th Commonwealth Games, held in Glasgow from 23 July to 3 August 2014.
- She was a member of the Indian women hockey team that won the bronze medal in the 17th Asian Games at Incheon (South Korea) on 1 October 2014.
- She was a member of the Indian women team that finished seventh in the 2015 Hawke's Bay Cup, held at Hastings in New Zealand from 11 to 19 April 2015.
- She was part of the Indian team that won the FIH World League Round 2 in New Delhi in 2015.
- She was a member of Indian women hockey team that won five matches, drew one and lost two on its South Africa tour, which took place from 20 February to 1 March 2016.
- She was a member of the India team that finished sixth in the 2016 Hawke's Bay Cup, held at Hastings in New Zealand from 2 to 10 April 2016.
- Completed her 100th international cap in India's final group stage match against Australia on her 22nd birthday at the Four Nation Women's Tournament at Darwin in Australia on 3 June 2016.
- She was selected for Rio Olympics 2016, Brazil.

=== National ===
- Helped Odisha win the title in National School (U-17) Hockey Championship in 2009.
- Helped Odisha finish runners-up in the Hockey event of the Women's National Sports Festival at Bhopal in 2010.
- She was a member of the Odisha team that finished 3rd in the inaugural Hockey India Senior National Championship at Sonepat in 2011.
- Represented Odisha in 34th National games at Ranchi (Jharkhand) in 2011.
- Selected by Hockey India to join the Senior National Women coaching camp to be held at Major Dhyan Chand National Stadium in New Delhi from 27 December to 15 February 2011.

== Award ==
=== National honours ===
- 2022 – Arjuna Award, second highest sporting honour.

== Other information ==
- On 26 July 2016, Chief Minister Naveen Patnaik directed Odisha Mining Corporation to provide her a special incentive of Rs 10 lakh for participation in Rio Olympic Games.
- Odisha government on 10 October 2014 announced a cash award of Rs 75,000 lakh for Deep Grace for helping India win women's bronze medal in the 17th Asian Games at Incheon.
- Odisha Cricket Association on 2 October 2014 announced a cash award of Rs 10,000 for Deep Grace for helping India win the bronze medal in the 17th Asian Games at Incheon.
- On 11 August 2014, Mahanadi Coalfields Limited felicitated with a cash award of Rs 1 lakh for helping India win bronze medal in the 2013 Junior Women HockeyWorld Cup in Germany.
