= Kana Urata =

Japanese field hockey player

Personal information
- Born: 27 December 1998 (age 27) Osaka Prefecture, Japan
- Height: 164 cm (5 ft 5 in)
- Weight: 62 kg (137 lb)

Sport
- Sport: Field hockey
- Position: Midfield
Senior career
Years	Team	Caps	Goals
–	Coca Cola Red Sparks	-	-
National team
Years	Team	Caps	Goals
2019–	Japan	35	(6)
Medal record
Women's field hockey
Representing Japan
Asian Cup
Gold medal – first place	2022 Muscat	Team
FIH Hockey Series
Silver medal – second place	2018–19 Hiroshima	Team
Asian Champions Trophy
Gold medal – first place	2021 Donghae	Team
Silver medal – second place	2023 Ranchi	Team
Girls' Asia Cup
Silver medal – second place	2016 Bangkok

Kana Urata (浦田 果菜, born 27 December 1998) is a Japanese field hockey player.

== Personal life ==
Kana Urata was born in the Osaka Prefecture.

== Career ==
=== Domestic league ===
In the Japanese national league, Urata represents the Coca Cola Red Sparks.

=== Cherry Blossoms ===
Urata made her senior international debut in 2019 during a test series against Chile in Ibaraki. Later that year, she won silver at the FIH Series Finals in Hiroshima.

Throughout her career, Urata has medalled with the national team numerous times. She won gold at the 2022 Asian Cup in Muscat and the 2021 Asian Champions Trophy in Donghae City, and silver at the 2023 Asian Champions Trophy in Ranchi.

She was named in the squad for the 2024 FIH Olympic Qualifiers in Ranchi.
