= South Korea women's national field hockey team =

South Korea
- Association: Korea Hockey Association
- Confederation: AHF (Asia)
- Head Coach: Kim Yo-on
- Assistant coach(es): Kang Keon-wook; Yu Seung-jin
- Captain: Cheon Eun-bi
Home	Away

FIH ranking
- Current: 15 ▲2 (3 October 2026)

Olympic Games
- Appearances: 8 (first in 1988)
- Best result: (silver) 2nd (1988, 1996)

World Cup
- Appearances: 9 (first in 1990)
- Best result: (bronze) 3rd (1990)

Asian Games
- Appearances: 12 (first in 1982)
- Best result: (gold) 1st (1986, 1990, 1994, 1998, 2014)

Asia Cup
- Appearances: 11 (first in 1985)
- Best result: (gold) 1st (1985, 1993, 1999)
Medal record
Event	1st	2nd	3rd
Olympic Games	0	2	0
World Cup	0	0	1
Asian Games	5	4	0
Asia Cup	3	3	3
Champions Trophy	1	1	1
Asian Champions Trophy	3	1	0
Hockey World League	0	0	1
Total	12	11	6
Olympic Games
Silver medal – second place	1988 Seoul	Team
Silver medal – second place	1996 Atlanta	Team
World Cup
Bronze medal – third place	1990 Sydney	
Asian Games
Gold medal – first place	1986 Seoul	Team
Gold medal – first place	1990 Beijing	Team
Gold medal – first place	1994 Hiroshima	Team
Gold medal – first place	1998 Bangkok	Team
Gold medal – first place	2014 Incheon	Team
Silver medal – second place	1982 New Delhi	Team
Silver medal – second place	2002 Busan	Team
Silver medal – second place	2010 Guangzhou	Team
Silver medal – second place	2022 Hangzhou	Team
Asia Cup
Gold medal – first place	1985 Seoul	
Gold medal – first place	1993 Hiroshima	
Gold medal – first place	1999 New Delhi	
Silver medal – second place	2007 Hong Kong	
Silver medal – second place	2013 Kuala Lumpur	
Silver medal – second place	2022 Muscat	
Bronze medal – third place	1989 Hong Kong	
Bronze medal – third place	2009 Bangkok	
Bronze medal – third place	2017 Kakamigahara	
Champions Trophy
Gold medal – first place	1989 Frankfurt	
Silver medal – second place	1995 Mar del Plata	
Bronze medal – third place	1987 Amstelveen	
Asian Champions Trophy
Gold medal – first place	2010 Busan	
Gold medal – first place	2011 Ordos	
Gold medal – first place	2018 Donghae	
Silver medal – second place	2021 Donghae	
Hockey World League
Bronze medal – third place	2016–17 Auckland	Team

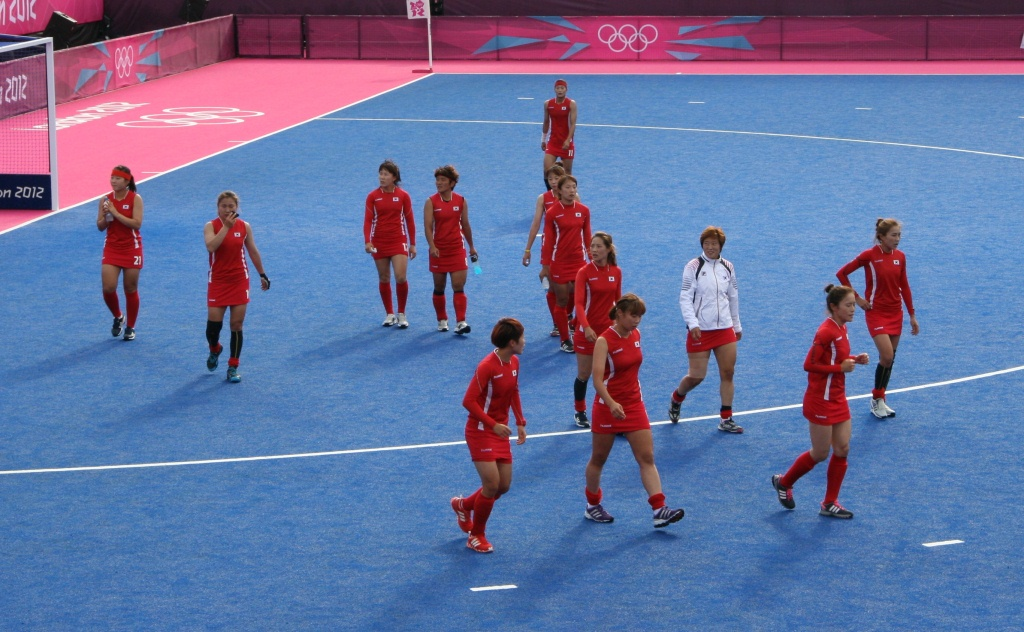
Korea women's national field hockey team at Riverbank Arena – London 2012 Summer Olympics

The South Korea women's national field hockey team (recognized as Korea by FIH) represents the South Korea. The team has participated in every Summer Olympic Games since 1988 and have won silver twice: at the 1988 Seoul Summer Olympics and at the 1996 Atlanta Summer Olympics. They won the gold medal at the 1989 Women's Hockey Champions Trophy and the bronze medal at the 1990 Women's Hockey World Cup.

== Tournament record ==
=== Summer Olympics ===
- 1988 – (silver)
- 1992 – 4th place
- 1996 – (silver)
- 2000 – 9th place
- 2004 – 7th place
- 2008 – 9th place
- 2012 – 8th place
- 2016 – 11th place
- 2020 – Did not qualify
- 2024 – Did not qualify

=== World Cup ===
- 1990 – (bronze)
- 1994 – 5th place
- 1998 – 5th place
- 2002 – 6th place
- 2006 – 9th place
- 2010 – 6th place
- 2014 – 7th place
- 2018 – 12th place
- 2022 – 13th place

=== Asian Games ===
- 1982 – (silver)
- 1986 – (gold)
- 1990 – (gold)
- 1994 – (gold)
- 1998 – (gold)
- 2002 – (silver)
- 2006 – 4th place
- 2010 – (silver)
- 2014 – (gold)
- 2018 – 4th place
- 2022 – (silver)
- 2026 – 4th place

=== Asia Cup ===
- 1985 – (gold)
- 1989 – (bronze)
- 1993 – (gold)
- 1999 – (gold)
- 2004 – 4th place
- 2007 – (silver)
- 2009 – (bronze)
- 2013 – (silver)
- 2017 – (bronze)
- 2022 – (silver)
- 2025 – 4th place

=== Asian Champions Trophy ===
- 2010 – (gold)
- 2011 – (gold)
- 2016 – 4th place
- 2018 – (gold)
- 2021 – (silver)
- 2023 – 4th place
- 2024 – 5th place
- 2026 – Qualified

=== World League ===
- 2012–13 – 8th place
- 2014–15 – 8th place
- 2016–17 – (bronze)

=== Hockey Nations Cup ===
- 2022 – 6th place
- 2023–24 – 8th place
- 2024–25 – 7th place
- 2025–26 – 5th place

=== Champions Trophy ===
- 1987 – (bronze)
- 1989 – (gold)
- 1991 – 6th place
- 1993 – 4th place
- 1995 – (silver)
- 1997 – 4th place
- 1999 – 6th place
- 2003 – 6th place
- 2005 – 6th place
- 2011 – 4th place
- 2012 – 7th place

=== Champions Challenge ===
- 2002 – (silver)
- 2007 – (silver)
- 2014 – 5th place

== Current squad ==
Roster for the 2022 Women's FIH Hockey World Cup.

Head coach: Han Jin-su

No.	Pos.	Player	Date of birth (age)	Caps	Club
2		Kim Min-ji	11 April 1999 (age 27)	5	
3		Jung Che-young	3 March 1999 (age 27)	5	
6		Ji Yu-jin	8 December 2000 (age 25)	1	
7		Seo Jung-eun	26 December 1991 (age 34)	67	
8		Park Seo-yeon	14 August 2004 (age 22)	0	
10		Cheon Eun-bi (captain)	7 February 1992 (age 34)	131	
11		Kang Ji-na	10 January 1993 (age 33)	27	
13		Choi Su-ji	14 June 1993 (age 33)	39	
14		Lee Yu-ri	6 September 1994 (age 32)	86	
16		Kim Jeong-in	30 November 1998 (age 27)	16	
17		Seo Su-young	30 January 1996 (age 30)	1	
19		Cho Hye-jin	16 January 1995 (age 31)	95	
20		Kim Hyun-ji	4 November 1993 (age 33)	104	
22		An Su-jin	9 January 2002 (age 24)	1	
23		Kim Seo-na	23 September 2000 (age 26)	22	
26		Lee Ju-yeon	12 February 2001 (age 25)	5	
27		Pak Ho-jeong	27 March 1996 (age 30)	10	
28		Lee Seung-ju	7 November 1995 (age 31)	28	
30	GK	Lee Jin-min	13 November 1993 (age 33)	10	
31	GK	Kim Eun-ji	9 February 2000 (age 26)	0	

== Results and fixtures ==
The following is a list of match results in the last 12 months, as well as any future matches that have been scheduled.

Win Draw Loss Fixture

=== 2026 ===
==== 2026 Women's FIH World Cup Qualifiers ====
8 March 2026 Pool A	South Korea	1–0	Austria	Hyderabad, India
15:00	Kim 34'	Report		Stadium: G. M. C. Balayogi Hockey Ground

9 March 2026 Pool A	South Korea	0–3	England	Hyderabad, India
15:00		Report	Walker 16'; Neal 38'; Balsdon 44'	Stadium: G. M. C. Balayogi Hockey Ground

11 March 2026 Pool A	Italy	1–1	South Korea	Hyderabad, India
15:00	Carta 7'	Report	Choi J. 26'	Stadium: G. M. C. Balayogi Hockey Ground

13 March 2026 5/8 Classification	South Korea	1–2	Wales	Hyderabad, India
12:45	Park Y. 46'	Report	Bingham 49', 53'	Stadium: G. M. C. Balayogi Hockey Ground

14 March 2026 7/8 Classification	South Korea	1–1 (1–2 p)	Austria	Hyderabad, India
12:45	Lee 31'	Report	Vukovich 3'	Stadium: G. M. C. Balayogi Hockey Ground
	Penalties
	Yu-jin (penalty shoot-out scored); Kim (penalty shoot-out missed); Park (penalty shoot-out missed); Choi (penalty shoot-out missed); Lee (penalty shoot-out missed)		(penalty shoot-out scored) Czech; (penalty shoot-out missed) Proksch; (penalty shoot-out missed) Kern; (penalty shoot-out missed) Bauer; (penalty shoot-out scored) Kemper

==== Test matches ====
11 April 2026 Test 1	Japan	1–0	South Korea	Tokyo, Japan
15:30	Murayama 43'	Report		Stadium: Oi Hockey Stadium

12 April 2026 Test 2	Japan	1–1	South Korea	Tokyo, Japan
13:00	Shimada 39'	Report	Choi 21'	Stadium: Oi Hockey Stadium

==== 2026 FIH Nations Cup ====
15 June 2026 Pool B	New Zealand	3–1	South Korea	Auckland, New Zealand
18:00	K. Cotter 10'; Gravenall 40'; H. Cotter 41'	Report	Choi 31'	Stadium: National Hockey Centre

16 June 2026 Pool B	South Korea	1–1	France	Auckland, New Zealand
15:45	Y. Lee 48'	Report	Zanden 43'	Stadium: National Hockey Centre

18 June 2026 Pool B	South Korea	2–2	Chile	Auckland, New Zealand
15:45	Choi 16'; Lee Y. 29'	Report	Arrieta 1', 14'	Stadium: National Hockey Centre

20 June 2026 5/8 Classification	South Korea	2–1	Uruguay	Auckland, New Zealand
13:30	Jeong-ihn 18'; S. Park 55'	Report	Vilar 51'	Stadium: National Hockey Centre

21 June 2026 5/6 Classification	Japan	0–0 (4–5 p)	South Korea	Auckland, New Zealand
13:30		Report		Stadium: National Hockey Centre
	Penalties
	Shimada (penalty shoot-out scored); Nakagomi (penalty shoot-out missed); Kobayakawa (penalty shoot-out scored); Hasegawa (penalty shoot-out missed); Suzuki (penalty shoot-out scored); Ueno (penalty shoot-out scored); Suzuki (penalty shoot-out missed)		(penalty shoot-out missed) Choi; (penalty shoot-out scored) Yu-ri; (penalty shoot-out missed) Park; (penalty shoot-out scored) Yu-ri; (penalty shoot-out scored) An; (penalty shoot-out scored) Yu-jin; (penalty shoot-out scored) An

==== 2026 Asian Games ====
18 September 2026 Pool A	South Korea	3–1	Chinese Taipei	Kakamigahara, Japan
13:00	Park 13', 33'; An 42'	Report	Wang 41'	Stadium: Gifu Prefectural Green Stadium

21 September 2026 Pool A	South Korea	7–0	Kazakhstan	Kakamigahara, Japan
09:00	Park Mi. 1'; An 28'; Kim J. 29'; L. Yu-ri 31'; Choi 39'; Park Seu. 39'; Jung 40'	Report		Stadium: Gifu Prefectural Green Stadium

23 September 2026 Pool A	Bangladesh	0–8	South Korea	Kakamigahara, Japan
09:00		Report	Choi 5', 19'; Park Seu. 12', 15', 23', 60'; Park Mi. 28'; Kim Seo. 34'	Stadium: Gifu Prefectural Green Stadium

25 September 2026 Pool A	South Korea	0–3	China	Kakamigahara, Japan
13:00		Report	Zhang 40'; Liu 46'; Chen Ya. 60'	Stadium: Gifu Prefectural Green Stadium

27 September 2026 Pool A	Malaysia	1–2	South Korea	Kakamigahara, Japan
15:00	Syafi 60'	Report	Park Seu. 15+'; An 29'	Stadium: Gifu Prefectural Green Stadium

30 September 2026 Semi-final	India	2–0	South Korea	Kakamigahara, Japan
19:00	Ishika 44'; Tete 48'	Report		Stadium: Gifu Prefectural Green Stadium

2 October 2026 Bronze medal match	Japan	0–0 (4–2 p)	South Korea	Kakamigahara, Japan
16:30		Report		Stadium: Gifu Prefectural Green Stadium
	Penalties
	Shimada (penalty shoot-out scored); Murayama (penalty shoot-out scored); Hasegawa (penalty shoot-out scored); Kobayakawa (penalty shoot-out scored)		(penalty shoot-out missed) Jung; (penalty shoot-out missed) Park Seu. (penalty shoot-out scored) An; (penalty shoot-out scored) L. Yu-jin

==== 2026 Asian Champions Trophy ====
19 November 2026 Round-robin	Japan	1–0	South Korea	Bhopal, India
14:20	Saito 59'	Report		Stadium: Barkheda Nathu International Sports Complex

21 November 2026 Round-robin	India	2–1	South Korea	Bhopal, India
19:00	Mumtaz 30'; Toppo 34'	Report	Hong 56'	Stadium: Barkheda Nathu International Sports Complex

22 November 2026 Round-robin	South Korea	1–3	Malaysia	Bhopal, India
15:00	Mun 36'	Report	Syafi 33'; Zulkifli 38'; Siti 60'	Stadium: Barkheda Nathu International Sports Complex

24 November 2026 Round-robin	South Korea	v	Thailand	Bhopal, India
14:30				Stadium: Barkheda Nathu International Sports Complex

25 November 2026 Round-robin	China	v	South Korea	Bhopal, India
16:45				Stadium: Barkheda Nathu International Sports Complex

== See also ==
- South Korea women's national under-21 field hockey team
