= Sonika Tandi =

Indian field hockey player

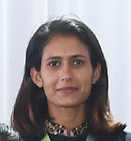
- Tandi in August 2022

Personal information
- Born: 20 March 1997 (age 29) Galad, Churu district, Rajasthan, India

Sport
- Sport: Field hockey
- Position: Midfielder
Senior career
Years	Team	Caps	Goals
–	Income Tax	-	-
2025–	Odisha Warriors	-	-
National team
Years	Team	Caps	Goals
2016–	India	91	(7)
Medal record
Women's field hockey
Representing India
Asian Games
Bronze medal – third place	2022 Hangzhou	Team
Commonwealth Games
Bronze medal – third place	2022 Birmingham	Team
Asia Cup
Gold medal – first place	2017 Gifu
Asian Champions Trophy
Gold medal – first place	2023 Ranchi
FIH Nations Cup
Gold medal – first place	2022 Spain
South Asian Games
Gold medal – first place	2016 Guwahati	Team

Sonika Tandi (born 20 March 1997) is an Indian field hockey player who plays as a midfielder for the Indian national team.

She was part of the Indian squad that won the gold medal at the 2017 Women's Hockey Asia Cup.
