= Cho Hye-jin (field hockey) =

South Korean field hockey player

Personal information
- Born: 16 January 1995 (age 31) Pyeongtaek, South Korea
- Height: 1.60 m (5 ft 3 in)
- Weight: 56 kg (123 lb)

Sport
- Sport: Field hockey
National team
| Years | Team | Caps | Goals |
| 2015– | South Korea | 67 | - |
Medal record
Women's field hockey
Representing South Korea
Asian Games
| Silver medal – second place | 2022 Hangzhou | Team |
Asia Cup
| Silver medal – second place | 2022 Muscat |
| Bronze medal – third place | 2017 Gifu |
Asian Champions Trophy
| Silver medal – second place | 2021 Donghae |

- Cho Hye-jin
- Hangul: 조혜진
- RR: Jo Hyejin
- MR: Cho Hyejin

Cho Hye-jin (Korean: 조혜진, born 16 January 1995) is a South Korean field hockey player. She competed for the South Korea women's national field hockey team at the 2016 Summer Olympics.
