= 2022 Women's Hockey Asia Cup =

International field hockey tournament

2022 Women's Asia Cup
Tournament details
- Host country: Oman
- City: Muscat
- Dates: 21–28 January
- Teams: 8 (from 1 confederation)
- Venue: Sultan Qaboos Sports Complex

Final positions
- Champions: Japan (3rd title)
- Runner-up: South Korea
- Third place: India

Tournament statistics
- Matches played: 20
- Goals scored: 101 (5.05 per match)
- Top scorer: (South Korea) Cheon Eun-bi (7 goals)
- Best player: (Japan) Yu Asai
- Best young player: (India) Salima Tete
- Best goalkeeper: (South Korea) Lee Jin-min

The 2022 Women's Hockey Asia Cup was the 10th edition of the Women's Hockey Asia Cup, the quadrennial international women's field hockey championship of Asia organized by the Asian Hockey Federation. It was held from 21 to 28 January 2022 at the Sultan Qaboos Sports Complex in Muscat, Oman.

The tournament was originally scheduled to be held in Bangkok, Thailand but on 29 December 2021 the tournament was moved to Muscat, Oman.

India were the defending champions. Japan won their third title after a final win over South Korea.

The top four teams qualified for the 2022 Women's FIH Hockey World Cup.

== Qualified teams ==
The following eight teams participated in the tournament.

- China
- India
- Indonesia
- Japan
- Malaysia
- Singapore
- South Korea
- Thailand

== Preliminary round ==
The schedule was released on 3 January 2021.

All times are local (UTC+4).

=== Pool A ===
Pos	Team	Pld	W	D	L	GF	GA	GD	Pts	Qualification
1	Japan	3	3	0	0	16	0	+16	9	Semi-finals
2	India	3	2	0	1	18	3	+15	6	Semi-finals
3	Malaysia	3	1	0	2	2	17	−15	3	
4	Singapore	3	0	0	3	1	17	−16	0	

Source: FIH
Rules for classification: 1) points; 2) matches won; 3) goal difference; 4) goals for; 5) head-to-head result; 6) field goals for.

21 January 2022
16:00

Japan	6–0	Singapore
Asai 14', 55'; Oikawa 18', 31', 55'; Shimada 33'	Report

Umpires:
Lisette Baljon (NED)
Kim Yoon-seon (KOR)

21 January 2022
20:00

India	9–0	Malaysia
Vandana 8', 34'; Ekka 10'; Sushila 15', 27'; Lalremsiami 38'; Monika 40'; Sharmila 46', 59'	Report

Umpires:
Rebecca Woodcock (ENG)
Kang Hyun-young (KOR)

23 January 2022
17:00

Malaysia	2–0	Singapore
Sukri 6'; Rashid 8'	Report

Umpires:
Kang Hyun-young (KOR)
Lisette Baljon (NED)

23 January 2022
19:00

Japan	2–0	India
Nagai 2'; S. Tanaka 42'	Report

Umpires:
Rebecca Woodcock (ENG)
Kim Yoon-seon (KOR)

24 January 2022
17:00

Malaysia	0–8	Japan
	Report	Nagai 4'; K. Tanaka 16', 28', 39'; Oikawa 20'; Toriyama 30'; Urata 48'; Omoto 57'

Umpires:
Ornpimol Kittiteerasopon (THA)
Kim Yoon-seon (KOR)

24 January 2022
19:00

India	9–1	Singapore
Monika 6', 17'; Vandana 8'; G. Kaur 8', 37', 48'; Kujur 10'; Jyoti 43', 58'	Report	Toh 43'

Umpires:
Junko Wagatsuma (JPN)
Kang Hyun-young (KOR)

=== Pool B ===
Pos	Team	Pld	W	D	L	GF	GA	GD	Pts	Qualification
1	South Korea	3	3	0	0	17	0	+17	9	Semi-finals
2	China	3	2	0	1	13	5	+8	6	Semi-finals
3	Thailand	3	1	0	2	5	12	−7	3	
4	Indonesia	3	0	0	3	0	18	−18	0	

Source: FIH
Rules for classification: 1) points; 2) matches won; 3) goal difference; 4) goals for; 5) head-to-head result; 6) field goals for.

21 January 2022
14:00

South Korea	7–0	Indonesia
Lee S. 5'; Kim Ji. 11'; Baek 13', 38'; Lee Ju. 25'; Cheon 53', 60'	Report

Umpires:
Cookie Tan (SGP)
Ornpimol Kittiteerasopon (THA)

21 January 2022
18:00

China	6–1	Thailand
Yong 13'; Wang 16'; Zhong 29', 33'; Deng 48', 51'	Report	Konthong 59'

Umpires:
Shweta Patil (IND)
Junko Wagatsuma (JPN)

22 January 2022
17:00

South Korea	4–0	China
Cheon 21'; Kang 36'; Shin 46'; Cho 53'	Report

Umpires:
Khamis Al-Bulushi (OMA)
Shweta Patil (IND)

22 January 2022
19:00

Thailand	4–0	Indonesia
Noo-Keaw 10', 51'; Piresram 16'; Wongkeaw 58'	Report

Umpires:
Junko Wagatsuma (JPN)
Khalil Al-Bulushi (OMA)

24 January 2022
13:00

China	7–0	Indonesia
Yang 7'; Chen F. 16'; Liu 27'; Zhong 30+'; Chen Y. 33'; Guo 34'; Wang 56'	Report

Umpires:
Cookie Tan (SGP)
Ornpimol Kittiteerasopon (THA)

24 January 2022
15:00

Thailand	0–6	South Korea
	Report	Baek 14'; Seo 19'; Cheon 23', 48'; Kim S. 30'; Cho 33'

Umpires:
Shweta Patil (IND)
Junko Wagatsuma (JPN)

== Fifth to eighth place classification ==
=== Bracket ===
Semi-finals
26 January
Thailand	1
Singapore	0
26 January
Malaysia	6
Indonesia	0

Fifth place
27 January
Thailand	0
Malaysia	3
Seventh place
27 January
Singapore	2
Indonesia	1

=== 5–8th place semi-finals ===
26 January 2022
11:30

Thailand	1–0	Singapore
Aunjai 60'	Report

Umpires:
Khalil Al-Balushi (OMA)
Shweta Patil (IND)

26 January 2022
14:00

Malaysia	6–0	Indonesia
Shabuddin 3'; Rashid 5', 49'; Zulkifli 44'; Isahhidun 52'; Sukri 55'	Report

Umpires:
Khamis Al-Balushi (OMA)
Ornmipol Kittiteerasopon (THA)

=== Seventh place game ===
27 January 2022
16:30

Singapore	2–1	Indonesia
Ng 45'; Toh 56'	Report	Rahmadhani 60'

Umpires:
Ornpimol Kittiteerasopon (THA)
Khalil Al-Bulushi (OMA)

=== Fifth place game ===
27 January 2022
19:00

Thailand	0–3	Malaysia
	Report	Azhar 5'; Din 22'; Shabuddin 46'

Umpires:
Junko Wagatsuma (JPN)
Khamis Al-Bulushi (OMA)

== Medal round ==
=== Bracket ===
Semi-finals
26 January
South Korea	3
India	2
26 January
Japan	2
China	1

Final
28 January
South Korea	2
Japan	4
Third place
28 January
India	2
China	0

=== Semi-finals ===
26 January 2022
16:30

South Korea	3–2	India
Cheon 31'; Lee S. 45'; Cho 47'	Report	Neha 28'; Lalremsiami 54'

Umpires:
Lisette Baljon (NED)
Cookie Tan (SGP)

26 January 2022
19:00

Japan	2–1	China
Shimada 24'; Tanaka 50'	Report	Wang 18'

Umpires:
Kang Hyun-young (KOR)
Rebecca Woodcock (ENG)

=== Third place game ===
28 January 2022
16:30

India	2–0	China
Sharmila 13'; Gurjit 19'	Report

Umpires:
Lisette Baljon (NED)
Kim Yoon-seon (KOR)

=== Final ===
28 January 2022
19:00

South Korea	2–4	Japan
Lee S. 12'; Cheon 34'	Report	Tanaka 28', 45'; Mori 37'; Nagai 46'

Umpires:
Rebecca Woodcock (ENG)
Cookie Tan (SGP)

== Final standings ==
Rank	Team
Gold medal	Japan
Silver medal	South Korea
Bronze medal	India
4	China
5	Malaysia
6	Thailand
7	Singapore
8	Indonesia

Qualified for the 2022 Women's FIH Hockey World Cup

== Goalscorers ==
There were 101 goals scored in 20 matches, for an average of 5.05 goals per match.

7 goals

- (South Korea) Cheon Eun-bi

6 goals

- (Japan) Kaho Tanaka

4 goals

- (Japan) Shihori Oikawa
- (India) Gurjit Kaur

3 goals

- (China) Zhong Mengling
- (China) Wang Shumin
- (India) Vandana Katariya
- (India) Sharmila Devi
- (India) Monika Malik
- (Japan) Yuri Nagai
- (Malaysia) Nuraini Rashid
- (South Korea) Baek Ee-seul
- (South Korea) Cho Hye-jin
- (South Korea) Lee Seung-ju

2 goals

- (China) Deng Xue
- (India) Sushila Chanu
- (India) Jyoti
- (India) Lalremsiami
- (Japan) Yu Asai
- (Japan) Amiru Shimada
- (Malaysia) Norsharina Shabuddin
- (Malaysia) Fatin Sukri
- (Singapore) Toh Li Min
- (Thailand) Sudarat Noo-Keaw

1 goal

- (China) Chen Feiping
- (China) Chen Yujun
- (China) Guo Qiu
- (China) Liu Qingmei
- (China) Yang Liu
- (China) Yong Jing
- (Indonesia) Yuanita Rahmadhani
- (India) Deep Grace Ekka
- (India) Mariana Kujur
- (India) Neha Goyal
- (Japan) Sakurako Omoto
- (Japan) Saki Tanaka
- (Japan) Mai Toriyama
- (Japan) Kana Urata
- (Japan) Kanon Mori
- (Malaysia) Nur Azhar
- (Malaysia) Juliani Din
- (Malaysia) Nor Isahhidun
- (Malaysia) Nuramirah Zulkifli
- (Singapore) Jolene Ng
- (South Korea) Kang Ji-na
- (South Korea) Kim Ji-yun
- (South Korea) Kim Seo-na
- (South Korea) Lee Ju-yeon
- (South Korea) Seo Jung-eun
- (South Korea) Shin Hye-jeong
- (Thailand) Natthakarn Aunjai
- (Thailand) Suwapat Konthong
- (Thailand) Anongnat Piresram
- (Thailand) Sirikwan Wongkeaw

Source: FIH

== See also ==
- 2022 Men's Hockey Asia Cup
- 2022 Women's Indoor Hockey Asia Cup
- 2022 Women's FIH Hockey World Cup
- Field hockey at the 2022 Asian Games – Women's tournament
