= Rajwinder Kaur (field hockey, born 1998) =

Indian hockey player

Personal information
- Born: 19 November 1998 (age 27) Mugal Chak, Tarn Taran, Punjab, India

Sport
- Sport: Field hockey
- Position: Forward
- Club: Indian Oil Corporation Ltd
Youth career
- Years: Team
- 2016–: India U18
Senior career
Years	Team	Caps	Goals
–	Indian Oil Corporation Ltd	-	-
National team
Years	Team	Caps	Goals
2021–	India	4	(2)
Medal record
Women's field hockey
Representing India
Girls' Asia Cup
Bronze medal – third place	2016 Bangkok

Rajwinder Kaur (born 19 November 1998) is an Indian field hockey player and a former member of Indian women's hockey team. She hails from Punjab. She plays for Indian Oil Corporation Limited in the domestic hockey tournaments. She plays as a forward.

== Early life ==
Rajwinder hails from a small village Mugal Chak in Naushehra Pannua taluk, near Tarn Taran in Punjab. Her father is an auto-rickshaw driver and her mother is a home maker. She is the eldest daughter and has two younger sisters and a brother. She studied Sri Guru Arjun Dev Public School, where her seniors encouraged her in 2015 to take up hockey.

== Career ==
She made her youth India debut in 2016 when she was selected for the Under-18 Asia Cup. In 2017 she was called for the Senior India camp. She was part of the Indian team that player the FIH Pro-League at Bhubaneswar in April 2022.
