= 2021 Women's Asian Champions Trophy =

Field hockey competition

Donghae Women's Asian Champions Trophy 2021

Tournament details
- Host country: South Korea
- City: Donghae
- Dates: 5–11 December
- Teams: 4 (from 1 confederation)
- Venue: Donghae City Sunrise Stadium

Final positions
- Champions: Japan (2nd title)
- Runner-up: South Korea
- Third place: China

Tournament statistics
- Matches played: 9
- Goals scored: 50 (5.56 per match)
- Top scorer: (India) Gurjit Kaur (5 goals)
- Best player: (South Korea) Cheon Eun-bi
- Best young player: (South Korea) Kim Seo-na
- Best goalkeeper: (Thailand) Siraya Yimkrajang

The 2021 Women's Asian Champions Trophy was the sixth edition of the Women's Asian Champions Trophy, a biennial field hockey tournament for the six best Asian women's national teams organized by the Asian Hockey Federation.

The tournament was held at the Donghae City Sunrise Stadium in Donghae, South Korea and it was originally scheduled from 14 to 21 June 2020. South Korea were the defending champions.

Due to the COVID-19 pandemic the tournament was postponed on 26 March 2020. In September 2020 the new dates were announced and the tournament would be held from 31 March to 6 April 2021. In January 2021 the tournament was postponed again and in October was postponed further to 5 to 12 December 2021.

== Teams ==
The following four teams participated in the tournament. Malaysia could not play their first two matches of the tournament and eventually had to withdraw due to Covid-related issues. On 9 December India also had to withdraw from the tournament due to the same reason.

Team	Appearance	Last appearance	Previous best performance
China	6th	2018	2nd (2011, 2016)
Japan	6th	2018	1st (2013)
South Korea	5th	2018	1st (2010, 2011, 2018)
Thailand (Note: Due to non-compliance with conditions set by the World Anti-Doping Agency (WADA), Thailand was not allowed to be represented by its national flag.)	1st	None	Debut

== Results ==
All times are local, KST (UTC+9).

=== First round ===
Pos	Team	Pld	W	D	L	GF	GA	GD	Pts	Qualification
1	Japan	3	3	0	0	10	2	+8	9	Final
2	South Korea (H)	3	2	0	1	6	3	+3	6	Final
3	China	3	1	0	2	12	6	+6	3	Third place game
4	Thailand	3	0	0	3	0	17	−17	0	Third place game
5	India	0	0	0	0	0	0	0	0	Withdrew
6	Malaysia	0	0	0	0	0	0	0	0	Withdrew

Source: FIH
Rules for classification: 1) points; 2) matches won; 3) goal difference; 4) goals for; 5) head-to-head result; 6) field goals for.
(H) Hosts

5 December 2021
12:45

India	13–0	Thailand
Gurjit 2', 14', 24', 25', 58'; Vandana 7'; Lilima 14', 24'; Jyoti 15', 36'; Rajwinder 16'; Sonika 43'; Monika 55'	Report

Umpires:
Lelia Sacre (CAN)
Kim Jung-hee (KOR)

5 December 2021
15:00

South Korea	0–1	Japan
	Report	Mori 50'

Umpires:
Liu Xiaoying (CHN)
Rama Potnis (IND)

6 December 2021
12:45

China	2–3	Japan
Ma 2'; Zhang Y. 4'	Report	Mori 28', 60'; Urata 53'

Umpires:
Ayanna McClean (TTO)
Kang Hyun-young (KOR)

6 December 2021
15:00

Thailand	0–3	South Korea
	Report	Baek 8'; Kim Ji. 29'; Kim Je. 36'

Umpires:
Norasyikin Shariudin (MAS)
Ymkje van Slooten (NED)

8 December 2021
12:45

Thailand	0–8	China
	Report	Fan 10'; Gu 17'; Zou 24'; Zhong 30'; Zhang Y. 35'; Zhang X. 40'; Liu 53', 60'

Umpires:
Minami Inamoto (JPN)
Lelia Sacre (CAN)

9 December 2021
11:00

Japan	6–0	Thailand
Oikawa 13'; Suzuki 16'; Mori 31'; Shimada 39'; Y. Nagai 42'; Toriyama 57'	Report

Umpires:
Rama Potnis (IND)
Kim Jung-hee (KOR)

9 December 2021
13:15

South Korea	3–2	China
Kim Ji. 26'; Cho 51'; Kim S. 54'	Report	Liu 14'; Zhang Y. 48'

Umpires:
Ymkje van Slooten (NED)
Ayanna McClean (TTO)

=== Classification round ===
==== Third place game ====
11 December 2021
11:00

China	6–0	Thailand
Zhong 3'; Ma 7'; Zou 15', 30', 34'; Zhang X. 28'	Report

Umpires:
Minami Inamoto (JPN)
Kang Hyun-young (KOR)

==== Final ====
11 December 2021
13:30

Japan	2–1	South Korea
H. Nagai 27'; K. Tanaka 27'	Report	Kang 1'

Umpires:
Liu Xiaoying (CHN)
Ayanna McClean (TTO)

== Statistics ==
=== Final standings ===
1. Japan
2. South Korea
3. China
4. Thailand

=== Goalscorers ===
There were 50 goals scored in 9 matches, for an average of 5.56 goals per match.

5 goals

- (India) Gurjit Kaur

4 goals

- (China) Zou Meirong
- (Japan) Kanon Mori

3 goals

- (China) Liu Hua
- (China) Zhang Ying

2 goals

- (China) Ma Ning
- (China) Zhang Xindan
- (China) Zhong Jiaqi
- (India) Jyoti
- (India) Lilima Minz
- (South Korea) Kim Ji-yun

1 goal

- (China) Fan Yunxia
- (China) Gu Yangyan
- (India) Vandana Katariya
- (India) Rajwinder Kaur
- (India) Monika Malik
- (India) Sonika
- (Japan) Hazuka Nagai
- (Japan) Yuri Nagai
- (Japan) Shihori Oikawa
- (Japan) Amiru Shimada
- (Japan) Miyu Suzuki
- (Japan) Kaho Tanaka
- (Japan) Mai Toriyama
- (Japan) Kana Urata
- (South Korea) Baek Ee-seul
- (South Korea) Cho Hye-jin
- (South Korea) Kang Ji-na
- (South Korea) Kim Jeong
- (South Korea) Kim Seo-na

Source: FIH

== See also ==
- 2021 Men's Asian Champions Trophy
