= Women's Asian Champions Trophy =

Biennial hockey competition

- Upcoming season or competition: 2026 Women's Asian Champions Trophy
- Sport: Field hockey
- Founded: 2010; 16 years ago
- First season: 2010
- No. of teams: 6
- Confederation: Asian Hockey Federation
- Most recent champion: India (3rd title) (2024)
- Most titles: India; South Korea (3 titles each)

The Women's Asian Champions Trophy is a biennial women's international field hockey competition contested by the best six women's national teams of the member associations of Asian Hockey Federation.

The tournament has been won by three teams. India and South Korea have the most wins with three titles each. In 2021, the tournament expanded to six teams.

== Results ==
| # | Year | Host | Final | | | Third place match | | | Teams |
| # | Year | Host | Winner | Score | Runner-up | Third place | Score | Fourth place | Teams |
|---|---|---|---|---|---|---|---|---|---|
| 1 | 2010; Details | Busan, South Korea | South Korea | 2–1 | Japan | India | 2–1 | China | 4 |
| 2 | 2011; Details | Ordos, China | South Korea | 5–3 | China | Japan | 3–2 | India | 4 |
| 3 | 2013; Details | Kakamigahara, Japan | Japan | 1–0 | India | Malaysia | 3–1 | China | 4 |
| 4 | 2016; Details | Singapore | India | 2–1 | China | Japan | 2–1 | South Korea | 5 |
| 5 | 2018; Details | Donghae, South Korea | South Korea | 1–0 | India | China | 2–0 | Malaysia | 5 |
| 6 | 2021; Details | Donghae, South Korea | Japan | 2–1 | South Korea | China | 6–0 | Thailand | 4 |
| 7 | 2023; Details | Ranchi, India | India | 4–0 | Japan | China | 2–1 | South Korea | 6 |
| 8 | 2024; Details | Rajgir, India | India | 1–0 | China | Japan | 4–1 | Malaysia | 6 |
| 9 | 2026; Details | Bhopal, India | | | | | | | 6 |

== Summary ==
| Team | Winners | Runners-up | Third place | Fourth place |
|---|---|---|---|---|
| India | 3 (2016, 2023*, 2024*) | 2 (2013, 2018) | 1 (2010) | 1 (2011) |
| South Korea | 3 (2010*, 2011, 2018*) | 1 (2021*) | | 2 (2016, 2023) |
| Japan | 2 (2013*, 2021) | 2 (2010, 2023) | 3 (2011, 2016, 2024) | |
| China | | 3 (2011*, 2016, 2024) | 3 (2018, 2021, 2023) | 2 (2010, 2013) |
| Malaysia | | | 1 (2013) | 2 (2018, 2024) |
| Thailand | | | | 1 (2021) |

* = host nation

== Team appearances ==
| Team | (South Korea) 2010 | (China) 2011 | (Japan) 2013 | (Singapore) 2016 | (South Korea) 2018 | (South Korea) 2021 | (India) 2023 | (India) 2024 | (India) 2026 | Total |
|---|---|---|---|---|---|---|---|---|---|---|
| China | 4th | 2nd | 4th | 2nd | 3rd | 3rd | 3rd | 2nd | Q | 9 |
| India | 3rd | 4th | 2nd | 1st | 2nd | WD | 1st | 1st | Q | 8 |
| Japan | 2nd | 3rd | 1st | 3rd | 5th | 1st | 2nd | 3rd | Q | 9 |
| Malaysia | – | – | 3rd | 5th | 4th | WD | 5th | 4th | Q | 6 |
| South Korea | 1st | 1st | – | 4th | 1st | 2nd | 4th | 5th | Q | 8 |
| Thailand | — | — | – | – | – | 4th | 6th | 6th | Q | 4 |
| Total (6) | 4 | 4 | 4 | 5 | 5 | 4 | 6 | 6 | 6 | |

^ WD = Withdrew

== See also ==
- Men's Asian Champions Trophy
- Women's Hockey Asia Cup
