= Field hockey at the 2026 Asian Games – Women's team squads =

Twelve national teams are competing in the women's field hockey tournament at the 2026 Asian Games in Japan. A maximum of eighteen players are officially enrolled in each squad.

== Pool A ==
=== Bangladesh ===
The following is the Bangladesh roster in the women's field hockey tournament of the 2026 Asian Games.

Head coach: (Bangladesh) Zahid Hossain

1. Mohua (GK)
2. Neeladri Neel
3. Mst Annika
4. Ritu Akter
5. Ninisen Rakhain
6. Sanjida Moni
7. Sharika Rimon
8. Riyasha Rishi
9. Nadira
10. Orpita Pal (C)
11. Fardia Ratry
12. Airin Riya
13. Mst Lima
14. Mst Khatun
15. Kona Akter
16. Nadira Ema
17. Fatema Tuzzohora
18. Heemadri Sukh (GK)

=== China ===
The following is the China roster in the women's field hockey tournament of the 2026 Asian Games.

Head coach: (Australia) Alyson Annan

3. Yang Liu
6. Zhang Ying
7. Chen Yi
9. Ma Ning
10. Zhong Jiaqi
11. Dan Wen
13. Li Hong
16. Ou Zixia (C)
17. Peng Yang
18. Zou Meirong
20. He Jiangxin
23. Fan Yunxia
26. Chen Yang
29. Liu Ping (GK)
35. Tan Jinzhuang
36. Liu Chencheng
50. Li Ting (GK)
53. Chen Tong
58. Yu Anhui
64. Luo Yaxi

=== Chinese Taipei ===
The following is the Chinese Taipei roster in the women's field hockey tournament of the 2026 Asian Games.

Head coach: (Chinese Taipei) Lin Min Nan

2. Wang Yu-Chiu
3. Tsai Chen Wei
5. Liao Pei-Shan
7. Huang Pei-Lun
8. Chen Ting-Chun
9. Yang Wan Wen
10. Pu Agustin-Linmey (C)
11. Fan Hui-Yun
12. Lai Ya-Han
13. Chang, Tzu-Ling
14. Mao I-Hsuan
15. Huang Yu-Ting
17. Zhu Yi-Chun
18. Lo Tzu-Yin (GK)
19. Wang Shih-Han
20. Ye Shu-Qin
23. Chang Chih-Hsien
24. Wang Wen-Tsen
26. Yao Wen-Xuan (GK)

=== Kazakhstan ===
The following is the Kazakhstan roster in the women's field hockey tournament of the 2026 Asian Games.

Head coach: (Kazakhstan) Serik Kalimbayev

1. Guzal Bakhavaddin (C,GK)
2. Viktoriya Shaimardanova
3. Dilnaz Khairusheva
4. Albina Dymchan
5. Natalya Sazontova
7. Viktoriya Lyapina
9. Uilbolsyn Zhetkergenova
10. Vera Domasheva
11. Ismira Apsatarova
12. Karlygash Bolganbayeva
14. Munira Temirgaliyeva
15. Natalya Gataulina
16. Dilnaz Olzhabayeva (GK)
17. Zhanel Izbassar
18. Viktoriya Lobanova
19. Assel Omirkhankyzy
20. Azkhan Yersultan
22. Gulsina Izbassarova
24. Eteliya Mailyan
29. Elvira Lutsenko

=== South Korea ===
The following is the South Korea roster in the women's field hockey tournament of the 2026 Asian Games.

Head coach: (South Korea) Kim Yong-soo

1. Kim Eun-ji (GK)
2. Kim Yu-jin
4. Hong Sol-beot-nara
5. Kim Jung-ju
6. An Su-jin
7. Lee Yu-ri (C)
8. Kim Seon-a
9. Park Seung-ae
10. Lee Yu-jin
11. Jung Sung-hee
12. Lee Ju-yeon
13. Jin Su-yeon
14. Park Seo-yeon
16. Kim Jeong-ihn
17. Seo Da-hae
18. Park Yeong-eun
19. Choi Ji-yun
23. Park Mi-hyang
26. Son Hye-ryoung
31. Lee Seo-yeon (GK)

=== Malaysia ===
The following is the Malaysia roster in the women's field hockey tournament of the 2026 Asian Games.

Head coach: (India) C.R Kumar

2. Zati Muhamad
4. Siti Mohd
6. Zawiatul Hartomo
7. Azmyra Azhairy
9. Nurhanie Tarmizi
11. Nur Azhar
12. Nur Mazlan
13. Nur Mohd
14. Siti Shaikh
17. Anith Humaira Baharudin
18. Nur Shamine Azureen
19. Insyirah Effarizal
20. Fitrinur Ramlee (GK)
21. Fatin Sukri
22. Siti Husain
25. Khairunnisa Mohd
26. Nuramirah Zulkifli
27. Nurmaizatul Syafi
32. Nur Zainal (GK)
35. Noor Hasliza Ali (C)

== Pool B ==
=== India ===
The following is the India roster in the women's field hockey tournament of the 2026 Asian Games.

Head coach: (Netherlands) Sjoerd Marijne

6. Ishika Chaudhary
8. Nikki Pradhan
9. Bichu Devi Kharibam (GK)
11. Savita Punia (GK)
12. Shilpi Dabas
20. Lalremsiami
21. Deepika Soreng
22. Baljeet Kaur
23. Ishika
24. Jyoti Rumavat
25. Navneet Kaur
27. Sushila Chanu Pukhrambam
29. Sunelita Toppo
30. Salima Tete (C)
32. Neha
35. Rutuja Pisal
37. Lalthantluangi
39. Sakshi Rana
52. Beauty Dungdung
55. Deepika

=== Indonesia ===
The following is the Indonesia roster in the women's field hockey tournament of the 2026 Asian Games.

Head coach: (Malaysia) Iman Gobinathan

1. Greschela (GK)
2. Sri Rahayu
5. Natasya Naiborhu
6. Dea Destian
7. Lispa
8. Salma Maulani
9. Asri Dewi Prasasti
10. Bernika Mersella
11. Lily Pasaribu
12. Desi Wardani
13. Innes Aditiya
14. Nisa Indira (C)
15. Rasgita
18. Selly Florentina (GK)
19. Erika Kbarek
20. Azlia Richa
22. Fatma Hapsari
28. Keyssa Vinynda

=== Japan ===
The following is the Japan roster in the women's field hockey tournament of the 2026 Asian Games.

Head Coach: (Japan) Akira Takahashi

1. Akio Tanaka (GK)
2. Miyu Suzuki
3. Ikumi Matsu
4. Hanami Saito
5. Nanako Tateiwa
6. Emi Nishikori
7. Mayuri Horikawa
8. Shiho Kobayakawa
9. Mai Toriyama
10. Amiru Shimada
11. Akari Nakagomi
13. Hiroka Murayama
16. Saki Tanaka
17. Miyu Hasegawa
18. Yu Kudo (GK, C)
19. Maho Ueno
21. Rui Takashima
23. Maho Segawa
25. Haruka Kawaguchi
27. Nanami Kaneko

=== Singapore ===
The following is the Singapore roster in the women's field hockey tournament of the 2026 Asian Games.

Head Coach: (Singapore) Henry Wong

1. Taylor Liu (GK)
4. Ally Zuraiddy
5. Jolene Ng
6. Tiffany Ong
7. Xiao Qian Kwek
8. Phylicia Tanandika
9. Nadiah Kie Hwee Ong
11. Puay Ho
12. Chloe Loh
14. Li Min Toh
15. Dayana Ong
17. Cheryll Chia
18. Felissa Lai (GK)
20. Sardonna Ng (C)
21. Wei Lin Chan
22. Valerie Tay
23. Elliea Rizal
24. Ivy Chan
28. Cindy Ong
77. Valerie Sim (C)

=== Thailand ===
The following is the Thailand roster in the women's field hockey tournament of the 2026 Asian Games.

Head Coach: (South Korea) Young Wook Bae

3. Kaewkan Promma
4. Suwapat Konthong
6. Wananchaporn Kammoon
7. Kunjira Inpa
8. Sudarat Noo-Keaw
9. Arucha Komolwit
10. Thanaphon Khamnon
11. Trinetr Jirapitsatja
13. Supansa Samanso
14. Sawita Kakkaeo
15. Songkran Pasawat (C)
17. Nadia Smeelen
18. Siraya Yimkrajang (GK)
20. Watsana Saetan (GK)
21. Kwanruedee Saoyod
22. Kornkanok Waeojingrit
23. Pattheera Tasaeng
26. Wooju Jeong
28. Voramon Inthanaphichit
33. Ariya Mock

=== Uzbekistan ===
The following is the Uzbekistan roster in the women's field hockey tournament of the 2026 Asian Games.

Head Coach:

1. Rushana Chorieva (GK)
2. Ugiloy Fakhriddinova
3. Irina Semyonova (C)
6. Mutabar Amrieva
7. Madinabonu Khujaeva
8. Zulkhumor Khaydarova
9. Fotima Abduganieva
10. Mariya Demina
11. Parvina Fayzillaeva
12. Zulfiyakhon Khaytboeva
13. Yuliya Yubko
15. Shahzoda Zaripova
16. Marjona Mamatmurodova
17. Mekhrangiz Abdugaforova
19. Noilakhon Khakimova
44. Aziza Akhmedova (GK)
66. Nurkhayot Odilova
77. Roziyakhon Soyibjonova
