= Field hockey at the 2024 Summer Olympics =

Field hockey at the Games of the XXXIII Olympiad
- Venue: Stade Yves-du-Manoir
- Dates: 27 July – 9 August 2024
- No. of events: 2 (1 men, 1 women)
- Competitors: 384 from 15 nations

The field hockey tournaments at the 2024 Summer Olympics in Paris were held from 27 July to 9 August at Stade Yves-du-Manoir, a legacy venue of the 1924 Summer Olympics. Twenty-four teams (twelve each for men and women) competed against each other in their respective tournaments.

== Qualification ==
The International Olympic Committee and the International Hockey Federation (FIH) had ratified and released the qualification criteria for Paris 2024 on 30 March 2022. Each of the continental champions from five confederations (Africa, Americas, Asia, Europe, and Oceania) secured the men's and women's spots for their respective NOC, whereas host nation France received a direct quota place each in the men's and women's tournament after they have attained the top twenty-five spot or higher in the FIH world ranking list.

The remainder of the quota places was attributed to the eligible NOCs with a substantial ranking through two separate FIH Olympic qualifying tournaments. The top three squads at the end of each tournament secured the berths to complete the twelve-team field for Paris 2024. If the French hockey players had won the 2023 EuroHockey Championships, the number of places in two wildcard tournaments would have risen to seven, with the remaining spot offered to the highest-ranked of the two bronze medal losers.

=== Qualification summary ===
| Nation | Men's | Women's | Athletes |
|---|---|---|---|
| Argentina | Yes | Yes | 32 |
| Australia | Yes | Yes | 32 |
| Belgium | Yes | Yes | 32 |
| China | | Yes | 16 |
| France | Yes | Yes | 32 |
| Germany | Yes | Yes | 32 |
| Great Britain | Yes | Yes | 32 |
| India | Yes | | 16 |
| Ireland | Yes | | 16 |
| Japan | | Yes | 16 |
| Netherlands | Yes | Yes | 32 |
| New Zealand | Yes | | 16 |
| South Africa | Yes | Yes | 32 |
| Spain | Yes | Yes | 32 |
| United States | | Yes | 16 |
| Total: 15 NOCs | 192 | 192 | 384 |

=== Men's qualification ===
| Qualification | Date | Host/Country | Berths | Qualified team |
|---|---|---|---|---|
| Host country | — | | 1 | France |
| 2023 Oceania Cup | 10–13 August 2023 | Whangārei | 1 | Australia |
| 2023 EuroHockey Championship | 19–27 August 2023 | Mönchengladbach | 1 | Netherlands |
| 2022 Asian Games | 24 September − 6 October 2023 | Hangzhou | 1 | India |
| 2023 Pan American Games | 25 October – 3 November 2023 | Santiago | 1 | Argentina |
| 2023 African Olympic Qualifier | 29 October – 5 November 2023 | Pretoria | 1 | South Africa |
| 2024 FIH Hockey Olympic Qualifiers | 13–21 January 2024 | Valencia | 3 | Belgium; Spain; Ireland |
| 2024 FIH Hockey Olympic Qualifiers | 13–21 January 2024 | Muscat | 3 | Germany; Great Britain; New Zealand |
| Total | | | 12 | |

=== Women's qualification ===
| Qualification | Date | Host/Country | Berths | Qualified team |
|---|---|---|---|---|
| Host country | — | | 1 | France |
| 2023 Oceania Cup | 10–13 August 2023 | Whangārei | 1 | Australia |
| 2023 EuroHockey Championship | 18–26 August 2023 | Mönchengladbach | 1 | Netherlands |
| 2022 Asian Games | 25 September − 7 October 2023 | Hangzhou | 1 | China |
| 2023 Pan American Games | 26 October – 4 November 2023 | Santiago | 1 | Argentina |
| 2023 African Olympic Qualifier | 29 October – 5 November 2023 | Pretoria | 1 | South Africa |
| 2024 FIH Hockey Olympic Qualifiers | 13–20 January 2024 | Ranchi | 3 | Germany; United States; Japan |
| 2024 FIH Hockey Olympic Qualifiers | 13–20 January 2024 | Valencia | 3 | Belgium; Spain; Great Britain |
| Total | | | 12 | |

== Medal summary ==
=== Medal table ===
* Host nation (France)

| Rank | Nation | Gold | Silver | Bronze | Total |
|---|---|---|---|---|---|
| 1 | Netherlands | 2 | 0 | 0 | 2 |
| 2 | China | 0 | 1 | 0 | 1 |
| 2 | Germany | 0 | 1 | 0 | 1 |
| 4 | Argentina | 0 | 0 | 1 | 1 |
| 4 | India | 0 | 0 | 1 | 1 |
| Totals (5 entries) | | 2 | 2 | 2 | 6 |

=== Medalists ===
| Event | Gold | Silver | Bronze |
|---|---|---|---|
| Men | Netherlands; Thierry Brinkman; Jip Janssen; Lars Balk; Jonas de Geus; Thijs van Dam; Seve van Ass; Jorrit Croon; Justen Blok; Derck de Vilder; Floris Wortelboer; Tjep Hoedemakers; Koen Bijen; Joep de Mol; Pirmin Blaak; Tijmen Reyenga; Duco Telgenkamp; Floris Middendorp; Steijn van Heijningen | Germany; Mats Grambusch; Mathias Müller; Lukas Windfeder; Niklas Wellen; Johannes Große; Thies Prinz; Paul-Philipp Kaufmann; Teo Hinrichs; Tom Grambusch; Gonzalo Peillat; Christopher Rühr; Justus Weigand; Marco Miltkau; Martin Zwicker; Hannes Müller; Malte Hellwig; Moritz Ludwig; Jean Danneberg | India; Harmanpreet Singh; Jarmanpreet Singh; Abhishek Nain; Manpreet Singh; Hardik Singh; Gurjant Singh; Sanjay Rana; Mandeep Singh; Lalit Upadhyay; P. R. Sreejesh; Sumit Walmiki; Shamsher Singh; Raj Kumar Pal; Amit Rohidas; Vivek Prasad; Sukhjeet Singh |
| Women | Netherlands; Xan de Waard; Anne Veenendaal; Luna Fokke; Freeke Moes; Lisa Post; Yibbi Jansen; Renée van Laarhoven; Felice Albers; Maria Verschoor; Sanne Koolen; Frédérique Matla; Joosje Burg; Marleen Jochems; Pien Sanders; Marijn Veen; Laura Nunnink; Pien Dicke | China; Ou Zixia; Ye Jiao; Gu Bingfeng; Yang Liu; Zhang Ying; Chen Yi; Ma Ning; Li Hong; Dan Wen; Zou Meirong; He Jiangxin; Fan Yunxia; Chen Yang; Xu Wenyu; Zhong Jiaqi; Tan Jinzhuang; Yu Anhui | Argentina; Rocío Sánchez Moccia; Sofía Toccalino; Agustina Gorzelany; Valentina Raposo; Agostina Alonso; Agustina Albertario; María José Granatto; Cristina Cosentino; Victoria Sauze; Sofía Cairó; Eugenia Trinchinetti; Lara Casas; Juana Castellaro; Pilar Campoy; Julieta Jankunas; Zoe Díaz |

== Men's tournament ==
=== Group stage ===
==== Group A ====
| Pos | Team | Pld | W | D | L | GF | GA | GD | Pts | Qualification |
|---|---|---|---|---|---|---|---|---|---|---|
| 1 | Germany | 5 | 4 | 0 | 1 | 16 | 6 | +10 | 12 | Advance to quarter-finals |
| 2 | Netherlands | 5 | 3 | 1 | 1 | 16 | 9 | +7 | 10 | Advance to quarter-finals |
| 3 | Great Britain | 5 | 2 | 2 | 1 | 11 | 7 | +4 | 8 | Advance to quarter-finals |
| 4 | Spain | 5 | 2 | 1 | 2 | 11 | 12 | −1 | 7 | Advance to quarter-finals |
| 5 | South Africa | 5 | 1 | 1 | 3 | 11 | 17 | −6 | 4 | |
| 6 | France (H) | 5 | 0 | 1 | 4 | 8 | 22 | −14 | 1 | |

Source: FIH
Rules for classification: 1) points; 2) matches won; 3) goal difference; 4) goals for; 5) head-to-head result; 6) field goals scored.
(H) Hosts

==== Group B ====
| Pos | Team | Pld | W | D | L | GF | GA | GD | Pts | Qualification |
|---|---|---|---|---|---|---|---|---|---|---|
| 1 | Belgium | 5 | 4 | 1 | 0 | 15 | 7 | +8 | 13 | Advance to quarter-finals |
| 2 | India | 5 | 3 | 1 | 1 | 10 | 7 | +3 | 10 | Advance to quarter-finals |
| 3 | Australia | 5 | 3 | 0 | 2 | 12 | 10 | +2 | 9 | Advance to quarter-finals |
| 4 | Argentina | 5 | 2 | 2 | 1 | 8 | 6 | +2 | 8 | Advance to quarter-finals |
| 5 | Ireland | 5 | 1 | 0 | 4 | 4 | 9 | −5 | 3 | |
| 6 | New Zealand | 5 | 0 | 0 | 5 | 4 | 14 | −10 | 0 | |

Source: FIH
Rules for classification: 1) points; 2) matches won; 3) goal difference; 4) goals for; 5) head-to-head result; 6) field goals scored.

=== Knockout stage ===
Quarter-finals
4 August
Germany | 3
Argentina | 2
4 August
India (p.s.o.) | 1 (4)
Great Britain | 1 (2)
4 August
Netherlands | 2
Australia | 0
4 August
Belgium | 2
Spain | 3

Semi-finals
6 August
Germany | 3
India | 2
6 August
Netherlands | 4
Spain | 0

Gold medal match
8 August
Germany | 1 (1)
Netherlands (p.s.o.) | 1 (3)
Bronze medal match
8 August
India | 2
Spain | 1

=== Final standings ===
As per statistical convention in field hockey, matches decided in regular time are counted as wins and losses, while matches decided by penalty shoot-outs are counted as draws.

| Pos | Team | Pld | W | D | L | GF | GA | GD | Pts | Final result |
|---|---|---|---|---|---|---|---|---|---|---|
| 1 | Netherlands | 8 | 5 | 2 | 1 | 23 | 10 | +13 | 17 | Gold medal |
| 2 | Germany | 8 | 6 | 1 | 1 | 23 | 11 | +12 | 19 | Silver medal |
| 3 | India | 8 | 4 | 2 | 2 | 15 | 12 | +3 | 14 | Bronze medal |
| 4 | Spain | 8 | 3 | 1 | 4 | 15 | 20 | −5 | 10 | Fourth place |
| 5 | Belgium | 6 | 4 | 1 | 1 | 17 | 10 | +7 | 13 | Eliminated in quarter-finals |
| 6 | Australia | 6 | 3 | 0 | 3 | 12 | 12 | 0 | 9 | Eliminated in quarter-finals |
| 7 | Great Britain | 6 | 2 | 3 | 1 | 12 | 8 | +4 | 9 | Eliminated in quarter-finals |
| 8 | Argentina | 6 | 2 | 2 | 2 | 10 | 9 | +1 | 8 | Eliminated in quarter-finals |
| 9 | South Africa | 5 | 1 | 1 | 3 | 11 | 17 | −6 | 4 | Eliminated in group stage |
| 10 | Ireland | 5 | 1 | 0 | 4 | 4 | 9 | −5 | 3 | Eliminated in group stage |
| 11 | France (H) | 5 | 0 | 1 | 4 | 8 | 22 | −14 | 1 | Eliminated in group stage |
| 12 | New Zealand | 5 | 0 | 0 | 5 | 4 | 14 | −10 | 0 | Eliminated in group stage |

Source: Olympics
(H) Hosts

== Women's tournament ==
=== Group stage ===
==== Group A ====
| Pos | Team | Pld | W | D | L | GF | GA | GD | Pts | Qualification |
|---|---|---|---|---|---|---|---|---|---|---|
| 1 | Netherlands | 5 | 5 | 0 | 0 | 19 | 5 | +14 | 15 | Quarter-finals |
| 2 | Belgium | 5 | 4 | 0 | 1 | 13 | 4 | +9 | 12 | Quarter-finals |
| 3 | Germany | 5 | 3 | 0 | 2 | 12 | 7 | +5 | 9 | Quarter-finals |
| 4 | China | 5 | 2 | 0 | 3 | 15 | 10 | +5 | 6 | Quarter-finals |
| 5 | Japan | 5 | 1 | 0 | 4 | 2 | 15 | −13 | 3 | |
| 6 | France (H) | 5 | 0 | 0 | 5 | 4 | 24 | −20 | 0 | |

Source: FIH
Rules for classification: 1) points; 2) matches won; 3) goal difference; 4) goals for; 5) head-to-head result; 6) field goals scored.
(H) Hosts

==== Group B ====
| Pos | Team | Pld | W | D | L | GF | GA | GD | Pts | Qualification |
|---|---|---|---|---|---|---|---|---|---|---|
| 1 | Australia | 5 | 4 | 1 | 0 | 15 | 5 | +10 | 13 | Quarter-finals |
| 2 | Argentina | 5 | 4 | 1 | 0 | 16 | 7 | +9 | 13 | Quarter-finals |
| 3 | Spain | 5 | 2 | 1 | 2 | 6 | 7 | −1 | 7 | Quarter-finals |
| 4 | Great Britain | 5 | 2 | 0 | 3 | 8 | 12 | −4 | 6 | Quarter-finals |
| 5 | United States | 5 | 1 | 1 | 3 | 5 | 13 | −8 | 4 | |
| 6 | South Africa | 5 | 0 | 0 | 5 | 4 | 10 | −6 | 0 | |

Source: FIH
Rules for classification: 1) points; 2) matches won; 3) goal difference; 4) goals for; 5) head-to-head result; 6) field goals scored.

=== Knockout stage ===
Quarter-finals
5 August
Netherlands | 3
Great Britain | 1
5 August
Argentina (p.s.o.) | 1 (2)
Germany | 1 (0)
5 August
Belgium | 2
Spain | 0
5 August
Australia | 2
China | 3

Semi-finals
7 August
Netherlands | 3
Argentina | 0
7 August
Belgium | 1 (2)
China (p.s.o.) | 1 (3)

Gold medal match
9 August
Netherlands (p.s.o.) | 1 (3)
China | 1 (1)
Bronze medal match
9 August
Argentina (p.s.o.) | 2 (3)
Belgium | 2 (1)

=== Final standings ===
As per statistical convention in field hockey, matches decided in regular time are counted as wins and losses, while matches decided by penalty shoot-outs are counted as draws.

| Pos | Team | Pld | W | D | L | GF | GA | GD | Pts | Final result |
|---|---|---|---|---|---|---|---|---|---|---|
| 1 | Netherlands | 8 | 7 | 1 | 0 | 26 | 7 | +19 | 22 | Gold medal |
| 2 | China | 8 | 3 | 2 | 3 | 20 | 14 | +6 | 11 | Silver medal |
| 3 | Argentina | 8 | 4 | 3 | 1 | 19 | 13 | +6 | 15 | Bronze medal |
| 4 | Belgium | 8 | 5 | 2 | 1 | 18 | 7 | +11 | 17 | Fourth place |
| 5 | Australia | 6 | 4 | 1 | 1 | 17 | 8 | +9 | 13 | Eliminated in quarter-finals |
| 6 | Germany | 6 | 3 | 1 | 2 | 13 | 8 | +5 | 10 | Eliminated in quarter-finals |
| 7 | Spain | 6 | 2 | 1 | 3 | 6 | 9 | −3 | 7 | Eliminated in quarter-finals |
| 8 | Great Britain | 6 | 2 | 0 | 4 | 9 | 15 | −6 | 6 | Eliminated in quarter-finals |
| 9 | United States | 5 | 1 | 1 | 3 | 5 | 13 | −8 | 4 | Eliminated in group stage |
| 10 | Japan | 5 | 1 | 0 | 4 | 2 | 15 | −13 | 3 | Eliminated in group stage |
| 11 | South Africa | 5 | 0 | 0 | 5 | 4 | 10 | −6 | 0 | Eliminated in group stage |
| 12 | France (H) | 5 | 0 | 0 | 5 | 4 | 24 | −20 | 0 | Eliminated in group stage |

Source: Olympics
(H) Hosts

== See also ==
- Field hockey at the 2022 Asian Games
- Field hockey at the 2023 African Games
- Field hockey at the 2023 Pan American Games
