= 2024 Women's International Festival of Hockey =

Tournament details
- Host country: Australia
- City: Perth
- Dates: 20–28 April
- Teams: 4 (from 2 confederations)
- Venue: Perth Hockey Stadium

Final positions
- Champions: China (1st title)
- Runner-up: Australia
- Third place: Australia Development

Tournament statistics
- Matches played: 12
- Goals scored: 48 (4 per match)
- Top scorer: (China) Chen Yang (4 goals)

The 2024 Women's International Festival of Hockey was the third edition of the International Festival of Hockey. The tournament took place in Perth, Australia, from 20 to 28 April 2024.

The national teams of Australia, China and Japan competed in the tournament, with the addition of a development team from Australia.

China won the tournament, finishing top of the pool at the conclusion of the round-robin tournament. Australia finished in second place, followed by the Australian Development Squad and Japan.

== Participating nations ==
In addition to the three national sides, Australia will field a development team:

Australia

Head Coach: (Australia) Katrina Powell

1. Claire Colwill
2. Ambrosia Malone
3. Brooke Peris (C)
4. Amy Lawton
5. Grace Young
7. Aleisha Power (GK)
8. Maddison Brooks
11. Alice Arnott
12. Greta Hayes
13. Harriet Shand
14. Stephanie Kershaw
15. Kaitlin Nobbs (C)
17. Lucy Sharman
18. Jane Claxton (C)
19. Jocelyn Bartram (GK)
20. Karri Somerville
21. Renee Taylor
24. Mariah Williams
29. Rebecca Greiner
44. Abigail Wilson
Australia Development

Head Coach: (Australia) Hugh Purvis

1. Ruby Harris
2. Morgan Mathison (C)
3. Sarah Byrnes
4. Jesse Reid
5. Alana Kavanagh
6. Dayle Dolkens
6. Jade Smith
7. Hannah Cullum-Sanders
8. Kendra Fitzpatrick
9. Olivia Downes
10. Maddison Smith (C)
11. Casey Dolkens
12. Josie Lawton
13. Neasa Flynn
14. Abigail Wilson (C)
15. Phillipa Morgan
16. Aisling Utri
26. Rene Hunter (GK)
41. Zoe Newman (GK)
China

Head Coach: (Australia) Alyson Annan

1. Ye Jiao (GK)
2. Gu Bingfeng
3. Yang Liu
6. Zhang Ying
7. Chen Yi
9. Ma Ning
12. Huang Haiyan
13. Li Hong
16. Ou Zixia (C)
17. Dan Wen
18. Zou Meirong
19. Zhang Xiaoxue
20. He Jiangxin
21. Zheng Jiali
22. Zhou You
23. Fan Yunxia
26. Chen Yang
27. Xu Wenyu
29. Liu Ping (GK)
31. Zhong Jiaqi
32. Li Xinhuan (GK)
35. Tan Jinzhuang
36. Liu Chencheng
52. Yuan Meng
54. Liu Tangjie
58. Yu Anhui
Japan

Head Coach: (India) Jude Menezes

1. Eika Nakamura (GK)
5. Yu Asai
7. Miyu Suzuki
9. Yuri Nagai (C)
10. Hazuki Nagai
11. Shihori Oikawa
13. Miki Kozuka
15. Chiko Fujibayashi
16. Akari Nakagomi
17. Shiho Kobayakawa
19. Kanon Mori
21. Mai Toriyama
23. Saki Tanaka
25. Kana Urata
26. Amiru Shimada
27. Akio Tanaka (GK)
28. Rui Takashima
29. Sakurako Omoto
32. Junon Kawai
33. Aimi Kobayashi
36. Miyu Hasegawa
37. Rika Ogawa

== Officials ==
The following umpires were appointed by Hockey Australia and the FIH to officiate the tournament:

- Nathan Jennings (AUS)
- Daniel Johnston (AUS)
- Tamara Leonard (AUS)
- Jordan Moore (AUS)
- Rhiannon Murrie (AUS)
- Aleisha Neumann (AUS)
- Nicola Ogden (AUS)
- Tamara Standley (AUS)
- Cookie Tan (SGP)

== Results ==
All times are local (AWST).

=== Standings ===
Pos	Team	Pld	W	D	L	GF	GA	GD	Pts	Result
1	China	6	4	2	0	20	8	+12	14	Tournament Champion
2	Australia (H)	6	4	1	1	15	6	+9	13	
3	Australia Development	6	1	1	4	8	18	−10	4	
4	Japan	6	1	0	5	5	16	−11	3	

Source: FIH
Rules for classification: 1) points; 2) matches won; 3) goal difference; 4) goals for; 5) head-to-head result; 6) field goals scored.
(H) Hosts

=== Fixtures ===
20 April 2024
14:40

China	5–1	Australia Development
Gu 8'; Huang 19'; Yang 32'; Zhou 33'; He 40'	Report	Downes 12'

Umpires:
Tamara Leonard (AUS)
Rhiannon Murrie (AUS)

20 April 2024
16:40

Australia	1–0	Japan
Williams 60'	Report

Umpires:
Cookie Tan (SGP)
Aleisha Neumann (AUS)

21 April 2024
14:40

Japan	3–2	Australia Development
Takashima 12', 17'; Oikawa 45'	Report	M. Smith 18'; Flynn 21'

Umpires:
Tamara Leonard (AUS)
Cookie Tan (SGP)

21 April 2024
16:40

China	2–2	Australia
Zou 22'; Chen Ya. 22'	Report	Hayes 38'; Kershaw 53'

Umpires:
Aleisha Neumann (AUS)
Rhiannon Murrie (AUS)

23 April 2024
15:10

Australia Development	0–4	Australia
	Report	Williams 35'; Malone 50'; Brooks 58'; Colwill 60+'

Umpires:
Aleisha Neumann (AUS)
Tamara Leonard (AUS)

23 April 2024
17:40

Japan	0–4	China
	Report	Ou 9'; Zhang Y. 39'; Yu 55'; Huang 58'

Umpires:
Tamara Standley (AUS)
Nicola Ogden (AUS)

24 April 2024
15:10

Australia Development	2–1	Japan
Downes 27'; Cullum-Sanders 32'	Report	Mori 55'

Umpires:
Rhiannon Murrie (AUS)
Aleisha Neumann (AUS)

24 April 2024
17:40

Australia	2–3	China
Malone 16'; Brooks 18'	Report	Chen Yi 15'; Chen Ya. 46'; Zou 58'

Umpires:
Cookie Tan (SGP)
Tamara Leonard (AUS)

27 April 2024
14:40

Australia	3–1	Australia Development
Hayes 4'; Peris 42'; Somerville 52'	Report	Wilson 29'

Umpires:
Rhiannon Murrie (AUS)
Cookie Tan (SGP)

27 April 2024
16:40

China	4–1	Japan
Gu 13', 52'; Chen Ya. 41', 42'	Report	Suzuki 29'

Umpires:
Aleisha Neumann (AUS)
Tamara Leonard (AUS)

28 April 2024
14:40

Australia Development	2–2	China
Wilson 45'; Cullum-Sanders 57'	Report	Dan 25'; Zou 60'

Umpires:
Cookie Tan (SGP)
Aleisha Neumann (AUS)

28 April 2024
16:40

Japan	0–3	Australia
	Report	Colwill 12'; Malone 42'; Brooks 51'

Umpires:
Tamara Leonard (AUS)
Rhiannon Murrie (AUS)

== Goalscorers ==
There were 48 goals scored in 12 matches, for an average of 4 goals per match.

4 goals

- (China) Chen Yang

3 goals

- (Australia) Maddison Brooks
- (Australia) Ambrosia Malone
- (China) Gu Bingfeng
- (China) Zou Meirong

2 goals

- (Australia) Claire Colwill
- (Australia) Hannah Cullum-Sanders
- (Australia) Olivia Downes
- (Australia) Greta Hayes
- (Australia) Mariah Williams
- (Australia) Abigail Wilson
- (China) Huang Haiyan
- (Japan) Rui Takashima

1 goal

- (Australia) Neasa Flynn
- (Australia) Stephanie Kershaw
- (Australia) Brooke Peris
- (Australia) Maddison Smith
- (Australia) Karri Somerville
- (China) Yu Anhui
- (China) He Jiangxin
- (China) Yang Liu
- (China) Dan Wen
- (China) Chen Yi
- (China) Zhang Ying
- (China) Zhou Yu
- (China) Ou Zixia
- (Japan) Kanon Mori
- (Japan) Shihori Oikawa
- (Japan) Miyu Suzuki

Source: FIH and Hockey Australia
