= 2023 Women's Asian Champions Trophy =

International field hockey tournament in India

Tournament details
- Host country: India
- City: Ranchi
- Dates: 27 October – 5 November
- Teams: 6 (from 1 confederation)
- Venue: Jaipal Singh Stadium

Final positions
- Champions: India (2nd title)
- Runner-up: Japan
- Third place: China

Tournament statistics
- Matches played: 20
- Goals scored: 67 (3.35 per match)
- Top scorer: (China) Zhong Jiaqi (7 goals)

The 2023 Women's Asian Champions Trophy was the seventh edition of the Women's Asian Champions Trophy, a biennial field hockey tournament for the six best Asian women's national teams organized by the Asian Hockey Federation.

The tournament was held at the Jaipal Singh Stadium in Ranchi, India and was held from 27 October to 5 November 2023. Japan were the defending champions.

The tournament overall was won by India, winning its second title

== Teams ==
The following six teams will be participating in the tournament.

| Team | Appearance | Last appearance | Previous best performance |
|---|---|---|---|
| China | 7th | 2021 | 2nd (2011, 2016) |
| India | 6th | 2018 | 1st (2016) |
| Japan | 7th | 2021 | 1st (2013, 2021) |
| South Korea | 6th | 2021 | 1st (2010, 2011, 2018) |
| Malaysia | 4th | 2018 | 3rd (2013) |
| Thailand | 2nd | 2021 | 4th (2021) |

== Round robin ==
All times are (UTC+05:30)

=== Standings ===
| Pos | Team | Pld | W | D | L | GF | GA | GD | Pts | Qualification |
|---|---|---|---|---|---|---|---|---|---|---|
| 1 | India (H) | 5 | 5 | 0 | 0 | 21 | 3 | +18 | 15 | Semi-finals |
| 2 | China | 5 | 3 | 0 | 2 | 12 | 3 | +9 | 9 | Semi-finals |
| 3 | Japan | 5 | 3 | 0 | 2 | 12 | 3 | +9 | 9 | Semi-finals |
| 4 | South Korea | 5 | 2 | 1 | 2 | 5 | 10 | −5 | 7 | Semi-finals |
| 5 | Malaysia | 5 | 1 | 1 | 3 | 3 | 13 | −10 | 4 | Fifth place match |
| 6 | Thailand | 5 | 0 | 0 | 5 | 1 | 22 | −21 | 0 | Fifth place match |

Source: FIH
Rules for classification: 1) points; 2) goal difference; 3) goals scored; 4) head-to-head result.
(H) Hosts

=== Results ===
27 October 2023
16:00

| Japan | 3–0 | Malaysia |
|---|---|---|
| Ogawa 13'; Toriyama 43'; Kobayakawa 54' | Report |

Umpires:
Kim Yoon Seon (KOR)
Yogita Pasi (IND)

27 October 2023
18:15

| China | 0–1 | South Korea |
|---|---|---|
| | Report | An 18' |

Umpires:
Kamile Mockaityte (LTU)
Sheena Hori (JPN)

27 October 2023
20:30

| India | 7–1 | Thailand |
|---|---|---|
| Monika 7'; Salima 15'; Sangita 29', 45', 45'; Deepika 40'; Lalremsiami 52' | Report | Samanso 22' |

Umpires:
Norasyikin Shariudin (MAS)
Valerie Koh (SGP)

28 October 2023
16:00

| Japan | 4–0 | South Korea |
|---|---|---|
| Kobayashi 7'; Y. Nagai 15'; Hasegawa 19'; Toriyama 49' | Report |

Umpires:
Yao Liu (CHN)
Kamile Mockaityte (LTU)

28 October 2023
18:15

| Thailand | 0–6 | China |
|---|---|---|
| | Report | Zhong 10', 42', 51'; Ma 30'; Ou 50'; Dan 57' |

Umpires:
Rama Potnis (IND)
Kim Yoon Seon (KOR)

28 October 2023
20:30

| India | 5–0 | Malaysia |
|---|---|---|
| Vandana 7', 21'; Sangita 28'; Lalremsiami 28'; Jyoti 38' | Report |

Umpires:
Valerie Koh (SGP)
Jureporn Oimmak (THA)

30 October 2023
16:00

| South Korea | 1–1 | Malaysia |
|---|---|---|
| Seo 35' | Report | Azhar 58' |

Umpires:
Rama Potnis (IND)
Jureporn Oimmak (THA)

30 October 2023
18:15

| Thailand | 0–4 | Japan |
|---|---|---|
| | Report | Toriyama 29'; Y. Nagai 34'; Urata 35'; Fujibayashi 50' |

Umpires:
Liu Yao (CHN)
Yogita Pasi (IND)

30 October 2023
20:30

| China | 1–2 | India |
|---|---|---|
| Zhong 41' | Report | Deepika 15'; Salima 26' |

Umpires:
Liu Yao (CHN)
Yogita Pasi (IND)

31 October 2023
16:00

| South Korea | 3–0 | Thailand |
|---|---|---|
| Lee 24'; Jung 30'; Park 32' | Report |

Umpires:
Norasyikin Shariudin (MAS)
Sheena Hori (JPN)

31 October 2023
18:15

| Malaysia | 0–4 | China |
|---|---|---|
| | Report | Zhong 16', 30', 51'; Zou 22' |

Umpires:
Jureporn Oimmak (THA)
Yogita Pasi (IND)

31 October 2023
20:30

| Japan | 1–2 | India |
|---|---|---|
| Urata 37' | Report | Navneet 31'; Sangita 47' |

Umpires:
Kamile Mockaityte (LTU)
Valerie Koh (SGP)

2 November 2023
16:00

| Malaysia | 2–0 | Thailand |
|---|---|---|
| Mohammed 25'; Yussaini 52' | Report |

Umpires:
Yogita Pasi (IND)
Sheena Hori (JPN)

2 November 2023
18:15

| China | 1–0 | Japan |
|---|---|---|
| Gu 8' | Report |

Umpires:
Kim Yoon Seon (KOR)
Rama Potnis (IND)

2 November 2023
20:30

| India | 5–0 | South Korea |
|---|---|---|
| Salima 6', 36'; Navneet 36'; Vandana 49'; Neha 60' | Report |

Umpires:
Kamile Mockaityte (LTU)
Liu Yao (CHN)

== Fifth place game ==
4 November 2023
15:30

| Malaysia | 1–0 | Thailand |
|---|---|---|
| Syafi 1' | Report |

Umpires:
Valerie Koh (SGP)
Sheena Hori (JPN)

== First to fourth place classification ==
=== Bracket ===
Semi-finals
4 November
China | 1
Japan | 2
4 November
India | 2
South Korea | 0

Final
5 November
Japan | 0
India | 4
Third place
5 November
China | 2
South Korea | 1

=== Semi-finals ===
4 November 2023
18:00

| China | 1–2 | Japan |
|---|---|---|
| Luo 11' | Report | Urata 34'; Suzuki 44' |

Umpires:
Kim Yoon Seon (KOR)
Kamile Mockaityte (LTU)

4 November 2023
20:30

| India | 2–0 | South Korea |
|---|---|---|
| Salima 11'; Vaishnavi 19' | Report |

Umpires:
Liu Yao (CHN)
Norasyikin Shariudin (MAS)

=== Third place game ===
5 November 2023
18:00

| China | 2–1 | South Korea |
|---|---|---|
| Chen 3'; Luo 47' | Report | An 38' |

Umpires:
Kamile Mockaityte (LTU)
Rama Potnis (IND)

=== Final ===
5 November 2023
20:30

| Japan | 0–4 | India |
|---|---|---|
| | Report | Sangita 17'; Neha 46'; Lalremsiami 57'; Vandana 60' |

Umpires:
Kim Yoon Seon (KOR)
Liu Yao (CHN)

== Goalscorers ==
There were 67 goals scored in 20 matches, for an average of 3.35 goals per match.

7 goals

- (China) Zhong Jiaqi

6 goals

- (India) Sangita Kumari

5 goals

- (India) Salima Tete

4 goals

- (India) Vandana Katariya

3 goals

- (India) Lalremsiami Hmarzote
- (Japan) Mai Toriyama
- (Japan) Kana Urata

2 goals

- (China) Luo Tiantian
- (India) Neha Goyal
- (India) Navneet Kaur
- (India) Deepika Sehrawat
- (Japan) Yuri Nagai
- (South Korea) An Su-jin

1 goal

- (China) Chen Yi
- (China) Dan Wen
- (China) Gu Bingfeng
- (China) Ma Ning
- (China) Ou Zixia
- (China) Zou Meirong
- (India) Monika Malik
- (India) Vaishnavi Phalke
- (India) Jyoti Rumawat
- (Japan) Chiko Fujibayashi
- (Japan) Miyu Hasegawa
- (Japan) Shiho Kobayakawa
- (Japan) Aimi Kobayashi
- (Japan) Rika Ogawa
- (Japan) Miyu Suzuki
- (Malaysia) Nur Mohammed
- (Malaysia) Azhar Nur
- (Malaysia) Nurmaizatul Syafi
- (Malaysia) Nur Yussaini
- (South Korea) Jung Che-young
- (South Korea) Park Seung-ae
- (South Korea) Seo Su-young
- (South Korea) Lee Yu-jin
- (Thailand) Supansa Samanso

Source: FIH

== See also ==
- 2023 Men's Asian Champions Trophy
- Field hockey at the 2022 Asian Games – Women's tournament
