= China women's national field hockey team =

China
- Nickname(s): 冰山雪莲; Xuělián (The Snow Lotuses)
- Association: Chinese Hockey Association
- Confederation: AHF (Asia)
- Head Coach: Alyson Annan
- Assistant coach(es): Huang Yongsheng; Adrian Lock; Liu Pan; Tao Zhinan
- Manager: Liu Pan
- Captain: Ou Zixia
Home	Away

FIH ranking
- Current: 4 (3 October 2026)

Olympic Games
- Appearances: 7 (first in 2000)
- Best result: (silver) 2nd (2008, 2024)

World Cup
- Appearances: 10 (first in 1990)
- Best result: (bronze) 3rd (2002)

Asian Games
- Appearances: 10 (first in 1990)
- Best result: (gold) 1st (2002, 2006, 2010, 2022)

Asia Cup
- Appearances: 10 (first in 1989)
- Best result: (gold) 1st (1989, 2009, 2025)
Medal record
Event	1st	2nd	3rd
Olympic Games	0	2	0
World Cup	0	0	1
Asian Games	4	3	3
Asia Cup	3	2	3
Champions Trophy	1	2	1
Asian Champions Trophy	0	3	3
Total	8	12	11
Olympic Games
Silver medal – second place	2008 Beijing	Team
Silver medal – second place	2024 Paris	Team
World Cup
Bronze medal – third place	2002 Perth	
Asian Games
Gold medal – first place	2002 Busan	Team
Gold medal – first place	2006 Doha	Team
Gold medal – first place	2010 Guangzhou	Team
Gold medal – first place	2022 Hangzhou	Team
Silver medal – second place	1990 Beijing	Team
Silver medal – second place	2014 Incheon	Team
Silver medal – second place	2026 Aichi-Nagoya	Team
Bronze medal – third place	1994 Hiroshima	Team
Bronze medal – third place	1998 Bangkok	Team
Bronze medal – third place	2018 Jakarta & Palambang	Team
Asia Cup
Gold medal – first place	1989 Hong Kong	
Gold medal – first place	2009 Bangkok	
Gold medal – first place	2025 Hangzhou	
Silver medal – second place	1993 Hiroshima	
Silver medal – second place	2017 Kakamigahara	
Bronze medal – third place	1999 New Delhi	
Bronze medal – third place	2004 New Delhi	
Silver medal – second place	2007 Hong Kong	
Champions Trophy
Gold medal – first place	2002 Macau	
Silver medal – second place	2003 Sydney	
Silver medal – second place	2006 Amstelveen	
Bronze medal – third place	2005 Canberra	
Asian Champions Trophy
Silver medal – second place	2011 Ordos	
Silver medal – second place	2016 Singapore	
Silver medal – second place	2024 Rajgir	
Bronze medal – third place	2018 Donghae	
Bronze medal – third place	2021 Donghae	
Bronze medal – third place	2023 Ranchi	

The China women's national field hockey team (Chinese: 中国国家女子曲棍球队; pinyin: Zhōngguó Guójiā Nǚzǐ Qūgùnqiú Duì) represents the People's Republic of China. The team won silver at the 2008 Summer Olympics in Beijing and secured a medal at the 2024 Summer Olympics in Paris, as well as bronze at the 2002 Hockey World Cup in Perth, Australia. Also, the team won the 2002 Hockey Champions Trophy and finished second in 2004 and 2006.

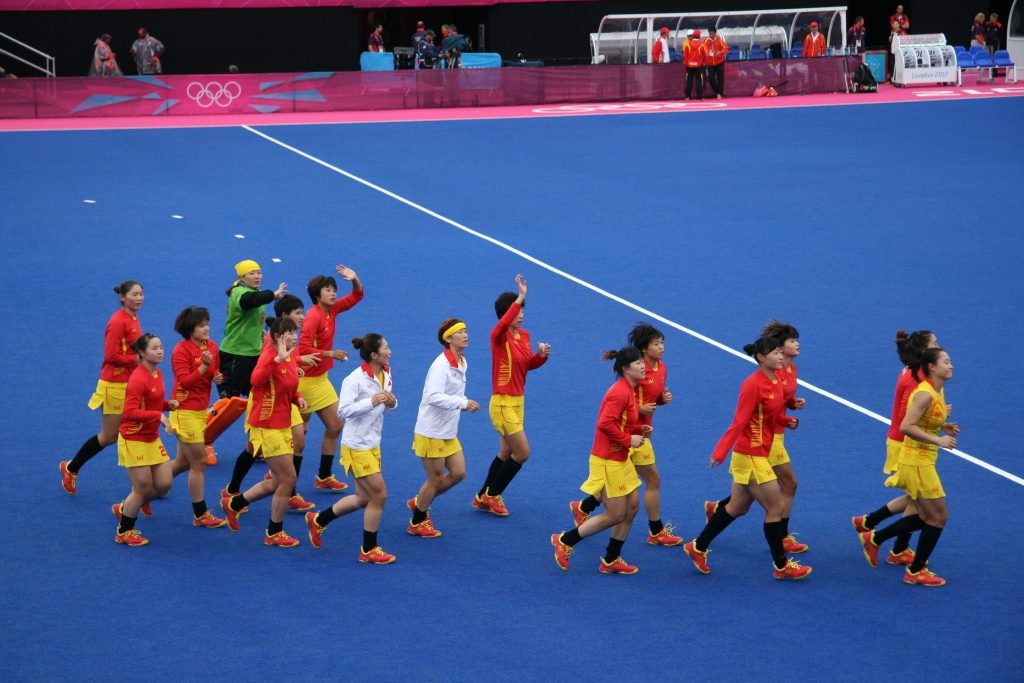
China women's national field hockey team, after drawing with Belgium (0–0) at Riverbank Arena – London 2012 Summer Olympics

== Tournament history ==
=== Summer Olympics ===
- 2000 – 5th place
- 2004 – 4th place
- 2008 – (silver)
- 2012 – 6th place
- 2016 – 9th place
- 2020 – 9th place
- 2024 – (silver)

=== World Cup ===
World Cup
Year	Host city	Position
1990	Sydney, Australia	6th
1994	(Republic of Ireland) Dublin, Ireland	7th
1998	Utrecht, Netherlands	11th
2002	Perth, Australia	3rd
2006	Madrid, Spain	10th
2010	Rosario, Argentina	8th
2014	The Hague, Netherlands	6th
2018	London, England	16th
2022	Amstelveen, Netherlands; Terrassa, Spain	9th
2026	Wavre, Belgium; Amstelveen, Netherlands	8th

=== World League ===
- 2012–13 – 6th place
- 2014–15 – 4th place
- 2016–17 – 8th place

=== Pro League ===
- 2019 – 7th place
- 2020–21 – 8th place
- 2021–22 – 8th place
- 2022–23 – 7th place
- 2023–24 – 5th place
- 2024–25 – 4th place
- 2025–26 – 4th place

=== Champions Trophy ===
- 2001 – 4th place
- 2002 – (gold)
- 2003 – (silver)
- 2004 – 5th place
- 2005 – (bronze)
- 2006 – (silver)
- 2008 – 4th place
- 2010 – 6th place
- 2011 – 7th place
- 2012 – 8th place
- 2014 – 6th place
- 2018 – 4th place

=== Champions Challenge ===
- 2007 – (gold)

=== Asian Games ===
- 1990 – (silver)
- 1994 – (bronze)
- 1998 – (bronze)
- 2002 – (gold)
- 2006 – (gold)
- 2010 – (gold)
- 2014 – (silver)
- 2018 – (bronze)
- 2022 – (gold)
- 2026 – (silver)

=== Asia Cup ===
- 1989 – (gold)
- 1993 – (silver)
- 1999 – (bronze)
- 2004 – (bronze)
- 2007 – (bronze)
- 2009 – (gold)
- 2013 – 4th place
- 2017 – (silver)
- 2022 – 4th place
- 2025 – (gold)

=== Asian Champions Trophy ===
- 2010 – 4th place
- 2011 – (silver)
- 2013 – 4th place
- 2016 – (silver)
- 2018 – (bronze)
- 2021 – (bronze)
- 2023 – (bronze)
- 2024 – (silver)
- 2026 – Qualified

== Current squad ==
Roster for the 2026 Women's FIH Hockey World Cup.

Head coach: Alyson Annan

3. Yang Liu
6. Zhang Ying
7. Chen Yi
9. Ma Ning
10. Zhong Jiaqi
11. Dan Wen
13. Li Hong
16. Ou Zixia (C)
17. Peng Yang
18. Zou Meirong
20. He Jiangxin
23. Fan Yunxia
26. Chen Yang
29. Liu Ping (GK)
35. Tan Jinzhuang
36. Liu Chencheng
50. Li Tong (GK)
53. Chen Tong
58. Yu Anhui
64. Luo Yaxi

== Results and fixtures ==
The following is a list of match results in the last 12 months, as well as any future matches that have been scheduled.

Win Draw Loss Fixture

=== 2026 ===
5 February 2026 2025–26 Women's FIH Pro League	China	0–3	Netherlands	Yunfu, China
19:30		Report	Matla 26', 41'; Jansen 57'	Stadium: Yunfu Education Park Hockey Field

7 February 2026 2025–26 Women's FIH Pro League	China	3–2	England	Yunfu, China
17:00	Ma 53'; Hao 53'; Fan 57'	Report	Howard 34', 44'	Stadium: Yunfu Education Park Hockey Field

8 February 2026 2025–26 Women's FIH Pro League	China	1–6	Netherlands	Yunfu, China
17:00	Feng 58'	Report	Albers 8', 56'; Matla 13'; Veen 35', 52'; Jansen 47'	Stadium: Yunfu Education Park Hockey Field

10 February 2026 2025–26 Women's FIH Pro League	China	0–2	England	Yunfu, China
19:30		Report	Balsdon 8'; Howard 51'	Stadium: Yunfu Education Park Hockey Field

21 February 2026 2025–26 Women's FIH Pro League	China	3–0	Spain	Hobart, Australia
15:30	Ma 3', 15'; Yu 21'	Report		Stadium: Tasmanian Hockey Centre

22 February 2026 2025–26 Women's FIH Pro League	Australia	1–3	China	Hobart, Australia
18:30	Cullum-Sanders 48'	Report	Wang 11'; Zeng 23'; Zhang 27'	Stadium: Tasmanian Hockey Centre

24 February 2026 2025–26 Women's FIH Pro League	Spain	2–2 (3–4 p)	China	Hobart, Australia
18:30	Mejías 4'; Álvarez 40'	Report	Zhang 21', 32'	Stadium: Tasmanian Hockey Centre
	Penalties
	Jiménez (penalty shoot-out scored); Vidosa (penalty shoot-out scored); Agulló (penalty shoot-out scored); Jiménez (penalty shoot-out missed); Álvarez (penalty shoot-out missed)		(penalty shoot-out scored) L. Hong; (penalty shoot-out missed) Y. Fan; (penalty shoot-out scored) C. Liu; (penalty shoot-out scored) W. Dan; (penalty shoot-out scored) Zhong

25 February 2026 2025–26 Women's FIH Pro League	Australia	1–3	China	Hobart, Australia
18:30	Sharman 40'	Report	Zhong 14'; Zou 17'; Zeng 44'	Stadium: Tasmanian Hockey Centre

28 April 2026 Test Match	China	1–1 (2–3 p)	Argentina	Changzhou, China
	no data		Granatto M.	Stadium: Wujin Hockey Stadium

30 April 2026 Test Match	China	2–1	Argentina	Changzhou, China
	no data		Granatto M.	Stadium: Wujin Hockey Stadium

4 May 2026 Test Match	China	2–2 (5–4 p)	Argentina	Changzhou, China
	no data		Granatto M. Castellaro	Stadium: Wujin Hockey Stadium

13 June 2026 2025–26 Women's FIH Pro League	China	1–4	Argentina	Wavre, Belgium
13:00	Liu 1'	Report	Granatto 30'; Pisthón 38'; Gorzelany 46'; Alastra 49'	Stadium: Stade Justin Peeters

16 June 2026 2025–26 Women's FIH Pro League	Belgium	5–0	China	Wavre, Belgium
18:30	Bonami 7', 39'; D. Marien 36'; Englebert 46'; Van Heel 55'	Report		Stadium: Stade Justin Peeters

18 June 2026 2025–26 Women's FIH Pro League	Belgium	0–1	China	Wavre, Belgium
18:30		Report	Zhang 10'	Stadium: Stade Justin Peeters

21 June 2026 2025–26 Women's FIH Pro League	Argentina	3–3 (4–3 p)	China	Wavre, Belgium
14:00	Gorzelany 6'; Miranda 30+'; Pisthón 38'	Report	Zhang 11', 51'; Chen 21'	Stadium: Stade Justin Peeters
	Penalties
	Granatto (penalty shoot-out scored); Cairo (penalty shoot-out scored); Jankunas (penalty shoot-out scored); Casas (penalty shoot-out missed); Díaz (penalty shoot-out scored)		(penalty shoot-out scored) Li; (penalty shoot-out scored) Fan; (penalty shoot-out missed) Liu; (penalty shoot-out scored) Dan; (penalty shoot-out missed) Zhang

24 June 2026 2025–26 Women's FIH Pro League	China	2–1	Ireland	Berlin, Germany
17:30	Yang L. 25'; Zhong 58'	Report	Hawkshaw 1'	Stadium: Ernst-Reuter Sportfeld

25 June 2026 2025–26 Women's FIH Pro League	Germany	2–1	China	Berlin, Germany
17:30	Schwabe 12'; Wiedermann 44'	Report	Yu 50'	Stadium: Ernst-Reuter Sportfeld

27 June 2026 2025–26 Women's FIH Pro League	Ireland	0–1	China	Berlin, Germany
16:30		Report	Zhang 7'	Stadium: Ernst-Reuter Sportfeld

28 June 2026 2025–26 Women's FIH Pro League	Germany	5–1	China	Berlin, Germany
15:30	Stoffelsma 46'; Fleschütz 47'; Schwabe 57'; Strauss 58'; Zimmermann 60'	Report	Tan 59'	Stadium: Ernst-Reuter Sportfeld

16 August 2026 World Cup Pool D	China	2–2	India	Amstelveen, Netherlands
13:00	Zhang 15'; Ma 39'	Report	Navneet 8'; Deepika 25'	Stadium: Wagener Stadium

18 August 2026 World Cup Pool D	England	2–4	China	Amstelveen, Netherlands
12:30	Howard 54'; Hamilton 57'	Report	Zou 18', 35'; Chen 22'; Liu 23'	Stadium: Wagener Stadium

20 August 2026 World Cup Pool D	China	5–1	South Africa	Amstelveen, Netherlands
09:30	Zou 4', 58'; Zhong 25'; Yu 30'; Chen 46'	Report	Isaacs 25'	Stadium: Wagener Stadium

21 August 2026 World Cup Pool E	China	1–1	Australia	Amstelveen, Netherlands
15:00	Zhang 39'	Report	Wilson 48'	Stadium: Wagener Stadium

23 August 2026 World Cup Pool E	Netherlands	4–1	China	Amstelveen, Netherlands
16:00	Moes 10'; Albers 11'; Burg 22'; Veen 28'	Report	Zhang 24'	Stadium: Wagener Stadium

27 August 2026 World Cup 7th place match	China	1–1 (0–1 p)	Spain	Wavre, Belgium
17:00	Yu 30'	Report	Segu 15'	Stadium: Belfius Hockey Arena
	Penalties
	Li (penalty shoot-out missed); Liu (penalty shoot-out missed); Dan (penalty shoot-out missed); Fan (penalty shoot-out missed); Zhang (penalty shoot-out missed); Li (penalty shoot-out missed)		(penalty shoot-out missed) P. Jiménez; (penalty shoot-out missed) Vidosa; (penalty shoot-out missed) L. Jimenez; (penalty shoot-out missed) Agulló; (penalty shoot-out missed) Giné; (penalty shoot-out scored) L. Jiménez

20 September 2026 Asian Games Pool A	China	13–0	Bangladesh	Kakamigahara, Japan
09:00	Zhong 4', 13', 29'; Chen Ya. 12', 18'; Li 13'; Zhang 27'; Ma 32'; Yang 36'; Zou 38', 51'; Chen Yi 41', 57'	Report		Stadium: Gifu Prefectural Green Stadium

21 September 2026 Asian Games Pool A	China	10–0	Chinese Taipei	Kakamigahara, Japan
11:00	Chen Yi 7', 32', 32'; Zhong 23', 34'; Zhang 39'; Ma 54'; Fan 55'; Chen Ya. 57'; Yu 58'	Report		Stadium: Gifu Prefectural Green Stadium

23 September 2026 Asian Games Pool A	Malaysia	0–4	China	Kakamigahara, Japan
19:00		Report	Yu 2'; Zhong 25', 44'; Zhang 47'	Stadium: Gifu Prefectural Green Stadium

25 September 2026 Asian Games Pool A	South Korea	0–3	China	Kakamigahara, Japan
13:00		Report	Zhang 40'; Liu 46'; Chen Ya. 60'	Stadium: Gifu Prefectural Green Stadium

27 September 2026 Asian Games Pool A	China	16–0	Kazakhstan	Kakamigahara, Japan
09:00	Yu 8', 28', 29'; Chen Ya. 16'; Zhang 23', 24', 24'; Zhong 23', 27'; Dan 44', 49'; Chen Yi 51', 59'; Li H. 56'; Zou 57'; Fan 58'	Report		Stadium: Gifu Prefectural Green Stadium

30 September 2026 Asian Games Semi-final	China	0–0 (4–2 p)	Japan	Kakamigahara, Japan
16:30		Report		Stadium: Gifu Prefectural Green Stadium
	Penalties
	Li (penalty shoot-out missed); Liu (penalty shoot-out scored); Ma (penalty shoot-out scored); Dan (penalty shoot-out scored); He (penalty shoot-out scored)		(penalty shoot-out scored) Murayama; (penalty shoot-out missed) Kobayakawa; (penalty shoot-out missed) Nakagomi; (penalty shoot-out scored) Hasegawa

2 October 2026 Asian Games Gold medal match	China	0–1	India	Kakamigahara, Japan
19:00		Report	Lalremsiami 10'	Stadium: Gifu Prefectural Green Stadium

19 November 2026 ACT Round-robin	China	7–0	Thailand	Bhopal, India
12:05	Feng 27', 32'; Deng 28', 42'; Wei 33'; Chen. Y 38'; Zhang. H 56'	Report		Stadium: Barkheda Nathu International Sports Complex

21 November 2026 ACT Round-robin	China	2–2	Malaysia	Bhopal, India
14:30	Wei 35'; Feng. J 41'	Report	Siti 31'; Azhairy 45'	Stadium: Barkheda Nathu International Sports Complex

22 November 2026 ACT Round-robin	Japan	3–1	China	Bhopal, India
12:45	Yamamoto 19'; Kaneko 35'; Maruyama 60'	Report	Cai 45'	Stadium: Barkheda Nathu International Sports Complex

24 November 2026 ACT Round-robin	India	v	China	Bhopal, India
19:00				Stadium: Barkheda Nathu International Sports Complex

25 November 2026 ACT Round-robin	China	v	South Korea	Bhopal, India
16:45				Stadium: Barkheda Nathu International Sports Complex

== See also ==
- China men's national field hockey team
