= 2025 Women's Hockey Asia Cup =

International field hockey tournament

2025 Women's Asia Cup

Tournament details
- Host country: CHINA
- City: Hangzhou
- Dates: 5–14 September
- Teams: 8 (from 1 confederation)
- Venue: Gongshu Canal Sports Park Field Hockey Field

Final positions
- Champions: China (3rd title)
- Runner-up: India
- Third place: Japan

Tournament statistics
- Matches played: 28
- Goals scored: 173 (6.18 per match)
- Top scorer: (China) Zou Meirong (11 goals)
- Best player: (India) Udita Duhan
- Best young player: (China) Luo Yaxi

The 2025 Women's Hockey Asia Cup was the 11th edition of the Women's Hockey Asia Cup, the quadrennial international women's field hockey championship of Asia organized by the Asian Hockey Federation. It was held from 5 to 14 September 2025 at the Gongshu Canal Sports Park Hockey Field in Hangzhou, China.

China as the winner qualified for the 2026 Women's FIH Hockey World Cup. Japan were the defending champions.

== Qualification ==
=== Qualified teams ===
Highlighted are the countries that are participating in the 2025 Women's Asia Cup. Qualified via FIH rankings or AHF Cup Qualified via FIH ranking and as hosts

The following eight teams participated in the tournament.

Dates	Event	Location	Quotas	Qualifiers
—N/a	FIH Women's World Ranking	—N/a	6	China (host); India; Japan; Malaysia; South Korea; Thailand
17–27 April 2025	2025 AHF Cup	Jakarta, Indonesia	2	Chinese Taipei; Singapore
Total			8	

== Squads ==
China

Head coach: (Australia) Alyson Annan

3. Yang Liu
6. Zhang Ying
7. Chen Yi
9. Ma Ning
11. Dan Wen
13. Li Hong
16. Ou Zixia (C)
18. Zou Meirong
20. He Jiangxin
23. Fan Yunxia
26. Chen Yang
27. Xu Wenyu
29. Liu Ping (GK)
31. Zhong Jiaqi
35. Tan Jinzhuang
36. Liu Chencheng
62. Wu Surong (GK)
62. Luo Yaxi
Chinese Taipei
India

Head coach: Harendra Singh

5. Suman Devi Thoudam
7. Sharmila Devi
8. Nikki Pradhan
9. Bichu Devi Kharibam (GK)
10. Bansari Solanki (GK)
14. Sangita Kumari
15. Mumtaz Khan
18. Udita Duhan
19. Vaishnavi Phalke
20. Lalremsiami Hmarzote
24. Jyoti Rumavat
25. Navneet Kaur
29. Sunelita Toppo
30. Salima Tete (C)
32. Neha Goyal
35. Rutuja Pisal
50. Ishika Chaudhary
52. Beauty Dungdung
Japan

Head coach: Akira Takahashi

5. Niko Maruyama
7. Miyu Suzuki
9. Mai Toriyama
10. Miki Otsuka
11. Nanako Tateiwa
13. Hanami Saito
15. Chiko Fujibayashi
16. Nozomi Goshima
19. Emi Nishikori
21. Mayuri Horikawa
23. Saki Tanaka
26. Amiru Shimada (C)
27. Akio Tanaka (GK)
28. Hiroka Murayama
29. Shiho Kobayakawa
33. Ikumi Matsu
34. Yu Kudo (GK)
36. Miyu Hasegawa
Malaysia
Singapore

Head coach: Henry Wong

5. Jolene Ng
6. Phylicia Tanandika
7. Li Min Toh
9. Nadiah Ong
10. Amani Sherie
11. Puay Ho
13. Hajaratih Johana
16. Laura Tan
17. Cheryll Chia
18. Felissa Lai (GK)
20. Sardonna Ng (C)
22. Megan Francis
25. Ivy Chan
26. Gene Leck
27. Han Yu Ong
28. Valerie Tay
30. Cindy Ong
77. Valerie Sim (C)
South Korea

Head coach: Kim Yoon

1. Kim Eun-ji (GK)
2. Lee Ju-yeon
3. Son Hyer-young
4. Jeong Da-bin
7. Kim Yu-jin
8. An Su-jin
9. Park Seung-ae
10. Cheon Eun-bi (C)
11. Cho Hye-jin
12. Kim Eun-ji
13. Jin Su-yeon
14. Lee Yu-ri
16. Kim Jeong-ihn
18. Park Seo-yeon
19. Choi Ji-yun
28. Park Yeong-eun
29. Kim Min-jeong
31. Lee Seo-yeon (GK)
Thailand

Head coach: Young Wook Bae

1. Alisa Narueangram (GK)
2. Sawita Kakkaeo
3. Jenjira Kijpakdee
4. Suwapat Konthong
5. Theppawan Khongwichien
6. Parichart Phopool
7. Kunjira Inpa
8. Sudarat Noo-Keaw
10. Thanaphon Khamnon
11. Natthakarn Aunjai
13. Supansa Samanso (C)
15. Songkran Pasawat
16. Anongnat Piresram
17. Trinetr Jirapitisatja
18. Siraya Yimkrajang (GK)
26. Jenjira Inpa
42. Akamsiri Gasornjan
69. Kawintida Wisuttiprapa

== Preliminary round ==
All times are local (UTC+8).

=== Pool A ===
Pos	Team	Pld	W	D	L	GF	GA	GD	Pts	Qualification
1	China (H)	3	3	0	0	31	0	+31	9	Super4s
2	South Korea	3	2	0	1	14	3	+11	6	Super4s
3	Malaysia	3	1	0	2	11	14	−3	3	
4	Chinese Taipei	3	0	0	3	1	40	−39	0	

Source: FIH
Rules for classification: 1) points; 2) matches won; 3) goal difference; 4) goals for; 5) head-to-head result; 6) field goals scored.
(H) Hosts

5 September 2025
16:45

South Korea	9–0	Chinese Taipei
Kim Yu-j. 1', 24'; Cho 2'; Park Seung-a. 26', 28'; Park Yeong-e. 29'; Park Seo-y. 40'; Cheon 41', 56'	Report

Umpires:
Valerie Koh (SGP)
Shivani Sharma (IND)

5 September 2025
19:00

China	8–0	Malaysia
Zou 1', 36'; Li 13'; Ou 17'; Dan 32'; Fan 34'; Chen Ya. 40'; Zhong 49'	Report

Umpires:
Minami Inamoto (JPN)
Ornpimol Kittiteerasopon (THA)

7 September 2025
16:45

Malaysia	11–1	Chinese Taipei
Azhar 2', 23', 60'; Zulkifli 3', 16'; K. Mohd 8', 32'; Onn 14'; Sukri 21'; S. Mohd 36', 56'	Report	Huang Y. 59'

Umpires:
Liu Xiaoying (CHN)
Shivani Sharma (IND)

7 September 2025
19:00

South Korea	0–3	China
	Report	Zhong 6'; Chen Yi 15'; Xu 48'

Umpires:
Minami Inamoto (JPN)
Valerie Koh (SGP)

8 September 2025
16:45

Malaysia	0–5	South Korea
	Report	Kim Eun-ji 12'; Cheon 27', 30'; Jeong 39'; Cho 58'

Umpires:
Aleisha Neumann (AUS)
Meghan McLennan (CAN)

8 September 2025
19:00

China	20–0	Chinese Taipei
Zhong 2', 30', 58'; Zou 4', 13', 23', 28', 52'; Ou 6', 44'; Zhang 7', 20', 21', 42', 47'; Fan 9'; Ma 15+'; Chen Ya. 32', 54'; Liu 58'	Report

Umpires:
Valerie Koh (SGP)
Fatma Mahmoud (EGY)

=== Pool B ===
Pos	Team	Pld	W	D	L	GF	GA	GD	Pts	Qualification
1	India	3	2	1	0	25	2	+23	7	Super4s
2	Japan	3	2	1	0	17	2	+15	7	Super4s
3	Thailand	3	1	0	2	2	18	−16	3	
4	Singapore	3	0	0	3	1	23	−22	0	

Updated to match(es) played on 8 September 2025. Source: FIH
Rules for classification: 1) points; 2) matches won; 3) goal difference; 4) goals for; 5) head-to-head result; 6) field goals scored.

5 September 2025
12:15

Japan	9–0	Singapore
Maruyama 2', 24'; Hasegawa 7', 41', 60'; Saito 14'; Murayama 18', 24'; Kobayakawa 59'	Report

Umpires:
Shahiela Johari (MAS)
Aleisha Neumann (AUS)

5 September 2025
14:30

India	11–0	Thailand
Mumtaz 7', 49'; Sangita 10'; Navneet 16'; Lalremsiami 18'; Udita 30+', 52'; Beauty 45', 54'; Sharmila 57'; Rutuja 60'	Report

Umpires:
Kim Yoon-seon (KOR)
Li Lulu (CHN)

6 September 2025
16:45

Thailand	2–1	Singapore
Aunjai 12'; Inpa 43'	Report	Chia 28'

Umpires:
Yu Tian (CHN)
Fatma Mahmoud (EGY)

6 September 2025
19:00

Japan	2–2	India
Murayama 10'; Fujibayashi 58'	Report	Rutuja 30'; Navneet 60+'

Umpires:
Liu Xiaoying (CHN)
Meghan McLennan (CAN)

8 September 2025
12:15

Thailand	0–6	Japan
	Report	Hasegawa 8', 51'; Kobayakawa 23'; Toriyama 34', 46'; Murayama 35'

Umpires:
Yu Tian (CHN)
Kim Yoon-seon (KOR)

8 September 2025
14:30

India	12–0	Singapore
Mumtaz 2', 32', 39'; Neha 11', 38'; Lalremsiami 13'; Navneet 14', 20', 28'; Udita 29'; Sharmila 45'; Rutuja 53'	Report

Umpires:
Li Lulu (CHN)
Shahiela Johari (MAS)

== Fifth to eighth place ==
=== Classification pool ===
Pos	Team	Pld	W	D	L	GF	GA	GD	Pts	Qualification
1	Malaysia	3	3	0	0	19	3	+16	9	Fifth place match
2	Singapore	3	1	1	1	5	7	−2	4	Fifth place match
3	Thailand	3	1	1	1	5	8	−3	4	Seventh place match
4	Chinese Taipei	3	0	0	3	2	13	−11	0	Seventh place match

Source: FIH
Rules for classification: 1) points; 2) matches won; 3) goal difference; 4) goals for; 5) head-to-head result; 6) field goals scored.

10 September 2025
12:15

Malaysia	5–1	Singapore
K. Mohd 6', 20'; Abang 16', 18'; Zulkifli 41'	Report	Johana 54'

Umpires:
Ornpimol Kittiteerasopon (THA)
Minami Inamoto (JPN)

10 September 2025
14:30

Thailand	2–1	Chinese Taipei
Piresram 13'; K. Inpa 51'	Report	Zhu 43'

Umpires:
Shahiela Johari (MAS)
Liu Xiaoying (CHN)

11 September 2025
12:15

Singapore	3–1	Chinese Taipei
Ng 1'; Chia 28'; Toh 59'	Report	Huang Y. 34'

Umpires:
Shahiela Johari (MAS)
Ornpimol Kittiteerasopon (THA)

11 September 2025
14:30

Thailand	2–6	Malaysia
Samanso 28', 42'	Report	K. Mohd 6'; Syafi 21'; Zulkifli 30', 45'; Azhairy 35'; Azhar 43'

Umpires:
Meghan McLennan (CAN)
Li Lulu (CHN)

13 September 2025
12:15

Malaysia	8–0	Chinese Taipei
S. Mohd 3', 18'; Azhar 4', 29'; Zulkifli 10', 16'; Che Musa 20'; Sukri 21'	Report

Umpires:
Minami Inamoto (JPN)
Fatma Mahmoud (EGY)

13 September 2025
14:30

Singapore	1–1	Thailand
Johana 56'	Report	K. Inpa 51'

Umpires:
Yu Tian (CHN)
Li Lulu (CHN)

=== Seventh and eighth place ===
14 September 2025
11:00

Thailand	4–1	Chinese Taipei
Piresram 4'; Khongwichien 20'; Phopool 26'; Kijpakdee 30+'	Report	Fan 43'

Umpires:
Fatma Mahmoud (EGY)
Shahiela Johari (MAS)

=== Fifth and sixth place ===
14 September 2025
13:30

Malaysia	8–1	Singapore
Azhar 18', 51'; Syafi 32'; Baharudin 38'; Zulkifli 39', 46'; Mohd Suhaimi 45'; Che Musa 52'	Report	Chia 4'

Umpires:
Yu Tian (CHN)
Minami Inamoto (JPN)

== First to fourth place ==
=== Super 4's Pool ===
Pos	Team	Pld	W	D	L	GF	GA	GD	Pts	Qualification
1	China (H)	3	3	0	0	7	1	+6	9	Final
2	India	3	1	1	1	6	7	−1	4	Final
3	Japan	3	0	2	1	2	4	−2	2	Third place match
4	South Korea	3	0	1	2	3	6	−3	1	Third place match

Source: FIH
Rules for classification: 1) points; 2) matches won; 3) goal difference; 4) goals for; 5) head-to-head result; 6) field goals scored.
(H) Hosts

10 September 2025
16:45

India	4–2	South Korea
Phalke 2'; Sangita 33'; Lalremsiami 40'; Rutuja 59'	Report	Kim Yu-j. 33', 53'

Umpires:
Meghan McLennan (CAN)
Aleisha Neumann (AUS)

10 September 2025
19:00

China	2–0	Japan
Zou 14'; Liu 34'	Report

Umpires:
Kim Yoon-seon (KOR)
Shivani Sharma (IND)

11 September 2025
16:45

Japan	1–1	South Korea
Suzuki 11'	Report	Cho 40'

Umpires:
Liu Xiaoying (CHN)
Shivani Sharma (IND)

11 September 2025
19:00

India	1–4	China
Mumtaz 38'	Report	Zou 4', 56'; Chen Ya. 31'; Tan 47'

Umpires:
Valerie Koh (SGP)
Kim Yoon-seon (KOR)

13 September 2025
16:45

Japan	1–1	India
Kobayakawa 58'	Report	Beauty 7'

Umpires:
Aleisha Neumann (AUS)
Valerie Koh (SGP)

13 September 2025
19:00

China	1–0	South Korea
Ou 27'	Report

Umpires:
Ornpimol Kittiteerasopon (THA)
Meghan McLennan (CAN)

=== Third and fourth place ===
14 September 2025
16:00

Japan	2–1	South Korea
Kobayakawa 20'; Murayama 55'	Report	Park Yeong-e 11'

Umpires:
Shivani Sharma (IND)
Liu Xiaoying (CHN)

=== Final ===
14 September 2025
20:00

China	4–1	India
Ou 21'; Li 41'; Zou 51'; Zhong 53'	Report	Navneet 1'

Umpires:
Kim Yoon-seon (KOR)
Aleisha Neumann (AUS)

== Statistics ==
=== Final standings ===
Pos	Team	Qualification
1st place, gold medalist(s)	China (H)	2026 Hockey World Cup
2nd place, silver medalist(s)	India	2026 World Cup Qualifiers
3rd place, bronze medalist(s)	Japan	2026 World Cup Qualifiers
4	South Korea	2026 World Cup Qualifiers
5	Malaysia	2026 World Cup Qualifiers
6	Singapore	
7	Thailand	
8	Chinese Taipei	

Source: FIH
(H) Host

=== Goalscorers ===
There were 173 goals scored in 28 matches, for an average of 6.18 goals per match.

11 goals

- (China) Zou Meirong

9 goals

- (Malaysia) Nuramirah Zulkifli

8 goals

- (Malaysia) Nur Azhar

6 goals

- (China) Zhong Jiaqi
- (India) Navneet Kaur
- (India) Mumtaz Khan

5 goals

- (China) Ou Zixia
- (China) Zhang Ying
- (Japan) Miyu Hasegawa
- (Japan) Hiroka Murayama
- (Malaysia) Khairunnisa Mohd

4 goals

- (China) Chen Yang
- (India) Rutuja Pisal
- (Japan) Shiho Kobayakawa
- (Malaysia) Siti Mohd
- (South Korea) Cheon Eun-bi
- (South Korea) Kim Yu-jin

3 goals

- (India) Udita Duhan
- (India) Beauty Dungdung
- (India) Lalremsiami Hmarzote
- (South Korea) Cho Hye-jin
- (Singapore) Cheryll Chia
- (Thailand) Kunjira Inpa

2 goals

- (China) Fan Yunxia
- (China) Li Hong
- (China) Liu Chencheng
- (Chinese Taipei) Huang Yu-ting
- (India) Sharmila Devi
- (India) Neha Goyal
- (India) Sangita Kumari
- (Japan) Niko Maruyama
- (Japan) Mai Toriyama
- (Malaysia) Dayang Abang
- (Malaysia) Nur Che Musa
- (Malaysia) Fatin Sukri
- (Malaysia) Nurmaizatul Syafi
- (Singapore) Hajaratih Johana
- (South Korea) Park Seung-ae
- (South Korea) Park Yeong-eun
- (Thailand) Anongnat Piresram
- (Thailand) Supansa Samanso

1 goal

- (China) Chen Yi
- (China) Dan Wen
- (China) Ma Ning
- (China) Tan Jinzhuang
- (China) Xu Wenyu
- (Chinese Taipei) Fan Hui-yun
- (Chinese Taipei) Zhu Yi-chun
- (India) Vaishnavi Phalke
- (Japan) Chiko Fujibayashi
- (Japan) Hanami Saito
- (Japan) Miyu Suzuki
- (Malaysia) Azmyra Azhairy
- (Malaysia) Anith Baharudin
- (Malaysia) Nur Mohd Suhaimi
- (Malaysia) Hanis Onn
- (Singapore) Sardonna Ng
- (Singapore) Li Min Toh
- (South Korea) Jeong Da-bin
- (South Korea) Kim Eun-ji
- (South Korea) Park Seo-yeon
- (Thailand) Natthakarn Aunjai
- (Thailand) Theppawan Khongwichien
- (Thailand) Jenjira Kijpakdee
- (Thailand) Parichart Phopool

Source: FIH

== See also ==
- 2025 Women's Hockey U18 Asia Cup
- 2026 Women's FIH Hockey World Cup
