= Kim Yu-jin (field hockey) =

South Korean field hockey player (born 1996)

Personal information
- Born: 21 January 1993 (age 33) South Korea

Sport
- Sport: Field hockey
- Position: Forward
- Club: KT Sports
National team
| Years | Team | Caps | Goals |
| 2017– | South Korea | 33 | (4) |
Medal record
Women's field hockey
Representing South Korea
Asian Cup
| Bronze medal – third place | 2017 Kakamigahara | Team |
FIH World League
| Bronze medal – third place | 2016–17 Auckland | Team |

Kim Yu-jin (Korean: 김유진, born 21 January 1993) is a field hockey player from South Korea, who plays as a forward.

== Career ==
=== Senior national team ===
Kim made her senior international debut for South Korea in 2017. She earned her first senior international cap at the Four Nations Cup in Berlin. Throughout 2017 she medalled with the national team twice, taking home bronze medals at the Asian Cup in Kakamigahara and the FIH World League Finals in Auckland.

She made two appearances in 2018 during a test series against India in Seoul, before leaving the national squad.

After 6 years out of the national team, Kim returned to the squad in 2024. She represented the team at the 2023–24 FIH Nations Cup in Terrassa. She has since made appearances at the 2025 Asian Cup in Hangzhou.

=== International goals ===
| Goal | Date | Location | Opponent | Score | Result | Competition | Ref. |
|---|---|---|---|---|---|---|---|
| 1 | 5 September 2025 | Gongshu Canal Sports Stadium, Hangzhou, China | Chinese Taipei | 1–0 | 9–0 | 2025 Asian Cup | |
| 2 | 5 September 2025 | Gongshu Canal Sports Stadium, Hangzhou, China | Chinese Taipei | 3–0 | 9–0 | 2025 Asian Cup | |
| 3 | 10 September 2025 | Gongshu Canal Sports Stadium, Hangzhou, China | India | 1–2 | 2–4 | 2025 Asian Cup | |
| 4 | 10 September 2025 | Gongshu Canal Sports Stadium, Hangzhou, China | India | 2–3 | 2–4 | 2025 Asian Cup | |
