= Kim Eun-ji =

South Korean field hockey player (born 1999)

Personal information
- Born: 23 January 1999 (age 27) Seongju County, South Korea
- Height: 154 cm (5 ft 1 in)

Sport
- Sport: Field hockey
- Position: Defence
- Club: Pyeongtaek City Hall
National team
Years	Team	Caps	Goals
2018–	South Korea	39	(3)
Medal record
Women's field hockey
Representing South Korea
Asian Games
Silver medal – second place	2022 Hangzhou	Team

Kim Eun-ji (Korean: 김은지, born 23 January 1999) is a field hockey player from South Korea, who plays as a defender.

== Life ==
Kim Eun-ji was born and raised in Seongju-gun, South Korea.

== Career ==
=== Senior national team ===
Kim made her senior international debut for South Korea in 2018. She earned her first senior international cap at the SOMPO Cup in Osaka.

After not representing the team in four years, Kim was named as a reserve player for the FIH Nations Cup in Valencia, not playing any minutes at the tournament. She made her return to international competition during a test series against South Africa in Jincheon-gun. She won her first medal with the team in the months following, taking home a silver medal at the delayed 2022 Asian Games in Hangzhou.

Since returning to the national setup, Kim has been a regular inclusion in the national team. She has appeared at the 2023–24 and 2024–25 editions of the FIH Nations Cup in Terrassa and Santiago, respectively. Her most recent appearances were at the 2025 Asian Cup in Hangzhou.

=== International goals ===
Goal	Date	Location	Opponent	Score	Result	Competition	Ref.
1	16 September 2018	Ritsumeikan University, Osaka, Japan	United States	1–1	2–1	2018 SOMPO Cup	
2	9 June 2024	Estadi Martí Colomer, Terrassa, Spain	Italy	1–0	1–2	2023–24 FIH Nations Cup	
3	8 September 2025	Gongshu Canal Sports Stadium, Hangzhou, China	Malaysia	1–0	5–0	2025 Asian Cup	
