= 2018 Women's Hockey Sompo Cup =

2018 SOMPO CUP
Tournament details
- Host country: Japan
- City: Ibaraki, Osaka
- Teams: 4
- Venue(s): Ritsumeikan University, Osaka

Final positions
- Champions: Japan (1st title)
- Runner-up: Australia
- Third place: South Korea

Tournament statistics
- Matches played: 8
- Goals scored: 25 (3.13 per match)
- Top scorer(s): (Australia) Stephanie Kershaw (Australia) Renee Taylor (Japan) Kanon Mori (2 goals)

The 2018 Women's Hockey SOMPO CUP is the first Hockey SOMPO CUP, an international women's field hockey tournament consisting of a series of test matches. It took place in Japan from September 12 to 16, 2018, featuring four of the top nations in women's field hockey.

== Competition format ==
The tournament featured the national teams of Australia, South Korea, United States, and the hosts, Japan, competing in a round-robin format, with each team playing against each other once. Three points were awarded for a win, one for a draw, and none for a loss.

Country	August 2018 FIH Ranking	Best World Cup finish	Best Olympic Games finish
Australia	3	Champions (1994, 1998)	Champions (1988, 1996, 2000)
Japan	14	Fifth place (2006)	Eighth place (2004)
South Korea	10	Third place (1990)	Runners-up (1988, 1996)
United States	12	Third place (1994)	Third place (1984)

== Results ==
Pos	Team	Pld	W	D	L	GF	GA	GD	Pts	Result
1	Australia	3	3	0	0	7	2	+5	9	Final
2	Japan (H)	3	2	0	1	7	2	+5	6	Final
3	United States	3	1	0	2	3	6	−3	3	Third and fourth place playoff
4	South Korea	3	0	0	3	2	9	−7	0	Third and fourth place playoff

Source: FIH
Rules for classification: 1) Points; 2) Goal difference; 3) Goals scored; 4) Games won; 5) Head-to-head.
(H) Hosts

=== Pool matches ===
12 September 2018
16:30

South Korea	1–2	United States
Kim Jeong-ihn 22'	Report	Sharkey 28'; Woods 48'

Umpires:
Chen Hong (CHN)
Kerryl Chandler (AUS)

12 September 2018
18:30

Australia	2–0	Japan
R. Taylor 13'; Padget 42'	Report

Umpires:
Kim Jung-hee (KOR)
Mary Driscoll (USA)

13 September 2018
16:30

Australia	3–1	South Korea
Kershaw 18', 58'; Malone 44'	Report	In Ha-wa 23'

Umpires:
Junko Wagatsuma (JPN)
Mary Driscoll (USA)

13 September 2018
18:30

United States	0–3	Japan
	Report	Imao 1'; Tsubouchi 27'; Shimizu 44'

Umpires:
Kim Jung-Hee (KOR)
Kerryl Chandler (AUS)

15 September 2018
14:00

United States	1–2	Australia
West 59'	Report	Morgan 23'; Evans 60'

Umpires:
Chen Hong (CHN)
Junko Wagatsuma (JPN)

15 September 2018
16:00

South Korea	0–4	Japan
	Report	Mori 5', 25'; Matsumoto 7'; Sasaki 20'

Umpires:
Mary Driscoll (USA)
Kerryl Chandler (AUS)

=== Classification matches ===
==== Third and fourth place ====
16 September 2018
13:45

United States	1–2	South Korea
Funk 27'	Report	Kim Eun-ji 55'; Lee Yu-rim 56'

Umpires:
Junko Wagatsuma (JPN)
Chen Hong (CHN)

==== Final ====
16 September 2018
16:00

Australia	1–2	Japan
R. Taylor 3'	Report	Suzuki 10'; Toriyama 22'

Umpires:
Kim Jung-hee (KOR)
Mary Driscoll (USA)

== Statistics ==
=== Goalscorers ===
2 goals

- (Australia) Stephanie Kershaw
- (Australia) Renee Taylor
- (Japan) Kanon Mori

1 goal

- (Australia) Naomi Evans
- (Australia) Ambrosia Malone
- (Australia) Georgina Morgan
- (Australia) Hayley Padget
- (Japan) Akiko Imao
- (Japan) Natsuha Matsumoto
- (Japan) Moe Sasaki
- (Japan) Minami Shimizu
- (Japan) Miyu Suzuki
- (Japan) Mai Toriyama
- (Japan) Moeka Tsubouchi
- (South Korea) Kim Eun-ji
- (South Korea) In Ha-wa
- (South Korea) Kim Jeong-ihn
- (South Korea) Lee Yu-rim
- (United States) Jill Funk
- (United States) Kathleen Sharkey
- (United States) Taylor West
- (United States) Nicole Woods
