= Seo Su-young =

South Korean field hockey player (born 1996)

Personal information
- Born: 30 January 1996 (age 30) South Korea

Sport
- Sport: Field hockey
- Position: Defence
- Club: Pyeongtaek City Hall
National team
Years	Team	Caps	Goals
2022–	South Korea	26	(1)
Medal record
Women's field hockey
Representing South Korea
Asian Games
Silver medal – second place	2022 Hangzhou	Team

Seo Su-young (Korean: 서수영, born 30 January 1996) is a field hockey player from South Korea.

== Career ==
=== Senior national team ===
Seo made her senior international debut in 2018 at the SOMPO Cup in Osaka.

In 2023 Seo won her first major medal with the national team, taking home gold at the Asian Games in Hangzhou.

She has been named in the squad for the 2024 FIH Olympic Qualifiers in Valencia.
