= Xu Wenyu =

Chinese field hockey player

Personal information
- Born: 6 December 1995 (age 30)

Sport
- Sport: Field hockey
National team
Years	Team	Caps	Goals
–	China	41	-
Medal record
Women's field hockey
Representing China
Olympic Games
Silver medal – second place	2024 Paris	Team
Asia Cup
Gold medal – first place	2025 Hangzhou
Silver medal – second place	2017 Gifu
Asian Champions Trophy
Silver medal – second place	2016 Singapore
Bronze medal – third place	2021 Donghae

Xu Wenyu (born 6 December 1995) is a Chinese field hockey player for the Chinese national team.

She participated at the 2018 Women's Hockey World Cup.
