= Bichu Devi Kharibam =

Indian hockey player (born 2000)

Bichu Devi
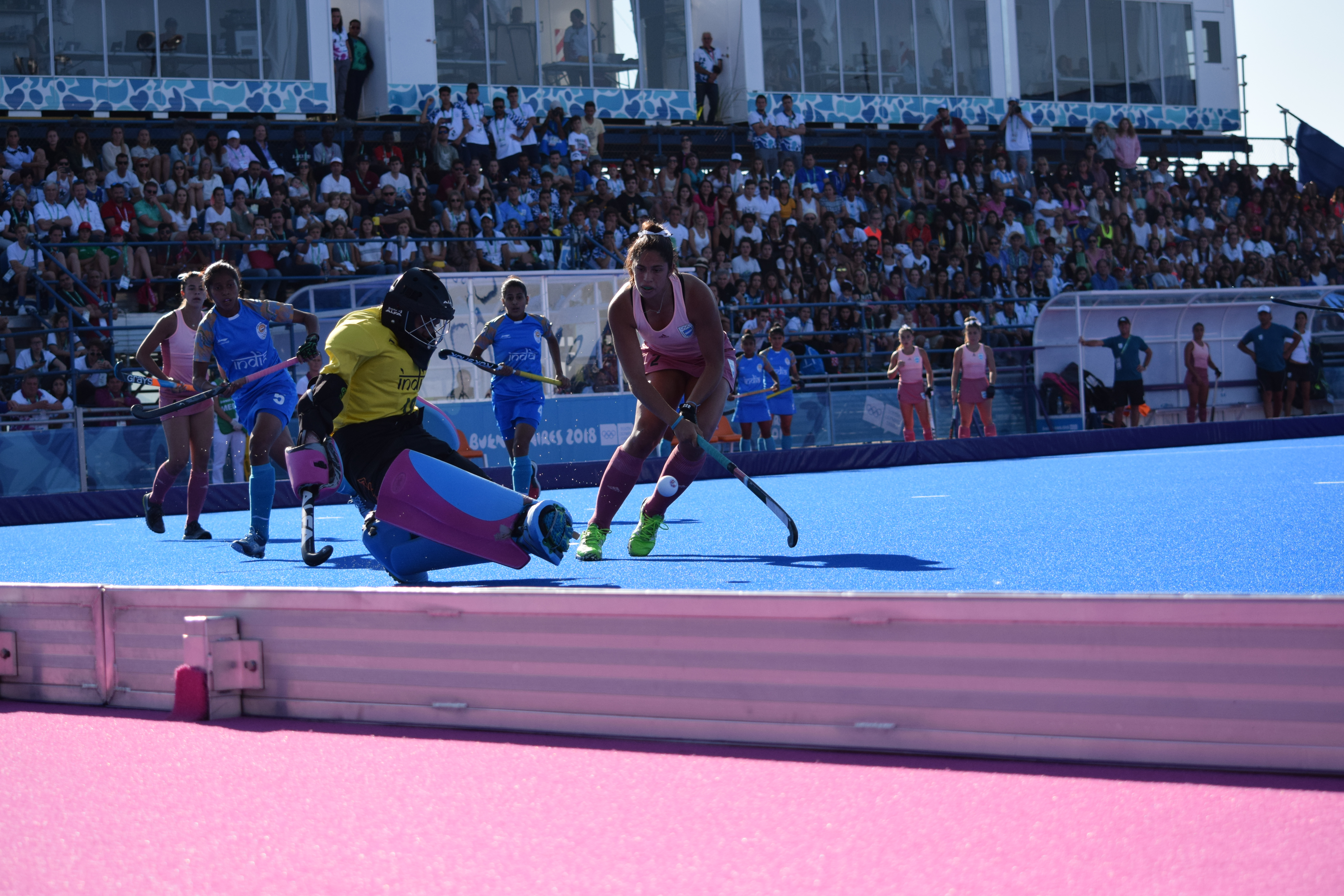
- Bichu Devi at the 2018 Summer Youth Olympics

Personal information
- Full name: Bichu Devi Kharibam
- Born: 3 December 2000 (age 25) Manipur, India

Sport
- Sport: Field hockey
- Position: Goalkeeper
Senior career
Years	Team	Caps	Goals
–	Madhya Pradesh Hockey Academy	-	-
2022–	Indian Oil Corporation Ltd	-	-
2025–	Delhi SG Pipers	-	-
National team
Years	Team	Caps	Goals
2018	India U18 Hockey5s	12	(0)
2019–2022	India U21	13	(0)
2022–	India	78	(0)
Medal record
Women's field hockey
Representing India
Asian Games
Gold medal – first place	2026 Aichi–Nagoya	Team
Bronze medal – third place	2022 Hangzhou	Team
Asia Cup
Silver medal – second place	2025 Hangzhou
Asian Champions Trophy
Gold medal – first place	2023 Ranchi
Gold medal – first place	2024 Rajgir
FIH Nations Cup
Gold medal – first place	2022 Spain
Youth Olympic Games
Silver medal – second place	2018 Buenos Aires	Team

Bichu Devi Kharibam (Meitei: Kharibam Bichu Devi, born 3 December 2000) is an Indian field hockey player and a member of the Indian hockey team. She hails from Manipur. She plays for Indian Oil Corporation Limited in the domestic hockey tournaments. She is a goalkeeper.

== Early life ==
Bichu Devi started as a football player. But when she did not make it to the local selections, her father persuaded her to go for hockey selections, and she was selected. That is how her switch to hockey happened and she initially continued playing the game with reluctance. In 2015, after a good performance against Jharkhand, she was spotted by a coach and hockey umpire Napoleon Singh, and upon his suggestion, she moved to the Madhya Pradesh Hockey Academy in Gwalior, where she honed her skills under coach Paramjeet Singh.

== Hockey career ==
- 2018: Goalkeeper Bichu Devi Kharibam played well at the 2018 Youth Olympics Games in Buenos Aires, Argentina, where India bagged a silver medal.
- 2019: She played well and was awarded ‘Goalkeeper of the Tournament’ in the 4 Nations Junior Women Invitational in Dublin, Ireland and helped India win the gold.
- 2019: She took part in the Test series against France and Belarus, and later in the same year she played well in Australia in the three-nation tournament.
- In 2021, she was part of the Indian team that took part in the FIH 9th Hockey Women's Junior World Cup 2021, Potchefstroom, South Africa where India finished fourth.
- In 2022, she made her debut for the Senior India team against Germany in the FIH Pro League held in Bhubaneswar, Odisha.
- 2022: FIH Women's Nation Cup in Spain.
- 2022: Women's Junior World Cup match against Germany in April 2022; she bagged the 'Player of the Match' award.
- 2023: She is selected as part of the Indian team for Asian Games in Hangzhou.
