= Liu Chencheng =

Chinese field hockey player

Personal information
- Born: 13 October 2002 (age 23) China
- Height: 166 cm (5 ft 5 in)

Sport
- Sport: Field hockey
- Position: Forward
National team
Years	Team	Caps	Goals
2018	China U–18	6	(6)
2023–	China	20	(1)
Medal record
Women's field hockey
Representing China
Asia Cup
Gold medal – first place	2025 Hangzhou

Liu Chencheng (born 13 October 2002) is a field hockey player from China, who plays as a forward.

== Career ==
=== Under–18 ===
Liu Chencheng made her international debut at under–18 level. She was a member of the Chinese squad at the Asian Qualifier for the 2018 Summer Youth Olympics, held in Bangkok.

=== National team ===
Liu did not represent China again until 2023. She made her senior international debut for the national team during season three of the FIH Pro League. Throughout the year she made numerous more appearances during the FIH Pro League, as well as during a test series against Australia in Perth. At the conclusion of the FIH Pro League, Liu was named as a reserve player for the Asian Games in Hangzhou.

In 2024, Liu continued representing China. She appeared in season four of the FIH Pro League and at the International Festival of Hockey in Perth. She has since been named in the squad for the Asian Champions Trophy in Rajgir.

=== International goals ===
Goal	Date	Location	Opponent	Score	Result	Competition	Ref.
1	3 June 2023	Lee Valley Hockey and Tennis Centre, London, England	Belgium	1–2	1–3	2022–23 FIH Pro League	
