= Tao Zhinan =

Chinese field hockey player

Personal information
- Born: February 7, 1981 (age 45)
- Height: 1.85 m (6 ft 1 in)

Sport
- Sport: Field hockey
National team
Years	Team	Caps	Goals
–	China		-

Tao Zhinan (Chinese: 陶志南; pinyin: Táo Zhìnán, born 7 February 1981) is a Chinese professional field hockey player who represented China at the 2008 Summer Olympics in Beijing. The team finished last in their group, and finished 11th after beating South Africa.
