= Ikumi Matsu =

Japanese field hockey player

Personal information
- Native name: 松 郁実; Matsu Ikumi
- Born: 8 September 1998 (age 27) Toyama Prefecture, Japan
- Height: 161 cm (5 ft 3 in)
- Weight: 53 kg (117 lb)

Sport
- Sport: Field hockey
- Position: Defence
- Club: Coca Cola Red Sparks
National team
Years	Team	Caps	Goals
2022–	Japan	27	(0)
Medal record
Women's field hockey
Representing Japan
Asian Cup
Gold medal – first place	2022 Muscat
Bronze medal – third place	2025 Hangzhou

Ikumi Matsu (松 郁実, born 8 September 1998) is a field hockey player from Japan.

== Personal life ==
Matsu was born in the Toyama Prefecture, on the Japanese island of Honshu.

== Career ==
=== Domestic league ===
In the Japanese national league, Matsu represents the Coca Cola Red Sparks.

=== Cherry Blossoms ===
In 2022, Matsu made her senior debut for Japan. She earned her first international cap during the Asian Cup in Muscat. While only making one appearance in the tournament due to injury, she won a gold medal with the team.

After her debut, Matsu did not represent the national team again until 2025. She returned to the squad for the 2024–25 FIH Nations Cup in Santiago. She followed this up with an appearance at her second Asian Cup in Hangzhou, where she won a bronze medal.

In 2026 she was named in the national squad for the 2026 FIH World Cup in Amsterdam and Wavre.
