= Yu Anhui =

Chinese field hockey player

Personal information
- Born: 30 April 2001 (age 25) China
- Height: 170 cm (5 ft 7 in)
- Weight: 60 kg (132 lb)

Sport
- Sport: Field hockey
- Position: Forward
National team
Years	Team	Caps	Goals
2018	China U–18	14	(12)
2022–	China	18	(3)
Medal record
Women's field hockey
Representing China
Olympic Games
Silver medal – second place	2024 Paris	Team
Asian Champions Trophy
Silver medal – second place	2024 Rajgir
Youth Olympic Games
Bronze medal – third place	2018 Buenos Aires	Team
Girls' Asia Cup
Gold medal – first place	2016 Bangkok

Yu Anhui (born 30 April 2001) is a field hockey player from China, who plays as a forward.

== Career ==
=== Under–18 ===
Yu made her junior international debut for China in 2018. She represented the national U–18 team at the Youth Olympic Games in Buenos Aires, where she won a bronze medal.

=== National team ===
In 2022, Yu made her international debut for China. She represented her country at the Asian Cup in Muscat, where the team finished in fourth place. She also represented the national team during season three of the FIH Pro League.

Yu did not represent the team again until 2024. She made her return to the national team during season five of the FIH Pro League. She has also represented the national side at the International Festival of Hockey in Perth.

==== International goals ====
Goal	Date	Location	Opponent	Score	Result	Competition	Ref.
1	4 February 2024	Kalinga Stadium, Bhubaneswar, India	Australia	2–0	3–0	2023–24 FIH Pro League	
2	15 February 2024	Birsa Munda International Hockey Stadium, Rourkela, India	Netherlands	1–2	2–4	2023–24 FIH Pro League	
3	23 April 2024	Perth Hockey Stadium, Perth, Australia	Japan	3–0	4–0	2024 International Festival of Hockey	
