= Dan Wen =

Chinese field hockey player

Personal information
- Born: 14 June 1999 (age 27) China

Sport
- Sport: Field hockey
- Position: Midfield
National team
Years	Team	Caps	Goals
2018–	China	90	(8)
Medal record
Women's field hockey
Representing China
Olympic Games
Silver medal – second place	2024 Paris	Team
Asian Games
Gold medal – first place	2022 Hangzhou	Team
Bronze medal – third place	2018 Jakarta	Team
Asia Cup
Gold medal – first place	2025 Hangzhou
Asian Champions Trophy
Bronze medal – third place	2018 Donghae
Bronze medal – third place	2021 Donghae
Bronze medal – third place	2023 Ranchi

Dan Wen (born 14 June 1999) is a field hockey player from China, who plays as a midfielder.

== Career ==
Dan made her senior international debut for China in 2018, during a test series against Spain in Málaga. Following her debut, she made a number of appearances for the national team throughout the year, most notably winning a bronze medal at the 2018 Asian Games in Jakarta.

Throughout her international career, Dan has medalled at three editions of the Asian Champions Trophy. She has won bronze on three occasions, at the 2018 and 2021 editions, both held in Donghae City, and at the 2023 edition in Ranchi.

In 2023, Dan won her first gold medal with the national team. She took home gold at the 2022 Asian Games in Hangzhou.

She continued her form in the national team in 2024, appearing in season five of the FIH Pro League, as well as the International Festival of Hockey in Perth.

=== International goals ===
Goal	Date	Location	Opponent	Score	Result	Competition	Ref.
1	16 May 2018	Donghae City Sunrise Stadium, Donghae City, South Korea	India	1–2	1–3	2018 Asian Champions Trophy	
2	26 June 2018	BH & BC Breda, Breda, Netherlands	Japan	1–1	1–3	2018 RaboTrophy	
3	9 February 2019	Tasmanian Hockey Centre, Hobart, Australia	Australia	2–2	3–4	2019 FIH Pro League	
4	25 September 2023	Gongshu Canal Sports Park, Hangzhou, China	Indonesia	2–0	20–0	2022 Asian Games	
5	28 October 2023	Jaipal Singh Stadium, Ranchi, India	Thailand	6–0	6–0	2023 Asian Champions Trophy	
6	3 February 2024	Kalinga Stadium, Bhubaneswar, India	India	1–1	2–1	2023–24 FIH Pro League	
7	7 February 2024	Kalinga Stadium, Bhubaneswar, India	United States	2–0	3–1	2023–24 FIH Pro League	
8	7 February 2024	Kalinga Stadium, Bhubaneswar, India	United States	3–0	3–1	2023–24 FIH Pro League	
