= Rika Ogawa =

Japanese field hockey player

Personal information
- Born: 28 July 1994 (age 32) Gifu Prefecture, Japan
- Height: 166 cm (5 ft 5 in)
- Weight: 57 kg (126 lb)

Sport
- Sport: Field hockey
- Position: Defence
Senior career
Years	Team	Caps	Goals
–	Sony HC Bravia Ladies	-	-
National team
Years	Team	Caps	Goals
2015	Japan U–21	3	(0)
2023–	Japan	7	(1)
Medal record
Women's field hockey
Representing Japan
Asian Champions Trophy
Silver medal – second place	2023 Ranchi	Team
Junior Asian Cup
Silver medal – second place	2015 Changzhou	Team

Rika Ogawa (小川 里佳, born 28 July 1994) is a Japanese field hockey player.

== Personal life ==
Rika Ogawa was born in the Gifu Prefecture.

== Career ==
=== Domestic league ===
In the Japanese national league, Ogawa represents the Sony HC Bravia Ladies.

=== Under–21 ===
In 2015, Ogawa was a member of the silver medal-winning team at the 2015 Junior Asian Cup in Changzhou.

=== Cherry Blossoms ===
Ogawa made her senior international debut in 2023 at the Asian Champions Trophy in Ranchi. At the tournament she won a silver medal.

She has been named in the squad for the 2024 FIH Olympic Qualifiers in Ranchi.
