= Agustina Gorzelany =

Argentine field hockey player

Personal information
- Born: 11 March 1996 (age 30) Argentina
- Height: 160 cm (5 ft 3 in)
- Weight: 63 kg (139 lb)

Sport
- Sport: Field hockey
- Position: Defender
- Club: Club San Martín
National team
Years	Team	Caps	Goals
2017–	Argentina	67	-
Medal record
Women's field hockey
Representing Argentina
Olympic Games
Silver medal – second place	2020 Tokyo	Team
Bronze medal – third place	2024 Paris	Team
World Cup
Gold medal – first place	2026 Wavre/Amstelveen
Silver medal – second place	2022 Terrassa/Amstelveen
Champions Trophy
Bronze medal – third place	2018 Changzhou
Pan American Games
Gold medal – first place	2023 Santiago	Team
Pan American Cup
Gold medal – first place	2017 Lancaster
Gold medal – first place	2022 Santiago
Gold medal – first place	2025 Montevideo
South American Games
Gold medal – first place	2018 Cochabamba
Junior World Cup
Gold medal – first place	2016 Santiago

Agustina Gorzelany (born 11 March 1996) is an Argentine field hockey player. She played for Club San Martín until her transfer to Amsterdamsche Hockey & Bandy Club in the Netherlands for the 2024-2025 season. She returned to Club San Martín in Argentina in May 2025. Gorzelany also plays for the Argentina national team, winning a silver medal at the 2020 Summer Olympics, and a bronze medal at the 2024 Summer Olympics.

== Hockey career ==
Gorzelany was part of the Argentina Junior National Team at the 2016 Junior World Cup where the team won the gold medal, defeating the Netherlands in the final.

In 2017, Gorzelany was called into the senior national women's team, and was part of the team that won the 2017 Pan American Cup.

She was part of the national squad that won the 2022 Pan American Cup. In 2022 she also won the 2021-22 Hockey Pro League and the silver medal at the 2022 World Cup. In 2023 she won the gold medal at 2023 Pan American Games.

In 2020, she won the silver medal with Argentina at the 2020 Tokyo Summer Olympics, and she also won the bronze medal with Las Leonas at the 2024 Paris Summer Olympics.
