= Tan Jinzhuang =

Chinese field hockey player (born 2003)

Personal information
- Born: 27 January 2003 (age 23) Kaijiang County, Dazhou, China

Sport
- Sport: Field hockey
- Position: Defender
- Club: Sichuan
Youth career
- Years: Team
- 2015–?: Dazhou Sports School
Senior career
Years	Team	Caps	Goals
–	Sichuan	-	-
National team
Years	Team	Caps	Goals
2022–	China	30	(1)
Medal record
Women's field hockey
Representing China
Olympic Games
Silver medal – second place	2024 Paris	Team
Asia Cup
Gold medal – first place	2025 Hangzhou
Asian Champions Trophy
Silver medal – second place	2024 Rajgir
Junior Asia Cup
Silver medal – second place	2024 Muscat
- Updated on 8 October 2024

Tan Jinzhuang (born 27 January 2003) is a Chinese field hockey player. She competed at the 2024 Summer Olympics and won a silver medal.

== Biography ==
Tan Jinzhuang was born on 27 January 2003 in Kaijiang County, Dazhou, China. She attended Yifu Primary School in Dachuan, Dazhou. In 2015, at the age of 12, she began her field hockey career at Dazhou Sports School. In 2018, she was a member of the team representing Dazhou No. 1 Middle School that competed at the 13th Sichuan Provincial Games. She competed at the 2nd Youth Games in 2019, helping her team place second, and in 2021, she competed at the 14th National Games representing Shaanxi, with her team placing sixth.

Tan competes for the Sichuan club. In November 2022, she was a member of teams winning both the National Women's Field Hockey Championship and the National Youth Women's Hockey Championship. Later that month, she was called up to the China women's national field hockey team for the first time. Tan led her club to a repeat national championship in 2023. She also competed internationally for China at the 2023 Asian Games and the 2023 world championships.

Tan was selected to compete for China at the 2024 Summer Olympics. She helped the team reach the finals with a 4–3 win over Belgium in the semifinals. In the finals, China played against the Netherlands and ended with a 3–1 loss, thus receiving the silver medal. By October 2024, she had appeared for the national team a total of 30 times, with one goal scored.
