= Miyu Suzuki =

Japanese field hockey player

Personal information
- Born: 8 January 1999 (age 27) Gifu Prefecture, Japan
- Height: 157 cm (5 ft 2 in)
- Weight: 56 kg (123 lb)

Sport
- Sport: Field hockey
- Position: Defence
Senior career
Years	Team	Caps	Goals
–	Sony HC	-	-
National team
Years	Team	Caps	Goals
2018–	Japan	58	(6)
Medal record
Women's field hockey
Representing Japan
Asian Cup
Gold medal – first place	2022 Muscat
Bronze medal – third place	2025 Hangzhou
FIH Hockey Series
Silver medal – second place	2018–19 Hiroshima	Team
Asian Champions Trophy
Gold medal – first place	2021 Donghae
Silver medal – second place	2023 Ranchi
FIH Nations Cup
Bronze medal – third place	2022 Valencia
Girls' Asia Cup
Silver medal – second place	2016 Bangkok

Miyu Suzuki (鈴木 美結, Suzuki Miyu; born 8 January 1999) is a Japanese field hockey player.

== Personal life ==
Miyu Suzuki was born in the Gifu Prefecture.

== Domestic hockey career ==
In the Japanese national league, Suzuki represents the Sony HC Bravia Ladies.

== International hockey career ==
Suzuki made her senior international debut for the Japanese national team (The Cherry Blossoms) in 2018 at the SOMPO Cup - a four nations competition between Australia, Japan, Korea and the US, which was held in Osaka.

=== FIH Hockey series / FIH World Cup / Nations Cup ===
Suzuki was part of the Japanese team competing at the finals of the 2018-19 FIH Hockey Series, held in Hiroshima in June 2019. She won a silver medal after Japan was defeated 3–1 in the final against India.

Suzuki took part in the 2022 FIH World Cup held in Spain and the Netherlands, where the Japanese team came eleventh, and the 2022 FIH Nations Cup held in Valencia, Spain, where the Japanese team team won Bronze. She also competed in the 2023-24 FIH Hockey Women's Nations Cup in Spain, where the Japanese team came fifth, and the 2024-25 FIH Hockey Women's Nations Cup in Santiago de Chile, where Japan came sixth.

=== Asian Champions Trophy ===
Suzuki was part of the gold medal-winning Japanese team at the 2021 Women's Asian Champions Trophy, in Donghei, Korea, where Japan beat the Korean hosts 2–1 in the final. Her team also won Silver in the 2023 tournament, held Ranchi, India, losing 4–0 to the India hosts in the final

=== Asian Games ===
Suzuki took part in the 2022 Asian Games in Hangzhou, China, where Japan only just missed out on a medal, coming fourth after a sudden death shootout against Korea in their semi final after both teams were tied 2–2 at the end of regular time.

=== Asian Cup ===
Suzuki won gold at the 2022 Asian Cup in Muscat, beating Korea 4–2 in the final.

=== Olympic Games ===
Suzuki took part in the 2024 Olympics in Paris, where the Japanese team came tenth.
