= Zou Meirong =

Chinese field hockey player

Personal information
- Born: 1 September 2000 (age 26) China

Sport
- Sport: Field hockey
- Position: Forward
National team
Years	Team	Caps	Goals
2018	China U–18	14	(17)
2021–	China	43	(13)
Medal record
Women's field hockey
Representing China
Olympic Games
Silver medal – second place	2024 Paris	Team
Asian Games
Gold medal – first place	2022 Hangzhou	Team
Asia Cup
Gold medal – first place	2025 Hangzhou
Asian Champions Trophy
Bronze medal – third place	2021 Donghae
Bronze medal – third place	2023 Ranchi
Youth Olympic Games
Bronze medal – third place	2018 Buenos Aires	Team
Girls' Asia Cup
Gold medal – first place	2016 Bangkok

Zou Meirong (born 1 September 2000) is a field hockey player from China, who plays as a forward.

== Career ==
=== Under–18 ===
Zou made her junior international debut for China in 2018. She represented the national U–18 team at the Youth Olympic Games in Buenos Aires, where she won a bronze medal.

=== National team ===
In 2021, Zou made her international debut for China. She represented her country at the Asian Champions Trophy in Donghae, winning a bronze medal.

She did not represent the national team again until 2023. She appeared during season four of the FIH Pro League, as well as in a test series against Australia in Perth. Later that year she won her first gold medal with the national team, taking home the title at the Asian Games in Hangzhou. A month after the Asian Games, Zou also won bronze at the Asian Champions Trophy in Ranchi.

In 2024, Zou has represented China in season five of the FIH Pro League and at the International Festival of Hockey in Perth.
