= Joosje Burg =

Dutch field hockey player

Personal information
- Born: 29 July 1997 (age 29) Veghel, Netherlands

Sport
- Sport: Field hockey
- Position: Forward
Senior career
Years	Team	Caps	Goals
–	Den Bosch	-	-
National team
Years	Team	Caps	Goals
2016	Netherlands U–21	6	(2)
2021–	Netherlands	18	(8)
Medal record
Women's field hockey
Representing Netherlands
Olympic Games
Gold medal – first place	2024 Paris	Team
World Cup
Silver medal – second place	2026 Wavre/Amstelveen
EuroHockey Championship
Gold medal – first place	2023 Mönchengladbach
Gold medal – first place	2025 Mönchengladbach
FIH Pro League
Silver medal – second place	2021–22
FIH Junior World Cup
Silver medal – second place	2016 Santiago

Joosje Burg (born 29 July 1997) is a Dutch field hockey player.

== Personal life ==
Joosje Burg was born and raised in Veghel.

== Career ==
=== Domestic hockey ===
In the Netherlands' domestic league, the Hoofdklasse, Burg represents Den Bosch.

=== Under–21 ===
In 2016, Burg was a member of the Netherlands U–21 team that won silver at the FIH Junior World Cup in Santiago.

=== National team ===
After being absent from national selections for five years, Burg made her senior international debut in 2021 during season three of the FIH Pro League.
