= Ou Zixia =

Chinese field hockey player

Personal information
- Born: 24 September 1995 (age 30)
- Height: 1.66 m (5 ft 5 in)
- Weight: 63 kg (139 lb)

Sport
- Sport: Field hockey
National team
Years	Team	Caps	Goals
2015–	China	67	-
Medal record
Women's field hockey
Representing China
Olympic Games
Silver medal – second place	2024 Paris	Team
Asian Games
Gold medal – first place	2022 Hangzhou	Team
Bronze medal – third place	2018 Jakarta	Team
Asia Cup
Gold medal – first place	2025 Hangzhou
Asian Champions Trophy
Silver medal – second place	2016 Singapore
Bronze medal – third place	2018 Donghae
Bronze medal – third place	2021 Donghae

Ou Zixia (born 24 September 1995) is a Chinese field hockey player.

She competed for the China women's national field hockey team at the 2016 Summer Olympics.

Olympic Games
Preceded by Su Bingtian	Flagbearer for China at the Olympics closing ceremony (with Li Fabin); Paris 2024	Succeeded by Incumbent
