= Chen Yang (field hockey) =

Chinese field hockey player

Personal information
- Born: 15 February 1997 (age 29)
- Height: 1.68 m (5 ft 6 in)
- Weight: 53 kg (117 lb)

Sport
- Sport: Field hockey
National team
| Years | Team | Caps | Goals |
| – | China | 45 | - |
Medal record
Women's field hockey
Representing China
Olympic Games
| Silver medal – second place | 2024 Paris | Team |
Asian Games
| Gold medal – first place | 2022 Hangzhou | Team |
Asia Cup
| Gold medal – first place | 2025 Hangzhou |
Asian Champions Trophy
| Silver medal – second place | 2016 Singapore |

Chen Yang (Chinese: 陈阳, born 15 February 1997) is a Chinese field hockey player for the Chinese national team.

She participated at the 2018 Women's Hockey World Cup.
