= He Jiangxin =

Chinese field hockey player

Personal information
- Born: 19 August 1997 (age 29)
- Height: 1.60 m (5 ft 3 in)
- Weight: 52 kg (115 lb)

Sport
- Sport: Field hockey
National team
Years	Team	Caps	Goals
2017–	China	15	-
Medal record
Women's field hockey
Representing China
Olympic Games
Silver medal – second place	2024 Paris	Team
Asian Games
Gold medal – first place	2022 Hangzhou	Team
Bronze medal – third place	2018 Jakarta	Team
Asia Cup
Gold medal – first place	2025 Hangzhou
Asian Champions Trophy
Bronze medal – third place	2021 Donghae

He Jiangxin (Chinese: 何江欣, born 19 August 1997) is a Chinese field hockey player for the Chinese national team.

She participated at the 2018 Women's Hockey World Cup.
