= Gongshu Canal Sports Park Field Hockey Field =

Field hockey stadium in Hangzhou, China

- Address: Hangzhou; China
- Capacity: 5000

Construction
- Opened: 2021
- Architect: Archi-Tectonics

Website
- www.hangzhou2022.cn

The Gongshu Canal Sports Park Field Hockey Field is a field hockey stadium built for the 2022 Asian Games in Hangzhou. The 8,697 m2 stadium seats 5,000. It was completed in 2021. It hosted field hockey competitions during the 2022 Asian Games, the blind football competition during the Para Games, and become a visitor reception center after the events end. It is also the host for the 2025 Women's Hockey Asia Cup.

== Features ==
The stadium contains a main venue, warm-up arena and two-storey supporting room. Also known as the “Hangzhou Umbrella,” the stadium's design resembles oil-paper umbrellas. It was designed by Winka Dubbeldam of New York-based architecture firm Archi-Tectonics.

== Usage ==
The Stadium passed the 2022 Asian Games acceptance criteria in November 2021.

It hosted its first hockey match in May 2023 for the 2023 Hangzhou Youth Sports League Hockey Tournament.

It is also the host for the 2025 Women's Hockey Asia Cup.
