= Yang Liu (field hockey) =

Chinese field hockey player

Personal information
- Nationality: China
- Born: 1 September 1998 (age 27)

Sport
- Sport: Field hockey
Medal record
Women's field hockey
Representing China
Olympic Games
Silver medal – second place	2024 Paris	Team
Asia Cup
Gold medal – first place	2025 Hangzhou

Yang Liu (born 1 September 1998) is a Chinese field hockey player. She competed in the 2024 Summer Olympics.
