= Fan Yunxia =

Chinese field hockey player

Personal information
- Nationality: China
- Born: 7 December 2002 (age 23) Huai'an, Jiangsu, China

Sport
- Sport: Field hockey
Medal record
Women's field hockey
Representing China
Olympic Games
Silver medal – second place	2024 Paris	Team
Asia Cup
Gold medal – first place	2025 Hangzhou
Asian Champions Trophy
Silver medal – second place	2024 Rajgir
Youth Olympic Games
Bronze medal – third place	2018 Buenos Aires	Team

Fan Yunxia (born 7 December 2002) is a Chinese field hockey player. She competed in the 2024 Summer Olympics, winning a silver medal.
