= Miyu Hasegawa =

Japanese field hockey player

Personal information
- Born: 20 November 2001 (age 24) Shimane Prefecture, Japan
- Height: 156 cm (5 ft 1 in)
- Weight: 52 kg (115 lb)

Sport
- Sport: Field hockey
- Position: Forward
Senior career
Years	Team	Caps	Goals
–	Tenri University	-	-
National team
Years	Team	Caps	Goals
2023–	Japan	13	(6)
Medal record
Women's field hockey
Representing Japan
Asian Cup
Bronze medal – third place	2025 Hangzhou
Asian Champions Trophy
Silver medal – second place	2023 Ranchi
Bronze medal – third place	2024 Rajgir

Miyu Hasegawa (長谷川 美優, born 20 November 2001) is a Japanese field hockey player.

== Personal life ==
Miyu Hasegawa was born in the Shimane Prefecture.

== Career ==
=== Domestic league ===
In the Japanese national league, Hasegawa represents the Tenri University Bears.

=== Cherry Blossoms ===
Hasegawa made her senior international debut in 2023. She represented the team at the Asian Games in Hangzhou. She followed this up with an appearance at the 2023 Asian Champions Trophy in Ranchi, where she won a silver medal.

She was named in the squad for the 2024 FIH Olympic Qualifiers in Ranchi.
