= Chen Yi (field hockey, born 1997) =

Chinese field hockey player

Medal record

Olympic Games
Silver medal – second place	2024 Paris	Team

Asia Cup
Gold medal – first place	2025 Hangzhou	

Chen Yi (born 28 January 1997) is a Chinese field hockey player for the Chinese national team. She played in the 2020 Summer Olympics.
