= Zhang Ying (field hockey) =

Chinese field hockey player

Personal information
- Nationality: China
- Born: 29 August 1998 (age 28)

Sport
- Sport: Field hockey
Medal record
Women's field hockey
Representing China
Olympic Games
Silver medal – second place	2024 Paris	Team
Asian Games
Gold medal – first place	2022 Hangzhou	Team
Silver medal – second place	2026 Aichi-Nagoya	Team
Asia Cup
Gold medal – first place	2025 Hangzhou
Asian Champions Trophy
Silver medal – second place	2016 Singapore
Bronze medal – third place	2021 Donghae

Zhang Ying (born 29 August 1998) is a Chinese field hockey player. She competed in the 2020 Summer Olympics.
