= Ma Ning (field hockey) =

Chinese field hockey player (born 2000)

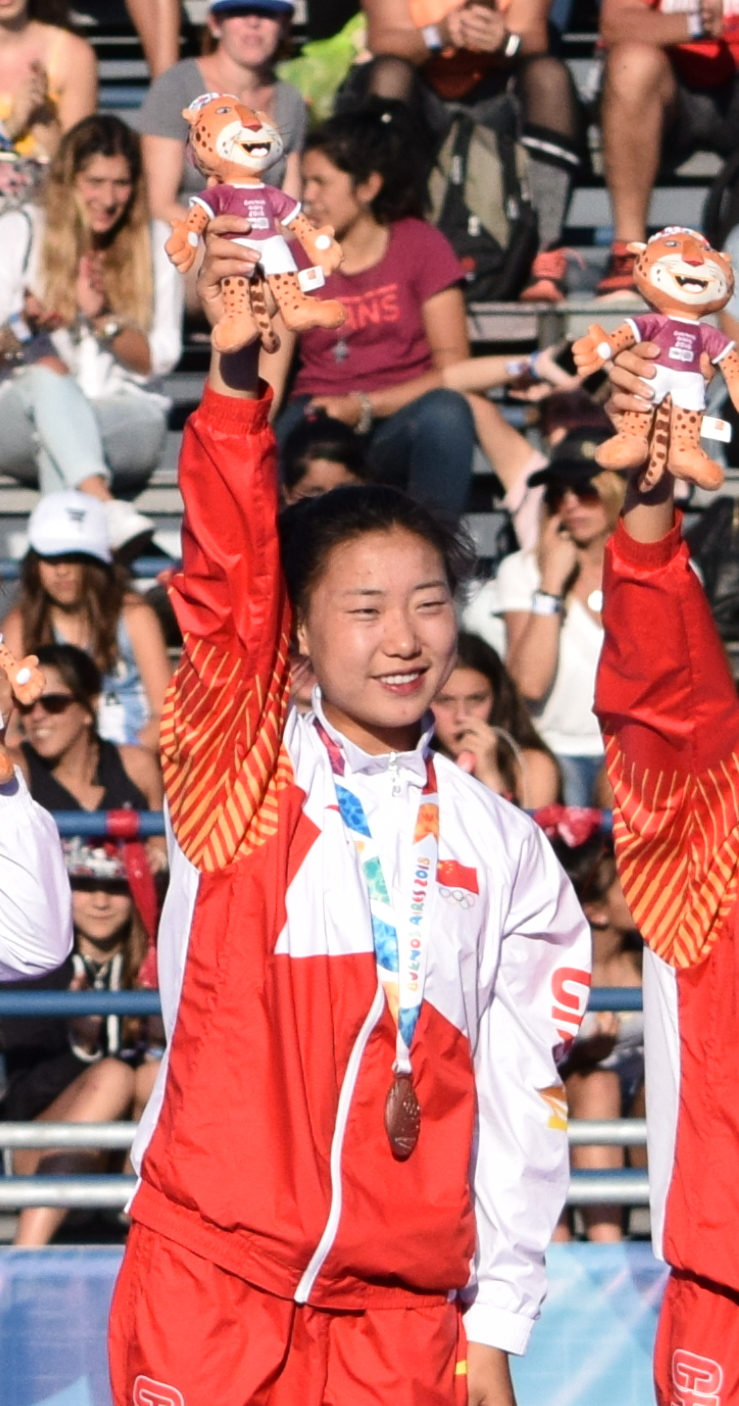
- Ma at the 2018 Summer Youth Olympics – Women's Medallist Ceremony

Personal information
- Born: 29 September 2000 (age 26) China

Sport
- Sport: Field hockey
- Position: Defence
National team
Years	Team	Caps	Goals
2018	China U–18	14	(24)
2021–	China	43	(5)
Medal record
Women's field hockey
Representing China
Olympic Games
Silver medal – second place	2024 Paris	Team
Asian Games
Gold medal – first place	2022 Hangzhou	Team
Asia Cup
Gold medal – first place	2025 Hangzhou
Asian Champions Trophy
Bronze medal – third place	2021 Donghae
Youth Olympic Games
Bronze medal – third place	2018 Buenos Aires	Team
Girls' Asia Cup
Gold medal – first place	2016 Bangkok
- Updated on 30 September 2023

Ma Ning (born 29 September 2000) is a field hockey player from China, who plays as a defender.

== Career ==
=== Under–18 ===
In 2018, Ma captained the Chinese U–18 team to a bronze medal at the Youth Olympics in Buenos Aires.

=== National team ===
Ma made her debut for the national team in 2021 at the Asian Champions Trophy in Donghae City.
