= Shiho Kobayakawa =

Japanese field hockey player

Personal information
- Born: 12 April 1999 (age 27) Shimane Prefecture, Japan
- Height: 162 cm (5 ft 4 in)

Sport
- Sport: Field hockey
- Position: Forward
Senior career
Years	Team	Caps	Goals
–	Coca Cola Red Sparks	-	-
National team
Years	Team	Caps	Goals
2018–	Japan	38	(10)
2020	Japan U–21	4	(1)
Medal record
Women's field hockey
Representing Japan
Asian Cup
Bronze medal – third place	2025 Hangzhou
FIH Hockey Series
Silver medal – second place	2018–19 Hiroshima	Team
Asian Champions Trophy
Silver medal – second place	2018 Donghae
Silver medal – second place	2023 Ranchi
Bronze medal – third place	2024 Rajgir
FIH Nations Cup
Bronze medal – third place	2022 Valencia
Girls' Asia Cup
Silver medal – second place	2016 Bangkok

Shiho Kobayakawa (小早川 志穂, Kobayakawa Shiho; born 12 April 1999) is a Japanese field hockey player.

== Career ==
=== Domestic league ===
In the Japanese national league, Kobayakawa represents the Coca Cola Red Sparks.

=== Under–21 ===
Kobayakawa made her debut for the Japan U–21s in 2020, representing the team in a test series against Australia in Canberra.

=== Cherry Blossoms ===
Kobayakawa made her senior international debut in 2018 at the Asian Champions Trophy in Donghae City.

She has since appeared in numerous international competitions, winning silver at the 2018–19 FIH Series Finals in Hiroshima and the 2023 Asian Champions Trophy in Ranchi, as well as bronze at the 2022 FIH Nations Cup in Valencia.
