= Zhong Jiaqi =

Chinese field hockey player (born 1999)

Personal information
- Born: 23 September 1999 (age 26) Guangzhou, China

Sport
- Sport: Field hockey
National team
Years	Team	Caps	Goals
2016–present	China	51	-
Medal record
Women's field hockey
Representing China
Olympic Games
Silver medal – second place	2024 Paris	Team
Asian Games
Gold medal – first place	2022 Hangzhou	Team
Asia Cup
Gold medal – first place	2025 Hangzhou
Silver medal – second place	2017 Gifu
Asian Champions Trophy
Silver medal – second place	2016 Singapore
Bronze medal – third place	2018 Donghae
Bronze medal – third place	2021 Donghae

Zhong Jiaqi (born 23 September 1999) is a Chinese field hockey player for the Chinese national team.

She participated at the 2018 Women's Hockey World Cup. In December 2019, she was nominated for the FIH Rising Star of the Year Award.
