= Mai Toriyama =

Japanese field hockey player

Personal information
- Born: 13 April 1995 (age 31) Imari, Saga, Japan
- Height: 1.56 m (5 ft 1 in)

Sport
- Sport: Field hockey
- Position: Forward
- Club: Southern Metropolis Silver Shooting Stars
National team
| Years | Team | Caps | Goals |
| – | Japan | | - |
Medal record
Asia Cup
| Gold medal – first place | 2022 Muscat |
| Bronze medal – third place | 2025 Hangzhou |
Asian Champions Trophy
| Gold medal – first place | 2021 Donghae |

Mai Toriyama (鳥山 麻衣, Toriyama Mai; born 13 April 1995) is a Japanese field hockey player for the Japanese national team.
