= Field hockey at the 2024 Summer Olympics – Women's tournament =

Women's field hockey at the 2024 Summer Olympics

Tournament details
- Host country: France
- City: Paris
- Dates: 27 July – 9 August
- Teams: 12 (from 5 confederations)
- Venue: Stade Yves-du-Manoir

Final positions
- Champions: Netherlands (5th title)
- Runner-up: China
- Third place: Argentina

Tournament statistics
- Matches played: 38
- Goals scored: 143 (3.76 per match)
- Top scorer: (Netherlands) Yibbi Jansen (9 goals)
All statistics are correct as of 7 August 2024


The women's field hockey tournament at the 2024 Summer Olympics was the 12th edition of the field hockey event for women at the Summer Olympics. It took place from 27 July to 9 August 2024. All games were played at the Stade Yves-du-Manoir in Paris, France.

The Netherlands took home gold after a finals victory over China on penalties, following a 1-1 draw in the regulation time, for their fifth title, while Argentina took the bronze medal.

== Competition schedule ==
In the preliminary round, games were played on two pitches.

G	Group stage	¼	Quarter-finals	½	Semi-finals	B	Bronze medal match	F	Final

Sat 27	Sun 28	Mon 29	Tue 30	Wed 31	Thu 1	Fri 2	Sat 3	Sun 4	Mon 5	Tue 6	Wed 7	Thu 8	Fri 9	
G	G	G		G	G	G	G		¼		½		B	F

== Competition format ==
The twelve teams in the tournament were divided into two groups of six, with each team initially playing round-robin games within their group. Following the completion of the round-robin stage, the top four teams from each group advanced to the quarter-finals. The two semi-final winners met for the gold medal match, while the semi-final losers played in the bronze medal match.

== Qualification ==
Each of the Continental Champions from five confederations received an automatic berth. France as the host nation also qualified automatically. The other teams qualified through the 2024 Women's FIH Hockey Olympic Qualifiers.

Qualification	Date	Host/Country	Berths	Qualified team
Host country	—N/a		1	France
2023 Oceania Cup	10–13 August 2023	Whangārei	1	Australia
2023 EuroHockey Championship	18–26 August 2023	Mönchengladbach	1	Netherlands
2022 Asian Games	25 September − 7 October 2023	Hangzhou	1	China
2023 Pan American Games	26 October – 4 November 2023	Santiago	1	Argentina
2023 African Olympic Qualifier	29 October – 5 November 2023	Pretoria	1	South Africa
2024 FIH Hockey Olympic Qualifiers	13–20 January 2024	Ranchi	3	Germany; United States; Japan
2024 FIH Hockey Olympic Qualifiers	13–20 January 2024	Valencia	3	Belgium; Spain; Great Britain
Total			12	

== Umpires ==
On 12 September 2023, 14 umpires were appointed by the FIH.

- Irene Presenqui (ARG)
- Aleisha Neumann (AUS)
- Laurine Delforge (BEL)
- Liu Xiaoying (CHN)
- Hannah Harrison (GBR)
- Rachel Williams (GBR)
- Sarah Wilson (GBR)
- Alison Keogh (IRE)
- Emi Yamada (JPN)
- Amber Church (NZL)
- Cookie Tan (SGP)
- Annelize Rostron (RSA)
- Wanri Venter (RSA)
- Ayanna McClean (TTO)

== Group stage ==
The pools were announced on 22 January 2024. The match schedule was announced on 6 March 2024.

All times are local (UTC+2).

=== Group A ===
Pos	Team	Pld	W	D	L	GF	GA	GD	Pts	Qualification
1	Netherlands	5	5	0	0	19	5	+14	15	Quarter-finals
2	Belgium	5	4	0	1	13	4	+9	12	Quarter-finals
3	Germany	5	3	0	2	12	7	+5	9	Quarter-finals
4	China	5	2	0	3	15	10	+5	6	Quarter-finals
5	Japan	5	1	0	4	2	15	−13	3	
6	France (H)	5	0	0	5	4	24	−20	0	

Source: FIH
Rules for classification: 1) points; 2) matches won; 3) goal difference; 4) goals for; 5) head-to-head result; 6) field goals scored.
(H) Hosts

27 July 2024
20:15
v

Netherlands	6–2	France
Matla 29'; Jansen 32', 35', 45', 48'; Burg 50'	Report	Lhopital 35'; Le Nindre 46'

Pitch 2
Umpires:
Ayanna McClean (TTO)
Cookie Tan (SGP)

28 July 2024
10:00
v

Belgium	2–1	China
Ballenghien 23'; Englebert 55'	Report	Chen Ya. 46'

Pitch 1
Umpires:
Hannah Harrison (GBR)
Amber Church (NZL)

28 July 2024
10:30
v

Germany	2–0	Japan
Stapenhorst 12'; Lorenz 56'	Report

Pitch 2
Umpires:
Alison Keogh (IRE)
Sarah Wilson (GBR)

29 July 2024
10:30
v

Japan	0–5	China
	Report	Zhong 16'; Li 19'; Ma 23'; Gu 24', 55'

Pitch 2
Umpires:
Annelize Rostron (RSA)
Wanri Venter (RSA)

29 July 2024
19:45
v

Germany	1–2	Netherlands
Stapenhorst 44'	Report	Jansen 50'; Veen 54'

Pitch 1
Umpires:
Amber Church (NZL)
Aleisha Neumann (AUS)

29 July 2024
20:15
v

France	0–5	Belgium
	Report	Rasir 7'; Ballenghien 12', 52'; Gerniers 18'; Vanden Borre 37'

Pitch 2
Umpires:
Liu Xiaoying (CHN)
Raghu Prasad (IND)

31 July 2024
12:45
v

France	1–5	Germany
Lhopital 51'	Report	Lorenz 3', 52', 53'; Stapenhorst 11'; Wortmann 28'

Pitch 1
Umpires:
Annelize Rostron (RSA)
Emi Yamada (JPN)

31 July 2024
17:00
v

Belgium	3–0	Japan
Brasseur 28'; Englebert 29'; Ballenghien 52'	Report

Pitch 1
Umpires:
Gabriel Labate (ARG)
Ayanna McClean (TTO)

31 July 2024
20:15
v

Netherlands	3–0	China
Moes 3'; Veen 15'; Verschoor 46'	Report

Pitch 2
Umpires:
Laurine Delforge (BEL)
Irene Presenqui (ARG)

1 August 2024
19:45
v

Japan	1–0	France
Toriyama 12'

Pitch 1
Umpires:
Rachel Williams (GBR)
Aleisha Neumann (AUS)

2 August 2024
10:00
v

China	2–4	Germany
Dan 36'; Zou 55'	Report	Lorenz 12', 49'; Stapenhorst 17', 18'

Pitch 1
Umpires:
Sarah Wilson (GBR)
Annelize Rostron (RSA)

2 August 2024
12:45
v

Belgium	1–3	Netherlands
Ballenghien 35'	Report	Sanders 6'; Jansen 13'; Verschoor 30'

Pitch 1
Umpires:
Hannah Harrison (GBR)
Liu Xiaoying (CHN)

3 August 2024
10:30
v

Netherlands	5–1	Japan
Jansen 4'; Matla 9', 40'; Burg 14'; Veen 53'	Report	Kobayakawa 23'

Pitch 2
Umpires:
Rachel Williams (GBR)
Sarah Wilson (GBR)

3 August 2024
17:00
v

China	7–1	France
Li 9', 25'; Chen Ya. 16', 55'; Zhong 33'; Zhang 41'; Dan 48'	Report	Delemazure 22'

Pitch 1
Umpires:
Alison Keogh (IRE)
Aleisha Neumann (AUS)

3 August 2024
19:45
v

Germany	0–2	Belgium
	Report	Struijk 13'; Ballenghien 17'

Pitch 1
Umpires:
Irene Presenqui (ARG)
Wanri Venter (RSA)

=== Group B ===
Pos	Team	Pld	W	D	L	GF	GA	GD	Pts	Qualification
1	Australia	5	4	1	0	15	5	+10	13	Quarter-finals
2	Argentina	5	4	1	0	16	7	+9	13	Quarter-finals
3	Spain	5	2	1	2	6	7	−1	7	Quarter-finals
4	Great Britain	5	2	0	3	8	12	−4	6	Quarter-finals
5	United States	5	1	1	3	5	13	−8	4	
6	South Africa	5	0	0	5	4	10	−6	0	

Source: FIH
Rules for classification: 1) points; 2) matches won; 3) goal difference; 4) goals for; 5) head-to-head result; 6) field goals scored.

27 July 2024
19:45
v

Argentina	4–1	United States
Sánchez Moccia 18'; Gorzelany 29'; Jankunas 44'; Díaz 47'	Report	Sessa 33'

Pitch 1
Umpires:
Aleisha Neumann (AUS)
Wanri Venter (RSA)

28 July 2024
12:45
v

Australia	2–1	South Africa
Kershaw 16'; T. Stewart 40'	Report	De Waal 14'

Pitch 1
Umpires:
Emi Yamada (JPN)
Rachel Williams (GBR)

28 July 2024
13:15
v

Great Britain	1–2	Spain
Ansley 4'	Report	L. Barrios 4'; Riera 9'

Pitch 2
Umpires:
Annelize Rostron (RSA)
Liu Xiaoying (CHN)

29 July 2024
13:15
v

Spain	1–1	United States
García 20'	Report	Gladieux 14'

Pitch 2
Umpires:
Cookie Tan (SGP)
Rachel Williams (GBR)

29 July 2024
17:00
v

Great Britain	0–4	Australia
	Report	Greiner 17'; Arnott 19'; T. Stewart 46'; G. Stewart 52'

Pitch 1
Umpires:
Alison Keogh (IRE)
Irene Presenqui (ARG)

29 July 2024
17:30
v

South Africa	2–4	Argentina
Louw 15'; De Waal 29'	Report	Gorzelany 17', 49', 52'; Jankunas 53'

Pitch 2
Umpires:
Ayanna McClean (TTO)
Laurine Delforge (BEL)

31 July 2024
10:00
v

Argentina	2–1	Spain
Gorzelany 6'; Trinchinetti 21'	Report	Riera 34'

Pitch 1
Umpires:
Hannah Harrison (GBR)
Alison Keogh (IRE)

31 July 2024
10:30
v

South Africa	1–2	Great Britain
De Waal 6'	Report	Costello 19'; French 42'

Pitch 2
Umpires:
Amber Church (NZL)
Cookie Tan (SGP)

31 July 2024
13:15
v

Australia	3–0	United States
Taylor 3'; Arnott 29'; Brooks 53'	Report

Pitch 2
Umpires:
Liu Xiaoying (CHN)
Rachel Williams (GBR)

1 August 2024
17:00
v

United States	2–5	Great Britain
Tamer 7', 29'	Report	Hamilton 4'; Howard 14', 25'; French 35'; Jones 39'

Pitch 1
Umpires:
Steve Rodgers (AUS)
Ayanna McClean (TTO)

1 August 2024
17:30
v

Spain	1–0	South Africa
Iglesias 15'	Report

Pitch 2
Umpires:
Emi Yamada (JPN)
Hannah Harrison (GBR)

1 August 2024
20:15
v

Argentina	3–3	Australia
Casas 10'; Sauze 10'; Granatto 50'	Report	Nobbs 37'; Kershaw 45+'; Williams 60'

Pitch 2
Umpires:
Wanri Venter (RSA)
Amber Church (NZL)

3 August 2024
10:00
v

Great Britain	0–3	Argentina
	Report	Raposo 34'; Albertario 35'; Díaz 55'

Pitch 1
Umpires:
Laurine Delforge (BEL)
Emi Yamada (JPN)

3 August 2024
12:45
v

Australia	3–1	Spain
Arnott 2'; Kershaw 55'; Nobbs 59'	Report	Riera 43'

Pitch 1
Umpires:
Ayanna McClean (TTO)
Amber Church (NZL)

3 August 2024
13:15
v

United States	1–0	South Africa
Sholder 43'	Report

Pitch 2
Umpires:
Hannah Harrison (GBR)
Cookie Tan (SGP)

== Knockout stage ==
=== Bracket ===
Quarter-finals
5 August
Netherlands	3
Great Britain	1
5 August
Argentina (p.s.o.)	1 (2)
Germany	1 (0)
5 August
Belgium	2
Spain	0
5 August
Australia	2
China	3

Semi-finals
7 August
Netherlands	3
Argentina	0
7 August
Belgium	1 (2)
China (p.s.o.)	1 (3)

Gold medal match
9 August
Netherlands (p.s.o.)	1 (3)
China	1 (1)
Bronze medal match
9 August
Argentina (p.s.o.)	2 (3)
Belgium	2 (1)

=== Quarter-finals ===
5 August 2024
10:00
v

Australia	2–3	China
Arnott 10'; T. Stewart 45'	Report	Ma 11'; Dan 20'; Zhong 35'

Pitch 1
Umpires:
Annelize Rostron (RSA)
Wanri Venter (RSA)

5 August 2024
12:30
v

Argentina	1–1	Germany
Jankunas 59'	Report; Penalty shootout report	Huse 57'
Penalties
Casas (penalty shoot-out missed); Jankunas (penalty shoot-out scored); Díaz (penalty shoot-out scored)	2–0	(penalty shoot-out missed) Weidemann; (penalty shoot-out missed) Huse; (penalty shoot-out missed) Schröder; (penalty shoot-out missed) Zimmermann

Pitch 1
Umpires:
Laurine Delforge (BEL)
Aleisha Neumann (AUS)

5 August 2024
17:30
v

Netherlands	3–1	Great Britain
De Waard 1'; Fokke 30', 46'	Report	French 20'

Pitch 1
Umpires:
Liu Xiaoying (CHN)
Irene Presenqui (ARG)

5 August 2024
20:00
v

Belgium	2–0	Spain
Marien 46'; Englebert 49'	Report

Pitch 1
Umpires:
Alison Keogh (IRE)
Ayanna McClean (TTO)

=== Semi-finals ===
7 August 2024
14:00
v

Netherlands	3–0	Argentina
Fokke 21'; Nunnink 26'; Jansen 35'	Report

Pitch 1
Umpires:
Laurine Delforge (BEL)
Sarah Wilson (GBR)

7 August 2024
19:00
v

Belgium	1–1	China
Puvrez 59'	Report; Penalty shootout report	Zou 18'
Penalties
Englebert (penalty shoot-out scored); Blockmans (penalty shoot-out scored); Ballenghien (penalty shoot-out missed); Rasir (penalty shoot-out missed); Marien (penalty shoot-out missed)	2–3	(penalty shoot-out missed) Chen Ya. (penalty shoot-out scored) He; (penalty shoot-out scored) Zou; (penalty shoot-out scored) Ma

Pitch 1
Umpires:
Amber Church (NZL)
Aleisha Neumann (AUS)

=== Bronze medal match ===
9 August 2024
14:00
v

(bronze) Argentina	2–2	Belgium
Gorzelany 22'; Albertarrio 27'	Report; Penalty shootout report	Puvrez 8'; Rasir 27'
Penalties
Casas (penalty shoot-out scored); Jankunas (penalty shoot-out missed); Díaz (penalty shoot-out scored); Cairo (penalty shoot-out scored)	3–1	(penalty shoot-out missed) Englebert; (penalty shoot-out missed) Blockmans; (penalty shoot-out scored) Rasir; (penalty shoot-out missed) Vanden Borre

Pitch 1
Umpires:
Amber Church (NZL)
Alison Keogh (IRE)

=== Gold medal match ===
9 August 2024
20:00
v

(gold) Netherlands	1–1	China (silver)
Jansen 51'	Report; Penalty shootout report	Chen Yi 6'
Penalties
Sanders (penalty shoot-out scored); Verschoor (penalty shoot-out scored); Moes (penalty shoot-out missed); Veen (penalty shoot-out scored)	3–1	(penalty shoot-out missed) He; (penalty shoot-out missed) Zou; (penalty shoot-out scored) Zhong; (penalty shoot-out missed) Ma

Stade Yves-du-Manoir
Attendance: 14,000
Umpires:
Sarah Wilson (GBR)
Laurine Delforge (BEL)

== Final ranking ==
As per statistical convention in field hockey, matches decided in regular time are counted as wins and losses, while matches decided by penalty shoot-outs are counted as draws.

Pos	Team	Pld	W	D	L	GF	GA	GD	Pts	Final result
1	Netherlands	8	7	1	0	26	7	+19	22	Gold medal
2	China	8	3	2	3	20	14	+6	11	Silver medal
3	Argentina	8	4	3	1	19	13	+6	15	Bronze medal
4	Belgium	8	5	2	1	18	7	+11	17	Fourth place
5	Australia	6	4	1	1	17	8	+9	13	Eliminated in quarter-finals
6	Germany	6	3	1	2	13	8	+5	10	Eliminated in quarter-finals
7	Spain	6	2	1	3	6	9	−3	7	Eliminated in quarter-finals
8	Great Britain	6	2	0	4	9	15	−6	6	Eliminated in quarter-finals
9	United States	5	1	1	3	5	13	−8	4	Eliminated in group stage
10	Japan	5	1	0	4	2	15	−13	3	Eliminated in group stage
11	South Africa	5	0	0	5	4	10	−6	0	Eliminated in group stage
12	France (H)	5	0	0	5	4	24	−20	0	Eliminated in group stage

Source: Olympics
(H) Hosts

== Goalscorers ==
There were 143 goals scored in 38 matches, for an average of 3.76 goals per match.

9 goals

- (Netherlands) Yibbi Jansen

6 goals

- (Argentina) Agustina Gorzelany
- (Belgium) Ambre Ballenghien
- (Germany) Nike Lorenz

5 goals

- (Germany) Charlotte Stapenhorst

4 goals

- (Australia) Alice Arnott

3 goals

- (Argentina) Julieta Jankunas
- (Australia) Stephanie Kershaw
- (Australia) Tatum Stewart
- (Belgium) Charlotte Englebert
- (China) Chen Yang
- (China) Dan Wen
- (China) Li Hong
- (China) Zhong Jiaqi
- (United Kingdom) Hannah French
- (Netherlands) Luna Fokke
- (Netherlands) Frédérique Matla
- (Netherlands) Marijn Veen
- (South Africa) Kayla de Waal
- (Spain) Lola Riera

2 goals

- (Argentina) Agustina Albertario
- (Argentina) Zoe Díaz
- (Australia) Kaitlin Nobbs
- (Belgium) Emma Puvrez
- (Belgium) Justine Rasir
- (China) Gu Bingfeng
- (China) Ma Ning
- (China) Zou Meirong
- (France) Yohanna Lhopital
- (United Kingdom) Tessa Howard
- (Netherlands) Joosje Burg
- (Netherlands) Maria Verschoor
- (United States) Abigail Tamer

1 goal

- (Argentina) Lara Casas
- (Argentina) María José Granatto
- (Argentina) Valentina Raposo
- (Argentina) Rocío Sánchez Moccia
- (Argentina) Victoria Sauze
- (Argentina) Eugenia Trinchinetti
- (Australia) Maddison Brooks
- (Australia) Rebecca Greiner
- (Australia) Grace Stewart
- (Australia) Renee Taylor
- (Australia) Mariah Williams
- (Belgium) Hélène Brasseur
- (Belgium) Alix Gerniers
- (Belgium) Delphine Marien
- (Belgium) Michelle Struijk
- (Belgium) Stéphanie Vanden Borre
- (China) Chen Yi
- (China) Zhang Ying
- (France) Philippine Delemazure
- (France) Paola Le Nindre
- (Germany) Viktoria Huse
- (Germany) Amelie Wortmann
- (United Kingdom) Giselle Ansley
- (United Kingdom) Amy Costello
- (United Kingdom) Sophie Hamilton
- (United Kingdom) Sarah Jones
- (Japan) Shiho Kobayakawa
- (Japan) Mai Toriyama
- (Netherlands) Freeke Moes
- (Netherlands) Laura Nunnink
- (Netherlands) Pien Sanders
- (Netherlands) Xan de Waard
- (South Africa) Marié Louw
- (Spain) Laura Barrios
- (Spain) Begoña García
- (Spain) Belén Iglesias
- (United States) Sophia Gladieux
- (United States) Ashley Sessa
- (United States) Meredith Sholder

Source: Olympics
