= Field hockey at the 2016 Summer Olympics – Women's team squads =

There were twelve national teams competing in the women's Olympic field hockey tournament at the 2016 Summer Olympics in Rio de Janeiro. Sixteen players were officially enrolled in each squad. Two reserve players could also be nominated to be available should a player enrolled in the official squad become injured during the tournament.

== Pool A ==
=== China ===
The following is the China roster in the women's field hockey tournament of the 2016 Summer Olympics.

Head coach: Cho Myung-jun

1. Li Dongxiao (GK)
2. Wang Mengyu
5. Li Jiaqi
6. De Jiaojiao
7. Cui Qiuxia (C)
8. Yu Qian
10. Peng Yang
11. Liang Meiyu
12. Wang Na
15. Zhang Jinrong
16. Ou Zixia
17. Li Hongxia
18. Wu Qiong
19. Zhang Xiaoxue
20. Sun Xiao
21. Zhao Yudiao
22. Song Qingling

Reserves:

- Guo Jiajia (GK)

=== Germany ===
The following is the German roster in the women's field hockey tournament of the 2016 Summer Olympics. Annika Sprink was replaced due to an injury by Katharina Otte on 18 August 2016.

Head coach: Jamilon Mülders

4. Nike Lorenz
5. Selin Oruz
8. Anne Schröder
11. Lisa Schütze
12. Charlotte Stapenhorst
13. Katharina Otte
14. Janne Müller-Wieland
15. Hannah Krüger
17. Jana Teschke
18. Lisa Hahn
21. Franzisca Hauke
22. Cécile Pieper
23. Marie Mävers
24. Annika Sprink
28. Julia Müller
29. Pia-Sophie Oldhafer
32. Kristina Reynolds (GK)

Reserves

- Yvonne Frank (GK)

=== Netherlands ===
The following is the Netherlands roster in the women's field hockey tournament of the 2016 Summer Olympics.

Head coach: Alyson Annan

No.	Pos.	Player	Date of birth (age)	Caps	Goals	Club
1	GK	Joyce Sombroek	10 September 1990 (aged 25)			
3	FW	Xan de Waard	8 November 1995 (aged 20)			
4	FW	Kitty van Male	5 June 1988 (aged 28)			
6	MF	Laurien Leurink	13 November 1994 (aged 21)			
7	DF	Willemijn Bos	2 May 1988 (aged 28)			
8	MF	Marloes Keetels	4 May 1993 (aged 23)			
9	MF	Carlien Dirkse van den Heuvel	16 April 1987 (aged 29)			
10	FW	Kelly Jonker	23 May 1990 (aged 26)			
11	MF	Maria Verschoor	22 April 1994 (aged 22)			
12	MF	Lidewij Welten	16 July 1990 (aged 26)			
13	DF	Caia van Maasakker	5 April 1989 (aged 27)			
17	DF	Maartje Paumen	19 September 1985 (aged 30)			
18	MF	Naomi van As	26 July 1983 (aged 33)			
19	FW	Ellen Hoog	26 March 1986 (aged 30)			
23	DF	Margot van Geffen	23 November 1989 (aged 26)			
24	MF	Eva de Goede	23 March 1989 (aged 27)			

=== New Zealand ===
The following is the New Zealand roster in the women's field hockey tournament of the 2016 Summer Olympics.

Head coach: Mark Hager

No.	Pos.	Player	Date of birth (age)	Caps	Goals	Club
1	MF	Kayla Whitelock (C)	30 October 1985 (aged 30)	247	62	(New Zealand) Central
4	FW	Olivia Merry	16 March 1992 (aged 24)	132	51	(New Zealand) Canterbury
6	FW	Petrea Webster	30 March 1988 (aged 28)	144	36	(New Zealand) North Harbour
8	GK	Sally Rutherford	5 June 1981 (aged 35)	118	0	(New Zealand) Midlands
9	DF	Brooke Neal	4 July 1992 (aged 24)	88	5	(New Zealand) Northland
13	DF	Sam Charlton	7 December 1991 (aged 24)	171	5	(New Zealand) Midlands
16	DF	Liz Thompson	8 December 1994 (aged 21)	114	9	(New Zealand) Auckland
17	FW	Sophie Cocks	25 July 1994 (aged 22)	107	28	(New Zealand) Canterbury
18	FW	Kirsten Pearce	10 April 1991 (aged 25)	53	18	(New Zealand) North Harbour
22	MF	Gemma Flynn	2 May 1990 (aged 26)	238	68	(New Zealand) Midlands
23	FW	Charlotte Harrison	31 July 1989 (aged 27)	214	63	(New Zealand) Auckland
24	DF	Rose Keddell	31 January 1994 (aged 22)	128	9	(New Zealand) Midlands
25	MF	Kelsey Smith	12 August 1994 (aged 21)	20	3	(New Zealand) Capital
26	DF	Pippa Hayward	23 May 1990 (aged 26)	109	11	(New Zealand) Canterbury
31	MF	Stacey Michelsen	18 February 1991 (aged 25)	208	24	(New Zealand) Northland
32	MF	Anita McLaren	2 October 1987 (aged 28)	239	94	(New Zealand) Capital

=== South Korea ===
The following is the South Korea roster in the women's field hockey tournament of the 2016 Summer Olympics.

Head coach: Han Jin-soo

1. Jang Soo-ji (GK)
4. Seo Jung-eun
7. Park Seung-a
8. An Hyo-ju
9. Han Hye-lyoung (C)
10. Park Mi-hyun
11. Kim Jong-eun
13. Cheon Eun-bi
16. Cho Hye-jin
18. Kim Bo-mi
20. Kim Hyun-ji
21. Hong Yoo-jin
22. Jang Hee-sun
23. Lee Young-sil
25. Park Ki-ju
26. Baek Ee-seul

Reserves:

- Jung Hea-bin (GK)
- Lee Yu-rim

=== Spain ===
The following is the Spain roster in the women's field hockey tournament of the 2016 Summer Olympics.

Head coach: Adrian Lock

1. María López (GK)
2. Rocío Gutiérrez
3. Rocío Ybarra (C)
7. Carlota Petchamé
8. Carola Salvatella
9. María López
10. Berta Bonastre
11. Cristina Guinea
17. Lola Riera
20. Xantal Giné
21. Beatriz Pérez
22. Gloria Comerma
23. Georgina Oliva
24. Begoña García
25. Alicia Magaz
29. Lucía Jiménez Vicente

Reserves:

- Júlia Pons
- María Ángeles Ruiz

== Pool B ==
=== Argentina ===
The following is the Argentina roster in the women's field hockey tournament of the 2016 Summer Olympics.

Head coach: Gabriel Minadeo

No.	Pos.	Player	Date of birth (age)	Caps	Goals	Club
1	GK	Belén Succi	16 October 1985 (aged 30)	167		(Argentina) CASI
3	DF	Victoria Zuloaga	14 February 1989 (aged 27)	62		(Argentina) Mar del Plata Club
7	FW	Martina Cavallero	7 May 1990 (aged 26)	150		(Argentina) Hurling
11	FW	Carla Rebecchi (c)	7 September 1984 (aged 31)	277		(Argentina) Ciudad de Buenos Aires
12	FW	Delfina Merino	15 October 1989 (aged 26)	218		(Argentina) Banco Provincia
14	DF	Agustina Habif	8 March 1992 (aged 24)	80		(Argentina) GEBA
15	FW	María José Granatto	21 April 1995 (aged 21)	37		(Argentina) Santa Bárbara
16	MF	Florencia Habif	22 August 1993 (aged 22)	132		(Netherlands) Pinoké
17	MF	Rocío Sánchez Moccia	2 August 1988 (aged 28)	173		(Argentina) Liceo Naval
19	FW	Agustina Albertarrio	1 January 1993 (aged 23)	84		(Argentina) Lomas
20	MF	Lucina von der Heyde	24 January 1997 (aged 19)	18		(Argentina) River Plate
23	MF	Pilar Campoy	6 October 1990 (aged 25)	29		(Argentina) Hacoaj
25	MF	Gabriela Aguirre	19 February 1986 (aged 30)	84		(Argentina) Banco Provincia
27	DF	Noel Barrionuevo	16 May 1984 (aged 32)	274		(Argentina) Ciudad de Buenos Aires
29	DF	Julia Gomes Fantasia	30 April 1992 (aged 24)	95		(Argentina) GEBA
31	GK	Florencia Mutio	20 November 1984 (aged 31)	48		(Argentina) San Fernando

Reserves:

- Paula Ortiz
- Pilar Romang

=== Australia ===
The following is the Australia roster in the women's field hockey tournament of the 2016 Summer Olympics.

Head coach: Adam Commens

1. Gabrielle Nance
3. Brooke Peris
4. Casey Sablowski
6. Kirstin Dwyer
7. Jodie Kenny
11. Karri McMahon
12. Madonna Blyth (C)
13. Edwina Bone
17. Georgina Morgan
18. Jane Claxton
19. Georgie Parker
20. Kathryn Slattery
24. Mariah Williams
26. Emily Smith
27. Rachael Lynch (GK)
30. Grace Stewart

Reserves:

- TBD
- TBD

=== Great Britain ===
The following is the Great Britain roster in the women's field hockey tournament of the 2016 Summer Olympics.

Head coach: Danny Kerry

No.	Pos.	Player	Date of birth (age)	Caps	Goals	Club
1	GK	Maddie Hinch	8 October 1988 (aged 27)			
4	DF	Laura Unsworth	8 March 1988 (aged 28)			
5	DF	Crista Cullen	20 August 1985 (aged 30)			
6	FW	Hannah Macleod	9 June 1984 (aged 32)			
7	MF	Georgie Twigg	21 November 1990 (aged 25)			
8	MF	Helen Richardson-Walsh	23 September 1981 (aged 34)			
9	MF	Susannah Townsend	28 July 1989 (aged 27)			
11	DF	Kate Richardson-Walsh (C)	9 May 1980 (aged 36)			
13	DF	Sam Quek	18 October 1988 (aged 27)			
15	FW	Alex Danson	21 May 1985 (aged 31)			
18	DF	Giselle Ansley	31 March 1992 (aged 24)			
19	FW	Sophie Bray	12 May 1990 (aged 26)			
20	DF	Hollie Webb	19 September 1990 (aged 25)			
24	MF	Shona McCallin	18 May 1992 (aged 24)			
26	FW	Lily Owsley	10 December 1994 (aged 21)			
28	MF	Nicola White	20 January 1988 (aged 28)			

=== India ===
The following is the Indian roster in the women's field hockey tournament of the 2016 Summer Olympics.

Head coach: Neil Hawgood

1. Navjot Kaur
3. Deep Grace Ekka
4. Monika Malik
8. Nikki Pradhan
10. Anuradha Devi
11. Savita Punia (GK)
15. Poonam Rani
16. Vandana Kataria
17. Deepika Thakur
19. Namita Toppo
24. Renuka Yadav
26. Sunita Lakra
27. Sushila Chanu (C)
28. Rani Rampal
30. Preeti Dubey
31. Lilima Minz

Reserves:

- Rajani Etimarpu

=== Japan ===
The following is the Japan roster in the women's field hockey tournament of the 2016 Summer Olympics.

Head coach: Yuji Nagai

1. Sakiyo Asano (GK)
2. Nagisa Hayashi
5. Miyuki Nakagawa (C)
6. Maki Sakaguchi
7. Aki Mitsuhashi
8. Ayaka Nishimura
9. Yuri Nagai
10. Mie Nakashima
11. Akane Shibata
13. Yukari Mano
14. Emi Nishikori
16. Mayumi Ono
22. Motomi Kawamura
30. Minami Shimizu
31. Hazuki Nagai
32. Hazuki Yuda

Reserves:

- Kano Nomura
- Yu Asai
- Ryoko Oie (GK)

=== United States ===
The following is the United States roster in the women's field hockey tournament of the 2016 Summer Olympics.

Head coach: Craig Parnham

2. Stefanie Fee
5. Melissa González
7. Kelsey Kolojejchick
8. Rachel Dawson
9. Michelle Vittese
10. Jill Witmer
12. Julia Reinprecht
14. Katie Reinprecht
16. Katie O'Donnell
18. Michelle Kasold
23. Katelyn Falgowski
24. Kathleen Sharkey
27. Lauren Crandall
28. Caitlin Van Snickle
29. Alyssa Manley
31. Jaclyn Briggs (GK)

Reserves:

21. Paige Selenski
6. Alesha Widdall (GK)
