= Field hockey at the 2013 East Asian Games – Women's tournament =

Field hockey at the 2013 East Asian Games
Tournament details
- Host country: China
- City: Tianjin
- Dates: 6–12 October
- Teams: 4
- Venue: Tianjin Olympic Center

Medalists
gold medal	Japan
silver medal	China
bronze medal	Chinese Taipei

Tournament statistics
- Matches played: 8
- Goals scored: 61 (7.63 per match)
- Top scorer: (Japan) Mazuki Arai (6 goals)

The women's field hockey tournament at the 2013 East Asian Games was the third and final edition of the field hockey tournament at the East Asian Games. The tournament took place over a six-day period, beginning on 6 October, culminating with medal finals on 12 October. All games were played at the Tianjin Olympic Center in Tianjin, China.

Japan won the tournament, defeating China 4–3 in the final. Chinese Taipei finished in third place after defeating Hong Kong 4–2 in the third place playoff.

== Competition format ==
The four nations competed in a single round-robin format to determine group standings. At the conclusion of the group matches, the top two teams competed in the gold-medal match, while the teams placed third and fourth played off for bronze.

== Teams ==
The following teams participated in the tournament:

China

Head coach: Weng Haiqin

1. Ye Jiao (GK)
2. Wang Mengyu
3. Mao Weilin (C)
7. Cui Qiuxia
8. Wu Mengrong
9. Liang Xue
10. Liu Lina
11. Li Jiaqi
12. Wang Na
15. Hao Weljia
16. Yao Lili
19. Zhang Xiaoxue
20. Sun Xiao
23. De Jiaojiao
28. Liang Meiyu
29. Peng Yang
Chinese Taipei

Head coach: Lin Min-Nan

1. Lee Shing-Ling (GK)
7. Chen Chen-Tzu
8. Wu Min-Hsuan
9. Yang Wan-Wen
10. Chen Hsiu-Chin
11. Liu Yu-Chen
13. Shih Shu-Hsin (C)
14. Lin Yi-Ching
15. Liu Yu-Chi
16. Huang Shih-Han
17. Hsu Hsin-Yun
18. Chen Wan-Yun (GK)
20. Tseng Wan-Ju
21. Su Pei-Ling
22. Yang Chia-Hua
25. Chen Tsai-Yu
Hong Kong

Head coach: (New Zealand) Tina Bell-Kake

1. Yip Ting-Wai (GK)
2. Wong Teen-Wai Grace
3. Tiffany Chan
4. Nicola Bruce
5. Cheung Ka-Po
7. Samantha Hill (C)
8. Sharon Leung
9. Ho Weeraya
10. Chan Ching-Nam
11. Elianne Vos
12. Chan Ka-Yee
13. Lai Win-Yin
14. Lau Pui-Sze
15. Lo I-Ka
17. Kirsten McNeil
21. Rachel Lau
Japan

Head coach: (South Korea) Yu Seung-Jin

1. Ryoko Oie (GK)
2. Emi Nishikori
3. Shiho Sakai
4. Mayumi Ono
5. Akiko Ota
6. Hazuki Nagai
7. Miyuki Nakagawa (C)
9. Aki Mitsuhashi
10. Mazuki Arai
12. Ayaka Nishimura
14. Aya Ueda
15. Yuri Nagai
17. Shiho Otsuka
19. Keiko Manabe
20. Shihori Oikawa
22. Akane Shibata

== Officials ==
The following umpires were appointed by the Asian Hockey Federation and the FIH to officiate the tournament:

- Nur Hafizah Azman (MAS)
- Ikumi Negishi (JPN)
- Melanie Oakden (NZL)
- Tang Shi-Him (HKG)
- Kamolrat Thongkanarak (THA)
- Tian Yimiao (CHN)

== Results ==
All times are local (UTC+08:00).

=== Group stage ===
Pos	Team	Pld	W	D	L	GF	GA	GD	Pts	Qualification
1	Japan	3	2	1	0	23	1	+22	7	Final
2	China (H)	3	2	1	0	19	1	+18	7	Final
3	Chinese Taipei	3	1	0	2	4	17	−13	3	
4	Hong Kong	3	0	0	3	2	29	−27	0	

Source: FIH
Rules for classification: 1) points; 2) goal difference; 3) goals scored; 4) head-to-head result.
(H) Hosts

==== Fixtures ====
6 October 2013
13:00

China	8–0	Chinese Taipei
Liang M. 2'; Wu 8', 42'; Wang M. 29', 35', 66'; Zhang 51'; Wang N. 48'	Report

Umpires:
Melanie Oakden (NZL)
Ikumi Negishi (JPN)

6 October 2013
15:00

Japan	15–0	Hong Kong
Arai 1', 9', 35', 48'; Mitsuhashi 4', 44'; Ono 15'; Y. Nagai 27'; Nakagawa 45'; Otsuka 47'; Nishimura 50'; H. Nagai 53'; 57'; Ota 61'; Oikawa 67'	Report

Umpires:
Nur Hafizah Azman (MAZ)
Tian Yimiao (CHN)

8 October 2013
13:00

Hong Kong	2–4	Chinese Taipei
Chan C. 25'; 58'	Report	Chen H. 12'; Su 18', 56'; Hsu 70'

Umpires:
Kamolrat Thongkanarak (THA)
Ikumi Negishi (JPN)

8 October 2013
15:00

Japan	1–1	China
Mitsuhashi 20'	Report	Peng 63'

Umpires:
Tang Shi-Him (HKG)
Melanie Oakden (NZL)

10 October 2013
13:00

Chinese Taipei	0–7	Japan
	Report	Nishimura 4'; Arai 5'; 12'; Shibata 39', 41', 42'; Mitsuhashi 46'

Umpires:
Tang Shi-Him (HKG)
Tian Yimiao (CHN)

10 October 2013
15:00

China	10–0	Hong Kong
Hao 6', 7'; Peng 12'; Wang M. 21', 26'; Yao 24', 43'; Liang X. 44', 67'; Liang M. 53'	Report

Umpires:
Nur Hafizah Azman (MAS)
Kamolrat Thongkanarak (THA)

=== Classification matches ===
==== Bronze-medal match ====
12 October 2013
12:00

Chinese Taipei	4–2	Hong Kong
Su 25', 70'; Wu 56'; Yang 65'	Report	Lai 30'; Chan C. 59'

Umpires:
Ikumi Negishi (CHN)
Tian Yimiao (CHN)

==== Gold-medal match ====
12 October 2013
14:30

Japan	4–3	China
Shibata 27'; Arai 35'; Ota 43'; Otsuka 55'	Report	Wu 2', 52'; Hao 67'

Umpires:
Melanie Oakden (NZL)
Nur Hafizah Azman (MAS)

== Statistics ==
=== Final standings ===
Pos	Team	Pld	W	D	L	GF	GA	GD	Pts
1st place, gold medalist(s)	Japan	4	3	1	0	27	4	+23	10
2nd place, silver medalist(s)	China (H)	4	2	1	1	22	5	+17	7
3rd place, bronze medalist(s)	Chinese Taipei	4	2	0	2	8	19	−11	6
4	Hong Kong	4	0	0	4	4	33	−29	0

Source: FIH
(H) Hosts

=== Goalscorers ===
There were 61 goals scored in 8 matches, for an average of 7.62 goals per match.

6 goals

- (Japan) Mazuki Arai

5 goals

- (China) Wang Mengyu

4 goals

- (China) Wu Mengrong
- (Chinese Taipei) Su Pei-Ling
- (Japan) Aki Mitsuhashi
- (Japan) Akane Shibata

3 goals

- (China) Hao Weljia

2 goals

- (China) Yao Lili
- (China) Liang Meiyu
- (China) Liang Xue
- (China) Peng Yang
- (Hong Kong) Chan Ching-Nam
- (Japan) Ayaka Nishimura
- (Japan) Akiko Ota
- (Japan) Shiho Otsuka

1 goal

- (China) Wang Na
- (China) Zhang Xiaoxue
- (Chinese Taipei) Hsu Hsin-Yun
- (Chinese Taipei) Chen Hsiu-Chin
- (Chinese Taipei) Wu Min-Hsuan
- (Chinese Taipei) Yang Wan-Wen
- (Hong Kong) Lai Win-Yin
- (Japan) Hazuki Nagai
- (Japan) Yuri Nagai
- (Japan) Miyuki Nakagawa
- (Japan) Shihori Oikawa
- (Japan) Mayumi Ono

1 own goal

- Hong Kong (against Japan)

2 own goals

- Chinese Taipei (against Hong Kong and Japan)

Source: FIH
