= 2015 Hawke's Bay Cup =

Field hockey competition

Tournament details
- Host country: New Zealand
- City: Hastings
- Dates: 11–19 April
- Teams: 8
- Venue(s): Hawke's Bay Sports Park

Final positions
- Champions: Australia (1st title)
- Runner-up: New Zealand
- Third place: China

Tournament statistics
- Matches played: 24
- Goals scored: 82 (3.42 per match)
- Top scorer(s): (New Zealand) Olivia Merry (6 goals)

The 2015 Hawke's Bay Cup was the second edition of the invitational Hawke's Bay Cup field hockey competition. It took place between 11–19 April 2015 in Hastings, New Zealand. A total of eight teams competed for the title.

Australia won the tournament for the first time after defeating New Zealand 3–2 in the final. China won the third place match by defeating South Korea 3–1.

== Teams ==
Including New Zealand, 8 teams were invited by the New Zealand Hockey Federation to participate in the tournament.

- Argentina
- Australia
- China
- India
- Japan
- New Zealand
- South Korea
- United States

== Results ==
=== First round ===
==== Pool A ====
Pos	Team	Pld	W	D	L	GF	GA	GD	Pts
1	China	3	2	1	0	6	4	+2	7
2	United States	3	1	1	1	6	5	+1	4
3	Australia	3	0	3	0	3	3	0	3
4	India	3	0	1	2	3	6	−3	1

Rules for classification: 1) points; 2) goal difference; 3) goals scored; 4) head-to-head result.

11 April 2015
13:30

China	2–1	India
Wang 34'; Yu 38'	Report	Thokchom 31'

Hawke's Bay Sports Park
Umpires:
Jo Cumming (NZL)
Kim Jung-Hee (KOR)

11 April 2015
15:30

Australia	1–1	United States
Smith 42'	Report	González 22'

Hawke's Bay Sports Park
Umpires:
Caroline Brunekreef (NED)
Emi Yamada (JPN)

12 April 2015
13:30

United States	4–2	India
Witmer 19'; Sharkey 42', 43'; Reinprecht 47'	Report	Thokchom 6', 44'

Hawke's Bay Sports Park
Umpires:
Maria Locatelli (ARG)
Emi Yamada (JPN)

12 April 2015
15:30

China	2–2	Australia
Peng 26'; Xi 35'	Report	Blyth 4'; Kenny 30'

Hawke's Bay Sports Park
Umpires:
Kim Jung-Hee (KOR)
Hafizah Azman Nor (MAS)

14 April 2015
15:30

United States	1–2	China
O'Donnell 27'	Report	Xu 20'; Liang 59'

Hawke's Bay Sports Park
Umpires:
Maria Locatelli (ARG)
Jo Cumming (NZL)

14 April 2015
19:30

Australia	0–0	India
	Report

Hawke's Bay Sports Park
Umpires:
Kim Jung-Hee (KOR
Emi Yamada (JPN)

==== Pool B ====
Pos	Team	Pld	W	D	L	GF	GA	GD	Pts
1	New Zealand	3	2	1	0	7	5	+2	7
2	Argentina	3	2	0	1	6	4	+2	6
3	South Korea	3	1	0	2	3	5	−2	3
4	Japan	3	0	1	2	4	6	−2	1

Rules for classification: 1) points; 2) goal difference; 3) goals scored; 4) head-to-head result.

11 April 2015
17:30

Argentina	2–0	South Korea
Cavallero 35', 54'	Report

Hawke's Bay Sports Park
Umpires:
Hafizah Azman Nor (MAS)
Dahiya Deepa (IND)

11 April 2015
19:30

New Zealand	2–2	Japan
McCann 50'; Hayward 58'	Report	Oikawa 24'; Nagai 32'

Hawke's Bay Sports Park
Umpires:
Suzi Sutton (USA)
Jianjun Chen (CHN)

12 April 2015
17:30

New Zealand	3–2	Argentina
Pearce 14'; Punt 23'; Merry 30'	Report	A. Habif 7'; Merino 38'

Hawke's Bay Sports Park
Umpires:
Caroline Brunekreef (NED)
Aleisha Neumann (AUS)

12 April 2015
19:30

South Korea	2–1	Japan
Kim Jong-eun 33', 59'	Report	Oikawa 3'

Hawke's Bay Sports Park
Umpires:
Suzi Sutton (USA)
Dahiya Deepa (IND)

14 April 2015
13:30

Argentina	2–1	Japan
Rebecchi 34'; F. Habif 43'	Report	Nakashima 56'

Hawke's Bay Sports Park
Umpires:
Hafizah Azman Nor (MAS)
Dahiya Deepa (IND)

14 April 2015
17:30

South Korea	1–2	New Zealand
Cheon Eun-bi 55'	Report	Merry 17'; Flynn 49'

Hawke's Bay Sports Park
Umpires:
Aleisha Neumann (AUS)
Jianjun Chen (CHN)

=== Second round ===
Fifth place
Argentina	0
United States	3
Seventh place
Japan	2
India	3

Consolation semifinals
Japan	2
Argentina	3
India	0
United States	3

Quarterfinals
China (p.s.o)	0 (3)
Japan	0 (1)
Argentina	0
Australia	1
New Zealand	4
India	1
United States	1
South Korea	2

Semifinals
China	2
Australia	3
New Zealand	4
South Korea	0

Final
Australia	3
New Zealand	2
Third place
China	3
South Korea	2

==== Quarter-finals ====
16 April 2015
13:30

China	0–0	Japan
	Report
Penalties
De (penalty shoot-out scored); Liang (penalty shoot-out missed); Peng (penalty shoot-out scored); Li (penalty shoot-out scored)	3–1	(penalty shoot-out missed) Shibata; (penalty shoot-out missed) Kato; (penalty shoot-out scored) Yamamoto; (penalty shoot-out missed) Oikawa

Hawke's Bay Sports Park
Umpires:
Jo Cumming (NZL)
Hafizah Azman Nor (MAS)

16 April 2015
15:45

Argentina	0–1	Australia
	Report	Slattery 4'

Hawke's Bay Sports Park
Umpires:
Suzi Sutton (US)
Jianjun Chen (CHN)

16 April 2015
18:00

New Zealand	4–1	India
Webster 7'; Merry 28', 39'; Gunson 55'	Report	Rani 6'

Hawke's Bay Sports Park
Umpires:
Emi Yamada (JPN)
Caroline Brunekreef (NED)

16 April 2015
20:15

United States	1–2	South Korea
Kolojejchick 14'	Report	Kim Bo-mi 19'; Park Seung-a 42'

Hawke's Bay Sports Park
Umpires:
Aleisha Neumann (AUS)
Maria Locatelli (ARG)

==== Fifth to eighth place classification ====
===== Crossover =====
18 April 2015
12:00

Japan	2–3	Argentina
Oikawa 30+'; Kato 38'	Report	Rebecchi 9', 49'; Barrionuevo 34'

Hawke's Bay Sports Park
Umpires:
Dahiya Deepa (IND)
Caroline Brunekreef (NED)

18 April 2015
14:15

India	0–3	United States
	Report	Sharkey 10'; O'Donnell 14', 45'

Hawke's Bay Sports Park
Umpires:
Kim Jung-Hee (KOR)
Jo Cumming (NZL)

===== Seventh and eighth place =====
19 April 2015
12:00

Japan	2–3	India
Nakashima 9'; Yamamoto 20'	Report	Pukhrambam 27'; Deepika 54'; Rampal 57'

Hawke's Bay Sports Park
Umpires:
Jianjun Chen (CHN)
Maria Locatelli (ARG)

===== Fifth and sixth place =====
19 April 2015
14:15

Argentina	0–3	United States
	Report	Witmer 20'; O'Donnell 26'; Crandall 44'

Hawke's Bay Sports Park
Umpires:
Aleisha Neumann (AUS)
Kim Jung-Hee (KOR)

==== First to fourth place classification ====
===== Semi-finals =====
18 April 2015
16:30

New Zealand	4–0	South Korea
Merry 12'; Flynn 13'; Webster 39', 50'	Report

Hawke's Bay Sports Park
Umpires:
Aleisha Neumann (AUS)
Maria Locatelli (ARG)

18 April 2015
18:45

China	2–3	Australia
Wang 20'; Yu 55'	Report	Blyth 11'; Kenny 42'; Parker 51'

Hawke's Bay Sports Park
Umpires:
Emi Yamada (JPN)
Suzi Sutton (USA)

===== Third and fourth place =====
19 April 2015
16:30

China	3–2	South Korea
Zhang 10'; Wang 15'; Bao 37'	Report	Kim Da Rae 17', 51'

Hawke's Bay Sports Park
Umpires:
Jo Cumming (NZL)
Hafizah Azman Nor (MAS)

===== Final =====
19 April 2015
18:45

Australia	3–2	New Zealand
Smith 40'; Peris 43'; Kenny 60'	Report	Flynn 1'; Merry 44'

Hawke's Bay Sports Park
Umpires:
Caroline Brunekreef (NED)
Suzi Sutton (USA)

== Statistics ==
=== Final standings ===
As per statistical convention in field hockey, matches decided in extra time are counted as wins and losses, while matches decided by penalty shoot-outs are counted as draws.

Pos	Team	Pld	W	D	L	GF	GA	GD	Pts	Status
1st place, gold medalist(s)	Australia	6	3	3	0	10	7	+3	12	Gold Medal
2nd place, silver medalist(s)	New Zealand	6	4	1	1	17	9	+8	13	Silver Medal
3rd place, bronze medalist(s)	China	6	3	2	1	11	9	+2	11	Bronze Medal
4	South Korea	6	2	0	4	7	13	−6	6	
5	United States	6	3	1	2	13	7	+6	10	
6	Argentina	6	3	0	3	9	10	−1	9	
7	India	6	1	1	4	7	15	−8	4	
8	Japan	6	0	2	4	8	12	−4	2	

Source: FIH

=== Goalscorers ===
There were 82 goals scored in 24 matches, for an average of 3.42 goals per match.

6 goals

- (New Zealand) Olivia Merry

4 goals

- (United States) Kathleen O'Donnell

3 goals

- (Argentina) Carla Rebecchi
- (Australia) Jodie Kenny
- (China) Wang Mengyu
- (India) Anuradha Thokchom
- (Japan) Shihori Oikawa
- (New Zealand) Gemma Flynn
- (New Zealand) Petrea Webster
- (United States) Kathleen Sharkey

2 goals

- (Argentina) Martina Cavallero
- (Australia) Madonna Blyth
- (Australia) Emily Smith
- (China) Yu Qian
- (Japan) Mie Nakashima
- (South Korea) Da-Rae
- (South Korea) Kim Jong-Eun
- (United States) Jill Witmer

1 goal

- (Argentina) Noel Barrionuevo
- (Argentina) Agustina Habif
- (Argentina) Florencia Habif
- (Argentina) Delfina Merino
- (Australia) Georgina Parker
- (Australia) Brooke Peris
- (Australia) Kathryn Slattery
- (China) Liang Meiyu
- (China) Bao Qianqian
- (China) Xu Xiaoxu
- (China) Zhang Xiaoxue
- (China) Xi Xiayun
- (China) Peng Yang
- (India) Sushila Chanu
- (India) Ritu Rani
- (India) Rani Rampal
- (India) Deepika Thakur
- (Japan) Akiko Kato
- (Japan) Hazuki Nagai
- (Japan) Yukari Yamamoto
- (New Zealand) Elizabeth Gunson
- (New Zealand) Pippa Hayward
- (New Zealand) Rachel McCann
- (New Zealand) Kirsten Pearce
- (New Zealand) Anita Punt
- (South Korea) Kim Bo-Mi
- (South Korea) Cheon Eun-Bi
- (South Korea) Park Seung-A
- (United States) Lauren Crandall
- (United States) Kelsey Kolojejchick
- (United States) Melissa González
- (United States) Katherine Reinprecht
