= Women's field hockey Qualifying Tournaments for the 2012 Summer Olympics =

2012 Women's Hockey Summer Olympics Qualifying Tournament
Tournament details
- Dates: 18 February–5 May 2012
- Teams: 18 (from 5 confederations)
- Venue: 3 (in 3 host cities)

Tournament statistics
- Matches played: 54
- Goals scored: 230 (4.26 per match)
- Top scorer(s): (Ireland) Audrey O'Flynn (Italy) Alessia Padalino (8 goals)

The Women's field hockey Qualifying Tournament for the 2012 Summer Olympics were qualification tournaments that determined the final three spots for the 2012 Summer Olympics.

The three events were held in Belgium, India and Japan from February to May 2012.

Belgium, Japan and South Africa won the three tournaments, taking the final quotas for the Olympic Games.

== Teams ==
Below is the list of 18 teams who participate in these qualifying tournaments:

Zone	Tournament	Qualifier(s)
Asia	2010 Asian Games	India; Japan; Malaysia
Africa	2011 African Olympic Qualifier	South Africa
Americas	2011 Pan American Games	Canada; Chile; Mexico; ~~Trinidad and Tobago~~^{1}
Europe	2011 EuroHockey Nations Championship	Azerbaijan; Belgium; Ireland; Italy; Spain
Europe	EuroHockey Nations Trophy	Belarus; France; Poland; Russia; Ukraine

^1 – Replaced by Austria

== Qualifying 1 ==
Qualifier 1
Tournament details
- Host country: India
- City: New Delhi
- Dates: 18–25 February
- Teams: 6
- Venue: Dhyan Chand National Stadium

Final positions
- Champions: South Africa
- Runner-up: India
- Third place: Italy

Tournament statistics
- Matches played: 18
- Goals scored: 61 (3.39 per match)
- Top scorer: (Italy) Alessia Padalino (8 goals)
- Best player: (South Africa) Marsha Marescia

=== Results ===
All times are DST (UTC+5:30).

==== Preliminary round ====
Pos	Team	Pld	W	D	L	GF	GA	GD	Pts	Qualification
1	South Africa	5	4	1	0	14	5	+9	13	Final
2	India	5	3	1	1	11	7	+4	10	Final
3	Italy	5	2	2	1	9	6	+3	8	
4	Ukraine	5	2	1	2	8	7	+1	7	
5	Canada	5	1	1	3	7	15	−8	4	
6	Poland	5	0	0	5	2	11	−9	0	

Source: FIH
Rules for classification: 1) points; 2) goal difference; 3) goals scored; 4) head-to-head result.

===== Matches =====
18 February 2012
10:00

South Africa	2–1	Poland
Woods 39'; Coetzee 53'	Report	Zagajska 39'

Umpires:
Mariana Reydo (ARG)
Claire Adenot (FRA)

18 February 2012
12:00

Italy	2–2	Canada
Wybieralska 3'; Padalino 63'	Report	Culley 40'; Stairs 61'

Umpires:
Soledad Iparraguirre (ARG)
Karen Bennett (NZL)

18 February 2012
18:00

India	1–1	Ukraine
Yendala 42'	Report	Vynohradova 26'

Umpires:
Chieko Soma (JPN)
Dino Willox (WAL)

19 February 2012
10:00

Poland	1–4	Italy
Grzanka 49'	Report	Ruggieri 41'; Padalino 43', 48', 65'

Umpires:
Lynn Cowie-McAllister (AUS)
Maggie Giddens (USA)

19 February 2012
14:00

South Africa	2–0	Ukraine
Coetzee 20'; Chamberlain 29'	Report

Umpires:
Chieko Soma (JPN)
Vilma Bagdanskiene (LTU)

19 February 2012
18:00

India	4–1	Canada
Yendala 16'; Rani 19'; Chanu 29'; Thokchom 49'	Report	Haughn 69'

Umpires:
Soledad Iparraguirre (ARG)
Karen Bennett (NZL)

21 February 2012
10:00

Canada	2–5	Ukraine
Gillis 2'; Secco 48'	Report	Khilko 12', 28', 43'; Salenko 38'; Sadova 40'

Umpires:
Dino Willox (WAL)
Claire Adenot (FRA)

21 February 2012
12:00

Italy	1–1	South Africa
Padalino 4'	Report	Penny 40'

Umpires:
Chieko Soma (JPN)
Maggie Giddens (USA)

21 February 2012
18:00

Poland	0–3	India
	Report	Ritu 14'; Rani 36'; Poonam 62'

Umpires:
Vilma Bagdanskiene (LTU)
Mariana Reydo (ARG)

22 February 2012
10:00

Ukraine	1–2	Italy
Sadova 39'	Report	Padalino 5'; Ruggieri 69'

Umpires:
Lynn Cowie Mcallister (AUS)
Karen Bennett (NZL)

22 February 2012
14:00

Canada	1–0	Poland
Jameson 65'	Report

Umpires:
Vilma Bagdanskiene (LTU)
Maggie Giddens (USA)

22 February 2012
18:00

India	2–5	South Africa
Lakra 23'; Yendala 52'	Report	Chamberlain 12', 32', 58'; Damons 53', 67'

Umpires:
Soledad Iparraguirre (ARG)
Mariana Reydo (ARG)

24 February 2012
10:00

Ukraine	1–0	Poland
Ivakhnenko 28'	Report

Umpires:
Lynn Cowie Mcallister (AUS)
Maggie Giddens (USA)

24 February 2012
14:00

South Africa	4–1	Canada
Damons 16'; Chamberlain 41', 60', 62'	Report	Culley 16'

Umpires:
Karen Bennett (NZL)
Vilma Bagdanskiene (LTU)

24 February 2012
18:00

Italy	0–1	India
	Report	Ritu 55'

Umpires:
Claire Adenot (FRA)
Dino Willox (WAL)

==== Classification round ====
===== Fifth and sixth place =====
25 February 2012
15:00

Canada	3–0	Poland
Culley 18'; Stairs 40'; Jameson 45'	Report

Umpires:
Lynn Cowie McAllister (AUS)
Dino Willox (WAL)

===== Third and fourth place =====
25 February 2012
17:30

Italy	2–1	Ukraine
Padalino 34', 67'	Report	Sadovaia 42'

Umpires:
Claire Adenot (FRA)
Mariana Reydo (ARG)

===== Final =====
25 February 2012
20:00

South Africa	3–1	India
Russell 4'; Coetzee 30'; Marescia 53'	Report	Ja. Kaur 57'

Umpires:
Chieko Soma (JPN)
Soledad Iparraguirre (ARG)

=== Statistics ===
==== Awards ====
Player of the Tournament	Top Goalscorer	Goalkeeper of the Tournament	Fair Play Award
(South Africa) Marsha Marescia	(Italy) Alessia Padalino	(Italy) Roberta Lilliu	India

==== Final standings ====
1. South Africa
2. India
3. Italy
4. Ukraine
5. Canada
6. Poland

== Qualifying 2 ==
Qualifier 2
Tournament details
- Host country: Belgium
- City: Kontich
- Dates: 17–25 March
- Teams: 6
- Venue: Beerschot Tennis Club

Final positions
- Champions: Belgium
- Runner-up: Ireland
- Third place: Spain

Tournament statistics
- Matches played: 18
- Goals scored: 91 (5.06 per match)
- Top scorer: (Ireland) Audrey O'Flynn (8 goals)
- Best player: (Belgium) Sofie Gierts

=== Results ===
All times are CET (UTC+01:00).

==== Preliminary round ====
Pos	Team	Pld	W	D	L	GF	GA	GD	Pts	Qualification
1	Belgium	5	4	1	0	22	1	+21	13	Final
2	Ireland	5	4	1	0	17	4	+13	13	Final
3	Spain	5	2	1	2	12	6	+6	7	
4	Russia	5	2	1	2	9	11	−2	7	
5	France	5	1	0	4	9	18	−9	3	
6	Mexico	5	0	0	5	5	34	−29	0	

Source: FIH
Rules for classification: 1) points; 2) goal difference; 3) goals scored; 4) head-to-head result.

===== Matches =====
17 March 2012
11:00

Spain	7–0	Mexico
Ybarra 21', 37'; Petchamé 26', 28'; Bonastre 65'; Malda 66', 70'	Report

Umpires:
Stella Bartlema (NED)
Annelize Rostron (RSA)

17 March 2012
13:30

Ireland	5–1	France
Speers 20'; O'Flynn 35'; Connery 38'; Jacob 45'; Harvey 47'	Report	Dutel 13'

Umpires:
Amy Hassick (USA)
Valentina Tomasi (ITA)

17 March 2012
16:00

Belgium	4–0	Russia
Gierts 34'; Sinia 44'; De Groof 54'; Boon 70'	Report

Umpires:
Michelle Joubert (RSA)
Chen Hong (CHN)

18 March 2012
11:00

Spain	2–1	France
Pérez 22'; Malda 32'	Report	Dutel 25'

Umpires:
Keely Dunn (CAN)
Emi Yamada (JPN)

18 March 2012
13:30

Ireland	3–0	Russia
Harvey 21'; O'Flynn 34', 39'	Report

Umpires:
Melissa Trivic (AUS)
Stella Bartlema (NED)

18 March 2012
16:00

Mexico	0–12	Belgium
	Report	Boon 8', 42', 67'; Coppey 19'; De Vos 23'; Raes 39'; Gierts 43'; Sinia 44'; Valcke 53'; De Groof 59', 61'; Danhaive 70'

Umpires:
Chen Hong (CHN)
Valentina Tomasi (ITA)

20 March 2012
13:00

Mexico	0–5	Ireland
	Report	O'Flynn 44', 64'; Smyth 60', 66'; Sargent 69'

Umpires:
Keely Dunn (CAN)
Annelize Rostron (RSA)

20 March 2012
15:30

Russia	3–2	France
Mozgovaya 27', 55'; Shamina 53'	Report	Preney 21'; Dutel 48'

Umpires:
Emi Yamada (JPN)
Michelle Joubert (RSA)

20 March 2012
18:00

Belgium	1–0	Spain
Boon 2'	Report

Umpires:
Amy Hassick (USA)
Melissa Trivic (AUS)

22 March 2012
14:00

Russia	5–1	Mexico
Grigorieva 14', 47', 59'; Osipova 33'; Shamina 60'	Report	Navarro 51'

Umpires:
Amy Hassick (USA)
Chen Hong (CHN)

22 March 2012
16:30

Ireland	3–2	Spain
O'Flynn 6', 28'; Speers 60'	Report	Malda 7'; Petchamé 66'

Umpires:
Michelle Joubert (RSA)
Annelize Rostron (RSA)

22 March 2012
19:00

France	0–4	Belgium
	Report	De Groof 19', 54', 59'; Delmée 25'

Umpires:
Valentina Tomasi (ITA)
Emi Yamada (JPN)

23 March 2012
14:00

France	5–4	Mexico
Roger 9'; Berly 10'; Dutel 30'; Preney 55', 68'	Report	Castillo 3', 19'; Navarro 42'; Correa 46'

Umpires:
Valentina Tomasi (ITA)
Melissa Trivic (AUS)

23 March 2012
16:30

Spain	1–1	Russia
Ybarra 11'	Report	Shumilina 33'

Umpires:
Chen Hong (CHN)
Keely Dunn (CAN)

23 March 2012
19:00

Belgium	1–1	Ireland
Boon 9'	Report	Watkins 23'

Umpires:
Stella Bartlema (NED)
Emi Yamada (JPN)

==== Classification round ====
===== Fifth and sixth place =====
25 March 2012
11:30

France	5–1	Mexico
Rogeau 5'; Roger 58'; Dutel 62', 65'; Preney 68'	Report	Navarro 18'

Umpires:
Keely Dunn (CAN)
Annelize Rostron (RSA)

===== Third and fourth place =====
25 March 2012
14:00

Spain	5–1	Russia
Comerma 29'; Menéndez 31'; Petchamé 51'; Pérez 56', 32'	Report	Shamina 58'

Umpires:
Stella Bartlema (NED)
Melissa Trivic (AUS)

===== Final =====
25 March 2012
16:30

Belgium	4–1	Ireland
Gierts 12', 17', 19'; Coppey 57'	Report	O'Flynn 56'

Umpires:
Michelle Joubert (RSA)
Amy Hassick (USA)

=== Statistics ===
==== Awards ====
Player of the Tournament	Top Goalscorer	Goalkeeper of the Tournament
(Belgium) Sofie Gierts	(Ireland) Audrey O'Flynn	(Mexico) Ahidee Castíllo

==== Final standings ====
1. Belgium
2. Ireland
3. Spain
4. Russia
5. France
6. Mexico

== Qualifying 3 ==
Qualifier 3
Tournament details
- Host country: Japan
- City: Kakamigahara
- Dates: 25 April–May 5
- Teams: 6
- Venue: Gifu-ken Green Stadium

Final positions
- Champions: Japan
- Runner-up: Azerbaijan
- Third place: Chile

Tournament statistics
- Matches played: 18
- Goals scored: 78 (4.33 per match)
- Top scorer: (Japan) Kaori Fujio (6 goals)
- Best player: (Japan) Sachimi Iwao

=== Results ===
All times are JST (UTC+09:00).

==== Preliminary round ====
Pos	Team	Pld	W	D	L	GF	GA	GD	Pts	Qualification
1	Japan	5	4	1	0	23	1	+22	13	Final
2	Azerbaijan	5	3	1	1	15	6	+9	10	Final
3	Chile	5	2	2	1	8	6	+2	8	
4	Belarus	5	2	1	2	10	10	0	7	
5	Austria	5	1	0	4	3	22	−19	3	
6	Malaysia	5	0	1	4	5	19	−14	1	

Source: FIH
Rules for classification: 1) points; 2) goal difference; 3) goals scored; 4) head-to-head result.

===== Matches =====
25 April 2012
13:30

Chile	1–3	Belarus
Villagra 40'	Report	Mikheichyk 8', 53'; Silitskaya 50'

Umpires:
Irene Clelland (GBR)
Caroline Brenekreff (NED)

25 April 2012
16:00

Japan	7–0	Austria
Yamamoto 6'; Shibata 12'; Komazawa 25'; Murukami 30'; Mitsuhashi 50'; Nakagawa 64'; Otsuka 68'	Report

Umpires:
Irene Presenqui (ARG)
Amber Church (NZL)

25 April 2012
18:30

Azerbaijan	4–0	Malaysia
Aliyeva 17', 31'; M. Mammadova 45'; Muradi 56'	Report

Umpires:
Lisa Roach (AUS)
Hannah Sanders (GBR)

27 April 2012
13:30

Azerbaijan	3–0	Belarus
Aliyeva 52', 58'; Suleymanova 69'	Report

Umpires:
Kelly Hudson (NZL)
Irene Presenqui (ARG)

27 April 2012
16:00

Japan	8–0	Malaysia
Fujio 10', 41', 61'; Iwao 33'; Murukami 38'; Nakagawa 43'; Komazawa 52'; Otsuka 55'	Report

Umpires:
Kylie Seymour (AUS)
Irene Clelland (GBR)

27 April 2012
18:30

Austria	0–3	Chile
	Report	D. Caram 6'; De. Infante 37', 63'

Umpires:
Stephanie Judefind (USA)
Lisa Roach (AUS)

29 April 2012
13:30

Chile	0–0	Japan
	Report

Umpires:
Kelly Hudon (NZL)
Hannah Sanders (GBR)

29 April 2012
16:00

Austria	0–5	Azerbaijan
	Report	Muradi 9'; F. Mammadova 18'; M. Mammadova 32'; Matjusaityte 49'; Han 66'

Umpires:
Kylie Seymour (AUS)
Caroline Brunekreef (NED)

29 April 2012
18:30

Belarus	2–2	Malaysia
Silitskaya 17'; Halinouskaya 27'	Report	Othman 41'; Ruhani 68'

Umpires:
Stephanie Judefind (USA)
Amber Church (NZL)

1 May 2012
13:30

Malaysia	1–2	Chile
Slyvester Silin 49'	Report	Urroz 66'; D. Caram 69'

Umpires:
Lisa Roach (AUS)
Irene Presenqui (ARG)

1 May 2012
16:00

Azerbaijan	1–4	Japan
Han 6'	Report	Murukami 12'; Nakagawa 23', 58'; Iwao 32'

Umpires:
Amber Church (NZL)
Kylie Seymour (AUS)

1 May 2012
18:30

Belarus	5–0	Austria
Kurhanskaya 8'; Stsiafutkina 23'; Mikheichyk 29'; Silitskaya 69'; Piotukh 70'	Report

Umpires:
Hannah Sanders (GBR)
Irene Clelland (GBR)

3 May 2012
13:30

Austria	3–2	Malaysia
Sandner 7', 67'; Laginja 53'	Report	Hashim 20'; Othman 27'

Umpires:
Kylie Seymour (AUS)
Hannah Sanders (GBR)

3 May 2012
16:00

Japan	4–0	Belarus
Fujio 3', 65'; Komazawa 23'; Yamamoto 55'	Report

Umpires:
Kelly Hudson (NZL)
Stephanie Judefind (USA)

3 May 2012
18:30

Chile	2–2	Azerbaijan
De. Infante 60'; C. Caram 62'	Report	M. Mammadova 30', 40'

Umpires:
Caroline Brunekreef (NED)
Irene Clelland (GBR)

==== Classification round ====
===== Fifth and sixth place =====
5 May 2012
10:00

Austria	0–5	Malaysia
	Report	Othman 12'; Arumugam 31'; Sumantri 40'; Mohamad Din 43'; Hashim 47'

Umpires:
Stephanie Judefind (USA)
Caroline Brunekreef (NED)

===== Third and fourth place =====
5 May 2012
12:30

Chile	2–1	Belarus
D. Caram 4'; C. Caram 9'	Report	Mikheichyk 53'

Umpires:
Irene Presenqui (ARG)
Amber Church (NZL)

===== Final =====
5 May 2012
15:00

Japan	5–1	Azerbaijan
Komazawa 8', 48'; Shibata 21', 25'; Fujio 28'	Report	Aliyeva 41'

Umpires:
Lisa Roach (AUS)
Kelly Hudson (NZL)

=== Statistics ===
==== Awards ====
Player of the Tournament	Top Goalscorer	Goalkeeper of the Tournament	Fair Play Award
(Japan) Sachimi Iwao	(Japan) Kaori Fujio	(Azerbaijan) Viktoriya Shahbazova	Japan

==== Final standings ====
1. Japan
2. Azerbaijan
3. Chile
4. Belarus
5. Malaysia
6. Austria
