= Field hockey at the 2014 Asian Games – Women's tournament =

Women's field hockey tournament at the 2014 Asian Games
Tournament details
- Host country: South Korea
- City: Incheon
- Dates: 22 September – 1 October
- Teams: 8
- Venue: Seonhak Hockey Stadium

Medalists
gold medal	South Korea
silver medal	China
bronze medal	India

Tournament statistics
- Matches played: 18
- Goals scored: 92 (5.11 per match)
- Top scorer(s): (Japan) Mazuki Arai (South Korea) Kim Da-rae (5 goals)

Field hockey at the 2014 Asian Games for women was held in Incheon, South Korea from 22 September to 1 October 2014.

South Korea won the tournament for the fifth time after defeating China 1–0 in the final.

== Officials ==
The following umpires were appointed by the FIH and AHF to officiate the tournament:

- Laurine Delforge (BEL)
- Megan Robertson (CAN)
- Miao Lin (CHN)
- Chen Mei-chen (TPE)
- Claire Adenot (FRA)
- Nirmla Dagar (IND)
- Emi Yamada (JPN)
- Amina Dyussembekova (KAZ)
- Nur Hafizah Azman (MAS)
- Kang Hyun-young (KOR)
- Ornpimol Kittiteerasopon (THA)

== Squads ==
China	Hong Kong	India	Japan
Li Dongxiao; Wang Mengyu; Huang Ting; Xu Xiaoxu; De Jiaojiao; Cui Qiuxia; Wu Mengrong; Xi Xiayun; Peng Yang; Liang Meiyu; Wang Na; Li Hongxia; Zhang Xiaoxue; Sun Xiao; Zhao Yudiao; Song Qingling	Yip Ting Wai; Grace Wong; Tiffany Chan; Janet Ho; Cheung Ka Po; Wong Ching Lung; Kirsten McNeil; Aliya Iqbal Khan; Weeraya Ho; Chan Ching Nam; Ho Yuen Shan; Chan Ka Yee; Mok Ka Man; Lau Pui Sze; Kwok Wing Yan; Yii Sui Suet	Navjot Kaur; Deep Grace Ekka; Monika Malik; Thokchom Chanchan Devi; Savita Punia; Ritu Rani; Poonam Rani; Vandana Kataria; Deepika Thakur; Namita Toppo; Jaspreet Kaur; Sunita Lakra; Sushila Chanu; Rani Rampal; Amandeep Kaur; Lilima Minz	Yuka Yoshikawa; Shiho Sakai; Keiko Manabe; Kana Nomura; Miyuki Nakagawa; Akiko Ota; Shiho Otsuka; Mayumi Ono; Shihori Oikawa; Mazuki Arai; Akane Shibata; Aki Mitsuhashi; Ayaka Nishimura; Yuri Nagai; Hazuki Nagai; Yoshino Kasahara
Kazakhstan	Malaysia	South Korea	Thailand
Guzal Bakhavaddin; Assel Mukasheva; Aizhan Bulebayeva; Natalya Sazontova; Aigerim Makhanova; Gulim Idrissova; Talshyn Bauyrzhanova; Vera Domashneva; Gulnara Imangaliyeva; Guzal Urmanova; Alissa Chepkassova; Irina Dobrioglo; Natalya Gataulina; Olga Sheveleva; Symbat Sabazova; Viktoriya Shaimardanova	Farah Ayuni Yahya; Norhasikin Halim; Nurul Nabihah Mansur; Noor Hasliza; Raja Norsharina; Siti Noor Amarina Ruhaini; Juliani Mohd Din; Norbaini Hashim; Siti Shahida Saad; Norazlin Sumantri; Nadia Abdul Rahman; Nurul Safiqah Mat Isa; Fazilla Sylvester Silin; Siti Noor Hafiza Zainordin; Rabiatul Adawiyah; Nuraini Abdul Rashid	Heo Jae-seong; Kim Hyun-ji; Shin Hye-jeong; An Hyo-ju; Han Hye-lyoung; Park Mi-hyun; Kim Jong-eun; Kim Da-rae; Cho Eun-ji; Seo Jung-eun; Kim Ok-ju; Oh Sun-soon; Park Ki-ju; Jang Soo-ji; Lee Young-sil; Cheon Eun-bi	Jesdaporn Tongsun; Praphatson Khuiklang; Salocha Losakul; Sirikwan Wongkaew; Kanyanut Nakpolkrung; Tikhamporn Sakunpithak; Kanya Jantapet; Chantree Yungyuen; Sukanya Ritngam; Boonta Duangurai; Supansa Samanso; Pawinee Boonkrajang; Anongnat Piresram; Kornkanok Sanpoung; Siraya Yimkrajang; Jongjit Boonmee

== Results ==
All times are Korea Standard Time (UTC+09:00)

=== Preliminary round ===
==== Pool A ====
Pos	Team	Pld	W	D	L	GF	GA	GD	Pts	Qualification
1	China	3	3	0	0	8	1	+7	9	Advance to semi-finals
2	India	3	2	0	1	10	3	+7	6	Advance to semi-finals
3	Malaysia	3	1	0	2	3	8	−5	3	
4	Thailand	3	0	0	3	1	10	−9	0	

Source: FIH
Rules for classification: 1) points; 2) goal difference; 3) goals scored; 4) head-to-head result.

22 September 2014
13:00

China	1–0	Malaysia
Wu 41'	Report

Umpires:
Claire Adenot (FRA)
Nirmla Dagar (IND)

22 September 2014
17:00

India	3–0	Thailand
Poonam 15', 40'; Deepika 53'	Report

Umpires:
Miao Lin (CHN)
Chen Mei-chen (TPE)

24 September 2014
15:00

Malaysia	2–1	Thailand
Fazilla 24'; Siti 27'	Report	Sakunpithak 53'

Umpires:
Emi Yamada (JPN)
Megan Robertson (CAN)

24 September 2014
17:00

India	1–2	China
Jaspreet 23'	Report	Liang 19'; Zhao 59'

Umpires:
Kang Hyun-young (KOR)
Nur Hafizah Azman (MAS)

26 September 2014
15:00

China	5–0	Thailand
Wang M. 3', 5'; Peng 13'; Zhao 28'; Xi 33'	Report

Umpires:
Amina Dyussembekova (KAZ)
Megan Robertson (CAN)

26 September 2014
17:00

Malaysia	1–6	India
Nadia 41'	Report	Rani 4', 20'; Jaspreet 9', 39'; Namita 17'; Vandana 50'

Umpires:
Laurine Delforge (BEL)
Ornpimol Kittiteerasopon (THA)

==== Pool B ====
Pos	Team	Pld	W	D	L	GF	GA	GD	Pts	Qualification
1	South Korea	3	3	0	0	21	0	+21	9	Advance to Semi-finals
2	Japan	3	2	0	1	22	2	+20	6	Advance to Semi-finals
3	Kazakhstan	3	1	0	2	5	19	−14	3	
4	Hong Kong	3	0	0	3	0	27	−27	0	

Source: FIH
Rules for classification: 1) points; 2) goal difference; 3) goals scored; 4) head-to-head result.

22 September 2014
15:00

Japan	14–0	Hong Kong
Oikawa 2'; Arai 8', 20'; Nishimura 10', 57'; Otsuka 12'; Shibata 29', 46'; Nomura 30', 38'; Sakai 44'; Mitsuhashi 54'; Ono 57', 59'	Report

Umpires:
Amina Dyussembekova (KAZ)
Nur Hafizah Azman (MAS)

22 September 2014
19:00

South Korea	11–0	Kazakhstan
Kim D. 2', 50'; Oh 12', 22', 24'; Kim O. 28', 60'; Kim J. 29', 43'; Han 32'; Park M. 46'	Report

Umpires:
Laurine Delforge (BEL)
Ornpimol Kittiteerasopon (THA)

24 September 2014
13:00

Kazakhstan	5–0	Hong Kong
Sazontova 10'; Imangaliyeva 22'; Bulebayeva 26'; Gataulina 50'; Mukasheva 52'	Report

Umpires:
Nirmla Dagar (IND)
Chen Mei-chen (TPE)

24 September 2014
19:00

Japan	0–2	South Korea
	Report	Kim D. 13'; Oh 24'

Umpires:
Miao Lin (CHN)
Claire Adenot (FRA)

26 September 2014
13:00

Kazakhstan	0–8	Japan
	Report	Arai 6', 11', 52'; Shibata 13', 15'; Ono 17', 50'; Kasahara 25'

Umpires:
Kang Hyun-young (KOR)
Chen Mei-chen (TPE)

26 September 2014
19:00

South Korea	8–0	Hong Kong
Lee 8', 35'; Heo 10'; Kim H. 11', 45'; Cheon 13', 49'; Kim J. 29'	Report

Umpires:
Emi Yamada (JPN)
Nirmla Dagar (IND)

=== Classification round ===
==== Fifth to eighth place classification ====
===== Seventh and eighth place =====
29 September 2014
14:00

Thailand	5–0	Hong Kong
Wongkaew 2'; Sakunpithak 6', 56', 58'; Losakul 32'	Report

Umpires:
Emi Yamada (JPN)
Amina Dyussembekova (KAZ)

===== Fifth and sixth place =====
1 October 2014
14:00

Malaysia	8–0	Kazakhstan
Rabiatul 20'; Norbaini 38'; Norazlin 38'; Nuraini 45', 53', 55'; Norhasikin 51'; Fazilla 56'	Report

Umpires:
Ornpimol Kittiteerasopon (THA)
Megan Robertson (CAN)

==== First to fourth place classification ====
Semi-finals
29 September
China	1
Japan	0
29 September
South Korea	3
India	1

Gold Medal
1 October
China	0
South Korea	1
Bronze Medal
1 October
Japan	1
India	2

===== Semi-finals =====
29 September 2014
16:30

China	1–0	Japan
Wang M. 57'	Report

Umpires:
Laurine Delforge (BEL)
Kang Hyun-young (KOR)

29 September 2014
19:00

South Korea	3–1	India
Kim D. 3'; Han 28'; Park M. 42'	Report	Namita 11'

Umpires:
Miao Lin (CHN)
Nur Hafizah Azman (MAS)

==== Bronze-medal match ====
1 October 2014
16:30

Japan	1–2	India
Shibata 41'	Report	Jaspreet 23'; Vandana 42'

Umpires:
Kang Hyun-young (KOR)
Miao Lin (CHN)

==== Gold-medal match ====
1 October 2014
19:00

China	0–1	South Korea
	Report	Kim D. 41'

Umpires:
Claire Adenot (FRA)
Laurine Delforge (BEL)

== Statistics ==
=== Final standings ===
As per statistical convention in field hockey, matches decided in extra time are counted as wins and losses, while matches decided by penalty shoot-outs are counted as draws.

Pos	Team	Pld	W	D	L	GF	GA	GD	Pts	Status
1st place, gold medalist(s)	South Korea	5	5	0	0	25	1	+24	15	Qualified for 2016 Summer Olympics
2nd place, silver medalist(s)	China	5	4	0	1	9	2	+7	12	
3rd place, bronze medalist(s)	India	5	3	0	2	13	7	+6	9	
4	Japan	5	2	0	3	23	5	+18	6	
5	Malaysia	4	2	0	2	11	8	+3	6	
6	Kazakhstan	4	1	0	3	5	27	−22	3	
7	Thailand	4	1	0	3	6	10	−4	3	
8	Hong Kong	4	0	0	4	0	32	−32	0	

Source: FIH

=== Goalscorers ===
There were 92 goals scored in 18 matches, for an average of 5.11 goals per match.

5 goals

- (Japan) Mazuki Arai
- (Japan) Akane Shibata
- (South Korea) Kim Da-Rae

4 goals

- (India) Jaspreet Kaur
- (Japan) Mayumi Ono
- (South Korea) Oh Sun-Soon
- (Thailand) Tikhamporn Sakunpithak

3 goals

- (China) Wang Mengyu
- (Malaysia) Nuraini Rashid
- (South Korea) Kim Jong-Eun

2 goals

- (China) Zhao Yudiao
- (India) Vandana Kataria
- (India) Rani Rampal
- (India) Poonam Rani
- (India) Namita Toppo
- (Japan) Ayaka Nishimura
- (Japan) Kana Nomura
- (Malaysia) Fazilla Sylvester
- (South Korea) Cheon Eun-Bi
- (South Korea) Han Hye-Lyoung
- (South Korea) Kim Hyun-Ji
- (South Korea) Kim Ok-Ju
- (South Korea) Park Mi-Hyun
- (South Korea) Lee Young-Sil

1 goal

- (China) Liang Meiyu
- (China) Wu Mengrong
- (China) Xi Xiayun
- (China) Peng Yang
- (India) Deepika Thakur
- (Japan) Yoshino Kasahara
- (Japan) Aki Mitsuhashi
- (Japan) Shihori Oikawa
- (Japan) Shiho Otsuka
- (Japan) Shiho Sakai
- (Kazakhstan) Natalya Sazontova
- (Kazakhstan) Gulnara Imangaliyeva
- (Kazakhstan) Aizhan Bulebayeva
- (Kazakhstan) Natalya Gataulina
- (Kazakhstan) Assel Mukasheva
- (Malaysia) Norhasikin Halim
- (Malaysia) Norbaini Hashim
- (Malaysia) Rabiatul Mohamed
- (Malaysia) Nadia Rahman
- (Malaysia) Siti Ruhani
- (Malaysia) Norazlin Sumantri
- (South Korea) Heo Jae-Seong
- (Thailand) Salocha Losakul
- (Thailand) Sirikwan Wongkaew

Source: FIH
