= Nikki Pradhan =

Indian field hockey player

Personal information
- Born: 8 December 1993 (age 32) Hesel, Ranchi, Bihar (present-day Khunti, Jharkhand), India
- Height: 1.53 m (5 ft 0 in)
- Weight: 49 kg (108 lb)

Sport
- Sport: Field hockey
- Position: Midfielder
Senior career
Years	Team	Caps	Goals
–	Hockey Jharkhand	-	-
–	Railways	-	-
2025–	Soorma Hockey Club	-	-
National team
Years	Team	Caps	Goals
2011–	India U18		-
2012–	India U21		-
2015–	India	219	(3)
Medal record
Women's field hockey
Representing India
Asian Games
Gold medal – first place	2026 Aichi–Nagoya	Team
Silver medal – second place	2018 Jakarta	Team
Bronze medal – third place	2022 Hangzhou	Team
Commonwealth Games
Bronze medal – third place	2022 Birmingham	Team
Asia Cup
Gold medal – first place	2017 Gifu
Silver medal – second place	2025 Hangzhou
Asian Champions Trophy
Gold medal – first place	2016 Singapore
Gold medal – first place	2023 Ranchi
Silver medal – second place	2018 Donghae
FIH Nations Cup
Gold medal – first place	2022 Spain
Junior Asia Cup
Silver medal – second place	2012 Bangkok
Girls' Asia Cup
Bronze medal – third place	2011 Bangkok

Nikki Pradhan (born 8 December 1993) is an Indian field hockey player and a member of the Indian national team. Pradhan was the first female Hockey player from Jharkhand who represented India in the Olympics. Pradhan was included in a 16-member squad for Rio Olympics, which also marked the return of Indian women's hockey to the Olympics after 36 years after a stellar show at the Hockey World League Semifinals in 2015. Pradhan was the midfielder of the Indian Women's Hockey team. Her selection to the team made her the sixth hockey player from Jharkhand to play in Olympics, bracketing her with Jaipal Singh Munda (1928), Michael Kido (1972), Sylvanus Dungdung (1980), Ajeet Lakra (1992) and Manohar Topno (1984).

== Early life ==
Pradhan was born in Hesel village in tribal heartland Khunti, roughly 60 kilometres from Ranchi, Jharkhand, on 8 December 1993, to Soma Pradhan, a Bihar police constable, and his wife, Jitan Devi, a homemaker. Pradhan is the third daughter of Soma Pradhan and Jitan Devi. She belongs to Kharwar Bhogta community.

Pradhan studied at Pilaul Middle School and started playing the game at a young age under the guidance of her childhood coach Dasrath Mahto. She was inspired by Pushpa Pradhan, who visited school in 1999 and tell her journey to national hockey team. Then she made hockey stick of bamboo and started to play. Later she enrolled in the Bariatu Girls' Hockey Center in Ranchi in 2005, which has produced former Indian captain Asunta Lakra. She leave sport hostel in 2009. After passing 12th class in 2010, she had to leave hostel but she was allowed to stay in hostel and play in campus due to request. After playing Jharkhand National Games in 2011, she got selected for national camp in 2012.

== Career ==
Pradhan played the first time for India in U-18 Asia Cup in Bangkok in 2011. However, Pradhan wasn't able to get selected for the India's Junior National Hockey Camp in 2011–2012. Pradhan was also a part of the U-21 team which won the silver medal in the 2012 junior Asia Cup, however, had to stay out of action due to an injury until the beginning of 2015. Pradhan made her debut for the Senior Indian Team and was called into the senior camp in August 2015.

Pradhan was later selected as a member of the squad of senior Indian team, which represented India in Rio Olympics in Brazil in 2016. Her selection to the Indian Women's Hockey team that represented India in Olympics scripted history as she was the first woman Hockey player from Jharkhand to ever play in Olympics. The 16-member team was led by defender Sushila Chanu. Pradhan played at the position of a midfielder, alongside Renuka Yadav, Llima Minz, Monika and Navjot Kaur. The other team members were Deep Grace Ekka, Anuradha Devi Thokchom, Savita, Poonam Rani, Vandana Katariya, Deepika, Namita Toppo, Sunita Lakra and Preeti Dubey. The team, however, got eliminated in the group stage where they were placed 6th.

In 2022 Commonwealth Games, Indian women hockey team won bronze medal. The team won a medal in common wealth games after 16 years.
