= Namita Toppo =

Indian field hockey player (born 1995)

Personal information
- Born: 4 June 1995 (age 31) Jaurumal, Sundergarh, Odisha, India
- Height: 1.63 m (5 ft 4 in)
- Weight: 53 kg (117 lb)

Sport
- Sport: Field hockey
- Position: Midfielder
- Club: Odisha Mining Corporation
Senior career
Years	Team	Caps	Goals
–	Hockey Odisha	-	-
–	Railways	-	-
–	Odisha Mining Corporation	-	-
National team
Years	Team	Caps	Goals
2011–	India U18		-
2012–2013	India U21		-
2012–2022	India	168	(6)
Medal record
Women's field hockey
Representing India
Asian Games
Silver medal – second place	2018 Jakarta	Team
Bronze medal – third place	2014 Incheon	Team
Asia Cup
Gold medal – first place	2017 Gifu
Bronze medal – third place	2013 Kuala Lumpur
Asian Champions Trophy
Gold medal – first place	2016 Singapore
Silver medal – second place	2013 Kakamigahara
Silver medal – second place	2018 Donghae
Junior World Cup
Bronze medal – third place	2013 Mönchengladbach
Junior Asia Cup
Silver medal – second place	2012 Bangkok
Girls' Asia Cup
Bronze medal – third place	2011 Bangkok

Namita Toppo (born 4 June 1995) is an Indian former field hockey player. She hails from Sundargarh District of Odisha. On 27 December 2020, she was conferred with the 28th Eklavya award. Toppo was honoured for her performance from April 1, 2018, to March 31, 2020, at both national and international levels.

== Career ==
Namita Toppo, born on 4 June 1995, is a midfielder and a product of Sports Hostel, Panposh, Rourkela, Odisha. Toppo made her state debut in 2007 and was then selected for Girls U-18 Asia Cup in Bangkok, Thailand where she was part of bronze medal-winning Indian team. Toppo represented the senior team for the first time in 2012 in the FIH champions challenge in Dublin. Namita was felicitated with Asuntra Lakra Award for the upcoming player of the year Award for 2014 by Hockey India. She made her 150th appearance for the national team against England in 2018 Women's Hockey World Cup in London. Namita was part of Olympic squad which represented India in the Rio Olympics after 36 years. Namita Toppo, was one of the four players, who were made to sit on the floor of the train while returning to their home from Rio Olympics.

== Awards and achievements ==
Namita has represented National Hockey team of India in more than 150 matches. On 27 December 2020, she was conferred with the prestigious 28th Ekalavya Award for her contribution to the game. Toppo was honoured for her performance from April 1, 2018, to March 31, 2020, at both national and international levels.

- Namita was felicitated by Mahanadi Coalfields limited in August 2014, with a cash award of Rs 1 lakh for helping India win bronze medal in the 2013 Junior women Hockey World Cup in Germany.
- Odisha government announced a cash award of Rs 75,000 for Namita for helping India win women's bronze medal in the 17th Asian Games at Incheon.
- She was felicitated with the Asunta Lakra Award for Upcoming Player of the Year 2014 (Women Under-21) and a purse of Rs

10 lakh by Hockey India in its annual award function at New Delhi on 28 March 2015.

- Received a special incentive of Rs 10 Lakh by Odisha Mining Corporation in 2016, for her participation in Rio Olympic Games.

=== International ===
- Helped India win the bronze medal in the Girls U-18 Asia Cup Hockey Championship at Bangkok, Thailand (25 September 2011).
- Represented Indian senior women's hockey team in the FIH World League (Round 2) at New Delhi from 18 to 24 February 2013.
- She was a part of the Indian team that won the bronze medal for the first time in Women's Junior Hockey World Cup at Monchengladbach in Germany on 4 July 2013.
- Represented the country in the 3rd Women's Asian Champions Trophy in Japan in 2013.
- Represented the country in the 8th Women's Asia Cup in Malaysia in 2013.
- Represented the country in the FIH Champions Challenge 1 in Glasgow in 2014.
- She was a part of the Indian team that won the women's hockey test series 6–0 against Malaysia held at Kualalumpur

from 9 to 17 June 2014.

- She was a member of the Indian women hockey team that won the bronze medal in the 17th Asian Games at Incheon (South Korea) on 1 October 2014.

=== National ===
- Represented Orissa in the Women's National Games in 2010 (Runners up)
- Represented Orissa in the Sub-junior National Championships in 2008 (3rd position).
- Represented Orissa in the National Inter-School Games in 2008 (3rd) and 2011 (Champion).
- Represented Orissa in the National School Games in 2009 (Champion) and 2011
- Represented Orissa in the National Rural Games in 2009 (Champion).
- Participated in the Junior Nehru Cup Tournament in 2007, 2008, 2009 (Champions), 2010 (3rd position).
- Represented Orissa in the Senior National Championship in 2011 (3rd position).
