= Sunita Lakra =

Indian hockey player

Personal information
- Born: 11 June 1991 (age 35) Rajgangpur, Odisha, India
- Height: 1.58 m (5 ft 2 in)
- Weight: 57 kg (126 lb)

Sport
- Sport: Field hockey
- Position: Defender
National team
Years	Team	Caps	Goals
2009–2019	India	155	(2)
Medal record
Women's field hockey
Representing India
Asian Games
Silver medal – second place	2018 Jakarta	Team
Bronze medal – third place	2014 Incheon	Team
Asia Cup
Gold medal – first place	2017 Gifu
Bronze medal – third place	2013 Kuala Lumpur
Asian Champions Trophy
Gold medal – first place	2016 Singapore
Silver medal – second place	2013 Kakamigahara
Silver medal – second place	2018 Donghae

Sunita Lakra (born 11 June 1991) is an Indian field hockey player. Lakra has represented her country by being capped in the India women's national field hockey team. Lakra announced her retirement from hockey through Hockey India on 2 January 2020.

== Early life ==
Lakra's father is a farmer. She was sent to join Sports Authority of India (SAI) in Rourkela to learn hockey when she was six years old. In Lakra's community, most girls and boys take up football from an early age, but Lakra's father believed that football was a dangerous sport and trained his daughter in hockey. She married Deepak Toppo who works for Odisa Police Department .

== Career ==
Sunita Lakra made her international debut in 2009, and has since then, cited as the backbone of the team. She was the part of the team in the 17th Asian Games and the Women's Hockey World League Round 2. India's clash against New Zealand in the Hawke's Bay Cup of 2015 marked the 50th international appearance of Lakra.

She plays defense in the team. Lakra completed her 100th international match with a match also against New Zealand in 2017, in the third match of the five match series. Lakra climbed the ladder of ranks in Indian hockey with significant performances at the 17th Asian Games and the 2016 Rio Olympics. She was also the part of the winning Indian side in the Asian Champions Trophy, in which the team won the final match against China. In 2017 August, she was selected to be a part of the India women's national field hockey team's 15-day European tour starting 5 September 2017.

Lakra was handed the responsibility to head the team as a captain in the Asian Champions Trophy women's hockey, which began at Donghae City, Korea in May 2018, and led the team to a second position.

Lakra is a part of the 18 member squad which is playing in the 14th edition of the Women's Hockey World Cup.
