= 2013 Women's Hockey Asia Cup =

International field hockey tournament

Tournament details
- Host country: Malaysia
- City: Kuala Lumpur
- Dates: 21–27 September
- Teams: 8 (from 1 confederation)
- Venue: Malaysia National Hockey Stadium

Final positions
- Champions: Japan (2nd title)
- Runner-up: South Korea
- Third place: India

Tournament statistics
- Matches played: 20
- Goals scored: 131 (6.55 per match)
- Top scorer: (South Korea) Kim Da-Rae (9 goals)
- Best player: (South Korea) Kim Jong-Eun

The 2013 Women's Hockey Asia Cup was the eighth tournament of the Women's Hockey Asia Cup. It was held in Kuala Lumpur, Malaysia from 21 to 27 September 2013.

All matches were held at Malaysia National Hockey Stadium.

== Preliminary round ==
All times are local (UTC+8).

=== Pool A ===
Pos	Team	Pld	W	D	L	GF	GA	GD	Pts	Qualification
1	China	3	3	0	0	11	0	+11	9	Semi-finals
2	India	3	2	0	1	15	1	+14	6	Semi-finals
3	Malaysia (H)	3	1	0	2	6	5	+1	3	
4	Hong Kong	3	0	0	3	0	26	−26	0	

Source: FIH
(H) Hosts

21 September 2013
18:30

Malaysia	0–3	China
	Report	Wang M. 15', 52'; Liang 68'

Umpires:
Soledad Iparraguirre (ARG)
Kim Jung-Hee (KOR)

21 September 2013
20:00

India	13–0	Hong Kong
Rani 5', 7', 23', 24', 26', 32', 58'; Kirandeep 6'; Vandana 13', 18', 38'; Poonam 68'; Joydeep 70+'	Report

Umpires:
Junko Wagatsuma (JPN)
Thanittha Chuangmanichot (THA)

22 September 2013
18:30

Malaysia	6–0	Hong Kong
Rabiatul 35+', 45', 67'; Fazilla 39', 58'; Hasliza 61'	Report

Umpires:
Amina Dyussembekova (KAZ)
Hong Chen (CHN)

22 September 2013
20:00

China	1–0	India
Wang M. 51'	Report

Umpires:
Amy Hassick (USA)
Kim Jung-Hee (KOR)

24 September 2013
18:00

China	7–0	Hong Kong
Peng 13'; Liang 27', 46', 51'; Xu 37'; Xi 42'; Wang N. 49'	Report

Umpires:
Kim Jung-Hee (KOR)
Amina Dyussembekova (KAZ)

24 September 2013
20:30

India	2–0	Malaysia
Poonam 38'; Mayengbam 45'	Report

Umpires:
Soledad Iparraguirre (ARG)
Amy Hassick (USA)

=== Pool B ===
Pos	Team	Pld	W	D	L	GF	GA	GD	Pts	Qualification
1	South Korea	3	3	0	0	31	3	+28	9	Semi-finals
2	Japan	3	2	0	1	25	3	+22	6	Semi-finals
3	Kazakhstan	3	1	0	2	4	24	−20	3	
4	Chinese Taipei	3	0	0	3	2	32	−30	0	

Source: FIH

21 September 2013
18:00

South Korea	12–1	Kazakhstan
Kim J. 19'; Cheon S. 25', 49', 53'; Han 35+'; Kim D. 36', 38', 39', 41'; Cheon E. 45'; Park M. 52', 55'	Report	Imangaliyeva 63'

Umpires:
Nor Piza Hassan (MAS)
Hong Chen (CHN)

21 September 2013
20:30

Japan	13–0	Chinese Taipei
Arai 6', 55'; Nakagawa 7'; Ueda 17', 19', 47'; Mano 18'; Sakai 21', 24', 34'; Shibata 25'; Y. Nagai 35+'; Oikawa 64'	Report

Umpires:
Anupama Puchimanda (IND)
Amy Hassick (USA)

22 September 2013
18:00

Kazakhstan	3–0	Chinese Taipei
Makhanova 6'; Domashneva 14'; Bolatbekova 70'	Report

Umpires:
Kitty Yau (HKG)
Junko Wagatsuma (JPN)

22 September 2013
20:30

Japan	0–3	South Korea
	Report	Kim J. 2'; Cheon S. 17'; Kim D. 22'

Umpires:
Soledad Iparraguirre (ARG)
Anupama Puchimanda (IND)

24 September 2013
18:30

Kazakhstan	0–12	Japan
	Report	Shibata 2', 19'; Arai 3', 40', 70'; Ota 8'; Nakagawa 15'; Ono 21'; Ueda 26', 59'; Sakai 64'; Mitsuhashi 68'

Umpires:
Thanittha Chuangmanichot (THA)
Hong Chen (CHN)

24 September 2013
20:00

South Korea	16–2	Chinese Taipei
Kim D. 4', 17', 34', 70'; Kim J. 8', 40', 42', 54'; Cheon E. 24', 55', 58'; Cheon S. 28', 48'; Park S. 46'; Lee Y. 50'; Park K. 61'	Report	Chen C. 20'; Su 26'

Umpires:
Kitty Yau (HKG)
Nor Piza Hassan (MAS)

== Classification round ==
=== Fifth to eighth place classification ===
Semi-finals
26 September
Malaysia	7
Chinese Taipei	0
26 September
Kazakhstan	5
Hong Kong	0

Final
27 September
Malaysia	5
Kazakhstan	1
Third place
27 September
Chinese Taipei	3
Hong Kong	1

==== Crossover ====
26 September 2013
15:45

Malaysia	7–0	Chinese Taipei
Norazlin 5'; Nadia 6'; Rabiatul 16'; Fazilla 35+', 36'; Siti R. 63'; Fatin 70'	Report

Umpires:
Amina Dyussembekova (KAZ)
Anupama Puchimanda (IND)

26 September 2013
18:00

Kazakhstan	5–0	Hong Kong
Makhanova 11', 41'; Gataulina 33'; Chepkassova 52'; Imangaliyeva 70'	Report

Umpires:
Junko Wagatsuma (JPN)
Amy Hassick (USA)

==== Seventh and eighth place ====
27 September 2013
15:45

Chinese Taipei	3–1	Hong Kong
Lin 42'; Su 57'; Chen H. 64'	Report	Wong 24'

Umpires:
Thanitta Chuangmanichot (THA)
Nor Piza Hassan (MAS)

==== Fifth and sixth place ====
27 September 2013
18:00

Malaysia	5–1	Kazakhstan
Rabiatul 10'; Fazilla 35+'; Norazlin 49'; Hasliza 59'; Siti R. 68'	Report	Khonina 24'

Umpires:
Kitty Yau (HKG)
Anupama Puchimanda (IND)

== Medal round ==
Semi-finals
26 September
China	1
Japan	4
26 September
South Korea	2
India	1

Final
27 September
Japan	2
South Korea	1
Third place
27 September
China	2 (2)
India (pen.)	2 (3)

=== Semi-finals ===
26 September 2013
15:45

South Korea	2–1	India
Cheon S. 2'; Cheon E. 10'	Report	Ritu 57'

Umpires:
Soledad Iparraguirre (ARG)
Hong Chen (CHN)

26 September 2013
18:00

China	1–4	Japan
Peng 52'	Report	Arai 9'; Shibata 19'; Otsuka 42'; Mitsuhashi 45'

Umpires:
Amy Hassick (USA)
Kim Jung-Hee (KOR)

=== Third and fourth place ===
27 September 2013
15:45

China	2–2	India
Yan 50'; Wu 64'	Report	A. Thokchom 16'; Vandana 31'
Penalties
Peng (penalty shoot-out scored); Cui (penalty shoot-out missed); De (penalty shoot-out missed); Liang (penalty shoot-out scored); Mao (penalty shoot-out missed) —— Peng (penalty shoot-out missed)	2–3	(penalty shoot-out missed) Rani; (penalty shoot-out missed) Vandana; (penalty shoot-out scored) Ritu; (penalty shoot-out scored) C. Thokchom; (penalty shoot-out missed) Deepika —— (penalty shoot-out scored) C. Thokchom

Umpires:
Amy Hassick (USA)
Kim Jung-Hee (KOR)

=== Final ===
27 September 2013
18:00

Japan	2–1	South Korea
Mitsuhashi 27'; Otsuka 53'	Report	Kim J. 69'

Umpires:
Soledad Iparraguirre (ARG)
Hong Chen (CHN)

== Awards ==
Player of the Tournament	Top Goalscorer	Goalkeeper of the Tournament	Most Promising Player	Player of the Final
(South Korea) Kim Jong-Eun	(South Korea) Kim Da-Rae	(India) Savita Punia	(Chinese Taipei) Wu Huang Yu	(Japan) Aki Mitsuhashi

== Statistics ==
=== Final standings ===
As per statistical convention in field hockey, matches decided in extra time are counted as wins and losses, while matches decided by penalty shoot-outs are counted as draws.

Pos	Team	Pld	W	D	L	GF	GA	GD	Pts	Status
1st place, gold medalist(s)	Japan	5	4	0	1	31	5	+26	12	Qualified for 2014 FIH World Cup
2nd place, silver medalist(s)	South Korea	5	4	0	1	34	6	+28	12	
3rd place, bronze medalist(s)	India	5	2	1	2	18	5	+13	7	
4	China	5	3	1	1	14	6	+8	10	
5	Malaysia (H)	5	3	0	2	18	6	+12	9	
6	Kazakhstan	5	2	0	3	10	29	−19	6	
7	Chinese Taipei	5	1	0	4	5	40	−35	3	
8	Hong Kong	5	0	0	5	1	34	−33	0	

Source: FIH
(H) Hosts

=== Goalscorers ===
There were 131 goals scored in 20 matches, for an average of 6.55 goals per match.

9 goals

- (South Korea) Kim Da-Rae

7 goals

- (India) Rani Rampal
- (South Korea) Kim Jong-Eun
- (South Korea) Cheon Seul-Ki

6 goals

- (Japan) Mazuki Arai

5 goals

- (Japan) Aya Ueda
- (Malaysia) Rabiatul Mohamed
- (Malaysia) Fazilla Sylvester
- (South Korea) Cheon Eun-Bi

4 goals

- (China) Liang Meiyu
- (India) Vandana Kataria
- (Japan) Shiho Sakai
- (Japan) Akane Shibata

3 goals

- (China) Wang Mengyu
- (Japan) Aki Mitsuhashi
- (Kazakhstan) Aigerim Makhanova

2 goals

- (China) Peng Yang
- (Chinese Taipei) Su Pei-Ling
- (India) Poonam Rani
- (Japan) Miyuki Nakagawa
- (Japan) Shiho Otsuka
- (Kazakhstan) Gulnara Imangaliyeva
- (Malaysia) Hasliza Ali Noor
- (Malaysia) Siti Ruhani
- (Malaysia) Norazlin Sumantri
- (South Korea) Park Mi-Hyun

1 goal

- (China) Wu Mengrong
- (China) Wang Na
- (China) Xu Xiaoxu
- (China) Xi Xiayun
- (China) Yan Yan
- (Chinese Taipei) Chen Chen-Tzu
- (Chinese Taipei) Chen Hsiu-Chin
- (Chinese Taipei) Lin Yi-Ching
- (Hong Kong) Wong Ching-Lung
- (India) Joydeep Kaur
- (India) Kirandeep Kaur
- (India) Lily Mayengbam
- (India) Ritu Rani
- (India) Anuradha Thokchom
- (Japan) Yukari Mano
- (Japan) Yuri Nagai
- (Japan) Shihori Oikawa
- (Japan) Mayumi Ono
- (Japan) Akiko Ota
- (Kazakhstan) Zhansaya Bolatbekova
- (Kazakhstan) Alissa Chepkassova
- (Kazakhstan) Vera Domashneva
- (Kazakhstan) Natalya Gataulina
- (Kazakhstan) Olga Khonina
- (Malaysia) Nadia Rahman
- (Malaysia) Fatin Sukri
- (South Korea) Han Hye-Lyoung
- (South Korea) Park Ki-Ju
- (South Korea) Park Seung-A
- (South Korea) Lee Young-Sil

Source: FIH

== See also ==
- 2013 Men's Hockey Asia Cup
