= Savita Punia =

Indian field hockey player

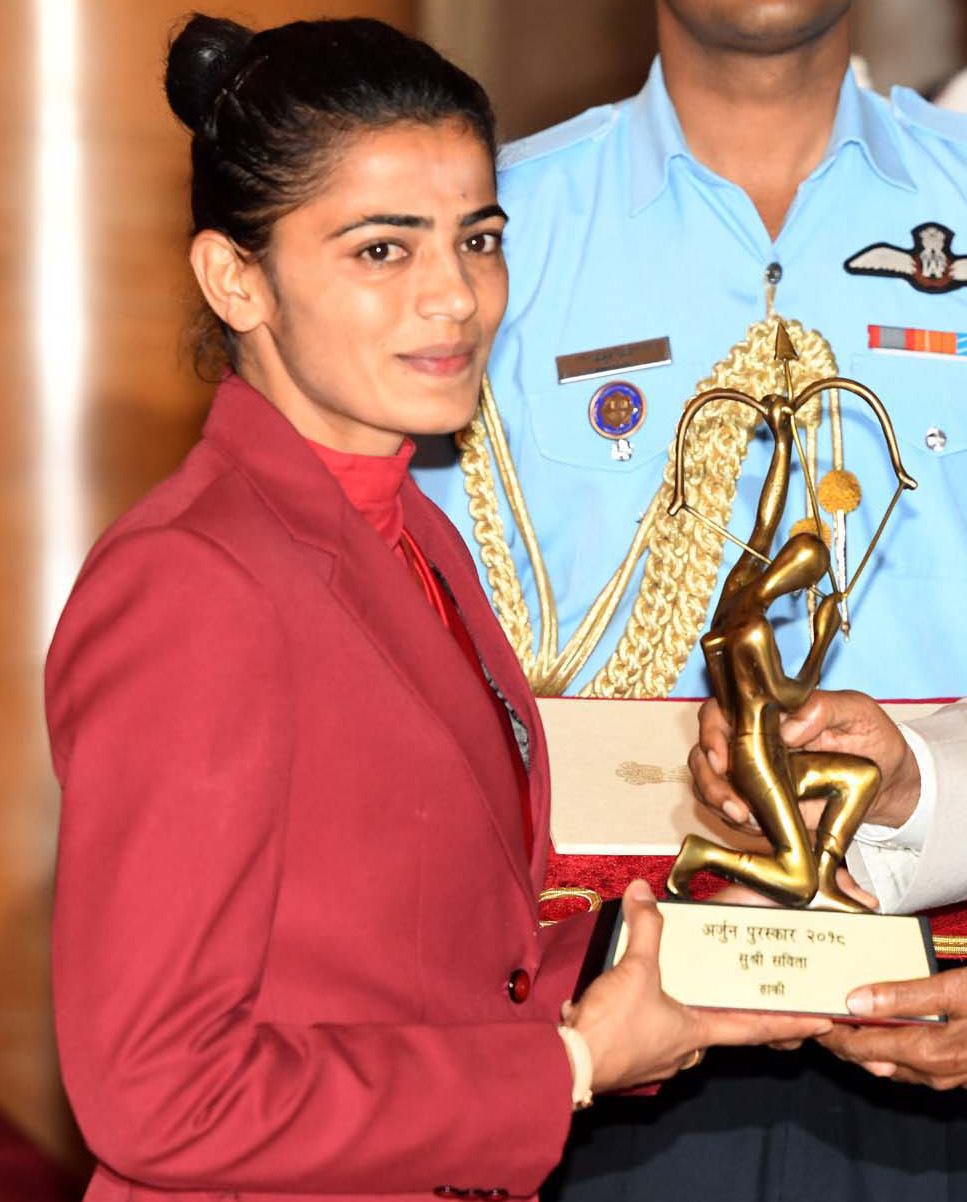
- Punia receiving the Arjuna Award, 2018

Personal information
- Born: 11 July 1990 (age 36) Jodhkan, Sirsa district, Haryana, India
- Height: 1.71 m (5 ft 7 in)
- Weight: 60 kg (132 lb)

Sport
- Sport: Field hockey
- Position: Goalkeeper
Senior career
Years	Team	Caps	Goals
2009–	Hockey Haryana	-	-
–	National Centre of Excellence	-	-
2025–	Soorma Hockey Club	-	-
National team
Years	Team	Caps	Goals
2009–	India	326	(0)
Medal record
Women's field hockey
Representing India
Commonwealth Games
Bronze medal – third place	2022 Birmingham	Team
Asian Games
Gold medal – first place	2026 Aichi-Nagoya	Team
Silver medal – second place	2018 Jakarta	Team
Bronze medal – third place	2014 Incheon	Team
Bronze medal – third place	2022 Hangzhou	Team
Asia Cup
Gold medal – first place	2017 Gifu
Silver medal – second place	2009 Bangkok
Bronze medal – third place	2013 Kuala Lumpur
Bronze medal – third place	2022 Muscat
Asian Champions Trophy
Gold medal – first place	2016 Singapore
Gold medal – first place	2023 Ranchi
Gold medal – first place	2024 Rajgir
Silver medal – second place	2013 Kakamigahara
Silver medal – second place	2018 Donghae
FIH Nations Cup
Gold medal – first place	2022 Spain

Savita Punia (born 11 July 1990) is an Indian field hockey player and a member of the India women's national team. She plays as the goalkeeper and is known as the Great Wall of India. Her performance at the 2020 Olympics is widely appreciated. She is the most capped player for India.

== Early and personal life ==
Savita Punia was born in Jodhkan village of Sirsa district in Haryana. She was sent to the district headquarters for better schooling. She was enrolled in the sports academy. She was encouraged by her grandfather Mahinder Singh to take up hockey and joined the Sports Authority of India center at Hisar. She was coached by Sunder Singh Kharab during her early years and later coached by Azad Singh Malik. She was initially not too interested in the game, but later, when her father spent Rs. 20,000 on her kit, she started to see the game in a new light and got serious about it. In 2007, Punia was picked for a maiden national camp in Lucknow, and she trained with a top goalkeeper.

She is married to software engineer and music composer, Ankit Balhara.

== Career ==
In 2008, Punia made her first international tour, a four-nation event in Netherlands and Germany. She made her senior international debut in the year 2011. She has featured in more than 100 games at the international level. She qualified for the national team in 2007 when she was barely 17. In 2009, she participated as a member of the team in the Junior Asia Cup. In 2013, she participated in the Eighth Women's Asia Cup held in Malaysia in which she saved two crucial potential goals in the penalty shoot-out and paved the way for India to win a bronze medal. She was a part of the bronze-winning team at the 2014 Incheon Asian Games.

In 2016, she withstood a barrage of penalty corners against Japan in the last minute to help India hold on to its 1–0 lead. She helped the team qualify for the Rio Olympics after 36 years. In the Asia Cup of 2018, she made an astonishing save against China in the final, earning herself the goalkeeper of the tournament award and for her team, a slot in the 2018 World Cup in London.

At the Hawke's Bay Cup in New Zealand, she helped her team finish 6th in the tournament.

Her outstanding performance helped the women's Indian team to beat Chile in the final match of the Women's Hockey World League Round 2.

In an interview in 2016, Punia revealed that she had been promised a job under the Haryana Government's Medal Lao, Naukri Pao scheme, but hadn't got it. A year later too, she said that nothing had changed.

In the gold medal match against China in the 2026 Asian Games, she blocked the penalty stroke from Zhang Ying, which helped India to win the match by 1–0 and clinched the Asiad gold after 44 years.

== Awards and nominations ==
She was awarded the Baljit Singh Goalkeeper of the Year award at the Hockey India Annual Awards in 2015, for having phenomenal performances for India in international contributions which proved her worth as the best goalkeeper in the country. She also received a cash reward of 1 lakh rupees for her contribution to the sports.

Year	Award	Category	Result	Ref.
2025	Hockey India Awards	Goalkeeper of the Year	Won	
2025	Hockey India Awards	Player of the Year Female	Won	

National honours

- 2018 – Arjuna Award, India's 2nd highest sporting honour
- 2026 – Padma Shri, India's 4th highest civilian award
