= Kim Hyun-ji =

South Korean field hockey player

Medal record

Women's field hockey

Representing South Korea

Asian Games
Gold medal – first place	2014 Incheon	Team

Asia Cup
Silver medal – second place	2022 Muscat	
Bronze medal – third place	2017 Gifu	

Asian Champions Trophy
Gold medal – first place	2018 Donghae	
Silver medal – second place	2021 Donghae	

- Kim Hyun-ji
- Hangul: 김현지
- RR: Gim Hyeonji
- MR: Kim Hyŏnji

Kim Hyun-ji (Korean: 김현지; born 4 November 1993) is a South Korean field hockey player. She competed for the South Korea women's national field hockey team at the 2016 Summer Olympics.

She won a gold medal as a member of the South Korean team at 2014 Asian Games.
