= Kim Da-rae =

South Korean hockey player (born 1987)

Medal record

Women's field hockey

Representing South Korea

Asian Games
Gold medal – first place	2014 Incheon	Team
Silver medal – second place	2010 Guangzhou	Team

Asia Cup
Silver medal – second place	2007 Hong Kong	
Silver medal – second place	2013 Kuala Lumpur	
Bronze medal – third place	2009 Bangkok	

Asian Champions Trophy
Gold medal – first place	2010 Busan	

Kim Da-Rae (born 3 February 1987, in Seoul) is a South Korean field hockey player. At the 2008 and 2012 Summer Olympics she competed with the Korea women's national field hockey team in the women's tournament. She competed at the 2010 and 2010 Asian Games.

She won a gold medal as a member of the South Korean team at 2014 Asian Games.
