= Lee Young-sil =

South Korean field hockey player

Personal information
- Born: 13 March 1987 (age 39) Seoul, South Korea
- Height: 1.67 m (5 ft 6 in)
- Weight: 57 kg (126 lb)

Sport
- Sport: Field hockey
National team
Years	Team	Caps	Goals
–	South Korea	119	-
Medal record
Women's field hockey
Representing South Korea
Asian Games
Gold medal – first place	2014 Incheon	Team
Asia Cup
Silver medal – second place	2013 Kuala Lumpur
Asian Champions Trophy
Gold medal – first place	2018 Donghae

- Lee Young-sil
- Hangul: 이영실
- RR: I Yeongsil
- MR: I Yŏngsil

Lee Young-sil (Korean: 이영실; born 13 March 1987) is a South Korean field hockey player. She competed for the South Korea women's national field hockey team at the 2016 Summer Olympics.

She won a gold medal as a member of the South Korean team at 2014 Asian Games and competed at the 2018 Asian Games
