= Ritu Rani =

Indian field hockey player

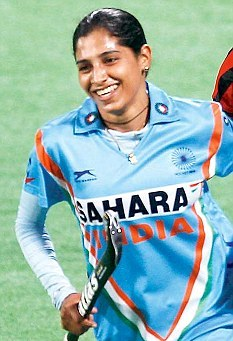

Personal information
- Born: 29 December 1991 (age 34) Haryana, India
- Height: 1.58 m (5 ft 2 in)

Sport
- Sport: Field hockey
- Position: Halfback
National team
Years	Team	Caps	Goals
2012–	India U21		-
2006–2016	India	240	(16)
Medal record
Women's field hockey
Representing India
Asian Games
Bronze medal – third place	2006 Doha	Team
Bronze medal – third place	2014 Incheon	Team
Asia Cup
Silver medal – second place	2009 Bangkok
Bronze medal – third place	2013 Kuala Lumpur
Asian Champions Trophy
Silver medal – second place	2013 Kakamigahara
Bronze medal – third place	2010 Busan
South Asian Games
Gold medal – first place	2016 Guwahati	Team
Junior Asia Cup
Silver medal – second place	2012 Bangkok
- Updated on 16 December 2017

Ritu Rani (born 29 December 1991) is an Indian former field hockey player, who represented the India women's national field hockey team. She also served as the captain of the national team. She plays as a halfback. Rani has led the team to medal winning performances most notably the bronze at the 2014 Asian Games. Also under her captaincy the team qualified for the Olympics after 36 years after finishing fifth in the 2014–15 Women's FIH Hockey World League Semifinals.

== Early life and career ==
Ritu Rani was born on 29 December 1991, in Haryana. She did her schooling at the Sri Guru Nanak Dev Sr. Higher Secondary School in Shahabad Markanda, Haryana. She took to hockey at the age of 9 and trained with the Shahbad Hockey Academy in Shahabad Markanda. Rani was employed with the Indian Railways until 2014, when she quit to join the Haryana Police. Rani trained at the Shahbad Hockey Academy at Shahabad.

== Career ==
Rani made her debut in the senior team in 2006, at the Asian Games in Doha. She was a part of the Indian team that played the 2006 World Cup in Madrid, and aged 14 at the time, she was the youngest in the squad. At the 2009 Champions Challenge II in Kazan, Russia, India won the tournament, with Rani finishing as the top scorer with eight goals to her name. She was appointed the captain of the team in 2011. Led by her, the team finished third at the 2013 Asia Cup in Kuala Lumpur and the 2014 Asian Games in Incheon, South Korea.

During the summer of 2015 when India hosted the Round 2 of the 2014–15 Women's FIH Hockey World League Rani led the team to finish on top to qualify for the next stage. She also led the side at the World League Semifinals held in Antwerp and the team finished in the fifth place beating higher ranked Japan in classification match. The Indian woman's national field hockey team thus qualified for the 2016 Summer Olympics for the first time since the 1980 Summer Olympics under her captaincy.

On qualifying for the 2016 Summer Olympics Rani said:

I've been dreaming of playing in Olympics for 10 years. It is an honour to be leading this group. Many of these girls won the (medal at) the junior world cup. Exposure against top teams has taught us what to expect in Rio. Even our seniors tried to make the cut, but fell at the final hurdle, losing to South Africa in 2012. But this team is special.

== Awards, rewards and recognition ==
- Arjuna Award - 2016
