= Deepika Thakur =

Indian field hockey player (born 1987)

Personal information
- Born: 7 February 1987 (age 39) Yamunanagar, Haryana, India
- Height: 1.66 m (5 ft 5 in)
- Weight: 56 kg (123 lb)

Sport
- Sport: Field hockey
- Position: Defender
National team
Years	Team	Caps	Goals
–	India	226	-
Medal record
Women's field hockey
Representing India
Asian Games
Silver medal – second place	2018 Jakarta	Team
Bronze medal – third place	2014 Incheon	Team
Asia Cup
Silver medal – second place	2009 Bangkok
Bronze medal – third place	2013 Kuala Lumpur
Asian Champions Trophy
Gold medal – first place	2016 Singapore
Silver medal – second place	2013 Kakamigahara
Silver medal – second place	2018 Donghae
Bronze medal – third place	2010 Busan
South Asian Games
Gold medal – first place	2016 Guwahati	Team
Junior Asia Cup
Bronze medal – third place	2004 Hyderabad

Deepika Thakur (born 7 February 1987) is an Indian field hockey player and is currently the most senior and highest capped player of Indian women's Team. She plays as a Defender in the senior team and has represented India over 200 outings and has scored 24 goals.

== Career ==
She hails from Haryana and is a product of Sports Hostel, Chandigarh. She works for Indian Railways. She has represented India in World Cup 2006 and 2010, Asian Games in 2010, 2014 and 2018 and Commonwealth Games in 2010 and 2014.

Deepika joined the Indian National Women's hockey team much against the wishes of her parents who wanted her to marry early. She postponed her marriage that was scheduled to happen in October 2016 in order to play for the 2016 Summer Olympics. Indian women's team qualified for the Rio Olympics 2016 after the gap of 36 years. Deepika was the vice-captain of that squad. Though India finished bottom of the group.

In the Asian Champions Trophy (2016) held in Malaysia, Indian women won their maiden title in which Deepika played an important role. She also got the ‘highest scorer of the tournament’ award.

India won gold medal at the South Asian Games, 2016. Deepika was part of the squad and scored one of the goals in the final match against Sri Lanka.

== Achievements ==
- 250 Match caps Milestone
- Asian Games 2018 (Jakarta- Indonesia) – Silver Medal
- 5th Asian Champian Trophy, Korea (2018) – Silver Medal
- Women Hockey World League Semifinal ( Vencouver- Canada) 2017 - Winner
- 4th Asian Champion Trophy (Singapore) (2016) – Gold Medal
- 12th SAF games (Guwahati – India) 2016 – Gold Medal
- FIH World League Round 2 (Delhi- India) 2015 - Winner
- Test match series India V/s Spain (Valencia- Spain) 2015 - Winner
- Test Series (Rome-Italy) 2014 - Winner
- 17th Asian games (Incheon-Korea) 2014 – Bronze Medal
- 8th Women Asia Cup (Malaysia) 2013 – Bronze Medal
- 3rd Asian Championship (Gifu-Japan) 2013 – Silver Medal
- FIH Olympic Qualifying Tournament (New Delhi-India) 2012- Silver Medal
- Test Match Series India v/s Azerbaizan (New Delhi -India) 2012- Winner
- Test Match Series (Australia) 2011 – 2nd Place
- 1st Asian Champion Trophy (Busan-Korea) 2010 – Bronze Medal
- 4 Nations Tournament (Germany)2010 – Bronze Medal
- 7th Asia Cup (Bangkok- Thailand) 2009 – Silver Medal
- Champion Challenge II (Kazan-Russia) 2009 - Gold Medal

== Awards and honours ==
- Member of selection Committee Khelo India 2021
- High Performance manager (Hockey) From Sports Authority of India
- Arjuna Award 2020 (Hockey)
- Dhruv Batra Player of the Year, Women (2015) in Hockey.
- Hockey India Defender of the year 2014
- GM Railways Award 2008

== See also ==
- List of Indian sportswomen
