= An Hyo-ju =

South Korean field hockey player (born 1987)

Personal information
- Born: 25 November 1987 (age 38)
- Height: 1.68 m (5 ft 6 in)
- Weight: 55 kg (121 lb)

Sport
- Sport: Field hockey
National team
Years	Team	Caps	Goals
–	South Korea	127	-
Medal record
Women's field hockey
Representing South Korea
Asian Games
Gold medal – first place	2014 Incheon	Team
Silver medal – second place	2022 Hangzhou	Team
Asian Cup
Bronze medal – third place	2017 Gifu
Asian Champions Trophy
Gold medal – first place	2010 Busan
Gold medal – first place	2018 Donghae

An Hyo-ju (Korean: 안효주, born 25 November 1987) is a South Korean field hockey player. She competed for the South Korea women's national field hockey team at the 2016 Summer Olympics.

She won a gold medal as a member of the South Korean team at 2014 Asian Games.
