= Sushila Chanu Pukhrambam =

Indian field hockey player (born 1992)

Sushila Chanu
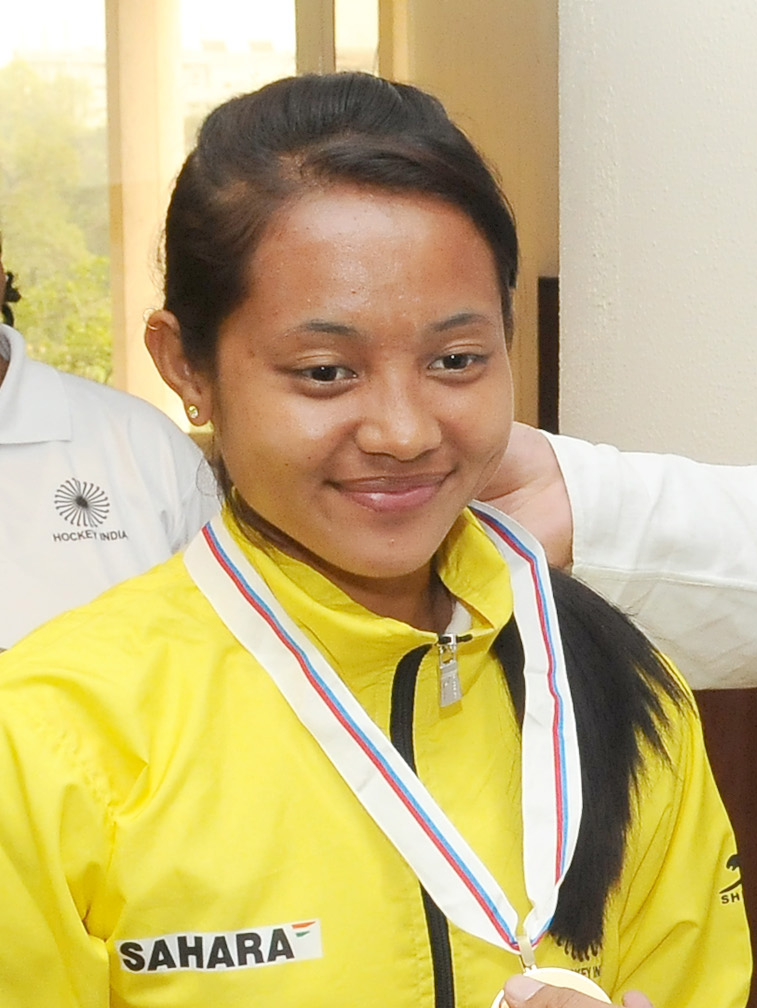
- Chanu in 2013

Personal information
- Full name: Sushila Chanu Pukhrambam
- Born: 25 February 1992 (age 34) Imphal, Manipur, India

Sport
- Sport: Field hockey
- Position: Halfback
Senior career
Years	Team	Caps	Goals
–	Manipur Hockey	-	-
–	Railways	-	-
2025–	Rarh Bengal Tigers	-	-
National team
Years	Team	Caps	Goals
2008–2013	India U21		-
2008–	India	275	(7)
Medal record
Women's field hockey
Representing India
Asian Games
Gold medal – first place	2026 Aichi–Nagoya	Team
Bronze medal – third place	2014 Incheon	Team
Bronze medal – third place	2022 Hangzhou	Team
Commonwealth Games
Bronze medal – third place	2022 Birmingham	Team
Asia Cup
Gold medal – first place	2017 Gifu
Bronze medal – third place	2013 Kuala Lumpur
Bronze medal – third place	2022 Muscat
Asian Champions Trophy
Gold medal – first place	2024 Rajgir
Silver medal – second place	2013 Kakamigahara
FIH Nations Cup
Gold medal – first place	2022 Spain
South Asian Games
Gold medal – first place	2016 Guwahati	Team
Junior World Cup
Bronze medal – third place	2013 Mönchengladbach
Junior Asia Cup
Silver medal – second place	2012 Bangkok
Bronze medal – third place	2008 Kuala Lumpur

Sushila Chanu Pukhrambam (Meitei: Pukhrambam Sushila Chanu, born 25 February 1992) is an Indian field hockey player from Manipur. A former captain of Indian national team, she played her 250th international match on 22 February 2025. She plays as a halfback for the team.

== Early life ==
Chanu was born in Imphal, Manipur, to Pukhrambam Shyamsundar and Pukhrambam Ongbi Lata. Her father is a driver and her mother is a home maker. Her great-grandfather, Pukhrambam Angangcha was a successful polo player. Chanu has an elder sister and a younger brother. Her interest in sports began when she accompanied her father to watch a football match during the 1999 National Games hosted in Manipur.

Chanu began playing hockey at the stadium the age of eleven, having been encouraged by her uncle to pick up the sport. He got her enrolled at the Posterior Hockey Academy in Manipur in 2002. She began playing in the Inter-school tournaments, and was subsequently selected for the team participating in Sub-junior and Junior National Hockey Championships, where she caught the attention of the national selection committee. She is employed in the Central Mumbai Railway since 2010 and is a senior ticket collector. She resides in the Railways quarters in Sion, Mumbai.

== Career ==
=== 2008–2013: Junior career and World Cup bronze ===
Chanu made her international debut at the 2008 Women's Hockey Junior Asia Cup, held in Kuala Lumpur, where India won a bronze medal. In 2009, she was dropped out of the team and she used that time to graduate from the Madhya Pradesh Hockey Academy, completing her course. She later, joined the joined Central Railways, Mumbai.

She led the Indian junior team to a bronze medal finish at the 2013 Junior World Cup at Mönchengladbach, Germany. Later, she made her debut in the senior national team, and was part of the squad that won the bronze medal at the 2014 Asian Games held at Incheon.

=== Senior India career, captaincy and Olympic debut ===
Chanu was part of the team that reached the semifinals of the 2014–15 Women's FIH Hockey World League held at Antwerp, Belgium. On returning home, Chanu along with Anuradha Thokchom and Lily Chanu Mayengbam given a warm reception in their hometown.

Ahead of the 2016 Rio Olympics, Chanu was named the captain of the national team. She led the team at the four-nation tournament in Australia that was held in May. Prior to the Olympics, she suffered a major knee injury and returned to training after eight weeks rehab. She captained the women's team that played Olympics after a gap of 36 years, after qualifying in Antwerp.

She played her 150th international match in Madrid, Spain during the Indian national team's June 2018 tour of Spain.

== Awards ==
She received the Arjuna Award from the President of India on 9 January 2024.
