= Mayumi Ono (field hockey) =

Japanese field hockey player

Personal information
- Born: 14 August 1984 (age 41) Toyama, Japan
- Height: 1.70 m (5 ft 7 in)
- Weight: 58 kg (128 lb)

Sport
- Sport: Field hockey
National team
Years	Team	Caps	Goals
2002–	Japan	241	-
Medal record
Women's field hockey
Representing Japan
Asian Games
Gold medal – first place	2018 Jakarta	Team
Silver medal – second place	2006 Doha	Team
Bronze medal – third place	2002 Busan	Team
Bronze medal – third place	2010 Guangzhou	Team
Asia Cup
Gold medal – first place	2007 Hong Kong
Gold medal – first place	2013 Kuala Lumpur
Asian Champions Trophy
Gold medal – first place	2013 Kakamigahara
Silver medal – second place	2010 Busan
Bronze medal – third place	2011 Ordos

Mayumi Ono (小野 真由美, Ono Mayumi; born 14 August 1984) is a Japanese former field hockey player who competed in the 2008 Summer Olympics.
