= Vandana Katariya =

Indian field hockey player

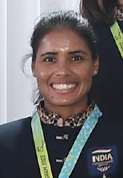
- Katariya in August 2022

Personal information
- Born: 15 April 1992 (age 34) Roshnabad, Uttar Pradesh (now Uttarakhand, India)
- Height: 1.59 m (5 ft 3 in)
- Weight: 50 kg (110 lb)

Sport
- Sport: Field hockey
- Position: Forward
Senior career
Years	Team	Caps	Goals
–	Uttar Pradesh Hockey	-	-
–	Railways	-	-
2025–	Rarh Bengal Tigers	-	-
National team
Years	Team	Caps	Goals
–2013	India U21		-
2009–2025	India	320	(158)
Medal record
Women's field hockey
Representing India
Asian Games
Silver medal – second place	2018 Jakarta	Team
Bronze medal – third place	2014 Incheon	Team
Bronze medal – third place	2022 Hangzhou	Team
Commonwealth Games
Bronze medal – third place	2022 Birmingham	Team
Asia Cup
Gold medal – first place	2017 Gifu
Bronze medal – third place	2013 Kuala Lumpur
Bronze medal – third place	2022 Muscat
Asian Champions Trophy
Gold medal – first place	2016 Singapore
Gold medal – first place	2023 Ranchi
Silver medal – second place	2013 Kakamigahara
Silver medal – second place	2018 Donghae
FIH Nations Cup
Gold medal – first place	2022 Spain
Junior World Cup
Bronze medal – third place	2013 Mönchengladbach
Junior Asia Cup
Silver medal – second place	2012 Bangkok

Vandana Katariya (born 15 April 1992) is a former Indian field hockey player who played as a forward for the Indian national team. After representing India in 320 matches and scoring 158 goals, she announced her retirement from international hockey on 1 April 2025. As of that date, she holds the record for the most caps in Indian women's hockey.

Vandana rose to prominence in 2013, being India's top goal-scorer in the 2013 Women's Hockey Junior World Cup, where India won a bronze medal; she scored five goals in the tournament, the third by any player. She is an ambassador of Beti Bachao Beti Padhao campaign.

She was a part of the Indian team that won a bronze medal at the 2014 Asian Games and represented India at the 2016 Rio Olympics. She has cited Argentine Luciana Aymar as her favorite player.

In March 2022, Kataria was awarded the Padma Shri, India's fourth-highest civilian award, in recognition of her distinguished contribution in the field of sports.

== Early life ==
Katariya was born at Roshnabad, Haridwar district in then Uttar Pradesh, now in Uttarakhand. Her father Nahar Singh works as a master technician in BHEL, Haridwar. She has been among the most improved players upfront for India in the last couple of years. The youngster first made her junior international debut in 2006 before going on to make her senior international debut in 209 at Kazan, Russia in the FIH Champions Challenge II Tournament.

== Career ==
Katariya was picked in the Indian junior team in 2006 and she made it to the senior national team in 2010. She was a part of the team that won bronze at the 2013 Junior World Cup in Mönchengladbach, Germany. She was India's top scorer in the tournament, having scored 5 goals in 4 games. In an interview she called the bronze medal her favorite moment, "It has to be when we won the bronze medal at the World Cup in Germany. My father was called by the media and he had tears in his eyes. So, making my father proud is the best moment of my hockey career." She won her 100th cap while playing against Canada in 2014 Commonwealth Games in Glasgow, Scotland. "We clearly missed Vandana during the Hawke's Bay Cup. Her being back in the team strengthens our attack as she is good with speed and skill, to break the defence chain, which at times leaves the opponents on the back foot," said Kataria's 21-year-old teammate Poonam Rani. Katariya was honored with Hockey India's Player of the Year Award in 2014. At the Round 2 of the 2014–15 FIH Hockey World League, she finished with 11 goals top-scorer, with India winning the tournament. "In my book, Vandana is one of the top forwards in world hockey. She is quick, can score goals, can defend and is improving all the time," Indian women's hockey team's stop-gap coach Roelant Oltmans said after her performance in Round 2 League. In November 2016, Katariya was retained as the skipper of the Indian women's hockey team for the Test Series against Australia and led the team in Melbourne from 23 to 30 November.

After qualifying for 2016 Summer Olympics Katariya said:

Our morale is high. Our performance in Antwerp gave us a lot of confidence. We beat a lot of teams that we'll be facing in Rio.

The Indian team won a silver at the Asian Champion Trophy, 2018, losing to Korea. Vandana Katariya won the player of the tournament award. Katariya played her 200th match in the third of the five-match series in India's tour of Spain in June 2018 ahead of the World Cup. She was named in the 16-member squad for the World Cup.

In the 2020 Summer Olympics in Tokyo, Vandana became first Indian woman to score an Olympic hat-trick in hockey. Her family was subjected to casteist slurs after India lost to Argentina in the semifinals. Certain upper-caste men allegedly hurled abuses at Katariya's family saying that the team lost the Olympic semifinal as it had too many Dalit players.

On August 8, 2021, she was appointed the brand ambassador of the centre's 'Beti Bachao, Beti Padhao Andolan'.

== International goals ==
No.	Date	Venue	Opponent	Score	Result	Competition
1.	10 September 2011	Ordos, China	Japan	1–0	2–3 (a.e.t.)	2011 Women's Asian Champions Trophy
