= Yu Qian (field hockey) =

Chinese field hockey player

Yu Qian (born March 25, 1992) is a Chinese field hockey player. She competed for the China women's national field hockey team at the 2016 Summer Olympics.
