= Shihori Oikawa =

Japanese field hockey player

Personal information
- Born: 12 March 1989 (age 37)
- Height: 1.64 m (5 ft 5 in)
- Weight: 58 kg (128 lb)

Sport
- Sport: Field hockey
National team
Years	Team	Caps	Goals
2013–	Japan	113	-
Medal record
Women's field hockey
Representing Japan
Asian Games
Gold medal – first place	2018 Jakarta	Team
Asia Cup
Gold medal – first place	2013 Kuala Lumpur
Gold medal – first place	2022 Muscat
Asian Champions Trophy
Gold medal – first place	2013 Kakamigahara
Gold medal – first place	2021 Donghae

Shihori Oikawa (及川 栞, Oikawa Shihori; born 12 March 1989) is a Japanese field hockey player for the Japanese national team.

She participated at the 2018 Women's Hockey World Cup.
