= Renuka Yadav =

Indian female field hockey player (born 1994)

Personal information
- Born: 18 July 1994 (age 32) Chhattisgarh, India

Sport
- Sport: Field hockey
- Position: Mid-fielder
National team
Years	Team	Caps	Goals
–	India		-
Medal record
Women's Field Hockey
Representing India
South Asian Games
Gold medal – first place	2016 Guwahati	Team

Renuka Yadav (born 18 July 1994) is an Indian female field hockey player. She is one of the youngest members of the national women's team that qualified for Rio Olympics 2016. She is from Rajnandgaon District of Chhattisgarh, which has also been called "the Hockey Nursery of India." She is the second from Chhattisgarh to qualify for the Olympics, after Leslie Claudius. She is first woman from Chhattisgarh to qualify for Olympics.
