= Mazuki Arai =

Japanese field hockey player

Personal information
- Born: 28 November 1988 (age 37) Japan

Sport
- Sport: Field hockey
- Position: Forward
Senior career
Years	Team	Caps	Goals
-2017	Coca-Cola Red Sparks	-	-
2018-2019	Harvestehuder THC	-	-
2019	Coca-Cola Red Sparks	-	-
National team
Years	Team	Caps	Goals
2009–2014	Japan	95	(42)
Medal record
Women's field hockey
Representing Japan
Asian Games
Bronze medal – third place	2010 Guangzhou	Team
Asia Cup
Gold medal – first place	2013 Kuala Lumpur	Team
Asian Champions Trophy
Gold medal – first place	2013 Kakamigahara	Team
Silver medal – second place	2010 Busan	Team
Champions Challenge
Bronze medal – third place	2009 Cape Town	Team

Mazuki Arai (Japanese: 新井 麻月, born 28 November 1988) is a retired field hockey player from Japan.

== Career ==
=== International hockey ===
Mazuki Arai made her debut for Japan in 2009, at the FIH Champions Challenge in Cape Town. The team won a bronze medal at the tournament, with Arai scoring twice. The following month she appeared at the Asia Cup in Bangkok.

In 2010, Arai won two medals with the national team. Her first was silver at the Asian Champions Trophy in Busan, followed by bronze at the Asian Games in Guangzhou. That year she also appeared at the FIH World Cup Qualifiers in Kazan, as well as the World Cup in Rosario.

Arai only made one appearance for the national team between 2011 and 2012 at the FIH Champions Trophy in Rosario.

2013 was Arai's most successful year with the national team, winning two gold medals. The first at the Asia Cup in Kuala Lumpur, and the second at the Asian Champions Trophy in Kakamigahara.

Mazuki Arai retired from international hockey in 2014, following appearances at the 2014 FIH World Cup in The Hague and the 2014 Asian Games in Incheon.

In December 2019, Arai ended her career.
