= Siti Ruhani =

Malaysian field hockey player

Personal information
- Full name: Siti Noor Amarina Ruhani
- Born: 11 January 1987 (age 39) Malaysia
- Height: 167 cm (5 ft 6 in)
- Weight: 57 kg (126 lb)

Sport
- Sport: Field hockey
- Position: Forward
National team
Years	Team	Caps	Goals
2006–2019	Malaysia	159	(32)
Medal record
Women's field hockey
Representing Malaysia
Asian Champions Trophy
Bronze medal – third place	2013 Kakamigahara	Team
Southeast Asian Games
Gold medal – first place	2013 Yangon	Team
Gold medal – first place	2015 Singapore	Team
Gold medal – first place	2017 Kuala Lumpur	Team

Siti Noor Amarina Ruhani (born 21 January 1987) is a field hockey player from Malaysia.

== Career ==
=== International hockey ===
Siti Ruhani made her international debut for Malaysia in 2006 at the Commonwealth Games in Melbourne.

Since her debut, Siti has been a mainstay in the Malaysian national team.

At the 2010 Commonwealth Games in New Delhi, Siti again represented the national team where they finished in tenth place.

In 2013, Siti won her first medal at a major tournament, taking home bronze at the Asian Champions Trophy in Kakamigahara. The following month, the team won gold at the SEA Games in Yangon.

Siti made her third and fourth consecutive Commonwealth Games appearances in 2014 and 2018, at the games in Glasgow and the Gold Coast.

Since 2015, Siti has been the captain of the national team.
