= Anuradha Devi Thokchom =

Indian field hockey player

Anuradha Devi
Personal information
- Full name: Anuradha Devi Thokchom
- Born: 2 February 1989 (age 37) Manipur, India

Sport
- Sport: Field hockey
- Position: Froward
National team
Years	Team	Caps	Goals
–	India		-
Medal record
Women's field hockey
Representing India
Asia Cup
Bronze medal – third place	2013 Kuala Lumpur
Asian Champions Trophy
Gold medal – first place	2016 Singapore
- Updated on 7 December 2015

Anuradha Devi Thokchom (Meitei: Thokchom Anuradha Devi, born 2 February 1989 at Toubul, Manipur, India) is a member of the Indian women's national field hockey team. Born and brought up in Toubul, Manipur, she began playing hockey at a young age and made her international debut in the 2006 Women's Hockey Champions Trophy. Thokchom plays as a forward for the Indian team and has more than 80 international caps to her credit.

Thokchom also participated in the 2016 Rio Olympics, where the Indian women's team had qualified after a gap of 36 years. She was praised by commentators for her roles in India team's victories at the 2014–15 Women's FIH Hockey World League, where they finished fifth to qualify for the Olympics.

== Personal life ==
Thokchom was born on 2 February 1988 in Toubul village of Bishnupur district, Manipur to Thokchom Churamani, who was a rickshaw puller and Thokchom Ongbi Komolini. She has three siblings; her elder brother was a football player. Her family was engaged in cultivation and pisciculture. Although she was herself interested in playing football, she began training in hockey under the guidance of her elder siblings. She said of the transition: "hockey came all of a sudden due to lack of footballers in my village." Thokchom played started playing Hockey at the Toubul Youth Club and later enrolled for the Imphal-based Posterior Hocker Academy Manipur. She is presently employed in the clerical department of the Indian Railways.

== Career ==
Thokchom briefly pltsined at Sports Authority of India institute in Gujarat, but left that in favour of Posterior Hockey Academy; she then represented Manipur in the national championships and caught the attention of the national selectors. She made her debut for the Indian women's national field hockey team in the 2006 Women's Hockey Champions Trophy. By the age of 26, Thokchom had played in eight international matches for the national team. She was then selected as a core probable for a regular spot in the national team; Thokchom talked about the mood in the camp under new coach Mathias Ahrens saying the team is more confident now just ahead of the 2014–15 Women's FIH Hockey World League. She said, "It has been a learning time under the new coach. We are feeling more confident as we realise that while we break the defence chain of opponents.

The Indian team finished fifth in the League Semifinals and qualified to the Olympics after a gap of 36 years. Thokchom played a significant role in the team's draw against the Japanese team in one of the decisive league matches; she carried the ball past the Japanese defence and earned the first penalty corner (which gave India the lead upon conversion) of the match. On qualifying for the 2016 Summer Olympics, she was all set to represent the nation at the Rio Olympics. On qualifying for the 2016 Summer Olympics Anuradha said:

Manipur doesn't have a tradition of hockey. I didn't have any hero to look up to.

Thockchom, Sushila Chanu, and Lily Chanu Mayengbam were praised for their contributions in the Indian women's hockey squad post the World League Semis. The three women also received a warm reception upon their return to Imphal.

Thokchom did not participate in the 2016–17 Women's FIH Hockey World League Semifinals held at Johannesburg, South Africa. Her absence was seen as an instrumental factor in the team's poor performance by such commentators as Jaspreet Sahni of Scroll.in. Sahni noted that without Thockchom as a let of the Indian attack, the team "not only lacked teeth but also kept losing possession in advantageous positions to concede turnovers".
