= Aki Mitsuhashi =

Japanese field hockey player (born 1989)

Medal record

Women's field hockey

Representing Japan

Asian Games
Bronze medal – third place	2010 Guangzhou	Team

Asia Cup
Gold medal – first place	2013 Kuala Lumpur	

Asian Champions Trophy
Gold medal – first place	2013 Kakamigahara	
Silver medal – second place	2010 Busan	
Bronze medal – third place	2011 Ordos	
Bronze medal – third place	2016 Singapore	

Aki Mitsuhashi (三橋 亜記, Mitsuhashi Aki; born 12 September 1989) is a Japanese field hockey player born in Kurihara. At the 2012 Summer Olympics and 2016 Summer Olympics she competed with the Japan women's national field hockey team in the women's tournament.
