= Shiho Otsuka =

Japanese field hockey player (born 1989)

Medal record

Women's field hockey

Representing Japan

Asian Games
Bronze medal – third place	2010 Guangzhou	Team

Asia Cup
Gold medal – first place	2013 Kuala Lumpur	

Asian Champions Trophy
Gold medal – first place	2013 Kakamigahara	
Silver medal – second place	2010 Busan	
Bronze medal – third place	2016 Singapore	

Shiho Otsuka (born 16 October 1989, Nita) is a Japanese field hockey player. At the 2012 Summer Olympics she competed with the Japan women's national field hockey team in the women's tournament.
