= Poonam Rani =

Indian field hockey player

Personal information
- Born: 8 February 1993 (age 33) Haryana, India

Sport
- Sport: Field hockey
National team
Years	Team	Caps	Goals
2011	India U18		-
2012–2013	India U21		-
2010–2018	India	195	(55)
Medal record
Women's field hockey
Representing India
Asian Games
Bronze medal – third place	2014 Incheon	Team
Asia Cup
Bronze medal – third place	2013 Kuala Lumpur
Asian Champions Trophy
Gold medal – first place	2016 Singapore
Silver medal – second place	2013 Kakamigahara
Bronze medal – third place	2010 Busan
Junior World Cup
Bronze medal – third place	2013 Mönchengladbach
Junior Asia Cup
Silver medal – second place	2012 Bangkok
Girls' Asia Cup
Bronze medal – third place	2011 Bangkok

Poonam Rani (born 8 February 1993) is an Indian field hockey player from Hisar, Haryana who was selected to represent India at the 2016 Rio Olympics. She is said to have been inspired to play hockey after watching India win the gold medal at the 2002 Commonwealth Games in Manchester, England.

She led the Indian girls' team to bronze medal at the 2011 Youth Asia Cup. She was part of the junior team that won 2013 World Cup bronze.

== See also ==
- List of Indian sportswomen
