= Miyuki Nakagawa =

Japanese field hockey player

Medal record

Women's field hockey

Representing Japan

Asian Games
Silver medal – second place	2006 Doha	Team
Bronze medal – third place	2010 Guangzhou	Team

Asia Cup
Gold medal – first place	2013 Kuala Lumpur	
Silver medal – second place	2004 New Delhi	

Asian Champions Trophy
Gold medal – first place	2013 Kakamigahara	
Silver medal – second place	2010 Busan	
Bronze medal – third place	2011 Ordos	

Miyuki Nakagawa (中川 未由希, Nakagawa Miyuki; born 20 December 1986 in Kakamigahara) is a Japanese field hockey player who competed in the 2004, 2008 and 2012 Summer Olympics.
