= Wang Na (field hockey) =

Chinese field hockey player (born 1994)

Medal record

Women's field hockey

Representing China

Asian Games
Silver medal – second place	2014 Incheon	Team competition

Asian Cup
Silver medal – second place	2017 Gifu	Team competition

Girls' Asia Cup
Silver medal – second place	2011 Bangkok	

Wang Na (born 5 August 1994) is a Chinese field hockey player. She competed for the China women's national field hockey team at the 2016 Summer Olympics.

She won a silver medal as a member of the Chinese team at 2014 Asian Games.
