= De Jiaojiao =

Chinese field hockey player (born 1990)

Medal record

Women's field hockey

Representing China

Asian Games
Gold medal – first place	2010 Guangzhou	Team
Silver medal – second place	2014 Incheon	Team
Bronze medal – third place	2018 Jakarta	Team

Asia Cup
Gold medal – first place	2009 Bangkok	Team

Asian Champions Trophy
Silver medal – second place	2011 Ordos	Team
Bronze medal – third place	2018 Donghae	Team

De Jiaojiao (Chinese: 德娇娇; born 5 January 1990) is a Chinese field hockey player. At the 2012 Summer Olympics she competed with the China women's national field hockey team in the women's tournament. She also competed with them at the 2016 Summer Olympics. From 2012 to 2016, De was on Tianjin Municipal Hockey Team.

She won a silver medal as a member of the Chinese team at the 2014 Asian Games, along with a gold at the 2010 Games and a bronze at the 2018 Games.
