= Peng Yang (field hockey) =

Chinese field hockey player

Personal information
- Born: 17 January 1992 (age 34)
- Height: 1.62 m (5 ft 4 in)
- Weight: 58 kg (128 lb)

Sport
- Sport: Field hockey
National team
Years	Team	Caps	Goals
2011–	China	165	-
Medal record
Women's field hockey
Representing China
Asian Games
Silver medal – second place	2014 Incheon	Team competition
Bronze medal – third place	2018 Jakarta	Team competition

Peng Yang (Chinese: 彭杨; 17 January 1992) is a Chinese field hockey player. At the 2012, 2016 and 2020 Summer Olympics she competed with the China women's national field hockey team in the women's tournament.

She won a silver medal as a member of the Chinese team at 2014 Asian Games, and the team that won bronze at the 2018 Asian Games.
