= Wang Mengyu =

Chinese field hockey player

Medal record

Women's field hockey

Representing China

Asian Games
Silver medal – second place	2014 Incheon	Team

Asian Champions Trophy
Silver medal – second place	2011 Ordos	

Wang Mengyu (Chinese: 王梦雨; 25 May 1992) is a Chinese field hockey player. Wang is from Yingkou, Liaoning. At the 2012 Summer Olympics she competed with the China women's national field hockey team in the women's tournament.

She won a silver medal as a member of the Chinese team at 2014 Asian Games.
