= Liang Meiyu =

Chinese field hockey player

Medal record

Women's field hockey

Representing China

Asian Games
Gold medal – first place	2022 Hangzhou	Team
Silver medal – second place	2014 Incheon	Team
Bronze medal – third place	2018 Jakarta	Team

Asian Cup
Silver medal – second place	2017 Gifu	Team competition

Girls' Asia Cup
Silver medal – second place	2011 Bangkok	

Liang Meiyu (Chinese: 梁美玉; born 8 January 1994) is a Chinese field hockey player. At the 2012 Summer Olympics she competed with the China women's national field hockey team in the women's tournament.

She won a silver medal as a member of the Chinese team at 2014 Asian Games. and competed at the 2020 Women's FIH Pro League.
