= 2017 Women's Hockey Asia Cup =

International field hockey tournament

Tournament details
- Host country: Japan
- City: Kakamigahara, Gifu
- Dates: 28 October – 5 November
- Teams: 8
- Venue: 1 (in 1 host city)

Final positions
- Champions: India (2nd title)
- Runner-up: China
- Third place: South Korea

Tournament statistics
- Matches played: 24
- Goals scored: 134 (5.58 per match)
- Top scorer: (China) Zhong Jiaqi (11 goals)

The 2017 Women's Hockey Asia Cup was the ninth edition of the Women's Hockey Asia Cup. It was held from 28 October to 5 November 2017 in Kakamigahara, Gifu, Japan. The winner of this tournament qualified for the 2018 World Cup in England.

India won their second title, after beating China in the final.

== Qualified teams ==
Dates	Event	Location	Quotas	Qualifiers
21–27 September 2013	2013 Asia Cup	Kuala Lumpur, Malaysia	6	China; India; Japan; Kazakhstan; Malaysia; South Korea
1–9 October 2016	2016 AHF Cup	Bangkok, Thailand	2	Singapore; Thailand
Total			8	

== Preliminary round ==
All times are local (UTC+9).

=== Pool A ===
Pos	Team	Pld	W	D	L	GF	GA	GD	Pts
1	India	3	3	0	0	16	1	+15	9
2	China	3	2	0	1	13	8	+5	6
3	Malaysia	3	1	0	2	12	7	+5	3
4	Singapore	3	0	0	3	0	25	−25	0

Source: AsiaHockey
Rules for classification: 1) points; 2) goal difference; 3) goals scored; 4) head-to-head result.

28 October 2017
12:30

China	5–4	Malaysia
Ye Jin. 3'; Zhong 7'; Chen Yi 26'; Yuan 57'; Liang 60'	Report	Othman 18'; Mansur 45', 48'; Onn 55'

Umpires:
Chieko Soma (JPN)
Catalina Montesino (CHI)

28 October 2017
14:30

India	10–0	Singapore
Navneet 3', 41'; Rani 15', 18'; Lalremsiami 18'; Ekka 25'; Navjot 30', 50'; Gurjit 42'; Sonika 45'	Report

Umpires:
Kim Yoon-seon (KOR)
Ornpimol Kittiteerasopon (THA)

30 October 2017
13:00

Malaysia	8–0	Singapore
Sukri 13'; Awang 15'; Said 19', 33'; Onn 25'; Rashid 28'; Hashim 36', 60'	Report

Umpires:
Ana Faias (POR)
Ornpimol Kittiteerasopon (THA)

30 October 2017
14:30

India	4–1	China
Gurjit 19'; Navjot 32'; Goyal 49'; Rani 58'	Report	Cui Q. 38'

Umpires:
Kelly Hudson (NZL)
Kim Yoon-seon (KOR)

Both matches were scheduled for 29 October, but were moved due to heavy rain.

31 October 2017
12:30

China	7–0	Singapore
Zhong 15', 21', 30', 36'; Chen Yi 43'; Qian 45'; Wang T. 59'	Report

Umpires:
Nur Hafizah Azman (MAS)
Amina Yelubayeva (KAZ)

31 October 2017
14:30

India	2–0	Malaysia
Kataria 54'; Gurjit 55'	Report

Umpires:
Chieko Soma (JPN)
Ana Faias (POR)

=== Pool B ===
Pos	Team	Pld	W	D	L	GF	GA	GD	Pts
1	South Korea	3	3	0	0	21	1	+20	9
2	Japan (H)	3	2	0	1	14	5	+9	6
3	Thailand	3	1	0	2	2	15	−13	3
4	Kazakhstan	3	0	0	3	1	17	−16	0

Source: AsiaHockey
Rules for classification: 1) points; 2) goal difference; 3) goals scored; 4) head-to-head result.
(H) Hosts

28 October 2017
16:30

South Korea	8–0	Thailand
Hong 4'; Park S. 9', 24', 36'; Jang H. 12', 50'; An 16'; Park M. 55'	Report

Umpires:
Miao Lin (CHN)
Durga Devi (IND)

28 October 2017
18:30

Japan	7–0	Kazakhstan
Nishinaga 14'; Kawamura 22', 36'; Karino 30'; Fujibayashi 36', 54'; Hirahara 42'	Report

Umpires:
Nur Hafizah Azman (MAS)
Cookie Tan (SIN)

30 October 2017
16:30

Thailand	1–0	Kazakhstan
Samanso 40'	Report

Umpires:
Nur Hafizah Azman (MAS)
Cookie Tan (SIN)

30 October 2017
18:30

Japan	0–4	South Korea
	Report	Kim J. 17'; Hong 21'; Park M. 32'; Park S. 59'

Umpires:
Miao Lin (CHN)
Durga Devi (IND)

31 October 2017
16:30

South Korea	9–1	Kazakhstan
Lee 1'; Park S. 7', 27', 36'; Cho H. 11'; Kim J. 20', 45'; Shin 57', 58'	Report	Domashneva 16'

Umpires:
Kelly Hudson (NZL)
Ornpimol Kittiteerasopon (THA)

31 October 2017
18:30

Japan	7–1	Thailand
Kanefuji 2'; Toriyama 3', 31'; Kawamura 11', 30'; Tsujii 20'; Nishinaga 27'	Report	Samanso 43'

Umpires:
Catalina Montesino (CHI)
Durga Devi (IND)

== Medal round ==
Fifth place
Malaysia	4
Thailand	0
Seventh place
Kazakhstan	3
Singapore	0

Consolation semifinals
Kazakhstan	1
Malaysia	2
Thailand (p.s.o.)	1(4)
Singapore	1(3)

Quarterfinals
India	7
Kazakhstan	1
Japan	2
Malaysia	0
China	10
Thailand	0
South Korea	9
Singapore	0

Semifinals
India	4
Japan	2
China	3
South Korea	2

Final
India (p.s.o.)	1 (5)
China	1 (4)
Third place
Japan	0
South Korea	1

=== Quarterfinals ===
2 November 2017
11:45

India	7–1	Kazakhstan
Gurjit 4', 42', 56'; Ekka 16', 41'; Navneet 22', 27'	Report	Domashneva 2'

Umpires:
Chieko Soma (JPN)
Catalina Montesino (CHI)

2 November 2017
14:00

China	10–0	Thailand
Zhong 3', 19', 47', 52', 54'; Zhang 4', 55'; Qian 12', 17'; Chen Yi 47'	Report

Umpires:
Kim Yoon-seon (KOR)
Cookie Tan (SIN)

2 November 2017
16:15

South Korea	9–0	Singapore
Kim J. 6'; Park S. 13', 16', 23'; Cho E. 26', 32'; Shin 27'; Cha Y. 43'; Lee 52'	Report

Umpires:
Miao Lin (CHN)
Nur Hafizah Azman (MAS)

2 November 2017
18:30

Japan	2–0	Malaysia
Matsumoto 48'; Hirahara 59'	Report

Umpires:
Kelly Hudson (NZL)
Ana Faias (POR)

=== Fifth to eighth place classification ===
==== Crossover ====
4 November 2017
11:45

Thailand	1–1	Singapore
Piresram 25'	Report	Tan 34'
Penalties
Piresram (penalty shoot-out scored); Samanso (penalty shoot-out missed); Wongkeaw (penalty shoot-out scored); Aunjai (penalty shoot-out scored); Sanpoung (penalty shoot-out missed); Piresram (penalty shoot-out scored)	4–3	(penalty shoot-out scored) Toh; (penalty shoot-out scored) T. Ong; (penalty shoot-out scored) Sanip; (penalty shoot-out missed) Hajaratih; (penalty shoot-out missed) Abdull; (penalty shoot-out missed) Toh

Umpires:
Miao Lin (CHN)
Catalina Montesino (CHI)

4 November 2017
14:00

Kazakhstan	1–2	Malaysia
Makhanova 24'	Report	Said 31'; Ruhani 33'

Umpires:
Chieko Soma (JPN)
Cookie Tan (SIN)

==== Seventh and eighth place ====
5 November 2017
11:45

Singapore	0-3	Kazakhstan
	Report	Shaymardanova 34'; Domashneva 51', 54'

Umpires:
Nur Hafizah Azman (MAS)
Catalina Montesino (CHI)

==== Fifth and sixth place ====
5 November 2017
14:00

Thailand	0–4	Malaysia
	Report	Saiuti 6'; Rashid 12', 58'; Onn 45'

Umpires:
Kim Yoon-seon (KOR)
Durga Devi (IND)

=== First to fourth place classification ===
==== Semi-finals ====
3 November 2017
16:15

China	3–2	South Korea
Liang 28'; Zhong 39'; Luo 51'	Report	Cho H. 6'; Kim J. 58'

Umpires:
Kelly Hudson (NZL)
Durga Devi (IND)

3 November 2017
18:30

India	4–2	Japan
Gurjit 7', 9'; Navjot 9'; Lalremsiami 38'	Report	Tsujii 17'; Ishibashi 28'

Umpires:
Ana Faias (POR)
Kim Yoon-seon (KOR)

==== Third and fourth place ====
5 November 2017
16:15

South Korea	1–0	Japan
Shin 1'	Report

Umpires:
Miao Lin (CHN)
Ana Faias (POR)

==== Final ====
5 November 2017
18:30

China	1–1	India
Luo 47'	Report	Navj. Kaur 25'
Penalties
Liang (penalty shoot-out scored); Xu (penalty shoot-out scored); Wang N. (penalty shoot-out scored); Chen Yi (penalty shoot-out scored); Cui Q. (penalty shoot-out missed); Liang (penalty shoot-out missed)	4–5	(penalty shoot-out scored) Rani; (penalty shoot-out scored) Malik; (penalty shoot-out scored) Navj. Kaur; (penalty shoot-out scored) Minz; (penalty shoot-out missed) Navn. Kaur; (penalty shoot-out scored) Rani

Umpires:
Kelly Hudson (NZL)
Chieko Soma (JPN)

== Final standings ==
Rank	Team
Gold medal	India
Silver medal	China
Bronze medal	South Korea
4	Japan
5	Malaysia
6	Thailand
7	Kazakhstan
8	Singapore

== See also ==
- 2017 Men's Hockey Asia Cup
