= Akane Shibata =

Japanese field hockey player

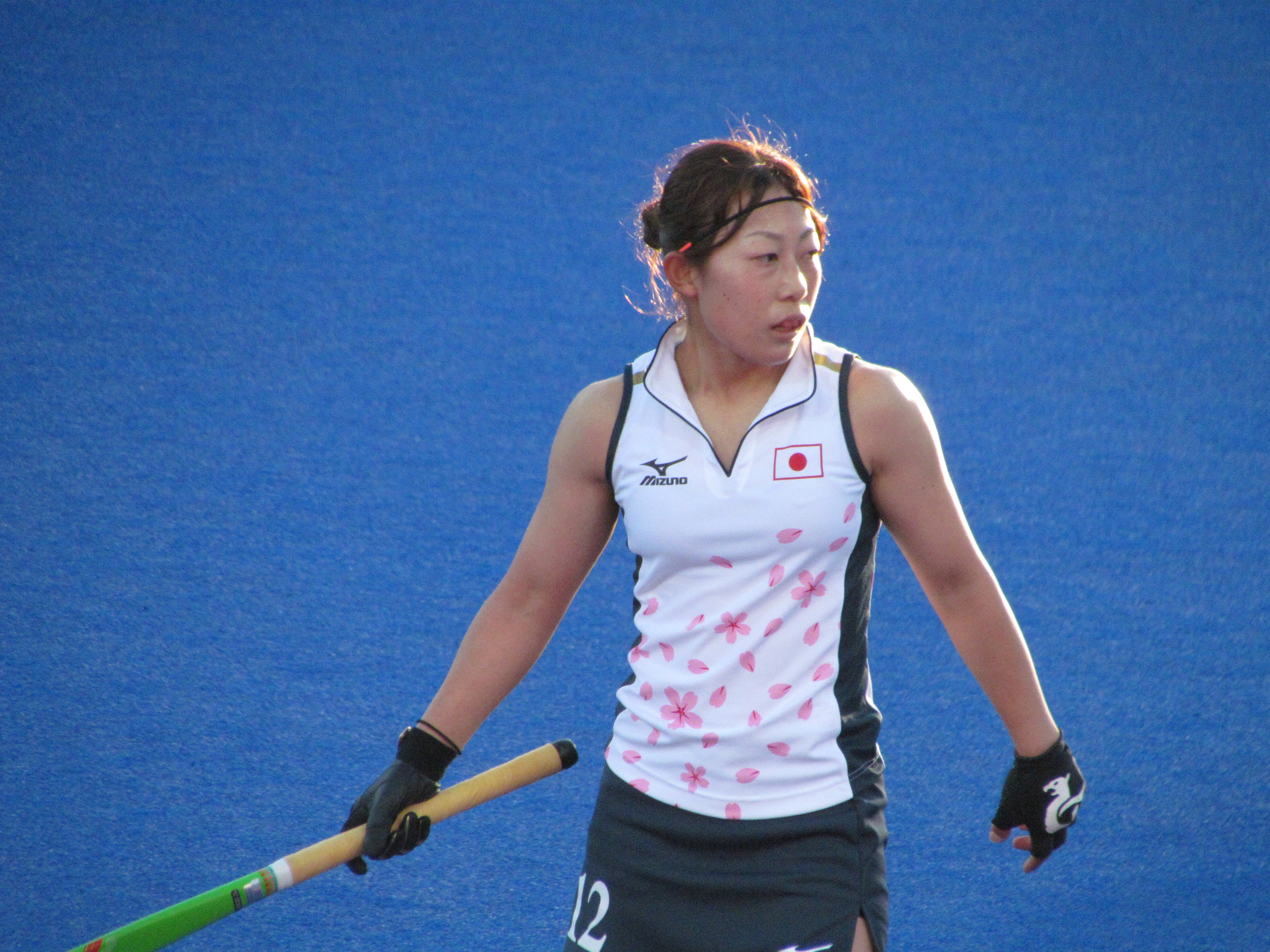

Personal information
- Born: 30 April 1988 (age 38) Nikkō, Japan
- Height: 1.53 m (5 ft 0 in)
- Weight: 50 kg (110 lb)

Sport
- Sport: Field hockey
National team
| Years | Team | Caps | Goals |
| 2011-2016 | Japan | 137 | (30) |
Medal record
Women's field hockey
Representing Japan
Asia Cup
| Gold medal – first place | 2013 Kuala Lumpur |
Asian Champions Trophy
| Gold medal – first place | 2013 Kakamigahara |
| Bronze medal – third place | 2011 Ordos |

Akane Shibata (柴田あかね, Shibata Akane; born 30 April 1988) is a Japanese field hockey player born in Nikkō. At the 2012 Summer Olympics she competed with the Japan women's national field hockey team in the women's tournament. She also played for Japan at the 2016 Summer Olympics.
