= 2013 Women's Asian Champions Trophy =

Field hockey tournament

Tournament details
- Host country: Japan
- City: Kakamigahara
- Dates: 2–9 November
- Teams: 4 (from 1 confederation)
- Venue: Green Stadium

Final positions
- Champions: Japan (1st title)
- Runner-up: India
- Third place: Malaysia

Tournament statistics
- Matches played: 8
- Goals scored: 29 (3.63 per match)
- Top scorer: (Japan) Mazuki Arai (5 goals)

The 2013 Women's Asian Champions Trophy was the third edition of the Women's Asian Champions Trophy. The tournament was held in Kakamigahara, Japan. Four Asian teams (China, India, Japan and Malaysia) participated in the tournament, which involved round-robin league among all teams followed by play-offs for final positions.

Japan won the tournament for their first title after defeating India 1–0 in the final.

== Teams ==
Below is the list of participating teams for the tournament

- India
- China
- Malaysia
- Japan

== Results ==
All times are Japan Standard Time (UTC+9)

=== Preliminary round ===
Pos	Team	Pld	W	D	L	GF	GA	GD	Pts	Qualification
1	Japan (H)	3	3	0	0	9	2	+7	9	Final
2	India	3	2	0	1	10	5	+5	6	Final
3	Malaysia	3	1	0	2	2	8	−6	3	Third-place game
4	China	3	0	0	3	3	9	−6	0	Third-place game

Source: Asian Champions Trophy
(H) Hosts

2 November 2013
10:30

Japan	3–0	Malaysia
Otsuka 5'; Arai 33', 37'	Report

Umpires:
Kang Hyun-young (KOR)
Suman Chumbak (IND)

2 November 2013
12:30

China	2–4	India
Yao 35'; Hao 58'	Report	Poonam 7', 64'; Amandeep 8'; Kataria 65'

Umpires:
Nur Hafizah Azman (MAS)
Yumiko Yasuoka (JPN)

4 November 2013
12:30

Japan	4–1	China
Arai 4', 12'; Otsuka 37'; Shibata 68'	Report	Gu 10'

Umpires:
Kang Hyun-young (KOR)
Suman Chumbak (IND)

4 November 2013
18:00

India	5–1	Malaysia
Poonam 24'; Manjit 46'; Kataria 52'; Amandeep 56'; Grace 65'	Report	Nadia 15'

Umpires:
Tang Li (CHN)
Yumiko Yasuoka (JPN)

7 November 2013
16:00

China	0–1	Malaysia
	Report	Surizan 44'

Umpires:
Kang Hyun-young (KOR)
Yumiko Yasuoka (JPN)

7 November 2013
18:00

India	1–2	Japan
Thokchom 33'	Report	Shibata 58'; Sakai 68'

Umpires:
Tang Li (CHN)
Nur Hafizah Azman (MAS)

=== Classification round ===
==== Third-place game ====
9 November 2013
12:30

Malaysia	3–1	China
Rabiatul 28', 43'; Hasliza 67'	Report	Gu 24'

Umpires:
Suman Chumbak (IND)
Yumiko Yasuoka (JPN)

==== Final ====
9 November 2013
15:00

Japan	1–0	India
Arai 2'	Report

Umpires:
Kang Hyun-young (KOR)
Nur Hafizah Azman (MAS)

== Final standings ==
Rank	Team
Gold medal	Japan
Silver medal	India
Bronze medal	Malaysia
4	China

== See also ==
- 2013 Men's Asian Champions Trophy
- 2013 Women's Hockey Asia Cup
