= India women's national field hockey team results (2025–2028) =

- Season: 2025–2028

This page documents the international match results of the India women's national field hockey team from 2025 to 2028. The results are organized chronologically by year and competition and include India's matches in major international tournaments and other unofficial fixtures during the period.

India won the 2026 Nations Cup title and re-entered to the 2026–27 Women's FIH Pro League. India clinched their second Asiad gold after 44 years, at the 2026 Games and sealed their place in the 2028 Olympics after missing Paris Olympics.

Competition	1st place, gold medalist(s)	2nd place, silver medalist(s)	3rd place, bronze medalist(s)
Asian Games	1	0	0
Asia Cup	0	1	0
Nations Cup	1	0	0
Total	2	1	0

== List of tours ==
Year	Host(s)	Competition	GP	W	D	L	GF	GA	Result	Position	Head Coach
2025	N/A	2024–25 Women's FIH Pro League	16	2	3	11	22	43	Relegated to 2026 Nations Cup	9th	(India) Harendra Singh
2025	Australia	Australia Test Series	5	1	0	4	8	13	–		(India) Harendra Singh
2025	China	2025 Women's Hockey Asia Cup	7	3	2	2	32	13	2nd place, silver medalist(s)	Runners-up	(India) Harendra Singh
2026
2026	India	2026 World Cup Qualifiers	5	3	1	1	11	5	Qualified to the 2026 World Cup	Runners-up	(Netherlands) Sjoerd Marijne
2026	Argentina	Argentina Test Series	4	1	1	2	5	7	–		(Netherlands) Sjoerd Marijne
2026	Australia	Australia Test Series	4	1	1	2	6	6	–		(Netherlands) Sjoerd Marijne
2026	New Zealand	2026 FIH Nations Cup	5	5	0	0	16	5	Promoted to the 2026–27 Pro League	Champions	(Netherlands) Sjoerd Marijne
2026	Germany; Netherlands	Friendly matches	3	0	0	3	0	6	–		(Netherlands) Sjoerd Marijne
2026	Belgium; Netherlands	2026 World Cup	6	2	3	1	11	6	Second round	5th	(Netherlands) Sjoerd Marijne
2026	Japan	2026 Asian Games	7	7	0	0	69	3	1st place, gold medalist(s)	Champions	(Netherlands) Sjoerd Marijne
2026	India	2026 Women's Asian Champions Trophy	3	3	0	0	13	2	TBD		(Netherlands) Sjoerd Marijne

== 2025 ==
15 February 2025 2024–25 FIH Pro League	India	3–2	England	Bhubaneswar, India
17:15	Vaishnavi 6'; Deepika 25'; Navneet 59'	Report	Bourne 12'; Crackles 58'	Stadium: Kalinga Stadium

16 February 2025 2024–25 FIH Pro League	India	2–2 (1–2 p)	England	Bhubaneswar, India
17:15	Navneet 53'; Rutuja 57'	Report	Gillott 40'; Howard 56'	Stadium: Kalinga Stadium
	Penalties
	Navneet (penalty shoot-out scored); Salima (penalty shoot-out missed); Sunelita (penalty shoot-out missed); Lalremsiami (penalty shoot-out missed); Neha (penalty shoot-out missed); Navneet (penalty shoot-out missed); Lalremsiami (penalty shoot-out missed)		(penalty shoot-out missed) Howard; (penalty shoot-out missed) Bourne; (penalty shoot-out missed) S. Hamilton; (penalty shoot-out missed) Crackles; (penalty shoot-out scored) Walker; (penalty shoot-out missed) Howard; (penalty shoot-out scored) S. Hamilton

18 February 2025 2024–25 FIH Pro League	India	3–4	Spain	Bhubaneswar, India
17:15	Baljeet 19'; Sakshi 38'; Rutuja 45'	Report	Rogoski 21'; Petchamé 25', 49'; L. Jiménez 52'	Stadium: Kalinga Stadium

19 February 2025 2024–25 FIH Pro League	India	0–1	Spain	Bhubaneswar, India
19:30		Report	Segú 49'	Stadium: Kalinga Stadium

21 February 2025 2024–25 FIH Pro League	India	0–4	Germany	Bhubaneswar, India
17:15		Report	Wortmann 3'; Schwabe 18', 47'; Hachenberg 59'	Stadium: Kalinga Stadium

22 February 2025 2024–25 FIH Pro League	India	1–0	Germany	Bhubaneswar, India
17:15	Deepika 12'	Report		Stadium: Kalinga Stadium

24 February 2025 2024–25 FIH Pro League	India	2–4	Netherlands	Bhubaneswar, India
17:15	Udita 18', 42'	Report	Reijnen 7'; Albers 34', 47'; Van der Elst 40'	Stadium: Kalinga Stadium

25 February 2025 2024–25 FIH Pro League	India	2–2 (2–1 p)	Netherlands	Bhubaneswar, India
17:15	Deepika 35'; Baljeet 43'	Report	Sanders 17'; Van der Elst 28'	Stadium: Kalinga Stadium
	Penalties
	Deepika (penalty shoot-out scored); Dungdung (penalty shoot-out missed); Khan (penalty shoot-out scored); Baljeet (penalty shoot-out missed)		(penalty shoot-out missed) Sanders; (penalty shoot-out scored) Veen; (penalty shoot-out missed) Van der Elst; (penalty shoot-out missed) Fokke; (penalty shoot-out missed) Dicke

26 April 2025 Australia–India Test Series	Australia A	5–3	India	Perth, Australia
	Flynn 3'; Downes 9'; Harris 11'; T. Stewart 21'; Fitzpatrick 44'	Report	M. Tete 27'; Navneet 45'; Lalremsiami 50'	Stadium: Perth Hockey Stadium

27 April 2025 Australia–India Test Series	Australia A	3–2	India	Perth, Australia
	Stansby 17'; Dolkens 48'; Surha 52'	Report	Jyoti 13'; Toppo 59'	Stadium: Perth Hockey Stadium

1 May 2025 Australia–India Test Series	Australia	2–0	India	Perth, Australia
	Schonell 9'; Stewart 52'	Report		Stadium: Perth Hockey Stadium

3 May 2025 Australia–India Test Series	Australia	3–2	India	Perth, Australia
	Stewart 2'; Smith 36'; Hayes 42'	Report	Navneet 35'; Lalremsiami 59'	Stadium: Perth Hockey Stadium

4 May 2025 Australia–India Test Series	Australia	0–1	India	Perth, Australia
		Report	Navneet 21'	Stadium: Perth Hockey Stadium

14 June 2025 2024–25 FIH Pro League	Australia	3–2	India	London, England
11:00	Schonell 16'; Pickering 22'; Stewart 35'	Report	Deepika 44'; Neha 52'	Stadium: Lee Valley Hockey and Tennis Centre

15 June 2025 2024–25 FIH Pro League	India	1–2	Australia	London, England
10:30	Phalke 3'	Report	Lawton 37'; Pickering 60'	Stadium: Lee Valley Hockey and Tennis Centre

17 June 2025 2024–25 FIH Pro League	Argentina	4–1	India	London, England
15:30	Falasco 29'; Gorzelany 40', 54', 59'	Report	Deepika 30'	Stadium: Lee Valley Hockey and Tennis Centre

18 June 2025 2024–25 FIH Pro League	India	2–2 (0–2 p)	Argentina	London, England
15:30	Navneet 50'; Deepika 56'	Report	Gorzelany 27', 37'	Stadium: Lee Valley Hockey and Tennis Centre
	Penalties
	Deepika (penalty shoot-out missed); Rutuja (penalty shoot-out missed); Lalremsiami (penalty shoot-out missed); Baljeet (penalty shoot-out missed)		(penalty shoot-out missed) Díaz; (penalty shoot-out scored) Bruggesser; (penalty shoot-out missed) Jankunas; (penalty shoot-out scored) Cairó

21 June 2025 2024–25 FIH Pro League	Belgium	5–1	India	Antwerp, Belgium
13:00	Brasseur 37', 55'; Breyne 41'; Ballenghien 54'; Engelbert 58'	Report	Deepika 6'	Stadium: Wilrijkse Plein

22 June 2025 2024–25 FIH Pro League	Belgium	2–0	India	Antwerp, Belgium
13:00	Ballenghien 40'; Hillewaert 43'	Report		Stadium: Wilrijkse Plein

28 June 2025 2024–25 FIH Pro League	China	3–0	India	Berlin, Germany
12:30	Chen 21'; Zhang 26'; Yu 45'	Report		Stadium: Ernst Reuter Sportfeld

29 June 2025 2024–25 FIH Pro League	India	2–3	China	Berlin, Germany
13:30	Toppo 9'; Rutuja 38'	Report	Zhang 19', 30'; Xu 53'	Stadium: Ernst Reuter Sportfeld

5 September 2025 2025 Asia Cup GS	India	11–0	Thailand	Hangzhou, China
14:30	Mumtaz 7', 49'; Sangita 10'; Navneet 16'; Lalremsiami 18'; Udita 30+', 52'; Beauty 45', 54'; Sharmila 57'; Rutuja 60'	Report		Stadium: Gongshu Canal Sports Park Field Hockey Field

6 September 2025 2025 Asia Cup GS	Japan	2–2	India	Hangzhou, China
19:00	Murayama 10'; Fujibayashi 58'	Report	Rutuja 30'; Navneet 60+'	Stadium: Gongshu Canal Sports Park Field Hockey Field

8 September 2025 2025 Asia Cup GS	India	12–0	Singapore	Hangzhou, China
14:30	Mumtaz 2', 32', 39'; Neha 11', 38'; Lalremsiami 13'; Navneet 14', 20', 28'; Udita 29'; Sharmila 45'; Rutuja 53'	Report		Stadium: Gongshu Canal Sports Park Field Hockey Field

10 September 2025 2025 Asia Cup Super4s	India	4–2	South Korea	Hangzhou, China
16:45	Phalke 2'; Sangita 33'; Lalremsiami 40'; Rutuja 59'	Report	Kim Yu-j. 33', 53'	Stadium: Gongshu Canal Sports Park Field Hockey Field

11 September 2025 2025 Asia Cup Super4s	India	1–4	China	Hangzhou, China
19:00	Mumtaz 38'	Report	Zou 4', 56'; Chen 31'; Tan 47'	Stadium: Gongshu Canal Sports Park Field Hockey Field

13 September 2025 2025 Asia Cup Super4s	Japan	1–1	India	Hangzhou, China
16:45	Kobayakawa 58'	Report	Dung Dung 7'	Stadium: Gongshu Canal Sports Park Field Hockey Field

14 September 2025 2025 Asia Cup Final	China	4–1	India	Hangzhou, China
20:00	Ou 21'; Li 41'; Zou 51'; Zhong 53'	Report	Navneet 1'	Stadium: Gongshu Canal Sports Park Field Hockey Field

== 2026 ==
8 March World Cup Qualifiers Pool B	India	4–0	Uruguay	Hyderabad, India
19:30	Annu 21'; Ishika 40'; Lalremsiami 49'; Rutuja 58'	Report		Stadium: G. M. C. Balayogi Hockey Ground

9 March World Cup Qualifiers Pool B	Scotland	2–2	India	Hyderabad, India
19:30	McEwan 6'; Burnet 33'	Report	Navneet 18'; Sunelita 29'	Stadium: G. M. C. Balayogi Hockey Ground

11 March World Cup Qualifiers Pool B	India	4–1	Wales	Hyderabad, India
19:30	Sakshi 7'; Navneet 29', 34', 55'	Report	Thomas 39'	Stadium: G. M. C. Balayogi Hockey Ground

13 March World Cup Qualifiers Semi-final	India	1–0	Italy	Hyderabad, India
19:30	Chauhan 40'	Report		Stadium: G. M. C. Balayogi Hockey Ground

14 March World Cup Qualifiers Final	England	2–0	India	Hyderabad, India
19:30	Balsdon 13'; Neal 43'	Report		Stadium: G. M. C. Balayogi Hockey Ground

13 April Tour of Argentina	Argentina	4–2	India	Buenos Aires, Argentina
19:30	Larsen 11'; V. Granatto 18'; Jankunas 42', 55'		Navneet 22'; Annu 29'	Stadium: Club Ciudad de Bolívar

14 April Tour of Argentina	Argentina	2–1	India	Buenos Aires, Argentina
19:30	Gorzelany 34', 48'		Ishika 22'	Stadium: Club Ciudad de Bolívar

16 April Tour of Argentina	Argentina	1–2	India	Buenos Aires, Argentina
19:30	Gorzelany 52'		Navneet 32'; Neha 37'	Stadium: Club Ciudad de Bolívar

17 April Tour of Argentina	Argentina	0–0 (2–3 p)	India	Buenos Aires, Argentina
19:30				Stadium: Club Ciudad de Bolívar

26 May Tour of Australia	Australia	2–1	India	Perth, Australia
17:00	Wilson 36', 53'	Report	Navneet 13'	Stadium: Perth Hockey Stadium

27 May Tour of Australia	Australia	1–1 (2–4 p)	India	Perth, Australia
17:00	Downes 10'	Report	Sushila 46'	Stadium: Perth Hockey Stadium
	Penalties
			(penalty shoot-out scored) Navneet; (penalty shoot-out scored) Ishika; (penalty shoot-out scored) Annu; (penalty shoot-out scored) Rutuja

29 May Tour of Australia	Australia	0–2	India	Perth, Australia
11:00		Report	Sonam 36'; Lalremsiami 49'	Stadium: Perth Hockey Stadium

30 May Tour of Australia	Australia	3–2	India	Perth, Australia
11:00	Wilson 42'; Downes 44'; Schonell 58'	Report	Navneet 2'; Soreng 23'	Stadium: Perth Hockey Stadium

15 June FIH Nations Cup Pool A	India	3–2	United States	Auckland, New Zealand
04:15	Deepika 17', 24'; Navneet 28'	Report	Sessa 4'; Zimmer 7'	Stadium: North Harbour Hockey Stadium

16 June FIH Nations Cup Pool A	Japan	1–2	India	Auckland, New Zealand
06:30	Hiramitsu 35'	Report	Salima 33'; Lalremsiami 49'	Stadium: North Harbour Hockey Stadium

18 June FIH Nations Cup Pool A	India	3–2	Uruguay	Auckland, New Zealand
04:15	Deepika 24', 56'; Soreng 43'	Report	Appennino 13'; Vilar 55'	Stadium: North Harbour Hockey Stadium

20 June FIH Nations Cup Semi-final	India	6–0	Chile	Auckland, New Zealand
09:30	Navneet 6', 13'; Deepika 14', 18'; Neha 32'; Rutuja 39'	Report		Stadium: North Harbour Hockey Stadium

21 June FIH Nations Cup Final	India	2–0	New Zealand	Auckland, New Zealand
12:00	Navneet 4'; Sunelita 15'	Report		Stadium: North Harbour Hockey Stadium

31 July Tour of Germany	Germany	3–0	India	Heilbronn, Germany
19:30		Report		Stadium: Hockey Club TSG

1 August Tour of Germany	Germany	1–0	India	Heilbronn, Germany
19:30		Report		Stadium: Hockey Club TSG

13 August Friendly Match	Netherlands	2–0	India
		Result

16 August World Cup Pool D	China	2–2	India	Amstelveen, Netherlands
16:30	Zhang 15'; Ma 39'	Report	Navneet 8'; Deepika 25'	Stadium: Wagener Stadium

18 August World Cup Pool D	India	6–1	South Africa	Amstelveen, Netherlands
18:30	Toppo 11'; Navneet 17'; Pukhrambam 25'; Deepika 38'; Lalremsiami 44'; Rana 45'	Report	de Waal 55'	Stadium: Wagener Stadium

20 August World Cup Pool D	India	0–0	England	Amstelveen, Netherlands
18:30		Report		Stadium: Wagener Stadium

21 August World Cup Pool E	Netherlands	2–0	India	Amstelveen, Netherlands
21:30	Y. Jansen 2'; Matla 38'	Report		Stadium: Wagener Stadium

23 August World Cup Pool E	Australia	0–0	India	Amstelveen, Netherlands
22:30		Report		Stadium: Wagener Stadium

27 August World Cup 5th place match	India	3–1	Germany	Amstelveen, Netherlands
18:30	Ishika 43'; Navneet 44', 47'	Report	Krings 59'	Stadium: Wagener Stadium

20 September Asian Games Pool B	India	19–0	Uzbekistan	Kakamigahara, Japan
07:30	Lalremsiami 7'; Deepika 8', 22', 25', 33', 36', 38', 41', 54'; Ishika 11', 42', 54'; Baljeet 12'; Neha 18'; Navneet 23', 45'; Lalthantluangi 43', 51'; Rana 43'	Report		Stadium: Gifu Prefectural Green Stadium

21 September Asian Games Pool B	India	17–1	Indonesia	Kakamigahara, Japan
09:30	Deepika 8', 28', 40'; Toppo 11', 30'; Lalremsiami 12', 16'; Pisal 15', 20', 38'; Rana 25', 57'; Tete 34'; Navneet 35', 56', 57'; Ishika 36'	Report	Aditiya 32'	Stadium: Gifu Prefectural Green Stadium

23 September Asian Games Pool B	Thailand	1–20	India	Kakamigahara, Japan
11:30	Samanso 57'	Report	Deepika 2', 8', 9', 24', 33', 36', 39', 51', 57'; Navneet 4', 29', 35', 51'; Pisal 10', 11', 47'; Neha 19'; Lalremsiami 26'; Rana 29'; Tete 45'	Stadium: Gifu Prefectural Green Stadium

25 September Asian Games Pool B	Japan	1–3	India	Kakamigahara, Japan
15:30	Kobayakawa 46'	Report	Lalremsiami 5'; Ishika 30'; Navneet 36'	Stadium: Gifu Prefectural Green Stadium

27 September Asian Games Pool B	India	7–0	Singapore	Kakamigahara, Japan
15:30	Tete 17'; Toppo 22', 24'; Lalremsiami 26'; Pisal 29'; Pradhan 35'; Deepika 55'	Report		Stadium: Gifu Prefectural Green Stadium

30 September Asian Games Semi-final	India	2–0	South Korea	Kakamigahara, Japan
15:30	Ishika 44'; Tete 48'	Report		Stadium: Gifu Prefectural Green Stadium

2 October Asian Games Gold medal match	China	0–1	India	Kakamigahara, Japan
16:30		Report	Lalremsiami 10'	Stadium: Gifu Prefectural Green Stadium

19 November 2026 ACT Round-robin	India	4–1	Malaysia	Bhopal, India
16:35	Mumtaz 20'; Tete 35'; Puja 39'; Lalremsiami 49'	Report	Zulkifli 19'	Stadium: Barkheda Nathu International Sports Complex

21 November 2026 ACT Round-robin	India	2–1	South Korea	Bhopal, India
19:00	Mumtaz 30'; Toppo 34'	Report	Hong 56'	Stadium: Barkheda Nathu International Sports Complex

22 November 2026 ACT Round-robin	Thailand	0–7	India	Bhopal, India
17:15		Report	Navneet 4', 56'; Deepika 10', 11', 56'; Mumtaz 28'; Toppo 32'	Stadium: Barkheda Nathu International Sports Complex

== See also ==
- India men's national field hockey team results (2025–2028)
