= 2026 Women's FIH Hockey World Cup Qualifiers squads =

This article lists the confirmed squads for the 2026 Women's FIH Hockey World Cup Qualifiers tournaments, held in Santiago, Chile and Hyderabad, India between 2 and 14 March 2026. The sixteen national teams were required to register a playing squad of eighteen players and two reserves.

== Tournament 1 ==
=== Australia ===
The squad was announced on 17 February 2026.

Head coach: (South Africa) Rhett Halkett

1. Claire Colwill (C)
2. Casey Dolkens
3. Morgan Mathison
4. Amy Lawton
6. Sarah Byrnes
7. Aleisha Power (GK)
11. Alice Arnott
12. Greta Hayes
13. Makayla Jones
14. Stephanie Kershaw
15. Kaitlin Nobbs (C)
17. Lucy Sharman
18. Alana Kavanagh
19. Jocelyn Bartram (GK)
20. Karri Somerville
22. Tatum Stewart
23. Olivia Downes
30. Grace Stewart (C)
31. Neasa Flynn
39. Mihaylia Howell

=== Canada ===
The squad was announced on 9 February 2026.

Head coach: (South Africa) Sheldon Rostron

1. Camilla MacGillivray (GK)
2. Nicole Poulakis
3. Thora Rae
4. Julia Ross
5. Brooke McCusker
7. Anna Mollenhauer
8. Elise Wong (C)
9. Jordyn Faiczak
10. Chloe Walton
11. Kenzie Girgis
14. Rebecca Carvalho
16. Rylie Novak
17. Mikayla Stelling
20. Libby Hogg
21. Nora Goddard-Despot
22. Danielle Husar
23. Allison Kuzyk
24. Katherine Gibb
27. Laine Delmotte
34. Marcia LaPlante (GK)

=== Chile ===
The squad was announced on 23 February 2026.

Head coach: Cristóbal Rodríguez

3. Fernanda Villagrán
4. Doménica Ananías
5. Denise Rojas
6. Fernanda Flores
7. Sofía Filipek
8. María Maldonado
9. Fernanda Arrieta
10. Manuela Urroz (C)
11. Josefa Salas
12. Beatriz Wirth (GK)
15. Simone Avelli
16. Constanza Palma
17. Francisca Irazoqui
18. Laura Müller
19. Agustina Solano
21. Antonia Irazoqui
22. Paula Valdivia
23. Florencia Barrios
28. Natalia Salvador (GK)
31. Constanza Muñoz

=== France ===
The squad was announced on 18 February 2026.

Head coach: (United States) Ben Howarth

3. Charlotte Durachta
4. Emma Ponthieu (C)
5. Mickaela Lahlah
6. Marie-Alice Pelletier Rimbert
7. Paola Le Nindre
8. Yohanna Lhopital
9. Délia Baudena
10. Violette Blanquart
14. Maiwen Cadiou de Fresquet
15. Emma van der Zanden
17. Alissia de Vries
18. Mazarine Proux
19. Mathilde Duffrène
21. Pauline Varoqui
22. Eve Verzura
24. Lucie Ehrmann (GK)
25. Albane Garot
27. Delfina Gaspari
29. Léopoldine Coppin
33. Amelya Lison (GK)

=== Ireland ===
The squad was announced on 20 February 2026.

Head coach: Gareth Grundie

2. Elizabeth Murphy (GK)
3. Sarah McAuley
5. Michelle Carey
6. Róisín Upton
7. Niamh Carey
8. Sarah Hawkshaw (C)
9. Kathryn Mullan
10. Hannah McLoughlin
11. Sarah Torrans
14. Ellen Curran
15. Caoimhe Perdue
16. Charlotte Beggs
17. Christina Hamill
23. Holly Micklem (GK)
26. Amy Handcock
27. Jessica McMaster
28. Katie Larmour
30. Emily Kealy
31. Mia Jennings
33. Lisa Mulcahy

=== Japan ===
The squad was announced on 11 February 2026.

Head coach: Akira Takahashi

1. Akio Tanaka (GK)
2. Miyu Suzuki
3. Ikumi Matsu
4. Hanami Saito
5. Nanako Tateiwa
6. Emi Nishikori
7. Mayuri Horikawa
8. Shiho Kobayakawa
9. Mai Toriyama
10. Amiru Shimada (C)
11. Akari Nakagomi
13. Hiroka Murayama
16. Saki Tanaka
17. Miyu Hasegawa
18. Yu Kudo (GK)
20. Mei Matsunami
22. Ai Hiramatsu
25. Haruka Kawaguchi
26. Maiko Mikami
32. Junon Kawai

=== Malaysia ===
Head coach: Mohamed Nasihin Nubil Ibrahim

1. Siti Nasir (GK)
2. Zati Muhamad
4. Siti Mohd (b. 2004)
5. Dayang Abang
6. Zawiatul Hartomo
8. Juliani Din (C)
10. Siti Mohd (b. 2001)
11. Nur Azhar
13. Nur Mohd
14. Siti Shaikh
15. Nur Che
18. Nur Mohammed
19. Insyirah Effarizal
21. Fatin Sukri
22. Siti Husain
25. Khairunnisa Mohd
26. Nuramirah Zulkifli
27. Nurmaizatul Syafi
32. Nur Zainal (GK)
35. Noor Hasliza Ali

=== Switzerland ===
Head coach: Jorge Nolte

2. Dorine van Overbeck (GK)
3. Nele Pöhler
4. Sofie Stomps
5. Maria Rosso
6. Dunja Härtsch
7. Sina Muggli
8. Diana Hoxhaj
11. Stephanie Weber (C)
12. Anja Hardeman
16. Charline Heselhaus
19. Paulina Appel
20. Elena Trösch
21. Raffaela Trieboldl
22. Ria Müller
23. Tamara Trösch
26. Leonor Berlie
28. Maya Flury
29. Lea Kim
33. Ursina Fazis (GK)

== Tournament 2 ==
=== Austria ===
Head coach: Christian Hoffman

2. Carla Kemper
4. Luisa Mayer
5. Helene Herzog
6. Johanna Czech (C)
9. Elena Lendl (GK)
10. Kristine Vukovich
11. Katharina Bauer
12. Amelie Minar
14. Philippa Proksch
15. Katharina Proksch
17. Marie Hahnenkamp
19. Laura Kern
21. Marianne Pultar
24. Daria Buchta
25. Fiona Felber
28. Anja Haselsteiner
29. Celina Kölbl
33. Michaela Streb (GK)

=== England ===
The squad was announced on 26 February 2026.

Head coach: (Scotland) David Ralph

2. Darcy Bourne
3. Rebecca Manton
4. Lily Walker (C)
5. Alexandra Malzer
6. Anna Toman
10. Amy Thompson
11. Holly Hunt
13. Elena Rayer
14. Tessa Howard
18. Katharine Curtis
21. Fiona Crackles
22. Elizabeth Neal
23. Sophie Hamilton
25. Sabrina Heesh (GK)
26. Lily Owsley
28. Flora Peel (C)
30. Martha Taylor
31. Grace Balsdon
40. Miriam Pritchard (GK)
44. Charlotte Bingham

=== India ===
The squad was announced on 1 March 2026.

Head coach: (India) manish Jakhar Padampur

6. Ishika Chaudhary
8. Nikki Pradhan
9. Bichu Devi Kharibam (GK)
10. Bansari Solanki (GK)
15. Ishika
18. Udita Duhan
19. Vaishnavi Phalke
20. Lalremsiami Hmarzote
21. Deepika Soreng
22. Baljeet Kaur
25. Navneet Kaur
27. Sushila Chanu
28. Neha Goyal
29. Sunelita Toppo
30. Salima Tete (C)
35. Rutaja Pisal
39. Sakshi Rana
45. Manisha Chauhan
47. Annu
52. Beauty Dungdung

=== Italy ===
The squad was announced on 24 February 2026.

Head coach: Massimo Lanzano

2. Maria Torbol
3. Teresa Dalla Vittoria
5. Ailin Oviedo
6. Martina Grinbaum
7. Emilia Munitis
8. Eleonora di Paola
9. Guadalupe Moras
12. Lucia Ines Caruso (GK)
13. Lola Brea
15. Maria Lunghi
16. Ilaria Sarnari
17. Elettra Bormida
18. Federica Carta (C)
21. Sara Puglisi (C)
22. Maria Agustina Fiorelli
25. Delfina Granatto
26. Sofía Laurito
28. Sofia Maldonado
28. Ivanna Pessina
32. Maria Pastor (GK)

=== Scotland ===
The squad was announced on 6 February 2026.

Head coach: Chris Duncan

1. Jennifer Eadie
4. Eve Pearson
5. Lucy Harris (GK)
7. Ava Wadsworth
8. Amy Costello
10. Sarah Robertson (C)
11. Katie Birch
12. Charlotte Watson
13. Ruth Blaikie
15. Heather McEwan
17. Sarah Jamieson
18. Millie Steiger
20. Bronwyn Shields
21. Jessica Martin
23. Jessica Buchanan (GK)
27. Fiona Burnet
30. Katherine Holdgate
32. Connie Roxburgh
35. Ellie Mackenzie
37. Ava Findlay

=== South Korea ===
Head coach: Kim Yong-soo

1. Lee Seo-yeon (GK)
2. Lee Ju-yeon
4. Hong Solbeotnara
5. Kim Jung-ju
6. Lee Yu-jin
7. Lee Yu-ri (C)
8. Kim Seo-na
9. Park Seung-ae
11. Cho Hye-jin
12. Choi Ji-yun
13. Mun Seung-hwa
14. Ji Yu-jin
15. Choi Sara
16. Kim Ji-won (GK)
17. Jin Su-yeon
18. Park Yeong-eun
19. Kim Min-ji
22. Jin Min-young
23. Lee Ga-eun
25. Jeong Ran-kyong

=== Uruguay ===
Head coach: Rolando Rivero

2. Florencia Peñalba
3. Manuela Vilar (C)
4. Elisa Civetta
6. Miranda Martínez (GK)
7. Matina Rago
8. Magdalena Verga
10. Manuela Quiñones
11. Magdalena Gómez
13. Guadalupe Curutchague
14. Paula Pérez
15. Agustina Martínez
16. Clementina Cristiani
17. Teresa Viana
18. Agustina Díaz
19. María Barreiro
20. Chiara Curcio
22. Lucía Olascoaga
23. Jacinta Curutchague
31. María Rodríguez
32. María Bate (GK)

=== Wales ===
Squad not yet named.
