= 2025–26 Women's FIH Hockey Nations Cup =

International field hockey tournament

Tournament details
- Host country: New Zealand
- City: Auckland
- Dates: 15–21 June
- Teams: 8 (from 4 confederations)
- Venue: North Harbour Hockey Stadium

Final positions
- Champions: India (2nd title)
- Runner-up: New Zealand
- Third place: United States

Tournament statistics
- Matches played: 20
- Goals scored: 73 (3.65 per match)
- Top scorer(s): (India) Deepika Sehrawat (United States) Ashley Sessa (6 goals)
- Best player: (United States) Ashley Sessa
- Best young player: (New Zealand) Riana Pho
- Best goalkeeper: (New Zealand) Grace O'Hanlon

The 2025–26 Women's FIH Hockey Nations Cup was the fourth edition of the Women's FIH Hockey Nations Cup, the annual qualification tournament for the FIH Pro League organised by the International Hockey Federation. The tournament was held at the National Hockey Centre in Auckland, New Zealand from 15 to 21 June 2026.

Hosts New Zealand were the defending champions, having rejected the invitation from the International Hockey Federation to join the 2025–26 FIH Pro League. India won the title for the second time, defeating New Zealand in the final.

== Qualified teams ==
Teams qualified for the event through three pathways, the 2024–25 editions of the FIH Pro League, Nations Cup and Nations Cup 2.

Dates	Event	Location	Quotas	Qualifiers
30 November 2024 – 29 June 2025	2024–25 FIH Pro League	Various	1	India
23 February – 2 March 2025	2024–25 FIH Nations Cup	Santiago, Chile	4	Chile; Japan; ~~Scotland~~^{A} South Korea; United States
16–22 June 2025	2024–25 FIH Nations Cup 2	Wałcz, Poland	2	France; Uruguay^{A}
16 March 2026	Host Nation		1	New Zealand
Total			8	

^A – Scotland withdrew and were replaced by Uruguay to the 2025–26 Women's FIH Hockey Nations Cup.

== Squads ==
Chile

Head Coach: Cristóbal Rodríguez

3. Fernanda Villagrán
4. Doménica Ananías
5. Denise Rojas
6. Fernanda Flores
7. Sofía Filipek
8. María Maldonado
9. Fernanda Arrieta
10. Manuela Urroz (C)
11. Josefa Salas
15. Simone Avelli
16. Constanza Palma
17. Francisca Irazoqui
19. Agustina Solano
21. Antonia Irazoqui
22. Paula Valdivia
23. Florencia Barrios
28. Natalia Salvador (GK)
29. Antonia Sáez (GK)
31. Constanza Muñoz
36. Antonia Morales
France

Head Coach: (United States) Ben Howarth

1. Othane Pertzing (GK)
6. Marie-Alice Pelletier Rimbert
7. Paola Le Nindre
8. Yohanna Lhopital
9. Délia Baudena
10. Violette Blanquart
11. Sixtine Aelion
14. Maiwen Cadiou de Fresquet
15. Emma van der Zanden
16. Alice le Guerche
17. Alissia de Vries
18. Mazarine Proux
19. Mathilde Duffrène
20. Aliénor du Monceau
22. Eve Verzura
24. Lucie Ehrmann (GK)
25. Albane Garot
27. Delfina Gaspari (C)
28. Tessa-Margot Schubert
29. Léopoldine Coppin
India

Head Coach: (Netherlands) Sjoerd Marijne

6. Ishika Chaudhary
8. Nikki Pradhan
9. Bichu Devi Kharibam (GK)
11. Savita Punia (GK)
12. Shilpi Dabas
20. Lalremsiami Hmarzote
21. Deepika Soreng
23. Ishika
24. Jyoti Rumavat
25. Navneet Kaur
27. Sushila Chanu
29. Sunelita Toppo
30. Salima Tete (C)
32. Neha Goyal
35. Rutuja Pisal
37. Lalthantluangi
39. Sakshi Rana
47. Annu
55. Deepika Sehrawat
57. Sonam
Japan

Head Coach: Akira Takahashi

2. Miyu Suzuki
3. Ikumi Matsu
4. Hanami Saito
5. Nanako Tateiwa
6. Emi Nishikori
8. Shiho Kobayakawa
9. Mai Toriyama
10. Amiru Shimada (C)
11. Akari Nakagomi
12. Niko Maruyama
13. Hiroka Murayama
16. Saki Tanaka
17. Miyu Hasegawa
18. Yu Kudo (GK)
19. Maho Ueno
22. Ai Hiramatsu
23. Maho Segawa
25. Haruka Kawaguchi
26. Maiko Mikami
30. Urara Komagata (GK)
New Zealand

Head Coach: Philip Burrows

2. Olivia Shannon (C)
3. Ella Hyatt Brown
8. Hannah Cotter
9. Emelia Surridge
11. Casey Crowley
12. Tessa Reid
13. Josephine Murray
14. Amelia Calder
15. Grace O'Hanlon (GK)
16. Elizabeth Thompson
18. Anna Crowley
24. Paige Blake
25. Ruby Baker
26. Kaitlin Cotter
27. Holly Pearson
28. Hannah Gravenall
31. Riana Pho
34. Julia Gluyas (GK)
37. Emma Findlay
38. Brittany Wang
South Korea

Head Coach: Kim Yong-soo

1. Lee Seo-yeon (GK)
3. Kim Jeong-ihn
4. Hong Solbeotnara
5. Kim Jung-ju
6. Lee Yu-jin
7. Lee Yu-ri (C)
8. Kim Seo-na
9. Park Seung-ae
10. Kim Yu-jin
12. Choi Ji-yun
13. Mun Seung-hwa
17. Jin Su-yeon
18. Park Yeong-eun
20. An Su-jin
21. Han Nar-yeong
27. Kim Eun-ji (GK)
28. Park Seo-yeon
31. Park Mi-hyang
32. Son Hyer-young
35. Park Yoo-rim
United States

Head Coach: (Republic of Ireland) David Passmore

1. Abigail Tamer
2. Meredith Sholder (C)
3. Ashley Sessa
4. Sophia Gladieux
6. Megan Valzonis
8. Madeleine Zimmer
10. Reese D'Ariano
11. Katie Dixon
13. Ashley Hoffman
16. Emma DeBerdine (C)
17. Elizabeth Yeager
18. Claire Danahy
20. Leah Crouse
23. Caroline Ramsey
26. Lucy Adams
27. Ryleigh Heck
31. Kelsey Bing (GK)
32. Jennifer Rizzo (GK)
34. Lauren Wadas
36. Mia Schoenbeck
Uruguay

Head Coach: Rolando Rivero

3. Manuela Vilar (C)
6. Miranda Martínez (GK)
7. Martina Rago
10. Manuela Quiñones
12. Agustina Alles
13. Guadalupe Curutchague
14. Paula Pérez
16. Clementina Cristiani
18. Agustina Díaz
19. María Barreiro (C)
22. Lucía Olascoaga
23. Jacinta Curutchague
28. Sol Martínez
30. Milagros Seigal
32. María Bate (GK)
38. Justina Arregui
43. Lola Delafond
45. Delfina Burgos
46. Josefina Mari
51. Chiara Appennino

== Preliminary round ==
All times are local (UTC+12).

=== Pool A ===
Pos	Team	Pld	W	D	L	GF	GA	GD	Pts	Qualification
1	India	3	3	0	0	8	5	+3	9	Semi-finals
2	United States	3	2	0	1	13	5	+8	6	Semi-finals
3	Japan	3	1	0	2	4	7	−3	3	5–8th classification
4	Uruguay	3	0	0	3	5	13	−8	0	5–8th classification

Source: FIH
Rules for classification: 1) points; 2) matches won; 3) goal difference; 4) goals for; 5) head-to-head result; 6) field goals scored.

15 June 2026
10:45

India	3–2	United States
Sehrawat 17', 24'; Navneet 28'	Report	Sessa 4'; Zimmer 7'

Umpires:
Liu Xiaoying (CHN)
Lani Nichol (NZL)

15 June 2026
13:00

Japan	3–1	Uruguay
Toriyama 1'; Suzuki 30+'; Hasegawa 60'	Report	L. Curutchague 3'

Umpires:
Cassidy Gallagher (AUS)
Haroon Rashid (PAK)

16 June 2026
10:45

United States	7–2	Uruguay
Sessa 3'; Tamer 8', 17', 41', 47'; Yeager 12'; Heck 30'	Report	L. Curutchague 4'; Vilar 38'

Umpires:
Emi Yamada (JPN)
Meghan McLennan (CAN)

16 June 2026
13:00

Japan	1–2	India
Hiramitsu 35'	Report	Tete 33'; Hmarzote 49'

Umpires:
Amber Church (NZL)
Valerie Koh (SGP)

18 June 2026
10:45

India	3–2	Uruguay
Sehrawat 24', 56'; Soreng 43'	Report	Appennino 13'; Vilar 55'

Umpires:
Benjamin Peters (USA)
Emi Yamada (JPN)

18 June 2026
13:00

United States	4–0	Japan
Danahy 1'; Sessa 10', 32'; Zimmer 44'	Report

Umpires:
Amber Church (NZL)
Kristy Robertson (AUS)

=== Pool B ===
Pos	Team	Pld	W	D	L	GF	GA	GD	Pts	Qualification
1	New Zealand (H)	3	3	0	0	8	4	+4	9	Semi-finals
2	Chile	3	1	1	1	6	5	+1	4	Semi-finals
3	South Korea	3	0	2	1	4	6	−2	2	5–8th classification
4	France	3	0	1	2	2	5	−3	1	5–8th classification

Source: FIH
Rules for classification: 1) points; 2) matches won; 3) goal difference; 4) goals for; 5) head-to-head result; 6) field goals scored.
(H) Hosts

15 June 2026
15:45

Chile	2–0	France
Urroz 11'; Arrieta 57'	Report

Umpires:
Emi Yamada (JPN)
Valerie Koh (SGP)

15 June 2026
18:00

New Zealand	3–1	South Korea
K. Cotter 10'; Gravenall 40'; H. Cotter 41'	Report	Choi 31'

Umpires:
Kristy Robertson (AUS)
Meghan McLennan (CAN)

16 June 2026
15:45

South Korea	1–1	France
Lee Yu-r. 48'	Report	Van der Zanden 43'

Umpires:
Haroon Rashid (PAK)
Lani Nichol (NZL)

16 June 2026
18:00

Chile	2–3	New Zealand
Maldonado 4'; Avelli 40'	Report	Shannon 32'; Pearson 37'; Murray 56'

Umpires:
Benjamin Peters (USA)
Cassidy Gallagher (AUS)

18 June 2026
15:45

South Korea	2–2	Chile
Choi 16'; Lee Yu-r. 29'	Report	Arrieta 1', 14'

Umpires:
Haroon Rashid (PAK)
Meghan McLennan (CAN)

18 June 2026
18:00

New Zealand	2–1	France
K. Cotter 26'; Blake 57'	Report	Garot 33'

Umpires:
Liu Xiaoying (CHN)
Valerie Koh (SGP)

== Fifth to eighth place Classification ==
=== Bracket ===
Semi-finals
20 June
Japan (p.s.o.)	1 (3)
France	1 (1)
20 June
South Korea	2
Uruguay	1

Fifth place
21 June
Japan	0 (4)
South Korea (p.s.o.)	0 (5)
Seventh place
21 June
France	3
Uruguay	0

=== 5–8th place semi-finals ===
20 June 2026
11:00

Japan	1–1	France
Murayama 26'	Report	Blanquart 10'
Penalties
Hasegawa (penalty shoot-out missed); Kobayakawa (penalty shoot-out scored); Nakagomi (penalty shoot-out scored); Shimada (penalty shoot-out scored)	3–1	(penalty shoot-out missed) Schubert; (penalty shoot-out missed) Verzura; (penalty shoot-out scored) Garot; (penalty shoot-out missed) Lhopital

Umpires:
Kristy Robertson (AUS)
Valerie Koh (SGP)

20 June 2026
13:30

South Korea	2–1	Uruguay
Kim J. 18'; Park Seu. 55'	Report	Vilar 51'

Umpires:
Benjamin Peters (USA)
Haroon Rashid (PAK)

=== Seventh place game ===
21 June 2026
11:00

France	3–0	Uruguay
Van der Zanden 2'; Pelletier Rimbert 43'; Duffrène 55'	Report

Umpires:
Lani Nichol (NZL)
Emi Yamada (JPN)

=== Fifth place game ===
21 June 2026
13:30

Japan	0–0	South Korea
	Report
Penalties
Shimada (penalty shoot-out scored); Nakagomi (penalty shoot-out missed); Kobayakawa (penalty shoot-out scored); Hasegawa (penalty shoot-out missed); Suzuki (penalty shoot-out scored); Ueno (penalty shoot-out scored); Suzuki (penalty shoot-out missed)	4–5	(penalty shoot-out missed) Choi; (penalty shoot-out scored) Lee Yu-r. (penalty shoot-out missed) Park Seu. (penalty shoot-out scored) Lee Yu-r. (penalty shoot-out scored) An; (penalty shoot-out scored) Lee Yu-j. (penalty shoot-out scored) An

Umpires:
Meghan McLennan (CAN)
Liu Xiaoying (CHN)

== First to fourth place Classification ==
=== Bracket ===
Semi-finals
20 June
India	6
Chile	0
20 June
New Zealand (p.s.o.)	1 (4)
United States	1 (1)

Final
21 June
India	2
New Zealand	0
Third place
21 June
Chile	2
United States	3

=== Semi-finals ===
20 June 2026
16:00

India	6–0	Chile
Navneet 6', 13'; Sehrawat 14', 18'; Goyal 32'; Pisal 39'	Report

Umpires:
Amber Church (NZL)
Lani Nichol (NZL)

20 June 2026
18:30

New Zealand	1–1	United States
H. Cotter 35'	Report	Hoffman 31'
Penalties
Shannon (penalty shoot-out scored); H. Cotter (penalty shoot-out scored); Pho (penalty shoot-out scored); Murray (penalty shoot-out scored)	4–1	(penalty shoot-out missed) Adams; (penalty shoot-out missed) Heck; (penalty shoot-out scored) Sessa

Umpires:
Liu Xiaoying (CHN)
Cassidy Gallagher (AUS)

=== Third place game ===
21 June 2026
16:00

Chile	2–3	United States
Arrieta 26'; Maldonado 30'	Report	Sessa 12', 46'; Hoffman 34'

Umpires:
Amber Church (NZL)
Cassidy Gallagher (AUS)

=== Final ===
21 June 2026
18:30

India	2–0	New Zealand
Navneet 4'; Toppo 15'	Report

Umpires:
Kristy Robertson (AUS)
Benjamin Peters (USA)

== Statistics ==
=== Final standings ===
Pos	Team	Promotion or relegation
1st place, gold medalist(s)	India	Promoted to the 2026–27 Women's FIH Pro League
2nd place, silver medalist(s)	New Zealand	
3rd place, bronze medalist(s)	United States	
4	Chile	
5	South Korea	
6	Japan	
7	France	
8	Uruguay	

Source: FIH

=== Awards ===
The awards were announced on 20 June 2026.

Award	Player
Player of the tournament	(United States) Ashley Sessa
Goalkeeper of the tournament	(New Zealand) Grace O'Hanlon
Best young player	(New Zealand) Riana Pho

=== Goalscorers ===
There were 73 goals scored in 20 matches, for an average of 3.65 goals per match.

6 goals

- (India) Deepika Sehrawat
- (United States) Ashley Sessa

4 goals

- (India) Navneet Kaur
- (Chile) Fernanda Arrieta
- (United States) Abigail Tamer

3 goals

- (Uruguay) Manuela Vilar

2 goals

- (Chile) María Maldonado
- (New Zealand) Hannah Cotter
- (New Zealand) Kaitlin Cotter
- (France) Emma van der Zanden
- (South Korea) Choi Ji-yun
- (South Korea) Lee Yu-ri
- (United States) Ashley Hoffman
- (United States) Madeleine Zimmer
- (Uruguay) Lupe Curutchague

1 goal

- (Chile) Simone Avelli
- (Chile) Manuela Urroz
- (France) Violette Blanquart
- (France) Mathilde Duffrène
- (France) Albane Garot
- (France) Marie-Alice Pelletier Rimbert
- (India) Lalremsiami Hmarzote
- (India) Deepika Soreng
- (India) Neha Goyal
- (India) Rutuja Pisal
- (India) Salima Tete
- (India) Sunelita Toppo
- (Japan) Ai Hiramitsu
- (Japan) Miyu Hasegawa
- (Japan) Hiroka Murayama
- (Japan) Miyu Suzuki
- (Japan) Mai Toriyama
- (South Korea) Kim Jeong-ihn
- (South Korea) Park Seung-ae
- (New Zealand) Paige Blake
- (New Zealand) Hannah Gravenall
- (New Zealand) Josephine Murray
- (New Zealand) Holly Pearson
- (New Zealand) Olivia Shannon
- (United States) Claire Danahy
- (United States) Ryleigh Heck
- (United States) Elizabeth Yeager
- (Uruguay) Chiara Appennino

Source: FIH

== See also ==
- 2025–26 Men's FIH Hockey Nations Cup
