= Ajinder Kaur =

Indian field hockey player

Personal information
- Nationality: Indian
- Born: 14 June 1951 (age 75) Jalandhar, Punjab, India
- Education: Lyallpur Khalsa College

Sport
- Country: India
- Sport: Field hockey
- Coached by: Gurucharan Singh Bodhi

Ajinder Kaur (born 14 July 1951) is an Indian field hockey player and a former member of Indian women's hockey team. She hails from Punjab. She played for India and for Punjab and Sisters Hockey Eleven Club in the local tournaments. She plays as a defender. She received the Arjuna Award in 1974.

== Early life ==
Ajinder Kaur was born in Jalandhar. She did her schooling at the Government Girls Senior Secondary School, Nehru Garden, Jalandhar. She learnt the basics at the school under the guidance of coach Gurucharan Singh Bodhi. Later, she studied at Lyallpur Khalsa College for Women, in the same city and played for the college team from 1967 to 1970. She was also the captain of the college team. Later, in 1980, she married ENT surgeon Gurcharan Singh Saini. She is now based in Derby, England.

== Domestic career ==
- 1967 to 1970: Played for Lyallpur Khalsa College and local club Sisters Hockey Elevens.
- 1967 to 1978: Punjab State team in the Indian Nationals. In 1972 Punjab won the Senior National Tournament under her captaincy.
- 1970: Played for Guru Nanak Dev University team.

== International career ==
Ajinder Kaur is a strong defender and a specialist in penalty corners in the days where there were no drag flicks. She took India to the semifinals (fourth place) in the inaugural 1974 World Cup at Mandelieu, France, India's best performance in the World Cup. India was placed in with Belgium, Holland, Mexico, and Spain and defeated Holland in the pool match. Holland eventually won the World Cup. However, India lost the bronze medal match against Argentina.

- She played for India from 1967 to 1978:
- 6 September 1967: Debut for Senior India against Australia at New Delhi.
- 24 September 1978: She played her last international match against Spain in Madrid, Spain.
- 1968: She was part of the Indian team that played the 1st Asian Women Hockey Championship in New Delhi.
- 1970: Silver Jubilee Tournament in Japan.
- 1971: Part of Indian team that played Hockey World Championship at New Zealand.
- 1974: She was selected for the Asia XI.
- 1975: Captained Indian team which won the Begum Rasul Trophy in Chennai. For a long time this is the only international tournament which India won.
- 1975: She also captained the Indian team at the World Championship in Edinburgh.
- 1978: Represented India at the World Cup in Madrid, Spain.

== Coach, teaching career ==
1975 to 1981: She worked as a coach in the Punjab Education department.

December 1990 to December 2003: She taught Physical Education as a lecturer at Govt Model Senior Secondary School, Chandigarh.

== Awards ==
- Arjuna Award
- The Maharaja Ranjit Singh award by Government of Punjab;
- Chandigarh Journalist Association: Best Sports women of the year 1975
- Delhi Journalists Association: Best Sports women of the year 1976
- Jabalpur Journalist Association: Best Sports women of the year 1978
