= Japan women's national field hockey team =

Japan
- Nickname(s): Sakura 桜 (kanji), 櫻 (old kanji), さくら (hiragana), サクラ (katakana) The Cherry Blossoms
- Association: Japan Hockey Association
- Confederation: AHF (Asia)
- Head Coach: Akira Takahashi
- Assistant coach(es): Genki Mitani; Yuri Nagai
- Manager: Mina Kose
- Captain: Yu Kudo
Home	Away

FIH ranking
- Current: 11 (3 October 2026)

Olympic Games
- Appearances: 6 (first in 2004)
- Best result: 8th (2004)

World Cup
- Appearances: 10 (first in 1978)
- Best result: 5th (2006)

Asian Games
- Appearances: 12 (first in 1982)
- Best result: 1st (2018)

Asia Cup
- Appearances: 11 (first in 1985)
- Best result: 1st (2007, 2013, 2022)
Medal record
Event	1st	2nd	3rd
Asian Games	1	3	4
Asia Cup	3	3	0
Asian Champions Trophy	2	2	3
Nations Cup	0	0	1
Total	6	8	8
Asian Games
Gold medal – first place	2018 Jakarta	Team
Silver medal – second place	1986 Seoul	Team
Silver medal – second place	1994 Hiroshima	Team
Silver medal – second place	2006 Doha	Team
Bronze medal – third place	1990 Beijing	Team
Bronze medal – third place	2002 Busan	Team
Bronze medal – third place	2010 Guangzhou	Team
Bronze medal – third place	2026 Aichi-Nagoya	Team
Asia Cup
Gold medal – first place	2007 Hong Kong	
Gold medal – first place	2013 Kuala Lumpur	
Gold medal – first place	2022 Muscat	
Silver medal – second place	1985 Seoul	
Silver medal – second place	1989 Hong Kong	
Silver medal – second place	2004 New Delhi	
Bronze medal – third place	2025 Hangzhou	
Asian Champions Trophy
Gold medal – first place	2013 Kakamigahara	
Gold medal – first place	2021 Donghae	
Silver medal – second place	2010 Busan	
Silver medal – second place	2023 Ranchi	
Bronze medal – third place	2011 Ordos	
Bronze medal – third place	2016 Singapore	
Bronze medal – third place	2024 Rajgir	

The Japan women's national field hockey team represents Japan in the international field hockey competitions.

== Tournament history ==
=== Summer Olympics ===
- 2004 – 8th place
- 2008 – 10th place
- 2012 – 9th place
- 2016 – 10th place
- 2020 – 11th place
- 2024 – 10th place

=== World Cup ===
- 1978 – 6th place
- 1981 – 7th place
- 1990 – 11th place
- 2002 – 10th place
- 2006 – 5th place
- 2010 – 11th place
- 2014 – 10th place
- 2018 – 13th place
- 2022 – 11th place
- 2026 – 11th place

=== Asian Games ===
- 1982 – 4th place
- 1986 – (silver)
- 1990 – (bronze)
- 1994 – (silver)
- 1998 – 4th place
- 2002 – (bronze)
- 2006 – (silver)
- 2010 – (bronze)
- 2014 – 4th place
- 2018 – (gold)
- 2022 – 4th place
- 2026 – (bronze)

=== Asia Cup ===
- 1985 – (silver)
- 1989 – (silver)
- 1993 – 4th place
- 1999 – 4th place
- 2004 – (silver)
- 2007 – (gold)
- 2009 – 4th place
- 2013 – (gold)
- 2017 – 4th place
- 2022 – (gold)
- 2025 – (bronze)

=== Asian Champions Trophy ===
- 2010 – (silver)
- 2011 – (bronze)
- 2013 – (gold)
- 2016 – (bronze)
- 2018 – 5th place
- 2021 – (gold)
- 2023 – (silver)
- 2024 – (bronze)
- 2026 – Qualified

=== World League ===
- 2012–13 – 9th place
- 2014–15 – 12th place
- 2016–17 – 11th place

=== Hockey Nations Cup ===
- 2022 – (bronze)
- 2023–24 – 5th place
- 2024–25 – 6th place
- 2025–26 – 6th place

=== Champions Trophy ===
- 2007 – 5th place
- 2008 – 6th place
- 2012 – 5th place
- 2014 – 8th place
- 2018 – 6th place

=== Champions Challenge ===
- 2003 – (bronze)
- 2005 – (bronze)
- 2009 – (bronze)
- 2011 – (gold)

== Current squad ==
The following players are named for the 2026 Women's Asian Champions Trophy

Head Coach: (Japan) Akira Takahashi

4. Hanami Saito
7. Mayuri Horikawa
12. Nico Maruyama
13. Hiroka Murayama
18. Yu Kudo (C, GK)
19. Maho Ueno
20. Mei Matsunami
21. Rui Takashima
22. Ani Hiramitsu
24. Akane Wada
25. Haruka Kawaguchi
27. Nanami Kaneko
28. Suzuna Yamamoto
29. Kokona Tanaka
31. Kazuha Kageyama
33. Risa Sasaki
34. Hana Morikawa
35. Aya Kawamura (GK)

== Results and fixtures ==
The following is a list of match results in the last 12 months, as well as any future matches that have been scheduled.

Win Draw Loss Fixture

=== 2026 ===
Summer Hockey Series

21 January 2026 Match 1	Japan	4–2	New Zealand A	Dunedin, New Zealand
16:30	Takashima 6'; S. Tanaka 33'; Murayama 37'; Hasegawa 49'	Report	Willocks 13'; Baker 52'	Stadium: Alexander McMillan Hockey Centre

22 January 2026 Match 2	United States	4–0	Japan	Dunedin, New Zealand
16:30	Hoffman 13'; Sholder 40'; Heck 43'; Yeager 49'	Report		Stadium: Alexander McMillan Hockey Centre

24 January 2026 Match 3	New Zealand	1–0	Japan	Dunedin, New Zealand
16:00	Gravenall 53'	Report		Stadium: Alexander McMillan Hockey Centre

25 January 2026 Third place Match	Japan	0–1	New Zealand A	Dunedin, New Zealand
14:00		Report	Bond 25'	Stadium: Alexander McMillan Hockey Centre

==== 2026 Women's FIH Hockey World Cup Qualifiers ====
2 March 2026 Pool B	Japan	4–0	Canada	Santiago, Chile
13:00	Nakagomi 5'; Hasegawa 37'; S. Tanaka 39'; Mikami 53'	Report		Stadium: Estadio Nacional del Hockey Césped Claudia Schüler

3 March 2026 Pool B	Ireland	2–1	Japan	Santiago, Chile
15:45	N. Carey 18'; Perdue 29'	Report	Toriyama 55'	Stadium: Estadio National del Hockey Césped Claudia Schüler

5 March 2026 Pool B	Japan	4–0	Malaysia	Santiago, Chile
13:00	Kobayakawa 39', 45'; Murayama 48'; Nakagomi 55'	Report		Stadium: Estadio Nacional del Hockey Césped Claudia Schüler

7 March 2026 Semi-final	Chile	1–1 (2–0 p)	Japan	Santiago, Chile
20:15	Ananías 59'	Report	Saito 14'	Stadium: Estadio Nacional del Hockey Césped Claudia Schüler
	Penalties
	Muñoz (penalty shoot-out missed); Ananías (penalty shoot-out scored); Valdivia (penalty shoot-out missed); Urroz (penalty shoot-out scored)		(penalty shoot-out missed) Kobayakawa; (penalty shoot-out missed) Nakagomi; (penalty shoot-out missed) Tanaka; (penalty shoot-out missed) Hasegawa

8 March 2026 3/4 Classification	Japan	0–0 (1–3 p)	Ireland	Santiago, Chile
18:00		Report		Stadium: Estadio Nacional del Hockey Césped Claudia Schüler
	Penalties
	Kobayakawa (penalty shoot-out scored); Hasegawa (penalty shoot-out missed); Toriyama (penalty shoot-out missed); Nakagomi (penalty shoot-out missed)		(penalty shoot-out scored) Hawkshaw; (penalty shoot-out scored) McLoughlin; (penalty shoot-out missed) Kealy; (penalty shoot-out scored) McMaster

==== Test matches ====
11 April 2026 Test 1	Japan	1–0	South Korea	Tokyo, Japan
15:30	Murayama 43'	Report		Stadium: Oi Hockey Stadium

12 April 2026 Test 2	Japan	1–1	South Korea	Tokyo, Japan
13:00	Shimada 39'	Report	Choi 21'	Stadium: Oi Hockey Stadium

==== 2026 FIH Nations Cup ====
15 June Pool A	Japan	3–1	Uruguay	Auckland, New Zealand
13:00	Toriyama 1'; Suzuki 30+'; Hasegawa 60'	Report	Curutchague 3'	Stadium: National Hockey Centre

16 June Pool A	Japan	1–2	India	Auckland, New Zealand
13:00	Hiramitsu 35'	Report	Salima 33'; Lalremsiami 49'	Stadium: National Hockey Centre

18 June Pool A	United States	4–0	Japan	Auckland, New Zealand
13:00	Danahy 1'; Sessa 10', 32'; Zimmer 44'	Report		Stadium: National Hockey Centre

20 June 5/8 Classification	Japan	1–1 (3–1 p)	France	Auckland, New Zealand
11:00	Murayama 26'	Report	Blanquart 10'	Stadium: National Hockey Centre
	Penalties
	Hasegawa (penalty shoot-out missed); Kobayakawa (penalty shoot-out scored); Nakagomi (penalty shoot-out scored); Shimada (penalty shoot-out scored)		(penalty shoot-out missed) Schubert; (penalty shoot-out missed) Verzura; (penalty shoot-out scored) Garot; (penalty shoot-out missed) Lhopital

21 June 5/6 Classification	Japan	0–0 (4–5 p)	South Korea	Auckland, New Zealand
13:30		Report		Stadium: National Hockey Centre
	Penalties
	Shimada (penalty shoot-out scored); Nakagomi (penalty shoot-out missed); Kobayakawa (penalty shoot-out scored); Hasegawa (penalty shoot-out missed); Suzuki (penalty shoot-out scored); Ueno (penalty shoot-out scored); Suzuki (penalty shoot-out missed)		(penalty shoot-out missed) Choi; (penalty shoot-out scored) Yu-ri; (penalty shoot-out missed) Park; (penalty shoot-out scored) Yu-ri; (penalty shoot-out scored) An; (penalty shoot-out scored) Yu-jin; (penalty shoot-out scored) An

==== 2026 Women's FIH Hockey World Cup ====
15 August 2026 Pool A	Australia	2–0	Japan	Amsterdam, Netherlands
10:00	Colwill 27', 51'	Report		Stadium: Wagener Stadium

17 August 2026 Pool A	Chile	0–3	Japan	Amsterdam, Netherlands
09:30		Report	Hasegawa 8'; Murayama 17'; Ueno 22'	Stadium: Wagener Stadium

19 August 2026 Pool A	Netherlands	9–0	Japan	Amsterdam, Netherlands
18:00	Y. Jansen 5', 23', 25', 51'; Veen 15', 34'; Albers 21', 53'; Matla 46'	Report		Stadium: Wagener Stadium

21 August 2026 Pool G	Japan	1–1	South Africa	Amsterdam, Netherlands
09:30	Murayama 52'	Report	Mokoena 51'	Stadium: Wagener Stadium

23 August 2026 Pool G	Japan	2–3	England	Amsterdam, Netherlands
13:00	Kobayakawa 16'; Nishikori 38'	Report	Atkinson 2'; Hunt 8'; Balsdon 27'	Stadium: Wagener Stadium

27 August 2026 11th place match	Japan	2–1	Scotland	Amsterdam, Netherlands
12:30	Suzuki 11'; Nakagomi 50'	Report	Mackenzie 58'	Stadium: Wagener Stadium

==== 2026 Asian Games ====
18 September 2026 Pool B	Japan	7–0	Indonesia	Kakamigahara, Japan
17:00	Kobayakawa 26'; Murayama 32'; Shimada 40'; Ueno 45'; Saito 47'; Suzuki 50', 57'	Report		Stadium: Gifu Prefectural Green Stadium

21 September 2026 Pool B	Japan	5–0	Singapore	Kakamigahara, Japan
17:00	Murayama 23'; Toriyama 28'; Kobayakawa 29'; Hasegawa 38'; Saito 44'	Report		Stadium: Gifu Prefectural Green Stadium

23 September 2026 Pool B	Uzbekistan	1–7	Japan	Kakamigahara, Japan
17:00	Yubko 8'	Report	Kobayakawa 1', 38', 50'; Toriyama 15', 58'; Kawaguchi 20'; Suzuki 27'	Stadium: Gifu Prefectural Green Stadium

25 September 2026 Pool B	Japan	1–3	India	Kakamigahara, Japan
11:00	Kobayakawa 46'	Report	Lalremsiami 5'; Ishika 30'; Navneet 36'	Stadium: Gifu Prefectural Green Stadium

27 September 2026 Pool B	Thailand	0–3	Japan	Kakamigahara, Japan
17:00		Report	Nakagomi 10', 23'; Saito 54'	Stadium: Gifu Prefectural Green Stadium

30 September 2026 Semi-final	China	0–0 (4–2 p)	Japan	Kakamigahara, Japan
16:30		Report		Stadium: Gifu Prefectural Green Stadium
	Penalties
	Li (penalty shoot-out missed); Liu (penalty shoot-out scored); Ma (penalty shoot-out scored); Dan (penalty shoot-out scored); He (penalty shoot-out scored)		(penalty shoot-out scored) Murayama; (penalty shoot-out missed) Kobayakawa; (penalty shoot-out missed) Nakagomi; (penalty shoot-out scored) Hasegawa

2 October 2026 Bronze medal match	Japan	0–0 (4–2 p)	South Korea	Kakamigahara, Japan
16:30		Report		Stadium: Gifu Prefectural Green Stadium
	Penalties
	Shimada (penalty shoot-out scored); Murayama (penalty shoot-out scored); Hasegawa (penalty shoot-out scored); Kobayakawa (penalty shoot-out scored)		(penalty shoot-out missed) Jung; (penalty shoot-out missed) Park Seu. (penalty shoot-out scored) An; (penalty shoot-out scored) Lee Yu.

==== 2026 Asian Champions Trophy ====
19 November 2026 Round-robin	Japan	1–0	South Korea	Bhopal, India
14:20	Saito 59'	Report		Stadium: Barkheda Nathu International Sports Complex

21 November 2026 Round-robin	Thailand	0–3	Japan	Bhopal, India
16:45		Report	Sasaki 9', 23'; Yamamoto 41'	Stadium: Barkheda Nathu International Sports Complex

22 November 2026 Round-robin	Japan	3–1	China	Bhopal, India
12:45	Yamamoto 19'; Kaneko 35'; Maruyama 60'	Report	Cai 45'	Stadium: Barkheda Nathu International Sports Complex

24 November 2026 Round-robin	Malaysia	v	Japan	Bhopal, India
16:45				Stadium: Barkheda Nathu International Sports Complex

25 November 2026 Round-robin	Japan	v	India	Bhopal, India
19:00				Stadium: Barkheda Nathu International Sports Complex

== See also ==
- Japan men's national field hockey team
- Japan women's national under-21 field hockey team
