= India women's national field hockey team =

Indian women's hockey team

India
- Nickname(s): Women in Blue
- Association: Hockey India; (2008–present); Indian Hockey Federation; (1925–2008)
- Confederation: Asian Hockey Federation
- Head Coach: Sjoerd Marijne
- Assistant coach(es): Taeke Taekema; Matías Vila
- Manager: Raina Yadav
- Captain: Salima Tete
- Most caps: Savita Punia (326)
- Top scorer: Rani Rampal (120)
Home	Away

FIH ranking
- Current: 7 ▲1 (3 October 2026)
- Highest: 5 (2025)

First international
- Scotland 6–1 India (Folkestone, England; 30 September 1953) (Unofficial)

Last international
- Thailand 0–7 India (Bhopal, India; 22 November 2026)

Biggest win
- India 24–0 Nepal (Guwahati, India; 7 February 2016)

Biggest defeat
- England 18–0 India (Sydney, Australia; 23 May 1956) (Unofficial)

Olympic Games
- Appearances: 3 (first in 1980)
- Best result: 4th (1980, 2020)

World Cup
- Appearances: 9 (first in 1974)
- Best result: 4th (1974)

Asian Games
- Appearances: 12 (first in 1982)
- Best result: Champions (1982, 2026)

Asia Cup
- Appearances: 10 (first in 1989)
- Best result: (gold) Champions (2004, 2017)
Medal record
Event	1st	2nd	3rd
Asian Games	2	2	4
Asia Cup	2	3	3
Asian Champions Trophy	3	2	1
Pro League	0	0	1
Nations Cup	2	0	0
Commonwealth Games	1	1	1
Total	10	8	10
Asian Games
Gold medal – first place	1982 New Delhi	Team
Gold medal – first place	2026 Aichi-Nagoya	Team
Silver medal – second place	1998 Bangkok	Team
Silver medal – second place	2018 Jakarta	Team
Bronze medal – third place	1986 Seoul	Team
Bronze medal – third place	2006 Doha	Team
Bronze medal – third place	2014 Incheon	Team
Bronze medal – third place	2022 Hangzhou	Team
Asia Cup
Gold medal – first place	2004 New Delhi	
Gold medal – first place	2017 Kakamigahara	
Silver medal – second place	1999 New Delhi	
Silver medal – second place	2009 Bangkok	
Silver medal – second place	2025 Hangzhou	
Bronze medal – third place	1993 Hiroshima	
Bronze medal – third place	2013 Kuala Lumpur	
Bronze medal – third place	2022 Muscat	
Asian Champions Trophy
Gold medal – first place	2016 Singapore	
Gold medal – first place	2023 Ranchi	
Gold medal – first place	2024 Rajgir	
Silver medal – second place	2018 Donghae	
Silver medal – second place	2013 Kakamigahara	
Bronze medal – third place	2010 Busan	
Pro League
Bronze medal – third place	2021–22 Rotterdam	
Nations Cup
Gold medal – first place	2022 Valencia	
Gold medal – first place	2025–26 Auckland	
Commonwealth Games
Gold medal – first place	2002 Manchester	Team
Silver medal – second place	2006 Melbourne	Team
Bronze medal – third place	2022 Birmingham	Team

The Indian women's national field hockey team represents India in international field hockey, and is governed by Hockey India. They are one of the top 10 teams in the world and the second best team in Asia as per the rankings. They are the reigning Asian Games Champions.

They have won the FIH Nations Cup twice and the gold at the 2002 Commonwealth Games. They have won gold at the 1982 and 2026 Asian Games. They have also won the Asia Cup twice, in 2004 and 2017, and the Asian Champions Trophy thrice, in 2016, 2023 and 2024. They have also won the FIH Women's World Hockey Series 2018–19 edition.

== History ==
The team's breakthrough performance came at the Women's Hockey World Cup at Mandelieu in 1974, where they finished fourth. Their best performance in the Olympic Games was at the 1980 Moscow where they ended fourth when a women's event was held for the first time in the Olympic history. India beat Poland 4–0 in that tournament, which is their biggest margin of win in the Olympics. The team also won the Gold medal at the inaugural 1982 Asian Games held in New Delhi, defeating South Korea in the final. India also recorded their biggest win in the Asian Games by winning Hong Kong 22–0 in that Games. Captain Suraj Lata Devi led the team to the Gold for three consecutive years at different events- during the 2002 Commonwealth Games, the 2003 Afro-Asian Games, and the 2004 Women's Hockey Asia Cup. Team members were referred to as the assi (Jasjeet) jaisi koi nahi or the Golden Girls of Hockey, after the 2004 win. The 2002 Commonwealth Games Squad, led by Captain Suraj Lata Devi, competed in the 2002 Commonwealth Games. The team entered the finals after defeating New Zealand and placed first, winning the gold after they beat England.

This event served as the inspiration for the 2007 Bollywood film about women's field hockey, Chak De! India starring Shah Rukh Khan (after screenwriter Jaideep Sahni read a short article about it). Sahni began to model the character of Kabir Khan on hockey coach Maharaj Krishan Kaushik. After hearing the storyline, Kaushik suggested that Sahni meet hockey player Mir Ranjan Negi who faced accusations of throwing the match against Pakistan during the 1982 Asian Games. Sahni has stated that he was unaware of Negi's tribulations while writing the script and that the resemblance with Negi's life was entirely coincidental. Negi affirmed this point stating that he didn't "want to hog the limelight. This movie is not a documentary of Mir Ranjan Negi's life. It is in fact the story of a team that becomes a winning lot from a bunch of hopeless girls". In response to the fact that the media equated Kabir Khan with Negi, Sahni said, "Our script was written a year and a half back. It is very unfortunate that something, which is about women athletes, has just started becoming about Negi." The team earned a third place finish at the 2013 Women's Hockey Asia Cup at Kuala Lumpur defeating China in the shootout.

At the 2014 Commonwealth Games, they finished in 5th place but at 2014 Asian Games, Incheon stunned Japan 2–1 in a tight match to clinch their third bronze medal at the Asian Games. During the summer of 2015, the team hosted the Round 2 of the 2014–15 Women's FIH Hockey World League and finished on top to qualify for the next stage. At the World League Semi-finals held in Antwerp the team finished in the fifth place beating higher ranked Japan in classification match. The Indian team qualified for the 2016 Rio Olympics for the first time since the 1980 Olympics. They were eliminated in the group stage where they finished 6th.

India at the 2020 Tokyo Olympics for the first time ever, reached the semi-final in the Olympics after beating the 3 times Olympic Champions Australia 1–0 in the quarter-final, but failed to bag any medal after they lost to Argentina in the semi-final and then to Great Britain in the bronze medal match. Vandana Katariya scored India's first and only hat-trick in Olympics, that helped the team to win South Africa 4–3 and enter the knockout stage. Following their performance at the Olympics, the team went to win bronze medals at the 2022 Asia Cup and the Commonwealth Games and a third-place finish in the 2021–22 Pro League. In 2022 India won the first ever FIH Women's Nations Cup. However, they failed to qualify for the Paris Olympics losing to Japan in the bronze medal match at the Olympic Qualifier in Ranchi on 19 January 2024. India won the 2026 FIH Nations Cup defeating New Zealand and returned to the 2026–27 FIH Pro League. India recorded its biggest win in the World Cup by defeating South Africa 6–1 in the 2026 World Cup. India secured the 5th place by beating Germany which marked their best finish in the World Cup after the 4th place in 1974 edition. India made their third biggest win in the Asian Games after winning Uzbekistan by 19–0 at the 2026 edition, where Deepika Sehrawat's 8 goals set the record of most goals in a match by a woman player at the Games. She broke her own record by scoring 9 in a match against Thailand. India clinched their second gold after 44 years, beating China and sealed their place in the 2028 Olympics.

== Gallery ==
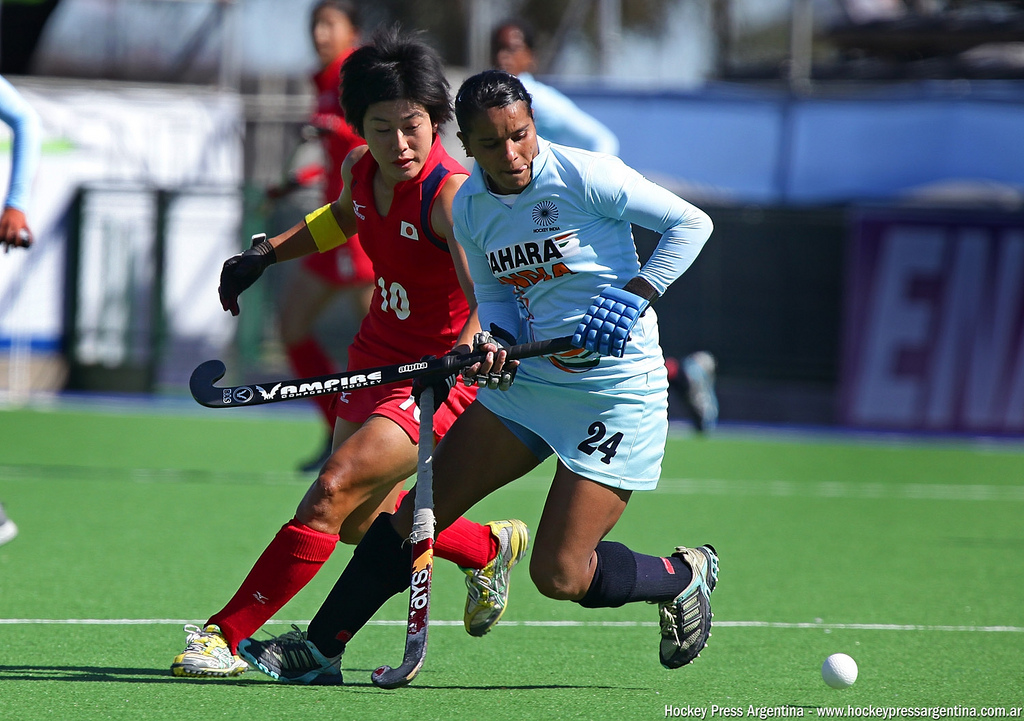
India playing against Japan at 2010 World Cup

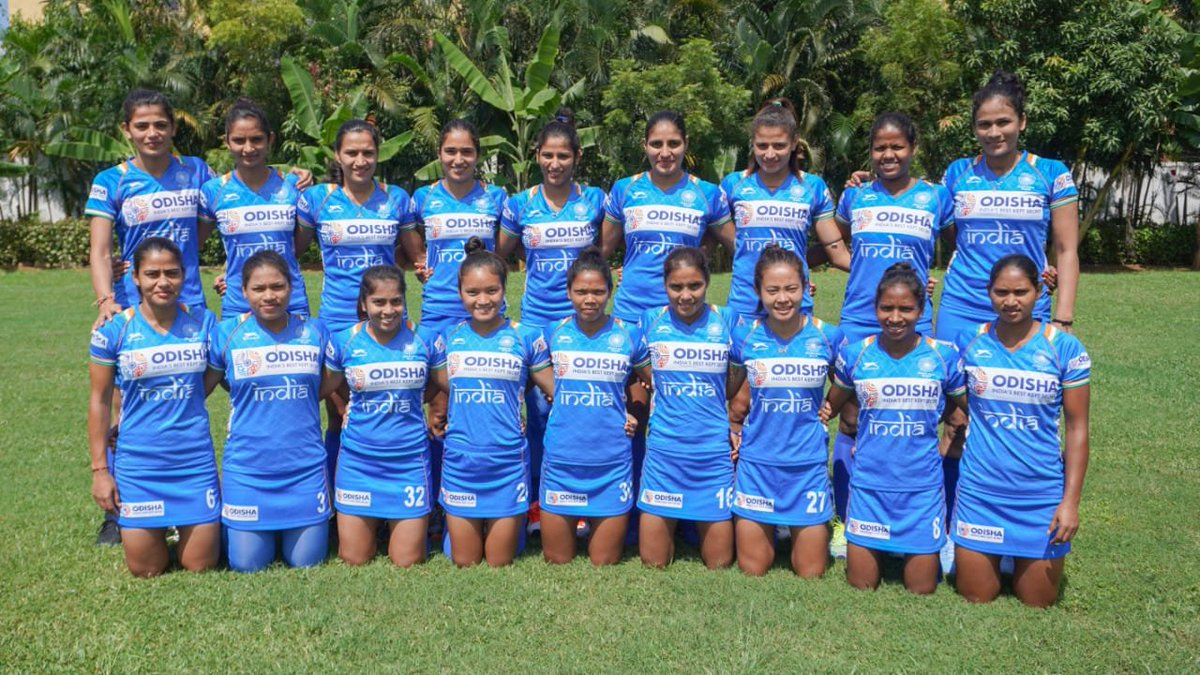
The India women's national field hockey team in 2019

== Performance record ==
Champions Runners-up Third place Fourth place Did not qualify Tournament played fully or partially on home soil

=== Major tournaments ===
==== Summer Olympics ====
Summer Olympics
Year	Host	Position	Pld	W	D	L	GF	GA
1980	Moscow, Soviet Union	4th	5	2	1	2	9	6
1984	Los Angeles, United States	Did not participate						
1988	Seoul, South Korea	Did not participate						
1992	Barcelona, Spain	Did not participate						
1996	Atlanta, United States	Did not participate						
2000	Sydney, Australia	Did not qualify						
2004	Athens, Greece	Did not qualify						
2008	Beijing, China	Did not qualify						
2012	(United Kingdom) London, Great Britain	Did not qualify						
2016	Rio de Janeiro, Brazil	12th	5	0	1	4	3	19
2020	Tokyo, Japan	4th	8	3	0	5	12	20
2024	Paris, France	Did not qualify						
2028	Los Angeles, United States	Qualified						
	Total	4th place	18	5	2	11	24	45

==== Summer Olympics Qualifiers ====
Summer Olympics Qualifiers
Year	Host	Position	Result	Pld	W	D	L	GF	GA
2000	Milton Keynes, England	10th	Did not qualify for 2000 Summer Olympics	5	0	0	5	3	12
2008	Kazan, Russia	4th	Did not qualify for 2008 Summer Olympics	6	2	0	4	14	12
2012	Delhi, India	Runners-up	Did not qualify for 2012 Summer Olympics	6	3	1	2	12	10
2019	Bhubaneswar, India	–	Qualified for 2020 Summer Olympics	2	1	0	1	6	5
2024	Ranchi, India	4th	Did not qualify for 2024 Summer Olympics	5	2	1	2	10	6
	Total		Runners-up	24	8	2	14	45	45

==== World Cup ====
World Cup
Year	Host	Position	Pld	W	D	L	GF	GA
1974	Mandelieu, France	4th	6	3	0	3	8	6
1976	West Berlin, West Germany	Did not participate						
1978	Madrid, Spain	7th	6	2	1	3	5	10
1981	Buenos Aires, Argentina	Did not participate						
1983	Kuala Lumpur, Malaysia	11th	7	1	1	5	6	10
1986	Amstelveen, Netherlands	Did not qualify						
1990	Sydney, Australia	Did not qualify						
1994	(Republic of Ireland) Dublin, Ireland	Did not qualify						
1998	Utrecht, Netherlands	12th	7	0	0	7	9	23
2002	Perth, Australia	Did not qualify						
2006	Madrid, Spain	11th	7	1	1	5	9	15
2010	Rosario, Argentina	9th	6	2	0	4	11	23
2014	The Hague, Netherlands	Did not qualify						
2018	London, England	8th	5	1	3	1	5	3
2022	Amstelveen, Netherlands and Valencia, Spain	9th	6	1	3	2	9	8
2026	Wavre, Belgium and Amstelveen, Netherlands	5th	6	2	3	1	11	6
	Total	4th place	56	13	12	31	73	104

==== World Cup Qualifiers ====
World Cup Qualifiers
Year	Host	Position	Result	Pld	W	D	L	GF	GA
1985	Buenos Aires, Argentina	5th	Did not qualify for 1986 World Cup	5	3	1	1	19	3
1989	Delhi, India	8th	Did not qualify for 1990 World Cup	7	2	0	5	17	14
1993	(United States) Philadelphia, USA	6th	Did not qualify for 1994 World Cup	7	3	0	4	6	7
2001	Abbeville and Amiens, France	7th	Qualified for Qualifying Playoff	7	3	1	3	15	7
2002	Cannock, England	–	Did not qualify for 2002 World Cup	3	0	2	1	3	5
2026	Hyderabad, India	Runners-up	Qualified for 2026 World Cup	5	3	1	1	11	5
	Total		2nd	34	14	5	15	71	41

==== Asian Games ====
Asian Games
Year	Host	Position	Pld	W	D	L	GF	GA
1982	New Delhi, India	1st place, gold medalist(s)	5	5	0	0	37	1
1986	Seoul, South Korea	3rd place, bronze medalist(s)	5	3	1	1	17	5
1990	Beijing, China	4th	5	2	0	3	8	10
1994	Hiroshima, Japan	4th	5	1	2	2	9	6
1998	Bangkok, Thailand	2nd place, silver medalist(s)	7	4	1	2	25	11
2002	Busan, South Korea	4th	4	0	0	4	2	12
2006	Doha, Qatar	3rd place, bronze medalist(s)	7	4	0	3	22	10
2010	Guangzhou, China	4th	7	3	0	4	24	7
2014	Incheon, South Korea	3rd place, bronze medalist(s)	5	3	0	2	13	7
2018	Jakarta, Indonesia	2nd place, silver medalist(s)	6	5	0	1	40	3
2022	Hangzhou, China	3rd place, bronze medalist(s)	6	4	1	1	35	6
2026	Aichi–Nagoya, Japan	1st place, gold medalist(s)	7	7	0	0	69	3
	Total	2 titles	69	41	5	23	301	81

==== Asia Cup ====
Asia Cup
Year	Host	Position	Pld	W	D	L	GF	GA
1985	Seoul, South Korea	Did not participate						
1989	Hong Kong	4th	4	1	0	3	4	11
1993	Hiroshima, Japan	3rd place, bronze medalist(s)	4	2	1	1	8	4
1999	New Delhi, India	2nd place, silver medalist(s)	6	3	2	1	24	7
2004	New Delhi, India	1st place, gold medalist(s)	5	4	1	0	19	3
2007	Hong Kong	4th	6	3	0	3	44	13
2009	Bangkok, Thailand	2nd place, silver medalist(s)	6	3	2	1	36	9
2013	Kuala Lumpur, Malaysia	3rd place, bronze medalist(s)	5	2	1	2	18	5
2017	Kakamigahara, Gifu, Japan	1st place, gold medalist(s)	6	5	1	0	28	5
2022	Muscat, Oman	3rd place, bronze medalist(s)	5	3	0	2	22	6
2025	Hangzhou, China	2nd place, silver medalist(s)	7	3	2	2	32	13
	Total	2 titles	54	29	10	15	235	76

==== Asian Champions Trophy ====
Asian Champions Trophy
Year	Host	Position	Pld	W	D	L	GF	GA
2010	Busan, South Korea	3rd place, bronze medalist(s)	4	1	0	3	8	15
2011	Ordos, China	4th	4	0	0	4	3	16
2013	Kakamigahara, Japan	2nd place, silver medalist(s)	4	2	0	2	10	6
2016	Singapore	1st place, gold medalist(s)	5	3	1	1	10	7
2018	Donghae City, South Korea	2nd place, silver medalist(s)	5	3	1	1	11	6
2021	Donghae City, South Korea	Withdrew	1	1	0	0	13	0
2023	Ranchi, India	1st place, gold medalist(s)	7	7	0	0	27	3
2024	Rajgir, India	1st place, gold medalist(s)	7	7	0	0	29	2
2026	Bhopal, India	Qualified						
	Total	3 titles	37	24	2	11	111	55

==== Pro League ====
Pro League
Year	Host	Position	Pld	W	D	L	GF	GA
2021–22	N/A	3rd place, bronze medalist(s)	14	6	4	4	33	26
2022–23	N/A	Replaced (Note: Australia and New Zealand were unable to participate in the previous edition due to the COVID-19 pandemic and were replaced by India and Spain. In the following edition, Australia and New Zealand returned, replacing India and Spain.)						
2023–24	N/A	8th	16	2	1	13	16	38
2024–25	N/A	9th	16	2	3	11	22	43
2025–26	N/A	Did not qualify						
2026–27	N/A	Qualified						
Total		Third place	46	10	8	28	71	107

==== Nations Cup ====
Nations Cup
Year	Final Host	Position	Pld	W	D	L	GF	GA
2022	Valencia, Spain	1st place, gold medalist(s)	5	4	1	0	9	3
2025–26	Auckland, New Zealand	1st place, gold medalist(s)	5	5	0	0	16	5
	Total	2 titles	10	9	1	0	25	8

==== Commonwealth Games ====
Commonwealth Games
Year	Host	Position	Pld	W	D	L	GF	GA
1998	Kuala Lumpur, Malaysia	4th	7	3	1	3	19	13
2002	Manchester, England	1st place, gold medalist(s)	6	4	1	1	12	10
2006	Melbourne, Australia	2nd place, silver medalist(s)	6	3	1	2	19	8
2010	New Delhi, India	5th	5	3	1	1	15	4
2014	Glasgow, Scotland	5th	5	3	0	2	22	9
2018	Gold Coast, Queensland, Australia	4th	6	3	0	3	9	12
2022	Birmingham, England	3rd place, bronze medalist(s)	6	3	2	1	14	8
	Total	1 title	41	22	6	13	110	64

=== Other tournaments ===
==== South Asian Games ====
South Asian Games
Year	Host	Position	Pld	W	D	L	GF	GA
2016	Guwahati, India	1st place, gold medalist(s)	3	3	0	0	46	1
	Total	1 title	3	3	0	0	46	1

=== Defunct competitions ===
==== World League ====
Hockey World League
Year	Host	Round	Position	Pld	W	D	L	GF	GA
2012–13
2012–13	New Delhi, India	Round 2	1st	5	4	1	0	24	2
2012–13	Rotterdam, Netherlands	Semifinals	7th	6	1	1	4	5	28
2014–15
2014–15	New Delhi, India	Round 2	1st	6	6	0	0	39	1
2014–15	Antwerp, Belgium	Semifinals	5th	7	3	0	4	7	19
2016–17
2016–17	West Vancouver, Canada	Round2	1st	4	3	1	0	8	3
2016–17	Johannesburg, South Africa	Semifinals	8th	7	1	1	5	4	15
	Total			35	18	4	13	87	68

==== Champions Challenge I ====
Champions Challenge I
Year	Final Host	Position	Pld	W	D	L	GF	GA
2002	Johannesburg, South Africa	3rd place, bronze medalist(s)	5	2	2	1	10	9
2011	(Republic of Ireland) Dublin, Ireland	7th	6	2	1	3	11	8
2012	(Republic of Ireland) Dublin, Ireland	7th	6	2	1	3	13	15
2014	Glasgow, Scotland	8th	6	0	0	6	7	22
	Total	Third place	23	6	4	13	41	54

==== Champions Challenge II ====
Champions Challenge II
Year	Final Host	Position	Pld	W	D	L	GF	GA
2009	Kazan, Russia	1st place, gold medalist(s)	5	5	0	0	26	9
	Total	1 title	5	5	0	0	26	9

==== Hockey Series ====
Hockey Series
Year	Final Host	Position	Pld	W	D	L	GF	GA
2018–19	Hiroshima, Japan	1st place, gold medalist(s)	5	5	0	0	27	4
	Total	1 title	5	5	0	0	27	4

==== Afro-Asian Games ====
Afro-Asian Games
Year	Final Host	Position	Pld	W	D	L	GF	GA
2003	Hyderabad, India	1st place, gold medalist(s)	5	4	0	1	26	7
	Total	1 title	5	4	0	1	26	7

==== Hawke's Bay Cup ====
Hawke's Bay Cup
Year	Host	Position	Pld	W	D	L	GF	GA
2015	Hastings, New Zealand	7th	6	1	1	4	7	15
2016	Hastings, New Zealand	6th	6	1	1	4	4	11
	Total	6th	12	2	2	8	11	26

==== IFWHA World Conference ====
IFWHA World Conference
Year	Host	Position	Pld	W	D	L	GF	GA
1953 (Note: The tournament was not sanctioned by the FIH. So all the matches played are not counted as official.)	Folkestone, England	10th	6	2	0	4	11	27
1956	Sydney, Australia	9th	6	0	1	5	4	31
1971	Auckland, New Zealand	14th	7	1	1	5	5	11
1975	Edinburgh, Scotland	8th	6	2	1	3	5	11
1979	Vancouver, United States	13th	7	4	0	3	23	12
	Total		32	9	3	20	48	92

== Honours ==
=== Major tournaments ===
- Asian Games:
  - (gold) Gold medal: 1982, 2026
  - (silver) Silver medal: 1998, 2018
  - (bronze) Bronze medal: 1986, 2006, 2014, 2022
- Asia Cup:
  - (gold) Champions: 2004, 2017
  - (silver) Runner-up: 1999, 2009, 2025
  - (bronze) Third Place: 1993, 2013, 2022
- Asian Champions Trophy:
  - (gold) Champions: 2016, 2023, 2024
  - (silver) Runner-up: 2013, 2018
  - (silver) Third Place: 2010
- Pro League:
  - (bronze) Bronze Medal: 2021–22
- Nations Cup:
  - (gold) Champions: 2022, 2025–26
- Commonwealth Games:
  - (gold) Gold medal: 2002
  - (silver) Silver medal: 2006
  - (bronze) Bronze medal: 2022

=== Other tournaments ===
- South Asian Games:
  - (gold) Gold medal: 2016

=== Defunct tournaments ===
- Champions Challenge I:
  - (bronze) Bronze medal: 2002
- Champions Challenge II:
  - (gold) Champions: 2009
- Hockey Series:
  - (gold) Champions: 2018–19

== Results and fixtures ==
Win Draw Loss Fixture

=== Past results ===
- 2021–24 results
- 2025 results

=== 2026 ===
All times are in IST

8 March World Cup Qualifiers Pool B	India	4–0	Uruguay	Hyderabad, India
19:30	Toppo 21'; Ishika 40'; Lalremsiami 49'; Rutuja 58'	Report		Stadium: G. M. C. Balayogi Hockey Ground

9 March World Cup Qualifiers Pool B	Scotland	2–2	India	Hyderabad, India
19:30	McEwan 6'; Burnet 33'	Report	Navneet 18'; Toppo 29'	Stadium: G. M. C. Balayogi Hockey Ground

11 March World Cup Qualifiers Pool B	India	4–1	Wales	Hyderabad, India
19:30	Sakshi 7'; Navneet 29', 34', 55'	Report	Thomas 39'	Stadium: G. M. C. Balayogi Hockey Ground

13 March World Cup Qualifiers Semi-final	India	1–0	Italy	Hyderabad, India
19:30	Chauhan 40'	Report		Stadium: G. M. C. Balayogi Hockey Ground

14 March World Cup Qualifiers Final	England	2–0	India	Hyderabad, India
19:30	Balsdon 13'; Neal 43'	Report		Stadium: G. M. C. Balayogi Hockey Ground

13 April Tour of Argentina	Argentina	4–2	India	Buenos Aires, Argentina
19:30	Larsen 11'; V. Granatto 18'; Jankunas 42', 55'		Navneet 22'; Annu 29'	Stadium: Club Ciudad de Bolívar

14 April Tour of Argentina	Argentina	2–1	India	Buenos Aires, Argentina
19:30	Gorzelany 34', 48'		Ishika 22'	Stadium: Club Ciudad de Bolívar

16 April Tour of Argentina	Argentina	1–2	India	Buenos Aires, Argentina
19:30	Gorzelany 52'		Navneet 32'; Neha 37'	Stadium: Club Ciudad de Bolívar

17 April Tour of Argentina	Argentina	0–0 (2–3 p)	India	Buenos Aires, Argentina
19:30				Stadium: Club Ciudad de Bolívar

26 May Tour of Australia	Australia	2–1	India	Perth, Australia
17:00	Wilson 36', 53'	Report	Navneet 13'	Stadium: Perth Hockey Stadium

27 May Tour of Australia	Australia	1–1 (2–4 p)	India	Perth, Australia
17:00	Downes 10'	Report	Sushila 46'	Stadium: Perth Hockey Stadium
	Penalties
			(penalty shoot-out scored) Navneet; (penalty shoot-out scored) Ishika; (penalty shoot-out scored) Annu; (penalty shoot-out scored) Rutuja

29 May Tour of Australia	Australia	0–2	India	Perth, Australia
11:00		Report	Sonam 36'; Lalremsiami 49'	Stadium: Perth Hockey Stadium

30 May Tour of Australia	Australia	3–2	India	Perth, Australia
11:00	Wilson 42'; Downes 44'; Schonell 58'	Report	Navneet 2'; Soreng 23'	Stadium: Perth Hockey Stadium

15 June FIH Nations Cup Pool A	India	3–2	United States	Auckland, New Zealand
04:15	Deepika 17', 24'; Navneet 28'	Report	Sessa 4'; Zimmer 7'	Stadium: North Harbour Hockey Stadium

16 June FIH Nations Cup Pool A	Japan	1–2	India	Auckland, New Zealand
06:30	Hiramitsu 35'	Report	Salima 33'; Lalremsiami 49'	Stadium: North Harbour Hockey Stadium

18 June FIH Nations Cup Pool A	India	3–2	Uruguay	Auckland, New Zealand
04:15	Deepika 24', 56'; Soreng 43'	Report	Appennino 13'; Vilar 55'	Stadium: North Harbour Hockey Stadium

20 June FIH Nations Cup Semi-final	India	6–0	Chile	Auckland, New Zealand
09:30	Navneet 6', 13'; Deepika 14', 18'; Neha 32'; Rutuja 39'	Report		Stadium: North Harbour Hockey Stadium

21 June FIH Nations Cup Final	India	2–0	New Zealand	Auckland, New Zealand
12:00	Navneet 4'; Sunelita 15'	Report		Stadium: North Harbour Hockey Stadium

31 July Tour of Germany	Germany	3–0	India	Heilbronn, Germany
19:30		Report		Stadium: Hockey Club TSG

1 August Tour of Germany	Germany	1–0	India	Heilbronn, Germany
19:30		Report		Stadium: Hockey Club TSG

13 August Friendly Match	Netherlands	2–0	India
		Result

16 August World Cup Pool D	China	2–2	India	Amstelveen, Netherlands
16:30	Zhang 15'; Ma 39'	Report	Navneet 8'; Deepika 25'	Stadium: Wagener Stadium

18 August World Cup Pool D	India	6–1	South Africa	Amstelveen, Netherlands
18:30	Toppo 11'; Navneet 17'; Pukhrambam 25'; Deepika 38'; Lalremsiami 44'; Rana 45'	Report	de Waal 55'	Stadium: Wagener Stadium

20 August World Cup Pool D	India	0–0	England	Amstelveen, Netherlands
18:30		Report		Stadium: Wagener Stadium

21 August World Cup Pool E	Netherlands	2–0	India	Amstelveen, Netherlands
21:30	Y. Jansen 2'; Matla 38'	Report		Stadium: Wagener Stadium

23 August World Cup Pool E	Australia	0–0	India	Amstelveen, Netherlands
22:30		Report		Stadium: Wagener Stadium

27 August World Cup 5th place match	India	3–1	Germany	Amstelveen, Netherlands
18:30	Ishika 43'; Navneet 44', 47'	Report	Krings 59'	Stadium: Wagener Stadium

20 September Asian Games Pool B	India	19–0	Uzbekistan	Kakamigahara, Japan
07:30	Lalremsiami 7'; Deepika 8', 22', 25', 33', 36', 38', 41', 54'; Ishika 11', 42', 54'; Baljeet 12'; Neha 18'; Navneet 23', 45'; Lalthantluangi 43', 51'; Rana 43'	Report		Stadium: Gifu Prefectural Green Stadium

21 September Asian Games Pool B	India	17–1	Indonesia	Kakamigahara, Japan
09:30	Deepika 8', 28', 40'; Toppo 11', 30'; Lalremsiami 12', 16'; Pisal 15', 20', 38'; Rana 25', 57'; Tete 34'; Navneet 35', 56', 57'; Ishika 36'	Report	Aditiya 32'	Stadium: Gifu Prefectural Green Stadium

23 September Asian Games Pool B	Thailand	1–20	India	Kakamigahara, Japan
11:30	Samanso 57'	Report	Deepika 2', 8', 9', 24', 33', 36', 39', 51', 57'; Navneet 4', 29', 35', 51'; Pisal 10', 11', 47'; Neha 19'; Lalremsiami 26'; Rana 29'; Tete 45'	Stadium: Gifu Prefectural Green Stadium

25 September Asian Games Pool B	Japan	1–3	India	Kakamigahara, Japan
15:30	Kobayakawa 46'	Report	Lalremsiami 5'; Ishika 30'; Navneet 36'	Stadium: Gifu Prefectural Green Stadium

27 September Asian Games Pool B	India	7–0	Singapore	Kakamigahara, Japan
15:30	Tete 17'; Toppo 22', 24'; Lalremsiami 26'; Pisal 29'; Pradhan 35'; Deepika 55'	Report		Stadium: Gifu Prefectural Green Stadium

30 September Asian Games Semi-final	India	2–0	South Korea	Kakamigahara, Japan
15:30	Ishika 44'; Tete 48'	Report		Stadium: Gifu Prefectural Green Stadium

2 October Asian Games Gold medal match	China	0–1	India	Kakamigahara, Japan
16:30		Report	Lalremsiami 10'	Stadium: Gifu Prefectural Green Stadium

19 November 2026 ACT Round-robin	India	4–1	Malaysia	Bhopal, India
16:35	Mumtaz 20'; Tete 35'; Puja 39'; Lalremsiami 49'	Report	Zulkifli 19'	Stadium: Barkheda Nathu International Sports Complex

21 November 2026 ACT Round-robin	India	2–1	South Korea	Bhopal, India
19:00	Mumtaz 30'; Toppo 34'	Report	Hong 56'	Stadium: Barkheda Nathu International Sports Complex

22 November 2026 ACT Round-robin	Thailand	0–7	India	Bhopal, India
17:15		Report	Navneet 4', 56'; Deepika 10', 11', 56'; Mumtaz 28'; Toppo 32'	Stadium: Barkheda Nathu International Sports Complex

24 November 2026 ACT Round-robin	India	v	China	Bhopal, India
19:00				Stadium: Barkheda Nathu International Sports Complex

25 November 2026 ACT Round-robin	Japan	v	India	Bhopal, India
19:00				Stadium: Barkheda Nathu International Sports Complex

=== 2027 ===
All times are in IST

9 February 2027 Pro League Argentina leg	India	v	Germany	TBD, Argentina
				Stadium: TBD

10 February 2027 Pro League Argentina leg	Argentina	v	India	TBD, Argentina
				Stadium: TBD

12 February 2027 Pro League Argentina leg	Germany	v	India	TBD, Argentina
				Stadium: TBD

13 February 2027 Pro League Argentina leg	Argentina	v	India	TBD, Argentina
				Stadium: TBD

23 February 2027 Pro League India leg	India	v	Great Britain	TBD, India
17:00				Stadium: TBD

25 February 2027 Pro League India leg	India	v	Spain	TBD, India
17:00				Stadium: TBD

26 February 2027 Pro League India leg	India	v	Great Britain	TBD, India
17:00				Stadium: TBD

28 February 2027 Pro League India leg	India	v	Spain	TBD, India
17:00				Stadium: TBD

12 June 2027 Pro League Germany leg	India	v	China	Berlin, Germany
14:30				Stadium: Ernst Reuter Sportfeld

13 June 2027 Pro League Germany leg	China	v	India	Berlin, Germany
13:30				Stadium: Ernst Reuter Sportfeld

15 June 2027 Pro League Germany leg	Australia	v	India	Berlin, Germany
15:30				Stadium: Ernst Reuter Sportfeld

16 June 2027 Pro League Germany leg	India	v	Australia	Berlin, Germany
15:30				Stadium: Ernst Reuter Sportfeld

22 June 2027 Pro League Netherlands leg	Netherlands	v	India	's-Hertogenbosch, Netherlands
21:00				Stadium: HC 's-Hertogenbosch

23 June 2027 Pro League Netherlands leg	Netherlands	v	India	's-Hertogenbosch, Netherlands
21:00				Stadium: HC 's-Hertogenbosch

26 June 2027 Pro League Belgium leg	Belgium	v	India	Wavre, Belgium
17:00				Stadium: Belfius Hockey Arena

27 June 2027 Pro League Belgium leg	Belgium	v	India	Wavre, Belgium
17:00				Stadium: Belfius Hockey Arena

=== 2026 goalscorers ===
Goals updated as of 22 November 2026, after the match against Thailand.

2026 goalscorers
Rank	Players	FG	PC	PS	Total
1	Deepika	3	29	0	32
2	Navneet Kaur	11	9	4	24
3	Lalremsiami	7	4	0	11
4	Sunelita Toppo	2	8	0	10
5	Rutuja Pisal	9	0	0	9
6	Ishika Sambharwal	6	2	0	8
7	Sakshi Rana	5	1	0	12
7	Salima Tete	4	2	0	12
9	Neha	3	0	0	6
9	Mumtaz Khan	3	0	0	6
11	Lalthantluangi	0	1	1	2
12	Deepika Soreng	1	0	0	6
12	Baljeet Kaur	1	0	0	6
12	Sushila Chanu Pukhrambam	0	1	0	6
12	Manisha Chauhan	0	1	0	6
12	Nikki Pradhan	0	1	0	6
12	Puja Sahoo	0	1	0	6
Total		55	60	5	120

== Team ==
=== Current squad ===
The following players are named for the 2026 Women's Asian Champions Trophy.

Caps and Goals updated as of 22 November 2026, after the match against Thailand.

No.	Pos.	Player	Date of birth (age)	Caps	Goals	Club
9	GK	Bichu Devi Kharibam	3 December 2000 (age 25)	81	0	(India) Indian Oil Corporation
10	GK	Bansari Solanki	24 May 2001 (age 25)	7	0	(India) Income Tax
2	DF	Jyoti Singh	6 October 2004 (age 22)	15	0	(India) Railways
8	DF	Nikki Pradhan	8 December 1993 (age 32)	221	3	(India) Railways
27	DF	Sushila Chanu Pukhrambam	25 February 1992 (age 34)	277	7	(India) Railways
24	DF	Jyoti Rumavat	11 December 1999 (age 26)	118	8	(India) Indian Oil Corporation
37	DF	Lalthantluangi	10 November 2005 (age 21)	15	2	(India) Railways
40	DF	Puja Sahoo	2 December 2006 (age 19)	3	1	(India) Hockey Odisha
23	MF	Ishika Sambharwal	5 October 2005 (age 21)	25	8	(India) Railways
30	MF	Salima Tete (captain)	27 December 2001 (age 24)	171	22	(India) Railways
32	MF	Neha Goyal	15 November 1996 (age 30)	215	26	(India) Railways
29	MF	Sunelita Toppo	11 April 2007 (age 19)	68	12	(India) Railways
39	MF	Sakshi Rana	31 August 2007 (age 19)	33	7	(India) Hockey Haryana
35	MF	Rutuja Pisal	28 November 2002 (age 23)	45	16	Union Bank of India
22	MF	Baljeet Kaur	23 March 2001 (age 25)	59	3	(India) Indian Oil Corporation
20	FW	Lalremsiami Hmarzote	30 March 2000 (age 26)	202	55	(India) Railways
25	FW	Navneet Kaur (vice-captain)	26 January 1996 (age 30)	227	86	(India) Railways
55	FW	Deepika Sehrawat	12 June 2003 (age 23)	85	63	(India) Indian Oil Corporation
52	FW	Beauty Dungdung	21 July 2003 (age 23)	48	6	(India) Indian Oil Corporation
15	FW	Mumtaz Khan	15 January 2003 (age 23)	22	9	(India) Indian Oil Corporation

=== Recent call-ups ===
These players were called up in the last 12 months.

Pos.	Player	Date of birth (age)	Caps	Goals	Club	Latest call-up
GK	Savita Punia	11 July 1990 (age 36)	326	0	(India) NCOE	2026 Asian Games
DF	Shilpi Dabas	26 July 1998 (age 28)	17	0	(India) Hockey Haryana	2026 Asian Games
DF	Manisha Chauhan	6 March 1999 (age 27)	27	3	(India) Railways	2026 World Cup Qualifiers
DF	Udita Duhan	14 January 1998 (age 28)	138	17	(India) Indian Oil Corporation	2026 World Cup Qualifiers
DF	Suman Devi Thoudam	16 July 1999 (age 27)	27	0	(India) Indian Oil Corporation Ltd	2025 Asia Cup
MF	Sonam	26 May 2005 (age 21)	1	0	(India) Madhya Pradesh HA	2025–26 FIH Nations Cup
MF	Vaishnavi Phalke	23 December 2003 (age 22)	69	9	(India) Income Tax	2026 World Cup Qualifiers
MF	Sharmila Godara	10 October 2001 (age 25)	89	10	(India) Indian Oil Corporation	2025 Asia Cup
MF	Deepika Soreng	17 December 2003 (age 22)	12	1	(India) Railways	2026 Asian Games
FW	Annu	12 December 2002 (age 23)	5	0	(India) Railways	2025–26 FIH Nations Cup
FW	Sangita Kumari	24 December 2001 (age 24)	71	30	(India) Railways	2025 Asia Cup
MF	Ishika Chaudhary	15 April 2000 (age 26)	94	1	(India) Indian Oil Corporation	2026 Asian Games
^{INJ} Withdrew due to injury^{PRE} Preliminary squad / standby^{RET} Retired from the national team^{WD} Player withdrew from the squad due to non-injury issue.

=== Coaching staff ===
Position	Name
Head coach	(Netherlands) Sjoerd Marijne
Analytical coach	(Argentina) Matias Vila
Coaches	(India) Yendala Soundarya (India) Ankitha B. S.
Scientific advisor	(South Africa) Dr. Wayne Lombard (South Africa) Rodet Yila (South Africa) Ciara Yila

== Individual records ==
Players in bold are still active, at least at international level.

Caps and Goals updated as of 22 November 2026, after the match against Thailand.

=== Most caps ===
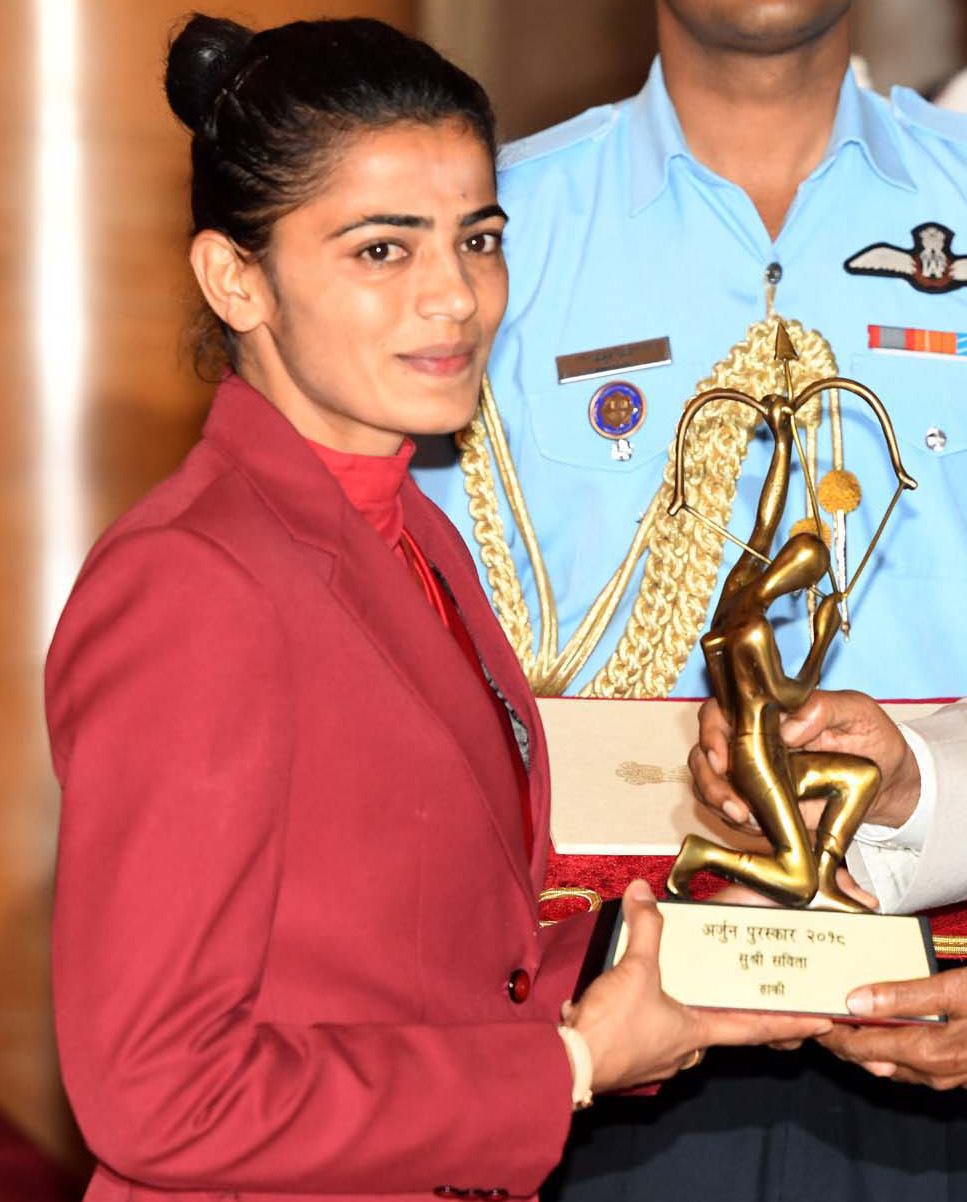
Savita Punia, India's most-capped women's field hockey player

Position	Player	Caps
1	**Savita Punia**	326
2	Vandana Katariya	320
3	**Sushila Chanu Pukhrambam**	277
4	Deep Grace Ekka	268
5	Rani Rampal	254
6	Ritu Rani	248
7	Monika Malik	229
8	Surinder Kaur	229
9	**Navneet Kaur**	227
10	**Nikki Pradhan**	221
11	Navjot Kaur	209
12	**Neha Goyal**	215
13	Poonam Rani	204
14	**Lalremsiami**	202
15	Saba Anjum Karim	200

=== Players with most goals for India in Olympics ===
Position	Player	Goals
1	Rup Kumari Saini	4
1	Gurjit Kaur	4
1	Vandana Katariya	4
2	Nisha Sharma	2
2	Prem Maya Sonir	2
2	Rani Rampal	2

=== Top goal scorers for India in Olympics by year ===
Position	Player	Goals	Year
1	Rup Kumari Saini	**4**	1980
2	Lilima Minz; Rani Rampal; Anuradha Thokchom	**1**	2016
3	Gurjit Kaur; Vandana Katariya	**4**	2020

=== Players with most goals for India in World Cup ===
Position	Player	Goals
1	Rani Rampal	**8**
2	**Navneet Kaur**	**6**
3	Surinder Kaur	**5**
4	Vandana Katariya	**4**

=== Top scorers for India in World Cup by year ===
Position	Player	Goals	Year
1	Rani Rampal	**7**	2010
2	Surinder Kaur	**5**	2006
3	**Navneet Kaur**	**4**	2026
4	Vandana Katariya	**3**	2022

== Head-to-head record ==
Won more matches than lost
All matches drawn
Won equal matches to lost
Lost more matches than won

=== Overall record ===
Record last updated as of the following match:

India vs Thailand at Nathu Barkheda International Sports Complex, Bhopal in the 2026 Women's Asian Champions Trophy, 22 November 2026

Opponent	GP	W	D	L	Win %	Last meeting
Argentina	28	1	6	21	3.57%	2025
Australia	52	7	9	36	13.46%	2026
Austria	2	2	0	0	100%	1989
Azerbaijan	6	6	0	0	100%	2012
Belarus	8	8	0	0	100%	2017
Belgium	15	2	1	12	13.33%	2025
Canada	19	13	5	1	68.42%	2022
Chile	7	6	1	0	85.71%	2026
China	53	14	7	32	26.42%	2026
Chinese Taipei	1	1	0	0	100%	2006
Czechoslovakia	2	1	0	1	50%	1980
England	46	7	14	25	15.22%	2026
Fiji	2	2	0	0	100%	2019
France	4	3	0	1	75%	2008
Germany	28	4	4	20	14.29%	2026
Ghana	3	3	0	0	100%	2022
Great Britain	9	0	2	7	0%	2024
Hong Kong	7	7	0	0	100%	2023
Indonesia	2	2	0	0	100%	2026
Ireland	29	10	4	15	34.48%	2023
Italy	10	8	1	1	80%	2026
Jamaica	2	2	0	0	100%	1998
Japan	80	26	18	36	32.50%	2026
Kazakhstan	7	7	0	0	100%	2018
Lithuania	1	1	0	0	100%	2001
Malaysia	44	40	4	0	90.91%	2026
Mexico	1	1	0	0	100%	1974
Nepal	1	1	0	0	100%	2016
Netherlands Antilles	2	0	0	2	0%	2008
Netherlands	23	2	2	19	8.70%	2026
New Zealand	37	13	1	23	35.14%	2026
Nigeria	1	1	0	0	100%	2006
North Korea	1	1	0	0	100%	1990
Poland	6	6	0	0	100%	2019
Russia	4	3	0	1	75%	2013
Scotland	16	4	4	8	25%	2026
Singapore	12	12	0	0	100%	2026
South Africa	24	13	3	8	54.17%	2026
South Korea	53	22	5	26	41.51%	2026
Soviet Union	3	1	0	2	33.33%	1993
Spain	23	9	6	8	39.13%	2025
Sri Lanka	2	2	0	0	100%	2016
Switzerland	1	1	0	0	100%	1985
Thailand	16	16	0	0	100%	2026
Trinidad and Tobago	4	4	0	0	100%	2014
Ukraine	3	1	2	0	33.33%	2012
United States	37	9	10	18	24.32%	2026
Uruguay	5	4	1	0	80%	2026
Uzbekistan	3	2	1	0	66.66%	2026
Wales	8	6	1	1	75%	2026
Zimbabwe	2	1	1	0	50%	1985
Total	755	318	113	324	42.12%	2026

=== Olympic Games ===
Record last updated as of the following match:

India vs Great Britain at Oi Hockey Stadium, Tokyo in the 2020 Olympics, 6 August 2021

Opponent	GP	W	D	L	Win %	Last meeting
Argentina	2	0	0	2	0%	2021
Australia	2	1	0	1	50%	2021
Austria	1	1	0	0	100%	1980
Czechoslovakia	1	0	0	1	0%	1980
Germany	1	0	0	1	0%	2021
Great Britain	3	0	0	3	0%	2021
Ireland	1	1	0	0	100%	2021
Japan	1	0	1	0	0%	2016
Netherlands	1	0	0	1	0%	2021
Poland	1	1	0	0	100%	1980
South Africa	1	1	0	0	100%	2021
Soviet Union	1	0	0	1	0%	1980
United States	1	0	0	1	0%	2016
Zimbabwe	1	0	1	0	0%	1980

=== World Cup ===
Record last updated as of the following match:

India vs Germany at Wagener Stadium, Amstelveen in the 2026 World Cup, 27 August 2026

Opponent	GP	W	D	L	Win %	Last meeting
Argentina	4	0	0	4	0%	1998
Australia	3	0	1	2	0%	2026
Belgium	1	0	0	1	0%	1974
Canada	2	0	2	0	0%	2022
China	4	0	2	2	0%	2026
Czechoslovakia	1	1	0	0	100%	1978
England	5	0	4	1	0%	2026
West Germany	1	0	0	1	0%	1974
Germany	3	1	0	2	33.33%	2026
Ireland	2	0	1	1	0%	2018
Italy	1	1	0	0	100%	2018
Japan	3	2	0	1	66.67%	2022
Mexico	1	1	0	0	100%	1974
Netherlands	7	1	0	6	14.29%	2026
New Zealand	3	0	0	3	0%	2022
Scotland	2	0	0	2	0%	1998
South Africa	3	3	0	0	100%	2026
South Korea	2	0	0	2	0%	2006
Spain	4	2	0	2	50%	2022
United States	2	0	1	1	0%	2018
Wales	2	1	1	0	50%	1983

== Medal matches ==
=== Summer Olympics ===
==== 2020 bronze medal match ====
6 August 2021
10:30

(bronze) Great Britain	4–3	India
Rayer 16'; Robertson 24'; Pearne-Webb 35'; Balsdon 48'	Report	Gurjit 25', 26'; Vandana 29'

Oi Hockey Stadium, Tokyo
Umpires:
Michelle Joubert (RSA)
Michelle Meister (GER)

=== World Cup ===
==== 1974 third and fourth place ====
24 March 1974
15:00

India	0–2	West Germany (bronze)
	Report	Drescher; Klimpel-Raabe

Mandelieu
Umpires:
Sophia Molendijk (NED)
E. Rodríguez (ARG)

== Awards ==
Summer Olympics

- At the 2008 Olympic Qualifier, Rani Devi received the Most Promising Young Player of the Tournament award. (Squad)

Hockey World Cup

- At the 2001 Women's Hockey World Cup Qualifier, Sanggai Chanu received the Young Player of the Tournament award. (Squad)

Hockey Champions Challenge

- During the 2002 Hockey Champions Challenge, Jyoti Sunita Kullu received the Topscorer award for five goals. (Squad)

Dhyan Chand Award

- Mary D'Souza Sequeira (1953–1963)

Arjuna Awards

The following is a list of recipients for the Arjuna award in hockey recipients (by year):

- Helen Mary, 2004
- Suraj Lata Devi (former captain), 2003
- Mamta Kharab, 2002
- Madhu Yadav, 2000
- Tingongleima Chanu, 2000
- S. Omana Kumari, 1998
- Pritam Rani Siwach (former captain), 1998
- Prem Maya Sonir, 1985
- Rajbir Kaur, 1984
- Varsha Soni, 1981
- Eliza Nelson, 1980–1981
- Rekha B.Mundhphan, 1979–1980
- Lorraine Fernandes, 1976–1977
- Ajinder Kaur, 1975–1976
- Dr Otilia Mascarenhas, 1973–1974
- Sunita Puri, 1966
- Elvera Britto, 1965
- Anne Lumsden, 1961

== See also ==
Indian national hockey teams
Men's					Women's				
Senior	Under-21	Under-18	Senior Hockey5s	Under-18 hockey5s	Senior	Under-21	Under-18	Senior Hockey5s	Under-18 hockey5s

- Field hockey in India
- India national para hockey team
- Chak De India
