= Women's Hockey Champions Challenge II =

Former field hockey tournament

- Sport: Field hockey
- Founded: 2009
- Folded: 2011
- Replaced by: FIH Hockey World League
- No. of teams: 8
- Last champion: Belgium (1st title)
- Most titles: Belgium; India (1 title)
- Website: www.fihockey.org

The Women's Hockey Champions Challenge II is a former international field hockey competition. The tournament was only contested on two occasions, in 2009 and 2011.

In 2011, the tournament was disbanded to make way for the FIH Hockey World League, which began in 2012.

Belgium and India were the only teams to triumph at the Champions Challenge II in its two editions, with Belgium being the most recent winners.

== Results ==
=== Summaries ===
Year	Host	Final			3rd Place Match		
Year	Host	Champions	Score	Runners-up	3rd place	Score	4th place
2009	Kazan, Russia	India	6–3	Belgium	Ireland	2–1	Ukraine
2011	Vienna, Austria	Belgium	2–1	Italy	Belarus	2–2 (3–1 pen.)	Chile

=== Successful national teams ===
Team	Titles	Runners-up	Third places	Fourth places
Belgium	1 (2011)	1 (2009)		
India	1 (2009)			
Italy		1 (2011)		
Ireland			1 (2009)	
Belarus			1 (2011)	
Ukraine				1 (2009)
Chile				1 (2011)

=== Team appearances ===
Team	2009	2011	Total
Austria	-	8th	1
Belarus	5th	3rd	2
Belgium	2nd	1st	2
Canada	6th	7th	2
Chile	-	4th	1
India	1st	-	1
Ireland	3rd	-	1
Italy	-	2nd	1
Malaysia	7th	6th	2
Russia	8th	5th	2
Ukraine	4th	-	1
Total	8	8	16
