= 2023 Women's Hockey Junior Asia Cup =

International women's field hockey tournament

2023 Women's Junior Asia Cup
Tournament details
- Host country: Japan
- City: Kakamigahara
- Dates: 3–11 June
- Teams: 10 (from 1 confederation)
- Venue: Kawasaki Heavy Industries Hockey Stadium

Final positions
- Champions: India (1st title)
- Runner-up: South Korea
- Third place: Japan

Tournament statistics
- Matches played: 29
- Goals scored: 228 (7.86 per match)
- Top scorer: (India) Annu (9 goals)
- Best player: (Japan) Maho Ueno
- Best young player: (India) Anjali Barwa
- Best goalkeeper: (South Korea) Lee Seo-yeon

The 2023 Women's Hockey Junior Asia Cup was the eighth edition of the Women's Hockey Junior Asia Cup, the women's international under-21 field hockey championship of Asia organized by the Asian Hockey Federation. It was held from 3 to 11 June 2023 in Kakamigahara, Japan.

The top three teams qualified for the 2023 Women's FIH Hockey Junior World Cup in Santiago, Chile.

== Qualification ==
Dates	Event	Location	Quotas	Qualifiers
—N/a	FIH Women's World Ranking	—N/a	5	China; India; Japan; Malaysia; South Korea
12–20 October 2022	2022 Junior AHF Cup	Taldykorgan, Kazakhstan	5	Chinese Taipei; Hong Kong; Indonesia; Kazakhstan; Uzbekistan
Total			10	

== Preliminary round ==
=== Pool A ===
Pos	Team	Pld	W	D	L	GF	GA	GD	Pts	Qualification
1	India	4	3	1	0	37	3	+34	10	Semi-finals
2	South Korea	4	3	1	0	23	4	+19	10	Semi-finals
3	Malaysia	4	2	0	2	21	5	+16	6	
4	Chinese Taipei	4	1	0	3	3	24	−21	3	
5	Uzbekistan	4	0	0	4	1	49	−48	0	

Source: FIH
Rules for classification: 1) points; 2) matches won; 3) goal difference; 4) goals for; 5) head-to-head result; 6) field goals for.

3 June 2023
12:00

South Korea	5–1	Chinese Taipei
Choi S. 6'; Park M. 19'; An 24', 42'; Jeong 40'	Report	Huang 49'

Umpires:
Sheena Hori (JPN)
Yao Liu (CHN)

3 June 2023
14:00

India	22–0	Uzbekistan
Vaishnavi 3', 56'; Mumtaz 6', 44', 47', 60'; Annu 13', 29', 30', 38', 43', 51'; Sunelita 17', 17'; Deepika S. 18', 25'; Manju 26'; Deepika K. 32', 44', 46', 57'; Neelam 47'	Report

Umpires:
Shi Him Tang (HKG)
Zarina Ilyassova (KAZ)

4 June 2023
12:00

Malaysia	7–0	Chinese Taipei
Nur M. 20'; Nur Y. 22', 37'; Siti 30', 40'; Nurul 32'; Thibatharshini 35'	Report

Umpires:
Shi Him Tang (HKG)
Valerie Koh (SGP)

4 June 2023
14:00

South Korea	13–0	Uzbekistan
An 4', 13', 16'; Lee Y. 5'; Jeong 22', 45', 58'; Park S. 34', 59'; Choi S. 35'; Choi J. 37'; Lee S. 45'; Park M. 55'	Report

Umpires:
Kristy Robertson (AUS)
Yao Liu (CHN)

5 June 2023
12:00

Malaysia	1–2	India
Dian 6'	Report	Mumtaz 10'; Deepika K. 26'

Umpires:
Sandra Adell (ESP)
Yao Liu (CHN)

5 June 2023
14:00

Chinese Taipei	2–1	Uzbekistan
Huang 18', 25'	Report	Abdullaeva 60'

Umpires:
Sheena Hori (JPN)
Shi Him tang (HKG)

6 June 2023
12:00

Uzbekistan	0–12	Malaysia
	Report	Dian 1', 22', 52'; Kirandeep 10', 25'; Khairunnisa 11'; Zati 26', 27', 30'; Norshafiqha 42', 53'; Nur M. 45'

Umpires:
Zarina Ilyassova (KAZ)
Sheena Hori (JPN)

6 June 2023
14:00

South Korea	2–2	India
Lee Y. 15'; Choi J. 30'	Report	Deepika S. 43'; Deepika K. 54'

Umpires:
Kristy Robertson (AUS)
Valerie Koh (SGP)

8 June 2023
14:00

Malaysia	1–3	South Korea
Norshafiqha 38'	Report	An 4'; Song 38'; Lee Y. 48'

Umpires:
Kristy Robertson (AUS)
Sandra Adell (ESP)

8 June 2023
16:00

India	11–0	Chinese Taipei
Vaishnavi 1'; Deepika K. 3'; Annu 10', 52'; Rutuja 12'; Neelam 19'; Manju 33'; Sunelita 43', 57'; Deepika S. 46'; Mumtaz 55'	Report

Umpires:
Kim Yoon Seon (KOR)
Shi Him Tang (HKG)

=== Pool B ===
Pos	Team	Pld	W	D	L	GF	GA	GD	Pts	Qualification
1	China	4	4	0	0	44	0	+44	12	Semi-finals
2	Japan (H)	4	3	0	1	52	1	+51	9	Semi-finals
3	Kazakhstan	4	2	0	2	9	22	−13	6	
4	Hong Kong	4	0	1	3	0	37	−37	1	
5	Indonesia	4	0	1	3	0	45	−45	1	

Source: FIH
Rules for classification: 1) points; 2) matches won; 3) goal difference; 4) goals for; 5) head-to-head result; 6) field goals for.
(H) Hosts

3 June 2023
16:00

China	18–0	Indonesia
Zhang D. 5'; Zhang J. 13', 19', 20'; Cai 16', 34'; Hao 22'; Yang 27'; Li 27', 59'; Liu 35', 53'; Wei 35'; Liang 37'; Ni 39', 48'; Huang 48', 59'	Report

Umpires:
Valerie Koh (SGP)
Yogita Pasi (IND)

3 June 2023
18:00

Japan	23–0	Hong Kong
Wakasa 2', 17', 57'; Kawaguchi 4'; Hiramitsu 5', 33'; Ueno 9', 42', 53'; Saito 10'; Kondo 18', 60'; Sasaki 18', 24'; Kitayama 22'; Hayasuke 25', 28', 37'; Matsunami 25', 29', 32'; Oshima 46', 50'	Report

Umpires:
Kristy Robertson (AUS)
Norasyikin Shariudin (MAS)

4 June 2023
16:00

Kazakhstan	3–0	Hong Kong
Beisenbay 23'; Lyapina 32', 42'

Umpires:
Sandra Adell (ESP)
Yogita Pasi (IND)

4 June 2023
18:00

Japan	21–0	Indonesia
Ueno 8', 19', 20', 24', 60'; Mikami 10', 12', 13', 51'; Hayasuke 17'; Murayama 25'; Sasaki 27', 50'; Oshima 30'; Suzuki 36'; Kondo 36', 41'; Hiramitsu 43'; Wakasa 52', 57'; Horikawa 53'	Report

Umpires:
Kim Yoon Seon (KOR)
Liu Yu-Chen (TPE)

5 June 2023
16:00

Hong Kong	0–0	Indonesia
	Report

Umpires:
Norasyikin Shariudin (MAS)
Kim Yoon Seon (KOR)

5 June 2023
18:00

Kazakhstan	0–14	China
	Report	Zhang D. 3', 4', 49', 49', 53'; Hao 5', 44'; Liang 23'; Cai 28'; Zhang J. 30', 31'; Wei 43', 57'; Xu 53'

Umpires:
Yogita Pasi (IND)
Liu Yu-Chen (TPE)

6 June 2023
16:00

Indonesia	0–6	Kazakhstan
	Report	Lobanova 10', 15', 49', 54'; Beisenbay 45'; Lyapina 56'

Umpires:
Kim Yoon Seon (KOR)
Yao Liu (CHN)

6 June 2023
18:00

Japan	0–1	China
	Report	Huang 8'

Umpires:
Sandra Adell (ESP)
Norasyikin Shariudin (MAS)

8 June 2023
12:00

China	11–0	Hong Kong
Ni 1', 59'; Yang 7'; Cai 17', 51'; Li 18'; Cen 27'; Hao 28', 32'; Xu 34'; Hu 44'	Report

Umpires:
Valerie KOH (SGP)
Sheena HORI (JPN)

8 June 2023
18:00

Kazakhstan	0–8	Japan
	Report	Matsunami 8'; Wakasa 12', 54'; Hayasuke 23', 45'; Murayama 31'; Sasaki 32', 49'

Umpires:
Yogita Pasi (IND)
Norasyikin Shariudin (MAS)

== Classification round ==
=== Ninth and tenth place ===
10 June 2023
10:30

Uzbekistan	2–0	Indonesia
Mamatmurodova 28', 38'	Report

Umpires:
Shi Him Tang (HKG)
Yao Liu (CHN)

=== Fifth to eighth place classification ===
==== Bracket ====
5–8th place semi-finals
9 June
Malaysia	10
Hong Kong	1
9 June
Kazakhstan	4
Chinese Taipei	3

Fifth place
11 June
Malaysia	7
Kazakhstan	0
Seventh place
11 June
Hong Kong	0
Chinese Taipei	2

==== 5–8th place semi-finals ====
9 June 2023
14:00

Malaysia	10–1	Hong Kong
Nur M. 2', 14', 39'; Dian 8'; Siti 9'; Norshafiqha 24'; Siti 40'; Khairunnisa 41'; Azmyra 52'; Nur Y. 60'	Report	Aiello 18'

Umpires:
Liu Yu-Chen (TPE)
Yogita Pasi (IND)

9 June 2023
16:30

Kazakhstan	4–3	Chinese Taipei
Berdenova 10'; Izbassarova 18'; Lobanova 27'; Beisenbay 46'	Report	Huang 7'; Wang 43'; Ku 54'

Umpires:
Yao Liu (CHN)
Sheena Hori (JPN)

==== Seventh and eighth place ====
11 June 2023
10:30

Hong Kong	0–2	Chinese Taipei
	Report	Huang Yi 24'; Huang Yu 46'\

Umpires:
Yogita Pasi (IND)
Sheena Hori (JPN)

==== Fifth and sixth place ====
11 June 2023
13:00

Malaysia	7–0	Kazakhstan
Azmyra 14', 44'; Dian 18', 36'; Nur M. 28', 53'; Siti 55'	Report

Umpires:
Valerie Koh (SGP)
Yao Liu (CHN)

== First to fourth place classification ==
=== Bracket ===
Semi-finals
10 June
India	1
Japan	0
10 June
China	0
South Korea	2

Final
11 June
India	2
South Korea	1
Third place
11 June
Japan	2
China	1

=== Semi-finals ===
10 June 2023
13:00

India	1–0	Japan
Sunelita 47'	Report

Umpires:
Kim Yoon Seon (KOR)
Valerie Koh (SGP)

10 June 2023
15:30

China	0–2	South Korea
	Report	Hong 5'; An 18'

Umpires:
Norasyikin Shariudin (MAS)
Sandra Adell (ESP)

=== Third and fourth place ===
11 June 2023
15:30

Japan	2–1	China
Wakasa 17'; Kitayama 47'	Report	Huang 27'

Umpires:
Sandra Adell (ESP)
Kim Yoon Seon (KOR)

=== Final ===
11 June 2023
18:00

India	2–1	South Korea
Annu 22'; Neelam 41'	Report	Park S. 25'

Umpires:
Norasyikin Shariudin (MAS)
Kristy Robertson (AUS)

== Statistics ==
=== Final standings ===
Pos	Team	Qualification
1st place, gold medalist(s)	India	2023 Junior World Cup
2nd place, silver medalist(s)	South Korea	2023 Junior World Cup
3rd place, bronze medalist(s)	Japan (H)	2023 Junior World Cup
4	China	
5	Malaysia	
6	Kazakhstan	
7	Chinese Taipei	
8	Hong Kong	
9	Uzbekistan	
10	Indonesia	

Source: FIH
(H) Host

=== Goalscorers ===
There were 228 goals scored in 29 matches, for an average of 7.86 goals per match.

9 goals

- (India) Annu

8 goals

- (Japan) Maho Ueno
- (Japan) Mai Wakasa

7 goals

- (India) Deepika Kumari
- (Malaysia) Nur Mohammed
- (Malaysia) Dian Nazeri
- (South Korea) An Su-jin

6 goals

- (China) Zhang Dian
- (India) Mumtaz Khan
- (Japan) Sana Hayasuke
- (Japan) Risa Sasaki

5 goals

- (China) Cai Wenqian
- (China) Hao Guoting
- (China) Zhang Jing
- (India) Sunelita Toppo
- (Kazakhstan) Viktoriya Lobanova

4 goals

- (China) Huang Siting
- (China) Ni Yanling
- (Chinese Taipei) Huang Yi-Chun
- (India) Deepika Soreng
- (Japan) Wakana Kondo
- (Japan) Mei Matsunami
- (Japan) Maiko Mikami
- (Malaysia) Norshafiqha Ishak
- (South Korea) Jeong Sa-ena

3 goals

- (China) Li Jingyi
- (China) Wei Yuanmeng
- (India) Neelam
- (India) Vaishnavi Phalke
- (Japan) Ai Hiramitsu
- (Japan) Natsumi Oshima
- (Kazakhstan) Balzhan Beisenbay
- (Kazakhstan) Viktoriya Lyapina
- (Malaysia) Azmyra Azhairy
- (Malaysia) Zati Muhamad
- (Malaysia) Siti Shaikh
- (Malaysia) Nur Yussaini
- (South Korea) Lee Yu-jin
- (South Korea) Park Seo-yeon

2 goals

- (China) Liang Weizhi
- (China) Liu Hui
- (China) Xu Wenjuan
- (China) Yang Yiting
- (Chinese Taipei) Huang Yu-Ting
- (India) Manju Chorsiya
- (Japan) Mahiro Kitayama
- (Japan) Hiroka Murayama
- (Malaysia) Kirandeep Gurdip
- (Malaysia) Khairunnisa Mohd
- (Malaysia) Siti Mohd
- (South Korea) Choi Ji-yun
- (South Korea) Choi Sara
- (South Korea) Park Mi-hyang
- (Uzbekistan) Marjona Mamatmurodova

1 goal

- (China) Cen Hailin
- (China) Hu Linyuan
- (Chinese Taipei) Ku Chen-Yi
- (Chinese Taipei) Wang Yi-Hsuan
- (Hong Kong) Anna Aiello
- (India) Rutaja Pisal
- (Japan) Mayuri Horikawa
- (Japan) Haruka Kawaguchi
- (Japan) Hanami Saito
- (Japan) Sora Suzuki
- (Kazakhstan) Sabina Berdenova
- (Kazakhstan) Gulsina Izbassarova
- (Malaysia) Nurul Azman
- (Malaysia) Thibatharshini James
- (South Korea) Hong Solbeotnara
- (South Korea) Lee Seo-yeon
- (South Korea) Song Sung-eun
- (Uzbekistan) Dilafruz Abdullaeva

Source: FIH

== See also ==
- 2023 Men's Hockey Junior Asia Cup
