= Sunita Puri =

Indian field hockey player

Sunita Puri (died 2020) was a former captain of the India women's national field hockey team. In 1966, she received the Arjuna Award from Government of India for excellence in sports. She is from Delhi state. She was from I.P. College, New Delhi where she participated in various track and field events also viz. Javelin throw, Discus throw, Shot Put other than playing Hockey. She joined Indian Railways and captained the Indian Railways women's hockey team. She played hockey with the Indian and World Hockey Legend..Shri Dhyanchand Ji. Sunita Puri was married to Shri Yatish Chandra (Mehrishi), Ex. Army (1st 11 Gurkha Rifles) who later joined Indian Police Service (IPS - 68 batch) and was an officer in the Madhya Pradesh cadre. She also in the "Vikram Award" committee of the Madhya Pradesh Government.
