= Maho Ueno =

Japanese field hockey player

Personal information
- Born: 19 July 2002 (age 24) Kyoto, Japan
- Height: 161 cm (5 ft 3 in)
- Weight: 61 kg (134 lb)

Sport
- Sport: Field hockey
- Position: Defence
- Club: Ritsumeikan University
National team
Years	Team	Caps	Goals
2023	Japan U–21	16	(10)
2024–	Japan	0	(0)
Medal record
Women's field hockey
Representing Japan
Junior Asian Cup
Bronze medal – third place	2023 Kakamigahara

Maho Ueno (上野 真歩, born 19 July 2002) is a field hockey player from Japan.

== Personal life ==
Maho Ueno was born on 19 July 2002, in Kyoto.

== Career ==
=== Domestic league ===
In the Japanese national league, Ueno represents the Ritsumeikan University Hollys.

=== Under–21 ===
Ueno made her junior international debut in 2023. She made her first appearances for the Japanese U–21 team during a test series against Australia in the Gold Coast. She went on to represent Japan again at the Junior Asian Cup in Kakamigahara, winning the player of the tournament award and a bronze medal. To close out 2023, Ueno represented Japan again at the FIH Junior World Cup in Santiago, concluding the tournament with a seventh-place finish.

=== Cherry Blossoms ===
In 2024, Ueno was named in the senior national team for the first time. She will make her international debut at the Asian Champions Trophy in Rajgir.
