= Lalthantluangi =

Indian field hockey player (born 2005)

Personal information
- Born: Lalthantluangi Fanai; 10 November 2005 (age 20) Kanghmun South, Mizoram, India

Sport
- Sport: Field hockey
- Position: Defender
Senior career
Years	Team	Caps	Goals
–	Hockey Mizoram	-	-
–	Railways	-	-
2025–	Ranchi Royals	-	-
National team
Years	Team	Caps	Goals
2024–2025	India U21	12	(0)
2026–	India	12	(2)
Medal record
Women's field hockey
Representing India
Asian Games
Gold medal – first place	2026 Aichi–Nagoya	Team
Junior Asia Cup
Gold medal – first place	2024 Oman

Lalthantluangi Fanai (born 10 November 2005) is an Indian field hockey player who plays as a defender for the India women's national field hockey team. Hailing from Kanghmun South, Mizoram, she represents both the Railway Sports Promotion Board and Hockey Mizoram in domestic tournaments.

== Early life ==
Lalthantluangi was born on 10 November 2005 in Kanghmun South, a village in Serchhip district, Mizoram, India. She plays as a defender in field hockey.

== Career ==
Lalthantluangi represented Hockey Mizoram in national domestic competitions. She was a member of the Hockey Mizoram team and 14th Hockey India Senior Women National Championship.

She received her first call-up to the Indian senior women's squad for the FIH Women's Nations Cup in 2025. She was selected for India's tour of Australia in 2026.

== See also ==
- Lalremsiami Hmarzote
