= Mei Matsunami =

Japanese field hockey player

Personal information
- Born: 20 November 2003 (age 22) Gifu Prefecture, Japan
- Height: 154 cm (5 ft 1 in)
- Weight: 52 kg (115 lb)

Sport
- Sport: Field hockey
- Position: Midfield
- Club: Crowning Glories
National team
| Years | Team | Caps | Goals |
| 2023– | Japan U–21 | 16 | (5) |
| 2024– | Japan | 0 | (0) |
Medal record
Women's field hockey
Representing Japan
Junior Asian Cup
| Bronze medal – third place | 2023 Kakamigahara |

Mei Matsunami (松波 芽依, born 20 November 2003) is a field hockey player from Japan.

== Personal life ==
Mei Matsunami was born on 20 November 2003, in the Gifu Prefecture.

== Career ==
=== Domestic league ===
In the Japanese national league, Matsunami represents the Crowning Glories.

=== Under–21 ===
Matsunami made her junior international debut in 2023. She made her first appearances for the Japanese U–21 team during a test series against Australia in the Gold Coast. She went on to represent Japan again at the Junior Asian Cup in Kakamigahara, winning a bronze medal. To close out 2023, Matsunami represented Japan again at the FIH Junior World Cup in Santiago, concluding the tournament with a seventh-place finish.

=== Cherry Blossoms ===
In 2024, Matsunami was named in the senior national team for the first time. She will make her international debut at the Asian Champions Trophy in Rajgir.
