= Maharaja Ranjit Singh Award =

Sports award given by Punjab state government

The Maharaja Ranjit Singh Award, is an award given by the Government of Punjab for excellence and achievement in the service of Punjab in the field of Sport. This can be at the Olympic level, World Championship level, national and other international sporting arenas. The award was instituted in 1978 it consists of a trophy of Maharaja Ranjit Singh, honouree citation and 5 lakh Rupees. First person in history to win the Maharaja Ranjit Singh Award was Olympian Pargat Singh. The award was suspended for 10 years between 1996 and 2005 and initiated again in 2006. However, in 2006 the award was given to individuals where it was backdated from 1997 to 2004 so no potential winner lost their chance to win the award.
