= Akari Nakagomi =

Japanese field hockey player

Personal information
- Born: 7 March 2000 (age 26) Yamanashi Prefecture, Japan
- Height: 156 cm (5 ft 1 in)
- Weight: 53 kg (117 lb)

Sport
- Sport: Field hockey
- Position: Midfield
Senior career
Years	Team	Caps	Goals
–	Coca Cola Red Sparks	-	-
National team
Years	Team	Caps	Goals
2022–	Japan	18	(0)
Medal record
Women's field hockey
Representing Japan
FIH Nations Cup
Bronze medal – third place	2022 Valencia	Team
Asian Champions Trophy
Silver medal – second place	2023 Ranchi	Team

Akari Nakagomi (中込 紅莉, born 7 March 2000) is a Japanese field hockey player.

== Personal life ==
Akari Nakagomi was born in the Yamanashi Prefecture.

== Career ==
=== Domestic league ===
In the Japanese national league, Nakagomi represents the Coca Cola Red Sparks.

=== Cherry Blossoms ===
Nakagomi made her senior international debut in 2022 at the FIH Nations Cup in Valencia. At the tournament she won a bronze medal.

In 2023, Nakagomi represented the Cherry Blossoms at the Asian Games in Hangzhou, as well as the Asian Champions Trophy in Ranchi, winning a silver medal at the latter.

She has been named in the squad for the 2024 FIH Olympic Qualifiers in Ranchi.
