= Manisha Chauhan =

Indian field hockey player

Personal information
- Born: 6 March 1999 (age 27) Uttarakhand, India

Sport
- Sport: Field hockey
- Position: Midfielder
- Club: Manipur Hockey
Senior career
Years	Team	Caps	Goals
–	Uttarakhand	-	-
–	Madhya Pradesh Hockey	-	-
–	Manipur Hockey	-	-
–	Railways	-	-
–	Delhi SG Pipers	-	-
National team
Years	Team	Caps	Goals
2024–	India	27	(3)
Medal record
Women's field hockey
Representing India
Asian Champions Trophy
Gold medal – first place	2024 Rajgir

Manisha Chauhan (born 6 March 1999) is an Indian field hockey player who plays as a midfielder for the Indian national team.

She made her senior debut for India against Argentina during the European leg of the 2023–24 Women's FIH Pro League. She was part of the Indian squad at the 2024 Women's Asian Champions Trophy which won the gold medal.
