= An Su-jin =

South Korean field hockey player

Personal information
- Born: 9 January 2002 (age 24) South Korea
- Height: 1.66 m (5 ft 5 in)

Sport
- Sport: Field hockey
- Position: Defence
National team
Years	Team	Caps	Goals
2022–	South Korea	26	(5)
2023	South Korea U–21	6	(7)
Medal record
Men's field hockey
Representing South Korea
Asian Games
Silver medal – second place	2022 Hangzhou	Team
Junior Asian Cup
Silver medal – second place	2023 Kakamigahara	Team

An Su-jin (Korean: 안수진; born 9 January 2002) is a field hockey player from South Korea, who plays as a defender.

== Career ==
=== Under–21 ===
An Su-jin made her debut for the South Korea U–21 side in 2023, at the Junior Asian Cup in Kakamigahara. At the tournament, she was Korea's highest scorer with seven goals, and came away with a silver medal. She has also been named in the squad for the FIH Junior World Cup in Santiago.

=== Senior national team ===
An made her senior international debut in 2022, representing Korea at the FIH World Cup in Amsterdam and Terrassa. She followed this up with an appearance at the FIH Nations Cup in Valencia.

In 2023, An won her first medal with the senior national team, winning silver at the postponed 2022 Asian Games in Hangzhou. She was also included in the nation squad at the Asian Champions Trophy in Ranchi.
