= Annu (field hockey) =

Indian field hockey player (born 2006)

Personal information
- Born: 12 December 2002 (age 23) Roj Khera, Haryana, India

Sport
- Sport: Field hockey
- Position: Forward
Senior career
Years	Team	Caps	Goals
2018–	Hockey Haryana	28	18
National team
Years	Team	Caps	Goals
2023	India U21	16	(19)
2026–	India	5	-
Medal record
Women's field hockey
Representing India
FIH Nations Cup
Gold medal – first place	2026 Auckland
Junior Asia Cup
Gold medal – first place	2023 Kakamigahara

Annu (born 12 December 2002) is an Indian field hockey player from Haryana who plays as a forward for the national senior team.

== Early life ==
Annu hails from Roj Khera village in Haryana. Her mother faces health challenges and her father, Raj Pal, works in farm lands and brick kilns.

== Career ==
Annu trained at the HAU Giri Centre in Hisar under coach Azad Singh. She participated in three editions of Khelo India Youth Games and in national championships representing Haryana.

Annu was the top scorer with 9 goals at the 2023 Junior Asia Cup including one against South Korea in the final that helped her team to win 2–1. She credited Janneke Schopman with helping her improve her game. She competed in an invitational tournament in Dusseldorf where she scored match winning goals against Spain and England.

At the 2023 Junior World Cup, Annu scored hat-trick against Canada. She also scored one against Germany and two goals against Belgium but they did not come in winning cause. She finished as the top scorer for her team in the tournament with seven.

Annu made her debut for the Indian senior team at the 2026 World Cup qualifier match against Uruguay.
