= Vaishnavi Phalke =

Indian field hockey player

Personal information
- Born: Vaishnavi Phalke; 23 December 2003 (age 22) Asu, Satara, Maharashtra, India

Sport
- Sport: Field hockey
- Position: Midfielder
Senior career
| Years | Team | Caps | Goals |
| – | Hockey Maharashtra | - | - |
| – | Income Tax | - | - |
| 2025– | Soorma Hockey Club | - | - |
National team
| Years | Team | Caps | Goals |
| 2022–2024 | India U21 | 18 | (4) |
| 2022– | India Hockey5s | 4 | (1) |
| 2023– | India | 69 | (9) |
Medal record
Women's field hockey
Representing India
Asian Games
| Bronze medal – third place | 2022 Hangzhou | Team |
Asia Cup
| Silver medal – second place | 2025 Hangzhou |
Asian Champions Trophy
| Gold medal – first place | 2024 Rajgir |
Junior Asia Cup
| Gold medal – first place | 2023 Japan |
| Gold medal – first place | 2024 Muscat |

Vaishnavi Vitthal Phalke (born 23 December 2003) is an Indian field hockey player and member of Indian women hockey team. She plays for Hockey Maharashtra in the domestic hockey tournaments. She plays as a defender.

== Early life ==
Vaishnavi comes from a farmers' family in the small village of Asu in Satara district, Maharashtra. Her father was also a wrestler. She learnt her basics at the Government Sports Academy in Pune. Her father who never won a tournament as wrestler, wanted her daughter to become a good player. He sent her to Shree Shiv Chhatrapati Sports Complex, Balewadi, Pune in 2011. Vaishnavi tried different games before choosing hockey.

== Hockey career ==
In 2017, she played her first big tournament taking part in the 7th Hockey India Sub-Junior Women's National Championship held in Ramanathapuram.

In 2019, after a good performance at the 9th Hockey India Junior Women National Championship (A Division) at Kollam, Kerala, she was picked up for the Junior India camp. Then, she took part in the 2021 Women's FIH Hockey Junior World Cup, Potchefstroom, South Africa where India finished fourth. She was part of the junior team that won the Junior Asia Cup in Kakamigahara, Gifu prefecture, Japan.

She was called for the Senior India camp in September 2022. Later, she made her senior India debut in the South Africa tour in January 2023. She was named as the captain of the junior India team for the under-23 5-Nations Tournament in Dublin, Ireland in July 2022. She was part of the Indian team that won the biennial six-nation 2023 Women's Asian Champions Trophy.
