= Hiroka Murayama =

Japanese field hockey player

Personal information
- Born: 13 January 2003 (age 23) Tochigi, Japan
- Height: 157 cm (5 ft 2 in)
- Weight: 51 kg (112 lb)

Sport
- Sport: Field hockey
- Position: Forward
- Club: Tenri University
National team
Years	Team	Caps	Goals
2023	Japan U–21	15	(3)
2024–	Japan	0	(0)
Medal record
Women's field hockey
Representing Japan
Asian Cup
Bronze medal – third place	2025 Hangzhou
Asian Champions Trophy
Bronze medal – third place	2024 Rajgir
Junior Asian Cup
Bronze medal – third place	2023 Kakamigahara

Hiroka Murayama (村山 裕香, born 13 January 2003) is a field hockey player from Japan.

== Personal life ==
Hiroka Murayama was born on 13 January 2003, in Tochigi.

== Career ==
=== Domestic league ===
In the Japanese national league, Murayama represents Tenri University.

=== Under–21 ===
Murayama made her junior international debut in 2023. She made her first appearances for the Japanese U–21 team during a test series against Australia in the Gold Coast. She went on to represent Japan again at the Junior Asian Cup in Kakamigahara, winning a bronze medal. To close out 2023, Murayama represented Japan again at the FIH Junior World Cup in Santiago, concluding the tournament with a seventh-place finish.

=== Cherry Blossoms ===
In 2024, Murayama was named in the senior national team for the first time. She will make her international debut at the Asian Champions Trophy in Rajgir.
