= Lee Yu-jin (field hockey) =

South Korean field hockey player (born 2002)

Personal information
- Born: 30 September 2002 (age 23) South Korea

Sport
- Sport: Field hockey
- Position: Defence
- Club: Korea National Sport University
National team
Years	Team	Caps	Goals
2022–2023	South Korea U–21	18	(3)
2022–	South Korea	14	(2)
Medal record
Women's field hockey
Representing South Korea
Junior Asian Cup
Silver medal – second place	2023 Kakamigahara

Lee Yu-jin (이유진, born 30 September 2002) is a field hockey player from South Korea.

== Career ==
=== Under–21 ===
Lee made her debut South Korea at Under–21 level. She was a member of the national team at the 2022 FIH Junior World Cup in Potchefstroom.

She represented the team again in 2023. She competed at the Junior Asian Cup in Kakamigahara and the FIH Junior World Cup in Santiago, winning silver at the former.

=== Senior national team ===
Lee made her senior international debut in 2022, making her first appearance at the FIH Nations Cup in Valencia.

In 2023 she appeared at the Asian Champions Trophy in Ranchi. She has also been named in the squad for the 2024 FIH Olympic Qualifiers in Valencia.
