= Sunelita Toppo =

Indian field hockey player (born 2007)

Personal information
- Born: 11 April 2007 (age 19) Kukuda, Sundergarh, Orissa, India

Sport
- Sport: Field hockey
- Position: Midfielder
Senior career
Years	Team	Caps	Goals
–	Hockey Association of Odisha	-	-
2025–	Delhi SG Pipers	-	-
National team
Years	Team	Caps	Goals
2023–25	India U21	28	(9)
2024–	India	67	(11)
Medal record
Women's field hockey
Representing India
Asian Games
Gold medal – first place	2026 Aichi–Nagoya	Team
Asia Cup
Silver medal – second place	2025 Hangzhou
Asian Champions Trophy
Gold medal – first place	2024 Rajgir
Junior Asia Cup
Gold medal – first place	2023 Japan
Gold medal – first place	2024 Muscat

Sunelita Toppo (born 11 April 2007) is an Indian field hockey player who plays as a forward for the national team. She made her senior debut at the Pro League against China in Bhubaneswar in February 2024.

== Personal life ==
Sunelita hails from Kukuda village in Rajgangpur Block of Sundergarh district in Odisha. Her father Suresh Toppo is a farmer and her mother, Nelisunita Toppo, is a housewife. She says, she is inspired by her aunt Anupa Barla, who also played Junior World Cup for India. She is a product of the Sports Authority of India Training Centre, Sundergarh, which is considered as a cradle of budding hockey stars in India. Initially, she started to play hockey at the age of 8, with bamboo sticks.

== Career ==
Sunelita represented Odisha in the National Games at Gujarat in 2022 and caught the eye of the selectors after an impressive performance. She made her junior India debut in February 2023 during the four-match South Africa tour and within a year she got the senior cap. She started as a mid-fielder but soon switched to forward line. Later in June 2023, she was part of the Indian junior team that won the Junior Asia Cup in Japan. She was also part of the junior India team that played the 4-nation invitational tournament in Düsseldorf, Germany in August 2023 and the Junior World Cup in Santiago, Chile in December 2023. She also played for the senior team that won the gold medal at the Bihar Women's Asian Champions Trophy held in Rajgir in 2024.
