= Deepika Soreng =

Indian field hockey player (born 2003)

Personal information
- Born: 17 December 2003 (age 22) Jharkhand, India

Sport
- Sport: Field hockey
- Position: Forward
Senior career
Years	Team	Caps	Goals
–	Hockey Jharkhand	-	-
–	Railways	-	-
2025–	Soorma Hockey Club	-	-
National team
Years	Team	Caps	Goals
2023	India U21		-
2022–	India	12	(1)
Medal record
Women's field hockey
Representing India
Asian Games
Gold medal – first place	2026 Aichi–Nagoya	Team
Junior Asia Cup
Gold medal – first place	2023 Japan

Deepika Soreng (born 17 December 2003) is an Indian field hockey player from Jharkhand. She made her senior India debut in 2024 in the FIH Hockey Pro League 2023–24. She plays as a forward for Railway Sports Promotion Board and Hockey Jharkhand in the domestic tournaments and for Soorma Hockey Club in the Hero Hockey India League 2024.

== Career ==
Soreng made her junior India debut in women's Junior Asia Cup in June 2023 at Kakamigahara, Japan. She scored seven goals in six matches and became the second highest goal scorer of the tournament which India won. In 2023, she also took part in the 4 Nations Junior Women Invitational tournament at Düsseldorf. She was part of the Indian junior team that played the Junior World Cup in 2023 at Santiago. In 2024, she played the FIH Hockey5s World Cup at Oman where India won the silver medal.

== Awards ==
- 2023: Asunta Lakra Award for Upcoming Player of the Year 2023.
