= Field hockey at the 2026 Asian Games =

- Venues: Kawasaki Juko Stadium
- Location: Kakamigahara, Gifu Prefecture, Japan
- Dates: 18 September – 3 October 2026
- Nations: 15
- Teams: 24 (12 men, 12 women)

Champions
- Men: India
- Women: India

The field hockey tournaments at the 2026 Asian Games was held between 18 September and 3 October 2026 at the Kawasaki Juko Stadium in Kakamigahara, Gifu Prefecture, Japan. A total of twelve men's teams and twelve women's teams competed in their respective tournaments. It was the sport's consecutive eighteenth appearance at the Games, since the 1958 edition. India men's and India women's teams won the men's and women's team events, respectively. This marked the first time India had won both events in a single edition

The event also served as the Asian qualifiers for the 2028 Summer Olympics, with the winner of both competitions directly qualified for the main tournament, while the next top five men's and four women's teams will play the 2028 Summer Olympic Qualifiers.

== Schedule ==
The schedule is as follows:

P	Preliminary round	½	Semi-finals	B	Bronze medal match	F	Gold medal match

Date Event	September													October				
Date Event	Fri 18	Sat 19	Sun 20	Mon 21	Tue 22	Wed 23	Thu 24	Fri 25	Sat 26	Sun 27	Mon 28	Tue 29	Wed 30	Thu 1	Fri 2		Sat 3	
Men	P	—N/a	P	—N/a	P	—N/a	P	—N/a	P	—N/a	P	—N/a		½	—N/a		B	F
Women	P	—N/a	P	P	—N/a	P	—N/a	P	—N/a	P	—N/a		½	—N/a	B	F	—N/a	

== Venue ==
For ticketing information and directions to the venue, see

Kakamigahara	Field hockey at the 2026 Asian Games is located in Central Japan
Kawasaki Juko Stadium	Field hockey at the 2026 Asian Games is located in Central Japan
Capacity: 1,630	Field hockey at the 2026 Asian Games is located in Central Japan

== Qualification ==
Japan automatically qualified for both tournaments as the hosts. The five highest-ranked teams, other than Japan, from the 2022 Asian Games qualified directly for this edition, while other teams did so through the Asian Games Qualifiers. The men's qualifiers, earlier scheduled to be held in Muscat, Oman, were shifted to Bangkok, Thailand due to the 2026 Iran war. The women's qualifiers were held in Jakarta, Indonesia.

Nation	Men's	Women's
Bangladesh	Yes	Yes
China	Yes	Yes
Chinese Taipei	—N/a	Yes
India	Yes	Yes
Indonesia	Yes	Yes
Japan	Yes	Yes
Kazakhstan	—N/a	Yes
Malaysia	Yes	Yes
Oman	Yes	—N/a
Pakistan	Yes	—N/a
Singapore	—N/a	Yes
South Korea	Yes	Yes
Sri Lanka	Yes	—N/a
Thailand	Yes	Yes
Uzbekistan	Yes	Yes
Total: 15 NOCs	12/12	12/12

=== Men's qualification ===
Mode of Qualification	Date	Hosts	Berths	Qualified teams
Host country	25 September 2016	—N/a	1	Japan
2022 Asian Games	24 September – 6 October 2023	(China) Hangzhou	5	China; India; Malaysia; Pakistan; South Korea
2026 Asian Games Qualifier	2 April – 10 April 2026	(Thailand) Bangkok	6	Bangladesh; ~~Chinese Taipei~~; Indonesia; Oman; Sri Lanka; Uzbekistan; Thailand
Total			12	

=== Women's qualification ===
Mode of Qualification	Date	Hosts	Berths	Qualified teams
Host nation	25 September 2016	—N/a	1	Japan
2022 Asian Games	25 September – 7 October 2023	(China) Hangzhou	5	China; India; Malaysia; South Korea; Thailand
2026 Asian Games Qualifier	23 April – 29 April 2026	(Indonesia) Jakarta	6	Chinese Taipei; Bangladesh; Indonesia; Kazakhstan; Singapore; Uzbekistan
Total			12	

== Men's tournament ==
=== Pool A ===
Pos	Team	Pld	W	D	L	GF	GA	GD	Pts	Qualification
1	India	5	5	0	0	49	4	+45	15	Semi-finals
2	South Korea	5	4	0	1	20	10	+10	12	Semi-finals
3	Japan (H)	5	3	0	2	29	7	+22	9	Fifth place classification
4	Bangladesh	5	2	0	3	9	23	−14	6	Fifth place classification
5	Sri Lanka	5	1	0	4	6	38	−32	3	Ninth place game
6	Indonesia	5	0	0	5	6	37	−31	0	Eleventh place game

Source: FIH
Rules for classification: 1) points; 2) matches won; 3) goal difference; 4) goals for; 5) head-to-head result; 6) field goals for.
(H) Hosts

=== Pool B ===
Pos	Team	Pld	W	D	L	GF	GA	GD	Pts	Qualification
1	Malaysia	5	5	0	0	34	4	+30	15	Semi-finals
2	Pakistan	5	4	0	1	28	8	+20	12	Semi-finals
3	China	5	3	0	2	13	10	+3	9	Fifth place classification
4	Thailand	5	2	0	3	5	28	−23	6	Fifth place classification
5	Uzbekistan	5	1	0	4	6	20	−14	3	Ninth place game
6	Oman	5	0	0	5	4	20	−16	0	Eleventh place game

Source: FIH
Rules for classification: 1) points; 2) matches won; 3) goal difference; 4) goals for; 5) head-to-head result; 6) field goals for.

=== Medal round ===
Semi-finals
1 October
India	4
Pakistan	3
1 October
Malaysia	2
South Korea	1

Gold medal match
3 October
India	5
Malaysia	1
Bronze medal match
3 October
Pakistan	5
South Korea	3

== Women's tournament ==
=== Pool A ===
Pos	Team	Pld	W	D	L	GF	GA	GD	Pts	Qualification
1	China	5	5	0	0	46	0	+46	15	Semi-finals
2	South Korea	5	4	0	1	20	5	+15	12	Semi-finals
3	Malaysia	5	3	0	2	14	7	+7	9	Fifth place classification
4	Chinese Taipei	5	2	0	3	8	21	−13	6	Fifth place classification
5	Bangladesh	5	0	1	4	6	30	−24	1	Ninth place game
6	Kazakhstan	5	0	1	4	4	35	−31	1	Eleventh place game

Source: FIH
Rules for classification: 1) points; 2) matches won; 3) goal difference; 4) goals for; 5) head-to-head result; 6) field goals for.

=== Pool B ===
Pos	Team	Pld	W	D	L	GF	GA	GD	Pts	Qualification
1	India	5	5	0	0	66	3	+63	15	Semi-finals
2	Japan (H)	5	4	0	1	23	4	+19	12	Semi-finals
3	Thailand	5	2	0	3	6	25	−19	6	Fifth place classification
4	Indonesia	5	2	0	3	6	27	−21	6	Fifth place classification
5	Singapore	5	1	0	4	4	18	−14	3	Ninth place game
6	Uzbekistan	5	1	0	4	5	33	−28	3	Eleventh place game

Source: FIH
Rules for classification: 1) points; 2) matches won; 3) goal difference; 4) goals for; 5) head-to-head result; 6) field goals for.
(H) Hosts

=== Medal round ===
Semi-finals
30 September
China (s.o.)	0 (4)
Japan	0 (2)
30 September
India	2
South Korea	0

Gold medal match
2 October
China	0
India	1
Bronze medal match
2 October
Japan (s.o.)	0 (4)
South Korea	0 (2)

== Medal summary ==
=== Medal table ===
* Host nation (Japan)

Rank	Nation	Gold	Silver	Bronze	Total
1	India	2	0	0	2
2	China	0	1	0	1
2	Malaysia	0	1	0	1
4	Japan*	0	0	1	1
4	Pakistan	0	0	1	1
Totals (5 entries)		2	2	2	6

=== Medalists ===
Event	Gold	Silver	Bronze
Men's team	India; Jarmanpreet Singh; Abhishek; Manpreet Singh; Hardik Singh; Dilpreet Singh; Mandeep Singh; Harmanpreet Singh; Sumit; Nilakanta Sharma; Raj Kumar Pal; Mohith Shashikumar Honnenahalli; Amit Rohidas; Jugraj Singh; Vivek Sagar Prasad; Sukhjeet Singh; Yashdeep Siwach; Sanjay; Suraj Karkera; Rajinder Singh; Shilanand Lakra	Malaysia; Marhan Jalil; Fitri Saari; Faizal Saari; Akhimullah Anuar; Shello Silverius; Zaimi Mat Deris; Faiz Jali; Ashran Hamsani; Hafizuddin Othman; Norsyafiq Sumantri; Abu Kamal Azrai; Aiman Rozemi; Muhajir Abdu Rauf; Shafiq Hassan; Amirul Azahar; Faris Harizan; Azimuddin Kamaruddin; Aminuddin Mohd Zain; Andywalfian Jeffrynus; Nur Aqilrullah Che	Pakistan; Waqar Ali; Muhammad Abdullah; Sufyan Khan; Moin Shakeel; Waheed Rana; Hannan Shahid; Zikriya Hayat; Arshad Liaqat; Adeel Latif; Ahmad Nadeem; Ghazanfar Ali; Ammad Butt; Muhammad Hammadudin; Abdul Rehman; Afraz Hakeem; Umar Mustafa; Abu Mahmood; Ali Raza; Abdul Manan; Muhammad Ammad
Women's team	India; Ishika Chaudhary; Nikki Pradhan; Bichu Devi; Savita Punia; Shilpi Dabas; Lalremsiami Hmarzote; Deepika Soreng; Baljeet Kaur; Ishika; Jyoti Rumavat; Navneet Kaur; Sushila Chanu; Sunelita Toppo; Salima Tete; Neha Goyal; Rutuja Pisal; Lalthantluangi; Sakshi Rana; Beauty Dungdung; Deepika Sehrawat	China; Yang Liu; Zhang Ying; Chen Yi; Ma Ning; Zhong Jiaqi; Dan Wen; Li Hong; Ou Zixia; Peng Yang; Zou Meirong; He Jiangxin; Fan Yunxia; Chen Yang; Liu Ping; Tan Jinzhuang; Liu Chencheng; Li Ting; Chen Tong; Yu Anhui; Luo Yaxi	Japan; Akio Tanaka; Miyu Suzuki; Ikumi Matsu; Hanami Saito; Nanako Tateiwa; Emi Nishikori; Mayuri Horikawa; Shiho Kobayakawa; Mai Toriyama; Amiru Shimada; Akari Nakagomi; Hiroka Murayama; Saki Tanaka; Miyu Hasegawa; Yu Kudo; Maho Ueno; Rui Takashima; Maho Segawa; Haruka Kawaguchi; Nanami Kaneko
