= Bangladesh women's national field hockey team =

Bangladesh
- Association: Bangladesh Hockey Federation
- Confederation: AHF (Asia)
- Head Coach: Tariquzzaman Nannu
- Assistant coach(es): Hedayatul Islam Rajib and Shahidullah Titu
- Captain: Ritu Khanom and Riya Akter Sharna

FIH ranking
- Current: 85 (1 October 2026)

First international
- Bangladesh 2–0 Sri Lanka (Singapore City, Singapore; 11 September 2019)

Biggest win
- Bangladesh 2–0 Sri Lanka (Singapore City, Singapore; 11 September 2019)

Biggest defeat
- Bangladesh 0–6 China (Singapore City, Singapore; 13 September 2019)

Asian Games
- Appearances: 1 (first in 2026)
- Best result: 9th (2026)

Asia Cup
- Appearances: 0 (first in 0)

The Bangladesh women's national field hockey team represents Bangladesh in women's international field hockey competitions, and it's controlled by the Bangladesh Hockey Federation (BHF).

== History ==
Bangladesh Hockey Federation (BHF) was founded in 1972, while the country's first hockey stadium — Maulana Bhasani Hockey Stadium — was built in Dhaka in 1987.

The Bangladesh men's hockey team started their journey in international hockey by participating in the 1st Junior World Cup for the Asia/Oceania zone qualifying round in Kuala Lumpur in 1977, while the recently concluded Women's Juniors (U-21) AHF Cup Hockey Qualifiers was the first international tournament for the Bangladesh women's hockey team.

== Competitive records ==
=== Olympic Games ===
Summer Olympics records
Year	Round	Position	GP	W	D	L	GF	GA
(United Kingdom) 1908	Did not include women's hockey							
(Belgium) 1920	Did not include women's hockey							
(Netherlands) 1928	Did not include women's hockey							
(United States) 1932	Did not include women's hockey							
(Germany) 1936	Did not include women's hockey							
(United Kingdom) 1948	Did not include women's hockey							
(Finland) 1952	Did not include women's hockey							
(Australia) 1956	Did not include women's hockey							
(Italy) 1960	Did not include women's hockey							
(Japan) 1964	Did not include women's hockey							
(Mexico) 1968	Did not include women's hockey							
(Germany) 1972	Did not include women's hockey							
(Canada) 1976	Did not include women's hockey							
(Soviet Union) 1980	Did not participate							
(United States) 1984	Did not participate							
(South Korea) 1988	Did not participate							
(Spain) 1992	Did not participate							
(United States) 1996	Did not participate							
(Australia) 2000	Did not participate							
(Greece) 2004	Did not participate							
(China) 2008	Did not participate							
(United Kingdom) 2012	Did not participate							
(Brazil) 2016	Did not participate							
(Japan) 2020	Did not participate							
(France) 2024	Did not participate							
(United States) 2028	To be determined							
Total	0/12	0 Titles	0	0	0	0	0	0

=== World Cup ===
World Cup records
Year	Round	Position	GP	W	D	L	GF	GA
(France) 1974	Did not qualify							
(Germany) 1976	Did not qualify							
(Spain) 1978	Did not qualify							
(Argentina) 1981	Did not qualify							
(Malaysia) 1983	Did not qualify							
(Netherlands) 1986	Did not qualify							
(Australia) 1990	Did not qualify							
(Republic of Ireland) 1994	Did not qualify							
(Netherlands) 1998	Did not qualify							
(Australia) 2002	Did not qualify							
(Spain) 2006	Did not qualify							
(Argentina) 2010	Did not qualify							
(Netherlands) 2014	Did not qualify							
(England) 2018	Did not qualify							
(Spain) (Netherlands) 2022	Did not qualify							
(Netherlands) (Belgium) 2026	Did not qualify							
Total	0/16	0 Titles	0	0	0	0	0	0

=== Women's AHF Cup ===
Women's AHF Cup records
Year	Round	Position	GP	W	D	L	GF	GA
(Singapore) 1997	Did not participate							
(Singapore) 2003	Did not participate							
(Sri Lanka) 2008	Did not participate							
(Singapore) 2012	Did not participate							
(Thailand) 2016	Did not participate							
(Indonesia) 2025	Did not participate							
Total	0/6	0 Titles	0	0	0	0	0	0

=== Women's Asian Champions Trophy ===
Asian Champions Trophy records
Year	Round	Position	GP	W	D	L	GF	GA
(South Korea) 2010	Did not participate							
(China) 2011	Did not participate							
(Japan) 2013	Did not participate							
(Singapore) 2016	Did not participate							
(South Korea) 2018	Did not participate							
(South Korea) 2021	Did not participate							
(India) 2023	Did not participate							
(India) 2024	Did not participate							
Total	0/8	0 Titles	0	0	0	0	0	0

=== Asian Games ===
Asian Games records
Year	Round	Position	GP	W	D	L	GF	GA
(India) 1982	Did not participate							
(South Korea) 1986	Did not participate							
(China) 1990	Did not participate							
(Japan) 1994	Did not participate							
(Thailand) 1998	Did not participate							
(South Korea) 2002	Did not participate							
(Qatar) 2006	Did not participate							
(China) 2010	Did not participate							
(South Korea) 2014	Did not participate							
(Indonesia) 2018	Did not participate							
(China) 2022	Did not participate							
(Japan) 2026	Group stage	9th	6	0	2	4	7	31
(Qatar) 2030	To be determined							
(Saudi Arabia) 2034	To be determined							
Total	1/12	9th	6	0	2	4	7	31

=== Asian Games Qualifiers ===
Asian Games Qualifiers records
Year	Round	Position	GP	W	D	L	GF	GA
(Thailand) 2018	Did not participate							
(Indonesia) 2022	Did not participate							
(Indonesia) 2026	Qualified; Runners-up	2/8	5	3	1	1	14	12
Total	1/3	0 Title	5	3	1	1	14	12

== Results and fixtures ==
The following is a list of match results in the last 12 months, as well as any future matches that have been scheduled.

Win Draw Loss Fixture

=== 2026 ===
==== 2026 Asian Games Women's Qualifier ====
23 April 2026 Pool A	Chinese Taipei	5–5	Bangladesh	Jakarta, Indonesia
17:30 BST (UTC+6)	Zhu 9'; Liao 23'; Fan 29'; Huang 34', 36'	Report	Riya 8'; Pal 10', 17', 44'; Akter 40'	Stadium: GBK Hockey Field

24 April 2026 Pool A	Uzbekistan	2–3	Bangladesh	Jakarta, Indonesia
12:30 BST (UTC+6)	Khujaeva 12'; Khaydarova 46'	Report	Rimon 11'; Akter 24'; Riya 40'	Stadium: GBK Hockey Field

26 April 2026 Pool A	Hong Kong	1–2	Bangladesh	Jakarta, Indonesia
17:30 BST (UTC+6)	Law 1'	Report	Nadira 10'; Akter 39'	Stadium: GBK Hockey Field

28 April 2026 SF	Bangladesh	3–1	Singapore	Jakarta, Indonesia
19:00 BST (UTC+6)	Riya 8', 57', 58'	Report	Cheryll 12'	Stadium: GBK Hockey Field

29 April 2026 GM	Bangladesh	1–3	Chinese Taipei	Jakarta, Indonesia
19:00 BST (UTC+6)	Pal 8'	Report	Wang 17'; Mao 32'; Huang 40'	Stadium: GBK Hockey Field

==== 2026 Asian Games ====
20 September 2026 Pool A	China	13–0	Bangladesh	Kakamigahara, Japan
09:00	Zhong 4', 13', 29'; Chen 12', 18'; Li 13'; Zhang 27'; Ma 32'; Yang 36'; Zou 38', 51'; Chen 41', 57'	Report		Stadium: Gifu Prefectural Green Stadium

21 September 2026 Pool A	Bangladesh	1–3	Malaysia	Kakamigahara, Japan
19:00	Akter 25'	Report	Zulkifli 40', 59'; Muhamad 44'	Stadium: Gifu Prefectural Green Stadium

23 September 2026 Pool A	Bangladesh	0–8	South Korea	Kakamigahara, Japan
09:00		Report	Choi 5', 19'; Park Seu. 12', 15', 23', 60'; Park Mi. 28'; Kim Seo. 34'	Stadium: Gifu Prefectural Green Stadium

25 September 2026 Pool A	Kazakhstan	3–3	Bangladesh	Kakamigahara, Japan
09:00	Lobanova 21', 32', 37'	Report	Riya 2'; Akter 40'; Pal 47'	Stadium: Gifu Prefectural Green Stadium

27 September 2026 Pool A	Chinese Taipei	3–2	Bangladesh	Kakamigahara, Japan
13:00	Huang 6', 49'; Wang Y. 45'	Report	Akter 19', 24'	Stadium: Gifu Prefectural Green Stadium

2 October 2026 9th place match	Bangladesh	1–1 (2–1 p)	Singapore	Kakamigahara, Japan
09:00	Riya 10'	Report	Toh 44'	Stadium: Gifu Prefectural Green Stadium
	Penalties
	Khatun (penalty shoot-out missed); Riya (penalty shoot-out missed); Ratry (penalty shoot-out scored); Ema (penalty shoot-out scored)		(penalty shoot-out missed) S. Ng; (penalty shoot-out missed) Ho; (penalty shoot-out scored) S. Ng; (penalty shoot-out missed) Sim; (penalty shoot-out missed) Chia

== Current squad ==
The following is the Bangladesh roster in the women's field hockey tournament of the 2026 Asian Games.

Head coach: (Bangladesh) Zahid Hossain

1. Mohua (GK)
2. Neeladri Neel
3. Mst Annika
4. Ritu Akter
5. Ninisen Rakhain
6. Sanjida Moni
7. Sharika Rimon
8. Riyasha Rishi
9. Nadira
10. Orpita Pal (C)
11. Fardia Ratry
12. Airin Riya
13. Mst Lima
14. Mst Khatun
15. Kona Akter
16. Nadira Ema
17. Fatema Tuzzohora
18. Heemadri Sukh (GK)

== See also ==
- Bangladesh women's national under-21 field hockey team
- Bangladesh men's national under-21 field hockey team
- Bangladesh men's national field hockey team
