= Field hockey at the 2026 Asian Games – Women's tournament =

Women's field hockey at the 2026 Asian Games

Tournament details
- Host country: Japan
- City: Kakamigahara
- Dates: 18 September – 2 October 2026
- Teams: 12 (from 1 confederation)
- Venue: Kawasaki Juko Stadium

Final positions
- Champions: India (2nd title)
- Runner-up: China
- Third place: Japan

Tournament statistics
- Matches played: 40
- Goals scored: 227 (5.68 per match)
- Top scorer: (India) Deepika Sehrawat (21 goals)

The women's field hockey tournament at the 2026 Asian Games was the 12th edition of the field hockey event for women at the Asian Games. It was held alongside the men's tournament at the Kawasaki Juko Stadium, also known as Gifu Prefectural Green Stadium, in Kakamigahara, Japan from 18 September to 2 October 2026.

China were the defending champions. India defeated China and won their second gold after 44 years, securing the direct qualification to the 2028 Summer Olympics.

Japan clinched the bronze after edging South Korea in the shoot-out following a goalless draw.

Lalremsiami, who played her 200th match for India in the gold medal match against China, struck a reverse-hit goal to secure a 1–0 championship victory, which was sealed by Savita Punia's penalty stroke block against Zhang Ying.

== Venue ==
For ticketing information and directions to the venue, see

(Japan) Kakamigahara
Kawasaki Juko Stadium
Capacity: 1,630
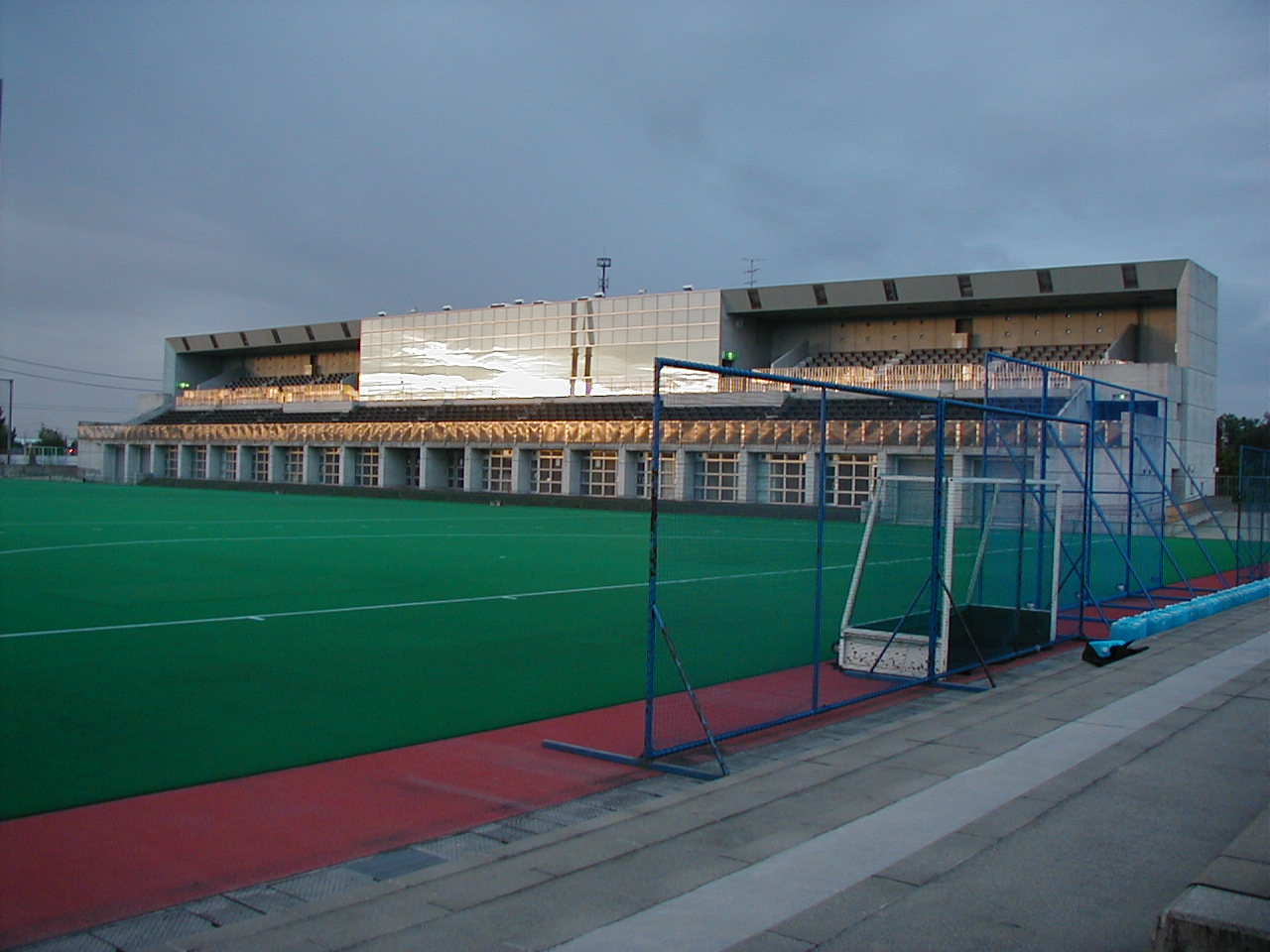

== Qualification ==
Bangladesh qualified to the Games for the first time, after finishing second in the qualifier.

| Mode of Qualification | Date | Hosts | Berths | Qualified teams |
|---|---|---|---|---|
| Host nation | 25 September 2016 | —N/a | 1 | Japan |
| 2022 Asian Games | 25 September – 7 October 2023 | (China) Hangzhou | 5 | China; India; Malaysia; South Korea; Thailand |
| 2026 Asian Games Qualifier | 23 April – 29 April 2026 | (Indonesia) Jakarta | 6 | Chinese Taipei; Bangladesh; Indonesia; Kazakhstan; Singapore; Uzbekistan |
| Total | | | 12 | |

== Preliminary round ==
All times are local (UTC+9)

=== Pool A ===
| Pos | Team | Pld | W | D | L | GF | GA | GD | Pts | Qualification |
|---|---|---|---|---|---|---|---|---|---|---|
| 1 | China | 5 | 5 | 0 | 0 | 46 | 0 | +46 | 15 | Semi-finals |
| 2 | South Korea | 5 | 4 | 0 | 1 | 20 | 5 | +15 | 12 | Semi-finals |
| 3 | Malaysia | 5 | 3 | 0 | 2 | 14 | 7 | +7 | 9 | Fifth place classification |
| 4 | Chinese Taipei | 5 | 2 | 0 | 3 | 8 | 21 | −13 | 6 | Fifth place classification |
| 5 | Bangladesh | 5 | 0 | 1 | 4 | 6 | 30 | −24 | 1 | Ninth place game |
| 6 | Kazakhstan | 5 | 0 | 1 | 4 | 4 | 35 | −31 | 1 | Eleventh place game |

Source: FIH
Rules for classification: 1) points; 2) matches won; 3) goal difference; 4) goals for; 5) head-to-head result; 6) field goals for.

18 September 2026
13:00

| South Korea | 3–1 | Chinese Taipei |
|---|---|---|
| Park Seu. 13', 33'; An 42' | Report | Wang W. 41' |

Gifu Prefectural Green Stadium
Umpires:
Binish Hayat (PAK)
Aleisha Neumann (AUS)

18 September 2026
19:00

| Malaysia | 5–0 | Kazakhstan |
|---|---|---|
| Zulkifli 9', 21'; Mohd 12'; Azhar 17', 49' | Report |

Gifu Prefectural Green Stadium
Umpires:
Liu Xiaoying (CHN)
Rama Potnis (IND)

20 September 2026
09:00

| China | 13–0 | Bangladesh |
|---|---|---|
| Zhong 4', 13', 29'; Chen Ya. 12', 18'; Li H. 13'; Zhang 27'; Ma 32'; Yang 36'; Zou 38', 51'; Chen Yi 41', 57' | Report |

Gifu Prefectural Green Stadium
Umpires:
Cookie Tan (SGP)
Shahiela Johari (MAS)

21 September 2026
09:00

| South Korea | 7–0 | Kazakhstan |
|---|---|---|
| Park Mi. 1'; An 28'; Kim J. 29'; L. Yu-ri 31'; Choi 39'; Park Seu. 39'; Jung 40' | Report |

Gifu Prefectural Green Stadium
Umpires:
Rinky See (HKG)
Valerie Koh (SGP)

21 September 2026
11:00

| China | 10–0 | Chinese Taipei |
|---|---|---|
| Chen Yi 7', 32', 32'; Zhong 23', 34'; Zhang 39'; Ma 54'; Fan 55'; Chen Ya. 57'; Yu 58' | Report |

Gifu Prefectural Green Stadium
Umpires:
Rama Potnis (IND)
Laurine Delforge (BEL)

21 September 2026
19:00

| Bangladesh | 1–3 | Malaysia |
|---|---|---|
| Akter 25' | Report | Zulkifli 40', 59'; Muhamad 44' |

Gifu Prefectural Green Stadium
Umpires:
Yu Tian (CHN)
Kim Yoon-seon (KOR)

23 September 2026
09:00

| Bangladesh | 0–8 | South Korea |
|---|---|---|
| | Report | Choi 5', 19'; Park Seu. 12', 15', 23', 60'; Park Mi. 28'; Kim Seo. 34' |

Gifu Prefectural Green Stadium
Umpires:
Emi Yamada (JPN)
Zhou Fuyi (CHN)

23 September 2026
13:00

| Kazakhstan | 1–4 | Chinese Taipei |
|---|---|---|
| Lobanova 31' | Report | Huang 5', 60'; Fan 32'; Wang Y. 58' |

Gifu Prefectural Green Stadium
Umpires:
Kelly Hudson (NZL)
Yu Tian (CHN)

23 September 2026
19:00

| Malaysia | 0–4 | China |
|---|---|---|
| | Report | Yu 2'; Zhong 25', 44'; Zhang 47' |

Gifu Prefectural Green Stadium
Umpires:
Daulet Urmanov (KAZ)
Aleisha Neumann (AUS)

25 September 2026
09:00

| Kazakhstan | 3–3 | Bangladesh |
|---|---|---|
| Lobanova 21', 32', 37' | Report | Riya 2'; Akter 40'; Pal 47' |

Gifu Prefectural Green Stadium
Umpires:
Shahiela Johari (MAS)
Kelly Hudson (NZL)

25 September 2026
13:00

| South Korea | 0–3 | China |
|---|---|---|
| | Report | Zhang 40'; Liu 46'; Chen Ya. 60' |

Gifu Prefectural Green Stadium
Umpires:
Cookie Tan (SGP)
Laurine Delforge (BEL)

25 September 2026
19:00

| Chinese Taipei | 0–5 | Malaysia |
|---|---|---|
| | Report | Mohd 9'; Shaikh 10'; Zulkifli 12'; Husain 15+', 50' |

Gifu Prefectural Green Stadium
Umpires:
Liu Xiaoying (CHN)
Zarina Ilyassova (KAZ)

27 September 2026
09:00

| China | 16–0 | Kazakhstan |
|---|---|---|
| Yu 8', 28', 29'; Chen Ya. 16'; Zhang 23', 24', 24'; Zhong 23', 27'; Dan 44', 49'; Chen Yi 51', 59'; Li H. 56'; Zou 57'; Fan 58' | Report |

Gifu Prefectural Green Stadium
Umpires:
Emi Yamada (JPN)
Binish Hayat (PAK)

27 September 2026
13:00

| Chinese Taipei | 3–2 | Bangladesh |
|---|---|---|
| Huang 6', 49'; Wang Y. 45' | Report | Akter 19', 24' |

Gifu Prefectural Green Stadium
Umpires:
Yu Tian (CHN)
Rinky See (HKG)

27 September 2026
15:00

| Malaysia | 1–2 | South Korea |
|---|---|---|
| Syafi 60' | Report | Park Seu. 15+'; An 29' |

Gifu Prefectural Green Stadium
Umpires:
Aleisha Neumann (AUS)
Liu Xiaoying (CHN)

=== Pool B ===
| Pos | Team | Pld | W | D | L | GF | GA | GD | Pts | Qualification |
|---|---|---|---|---|---|---|---|---|---|---|
| 1 | India | 5 | 5 | 0 | 0 | 66 | 3 | +63 | 15 | Semi-finals |
| 2 | Japan (H) | 5 | 4 | 0 | 1 | 23 | 4 | +19 | 12 | Semi-finals |
| 3 | Thailand | 5 | 2 | 0 | 3 | 6 | 25 | −19 | 6 | Fifth place classification |
| 4 | Indonesia | 5 | 2 | 0 | 3 | 6 | 27 | −21 | 6 | Fifth place classification |
| 5 | Singapore | 5 | 1 | 0 | 4 | 4 | 18 | −14 | 3 | Ninth place game |
| 6 | Uzbekistan | 5 | 1 | 0 | 4 | 5 | 33 | −28 | 3 | Eleventh place game |

Source: FIH
Rules for classification: 1) points; 2) matches won; 3) goal difference; 4) goals for; 5) head-to-head result; 6) field goals for.
(H) Hosts

18 September 2026
15:00

| Thailand | 2–0 | Singapore |
|---|---|---|
| Komolwit 50'; Inpa 57' | Report |

Gifu Prefectural Green Stadium
Umpires:
Yu Tian (CHN)
Emi Yamada (JPN)

18 September 2026
17:00

| Japan | 7–0 | Indonesia |
|---|---|---|
| Kobayakawa 26'; Murayama 32'; Shimada 40'; Ueno 45'; Saito 47'; Suzuki 50', 57' | Report |

Gifu Prefectural Green Stadium
Umpires:
Kim Yoon-seon (KOR)
Rinky See (HKG)

20 September 2026
11:00

| India | 19–0 | Uzbekistan |
|---|---|---|
| Lalremsiami 7'; Deepika 8', 22', 25', 33', 36', 38', 41', 54'; Ishika 11', 42', 54'; Baljeet 12'; Neha 18'; Navneet 23', 45'; Lalthantluangi 43', 51'; Rana 43' | Report |

Gifu Prefectural Green Stadium
Umpires:
Valerie Koh (SGP)
Liu Yu-Chen (TPE)

21 September 2026
13:00

| India | 17–1 | Indonesia |
|---|---|---|
| Deepika 8', 28', 40'; Toppo 11', 30'; Lalremsiami 12', 16'; Pisal 15', 20', 38'; Rana 25', 57'; Tete 34'; Navneet 35', 56', 57'; Ishika 36' | Report | Aditiya 32' |

Gifu Prefectural Green Stadium
Umpires:
Shahiela Johari (MAS)
Emi Yamada (JPN)

21 September 2026
15:00

| Uzbekistan | 1–3 | Thailand |
|---|---|---|
| Khujaeva 17' | Report | Konthong 10'; Inpa 26'; Jirapitisatja 40' |

Gifu Prefectural Green Stadium
Umpires:
Zarina Ilyassova (KAZ)
Kelly Hudson (NZL)

21 September 2026
17:00

| Japan | 5–0 | Singapore |
|---|---|---|
| Murayama 23'; Toriyama 28'; Kobayakawa 29'; Hasegawa 38'; Saito 44' | Report |

Gifu Prefectural Green Stadium
Umpires:
Liu Yu-Chen (TPE)
Liu Xiaoying (CHN)

23 September 2026
11:00

| Singapore | 1–3 | Indonesia |
|---|---|---|
| S. Ng 35' | Report | Lispa 26'; Maulani 29'; Naiborhu 54' |

Gifu Prefectural Green Stadium
Umpires:
Laurine Delforge (BEL)
Binish Hayat (PAK)

23 September 2026
15:00

| Thailand | 1–20 | India |
|---|---|---|
| Samanso 57' | Report | Deepika 2', 8', 9', 24', 33', 36', 39', 51', 57'; Navneet 4', 29', 35', 51'; Pisal 10', 11', 47'; Neha 19'; Lalremsiami 26'; Rana 29'; Tete 45' |

Gifu Prefectural Green Stadium
Umpires:
Zarina Ilyassova (KAZ)
Cookie Tan (SGP)

23 September 2026
17:00

| Uzbekistan | 1–7 | Japan |
|---|---|---|
| Yubko 8' | Report | Kobayakawa 1', 38', 50'; Toriyama 15', 58'; Kawaguchi 20'; Suzuki 27' |

Gifu Prefectural Green Stadium
Umpires:
Rama Potnis (IND)
Akalanka Ishan Kumara (SRI)

25 September 2026
11:00

| Japan | 1–3 | India |
|---|---|---|
| Kobayakawa 46' | Report | Lalremsiami 5'; Ishika 30'; Navneet 36' |

Gifu Prefectural Green Stadium
Umpires:
Kim Yoon-seon (KOR)
Valerie Koh (SGP)

25 September 2026
15:00

| Indonesia | 1–0 | Thailand |
|---|---|---|
| Maulani 38' | Report |

Gifu Prefectural Green Stadium
Umpires:
Aleisha Neumann (AUS)
Liu Yu-Chen (TPE)

25 September 2026
17:00

| Singapore | 3–1 | Uzbekistan |
|---|---|---|
| Sim 39'; Chia 47'; J. Ng 48' | Report | Yubko 37' |

Gifu Prefectural Green Stadium
Umpires:
Rinky See (HKG)
Binish Hayat (PAK)

27 September 2026
11:00

| Indonesia | 1–2 | Uzbekistan |
|---|---|---|
| Maulani 58' | Report | Amrieva 3'; Semyonova 47' |

Gifu Prefectural Green Stadium
Umpires:
Valerie Koh (SGP)
Shahiela Johari (MAS)

27 September 2026
17:00

| Thailand | 0–3 | Japan |
|---|---|---|
| | Report | Nakagomi 10', 23'; Saito 54' |

Gifu Prefectural Green Stadium
Umpires:
Liu Yu-Chen (TPE)
Cookie Tan (SGP)

27 September 2026
19:00

| India | 7–0 | Singapore |
|---|---|---|
| Tete 17'; Toppo 22', 24'; Lalremsiami 26'; Pisal 29'; Pradhan 35'; Deepika 55' | Report |

Gifu Prefectural Green Stadium
Umpires:
Laurine Delforge (BEL)
Zarina Ilyassova (KAZ)

== Eleventh place game ==
All times are local (UTC+9)

30 September 2026
09:00

| Kazakhstan | 1–1 | Uzbekistan |
|---|---|---|
| Lobanova 9' | Report; SO Report | Demina 33' |
Penalties
| Gataulina (penalty shoot-out scored); Gataulina (penalty shoot-out scored); Lobanova (penalty shoot-out scored); Domashneva (penalty shoot-out scored) | 4–2 | (penalty shoot-out scored) Demina; (penalty shoot-out scored) Khaytboeva; (penalty shoot-out missed) Semyonova; (penalty shoot-out missed) Zaripova |

Gifu Prefectural Green Stadium
Umpires:
Rinky See (HKG)
Shahiela Johari (MAS)

== Ninth place game ==
All times are local (UTC+9)

2 October 2026
09:00

| Bangladesh | 1–1 | Singapore |
|---|---|---|
| Riya 10' | Report; SO Report | Toh 44' |
Penalties
| Khatun (penalty shoot-out missed); Riya (penalty shoot-out missed); Ratry (penalty shoot-out scored); Ema (penalty shoot-out scored) | 2–1 | (penalty shoot-out missed) S. Ng; (penalty shoot-out missed) Ho; (penalty shoot-out scored) S. Ng; (penalty shoot-out missed) Sim; (penalty shoot-out missed) Chia |

Gifu Prefectural Green Stadium
Umpires:
Yu Tian (CHN)
Emi Yamada (JPN)

== Fifth and seventh place classification ==
All times are local (UTC+9)

Crossover
30 September
Malaysia | 3
Indonesia | 0
30 September
Thailand | 2
Chinese Taipei | 1

Fifth place
2 October
Malaysia | 4
Thailand | 0
Seventh place
2 October
Indonesia | 1 (3)
Chinese Taipei (s.o.) | 1 (4)

=== Crossover ===
30 September 2026
11:30

| Malaysia | 3–0 | Indonesia |
|---|---|---|
| Muhamad 20'; Mohd 41', 55' | Report |

Gifu Prefectural Green Stadium
Umpires:
Valerie Koh (SGP)
Yu Tian (CHN)

30 September 2026
14:00

| Thailand | 2–1 | Chinese Taipei |
|---|---|---|
| Smeelen 13'; Inpa 47' | Report | Huang 38' |

Gifu Prefectural Green Stadium
Umpires:
Kelly Hudson (NZL)
Rama Potnis (IND)

=== Seventh place game ===
2 October 2026
11:30

| Indonesia | 1–1 | Chinese Taipei |
|---|---|---|
| Aditiya 40' | Report; SO Report | Lai 5' |
Penalties
| Lispa (penalty shoot-out missed); Rahayu (penalty shoot-out missed); Indira (penalty shoot-out scored); Prasasti (penalty shoot-out scored); Aditiya (penalty shoot-out scored); Indira (penalty shoot-out missed); Prasasti (penalty shoot-out missed) | 3–4 | (penalty shoot-out missed) Huang; (penalty shoot-out scored) Lai; (penalty shoot-out scored) Wang; (penalty shoot-out scored) Chang; (penalty shoot-out missed) Fan; (penalty shoot-out missed) Wang; (penalty shoot-out scored) Chang |

Gifu Prefectural Green Stadium
Umpires:
Rama Potnis (IND)
Cookie Tan (SGP)

=== Fifth place game ===
2 October 2026
14:00

| Malaysia | 4–0 | Thailand |
|---|---|---|
| Mohd 14', 18'; Azhar 22'; Mazlan 53' | Report |

Gifu Prefectural Green Stadium
Umpires:
Kelly Hudson (NZL)
Aleisha Neumann (AUS)

== Medal round ==
All times are local (UTC+9)

=== Bracket ===
Semi-finals
30 September
China (s.o.) | 0 (4)
Japan | 0 (2)
30 September
India | 2
South Korea | 0

Gold medal match
2 October
China | 0
India | 1
Bronze medal match
2 October
Japan (s.o.) | 0 (4)
South Korea | 0 (2)

=== Semi finals ===
30 September 2026
16:30

| China | 0–0 | Japan |
|---|---|---|
| | Report; SO Report |
Penalties
| Li (penalty shoot-out missed); Liu (penalty shoot-out scored); Ma (penalty shoot-out scored); Dan (penalty shoot-out scored); He (penalty shoot-out scored) | 4–2 | (penalty shoot-out scored) Murayama; (penalty shoot-out missed) Kobayakawa; (penalty shoot-out missed) Nakagomi; (penalty shoot-out scored) Hasegawa |

Gifu Prefectural Green Stadium
Umpires:
Laurine Delforge (BEL)
Kim Yoon-seon (KOR)

30 September 2026
19:00

| India | 2–0 | South Korea |
|---|---|---|
| Ishika 44'; Tete 48' | Report |

Gifu Prefectural Green Stadium
Umpires:
Aleisha Neumann (AUS)
Liu Xiaoying (CHN)

=== Bronze medal match ===
2 October 2026
16:30

| Japan | 0–0 | South Korea |
|---|---|---|
| | Report; SO Report |
Penalties
| Shimada (penalty shoot-out scored); Murayama (penalty shoot-out scored); Hasegawa (penalty shoot-out scored); Kobayakawa (penalty shoot-out scored) | 4–2 | (penalty shoot-out missed) Jung; (penalty shoot-out missed) Park Seu. (penalty shoot-out scored) An; (penalty shoot-out scored) L. Yu-jin |

Gifu Prefectural Green Stadium
Umpires:
Liu Xiaoying (CHN)
Valerie Koh (SGP)

=== Gold medal match ===
2 October 2026
20:00

| China | 0–1 | India |
|---|---|---|
| | Report | Lalremsiami 10' |

Gifu Prefectural Green Stadium
Umpires:
Kim Yoon-seon (KOR)
Laurine Delforge (BEL)

Women's Field hockey at the 2026 Asian Games
(India)
India
2nd title

== Final standings ==
As per statistical convention in field hockey, matches decided by penalty shoot-outs are counted as draws.

| Pos | Team | Pld | W | D | L | GF | GA | GD | Pts | Qualification |
|---|---|---|---|---|---|---|---|---|---|---|
| Gold medal | India | 7 | 7 | 0 | 0 | 69 | 3 | +66 | 21 | 2028 Summer Olympics |
| Silver medal | China | 7 | 5 | 1 | 1 | 46 | 1 | +45 | 16 | 2028 FIH Hockey Olympic Qualifiers |
| Bronze medal | Japan (H) | 7 | 4 | 2 | 1 | 23 | 4 | +19 | 14 | 2028 FIH Hockey Olympic Qualifiers |
| 4 | South Korea | 7 | 4 | 1 | 2 | 20 | 7 | +13 | 13 | 2028 FIH Hockey Olympic Qualifiers |
| 5 | Malaysia | 7 | 5 | 0 | 2 | 21 | 7 | +14 | 15 | 2028 FIH Hockey Olympic Qualifiers |
| 6 | Thailand | 7 | 3 | 0 | 4 | 8 | 30 | −22 | 9 | |
| 7 | Chinese Taipei | 7 | 2 | 1 | 4 | 10 | 24 | −14 | 7 | |
| 8 | Indonesia | 7 | 2 | 1 | 4 | 7 | 31 | −24 | 7 | |
| 9 | Bangladesh | 6 | 0 | 2 | 4 | 7 | 31 | −24 | 2 | |
| 10 | Singapore | 6 | 1 | 1 | 4 | 5 | 19 | −14 | 4 | |
| 11 | Kazakhstan | 6 | 0 | 2 | 4 | 5 | 36 | −31 | 2 | |
| 12 | Uzbekistan | 6 | 1 | 1 | 4 | 6 | 34 | −28 | 4 | |

Source: FIH
(H) Hosts

== Goalscorers ==
There were 227 goals scored in 40 matches, for an average of 5.67 goals per match.

21 goals

- (India) Deepika Sehrawat

10 goals

- (India) Navneet Kaur

9 goals

- (China) Zhong Jiaqi

8 goals

- (South Korea) Park Seung-ae

7 goals

- (China) Chen Yi
- (China) Zhang Ying
- (India) Lalremsiami
- (India) Rutuja Pisal

6 goals

- (India) Ishika
- (Japan) Shiho Kobayakawa
- (Malaysia) Khairunnisa Mohd

5 goals

- (China) Chen Yang
- (China) Yu Anhui
- (Chinese Taipei) Huang Yu-Ting
- (Kazakhstan) Viktoriya Lobanova
- (Malaysia) Nuramirah Zulkifli

4 goals

- (Bangladesh) Kona Akter
- (India) Sakshi Rana
- (India) Salima Tete
- (India) Sunelita Toppo

3 goals

- (China) Zou Meirong
- (Indonesia) Salma Maulani
- (Japan) Hanami Saito
- (Japan) Miyu Suzuki
- (Japan) Mai Toriyama
- (Malaysia) Nur Azhar
- (South Korea) An Su-jin
- (South Korea) Choi Ji-yun
- (Thailand) Kunjira Inpa

2 goals

- (Bangladesh) Airin Riya
- (China) Dan Wen
- (China) Fan Yunxia
- (China) Li Hong
- (China) Ma Ning
- (Chinese Taipei) Wang Yu-Chiu
- (India) Lalthantluangi
- (India) Neha Goyal
- (Indonesia) Innes Aditiya
- (Japan) Hiroka Murayama
- (Japan) Akari Nakagomi
- (Malaysia) Siti Husain
- (Malaysia) Zati Muhamad
- (South Korea) Park Mi-hyang
- (Uzbekistan) Yuliya Yubko

1 goal

- (Bangladesh) Orpita Pal
- (China) Liu Chencheng
- (China) Yang Liu
- (Chinese Taipei) Fan Hui-Yun
- (Chinese Taipei) Lai Ya-Han
- (Chinese Taipei) Wang Wen-Tsen
- (India) Baljeet Kaur
- (India) Nikki Pradhan
- (Indonesia) Lispa
- (Indonesia) Natasya Naiborhu
- (Japan) Miyu Hasegawa
- (Japan) Haruka Kawaguchi
- (Japan) Amiru Shimada
- (Japan) Maho Ueno
- (Malaysia) Nur Mazlan
- (Malaysia) Siti Shaikh
- (Malaysia) Nurmaizatul Syafi
- (Singapore) Cheryll Chia
- (Singapore) Jolene Ng
- (Singapore) Sardonna Ng
- (Singapore) Valerie Sim
- (Singapore) Toh Li Min
- (South Korea) Jung Sung-hee
- (South Korea) Kim Jeong-ihn
- (South Korea) Kim Seon-a
- (South Korea) Lee Yu-ri
- (Thailand) Trinetr Jirapitisatja
- (Thailand) Arucha Komolwit
- (Thailand) Suwapat Konthong
- (Thailand) Supansa Samanso
- (Thailand) Nadia Smeelen
- (Uzbekistan) Mutabar Amrieva
- (Uzbekistan) Mariya Demina
- (Uzbekistan) Madinabonu Khujaeva
- (Uzbekistan) Irina Semyonova

Source: FIH

== Records ==
- Deepika Sehrawat of India scored eight goals against Uzbekistan in a Pool B match to set a new record for the most goals by an individual female player in a single Asian Games game, on 20 September 2026. Deepika broke seven goals record of China's Gu Bingfeng created in a Pool B match against Hong Kong during the 2018 Asian Games, on 27 August 2018. Later, Deepika broke her own record by scoring nine against Thailand in a group match, on 23 September 2026.
- Deepika Sehrawat of India set a new record for the most goals (21) in a single Asian Games tournament. She broke 13 goals record of China's Gu Bingfeng created in the 2018 Asian Games.
- Deepika Sehrawat of India set a new record for the most goals (26) in the Asian Games. She broke 22 goals record of China's Gu Bingfeng.
- India women's national field hockey team set a new record for the most goals (69) in a single Asian Games tournament. The previous record of 49 goals was held by China which they made during the 2022 Asian Games.
- The India women's national field hockey team set the record for the most goals scored (301) in Asian Games history. The previous record of 273 goals was held by South Korea which they made during the 2022 Asian Games.

Note: All statistics are correct as of 2 October 2026.

== Controversies ==
=== Traffic snarl ===
The start of the women's hockey final at the Asian Games between India and China was delayed by an hour on 2 October after the teams' buses were caught in a traffic snarl on the way to the venue. An official, speaking on condition of anonymity, told PTI that an accident unrelated to the team buses had triggered the congestion, delaying the players' arrival at the Gifu Prefectural Green Stadium, hosting both the men's and women's hockey competitions. PTI, initially, reported that the match was delayed by 45 minutes, however, the actual delay was of one hour.

== See also ==
- Field hockey at the 2026 Asian Games
- Field hockey at the 2026 Asian Games – Men's tournament
