= Indonesia women's national field hockey team =

Indonesia
- Association: Indonesian Hockey Association
- Confederation: AHF (Asia)
- Head Coach: Krishnamurthy Gobinathan
- Captain: Nisa Indira

FIH ranking
- Current: 42 ▲4 (3 October 2026)

Asian Games
- Appearances: 3 (first in 2018)
- Best result: 7th (2018)

Asia Cup
- Appearances: 1 (first in 2022)
- Best result: 8th (2022)
Medal record
Southeast Asian Games
Silver medal – second place	2025 Thailand	Team
Bronze medal – third place	2023 Cambodia	Team

The Indonesia women's national field hockey team represents Indonesia in international field hockey competitions. As of September 2026, the team is ranked 45th in the world, by the International Hockey Federation. The governing body for the sports is the Indonesia Hockey Federation.

Indonesia qualified for the 2026 Asian games

== Competition history ==
A red box around the year indicates tournaments played within Indonesia and best results"

=== Asian Games ===
Asian Games record
Host / Year	Position	Pld	W	D	L
(India) 1982	Did not qualify				
(South Korea) 1986	Did not qualify				
(China) 1990	Did not qualify				
(Japan) 1994	Did not qualify				
(Thailand) 1998	Did not qualify				
(South Korea) 2002	Did not qualify				
(Qatar) 2006	Did not qualify				
(China) 2010	Did not qualify				
(South Korea) 2014	Did not qualify				
(Indonesia) 2018	7th place	5	2	0	3
(China) 2022	10th place	5	0	0	5
(Japan) 2026	8th place	7	2	1	4
Total	3/12	17	4	1	12

=== Asia Cup ===
Asia Cup record
Host / Year	Position	Pld	W	D	L
(Indonesia) 1982	Did not qualify				
(South Korea) 1985	Did not qualify				
(Hong Kong) 1989	Did not qualify				
(Japan) 1993	Did not qualify				
(India) 1999	Did not qualify				
(India) 2003	Did not qualify				
(Hong Kong) 2007	Did not qualify				
(Thailand) 2009	Did not qualify				
(Malaysia) 2013	Did not qualify				
(Japan) 2017	Did not qualify				
(Oman) 2022	8th place	5	0	0	5
Total	1/12	5	0	0	5

=== AHF Cup ===
AHF Cup record
Host / Year	Position	Pld	W	D	L
(Singapore) 1997	Did not qualify				
(Singapore) 2003	Did not qualify				
(Singapore) 2012	Did not qualify				
(Thailand) 2016	9th place	5	0	0	5
(Indonesia) 2025	4th place	6	1	4	1
Total	2/5	11	1	4	6

=== FIH Hockey Series ===
Hockey Series
Year	Round	Host city	Position
2018–19	Open	Singapore	Eliminated

=== AHF Central Asia Cup ===
AHF Central Asia Cup
Host / Year	Position	Pld	W	D	L	GF	GA
(Uzbekistan) 2025	1st place, gold medalist(s)	5	5	0	0	82	0
Total	1/1	5	3	0	0	82	0

=== Southeast Asian Games ===
Southeast Asian Games record
Host / Year	Position	Pld	W	D	L
(Thailand) 2007	Did not enter				
(Myanmar) 2013	5th place	6	2	0	4
(Singapore) 2015	4th place	4	0	0	4
(Malaysia) 2017	4th place	5	1	1	3
(Cambodia) 2023	3rd place, bronze medalist(s)	4	0	2	2
(Thailand) 2025	2nd place, silver medalist(s)	5	2	0	3
Total	5/6	24	5	3	16

== Current squad ==
The following is the Indonesia roster in the women's field hockey tournament of the 2026 Asian Games.

Head coach: (Malaysia) Iman Gobinathan

1. Greschela (GK)
2. Sri Rahayu
5. Natasya Naiborhu
6. Dea Destian
7. Lispa
8. Salma Maulani
9. Asri Dewi Prasasti
10. Bernika Mersella
11. Lily Pasaribu
12. Desi Wardani
13. Innes Aditiya
14. Nisa Indira (C)
15. Rasgita
18. Selly Florentina (GK)
19. Erika Kbarek
20. Azlia Richa
22. Fatma Hapsari
28. Keyssa Vinynda

== Results and fixtures ==
The following is a list of match results in the last 12 months, as well as any future matches that have been scheduled.

Win Draw Loss Fixture

=== 2026 ===
==== 9th Women's Hockey Invitational Tournament ====
6 March 2026 Round robin	Hong Kong	2–0	Indonesia	Kowloon, Hong Kong
19:45	Chan 10'; T. Chan 50'	Report		Stadium: King's Park

7 March 2026 Round robin	Thailand	4–0	Indonesia	Kowloon, Hong Kong
13:45	Jirapitisatja 38'; Aunjai 44', 45', 58'	Report		Stadium: King's Park

8 March 2026 Round robin	Singapore	1–5	Indonesia	Kowloon, Hong Kong
10:00	Sim 57'	Report	Prasasti 3', 46'; Maulani 8'; Vinynda 10'; Rahayu 32'	Stadium: King's Park

==== 2026 Asian Games Women's Qualifier ====
23 March 2026 Pool B	Kazakhstan	1–2	Indonesia	Jakarta, Indonesia
15:00	Lobanova 10'	Report	Lispa 7'; Naiborhu 11'	Stadium: GBK Hockey Field

24 March 2026 Pool B	Sri Lanka	1–3	Indonesia	Jakarta, Indonesia
20:00	Kumari 40'	Report	Maulani 4', 30'; Destian 23'	Stadium: GBK Hockey Field

26 March 2026 Pool B	Singapore	0–2	Indonesia	Jakarta, Indonesia
15:00		Report	Destian 38'; Maulani 40'	Stadium: GBK Hockey Field

28 March 2026 Semi-final	Indonesia	2–3	Chinese Taipei	Jakarta, Indonesia
17:30	Aditiya 14'; Maulani 34'	Report	Zhu 19'; Lai 39', 43'	Stadium: GBK Hockey Field

29 March 2026 Bronze medal match	Singapore	2–2 (1–3 p)	Indonesia	Jakarta, Indonesia
17:30	Sim 47'; I. Chan 52'	Report	Lispa 32'; Prasasti 48'	Stadium: GBK Hockey Field
	Penalties
	Ng (penalty shoot-out missed); Ho (penalty shoot-out missed); Ong (penalty shoot-out scored); Chia (penalty shoot-out missed)		(penalty shoot-out missed) Lispa; (penalty shoot-out scored) Indira; (penalty shoot-out scored) Rahayu; (penalty shoot-out scored) Prasasti

==== 2026 Asian Games ====
18 September 2026 Pool B	Japan	7–0	Indonesia	Kakamigahara, Japan
17:00	Kobayakawa 26'; Murayama 32'; Shimada 40'; Ueno 45'; Saito 47'; Suzuki 50', 57'	Report		Stadium: Gifu Prefectural Green Stadium

21 September 2026 Pool B	India	17–1	Indonesia	Kakamigahara, Japan
13:00	Deepika 8', 28', 40'; Toppo 11', 30'; Lalremsiami 12', 16'; Pisal 15', 20', 38'; Rana 25', 57'; Tete 34'; Navneet 35', 56', 57'; Ishika 36'	Report	Aditiya 32'	Stadium: Gifu Prefectural Green Stadium

23 September 2026 Pool B	Singapore	1–3	Indonesia	Kakamigahara, Japan
11:00	Ng 35'	Report	Lispa 26'; Maulani 29'; Naiborhu 54'	Stadium: Gifu Prefectural Green Stadium

25 September 2026 Pool B	Indonesia	1–0	Thailand	Kakamigahara, Japan
15:00	Maulani 38'	Report		Stadium: Gifu Prefectural Green Stadium

27 September 2026 Pool B	Indonesia	1–2	Uzbekistan	Kakamigahara, Japan
11:00	Maulani 58'	Report	Amrieva 3'; Semyonova 47'	Stadium: Gifu Prefectural Green Stadium

30 September 2026 5/8 Classification	Malaysia	3–0	Indonesia	Kakamigahara, Japan
11:30	Muhamad 20'; Mohd 41', 55'	Report		Stadium: Gifu Prefectural Green Stadium

2 October 2026 7th place match	Indonesia	1–1 (3–4 p)	Chinese Taipei	Kakamigahara, Japan
11:30	Aditiya 40'	Report	Lai 5'	Stadium: Gifu Prefectural Green Stadium
	Penalties
	Lispa (penalty shoot-out missed); Rahayu (penalty shoot-out missed); Indira (penalty shoot-out scored); Prasasti (penalty shoot-out scored); Aditiya (penalty shoot-out scored); Indira (penalty shoot-out missed); Prasasti (penalty shoot-out missed)		(penalty shoot-out missed) Huang; (penalty shoot-out scored) Lai; (penalty shoot-out scored) Wang; (penalty shoot-out scored) Chang; (penalty shoot-out missed) Fan; (penalty shoot-out missed) Wang; (penalty shoot-out scored) Chang

== See also ==
- Indonesia men's national field hockey team
