= Field hockey at the 2022 Asian Games =

Field Hockey tournament in Hangzhou, China

- Venues: Gongshu Canal Sports Park Field Hockey Field
- Location: Hangzhou, China
- Dates: 24 September–7 October 2023
- Nations: 14

Champions
- Men: India
- Women: China

Field hockey at the 2022 Asian Games was held at the Gongshu Canal Sports Park Field Hockey Field in the Gongshu District, Hangzhou, from 24 September to 7 October 2023.

The winners qualified for the 2024 Summer Olympics.

== Competition schedule ==
All times are local China Standard Time (UTC+8).

P	Preliminary round	½	Semi-finals	B	Bronze medal match	F	Gold medal match

Date Event	Sun 24	Mon 25	Tue 26	Wed 27	Thu 28	Fri 29	Sat 30	Sun 1	Mon 2	Tue 3	Wed 4	Thu 5	Fri 6		Sat 7	
Men	P		P		P		P		P		½		B	F		
Women		P		P		P		P		P		½			B	F

== Qualification ==
=== Men's qualification ===
Qualification	Date	Host	Berths	Qualified team
Host country	16 September 2016	—N/a	1	China
2018 Asian Games	20 August – 1 September 2018	(Indonesia) Jakarta	5	Japan; Malaysia; India; Pakistan; South Korea
2022 Asian Games Qualifier	6–15 May 2022	(Thailand) Bangkok	6	Oman; Bangladesh; Indonesia; Thailand; ~~Sri Lanka~~; Uzbekistan; Singapore
Total			12	

=== Women's qualification ===
Qualification	Date	Host	Berths	Qualified team
Host country	16 September 2016	—N/a	1	China
2018 Asian Games	19–31 August 2018	(Indonesia) Jakarta	5	Japan; India; South Korea; Malaysia; Thailand
2022 Asian Games Qualifier	6–14 June 2022	(Indonesia) Jakarta	4	Hong Kong; Kazakhstan; Singapore; ~~Uzbekistan~~; Indonesia
Total			10	

== Medal summary ==
=== Medal table ===
* Host nation (China)

Rank	Nation	Gold	Silver	Bronze	Total
1	India	1	0	1	2
2	China*	1	0	0	1
3	South Korea	0	1	1	2
4	Japan	0	1	0	1
Totals (4 entries)		2	2	2	6

=== Medalists ===
Event	Gold	Silver	Bronze
Men's tournament	India; Abhishek Nain; Amit Rohidas; Gurjant Singh; Hardik Singh; Harmanpreet Singh; Jarmanpreet Singh; Krishan Pathak; Lalit Upadhyay; Mandeep Singh; Manpreet Singh; Nilakanta Sharma; P. R. Sreejesh; Sanjay Rana; Shamsher Singh; Sukhjeet Singh; Sumit Walmiki; Varun Kumar; Vivek Prasad	Japan; Raiki Fujishima; Kentaro Fukuda; Ryosei Kato; Kosei Kawabe; Yamato Kawahara; Takumi Kitagawa; Genki Mitani; Yuma Nagai; Ken Nagayoshi; Takuma Niwa; Masaki Ohashi; Ryoma Ooka; Taiki Takade; Kaito Tanaka; Seren Tanaka; Shota Yamada; Manabu Yamashita; Takashi Yoshikawa	South Korea; Hwang Tae-il; Jang Jong-hyun; Jeong Jun-woo; Ji Woo-cheon; Jung Man-jae; Kang Young-bin; Kim Hyeong-jin; Kim Jae-hyeon; Kim Jung-hoo; Kim Sung-hyun; Lee Hye-seung; Lee Jung-jun; Lee Ju-young; Lee Nam-yong; Lee Seung-hoon; Park Cheo-leon; Son Da-in; Yang Ji-hun
Women's tournament	China; Ye Jiao; Gu Bingfeng; Yang Liu; Li Jiaqi; Zhang Ying; Chen Yi; Ma Ning; Liang Meiyu; Huang Haiyan; Li Hong; Ou Zixia; Dan Wen; Zou Meirong; Zhang Xiaoxue; He Jiangxin; Chen Yang; Zhong Jiaqi; Li Xinhuan	South Korea; Seo Jung-eun; An Hyo-ju; Kang Ji-na; Cheon Eun-bi; Cho Hye-jin; Kim Min-jeong; Cho Eun-ji; Lee Yu-ri; Choi Su-ji; Kim Jeong-ihn; Seo Su-young; Park Seung-ae; Baek Ee-seul; Kim Eun-ji; An Su-jin; Pak Ho-jeong; Lee Jin-min; Kim Eun-ji	India; Deep Grace Ekka; Monika Malik; Sonika Tandi; Nikki Pradhan; Bichu Devi Kharibam; Savita Punia; Sangita Kumari; Nisha Warsi; Vandana Katariya; Udita Duhan; Lalremsiami; Navneet Kaur; Sushila Chanu; Salima Tete; Neha Goyal; Ishika Chaudhary; Deepika Sehrawat; Vaishnavi Phalke

== Men's tournament ==
The competition consisted of two stages; a preliminary round followed by a final round.

=== Preliminary round ===
==== Pool A ====
Pos	Team	Pld	W	D	L	GF	GA	GD	Pts	Qualification
1	India	5	5	0	0	58	5	+53	15	Semi-finals
2	Japan	5	4	0	1	36	9	+27	12	Semi-finals
3	Pakistan	5	3	0	2	38	17	+21	9	Fifth place game
4	Bangladesh	5	2	0	3	15	29	−14	6	Seventh place game
5	Uzbekistan	5	1	0	4	7	49	−42	3	Ninth place game
6	Singapore	5	0	0	5	5	50	−45	0	Eleventh place game

Source: FIH
Rules for classification: 1) points; 2) matches won; 3) goal difference; 4) goals for; 5) head-to-head result; 6) field goals for.

==== Pool B ====
Pos	Team	Pld	W	D	L	GF	GA	GD	Pts	Qualification
1	China (H)	5	4	1	0	24	9	+15	13	Semi-finals
2	South Korea	5	4	0	1	42	8	+34	12	Semi-finals
3	Malaysia	5	3	1	1	36	11	+25	10	Fifth place game
4	Oman	5	2	0	3	14	35	−21	6	Seventh place game
5	Indonesia	5	1	0	4	7	28	−21	3	Ninth place game
6	Thailand	5	0	0	5	3	35	−32	0	Eleventh place game

Source: FIH
Rules for classification: 1) points; 2) matches won; 3) goal difference; 4) goals for; 5) head-to-head result; 6) field goals for.
(H) Hosts

=== Medal round ===
Semi-finals
4 October
India	5
South Korea	3
4 October
China	2
Japan	3

Gold medal match
6 October
India	5
Japan	1
Bronze medal match
6 October
South Korea	2
China	1

=== Final standings ===
Pos	Team	Qualification
1st place, gold medalist(s)	India	2024 Summer Olympics
2nd place, silver medalist(s)	Japan	2024 FIH Hockey Olympic Qualifiers
3rd place, bronze medalist(s)	South Korea	2024 FIH Hockey Olympic Qualifiers
4	China (H)	2024 FIH Hockey Olympic Qualifiers
5	Pakistan	2024 FIH Hockey Olympic Qualifiers
6	Malaysia	2024 FIH Hockey Olympic Qualifiers
7	Oman	
8	Bangladesh	
9	Indonesia	
10	Uzbekistan	
11	Thailand	
12	Singapore	

Source: FIH
(H) Host

== Women's tournament ==
The competition consisted of two stages; a preliminary round followed by a final round.

=== Preliminary round ===
==== Pool A ====
Pos	Team	Pld	W	D	L	GF	GA	GD	Pts	Qualification
1	India	4	3	1	0	33	1	+32	10	Semi-finals
2	South Korea	4	3	1	0	17	1	+16	10	Semi-finals
3	Malaysia	4	2	0	2	16	12	+4	6	Fifth place game
4	Singapore	4	1	0	3	2	25	−23	3	Seventh place game
5	Hong Kong	4	0	0	4	0	29	−29	0	Ninth place game

Source: FIH
Rules for classification: 1) points; 2) matches won; 3) goal difference; 4) goals for; 5) head-to-head result; 6) field goals for.

==== Pool B ====
Pos	Team	Pld	W	D	L	GF	GA	GD	Pts	Qualification
1	Japan	4	4	0	0	31	0	+31	12	Semi-finals
2	China (H)	4	3	0	1	43	2	+41	9	Semi-finals
3	Thailand	4	2	0	2	7	26	−19	6	Fifth place game
4	Kazakhstan	4	1	0	3	2	24	−22	3	Seventh place game
5	Indonesia	4	0	0	4	1	32	−31	0	Ninth place game

Source: FIH
Rules for classification: 1) points; 2) matches won; 3) goal difference; 4) goals for; 5) head-to-head result; 6) field goals for.
(H) Hosts

=== Medal round ===
Semi-finals
5 October
India	0
China	4
5 October
Japan	2 (3)
South Korea	2 (4)

Final
7 October
China	2
South Korea	0
Third place
7 October
India	2
Japan	1

=== Final standings ===
Pos	Team	Qualification
1st place, gold medalist(s)	China (H)	2024 Summer Olympics
2nd place, silver medalist(s)	South Korea	2024 FIH Hockey Olympic Qualifiers
3rd place, bronze medalist(s)	India	2024 FIH Hockey Olympic Qualifiers
4	Japan	2024 FIH Hockey Olympic Qualifiers
5	Malaysia	2024 FIH Hockey Olympic Qualifiers
6	Thailand	
7	Singapore	
8	Kazakhstan	
9	Hong Kong	
10	Indonesia	

Source: FIH
(H) Host
