= Lalremsiami Hmarzote =

Indian field hockey player (born 2000)

Lalremsiami
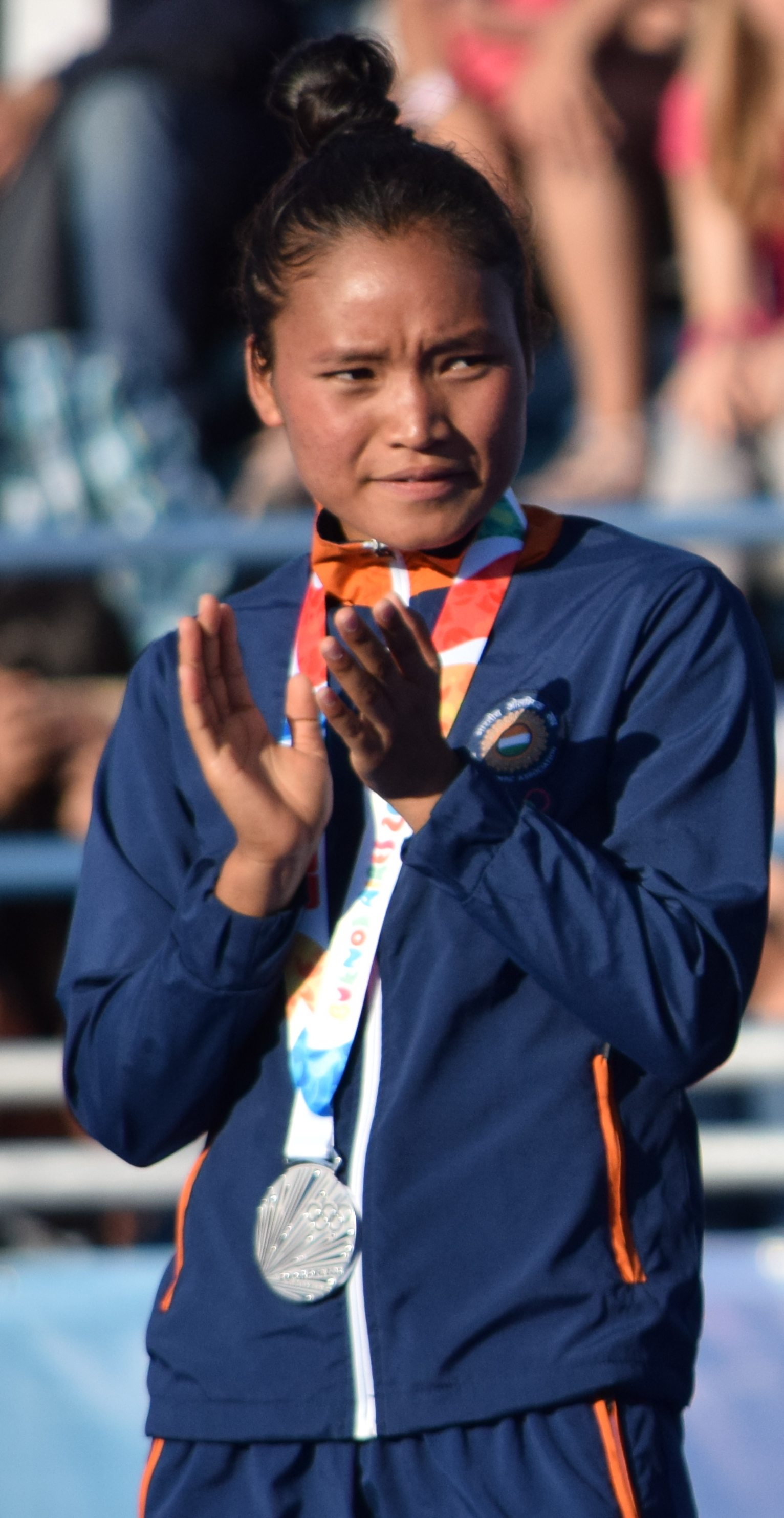
- Hmar Zote at the 2018 Summer Youth Olympics

Personal information
- Born: Lalremsiami Hmar Zote; 30 March 2000 (age 26) Kolasib, Mizoram, India
- Height: 1.57 m (5 ft 2 in)
- Weight: 52 kg (115 lb)

Sport
- Sport: Field hockey
- Position: Forward; Halfback
Youth career
- Years: Team
- 2016: India U18
- 2018: India U18 Hockey5's
Senior career
Years	Team	Caps	Goals
–	Hockey Mizoram	-	-
–	Sports Authority of India	-	-
–	Railways	-	-
2025–	Rarh Bengal Tigers	-	-
National team
Years	Team	Caps	Goals
2022	India U21	6	(2)
2017–	India	200	(54)
Medal record
Women's field hockey
Representing India
Asian Games
Gold medal – first place	2026 Aichi–Nagoya	Team
Silver medal – second place	2018 Jakarta	Team
Bronze medal – third place	2022 Hangzhou	Team
Commonwealth Games
Bronze medal – third place	2022 Birmingham	Team
Asia Cup
Gold medal – first place	2017 Gifu
Silver medal – second place	2025 Hangzhou
Bronze medal – third place	2022 Muscat
Asian Champions Trophy
Gold medal – first place	2023 Ranchi
Gold medal – first place	2024 Rajgir
Silver medal – second place	2018 Donghae
FIH Nations Cup
Gold medal – first place	2022 Spain
Gold medal – first place	2026 Auckland
Youth Olympic Games
Silver medal – second place	2018 Buenos Aires	Team
Girls' Asia Cup
Bronze medal – third place	2016 Bangkok

Lalremsiami Hmar Zote (born 30 March 2000) is an Indian field hockey player who plays as a forward and occasionally as a halfback for the Indian national team. At the club level, she plays for Sports Authority of India. At the 2018 Asian Games, she became the first sportsperson from Mizoram to win an Asian medal after she won silver. Also, in 2026, she became the first sportsperson from Mizoram to be honoured with Arjuna Award. Lalremsiami was conferred the Arjuna Award for the year 2025 by President Droupadi Murmu at Rashtrapati Bhavan, New Delhi, on 13 November 2026, in recognition of her outstanding contribution to Indian hockey. She was among 17 athletes honoured at the National Sports Awards 2025 ceremony

== Early life ==
Lalremsiami was born into a family of agriculturists in Kolasib, a town approximately 80 kilometres (50 mi) from Aizawl, Mizoram. Her father, Lalthansanga Zote (d. 2019), served in the Indian army and later worked as a farmer and her mother, Lalzarmawii, a homemaker. Lalremsiami was selected to a hockey academy run by the government of Mizoram in Thenzawl, Serchhip when she was 11. In 2016, she joined the National Hockey Academy in New Delhi. Struggling with Hindi during this time, she picked up the language with the help of teammates who call her 'Siami', a shortened nickname of her full name.

== Career ==
=== 2016–2020: Youth level and early international career ===
Lalremsiami Hmar Zote was included in the under-18 India side that won bronze at the Asia Cup in 2016, before being drafted to the senior camp the following year by Baljit Singh Saini, then coach of the junior team. She represented the U-18 hockey5s side at Asian Youth Olympic Games qualifier, that her side finished second in. Lalremsiami finished the tournament scoring seven goals in five games. Lalremsiami was first included in the senior team for its tour of Europe in September 2017. She was again included in the squad for India's victorious Asia Cup campaign that year, the win coming after 13 years. Her first goal came against Singapore in a 10–0 win in a group-stage fixture. In the 2018 Asian Champions Trophy, Lalremsiami played for a total of 31 minutes on the field across five matches scoring two goals, including an equalizer in a crucial final round-robin match, and was named the tournament's U-21 rising star award. India won silver in the campaign.

Lalremsiami was included in the squad for the 2018 World Cup as India's youngest player at 18. After strong performances in the league games, she scored her first and only goal of the tournament in the crossover match against Italy. Receiving an assist at the far post sent in off a long corner by Reena Khokhar, Lalremsiami scored off the reverse stick on seeing goalkeeper Martina Chirico advance, giving her side an early 1–0 lead. India advanced to the quarter-final after a 3–0 win. Facing Ireland in the quarter-final, her side lost in the penalty shoot-out and finished in the eighth place.

Lalremsiami scored four goals at the Jakarta Asian Games that followed the World Cup. The first goal came in the 24th minute of the group stage game against Indonesia that her team went on to win 8–0. She scored a hat-trick in a 21–0 victory over Kazakhstan in the next game; the win margin was India's second best at the Games. Following good performances, her team lost to Japan by a 1–2 margin in the final, settling for the silver medal. In the process, Lalremsiami became the first sportsperson from Mizoram to win an Asian Games medal. In the five-a-side event at the Buenos Aires Youth Olympics that year, she helped India secure a silver medal, their first in the history of the Games. Lalremsiami scored nine goals in the competition, that included braces against Austria, Uruguay and Vanuatu.

Lalremsiami scored a brace against Spain in her team's 5–2 win against them on their tour of the country in January 2019. Her performances in 2019 fetched her the FIH Rising Star of the Year award.

=== 2021–present: Tokyo Olympics ===
Lalremsiami toured Argentina and Germany with the Indian squad in preparation for the Olympic Games in early 2021. In June that year, she was named in the Olympics squad, becoming the first female sportsperson from Mizoram to represent India at the Games. Her team was placed fourth, their best ever finish at the Games, and was ranked eighth in the FIH World Rankings, their highest ever. She was subsequently appointed the chief coach, a group A post, under the Mizoram sports and youth services department. A cash reward of ₹25 lakh and a housing plot were allotted to her by the government.

In November 2021, Lalremsiami was named captain of the India national under-21 team for the 2022 Junior World Cup. A few months later, ahead of the tournament, Salima Tete was named captain. India finished fourth. In the Asia Cup that year, India won bronze; Lalremsiami scored twice: in a 9–0 win over Malaysia and a 2–3 loss to South Korea in the semi-final. Lalremsiami played in the midfield in the tournament as opposed to her traditional position of forward. In the gold medal match against China in the 2026 Asian Games, which was her 200th match for India, she struck a reverse hit goal that helped India to win the match by 1–0 and brought the Asiad gold after 44 years.
