= Malaysia national field hockey team =

Malaysia national field hockey team may refer to:

- Malaysia men's national field hockey team
- Malaysia women's national field hockey team
