= Field hockey at the 2026 Asian Games – Women's Qualifier =

2026 Women's Asian Games Qualifier
Tournament details
- Host country: Indonesia
- City: Jakarta
- Dates: 23 – 29 April 2026
- Teams: 8 (from 1 confederation)
- Venue: Gelora Bung Karno Sports Complex

Final positions
- Champions: Chinese Taipei
- Runner-up: Bangladesh
- Third place: Indonesia

Tournament statistics
- Matches played: 20
- Goals scored: 83 (4.15 per match)
- Top scorer(s): (Uzbekistan) Mariya Demina (Bangladesh) Airin Riya (5 goals)
- Best player: (Singapore) Valerie Sim
- Best young player: (Indonesia) Erika Kbarek
- Best goalkeeper: (Kazakhstan) Guzal Bakhavaddin

The 2026 Women's Asian Games Qualifier was the qualification tournament for the women's field hockey event at the 2026 Asian Games. It was held from 23 April to 29 April 2026 in Jakarta, Indonesia. The top six teams qualified for the 2026 Asian Games.

== Teams ==
- Bangladesh
- Chinese Taipei
- Hong Kong
- Indonesia
- Kazakhstan
- Singapore
- Sri Lanka
- Uzbekistan

== Preliminary round ==
=== Pool A ===
Pos	Team	Pld	W	D	L	GF	GA	GD	Pts	Qualification
1	Bangladesh	3	2	1	0	10	8	+2	7	Semi-finals
2	Chinese Taipei	3	1	2	0	9	8	+1	5	Semi-finals
3	Hong Kong	3	1	0	2	6	3	+3	3	
4	Uzbekistan	3	0	1	2	5	11	−6	1	

Source: FIH
Rules for classification: 1) points; 2) matches won; 3) goal difference; 4) goals for; 5) head-to-head result; 6) field goals for.

All times are in (UTC+7)

23 April 2026
12:30

Hong Kong	5–0 (Forfeit)	Uzbekistan
	Report	Yubko 3', 40'; Semyonova 10', 39'

Umpires:
Mitra Syumanja (INA)
Neranji Attipola (SRI)

23 April 2026
17:30

Chinese Taipei	5–5	Bangladesh
Zhu 9'; Liao 23'; Fan 29'; Huang 34', 36'	Report	Riya 8'; Pal 10', 17', 44'; Akter 40'

Umpires:
Lulu Li (CHN)
Rinky See (HKG)

24 April 2026
12:30

Uzbekistan	2–3	Bangladesh
Khujaeva 12'; Khaydarova 46'	Report	Rimon 11'; Akter 24'; Riya 40'

Umpires:
Lulu Li (CHN)
Alizah Puteri (INA)

24 April 2026
15:00

Chinese Taipei	1–0	Hong Kong
Pu 60+'	Report

Umpires:
Shahiela Johari (MAS)
Aigerim Makhanova (KAZ)

26 April 2026
17:30

Hong Kong	1–2	Bangladesh
Law 1'	Report	Nadira 10'; Akter 39'

Umpires:
Elyor Kholmirzaev (UZB)
Alizah Puteri (INA)

26 April 2026
20:00

Uzbekistan	3–3	Chinese Taipei
Khaydarova 25'; Demina 39'; Semyonova 60'	Report	Mao 5'; Fan 37'; Lai 48'

Umpires:
Lulu Li (CHN)
Shahiela Johari (MAS)

=== Pool B ===
Pos	Team	Pld	W	D	L	GF	GA	GD	Pts	Qualification
1	Indonesia (H)	3	3	0	0	7	2	+5	9	Semi-finals
2	Singapore	3	2	0	1	4	4	0	6	Semi-finals
3	Sri Lanka	3	1	0	2	5	7	−2	3	
4	Kazakhstan	3	0	0	3	4	7	−3	0	

Source: FIH
Rules for classification: 1) points; 2) matches won; 3) goal difference; 4) goals for; 5) head-to-head result; 6) field goals for.
(H) Hosts

All times are in (UTC+7)

23 April 2026
15:00

Kazakhstan	1–2	Indonesia
Lobanova 10'	Report	Lispa 7'; Naiborhu 11'

Umpires:
Valerie Koh (SGP)
Keme Karmoker (BAN)

23 April 2026
20:00

Singapore	2–1	Sri Lanka
S. Ng 16'; Sim 59'	Report	Kaluarachchi 18'

Umpires:
Shahiela Johari (MAS)
Elyor Kholmirzaev (UZB)

24 April 2026
17:30

Kazakhstan	1–2	Singapore
Lobanova 17'	Report	Ong 17'; Tay 22'

Umpires:
Neranji Attipola (SRI)
Rinky See (HKG)

24 April 2026
20:00

Sri Lanka	1–3	Indonesia
Kumari 40'	Report	Maulani 4', 30'; Destian 23'

Umpires:
Valerie Koh (SGP)
Elyor Kholmirzaev (UZB)

26 April 2026
12:30

Sri Lanka	3–2	Kazakhstan
Gangedura 19'; Kumari 38'; Sandali 48'	Report	Chepkassova 42'; Yersultan 49'

Umpires:
Valerie Koh (SGP)
Mitra Syumanja (INA)

26 April 2026
15:00

Singapore	0–2	Indonesia
	Report	Destian 38'; Maulani 40'

Umpires:
Neranji Attipola (SRI)
Rinky See (HKG)

== Fifth to eighth place Classification ==
=== Bracket ===
Semi-finals
28 April
Hong Kong	0 (3)
Kazakhstan (p.s.o.)	0 (4)
28 April
Sri Lanka	1
Uzbekistan	6

Fifth place
29 April
Kazakhstan (p.s.o.)	1 (2)
Uzbekistan	1 (0)
Seventh place
29 April
Hong Kong	6
Sri Lanka	2

=== 5–8th place semi-finals ===
28 April 2026
12:30

Hong Kong	0–0	Kazakhstan
	Report
Penalties
Lau (penalty shoot-out scored); Wong (penalty shoot-out missed); McNeil (penalty shoot-out missed); Chan (penalty shoot-out scored); T. Chan (penalty shoot-out missed); T. Chan (penalty shoot-out scored); Chan (penalty shoot-out missed)	3–4	(penalty shoot-out scored) Gataulina; (penalty shoot-out missed) Domashneva; (penalty shoot-out missed) Lobanova; (penalty shoot-out scored) Lyapina; (penalty shoot-out missed) Khairusheva; (penalty shoot-out scored) Gataulina; (penalty shoot-out scored) Domashneva

Umpires:
Valerie Koh (SGP)
Alizah Puteri (INA)

28 April 2026
15:00

Sri Lanka	1–6	Uzbekistan
Kaluarachchi 28'	Report	Demina 30', 30', 38', 45'; Yubko 31'; Semyonova 49'

Umpires:
Lulu Li (CHN)
Mitra Syumanja (INA)

=== Seventh place game ===
29 April 2026
12:30

Hong Kong	6–2	Sri Lanka
T. Chan 8'; Lau 12', 49', 53'; Cheung 32', 60'	Report	Kumari 14'; Divyanjali 45+'

Umpires:
Shahiela Johari (MAS)
Aigerim Makhanova (KAZ)

=== Fifth place game ===
29 April 2026
15:00

Kazakhstan	1–1	Uzbekistan
Lobanova 26'	Report	Khujaeva 51'
Penalties
Gataulina (penalty shoot-out missed); Domashneva (penalty shoot-out scored); Lyapina (penalty shoot-out scored)	2–0	(penalty shoot-out missed) Demina; (penalty shoot-out missed) Yubko; (penalty shoot-out missed) Khaydarova; (penalty shoot-out missed) Khujaeva

Umpires:
Mitra Syumanja (INA)
Keme Karmoker (BAN)

== First to fourth place Classification ==
=== Bracket ===
Semi-finals
28 April
Bangladesh	3
Singapore	1
28 April
Indonesia	2
Chinese Taipei	3

Final
29 April
Bangladesh	1
Chinese Taipei	3
Third place
29 April
Indonesia (p.s.o.)	2 (3)
Singapore	2 (1)

=== Semi-finals ===
28 April 2026
17:30

Bangladesh	3–1	Singapore
Riya 8', 57', 58'	Report	Cheryll 12'

Umpires:
Shahiela Johari (MAS)
Neranji Attipola (SRI)

28 April 2026
20:00

Indonesia	2–3	Chinese Taipei
Aditiya 14'; Maulani 34'	Report	Zhu 19'; Lai 39', 43'

Umpires:
Elyor Kholmirzaev (UZB)
Rinky See (HKG)

=== Third place game ===
29 April 2026
17:30

Singapore	2–2	Indonesia
Sim 47'; I. Chan 52'	Report	Lispa 32'; Prasasti 48'
Penalties
J. Ng (penalty shoot-out missed); Ho (penalty shoot-out missed); Ong (penalty shoot-out scored); Chia (penalty shoot-out missed)	1–3	(penalty shoot-out missed) Lispa; (penalty shoot-out scored) Indira; (penalty shoot-out scored) Rahayu; (penalty shoot-out scored) Prasasti

Umpires:
Lulu Li (CHN)
Elyor Kholmirzaev (UZB)

=== Final ===
29 April 2026
20:00

Bangladesh	1–3	Chinese Taipei
Pal 8'	Report	Wang 17'; Mao 32'; Huang 40'

Umpires:
Valerie Koh (SGP)
Alizah Puteri (INA)

== Goalscorers ==
There were 83 goals scored in 20 matches, for an average of 4.15 goals per match.

5 goals

- (Uzbekistan) Mariya Demina
- (Bangladesh) Airin Riya

4 goals

- (Indonesia) Salma Maulani
- (Bangladesh) Orpita Pal
- (Uzbekistan) Irina Semyonova

3 goals

- (Bangladesh) Kona Akter
- (Chinese Taipei) Huang Yu-Ting
- (Sri Lanka) Samadara Kumari
- (Chinese Taipei) Lai Ya-Han
- (Hong Kong) Lau Pui Sze
- (Kazakhstan) Viktoriya Lobanova
- (Uzbekistan) Yuliya Yubko

2 goals

- (Hong Kong) Evelyn Cheung
- (Indonesia) Dea Destian
- (Chinese Taipei) Fan Hui-Yun
- (Sri Lanka) K Vimukthini Kaluarachchi
- (Uzbekistan) Zulkhumor Khaydarova
- (Uzbekistan) Madinabonu Khujaeva
- (Indonesia) Lispa
- (Chinese Taipei) Mao I-Hsuan
- (Singapore) Valerie Sim
- (Chinese Taipei) Zhu Yi-Chun

1 goal

- (Indonesia) Innes Aditiya
- (Singapore) Ivy Chan
- (Hong Kong) Chan Yi Man
- (Kazakhstan) Alissa Chepkassova
- (Singapore) Cheryll Chia
- (Sri Lanka) Pabodha Divyanjali
- (Bangladesh) Nadira Ema
- (Sri Lanka) Geethika Gangedura
- (Hong Kong) Law Ka Mun Melissa
- (Chinese Taipei) Liao Pei-Shan
- (Sri Lanka) Sandali Lokuketagodage
- (Indonesia) Natasya Naiborhu
- (Singapore) Sardonna Ng
- (Singapore) Nadiah Ong
- (Indonesia) Asri Dewi Prasasti
- (Chinese Taipei) Agustin-Linmey Pu
- (Bangladesh) Sharika Rimon
- (Singapore) Valerie Tay
- (Chinese Taipei) Wang Yu-Chiu
- (Kazakhstan) Akzhan Yer sultan

Source: FIH

== Final standings ==
Pos	Team	Qualification
1	Chinese Taipei	2026 Asian Games
2	Bangladesh	2026 Asian Games
3	Indonesia	2026 Asian Games
4	Singapore	2026 Asian Games
5	Kazakhstan	2026 Asian Games
6	Uzbekistan	2026 Asian Games
7	Hong Kong	
8	Sri Lanka	

Source: FIH

== See also ==
- Field hockey at the 2026 Asian Games – Men's Qualifier
