= Sri Lanka Hockey Federation =

Governing body of field hockey in Sri Lanka

- Sport: Field hockey
- Jurisdiction: Sri Lanka
- Affiliation: FIH
- Regional affiliation: AHF
- President: Sumith Edirisinghe
- Secretary: Gamini Jayasinghe
- (Sri Lanka)

The Sri Lanka Hockey Federation is the governing body of field hockey in Sri Lanka. It is affiliated to IHF International Hockey Federation and AHF Asian Hockey Federation. The headquarters of the federation are in Colombo.

Sumith Edirisinghe is the President of the Sri Lanka Hockey Federation and Gamini Jayasinghe is the General Secretary.

== See also ==
- Sri Lanka men's national field hockey team
- Sri Lanka women's national field hockey team
