= 2025 AHF Women's Central Asia Cup =

Tournament details
- Host country: Uzbekistan
- City: Tashkent
- Dates: 11–17 October
- Teams: 5 (from 1 confederation)
- Venue: Uzbekistan Olympic City Hockey Pitch

Final positions
- Champions: Indonesia (1st title)
- Runner-up: Uzbekistan
- Third place: Kazakhstan

Tournament statistics
- Matches played: 10
- Goals scored: 236 (23.6 per match)
- Top scorer: (Kazakhstan) Dilnaz Nigmetzhanova (28 goals)

The 2025 AHF Women's Central Asia Cup was the second edition of the AHF Women's Central Asia Cup, the international women's field hockey championship of Central Asia. It was held in Tashkent, Uzbekistan from 11 to 17 October 20125.

== Teams ==
The following five teams, shown with pre-tournament FIH World Rankings, participated in the tournament.

- Indonesia (76)
- Kazakhstan (38)
- Kyrgyzstan (-)
- Tajikistan (81)
- Uzbekistan (66)

== Results ==
All times are local (UTC+5).

=== Standings ===
| Pos | Team | Pld | W | D | L | GF | GA | GD | Pts |
|---|---|---|---|---|---|---|---|---|---|
| 1 | Indonesia | 4 | 4 | 0 | 0 | 82 | 0 | +82 | 12 |
| 2 | Uzbekistan (H) | 4 | 3 | 0 | 1 | 73 | 4 | +69 | 9 |
| 3 | Kazakhstan | 4 | 2 | 0 | 2 | 73 | 5 | +68 | 6 |
| 4 | Tajikistan | 4 | 1 | 0 | 3 | 8 | 63 | −55 | 3 |
| 5 | Kyrgyzstan | 4 | 0 | 0 | 4 | 0 | 164 | −164 | 0 |

Source: FIH
Rules for classification: 1) points; 2) matches won; 3) goal difference; 4) goals for; 5) head-to-head result; 6) field goals scored.
(H) Hosts

11 October 2025
15:00

| Uzbekistan | 51–0 | Kyrgyzstan |
|---|---|---|
| Khaydarova 1', 9', 10', 11', 16', 18', 20', 21', 29', 31'; Abdugaforova 2', 8', 15', 20', 28', 33'; Fayzillaeva 2', 3', 7'; Ulmasova 4', 21', 22', 27', 40', 41'; Ikromova 6'; Mirzaeva 6', 26', 36', 59'; Zaripova 7', 19', 29', 29', 43', 53'; Amrieva 11', 32', 46', 50', 55'; Khujaeva 17', 19', 50', 51'; Soyibjonova 23', 25', 31', 35'; Kuzieva 24'; Khakimova 38' | Report |

Umpires:
Zarina Ilyassova (KAZ)
Tian Yu (CHN)

12 October 2025
10:30

| Indonesia | 31–0 | Tajikistan |
|---|---|---|
| Sri 2', 12', 17', 19', 22', 36', 41', 59', 60'; Indira 3', 26', 45'; Maulani 6', 15', 45+', 56'; Natasya 7', 9', 28'; Tiarma 13'; Prasasti 14', 19', 34', 38'; Lily 25'; Aditiya 30', 37', 39', 39', 52'; Lispa 35' | Report |

Umpires:
Zarina Ilyassova (KAZ)
Zarinabonu Barnoeva (UZB)

12 October 2025
15:00

| Kazakhstan | 60–0 | Kyrgyzstan |
|---|---|---|
| Aslankyzy 1', 22'; Nigmetzhanova 3', 3', 6', 7', 13', 14', 17', 26', 27', 31', 34'; Nigmetzhanova (continued) 39', 39', 47', 47', 49', 51', 54', 55'; Yeskendir 5', 12', 40', 42', 44', 60'; Bolatbek 7', 19'; Bektemissova 10', 11', 18', 23', 35', 38', 39', 45', 45'; Bektemissova (continued) 46', 50', 57'; Amangeldi 12', 14', 18', 36'; Mazhim 15', 27', 28', 59'; Bolganbay 21', 35', 37'; Seiitzhan 21', 58'; Rakhym 40'; Suleimen 41', 51', 53'; Yeskendir 42'; Abdrakhman 43' | Report |

Umpires:
Tian Yu (CHN)
Isroil Kuryazov (UZB)

13 October 2025
15:00

| Uzbekistan | 19–0 | Tajikistan |
|---|---|---|
| Fayzillaeva 16', 17'; Abdugaforova 18'; Adizova 21'; Ikromova 22'; Amrieva 34', 49'; Khaydarova 36', 50', 57', 58', 60+'; Soyibjonova 37', 52'; Khujaeva 48'; Mirzaeva 57'; Zaripova 58', 59'; Khakmova 60' | Report |

Umpires:
Tianhe Ren (CHN)
King Yiu Ho (HKG)

14 October 2025
12:45

| Indonesia | 2–0 | Kazakhstan |
|---|---|---|
| Natasya 7'; Maulani 50' | Report |

Umpires:
Tian Yu (CHN)
King Yiu Ho (HKG)

15 October 2025
10:30

| Tajikistan | 8–0 | Kyrgyzstan |
|---|---|---|
| Subanova 1'; Imonnazarova 6', 11', 11', 38'; Baimakova 6'; Ismoilova 7', 7' | Report |

Umpires:
Zarina Ilyassova (KAZ)
Zarinabonu Barnoeva (UZB)

15 October 2025
12:45

| Uzbekistan | 3–0 | Kazakhstan |
|---|---|---|
| Khaydarova 26', 47'; Khujaeva 12' | Report |

Umpires:
Khalid Hussain (HKG)
Tian Yu (CHN)

16 October 2025
12:45

| Kyrgyzstan | 0–45 | Indonesia |
|---|---|---|
| | Report | Prasasti 1', 1', 5', 7', 9', 10', 54', 54', 55'; Sri 3', 6', 7', 10', 38', 47', 48', 50'; Sri (continued.) 51', 55', 56', 58'; Indira 5', 9', 12', 32'; Aditiya 6', 11', 11', 19', 21', 27', 36'; Natasya 7', 11', 20', 22', 29', 34', 38', 39', 41', 43', 53'; Lispa 28' |

Umpires:
Adilzhan Kudaibergen (KAZ)
Zarina Ilyassova (KAZ)

17 October 2025
10:30

| Kazakhstan | 13–0 | Tajikistan |
|---|---|---|
| Nigmetzhanova 1', 4', 5', 8', 14', 34', 39', 54', 58'; Suleimen 13'; Bektemissova 21'; Yeskendir 33'; Seiitzhan 37' | Report |

Umpires:
Elyor Kholmirzaev (UZB)
Abdulaziz Abdulkhakimov (UZB)

17 October 2025
15:00

| Indonesia | 4–0 | Uzbekistan |
|---|---|---|
| Aditiya 5'; Sri 31', 42'; Maulani 56' | Report |

Umpires:
Tian Yu (CHN)
Zarina Ilyassova (KAZ)
