= Malaysia women's national field hockey team =

Malaysia
- Association: Malaysian Women's Hockey Association (MWHA)
- Confederation: AHF (Asia)
- Head Coach: C. R. Kumar
- Manager: Siti Othman
- Captain: Nur Hasliza

FIH ranking
- Current: 21 (3 October 2026)

Asian Games
- Appearances: 8 (first in 1982)
- Best result: 3rd (1982)

Asia Cup
- Appearances: 9 (first in 1985)
- Best result: 3rd (1985)
Medal record
Asian Games
Bronze medal – third place	1982 New Delhi	Team
Asia Cup
Bronze medal – third place	1985 Seoul
Asian Champions Trophy
Bronze medal – third place	2013 Kakamigahara

The Malaysia women's national field hockey team represents Malaysia in international field hockey competitions. As of Jan 2023, the team is ranked 19th in the FIH World Rankings. The team is part of the Asian Hockey Federation.

Malaysia achieved 5th place in the 2007 Women's Hockey Asia Cup. The team won a bronze medal in the 1982 Asian Games and came 4th in 1986.

== History ==
In 2010, the women's national team is invited to play in Malaysia Junior Hockey League as preparation match before the World Cup qualifier.

The following season, the women's national team joined with Bandar Penawar Sports School to enter as a team in Division 2 of MHJL.

The women's national hockey team created a world record with their 36–0 thrashing over Cambodia during a group match in 2013 Southeast Asian Games, Yangon. It is a new world record for the highest score in an international match, last held by Argentina after they defeated Peru 26–0 at the South American Women's Championships in Santiago, Chile, in 2003.

== Tournament records ==
World Cup
Year	Host city	Position
1974	Mandelieu, France	DNQ
1976	Berlin, West Germany	DNQ
1978	Madrid, Spain	DNQ
1981	Buenos Aires, Argentina	DNQ
1983	Kuala Lumpur, Malaysia	DNQ
1986	Amsterdam, Netherlands	DNQ
1990	Sydney, Australia	DNQ
1994	Dublin, Ireland	DNQ
1998	Utrecht, Netherlands	DNQ
2002	Perth, Australia	DNQ
2006	Madrid, Spain	DNQ
2010	Rosario, Argentina	DNQ
2014	The Hague, Netherlands	DNQ
2018	London, England	DNQ
2022	Terrassa, Spain; Amstelveen, Netherlands	DNQ
2026	Wavre, Belgium; Amstelveen, Netherlands	DNQ

Asian Games
Year	Host city	Position
1982	New Delhi, India	3rd
1986	Seoul, South Korea	4th
1990	Beijing, China	DNQ
1994	Hiroshima, Japan	DNQ
1998	Bangkok, Thailand	DNQ
2002	Busan, South Korea	DNQ
2006	Doha, Qatar	5th
2010	Guangzhou, China	5th
2014	Incheon, South Korea	5th
2018	Jakarta, Indonesia	5th
2022	Hangzhou, China	5th
2026	Aichi and Nagoya, Japan	5th

Asia Cup
Year	Host city	Position
1985	Seoul, South Korea	3rd
1989	Hong Kong	DNQ
1993	Hiroshima, Japan	DNQ
1999	New Delhi, India	6th
2004	New Delhi, India	6th
2007	Hong Kong	5th
2009	Bangkok, Thailand	5th
2013	Kuala Lumpur, Malaysia	5th
2017	Kakamigahara, Gifu, Japan	5th
2022	Muscat, Oman	5th
2025	Hangzhou, China	5th

Asian Champions Trophy
Year	Host city	Position
2013	Kakamigahara, Japan	3rd
2016	Singapore	5th
2018	Donghae, South Korea	4th
2021	Donghae, South Korea	Withdrew
2023	Ranchi, India	5th
2024	Rajgir, India	4th
2026	Bhopal, India	Qualified

World League
Year	Host city	Position
2012–13	New Delhi, India	17th
2014–15	Rosario, Argentina	22nd
2016–17	Auckland, New Zealand	20th

Hockey Nations Cup 2
Year	Host city	Position
2024–25	Wałcz, Poland	7th

Commonwealth Games
Year	Host city	Position
1998	Kuala Lumpur, Malaysia	6th
2002	Manchester, England	8th
2006	Melbourne, Australia	5th
2010	New Delhi, India	10th
2014	Glasgow, Scotland	7th
2018	Gold Coast, Queensland, Australia	8th

Southeast Asian Games
Year	Host city	Position
1993	Singapore	2nd
1995	Chiang Mai, Thailand	2nd
1997	Jakarta, Indonesia	1st
1999	Bandar Seri Begawan, Brunei	1st
2001	Kuala Lumpur, Malaysia	1st
2007	Nakhon Ratchasima, Thailand	1st
2013	Naypyidaw, Myanmar	1st
2015	Singapore City, Singapore	1st
2017	Kuala Lumpur, Malaysia	1st
2023	Phnom Penh, Cambodia	1st
2025	Bangkok, Thailand	1st

== Current squad ==
The following players are called for the 2026 Women's Asian Champions Trophy.

Head Coach: (India) C.R Kumar

2. Zati Muhamad
4. Siti Mohd
6. Zawiatul Hartomo
7. Azmyra Azhairy
9. Nurhanie Tarmizi
11. Nur Azhar
12. Nur Mazlan
14. Siti Shaikh
18. Nur Shamine Azureen
19. Insyirah Effarizal
20. Fitrinur Ramlee (GK)
21. Fatin Sukri
23. Dian Nazeri
25. Khairunnisa Mohd
26. Nuramirah Zulkifli
27. Nurmaizatul Syafi
29. Nur Ahmad
32. Nur Zainal (GK)
35. Noor Hasliza Ali (C)
36. Nur Ridzuan

== Results and fixtures ==
The following is a list of match results in the last 12 months, as well as any future matches that have been scheduled.

Win Draw Loss Fixture

=== 2026 ===
==== 2026 Women's FIH Hockey World Cup Qualifiers ====
2 March 2026 Pool B	Ireland	5–0	Malaysia	Santiago, Chile
15:15	Mullan 21'; Perdue 24'; McAuley 34'; M. Carey 37'; Upton 40'	Report		Stadium: Estadio National del Hockey Césped Claudia Schüler

3 March 2026 Pool B	Canada	1–6	Malaysia	Santiago, Chile
13:30	Walton 11'	Report	Hohd 9'; Azhar 20', 28'; Muhammad 36'; Zulkifli 39'; Sukri 46'	Stadium: Estadio Nacional del Hockey Césped Claudia Schüler

5 March 2026 Pool B	Japan	4–0	Malaysia	Santiago, Chile
13:00	Kobayakawa 39', 45'; Murayama 48'; Nakagomi 55'	Report		Stadium: Estadio Nacional del Hockey Césped Claudia Schüler

7 March 2026 5/8 Classification	Malaysia	3–1	Switzerland	Santiago, Chile
11:15	Mohd 25'; Sukri 26'; Azhar 37'	Report	Stomps 43'	Stadium: Estadio Nacional del Hockey Césped Claudia Schüler

8 March 2026 5/6 Classification	France	3–0	Malaysia	Santiago, Chile
11:15	Van der Zanden 1', 57'; Proux 37'	Report		Stadium: Estadio Nacional del Hockey Césped Claudia Schüler

==== Scotland Test series ====
18 July 2026 Test 1	Scotland	6–2	Malaysia	Edinburgh, Scotland
16:00	Watson 10'; Burnet 14'; Mackenzie 23', 28'; Kennedy 24'; Costello 58'	Report	Zulkifli 40'; Mohd 60'	Stadium: Peffermill Playing Fields, The University of Edinburgh

19 July 2026 Test 2	Scotland	6–0	Malaysia	Edinburgh, Scotland
14:00	Costello 13', 29'; Wadsworth 45'; Low 48'; McEwan 53'; Birch 56'	Report		Stadium: Peffermill Playing Fields, The University of Edinburgh

==== 2026 Asian Games ====
18 September 2026 Pool A	Malaysia	5–0	Kazakhstan	Kakamigahara, Japan
19:00	Zulkifli 9', 21'; Mohd 12'; Azhar 17', 49'	Report		Stadium: Gifu Prefectural Green Stadium

21 September 2026 Pool A	Bangladesh	1–3	Malaysia	Kakamigahara, Japan
19:00	Akter 25'	Report	Zulkifli 40', 59'; Muhamad 44'	Stadium: Gifu Prefectural Green Stadium

23 September 2026 Pool A	Malaysia	0–4	China	Kakamigahara, Japan
19:00		Report	Yu 2'; Zhong 25', 44'; Zhang 47'	Stadium: Gifu Prefectural Green Stadium

25 September 2026 Pool A	Chinese Taipei	0–5	Malaysia	Kakamigahara, Japan
19:00		Report	Mohd 9'; Shaikh 10'; Zulkifli 12'; Husain 15+', 50'	Stadium: Gifu Prefectural Green Stadium

27 September 2026 Pool A	Malaysia	1–2	South Korea	Kakamigahara, Japan
15:00	Syafi 60'	Report	Park Seu. 15+'; An 29'	Stadium: Gifu Prefectural Green Stadium

30 September 2026 5/8 Classification	Malaysia	3–0	Indonesia	Kakamigahara, Japan
11:30	Muhamad 20'; Mohd 41', 55'	Report		Stadium: Gifu Prefectural Green Stadium

2 October 2026 5th place match	Malaysia	4–0	Thailand	Kakamigahara, Japan
14:00	Mohd 14', 18'; Azhar 22'; Mazlan 53'	Report		Stadium: Gifu Prefectural Green Stadium

==== 2026 Asian Champions Trophy ====
19 November 2026 Round-robin	India	4–1	Malaysia	Bhopal, India
16:35	Mumtaz 20'; Tete 35'; Puja 39'; Lalremsiami 49'	Report	Zulkifli 19'	Stadium: Barkheda Nathu International Sports Complex

21 November 2026 Round-robin	China	2–2	Malaysia	Bhopal, India
14:30	Wei 35'; Feng. J 41'	Report	Siti 31'; Azhairy 45'	Stadium: Barkheda Nathu International Sports Complex

22 November 2026 Round-robin	South Korea	1–3	Malaysia	Bhopal, India
15:00	Mun 36'	Report	Syafi 33'; Zulkifli 38'; Siti 60'	Stadium: Barkheda Nathu International Sports Complex

24 November 2026 Round-robin	Malaysia	v	Japan	Bhopal, India
16:45				Stadium: Barkheda Nathu International Sports Complex

25 November 2026 Round-robin	Malaysia	v	Thailand	Bhopal, India
14:30				Stadium: Barkheda Nathu International Sports Complex

== See also ==
- Malaysia women's national under-21 field hockey team
- Malaysia men's national field hockey team
