= Chinese Taipei women's national field hockey team =

Chinese Taipei
- Association: Chinese Taipei Hockey Association
- Confederation: AHF (Asia)
- Head Coach: Lin Min Nan; Chen Mei-Chen
- Captain: Pu Agustin-Linmey

FIH ranking
- Current: 40 ▲2 (1 October 2026)

Asian Games
- Appearances: 3 (first in 2006)
- Best result: 6th (2006)

Asia Cup
- Appearances: 4 (first in 2007)
- Best result: 7th (2007, 2013)

The Chinese Taipei women's national field hockey team represents Taiwan in women's international field hockey competitions and is controlled by the Chinese Taipei Hockey Association, the governing body for field hockey in Taiwan.

Taiwan have participated thrice in the Asian Games and four times in the Asia Cup.

== Tournament record ==
=== Asian Games ===
- 2006 – 6th place
- 2018 – 8th place
- 2026 – 7th place

=== Asia Cup ===
- 2007 – 7th place
- 2009 – 9th place
- 2013 – 7th place
- 2025 – 8th place

=== AHF Cup ===
- 1997 – 5th place
- 2012 – (gold)
- 2016 – (bronze)
- 2025 – (silver)

== Current squad ==
The following is the Chinese Taipei roster in the women's field hockey tournament of the 2026 Asian Games.

Head coach: (Chinese Taipei) Lin Min Nan

2. Wang Yu-Chiu
3. Tsai Chen Wei
5. Liao Pei-Shan
7. Huang Pei-Lun
8. Chen Ting-Chun
9. Yang Wan Wen
10. Pu Agustin-Linmey (C)
11. Fan Hui-Yun
12. Lai Ya-Han
13. Chang, Tzu-Ling
14. Mao I-Hsuan
15. Huang Yu-Ting
17. Zhu Yi-Chun
18. Lo Tzu-Yin (GK)
19. Wang Shih-Han
20. Ye Shu-Qin
23. Chang Chih-Hsien
24. Wang Wen-Tsen
26. Yao Wen-Xuan (GK)

== Results and fixtures ==
The following is a list of match results in the last 12 months, as well as any future matches that have been scheduled.

Win Draw Loss Fixture

=== 2026 ===
==== 2026 Asian Games Women's Qualifier ====
23 April 2026 Pool A	Chinese Taipei	5–5	Bangladesh	Jakarta, Indonesia
17:30	Zhu 9'; Liao 23'; Fan 29'; Huang 34', 36'	Report	Riya 8'; Pal 10', 17', 44'; Akter 40'	Stadium: GBK Hockey Field

24 April 2026 Pool A	Chinese Taipei	1–0	Hong Kong	Jakarta, Indonesia
15:00	Pu 60+'	Report		Stadium: GBK Hockey Field

26 April 2026 Pool A	Uzbekistan	3–3	Chinese Taipei	Jakarta, Indonesia
20:00	Khaydarova 25'; Demina 39'; Semyonova 60'	Report	Mao 5'; Fan 37'; Lai 48'	Stadium: GBK Hockey Field

28 March 2026 Semi-final	Indonesia	2–3	Chinese Taipei	Jakarta, Indonesia
17:30	Aditiya 14'; Maulani 34'	Report	Zhu 19'; Lai 39', 43'	Stadium: GBK Hockey Field

29 April 2026 Final	Bangladesh	1–3	Chinese Taipei	Jakarta, Indonesia
20:00	Pal 8'	Report	Wang 17'; Mao 32'; Huang 40'	Stadium: GBK Hockey Field

==== 2026 Asian Games ====
18 September 2026 Pool A	South Korea	3–1	Chinese Taipei	Kakamigahara, Japan
13:00	Park 13', 33'; An 42'	Report	Wang 41'	Stadium: Gifu Prefectural Green Stadium

21 September 2026 Pool A	China	10–0	Chinese Taipei	Kakamigahara, Japan
11:00	Chen Yi 7', 32', 32'; Zhong 23', 34'; Zhang 39'; Ma 54'; Fan 55'; Chen Ya. 57'; Yu 58'	Report		Stadium: Gifu Prefectural Green Stadium

23 September 2026 Pool A	Kazakhstan	1–4	Chinese Taipei	Kakamigahara, Japan
13:00	Lobanova 31'	Report	Huang 5', 60'; Fan 32'; Wang Y. 58'	Stadium: Gifu Prefectural Green Stadium

27 September 2026 Pool A	Malaysia	0–5	South Korea	Kakamigahara, Japan
15:00		Report	Mohd 9'; Shaikh 10'; Zulkifli 12'; Husain 15+', 50'	Stadium: Gifu Prefectural Green Stadium

27 September 2026 Pool A	Chinese Taipei	3–2	Bangladesh	Kakamigahara, Japan
13:00	Huang 6', 49'; Wang Y. 45'	Report	Akter 19', 24'	Stadium: Gifu Prefectural Green Stadium

30 September 2026 5/8 Classification	Thailand	2–1	Chinese Taipei	Kakamigahara, Japan
14:00	Smeelen 13'; Inpa 47'	Report	Huang 38'	Stadium: Gifu Prefectural Green Stadium

2 October 2026 7th place match	Indonesia	1–1 (3–4 p)	Chinese Taipei	Kakamigahara, Japan
11:30	Aditiya 40'	Report	Lai 5'	Stadium: Gifu Prefectural Green Stadium
	Penalties
	Lispa (penalty shoot-out missed); Rahayu (penalty shoot-out missed); Indira (penalty shoot-out scored); Prasasti (penalty shoot-out scored); Aditiya (penalty shoot-out scored); Indira (penalty shoot-out missed); Prasasti (penalty shoot-out missed)		(penalty shoot-out missed) Huang; (penalty shoot-out scored) Lai; (penalty shoot-out scored) Wang; (penalty shoot-out scored) Chang; (penalty shoot-out missed) Fan; (penalty shoot-out missed) Wang; (penalty shoot-out scored) Chang

== See also ==
- Chinese Taipei men's national field hockey team
