= 1985 Women's Hockey Asia Cup =

International field hockey tournament

Tournament details
- Host country: South Korea
- City: Seoul
- Dates: September 20–25
- Teams: 6 (from 1 confederation)
- Venue: Hyochang Stadium

Final positions
- Champions: South Korea (1st title)
- Runner-up: Japan
- Third place: Malaysia

Tournament statistics
- Matches played: 15
- Goals scored: 80 (5.33 per match)

The 1985 Women's Hockey Asia Cup was the first edition of the Women's Hockey Asia Cup. It was held in Seoul, South Korea from 20 September to 25 September 1985.

South Korea won the group to win the title, with Japan finishing second while Malaysia took the third place.

== Teams ==
- Hong Kong
- Japan
- Malaysia
- Singapore
- South Korea
- Thailand

== Results ==
=== Table ===
Pos	Team	Pld	W	D	L	GF	GA	GD	Pts
1	South Korea (H)	5	5	0	0	31	3	+28	10
2	Japan	5	3	1	1	25	6	+19	7
3	Malaysia	5	3	1	1	10	4	+6	7
4	Singapore	5	2	0	3	9	19	−10	4
5	Thailand	5	1	0	4	2	28	−26	2
6	Hong Kong	5	0	0	5	3	20	−17	0

Source: Todor66
(H) Hosts

=== Matches ===
20 September 1985

South Korea	7–0	Singapore

20 September 1985

Japan	7–1	Hong Kong

20 September 1985

Malaysia	4–0	Thailand

21 September 1985

Japan	6–0	Thailand

21 September 1985

Malaysia	1–0	Singapore

21 September 1985

South Korea	5–0	Hong Kong

23 September 1985

Japan	10–0	Singapore

23 September 1985

South Korea	2–1	Malaysia

23 September 1985

Thailand	1–0	Hong Kong

24 September 1985

Singapore	4–1	Hong Kong

24 September 1985

South Korea	13–1	Thailand

24 September 1985

Japan	1–1	Malaysia

25 September 1985

Malaysia	3–1	Hong Kong

25 September 1985

Singapore	5–0	Thailand

25 September 1985

South Korea	4–1	Japan

== Winners ==
1985 Women's Hockey Asia Cup winners

South Korea
First title

== Final standings ==
Rank	Team
1st place, gold medalist(s)	South Korea
2nd place, silver medalist(s)	Japan
3rd place, bronze medalist(s)	Malaysia
4	Singapore
5	Thailand
6	Hong Kong

== See also ==
- 1985 Men's Hockey Asia Cup
