= Sri Lanka women's national field hockey team =

Sri Lankan sports team

Sri Lanka
- Association: Sri Lanka Hockey Federation
- Confederation: AHF (Asia)
- Head Coach: Botheju Welathanthirige
- Captain: Sharmen Jones

FIH ranking
- Current: 70 (23 September 2026)

Asian Games
- Appearances: 0

Asia Cup
- Appearances: 2 (first in 2004)
- Best result: 8th (2004)
Medal record
South Asian Games
Silver medal – second place	2016 Guwahati	Team

The Sri Lanka women's national field hockey team represents Sri Lanka at international field hockey competitions for women. Sri Lanka is currently ranked 70th in the world. The women's team was eligible to contest in the Women's FIH Hockey World League for the first time in its history after making its first appearance in the 2016–17 Women's FIH Hockey World League. Sri Lanka competed in the Round 1 (Asian category) of the Hockey World League for the season 2016-17 and they were knocked out of the first round claiming only 2 wins out of 6 pool matches.

Sri Lankan women's field hockey team also secured a silver medal in the field hockey competition which was part of the 2016 South Asian Games after losing to favourites India in the finals by a huge margin. It was also the first ever women's field hockey tournament to have contested in the South Asian Games.

In 2003, Sri Lankan women team also won a silver medal in the AHF Women's field hockey tournament.

== Tournament record ==
=== Asian Games ===
- 2022 – Withdrew

=== Asia Cup ===
- 2004 – 8th
- 2009 – 11th

=== AHF Cup ===
- 1997 – 4th
- 2003 – (silver)
- 2012 – 4th
- 2016 – 6th
- 2025 – 5th

=== Hockey World League ===
World League record
Year	Result	Pld	W	D*	L	GS	GA
(Singapore) 2016-17	Group stage	6	2	0	4	21	21

=== South Asian Games ===
South Asian Games record
Year	Result	Pld	W	D*	L	GS	GA
(India) 2016	Runners-up	2	1	0	1	16	12

== Results and fixtures ==
The following is a list of match results in the last 12 months, as well as any future matches that have been scheduled.

Win Draw Loss Fixture

=== 2026 ===
==== 2026 Asian Games Women's Qualifier ====
23 March 2026 Pool B	Singapore	2–1	Sri Lanka	Jakarta, Indonesia
20:00	Ng 16'; Sim 59'	Report	Kaluarachchi 18'	Stadium: GBK Hockey Field

24 March 2026 Pool B	Sri Lanka	1–3	Indonesia	Jakarta, Indonesia
20:00	Kumari 40'	Report	Maulani 4', 30'; Destian 23'	Stadium: GBK Hockey Field

26 March 2026 Pool B	Sri Lanka	3–2	Kazakhstan	Jakarta, Indonesia
12:30	Gangedura 19'; Kumari 38'; Sandali 48'	Report	Chepkassova 42'; Yersultan 49'	Stadium: GBK Hockey Field

28 April 2026 5/8 Classification	Sri Lanka	1–6	Uzbekistan	Jakarta, Indonesia
12:30	Kaluarachchi 28'	Report	Demina 30', 30', 38', 45'; Yubko 31'; Semyonova 49'	Stadium: GBK Hockey Field

29 April 2026 7/8 Classification	Hong Kong	6–2	Sri Lanka	Jakarta, Indonesia
12:30	T. Chan 8'; Lau 12', 49', 53'; Cheung 32', 60'	Report	Kumari 14'; Divyanjali 45+'	Stadium: GBK Hockey Field
