= Thailand women's national field hockey team =

National sports team

Thailand
- Association: Thailand Hockey Association
- Confederation: Asian Hockey Federation
- Head Coach: Bae Young-wook
- Assistant coach(es): Boonta Duangurai
- Manager: Chanapat Cheysombatti
- Captain: Supansa Samanso

FIH ranking
- Current: 28 ▼1 (3 October 2026)

Asian Games
- Appearances: 7 (first in 1986)
- Best result: 5th (1986)

Asia Cup
- Appearances: 7 (first in 1985)
- Best result: 5th (1985)

The Thailand women's national field hockey team represents Thailand in international field hockey competitions.

== Tournament record ==
=== Asian Games ===
- 1986 – 5th
- 1998 – 7th
- 2010 – 6th
- 2014 – 7th
- 2018 – 6th
- 2022 – 6th
- 2026 – 6th

=== Asia Cup ===
- 1985 – 5th
- 1993 – 7th
- 2007 – 6th
- 2009 – 10th
- 2017 – 6th
- 2022 – 6th
- 2025 – 7th

=== AHF Cup ===
- 2003 – 5th
- 2012 – (bronze)
- 2016 – (gold)

=== Asian Champions Trophy ===
- 2021 – 4th
- 2023 – 6th
- 2024 – 6th
- 2026 – Qualified

=== Hockey World League ===
- 2014–15 – 24th
- 2016–17 – 27th

== Current squad ==
The following squad was announced for the 2026 Women's Asian Champions Trophy.

Head Coach: (South Korea) Young Wook Bae

1. Nantikarn Bunrit (GK)
4. Suwapat Konthong
5. Kunthida Khamsangwan
6. Marisa Al Mass
7. Kunjira Inpa
8. Sudarat Noo-Keaw
9. Arucha Komolwit
10. Jiratchaya Todkaew
11. Natthakarn Aunjai
13. Supansa Samanso (C)
14. Sawita Kakkaeo
15. Songkran Pasawat
17. Nadia Smeelen
17. Trinetr Jirapitsatja
18. Siraya Yimkrajang (GK)
19. Phimphakan Phakdeengam
25. Marisah Mock
33. Ariya Mock

== Results and fixtures ==
The following is a list of match results in the last 12 months, as well as any future matches that have been scheduled.

Win Draw Loss Fixture

=== 2026 ===
==== 9th Women's Hockey Invitational Tournament ====
6 March 2026 Round robin	Thailand	1–1	Singapore	Kowloon, Hong Kong
15:15	Konthong 36'	Report	Ng 32'	Stadium: King's Park

7 March 2026 Round robin	Thailand	4–0	Indonesia	Kowloon, Hong Kong
13:45	Jirapitisatja 38'; Aunjai 44', 45', 58'	Report		Stadium: King's Park

8 March 2026 Round robin	Hong Kong	1–1	Thailand	Kowloon, Hong Kong
14:30	Lau 57'	Report	Konthong 29'	Stadium: King's Park

==== 2026 Asian Games ====
18 September 2026 Pool B	Thailand	2–0	Singapore	Kakamigahara, Japan
15:00	Komolwit 50'; Inpa 57'	Report		Stadium: Gifu Prefectural Green Stadium

21 September 2026 Pool B	Uzbekistan	1–3	Thailand	Kakamigahara, Japan
15:00	Khujaeva 17'	Report	Konthong 10'; Inpa 26'; Jirapitisatja 40'	Stadium: Gifu Prefectural Green Stadium

23 September 2026 Pool B	Thailand	1–20	India	Kakamigahara, Japan
15:00	Samanso 57'	Report	Deepika 2', 8', 9', 24', 33', 36', 39', 51', 57'; Navneet 4', 29', 35', 51'; Pisal 10', 11', 47'; Neha 19'; Lalremsiami 26'; Rana 29'; Tete 45'	Stadium: Gifu Prefectural Green Stadium

25 September 2026 Pool B	Indonesia	1–0	Thailand	Kakamigahara, Japan
15:00	Maulani 38'	Report		Stadium: Gifu Prefectural Green Stadium

27 September 2026 Pool B	Thailand	0–3	Japan	Kakamigahara, Japan
17:00		Report	Nakagomi 10', 23'; Saito 54'	Stadium: Gifu Prefectural Green Stadium

30 September 2026 5/8 Classification	Thailand	2–1	Chinese Taipei	Kakamigahara, Japan
14:00	Smeelen 13'; Inpa 47'	Report	Huang 38'	Stadium: Gifu Prefectural Green Stadium

2 October 2026 5th place match	Malaysia	4–0	Thailand	Kakamigahara, Japan
14:00	Mohd 14', 18'; Azhar 22'; Mazlan 53'	Report		Stadium: Gifu Prefectural Green Stadium

==== 2026 Asian Champions Trophy ====
19 November 2026 Round-robin	China	7–0	Thailand	Bhopal, India
12:05	Feng 27', 32'; Deng 28', 42'; Wei 33'; Chen. Y 38'; Zhang. H 56'	Report		Stadium: Barkheda Nathu International Sports Complex

21 November 2026 Round-robin	Thailand	0–3	Japan	Bhopal, India
16:45		Report	Sasaki 9', 23'; Yamamoto 41'	Stadium: Barkheda Nathu International Sports Complex

22 November 2026 Round-robin	Thailand	0–7	India	Bhopal, India
17:15		Report	Navneet 4', 56'; Deepika 10', 11', 56'; Mumtaz 28'; Toppo 32'	Stadium: Barkheda Nathu International Sports Complex

24 November 2026 Round-robin	South Korea	v	Thailand	Bhopal, India
14:30				Stadium: Barkheda Nathu International Sports Complex

25 November 2026 Round-robin	Malaysia	v	Thailand	Bhopal, India
14:30				Stadium: Barkheda Nathu International Sports Complex

== See also ==
- Thailand men's national field hockey team
