= Women's Hockey Asia Cup =

International field hockey tournament

- Current season, competition or edition: 2025 Women's Hockey Asia Cup
- Sport: Field hockey
- Founded: 1985; 41 years ago
- First season: 1985
- No. of teams: 8
- Confederation: Asian Hockey Federation
- Most recent champion: China (3rd title) (2025)
- Most titles: China; South Korea; Japan (3 titles)
- Qualification: AHF Cup
- Related competitions: Asian Games

The Women's Hockey Asia Cup is a women's international field hockey tournament organized by the Asian Hockey Federation. The winning team becomes the champion of Asia and qualifies for the FIH Hockey World Cup.

Japan are the defending champions winning the 2022 edition. South Korea and Japan have won the most titles with three each. India and China are the next with two titles won each.

The hosts together with six highest-ranked teams from the previous edition are qualified directly for the tournament, they are joined by the top team from the Women's AHF Cup or the top two teams, if the host is already qualified.

== Results ==
#	Year	Host	Final			Third place match			Teams
#	Year	Host	Winner	Score	Runner-up	Third place	Score	Fourth place	Teams
1	1985; Details	Seoul, South Korea	South Korea	Round-robin	Japan	Malaysia	Round-robin	Singapore	6
2	1989; Details	Hong Kong	China	Round-robin	Japan	South Korea	Round-robin	India	5
3	1993; Details	Hiroshima, Japan	South Korea	3–0	China	India	1–0	Japan	7
4	1999; Details	New Delhi, India	South Korea	3–2	India	China	1–0	Japan	6
5	2004; Details	New Delhi, India	India	1–0	Japan	China	0–0 (a.e.t.) (3–0 p.s.o.)	South Korea	8
6	2007; Details	Hong Kong	Japan	1–1 (a.e.t.) (7–6 p.s.o.)	South Korea	China	4–2	India	9
7	2009; Details	Bangkok, Thailand	China	5–3	India	South Korea	4–3	Japan	11
8	2013; Details	Kuala Lumpur, Malaysia	Japan	2–1	South Korea	India	2–2 (a.e.t.) (3–2 p.s.o.)	China	8
9	2017; Details	Kakamigahara, Japan	India	1–1 (5–4 p.s.o.)	China	South Korea	1–0	Japan	8
10	2022; Details	Muscat, Oman	Japan	4–2	South Korea	India	2–0	China	8
11	2025; Details	Hangzhou, China	China	4–1	India	Japan	2–1	South Korea	8

== Summary ==
Team	Winners	Runners-up	Third place	Fourth place
South Korea	3 (1985*, 1993, 1999)	3 (2007, 2013, 2022)	3 (1989, 2009, 2017)	2 (2004, 2025)
Japan	3 (2007, 2013, 2022)	3 (1985, 1989, 2004)	1 (2025)	4 (1993*, 1999, 2009, 2017*)
China	3 (1989, 2009, 2025*)	2 (1993, 2017)	3 (1999, 2004, 2007)	2 (2013, 2022)
India	2 (2004*, 2017)	3 (1999*, 2009, 2025)	3 (1993, 2013, 2022)	2 (1989, 2007)
Malaysia			1 (1985)	
Singapore				1 (1985)

* = hosts

== Team appearances ==
Team	(South Korea) 1985	(Hong Kong) 1989	(Japan) 1993	(India) 1999	(India) 2004	(Hong Kong) 2007	(Thailand) 2009	(Malaysia) 2013	(Japan) 2017	(Oman) 2022	(China) 2025	Total
China	–	1st	2nd	3rd	3rd	3rd	1st	4th	2nd	4th	1st	10
Chinese Taipei	–	–	–	–	–	7th	9th	7th	–	–	8th	4
Hong Kong	6th	5th	–	–	–	8th	7th	8th	–	–	–	5
India	–	4th	3rd	2nd	1st	4th	2nd	3rd	1st	3rd	2nd	10
Indonesia	–	–	–	–	–	–	–	–	–	8th	–	1
Japan	2nd	2nd	4th	4th	2nd	1st	4th	1st	4th	1st	3rd	11
Kazakhstan	part of USSR		–	5th	5th	–	6th	6th	7th	–	–	5
Malaysia	3rd	–	–	6th	6th	5th	5th	5th	5th	5th	5th	9
Singapore	4th	–	6th	–	7th	9th	8th	–	8th	7th	6th	8
South Korea	1st	3rd	1st	1st	4th	2nd	3rd	2nd	3rd	2nd	4th	11
Sri Lanka	–	–	–	–	8th	–	11th	–	–	–	–	2
Thailand	5th	–	7th	–	–	6th	10th	–	6th	6th	7th	7
Uzbekistan	part of USSR		5th	–	–	–	–	–	–	–	–	1
Total (13)	6	5	7	6	8	9	11	8	8	8	8	

== Debut of teams ==
Year	Debutants	Total
1985	Hong Kong, Japan, Malaysia, Singapore, South Korea, Thailand	6
1989	China, India	2
1993	Uzbekistan	1
1999	Kazakhstan	1
2004	Sri Lanka	1
2007	Chinese Taipei	1
2009	—N/a	0
2013	—N/a	0
2017	—N/a	0
2022	Indonesia	1
2025	—N/a	0
Total		13

== See also ==
- Field hockey at the Asian Games
- Men's Hockey Asia Cup
- Women's AHF Cup
- Women's Asian Champions Trophy
- Women's Hockey Junior Asia Cup
- Women's Hockey U18 Asia Cup
- Women's Indoor Hockey Asia Cup
