= Kazakhstan women's national field hockey team =

Kazakhstan
- Association: Kazakhstan Hockey Federation
- Confederation: AHF (Asia)
- Head Coach: Nurzhan Beibitov
- Manager: Serik Kalimbayev
- Captain: Guzal Bakhavaddin

FIH ranking
- Current: 52 ▼12 (28 September 2026)

Asian Games
- Appearances: 6 (first in 1998)
- Best result: 6th (1998, 2014)

Asia Cup
- Appearances: 5 (first in 1999)
- Best result: 5th (1999, 2004)

The Kazakhstan women's national field hockey team represents Kazakhstan in women's international field hockey competitions.

== Tournament history ==
=== Asian Games ===
Field hockey at the Asian Games
Year	Rank	M	W	D	L	GF	GA	GD
1982-1994	DNE							
(Thailand) 1998	6th place	7	1	1	5	8	27	-19
2002-2006	DNE							
(China) 2010	7th place	6	0	0	6	3	36	-33
(South Korea) 2014	6th place	4	1	0	3	5	27	-22
(Indonesia) 2018	10th place	5	1	0	4	4	34	-30
(China) 2022	8th place	5	1	0	4	2	26	-24
(Japan) 2026	11th place	6	0	2	4	5	36	-31
Total	6/12	33	4	3	26	27	186	-159

=== Asia Cup ===
Women's Hockey Asia Cup
Year	Rank	M	W	D	L	GF	GA	GD
1985-1993	DNE							
(India) 1999	5th place	6	2	0	4	8	31	-23
(India) 2004	5th place	5	1	1	3	6	15	-9
2007	DNE							
(Thailand) 2009	6th place	7	4	0	3	16	32	-16
(Malaysia) 2013	6th place	5	2	0	3	10	29	-19
(Japan) 2017	7th place	6	1	0	5	6	26	-20
2022	DNE							
Total	5/10	29	10	1	18	46	133	-87

=== AHF Cup ===
- 1997 – (gold)

=== Hockey World League ===
Women's FIH Hockey World League
Year	Rank	M	W	D	L	GF	GA	GD
2012–13	26th place	8	3	0	5	18	43	-25
2014–15	29th place	11	7	0	4	30	30	0
2016–17	32nd place	12	5	2	5	36	38	-2
Total	3/3	31	15	2	14	84	111	-27

=== FIH Hockey Series ===
- 2018–19 – First round

=== AHF Central Asia Cup ===
- 2024 – (gold)
- 2025 – (bronze)

=== Indoor World Cup ===
Women's Indoor Hockey World Cup
Year	Rank	M	W	D	L	GF	GA	GD
(Germany) 2003	DNE							
(Austria) 2007	DNE							
(Poland) 2011	12th place	6	0	0	6	5	28	-23
(Germany) 2015	12th place	7	0	1	6	16	53	-37
(Germany) 2018	12th place	6	0	0	6	4	37	-33
(South Africa) 2023	10th place	6	1	2	3	17	28	-11
Total	4/6	25	1	3	21	42	146	-104

== Results and fixtures ==
The following is a list of match results in the last 12 months, as well as any future matches that have been scheduled.

Win Draw Loss Fixture

=== 2026 ===
==== 2026 Asian Games Women's Qualifier ====
23 March 2026 Pool B	Kazakhstan	1–2	Indonesia	Jakarta, Indonesia
15:00	Lobanova 10'	Report	Lispa 7'; Naiborhu 11'	Stadium: GBK Hockey Field

24 April 2026 Pool B	Kazakhstan	1–2	Singapore	Jakarta, Indonesia
17:30	Lobanova 17'	Report	Ong 17'; Tay 22'	Stadium: GBK Hockey Field

26 March 2026 Pool B	Sri Lanka	3–2	Kazakhstan	Jakarta, Indonesia
12:00	Gangedura 19'; Kumari 38'; Sandali 48'	Report	Chepkassova 42'; Yersultan 49'	Stadium: GBK Hockey Field

28 April 2026 5/8 Classification	Hong Kong	0–0 (3–4 p)	Kazakhstan	Jakarta, Indonesia
15:00		Report		Stadium: GBK Hockey Field
	Penalties
	Lau (penalty shoot-out scored); Wong (penalty shoot-out missed); McNeil (penalty shoot-out missed); Chan (penalty shoot-out scored); T. Chan (penalty shoot-out missed); T. Chan (penalty shoot-out scored); Chan (penalty shoot-out missed)		(penalty shoot-out scored) Gataulina; (penalty shoot-out missed) Domashneva; (penalty shoot-out missed) Lobanova; (penalty shoot-out scored) Lyapina; (penalty shoot-out missed) Khairusheva; (penalty shoot-out scored) Gataulina; (penalty shoot-out scored) Domashneva

29 April 2026 5/6 Classification	Kazakhstan	1–1 (2–0 p)	Uzbekistan	Jakarta, Indonesia
15:00	Lobanova 26'	Report	Khujaeva 51'	Stadium: GBK Hockey Field
	Penalties
	Gataulina (penalty shoot-out missed); Domashneva (penalty shoot-out scored); Lyapina (penalty shoot-out scored)		(penalty shoot-out missed) Demina; (penalty shoot-out missed) Yubko; (penalty shoot-out missed) Khaydarova; (penalty shoot-out missed) Khujaeva

==== 2026 Asian Games ====
18 September 2026 Pool A	Malaysia	5–0	Kazakhstan	Kakamigahara, Japan
19:00	Zulkifli 9', 21'; Mohd 12'; Azhar 17', 49'	Report		Stadium: Gifu Prefectural Green Stadium

21 September 2026 Pool A	South Korea	7–0	Kazakhstan	Kakamigahara, Japan
09:00	Park Mi. 1'; An 28'; Kim J. 29'; Lee 31'; Choi 39'; Park Seu. 39'; Jung 40'	Report		Stadium: Gifu Prefectural Green Stadium

23 September 2026 Pool A	Kazakhstan	1–4	Chinese Taipei	Kakamigahara, Japan
13:00	Lobanova 31'	Report	Huang 5', 60'; Fan 32'; Wang Y. 58'	Stadium: Gifu Prefectural Green Stadium

25 September 2026 Pool A	Kazakhstan	3–3	Bangladesh	Kakamigahara, Japan
09:00	Lobanova 21', 32', 37'	Report	Riya 2'; Akter 40'; Pal 47'	Stadium: Gifu Prefectural Green Stadium

27 September 2026 Pool A	China	16–0	Kazakhstan	Kakamigahara, Japan
09:00	Yu 8', 28', 29'; Chen Ya. 16'; Zhang 23', 24', 24'; Zhong 23', 27'; Dan 44', 49'; Chen Yi 51', 59'; Li H. 56'; Zou 57'; Fan 58'	Report		Stadium: Gifu Prefectural Green Stadium

30 September 2026 11th place match	Kazakhstan	1–1 (4–2 p)	Uzbekistan	Kakamigahara, Japan
09:00	Lobanova 9'	Report	Demina 33'	Stadium: Gifu Prefectural Green Stadium
	Penalties
	Gataulina (penalty shoot-out scored); Gataulina (penalty shoot-out scored); Lobanova (penalty shoot-out scored); Domashneva (penalty shoot-out scored)		(penalty shoot-out scored) Demina; (penalty shoot-out scored) Khaytboeva; (penalty shoot-out missed) Semyonova; (penalty shoot-out missed) Zaripova

== Current squad ==
The following is the Kazakhstan roster in the women's field hockey tournament of the 2026 Asian Games.

Head coach: (Kazakhstan) Serik Kalimbayev

1. Guzal Bakhavaddin (C,GK)
2. Viktoriya Shaimardanova
3. Dilnaz Khairusheva
4. Albina Dymchan
5. Natalya Sazontova
7. Viktoriya Lyapina
9. Uilbolsyn Zhetkergenova
10. Vera Domasheva
11. Ismira Apsatarova
12. Karlygash Bolganbayeva
14. Munira Temirgaliyeva
15. Natalya Gataulina
16. Dilnaz Olzhabayeva (GK)
17. Zhanel Izbassar
18. Viktoriya Lobanova
19. Assel Omirkhankyzy
20. Azkhan Yersultan
22. Gulsina Izbassarova
24. Eteliya Mailyan
29. Elvira Lutsenko

== See also ==
- Kazakhstan men's national field hockey team
