= Hong Kong women's national field hockey team =

National field hockey team of Hong Kong

Hong Kong
- Association: Hong Kong Hockey Association
- Confederation: AHF (Asia)
- Head Coach: Tsoanelo Pholo
- Captain: Kirsten McNeil

FIH ranking
- Current: 33 ▲1 (10 March 2026)

Asian Games
- Appearances: 6 (first in 1982)
- Best result: 6th (1982, 1986)

Asia Cup
- Appearances: 5 (first in 1985)
- Best result: 5th (1989)

The Hong Kong women's national field hockey team represents Hong Kong in international women's field hockey competitions.

== Tournament record ==
=== Asian Games ===
- 1982 – 6th
- 1986 – 6th
- 2006 – 7th
- 2014 – 8th
- 2018 – 9th
- 2022 – 9th

=== Asia Cup ===
- 1985 – 6th
- 1989 – 5th
- 2007 – 8th
- 2009 – 7th
- 2013 – 8th

=== AHF Cup ===
- 1997 – 6th
- 2003 – (gold)
- 2012 – (silver)
- 2016 – 5th
- 2025 – (bronze)

=== Hockey World League ===
- 2014–15 – Round 1
- 2016–17 – 35th

=== FIH Hockey Series ===
- 2018–19 – First round

== Results and fixtures ==
The following is a list of match results in the last 12 months, as well as any future matches that have been scheduled.

Win Draw Loss Fixture

=== 2026 ===
==== 9th Women's Hockey Invitational Tournament ====
6 March 2026 Round robin	Hong Kong	2–0	Indonesia	Kowloon, Hong Kong
19:45	Chan 10'; T. Chan 50'	Report		Stadium: King's Park

7 March 2026 Round robin	Singapore	2–2	Hong Kong	Kowloon, Hong Kong
16:00	Sim 24'; Ng 31'	Report	Lee 25'; T. Chan 28'	Stadium: King's Park

8 March 2026 Round robin	Hong Kong	1–1	Thailand	Kowloon, Hong Kong
14:30	Lau 57'	Report	Konthong 29'	Stadium: King's Park

==== 2026 Asian Games Women's Qualifier ====
23 April 2026 Pool A	Hong Kong	5–0; Forfeit	Uzbekistan	Jakarta, Indonesia
12:30		Report	Yubko 3', 40'; Semyonova 10', 39'	Stadium: GBK Hockey Field

24 April 2026 Pool A	Chinese Taipei	1–0	Hong Kong	Jakarta, Indonesia
15:00	Pu 60+'	Report		Stadium: GBK Hockey Field

26 April 2026 Pool A	Hong Kong	1–2	Bangladesh	Jakarta, Indonesia
17:30	Law 1'	Report	Nadira 10'; Akter 39'	Stadium: GBK Hockey Field

28 April 2026 5/8 Classification	Hong Kong	0–0 (3–4 p)	Kazakhstan	Jakarta, Indonesia
15:00		Report		Stadium: GBK Hockey Field
	Penalties
	Lau (penalty shoot-out scored); Wong (penalty shoot-out missed); McNeil (penalty shoot-out missed); Chan (penalty shoot-out scored); T. Chan (penalty shoot-out missed); T. Chan (penalty shoot-out scored); Chan (penalty shoot-out missed)		(penalty shoot-out scored) Gataulina; (penalty shoot-out missed) Domashneva; (penalty shoot-out missed) Lobanova; (penalty shoot-out scored) Lyapina; (penalty shoot-out missed) Khairusheva; (penalty shoot-out scored) Gataulina; (penalty shoot-out scored) Domashneva

29 April 2026 7/8 Classification	Hong Kong	6–2	Sri Lanka	Jakarta, Indonesia
12:30	T. Chan 8'; Lau 12', 49', 53'; Cheung 32', 60'	Report	Kumari 14'; Divyanjali 45+'	Stadium: GBK Hockey Field

== See also ==
- Hong Kong men's national field hockey team
