= 1989 Women's Hockey Asia Cup =

International field hockey tournament

Tournament details
- Host country: Hong Kong
- City: Hong Kong
- Dates: December 12–17
- Teams: 5 (from 1 confederation)

Final positions
- Champions: China (1st title)
- Runner-up: Japan
- Third place: South Korea

Tournament statistics
- Matches played: 9
- Goals scored: 38 (4.22 per match)

The 1989 Women's Hockey Asia Cup was the second edition of the Women's Hockey Asia Cup. It was held in Hong Kong from 12 December to 17 December 1985.

China won the group to win the title, with Japan finishing second while South Korea took the third place.

== Teams ==
- China
- Hong Kong
- India
- Japan
- South Korea

== Results ==
=== Table ===
Pos	Team	Pld	W	D	L	GF	GA	GD	Pts
1	China	4	4	0	0	13	0	+13	8
2	Japan	3	2	0	1	14	4	+10	4
3	South Korea	3	2	0	1	7	1	+6	4
4	India	4	1	0	3	4	11	−7	2
5	Hong Kong (H)	4	0	0	4	0	22	−22	0

Source: Todor66
(H) Hosts

=== Matches ===
12 December 1989

Japan	–	South Korea

12 December 1989

India	2–0	Hong Kong

13 December 1989

Japan	8–0	Hong Kong

13 December 1989

China	2–0	India

14 December 1989

South Korea	3–0	India

14 December 1989

China	8–0	Hong Kong

16 December 1989

China	2–0	Japan

16 December 1989

South Korea	4–0	Hong Kong

17 December 1989

China	1–0	South Korea

17 December 1989

Japan	6–2	India

== Winners ==
1989 Women's Hockey Asia Cup winners

China
First title

== Final standings ==
Rank	Team
1st place, gold medalist(s)	China
2nd place, silver medalist(s)	Japan
3rd place, bronze medalist(s)	South Korea
4	India
5	Hong Kong

== See also ==
- 1989 Men's Hockey Asia Cup
