= Singapore women's national field hockey team =

National sports team

Singapore
- Association: Singapore Hockey Federation
- Confederation: AHF (Asia)
- Head Coach: Henry Wong
- Assistant coach(es): Sunil Prasad Eyamo
- Manager: Luo Yingying
- Captain: Sardonna Ng

FIH ranking
- Current: 41 ▼3 (1 October 2026)

Asian Games
- Appearances: 5 (first in 1982)
- Best result: 5th (1982)

Asia Cup
- Appearances: 8 (first in 1985)
- Best result: 4th (1985)

The Singapore women's national field hockey team represents Singapore in international field hockey competitions.

== Tournament record ==
=== Asian Games ===
- 1982 – 5th
- 1990 – 6th
- 1994 – 6th
- 2022 – 7th
- 2026 – 10th

=== Asia Cup ===
- 1985 – 4th
- 1993 – 6th
- 2004 – 7th
- 2007 – 9th
- 2009 – 8th
- 2017 – 8th
- 2022 – 7th
- 2025 – 6th

=== AHF Cup ===
- 1997 – (silver)
- 2003 – (bronze)
- 2012 – 5th
- 2016 – (silver)
- 2025 – (gold)

=== FIH Hockey Series ===
- 2018–19 – First round

== Current squad ==
The following is the Singapore roster in the women's field hockey tournament of the 2026 Asian Games.

Head Coach: (Singapore) Henry Wong

1. Taylor Liu (GK)
4. Ally Zuraiddy
5. Jolene Ng
6. Tiffany Ong
7. Xiao Qian Kwek
8. Phylicia Tanandika
9. Nadiah Kie Hwee Ong
11. Puay Ho
12. Chloe Loh
14. Li Min Toh
15. Dayana Ong
17. Cheryll Chia
18. Felissa Lai (GK)
20. Sardonna Ng (C)
21. Wei Lin Chan
22. Valerie Tay
23. Elliea Rizal
24. Ivy Chan
28. Cindy Ong
77. Valerie Sim (C)

== Results and fixtures ==
The following is a list of match results in the last 12 months, as well as any future matches that have been scheduled.

Win Draw Loss Fixture

=== 2026 ===
==== 9th Women's Hockey Invitational Tournament ====
6 March 2026 Round robin	Thailand	1–1	Singapore	Kowloon, Hong Kong
15:15	Konthong 36'	Report	S. Ng 32'	Stadium: King's Park

7 March 2026 Round robin	Singapore	2–2	Hong Kong	Kowloon, Hong Kong
16:00	Sim 24'; J. Ng 31'	Report	Lee 25'; T. Chan 28'	Stadium: King's Park

8 March 2026 Round robin	Singapore	1–5	Indonesia	Kowloon, Hong Kong
10:00	Sim 57'	Report	Prasasti 3', 46'; Maulani 8'; Vinynda 10'; Rahayu 32'	Stadium: King's Park

==== 2026 Asian Games Women's Qualifier ====
23 April 2026 Pool B	Singapore	2–1	Sri Lanka	Jakarta, Indonesia
20:00	S. Ng 16'; Sim 59'	Report	Kaluarachchi 18'	Stadium: GBK Hockey Field

24 April 2026 Pool B	Kazakhstan	1–2	Singapore	Jakarta, Indonesia
17:30	Lobanova 17'	Report	Ong 17'; Tay 22'	Stadium: GBK Hockey Field

26 April 2026 Pool B	Singapore	0–2	Indonesia	Jakarta, Indonesia
15:00		Report	Destian 38'; Maulani 40'	Stadium: GBK Hockey Field

28 April 2026 SF	Bangladesh	3–1	Singapore	Jakarta, Indonesia
17:30	Riya 8', 57', 58'	Report	Cheryll 12'	Stadium: GBK Hockey Field

29 April 2026 Bronze medal match	Singapore	2–2 (1–3 p)	Indonesia	Jakarta, Indonesia
17:30	Sim 47'; I. Chan 52'	Report	Lispa 32'; Prasasti 48'	Stadium: GBK Hockey Field
	Penalties
	J. Ng (penalty shoot-out missed); Ho (penalty shoot-out missed); Ong (penalty shoot-out scored); Chia (penalty shoot-out missed)		(penalty shoot-out missed) Lispa; (penalty shoot-out scored) Indira; (penalty shoot-out scored) Rahayu; (penalty shoot-out scored) Prasasti

==== 2026 Asian Games ====
18 September 2026 Pool B	Thailand	2–0	Singapore	Kakamigahara, Japan
15:00	Komolwit 50'; Inpa 57'	Report		Stadium: Gifu Prefectural Green Stadium

21 September 2026 Pool B	Japan	5–0	Singapore	Kakamigahara, Japan
17:00	Murayama 23'; Toriyama 28'; Kobayakawa 29'; Hasegawa 38'; Saito 44'	Report		Stadium: Gifu Prefectural Green Stadium

23 September 2026 Pool B	Singapore	1–3	Indonesia	Kakamigahara, Japan
11:00	S. Ng 35'	Report	Lispa 26'; Maulani 29'; Naiborhu 54'	Stadium: Gifu Prefectural Green Stadium

25 September 2026 Pool B	Singapore	3–1	Uzbekistan	Kakamigahara, Japan
17:00	Sim 39'; Chia 47'; J. Ng 48'	Report	Yubko 37'	Stadium: Gifu Prefectural Green Stadium

27 September 2026 Pool B	India	7–0	Singapore	Kakamigahara, Japan
19:00	Tete 17'; Toppo 22', 24'; Lalremsiami 26'; Pisal 29'; Pradhan 35'; Deepika 55'	Report		Stadium: Gifu Prefectural Green Stadium

2 October 2026 9th place match	Bangladesh	1–1 (2–1 p)	Singapore	Kakamigahara, Japan
09:00	Riya 10'	Report	Toh 44'	Stadium: Gifu Prefectural Green Stadium
	Penalties
	Khatun (penalty shoot-out missed); Riya (penalty shoot-out missed); Ratry (penalty shoot-out scored); Ema (penalty shoot-out scored)		(penalty shoot-out missed) S. Ng; (penalty shoot-out missed) Ho; (penalty shoot-out scored) S. Ng; (penalty shoot-out missed) Sim; (penalty shoot-out missed) Chia

== See also ==
- Singapore men's national field hockey team
