= Park Seung-ae =

South Korean field hockey player

Personal information
- Born: 31 December 1999 (age 26) South Korea

Sport
- Sport: Field hockey
- Position: Midfield
- Club: KT Sports
National team
| Years | Team | Caps | Goals |
| 2022– | South Korea | 20 | (3) |
Medal record
Women's field hockey
Representing South Korea
Asian Games
| Silver medal – second place | 2022 Hangzhou | Team |

Park Seung-ae (박승애, born 31 December 1999) is a field hockey player from South Korea.

== Personal life ==
Park Seung-ae is an alumnus of Inje University.

== Career ==
=== Senior national team ===
Park made her senior international debut in 2022 at the FIH Nations Cup in Valencia.

In 2023 Park won her first major medal with the national team, taking home gold at the Asian Games in Hangzhou.

She has been named in the squad for the 2024 FIH Olympic Qualifiers in Valencia.
