= Field hockey in India =

- Country: India
- Governing body: Hockey India
- National teams: Senior; India men; India women; India hockey5s men; India hockey5s women; Junior; India men U21; India women U21; India boys U18; India girls U18; India hockey5s boys U18; India hockey5s girls U18
- Nicknames: Men in Blue; Women in Blue

National competitions
- Senior National Hockey Championship (1928–present)

Club competitions
- Hockey India League (2013–present); World Series Hockey (2012); Premier Hockey League (2005–2008)

International competitions
- Senior Teams; Olympic Games M: (gold) (1928, 1932, 1936, 1948, 1952, 1956, 1964, 1980) W: 4th (1980, 2020); World Cup M: (1975) W: 4th (1974); Pro League M: (bronze) (2021–22) W: (bronze) (2021–22); Commonwealth Games M: (silver) (2014, 2010, 2022) W: (gold) (2002); Asian Games M: (gold) (1966, 1998, 2014, 2022, 2026) W: (gold) (1982, 2026); Asia Cup M: (2003, 2007, 2017, 2025) W: (2004, 2017); Asian Champions Trophy M: (2011, 2016, 2018, 2023, 2024, 2026) W: (2016, 2023, 2024); South Asian Games M: (gold) (1995) W: (gold) (2016); World League M: (bronze) (2014–15, 2016–17); Hockey Series M: (gold) (2018–19) F: (gold) (2018–19); Champions Trophy M: (silver) (2016, 2018); Hockey Champions Challenge I M: (gold) (2001) F: (bronze) (2002); Sultan Azlan Shah Cup M: (1985, 1991, 1995, 2009, 2010); Afro-Asian Games M: (gold) (2003) W: (gold) (2003); Western Asiatic Games M: (gold) (1934); Nations Cup F: (2022, 2025-26); Junior Teams; Youth Olympic Games M: (silver) (2018) W: (silver) (2018); World Cup M: (2001, 2016) W: (bronze) (2013); Asia Cup M: (2004, 2008, 2015, 2023, 2024, 2026) W: (2023, 2024, 2026); Sultan of Johor Cup M: (2013, 2014, 2022)

Field hockey in India is played by the men's national team and the women's national team at the international level. Historically, both the teams are amongst the most successful Indian sports teams.

In July 2018, Indian state Odisha wrote a letter to Prime Minister Narendra Modi urging him to declare field hockey as the national sport of India. The state government of Odisha has been supporting India's national field hockey team from February 2018 till next five years. The 2018 Men's Hockey World Cup was held in the Odisha capital Bhubaneswar between 28 November and 16 December and culminated with Belgium as World Champions defeating Netherlands in the finals. Field hockey was believed to be India's national sport but this was debunked by the Ministry of Youth Affairs and Sports, which confirmed that it had not declared any sport or game as the national sport.

== History ==
=== Men's Field Hockey ===
==== Golden years (1928–1959) ====
India participated at the Olympics for the first time in 1928. In the group stage, India beat Austria 6–0, Belgium 9–0 and Switzerland 5–0 without conceding a single goal. They defeated Netherlands 3–0 in the finals under the captaincy of Jaipal Singh Munda. India then went on to successfully defend their title at the 1932 Olympics with a 11–1 win over Japan and 24–1 win over United States, in that match Dhyan Chand scored 8 goals and Roop Singh scored 10 goals, This is still the largest margin of victory ever in the Olympic games even after all these years. India went on to win their third straight title at the 1936 Olympics, this time captained by legendary player Dhyan Chand himself. India stormed through the group stage by winning against Japan 9–0, Hungary 4–0 and United States 7–0. In the semi-finals they defeated France 10–0. The team went on to face Germany in the final. The match was won by India 8–1 and it still remains the biggest winning margin in an Olympic final. The Indian hockey team that won three successive Olympic titles is often regarded as one of the greatest ever to play the sport.

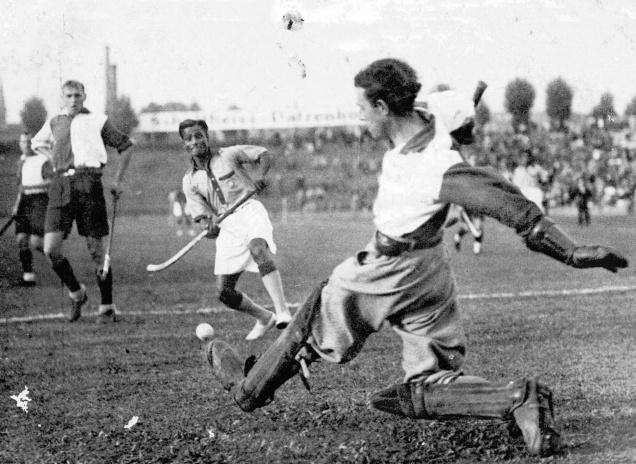
India vs Berlin XI in 1936.

The World War II caused the cancellation of 1940 and 1944 Olympics, which ended the era of a team that dominated world hockey. At the 1948 Olympics India was placed in group A and won all the three games, an 8–0 win over Austria, Argentina 9–1 and Spain 2–0. In the final India went on to face Great Britain, it was the first time India faced them. The skilled British team had already won the gold medal in 1908 and 1920, so this match was billed as a "Battle of Champions" and eventually India won the match 4–0. The result was a sweet one for India, which gained independence from Britain just a year before. This win is often regarded as the greatest ever moment of Indian field hockey and also all of Indian sports.

India went on to win two further gold medals in 1952 and 1956, preserving its record as the most successful and dominant team at that time in the Olympics. In 1952 Olympics quarter-finals India won against Austria 4–0, Great Britain 3–1 in semi-final and defeated Netherlands 6–1 in the final. The match is famous for the five-goal magical performance of Balbir Singh Sr., which is an Olympic record that still stands today. At the 1956 Olympics India defeated Afghanistan 14–0, United States 16–0 and Singapore 6–0 in group stage. India defeated Germany 1–0 in semi-final. In the final India faced Pakistan and won the match 1–0, which was the beginning of the biggest rivalry in field hockey. India and Pakistan again met each other in 1958 Asian Games and this time the match ended in a 0–0 draw. India also defeated Japan 8–0, South Korea 2–1 and Malaysia 6–0. But Pakistan claimed gold medal in the Asian Games by better average. It was the first time India finished runners-up in an international competition.

==== Last years of dominance (1960–1980) ====
At the 1960 Olympics India started its campaign by winning against Denmark 10–0, and Netherlands 4–1, New Zealand 3–0. India defeated Australia and Great Britain in quarter-finals and semi-finals respectively. In the final it was the beginning of a new era, for the first time India lost a match at the Olympics, a 0–1 loss to Pakistan in the final which ended India's streak of six successive gold medals and 30 matches unbeaten run. Two years later India went on to win another silver medal at the 1962 Asian Games. India returned strongly at the 1964 Tokyo Olympics by registering wins against Hong Kong, Belgium, Netherlands, Malaysia and Canada and drawing with Spain and Germany. In the Semi-finals India defeated Australia 3–1, and they won against Pakistan in the final to take their seventh gold medal at the games and also went on to capture their first gold medal in 1966 Asian Games by defeating Pakistan again in the final.

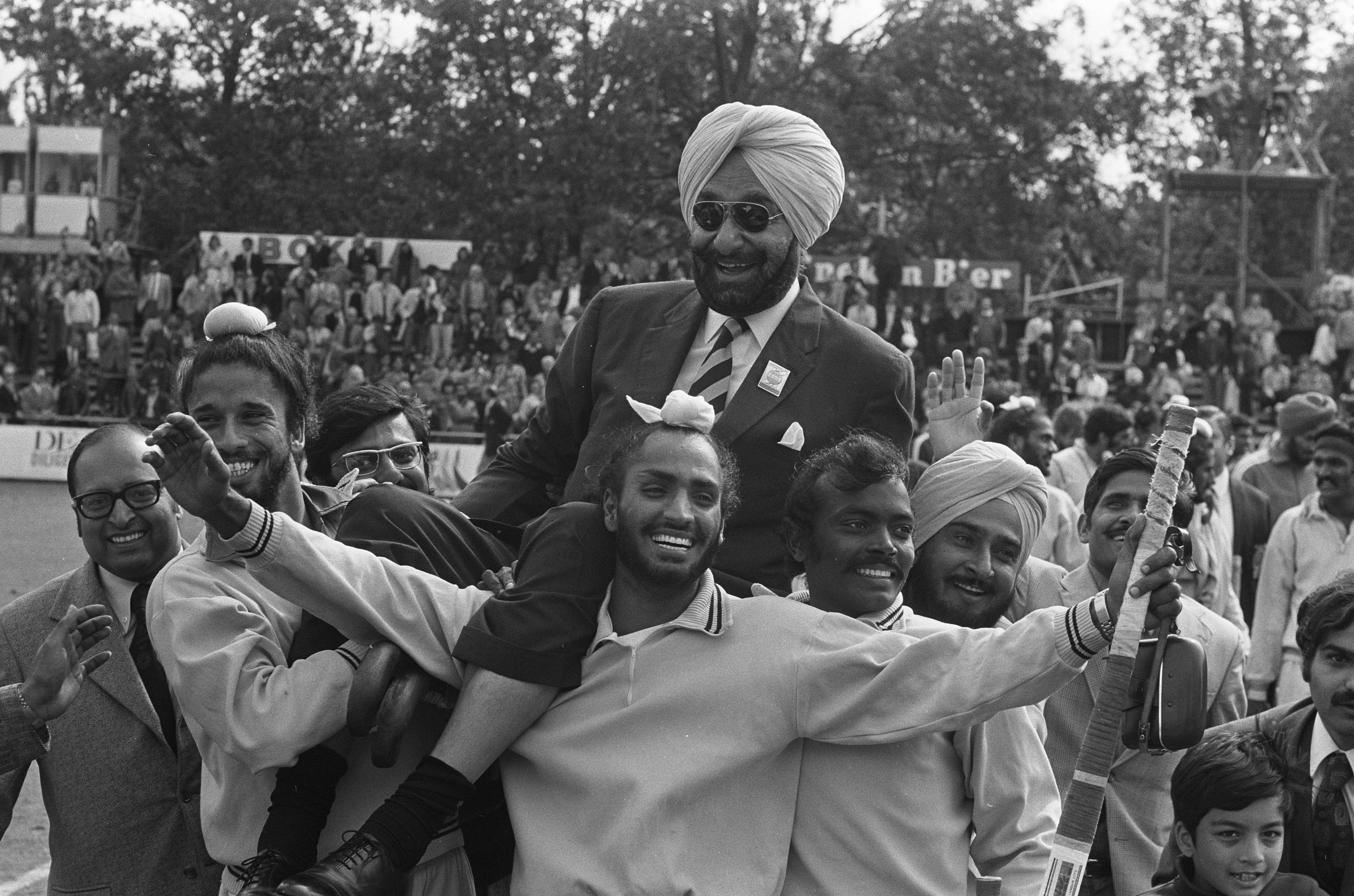
Indian team celebrating their 1–0 win over Pakistan in the 1973 World Cup semi-finals.

At the 1968 Mexico Olympics, India started with a loss against New Zealand but won all of their remaining 6 matches against West Germany, Japan, Spain, Mexico, East Germany and Belgium but India went to a new low, for the first time as they were defeated in the semi-final by Australia, but they successfully claimed the bronze medal by beating West Germany. At the 1972 Olympics also the results were same as India started brightly by defeating Great Britain, Australia, Kenya, New Zealand and Mexico but drew with Netherlands and Poland. They were defeated in the semi-finals by Pakistan. In the third-place match India defeated the Netherlands to claim bronze medal.

India won the bronze medal at the 1971 World Cup by virtue of a win over Kenya in the third-place playoffs. At the 1973 World Cup India defeated Pakistan in semi-finals, but lost to Netherlands in the final in penalty shoot-out after the match ended in a 2–2 draw. But at the 1975 World Cup India defeated Malaysia in the semi-final before beating arch-rivals Pakistan in the final to claim their first title. In the 1976 Olympics astro-turf hockey pitch was introduced, India struggled to maintain their dominance like they did on grass fields and for the first time ever returned home empty handed. The 1980 Olympics was held in Moscow, India started their campaign with an 18–0 win over Tanzania followed by a 2–2 draw with both Poland and Spain respectively. Later followed by resounding wins over Cuba with a margin of 13–0 and Soviet Union by the scoreline of 4–2. India later won the gold medal for a record eighth time by defeating Spain in the final by the score of 4–3.

==== Decline (1981–1997) ====
After the 1980 Olympics success India's performance declined and the following decades resulted in a lot of ups and downs for the national team. As the team failed to win any medal in the World Cups or Olympics, but continued to be a top team in Asia and went on to win several medals in continental competitions. The 1982 World Cup was hosted by India and they finished at 5th position. The team lost to Pakistan in both 1982 Asian Games final and the inaugural Asia Cup final held in Karachi. India ended the decade by winning bronze medals at the 1986 Asian Games and 1982 Champions Trophy and silver medals at the 1985 Asia Cup and 1989 Asia Cup. Their only gold medal success in a big tournament in the decade came at the 1985 Sultan Azlan Shah Cup. India also went on to win 1991 Sultan Azlan Shah Cup and reached finals of 1994 Asia Cup but lost to South Korea in the final. The team then went on to win the 1995 Sultan Azlan Shah Cup.

==== Resurgence (1998–2012) ====
India won their first continental title after 32 years at the 1998 Asian Games by defeating South Korea. The team finished fourth at the 1998 Commonwealth Games. They ended the decade by collecting bronze medal at the 1999 Asia Cup.

India started the new millennium by winning the inaugural Hockey Champions Challenge by defeating South Africa in the final. In 2003 India won their first ever Asia Cup title by defeating Pakistan in the final. The same year India also clinched the first and only Afro-Asian Games title by defeating Pakistan again in the final. For the First time in their history the team did not win a medal at the Asian Games as they finished fifth at the 2006 Asian Games, but India defended their title successfully in the Asia Cup by winning the 2007 Asia Cup. In the final the team conveniently beat South Korea 7–2. India failed to qualify for 2008 Beijing Games for the first time.

The next Asia Cup tournament in 2009 proved to be disastrous as the team finished fifth and failed to get any medal. But the team regained momentum after winning the 2009 Sultan Azlan Shah Cup and also became the joint winners in the 2010 edition. In the 2010 World Cup, which was hosted in India, and the team finished on 8th position. In the 2010 Commonwealth Games which was again hosted by India, the national team reached the final where they were defeated 0–8 by Australia, the biggest defeat India ever suffered. India became the first ever champions of the Asian Champions Trophy after they beat Pakistan in the final of the 2011 edition. In 2012 the team finished last at the Olympics as they lost all their matches, it was disappointing given the fact that they are the most successful team ever at the Olympics. India also finished as runners-up at the 2012 Asian Champions Trophy.

==== 2013–present (Olympic comeback) ====
After the disappointment in Olympics India played at the 2013 Asian Champions Trophy but could only finish at 5th place. The 2014 Asian Games became the turning point as the team defeated Pakistan to win their third gold medal. In 2014–15 Hockey World League India won the bronze medal by beating Netherlands. The team reached the finals of 2016 Men's Hockey Champions Trophy but lost to Australia in penalty shootout. But bounced back by winning Asian Champions Trophy in 2016 Asian Champions Trophy by defeating Pakistan and 2017 Asia Cup by defeating Malaysia. The team also won bronze medal at the 2016–17 Hockey World League by defeating Germany 2–1.

The 2018 Asian Games proved little disappointing as India was the defending champions as well as the favorites to win but was surprised by Malaysia in semi-final. They later won bronze medal by defeating Pakistan 2–1. The team returned strongly by winning 2018 Asian Champions Trophy and collecting a gold medal at the 2018–19 Men's Hockey Series. India played as hosts in the 2018 Hockey World Cup and reached the quarter-finals but lost to Netherlands.

Indian team won bronze in 2020 Tokyo Olympics after defeating Germany 5–4. This was a historic win as the Indian Hockey team won a medal in Olympics after a gap of 41 years. In 2023 India made a successful run at the Asian Champions Trophy and the Asian Games both of which India won undefeated.

=== Women's Field Hockey ===
The team's breakthrough performance came at the Women's Hockey World Cup at Mandelieu in 1974, where it finished in 4th place. Their best performance in the Olympic Games was at 1980 Moscow Summer Olympics (where they came in 4th), when a women's event was held for the first time in Olympic history. The team also won the Gold medal at the inaugural 1982 Asian Games held in New Delhi, defeating Korea in the finals. Captain Suraj Lata Devi led the team to the Gold for three consecutive years at different events- during the 2002 Commonwealth Games, the 2003 Afro-Asian Games, and the 2004 Women's Hockey Asia Cup. Team members were referred to as the "assi (Jasjeet) jaisi koi nahi" or the "Golden Girls of Hockey," after the 2004 win. The team earned a 3rd-place finish at the 2013 Women's Hockey Asia Cup at Kuala Lumpur defeating China in a shootout. At the 2014 Commonwealth Games, it finished in 5th place but at 2014 Asian Games, Incheon stunned Japan 2–1 in a tight match to clinch their third bronze medal at the Asian Games. During the summer of 2015, the team hosted the Round 2 of the 2014–15 Women's FIH Hockey World League and finished on top to qualify for the next stage. At the World League Semi-finals held in Antwerp the team finished in the fifth place beating higher ranked Japan in classification match. The Indian woman's national field hockey team qualified for the 2016 Summer Olympics for the first time since the 1980 Summer Olympics. They were eliminated in the group stage, however, where they placed 6th.

==== 2002 Commonwealth Games and Chak De! India (2007) ====
The 2002 Commonwealth Games Squad, led by Captain Suraj Lata Devi, competed in the 2002 Commonwealth Games. The team entered the finals after defeating the New Zealand women's national field hockey team. and placed first, winning the Gold after they beat the English women's hockey team.

This event served as the inspiration for the 2007 Bollywood film about women's field hockey, Chak De! India starring Shah Rukh Khan (after screenwriter Jaideep Sahni read a short article about it). Sahni began to model the character of Kabir Khan on hockey coach Maharaj Krishan Kaushik. After hearing the storyline, Kaushik suggested that Sahni meet hockey player Mir Ranjan Negi (who faced accusations of throwing the match against Pakistan during the 1982 Asian Games). Sahni has stated that he was unaware of Negi's tribulations while writing the script and that the resemblance with Negi's life was entirely coincidental. Negi affirmed this point stating that he didn't "want to hog the limelight. This movie is not a documentary of Mir Ranjan Negi's life. It is in fact the story of a team that becomes a winning lot from a bunch of hopeless girls". In response to the fact that the media equated Kabir Khan with Negi, Sahni said that "Our script was written a year and a half back. It is very unfortunate that something, which is about women athletes, has just started becoming about Negi."

==== Tokyo Olympics and resurgence ====
India at the 2020 Summer Olympics for the first time ever, reached the semi-final in the Women's Hockey Olympic event but failed to bag any medal after they lost to Argentina in the semi-final and then to Great Britain in the bronze medal match. Following their performance at the Olympics, the team went on to win bronze medals at the 2022 Asia Cup and the Commonwealth Games and a third-place finish in the 2021–22 Pro League. In 2022 India won the first ever FIH Women's Nations Cup. However, they failed to qualify for the Paris Olympics losing to Japan in the bronze medal match at the Olympic Qualifier in Ranchi on 19 January 2024.

== Administration ==
=== Indian Hockey Federation (1925-2008) ===
The Indian Hockey Federation was the administrative body of field hockey in India. Incorporated in 1925, it was under the global jurisdiction of the International Hockey Federation.

The IHF was formed on 7 November 1925 in Gwalior. India was the first non-European team to be a part of the FIH. As a member of the International Hockey Federation, it represented India in all international matches under the former leadership of KPS Gill & the secretary of the federation, K. Jyothikumaran. The women's team was directed by the Indian Women's Hockey Federation.

Prem Nath Sahni, an Indian Administrative Service officer with interest in hockey since his college days, took over stewardship of the Indian Hockey Federation in 1973, at a time when conflicts broke out between its Northern and Southern wings. The Indian Hockey scene was marked by excellence until 1973 when Ashwani Kumar, the then president, stepped down. India lost its supremacy in the game on the world stage ever since. P N Sahni remained the President of the Haryana Olympic Association from 1969 to 1978

=== New committee (IOA) (2008) ===
The Indian Olympic Association appointed a new five-member national selection committee. This panel will work in conjunction with the International Hockey Federation in managing field hockey in India. The panel was headed by Aslam Sher Khan, a former MP and former hockey captain and includes Ashok Kumar, Ajit Pal Singh, Zafar Iqbal and Dhanraj Pillay. Aslam Sher Khan has now been replaced by Ajit Pal Singh as the chairman of the national selection committee. Aslam Sher Khan was highly displeased by this decision, though he remained as a selector.

On 30 April 2008, in an interview with India Today, Khan indicated the impact of the 2007 film about the National Women's Hockey Team, Chak De! India, on his future strategy by stating that he wants "to create a 'Chak De' effect" within Indian hockey.

=== Hockey India (2009-present) ===
Hockey India plans, directs and conducts all the activities for both men's and women's field hockey in India. It is recognized by the Ministry of Youth Affairs and Sports, Government of India as the sole body responsible towards promoting the sport. It was formed after the Indian Hockey Federation was dismissed in 2008.

Hockey India was established on 20 May 2009 and is affiliated to the International Hockey Federation (FIH), the Indian Olympic Association (IOA) and the Asian Hockey Federation (AHF).

Hockey India, with the assistance of the Sports Authority of India and Department of Sports, trains players at sub-junior, junior and senior level. The governing body is responsible for training the coaches, as well as educating and equipping technical officials and umpires.

Hockey India launched its own logo in a ceremony on 24 July 2008. It resembles Ashok Chakra of Indian flag. It is made up of hockey sticks.

Hockey India manages four squads that represent India in international field hockey: the India men's national field hockey team, the India women's national field hockey team, the India men's national under-21 field hockey team, and the India women's national under-21 field hockey team.

== National teams ==
National teams of India
India (Men's)	India (Women's)	U-21 (Men's)
U-21 (Women's)	U-18 (Men's)	U-18 (Women's)
Hockey5s (Men's)	Hockey5s (Women's)	U-18 Hockey5s (Men's)
- U-18 Hockey5s (Women's)

The India men's national field hockey team is governed by the Hockey India (HI) and is a member of the Asian Hockey Federation (AHF). Since 1926, the BCCI has been affiliated with FIH, the international governing body for world field hockey. In 2011, the Hockey India became the members of the both FIH and AHF.

=== Performance ===
The following list includes the performance of all of India's national teams at major competitions.

==== Men's senior team ====
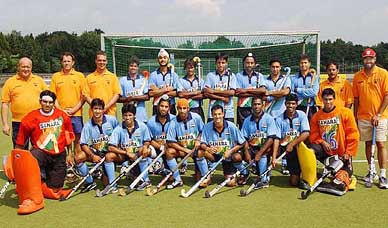
Indian Hockey team

The Indian Hockey Team is the national men's hockey team of India. It was the first non-European team to be a part of the International Hockey Federation. In 1928, the team won its first Olympic gold medal. From 1928 to 1956, was the golden period for the Indian Hockey team. The Indian men's team remained unbeaten in the Olympics, gaining six gold medals in a row. The Indian team has won a total of eight gold, one silver and three bronze medals in Olympics.

FIH World Rankings as of 6 November 2026.
Rank	Change	Team	Points
6	Steady	Spain	3473.06
7	Steady	England	3431.57
8	Steady	India	3173.13
9	Steady	New Zealand	2965.89
10	Steady	France	2841.88

Tournament	Appearance in finals	Last appearance	Best performance
Olympics	9 out of 22	2024	Champions (1928, 1932, 1936, 1948, 1952, 1956, 1964, 1980)
Men's FIH Hockey World Cup	2 out of 15	2023	Champions (1975)
Men's FIH Pro League	0 out of 6	2025-26	3rd Place (2021-22)
Asian Games	14 out of 18	2026	Champions (1966, 1998, 2014, 2022, 2026)
Men's Hockey Asia Cup	9 out of 12	2025	Champions (2003, 2007, 2017, 2025)
Men's Asian Champions Trophy	7 out of 9	2026	Champions (2011, 2016, 2018, 2023, 2024, 2026)
Commonwealth Games	3 out of 6	2022	Runners-up (2014, 2010, 2022)
Men's FIH Hockey World League	0 out of 3	2016-17	3rd Place (2014-15, 2016–17)
Hockey Champions Trophy	2 out of 16	2018	Runners-up (2016, 2018)
Men's Hockey Champions Challenge I	2 out of 4	2011	Champions (2001)
Hockey Series	1 out of 1	2018-19	Champions (2018-19)
Afro-Asian Games	1 out of 1	2003	Champions (2003)
Western Asiatic Games	1 out of 1	1934	Champions (1934)
Sultan Azlan Shah Cup	9 out of 23	2025	Champions (1985, 1991, 1995, 2009, 2010)
South Asian Games	4 out of 4	2016	Champions (1995)

==== Women's senior team ====
The Indian Women's Hockey Team (nicknamed the Nabhvarna) is the national women's team representing hockey in India. It is the national women's team that represents India in international field hockey competitions. The team is currently coached by Netherlands' Sjoerd Marijne and led by Salima Tete and is currently ranked 7th in the FIH World Rankings. Captain Suraj Lata Devi led the team to the Gold for three consecutive years: during the 2002 Commonwealth Games (the event which inspired the 2007 Shah Rukh Khan film, Chak De India), the 2003 Afro-Asian Games, and the 2004 Asia Cup. They were referred to as the Jassi (Jasjeet) jaisi koi nahi or Golden girls of hockey, after winning the 2004 Asia Cup.

FIH Women's World Rankings as of 3 October 2026.
Rank	Change	Team	Points
5	Steady	Spain	3089.9
6	Steady	Germany	3063.32
7	▲1	India	3053.45
8	▼1	England	3044.18
9	Steady	Australia	2812.79

Tournament	Appearance in finals	Last appearance	Best performance
Olympics	0 out of 3	2020	4th place (1980, 2020)
Women's FIH Hockey World Cup	0 out of 8	2022	4th place (1974)
Women's FIH Pro League	0 out of 2	2023-24	3rd Place (2021-22)
Asian Games	4 out of 12	2026	Champions (1982, 2026)
Women's Hockey Asia Cup	5 out of 10	2025	Champions (2004, 2017)
Women's Asian Champions Trophy	5 out of 7	2024	Champions (2016, 2023, 2024)
Commonwealth Games	2 out of 7	2022	Champions (2002)
Women's FIH Hockey World League	0 out of 3	2016-17	10th place (2014-15)
Women's Hockey Champions Challenge I	0 out of 4	2014	3rd place (2002)
Hockey Series	1 out of 1	2018-19	Champions (2018-19)
Afro-Asian Games	1 out of 1	2003	Champions (2003)
South Asian Games	1 out of 1	2016	Champions (2016)
Women's FIH Hockey Nations Cup	2 out of 2	2025–26	Champions (2022, 2025–26)

==== Men's U-21 team ====
Tournament	Appearance in finals	Last appearance	Best performance
Men's FIH Hockey Junior World Cup	3 out of 12	2025	Champions (2001, 2016)
Men's Hockey Junior Asia Cup	8 out of 11	2026	Champions (2004, 2008, 2015, 2023, 2024, 2026)
Sultan of Johor Cup	8 out of 12	2025	Champions (2013, 2014, 2022)

==== Women's U-21 team ====
Tournament	Appearance in finals	Last appearance	Best performance
Women's FIH Hockey Junior World Cup	0 out of 7	2025	3rd place (2013)
Women's Hockey Junior Asia Cup	4 out of 9	2026	Champions (2023, 2024, 2026)

==== Men's U-18 team ====
Tournament	Appearance in finals	Last appearance	Best performance
U18 Asia Cup	3 out of 4	2026	Champions (2001, 2016, 2026)

==== Men's U-18 Hockey5s team ====
Tournament	Appearance in finals	Last appearance	Best performance
Youth Olympics	1 out of 1	2018	Runners-up (2018)
U18 Asia Cup	1 out of 1	2026	Champions (2026)

==== Women's U-18 team ====
Tournament	Appearance in finals	Last appearance	Best performance
U18 Asia Cup	1 out of 5	2026	Champions (2000)

==== Women's U-18 Hockey5s team ====
Tournament	Appearance in finals	Last appearance	Best performance
Youth Olympics	1 out of 1	2018	Runners-up (2018)
U18 Asia Cup	1 out of 1	2026	Runners-up (2026)

==== Men's Hockey5's team ====
Tournament	Appearance in finals	Last appearance	Best performance
World Cup	0 out of 1	2024	5th (2024)
Men's Hockey5s Asia Cup	1 out of 1	2023	Champions (2023)
Men's FIH Hockey5s	1 out of 1	2022	Champions (2022)

==== Women's Hockey5's team ====
Tournament	Appearance in finals	Last appearance	Best performance
World Cup	1 out of 1	2024	Runners-up (2024)
Women's Hockey5s Asia Cup	1 out of 1	2023	Champions (2023)
Women's FIH Hockey5s	0 out of 1	2022	4th (2022)

== Association history ==
No.	Association	State/UT	President
1	Manipur Hockey	Manipur	Khoirom loyalakpa
2	Hockey Andaman and Nicobar	Andaman and Nicobar Islands	Alphonse Baa
3	Hockey Andhra Pradesh	Andhra Pradesh	B M Chanakya Raju
4	Hockey Arunachal	Arunachal Pradesh	Gumjum Haider
5	Assam Hockey	Assam	Tapan Kumar Das
6	Hockey Bihar	Bihar	Sharwon Kumar
7	Hockey Chandigarh	Chandigarh	Karan Gilhotra
8	Hockey Chhattisgarh	Chhattisgarh	Firoz Ansari
9	Dadra & Nagar and Haveli & Daman & Diu Hockey	Dadra & Nagar Haveli and Daman & Diu	Nilpa Bhavesh Manani
10	Hockey Association of Odisha	Odisha	Dr. Dilip Tirkey
11	Delhi Hockey	Delhi	Hitesh Sindwani
12	Goans Hockey	Goa	Costau Xavier Marquis
13	Hockey Gujarat	Gujarat	R.V Shelar
14	Hockey Haryana	Haryana	Jaideep Malik
15	Hockey Himachal	Himachal Pradesh	Sukh Ram Choudhary
16	Hockey Bengal	West Bengal	Swapan Banerjee
17	Hockey Jammu and Kashmir	Jammu and Kashmir	Gurdeep Singh Sangral
18	Hockey Jharkhand	Jharkhand	Bhola Nath Singh
19	Hockey Karnataka	Karnataka	S.VS Subramanya Gupta
20	Hockey Kerala	Kerala	V. Sunilkumar
21	Hockey Madhya Pradesh	Madhya Pradesh	Nitin Dhimole
22	Hockey Mizoram	Mizoram	K. Lalthlengliana
23	Hockey Nagaland	Nagaland	ADHOC Committee
24	Le Puducherry Hockey	Puducherry	Dr. E. Kumaressan
25	Hockey Punjab	Punjab	Nitin Kohli
26	Hockey Rajasthan	Rajasthan	Arun Kumar Saraswat
27	Hockey Unit of Tamil Nadu	Tamil Nadu	Sekar J Manoharan
28	Hockey Telangana	Telangana	Konda Vijay Kumar
29	Tripura Hockey	Tripura	Sudip Roy Barman
30	Uttar Pradesh Hockey	Uttar Pradesh	Rakesh Katyal
31	Hockey Uttarakhand	Uttarakhand	Raghu Bir Singh Rawat
32	Hockey Maharashtra	Maharashtra	Krishna Prakash

== Organisation structure ==
=== International Field Hockey ===
International field hockey in India generally does not follow a fixed pattern. Field Hockey in India is managed by the Hockey India (HI).

==== Men's National Team ====
The India men's national field hockey team represents India in international field hockey competitions, and is governed by Hockey India. The team was formerly under the control of Indian Hockey Federation. India was the first non-European team to be a part of the International Hockey Federation. India's hockey team is the most successful team ever in the Olympics, having won a total of eight gold medals – in 1928, 1932, 1936, 1948, 1952, 1956, 1964 and 1980.

In 1928, the team won its first Olympic gold medal and until 1960, the Indian men's team remained unbeaten in the Olympics, winning six gold medals in a row. The team had a 30–0 winning streak during this time, from their first game in 1928 until the 1960 gold medal final which they lost. India also won the World Cup in 1975. India also has the best overall performance in Olympic history with 87 victories out of the 142 matches played. They have also scored more goals in the Olympics than any other team. They are also the only team ever to win the Olympics without conceding a single goal, having done so in 1928 and 1956.

==== Women's National Team ====
The Indian women's national field hockey team represents India in international field hockey, and is governed by Hockey India. Nabhvarna are currently ranked 9th in the FIH World Rankings, and are ranked as the second best team in Asia. They have won the gold medals at the 2002 Commonwealth Games, 1982 Asian Games and 2026 Asian Games. They have also won the Women's Asia Cup twice, i.e. in 2004 and 2017. They also won the Asian Champions Trophy 2016, 2023 and 2024.

=== Domestic Field Hockey ===
==== National Championships ====
These National Championships are divided into two divisions, to ensure that participating teams are competing in a fair, equal environment, and against teams with similar level of skills.

Below is the list of National Championships that Hockey India conducts every season:

- Hockey India Senior Men National Championship
- Hockey India Senior Women National Championship
- Hockey India Junior Men National Championship
- Hockey India Junior Women National Championship
- Hockey India Sub-Junior Men National Championship
- Hockey India Sub-Junior Women National Championship
- Hockey India 5-a-side National Championship (Women)
- Hockey India 5-a-side National Championship (Men)
- Hockey India 5-a-side National Championship (Mixed)

==== Leagues ====
- Hockey India League

==== Hockey Tournaments ====
- Beighton Cup
- Senior Nehru Hockey Tournament
- Surjit Memorial Hockey Tournament
- All India MCC Murugappa Gold Cup Hockey Tournament
- All India Obaidullah Khan Gold Cup Hockey Tournament
- Lal Bahadur Shastri Hockey Tournament
- All India Scindia Gold Cup Hockey Tournament
- All India Swami Shradhanand Hockey Tournament
- All India Guru Teg Bahadur Gold Cup Hockey Tournament
- Mahant Raja Sarwesjwardas Memorial All India Tournament
- All India Guru Gobind Singh Gold Cup Hockey Tournament
- All India Trades Cup Hockey Tournament
- All India Police Hockey Championship
- Aga Khan Hockey Tournament
- All India K.D Singh Babu Memorial Invitation Prize Money Hockey Tournament
- Lychettira Hockey Cup/Kodava Hockey Festival
- Bombay Gold Cup
- Liberals All India Hockey Tournament

== Stadiums ==
Name	City	State	Est.	Capacity	Home team	Notes	Image
Birsa Munda International Hockey Stadium	Rourkela	Odisha	2023	21,800	Odisha Hockey Team	Largest all seated hockey stadium in the world.	
Aishbagh Stadium	Bhopal	Madhya Pradesh	n/a	10,000	Bhopal Badshahs		
Sardar Vallabhbhai Patel International Hockey Stadium	Raipur	Chhattisgarh	2015	4,000			
Anna Stadium	Tiruchirappalli	Tamil Nadu	1970	10,000			
Annasaheb Magar PCMC Stadium	Pimpri	Maharashtra	n/a	5,000			
Bangalore Hockey Stadium	Bangalore	Karnataka	n/a	7,000			
Birsa Munda Hockey Stadium	Ranchi	Jharkhand	n/a	5,000	Ranchi Rays		
CAFVD Sports Stadium	Pune	Maharashtra	n/a	4,000			
Major Dhyanchand Hockey Stadium	Lucknow	Uttar Pradesh	n/a	10,000	Uttar Pradesh Wizards		
Master Chandgiram Sports Stadium	Saifai, Etawah district	Uttar Pradesh	n/a	12,000			
Dr Sampurnanda Stadium	Varanasi	Uttar Pradesh	1964	10,000			
Major Dhyan Chand Stadium	Jhansi	Uttar Pradesh	n/a	n/a		Under construction	
Major Dhyan Chand National Stadium	New Delhi	Delhi	1933	20,000	Delhi Wave Riders		
Faizabad Sports Complex	Faizabad	Uttar Pradesh	TBA	30,000		Under construction	
Gachibowli Hockey Stadium	Hyderabad	Telangana	n/a	8,000			
Khuman Lampak Hockey Stadium	Imphal	Manipur	1999	8,000			
International Hockey Stadium	Mohali	Punjab	2013	16,000			
International Hockey Stadium	Rajnandgaon	Chhattisgarh	2013	30,000			
International Hockey Stadium	Kollam	Kerala	2014	5,000			
JRD Tata Sports Complex	Jamshedpur	Jharkhand	1991	40,000			
Jaypee Sport City Hockey Stadium	Noida	Uttar Pradesh	TBA	10,000		Under construction	
Kalinga Stadium	Bhubaneswar	Odisha	2010	16,000	Kalinga Lancers		
Biju Patnaik Hockey Stadium	Rourkela	Odisha	2010	25,000			
Mahindra Hockey Stadium	Mumbai	Maharashtra	n/a	8,500			
Maulana Md. Tayabullah Hockey Stadium	Guwahati	Assam	2007	2,000			
Mayor Radhakrishnan Hockey Stadium	Chennai	Tamil Nadu	n/a	8,670	Chennai Cheetahs		
Patliputra Sports Complex	Patna	Bihar	2011	20,000			
PCMC Hockey Stadium	Pimpri	Maharashtra	1993	5,000	Pune Strykers		
B.R. Yadav International Hockey Stadium	Bilaspur	Chhattisgarh	2019	n/a			
Shaheed Bhagat Singh Stadium	Ferozpur	Punjab	1926	10,000			
Shilaroo Hockey Stadium	Shilaroo	Himachal Pradesh	2010	n/a			
Shivaji Hockey Stadium	New Delhi	NCR	1964	7,000			
Shree Shiv Chhatrapati Sports Complex	Pune	Maharashtra	1992	11,900			
Chandigarh Hockey Stadium	Chandigarh	Chandigarh	1988	30,000	Chandigarh Comets		
Surjit Hockey Stadium	Jalandhar	Punjab	2009	7,000	Punjab Warriors		
Vidarbha Hockey Association Stadium	Nagpur	Maharashtra	n/a	5,000			
Madurai International Hockey Stadium	Madurai	Tamil Nadu	2025	2,000			
Nathu Barkheda International Sports Complex	Barkheda Nathu	Madhya Pradesh	2026				

== Hosting history ==
Competition	Edition	Winner	Final	Runners-up	India's position	Venues	Final venue	Stadium
Men's senior competitions
Western Asiatic Games	1934 Western Asiatic Games	India	5 – 0	Afghanistan	Champion	1 (in 1 city)	Major Dhyan Chand National Stadium	
Men's FIH Hockey World Cup	1982 Men's Hockey World Cup	Pakistan	3 – 1	Germany	5th Place	1 (in 1 city)	BHA Stadium	
Asian Games	Field hockey at the 1982 Asian Games	Pakistan	7 – 1	India	Runners-up	1 (in 1 city)	Shivaji Hockey Stadium	
Men's Hockey Asia Cup	1989 Men's Hockey Asia Cup	Pakistan	2 – 0	India	Runners-up	1 (in 1 city)	Shivaji Hockey Stadium	
South Asian Games	Field hockey at the 1995 South Asian Games	India		Pakistan	Champion	1 (in 1 city)	Mayor Radhakrishnan Hockey Stadium	
Hockey Champions Trophy	1996 Men's Hockey Champions Trophy	Netherlands	3 – 2	Pakistan	4th place	1 (in 1 city)	Mayor Radhakrishnan Stadium	
Afro-Asian Games	Field hockey at the 2003 Afro-Asian Games	India	3 - 1	Pakistan	Champion	1 (in 1 city)	G. M. C. Balayogi Athletic Stadium	
Hockey Champions Trophy	2005 Men's Hockey Champions Trophy	Australia	3 – 1	Netherlands	6th place	1 (in 1 city)	Mayor Radhakrishnan Stadium	
Men's Hockey Asia Cup	2007 Men's Hockey Asia Cup	India	7 – 2	South Korea	Champion	1 (in 1 city)	Mayor Radhakrishnan Stadium	
Commonwealth Games	Hockey at the 2010 Commonwealth Games – Men's tournament	Australia	8 – 0	India	Runners-up	1 (in 1 city)	Major Dhyan Chand National Stadium	
Men's FIH Hockey World Cup	2010 Men's Hockey World Cup	Australia	2 – 1	Germany	8th Place	1 (in 1 city)	Major Dhyan Chand National Stadium	
Olympic Qualifier	2012 Olympic Qualifier	India	8 – 1	France	Champion	1 (in 1 city)	Major Dhyan Chand National Stadium	
Men's FIH Hockey World League	2012–13 Men's FIH Hockey World League Final	Netherlands	7–2	New Zealand	6th place	1 (in 1 city)	Major Dhyan Chand National Stadium	
Hockey Champions Trophy	2014 Men's Hockey Champions Trophy	Germany	2 – 0	Pakistan	4th place	1 (in 1 city)	Kalinga Stadium	
Men's FIH Hockey World League	2014–15 Men's FIH Hockey World League Final	Australia	2–1	Belgium	3rd Place	1 (in 1 city)	Sardar Vallabhbhai Patel International Hockey Stadium	
South Asian Games	Field hockey at the 2016 South Asian Games	Pakistan	1 – 0	India	Runners-up	1 (in 1 city)	Maulana Md. Tayabullah Hockey Stadium	
Men's FIH Hockey World League	2016–17 Men's FIH Hockey World League Final	Australia	2–1	Argentina	3rd Place	1 (in 1 city)	Kalinga Stadium	
Men's FIH Hockey World Cup	2018 Men's Hockey World Cup	Belgium	0 – 0 Penalties; 3 – 2	Netherlands	6th Place	1 (in 1 city)	Kalinga Stadium	
FIH Hockey Series	2018–19 Men's FIH Series Finals	India	5 – 1	South Africa	Champion	1 (in 1 city)	Kalinga Stadium	
Men's FIH Pro League	2020–21 Men's FIH Pro League (India leg)					1 (in 1 city)	Kalinga Stadium	
Men's FIH Pro League	2021–22 Men's FIH Pro League (India leg)					1 (in 1 city)	Kalinga Stadium	
Men's FIH Pro League	2022–23 Men's FIH Pro League (India leg)					2 (in 2 cities)	Kalinga Stadium; Birsa Munda International Hockey Stadium	
Men's FIH Hockey World Cup	2023 Men's Hockey World Cup	Germany	3 – 3 Penalties; 5 – 4	Belgium	9th Place	2 (in 2 cities)	Kalinga Stadium; Birsa Munda International Hockey Stadium	
Men's Asian Champions Trophy	2023 Men's Asian Champions Trophy	India	4 – 3	Malaysia	Champion	1 (in 1 city)	Major Dhyan Chand National Stadium	
Men's FIH Pro League	2023–24 Men's FIH Pro League (India leg)					2 (in 2 cities)	Kalinga Stadium; Birsa Munda International Hockey Stadium	
Men's FIH Pro League	2024–25 Men's FIH Pro League (India leg)					1 (in 1 city)	Kalinga Stadium	
Men's FIH Pro League	2025–26 Men's FIH Pro League (India leg)					1 (in 1 city)	Birsa Munda International Hockey Stadium	
Men's Hockey Asia Cup	2025 Men's Hockey Asia Cup	India	4 – 1	South Korea	Champion	1 (in 1 city)	Rajgir Sports Complex Hockey Stadium	
Men's Asian Champions Trophy	2026 Men's Asian Champions Trophy	India	4 – 1	Japan	Champion	2 (in 2 cities)	Surjit Hockey Stadium; Mohali International Hockey Stadium	
Men's youth competitions
Men's Hockey Junior Asia Cup	2008 Men's Hockey Junior Asia Cup	India	3 – 2	South Korea	Champion	1 (in 1 city)	G. M. C. Balayogi Athletic Stadium	
Men's FIH Hockey Junior World Cup	2013 Men's Hockey Junior World Cup	Germany	5 – 2	France	10th Place	1 (in 1 city)	Major Dhyan Chand National Stadium	
Men's FIH Hockey Junior World Cup	2016 Men's Hockey Junior World Cup	India	2 – 1	Belgium	Champion	1 (in 1 city)	Major Dhyan Chand Hockey Stadium, Lucknow	
Men's FIH Hockey Junior World Cup	2021 Men's FIH Hockey Junior World Cup	Argentina	4 – 2	Germany	4th Place	1 (in 1 city)	Kalinga Stadium	
Men's FIH Hockey Junior World Cup	2025 Men's FIH Hockey Junior World Cup	Germany	1 – 1 Penalties; 3 – 2	Spain	3rd Place	2 (in 2 cities)	Mayor Radhakrishnan Hockey Stadium; Madurai International Hockey Stadium	
Women's senior competitions
Asian Games	Field hockey at the 1982 Asian Games	India		South Korea	Champion	1 (in 1 city)	Shivaji Hockey Stadium	
1989 Women's Intercontinental Cup		South Korea	2 – 1	China	8th place	1 (in 1 city)	Shivaji Hockey Stadium	
Women's Hockey Asia Cup	1999 Women's Hockey Asia Cup	South Korea	3 – 2	India	Runners-up	1 (in 1 city)	Major Dhyan Chand National Stadium	
Afro-Asian Games	Field hockey at the 2003 Afro-Asian Games	India	5 - 4	South Africa	Champion	1 (in 1 city)	G. M. C. Balayogi Athletic Stadium	
Women's Asian Champions Trophy	2004 Women's Hockey Asia Cup	India	1 – 0	Japan	Champion	1 (in 1 city)	Jaipal Singh Stadium	
Commonwealth Games	Hockey at the 2010 Commonwealth Games – Women's tournament	Australia	2 – 2 Penalties; 4 – 2	New Zealand	5th place	1 (in 1 city)	Major Dhyan Chand National Stadium	
Olympic Qualifier	2012 Olympic Qualifier	South Africa	3 – 1	India	Runners-up	1 (in 1 city)	Major Dhyan Chand National Stadium	
Women's FIH Hockey World League	2012–13 Women's FIH Hockey World League Round 2				1st	1 (in 1 city)	Major Dhyan Chand National Stadium	
Women's FIH Hockey World League	2014–15 Women's FIH Hockey World League Round 2	India	3 – 1	Poland	Champion	1 (in 1 city)	Major Dhyan Chand National Stadium	
South Asian Games	Field hockey at the 2016 South Asian Games	India	10 – 0	Sri Lanka	Champions	1 (in 1 city)	Maulana Md. Tayabullah Hockey Stadium	
Women's FIH Pro League	2021–22 Women's FIH Pro League (India leg)					1 (in 1 city)	Kalinga Stadium	
Women's Asian Champions Trophy	2023 Women's Asian Champions Trophy	India	4 – 0	Japan	Champion	1 (in 1 city)	Jaipal Singh Stadium	
Women's FIH Pro League	2023–24 Women's FIH Pro League (India leg)					2 (in 2 cities)	Kalinga Stadium; Birsa Munda International Hockey Stadium	
Olympic Qualifier	2024 Olympic Qualifier	Germany	2 – 0	United States	4th	1 (in 1 city)	Jaipal Singh Stadium	
Women's Asian Champions Trophy	2024 Women's Asian Champions Trophy	India	1 – 0	China	Champion	1 (in 1 city)	Rajgir Sports Complex Hockey Stadium	
Women's FIH Pro League	2024–25 Women's FIH Pro League (India leg)					1 (in 1 city)	Kalinga Stadium	
World Cup Qualifiers	2026 World Cup Qualifiers	England	2 – 0	India	Runners-up	1 (in 1 city)	G. M. C. Balayogi Athletic Stadium	
Women's Asian Champions Trophy	2026 Women's Asian Champions Trophy					1 (in 1 city)	Nathu Barkheda International Sports Complex	
Women's youth competitions
Women's Hockey Junior Asia Cup	2004 Women's Hockey Junior Asia Cup	China	3 – 2	South Korea	3rd place	1 (in 1 city)	G. M. C. Balayogi Athletic Stadium	

== Broadcast history ==
=== Domestic competitions ===
==== Domestic franchise Field Hockey ====
List of current broadcasters:

Event	Period	Television Rights		Streaming Rights	
Event	Period	Conglomerate	Network	Conglomerate	Platform
Hockey India League	2025–26	Culver Max Entertainment	Sony Sports Network	Prasar Bharati	WAVES
Hockey India League	2025–26	Prasar Bharati	DD Sports	YouTube	HIL Youtube Channel

=== International competitions ===
List of current broadcasters:

Event	Period	Television Rights		Streaming Rights	
Event	Period	Conglomerate	Network	Conglomerate	Platform
FIH tournaments	2023–2027	Disney Star	Star Sports	Disney Star	JioHotstar
Men's Hockey Asia Cup	2025	Culver Max Entertainment	Sony Sports Network	Culver Max Entertainment	SonyLIV
Women's Hockey Asia Cup	None				
Men's Asian Champions Trophy	2026	Disney Star	Star Sports	Disney Star	JioHotstar
Women's Asian Champions Trophy	2026	Disney Star	Star Sports	Disney Star	JioHotstar

== See also ==
Indian national hockey teams
Men's					Women's				
Senior	Under-21	Under-18	Senior Hockey5s	Under-18 hockey5s	Senior	Under-21	Under-18	Senior Hockey5s	Under-18 hockey5s

- India national para hockey team
- India–Pakistan field hockey rivalry
- India–Malaysia field hockey record
- List of Indian hockey captains in Olympics
- List of National Sports Award recipients in field hockey
- Indian Hockey Federation
- Hockey India
