= Raghu Prasad =

Indian field hockey umpire

Raghu Prasad (born 1978) is an Olympic Games panel field hockey umpire from India. He officiated in three Summer Olympic games, four senior World Cups, two Asian Games and one Commonwealth Games. He was named as the International Hockey Federation's (FIH) Male Umpire of the Year for 2025.

== Early life and background ==
Prasad is from Bengaluru, Karnataka. He started playing hockey in Class 6 but his parents wanted him to become a cricketer. He played for Bharat Electronics Limited Colony Youth Association hockey club and former India star Sandeep Michael was his club mate. His first coach was Prakash VR. He studied engineering. He chose hockey leaving a prospective civil aviation career to focus on umpiring. He started his umpiring career with Karnataka State Hockey Association in 1999 officiating the club and state-level matches. His followed his mentor Kannan Krishnamurthy of KSHA, who is also a former international hockey umpire. In 2001, he passed the Indian Hockey Federation national grade umpiring test at the National Junior (Under-19) hockey championship in Karimnagar, Andhra Pradesh.

== Career ==
By 18 November 2025, he had officiated in 198 international matches and received 33 video umpiring assignments. He began with inter-school and inter-collegiate matches. At 24 years, he made his international debut as an umpire at the Hockey Australia Challenge Cup, a four-nations tournament in Australia in 2003. His first match was a high-profile Pakistan-Australia and he was reportedly nervous for the first few minutes but later, the umpires manager, Don Prior appreciated him and gave him some tips.

On 16 July 2009, he was included in the FIH World Development Panel which led to his officiating in World Cups and Olympic Games.

His first big event was at the 2010 World Cup and he went on to officiate in the 2014, 2018 and 2023 Senior World Cups. He first officiated in the summer 2012 London Olympic Games and in Tokyo 2020 and Paris 2024. He was in the reserves for the Rio 2016 Olympics. He also blew the whistle for two Asian Games in 2018 and 2022 and one Commonwealth Games in 2014.

Hockey India and its president and former international Dilip Tirkey congratulated him on winning the FIH award. He is set to become the first Asian umpire to officiate in 200 international matches at the Sultan Azlan Shah Cup tournament 2025 in Malaysia, according to FIH.

He completed 100 senior caps at Fintro Hockey World League in Antwerp and became the third Indian to do so after Satinder Kumar and Javed Shaikh.

== Awards ==
- 2015: Golden Whistle Award.
- 2025: FIH Male Umpire of the year.
