= Yashdeep Siwach =

Indian field hockey player

Personal information
- Born: 26 December 2000 (age 25) Sonepat, Haryana, India

Sport
- Sport: Field hockey
- Position: Defender
- Club: Railway Sports Promotion Board
Senior career
Years	Team	Caps	Goals
–	Railway Sports Promotion Board	-	-
National team
Years	Team	Caps	Goals
2018	India U18 Hockey5s	6	(4)
2018–2021	India U21	23	(0)
2022–	India	37	(0)
Medal record
Men's field hockey
Representing India
Asian Games
Gold medal – first place	2026 Aichi-Nagoya	Team
Asia Cup
Bronze medal – third place	2022 Jakarta

Yashdeep Siwach (born 26 December 2000) is an Indian field hockey player from Haryana. He plays as a defender for the Indian national team and represents Railway Sports Promotion Board in domestic tournaments.

== Early life ==
Yashdeep hails from Sonipat, Haryana. He is the son of former Indian women's hockey team captain Pritam Rani Siwach and Kuldeep Siwach, also a hockey player. He has a sister, Kanika. Inspired by his mother Pritam, he took up hockey at the age of 16.

He is brother of an field hockey player Saurabh.

== Career ==
Yashdeep made his youth India debut at the Asian Youth Olympic Qualifier, Bangkok, in 2018. Later, after attending a National camp at Bengaluru, he was selected to play the 2018 Sultan of Johor Cup where India won a silver medal. In 2021, he represented India at the FIH Odisha Hockey Men's Junior World Cup Bhubaneswar 2021, where India finished fourth. In June 2023, Hockey India announced its senior men core group of 39 players for the National Camp at SAI, Bengaluru and Yashdeep was included in the list.

When he is not participating in international hockey Yashdeep participates in local hockey competitions in Melbourne, Australia for the Mentone Hockey Club. He has stated in a local interview that one of his biggest inspirations besides his mom is a local player, Adam Wylie who he looks forward to playing with again in the future.
