= 2018 Asian Youth Olympic Games Qualifier (boys' field hockey) =

Tournament details
- Host country: Thailand
- City: Bangkok
- Dates: 25 – 29 April 2018
- Teams: 11
- Venue: Queen Sirikit 60th Anniversary Stadium

Final positions
- Champions: India
- Runner-up: Malaysia
- Third place: Bangladesh

Tournament statistics
- Matches played: 35
- Goals scored: 438 (12.51 per match)
- Top scorer(s): (Malaysia) Mohamad Anuar (India) Vivek Prasad (16 goals)

The 2018 Asian Youth Olympic Games Qualifier for boys' field hockey was held from 25 to 28 April 2018 in Bangkok, Thailand. Only the winner and runner qualified for the 2018 Youth Olympics.

== Qualified teams ==
- Bangladesh
- Cambodia
- Chinese Taipei
- Hong Kong
- India
- Japan
- Malaysia
- Pakistan
- Singapore
- South Korea
- Thailand

== Format ==
The eleven teams will be split into two groups of five and six teams. The top two teams advance to the semifinals to determine the winner in a knockout system. The third and fourth placed teams will play for the 5-8th place classification. The bottom three teams play for the 9-11th place classification.

== Results ==
All times are local (UTC+07:00).

=== First round ===
==== Pool A ====
| Pos | Team | Pld | W | D | L | GF | GA | GD | Pts | Qualification |
|---|---|---|---|---|---|---|---|---|---|---|
| 1 | India | 4 | 4 | 0 | 0 | 64 | 7 | +57 | 12 | Semifinals |
| 2 | South Korea | 4 | 3 | 0 | 1 | 34 | 22 | +12 | 9 | Semifinals |
| 3 | Japan | 4 | 2 | 0 | 2 | 26 | 12 | +14 | 6 | Fifth to eighth place game |
| 4 | Hong Kong | 4 | 1 | 0 | 3 | 5 | 45 | −40 | 3 | Fifth to eighth place game |
| 5 | Thailand | 4 | 0 | 0 | 4 | 8 | 51 | −43 | 0 | Eleventh place game |

Source: FIH
Rules for classification: 1) points; 2) goal difference; 3) goals scored; 4) head-to-head result.

25 April 2018
11:00

| Japan | 9–0 | Hong Kong |
|---|---|---|
| Kawahara 5', 25'; Matsumoto 9'; Nakahana 13', 29'; Tamura 18'; Niwa 21', 28'; Kobayashi 29' | Report |

Umpires:
Abdul Manan Pathan (PAK)
Phiraphat Niensupornphand (THA)

25 April 2018
12:00

| South Korea | 11–5 | Thailand |
|---|---|---|
| Cheon 2', 28'; Jeong 7', 9'; Jang 11', 18', 23'; Lee 12'; Chun 14'; Bae 29', 30' | Report | Tonmalee 9'; Salae 13'; Kongsakul 19'; Raroeng 28', 29' |

Umpires:
Bevan Nichol (NZL)
Muhammad Pial (BAN)

25 April 2018
18:00

| India | 25–0 | Thailand |
|---|---|---|
| Rajbhar 2', 12', 18', 22', 23'; Mohammad 4', 10', 17', 20', 25', 29'; Prasad 7', 9', 27', 28'; Sanjay 8', 14'; Moirangthem 10', 15', 20', 29'; Singh 11', 18'; Shivam 20'; Siwach 24' | Report |

Umpires:
Sean Edwards (ENG)
Ahmad Berhaumidin (MAS)

25 April 2018
18:00

| South Korea | 12–1 | Hong Kong |
|---|---|---|
| Chun 5', 14', 16', 18', 26'; Cheon 6', 20', 22', 28'; Bae 7', 11'; Jang 25' | Report | Tarala 7' |

Umpires:
Sunny Wang (SGP)
Chung Teng-wei (TPE)

26 April 2018
14:00

| Japan | 2–6 | India |
|---|---|---|
| Matsumoto 15'; Nakahana 30' | Report | Prasad 3', 13'; Moirangthem 8'; Rajbhar 8', 12'; Singh 9' |

Umpires:
Bevan Nichol (NZL)
Abdul Manan Pathan (PAK)

26 April 2018
18:00

| Hong Kong | 4–3 | Thailand |
|---|---|---|
| Shepherdson 1'; Mak 3', 24'; Laot 22' | Report | Deesa 16'; Pansarakam 27', 28' |

Umpires:
Sunny Wang (SGP)
Muhammad Pial (BAN)

27 April 2018
09:00

| India | 21–0 | Hong Kong |
|---|---|---|
| Prasad 1', 4', 22'; Rajbhar 4', 16'; Moirangthem 6'; Alishan 7', 7', 8', 17', 18', 30'; Siwach 9', 15', 25'; Sanjay 10', 14', 21'; Anand 12', 12', 23' | Report |

Umpires:
Ahmad Berhaumidin (MAS)
Chung Teng-wei (TPE)

27 April 2018
10:00

| Japan | 4–6 | South Korea |
|---|---|---|
| Niwa 12'; Kobayashi 22'; Nakahana 26'; Tanikawa 28' | Report | Bae 8', 14', 20', 26'; Jeong 24'; Choi 25' |

Umpires:
Abdul Manan Pathan (PAK)
Sean Edwards (ENG)

27 April 2018
16:00

| South Korea | 5–12 | India |
|---|---|---|
| Song 5'; Bae 6'; Jang 13'; Cheon 26'; Jeong 28' | Report | Prasad 2', 8', 16', 22'; Alishan 6'; Sanjay 7', 15'; Singh 9', 17', 30'; Rajbhar 12', 28' |

Umpires:
Bevan Nichol(NZL)
Abdul Manan Pathan (PAK)

27 April 2018
18:00

| Thailand | 0–11 | Japan |
|---|---|---|
| | Report | Tamura 3'; Matsumoto 9'; Kawahara 13', 25', 26'; Furukawa 14', 29'; Kobayashi 17'; Tanikawa 20'; Nakahana 26'; Niwa 30' |

Umpires:
Muhammad Pial (BAN)
Sunny Wang (SGP)

==== Pool B ====
| Pos | Team | Pld | W | D | L | GF | GA | GD | Pts | Qualification |
|---|---|---|---|---|---|---|---|---|---|---|
| 1 | Malaysia | 5 | 5 | 0 | 0 | 59 | 6 | +53 | 15 | Semifinals |
| 2 | Bangladesh | 5 | 3 | 1 | 1 | 49 | 16 | +33 | 10 | Semifinals |
| 3 | Pakistan | 5 | 2 | 2 | 1 | 32 | 18 | +14 | 8 | Fifth to eighth place game |
| 4 | Chinese Taipei | 5 | 2 | 1 | 2 | 39 | 28 | +11 | 7 | Fifth to eighth place game |
| 5 | Singapore | 5 | 1 | 0 | 4 | 20 | 32 | −12 | 3 | Ninth place game |
| 6 | Cambodia | 5 | 0 | 0 | 5 | 2 | 101 | −99 | 0 | Ninth to eleventh place game |

Source: FIH
Rules for classification: 1) points; 2) goal difference; 3) goals scored; 4) head-to-head result.

25 April 2018
14:00

| Malaysia | 23–0 | Cambodia |
|---|---|---|
| Rosdi 5', 18'; Alfarico 6', 24'; Azahar 7', 26', 27', 27', 28', 29'; Anuar 9', 10', 13', 23'; Kamaruddin 10', 25'; Mat Tee 12', 20', 24'; Ishak 15', 28'; Moharam 16', 17' | Report |

Umpires:
Rafaqat Shahzad (HKG)
Tomohiro Hirayama (JPN)

25 April 2018
15:00

| Bangladesh | 10–4 | Singapore |
|---|---|---|
| Mohsin 4', 21', 30'; Uddin 5', 14'; Sawon 8', 10'; Alam 13', 16'; Raqibul 26' | Report | Zulkarnain 6', 16'; Hariraj 12', 20' |

Umpires:
Tarun Yadav (IND)
Jung Young-min (KOR)

25 April 2018
15:00

| Pakistan | 3–3 | Chinese Taipei |
|---|---|---|
| Hammadudin 11', 20'; Khan 15' | Report | Shih 3', 26'; Huang J. 21' |

Umpires:
Bevan Nichol (NZL)
Phiraphat Niensupornphand (THA)

26 April 2018
09:00

| Cambodia | 0–20 | Bangladesh |
|---|---|---|
| | Report | Raqibul 3', 5', 10', 23'; Alam 4', 7', 8', 9', 14', 26', 29'; Sarowar 6', 20', 25'; Prince 9', 27'; Mohsin 15'; Uddin 16', 28'; Mehdi 21' |

Umpires:
Sean Edwards (ENG)
Tarun Yadav (IND)

26 April 2018
10:00

| Pakistan | 5–0 | Singapore |
|---|---|---|
| Hammadudin 6', 18'; Murtaza 24', 26', 30' | Report |

Umpires:
Jung Young-min (KOR)
Tomohiro Hirayama (JPN)

26 April 2018
10:00

| Malaysia | 10–0 | Chinese Taipei |
|---|---|---|
| Azahar 6', 17'; Rosdi 10'; Anuar 22', 30'; Mat Tee 24'; Ishak 26', 28'; Moharam 27', 28' | Report |

Umpires:
Rafaqat Shahzad (HKG)
Phiraphat Niensupornphand (THA)

26 April 2018
16:00

| Cambodia | 0–20 | Pakistan |
|---|---|---|
| | Report | Murtaza 3', 4', 13'; Hammadudin 7', 7', 19', 20', 29', 30'; Khan 7', 8', 11'; Waqas 13', 15', 23', 24'; Zulqarnain 18', 27', 28'; Ullah 25' |

Umpires:
Jung Young-min (KOR)
Phiraphat Niensupornphand (THA)

26 April 2018
16:00

| Bangladesh | 4–7 | Malaysia |
|---|---|---|
| Alam 3'; Sarowar 11', 14'; Shohanur 28' | Report | Rosdi 7', 26', 27', 29'; Anuar 10', 12', 20' |

Umpires:
Tarun Yadav (IND)
Rafaqat Shahzad (HKG)

26 April 2018
18:00

| Singapore | 3–8 | Chinese Taipei |
|---|---|---|
| Prebhash 10', 12'; Tan 26' | Report | Kao 3'; Chen 4', 20'; Liu 10', 25', 27'; Hsieh 17'; Shih 30' |

Umpires:
Sean Edwards (ENG)
Tomohiro Hirayama (JPN)

27 April 2018
09:00

| Singapore | 12–2 | Cambodia |
|---|---|---|
| Zulkarnain 6', 7', 21', 27'; Prebhash 8', 26'; Loo 10'; Vijayan 11'; Tan 18', 27'; Watanabe 26'; Kumar 29' | Report | Oudom 12'; Ketpovin 23' |

Umpires:
Rafaqat Shahzad (HKG)
Tomohiro Hirayama (JPN)

27 April 2018
10:00

| Pakistan | 1–12 | Malaysia |
|---|---|---|
| Khan 7' | Report | Ishak 5', 25'; Azahar 5', 10', 19'; Anuar 12', 22', 25'; Rosdi 13', 24', 29'; Kamaruddin 19' |

Umpires:
Tarun Yadav (IND)
Bevan Nichol (NZL)

27 April 2018
11:00

| Chinese Taipei | 2–12 | Bangladesh |
|---|---|---|
| Yu 18'; Hsieh 27' | Report | Shohanur 2', 14'; Sarowar 5', 10'; Prince 7', 10', 22', 23', 29'; Alam 16', 30'; Uddin 26' |

Umpires:
Jung Young-min (KOR)
Phiraphat Niensupornphand (THA)

27 April 2018
16:00

| Malaysia | 7–1 | Singapore |
|---|---|---|
| Azahar 4'; Kamaruddin 7'; Mat Tee 15'; Anuar 17'; Rosdi 19', 29'; Ishak 20' | Report | Tan 28' |

Umpires:
Tomohiro Hirayama (JPN)
Rafaqat Shahzad (HKG)

27 April 2018
17:00

| Chinese Taipei | 26–0 | Cambodia |
|---|---|---|
| Hsieh 1', 11', 24', 26'; Shih 2', 3', 10', 10', 14', 30'; Huang C. 2'; Huang J. 5', 11'; Liu 6', 9', 15'; Chen 15', 16', 19'; Yu 17', 18', 28', 28', 28', 29', 30' | Report |

Umpires:
Tarun Yadav (IND)
Jung Young-min (KOR)

27 April 2018
18:00

| Bangladesh | 3–3 | Pakistan |
|---|---|---|
| Shohanur 11', 30'; Uddin 28' | Report | Zulqarnain 7'; Murtaza 10', 25' |

Umpires:
Sean Edwards (ENG)
Phiraphat Neinsupornphand (THA)

=== Second round ===
==== Ninth to eleventh place classification ====
9–11th place semifinals
28 April
Thailand | 9
Cambodia | 0

Ninth place
29 April
Singapore | 4
Thailand | 2

==== Crossover ====
28 April 2018
13:00

| Thailand | 9–0 | Cambodia |
|---|---|---|
| Salae 5', 13'; Deesa 7'; Khemakapasiddhi 8', 11'; Tonmalee 10'; Kongsakul 17'; Chaiyasit 19'; Pansarakam 23' | Report |

Umpires:
Muhammad Pial (BAN)
Chung Teng-Wei (TPE)

==== Ninth and tenth place ====
29 April 2018
10:00

| Singapore | 4–2 | Thailand |
|---|---|---|
| Zulkarnain 1', 26'; Prebhash 9'; Vijayan 29' | Report | Kongsakul 11'; Salae 17' |

Umpires:
Rafaqat Shahzad (HKG)
Jung Young Min (KOR)

==== Fifth to eighth place classification ====
5th–8th place semifinals
28 April
Japan | 10
Chinese Taipei | 4
28 April
Pakistan | 10
Hong Kong | 1

5th place
29 April
Japan | 7
Pakistan | 5
7th place
29 April
Chinese Taipei | 10
Hong Kong | 2

==== Crossover ====
28 April 2018
12:00

| Japan | 10–4 | Chinese Taipei |
|---|---|---|
| Niwa 3', 29'; Nakahana 5'; Tamura 6'; Tanikawa 10', 18'; Kawahara 14', 26', 27'; Matsumoto 19' | Report | Hsieh 8', 19'; Huang J. 20'; Shih 22' |

Umpires:
Ahmad Berhaumidin (MAS)
Phiraphat Niensupornphand (THA)

28 April 2018
13:00

| Pakistan | 10–1 | Hong Kong |
|---|---|---|
| Waqas 1', 10', 29'; Murtaza 9', 18'; Hammadudin 12'; Khan 14', 25'; Zulqarnain 29' | Report | Shepherdson 13' |

Umpires:
Sunny Wang (SGP)
Jung Young Min (KOR)

==== Seventh and eighth place ====
29 April 2018
12:00

| Chinese Taipei | 10–2 | Hong Kong |
|---|---|---|
| Hsieh 2', 29'; Yu 6', 16'; Huang J. 11'; Shih 13', 22', 30'; Huang C. 14'; Kao 18' | Report | Mak 1'; Farooq 25' |

Umpires:
Abdul Manan Pathan (PAK)
Sunny Wang (SGP)

==== Fifth and sixth place ====
29 April 2018
13:00

| Japan | 7–5 | Pakistan |
|---|---|---|
| Matsutomo 4'; Nakahana 14', 23', 30'; Furukawa 15'; Tanikawa 19'; Niwa 29' | Report | Murtaza 1', 25'; M. Khan 16'; Waqas 18'; Zulqarnain 19' |

Umpires:
Ahmad Berhaumidin (MAS)
Phiraphat Niensupornphand (THA)

==== First to fourth place classification ====
Semi-finals
28 April
India | 9
Bangladesh | 2
28 April
Malaysia (p.s.o.) | 4 (5)
South Korea | 4 (4)

Final
29 April
India (p.s.o.) | 4 (2)
Malaysia | 4 (1)
Third place
29 April
Bangladesh | 5
South Korea | 4

==== Semifinals ====
28 April 2018
17:00

| India | 9–2 | Bangladesh |
|---|---|---|
| Anand 5', 8', 15', 24'; Rajbhar 22', 23'; Singh 22'; Prasad 24'; Alishan 26' | Report | Shohanur 23', 29' |

Umpires:
Bevan Nichol (NZL)
Tomohiro Hirayama (JPN)

28 April 2018
18:00

| Malaysia | 4–4 | South Korea |
|---|---|---|
| Anuar 4', 7'; Rosdi 6'; Azahar 22' | Report | Bae 2'; Chun 5'; Lee S. 12'; Jang 26' |
Penalties
| Anuar (penalty shoot-out scored); Mat Tee (penalty shoot-out missed); Azahar (penalty shoot-out scored); Anuar (penalty shoot-out scored); Azahar (penalty shoot-out scored); Mat Tee (penalty shoot-out scored) | 5–4 | (penalty shoot-out scored) Bae; (penalty shoot-out missed) Jang; (penalty shoot-out scored) Chun; (penalty shoot-out scored) Bae; (penalty shoot-out scored) Jang; (penalty shoot-out missed) Chun |

Umpires:
Tarun Yadav (IND)
Sean Edwards (ENG)

==== Third and fourth place ====
29 April 2018
15:00

| Bangladesh | 5–4 | South Korea |
|---|---|---|
| Uddin 4'; Sarowar 9'; Mehdi 9'; Shohanur 12', 27' | Report | Cheon 19'; Lee S. Choi 24'; Jeong 27' |

Umpires:
Tarun Yadav (IND)
Tomohiro Hirayama (JPN)

==== Final ====
29 April 2018
17:00

| India | 4–4 | Malaysia |
|---|---|---|
| Rajbhar 12', 20'; Prasad 14', 18' | Report | Anuar 11'; Moharam 15'; Rosdi 26', 30' |
Penalties
| Moirangthem (penalty shoot-out scored); Rajbhar (penalty shoot-out scored) | 2–1 | (penalty shoot-out scored) Anuar; (penalty shoot-out missed) Azahar; (penalty shoot-out missed) Rosdi |

Umpires:
Bevan Nichol (NZL)
Sean Edwards (ENG)

== Final standings ==
| Pos | Team | |
|---|---|---|
| 1st place, gold medalist(s) | India | Qualified to the 2018 Youth Olympics |
| 2nd place, silver medalist(s) | Malaysia | Qualified to the 2018 Youth Olympics |
| 3rd place, bronze medalist(s) | Bangladesh | |
| 4 | South Korea | |
| 5 | Japan | |
| 6 | Pakistan | |
| 7 | Chinese Taipei | |
| 8 | Hong Kong | |
| 9 | Singapore | |
| 10 | Thailand | |
| 11 | Cambodia | |

Source: FIH
