= 2026 Men's FIH Youth Hockey5s World Cup =

1st edition of the Men's FIH Youth Hockey5s World Cup

Tournament details
- Host country: Egypt
- City: Cairo
- Dates: 7–12 December 2026
- Teams: 12 (from 4 confederations)
- Venue: Cairo International Stadium

The 2026 Men's FIH Youth Hockey5s World Cup will be the first edition of the Men's FIH Youth Hockey5s World Cup, the men's under-18 hockey5s world championship organized by the International Hockey Federation. The tournament will feature 12 teams. Cairo in Egypt will host the tournament from 7th to 12th December 2026.

All matches will be live-streamed on the Watch.Hockey app.

== Qualification ==
=== Qualified teams ===
Dates	Event	Location	Quotas	Qualifier(s)
	Hosts	—N/a	1	Egypt
20–25 July 2026	2026 Youth Asian Championship	Muscat, Oman	3	Bangladesh; India; Iran; ~~Pakistan~~
6–8 August 2026	2026 Youth Africa Cup	Nairobi, Kenya	3	Kenya; Nigeria; South Africa
			3	Austria; Poland; Switzerland
			2	Chile; Uruguay
Total			12	

== Group stage ==
Tie-breaking criteria for group stage ranking
The ranking of teams in each group will be determined by the points obtained in all group matches. If two or more teams are equal on points, the following criteria will be used to determine the ranking:

1) points; 2) matches won; 3) goal difference; 4) goals for; 5) head-to-head result; 6) field goals for.

=== Pool A ===
Pos	Team	Pld	W	D	L	GF	GA	GD	Pts	Qualification
1	Nigeria	0	0	0	0	0	0	0	0	Semi-finals
2	Poland	0	0	0	0	0	0	0	0	Possible Semi-finals based on ranking
3	South Africa	0	0	0	0	0	0	0	0	Possible 5/8 Classification based on ranking
4	Uruguay	0	0	0	0	0	0	0	0	9/12 classification

First match(es) will be played: 9 December 2026. Source:

=== Pool B ===
Pos	Team	Pld	W	D	L	GF	GA	GD	Pts	Qualification
1	Bangladesh	0	0	0	0	0	0	0	0	Semi-finals
2	Chile	0	0	0	0	0	0	0	0	Possible Semi-finals based on ranking
3	India	0	0	0	0	0	0	0	0	Possible 5/8 Classification based on ranking
4	Switzerland	0	0	0	0	0	0	0	0	9/12 classification

First match(es) will be played: 9 December 2026. Source:

=== Pool C ===
Pos	Team	Pld	W	D	L	GF	GA	GD	Pts	Qualification
1	Austria	0	0	0	0	0	0	0	0	Semi-finals
2	Egypt (H)	0	0	0	0	0	0	0	0	Possible Semi-finals based on ranking
3	Iran	0	0	0	0	0	0	0	0	Possible 5/8 Classification based on ranking
4	Kenya	0	0	0	0	0	0	0	0	9/12 classification

First match(es) will be played: 9 December 2026. Source:
(H) Hosts

=== Ranking of second-placed teams ===
The best second-placed team from the groups will advance to the medal round along with the three group winners.

Pos	Grp	Team	Pld	W	D	L	GF	GA	GD	Pts	Qualification
1	A	A2	0	0	0	0	0	0	0	0	Advance to Semi-finals
2	B	B2	0	0	0	0	0	0	0	0	5/8 classification
3	C	C2	0	0	0	0	0	0	0	0	5/8 classification

First match(es) will be played: 10 December 2026. Source:

=== Ranking of third-placed teams ===
The two best third-placed teams from the groups will advance to the fifth place classification.

Pos	Grp	Team	Pld	W	D	L	GF	GA	GD	Pts	Qualification
1	A	A3	0	0	0	0	0	0	0	0	5/8 classification
2	B	B3	0	0	0	0	0	0	0	0	5/8 classification
3	C	C3	0	0	0	0	0	0	0	0	9/12 classification

First match(es) will be played: 10 December 2026. Source:

== Classification round ==
=== Fifth to eighth place ===
Crossover
12 December
12 December

Fifth place
12 December
Seventh place
12 December

=== Ninth to twelfth place ===
Crossover
12 December
12 December

Ninth place
12 December
Eleventh place
12 December

== Medal round ==
Semi-finals
11 December
11 December

Gold medal match
12 December
Bronze medal match
12 December
