= Hockey Association of Odisha =

Field Hockey Organization in Odisha State, India

- ଓଡିଶାର ହକି ଆସୋସିଏସନ୍
- Sport: Field hockey
- Jurisdiction: Odisha
- Membership: 30 district association
- Abbreviation: HAO
- Affiliation: HI
- Headquarters: Kalinga Stadium Complex, Nayapali Bhubaneswar, Odisha 751012
- Location: Bhubaneswar, Odisha
- President: Dilip Tirkey
- Secretary: Sanatan Sahu
- Coach: Edgar Mascaren

Official website
- hockeyassociationofodisha.com

The Hockey Association of Odisha (Odia: ଓଡିଶାର ହକି ଆସୋସିଏସନ୍) is the governing body of field hockey in the Odisha state of India and the Odisha field hockey team (Odia: ଓଡିଶା ହକି ଟିମ୍). Hockey Association of Odisha is the state member unit of Hockey India. The Odisha hockey team has maintained its dominance in field hockey in India as the most successful team of Hockey India Championships. Hockey Odisha has given India some of its best players including Anupa Barla, Binita Toppo, Birendra Lakra, Dilip Tirkey, Ignace Tirkey, Jyoti Sunita Kullu, Lazarus Barla, Prabodh Tirkey, Subhadra Pradhan and Amit Rohidas. Odisha is now the capital of Indian hockey.

== Home Grounds ==
Name	City	Capacity	Image
Birsa Munda International Hockey Stadium	Rourkela	21,800	
Kalinga Hockey Stadium	Bhubaneswar	16,000	
Biju Patnaik Hockey Stadium	Rourkela	15,000	

== Administration ==
HAO Executive Board
Member	Designation
Dilip Tirkey	President
Jeeban Mohanty	Vice-president
Sanatan Sahu	Secretary
Lucela Ekka	Joint-secretary
PK Mohanty	Treasurer
Ranjan Das	Executive Member
Rina R Tirkey	Executive Member
Gouree Panda	Executive Member
Bharat Sahoo	Executive Member

=== District Associations ===
Full Members of the Odisha District Hockey Association
District	Governing Body
Nuapada	Nuapada District Hockey Association
Anugul	Angul District Hockey Association
Boudh	Boudh District Hockey Association
Jharsuguda	Jharsuguda District Hockey Association
Kandhamal	Kandhamal District Hockey Association
Kendrapada	Kendrapada District Hockey Association
Mayurbhanj	Mayurbhanj District Hockey Association
Nabarangpur	Nabarangpur District Hockey Association
Nayagarh	Nayagarh District Hockey Association
Puri	Puri District Hockey Association
Sambalpur	Sambalpur District Hockey Association
Dhenkanal	Dhenkanal District Hockey Association
Jagatsinghpur	Jagatsinghpur District Hockey Association
Sundargarh	Sundargarh District Hockey Association
Keonjhar	Keonjhar District Hockey Association
Bargarh	Bargarh District Hockey Association
Khagaria	Khagaria District Hockey Association
Cuttack	Cuttack District Hockey Association
Malkangiri	Malkangiri District Hockey Association
Gajapati	Gajapati District Hockey Association
Balasore	Balasore District Hockey Association
Balangir	Balangir District Hockey Association
Subarnapur	Subarnapur District Hockey Association
Khurda	Khurda District Hockey Association
Deogarh	Deogarh District Hockey Association
Kalahandi	Kalahandi District Hockey Association
Rayagada	Rayagada District Hockey Association
Koraput	Koraput District Hockey Association
Bhadrak	Bhadrak District Hockey Association
Jajpur	Jajpur District Hockey Association

== Tally ==
=== Overall ===
Overall Record
Championship	Gold	Silver	Bronze
Hockey India Senior Men National Hockey Championship	1	0	1
Hockey India Senior Women National Championship	1	0	1
Hockey India Junior Men National Championship	5	5	0
Hockey India Junior Women National Championship	1	0	1
Hockey India Sub Junior Men National Championship	9	1	1
Hockey India Sub Junior Women National Championship	1	2	4
Hockey India Sub Junior Boys National Championship	2	0	0
Hockey India Sub Junior Girls National Championship	0	0	1
Overall	19	8	9

== State team performances at National Level ==
=== 2011 ===
Championship	Rank	Venue
1st Hockey India Senior Women National Championship; 1st Hockey India Sub Junior Women National Championship - East Zone; 1st Hockey India Sub Junior Men National Championship - East Zone; 1st Hockey India Junior Women National Championship; 1st Hockey India Junior Men National Championship; 1st Hockey India Sub Junior Boys National Championship; 1st Hockey India Sub Junior Girls National Championship	3; 1; 2; 4; 2; 1 3	Sonipat, Haryana; Patna, Bihar; Patna, Bihar; Sonipat, Haryana; Pune, Maharashtra; Gurgaon, Haryana; Rajnandgaon, Chhattisgarh

=== 2012 ===
Championship	Rank	Venue
2nd Hockey India Junior Men National Championship; 2nd Hockey India Sub Junior Men National Championship - East Zone; 2nd Hockey India Sub Junior Women National Championship - East Zone; 2nd Hockey India Sub Junior Boys National Championship	2; 1; 3 1	Lucknow, Uttar Pradesh; Patna, Bihar; Patna, Bihar; Rohtak, Haryana

=== 2013 ===
Championship	Rank	Venue
3rd Hockey India Sub Junior Men National Championship - East Zone; 3rd Hockey India Sub Junior Women National Championship - East Zone; 3rd Hockey India Sub Junior Men National Championship Finals; 3rd Hockey India Junior Men National Championship	2; 2; 1 2	Nagaon, Assam; Nagaon, Assam; Bhopal, Madhya Pradesh; Sonipat, Haryana

=== 2014 ===
Championship	Rank	Venue
4th Hockey India Senior Men National Championship - B Division; 4th Hockey India Junior Women National Championship - B Division; 4th Hockey India Junior Women National Championship - A Division; 4th Hockey India Junior Men National Championship - A Division; 4th Hockey India Sub Junior Men National Championship - B Division; 4th Hockey India Sub Junior Women National Championship - B Division; 4th Hockey India Sub Junior Men National Championship - A Division	1; 3; 4; 2; 1; 1 1	Lucknow, Uttar Pradesh; Mysore, Karnataka; Mysore, Karnataka; Chennai, Tamil Nadu; Vadodara, Gujarat; Haldwani, Uttarakhand; Ranchi, Jharkhand

=== 2015 ===
Championship	Rank	Venue
5th Hockey India Junior Men National Championship - B Division; 5th Hockey India Junior Men National Championship - A Division; 5th Hockey India Senior Men National Championship - A Division; 5th Hockey India Junior Women National Championship - B Division; 5th Hockey India Junior Women National Championship - A Division; 5th Hockey India Sub Junior Men National Championship - A Division - Hockey Gangpur Odisha; 5th Hockey India Sub Junior Men National Championship - A Division - Hockey Odisha; 5th Hockey India Sub Junior Women National Championship - A Division	1; 1; 4; 1; 4; 3; 1 3	Mysore, Karnataka; Mysore, Karnataka; Pune, Maharashtra; Rajnandgaon, Chhattisgarh; Rajnandgaon, Chhattisgarh; New Delhi, India; New Delhi, India; Ranchi, Jharkhand

=== 2016 ===
Championship	Rank	Venue
6th Hockey India Senior Women National Championship 2016 - B Division - Hockey Gangpur Odisha; 6th Hockey India Senior Women National Championship 2016 - A Division - Hockey Odisha; 6th Hockey India Senior Men National Championship 2016 - A Division; 6th Hockey India Junior Men National Championship - A Division - Hockey Odisha; 6th Hockey India Junior Men National Championship - A Division - Hockey Gangpur Odisha; 6th Hockey India Sub Junior Men National Championship - A Division; 6th Hockey India Junior Women National Championship 2016 - A Division	1; 3; 3; 1; 2; 1 3	Bangalore, Karnataka; Bangalore, Karnataka; Saifai, Uttar Pradesh; Raipur, Chhattisgarh; Raipur, Chhattisgarh; Imphal, Manipur; Ranchi, Jharkhand

=== 2017 ===
Championship	Rank	Venue
7th Hockey India Junior Men National Championship 2017 - A Division - Hockey Odisha; 7th Hockey India Sub Junior Men National Championship 2017 - A Division - Hockey Odisha	1 4	Bhopal, Madhya Pradesh; Bangalore, Karnataka

=== 2018 ===
Championship	Rank	Venue
8th Hockey India Sub Junior Men National Championship 2018 - A Division - Hockey Odisha; 8th Hockey India Sub Junior Women National Championship 2018 - A Division - Hockey Gangpur Odisha	1 3	Saifai, Uttar Pradesh; Hisar, Haryana

=== 2019 ===
Championship	Rank	Venue
9th Hockey India Junior Men National Championship 2019 - A Division - Hockey Odisha 9th Hockey India Sub Junior Men National Championship 2018 - A Division - Hockey Odisha	1; 1	Aurangabad, Maharashtra; Raipur, Chhattisgarh
