= Senior National Hockey Championship =

- Sport: Field hockey
- Founded: M: 1928; 98 years ago W: 1947; 79 years ago
- First season: 1928
- Administrator: Hockey India (since 2011); Indian Hockey Federation (1928–2010)
- Country: India
- Most recent champions: M: Punjab (21st title); W: Jharkhand (1st title)
- Most titles: M: Railways (25 titles); W: Railways (8 titles)
- Broadcasters: FanCode; Hockey India (YouTube)
- Website: hockeyindia.org
- 2024

The Senior National Hockey Championship is a state-level national field hockey competition contested by the state associations under Hockey India, the sport's governing body in India. It was first held in 1928 under the aegis of Indian Hockey Federation (IHF), the former Indian field hockey federation and was also known as Rangaswamy Cup. Since 2011, it has been organised by Hockey India under the name of Hockey India Senior National Championship.

== History ==
In 1928, the Indian Hockey Federation organised the first national championship at Calcutta which was won by United Provinces. The competition was held biennially until 1944 following which it was held annually. During the Indian hockey team tour to New Zealand in 1935, the Maoris offered a shield to the team which was hence awarded to the winners of the National Championships. This shield won by Punjab in 1947 but was never returned by Pakistan following partition. In 1951, Madras hosted the National Championships for the first time and a new trophy was donated by the proprietors of The Hindu group.

In April 2020, Hockey India announced a restructuring of its national championships effective from 2021, separating state associations from departmental teams, which had previously competed in the same championships. The latter were assigned a separate Senior Inter-Department National Championship, whose inaugural senior men's edition began in December 2021.

== Results ==
=== Men's championships ===
The results of the Senior National Hockey Championship:

Indian Hockey Federation (1928–2010)
Year	Winner	Runner-up
1928	United Provinces	Rajputana
1930	Railways	Punjab
1932	Punjab	Bengal
1934	Not Played	
1936	Bengal	Manavadar
1938	Bengal	Bhopal
1940	Bombay	Delhi
1942	Delhi	Punjab
1944	Bombay	Gwalior
1945	Bhopal	United Provinces
1946	Punjab	Delhi
1947	Punjab	Bombay
1948	Bhopal	Bombay
1949	Punjab	Bengal
1950	Punjab	Bhopal
1951	Punjab	Services
1952	Bengal	Punjab
1953	Services	Punjab
1954	Punjab	Services
1955	Services and Madras were joint winners	
1956	Services	Uttar Pradesh
1957	Railways	Bombay
1958	Railways	Bombay
1959	Railways	Services
1960	Services	Uttar Pradesh
1961	Railways	Services
1962	Punjab	Bhopal
1963	Railways	Services
1964	Railways	Services
1965	Punjab	Bombay
1966	Services and Railways were joint winners	
1967	Railways and Madras were joint winners	
1968	Railways	Mysore
1969	Punjab	Railways
1970	Punjab and Railways were joint winners	
1971	Punjab	Bombay
1972	Punjab	Railways
1973	Services	Railways
1974	Railways	Tamil Nadu
1975	Railways	Tamil Nadu
1976	Railways	Services
1977	Indian Airlines Corporation and Railways were joint winners	
1978	Indian Airlines Corporation	Railways
1979	Indian Airlines Corporation	Railways
1980	Railways	Indian Airlines
1981	Punjab	Railways
1982	Punjab	Indian Airlines
1983	Punjab	Bombay
1984	Indian Airlines	Services
1985	Services	Punjab
1986	Indian Airlines	Railways
1987	Railways	Punjab
1988	Railways	Indian Airlines
1989	Bombay	Punjab
1990	Railways	Punjab
1991	Not Played	
1992	Services	Indian Airlines
1993	Railways	Services
1994	Indian Airlines	Bombay
1995–96	Not Played	
1997	Railways	Tamil Nadu
1998	Not Played	
1999	Indian Airlines	Tamil Nadu
2000	Indian Airlines	Railways
2001–04	Not Played	
2005	Punjab and Sindh Bank	Indian Oil
2006	Punjab and Sindh Bank	Delhi
2007–09	Not Played	
2010	Mumbai	Haryana

Hockey India (2011–present)
Year	Winner	Runner-up	Third place
2011	Haryana	Karnataka	Punjab
2012	Punjab	Air India	Karnataka
2013	Air India	Punjab	Karnataka
2014	Air India	Comptroller and Auditor General of India	Uttar Pradesh
2015	Railways	Uttar Pradesh	Air India
2016	Railways	Punjab	Odisha
2017	Railways	Punjab and Sind Bank	Punjab
2018	Punjab	Petroleum Sports Promotion Board	Railways
2019	Railways	Punjab	Petroleum Sports Promotion Board
2020	Services	Air India	Petroleum Sports Promotion Board
2021	Punjab	Uttar Pradesh	Karnataka
2022	Haryana	Tamil Nadu	Karnataka
2023	Punjab	Haryana	Tamil Nadu
2024	Odisha	Haryana	Uttar Pradesh
2025	Punjab	Madhya Pradesh	Uttar Pradesh

=== Women's championships ===
Women's nationals have been held since 1947 under IWHF/IHF until the start of HI championships,
but the statistics are yet to be integrated here due to lack of coverage and reports.

Hockey India (2011–present)
Year	Winner	Runner-up	Third place
2011	Railways	Haryana	Odisha
2012	Railways	Haryana	Jharkhand
2013	Haryana	Railways	Jharkhand
2014	Railways	Haryana	Jharkhand
2015	Railways	Jharkhand	Punjab
2016	Railways	Punjab	Madhya Pradesh Hockey Academy
2017	Railways	Haryana	Madhya Pradesh
2018	Railways	Madhya Pradesh	Haryana
2019	Railways	Madhya Pradesh	Haryana
2020	Haryana	Sports Authority of India	Madhya Pradesh Hockey Academy
2021	Madhya Pradesh	Haryana	Punjab
2022	Odisha	Karnataka	Jharkhand
2023	Madhya Pradesh	Maharashtra	Jharkhand
2024	Haryana	Maharashtra	Jharkhand
2025	Jharkhand	Haryana	Mizoram

== Performance by teams ==
=== Men's ===
Includes both IHF and HI championships.

Team	Championships
Railways	25
Punjab	21
Services	9
Indian Airlines	8
Maharashtra / Mumbai / Bombay	4
West Bengal / Bengal	3
Haryana	2
Air India	2
Tamil Nadu / Madras	2
Madhya Pradesh / Bhopal	2
Punjab and Sind Bank	2
Uttar Pradesh / United Provinces	1
Delhi	1
Odisha	1

=== Women's ===
Includes only HI championships.

Team	Championships
Railways	8
Haryana	3
Madhya Pradesh	2
Odisha	1
Jharkhand	1
