= Men's U18 Hockey5's Asia Cup =

- Most recent season or competition: 2026 Men's U18 Hockey5's Asia Cup
- Sport: Hockey5s
- Founded: 2026; 0 years ago
- First season: 2026
- No. of teams: 7
- Confederation: AHF (Asia)
- Most recent champion: India (2026)
- Most titles: India (1 Title)

The Men's U18 Hockey5's Asia Cup is an under-18 youth international Hockey5's tournament organized by the Asian Hockey Federation. The event is played in Hockey 5s format, a 5-a-side game that is played on a smaller field size. The winning team becomes the champion of Asia and qualifies for the FIH U18 Youth Hockey5's World Cup.

The first edition took place in Muscat from 20–25 July 2026, won by India.

== Results ==
#	Year	Host	Final			Third place match			Teams
#	Year	Host	Winner	Score	Runner-up	Third place	Score	Fourth place	Teams
1	2026; Details	Muscat, Oman	India	3–1	Pakistan	Iran	4–2	Bangladesh	7

== Successful national teams ==
Teams reaching the top four
Team	Champions	Runners-up	Third place	Fourth place
India	1 (2026)			
Pakistan		1 (2026)		
Iran			1 (2026)	
Bangladesh				1 (2026)

* = host country

=== Team appearances ===
Team	(Oman) 2026	Total
Bangladesh	4th	1
India	1st	1
Iran	3rd	1
Iraq	6th	1
Oman	5th	1
Pakistan	2nd	1
Saudi Arabia	7th	1
Total (7)	7	

=== Debut of teams ===
Year	Debutants	Total
2026	Bangladesh, India, Iran, Iraq, Oman, Pakistan, Saudi Arabia	7
Total		7

== See also ==
- Women's U18 Hockey5's Asia Cup
- Men's Hockey U18 Asia Cup
- Men's Hockey5s Asia Cup
