= 2026 Women's Asian Champions Trophy =

International field hockey tournament in India

Tournament details
- Host country: India
- City: Barkheda Nathu, Bhopal
- Dates: 19–28 November
- Teams: 6 (from 1 confederation)
- Venue: Nathu Barkheda International Sports Complex

Tournament statistics
- Matches played: 9
- Goals scored: 38 (4.22 per match)
- Top scorer(s): (India) Deepika (India) Mumtaz Khan (3 goals)
All statistics are correct as of 22 November 2026
← 2024 (previous)

The 2026 Women's Asian Champions Trophy (officially known as Madhya Pradesh Women's Asian Champions Trophy Bhopal 2026 for sponsorship reasons) is the ninth edition of the Women's Asian Champions Trophy, a biennial field hockey tournament where the six best Asian women's national teams compete. It will be organized by the Asian Hockey Federation. Bhopal in India is hosting its first international tournament, from 19 to 28 November 2026. India hosts the Women's Asian Champions Trophy for the third consecutive time

The hosts India are the defending champions, having won the previous two editions.

The Government of Madhya Pradesh secured the presenting partner rights for the tournament from Hockey India.

== Venue ==
Hockey stadium at the International Sports Complex in Nathu Barkheda village of Bhopal hosts the tournament.

(India) Bhopal
Nathu Barkheda International Sports Complex
Capacity: 4,000

== Teams ==
The top six ranked nations of the Asian Hockey Federation compete in the tournament.

Country	FIH Ranking	Most Recent Appearance	Best Finish
China	4	2024	Runners-up (2011, 2016, 2024)
India	7	2024	Champions (2016, 2023, 2024)
Japan	11	2024	Champions (2013, 2021)
South Korea	15	2024	Champions (2010, 2011, 2018)
Malaysia	21	2024	Third place (2013)
Thailand	28	2024	Fourth place (2021)

== Squads ==
China

Head Coach: (China) Long Fengyu

14. Zhang Heyang
40. Zhang Mengyao (GK)
42. Jing Keqing
45. Zhang Wenli
46. Cai Wenqian
53. Chen Tong
55. Chen Yujun
59. Deng Qiuchan
60. Zhang Jing
61. Fang Haixuan (GK)
66. Feng Qingmiao
68. Tan Lei
69. Sun Chang
71. Li Xinting
72. Zuo Dandan
74. Zhu Sensen
75. Han Ruibing
76. Feng Jiaxin
78. Wei Qixiao (C)
80. Zhang Xue
India

Head Coach: (Netherlands) Sjoerd Marijne

2. Jyoti Singh
6. Ishika Chaudhary
8. Nikki Pradhan
9. Bichu Devi Kharibam (GK)
10. Bansari Solanki (GK)
15. Mumtaz Khan
20. Lalremsiami
22. Baljeet Kaur
23. Ishika Sambharwal
24. Jyoti Rumavat
25. Navneet Kaur
27. Sushila Chanu Pukhrambam
29. Sunelita Toppo
30. Salima Tete (C)
32. Neha
35. Rutuja Pisal
37. Lalthantluangi
39. Sakshi Rana
40. Puja Sahoo
52. Beauty Dungdung
55. Deepika
Japan

Head Coach: (Japan) Akira Takahashi

4. Hanami Saito
7. Mayuri Horikawa
12. Niko Maruyama
13. Hiroka Murayama
18. Yu Kudo (C, GK)
19. Maho Ueno
20. Mei Matsunami
21. Rui Takashima
22. Ai Hiramitsu
24. Akane Wada
25. Haruka Kawaguchi
27. Nanami Kaneko
28. Rina Yamamoto
29. Kokona Tanaka
31. Kazuha Kageyama
33. Risa Sasaki
34. Hana Morikawa
35. Sayaka Kawamura (GK)
Malaysia

Head Coach: (India) C.R Kumar

2. Zati Muhamad
4. Siti Mohd
6. Zawiatul Hartomo
7. Azmyra Azhairy
9. Nurhanie Tarmizi
11. Nur Azhar
12. Nur Mazlan
14. Siti Shaikh
18. Nur Shamine Azureen
19. Insyirah Effarizal
20. Fitrinur Ramlee (GK)
21. Fatin Sukri
23. Dian Nazeri
25. Khairunnisa Mohd
26. Nuramirah Zulkifli
27. Nurmaizatul Syafi
29. Nur Ahmad
32. Nur Zainal (GK)
35. Noor Hasliza Ali (C)
36. Nur Ridzuan
South Korea

Head Coach: (South Korea) Kim Yong-soo

1. Lee Seo-yeon (GK)
2. Na Kyeong-min
3. Joo So-yeon
4. Hong Sol-beot-nara
5. Park Mi-gyeong
7. Lee Yu-ri (C)
9. Park Seung-ae
13. Mun Seung-hwa
17. Jin Su-yeon
18. Jeong Saena
19. Son Gayeong
20. Han Naryeong
21. Lee Ji-hae
22. Park Hyeon-jeong
23. Park Mi-hyang
24. Hong Youngeun
25. Park So-yeon
26. Son Hye-ryoung
27. Lee Young-eun
28. Kim Da-hae (GK)
Thailand

Head Coach: (South Korea) Young Wook Bae

1. Nantikarn Bunrit (GK)
4. Suwapat Konthong
5. Kunthida Khamsangwan
6. Marisa Al Mass
7. Kunjira Inpa
8. Sudarat Noo-Keaw
9. Arucha Komolwit
10. Jiratchaya Todkaew
11. Natthakarn Aunjai
13. Supansa Samanso (C)
14. Sawita Kakkaeo
15. Songkran Pasawat
17. Nadia Smeelen
17. Trinetr Jirapitsatja
18. Siraya Yimkrajang (GK)
19. Phimphakan Phakdeengam
25. Marisah Mock
33. Ariya Mock

== Round-robin ==
All times are local (UTC+5:30)

Pos	Team	Pld	W	D	L	GF	GA	GD	Pts	Qualification
1	India (H, Q)	3	3	0	0	13	2	+11	9	Semi-finals
2	Japan (Q)	3	3	0	0	7	1	+6	9	Semi-finals
3	China	3	1	1	1	10	5	+5	4	Semi-finals
4	Malaysia	3	1	1	1	6	7	−1	4	Semi-finals
5	South Korea	3	0	0	3	2	6	−4	0	Fifth place match
6	Thailand	3	0	0	3	0	17	−17	0	Fifth place match

Updated to match(es) played on 22 November 2026. Source: FIH
Rules for classification: 1) points; 2) matches won; 3) goal difference; 4) goals for; 5) head-to-head result; 6) field goals for.
(H) Hosts; (Q) Qualified for the phase indicated

19 November 2026
12:05

China	7–0	Thailand
Feng. Q 27', 32'; Deng 28', 42'; Wei 33'; Chen. Y 38'; Zhang. H 56'	Report

Barkheda Nathu International Sports Complex
Umpires:
Allison Mikelson (USA)
Sonali Singh (IND)

19 November 2026
14:20

Japan	1–0	South Korea
Saito 59'	Report

Barkheda Nathu International Sports Complex
Umpires:
Li Lulu (CHN)
Shivani Sharma (IND)

19 November 2026
16:35

India	4–1	Malaysia
Mumtaz 20'; Tete 35'; Puja 39'; Lalremsiami 49'	Report	Zulkifli 19'

Barkheda Nathu International Sports Complex
Umpires:
Minami Inamoto (JPN)
Fatma Mahmoud (EGY)

21 November 2026
14:30

China	2–2	Malaysia
Wei 35'; Feng. J 41'	Report	Siti 31'; Azhairy 45'

Barkheda Nathu International Sports Complex
Umpires:
Jang Hee-sun (KOR)
Wassana Pankemthong (THA)

21 November 2026
16:45

Thailand	0–3	Japan
	Report	Sasaki 9', 23'; Yamamoto 41'

Barkheda Nathu International Sports Complex
Umpires:
Deepa (IND)
Fatma Mahmoud (EGY)

21 November 2026
19:00

India	2–1	South Korea
Mumtaz 30'; Toppo 34'	Report	Hong 56'

Barkheda Nathu International Sports Complex
Umpires:
Allison Mikelson (USA)
Shahiela Johari (MAS)

22 November 2026
12:45

Japan	3–1	China
Yamamoto 19'; Kaneko 35'; Maruyama 60'	Report	Cai 45'

Barkheda Nathu International Sports Complex
Umpires:
Shahiela Johari (MAS)
Shivani Sharma (IND)

22 November 2026
15:00

South Korea	1–3	Malaysia
Mun 36'	Report	Syafi 33'; Zulkifli 38'; Siti 60'

Barkheda Nathu International Sports Complex
Umpires:
Minami Inamoto (JPN)
Deepa (IND)

22 November 2026
17:15

Thailand	0–7	India
	Report	Navneet 4', 56'; Deepika 10', 11', 56'; Mumtaz 28'; Toppo 32'

Barkheda Nathu International Sports Complex
Umpires:
Li Lulu (CHN)
Jang Hee-sun (KOR)

24 November 2026
14:30

South Korea	v	Thailand

Barkheda Nathu International Sports Complex

24 November 2026
16:45

Malaysia	v	Japan

Barkheda Nathu International Sports Complex

24 November 2026
19:00

India	v	China

Barkheda Nathu International Sports Complex

25 November 2026
14:30

Malaysia	v	Thailand

Barkheda Nathu International Sports Complex

25 November 2026
16:45

China	v	South Korea

Barkheda Nathu International Sports Complex

25 November 2026
19:00

Japan	v	India

Barkheda Nathu International Sports Complex

== Fifth place match ==
27 November 2026
14:00

5th RR	v	6th RR

Barkheda Nathu International Sports Complex

== Medal round ==
=== Bracket ===
Semi-finals
27 November
1st RR
4th RR
27 November
2nd RR
3rd RR

Gold medal match
28 November
Winner SF1
Winner SF2
Bronze medal match
28 November
Loser SF1
Loser SF2

=== Semi-finals ===
27 November 2026
16:30

1st RR	SF1	4th RR

Barkheda Nathu International Sports Complex

27 November 2026
19:00

2nd RR	SF2	3rd RR

Barkheda Nathu International Sports Complex

=== Bronze medal match ===
28 November 2026
16:30

Loser SF1	v	Loser SF2

Barkheda Nathu International Sports Complex

=== Gold medal match ===
28 November 2026
19:00

Winner SF1	v	Winner SF2

Barkheda Nathu International Sports Complex

== Statistics ==
=== Goalscorers ===
There have been 38 goals scored in 9 matches, for an average of 4.22 goals per match (as of 22 November 2026).

3 goals

- (India) Deepika
- (India) Mumtaz Khan

2 goals

- (China) Deng Qiuchan
- (China) Feng Qingmiao
- (China) Wei Qixiao
- (India) Navneet Kaur
- (India) Sunelita Toppo
- (Japan) Risa Sasaki
- (Japan) Rina Yamamoto
- (Malaysia) Siti Mohd
- (Malaysia) Nuramirah Zulkifli

1 goal

- (China) Cai Wenqian
- (China) Chen Yujun
- (China) Feng Jiaxin
- (China) Zhang Heyang
- (India) Lalremsiami
- (India) Puja Sahoo
- (India) Salima Tete
- (Japan) Nanami Kaneko
- (Japan) Niko Maruyama
- (Japan) Hanami Saito
- (Malaysia) Azmyra Azhairy
- (Malaysia) Nurmaizatul Syafi
- (South Korea) Hong Youngeun
- (South Korea) Mun Seung-hwa

Source: FIH

== See also ==
- 2026 Men's Asian Champions Trophy
