= 2019 Senior National Hockey Championship =

Senior National Hockey Championship 2019
Tournament details
- Dates: 7 January – 7 February
- Administrator(s): Hockey India
- Format(s): Single round-robin and Knock-out
- Host(s): Gwalior, Chennai
- Venue(s): 2

2019 edition of Senior National Hockey Championship (Men) is the 9th edition of Senior National tournament. Divided into two division's namely Division A and Division B. Division A matches scheduled from 31 January to 7 February 2019 in Gwalior, while Division B matches scheduled from 7 to 20 January 2019 in Chennai.

== Teams (A Division) ==
=== Pool A ===
- Hockey Bhopal
- Kerala Hockey
- Vidarbha Hockey Association

=== Pool B ===
- Chhattisgarh Hockey
- Hockey Madhya Bharat
- Assam Hockey

=== Pool C ===
- Hockey Coorg
- Namdhari XI
- Sports Authority of Gujarat - Hockey Academy

=== Pool D ===
- Andhra Hockey Association
- Hockey Puducherry
- Hockey Madhya Pradesh

=== Pool E ===
- Punjab National Bank
- Telangana Hockey
- Hockey Jammu & Kashmir

=== Pool F ===
- Bengal Hockey Association
- Hockey Andhra Pradesh
- Hockey Gujarat

=== Pool G ===
- Bengaluru Hockey Association
- Hockey Uttarakhand
- Goans Hockey

=== Pool H ===
- Hockey Rajasthan
- Hockey HIM
- Hockey Patiala
- Hockey Nagaland
