= Vidarbha Hockey Association Stadium =

Field hockey stadium in Nagpur, India

- VHA Stadium
- Full name: Vidarbha Hockey Association Stadium
- Location: Nagpur, Vidarbha
- Owner: Vidarbha Hockey Association
- Operator: Vidarbha Hockey Association
- Capacity: 5,000

Tenants
- India men's national field hockey team Vidarbha Hockey Team

Website
- Hockey India

Vidarbha Hockey Association Stadium is a field hockey stadium in Nagpur, Vidarbha. The stadium was constructed and maintained by Vidarbha Hockey Association and also has Vidarbha Hockey Academy. The stadium is mainly used for field hockey and has synthetic AstroTurf.
