= Yūdai Furukawa =

Japanese baseball player (born 1998)

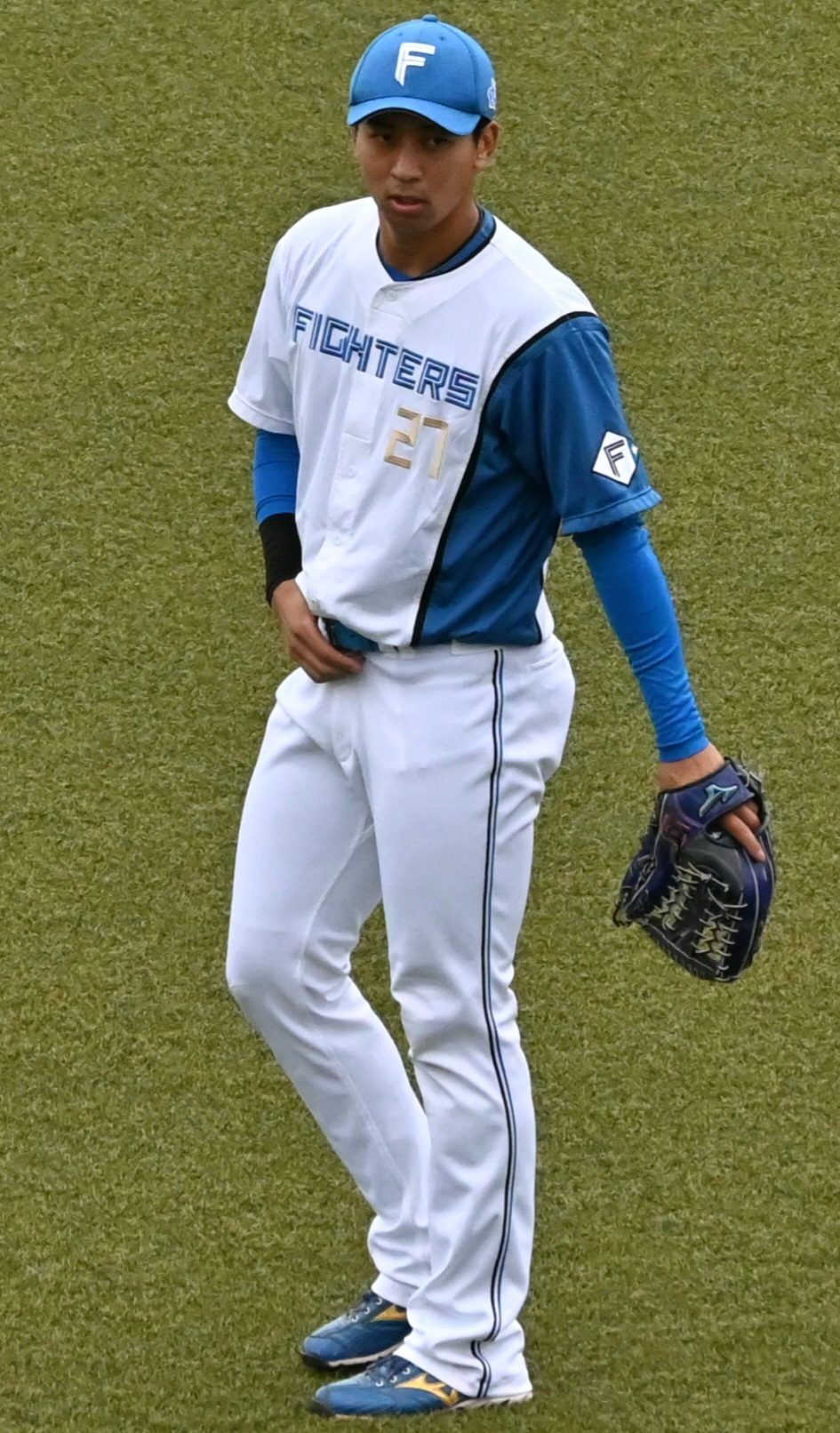
- Catcher
- Born: June 19, 1998 (age 27); Yame, Fukuoka, Japan
- Batted: Left Threw: Right

debut
- April 9, 2022, for the Hokkaido Nippon-Ham Fighters

Last appearance
- September 20, 2024, for the Hokkaido Nippon-Ham Fighters

NPB statistics (through 2025 season)
- Batting average: .213
- Hits: 30
- Home runs: 0
- Runs batted in: 5
- Stolen base: 0
- Stats at Baseball Reference

Teams
- Hokkaido Nippon-Ham Fighters (2022–2025)

Yūdai Furukawa (古川 裕大, Furukawa Yūdai; born June 19, 1998) is a professional Japanese baseball player. He plays catcher for the Hokkaido Nippon-Ham Fighters.
