= Hockey Asian Champions Trophy =

Hockey Asian Champions Trophy may refer to:

- Men's Asian Champions Trophy
- Women's Asian Champions Trophy
