= India men's national under-18 hockey5's team =

Hockey5s team that represents India

India hockey5s U18 boys
- Association: Hockey India
- Confederation: AHF (Asia)
- Head Coach: (India) Sardar Singh
- Captain: Ketan Kushwaha
- Top scorer: Vivek Prasad (24)

First international
- India 25–0 Thailand (Bangkok, 25 April 2018)

Last international
- India 3–1 Pakistan (Muscat, 25 July 2026)

Biggest win
- India 25–0 Thailand (Bangkok, 25 April 2018)

Youth Olympic Games
- Appearances: 1 (first in 2018)
- Best result: Runner-up (2018)

Youth Asia Cup
- Appearances: 1 (first in 2026)
- Best result: (gold) Champions (2026)
Medal record
Youth Olympics
Silver medal – second place	2018 Buenos Aires
Youth Asia Cup
Gold medal – first place	2026 Muscat

The India men's national under-18 hockey5s team represents India at international youth hockey5s tournaments and is governed by the Hockey India. India are the reigning Youth Olympic silver medallists and the Youth Asian champions.

== History ==
India qualified for the 2018 Summer Youth Olympics by winning the boys' Asian Youth Olympic Games Qualifier, a Hockey5s tournament held in Bangkok. India made its first appearance in the 2018 Youth Olympics, which was played in the Hockey 5s format, a 5-a-side tournament that is played on a smaller field size. India entered the final after defeating Argentina in the semi-final. They bagged silver as they lost to Malaysia in the final. It is the first hockey medal for India in Youth Olympics, along with the girls' team's silver in the same edition.

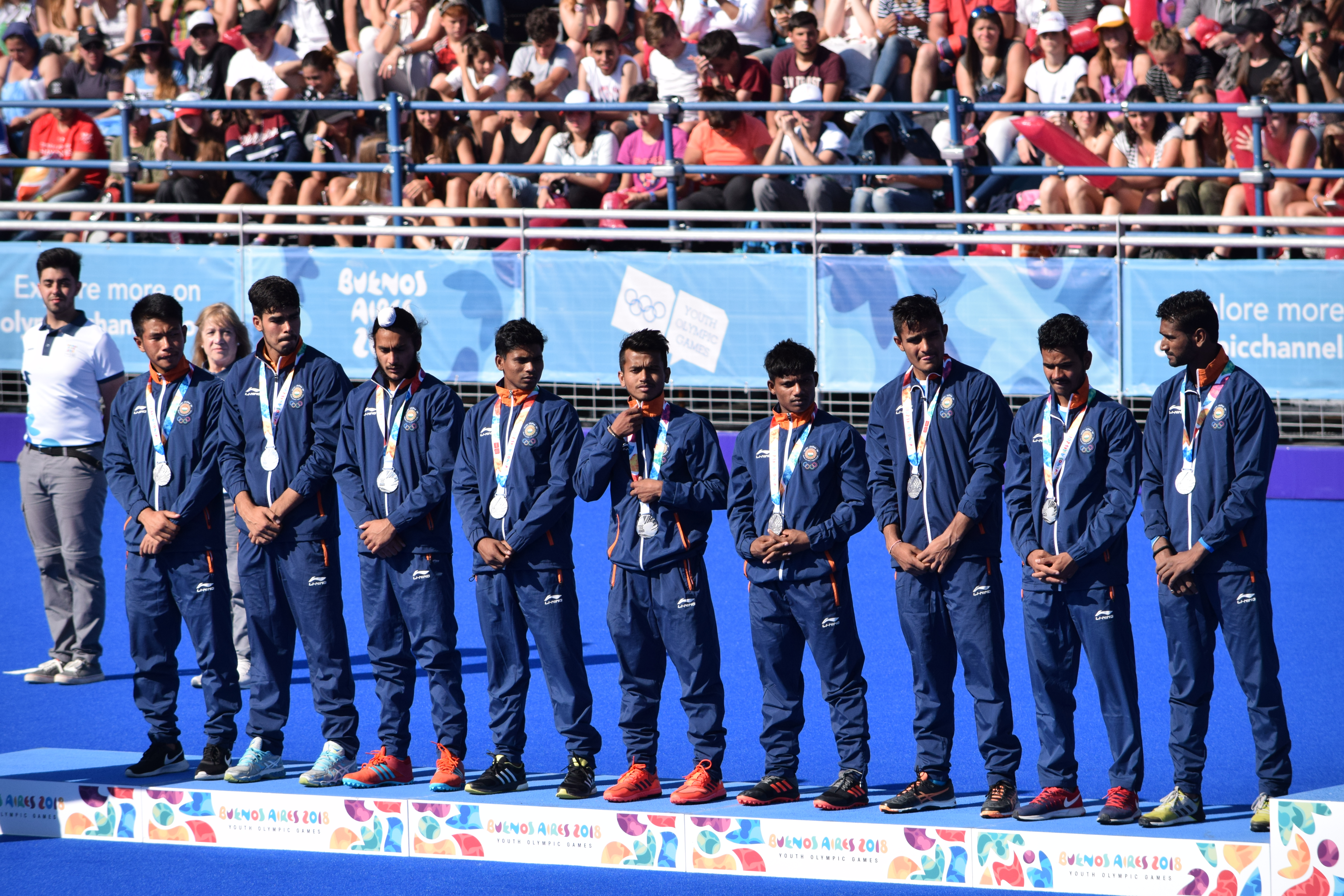
India's men's Hockey5s team at the medal ceremony after winning silver at the 2018 Summer Youth Olympics.

The team won the inaugural Asia Cup in Muscat, beating Pakistan thrice in the tournament, including the final, and qualified to the inaugural U18 World Cup.

=== U16 side ===
The qualification tournament for the 2014 Youth Olympics in hockey5s format took place in Singapore in 2013. Indian U16 team did not participate and missed the Youth Olympics.

== Tournament record ==
=== Summer Youth Olympics ===
Summer Youth Olympics
Year	Host	Round	Position	Pld	W	D	L	GF	GA
2014	Nanjing, China	Did not participate							
2018	Buenos Aires, Argentina	Final	2nd place, silver medalist(s)	8	6	0	2	43	15
	Total		Runners-up	8	6	0	2	43	15

=== Summer Youth Olympics Qualifiers ===
Summer Youth Olympics Qualifiers
Year	Host	Position	Result	Pld	W	D	L	GF	GA
2013	Singapore	Did not participate							
2018	Bangkok, Thailand	1st	Qualified for 2018 Youth Olympics	6	5	1	0	77	13
	Total		1 Title	6	5	1	0	77	13

=== Youth Hockey5s World Cup ===
U18 Hockey5's World Cup
Year	Host	Round	Position	Pld	W	D	L	GF	GA
2026	Cairo, Egypt	Qualified							
	Total								

=== Youth Hockey5s Asia Cup ===
U18 Hockey5's Asia Cup
Year	Host	Round	Position	Pld	W	D	L	GF	GA
2026	Muscat, Oman	Final	1st place, gold medalist(s)	7	7	0	0	56	15
	Total		1 Title	7	7	0	0	56	15

== Honours ==
=== Major tournaments ===
- Youth Olympics:
  - (silver) Silver medal: 2018
- Youth Asia Cup:
  - (gold) Champions: 2026

== Current squad ==
The following Indian team named for the 2026 U18 Hockey5's Asia Cup, that was held in Muscat, from 20 to 25 July 2026

Head coach: (India) Sardar Singh

Players, caps and goals updated as of 25 July 2026.

No.	Pos.	Player	Date of birth (age)	Caps	Goals	Club
54	GK	Ayush Rajak	4 August 2010 (age 16)	4		
16	GK	Sawan kumar	4 September 2010 (age 16)	7		
17	DF	Ashish Tani Purti	24 January 2011 (age 15)	7	3	
1	DF	Karan Gautam	2 November 2010 (age 16)	7	8	
5	MF	Rahul Yadav	16 December 2012 (age 13)	7	6	
18	DF	Romit Pal	4 June 2011 (age 15)	7	7	
11	FW	Ketan Kushwaha (Captain)	11 December 2011 (age 14)	7	18	
8	FW	Prahalad Rajbhar	3 August 2010 (age 16)	7	7	
7	FW	Arshdip singh	10 January 2010 (age 16)	6		
9	FW	Shahrukh Ali	25 May 2010 (age 16)	7	7	

== Individual records ==
=== Top goal scorers ===
Position	Player	Goals	Caps
1	Vivek Prasad	24	14
2	Rahul Kumar Rajbhar	19	14
3	Ketan Kushwaha	18	7
4	Anand Shivam	16	14
5	Mohammad Alishan	14	6

=== Most goals for India at Youth Olympics ===
Position	Player	Goals
1	Sudeep Chirmako	11
2	Anand Shivam	8
2	Vivek Prasad	8
4	Sanjay	6
5	Rahul Kumar Rajbhar	4
5	Rabichandra Singh Moirangthem	4

== Results and fixtures ==
The following is a list of match results in the last 12 months, as well as any future matches that have been scheduled.

Win Draw Loss Fixture

=== 2026 ===
All times are local (UTC+5:30).

20 July 2026 Hockey5s Asia Cup Elite	India	7–3	Bangladesh	Muscat, Oman
20:00	Rahul 2'; Gautam 4'; Kushwaha 8', 14'; Pal 10', 15'; Rajbhar 16'	Report	Nure 2'; Rahman 5'; Islam 14'	Stadium: Hockey Oman

21 July 2026 Hockey5s Asia Cup Elite	India	14–0	Oman	Muscat, Oman
18:30	Purti 1', 16', 19'; Rahul 2', 12'; S. Ali 3', 13'; Kushwaha 6', 11', 15', 20'; Rajbhar 9'; Gautam 15'; Pal 18'	Report		Stadium: Hockey Oman

21 July 2026 Hockey5s Asia Cup Elite	Pakistan	4–7	India	Muscat, Oman
21:30	Aslam 6'; Adeel 8'; Usman 10', 16'	Report	Rahul 3'; Gautam 5', 9', 19'; Rajbhar 10'; Pal 11'; Kushwaha 11'	Stadium: Hockey Oman

23 July 2026 Hockey5s Asia Cup Elite	Bangladesh	3–8	India	Muscat, Oman
20:00	Hosen 6'; Soton 8', 11'	Report	S. Ali 3'; Kushwaha 4', 8', 12', 15'; Pal 13'; Rajbhar 14'; Rahul 18'	Stadium: Hockey Oman

24 July 2026 Hockey5s Asia Cup Elite	Oman	1–10	India	Muscat, Oman
18:00	Al-Mashrafi 20'	Report	Gautam 2', 15'; S. Ali 3', 10'; Rajbhar 3', 16'; Kushwaha 6', 8', 11', 19'	Stadium: Hockey Oman

24 July 2026 Hockey5s Asia Cup Elite	India	7–3	Pakistan	Muscat, Oman
21:00	Pal 8'; Kushwaha 10', 20+'; Gautam 10'; Rajbhar 12'; S. Ali 16'; Rahul 18'	Report	Usman 15'; Adeel 17', 19'	Stadium: Hockey Oman

26 July 2026 Hockey5s Asia Cup Final	India	3–1	Pakistan	Muscat, Oman
00:10	Pal 5'; Kushwaha 12'; S. Ali 13'	Report	Usman 16'	Stadium: Hockey Oman

== Head-to-head record ==
Won more matches than lost
All matches drawn
Won equal matches to lost
Lost more matches than won

=== Overall record ===
Record last updated as of the following match:

India vs Pakistan at Hockey Oman, Muscat in the 2026 Men's U18 Hockey5's Asia Cup, 25 July 2026

Opponent	GP	W	D	L	GF	GA	Win %	Last meeting
Argentina	1	1	0	0	3	1	100%	2018
Australia	1	0	0	1	3	4	0%	2018
Austria	1	1	0	0	9	1	100%	2018
Bangladesh	4	4	0	0	34	8	100%	2026
Canada	1	1	0	0	5	2	100%	2018
Hong Kong	1	1	0	0	21	0	100%	2018
Japan	1	1	0	0	6	2	100%	2018
Kenya	1	1	0	0	7	1	100%	2018
Malaysia	2	0	1	1	6	8	0%	2018
Oman	2	2	0	0	24	1	100%	2026
Pakistan	3	3	0	0	17	8	100%	2026
Poland	1	1	0	0	4	2	100%	2018
South Korea	1	1	0	0	12	5	100%	2018
Thailand	1	1	0	0	25	0	100%	2018
Total	21	18	1	2	176	43	85.71%	2026

=== India Pakistan rivalry ===
India lead the head-to-head record against Pakistan, with 3 wins from 3 matches.

The following table shows India vs Pakistan in major tournaments :

Tournament	Year	Venue	Winning team, result
Under-18 Asia Cup	2026	(Oman) Muscat	India, 7–4
Under-18 Asia Cup	2026	(Oman) Muscat	India, 7–3
Under-18 Asia Cup	2026	(Oman) Muscat	India, 3–1

== See also ==
Indian national hockey teams
Men's					Women's				
Senior	Under-21	Under-18	Senior Hockey5s	Under-18 hockey5s	Senior	Under-21	Under-18	Senior Hockey5s	Under-18 hockey5s

- Field hockey in India
- India national para hockey team
