= 1989 Women's Intercontinental Cup =

Field hockey tournament in India

Tournament details
- Host country: India
- City: New Delhi
- Teams: 12

Final positions
- Champions: South Korea
- Runner-up: China
- Third place: Spain

The 1989 Women's Intercontinental Cup was a third edition of the FIH Women's Intercontinental Cup and served as a qualifier for the 1994 Women's Hockey World Cup. This tournament was held at the Major Dhyan Chand National Stadium in New Delhi, India from 1 until 12 November 1989. Twelve nations took part, and they were divided into two groups of six in the preliminary round. The top two teams from each group advanced to the semifinals. The third and fourth-placed teams went to the 5th-8th placement semifinals, and the fifth and sixth-placed teams went to the 9th-12th.

The top four teams qualified for the 1990 Women's Hockey World Cup.

== Squad ==
- China

Players: Chen Mingzhu, Qi Wen, Cai Donghong, Yang Huiping, Wu Yanzhen, Hong Ping Ding (GK)

- Ireland

Coach: George Tracy
Players: Glenda McKee, Mary Barnwell, Fiona Breheny (GK), Susie Kinley, Caroline Fusco, Jackie Burns, Mary Logue, Fiona Manning

- Scotland

Coach: Bill Joss
Players: Catherine Stirling, Pauline Lyon, Gillian Messenger, Moira MacLeod (Captain), Alison Ramsay, Caroline Howard, Susan Fraser, Sue Lawrie (GK), Wendy Fraser

- South Korea

Head coach: Park Young Jo
Players: Lim Gae Sook, Hea Sook Yang

- The United States

Head coach: (Netherlands) Boudewijn Castelijn
Assistant coach: Cheryl Murtagh
Players: Diane Madl, Deb Bricked, Lori Bruney, Pam Austin, Sandi Costigan, Tracey Fuchs, Tracey Griesbaum, Sheryl Johnson (Vice-captain), Donna Lee, Diane Loosbrock, Barbara Marois (Captain), Marcia Pankratz (Vice-captain), Janet Ryan, Patty Shea, Elizabeth Tchou, Mary Koboldt Tracey

== Preliminary round ==
=== Group A ===
Pos	Team	Pld	W	D	L	GF	GA	GD	Pts	Qualification
1	South Korea	5	5	0	0	33	3	+30	10	Semi-finals
2	China	5	3	1	1	11	8	+3	7	Semi-finals
3	Ireland	5	2	2	1	10	8	+2	6	
4	Scotland	5	1	2	2	6	10	−4	4	
5	Italy	5	0	2	3	1	11	−10	2	
6	France	5	0	1	4	3	24	−21	1	

Rules for classification: 1) points; 2) goal difference; 3) goals scored; 4) head-to-head result.

1 November 1989

France	0 - 2	China

1 November 1989

Ireland	1 - 0	Italy

2 November 1989

South Korea	5 - 0	Scotland

Shivaji Hockey Stadium

2 November 1989

China	2 - 2	Ireland
		Glenda McKee, Mary Barnwell

3 November 1989

South Korea	12 - 1	France

3 November 1989

Italy	0 - 0	Scotland

4 November 1989

France	0 - 0	Italy

5 November 1989

South Korea	4 - 1	Ireland

5 November 1989

China	3 - 0	Scotland

6 November 1989

Ireland	5 - 1	France
Mary Barnwell (2), Susie Kinley, Glenda McKee (2)

6 November 1989

China	4 - 0	Italy

7 November 1989

Scotland	5 - 1	France
Moira MacLeod (2), Alison Ramsay, Caroline Howard, Susan Fraser

7 November 1989

South Korea	6 - 1	Italy

8 November 1989

Ireland	1 - 1	Scotland
Susie Kinley		Wendy Fraser

8 November 1989

South Korea	6 - 0	China

=== Group B ===
Pos	Team	Pld	W	D	L	GF	GA	GD	Pts	Qualification
1	Spain	5	4	1	0	20	3	+17	9	Semi-finals
2	Japan	5	4	1	0	15	3	+12	9	Semi-finals
3	United States	5	3	0	2	11	6	+5	6	
4	India	5	2	0	3	15	9	+6	4	
5	Austria	5	0	1	4	5	21	−16	1	
6	Malaysia	5	0	1	4	2	26	−24	1	

Rules for classification: 1) points; 2) goal difference; 3) goals scored; 4) head-to-head result.

1 November 1989

Austria	1 - 1	Malaysia
Regina Lorenz		Christina Chin

1 November 1989

Japan	2 - 0	India

2 November 1989

United States	0 - 3	Spain

2 November 1989

India	4 - 0	Austria

3 November 1989

United States	0 - 1	Japan

3 November 1989

Spain	8 - 0	Malaysia

4 November 1989

Japan	5 - 0	Malaysia

5 November 1989

Spain	2 - 1	India

5 November 1989

United States	4 - 1	Austria

6 November 1989

Japan	6 - 2	Austria

6 November 1989

India	9 - 1	Malaysia

7 November 1989

Spain	1 - 1	Japan

7 November 1989

United States	3 - 0	Malaysia
Barbara Morois, Marcia Pankratz, Mary Koboldt

8 November 1989

Austria	1 - 6	Spain

8 November 1989

United States	4 - 1	India
Tracey Griesbaum (2), Marcia Pankratz, Barb Marois

== Final round ==
=== Semifinals ===
- 9th - 12th placement

9 or 10 November 1989

Italy	3 - 0	Malaysia

9 or 10 November 1989

France	1 - 0	Austria

- 5th - 8th placement

10 November 1989

Ireland	2 - 0	India
Mary Logue, Jackie Burns

10 November 1989

United States	3 - 1	Scotland
		Gillian Messenger

- 1st - 4th placement

10 November 1989

China	3 - 2	Spain
Yang Huiping (2), Chen Mingzhu

10 November 1989

South Korea	4 - 0	Japan

=== Finals ===
- 11th place match

10 or 11 November 1989

Malaysia	1 - 2	Austria

- 9th place match

10 or 11 November 1989

France	2 - 1	Italy

- 7th place match

11 November 1989

Scotland	3 - 2	India
Moira MacLeod (2), Wendy Fraser

- 5th place match

11 November 1989

United States	4 - 1	Ireland

- Third-place match

12 November 1989

Spain	4 - 0	Japan

Lim Gae Sook is a top scorer with 12 goals before the final.

- Final match

12 November 1989

South Korea	2 - 1	China
Gae Sook Lim, Hea Sook Yang		Qi Wen

Shivaji Hockey Stadium

== Final standings ==
1. South Korea*
2. China*
3. Spain*
4. Japan*
5. United States
6. Ireland
7. Scotland
8. India
9. France
10. Italy
11. Australia
12. Malaysia
