= 2026 Men's U18 Hockey5's Asia Cup =

Asian field hockey tournament

Tournament details
- Host country: Oman
- City: Muscat
- Dates: 20–25 July
- Teams: 7 (from 1 confederation)
- Venue: Hockey Oman

Final positions
- Champions: India (1st title)
- Runner-up: Pakistan
- Third place: Iran

Tournament statistics
- Matches played: 23
- Goals scored: 166 (7.22 per match)
- Top scorer: (India) Ketan Kushwaha (18 goals)
- Best player: (Pakistan) Adeel
- Best young player: (Bangladesh) Munna Islam
- Best goalkeeper: (India) Sawan Kumar

The 2026 Men's U18 Hockey5's Asia Cup was the first edition of the Men's U18 Hockey5's Asia Cup. A total of seven Asian national teams contested, organized by the Asian Hockey Federation. The tournament was held in Muscat, Oman from 20 to 25 July 2026. The tournament also served as an Asian qualifier for the inaugural 2026 Youth Hockey5s World Cup. India won the title after beating Pakistan in the final.

== Venue ==
(Oman) Muscat
Hockey Oman Stadium
Capacity: 5,500

== Teams ==
Bangladesh

Head Coach: (Bangladesh) Sheikh Nannu

1. Md Rahman(GK)
2. Munna Islam(C)
3. Sabbir Rahman
4. Md Islam
5. Md Rafsin(GK)
6. Akash Tuhin
7. Sohorab Soton
8. Nure
9. Md Hossain
10. Md Hosen
India

Head Coach: (India) Sardar Singh

1. Karan Gautam
5. Rahul Yadav
7. Arshdip Singh
8. Prahalad Rajbhar
9. Shahrukh Ali
11. Ketan Kushwaha(C)
16. Sawan Kumar(GK)
17. Ashish Tani Purti
18. Romit Pal
54. Ayush Rajak(GK)
Iran

Head Coach: (Iran) Mohammadali Malakahmadi

1. mohammadhosein salmanzade(GK)
2. alireza taghitash
3. parsa rajabi
4. mohammadtaha abbasi
5. mohammad pouya
7. mehdi golestan
8. mohammadnezhad kamyar
9. amirhossein rajabi
10. ashkan zolfagharkhanian(C)
12. amirfazel tebyanian(GK)
Iraq

Head Coach: (Iraq) Khald Alrisi

1. Mousalkadhim Hameed(GK)
4. Fadhil Issa
5. Sabit Hussein
6. Ibrahim Mustafa
7. Ghazi Mohammed
8. Yousif Ali(C)
9. Qaddoori Mahdi
10. Mohsin Dheyaa
11. Alialridha Hameed
22. Taresh Murtaja(GK)
Oman

Head Coach: (Oman) Mohammed Bait Jandal

2. Muatsim Bait
7. Hazaa Al Fori
8. Ayham Al Araimi
11. Alabbas Al Nofli
15. Said Al Fazari(C)
16. Badar Al Mujaini
22. Issa Al Raisi(GK)
26. Yousef Al Ghammari(GK)
28. Salim Raid Ahmed Marhoon Alrawahi
30. Khazraj Subait Subait Al-Mashrafi
Pakistan

Head Coach: (Pakistan) Rehan Butt

1. Ghulam Mustafa(GK)
2. Asam Haider
6. Hasan Akbar
9. Abdullah Awan
10. Salman Yasin
11. Adeel(C)
14. Muhammad Yahya Najeeb
19. Muhammad Usman
23. Muhammad Farhan Aslam
24. Noman(GK)
Saudi Arabia

Head Coach: (Saudi Arabia) Ahmed Mohamed Abdou Elgea

1. Moayad Dhahwah(GK)
5. Abdullah Al Yami
6. Abdulaziz AlRashed
7. Abdullah AlOtaibi(C)
8. Bader AlDashash
11. Abdullah AlAjmi
13. Abdulaziz Darraj
15. Abdulrahman AlAmmar
16. Rida Abuzinadah
22. Talal Nafea(GK)

Source:FIH

== Challenger group ==
Pos	Team	Pld	W	D	L	GF	GA	GD	Pts	Qualification
1	Iran	4	4	0	0	25	1	+24	12	Classification round
2	Iraq	4	1	1	2	7	12	−5	4	Classification round
3	Saudi Arabia	4	0	1	3	3	22	−19	1	Classification round

Source: FIH
Rules for classification: 1) points; 2) matches won; 3) goal difference; 4) goals for; 5) head-to-head result; 6) field goals for.

All times are local (UTC+4).

20 July 2026
19:00

Iran	5–0	Iraq
zolfagharkhanian 4', 18' rajabi 10', 13' abbasi 11'	Report

Umpires:
Hussain Al Hasani (OMA)
Nooh Al Hasani (OMA)

20 July 2026
21:00

Saudi Arabia	0–9	Iran
	Report	abbasi 4' rajabi 5', 7' mohammadnezhad 8', 20' pouya 9', 17', 19' zolfagharkhanian 14'

Umpires:
Qingmei Liu (CHN)
Mohamad Abbas Ekabi (IRI)

21 July 2026
19:30

Iraq	4–1	Saudi Arabia
Mustafa 1'; Hameed 5', 7'; Issa 13'	Report	AlDashash 12'

Umpires:
Mohammad Bagherpour (IRI)
Nooh Al Hasani (OMA)

23 July 2026
19:00

Iraq	1–4	Iran
Yousif 10'	Report	pouya 1' rajabi 4' golestan 7' mohammadnezhad 7'

Umpires:
Nooh Al Hasani (OMA)
Ammar Rana (CAM)

23 July 2026
21:00

Iran	7–0	Saudi Arabia
rajabi 4', 20' pouya 5' abbasi 10' zolfagharkhanian 11', 13' golestan 16'	Report

Umpires:
Nooh Al Hasani (OMA)
Nawar Al-Jabri (OMA)

24 July 2026
19:00

Saudi Arabia	2–2	Iraq
AlDashash 18', 20+'	Report	Hameed 5'; Mustafa 16'

Umpires:
Nooh Al Hasani (OMA)
Mahsa Ghandriz (IRI)

== Elite group ==
Pos	Team	Pld	W	D	L	GF	GA	GD	Pts	Qualification
1	India	6	6	0	0	53	14	+39	18	Gold medal match
2	Pakistan	6	3	1	2	26	21	+5	10	Gold medal match
3	Bangladesh	6	2	1	3	22	26	−4	7	Bronze medal match
4	Oman	6	0	0	6	8	48	−40	0	Classification round

Source: FIH
Rules for classification: 1) points; 2) matches won; 3) goal difference; 4) goals for; 5) head-to-head result; 6) field goals for.

All times are local (UTC+4).

20 July 2026
18:00

Oman	0–5	Pakistan
	Report	Usman 5', 18'; Adeel 6'; Najeeb 15'; Aslam 17'

Umpires:
Hari Silvarajoo (SGP)
Mohammad Ali Khan (BAN)

20 July 2026
20:00

India	7–3	Bangladesh
Rahul 2'; Gautam 4'; Kushwaha 8', 14'; Pal 10', 15'; Rajbhar 16'	Report	Nure 2'; Rahman 5'; Islam 14'

Umpires:
Hussain Al Hasani (OMA)
Qingmei Liu (CHN)

20 July 2026
21:30

Pakistan	5–2	Bangladesh
Usman 1'; Awan 5'; Aslam 5'; Adeel 11'; Haider 12'	Report	M. Islam 16'; Hosen 18'

Umpires:
Hari Silvarajoo (SGP)
Deekshith Narayana (IND)

21 July 2026
18:30

India	14–0	Oman
Purti 1', 16', 19'; Rahul 2', 12'; S. Ali 3', 13'; Kushwaha 6', 11', 15', 20'; Rajbhar 9'; Gautam 15'; Pal 18'	Report

Umpires:
Rahimah Abdul Aziz (SGP)
Qingmei Liu (CHN)

21 July 2026
20:30

Oman	3–4	Bangladesh
Al-Mashrafi 2'; Al Fazari 18', 19'	Report	Hosen 3'; Hossain 15'; Soton 19'; M. Islam 20'

Umpires:
Deekshith Narayana (IND)
Bhagyashree Agarwal (IND)

21 July 2026
21:30

Pakistan	4–7	India
Aslam 6'; Adeel 8'; Usman 10', 16'	Report	Rahul 3'; Gautam 5', 9', 19'; Rajbhar 10'; Pal 11'; Kushwaha 11'

Umpires:
Hari Silvarajoo (SGP)
Mohammad Ali Khan (BAN)

23 July 2026
18:00

Pakistan	7–3	Oman
Aslam 4', 5'; Adeel 7', 11', 12'; Usman 8'; Haider 19'	Report	Al Fazari 6', 9'; AlRawahi 13'

Umpires:
Deekshith Narayana (IND)
Mohammad Bagherpour (IRI)

23 July 2026
20:00

Bangladesh	3–8	India
Hosen 6'; Soton 8', 11'	Report	S. Ali 3'; Kushwaha 4', 8', 12', 15'; Pal 13'; Rajbhar 14'; Rahul 18'

Umpires:
Hussain Al Hasani (OMA)
Hari Silvarajoo (SGP)

23 July 2026
21:30

Bangladesh	2–2	Pakistan
Soton 9'; Hosen 10'	Report	Najeeb 4', 7'

Umpires:
Qingmei Liu (CHN)
Bhagyashree Agarwal (IND)

24 July 2026
18:00

Oman	1–10	India
Al-Mashrafi 20'	Report	Gautam 2', 15'; S. Ali 3', 10'; Rajbhar 3', 16'; Kushwaha 6', 8', 11', 19'

Umpires:
Hari Silvarajoo (SGP)
Ammar Rana (CAM)

24 July 2026
20:00

Bangladesh	8–1	Oman
M. Islam 2', 4', 5', 9', 12', 14', 16'; Soton 3'	Report	Al Mujaini 6'

Umpires:
Deekshith Narayana (IND)
Hari Silvarajoo (SGP)

24 July 2026
21:00

India	7–3	Pakistan
Pal 8'; Kushwaha 10', 20+'; Gautam 10'; Rajbhar 12'; S. Ali 16'; Rahul 18'	Report	Usman 15'; Adeel 17', 19'

Umpires:
Qingmei Liu (CHN)
Hussain Al Hasani (OMA)

== Classification round ==
24 July 2026
22:00

Iraq	2–2	Saudi Arabia
Yousif 13'; Mustafa 14'	Report	AlOtaibi 4'; Darraj 18'
Penalties
Yousif (penalty shoot-out missed); Issa (penalty shoot-out missed); Mohammad (penalty shoot-out scored)	1–0	(penalty shoot-out missed) AlDashash; (penalty shoot-out missed) AlAjmi; (penalty shoot-out missed) AlOtaibi

Umpires:
Mohammad Ali Khan (BAN)
Mohammad Bagherpour (IRI)

=== Men's Qualifier ===
25 July 2026
18:40

Oman	1–1	Iran
Al Fazari 14'	Report	abbasi 3'
Penalties
Al Mujaini (penalty shoot-out missed); Al Fazari (penalty shoot-out scored); Al Nofli (penalty shoot-out missed); Al Fazari (penalty shoot-out scored); Al Mujaini (penalty shoot-out scored); Al Nofli (penalty shoot-out missed)	3–4	(penalty shoot-out scored) pouya (penalty shoot-out missed) abbasi (penalty shoot-out missed) zolfagharkhanian (penalty shoot-out scored) pouya (penalty shoot-out scored) zolfagharkhanian (penalty shoot-out scored) abbasi

Umpires:
Deekshith Narayana (IND)
Qingmei Liu (CHN)

=== Challenger Trophy ===
25 July 2026
20:00

Oman	6–0	Iraq
Al Mujaini 1'; Al Fazari 2', 4'; Al Nofli 13'; Bait 15'; Al Araimi 16'	Report

Umpires:
Mohammad Ali Khan (BAN)
Deekshith Narayana (IND)

== Bronze medal match ==
25 July 2026
21:20

Bangladesh	2–4	Iran
Hosen 11'; M. Islam 16'	Report	zolfagharkhanian 1', 2', 12' taghitash 14'

Umpires:
Hari Silvarajoo (SGP)
Qingmei Liu (CHN)

== Gold medal match ==
25 July 2026
22:40

India	3–1	Pakistan
Pal 5'; Kushwaha 12'; S. Ali 13'	Report	Usman 16'

Umpires:
Mohammad Ali Khan (BAN)
Hari Silvarajoo (SGP)

== Winners ==
2026 Men's U18 Hockey5's Asia Cup
(India)
India
1st title

== Final standings ==
Pos	Team	
1st place, gold medalist(s)	India	Qualified to the U18 Youth Hockey5's World Cup
2nd place, silver medalist(s)	Pakistan	Qualified to the U18 Youth Hockey5's World Cup
3rd place, bronze medalist(s)	Iran	Qualified to the U18 Youth Hockey5's World Cup
4	Bangladesh	
5	Oman	
6	Iraq	
7	Saudi Arabia	

Source: FIH

== Goalscorers ==
There were 166 goals scored in 23 matches, for an average of 7.22 goals per match.

18 goals

- (India) Ketan Kushwaha

10 goals

- (Bangladesh) Munna Islam

8 goals

- (Pakistan) Adeel
- (India) Karan Gautam
- (Pakistan) Muhammad Usman
- (Iran) ashkan zolfagharkhanian

7 goals

- (Oman) Said Al Fazari
- (India) Shahrukh Ali
- (India) Romit Pal
- (India) Prahalad Rajbhar

6 goals

- (Iran) parsa rajabi
- (India) Rahul Yadav

5 goals

- (Pakistan) Muhammad Farhan Aslam
- (Bangladesh) Md Hosen
- (Iran) mohammad pouya
- (Bangladesh) Sohorab Soton

4 goals

- (Iran) mohammadtaha abbasi

3 goals

- (Saudi Arabia) Bader AlDashash
- (Iraq) Alialridha Hameed
- (Iran) kamyar mohammadnezhad
- (Iraq) Ibrahim Mustafa
- (Pakistan) Muhammad Yahya Najeeb
- (India) Ashish Tani Purti

2 goals

- (Oman) Badar Al Mujaini
- (Iran) mehdi golestan
- (Pakistan) Asam Haider
- (Oman) Khazraj Subait Subait Al-Mashrafi
- (Iraq) Ali Yousif

1 goal

- (Oman) Ayham Al Araimi
- (Oman) Alabbas Al Nofli
- (Saudi Arabia) Abdullah AlOtaibi
- (Pakistan) Abdullah Awan
- (Oman) Muatsim Bait
- (Saudi Arabia) Abdulaziz Darraj
- (Bangladesh) Md Hossain
- (Bangladesh) Md Islam
- (Iraq) Fadhil Issa
- (Bangladesh) Nure
- (Bangladesh) Sabbir Rahman
- (Iran) amirhossein rajabi
- (Oman) Salim Raid Ahmed Marhoon AlRawahi
- (Iran) alireza taghitash

Source: FIH

== See also ==
- 2026 Women's U18 Hockey5's Asia Cup
