= Hockey Asia Cup =

Hockey Asia Cup may refer to:

- Men's Hockey Asia Cup
- Women's Hockey Asia Cup
