= Barkheda Nathu =

- village
- Location within Madhya Pradesh Location within India
- Coordinates: 23.208809°N 77.325581°E
- Country: India
- State: Madhya Pradesh
- District: Bhopal
- Tehsil: Huzur

Population (2011)
  - Total: 2,324
- Time zone: UTC+5:30 (IST)
- ISO 3166 code: IN-MP
- Census code: 482509

Barkheda Nathu is a village in the Bhopal district of Madhya Pradesh, India. It is located in the Huzur tehsil.

In 2013, the Madhya Pradesh government identified 40 acres of land in Barkheda Nathu for the construction of an international cricket stadium, but as of 2015, the construction has not been started yet.

== Demographics ==
According to the 2011 census of India, Barkheda Nathu has 442 households. The effective literacy rate (i.e. the literacy rate of population excluding children aged 6 and below) is 71.93%.

Demographics (2011 Census)
	Total	Male	Female
Population	2324	1202	1122
Children aged below 6 years	347	178	169
Scheduled caste	448	230	218
Scheduled tribe	257	132	125
Literates	1422	830	592
Workers (all)	987	616	371
Main workers (total)	335	259	76
Main workers: Cultivators	121	111	10
Main workers: Agricultural labourers	87	43	44
Main workers: Household industry workers	22	19	3
Main workers: Other	105	86	19
Marginal workers (total)	652	357	295
Marginal workers: Cultivators	39	27	12
Marginal workers: Agricultural labourers	558	294	264
Marginal workers: Household industry workers	23	14	9
Marginal workers: Others	32	22	10
Non-workers	1337	586	751
