= FIH Hockey World Cup =

FIH Hockey World Cup may refer to:

- Men's FIH Hockey World Cup
- Women's FIH Hockey World Cup
