= Rizwana Yasmeen =

Pakistani field hockey player

Rizwana Yasmin
Personal information
- Born: 4 September 1990 (age 36) Gojra, Pakistan

Sport
- Sport: Field hockey
- Position: Goalkeeper
National team
Years	Team	Caps	Goals
2010–present	Pakistan	20	(0)
- Updated on 4 December 2023

Rizwana Yasmeen (born 4 September 1990) is a field hockey player from Pakistan. As of November 2020, she is the captain of the Pakistan women's national field hockey team.

== Career ==
Yasmeen began her career in 2006. Her playing position is goalkeeper.

=== National ===
At national competitions, Yasmeen represents WAPDA. At the National Women's Championships held in Islamabad in 2016, she was declared the tournament's best goalkeeper.

=== International ===
In 2006, Yasmeen was one of the standbys for the 2006 Asian Games Qualifiers held in Kuala Lumpur, Malaysia. In 2010, she was part of the team selected to compete at the 2010 Asian Games Qualifiers held in Bangkok, Thailand.

She participated in the 2nd Asian Hockey Challenge held in Bangkok, in September 2013, earning six caps.

In 2016, she was part of the team which reached the semi-finals of the 4th Women’s Asian Hockey Federation Cup which was held in Bangkok. This was the first time that the national team had reached the semi-finals of the tournament.

In 2017, Yasmeen was appointed the national team captain for the Asian Hockey Challenge held in Bandar Seri Begawan, Brunei. It was originally a six-nation tournament, but three teams pulled out before it started. Pakistan finished runners-up to Hong Kong, with Brunei finishing third.

Yasmeen led the national team at the 2018 Asian Games Qualifying Tournament in Bangkok, Thailand. There, the team lost five of their matches, winning one against seventh-placed Indonesia by a score of 3-0, their only goals in the tournament. The team placed sixth and did not qualify for the Games. Yasmeen played in four matches during the tournament, sitting out against Kazakhstan and Singapore.

Between 2013 and 2018, Yasmeen was capped 18 times, winning 4 games and drawing 2. As of 12 January 2018, she has earned 20 international caps.

==== Events participated in ====
1. Asian Games hockey qualifiers: 2018
2. Asian Hockey Federation (AHF) Cup: 2012, 2016
3. Asian Hockey Challenge: 2013, 2017
4. 30th Surjeet Sing Hockey Tournament 2014 Jalandhar, India
