= Field hockey at the 2022 Asian Games – Women's Qualifier =

2022 Women's Asian Games Qualifier
Tournament details
- Host country: Indonesia
- City: Jakarta
- Dates: 6–14 June
- Teams: 7 (from 1 confederation)
- Venue: Gelora Bung Karno Sports Complex

Final positions
- Champions: Hong Kong
- Runner-up: Kazakhstan
- Third place: Singapore

Tournament statistics
- Matches played: 21
- Goals scored: 98 (4.67 per match)
- Top scorer: (Hong Kong) Evelyn Cheung (7 goals)

The 2022 Women's Asian Games Qualifier was the qualification tournament for the women's field hockey event at the 2022 Asian Games. It was held from 6 to 14 June 2022 in Jakarta, Indonesia and the top six teams qualified for the 2022 Asian Games.

== Teams ==
- Hong Kong
- Kazakhstan
- Indonesia
- Cambodia
- Uzbekistan
- Sri Lanka
- Singapore

== Results ==
Pos	Team	Pld	W	D	L	GF	GA	GD	Pts	Qualification
1	Hong Kong	6	5	0	1	22	1	+21	15	2022 Asian Games
2	Kazakhstan	6	5	0	1	23	6	+17	15	2022 Asian Games
3	Singapore	6	4	1	1	19	2	+17	13	2022 Asian Games
4	Uzbekistan	6	3	0	3	14	11	+3	9	2022 Asian Games
5	Indonesia (H)	6	2	1	3	10	7	+3	7	
6	Sri Lanka	6	1	0	5	10	30	−20	3	
7	Cambodia	6	0	0	6	0	41	−41	0	

Source: FIH
Rules for classification: 1) points; 2) matches won; 3) goal difference; 4) goals for; 5) head-to-head result; 6) field goals for.
(H) Hosts

6 June 2022
16:00

Hong Kong	5–0	Cambodia
Cheung 10'; Yick 12'; Chuen 25'; Law 43', 45'	Report

Umpires:
Nur Hafizah Azman (MAS)
Tita Sari (INA)

6 June 2022
18:00

Kazakhstan	1–0	Indonesia
Lobanova 7'	Report

Umpires:
Ornpimol Kittiteerasopon (THA)
Minami Inamoto (JPN)

7 June 2022
14:00

Sri Lanka	5–0	Cambodia
Muthukuttige 31'; Kaluarachchige 43', 47'; Perera 48'; Hewa 60'	Report

Umpires:
Mok Moka (HKG)
Alizah Puteri (INA)

7 June 2022
16:00

Hong Kong	4–0	Uzbekistan
Cheung 6', 36', 57'; Lau 47'	Report

Umpires:
Ornpimol Kittiteerasopon (THA)
Rahimah Aziz (SGP)

7 June 2022
18:00

Singapore	0–0	Indonesia
	Report

Umpires:
Nur Hafizah Azman (MAS)
Assel Mukasheva (KAZ)

8 June 2022
16:00

Kazakhstan	2–0	Uzbekistan
Bolganbayeva 55'; Bissirova 56'	Report

Umpires:
Mok Moka (HKG)
Rahimah Aziz (SGP)

8 June 2022
18:00

Singapore	6–0	Sri Lanka
Ng 6'; Francis 8', 19'; Tan 35'; Chua 44'; Johana 48'	Report

Umpires:
Minami Inamoto (JPN)
Tita Sari (INA)

9 June 2022
14:00

Kazakhstan	9–0	Cambodia
Makhanova 2'; Lyapina 4', 18'; Bolganbayeva 15'; Berdenova 21'; Izbassarova 36', 55'; Lobanova 38'; Utigenova 52'	Report

Umpires:
Rahimah Aziz (SGP)
Tamila Amridinova (UZB)

9 June 2022
16:00

Hong Kong	6–0	Sri Lanka
Lau 3', 20'; Cheung 6', 32', 48'; Wong 13'	Report

Umpires:
Nur Hafizah Azman (MAS)
Minami Inamoto (JPN)

9 June 2022
18:00

Uzbekistan	2–1	Indonesia
Kakhramonova 33', 37'	Report	Anisa 59'

Umpires:
Ornpimol Kittiteerasopon (THA)
Assel Mukasheva (KAZ)

10 June 2022
16:00

Singapore	10–0	Cambodia
Sim 12', 40', 45'; Johana 14', 36', 44'; Ng 18', 48'; Ho 20', 37'	Report

Umpires:
Mok Moka (HKG)
Tamila Amridinova (UZB)

10 June 2022
18:00

Hong Kong	4–0	Kazakhstan
Law 19', 32'; Chuen 44'; Chan 54'	Report

Umpires:
Nur Hafizah Azman (MAS)
Ornpimol Kittiteerasopon (THA)

11 June 2022
16:00

Singapore	2–0	Uzbekistan
Ho 31'; Sim 47'	Report

Umpires:
Minami Inamoto (JPN)
Alizah Puteri (INA)

11 June 2022
18:00

Sri Lanka	1–5	Indonesia
Kumari 45+'	Report	Anisa 6', 7'; El Islamy 22'; Suwito 26'; Aulia 51'

Umpires:
Rahimah Aziz (SGP)
Mok Moka (HKG)

12 June 2022
16:00

Kazakhstan	9–2	Sri Lanka
Sabazova 10', 26'; Beisenbay 17', 37'; Lobanova 18'; Izbassarova 23', 58'; Makhanova 45'; Lyapina 47'	Report	Fernando 6'; Devadas 43'

Umpires:
Ornpimol Kittiteerasopon (THA)
Minami Inamoto (JPN)

12 June 2022
18:00

Hong Kong	3–0	Indonesia
Mountain 31'; Lau 47'; Lee 60'	Report

Umpires:
Nur Hafizah Azman (MAS)
Assel Mukasheva (KAZ)

13 June 2022
16:00

Cambodia	0–8	Uzbekistan
	Report	Kakhramonova 4', 37', 49'; Khasanboeva 6', 19', 25', 30', 33'

Umpires:
Mok Moka (HKG)
Tita Sari (INA)

13 June 2022
18:00

Singapore	1–0	Hong Kong
Sim 49'	Report

Umpires:
Ornpimol Kittiteerasopon (THA)
Tamila Amridinova (UZB)

14 June 2022
14:00

Sri Lanka	2–4	Uzbekistan
Hewa 23'; Devadas 54'	Report	Kakhramonova 5'; K. Adizova 11', 27'; Khasanboeva 15'

Umpires:
Mok Moka (HKG)
Alizah Puteri (INA)

14 June 2022
16:00

Singapore	0–2	Kazakhstan
	Report	Domashneva 15'; Izbassarova 20'

Umpires:
Ornpimol Kittiteerasopon (THA)
Nur Hafizah Azman (MAS)

14 June 2022
18:00

Cambodia	0–4	Indonesia
	Report	Anisa 19'; Melinda 39'; Ronsumbre 54'; Suwito 56'

Umpires:
Minami Inamoto (JPN)
Rahimah Aziz (SGP)

== See also ==
- Field hockey at the 2022 Asian Games – Men's Qualifier
