= Ambreen Arshad =

Pakistani field hockey player

Personal information
- Born: Bahawalpur, Pakistan

Sport
- Sport: Field hockey
- Position: Left in
National team
Years	Team	Caps	Goals
2012–present	Pakistan	28	(7)
- Updated on 4 December 2023

Ambreen Arshad , Bahawalpur) is a field hockey player representing Pakistan. Playing mainly as a left-in, she has been the vice-captain of the national team. As of January 2018, her record boasts 7 goals and 28 international caps.

== Career ==
=== National ===
At the national level, Arshad plays for WAPDA.

=== International ===
Arshad was a member of the team that placed 8th at the Junior Asia Cup held in Bangkok, Thailand in 2012. The team was placed in Pool B with Korea, Japan, Thailand, and Kazakhstan. She was part of the which came sixth at the 3rd Women's AHF Cup held in Singapore in 2012. She participated in the 2nd Asian Hockey Challenge held in Bangkok, Thailand in September 2013 during which she scored 2 goals and played in all 6 matches including the 3/4 playoff. Coming on in the 13th minute, she scored two field goals in a 4–0 win over Myanmar. Arshad participated in the 31st Surjit Singh Hockey Tournament held in Jalandhar, India in 2014.

At the 4th Women's AHF Cup held in Bangkok, Thailand in 2016, she was part of the team which qualified for the semi-finals, and eventually placed 4th. She played in five matches including the semi-finals and the 3/4 playoff. In the bronze medal match, she scored the only goal against Chinese Taipei in a 4–1 loss.

She was the vice-captain of the team which participated in the Women's Asia Challenge 2017, held in Bandar Seri Begawan, Brunei, starting in all six matches including the final. She was the joint top scorer for her team with 3 goals (2 field goals and 1 penalty stroke) all scored against Brunei. At the 2018 Asian Games qualifiers held in Bangkok, Thailand, Arshad was again the vice-captain and started all six games, scoring a solitary goal through a penalty corner against Indonesia. She also earned a yellow card in the 7–0 loss to Thailand.

International Goals
Event	Opponent	Goals	FG/PC/PS	Final Score
2nd Asian Hockey Challenge (2013)	Myanmar	2	2 x field goal (42, 58)	4-0 (win)
4th AHF Cup (2016)	Chinese Taipei (bronze medal)	1	1 x field goal (32)	1-4 (loss)
Women's Asia Challenge (2017)	Brunei	3	1 x penalty stroke (51)(match 3), 2 x field goal (28, 52) (match 6)	4-0 (win), 4-0 (win)
Asian Games qualifiers (2018)	Indonesia	1	1 x penalty scorer (pc) (29)	3-0 (win)
Total (as of January 2018)		7		
