= 1985 Men's Hockey Asia Cup =

Field hockey competition

Tournament details
- Host country: Bangladesh
- City: Dhaka
- Dates: 20–28 January
- Teams: 10 (from 1 confederation)

Final positions
- Champions: Pakistan (2nd title)
- Runner-up: India
- Third place: South Korea

Tournament statistics
- Matches played: 26
- Goals scored: 134 (5.15 per match)

The 1985 Men's Hockey Asia Cup was the second edition of the Men's Hockey Asia Cup, the quadrennial international men's field hockey championship of Asia organized by the Asian Hockey Federation. It was held in Dhaka, Bangladesh from 20 to 28 January 1985.

The defending champions Pakistan won its second Asian title by defeating India 3–2 in the final. The final was tied at 1–1 until the 83 minute, before Pakistan quickly scored 2 goals and India also netted one more for the eventual scoreline. South Korea won its first medal by defeating Japan 2–0 in the bronze medal match.

== Preliminary round ==
=== Group A ===
Pos	Team	Pld	W	D	L	GF	GA	GD	Pts	Qualification
1	Pakistan	4	4	0	0	21	0	+21	8	Semi-finals
2	Japan	4	2	1	1	13	4	+9	5	Semi-finals
3	Bangladesh (H)	4	1	2	1	6	5	+1	4	
4	China	4	1	1	2	5	5	0	3	
5	Iran	4	0	0	4	2	33	−31	0	

Source: todor66.com
(H) Hosts

Team 1	Score	Team 2
Pakistan	2–0	Japan
Bangladesh	2–2	China
Pakistan	16–0	Iran
Japan	1–1	Bangladesh
China	3–0	Iran
Pakistan	1–0	Bangladesh
Japan	11–1	Iran
Pakistan	2–0	China
Japan	1–0	China
Bangladesh	3–1	Iran

=== Group B ===
Pos	Team	Pld	W	D	L	GF	GA	GD	Pts	Qualification
1	India	4	4	0	0	22	1	+21	8	Semi-finals
2	South Korea	4	2	1	1	17	10	+7	5	Semi-finals
3	Malaysia	4	2	1	1	8	4	+4	5	
4	Sri Lanka	4	1	0	3	6	17	−11	2	
5	Singapore	4	0	0	4	3	24	−21	0	

Source: todor66.com

Team 1	Score	Team 2
India	8–1	South Korea
India	3–2	Malaysia
India	6–0	Sri Lanka
India	5–0	Singapore
South Korea	0–0	Malaysia
South Korea	7–0	Sri Lanka
South Korea	9–2	Singapore
Malaysia	3–1	Sri Lanka
Malaysia	5–0	Singapore
Sri Lanka	5–1	Singapore

== Classification round ==
=== Fifth to eighth place classification ===
==== Seventh place game ====
28 January 1985

China	2–0	Sri Lanka

==== Fifth place game ====
28 January 1985

Malaysia	5–0	Bangladesh

=== First to fourth place classification ===
Semi-finals
27 January
Pakistan	7
South Korea	0
27 January
India	9
Japan	1

Final
28 January
Pakistan	3
India	2
Third place
28 January
South Korea	2
Japan	0

==== Semi-finals ====
27 January 1985

Pakistan	7–0	South Korea
Ahmad 27'; Sardar 31', 33', 43', 52', 69'; H. Khan	Report

27 January 1985

India	9–1	Japan
Naim ?', 38', ?'; Sharma ?'; Rawat 21', ?', ?'; Shahid 29'	Report	Takamori 13'

==== Third place game ====
28 January 1985

South Korea	2–0	Japan

==== Final ====
28 January 1985

Pakistan	3–2 (a.e.t.)	India
H. Khan 34'; Ahmad 83'; K. Khan 87'	Report	Naim 57'; H. Singh 85'

== Winners ==
1985 Men's Hockey Asia Cup winners

Pakistan
Second title

== Final standings ==
1. Pakistan
2. India
3. South Korea
4. Japan
5. Malaysia
6. Bangladesh
7. China
8. Sri Lanka
9. Singapore
10. Iran
