= Field hockey at the 2022 Asian Games – Women's tournament =

Women's field hockey at the 2022 Asian Games
Tournament details
- Host country: China
- City: Hangzhou
- Dates: 25 September – 7 October 2023
- Teams: 10 (from 1 confederation)
- Venue: Gongshu Canal Sports Park Field Hockey Field

Final positions
- Champions: China (4th title)
- Runner-up: South Korea
- Third place: India

Tournament statistics
- Matches played: 27
- Goals scored: 173 (6.41 per match)
- Top scorer: (China) Gu Bingfeng (9 goals)

The women's field hockey tournament at the 2022 Asian Games was the 11th edition of the field hockey event for women at the Asian Games. It was held alongside the men's tournament at the Gongshu Canal Sports Park Field Hockey Field in Hangzhou, China from 25 September to 7 October 2023.

The hosts China won their fourth Asian Games title by defeating South Korea 2–0 in the final. India won the bronze medal after defeating the defending champions Japan 2–1. As winners China qualified directly for the 2024 Summer Olympics.

== Qualified teams ==
Qualification	Date	Host	Berths	Qualified team
Host country	16 September 2016	—N/a	1	China
2018 Asian Games	19–31 August 2018	(Indonesia) Jakarta	5	Japan; India; South Korea; Malaysia; Thailand
2022 Asian Games Qualifier	6–14 June 2022	(Indonesia) Jakarta	4	Hong Kong; Kazakhstan; Singapore; Indonesia
Total			10	

== Preliminary round ==
=== Pool A ===
Pos	Team	Pld	W	D	L	GF	GA	GD	Pts	Qualification
1	India	4	3	1	0	33	1	+32	10	Semi-finals
2	South Korea	4	3	1	0	17	1	+16	10	Semi-finals
3	Malaysia	4	2	0	2	16	12	+4	6	Fifth place game
4	Singapore	4	1	0	3	2	25	−23	3	Seventh place game
5	Hong Kong	4	0	0	4	0	29	−29	0	Ninth place game

Source: FIH
Rules for classification: 1) points; 2) matches won; 3) goal difference; 4) goals for; 5) head-to-head result; 6) field goals for.

25 September 2023
10:15

South Korea	4–0	Singapore
Kang 16'; Park 20'; Cho H. 34'; Pak 42'	Report

Umpires:
Annelize Rostron (RSA)
Jianjun Chen (CHN)

25 September 2023
12:45

Malaysia	8–0	Hong Kong
Sukri 10', 40'; Rashid 20'; Onn 21'; Husain 38'; Insyriah 56'; Azhar 60'; Saiuti 60'	Report

Umpires:
Cookie Tan (SGP)
Durga Devi (IND)

27 September 2023
12:45

India	13–0	Singapore
Udita 6'; Sushila 8'; Deepika 11'; Navneet 14', 14'; Grace 17'; Neha 19'; Sangita 23', 47', 53'; Salima 35'; Monika 52'; Vandana 56'	Report

Umpires:
Kittiteerasopon Ornpimol (THA)
Liu Xiaoying (CHN)

27 September 2023
16:00

South Korea	7–0	Hong Kong
Baek 14'; Cho E. 15+'; Kim J. 23', 53'; Choi 33'; Cheon 47', 59'	Report

Umpires:
Irene Presenqui (ARG)
Binish Hayat (PAK)

29 September 2023
16:00

Hong Kong	0–1	Singapore
	Report	S. Ng 3'

29 September 2023
18:30

Malaysia	0–6	India
	Report	Monika 7'; Grace 8'; Navneet 25'; Vaishnavi 15'; Sangita 24'; Lalremsiami 50'

Umpires:
Liu Xiaoying (CHN)
Tan Cookie (SGP)

1 October 2023
10:15

Singapore	1–8	Malaysia
S. Ng 34'	Report	Saiuti 9'; S. Mohd 15'; Rashid 29'; Syafi 31'; Azhar 37'; K. Mohd 48'; Onn 54', 59'

Umpires:
Chen Jianjun (CHN)
Tang Shi Him (HKG)

1 October 2023
16:00

South Korea	1–1	India
Cho H. 12'	Report	Navneet 44'

Umpires:
Xiaoying Liu (CHN)
Irene Presenqui (ARG)

3 October 2023
10:15

India	13–0	Hong Kong
Vandana 2', 48'; Deepika 4', 54', 58'; Monika 7'; Grace 11', 42'; Sangita 27', 55'; Vaishnavi 34'; Navneet 58'	Report

Umpires:
Ornpimol Kittiteerasopon (THA)
Binish Hayat (PAK)

3 October 2023
12:45

Malaysia	0–5	South Korea
	Report	Cho E. 14'; An S. 25', 38'; Seo 36'; Lee Y. 48'

Umpires:
Chieko Soma (JPN)
Sophie Bockelmann (GER)

=== Pool B ===
Pos	Team	Pld	W	D	L	GF	GA	GD	Pts	Qualification
1	Japan	4	4	0	0	31	0	+31	12	Semi-finals
2	China (H)	4	3	0	1	43	2	+41	9	Semi-finals
3	Thailand	4	2	0	2	7	26	−19	6	Fifth place game
4	Kazakhstan	4	1	0	3	2	24	−22	3	Seventh place game
5	Indonesia	4	0	0	4	1	32	−31	0	Ninth place game

Source: FIH
Rules for classification: 1) points; 2) matches won; 3) goal difference; 4) goals for; 5) head-to-head result; 6) field goals for.
(H) Hosts

25 September 2023
16:00

Thailand	4–0	Kazakhstan
Sanpoung 2', 25'; Samanso 43'; Inpa 58'	Report

Umpires:
Irene Presenqui (ARG)
Chieko Soma (JPN)

25 September 2023
18:30

China	20–0	Indonesia
Li H. 4'; Dan 4'; Chen Ya. 6', 38'; Gu 9', 24', 44', 56'; Zhang X. 10'; Huang 11'; Zhong 17', 18', 60'; Chen Yi 22'; Zhang Y. 29', 41', 58'; Ma 35'; Liang 42', 60'	Report

Umpires:
Yoon Seon Kim (KOR)
Ornpimol Kittiteerasopon (THA)

27 September 2023
10:15

Japan	7–0	Indonesia
Oikawa 2'; H. Nagai 15', 57'; Kobayakawa 17'; Hasegawa 40'; Kobayashi 51'; Y. Nagai 56'	Report

Umpires:
Annelize Rostron (RSA)
Tang Shi Him (HKG)

27 September 2023
18:30

China	11–0	Kazakhstan
Liang 16', 35', 53'; Zhong 18'; Gu 24', 52', 56'; Zhang Y. 25', 49'; Ma 33'; Huang 51'	Report

Umpires:
Kim Jung-Hee (KOR)
Sophie Bockelmann (GER)

29 September 2023
10:15

Kazakhstan	2–1	Indonesia
Domashneva 10'; Lobanova 41'	Report	Ronsumbre 29'

Umpires:
Kim Jung-Hee (KOR)
Chen Jianjun (CHN)

29 September 2023
12:45

Thailand	0–14	Japan
	Report	Toriyama 6'; Suzuki 10'; Oikawa 15'; Kobayashi 19', 54'; Kobayakawa 23', 30', 37', 50'; Fujibayashi 24'; Omoto 56'; Hasegawa 57', 57'; Y. Nagai 59'

Umpires:
Kim Yoon-Seon (KOR)
Devi Durga (IND)

1 October 2023
12:45

Indonesia	0–3	Thailand
	Report	Noo-Keaw 12'; Konthong 40'; Aunjai 53'

Umpires:
Sophie Bockelmann (GER)
Binish Hayat (PAK)

1 October 2023
18:30

China	0–2	Japan
	Report	Oikawa 26'; Asai 36'

Umpires:
Annelize Rostron (RSA)
Cookie Tan (SGP)

3 October 2023
16:00

Japan	8–0	Kazakhstan
Toriyama 4', 36'; H. Nagai 6'; Y. Nagai 28', 51'; Hasegawa 37', 39'; Kobayashi 50'	Report

Umpires:
Yoon Seon Kim (KOR)
Shi Him Tang (HKG)

3 October 2023
18:30

Thailand	0–12	China
	Report	Zhong 9', 33'; Huang 14', 59'; Zhang Y. 22', 40'; Zhang X. 27'; Chen Yi 45'; Gu 47'; Zou 48', 54'; Li H. 50'

Umpires:
Jung Hee Kim (KOR)
Durga Devi (IND)

== Classification round ==
=== Ninth place game ===
5 October 2023
13:30

Hong Kong	2–1	Indonesia
Chan 14'; Mountain 22'	Report	Prasasti 60'

Umpires:
Ornpimol Kittiteerasopon (THA)
Durga Devi (IND)

=== Seventh place game ===
7 October 2023
10:15

Singapore	2–0	Kazakhstan
Sardonna 2'; Jolene 60'	Report

Umpires:
Soma Chieko (JPN)
Tang Shi Him (HKG)

=== Fifth place game ===
7 October 2023
12:45

Malaysia	2–1	Thailand
Hanis 12'; Nuraini 56'	Report	Kunjira 5'

Umpires:
Kim Jung Hee (KOR)
Chen Jianjun (CHN)

== Medal round ==
=== Bracket ===
Semi-finals
5 October
India	0
China	4
5 October
Japan	2 (3)
South Korea	2 (4)

Final
7 October
China	2
South Korea	0
Third place
7 October
India	2
Japan	1

=== Semi-finals ===
5 October 2023
16:00

India	0–4	China
	Report	Zhong 25'; Zou 40'; Liang 55'; Gu 60'

Umpires:
Annelize Rostron (RSA)
Yoon Seon Kim (KOR)

5 October 2023
18:30

Japan	2–2	South Korea
Kobayakawa 48'; Oikawa 58'	Report	Seo 13'; Park 34'
Penalties
Nagai (penalty shoot-out scored); Toriyama (penalty shoot-out scored); Asai (penalty shoot-out missed); Shimada (penalty shoot-out scored); Suzuki (penalty shoot-out missed)	3–4	(penalty shoot-out scored) Seo; (penalty shoot-out scored) Cheon; (penalty shoot-out scored) Pak; (penalty shoot-out missed) An; (penalty shoot-out scored) Cho

Umpires:
Irene Presenqui (ARG)
Liu Xiaoying (CHN)

=== Bronze medal match ===
7 October 2023
16:00

India	2–1	Japan
Deepika 5'; Chanu 50'	Report	Y. Nagai 30+'

Umpires:
Liu Xiaoying (CHN)
Kim Yoon Seon (KOR)

=== Gold medal match ===
7 October 2023
18:30

China	2–0	South Korea
Chen 7'; Zou 54'	Report

Umpires:
Irene Presenqui (ARG)
Cookie Tan (SGP)

== Statistics ==
=== Final standings ===
Pos	Team	Qualification
1st place, gold medalist(s)	China (H)	2024 Summer Olympics
2nd place, silver medalist(s)	South Korea	2024 FIH Hockey Olympic Qualifiers
3rd place, bronze medalist(s)	India	2024 FIH Hockey Olympic Qualifiers
4	Japan	2024 FIH Hockey Olympic Qualifiers
5	Malaysia	2024 FIH Hockey Olympic Qualifiers
6	Thailand	
7	Singapore	
8	Kazakhstan	
9	Hong Kong	
10	Indonesia	

Source: FIH
(H) Host

=== Goalscorers ===
There were 173 goals scored in 27 matches, for an average of 6.41 goals per match.

9 goals

- (China) Gu Bingfeng

7 goals

- (China) Zhang Ying
- (China) Zhong Jiaqi

6 goals

- (China) Liang Meiyu
- (India) Sangita Kumari
- (Japan) Shiho Kobayakawa

5 goals

- (India) Deepika Sehrawat
- (India) Navneet Kaur
- (Japan) Miyu Hasegawa
- (Japan) Yuri Nagai

4 goals

- (China) Huang Haiyan
- (China) Zou Meirong
- (India) Deep Grace Ekka
- (India) Vandana Katariya
- (Japan) Aimi Kobayashi
- (Japan) Shihori Oikawa
- (Malaysia) Hanis Onn

3 goals

- (China) Chen Yi
- (India) Monika Malik
- (Japan) Hazuki Nagai
- (Japan) Mai Toriyama
- (Malaysia) Nuraini Rashid
- (Singapore) Sardonna Ng

2 goals

- (China) Chen Yang
- (China) Li Hong
- (China) Ma Ning
- (China) Zhang Xiaoxue
- (India) Vaishnavi Phalke
- (India) Sushila Chanu
- (Malaysia) Nur Azhar
- (Malaysia) Norfaiezah Saiuti
- (Malaysia) Fatin Sukri
- (South Korea) An Su-Jin
- (South Korea) Cheon Eun-Bi
- (South Korea) Cho Eun-Ji
- (South Korea) Cho Hye-Jin
- (South Korea) Kim Jeong-Ihn
- (South Korea) Park Seung-Ae
- (South Korea) Seo Jung-Eun
- (Thailand) Kunjira Inpa
- (Thailand) Kornkanok Sanpoung

1 goal

- (China) Dan Wen
- (Hong Kong) Tiffany Chan
- (Hong Kong) Katherine Mountain
- (India) Lalremsiami
- (India) Neha Goyal
- (India) Salima Tete
- (India) Udita Duhan
- (Indonesia) Asri Dewi Prasati
- (Indonesia) Paulina Ronsumbre
- (Japan) Yu Asai
- (Japan) Chiko Fujibayashi
- (Japan) Sakurako Omoto
- (Japan) Miyu Suzuki
- (Kazakhstan) Vera Domashneva
- (Kazakhstan) Viktoriya Lobanova
- (Malaysia) Siti Husain
- (Malaysia) Effarizal Insyriah
- (Malaysia) Khairunnisa Mohamed
- (Malaysia) Siti Mohamed
- (Malaysia) Nurmaizatul Syafi
- (Singapore) Ng Jolene
- (South Korea) Baek Ee-Seul
- (South Korea) Choi Su-ji
- (South Korea) Kang Ji-Na
- (South Korea) Lee Yu-Ri
- (South Korea) Pak Ho-Jeong
- (Thailand) Natthakaran Aunjai
- (Thailand) Suwapat Konthong
- (Thailand) Sudarat Noo-Keaw
- (Thailand) Supansa Samanso

Source: FIH

== See also ==
- 2023 Women's Asian Champions Trophy
