= Pakistan women's national field hockey team =

Pakistan Hockey Federation

Pakistan
- Association: Pakistan Hockey Federation
- Confederation: AHF (Asia)
- Captain: Rizwana Yasmeen
Home	Away

FIH ranking
- Current: 56 (21 September 2026)

Women's AHF Cup
- Appearances: 3 (first in 2003)
- Best result: 4th (in 2003 and 2016)

The Pakistan women's national field hockey team represents Pakistan in international field hockey competitions and is governed by the Pakistan Hockey Federation (PHF).

== History ==
=== Beginnings (1970s–1990s) ===
The first women's national championships were held in Lahore in 1976. It took another seven years (1983) before the national team played its first international matches, against Ireland, at Karachi and Lahore. Malaysia then visited Pakistan for a series of matches in Karachi, Lahore, and Rawalpindi. Tours by China (1985) and Zimbabwe (1986) followed in the following years. Pakistan won all these series.

In 1995, Pakistan drew an exhibition game against Germany 1–1. The same year, it won a series against Kazakhstan.

In 1996, it finished last at the four-team hockey event at the Islamic Solidarity Women Games held in Islamabad. It then visited China and won the only match against the host team. In 1997, Pakistan hosted a four-nation Golden Jubilee Tournament, with Azerbaijan, China, and Singapore also attending. The home team finished last.

=== Further participations (2000s–2020s) ===
In 2003, Pakistan finished fourth in the second edition of the Women's AHF Cup held in Singapore. It participated in the qualifiers for the 2006 Asian Games, and secured the fourth position. In 2012, Pakistan stood sixth in the third edition of the Women's AHF Cup. In September 2013, Pakistan finished fourth in the Asian Women's Challenge Cup held in Bangkok, Thailand.

Pakistan qualified for the semi-final place at the 2016 Women's AHF Cup held in Bangkok, Thailand. However, it lost 5–1 against Thailand, and then finished fourth. In 2017, the team participated in three-nation third edition of the Asian Challenge Cup held in Brunei, where it finished runner-up to Hong Kong.

In January 2018, it participated in the Asian Games qualifiers held in Bangkok, finishing sixth out of seven teams.

== Tournament record ==
=== AHF Cup ===
Women's AHF Cup
No	Year	Host	Position
1	1997	Singapore	-
2	2003	Singapore	4th
3	2012	Singapore	6th
4	2016	Thailand	4th
5	2025	Indonesia	-

== Members ==
Current as of 1 November 2020.

Current Members
Name	Club (domestic)	City	Position	Caps	Goals
Rizwana Yasmeen (Captain)		Gojra	Goalkeeper	20	0
Ambreen Arshad (Vice-captain)	WAPDA	Bahawalpur	Left-in	28	7
Amina Ghaffar	Pakistan Railways	Lahore			
Ayesha Rafiq	Pakistan Army	Hyderabad			
Hamra Latif	WAPDA	Lahore			
Hina Pervaiz		Lahore		16	1
Ibra Sheikh		Lahore		11	0
Iqra Javed		Lahore			
Ishrat Abbas		Gojra		27	3
Kalsoom Shehzadi		Bahawalpur		15	3
Mayra Sabir		Bahawalpur		28	11
Nafeesa Anwar		Gojra		20	0
Rushna Khan		Lahore	Goalkeeper	6	0
Sahrish Waheed		Lahore		11	1
Saira Ashraf	WAPDA	Islamabad		7	0
Taskeen Kausar		Bahawalpur		16	0
Zaib-un-Nisa		Sukkur		21	0
Zakia Nawaz		Sheikhpura		24	0

Former Members
Name	Club (domestic)	City	Position	Caps	Goals
Aamna Mir			Full back		
Amna Awan			Forward		
Aqeela Naseem			Full back		
Asia Sadiq			Full back		
Azra Nasir			Forward		
Benish Hayat			Forward		
Lina Afroz			Full back		
Nadia			Full back		
Neelama Hassan			Forward		
Rabia Qadir (captain)			Forward		
Razia Malik			Forward		
Saima Afzal			Full back		
Saman Rashid			Goalkeeper		
Sanam Yousaf			Full back		
Shumaila Hafeez			Forward		
Sonia Khan			Forward		
Tahseen Safdar			Goalkeeper		
Uzma Lal			Forward		

== See also ==
- Pakistan men's national field hockey team
- Pakistan men's national under-21 field hockey team
