= Asian Hockey Federation =

Asian field hockey governing body

- Abbreviation: AHF
- Formation: 1958; 68 years ago
- Founded at: Tokyo, Japan
- Type: Sports federation
- Headquarters: Kuala Lumpur, Malaysia
- Region served: Asia
- Members: 37 member associations
- Patron: (Malaysia) Al-Sultan Abdullah Sultan Ahmad Shah
- President: (Japan) Dato' Fumio Ogura
- Parent organisation: International Hockey Federation
- Website: asiahockey.org

The Asian Hockey Federation (AHF, formerly ASHF) is the governing body for the sport of field hockey in Asia. It now has 37 member associations in 2026. It is affiliated to the International Hockey Federation. The current president is Fumio Ogura and the patron is Al-Sultan Abdullah Sultan Ahmad Shah.

== Member associations ==
Highlighted are the countries that are part of the Asian Hockey Federation. Eastern Region Central Region Southern Region South-Eastern Region Western Region

=== East (8) ===
- China (1981)
- Chinese Taipei
- Hong Kong (1933)
- Japan (1923)
- South Korea (1947)
- North Korea
- Macau
- Mongolia

=== Central (7) ===
- Afghanistan
- Iran (1972)
- Kazakhstan
- Kyrgyzstan (2024)
- Tajikistan
- Turkmenistan
- Uzbekistan

=== South (5) ===
- Bangladesh (1972)
- India (1925)
- Nepal (1954)
- Pakistan (1948)
- Sri Lanka

=== Southeast (10) ===
- Brunei
- Cambodia
- Indonesia (2009)
- Malaysia (1953)
- Myanmar
- Philippines (2015)
- Singapore (1931)
- Thailand
- Timor-Leste
- Vietnam

=== West (7) ===
- Oman
- Qatar
- Saudi Arabia (2024)
- United Arab Emirates (2024)
- Jordan (2025)
- Bahrain (2025)
- Iraq (2026)

== Tournaments ==
=== Outdoor ===
==== Senior ====
- Asian Games - Men (1958)
- Asian Games - Women (1982)
- Men's Hockey Asia Cup (1982)
- Women's Hockey Asia Cup (1985)
- Men's Asian Champions Trophy (2011)
- Women's Asian Champions Trophy (2010)

==== Junior ====
- Men's Hockey Junior Asia Cup (U21) (1988)
- Women's Hockey Junior Asia Cup (U21) (1992)
- Men's Hockey U18 Asia Cup (AHF Youth Asia Cup) (2001)
- Women's Hockey U18 Asia Cup (AHF Youth Asia Cup) (2000)
- Boys' Hockey U16 Asia Cup (2000 - 2003) - Defunct
- Girls' Hockey U16 Asia Cup (2007) - Abandoned

==== Lower Level ====
- Men's AHF Cup (1997)
- Women's AHF Cup (1997)
- Men's Junior AHF Cup (2003)
- Women's Junior AHF Cup (2003)

==== Others ====
- Hockey Asian Champions Club Cup (1991 - 2010) - Defunct (4 Editions of Men)
- AHF West Asia Cup (2014) - Defunct (1 Edition of Men)
- AHF Central Asia Cup - Men (2019)
- AHF Central Asia Cup - Women (2024)
- Indoor hockey at the 2007 Asian Indoor Games (2007)
- Field hockey at the South Asian Games (1995)
- Field hockey at the SEA Games (2007)
- Indoor hockey at the SEA Games (2017)
- Hockey5s at the 2025 SEA Games (2025)
- Field hockey at the 2013 East Asian Games (2013)
- Sultan Azlan Shah Cup (1983)
- Sultan of Johor Cup (2011)
- Field hockey at the ASEAN University Games
- Field hockey at the ASEAN School Games

=== Hockey5's ===
- Men's Hockey5s Asia Cup (2023)
- Women's Hockey5s Asia Cup (2023)
- Men's U18 Hockey5's Asia Cup (2026)
- Women's U18 Hockey5's Asia Cup (2026)
- Boys' U16 Hockey5s Asia Cup (2013) - Defunct
- Girls' U16 Hockey5s Asia Cup (2013) - Defunct

=== Indoor ===
- Men's Indoor Hockey Asia Cup (2008)
- Women's Indoor Hockey Asia Cup (2009)
- Indoor Hockey Club Asia Cup - Proposed

== Current winners ==
Competition	Men's	Women's
Senior
Asian Games	India (2026)	India (2026)
Asia Cup	India (2025)	China (2025)
Asian Champions Trophy	India (2026)	India (2024)
AHF Cup	Oman (2025)	Singapore (2025)
Junior (Under-22/21/20)
Junior Asia Cup	India (2026)	India (2026)
Junior AHF Cup	South Korea (2026)	Bangladesh (2026)
Youth (Under-18)
U18 Asia Cup	India (2026)	China (2026)
Hockey5's
Hockey5's Asia Cup	India (2023)	India (2023)
U18 Hockey5's Asia Cup	India (2026)	China (2026)
Others
AHF Central Asia Cup	Kazakhstan (2025)	Indonesia (2025)
Indoor Asia Cup	Iran (2024)	Thailand (2024)

== World rankings ==
=== Field Hockey ===
Men's FIH Rankings as of 6 November 2026
AHF	FIH	Change	Team	Points
1	8	Steady	India	3173.13
2	12	Steady	Pakistan	2555.59
3	14	▲1	Malaysia	2526.03
4	15	▲2	Japan	2412.1
5	20	▲3	South Korea	2136.03
6	22	▼2	China	2106.99
7	28	Steady	Bangladesh	1804
8	31	▼6	Oman	1773.31
9	38	Steady	Sri Lanka	1650.99
10	43	▲5	Thailand	1517.42
11	47	Steady	Chinese Taipei	1470.86
12	50	▲4	Singapore	1438.15
13	52	▼1	Hong Kong	1433.98
14	55	▼9	Uzbekistan	1421.14
15	66	▲1	Afghanistan	1365
16	67	▲1	Brunei	1364.44
17	70	▲1	Myanmar	1357.97
18	71	▲1	Kazakhstan	1355.46
19	74	▲2	Nepal	1325
20	75	▲2	Vietnam	1314.14
21	77	▲2	Qatar	1310
22	83	▼25	Indonesia	1284.67
23	84	Steady	Macau	1263.21
24	92	Steady	Iran	1178.89
25	97	Steady	Cambodia	697.1
26	98	Steady	Tajikistan	651.63
27	99	Steady	Kyrgyzstan	541.85
Change from 31 August 2026

Women's FIH Rankings as of 3 October 2026
AHF	FIH	Change	Team	Points
1	4	Steady	China	3118.34
2	7	▲1	India	3053.45
3	11	Steady	Japan	2467.91
4	15	▲2	South Korea	2109.81
5	21	Steady	Malaysia	1971.19
6	28	▼1	Thailand	1617.3
7	34	Steady	Hong Kong	1426.06
8	39	▲3	Chinese Taipei	1263.84
9	42	▲4	Indonesia	1229.65
10	44	▼4	Kazakhstan	1215.28
11	45	▼7	Singapore	1205.8
12	56	Steady	Pakistan	1172
13	66	▼1	Uzbekistan	1095
14	67	Steady	Brunei	1094.7
15	70	Steady	Sri Lanka	1058.09
16	75	Steady	Cambodia	992.94
17	82	Steady	Tajikistan	668.53
18	85	Steady	Bangladesh	353.64
19	86	Steady	Kyrgyzstan	280.22
Change from 31 August 2026
