= Field hockey at the 2023 SEA Games – Men's tournament =

Field hockey in 2023 SEA Games

Men's field hockey at the 2023 SEA Games

Tournament details
- Host country: Cambodia
- City: Phnom Penh
- Dates: 9–16 May
- Teams: 5 (from 1 confederation)
- Venue: Morodok Techo National Stadium

Final positions
- Champions: Malaysia
- Runner-up: Singapore

Tournament statistics
- Matches played: 11
- Goals scored: 53 (4.82 per match)
- Top scorer: (Malaysia) Azahar Amirul (6 goals)

The men's field hockey tournament at the 2023 SEA Games will take place from 9 to 16 May 2023 at the Morodok Techo National Stadium, Phnom Penh, Cambodia. 5 teams took part in the competition.

== Squad ==
| Cambodia (CAM) | Indonesia (INA) | Malaysia (MAS) |
|---|---|---|
| Head Coach: (Pakistan) Rana Asif Maqsood; Chanty Chorn; Rasheed Ammar; Nokhaiz Ahmad; Khawar Shaib; Prosith Heng; Rana Ur; Rana Ammar; Arslan Muhamad; Ravuth Kean; Yasir Muhamad; Aamir Khan; Rehman Abdul; Seu Sey; Chheng Ho; Koemsan Sie; Salman Butt; Visal Sok; Rana Anas | Head Coach: (Malaysia) Krishnamurthy Gobinathan; Rumaropen Julius; Muhamad Fadli; Alam Asrul; Rahmad Astri; Atwo Frank; Asasi Ahdan; Ardam; Fajar Alam; Priliandro Revo; Prastyo Alfandy; Efendi Jerry; Raditya Derangga; Fathur Mochamad; Wibowo Arthur; Maulana Nurul; Al Akbar Abdullah; Al Ardh Aulia; Guntara Andrea | Head Coach: (Malaysia) Muhamad Amin Rahim; Mohamad Rafaizul Saini; Muhammad Najib Abu Hassan; Wan Muhammad Najmie; Muhamad Ramadan Rosli; Faris Harizan; Perabu Tangaraja; Azmilmuizzudin Misron; Harris Iskandar Osman; Mughni Kamal; Alfarico Lance Liau Jr; Muhammad Addy Jazmi Jamlus; Shahmie Irfan Suhaimi; Muhammad Danish Aiman; Mohd Zaimi Mat Deris; Andywalfian Jeffrynus; Amirul Hamizan Azahar; Muhammad Adam Ashraf Johari; Muhammad Danish Danial |
| Singapore (SGP) | Thailand (THA) | |
| Head Coach: (Singapore) Krishnan Vijayan Naidu; Xuan Wee Wei; Kent Loo; Fariz Basir; Enrico Marican; Jaspal Grewal; Dineshraj Naidu; Darren Sia; Silas Noor; Ashriq Zul'kepli; Ramanan Thulasiram; Abu Nufail; Lee Yap Wee; Dawnraj Rengasamy; Hariraj Naidu; Zaki Zulkarnan; Bazil Kahar; Jeremiah Balakrishnan; Gugan Sandran | Head Coach: (South Korea) Kim Kyung Soo; Wistawas Phosawang; Kraiwich Thawichat; Tanwa Yongthong; Kritsada Chueamkaew; Sadakorn Vimuttanon; Aphiwat Thanperm; Ratthawit Khamkong; Worawut Kaeochianghwang; Chutiphong Samoema; Kritsana Phumee; Nattapong Trisom; Borirak Harapan; Chanachol Rungniyom; Suriya Kasonbua; Wirawat Singthong; Thanakrit Boon-Art; Tanakit Juntakian; Somrat Boontam | |

== Results ==
=== Group stage ===
| Pos | Team | Pld | W | D | L | GF | GA | GD | Pts | Qualification |
|---|---|---|---|---|---|---|---|---|---|---|
| 1 | Malaysia | 4 | 4 | 0 | 0 | 19 | 5 | +14 | 12 | Advance to Gold Medal Match |
| 2 | Singapore | 4 | 2 | 1 | 1 | 15 | 8 | +7 | 7 | Advance to Gold Medal Match |
| 3 | Indonesia | 4 | 2 | 1 | 1 | 10 | 7 | +3 | 7 | Bronze Medal |
| 4 | Thailand | 4 | 1 | 0 | 3 | 4 | 14 | −10 | 3 | Bronze Medal |
| 5 | Cambodia (H) | 4 | 0 | 0 | 4 | 2 | 16 | −14 | 0 | |

Source: FIH
(H) Hosts

9 May 2023
15:00

| Singapore | 2–2 | Indonesia |
|---|---|---|
| Zul'kepli Ashriq 4'; Marican Enrico 19' | Report | Al Ardh Aulia 46', 59' |

Umpires:
Ali Shahbaz (Bangladesh)
Thipak Kanabathu (Thailand)

9 May 2023
19:30

| Thailand | 2–1 | Cambodia |
|---|---|---|
| Harapan Borirak 5'; Chueamkaew Kritsada 21' | Report | Khawar Shaib 57' |

Umpires:
Salman (Indonesia)
Shigeki Kodama (Japan)

10 May 2023
17:00

| Malaysia | 6–0 | Cambodia |
|---|---|---|
| Hassan Najib 3'; Azahar Amirul 18'; Muhammad Danish Aiman 20'; Liau Alfarico 44'; Shahmie Irfan Suhaimi 54'; Adam Ashraf 59' | Report |

Umpires:
Noppadon Prompim (Thailand)
Hari Silvarajoo (Singapore)

11 May 2023
09:30

| Thailand | 1–2 | Indonesia |
|---|---|---|
| Chueamkaew Kritsada 11' | Report | Al Akbar Abdullah 47'; Maulana Nurul 54' |

Umpires:
Shigeki Kodama (Japan)
Thipak Kanabathu (Thailand)

11 May 2023
17:00

| Singapore | 3–4 | Malaysia |
|---|---|---|
| Noor Silas 36', 52'; Naidu Dineshraj 45' | Report | Azahar Amirul 14', 45'; Liau Alfarico 42'; Hassan Najib 56' |

Umpires:
Salman (Indonesia)
Ali Shahbaz (Bangladesh)

12 May 2023
17:15

| Indonesia | 4–0 | Cambodia |
|---|---|---|
| Al Ardh Aulia 21', 60'; Al Akbar Abdullah 28'; Priliandro Revo 42' | Report |

Umpires:
Ali Shahbaz (Bangladesh)
Shigeki Kodama (Japan)

13 May 2023
08:00

| Thailand | 0–5 | Malaysia |
|---|---|---|
| | Report | Shahmie Irfan Suhaimi 11', 19', 48'; Hassan Najib 16'; Harris Osman 28' |

Umpires:
Salman (Indonesia)
Hari Silvarajoo (Singapore)

13 May 2023
14:00

| Cambodia | 1–4 | Singapore |
|---|---|---|
| Rasheed Ammar 8' | Report | Zul'kepli Ashriq 23', 46'; Loo Kent 48', 50' |

Umpires:
Noppadon Prompim (Thailand)
Thipak Kanabathu (Thailand)

14 May 2023
14:00

| Malaysia | 4–2 | Indonesia |
|---|---|---|
| Shahmie Irfan Suhaimi 27'; Hassan Najib 27'; Harris Osman 35'; Azahar Amirul 42' | Report | Raditya Derangga 43', 44' |

Umpires:
Ali Shahbaz (Bangladesh)
Hari Silvarajoo (Singapore)

14 May 2023
16:00

| Singapore | 6–1 | Thailand |
|---|---|---|
| Zul'kepli Ashriq 16'; Marican Enrico 22'; Loo Kent 30', 51'; Kahar Bazil 36'; Thulasiram Ramanan 44' | Report | Phumee Kritsana 52' |

Umpires:
Salman (Indonesia)
Shigeki Kodama (Japan)

=== Gold Medal Match ===
16 May 2023
16:30

| Malaysia | 3–0 | Singapore |
|---|---|---|
| Azahar Amirul 15', 37'; Liau Alfarico 47' | Report |

Umpires:
Ali Shahbaz (Bangladesh)
Shigeki Kodama (Japan)

== Final standing ==
| Rank | Team |
|---|---|
| 1st place, gold medalist(s) | Malaysia |
| 2nd place, silver medalist(s) | Singapore |
| 3rd place, bronze medalist(s) | Indonesia |
| 3rd place, bronze medalist(s) | Thailand |
| 5 | Cambodia |

== See also ==
- Field hockey at the 2023 SEA Games – Women's tournament
