= 1993 Women's Hockey Asia Cup =

International field hockey tournament

Tournament details
- Host country: Japan
- City: Hiroshima
- Dates: November 5–13
- Teams: 7 (from 1 confederation)

Final positions
- Champions: South Korea (2nd title)
- Runner-up: China
- Third place: India

Tournament statistics
- Matches played: 13
- Goals scored: 63 (4.85 per match)

The 1993 Women's Hockey Asia Cup was the third edition of the Women's Hockey Asia Cup. It was held in Hiroshima, Japan from 5 November to 13 November 1993.

South Korea won the title, with China finishing second while India took the third place.

== Teams ==
- China
- India
- Japan
- Singapore
- South Korea
- Thailand
- Uzbekistan

== Results ==
=== Group A ===
Pos	Team	Pld	W	D	L	GF	GA	GD	Pts	Qualification
1	South Korea	2	1	1	0	9	1	+8	3	Advanced to Semi-finals
2	India	2	1	1	0	7	1	+6	3	Advanced to Semi-finals
3	Singapore	2	0	0	2	0	14	−14	0	

Source: Todor66
Rules for classification: 1) points; 2) goal difference; 3) goals scored; 4) head-to-head result.

=== Matches ===
6 November 1993

South Korea	8–0	Singapore

8 November 1993

India	6–0	Singapore

10 November 1993

South Korea	1–1	India
Dong-suk 66'		Mathews 69'

=== Group B ===
Pos	Team	Pld	W	D	L	GF	GA	GD	Pts	Qualification
1	China	3	2	1	0	22	1	+21	5	Advanced to Semi-finals
2	Japan (H)	3	1	2	0	10	0	+10	4	Advanced to Semi-finals
3	Uzbekistan	3	1	1	1	4	8	−4	3	
4	Thailand	3	0	0	3	0	27	−27	0	

Source: Todor66
Rules for classification: 1) points; 2) goal difference; 3) goals scored; 4) head-to-head result.
(H) Hosts

=== Matches ===
5 November 1993

Japan	10–0	Thailand

5 November 1993

China	8–1	Uzbekistan

6 November 1993

China	14–0	Thailand

6 November 1993

Japan	0–0	Uzbekistan

9 November 1993

Uzbekistan	3–0	Thailand

9 November 1993

China	0–0	Japan

=== First to fourth place classification ===
Semi-finals
12 November
China	3
India	0
12 November
South Korea (p.s.o.)	2 (5)
Japan	2 (4)

Final
13 November
South Korea	3
China	0
Third place
13 November
India	1
Japan	0

==== Semi-finals ====
12 November 1993

China	3–0	India
Huiping 4'; Donghong 15'; Fu Bin 34'

12 November 1993

South Korea	2–2	Japan
Dong-suk 24'; Yeong-mi		Takahashi 29'; Kato
Penalties
	5–4

==== Third place game ====
13 November 1993

India	1–0	Japan
Mathews

==== Final ====
13 November 1993

South Korea	3–0	China

== Winners ==
1993 Women's Hockey Asia Cup winners

South Korea
Second title

== Final standings ==
Rank	Team
1st place, gold medalist(s)	South Korea
2nd place, silver medalist(s)	China
3rd place, bronze medalist(s)	India
4	Japan
5	Uzbekistan
6	Singapore
7	Thailand
