= Benish Hayat =

Field hockey player and referee

Personal information
- Born: Lahore, Pakistan

Sport
- Sport: Field hockey
National team
Years	Team	Caps	Goals
2004–2011	Pakistan	10	-

Benish Hayat also spelt as Binish Hayat is a former international field hockey player and current international umpire from Pakistan. To date, she is Pakistan's only international women umpire.

Since 2017, she has the status of a "Promising Umpire" which entitles her to officiate in matches throughout the world.

== Career (player) ==
Hayat took up hockey during her college days at Government College for Women, Wahdat Road, Lahore in 2002.

=== National ===
Hayat represented WAPDA throughout her playing career (2004–2011).

=== International ===
Hayat was part of the national team between 2004 and 2011, earning 10 caps. Her only overseas tournament was the 2006 Asian Games qualifiers held in Kuala Lumpur, Malaysia in June where the team placed 4th. The team qualified for the 2006 Asian Games held in Doha, Qatar but later withdrew.

== Career (Umpiring) ==
Her mentor is the Pakistani international umpire, Haider Rasool.

=== National ===
Hayat officiated in the men's National Tray Hockey Championships held in Lahore in October–November 2020.

=== International ===
Hayat umpired her first match in December 2012 at the Women Asia Cup held in Singapore and to date has officiated in 49 matches. In 2013, as a result of her performance at the Asian Challenge in Bangkok, Thailand she was officially given the status of an "International Umpire" by the FIH. She continued with this status until 2017, when she was promoted and given the status of a "Promising Umpire." This status entitles her to officiate in matches throughout the world including in FIH events. She has officiated matches at the senior and junior (under 21) levels. She has attended courses including the Olympic Solidarity Technical Course for Coaches and FIH Qualified Hockey Academy Educator.

At the 2018 Asian Games, she officiated in women's matches of Pool A as well as the 9/10 classification match. She was the on field umpire in 4 matches, reserve umpire in 2 and video umpire in 1.

Events officiated in
Dates	Competition	M/W	Location	Type	Role	Umpire	Video Umpire	Reserve Umpire
September 2013	Asian Challenge	Women	Bangkok, Thailand	Senior outdoor	Umpire	5	--	3
February 2014	Asian Games Qualifying Tournament	Women	Bangkok, Thailand	Senior outdoor	National Umpire	3	--	3
September 2015	Junior Asia Cup	Women	Changzhou, China	Under 21 outdoor	Umpire	4	--	3
February 2016	South Asian Games	Men	Guwahati, India	Senior outdoor	Neutral Umpire	0	--	--
February 2016	South Asian Games	Women	Guwahati, India	Senior outdoor	Neutral Umpire	4	--	--
October 2016	4th Women's AHF Cup	Women	Bangkok, Thailand	Senior outdoor	Umpire	5	--	4
August 2017	SEA Games	Women	Kuala Lumpur, Malaysia	Senior outdoor	Neutral Umpire	4	--	1
January 2018	Asian Games Qualifiers	Women	Bangkok, Thailand	Senior outdoor	National Umpire	7	--	2
July 2018	Hockey Series Open - Singapore	Women	Singapore	Senior outdoor	Neutral Umpire	3	--	2
August–September 2018	Asian Games	Women	Jakarta, Indonesia	Senior outdoor	Umpire	4	1	2
September 2019	AirAsia Women's Junior AHF Cup	Women	Singapore	Under 21 outdoor	Neutral Umpire	4	--	1

Asian Games (2018)
Date	Teams	Result	Status
19 August 2018	Japan vs Chinese Taipei	11-0	Umpire
23 August 2018	Hong Kong vs Chinese Taipei	2-3	Umpire
27 August 2018	China vs Hong Kong	15-0	Umpire
31 August 2018	Hong Kong vs Kazakhstan	2-0	Umpire
25 August 2018	Chinese Taipei vs Malaysia	0-11	Video Umpire
21 August 2018	China vs Chinese Taipei	9-0	Reserve Umpire
25 August 2018	Japan vs China	4-2	Reserve Umpire

== Hockey Academy ==
In 2016, Hayat established the Canex Hockey Academy in Lahore to train girls between the ages of 8 and 13.
