= Field hockey at the 2023 SEA Games – Women's tournament =

Women's field hockey at the 2023 SEA Games

Tournament details
- Host country: Cambodia
- City: Phnom Penh
- Dates: 9–16 May
- Teams: 5 (from 1 confederation)
- Venue: Morodok Techo National Stadium

Final positions
- Champions: Malaysia
- Runner-up: Thailand

Tournament statistics
- Matches played: 11
- Goals scored: 48 (4.36 per match)
- Top scorer: (Malaysia) Zulkifli Nuramirah (5 goals)

The women's field hockey tournament at the 2023 SEA Games will take place from 9 to 16 May 2023 at the Morodok Techo National Stadium, Phnom Penh, Cambodia. 5 teams took part in the competition.

== Squad ==
Cambodia (CAM)	Indonesia (INA)	Malaysia (MAS)
Head Coach: (Cambodia) Chheoung Sovanphearom; Misan Phor; Ry Heng; Raksa Sin; Saroeu Vun; Tayyaba Rani; Mam Ta; Monika Lun; Chakriya Eng; Kanwel Nagris; Sreysros Eng; Mengyean Thai; Rabia Noor; Koeurm Prom; Sorphorn Seng; Laiba Parveen; Nida Majeed; Chansovatey Duch; Koemyean Dy	Head Coach: (Malaysia) Krishnamurthy Gobinathan; Greschela; Widiyana Saruli; Dwi Aulia Rahma; Adriana Asa; Lispa; Yuanita Suwito; Since Novita; Nur Anisa; Melinda; Nisa Indira; Sismya Winarsih; Annur El Islamy; Adna Fika; Salma Maulani; Selly Florentina; Paulina Ronsumbre; Dian Wildiani; Ruth Bransik	Head Coach: (Malaysia) Mohamed Nasihin Nubil Ibrahim; Siti Zalia Nasir; Nuraini Abdul Rashid; Nur Insyirah Effarizal; Dayang Nuramirah Abang; Azhari Azmyra; Juliani Mohamad Din; Siti Nur Arfah Mohd Nor; Nur Afiqah Syahzani Azhar; Mashitah Ab Khalid; Nurul Faezah Khalim; Wan Norfaiezah Md Saiuti; Fatin Shafikah Mahd Sukri; Nur Syuhada Suhaimi; Nurul Fatin Fatiah Azman; Khairunnisa Ayuni Mohd; Nuramirah Zulkifli; Nurmaizatul Hanim Syafi; Kirandeep Kaur Gurdip
Singapore (SGP)	Thailand (THA)	
Head Coach: (Australia) David Viner; Tong Liu Yu; Patricia Collera; Jolene Ng; Puay Ho; Sofia Saban Nurul; Johana Hajaratih; Toh Li Min; Shubhaa Manimaran; Laura Tan; Cheryll Chia; Felissa Lai; Phylicia Tanandika; Sardonna Ng; Megan Francis; Valerie Koh; Amani Sherie; Valerie Sim; Nithira Manimaran	Head Coach: (South Korea) Wook Bae Young; Kawintida Wisuttiprapa; Chanthakan Phanchanang; Jenjira Kijpakdee; Suwapat Konthong; Sirikwan Wongkeaw; Parichart Phopool; Kunjira Inpa; Kornkanok Sanpoung; Onuma Doungsuda; Natthakarn Aunjai; Supansa Samanso; Atittaya Sumphowthong; Songkran Pasawat; Anongnat Piresram; Siraya Yimkrajang; Watsana Saetan; Kessarin Kamphol	

== Results ==
=== Group stage ===
Pos	Team	Pld	W	D	L	GF	GA	GD	Pts	Qualification
1	Malaysia	4	4	0	0	21	2	+19	12	Advance to Gold Medal Match
2	Thailand	4	2	0	2	9	6	+3	6	Advance to Gold Medal Match
3	Singapore	4	1	2	1	6	8	−2	5	Bronze Medal
4	Indonesia	4	0	2	2	3	12	−9	2	Bronze Medal
5	Cambodia (H)	4	0	2	2	4	15	−11	2	

Source: FIH
(H) Hosts

9 May 2023
09:30

Singapore	2–2	Indonesia
Toh Li Min 46'; Johana Hajaratih 49'	Report	Anisa Nur 44'; Since Novita 55'

Umpires:
Dahiya Deepa (India)
Shahiela Johari (Malaysia)

9 May 2023
17:15

Thailand	5–1	Cambodia
Samanso Supansa 1', 41'; Sanpoung Kornkanok 4'; Piresram Anongnat 27'; Noo-Keaw Sudarat 43'	Report	Eng Chakriya 4'

Umpires:
Binish Hayat (Pakistan)
Tan Cookie (Singapore)

10 May 2023
17:15

Malaysia	8–1	Cambodia
Azhar Nur 8'; Mohd Siti 10', 19'; Rashid Nuraini 12', 28'; Zulkifli Nuramirah 27'; Sukri Fatin 35'; Syafi Nurmaizatul 48'	Report	Duch Chansovatey 13'

Umpires:
Binish Hayat (Pakistan)
Mitra Syumanja (Indonesia)

11 May 2023
15:00

Thailand	4–1	Indonesia
Noo-Keaw Sudarat 3'; Piresram Anongnat 14', 29'; Aunjai Natthakarn 27'	Report	Maulani Salma 57'

Umpires:
Phea Phut (Cambodia)
Nur Hidayah Suhaimi (Malaysia)

12 May 2023
09:30

Singapore	1–4	Malaysia
Ng Jolene 16'	Report	Saiuti Norfaiezah 8'; Zulkifli Nuramirah 33', 48'; Mohd Khairunnisa 36'

Umpires:
Ornpimol Kittiteerasopon (Thailand)
Binish Hayat (Pakistan)

12 May 2023
16:00

Indonesia	0–0	Cambodia
	Report

Umpires:
Tan Cookie (Singapore)
Dahiya Deepa (India)

13 May 2023
10:00

Thailand	0–3	Malaysia
	Report	Mohd Khairunnisa 22'; Sukri Fatin 25'; Rashid Nuraini 28'

Umpires:
Binish Hayat (Pakistan)
Mitra Syumanja (Indonesia)

13 May 2023
16:00

Cambodia	2–2	Singapore
Eng Chakriya; Mam Ta 54'	Report	Johana Hajaratih 45'; Toh Li Min 47'

Umpires:
Shahiela Johari (Malaysia)
Nur Hidayah Suhaimi (Malaysia)

15 May 2023
14:00

Malaysia	6–0	Indonesia
Syafi Nurmaizatul 1'; Zulkifli Nuramirah 8', 49'; Mohd Khairunnisa 35', 54'; Azhar Nur 54'

Umpires:
Tan Cookie (Singapore)
Ornpimol Kittiteerasopon (Thailand)

15 May 2023
16:00

Singapore	1–0	Thailand
Sim Valerie 39'	Report

Umpires:
Dahiya Deepa (India)
Nur Hidayah Suhaimi (Malaysia)

=== Gold Medal Match ===
16 May 2023
16:00

Malaysia	4–1	Thailand
Mohd Siti 5'; Rashid Nuraini 17'; Syafi Nurmaizatul 28'; Azhar Nur 40'	Report	Aunjai Natthakarn 3'

Umpires:
Dahiya Deepa (India)
Binish Hayat (Pakistan)

== Standings ==
Rank	Team
1st place, gold medalist(s)	Malaysia
2nd place, silver medalist(s)	Thailand
3rd place, bronze medalist(s)	Singapore
3rd place, bronze medalist(s)	Indonesia
5	Cambodia

== See also ==
- Field hockey at the 2023 SEA Games – Men's tournament
