= Field hockey at the 2013 SEA Games =

- Start date: 13 December 2013
- End date: 20 December 2013

Champions
- Men: Malaysia
- Women: Malaysia

Field hockey at the 2013 SEA Games was held over a nine-day period beginning on 13 December and culminated with the medal finals on 20 and 21 December 2013. All games were held at Theinphyu Hockey Field Stadium, Yangon.

== Medal summary ==
=== Medal table ===
* Host nation (Myanmar)

Rank	Nation	Gold	Silver	Bronze	Total
1	Malaysia	2	0	0	2
2	Singapore	0	1	0	1
2	Thailand	0	1	0	1
4	Myanmar*	0	0	2	2
Totals (4 entries)		2	2	2	6

== Participating teams ==
Men	Women
Singapore; Malaysia; Myanmar; Thailand; Vietnam	Indonesia; Malaysia; Myanmar; Thailand; Singapore; Cambodia

== Men's tournament ==
All times are Myanmar Time – UTC+6:30.

=== Group stage ===
Key to colours in group tables
Group winners and runners-up advanced to the Gold Medal Match
Third and fourth place advanced to the Bronze Medal Match

==== Men's Pool ====
Team	Pld	W	D	L	GF	GA	GD	Pts
Malaysia	4	4	0	0	43	0	+43	12
Singapore	4	3	0	1	20	7	+13	9
Thailand	4	2	0	2	12	22	−10	6
Myanmar	4	1	0	3	10	16	−6	3
Vietnam	4	0	0	4	1	41	−40	0

13 December 2013
07:00

Singapore	12 – 0	Vietnam

Theinphyu Hockey Field Stadium, Yangon
13 December 2013
09:00

Thailand	3 – 2	Myanmar

Theinphyu Hockey Field Stadium, Yangon

15 December 2013
13:00

Malaysia	13 – 0	Vietnam

Theinphyu Hockey Field Stadium, Yangon
15 December 2013
15:00

Singapore	1 – 0	Myanmar

Theinphyu Hockey Field Stadium, Yangon

16 December 2013
13:00

Thailand	0 – 13	Malaysia

Theinphyu Hockey Field Stadium, Yangon
16 December 2013
15:00

Myanmar	8 – 1	Vietnam

Theinphyu Hockey Field Stadium, Yangon

18 December 2013
13:00

Vietnam	0 – 8	Thailand

Theinphyu Hockey Field Stadium, Yangon
18 December 2013
15:00

Singapore	0 – 6	Malaysia

Theinphyu Hockey Field Stadium, Yangon

19 December 2013
13:00

Thailand	1 – 7	Singapore

Theinphyu Hockey Field Stadium, Yangon
19 December 2013
15:00

Malaysia	11 – 0	Myanmar

Theinphyu Hockey Field Stadium, Yangon

==== Bronze medal match ====
21 December 2013
12:00

Thailand	0 – 2	Myanmar

Theinphyu Hockey Field Stadium, Yangon

==== Gold medal match ====
21 December 2013
14:30

Malaysia	5 – 0	Singapore

Theinphyu Hockey Field Stadium, Yangon

==== Final standing ====
Rank	Team
1st place, gold medalist(s)	Malaysia
2nd place, silver medalist(s)	Singapore
3rd place, bronze medalist(s)	Myanmar
4	Thailand
5	Vietnam

== Women's tournament ==
All times are Myanmar Time – UTC+6:30.

=== Group stage ===
Key to colours in group tables
Group winners and runners-up advanced to the Gold Medal Match
Third and fourth place advanced to the Bronze Medal Match
Fifth and sixth place advanced to the Fifth Place Match

==== Women's Pool ====
Team	Pld	W	D	L	GF	GA	GD	Pts
Malaysia	5	5	0	0	66	1	+65	15
Thailand	5	3	1	1	33	8	+25	10
Singapore	5	3	0	2	23	14	+9	9
Myanmar	5	2	1	2	9	8	+1	7
Indonesia	5	1	0	4	16	16	0	3
Cambodia	5	0	0	5	0	100	−100	0

13 December 2013
11:00

Thailand	26 – 0	Cambodia

Theinphyu Hockey Field Stadium, Yangon
13 December 2013
13:00

Singapore	2 – 1	Indonesia

Theinphyu Hockey Field Stadium, Yangon
13 December 2013
15:00

Malaysia	6 – 0	Myanmar

Theinphyu Hockey Field Stadium, Yangon

14 December 2013
11:00

Thailand	3 – 0	Indonesia

Theinphyu Hockey Field Stadium, Yangon
14 December 2013
13:00

Malaysia	36 – 0	Cambodia

Theinphyu Hockey Field Stadium, Yangon
14 December 2013
15:00

Myanmar	1 – 2	Singapore

Theinphyu Hockey Field Stadium, Yangon

16 December 2013
07:00

Indonesia	15 – 0	Cambodia

Theinphyu Hockey Field Stadium, Yangon
16 December 2013
09:00

Myanmar	0 – 0	Thailand

Theinphyu Hockey Field Stadium, Yangon
16 December 2013
11:00

Singapore	1 – 8	Malaysia

Theinphyu Hockey Field Stadium, Yangon

17 December 2013
11:00

Cambodia	0 – 16	Singapore

Theinphyu Hockey Field Stadium, Yangon
17 December 2013
13:00

Indonesia	0 – 1	Myanmar

Theinphyu Hockey Field Stadium, Yangon
17 December 2013
15:00

Thailand	0 – 6	Malaysia

Theinphyu Hockey Field Stadium, Yangon

19 December 2013
07:00

Cambodia	0 – 7	Myanmar

Theinphyu Hockey Field Stadium, Yangon
19 December 2013
09:00

Singapore	2 – 4	Thailand

Theinphyu Hockey Field Stadium, Yangon
19 December 2013
11:00

Malaysia	10 – 0	Indonesia

Theinphyu Hockey Field Stadium, Yangon

==== Fifth and sixth place match ====
20 December 2013
09:30

Indonesia	8 – 0	Cambodia

Theinphyu Hockey Field Stadium, Yangon

==== Bronze medal match ====
20 December 2013
12:00

Singapore	0 – 1	Myanmar

Theinphyu Hockey Field Stadium, Yangon

==== Gold medal match ====
20 December 2013
14:30

Malaysia	6 – 1	Thailand

Theinphyu Hockey Field Stadium, Yangon

==== Final standing ====
Rank	Team
1st place, gold medalist(s)	Malaysia
2nd place, silver medalist(s)	Thailand
3rd place, bronze medalist(s)	Myanmar
4	Singapore
5	Indonesia
6	Cambodia
