= Islamic Republic of Iran Hockey Federation =

Governing body of field hockey in Iran

- Iran Hockey logo
- Abbreviation: Iran Hockey
- Formation: 1972
- Location: Tehran, Iran
- President: Bahram Ghadimi
- Affiliations: FIH, ASHF, NOCIRI
- Website: www.iranhockey.org

The Iran Hockey Federation (IHF) is the national governing body for field hockey in Iran. It is affiliated to the International Hockey Federation (FIH). The headquarters of the federation are in Tehran.

The current IHF interim president in 2018 was Bahram Ghadimi and the Secretary was Behrouz Gordan.

== See also ==
- Iran men's national field hockey team
