= Hockey Hong Kong, China =

Governing body of field hockey in Hong Kong

- Sport: Field hockey
- Jurisdiction: Hong Kong
- Founded: June 22, 1933
- Affiliation: FIH
- Regional affiliation: AHF
- President: Sarinder Dillon
- Secretary: Ernest Li
- Men's coach: Kulwant Singh Dillon
- Women's coach: Arifali

Official website
- www.hockey.org.hk
- (Hong Kong)

The Hockey Hong Kong, China (formerly Hong Kong Hockey Association) is the sports governing body of field hockey in Hong Kong. It is affiliated with two hockey federations, the IHF International Hockey Federation and AHF Asian Hockey Federation. The headquarters of the federation are in Hong Kong.

Sarinder Dillon is the President of the Hong Kong Hockey Association and Ernest Li is the Secretary General.

== See also ==
- Hong Kong men's national field hockey team
- Hong Kong women's national field hockey team
