= 2016 Women's AHF Cup =

Tournament of the Women's Hockey Asia Cup

Tournament details
- Host country: Thailand
- City: Bangkok
- Dates: 1–9 October
- Teams: 9 (from 1 confederation)

Final positions
- Champions: Thailand (1st title)
- Runner-up: Singapore
- Third place: Chinese Taipei

Tournament statistics
- Matches played: 23
- Goals scored: 176 (7.65 per match)
- Top scorer: (Thailand) Tikhamporn Sakulpithak (16 goals)

The 2016 Women's AHF Cup was the fourth edition of the Women's AHF Cup, the quadrennial qualification tournament for the Women's Hockey Asia Cup organized by the Asian Hockey Federation. It was held from 1 to 9 October 2016 in Bangkok, Thailand. The top two teams qualified for the 2017 Women's Hockey Asia Cup.

The hosts Thailand won their first AHF Cup title by defeating Singapore 4–0 in the final. The defending champions Chinese Taipei won the bronze medal by defeating Pakistan 4–1.

== Preliminary round ==
=== Pool A ===
Pos	Team	Pld	W	D	L	GF	GA	GD	Pts	Qualification
1	Thailand (H)	4	4	0	0	28	2	+26	12	Semi-finals
2	Chinese Taipei	4	3	0	1	28	5	+23	9	Semi-finals
3	Sri Lanka	4	2	0	2	23	10	+13	6	
4	Uzbekistan	4	1	0	3	18	8	+10	3	
5	Indonesia	4	0	0	4	0	72	−72	0	

Source: FIH
Rules for classification: 1) points; 2) matches won; 3) goal difference; 4) goals for; 5) head-to-head result; 6) field goals for.
(H) Hosts

1 October 2016
15:00

Chinese Taipei	21–0	Indonesia
Yang Chia Hua 2'; Liu Yu Chen 6', 24', 44', 45', 62', 66'; Su Pei Ling 7', !4', 36', 56', 58'; Chang Ting Yu 7'; Lin Wen 18', 38'; Liao Pei-Shan 20', 32'; Lin Ting Yun 25'; Yang Chia Yu 41', 59'; Fan Yu 65'	Report

Umpires:
Junko Wagatsuma (JPN)
Binish Hayat (PAK)

1 October 2016
17:00

Sri Lanka	3–1	Uzbekistan
Wijesooriya 25', 32', 57'	Report	Berdieva 18'

Umpires:
Tang Shi Him (HKG)
Cookie Tan (SGP)

2 October 2016
17:00

Sri Lanka	19–0	Indonesia
Jayaneththi 5', 11', 29'; Wijesooriya 14', 27', 32', 38', 47', 48', 52', 65', 67'; Weerabahu 17', 25', 59', 68', 70+'; Gangedura 24'; Panawala 57'	Report

Umpires:
Cookie Tan (SGP)
Nageen Babar (PAK)

2 October 2016
19:00

Thailand	3–1	Uzbekistan
Aunjai 27'; Sakulpithak 42'; Samanso 52'	Report	Berdieva 67'

Umpires:
Junko Wagatsuma (JPN)
Tang Shi Him (HKG)

3 October 2016
19:00

Chinese Taipei	1–4	Thailand
Liao Pei-Shan 57'	Report	Sakulpithak 5', 23', 37'; Khuiklang 43'

Umpires:
Chen Jianjun (CHN)
Binish Hayat (PAK)

4 October 2016
17:00

Indonesia	0–16	Uzbekistan
	Report	Hasanboeva 3', 69', 70+'; K. Adizova 15'; Berdieva 18', 24', 31', 34', 54'; S. Adizova 22', 37', 40'; Egamberdieva 28', 63', 67'; Adambaeva 60'

Umpires:
Binish Hayat (PAK)
Supannee Yimnual (THA)

5 October 2016
15:00

Uzbekistan	0–2	Chinese Taipei
	Report	Liao Pei-Shan 26'; Su Pei Ling 42'

Umpires:
Chen Jianjun (CHN)
Cookie Tan (SGP)

5 October 2016
19:00

Sri Lanka	0–5	Thailand
	Report	Sakulpithak 26', 34'; Samanso 42'; Sanpoung 56'; Wongkeaw 63'

Umpires:
Junko Wagatsuma (JPN)
Tang Shi Him (HKG)

6 October 2016
17:00

Chinese Taipei	4–1	Sri Lanka
Liao Pei-Shan 31', 67'; Yang Chia Yu 34', 41'	Report	Konnasingha 70+'

Umpires:
Tang Shi Him (HKG)
Binish Hayat (PAK)

6 October 2016
19:00

Thailand	16–0	Indonesia
Sakulpithak 5', 18', 22', 25', 28', 57', 59', 61'; Sanpoung 11'; Aunjai 14', 66'; Khuiklang 27'; Samanso 40'; Sareesuk 45'; Watcharoen 54'; Jantapet 55'	Report

Umpires:
Cookie Tan (SGP)
Dinesha Perera (SRI)

=== Pool B ===
Pos	Team	Pld	W	D	L	GF	GA	GD	Pts	Qualification
1	Singapore	3	2	1	0	18	2	+16	7	Semi-finals
2	Pakistan	3	1	2	0	13	2	+11	5	Semi-finals
3	Hong Kong	3	1	1	1	14	3	+11	4	
4	Cambodia	3	0	0	3	0	38	−38	0	

Source: FIH
Rules for classification: 1) points; 2) matches won; 3) goal difference; 4) goals for; 5) head-to-head result; 6) field goals for.

1 October 2016
19:00

Singapore	15–0	Cambodia
Abdull 10', 30', 32', 58'; T. Ong 12', 53'; Ibrahim 14'; J. Ong 24', 37', 51', 64', 69'; Toh 34', 46', 49'	Report

Umpires:
Chen Jianjun (CHN)
Supannee Yimnual (THA)

2 October 2016
15:00

Hong Kong	1–1	Pakistan
Chan 9'	Report	Sabir FG'

Umpires:
Chen Jianjun (CHN)
Dinesha Perera (SRI)

3 October 2016
17:00

Pakistan	11–0	Cambodia
Abbas 8', 35'; Noureen 11'; Pervaiz 18'; Kanwal 25'; Sabir 33', 44', 52', 53', 69'; Shahzadi 59'	Report

Umpires:
Dinesha Perera (SRI)
Jongjit Boonmee (THA)

4 October 2016
19:00

Singapore	2–1	Hong Kong
Chua 42'; Abdull 48'	Report	Lau 39'

Umpires:
Junko Wagatsuma (JPN)
Chen Jianjun (CHN)

5 October 2016
17:00

Hong Kong	12–0	Cambodia
Lo 3', 14', 56', 64', 68', 70+'; Chan Ching 17'; T. Chan 20', 29', 41'; Lau 35'	Report

Umpires:
Dinesha Perera (SRI)
Jongjit Boonmee (THA)

6 October 2016
15:00

Pakistan	1–1	Singapore
Moureen 33'	Report	Chan 59'

Umpires:
Junko Wagatsuma (JPN)
Supannee Yimnual (THA)

== Classification round ==
=== Fifth to ninth place classification ===
==== Bracket ====
Ninth place
8 October
Cambodia	3
Indonesia	0

Seventh place
9 October
Cambodia	0
Uzbekistan	12

==== Ninth place game ====
8 October 2016
09:00

Cambodia	3–0	Indonesia
Nika 6'; Khath 35', 38'	Report

Umpires:
Tang Shi Him (HKG)
Jongjit Boonmee (THA)

==== Seventh place game ====
9 October 2016
09:00

Cambodia	0–12	Uzbekistan
	Report	Berdieva 17', 19', 26', 47', 53', 59', 64', 70'; S. Adizova 38'; Hasanboeva 55'; Egamberdieva 61'; K. Adizova 67'

Umpires:
Supannee Yimnual (THA)
Jongjit Boonmee (THA)

==== Fifth place game ====
9 October 2016
14:00

Sri Lanka	1–2	Hong Kong
Jayaneththi 19'	Report	Lo 40'; Chan 52'

Umpires:
Cookie Tan (SGP)
Binish Hayat (PAK)

=== First to fourth place classification ===
==== Bracket ====
Semi-finals
8 October
Thailand	5
Pakistan	1
8 October
Singapore	1
Chinese Taipei	0

Final
9 October
Thailand	4
Singapore	0
Third place
9 October
Pakistan	1
Chinese Taipei	4

==== Semi-finals ====
8 October 2016
15:00

Thailand	5–1	Pakistan
Sanpoung 14'; Aunjai 21'; Sakulpithak 51', 58'; Samanso 65'	Report	Shahzadi 28'

Umpires:
Cookie Tan (SGP)
Dinesha Perera (SRI)

8 October 2016
17:30

Singapore	1–0	Chinese Taipei
Chan 68'	Report

Umpires:
Junko Wagatsuma (JPN)
Chen Jianjun (CHN)

==== Third place game ====
9 October 2016
16:30

Pakistan	1–4	Chinese Taipei
Arshad 32'	Report	Yang Yu 3'; Yang Hua 10', 35'; Liao 47'

Umpires:
Chen Jianjun (CHN)
Dinesha Perera (SRI)

==== Final ====
9 October 2016
19:00

Thailand	4–0	Singapore
Sanpoung 17', 57', 67'; Aunjai 43'	Report

Umpires:
Junko Wagatsuma (JPN)
Tang Shi Him (HKG)

== Final standings ==
Pos	Team	Qualification
1	Thailand (H)	2017 Asia Cup
2	Singapore	2017 Asia Cup
3	Chinese Taipei	
4	Pakistan	
5	Hong Kong	
6	Sri Lanka	
7	Uzbekistan	
8	Cambodia	
9	Indonesia	

Source: FIH
(H) Host

== See also ==
- 2016 Men's AHF Cup
