= Indonesian Hockey Association =

Governing body of Field Hockey, Indoor Hocley and Hockey5 in Indonesia

Indonesian Hockey Federation
- Sport: Field Hockey, Indoor Hockey & Hockey5
- Jurisdiction: Indonesia
- Abbreviation: FHI
- Founded: 24 October 2009
- Affiliation: FIH
- Regional affiliation: AHF
- Headquarters: Jakarta
- President: Maj. Gen. (Ret.) Budi Sulistijono
- Secretary: Yasser Arafat Suaidy
- Men's coach: Dhaarma Raj
- Women's coach: Dhaarma Raj
- (Indonesia)

The Indonesian Hockey Federation (Pengurus Pusat Federasi Hockey Indonesia) is the governing body of Field Hockey, Indoor Hockey and Hockey5 in Indonesia. It is affiliated to FIH (International Hockey Federation) and AHF (Asian Hockey Federation). The headquarter of the federation is in Jakarta.

Maj. Gen. (Ret.) Budi Sulistijono is the President of the Indonesian Hockey Federation and Mr. Yasser Arafat Suady is the Secretary General.

== See also ==
- Indonesia men's national field hockey team
- Indonesia women's national field hockey team
