= Uzbekistan Hockey Federation =

Organization governing field hockey in Uzbekistan

- Sport: Field hockey
- Jurisdiction: Uzbekistan
- Affiliation: FIH
- Regional affiliation: AHF
- President: Bakhodir Akhmedov
- Secretary: Sunnatulla Yuldashev
- Men's coach: Okhunjon Mirzakarimov
- Women's coach: Liliya Mutalapova
- (Uzbekistan)

The Uzbekistan Hockey Federation is the governing body of field hockey in Uzbekistan. It is affiliated with the International Hockey Federation (IHF) and Asian Hockey Federation (AHF). The headquarters of the federation are in Tashkent.

Bakhodir Akhmedov is the President of the Uzbekistan Hockey Federation and Sunnatulla Yuldashev is the General Secretary.

== See also ==
- Uzbekistan men's national field hockey team
- Uzbekistan women's national field hockey team
