= Thailand Hockey Association =

Governing body of field hockey in Thailand

- Sport: Field hockey
- Jurisdiction: Thailand
- Affiliation: FIH
- Regional affiliation: AHF
- President: Chaiyapak Siriwat
- Secretary: Chanchaiyos Audsuwe
- Men's coach: Kim Kyung Soo
- Women's coach: Bae Young Wook
- (Thailand)

The Thailand Hockey Association is the governing body of field hockey in Thailand. It is affiliated to IHF International Hockey Federation and AHF Asian Hockey Federation. The headquarters of the federation are in Bangkok.

Chaiyapak Siriwat is the President of the Thailand Hockey Association and Chanchaiyos Audsuwe is the Secretary.

== See also ==
- Thailand men's national field hockey team
- Thailand women's national field hockey team
