= Korea Hockey Association =

Governing body of field hockey in South Korea

- Sport: Field hockey
- Jurisdiction: South Korea
- Founded: July 10, 1947
- Affiliation: FIH
- Regional affiliation: AHF
- President: Lee Sang-hyun
- Secretary: Park Shin Heum
- Men's coach: Shin Seok-kyo
- Women's coach: Han Jin-su

Official website
- www.koreahockey.co.kr
- (South Korea)

The Korea Hockey Association is the governing body of field hockey in South Korea. It is affiliated to IHF International Hockey Federation and AHF Asian Hockey Federation. The headquarters of the federation are in Seoul, South Korea.

Lee Sang-hyun is the President of the Korea Hockey Association and Park Shin Heum is the General Secretary.

== See also ==
- South Korea men's national field hockey team
- South Korea women's national field hockey team
