= Chinese Hockey Association =

Field hockey governing body in China

- Sport: Field hockey
- Jurisdiction: China
- Founded: May 11, 1981
- Affiliation: FIH
- Regional affiliation: AHF
- President: Jun Lei
- Secretary: Weifeng Zong
- Women's coach: Alyson Annan

Official website
- hockey.sport.org.cn
- (China)

The Chinese Hockey Association is the governing body of field hockey in People's Republic of China. It is affiliated to IHF International Hockey Federation and AHF Asian Hockey Federation. The headquarters of the federation are in Beijing, China.

Jun Lei is the President of the Chinese Hockey Association and Weifeng Zong is the General Secretary.

== See also ==
- China men's national field hockey team
- China women's national field hockey team
