= 2024 AHF Women's Central Asia Cup =

Tournament details
- Host country: Uzbekistan
- City: Andijan
- Dates: 26 February – 2 March
- Teams: 3 (from 1 confederation)
- Venue: Khalklar Dustligi Stadium Andijan

Final positions
- Champions: Kazakhstan (1st title)
- Runner-up: Uzbekistan
- Third place: Tajikistan

Tournament statistics
- Matches played: 4
- Goals scored: 34 (8.5 per match)
- Top scorer: (Uzbekistan) Zulfiyakhon Khasanboeva (9 goals)

The 2024 AHF Women's Central Asia Cup was the second edition of the AHF Women's Central Asia Cup, the international women's field hockey championship of Central Asia. It was held in Andijan, Uzbekistan from 26 February to 2 March 2024.

== Teams ==
The following three teams, participated in the tournament.

- Kazakhstan
- Tajikistan
- Uzbekistan

== Results ==
All times are local (UTC+5).

=== Standings ===
Pos	Team	Pld	W	D	L	GF	GA	GD	Pts
1	Uzbekistan (H)	2	1	1	0	16	1	+15	4
2	Kazakhstan	2	1	1	0	14	2	+12	4
3	Tajikistan	2	0	0	2	1	28	−27	0

Source: FIH
Rules for classification: 1) points; 2) matches won; 3) goal difference; 4) goals for; 5) head-to-head result; 6) field goals scored.
(H) Hosts

26 February 2024
12:30

Kazakhstan	13–1	Tajikistan
Lobanova 6', 7', 17', 58', 59'; Bolganbayeva 12', 32'; Nigmetzhanova 15'; Berdenova 27', 36', 39'; Beisenbay 37'; Bissirova 59'	Report	Fayzuloeva 52'

Umpires:
Deepa (IND)
Adolatkhon Vakhabova (UZB)

28 February 2024
15:30

Uzbekistan	1–1	Kazakhstan
Khasanova 34'	Report	Bissirova 25'

Umpires:
Deepa (IND)
Khalid Hussain (HKG)

1 March 2024
15:30

Tajikistan	0–15	Uzbekistan
	Report	Khasanboeva 3', 17', 27', 36', 42', 44', 50', 51'; Khasanova 3'; Zaripova 14', 35'; Ramazonova 31', 45', 51'; Khujaeva 42'

Umpires:
Assel Mukasheva (KAZ)
Nurzhan Mukhamadiyev (KAZ)

== Final Match ==
2 March 2024
15:30

Uzbekistan	1–2	Kazakhstan
Khasanboeva 33'	Report	Lyapina 14', 45'

Umpires:
Deepa (IND)
Hussain Al Hasani (OMA)
