= Katherine Mountain =

Hong Kong field hockey player

Personal information
- Born: 26 December 1986 (age 39) Hong Kong

Sport
- Sport: Field hockey
- Club: Hong Kong Football Club
Senior career
Years	Team	Caps	Goals
2002 - 2004, 2007 - 2010	Hong Kong Football Club	-	-
2004 - 2007	University of Birmingham	-	-
2010 - 2014	Dubai Hockey Club	-	-
2016 - 2018	Singapore Cricket Club	-	-
Medal record
Women's field hockey
Representing Hong Kong
Women’s AHF Cup
Silver medal – second place	2012
Gold medal – first place	2003

Katherine Mountain (born 26 December 1986), also known as Katy Mountain, is a Hong Kong field hockey player who plays midfield for the Hong Kong women's national field hockey team and Hong Kong Football Club. She has over 60 caps for Hong Kong.

== Early life and education ==
Mountain was born and raised in Hong Kong. She completed her primary education at Peak School and then enrolled at Island School. Mountain began playing hockey at Island School where she captained the school team and joined the junior Hong Kong field hockey development programme. During high school she was named captain of the Hong Kong U14, U16, U18 teams. After high school, she went to the University of Birmingham, where she graduated with a Bachelor of Commerce (B.Com.). At university she continued to represent Hong Kong at field hockey.

== International career ==
Mountain has over 60 caps for Hong Kong and captained the U21 Hong Kong women's national field hockey team. She has played at numerous international tournaments including two Asian Games, two Women's Hockey Asia Cups, two East Asian Games, and two Women's AHF Cups. She won a gold medal at the 2003 Women's AHF Cup at the age of 16 and a silver medal at the 2012 Women's AHF Cup.

== Domestic career ==
She currently plays club hockey for Hong Kong Football Club in the Women's Hong Kong Premier Division. Mountain joined Hong Kong Football Club when she was 15 years old and at the age of 20 she captained the team for two back-to-back seasons (2007/2008, 2008/2009), winning both the premier division title and knock-out cup competition. She has won six premier division titles and knock-out cup competitions with Hong Kong Football Club.

From 2016 to 2018, Mountain played hockey for Singapore Cricket Club and captained the team to win the premier division in 2017. Mountain has also played hockey for the University of Birmingham.
