= Women's AHF Cup =

- Most recent season or competition: 2025 Women's AHF Cup
- Sport: Field hockey
- Founded: 1997; 29 years ago
- First season: 1997
- Confederation: AHF (Asia)
- Most recent champion: Singapore (1st title) (2025)
- Most titles: Chinese Taipei; Hong Kong; Kazakhstan; Thailand; Singapore (1 title)

The Women's AHF Cup is a quadrennial international women's field hockey competition in Asia organized by the Asian Hockey Federation. The tournament was founded in 1997 and serves as a qualification tournament for the next Women's Asia Cup.

== Results ==
#	Year	Host	Final			Third place match			Teams
#	Year	Host	Winner	Score	Runner-up	Third place	Score	Fourth place	Teams
1	1997; Details	Singapore	Kazakhstan	2–1	Singapore	Malaysia	?–?	Sri Lanka	6
2	2003; Details	Singapore	Hong Kong	3–2	Sri Lanka	Singapore	6–0	Pakistan	5
-	2008	Sri Lanka	Not held			Not held			-
3	2012; Details	Singapore	Chinese Taipei	2–1	Hong Kong	Thailand	6–3	Sri Lanka	6
4	2016; Details	Bangkok, Thailand	Thailand	4–0	Singapore	Chinese Taipei	4–1	Pakistan	9
5	2025; Details	Jakarta, Indonesia	Singapore	1–1 (3–2 s.o.)	Chinese Taipei	Hong Kong	2–2 (3–2 s.o.)	Indonesia	6

== Summary ==
Team	Winners	Runners-up	Third places	Fourth places
Singapore	1 (2025)	2 (1997*, 2016)	1 (2003*)	
Hong Kong	1 (2003)	1 (2012)	1 (2025)	
Chinese Taipei	1 (2012)	1 (2025)	1 (2016)	
Thailand	1 (2016*)		1 (2012)	
Kazakhstan	1 (1997)			
Sri Lanka		1 (2003)		2 (1997, 2012)
Malaysia			1 (1997)	
Pakistan				2 (2003, 2016)
Indonesia				1 (2025*)

* = hosts

== Team appearances ==
Nation	(Singapore) 1997	(Singapore) 2003	(Singapore) 2012	(Thailand) 2016	(Indonesia) 2025	Total
Cambodia	–	–	–	8th	–	1
Chinese Taipei	5th	–	1st	3rd	2nd	4
Hong Kong	6th	1st	2nd	5th	3rd	5
Indonesia	–	–	–	9th	4th	2
Kazakhstan	1st	–	–	–	WD	1
Malaysia	3rd	–	–	–	–	1
Nepal	–	–	–	–	WD	0
Pakistan	–	4th	6th	4th	–	3
Singapore	2nd	3rd	5th	2nd	1st	5
Sri Lanka	4th	2nd	4th	6th	5th	5
Thailand	–	5th	3rd	1st	–	3
Uzbekistan	–	–	–	7th	6th	2
Total (12)	6	5	6	9	6	

== See also ==
- Men's AHF Cup
- Women's Hockey Asia Cup
- Women's Junior AHF Cup
