= Field hockey at the 2013 East Asian Games =

- Venue: Tianjin Olympic Center
- Dates: 6 October 2013 – 13 October 2013
- Competitors: 128 from 6 nations

Champions
- Men: South Korea
- Women: Japan

Field hockey at the 2013 East Asian Games in Tianjin took place from 6 to 13 October at the Tianjin Olympic Center.

== Competition schedule ==
The men's and women's tournaments were held simultaneously. The schedule was as follows:

G	Group stage	B	Bronze-medal match	F	Final

Date Event	Sun 6	Mon 7	Tue 8	Wed 9	Thu 10	Fri 11	Sat 12		Sun 13	
Men		G		G		G			B	F
Women	G		G		G		B	F		

== Teams ==
In addition to the host nation, China, three teams competed in both the men's and women's tournaments. The participating nations are as follows.

Men's teams

- China
- Hong Kong
- Japan
- South Korea

Women's teams

- China
- Chinese Taipei
- Hong Kong
- Japan

== Men's competition ==
The competition consisted of two stages; a group stage followed by classification matches.

=== Group stage ===
The four nations competed in a single round-robin format to determine group standings.

Pos	Team	Pld	W	D	L	GF	GA	GD	Pts	Qualification
1	South Korea	3	3	0	0	14	3	+11	9	Final
2	Japan	3	2	0	1	5	4	+1	6	Final
3	China (H)	3	1	0	2	12	6	+6	3	
4	Hong Kong	3	0	0	3	2	20	−18	0	

Source: FIH
Rules for classification: 1) points; 2) goal difference; 3) goals scored; 4) head-to-head result.
(H) Hosts

=== Classification matches ===
==== Bronze-medal match ====
13 October 2013
12:00

China	6–0	Hong Kong

==== Gold-medal match ====
13 October 2013
14:30

South Korea	2–1	Japan

== Women's competition ==
The competition consisted of two stages; a group stage followed by classification matches.

=== Group stage ===
The four nations competed in a single round-robin format to determine group standings.

Pos	Team	Pld	W	D	L	GF	GA	GD	Pts	Qualification
1	Japan	3	2	1	0	23	1	+22	7	Final
2	China (H)	3	2	1	0	19	1	+18	7	Final
3	Chinese Taipei	3	1	0	2	4	17	−13	3	
4	Hong Kong	3	0	0	3	2	29	−27	0	

Source: FIH
Rules for classification: 1) points; 2) goal difference; 3) goals scored; 4) head-to-head result.
(H) Hosts

=== Classification matches ===
==== Bronze-medal match ====
12 October 2013
12:00

Chinese Taipei	4–2	Hong Kong

==== Gold-medal match ====
12 October 2013
14:30

Japan	4–3	China

== Medal summary ==
=== Medal table ===
* Host nation (China)

Rank	Nation	Gold	Silver	Bronze	Total
1	Japan (JPN)	1	1	0	2
2	South Korea (KOR)	1	0	0	1
3	China (CHN)*	0	1	1	2
4	Chinese Taipei (TPE)	0	0	1	1
Totals (4 entries)		2	2	2	6
