= Uzbekistan women's national field hockey team =

Uzbekistan
- Association: Uzbekistan Hockey Federation
- Confederation: AHF (Asia)
- Head Coach: Pavel Habryneuski
- Captain: Gulrukh Ramazonova

FIH ranking
- Current: 66 ▼1 (3 October 2026)

Asian Games
- Appearances: 3 (first in 1994)
- Best result: 5th (1994, 1998)

Asia Cup
- Appearances: 1 (first in 1993)
- Best result: 5th (1993)

The Uzbekistan women's national field hockey team represents Uzbekistan in women's international field hockey competitions and is controlled by the Uzbekistan Hockey Federation, the governing body for field hockey in Uzbekistan.

== Tournament record ==
=== Asian Games ===
- 1994 – 5th place
- 1998 – 5th place
- 2022 – Withdrew
- 2026 – 12th place

Asian Games (1994–2026) history
Year	Round	Score	Result
1994	Round Robin	South Korea 4–0 Uzbekistan	Loss
1994	Round Robin	China 0–0 Uzbekistan	Draw
1994	Round Robin	India 1–1 Uzbekistan	Draw
1994	Round Robin	Japan 1–0 Uzbekistan	Loss
1994	Round Robin	Uzbekistan 6–0 Singapore	Win
1998	Round Robin	Japan 2–1 Uzbekistan	Loss
1998	Round Robin	China 4–1 Uzbekistan	Loss
1998	Round Robin	Uzbekistan 0–0 Kazakhstan	Draw
1998	Round Robin	India 2–1 Uzbekistan	Loss
1998	Round Robin	South Korea 5–0 Uzbekistan	Loss
1998	Round Robin	Uzbekistan 2–0 Thailand	Win
1998	5th place game	Uzbekistan 5–2 Kazakhstan	Win
2026	Group stage	India 19–0 Uzbekistan	Loss
2026	Group stage	Uzbekistan 1–3 Thailand	Loss
2026	Group stage	Uzbekistan 1–7 Japan	Loss
2026	Group stage	Singapore 3–1 Uzbekistan	Loss
2026	Group stage	Indonesia 1–2 Uzbekistan	Win
2026	11th place match	Kazakhstan 1–1 (4–2 s.o.) Uzbekistan	Draw

=== Asia Cup ===
- 1993 – 5th place

=== AHF Cup ===
- 2016 – 7th place
- 2025 – 6th place

=== AHF Central Asia Cup ===
- 2024 – (silver)
- 2025 – (silver)

== Current squad ==
The following is the Uzbekistan roster in the women's field hockey tournament of the 2026 Asian Games.

Head Coach:

1. Rushana Chorieva (GK)
2. Ugiloy Fakhriddinova
3. Irina Semyonova (C)
6. Mutabar Amrieva
7. Madinabonu Khujaeva
8. Zulkhumor Khaydarova
9. Fotima Abduganieva
10. Mariya Demina
11. Parvina Fayzillaeva
12. Zulfiyakhon Khaytboeva
13. Yuliya Yubko
15. Shahzoda Zaripova
16. Marjona Mamatmurodova
17. Mekhrangiz Abdugaforova
19. Noilakhon Khakimova
44. Aziza Akhmedova (GK)
66. Nurkhayot Odilova
77. Roziyakhon Soyibjonova

== Results and fixtures ==
The following is a list of match results in the last 12 months, as well as any future matches that have been scheduled.

Win Draw Loss Fixture

=== 2026 ===
==== 2026 Asian Games Women's Qualifier ====
23 April 2026 Pool A	Hong Kong	5–0; Forfeit	Uzbekistan	Jakarta, Indonesia
12:30		Report	Yubko 3', 40'; Semyonova 10', 39'	Stadium: GBK Hockey Field

24 April 2026 Pool A	Uzbekistan	2–3	Bangladesh	Jakarta, Indonesia
12:30	Khujaeva 12'; Khaydarova 46'	Report	Rimon 11'; Akter 24'; Riya 40'	Stadium: GBK Hockey Field

26 April 2026 Pool A	Uzbekistan	3–3	Chinese Taipei	Jakarta, Indonesia
20:00	Khaydarova 25'; Demina 39'; Semyonova 60'	Report	Mao 5'; Fan 37'; Lai 48'	Stadium: GBK Hockey Field

28 April 2026 5/8 Classification	Sri Lanka	1–6	Uzbekistan	Jakarta, Indonesia
12:30	Kaluarachchi 28'	Report	Demina 30', 30', 38', 45'; Yubko 31'; Semyonova 49'	Stadium: GBK Hockey Field

29 April 2026 5/6 Classification	Kazakhstan	1–1 (2–0 p)	Uzbekistan	Jakarta, Indonesia
15:00	Lobanova 26'	Report	Khujaeva 51'	Stadium: GBK Hockey Field
	Penalties
	Gataulina (penalty shoot-out missed); Domashneva (penalty shoot-out scored); Lyapina (penalty shoot-out scored)		(penalty shoot-out missed) Demina; (penalty shoot-out missed) Yubko; (penalty shoot-out missed) Khaydarova; (penalty shoot-out missed) Khujaeva

==== 2026 Asian Games ====
20 September 2026 Pool B	India	19–0	Uzbekistan	Kakamigahara, Japan
11:00	Lalremsiami 7'; Deepika 8', 22', 25', 33', 36', 38', 41', 54'; Ishika 11', 42', 54'; Baljeet 12'; Neha 18'; Navneet 23', 45'; Lalthantluangi 43', 51'; Rana 43'	Report		Stadium: Gifu Prefectural Green Stadium

21 September 2026 Pool B	Uzbekistan	1–3	Thailand	Kakamigahara, Japan
15:00	Khujaeva 17'	Report	Konthong 10'; Inpa 26'; Jirapitisatja 40'	Stadium: Gifu Prefectural Green Stadium

23 September 2026 Pool B	Uzbekistan	1–7	Japan	Kakamigahara, Japan
17:00	Yubko 8'	Report	Kobayakawa 1', 38', 50'; Toriyama 15', 58'; Kawaguchi 20'; Suzuki 27'	Stadium: Gifu Prefectural Green Stadium

25 September 2026 Pool B	Singapore	3–1	Uzbekistan	Kakamigahara, Japan
17:00	Sim 39'; Chia 47'; J. Ng 48'	Report	Yubko 37'	Stadium: Gifu Prefectural Green Stadium

27 September 2026 Pool B	Indonesia	1–2	Uzbekistan	Kakamigahara, Japan
11:00	Maulani 58'	Report	Amrieva 3'; Semyonova 47'	Stadium: Gifu Prefectural Green Stadium

30 September 2026 11th place match	Kazakhstan	1–1 (4–2 p)	Uzbekistan	Kakamigahara, Japan
09:00	Lobanova 9'	Report	Demina 33'	Stadium: Gifu Prefectural Green Stadium
	Penalties
	Gataulina (penalty shoot-out scored); Gataulina (penalty shoot-out scored); Lobanova (penalty shoot-out scored); Domashneva (penalty shoot-out scored)		(penalty shoot-out scored) Demina; (penalty shoot-out scored) Khaytboeva; (penalty shoot-out missed) Semyonova; (penalty shoot-out missed) Zaripova

== See also ==
- Uzbekistan men's national field hockey team
