= Aimi Kobayashi (field hockey) =

Japanese field hockey player

Personal information
- Born: 25 November 1998 (age 27) Tottori Prefecture, Japan
- Height: 152 cm (5 ft 0 in)
- Weight: 52 kg (115 lb)

Sport
- Sport: Field hockey
- Position: Forward
Senior career
Years	Team	Caps	Goals
–	Sony HC	-	-
National team
Years	Team	Caps	Goals
2023–	Japan	13	(5)
Medal record
Women's field hockey
Representing Japan
Asian Champions Trophy
Silver medal – second place	2023 Ranchi	Team
Girls' Asia Cup
Silver medal – second place	2016 Bangkok

Aimi Kobayashi (小林 愛実, born 25 November 1998) is a Japanese field hockey player.

== Personal life ==
Aimi Kobayashi was born in the Tottori Prefecture.

== Career ==
=== Domestic league ===
In the Japanese national league, Kobayashi represents the Sony HC Bravia Ladies.

=== Cherry Blossoms ===
Kobayashi made her senior international debut in 2023. She represented the team at the Asian Games in Hangzhou. She followed this up with an appearance at the 2023 Asian Champions Trophy in Ranchi, where she won a silver medal.

She was named in the squad for the 2024 FIH Olympic Qualifiers in Ranchi.
