= Iran men's national field hockey team =

National field hockey team of Iran

Iran
- Nickname(s): Team Melli
- Association: Hockey Federation of I.R. Iran
- Head Coach: Rajab Nourani
Home	Away

FIH ranking
- Current: 92 (18 June 2026)
- Highest: 51 (November 2015 – August 2016)
- Lowest: 77 (June 2019)

Asian Games
- Appearances: 1 (first in 1974)
- Best result: 6th (1974)

Asia Cup
- Appearances: 1 (first in 1985)
- Best result: 10th (1985)

The Iran men's national field hockey team is the national field hockey team of Iran. It is governed by the Hockey Federation of the Islamic Republic of Iran.

== History ==
Iran took part as hosts in the 1974 Asian Games where Iran occupied the sixth and last place losing to eventual champions Pakistan 13–0.

Iran also took part in the 1985 Asia Cup held in Dhaka, Bangladesh where Iran came last in the 10-nation event again suffering a heavy 16–0 defeat at the hands of again eventual winners Pakistan.

More recently Iran has enjoyed success at the indoor event, winning Indoor Hockey Asia Cup on four occasions and also participated at 2011 Men's Indoor Hockey World Cup and 2015 Men's Indoor Hockey World Cup. In 2015 Men's World Cup, Iran made a history and advanced to semifinals by hammering Russia 8–5. In semifinals, it lost the game to Austria and Germany and finished the tournament in 4th place.

== Field Hockey Results ==
=== World League ===
Year	Rank	M	W	D	L	GF	GA	GD
2012-13	Did Not Compete							
2014-15	39th place	3	1	1	1	10	4	+6
2016-17	Did Not Compete							
Total	1/3	3	1	1	1	10	4	+6

=== Asian Games ===
Year	Rank	M	W	D	L	GF	GA	GD
(Japan) 1958	Did Not Compete							
(Indonesia) 1962	Did Not Compete							
(Thailand) 1966	Did Not Compete							
(Thailand) 1970	Did Not Compete							
(Iran) 1974	6th place	5	0	0	5	1	52	-51
(Thailand) 1978	Did Not Compete							
(India) 1982	Did Not Compete							
(South Korea) 1986	Did Not Compete							
(China) 1990	Did Not Compete							
(Japan) 1994	Did Not Compete							
(Thailand) 1998	Did Not Compete							
(South Korea) 2002	Did Not Compete							
(Qatar) 2006	Did Not Qualify							
(China) 2010	Did Not Compete							
(South Korea) 2014	Qualified / Withdraw							
(Indonesia) 2018	Did Not Compete							
(China) 2022	Did Not Compete							
Total	1/17	5	0	0	5	1	52	-51

=== Asian Cup ===
Year	Rank	M	W	D	L	GF	GA	GD
(Pakistan) 1982	Did Not Compete							
(Bangladesh) 1985	10th place	4	0	0	4	2	33	-31
(India) 1989	Did Not Compete							
(Japan) 1993	Did Not Compete							
(Malaysia) 1999	Did Not Compete							
(Malaysia) 2003	Did Not Qualify							
(India) 2007	Did Not Compete							
(Malaysia) 2009	Did Not Compete							
(Malaysia) 2013	Did Not Compete							
(Bangladesh) 2017	Did Not Compete							
(Indonesia) 2022	Did Not Qualify							
(India) 2025	Did Not Compete							
Total	1/12	4	0	0	4	2	33	-31

=== AHF Cup ===
Year	Rank	M	W	D	L	GF	GA	GD
(Hong Kong) 1997	Did Not Compete							
(Hong Kong) 2002	5th place	6	2	0	4	4	11	-7
(Singapore) 2008	Did Not Compete							
(Thailand) 2012	Did Not Compete							
(Hong Kong) 2016	Did Not Compete							
(Indonesia) 2022	6th place	6	1	1	4	9	29	-20
(Indonesia) 2025	Did Not Compete							
Total	2/7	12	3	1	8	13	40	-27

=== West Asian Cup ===
Year	Rank	M	W	D	L	GF	GA	GD
(Qatar) 2014	Champions	2	1	1	0	4	2	+2
Total	1/1	2	1	1	0	4	2	+2

== Indoor Hockey Results ==
=== World Cup ===
Year	Rank	M	W	D	L	GF	GA	GD
(Germany) 2003	Did Not Compete							
(Austria) 2007	Did Not Compete							
(Poland) 2011	9th place	6	3	0	3	28	27	+1
(Germany) 2015	4th place	8	2	1	5	38	61	-23
(Germany) 2018	Third place	8	4	3	1	30	21	+9
(South Africa) 2023	Third place	8	2	4	2	42	41	+1
(Croatia) 2025	7th place	6	3	0	3	17	30	-13
Total	5/7	36	14	8	14	155	180	-25

=== Asian Cup ===
Year	Rank	M	W	D	L	GF	GA	GD
(Malaysia) 2008	Champions	6	6	0	0	47	5	+42
(Malaysia) 2009	Champions	5	5	0	0	16	4	+12
(Malaysia) 2010	Champions	6	6	0	0	53	5	+48
(Thailand) 2012	Champions	7	7	0	0	104	4	+100
(Taiwan) 2014	Champions	5	5	0	0	56	6	+50
(Kazakhstan) 2015	Champions	6	6	0	0	93	9	+84
(Qatar) 2017	Champions	5	5	0	0	52	9	+43
(Thailand) 2019	Champions	6	6	0	0	56	6	+50
(Thailand) 2022	Runners-up	7	6	1	0	47	13	+34
(Kazakhstan) 2024	Champions	6	5	1	0	70	11	+59
Total	10/10	59	57	2	0	594	72	+522

- The results of the two 2009 matches against Malaysia (in the preliminary round) and Thailand are unknown.
- The 2008 results include the match against Malaysia B (won 5–1).
- The 2009 results include the match against Malaysia B (won 6–1).
- The 2012 results include the match against Thailand B (won 21–0).
- The 2015 results include the match against Kazakhstan B (won 13–1).

=== Asian Indoor Games ===
Year	Rank	M	W	D	L	GF	GA	GD
(Macau) 2007	Champions	6	5	1	0	35	9	+26
Total	1/1	6	5	1	0	35	9	+26
