= 2025 Women's AHF Cup =

Field hockey qualification tournament

Tournament details
- Host country: Indonesia
- City: Jakarta
- Dates: 18–27 April
- Teams: 6 (from 1 confederation)
- Venue: GBK Hockey Field

Final positions
- Champions: Singapore (1st title)
- Runner-up: Chinese Taipei
- Third place: Hong Kong

Tournament statistics
- Matches played: 18
- Goals scored: 73 (4.06 per match)
- Top scorer: (Hong Kong) Pui Sze Lau (9 goals)

The 2025 Women's AHF Cup was the fifth edition of the Women's AHF Cup, the quadrennial field hockey qualification tournament for the Women's Hockey Asia Cup organized by the Asian Hockey Federation. It was held alongside the men's tournament at the GBK Hockey Field in Jakarta, Indonesia from 18 to 27 April 2025. This marked the second time Indonesia hosting the tournament.

Singapore won the tournament for the first time by defeating Chinese Taipei 3–2 in a shoot-out after the match finished 1–1. As the top two teams they secured qualification for the 2025 Women's Asia Cup.

== Teams ==
- Hong Kong
- Indonesia
- ~~Kazakhstan~~
- ~~Nepal~~
- Singapore
- Sri Lanka
- Chinese Taipei
- Uzbekistan

== Preliminary round ==
All times are local (UTC+7).

=== Standings ===
Pos	Team	Pld	W	D	L	GF	GA	GD	Pts	Qualification
1	Chinese Taipei	5	4	0	1	15	5	+10	12	Final
2	Singapore	5	3	1	1	17	9	+8	10	Final
3	Hong Kong	5	2	2	1	13	6	+7	8	Third place match
4	Indonesia (H)	5	1	3	1	5	5	0	6	Third place match
5	Sri Lanka	5	0	2	3	7	19	−12	2	Fifth place match
6	Uzbekistan	5	0	2	3	4	17	−13	2	Fifth place match

Source: FIH
Rules for classification: 1) points; 2) matches won; 3) goal difference; 4) goals for; 5) head-to-head result; 6) field goals for.
(H) Hosts

=== Matches ===
18 April 2025
11:00

Chinese Taipei	4–0	Uzbekistan
Wang W. 30'; Zhu 32', 56'; Fan 46'	Report

Umpires:
Dahiya Deepa (IND)
Neranji Attipola (SRI)

18 April 2025
13:00

Hong Kong	5–0	Sri Lanka
T. Chan 15'; Lau 22', 35', 56'; Chuen 42'	Report

Umpires:
Ornpimol Kittiteerasopon (THA)
Alizah Puteri (INA)

18 April 2025
15:00

Singapore	2–0	Indonesia
S. Ng 25'; N. Ong 50'	Report

Umpires:
Rinky See (HKG)
Liu Yu-Chen (TPE)

19 April 2025
11:00

Hong Kong	5–1	Uzbekistan
Lau 3', 14', 51', 58'; E. Cheung 57'	Report	Nekova 16'

Umpires:
Rahimah Abdul Aziz (SGP)
Mitra Syumanja (INA)

19 April 2025
15:00

Singapore	5–2	Sri Lanka
Ho 4'; S. Ng 7'; N. Ong 25'; Sim 29', 41'	Report	Kaluarachchi 4', 58'

Umpires:
Ornpimol Kittiteerasopon (THA)
Adolatkhon Vakhabova (UZB)

19 April 2025
19:00

Indonesia	2–0	Chinese Taipei
Natasya 11'; Aditya 41'	Report

Umpires:
Dahiya Deepa (IND)
Rinky See (HKG)

21 April 2025
09:00

Uzbekistan	2–2	Sri Lanka
Olimova 9'; Khujaeva 25'	Report	Weerabahu 38'; Fernando 50'

Umpires:
Alizah Puteri (INA)
Liu Yu-Chen (TPE)

21 April 2025
11:00

Chinese Taipei	4–2	Singapore
Fan 12'; Zhu 21'; Pu 33'; Lai 47'	Report	S. Ng 27'; J. Ng 53'

Umpires:
Ornpimol Kittiteerasopon (THA)
Neranji Attipola (SRI)

21 April 2025
17:00

Indonesia	0–0	Hong Kong
	Report

Umpires:
Dahiya Deepa (IND)
Rahimah Abdul Aziz (SGP)

22 April 2025
15:00

Uzbekistan	1–1	Indonesia
Khaydarova 53'	Report	Aditya 2'

Umpires:
Ornpimol Kittiteerasopon (THA)
Rahimah Abdul Aziz (SGP)

23 April 2025
09:00

Sri Lanka	1–5	Chinese Taipei
Fernando 35'	Report	Pu 3', 38'; Zhu 19'; Mao 34'; Ye 60'

Umpires:
Rinky See (HKG)
Mitra Syumanja (INA)

23 April 2025
11:00

Hong Kong	3–3	Singapore
McNeil 12'; E. Cheung 24'; Lau 48'	Report	S. Ng 6'; Kwek 19'; Tanandika 22'

Umpires:
Ornpimol Kittiteerasopon (THA)
Dahiya Deepa (IND)

24 April 2025
15:00

Singapore	5–0	Uzbekistan
Sim 5'; N. Ong 14'; Chia 29'; J. Ng 31'; Chan 32'	Report

Umpires:
Rinky See (HKG)
Neranji Attipola (SRI)

24 April 2025
17:00

Sri Lanka	2–2	Indonesia
Madaragoda 26'; Fernando 59'	Report	Prasasti 20'; Natasya 22'

Umpires:
Ornpimol Kittiteerasopon (THA)
Liu Yu-Chen (TPE)

24 April 2025
19:00

Chinese Taipei	2–0	Hong Kong
	Report

Umpires:
Dahiya Deepa (IND)
Rahimah Abdul Aziz (SGP)

== Classification round ==
=== Fifth and sixth place ===
26 April 2025
14:30

Sri Lanka	3–3	Uzbekistan
Madaragoda 30', 32'; Fernando 43'	Report	Olimova 9', 33'; Khaydarova 27'
Penalties
Madaragoda (penalty shoot-out scored); Weerabahu (penalty shoot-out missed); Kaluarachchi (penalty shoot-out scored); Kaburugamuwe (penalty shoot-out scored)	3–1	(penalty shoot-out missed) Adizova; (penalty shoot-out missed) Ramazonova; (penalty shoot-out scored) Olimova; (penalty shoot-out missed) Nekova; (penalty shoot-out missed) Fayzillaeva

Umpires:
Rinky See (HKG)
Alizah Puteri (INA)

=== Third and fourth place ===
27 April 2025
12:15

Hong Kong	2–2	Indonesia
Law 35'; Lau 47'	Report	Maulani 10'; Indira 59'
Penalties
Cheung (penalty shoot-out scored); Lau (penalty shoot-out scored); McNeil (penalty shoot-out missed); Chuen (penalty shoot-out scored); Chan (penalty shoot-out missed)	3–2	(penalty shoot-out missed) Maulani; (penalty shoot-out missed) Indira; (penalty shoot-out scored) Sri; (penalty shoot-out scored) Prasasti; (penalty shoot-out missed) Destian

Umpires:
Rahimah Abdul Aziz (SGP)
Liu Yu-Chen (TPE)

=== Final ===
27 April 2025
16:45

Chinese Taipei	1–1	Singapore
Lai 51'	Report	J. Ng 58'
Penalties
Fan (penalty shoot-out scored); Chang (penalty shoot-out missed); Zhu (penalty shoot-out missed); Lai (penalty shoot-out scored); Chen (penalty shoot-out missed)	2–3	(penalty shoot-out scored) S. Ng; (penalty shoot-out scored) Ong; (penalty shoot-out scored) J. Ng; (penalty shoot-out missed) Ho

Umpires:
Ornpimol Kittiteerasopon (THA)
Dahiya Deepa (IND)

== Statistics ==
=== Final standings ===
Pos	Team	Qualification
1st place, gold medalist(s)	Singapore	2025 Asia Cup
2nd place, silver medalist(s)	Chinese Taipei	2025 Asia Cup
3rd place, bronze medalist(s)	Hong Kong	
4	Indonesia (H)	
5	Sri Lanka	
6	Uzbekistan	

Source: FIH
(H) Host

=== Goalscorers ===
There were 73 goals scored in 18 matches, for an average of 4.06 goals per match.

9 goals

- (Hong Kong) Pui Sze Lau

4 goals

- (Chinese Taipei) Fan Hui-Yun
- (Chinese Taipei) Zhu Yi-Chun
- (Singapore) Sardonna Ng
- (Singapore) Valerie Sim
- (Sri Lanka) M Nipuni Fernando

3 goals

- (Chinese Taipei) Pu Agustin-Linmey
- (Singapore) Jolene Ng
- (Singapore) Nadiah Ong
- (Uzbekistan) Noilakhon Olimova

2 goals

- (Chinese Taipei) Lai Ya-Han
- (Hong Kong) Tiffany Chan
- (Hong Kong) Evelyn Cheung
- (Indonesia) Innes Aditya
- (Indonesia) Nairbohu Natasya
- (Sri Lanka) K Vimukthini Kaluarachchi
- (Sri Lanka) Shehani Madaragoda
- (Sri Lanka) Imesha Weerabahu
- (Uzbekistan) Zulkhumor Khaydarova

1 goal

- (Chinese Taipei) Mao I-Hsuan
- (Chinese Taipei) Wang Wen-Tsen
- (Chinese Taipei) Ye Shu-Qin
- (Hong Kong) Ka Law
- (Hong Kong) Kirsten McNeil
- (Indonesia) Asri Dewi Prasasti
- (Indonesia) Nisa Indira
- (Indonesia) Salma Maulani
- (Singapore) Cheryll Chia
- (Singapore) Puay Ho
- (Singapore) Xiao Kwek
- (Singapore) Phylicia Tanandika
- (Uzbekistan) Madinabonu Khujaeva
- (Uzbekistan) Dilbar Nekova

Source: FIH
