= Field hockey at the 2018 Asian Games – Women's Qualifier =

2018 Women's Asian Games Qualifier

Tournament details
- Host country: Thailand
- City: Bangkok
- Dates: 12–20 January 2018
- Teams: 7
- Venue: Queen Sirikit 60th Anniversary Stadium

Final positions
- Champions: Thailand
- Runner-up: Hong Kong
- Third place: Chinese Taipei

Tournament statistics
- Matches played: 21
- Goals scored: 67 (3.19 per match)
- Top scorer: (Thailand) Kornkanok Sanpoung (5 goals)

The qualification for the 2018 Asian Games Field hockey women's tournament was held from 12 to 20 January 2018 in Bangkok, Thailand at the Queen Sirikit 60th Anniversary Stadium.

== Results ==
Pos	Team	Pld	W	D	L	GF	GA	GD	Pts	Qualification
1	Thailand (H)	6	5	0	1	21	1	+20	15	2018 Asian Games
2	Hong Kong	6	3	2	1	11	2	+9	11	2018 Asian Games
3	Chinese Taipei	6	3	2	1	12	6	+6	11	2018 Asian Games
4	Kazakhstan	6	3	1	2	12	7	+5	10	2018 Asian Games
5	Singapore	6	3	1	2	8	5	+3	10	
6	Pakistan	6	1	0	5	3	23	−20	3	
7	Indonesia	6	0	0	6	0	23	−23	0	

Source: FIH
Rules for classification: 1) points; 2) goal difference; 3) goals scored; 4) head-to-head result.
(H) Hosts

All times are local (UTC+7).

12 January 2018
16:00

Hong Kong	3–0	Indonesia
	Report

12 January 2018
18:00

Chinese Taipei	3–0	Pakistan
	Report

12 January 2018
20:00

Thailand	1–0	Singapore
	Report

13 January 2018
16:00

Kazakhstan	6–0	Pakistan
	Report

13 January 2018
18:00

Singapore	0–2	Chinese Taipei
	Report

13 January 2018
20:00

Thailand	7–0	Indonesia
	Report

14 January 2018
16:00

Kazakhstan	1–1	Chinese Taipei
	Report

14 January 2018
18:00

Singapore	1–1	Hong Kong
	Report

14 January 2018
20:00

Thailand	7–0	Pakistan
	Report

16 January 2018
16:00

Pakistan	3–0	Indonesia
	Report

16 January 2018
18:00

Kazakhstan	0–3	Hong Kong
	Report

16 January 2018
20:00

Thailand	5–0	Chinese Taipei
	Report

17 January 2018
16:00

Singapore	3–0	Pakistan
	Report

17 January 2018
18:00

Kazakhstan	3–0	Indonesia
	Report

17 January 2018
20:00

Hong Kong	0–0	Chinese Taipei
	Report

19 January 2018
16:00

Singapore	1–0	Indonesia
	Report

19 January 2018
18:00

Hong Kong	4–0	Pakistan
	Report

19 January 2018
20:00

Thailand	0–1	Kazakhstan
	Report

20 January 2018
16:00

Chinese Taipei	6–0	Indonesia
	Report

20 January 2018
18:00

Thailand	1–0	Hong Kong
	Report

20 January 2018
20:00

Kazakhstan	1–3	Singapore
	Report
