= Cambodia women's national field hockey team =

Cambodia
- Association: Cambodian Hockey Federation
- Confederation: AHF (Asia)
- Head Coach: Rana Asif Maqsood
- Captain: Srey Sros Eng

FIH ranking
- Current: 74 ▼1 (10 March 2026)

The Cambodia women's national field hockey team represents Cambodia in international field hockey competitions.

== Tournament history ==
=== Women's AHF Cup ===
Champions Runners up Third place Fourth place

Year	Position	Pld	W	D	L	GF	GA	GD
(Thailand) 2016	8th place	3	0	0	3	0	38	-38
Total	1 Appearance	3	0	0	3	0	38	-38

=== Hockey World League ===
Champions Runners up Third place Fourth place

Year	Position	Pld	W	D	L	GF	GA	GD
(Singapore) 2016–17	8th place	6	0	0	6	0	68	-68
Total	1 Appearance	6	0	0	6	0	68	-68

=== SEA Games ===
• 2013 – 6th place

- 2023 – 5th place

== Results and fixtures ==
The following is a list of match results in the last 12 months, as well as any future matches that have been scheduled.

Win Draw Loss Fixture

== See also ==
• Cambodia men's national field hockey team
