= Gaziantep =

Metropolitan municipality in Turkey

- Metropolitan municipality
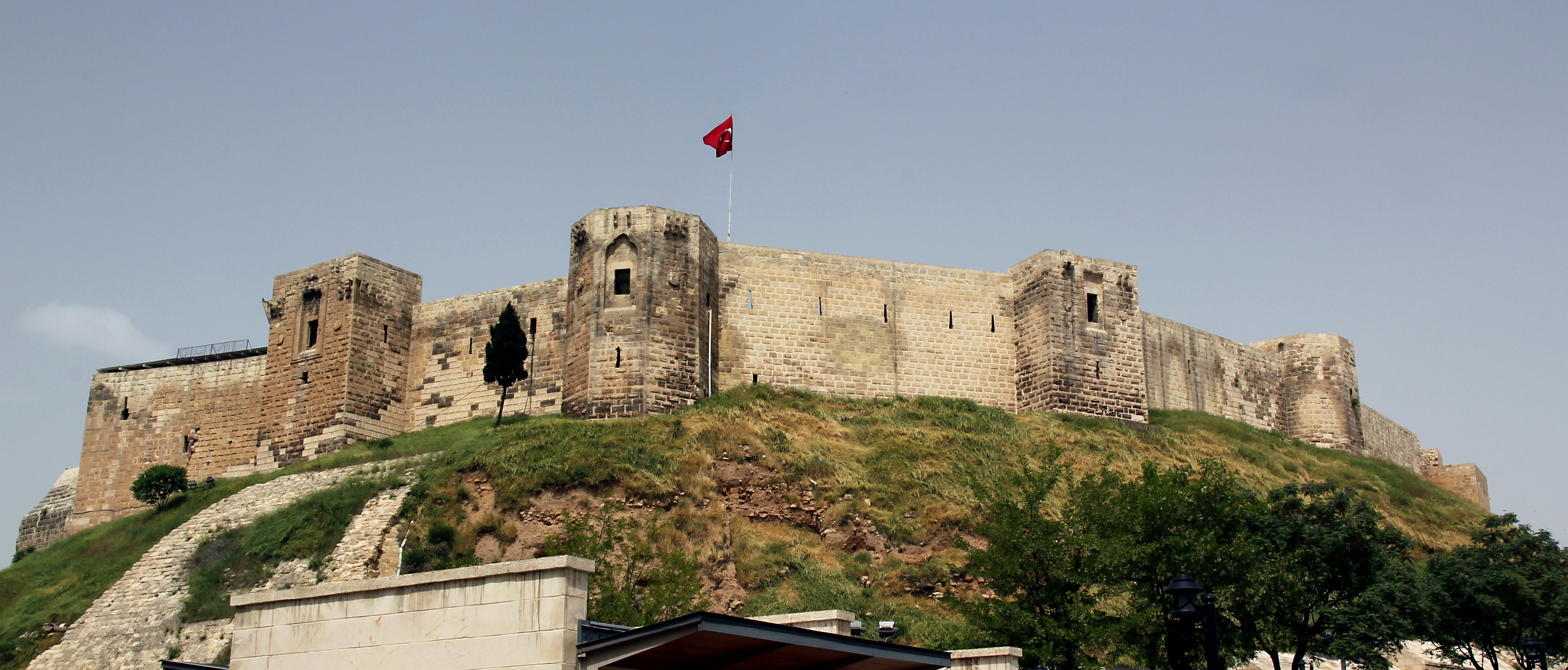
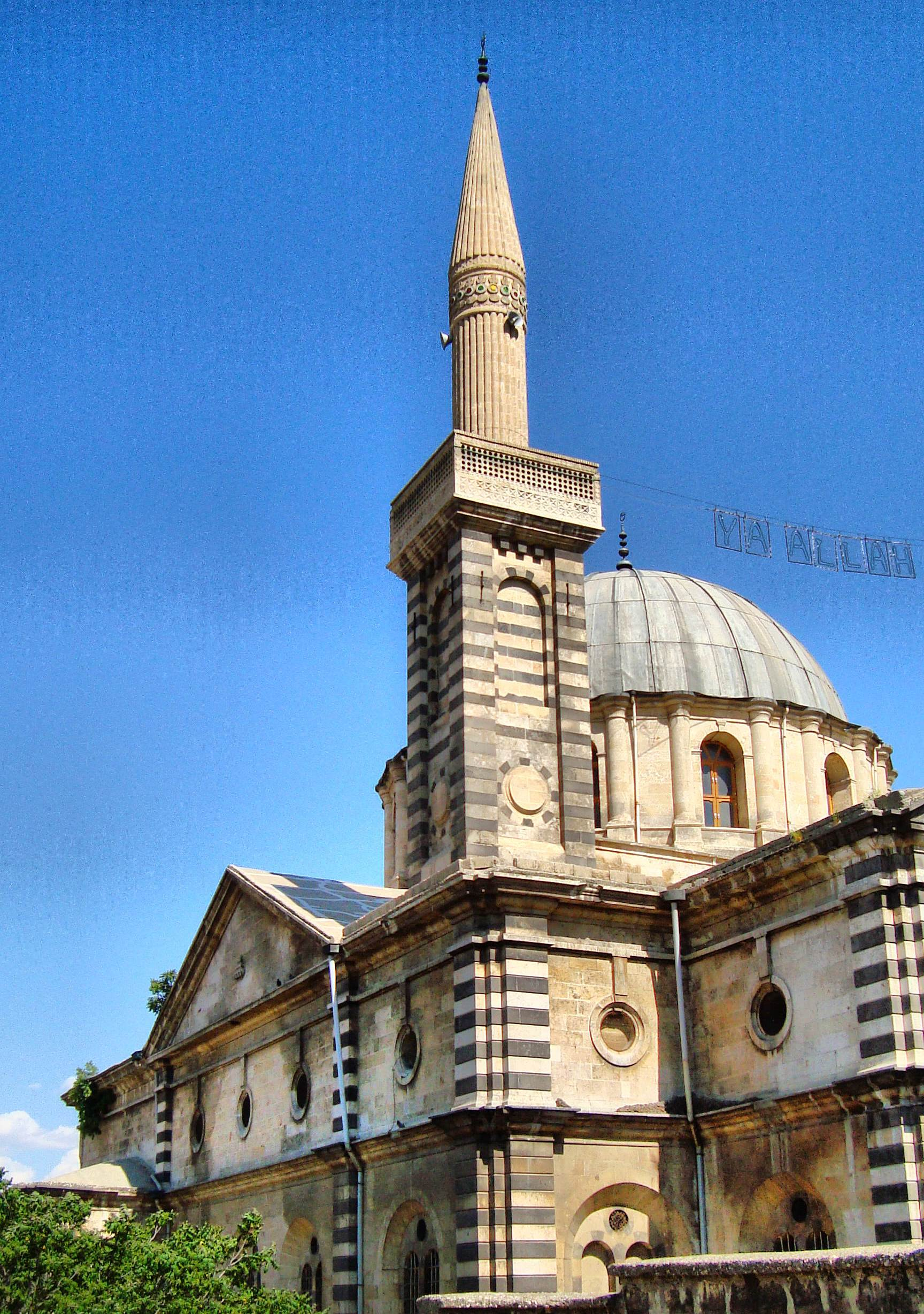
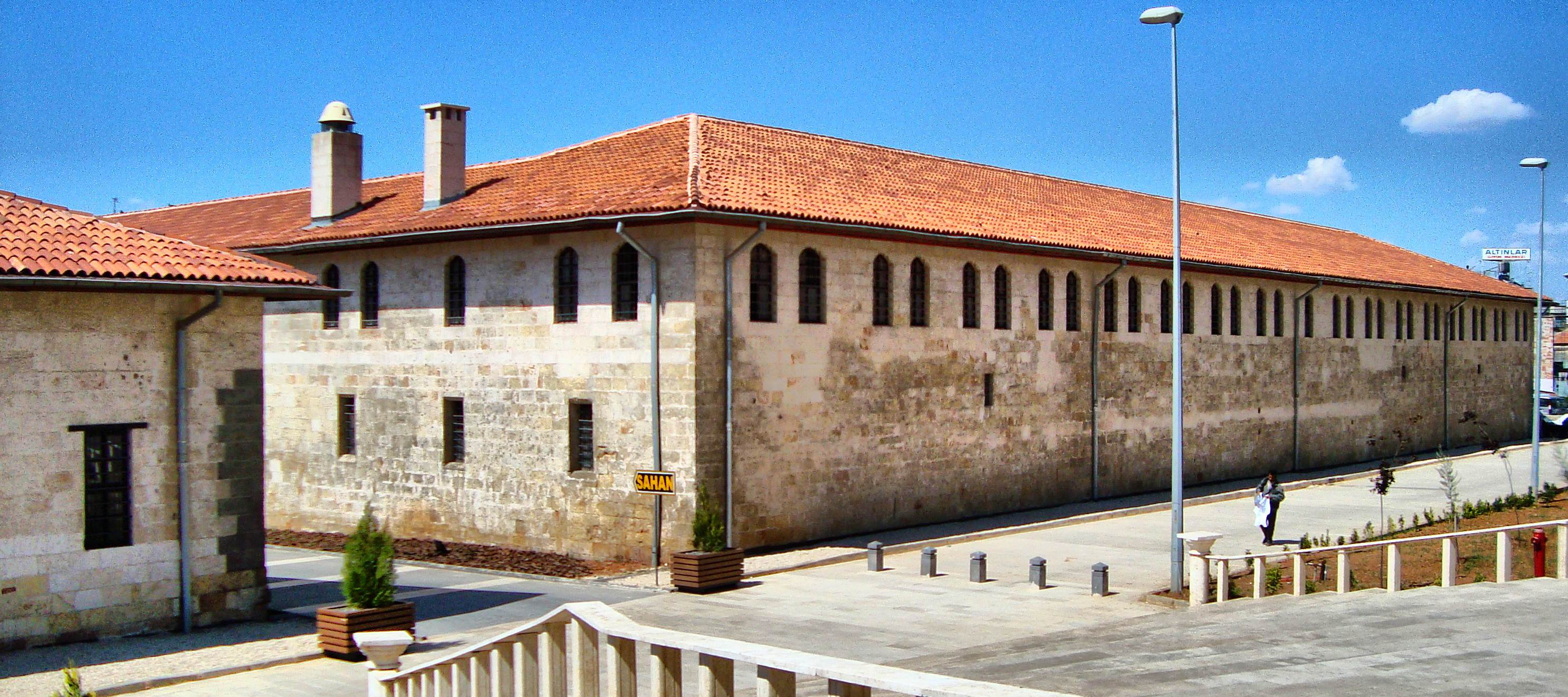
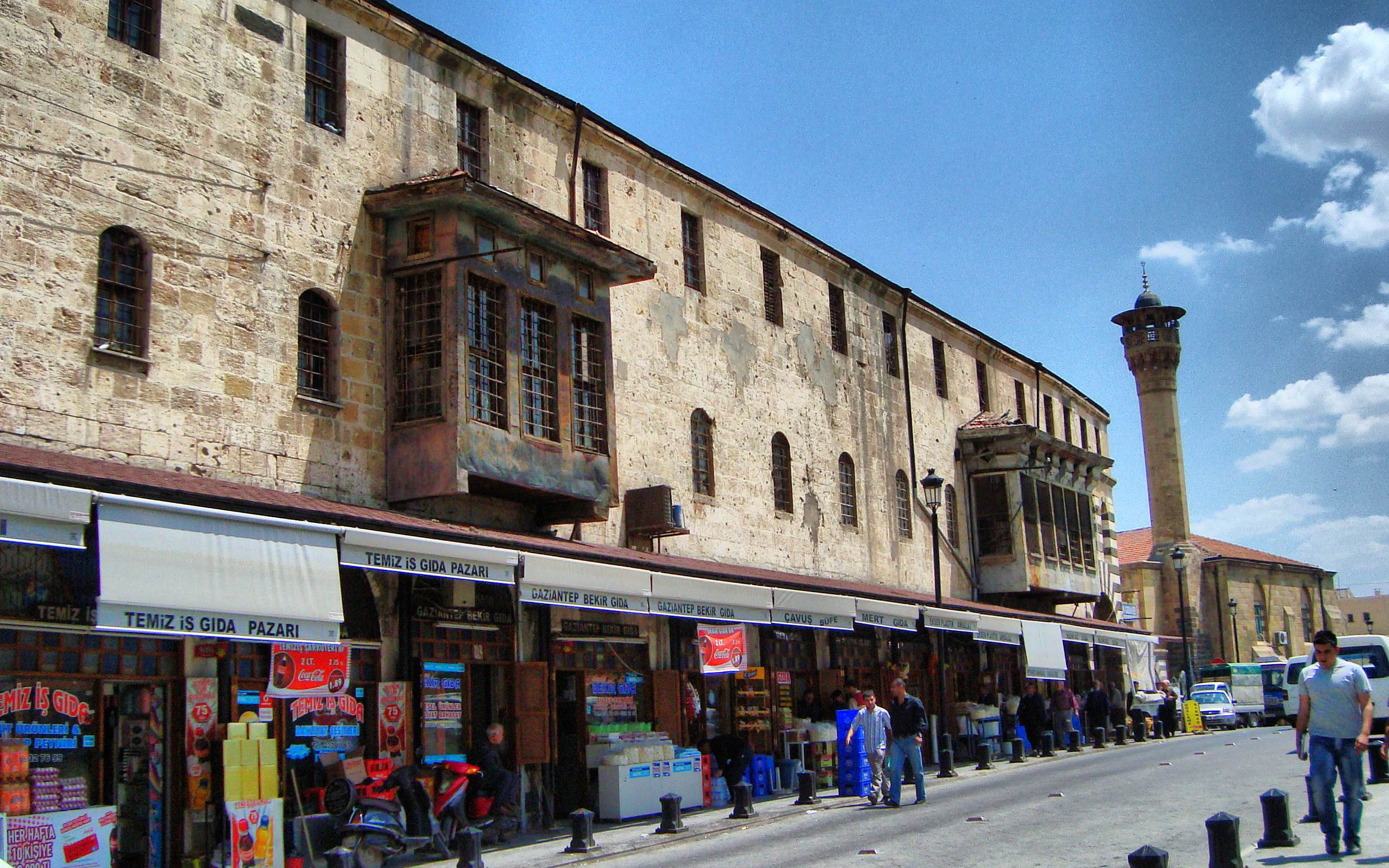
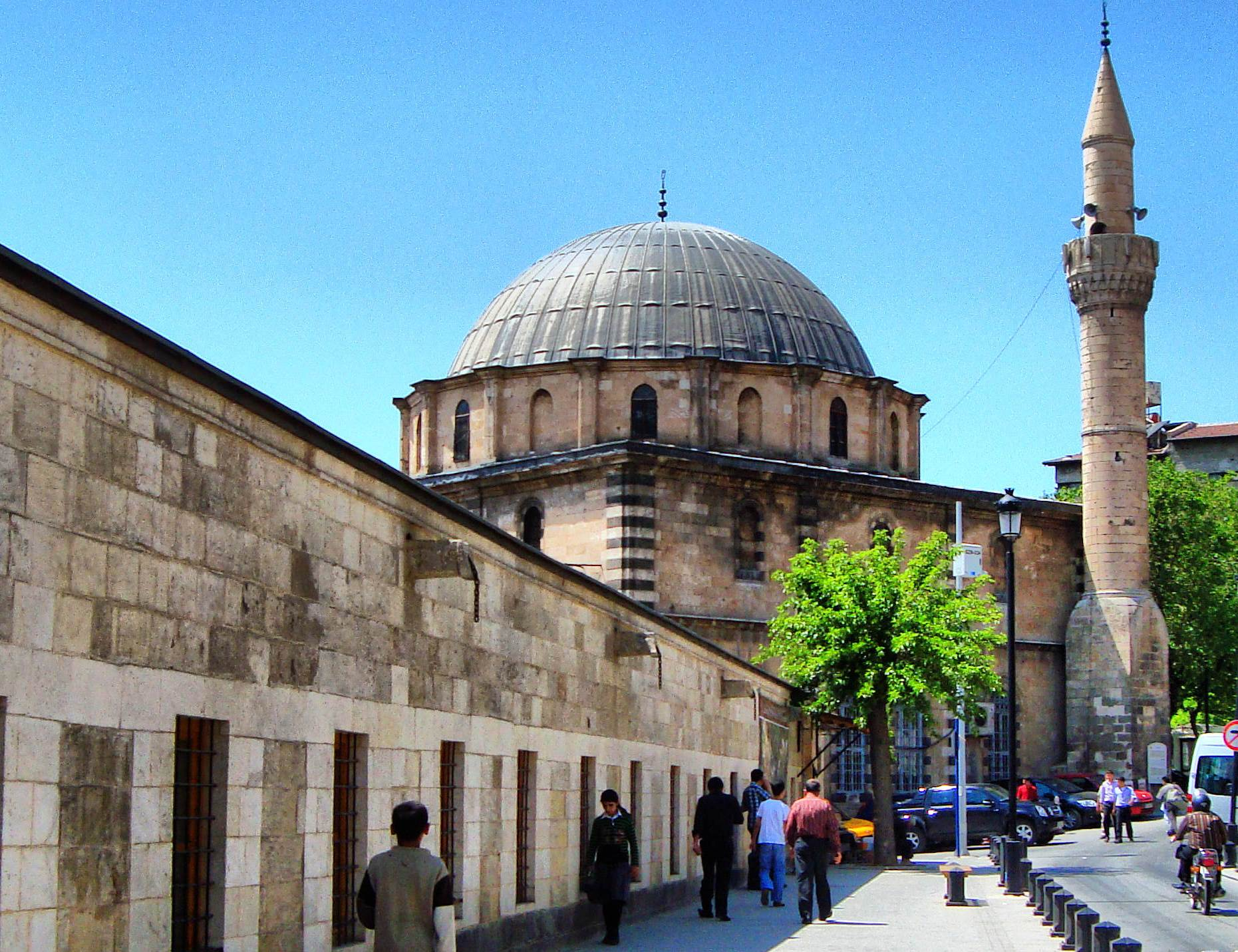
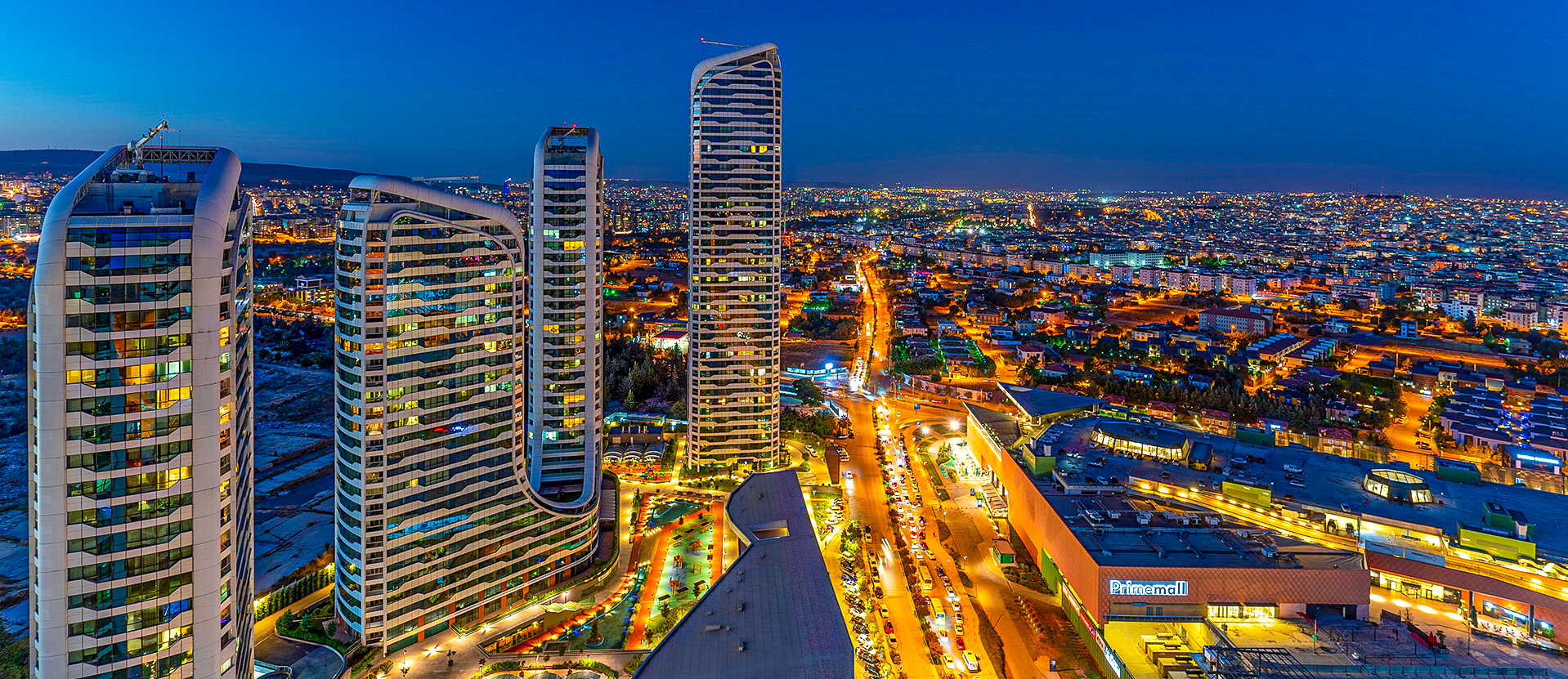
- Gaziantep Castle Liberation Mosque Şirehan Büdeyri Hanı and Tahtani Mosque Alaüddevle Mosque Gaziantep skyline

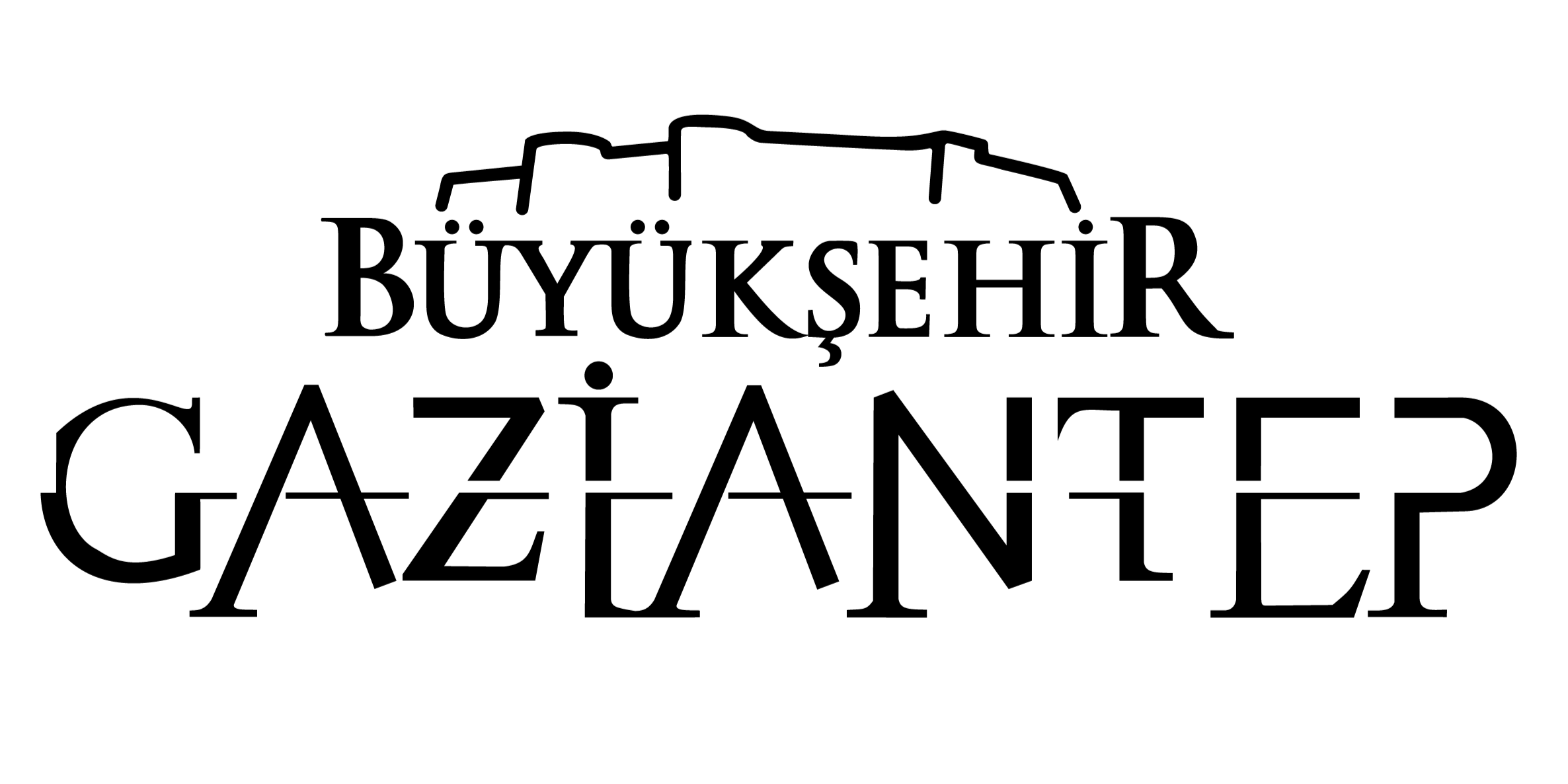
- Emblem of Gaziantep Metropolitan Municipality
- Interactive map of Gaziantep
- Location within Turkey Location within Asia Location within Europe
- Coordinates: 37°03′57″N 37°22′41″E
- Country: Turkey
- Region: Southeastern Anatolia
- Province: Gaziantep

Government
  - Mayor: Fatma Şahin (AK Party)

Area
  - Metropolitan municipality: 6,819 km^{2} (2,633 sq mi)
  - Urban: 2,960 km^{2} (1,140 sq mi)
  - Metro: 2,250 km^{2} (870 sq mi)

Population (31/12/2025 estimation)
  - Metropolitan municipality: 2,222,415
  - Density: 325.9/km^{2} (844.1/sq mi)
  - Urban: 1,900,000
  - Urban density: 640/km^{2} (1,700/sq mi)
- Demonym: Aintaban

GDP (nominal, 2024)
  - Metropolitan municipality: ₺830.106 billion (US$25.318 billion)
  - Per capita: ₺318,204 (US$9,705)
- Time zone: UTC+3 (TRT)
- Postal code: 27x xx
- Area code(s): 342 & 343
- Licence plate: 27
- Website: www.gaziantep.gov.tr

Gaziantep, (Note: Turkish pronunciation: [ɡaːˈziantep]) historically Aintab and still informally called Antep, (Note: Turkish pronunciation: [ˈantep]) is a major city in south-central Turkey. It is the capital of the Gaziantep Province, in the westernmost part of Turkey's Southeastern Anatolia Region and partially in the Mediterranean Region. It is located approximately 185 km (115 mi) east of Adana and 97 km (60 mi) north of Aleppo, Syria and situated on the Sajur River.

The city is thought to be located on the site of ancient Antiochia ad Taurum and is near ancient Zeugma. Sometime after the Byzantine-ruled city came under the Seljuk Empire, the region was administered by Armenian warlords. In 1098, it became part of the County of Edessa, a Crusader state, though it continued to be administered by Armenians, such as Kogh Vasil.

Aintab rose to prominence in the 14th century as the fortress became a settlement, hotly contested by the Mamluk Sultanate, Dulkadirids, and the Ilkhanate. It was besieged by Timur in 1400 and the Aq Qoyunlu in 1420. The Dulkadirid-controlled city fell to the Ottoman Empire in 1516 sometime before the Battle of Marj Dabiq.

At the end of 2025, Gaziantep province was home to 2,222,415 inhabitants, of whom around 1.9 million lived in the urban area. (Note: excluding registered Syrian refugees under temporary protection which count about 330,000 people in Gaziantep province) It is the fifth-most populous city in Turkey. Gaziantep is a diverse city inhabited mostly by ethnic Turks and a significant minority of Kurds and Syrian refugees. It was historically populated by Turkomans, Armenians, Jews, and a plethora of other ethnic groups.

In February 2023, the city was significantly damaged by the 2023 Turkey–Syria earthquake. Although three of the four most significant quakes of the earthquake occurred within the Gaziantep Province, the overall destruction to the city was reportedly less intense than that of Kahramanmaraş, Hatay, Malatya, and Adıyaman provinces, making it the fifth most affected province at 944 buildings collapsed. The destruction was reportedly much higher in the rural districts of Nurdağı and Islahiye, although a number of historic sites within the city such as mosques and Gaziantep Castle also suffered significant damages. Due to its size, location and relative intactness, the city served as a regional hub for international organizations and NGOs for earthquake relief and reconstruction after the earthquake.

== Name ==
Due to the city's contact with various ethnic groups and cultures throughout its history, the name of the city has many variants and alternatives, such as:

- Hantab, Hamtab, or Hatab as known by the Crusaders,
- Antab and its variants in vulgar Turkish and Armenian since 17th century the latest,
- Aīntāb (عين تاب) in Ottoman Turkish,
- Gazi Ayıntap in official Turkish after February 1921, when the Turkish parliament honored the city as غازى عینتاب Ghazi Aīntāb to commemorate its resistance to the French Siege of Aintab during the Franco-Turkish War,
- Gaziantep in official Turkish after 1928,
- 'Aīntāb (عينتاب) in Arabic,
- Êntab or Dîlok in Kurdish,
- Aïntab or Verdun Turc in French.

The several theories for the origin of the current name include:

- Aïn, an Arabic and Aramaic word meaning "spring", and tab as a word of praise.
- Antep could be a corruption of the Arabic 'aīn ṭayyib meaning "good spring". However, the Arabic name for the city is spelled with t (ت), not ṭ (ط).
- Ayin dab or Ayin debo in Aramaic, meaning "spring of the wolf"

== History ==
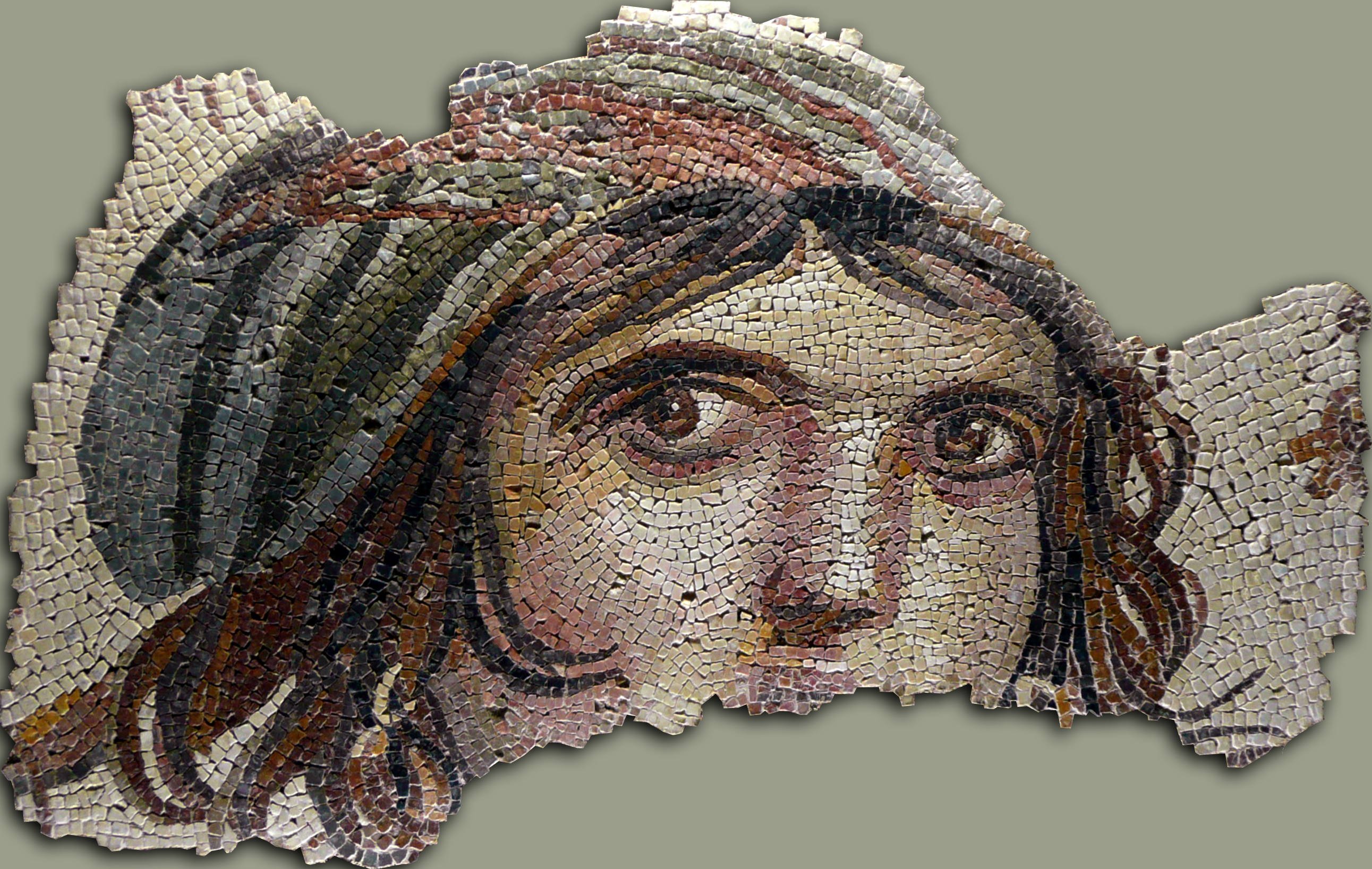
The Gypsy Girl is being displayed at Zeugma Mosaic Museum.

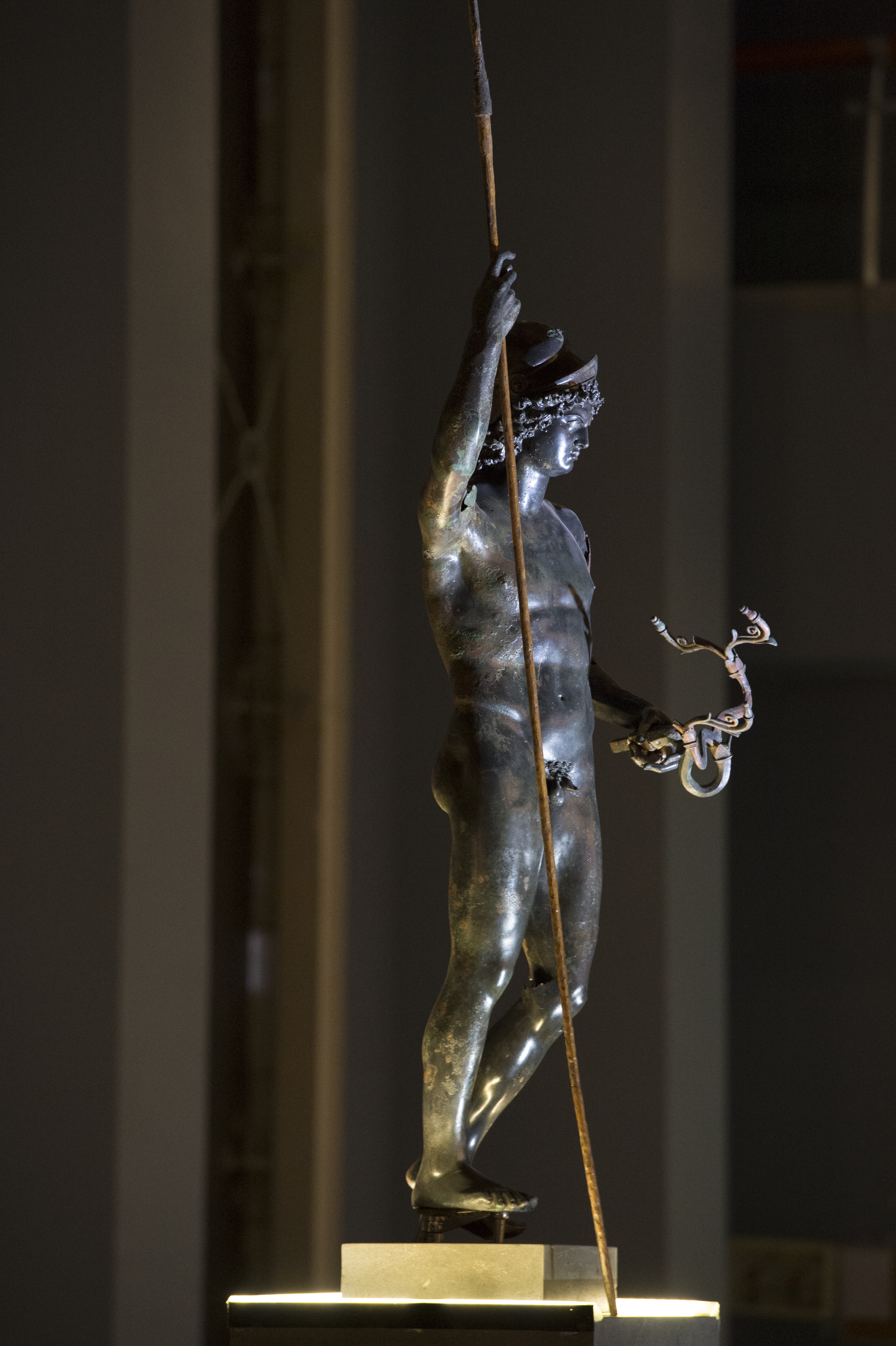
A bronze statue of Mars, Gaziantep Museum of Archaeology

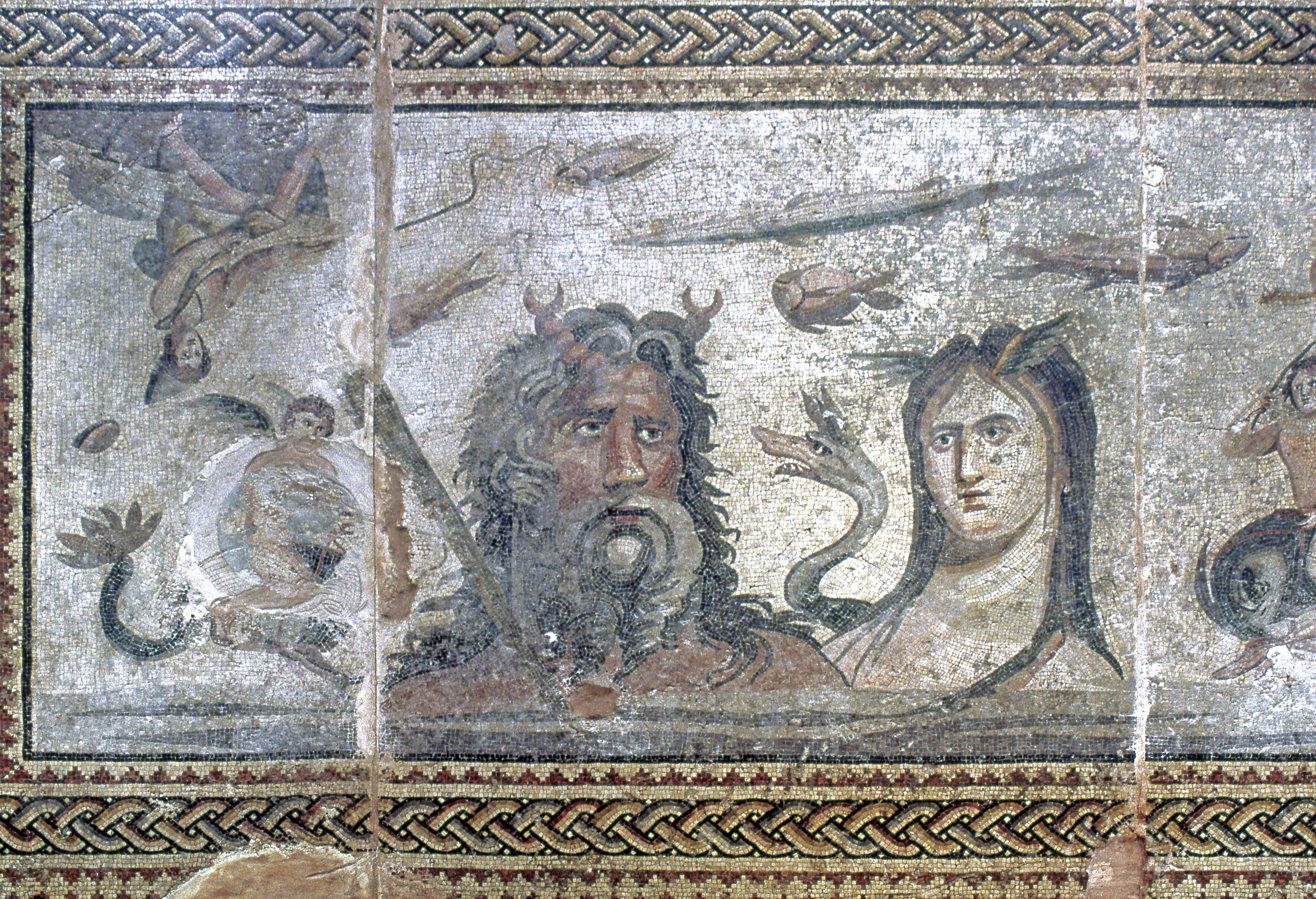
The Oceanus and Tethys mosaic in Zeugma Mosaic Museum

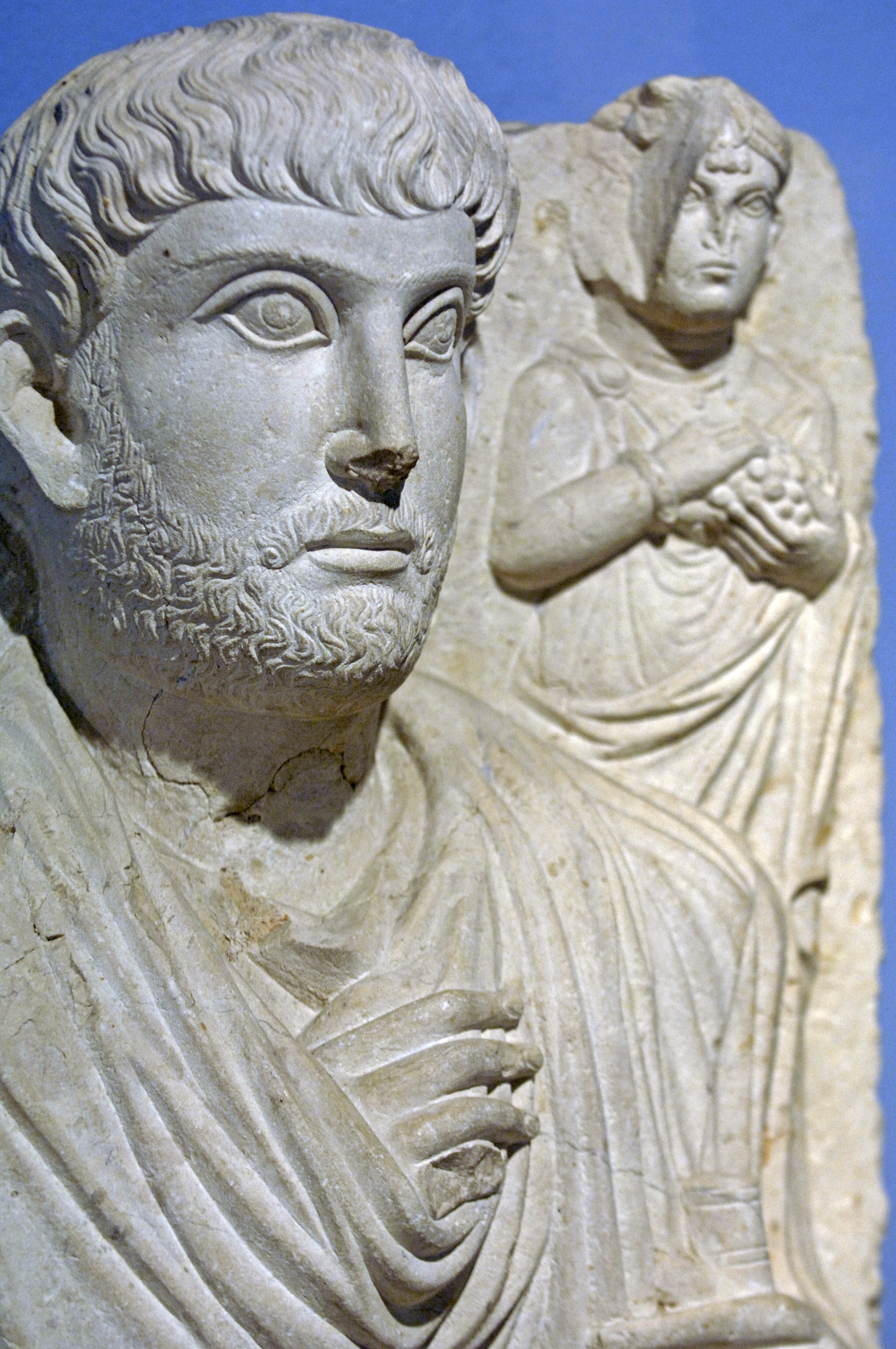
Funerary portrait of a man, Palmyra (Syria), second or third century AD, presented in Gaziantep Museum of Archaeology

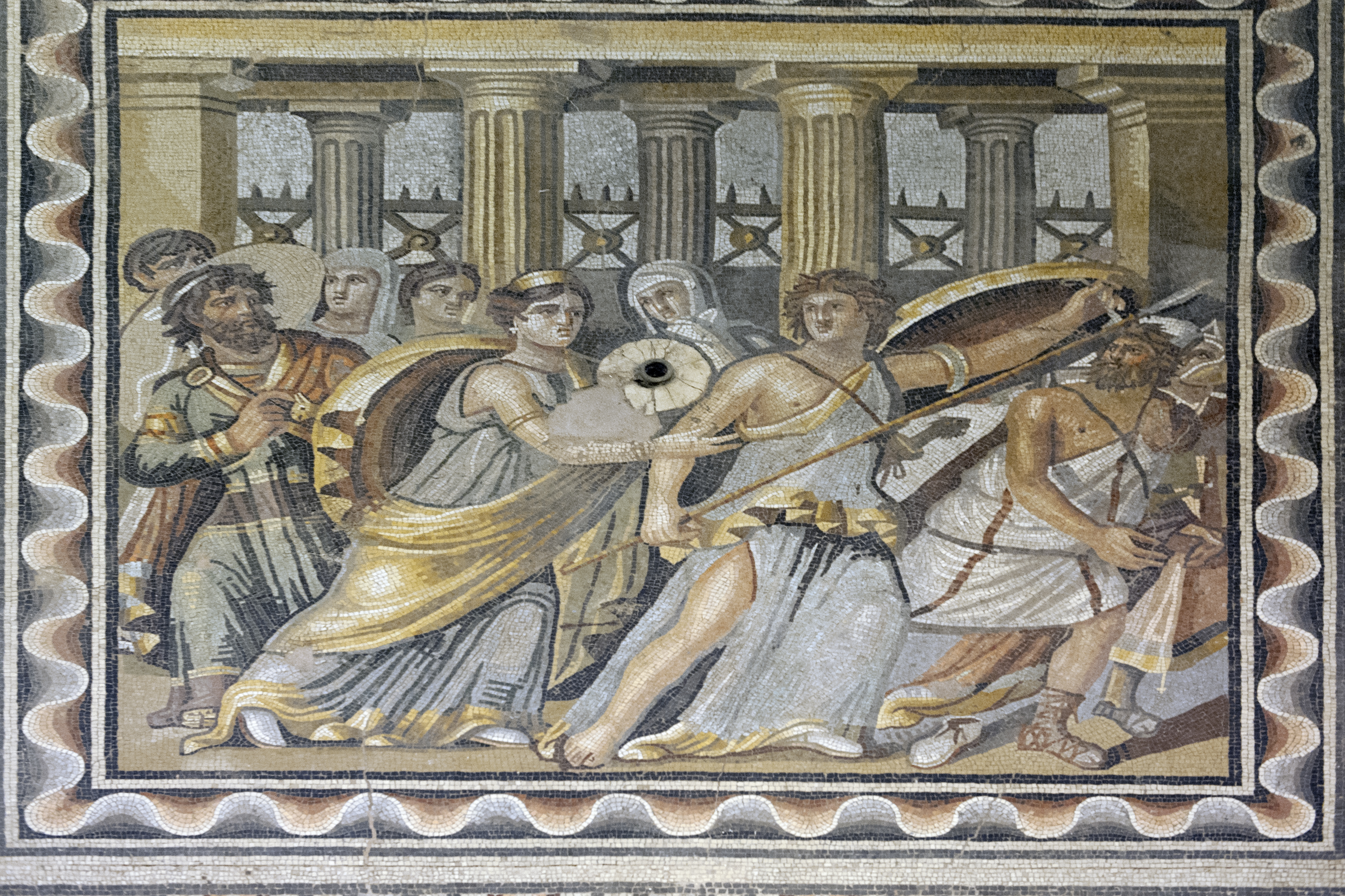
Gaziantep Zeugma Mosaic Museum Achilles mosaic

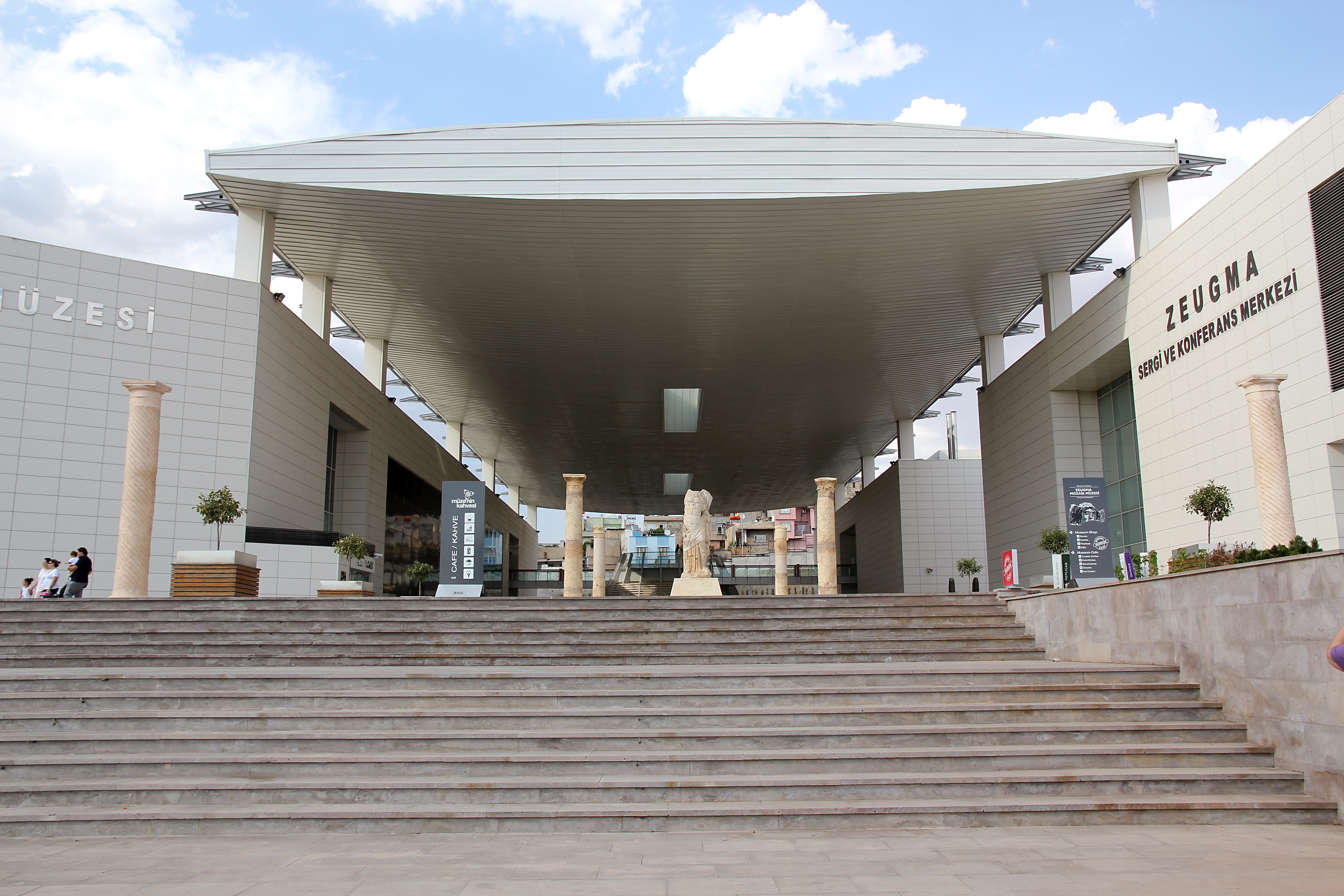
Zeugma Mosaic Museum in Gaziantep

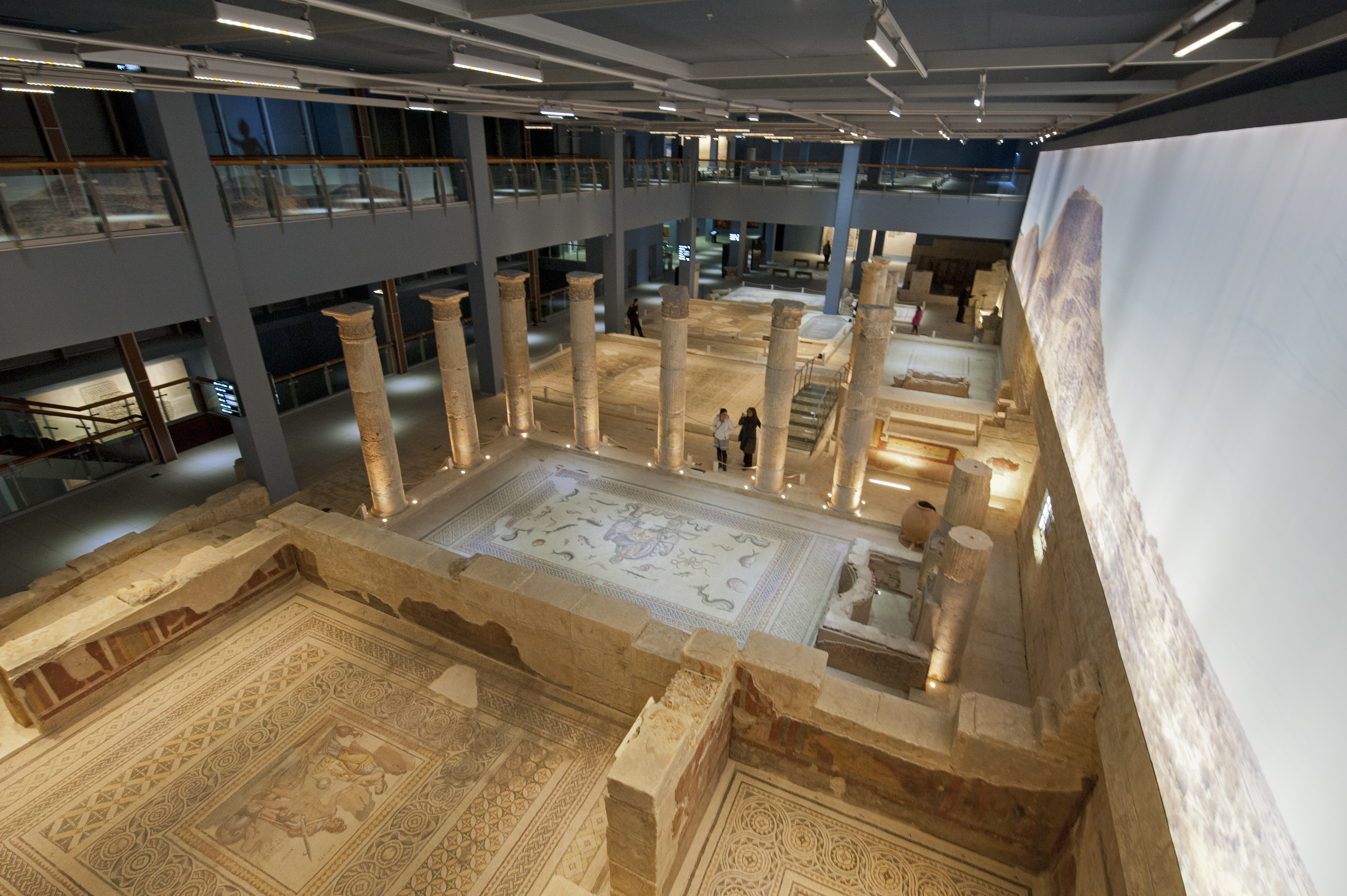
Zeugma Mosaic Museum Interior Entrance

=== Hellenistic period ===
Gaziantep is the probable site of the Hellenistic city of Antiochia ad Taurum ("Antiochia in the Taurus Mountains").

=== Medieval history ===
During its early history, Aintab was largely a fortress overshadowed by the city of Dülük, some 12 km to the north. Aintab came to prominence after an earthquake in the 14th century devastated Dülük. Following the Muslim conquest of the Levant 634–638 AD, the region passed to the Umayyads in 661 AD and the Abbasids in 750. It was ravaged several times during the Arab–Byzantine wars. After the disintegration of the Abbasid dynasty, the city was ruled successively by the Tulunids, the Ikhshidids, and the Hamdanids. In 962, it was recaptured by the Byzantines, upon the expansion led by Nikephoros II Phokas.

After Afshin Bey captured the fortress in 1067, Aintab fell to Seljuk rule and was administered by Seljuk emirs of Damascus. One of these emirs, Tutush I appointed Armenian noble Thoros of Edessa as the governor of the region.

It was captured by the Crusaders and united to the Maras Seigneurship in the County of Edessa in 1098. The region continued to be ruled by independent or vassalized Armenian lords, such as Kogh Vasil. It reverted to the Seljuk Sultanate of Rûm in 1150, was controlled by the Armenian Kingdom of Cilicia between 1155–1157 and 1204–1206 and captured by the Zengids in 1172 and the Ayyubids in 1181. It was retaken by the Seljuk Sultanate of Rûm in 1218.

With the turn of the 13th-century, Dülük became one of Aintab's dependencies according to geographer Yaqut al-Hamawi. In the next century, Aintab was the capital of its district and a town with fine markets much frequented by merchants and travellers, while Dülük was in ruins, according to Abulfeda. Still, Aintab continued to be hotly contested throughout these centuries. It was besieged by the Mongols in 1270.

It repeatedly changed hands between the Ilkhanate and the Mamluk Sultanate or the Dulkadirids, a Turkoman vassal state of the Mamluks. Gaziantep was near the southern frontier of the Dulkadir emirate, and on several occasions it slipped out of their control. The Ilkhans ruled over it between 1260 and 1261, 1271–1272, 1280–1281 and 1299–1317. The Mamluks controlled the city between 1261 and 1271, 1272–1280, 1281–1299, 1317–1341, 1353–1378, 1381–1389. It was unsuccessfully besieged by the Dulkadir leader Sevli Beg in 1390. Although the Mamluks and their Dulkadirid vassals could control the city from 1395 until the Ottoman conquest in 1516, the city was besieged by Timur in 1400, and then in 1420 by the leader Qara Qoyunlu of Kara Yusuf.

These attacks all caused destruction and suffering among the local population. But at the same time, the city was "acquiring a reputation as a cultured urban center". Badr al-Din al-Ayni, an Aintab native who became a successful diplomat, judge, and historian under the Mamluks, wrote at the end of the 1300s that the city was called "little Bukhara" because so many scholars came to study there. Ayni also left a firsthand account of the suffering caused during Sevli Beg's siege in 1390.

Another rough patch for Aintab's people came in the late 1460s, when the Dulkadir prince Şehsuvar rebelled against the Mamluks. Mamluk forces captured Aintab in May 1468, driving out Şehsuvar's forces; a report by the governor of Aleppo indicates that resistance had been fierce. Just a month later, Şehsuvar recaptured Aintab after four "engagements" with Mamluk forces. After Şehsuvar's final defeat and public execution by the Mamluks in 1473, Gaziantep enjoyed a period of relative peace and stability under his brother and successor Alaüddevle. Alaüddevle appears to have considered Gaziantep an important possession and commissioned several constructions in the city, including a reservoir and a large mosque in the middle of town. The city's fortress was also renovated, completed in 1481. These repairs were likely ordered by the Mamluk sultan Qaitbay during his tour of northern Syria in 1477; his name is inscribed above the entrance portal, perhaps symbolically marking his territory.

The end of the Dulkadir principality came around 1515. Alaüddevle refused to fight alongside the Ottomans at the Battle of Chaldiran in 1514. The Ottomans used this as a pretext to overthrow him, and in June 1515 he was executed. As Alaüddevle had been a Mamluk vassal, the Mamluks considered this an affront, and the Mamluk sultan Qansuh al-Ghawri mobilized an army and marched north towards Aleppo.

The conflict over the region meant that in Gaziantep, anxieties about the fate of the city and its surroundings must have been high. Later court records from the early 1540s provide documentary evidence of "dislocation and loss of population" as people fled; this may have been more pronounced in rural areas than in the city itself.

=== Ottoman period ===
The Ottoman Empire captured Gaziantep just before the Battle of Marj Dabiq in 1516, under the reign of Sultan Selim I. In the Ottoman period, Aintab was a sanjak centred initially in the Dulkadir Eyalet (1516–1818), and later in the Aleppo vilayet (1908–1918). It was also a kaza in the Aleppo vilayet (1818–1908). The city established itself as a centre for commerce due to its location straddling trade routes.

Although it was controlled by the Armenian Kingdom of Cilicia only between 1155–1157 and 1204–1206, for most of the last two millennia, Gaziantep hosted a large Armenian community. Armenians played a significant role in the city's history, culture, welfare, and prosperity. These communities no longer exist in the city due to the Hamidian massacres in 1895 and the Armenian genocide in 1915.

Gaziantep served a significant trade route within the Ottoman Empire. Armenians were active in manufacturing, agriculture production and, most notably, trade, and became the wealthiest ethnic group in the city, until their wealth was confiscated during the Armenian genocide.

==== Battle of Marj Dabiq ====
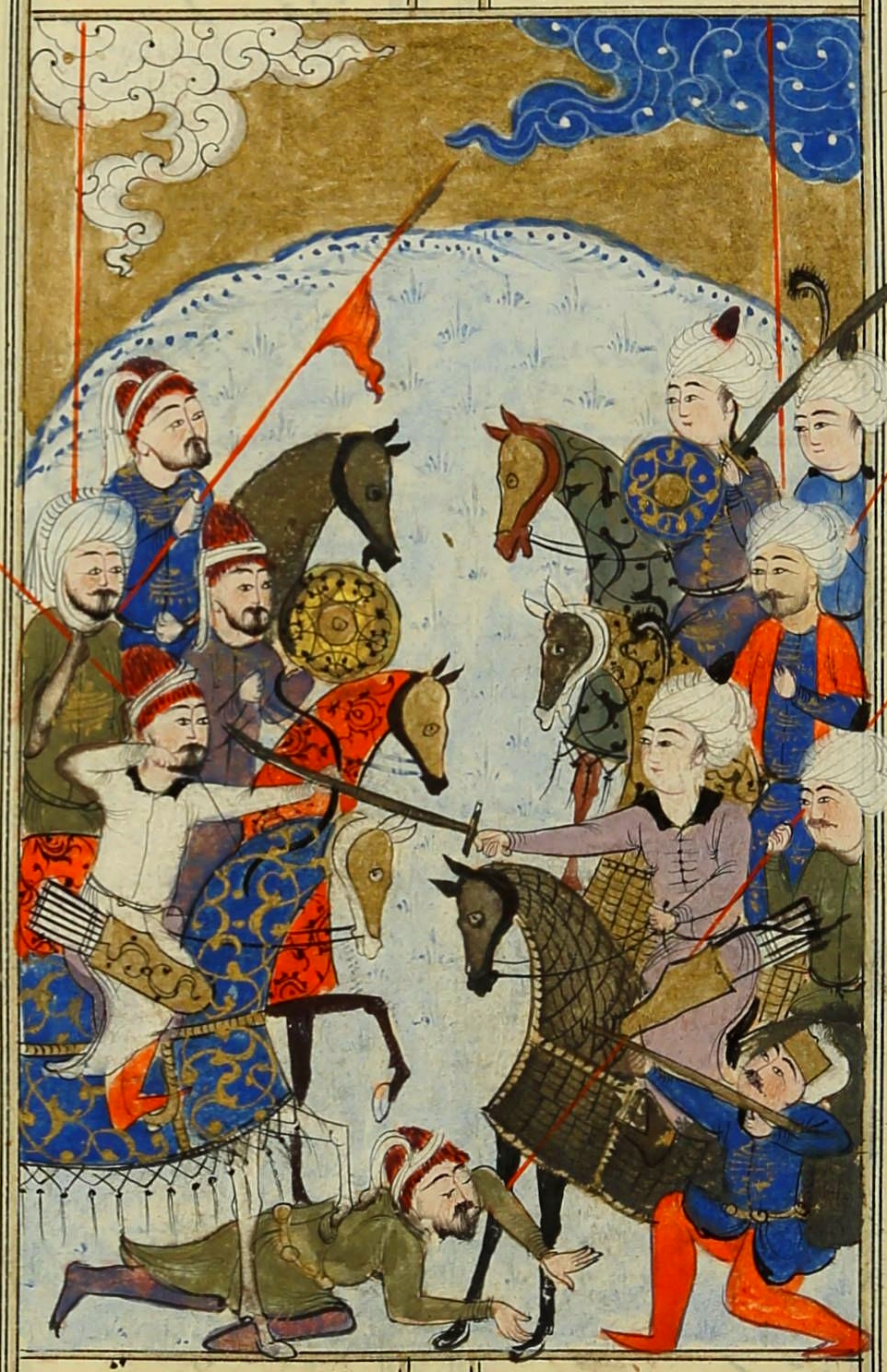
Miniature of the Battle of Mercidabık as depicted in the Selimname. Selīm-nāma by Şūkrī-i Bitlisī f.216b. The Battle of Marj Dabiq (Mercidabık), circa 1516.

At the beginning of his campaign against the Mamluks in 1516, the Ottoman sultan Selim I brought his army to Gaziantep en route to Syria. The city's Mamluk governor, Yunus Beg, submitted to Selim without a fight and gave him the keys to the castle on 20 August. The next day, 21 August, Selim set up camp outside the city "with great majesty and pomp" and held meetings with local military commanders to discuss strategy for the upcoming battle. The fateful Battle of Marj Dabiq took place just days later, on 24 August. Gaziantep, although not an active battle site, thus played a strategic role in the Ottoman conquest of the Mamluk sultanate.

The Ottoman victory at Marj Dabiq had profound consequences for Gaziantep, although its inhabitants had no way of knowing at the time. For the first time in almost 1,000 years, Gaziantep was located in the middle of an empire rather than a contested border region. It lost its strategic importance, but also its vulnerability to attack. For four centuries, until the French occupation in 1921, Gaziantep was relatively peaceful.

==== Economic recovery ====
In the short term, though, Gaziantep was still reeling from the instability before (and after) the Ottoman conquest. During that period, Gaziantep had suffered from "depredation", as well as fear caused by political uncertainty. Besides political conflict, the city's economic slump at this time can also be partly attributed to a general decline in commerce in the eastern Mediterranean region that caused a general economic downturn in the region in the early 1500s.

Only around the 1530s, when the Ottoman authorities turned their attention to the territories recently conquered from Dulkadir, do cadastral records indicate renewed prosperity in Gaziantep. An important event was Süleyman the Magnificent's successful Mesopotamian campaign against Safavid Iran in 1534-36, which took Baghdad and increased the security of trade routes in Gaziantep's region. As with the earlier economic downturn, the renewed prosperity in Gaziantep in the 1530s was part of a broader regional pattern of economic growth during this period.

As a disclaimer – some of this apparent economic growth may be an artifact of using tax documents as a source. Tax assessors may have simply been doing more accurate counts in later surveys, or the government might have been applying more strict scrutiny as their control increased. Part of this was deliberate – the Ottomans had a policy of lowering taxes in recently conquered territories, both to placate locals and to provide an economic stimulus to help war-torn areas recover. Later, as their control solidified, the authorities would raise taxes again. According to Leslie Peirce, this seems to have been the case in Gaziantep – tax rates in 1536 were significantly lower than the rates in 1520, which she assumes were the pre-Ottoman rates. The rates went up again in the 1543 survey, which she interprets as the Ottomans raising taxes again in the meantime.

==== Administrative changes ====
The Dulkadir emirate did not simply go away immediately after the Ottoman victory at Marj Dabiq. It stuck around as an Ottoman vassal until 1522, when the last Dulkadir ruler "resisted discipline by the Ottoman administration". The Ottomans had him executed and officially dismantled the Dulkadir principality, annexing its territories to the empire to form the beglerbeglik of Dulkadir.

Despite being part of the former Dulkadir territories, though, the sanjak of Gaziantep was initially put under the beglerbeglik of Aleppo instead of Dulkadir. This indicates how, just as in the Mamluk period, Gaziantep was then seen more as part of northern Syria than as part of Anatolia. The area was "culturally mixed", and many locals were bilingual in Turkish and Arabic (as well as other languages). Gaziantep's cultural and economic ties were mostly with Aleppo, which was a major international center of trade.

At some point in the 1530s, Gaziantep was moved into the beglerbeglik of Dulkadir, whose capital was Maraş. Even though it was now administratively part of Dulkadir, Gaziantep remained commercially more connected to Aleppo.

==== 17th through 19th centuries ====
The 17th-century Turkish traveller Evliya Çelebi noted it had 3,900 shops and two bedestens.

In 1818, Gaziantep was moved back into the Aleppo province.

By the end of the 19th century, Aintab had a population of about 45,000, two-thirds of whom were Muslim—largely Turkish, but also partially Arab. A large community of Christians lived in the Armenian community. In the 19th century, considerable American Protestant Christian missionary activity occurred in Aintab. In particular, Central Turkey College was founded in 1874 by the American Mission Board and largely served the Armenian community. The Armenians were systemically slaughtered during the Hamidian massacres in 1895 and later the Armenian genocide in 1915. Consequently, the Central Turkey College was transferred to Aleppo in 1916.

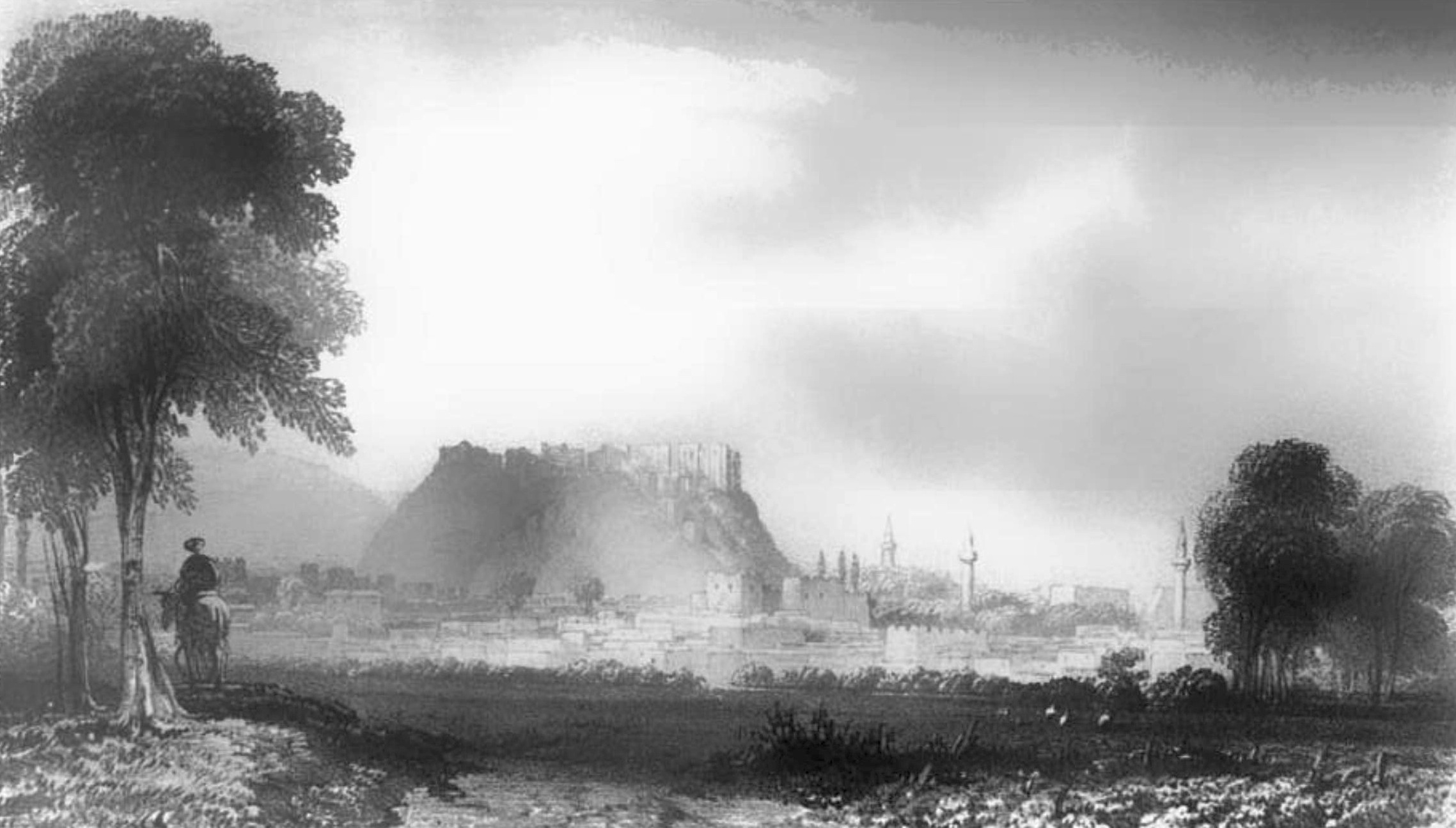
Aintab in the mid-19th century

=== Republic of Turkey ===
After the First World War and Armistice of Mudros, Gaziantep was occupied by the United Kingdom on 17 December 1918, and it was transferred to France on 5 November 1919. The French Armenian Legion was also involved in occupation. In April 1920 irregular Turkish troops known as Kuva-yi Milliye besieged the city, but the 10-month-long battle resulted in French victory. Around 6,000 Turkish civilians were killed in the process.

The French made the last attempt to revive the Armenian community in the city during the Siege of Aintab, where the Armenians who fled the genocide were promised their homes back in their native lands. However, on 25 December 1921, the Treaty of Ankara was signed, and as a result, the French evacuated the city.

According to Ümit Kurt, born in modern-day Gaziantep and an academic at Harvard's Center for Middle East Studies, "The famous battle of Aintab against the French … seems to have been as much the organised struggle of a group of genocide profiteers seeking to hold onto their loot as it was a fight against an occupying force. The resistance … sought to make it impossible for the Armenian repatriates to remain in their native towns, terrorising them [again] to make them flee. In short, not only did the local … landowners, industrialists, and civil-military bureaucratic elites lead to the resistance movement, but they also financed it to cleanse Aintab of Armenians." The same Turkish families who made their wealth through the expropriation of Armenians in 1915 and 1921/1922 continued to dominate the city's politics through the one-party period of the Republic of Turkey.

In 2013, Turkey, a member state of NATO, requested deployment of MIM-104 Patriot missiles to Gaziantep to be able to respond faster in a case of military operation against Turkish soil in the Syrian Civil War, which was accepted.

Video showing damage to the castle and the nearby Şirvani Mosque on the day of the 2023 earthquake. Gaziantep Castle was first built by the Hittite Empire as an observation point and later built into a main castle by the Roman Empire.

On 6 February 2023, the city and nearby areas were devastated by catastrophic earthquakes. Around 900 buildings collapsed and 10,777 other buildings were heavily damaged in the city, which have been slated for demolition. Historic buildings including the Gaziantep Castle, the Şirvani Mosque and the Liberation Mosque were also heavily damaged.

== Geography ==
The city is located on the Aintab plateau.

=== Climate ===
Köppen map of Gaziantep Province and surrounding regions:
- BSh
- Csa
- Dsa
- Dsb

Gaziantep has a hot-summer Mediterranean climate (Köppen: Csa, Trewartha: Cs), with very hot, dry summers and cool, wet and often snowy winters.

According to 1966 data, on average, Gaziantep experiences 4.6 snowy days per winter with 10 days of snow cover, along with 2.5 days of hail.

Highest recorded temperature: 44.0 °C (111.2 °F) on 29 July 2000 and 14 August 2023
Lowest recorded temperature: −17.5 °C (0.5 °F) on 15 January 1950

Climate data for Gaziantep (1991–2020, extremes 1940–2023)
Month	Jan	Feb	Mar	Apr	May	Jun	Jul	Aug	Sep	Oct	Nov	Dec	Year
Record high °C (°F)	19.0 (66.2)	24.3 (75.7)	28.1 (82.6)	34.0 (93.2)	37.8 (100.0)	40.2 (104.4)	44.0 (111.2)	44.0 (111.2)	40.8 (105.4)	36.4 (97.5)	27.3 (81.1)	25.2 (77.4)	44.0 (111.2)
Mean daily maximum °C (°F)	8.4 (47.1)	10.2 (50.4)	15.0 (59.0)	20.3 (68.5)	26.0 (78.8)	31.9 (89.4)	36.0 (96.8)	36.2 (97.2)	31.8 (89.2)	25.0 (77.0)	16.5 (61.7)	10.4 (50.7)	22.3 (72.1)
Daily mean °C (°F)	3.9 (39.0)	5.1 (41.2)	9.3 (48.7)	14.0 (57.2)	19.3 (66.7)	24.8 (76.6)	28.7 (83.7)	28.7 (83.7)	24.2 (75.6)	17.7 (63.9)	10.2 (50.4)	5.6 (42.1)	16.0 (60.8)
Mean daily minimum °C (°F)	0.4 (32.7)	0.9 (33.6)	4.2 (39.6)	8.3 (46.9)	13.0 (55.4)	18.1 (64.6)	22.1 (71.8)	22.1 (71.8)	17.5 (63.5)	11.7 (53.1)	5.4 (41.7)	1.9 (35.4)	10.5 (50.9)
Record low °C (°F)	−17.5 (0.5)	−15.6 (3.9)	−11 (12)	−4.3 (24.3)	0.4 (32.7)	4.5 (40.1)	9.0 (48.2)	10.8 (51.4)	3.4 (38.1)	−3.9 (25.0)	−9.7 (14.5)	−15 (5)	−17.5 (0.5)
Average precipitation mm (inches)	98.1 (3.86)	89.6 (3.53)	68.9 (2.71)	56.1 (2.21)	32.9 (1.30)	9.2 (0.36)	10.6 (0.42)	8.5 (0.33)	13.1 (0.52)	42.6 (1.68)	67.5 (2.66)	104.5 (4.11)	601.6 (23.69)
Average precipitation days	12.3	11.5	11.3	10.1	7.5	2.27	0.67	0.53	1.9	6.2	8.1	11.7	84.1
Average snowy days	2.9	1.3	1.3	0	0	0	0	0	0	0	0	0.4	5.9
Average relative humidity (%)	74.2	70.8	64.7	61.3	56.0	47.5	43.9	46.9	49.4	57.2	67.2	73.7	59.3
Mean monthly sunshine hours	107.1	119.7	161.4	189.8	220.9	261.2	275.9	268.2	232.2	197.1	149.2	96.3	2,149.5
Mean daily sunshine hours	3.6	4.4	5.3	6.4	7.1	8.7	8.9	8.7	7.8	6.4	5.1	3.4	6.3
Source 1: Turkish State Meteorological Service
Source 2: NOAA (humidity, sun 1991-2020), Meteomanz

== Politics ==
The current mayor of Gaziantep is Fatma Şahin, who had previously served as the minister of family and social policies in the third cabinet of Erdoğan. The city has historically supported conservative parties such as Democrat Party, Justice party and AKP, although support for opposition parties has been growing in recent years. Most significantly on the 31 March mayoral elections, the district governor candidates of the main opposition party CHP have won in the metropolitan district of Şehitkâmil, alongside two rural districts, tying with AKP on the number of districts won in the province at 3.

=== Mayors of Gaziantep Metropolitan Municipality ===
Mayors of Gaziantep
Mayor	Years of service
Fatma Şahin (AK Party)	2014–present
Asım Güzelbey (AK Party)	2004–2014
Celal Doğan (SHP, CHP)	1989–2004
Ömer Arpacıoğlu (ANAP)	1984–1989

== Economy ==
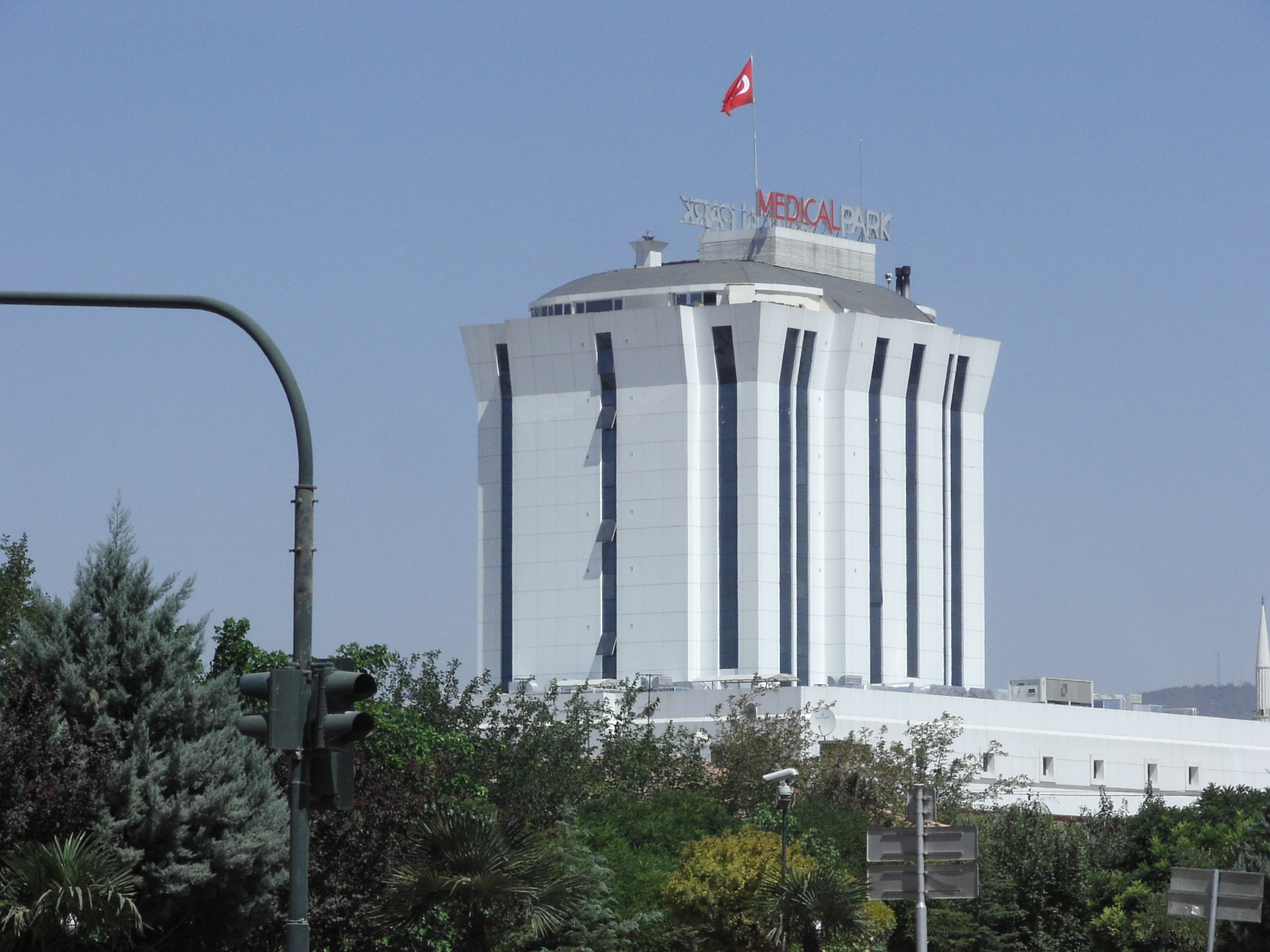
Medical Park Hospital (later renamed as Medical Point Hospital) in Gaziantep

Gaziantep is famous for its regional specialities: copperware and "Yemeni" sandals, specific to the region, are two examples. The city is an economic centre for Southeastern and Eastern Turkey. The number of large industrial businesses established in Gaziantep comprise four percent of Turkish industry in general, while small industries comprise six percent. Also, Gaziantep has the largest organised industrial area in Turkey and holds first position in exports and imports. The city is the centre of the green olive oil-based Nizip Soap industry.

Traditionally, commerce in Gaziantep was centre in covered markets known as 'Bedesten' or 'Hans', the best known of which are the Zincirli Bedesten, Hüseyin Pasha Bedesten and Kemikli Bedesten.

Gaziantep also has a developing tourist industry. Development around the base of the castle upgrades the accessibility to the castle and to the surrounding copper workshops. New restaurants and tourist-friendly businesses are moving into the area. In comparison with some other regions of Turkey, tourists are still relatively uncommon in Gaziantep.

Gaziantep is one of the leading producers of machined carpets in the world. It exported approximately US$700 million of machine-made carpets in 2006. There are over 100 carpet facilities in the Gaziantep Organized Industrial Zone.

With its extensive olive groves, vineyards, and pistachio orchards, Gaziantep is one of the important agricultural and industrial centres of Turkey.

Gaziantep is the centre of pistachio cultivation in Turkey, producing 60,000 metric tons (59,000 long tons; 66,000 short tons) in 2007, and lends its name to the Turkish word for pistachio, Antep fıstığı, meaning "Antep nut".

Gaziantep is the main centre for pistachio processing in Turkey, with some 80% of the country's pistachio processing (such as shelling, packaging, exporting, and storage) being done in the city. "Antep fıstığı" is a protected geographical indication in Turkey; it was registered under this status in 2000.

In 2009, the largest enclosed shopping centre in the city and region, Sanko Park, opened, and began drawing a significant number of shoppers from Syria.

Ties between Turkey and Syria have severely deteriorated since the beginning of the Syrian civil war in 2011.

== Demographics ==
Gaziantep is mostly inhabited by Turks. It is also inhabited by a significant minority of Kurds, about 450 thousand people, and roughly 470 thousand Syrian refugees.

=== History ===
In early 14th century, Arab geographer Dimashki noted that the people of Aintab were Turkomans. Aintab continued to be Turkish or Turkoman majority through the 18th, 19th, and 20th centuries. Armenians inhabited Aintab from at least 10th century until the Armenian genocide. Having abandoned Armenian in favour of Turkish as early as the 16th century, the Armenians of Aintab predominantly spoke Turkish, while the usage of Armenian increased after 1850. The city also housed a smaller Jewish minority predominantly of Sephardic origin. The Jewish population quickly decreased in mid-20th century, reaching zero people by 1980s. Unlike most Southeastern Anatolian cities, the city of Gaziantep did not have a significant Kurdish minority until the 20th century, when it saw an increase in its Kurdish population through economically motivated migration from Turkish Kurdistan. Up until the late 2010s, the Kurdish population increased to one fourth of the city and the province with 400,000 - 450,000 Kurds. In the late Ottoman era, the city included a number of Europeans and Americans. Aintab also had a sizable Uzbek minority dating back to the Ottoman period.

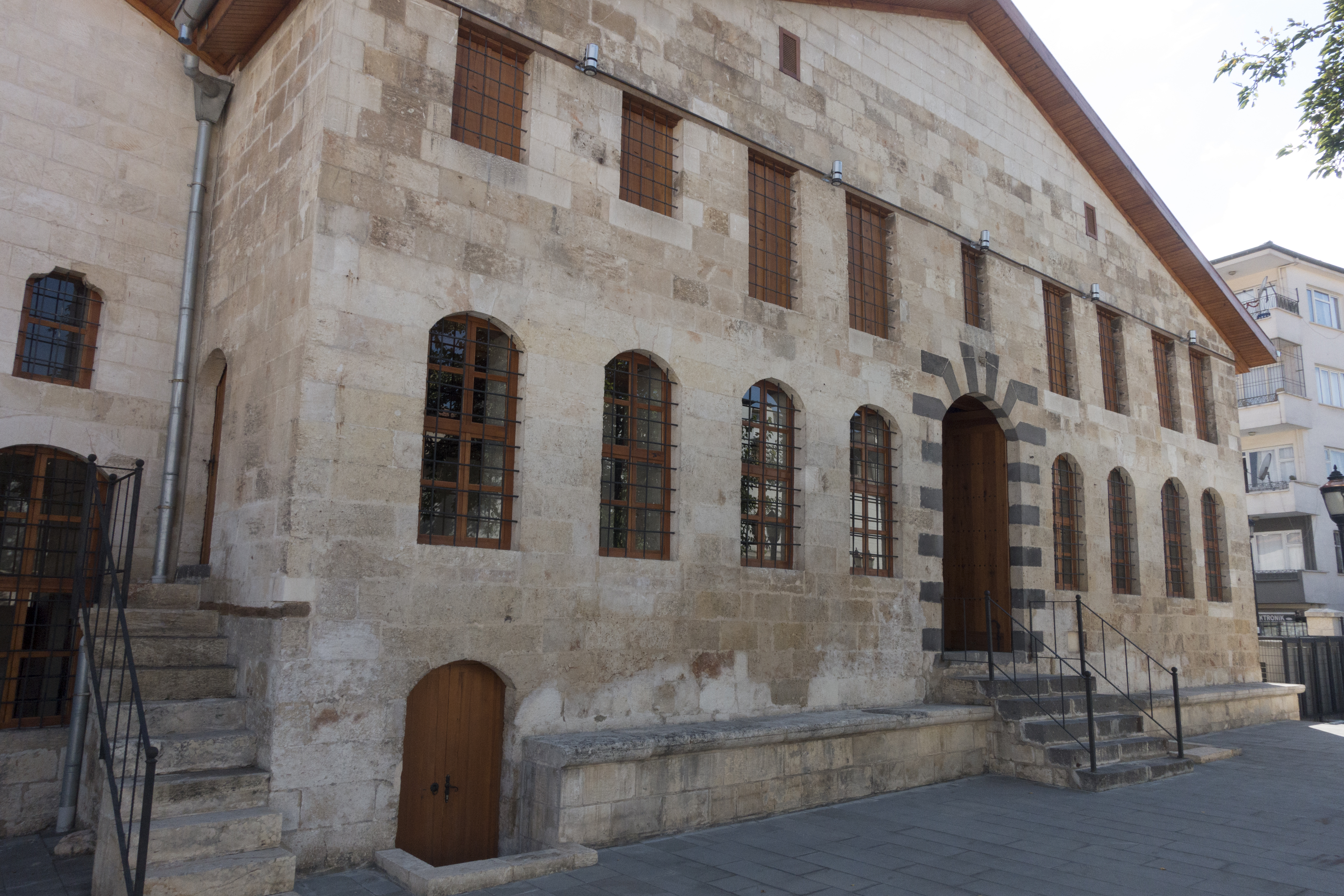
Gaziantep synagogue is rumoured to be 800 years old, although it may have been constructed in the 19th century.

Mother tongue composition of the city proper of Gaziantep in 1927 according to Turkish census
Languages	Speakers	%
Turkish	38,281	95.7
Arabic	873	2.2
Kurdish	491	1.2
Other	359	0.9
Total	40,004	100

== Culture ==
=== Cuisine ===
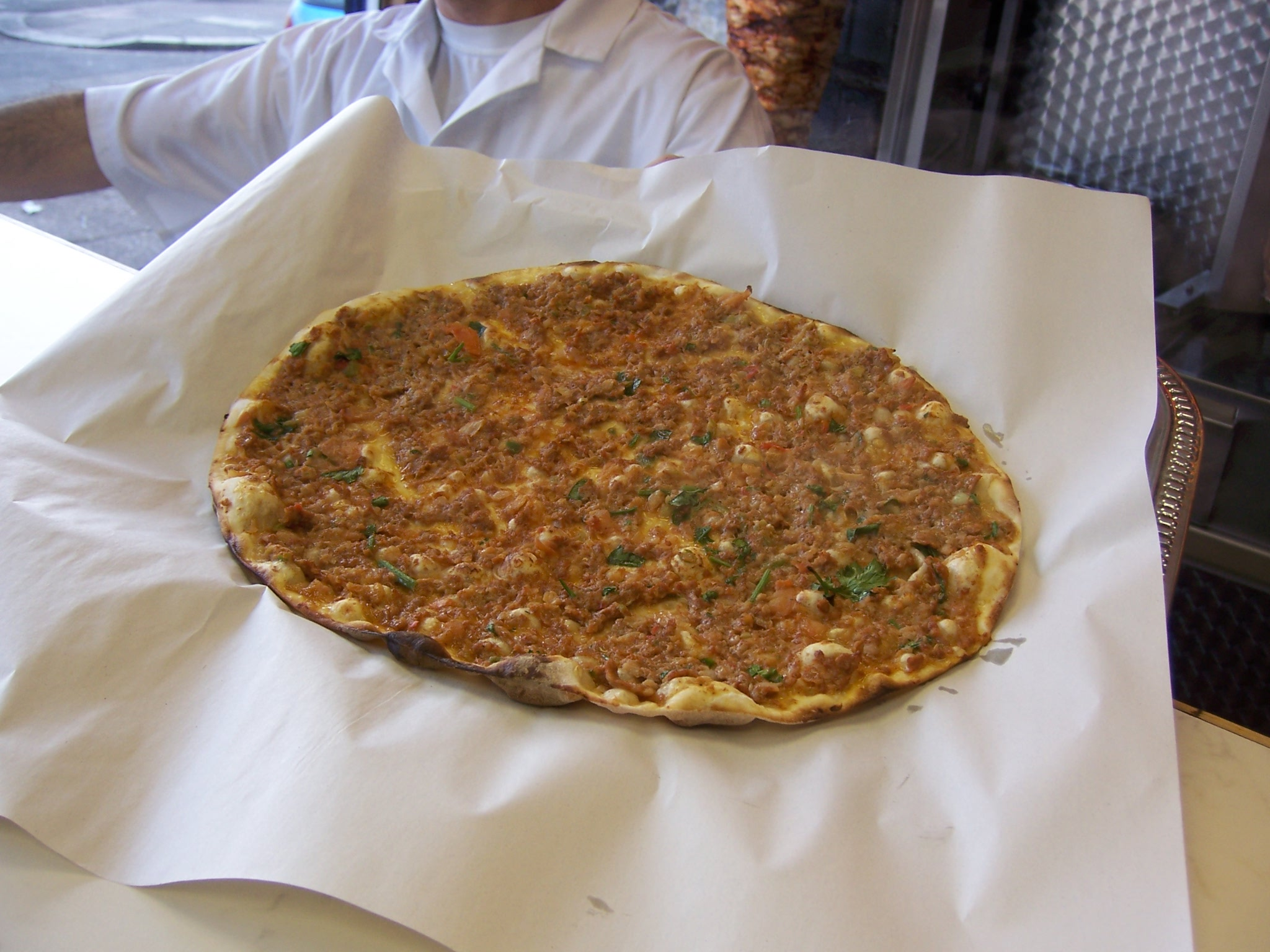
Lahmacun

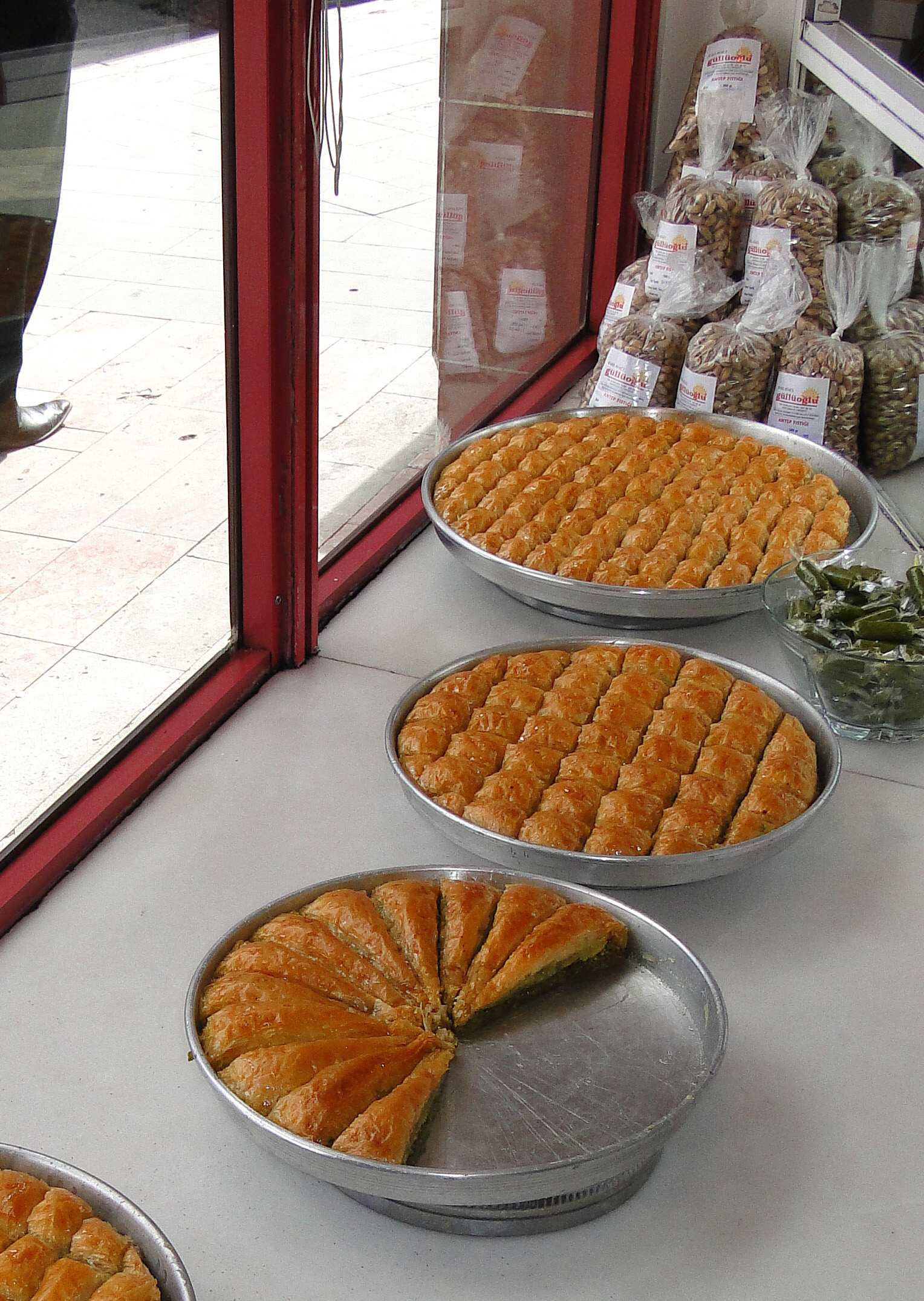
Baklava

Gaziantep is largely regarded as the city with the richest cuisine in Turkey. It was the first city in Turkey to be designated as a City of Gastronomy by UNESCO in 2015. In 2013, Gaziantep baklava became the first Turkish product with a European protected designation of origin and geographical indication.

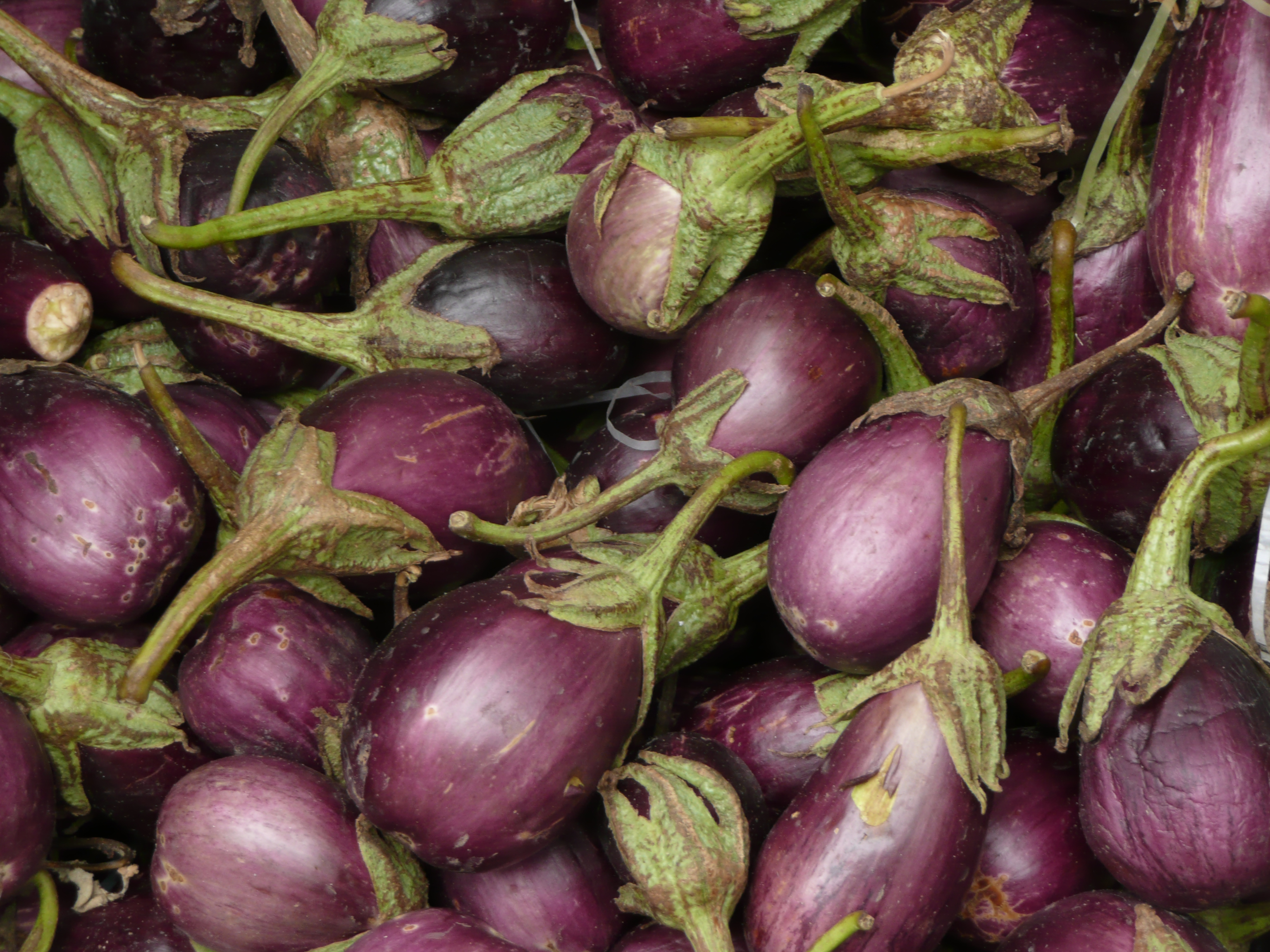
Dolmalık balcan (Turkish: Dolmalık patlıcan) is a variant of smaller eggplants that are specifically used for dolmas.

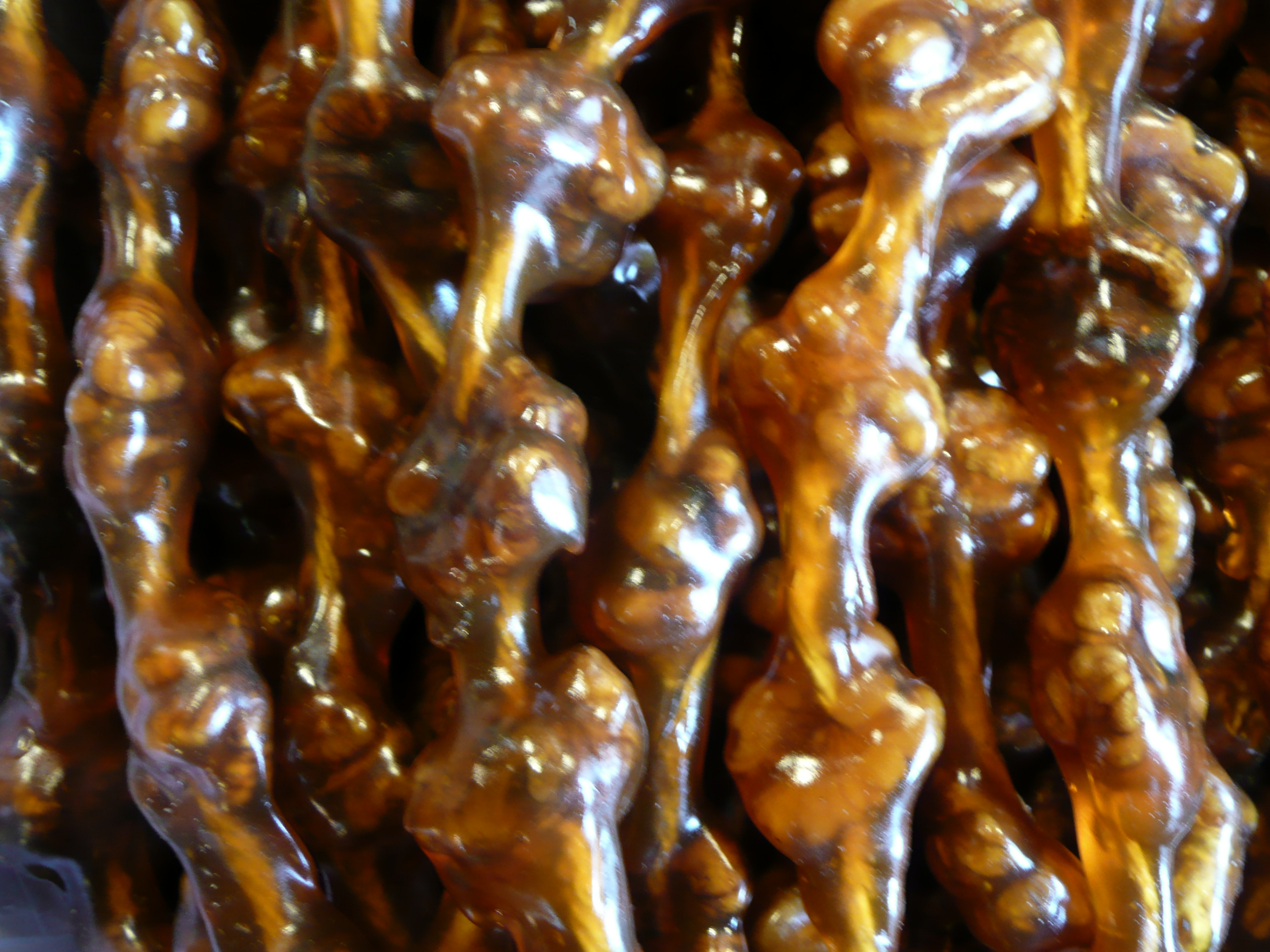
Sucuk

The cuisine of Aintab was attested to be "rich" by many travellers throughout the centuries. 19th-century British traveller noted:

"The padishah himself would do well to visit Aintab, just to taste the rich food to be found there."

Types of kofta (Turkish: köfte; Gaziantep dialect: küfte) include içli küfte (lit. 'stuffed kofta'), sini küfte, yoğurtlu küfte, yağlı küfte (lit. 'greasy kofta'), tahinli küfte, pendir ekmekli küfte (lit. 'kofta with bread and cheese'), and more. Some koftas do not include any meat such as yapma and malhıtalı küfte (lit. 'lentil kofta').

Pilafs in the Aintab cuisine often accompany the main dish and are not the main course alone. Traditionally, bulgur is used for the pilafs. The bulgur pilafs can include orzo (Şehriyeli bulgur pilavı; Şʿāreli burgul pilov) or ground beef (Kıymalı aş or Meyhane pilavı, lit. 'tavern pilaf').

There are several types of exclusively-Armenian soups in Aintab cuisine. These include vardapet soup and omız zopalı.

Vegetable dishes of Aintab often include meat but can be vegan or vegetarian as well. These include dorgama (doğrama), moussaka, bezelye, bakla, kuru fasulye, mutanya, türlü, and kabaklama. Dolma is a very common dish, different variants of which are cooked. One is kış dolması (lit. 'winter dolma'), for which dried vegetables, such as squash, eggplants, and peppers are used.

Common sweets include bastık and sucuk.

As of 2025, Gaziantep holds 107 registered geographical indications and patents granted by the Turkish Patent and Trademark Office, most of them food-related.

BBC called pistachios "the single most important ingredient" in the cuisine of Gaziantep, remains of pistachios dating back to the 3rd millennium BC have been found in an archeological site within 50 kilometers of the city.

=== Local Turkish dialect ===
The local Turkish dialect of Gaziantep is classified as a part of the Western Turkish dialects based on phonetic and grammatical similarities. The dialect carries influences mainly from Armenian and Arabic. The local Turkish dialect of Gaziantep is an integral part of the native identity of the city and is being preserved through often humorous plays by theatrical troupes, such as Çeled Uşaglar (lit. naughty children).

=== Museums ===
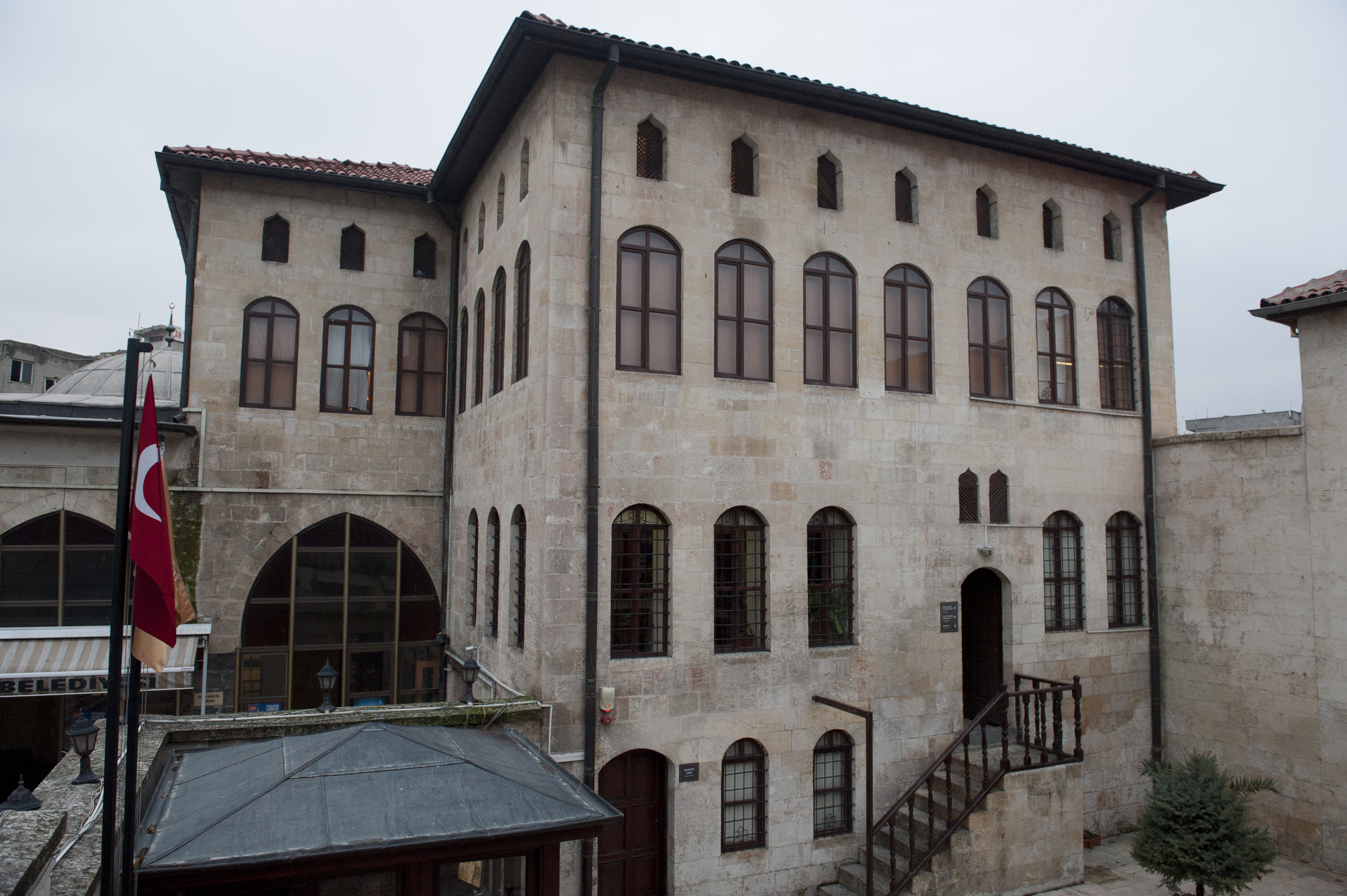
Gaziantep Mevlevi Culture and Foundation Works Museums about the Sufi whirling dervishes of Gaziantep

The Gaziantep Museum of Archaeology has collections of ceramic pieces from the Neolithic Age; various objects, figures and seals from the Chalcolithic and Bronze Ages; stone and bronze objects, jewellery, ceramics, coins, glass objects, mosaics and statues from the Assyrian-Babylonian, Hittite, Urartu, Greek Persian, Roman, Commagene, and Byzantine periods.

The Zeugma Mosaic Museum houses mosaics from Zeugma and other mosaics, a total of 1,700 square metres (18,000 sq ft). It opened to the public on 9 September 2011.

The Hasan Süzer Ethnography Museum, a restored late-Ottoman stone building, has the old life style decoration and collections of various weapons, documents, instruments used in the defence of the city as well as the photographs of local resistance heroes. It was originally built in 1906 as the home of Garouj Karamanoukian.

Some of the other historical remains are the Zeugma (also called Belkıs in Turkish), and Kargamış ruins by the town of Nizip and slightly more to the north, Rumkale.

Yesemek Quarry and Sculpture Workshop is an open-air museum located in the village known by the same name, 30 km (19 mi) south of the town of Islahiye. It is the largest open-air sculpture workshop in the Near East and the ruins in the area date back to the Hittites.

The Gaziantep Defence Museum: before you enter the Panorama Museum located within the Gaziantep Castle, you encounter the statues of three local heroes Molla Mehmet Karayılan, Şehit Mehmet Kâmil and Şahin Bey at the entrance. As you enter the museum, you hear the echoes: "I am from Antep. I am a hawk (Şahin)." The Gaziantep War Museum, in a historic Antep house (also known as the Nakıpoğlu House) is dedicated to the memory of the 6,317 who died defending the city, becoming symbols of Turkey's national unity and resolve for maintaining independence. The story of how the Battle of Antep is narrated with audio devices and chronological panels.

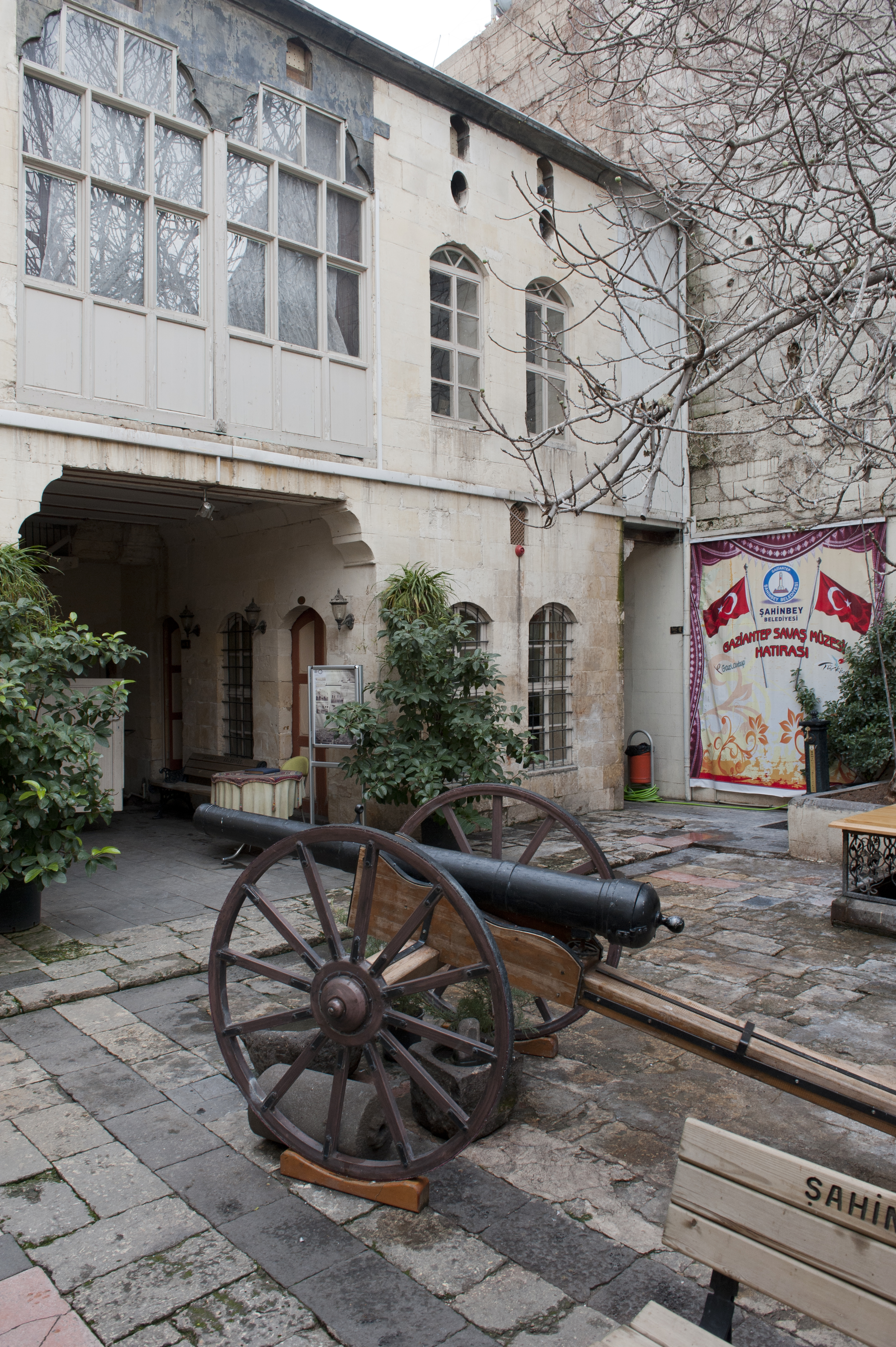
Gaziantep War Museum Courtyard

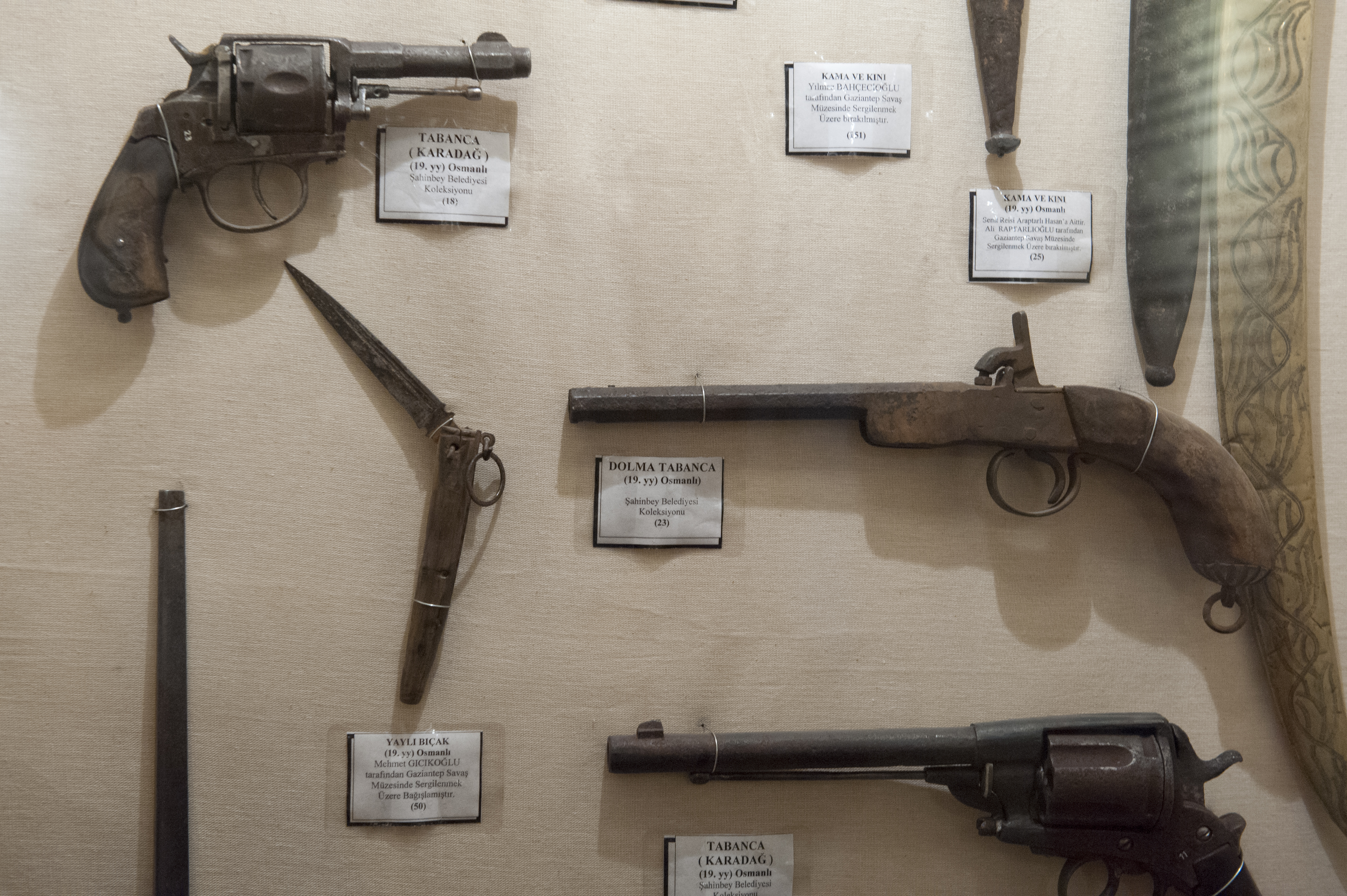
Gaziantep War Museum Arms display

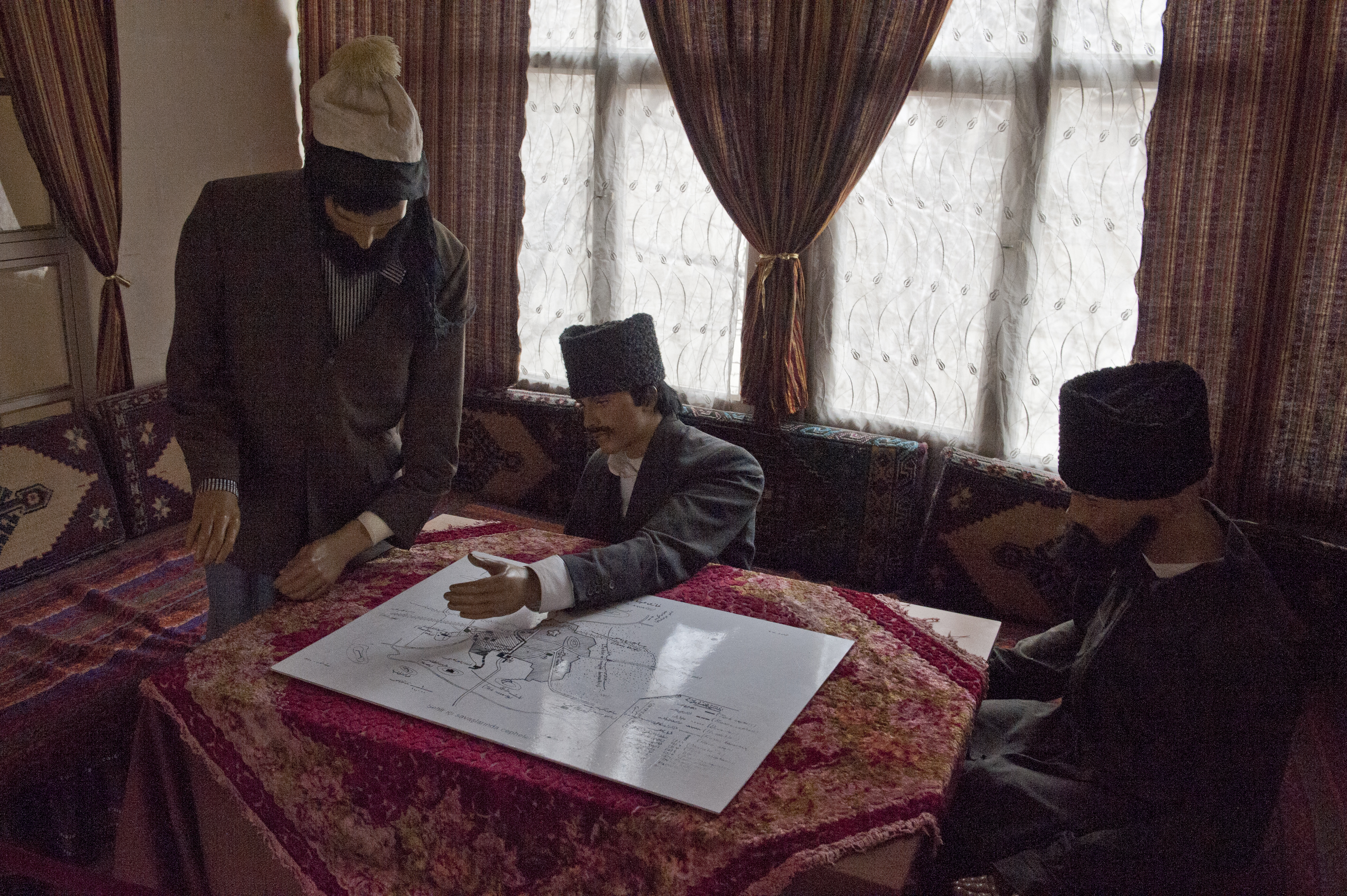
Gaziantep War Museum Strategy

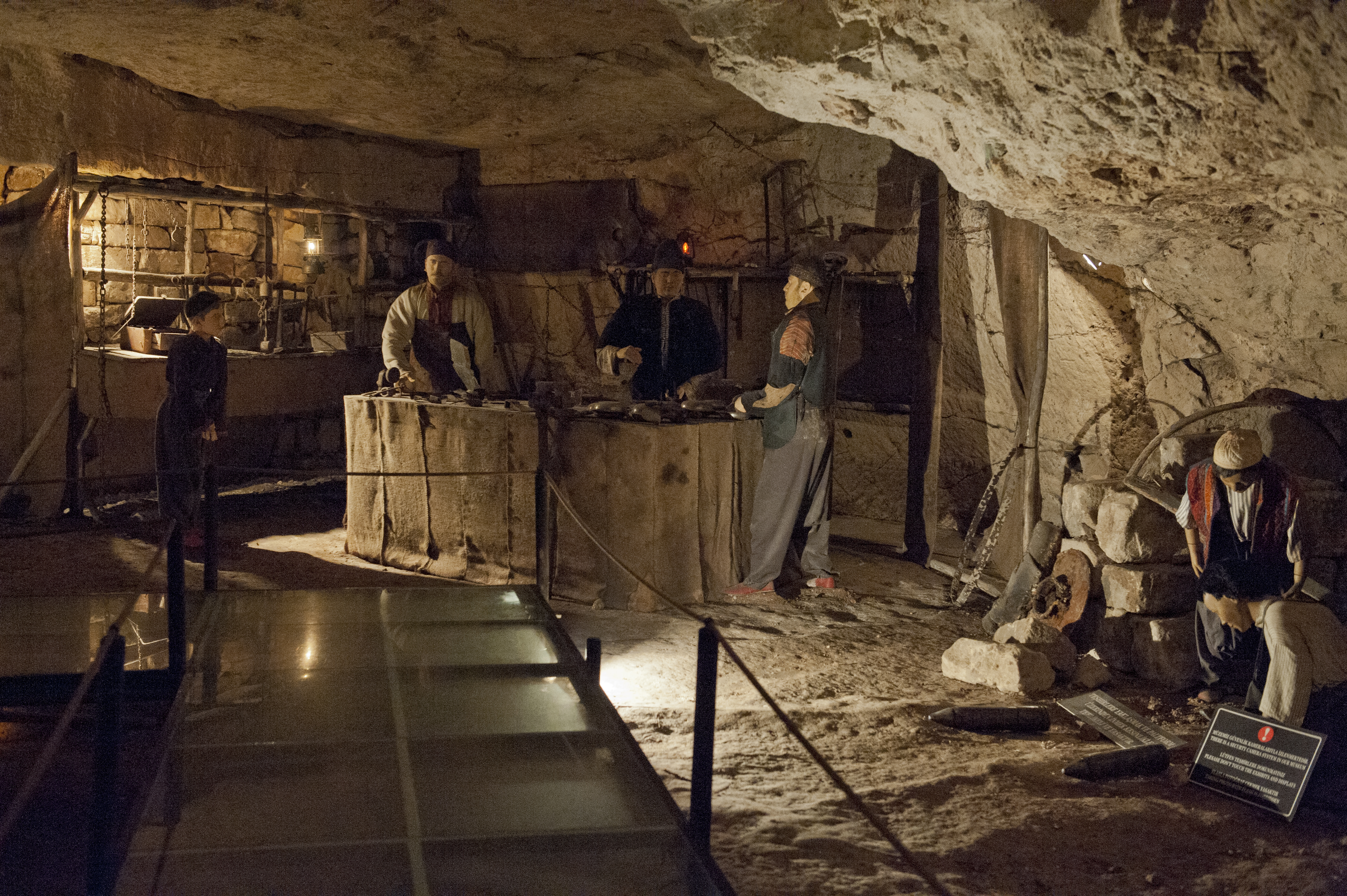
Gaziantep War Museum Smithy

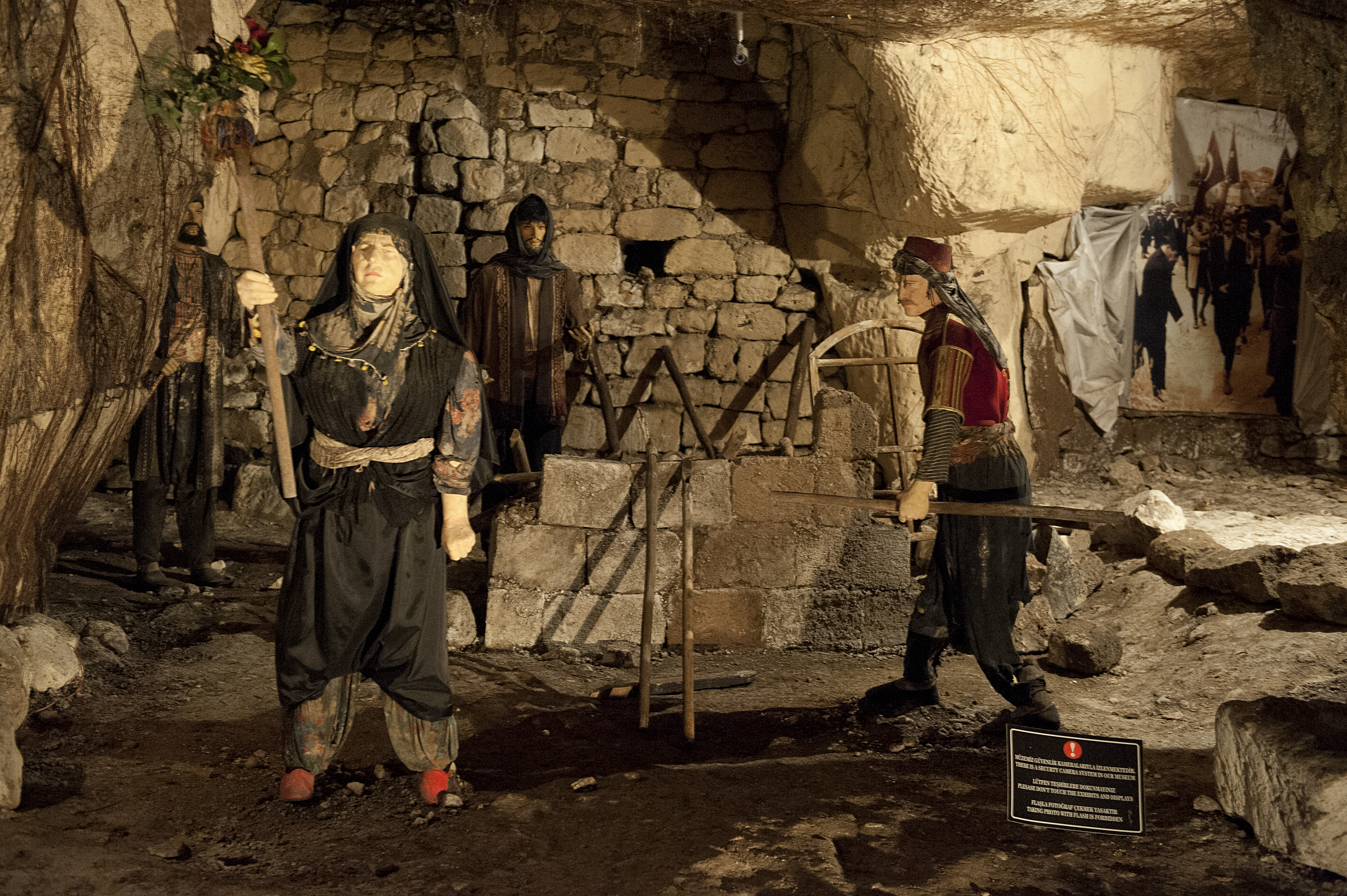
Gaziantep War Museum Mining

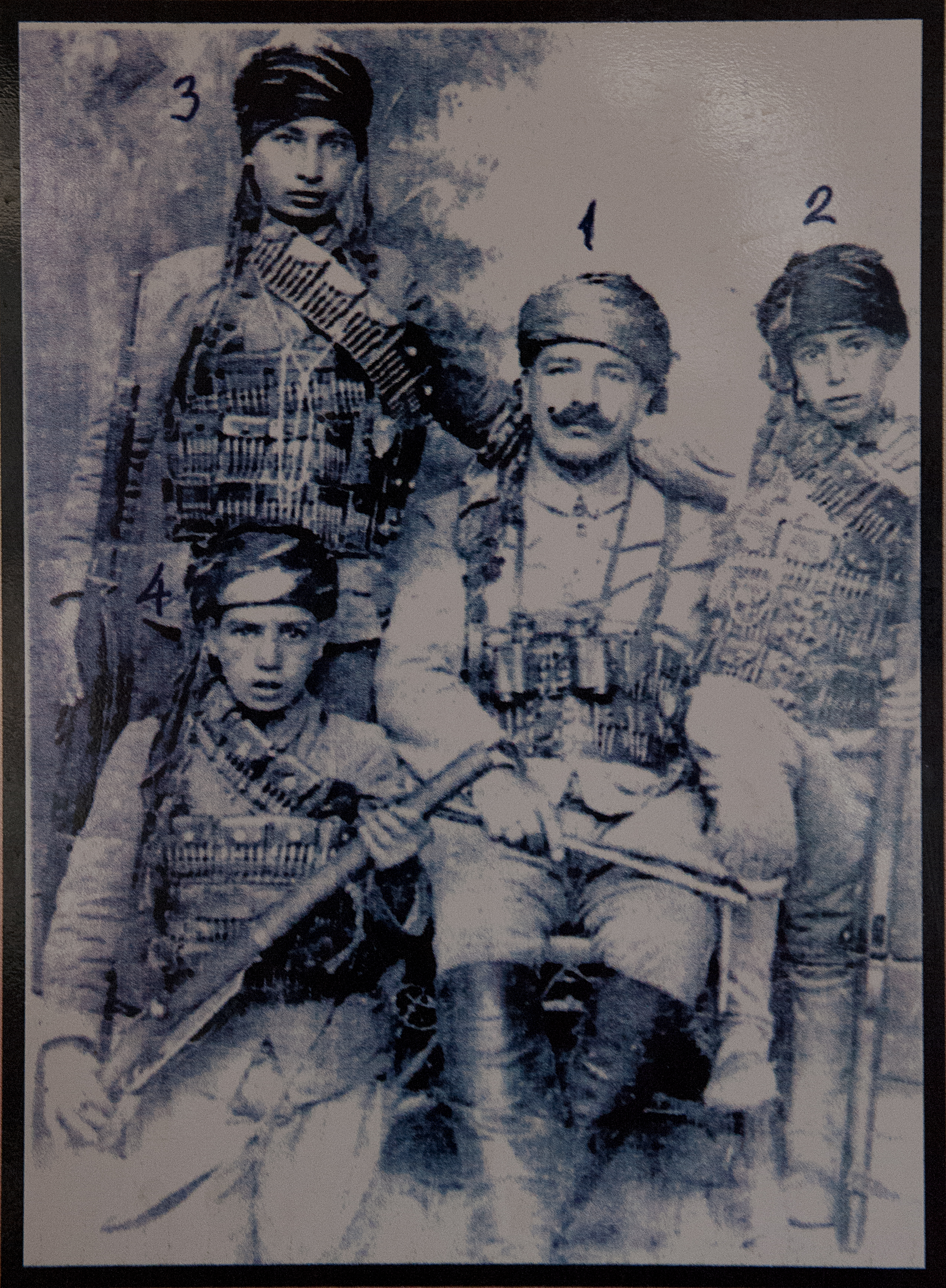
Gaziantep War Museum Children at war

Gaziantep Mevlevi Lodge Foundation Museum

The Antep Mevlevi Lodge in 1638 as a Mevlevi monastery. The dervish lodge is part of the mosque's külliye (Islamic-Ottoman social complex centred around a mosque). It is entered via a courtyard which opens off the courtyard of the mosque. In 2007, the building was opened as the Gaziantep Mevlevi Culture and Foundation Works Museums.

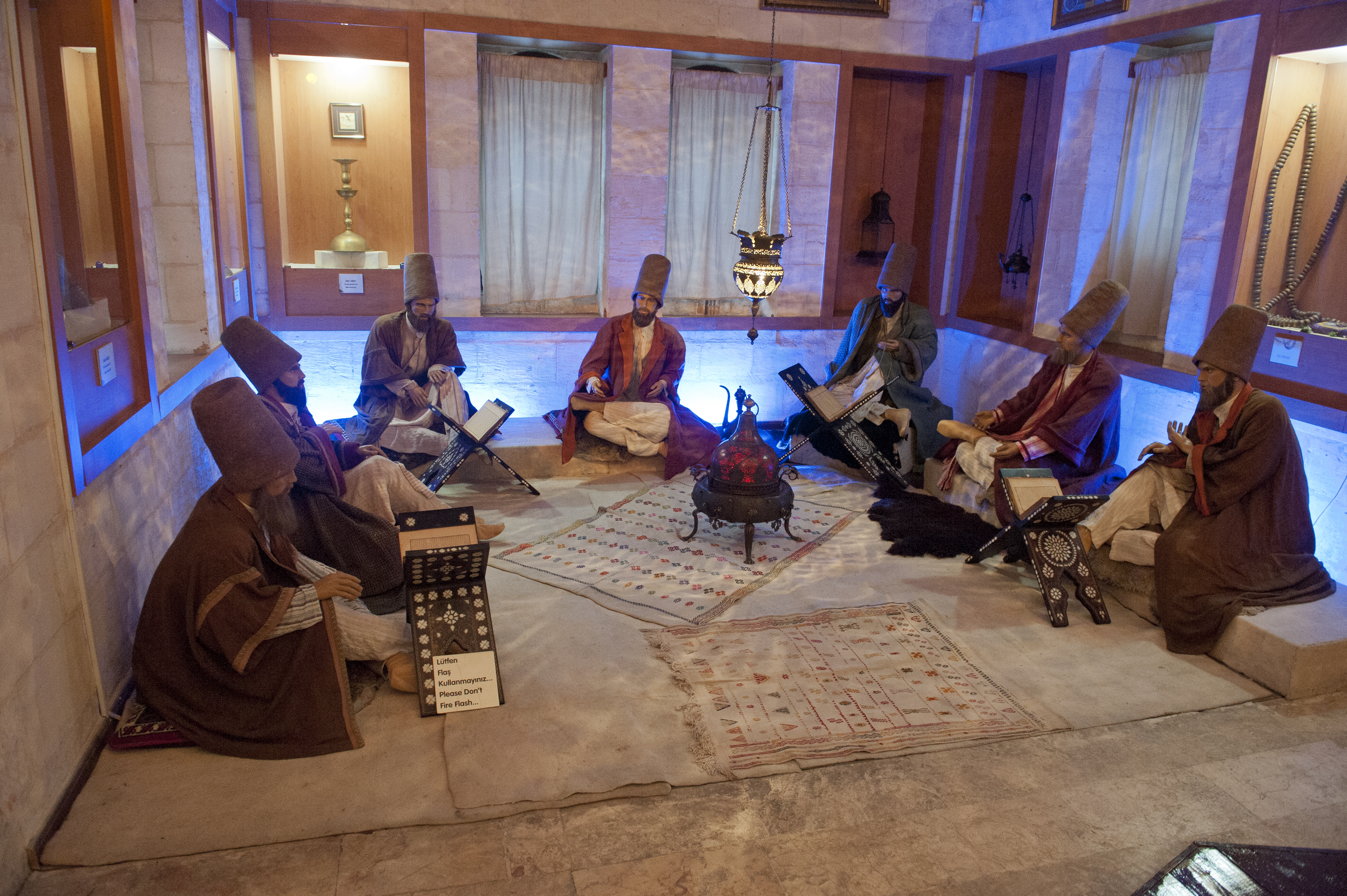
Gaziantep Mevlevi Museum Study group

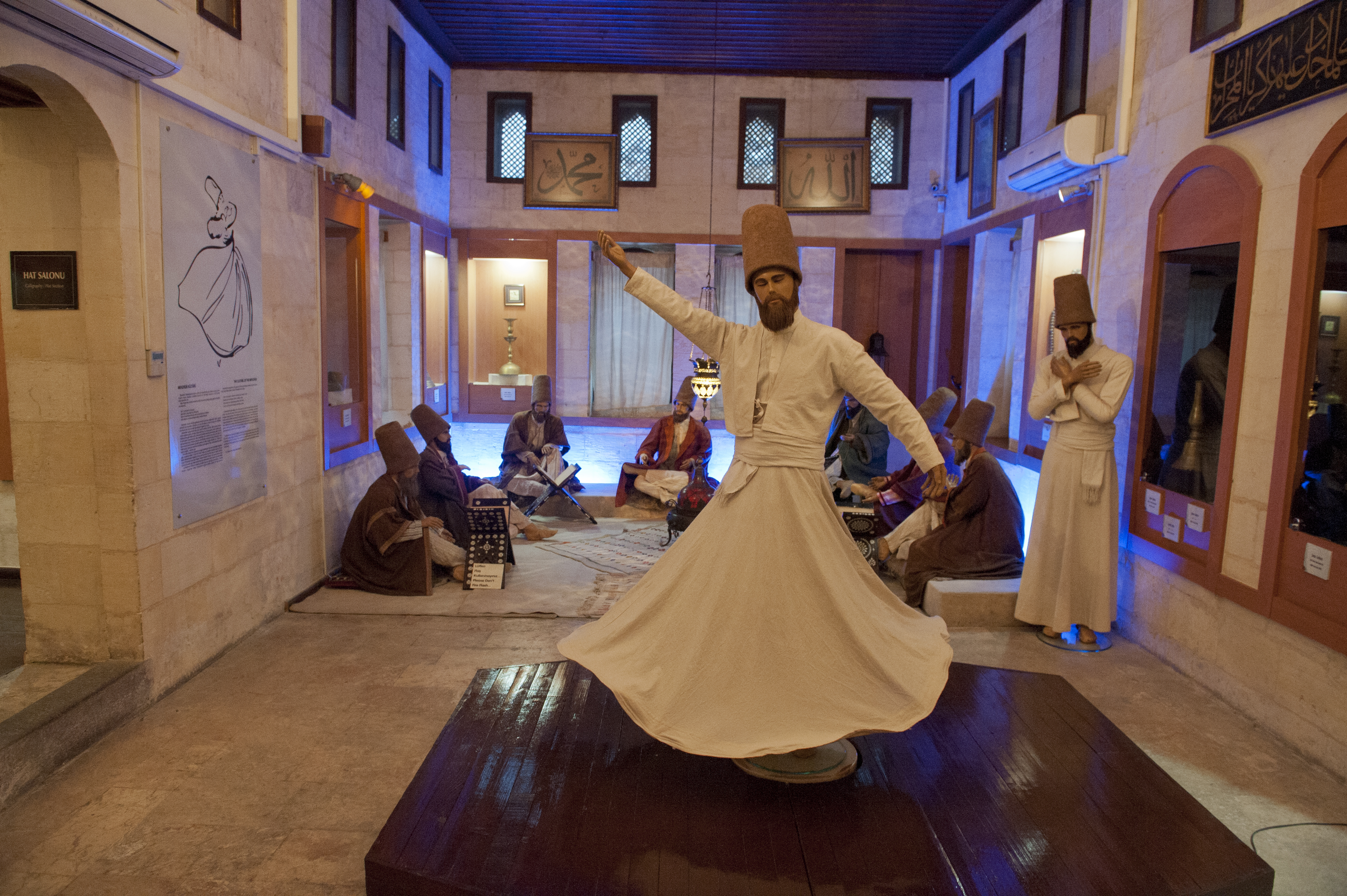
Gaziantep Mevlevi Museum Whirling

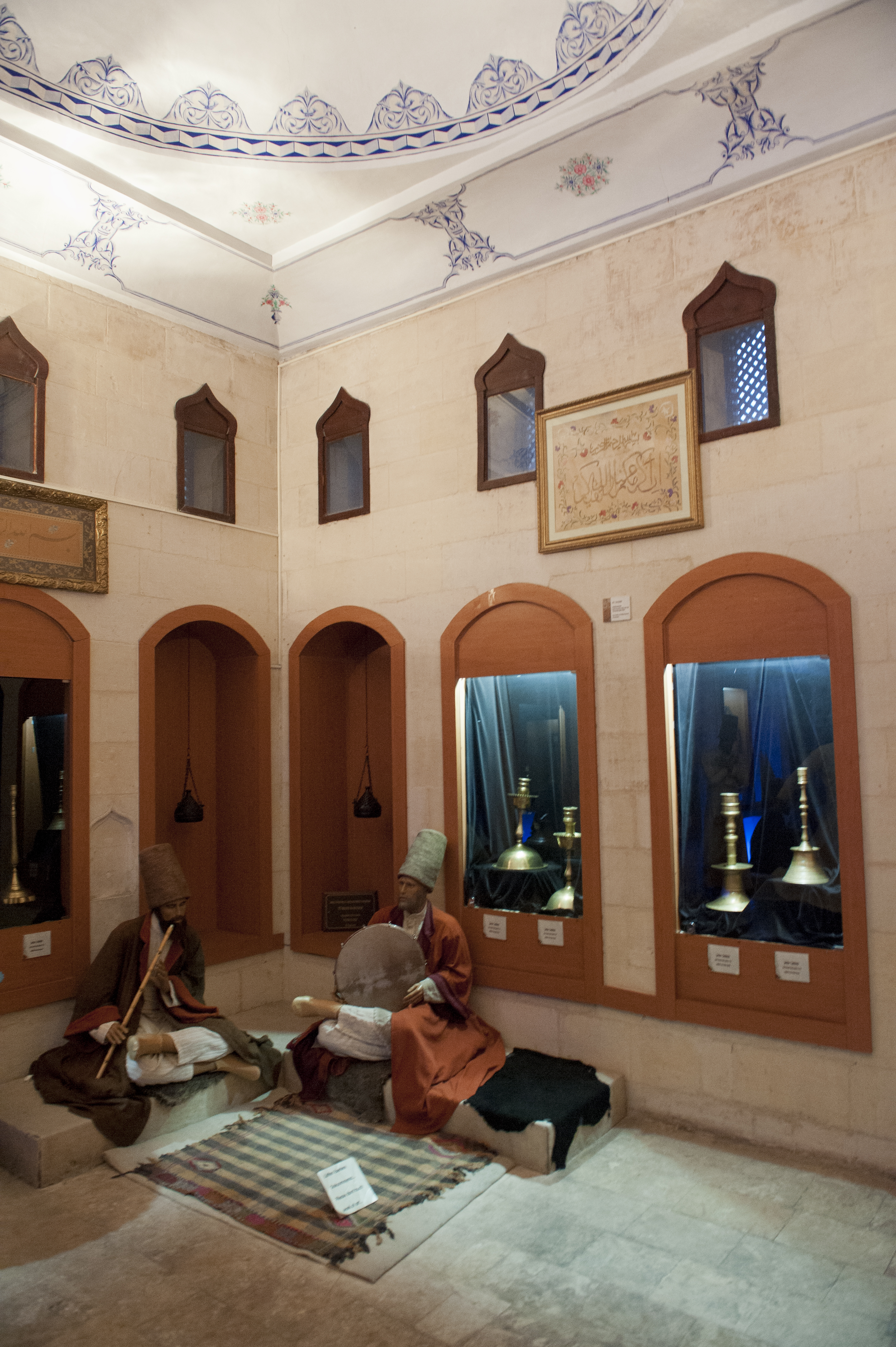
Gaziantep Mevlevi Museum Musicians

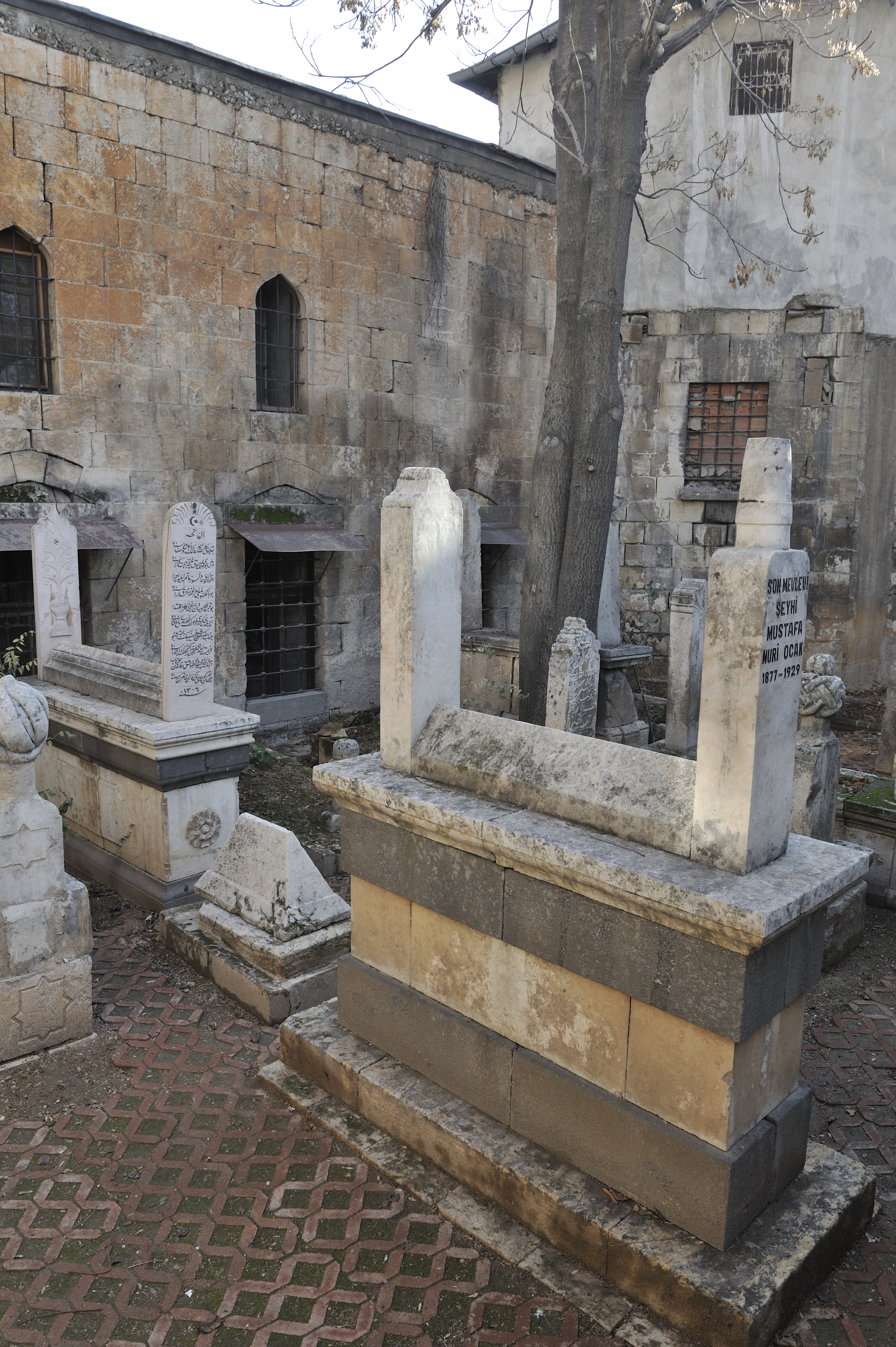
Gaziantep Mevlevi Museum Graves

Emine Göğüş Cuisine Museum Gaziantep is known for its cuisine and food culture. A historical stone house built in 1904 has been restored and turned into the Emine Göğüş Cuisine Museum. The museum opened as part of the celebrations for the 87th anniversary of Gaziantep's liberation from French occupation.

=== Historical sites ===
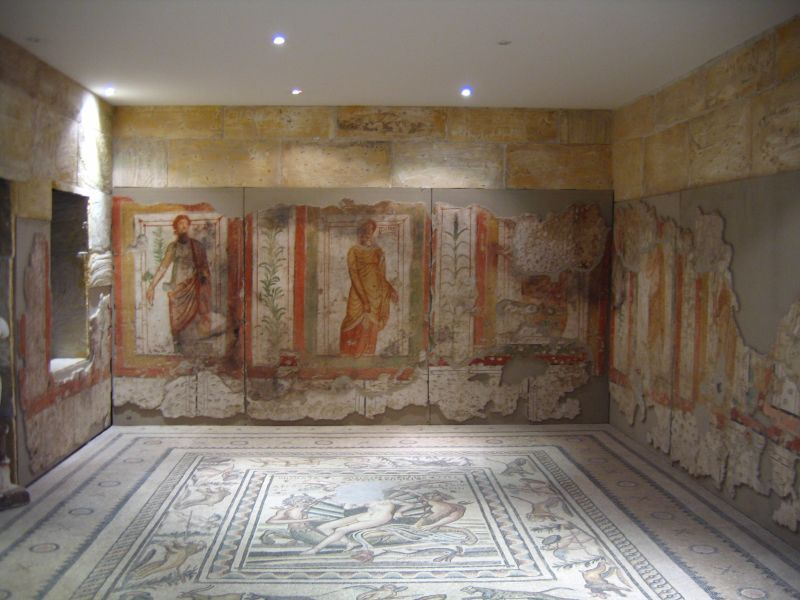
Wall paintings and floor mosaics in Zeugma

==== Places of worship ====
Liberation Mosque, the former Armenian Cathedral of the Holy Mother of God (Surp Asdvadzadzin), was converted into a mosque after the liberation of the city from the occupying French forces following the Franco-Turkish War (1918–1921). The French forces which occupied the city between 1918 and 1921 included the French Armenian Legion.

Boyacı Mosque, a historic mosque in the Şahinbey district, was built by Kadı Kemalettin in 1211 and completed in 1357. It has one of the world's oldest wooden minbars which is elaborately adorned with Koranic verses, stars and geometric patterns. Its minaret is considered one of the symbols of the city.

Şirvani Mosque (Şirvani Mehmet Efendi Mosque), also called İki Şerefeli Cami, is one of the oldest mosques of Gaziantep, located in the Seferpaşa district. It was built by Şirvani Mehmet Efendi.

Ömeriye Mosque, a mosque in the Düğmeci district. Tradition states that it was first built during the period of the Islamic Caliphate under the second Caliph, Omar (hence its name), which would make it the oldest known mosque in Gaziantep. The modern mosque was restored at the site in 1850. It is known for its black and red marble mihrab.

Şeyh Fethullah Mosque, a historic mosque built in 1563 and located in Kepenek. It has an adjoining hammam and a medrese.

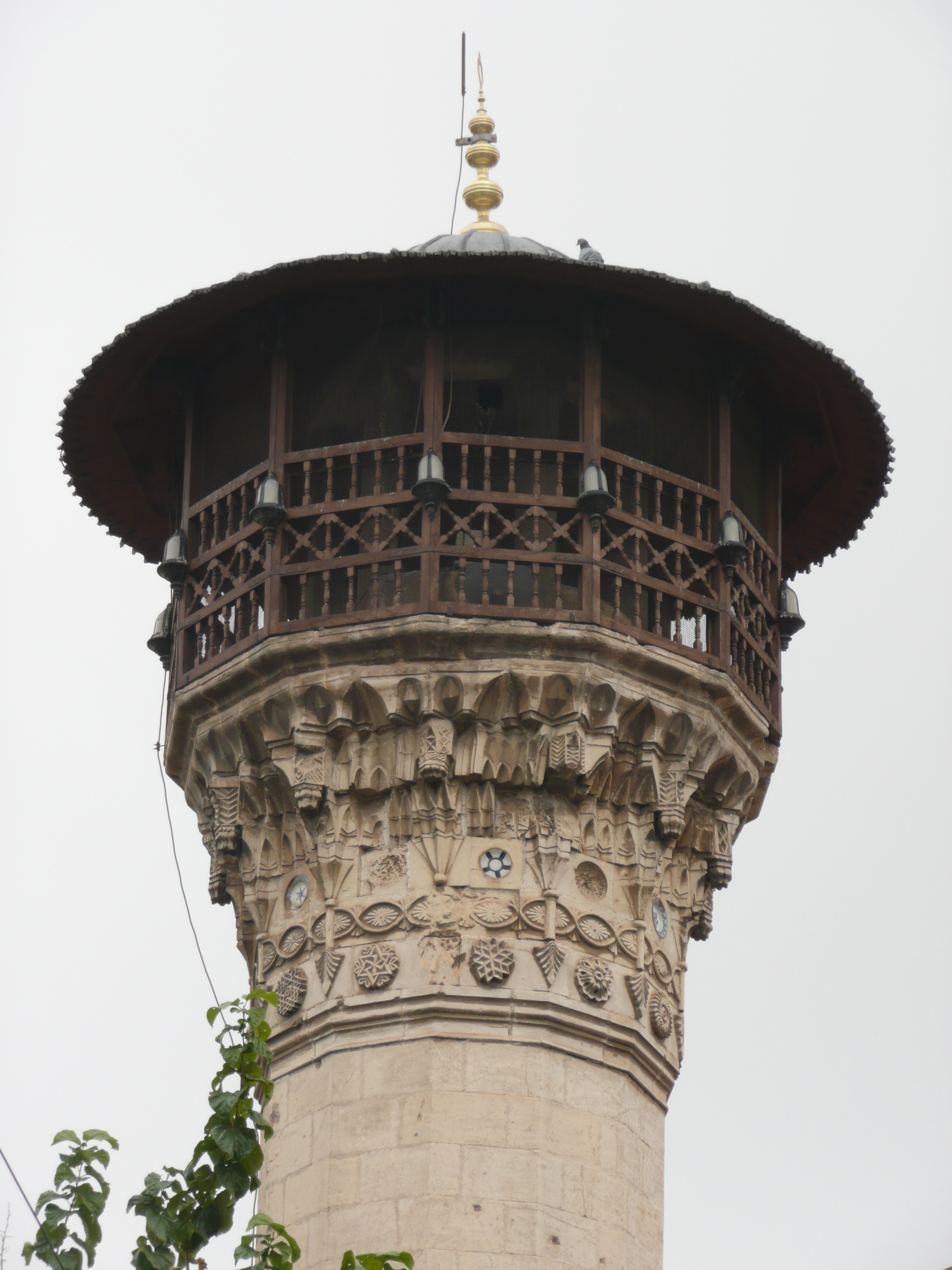
Minaret of the Boyacı Camii Mosque

Nuri Mehmet Pasha Mosque, a mosque in Çukur built in 1786 by nobleman Nuri Mehmet Pasha. Between 1958 and 1968, it was changed into museum but was reinstated as a mosque after an extensive restoration.

Ahmet Çelebi Mosque, a mosque in Ulucanlar that was built by Hacı Osman, in 1672. It is noted for its elaborate wooden interior.

Tahtani Mosque, a wooden mosque located in Şahinbey, that was built in 1557. The mosque has a unique red marble mihrab.

Alaüddevle Mosque (Ali Dola Mosque), built by Dulkadir bey Alaüddevle Bozkurt. Its construction started in 1479 and was completed in 1515. It has been restored recently with the addition of a new entrance.

Ali Nacar Mosque, a mosque in Yaprak, Şehitkamil, is one of the biggest mosques in Gaziantep, originally built by Ali Nacar. It was enlarged in 1816.

Eyüpoğlu Mosque, a mosque built by the local Islamic saint Eyüboğlu Ahmet during the 14th century. There has been a major restoration, so much so that the present structure hardly resembles the original building.

Kendirli Church, a church that was built in 1860 by means of the assistance of French missionaries and Napoleon III. It is a Catholic Armenian church. It has a rectangular plan and was built through white cut stones on a foundation of black cut stone within a large garden.

==== Bazaars ====
Zincirli Bedesten is the Ottoman-era covered bazaar of Gaziantep and was built in 1781 by Hüseyin Pasha of Darende. From records, it is known that there was formerly an epigraph on the south gate written by Kusuri; however, this inscription is not in place today. This bazaar was used as a wholesale market hall for meat, fruit and vegetables.

Bakırcılar çarşısi is the coppersmith bazaar of Gaziantep. This trade has existed in the region for over 500 years. The bazaar is part of the official culture route designed to help visitors discover the traditions and culture of the city.

==== Inns ====
Anatolia Inn The exact date of the inn's (caravanserai) construction is unknown, but it is estimated to have been built in the early 19th century. It is a two-storey building with two courtyards. It is said to have been built by Muhsinzade Hadji Mehmet Bey in 1892. The inn was repaired in 1985 and parts of the top floor were rebuilt.

Kürkçü Inn Classic Ottoman Inn in Boyacı built in 1890.

Old Wheat Inn The original building was constructed by Mustafa Ağa in 1640 to provide an income for the dervish lodge, but was completely destroyed in a fire. The exact construction date of the present building is unknown; however the architectural style suggests the 19th century.

Şire Inn The building is built on a rectangular plan and contains many motifs of classical Ottoman inn architecture. It was built with evenly cut stones and the pitched roof is covered by tiles.

Tobacco Inn This inn has no epigraph showing the dates of construction or renovation, but according to historical data, the estimated date of construction is the late 17th century. Ownership was passed to Hüseyin Ağa, son of Nur Ali Ağa, in the early 19th century.

Yüzükçü Inn The construction date of this inn is unknown. The epigraph on the main gate of the inn is dated 1800, but the building apparently had been built earlier and was repaired at this date. The first owners of the inn were Asiye, the daughter of Battal Bey and Emine Hatun, the daughter of Hadji Osman Bey.

==== Other ====
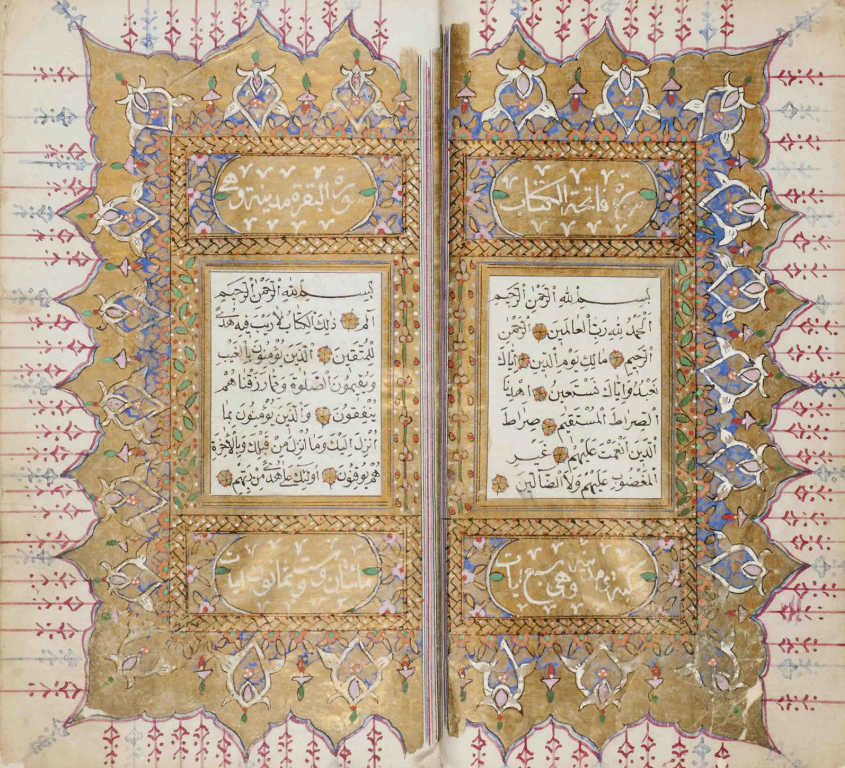
Qur'an assembled in Aintab. Signed by Ali bin Mustafa, known as Baqan Al-yajizadeh, who was a student of Muhammad Efendi Dallakzadeh, dated 23 March 1857.

Zeugma is an ancient city which was established at the shallowest passable part of the river Euphrates, within the boundaries of the present-day Belkıs village in Gaziantep Province. Due to the strategic character of the region in terms of military and commerce since antiquity (Zeugma was the headquarters of an important Roman legion, the Legio IV Scythica, near the border with Parthia) the city has maintained its importance for centuries, also during the Byzantine period.

Gaziantep Castle, also known as Gala (lit. 'the castle'), located in the centre of the city displays the historic past and architectural style of the city. Although the history of castle is not fully known, as a result of the excavations conducted there, Bronze Age settlement layers are thought to exist under the section existing on the surface of the soil.

Pişirici Kastel, a "kastel" (fountain) which used to be a part of a bigger group of buildings, is thought to have been built in 1282. "Kastels" are water fountains built below ground, and they are structures peculiar to Gaziantep. They are places for ablution, prayer, washing and relaxation.

Old houses of Gaziantep, the traditional houses that are located in the old city: Eyüboğlu, Türktepe, Tepebaşı, Bostancı, Kozluca, Şehreküstü and Kale. They are made of locally found keymik rock and have an inner courtyard called the hayat, which is the focal point of the house.

Tahmis Coffee House, a coffee house that was built by Mustafa Ağa Bin Yusuf, a Turkmen ağa and flag officer, in 1635–1638, in order to provide an income for the dervish lodge. The building suffered two big fires in 1901 and 1903.

== Transportation ==
The city is served by Oğuzeli Airport, which has commercial flights to domestic and regional international destinations. The city is served by Turkish State Railways which operates the Gaziantep Railway Station in the city centre.

Gaziantep has a three line light rail system called the Gaziantep Tram. The Gaziantep Tram consists of three lines, is 35 km long and carries 75,000 passengers daily. The system opened in 2011 and was extended in 2012 and 2014.

Gaziray is a commuter rail line serving Gaziantep, Turkey. Being 25 km (16 mi) long, the line is the fourth largest commuter rail system in the country. The system is also a part of major upgrades along the Mersin-Adana-Osmaniye-Gaziantep railway corridor. There are a total of 16 stations on the 25.532 kilometres (15.865 mi) long Gaziray line, two of which are underground, all of which are suitable for disabled access.

Gaziray Suburban Railway Network Stations
Rank	Station	Connection	Class	Notes
1	Baspinar		Level	Gaziantep Organized Industrial Zone
2	OSB-3		Level	Gaziantep Organized Industrial Zone
3	OSB-4		Level	Gaziantep Organized Industrial Zone
4	Dolice		Level	Dolice (Dülük) Ancient City
5	Stadium		Level	Kalyon Stadium
6	Beylerbeyi		Level	
7	Fistiklik	Gaziantep Intercity Bus Terminal	Level	
8	Selimiye		Level	Kayaönü
9	Adliye		Underground	Gaziantep Courthouse, Şehitkamil State Hospital, TEDAŞ
10	Topraklik		Underground	
11	Mucahitler		Level	Dr. Ersin Arslan Training and Research Hospital, SANKO University Hospital, NCR International Hospital
12	Gaziantep	Gaziantep Central Railway Station - T1 - T3	Level	Zeugma Mosaic Museum
13	Golluce		Level	İnayet Topçuoğlu Hospital
14	Seyrantepe		Level	Küsget Industrial Zone
15	Mustafa Yavuz		Level	Küsget Industrial Zone
16	Taslica		Level	Oduncular Industrial Zone

== Education ==
As of 2025, there are 1,707 schools in Gaziantep, attended by over 700,000 students and with almost 35,000 teachers. Gaziantep Anatolian High School, founded in 1976, is a public school focusing on English language education. Gaziantep Science High School is a public boarding high school with a curriculum focused on natural sciences and mathematics. There are also a variety of high schools, private and public, including Gaziantep Fen Lisesi. Gaziantep College Foundation is one of the oldest colleges in the city.

The main campus of Gaziantep University is located 10 km (6 mi) away from the city center. The institution acquired state university status in 1987, but had already offered higher education since 1973 as an extension campus of the Middle East Technical University. It is one of the largest universities in Turkey, with 27,000 students. Hasan Kalyoncu University (Hasan Kalyoncu Üniversitesi) is a private university established in 2008. Currently, the university has five faculties, three institutes and three vocational schools. Zirve University (Zirve Üniversitesi) was a private university established in 2009. As of 2016, the university had five faculties. The university was closed by the government in 2016 and its facilities transferred to Gaziantep University. The youngest university in Gaziantep is Sanko University (Sanko Üniversitesi). Established in 2013, Sanko University is the first "thematic university" in Turkey.

== Sports ==
Club	Sport	Established	League	Venue
ALG Spor	Women's football	1998	Women's Football Super League	Batur Stadium
Gaziantepspor	Football	1969	Bölgesel Amatör Lig	New Gaziantep Stadium
Gazişehir Gaziantep F.K.	Football	1988	Süper Lig	New Gaziantep Stadium
Gazikentspor	Women's football	2006	Women's Second League	Gazikent Stadium
Gaziantep Büyükşehir Belediyespor (Played with sponsporship of Royal Halı since 2012)	Basketball	2007	Turkish Basketball League	Kamil Ocak Sports Hall
Gaziantep Polisgücü SK Men's, Women's Hockey	Hockey	2003	Turkish Hockey Super League	
Gaziantep Doruk SK	Hockey	2013	Turkish Hockey Super League	
Gaziantep Asyaspor	women's football	2021	Women's Football Super League	Aktoprak Football Field

Beslenspor has played in the Turkish Basketball League between 1986 and 1992 and presented Gaziantep at basketball once.

== Cityscape ==
The historical core of Gaziantep is located on the Alleben Creek to the north and with heights to the south. The location of the city among these heights was likely because of their defensibility.

Historically, the main trade axis was the route from the castle then going southeast along the road to Aleppo. A number of hans were built along this street. Due to the hot climate, the city's streets were very narrow in order to maximize shade from the buildings. Orientation of buildings was important so they could not see into each other's courtyards (an important private space, especially for women) and so that they would not block sunlight from neighboring houses.

Generally, the city's population was organized according to ethno-religious groups who lived close together in the same neighborhood. Around the time of World War I, the city's population was divided between Muslims in the east and non-Muslims (mostly Armenians) in the west. Muslims lived in the Karagöz, Çukur, Tıslaki, and Şekeroğlu districts; Armenians lived in the Akyol and Bey districts; and Jews lived in the Düğmeci and Karagöz districts.

An early city planning effort took place in 1891 under Mustafa Ağa, the first mayor of Gaziantep, involving a city plan and province map. According to Kuyucu and Özer, though, the resulting maps and plans are unavailable. Another early city plan for Gaziantep was drawn up by Barsumyan and Nazaryan in the early 1920s, during the Turkish War of Independence. The Barsumyan-Nazaryan plan included an airport for the city but omitted any railway connections. During this period, because the Jewish and Armenian communities had left the city during the war period, the city did not expand into new areas; instead, now-vacant neighborhoods were used to meet new demand.

=== The Jansen plan (1938) ===
In the first years of the Republic of Turkey, new city planning laws were enacted requiring all major cities to have development plans. In 1938, the Gaziantep municipality requested that Hermann Jansen draw up a plan for the city. The resulting Jansen plan was the first large-scale city planning initiative in Gaziantep, and many of its proposals were ultimately put into action.

The Jansen plan sought to preserve the existing urban character of Gaziantep while also planning new areas outside the traditional core. It mainly focused on new development on the north, south, and west sides of the city. New industrial zones were drawn up along important transportation arteries, particularly the Nizip and Aleppo roads. The most important was a 33-hectare industrial zone on the north side of town, which was to be connected to the railway network. The new industrial area was specifically chosen to be on the northeast because the prevailing wind direction is from the northwest, so this way air pollution would not be blown over the city.

The plan introduced several important changes to the city's transportation network. One of the most important was the addition of a rail line to connect Gaziantep to the national rail system. Up to now, Turkish railway construction had ignored Gaziantep (partly because of its mountainous surroundings); a national railway plan also introduced in 1938 left Gaziantep unconnected to the rail network. The Jansen plan represented the first major proposal to construct a railway to Gaziantep. Jansen wanted to put the train station on the north side of the city, for multiple reasons. First, because the topography on the north side is flatter; and second, because putting a railway on the south side would separate the old town from the new planned residential areas further south, which Jansen wanted to avoid.

Jansen also planned significant changes to the city's streets, opening up several new boulevards and widening pre-existing streets to help make a continuous transportation network. He proposed combining the Narlı and Aleppo roads into İsmet İnönü Caddesi, which was to be the main transportation axis of the city. The existing commercial axis along the Aleppo road, lined with hans and marketplaces, was to be expanded with new commercial buildings along the new İnönü Cd. The plan also sought to create a SW-NE axis connecting the Kilis and Nizip roads by way of İstasyon Caddesi in the north and Atatürk Caddesi in the west; this axis would also be connected to İnönü Cd. Two important pre-existing streets in the old town, Suburcu Cd and Eski Saray Cd, would also be expanded and connected with these other streets. Finally, besides road and rail, Jansen also proposed the construction of an airport on the west side of town.

One of the most important features of the Jansen Plan was the designation of a green belt along Alleben Creek, running east–west across the entire city, where no construction was to take place. This would provide a large open recreational area. Jansen also proposed a large area to the north of the creek to be used for sports fields and a hippodrome, although these were never built.

The Jansen plan zoned for new residential areas to the south of the old city. This may have been done to follow the pre-existing main axis along the southbound Aleppo road. It may have also been because Jansen wanted the existing houses of the old city to be visible from the south. He wanted to build new residential areas in a similar fashion, with two-story houses arranged on parallel streets that followed the slope of hills. In order to provide space for the southward residential expansion, Jansen proposed that the pre-existing cemetery on the south side of town be moved to a new planned location in the northeast.

To the northwest of the old city, Jansen wanted to build one-story houses among vineyards in a low-density agricultural area. The proposed workers' quarter, in the northeast near the planned industrial zone, was to follow a similar plan, with low-cost single-story houses.

For the city's new administrative buildings, Jansen chose to develop the Çukurbostan area, located in the old city center but with some vacant space available. In a departure from his typical policy of not modifying the old urban fabric, also proposed demolishing some existing buildings and altering the pre-existing street layout to accommodate this new construction.

==== Impact ====
Many elements of the Jansen plan were ultimately put into action, and it had a significant influence on how Gaziantep was built during the 20th century. It especially shaped the city's transport network: the construction of a rail line on the north side, the opening of new transportation axes such as İnönü Cd, and the expansion of existing roads were all realized. The expansion of commercial areas along the old Aleppo road led to the development of İnönü Cd as one of the city's main commercial axes, a role it still plays today. The airport area he proposed, however, was never built – in the 1950s, as urbanization and population growth created new demand, the area was turned into a residential zone instead.

The planned residential expansion to the south did take place, as did the proposed relocation of the cemetery to the northeast, but ultimately the main direction of residential expansion shifted to the northwest instead. This is partly because the hilly area to the south is less conducive for construction. The industrial zone on the northeast was built, but the adjacent workers' quarter never materialized. Although the recreational areas to the north were never built, the Alleben green belt became an important green space in the city, and it remains to this day (although some of it has since been turned over for new construction). Jansen's recommendation of low-rise development also succeeded at preserving the silhouette of the city until the 1970s.

One failing of the Jansen plan was that it significantly underestimated the population growth of the city during the next 50 years, particularly after 1945. This lack led to the growth of uncontrolled, unplanned settlements in the city. In addition, Jansen's general non-intervention policy with the old city center proved insufficient to maintain its character – in the absence of managed oversight, many old buildings ended up deteriorating, ultimately getting demolished, and then being replaced with new structures that architecturally did not blend in.

=== The Aru-Söylemezoğlu plan (1955) ===
By the 1950s, Gaziantep's rapid growth was outpacing the Jansen plan's limits, resulting in the creation of unplanned settlements (such as Karşıyaka in the north and Düztepe in the south) and prompting the creation of a new city plan. This plan, drawn up by Kemal Ahmet Aru and Hamit Kemali Söylemezoğlu in 1955, continued the basic principles of the Jansen plan while adding some revisions. The city's shape remained compact and focused around a single center, which was now being extended towards the south and west.

The main goal of the Aru-Söylemezoğlu plan was to provide new housing to meet the needs of the growing urban population. There was also an effort to shift from agriculturally-oriented economy to industrial.

Among the important features introduced in the Aru-Söylemezoğlu plan were the railway station, now in its current location, and the addition of the new İpek Yolu highway as a northwards continuation of İstasyon Cd. The new planned upscale residential neighborhoods of Bahçelievler, Kavaklık, and Öğretmenevleri signalled a shift towards building new neighborhoods to the southwest. Ordu Cd, a westward extension of Atatürk Cd, was opened up, and the Kilis-Aleppo axis shifted to this route. In general, the Aru-Söylemezoğlu plan planned a grid plan for the city's streets.

The area north of Alleben Creek, which under the Jansen plan had been designated as recreational areas, were converted into residential development under Aru-Söylemezoğlu plan. Several small new industrial areas were also developed around Nizip Cd, Araban Yolu, and İpek Yolu.

=== The Can plan (1973) ===
In 1973, a competition was organized under the supervision of İller Bank to draft a third city zoning plan for Gaziantep; it was held simultaneously with ones in Konya and Kayseri. The Gaziantep contest was won by a team led by Zühtü Can and also including Yalçın Alaybeyoğlu, Abdullah Dellaloğlu, Müzeyyen Can, and Haluk Aral. The resulting Can plan consisted of several stages guiding the city's development until a target year of 1995, when they projected a population of 1 million for Gaziantep.

The Can plan focused on developing Gaziantep as an industrial center, with an increasing share of land dedicated to industrial use. These industrial areas were also increasingly set apart from residential areas. The Can plan envisioned a three-pole city with industrial areas at the west and east ends and new residential development in the south. Gaziantep's Organized Industrial Zone had been established in 1969 and was one of the first in Turkey. By 1978, manufacturing had reached 11.6% of Gaziantep's GDP, compared to about 17% for the country as a whole.

The 1970s were Gaziantep's highest period of immigration. New residential development during this period was clustered into two main areas. The first area was neighborhoods on the south and east sides of town like Karşıyaka, Düztepe, and Çıksorut, where many manufacturing jobs were available. The second consisted of areas on the north and west where relatively higher-income people who worked in the service sector lived. The patterns for urban development differed between these two areas. In the south and east, there was an irregular settlement pattern formed by purchasing land around factories. In the north and west, there was a regular grid of wide streets lined with houses and apartment complexes.

Beginning in the mid-1980s, the Can plan was undermined by illegal building and zoning amnesties, which disrupted the plan's form and caused the city to grow in unplanned ways. The municipal government tried to address the situation by performing piecemeal interventions to rehabilitate these areas, but ultimately the effect was that poorly integrated pockets of the city were formed.

=== The Aldan plan (1990) ===
The problem of illegal construction in the late 80s, combined with the introduction of the Metropolitan Municipality Law and changes to national zoning regulations such as Zoning Law 3194 (both giving cities increased authority in urban planning as opposed to the central government), necessitated an updated city plan. This plan, the fourth one in Gaziantep's history, was drafted in 1990 by H. Oğuz Aldan. The Aldan plan had a target year of 2005, with a predicted population of about 1.8 million. It planned for the city to expand to 8010 ha, of which 26% would be residential, 22% would be industrial, and 17% would be open green spaces.

The Aldan plan followed a metropolitan, polycentric model, with new commercial zones mixed in with the residential areas to serve as secondary urban centers. The main directions for new development were toward the west and south. A new ring road on the east, south, and west helped boost growth in these directions. Some of the new secondary centers were built in the Karataş and İbrahimli areas. Another major addition was a new commercial area on the east side of the city called the Gaziantep Ticaret ve Endüstri Merkezi (Gaziantep Trade and Industry Center), or GATEM for short. Located on the Araban-Adıyaman highway, on the city's outskirts, the GATEM was to occupy 40 ha and also include an intercity bus terminal.

=== In the 21st century ===
Since the 2000s, a number of smaller-scale targeted projects have taken place, such as local rezoning of industrial areas in the Ünaldı neighborhood; reworking unplanned settlements that do not meet building standards; and various other development projects (for example in areas like Bağlarbaşı, Geneyik, Sarıgüllük, Halep Bulvarı, Kilis Yolu, and Orta Tepe).

=== Zoo ===
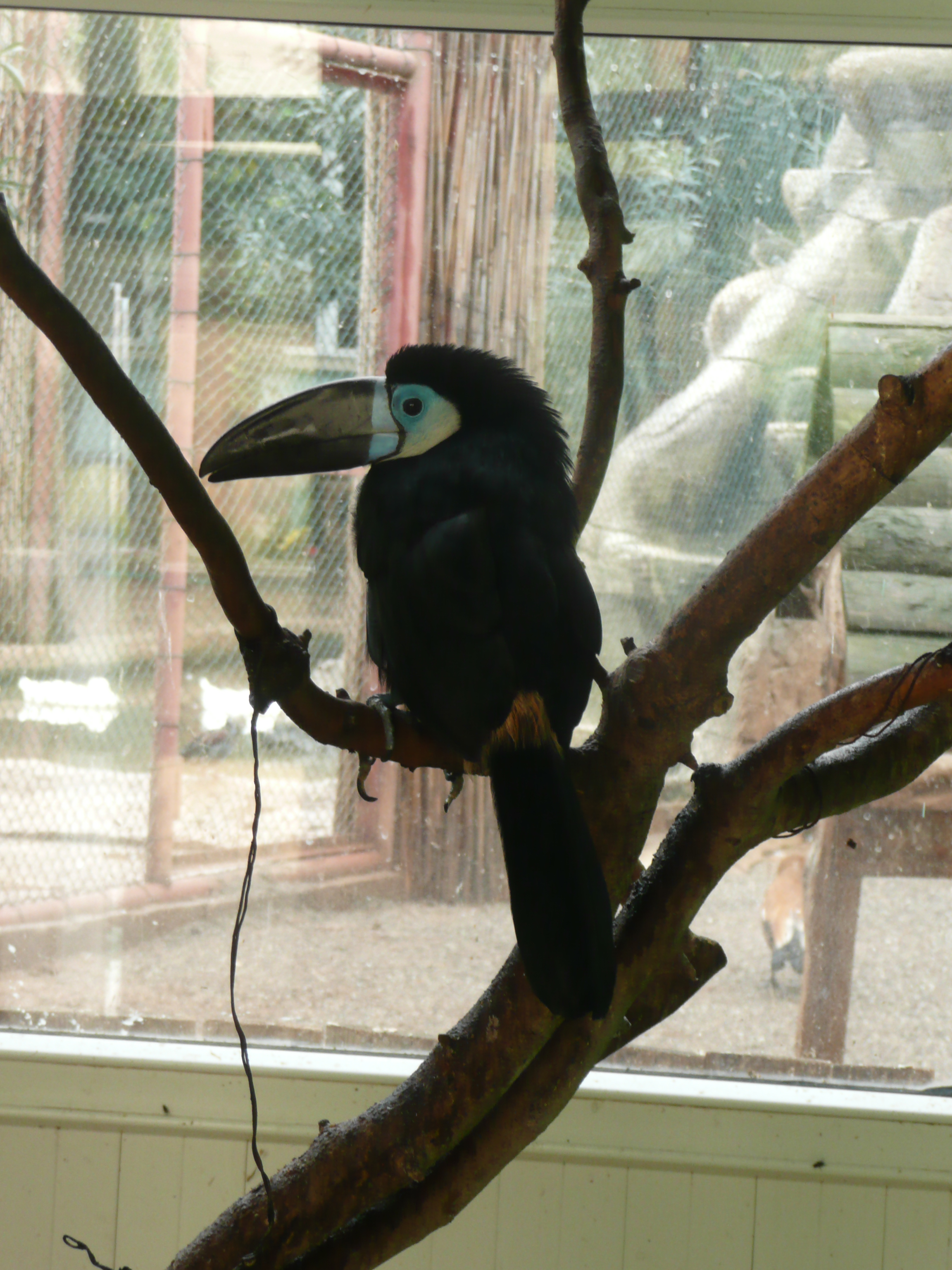
Ramphastos vitellinus at the Gaziantep Zoo

Gaziantep Zoo is one of the largest zoos in Turkey. Especially interesting are the bird pavilion and the aquarium. Gaziantep Zoo offers a large variety of animals, attractive picnic grounds, and a cafeteria. The facility is established on 1,000,000-square-metre (11,000,000 sq ft) field. There are 264 species and 6,814 animals.

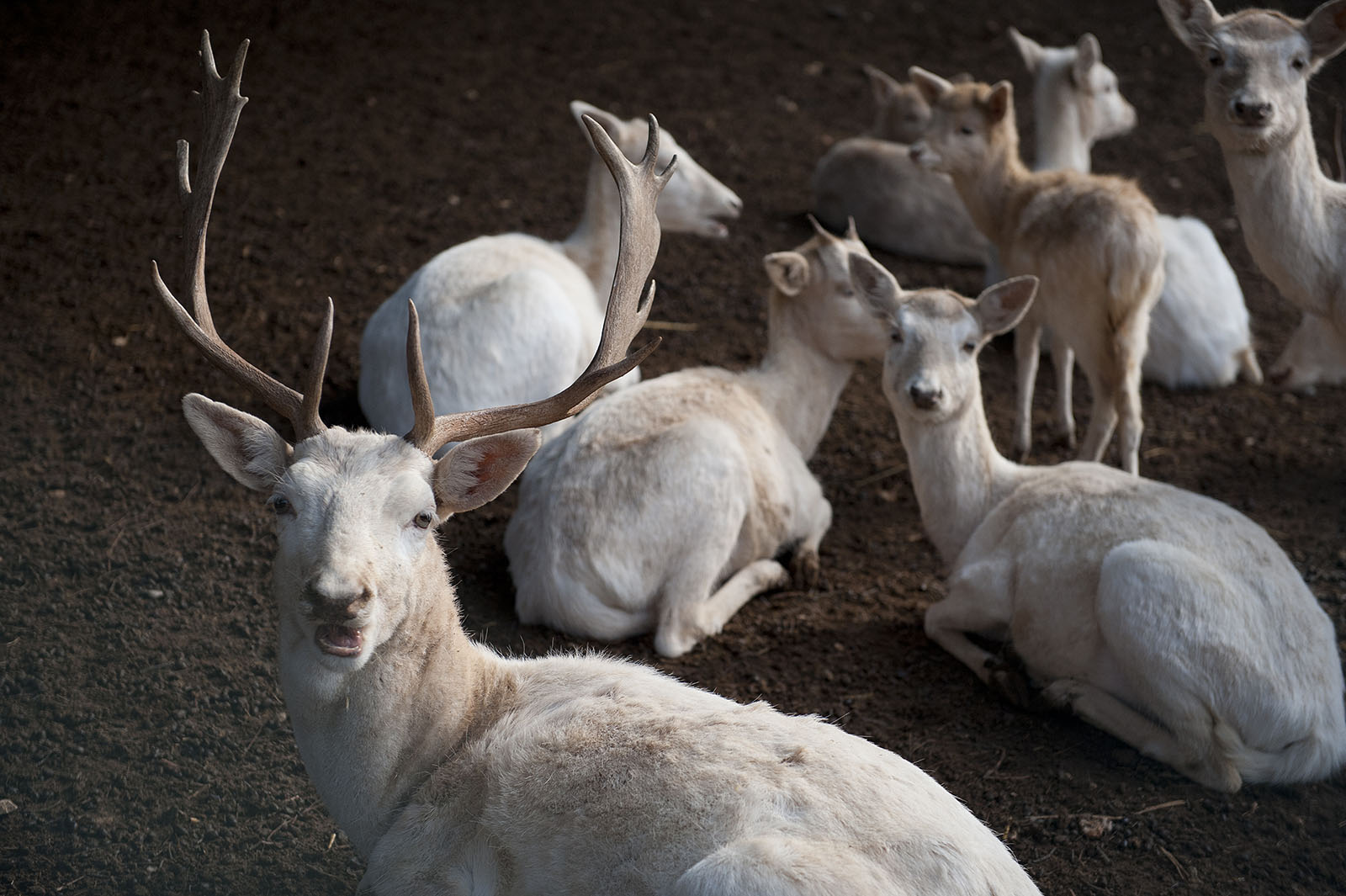
Gaziantep Zoo White deer

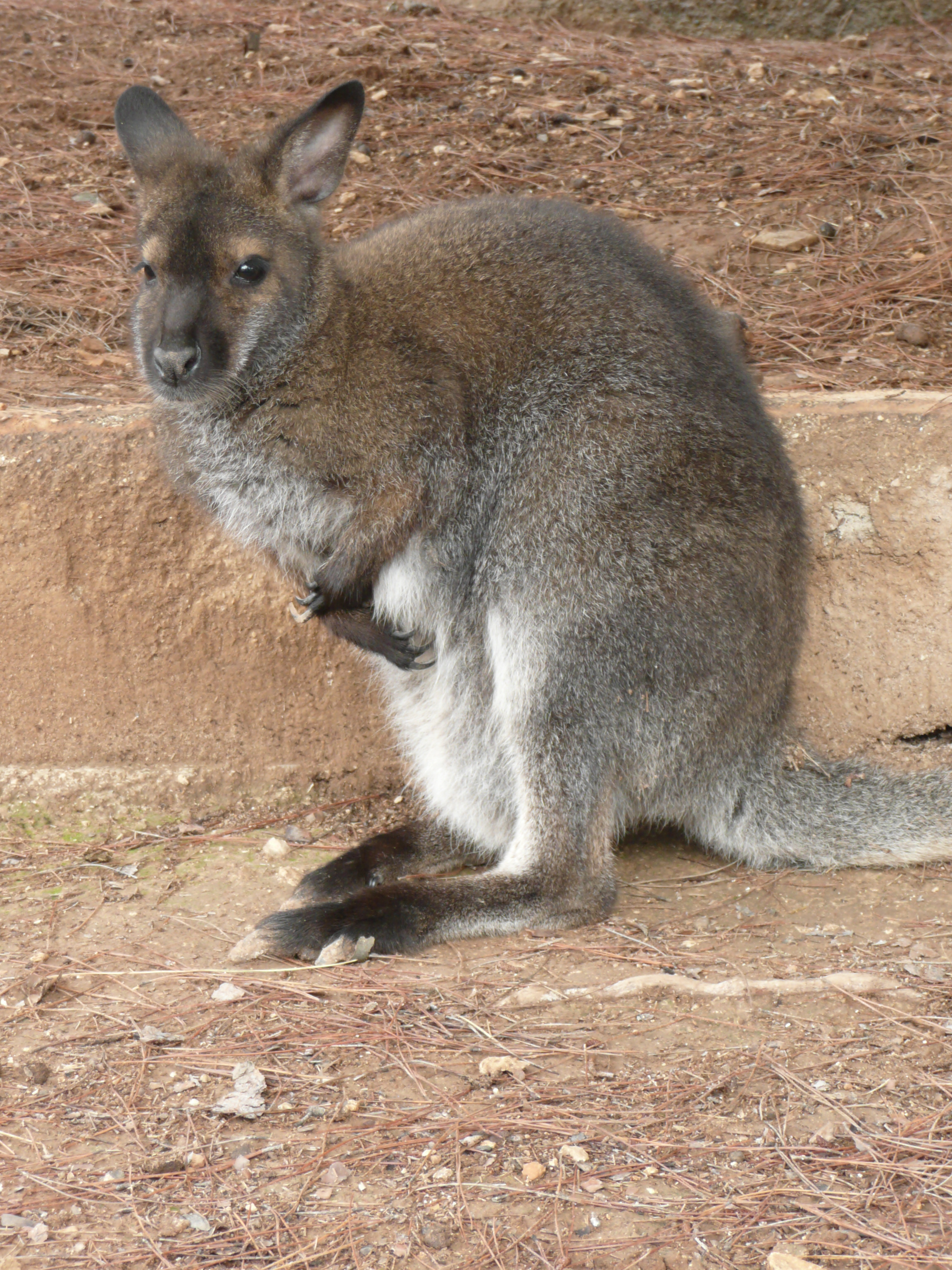
Red-necked wallaby

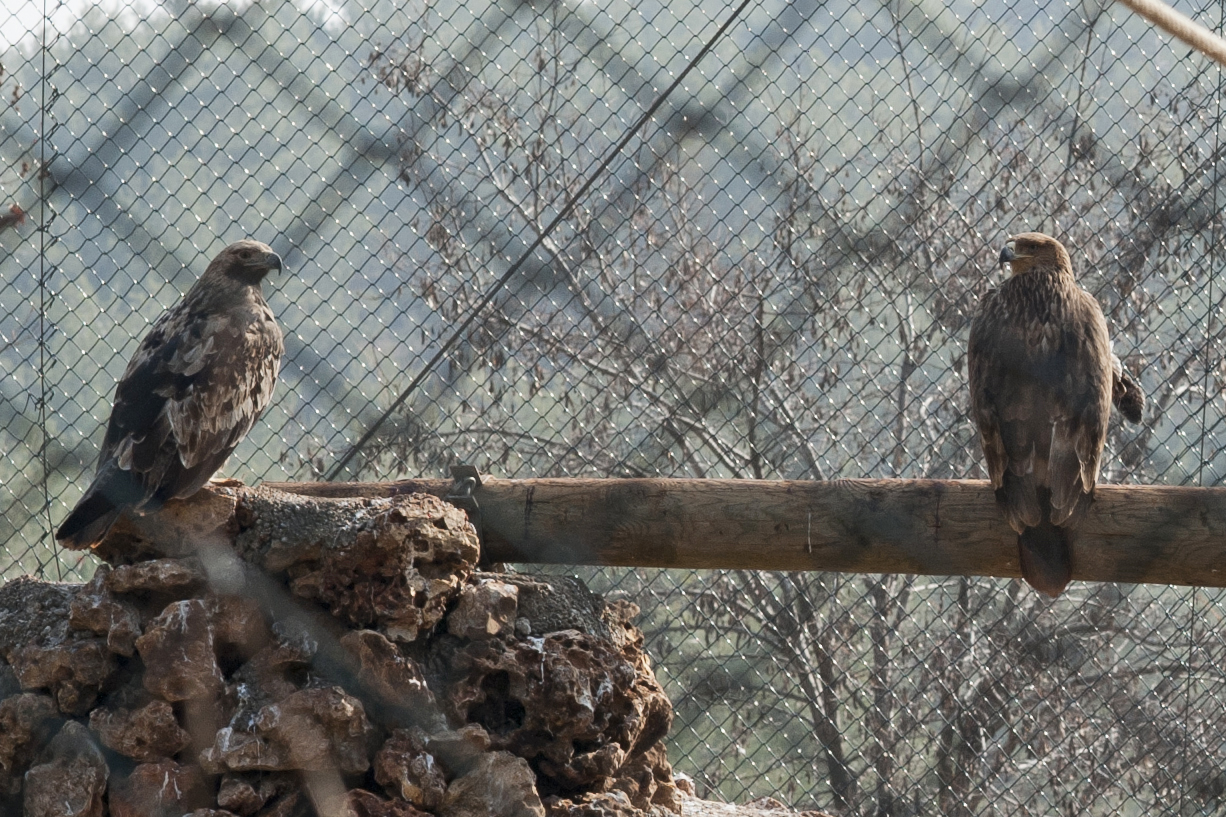
Gaziantep Zoo Eagles

== Twin towns – sister cities ==
Gaziantep is twinned with:

- Aleppo, Syria
- Aryanah, Tunisia
- Cetinje, Montenegro
- Duisburg, Germany
- Irbid, Jordan
- Karlstad, Sweden
- Kermanshah, Iran
- Kharkiv, Ukraine
- Kuwait City, Kuwait
- Ludwigshafen am Rhein, Germany
- North Nicosia, Northern Cyprus
- Ostrava, Czech Republic
- Sabaragamuwa, Sri Lanka
- Tripoli, Lebanon
- Celje, Slovenia
- Baghdad, Iraq
- Braga, Portugal
- Kenitra, Morocco
- Minsk, Belarus
- Maykop, Russia
- Kotor, Montenegro
- Ulaanbaatar, Mongolia
- Pittsburgh, United States
- Samarkand, Uzbekistan
- Tutin, Serbia

== Notable people ==
- See Category:People from Gaziantep

== See also ==
- Franco-Turkish War (Cilicia War)
- Rumkale
- Zeugma
