= Zeliha Kendir =

Turkish field hockey and indoor hockey player (born 2001)

Personal information
- Born: 4 October 2001 (age 24) Gaziantep, Turkey

Sport
- Sport: Field hockey
- Club: Gaziantep Doruk SK
National team
Years	Team	Caps	Goals
–	Turkey		-
Medal record
Representing Turkey
Women's Indoor hockey
EuroHockey Indoor Championship II
Gold medal – first place	2026 Lousada	Team
Women's Field hockey
EuroHockey Championship III
Silver medal – second place	2025 Alanya	Team
Gold medal – first place	2023 Zagreb	Team
EuroHockey U21 Championship III
Gold medal – first place	2022 Alanya	Team

Zeliha Kendir (born 4 October 2001) is a Turkish field and indoor hockey player. She is a member of Gaziantep Doruk SK and part of the Turkey national field and indoor hockey teams.

== Early years ==
Kendir started her hockey playing career at the age of twelve with the encouragement of her physical education teacher when she got to know indoor hockey she was curious about. In the beginning, her parents, who were against her choice of sport because of her sex, had to be persuaded by her teacher. After six months of training, she took part at a tournament, which her team took the first place. Her family supported her when she achieved success.

== Club career ==
She won the champions title at the 2021–22 Turkish Women's Indoor Hockey Super League with her team Gaziantep Doruk SK, and was named the Most valuable player (MVP). As part of Gaziantrp Doruk SK, she played at the 2023 Women's EuroHockey Club Challenge II in Vienna, Austria.

In November 2023, the Menteşe, Muğla-based club Ege Yıldızları SK transferred the striker of Gaziantep Doruk SK Kendir to strengthen the team.

Returned to her initial club Gaziantep Doruk SK, she took part at the 2026 Women's EuroHockey Indoor Club Trophy in Lambersart, France.

== International career ==
Kendir was admitted to the national team already at the age of fourteen.

=== Indoor hockey ===
With the Turkey women's U18 indoor hockey team, she played at the 2019 Women's EuroHockey Indoor Junior Championship in Tarnowskie Góry, Poland.

She played at the 2022 Women's EuroHockey Indoor Championship in Hamburg, Germany, and at the 2024 Women's EuroHockey Indoor Championship in Berlin, Germany.

She was part of the national indoor hockey team, which won the gold medal at the 2026 Women's EuroHockey Indoor Championship II in Lousada, Portugal. She was instrumental with her goals for Turkey's champions title and the promotion to the higher championship level next time.

=== Field hockey ===
As part of the Turkey women's U21 field hockey team, she won the gold medal at the 2022 Women's EuroHockey Junior Championship III in Alanya, Turkey, and was named the MVP.

She captured the gold medal with the national field hockey team at the 2023 Women's EuroHockey Championship III in Zagreb, Croatia.

She took the silver medal with the national field hockey team at the 2025 Women's EuroHockey Championship III in Alanya, Turkey.

== Personal life ==
Zeliha Kendir was born in Gaziantep, Turkey on 4 October 2001. She has six siblings.

After finishing the high school, she attended Sports Science Faculty of Gaziantep University in 2019, and studied Physical education and Sports to become a school teacher.

== Honours ==
=== Club ===
Turkish Women's Indoor Hockey Super League (KSHSL)

Gaziantep Doruk SK
Champions (1): 2021–22

=== International ===
Turkey U21 field hockey team
Champions (1): 2022 EuroHockey Junior III

Turkey field hockey team
Champions (1): 2023 Women's EuroHockey Championship III
Runners-up (1): 2025 Women's EuroHockey Championship III

Turkey indoor hockey team
Champions (1): 2026 EuroHockey Indoor Championship II

=== Individual ===
Most valuable player (2)

2021–22 KSHSL (Gaziantep Doruk SK)
2022 Women's EuroHockey Junior Championship III
