= Perihan Çınar =

Turkish field hockey and indoor hockey player

Personal information
- Born: Perihan Küçükkoç; 17 January 1994 (age 32) Nizip, Gaziantep, Turkey

Sport
- Sport: Field hockey
- Position: Forward
- Club: Gaziantep Polisgücü SK
National team
| Years | Team | Caps | Goals |
| – | Turkey | 20 | (22) |
Medal record
Representing Turkey
Women's Indoor hockey
EuroHockey Indoor Championship II
| Silver medal – second place | 2020 Sveti Ivan Zelina | Team |
Women's Field hockey
EuroHockey Championship III
| Gold medal – first place | 2023 Zagreb | Team |
| Gold medal – first place | 2017 Sveti Ivan Zelina | Team |
| Bronze medal – third place | 2015 Sveti Ivan Zelina | Team |

Perihan Çınar (née Küçükkoç, born 17 January 1994) is a Turkish hockey player who plays field hockey, hockey5s, and indoor hockey. She is part of the Gaziantep Polisgücü SK and the Turkey women's national teams, and has received several most-valuable player (MVP) and top-goalscorer awards.

== Early and personal life ==
Perihan Küçükkoç was born in Nizip district of Gaziantep Province, southeastern Turkey, on 17 January 1994. She attended Nizip Abdurrahman Alkan Primary School and Adile Altınbaş Middle School. After completing her secondary education at Yahya Altınbaş High School, she studied Physical Education at Gazi University in Ankara. After graduating, she worked as a physical education teacher at Osman Nuri Bakırcı Middle School in Esenyurt, Istanbul, and later taught at Gaziantep Nizip Yunus Emre Middle School.

After her marriage, Küçükkoç took the surname Çınar. She has a son named Alptuğ Ümeyr.

== Club career ==
Perihan Çınar started playing hockey at the age of ten. She received her licence in 2005 and has been playing hockey since then. Çınar was a member of Abant İzzet Baysal University SK, and she also plays in her hometown for Gaziantep Polisgücü SK. As of January 2024, she has played in 97 league matches and scored 169 goals.

=== Field hockey ===
Çınar played at the 2018 Women's EuroHockey Club Challenge III, at which her team Gaziantep Polisgücü finished as champions. They also won the 2018–19 THF Women's Field Hockey Super League season, and Çınar was named the league's top goalscorer. By 2022, the team had won the Turkish Hockey Federation (THF) Women's Field Hockey Super League, and Çınar was again their top goalscorer, scoring 58 times. She was part of the Gaziantep Polisgücü team the following season, at which the team were runners-up after the play-offs. Playing with Gaziantep Polisgücü, who finished the 2019–20 THF Indoor Super League as champions, she was named the most-valuable player (MVP).

=== Indoor hockey ===
Çınar was also a member of the Abant İzzet Baysal University SK women's hockey team and played in the 2013 Eurohockey Women's Indoor Club Challenge in Lisbon, Portugal. She was named the MVP of the tournament when the team won the cup.

Çınar also played for the Ankara side Keçiören Bağlum S.K., which won the 2013–2014 THF Women's Indoor Hockey Super League season. She was named the MVP and top goalscorer of the season. The team was runner-up at the 2023–24 THF Women's Indoor Hockey League after losing to Ege Yıldızları SK in the final.

== International career ==
Perihan Çınar is part of Turkey's women's national field hockey team and the women's national indoor hockey team, serving as team captain. She was selected for the national team in 2007 and since then has been capped over 100 times, scoring 22 goals in 20 matches for the A team.

=== Indoor hockey ===
Çınar was part of the national team at the 2020 Women's EuroHockey Indoor Championship II in Sveti Ivan Zelina, Croatia. Turkey finished the tournament as runners-up, and Çınar was named the MVP with teammate Sinem Alpakan. Çınar took part in the 2022 Women's EuroHockey Indoor Championship, which was held in Hamburg, Germany, where the Turkish team finished in sixth place.

In she was appointed captain of the national team at the 2024 Women's EuroHockey Indoor Championship, which was held in February in Berlin, Germany.

=== Hockey5s ===
In June 2023, Çınar played at the Women's EuroHockey5s Championship in Wałcz, Poland, in which Turkey was ranked fifth among the ten participating nations. Çınar was again named the top goalscorer, having scored 22 goals that season.

=== Field hockey ===
Çınar played in Round Two of the 2014–2015 Women's FIH Hockey World League in Dublin, Ireland; and at Round One of the same tournament in 2016–2017 in Prague, Czech Republic. Round Two was held in Valencia, Spain. At the 2015 Women's EuroHockey Championship III in Sveti Ivan Zelina, Croatia, she played in the national team, which won bronze; she was also part of the national team at the 2017 Women's EuroHockey tournament in Sveti Ivan Zelina, where the Turkish team won the championship and Çınar was named the MVP of the competition.

Çınar played at the 2018–19 Women's Hockey Series Open in Vilnius, Lithuania, and at the 2019 Women's EuroHockey Championship II in Glasgow, Scotland. In July 2023, she played field hockey at the Women's EuroHockey Championship III in Zagreb, Croatia; the Turkish team defeated Switzerland in the final and became the champion among the four nations.

== Honours ==
=== Clubs ===
THF Women's Field Hockey Championship (with Gaziantep Polisgücü SK)

- Champions (2): 2018–19 2021–22
- Runners-up (1): 2022–23

Women's EuroHockey Club Challenge III

- Champions (1): 2018 (with Gaziantep Polisgücü SK)

THF Women's Indoor Hockey League

- Champions (2): 2013–14 (with Keçiören Bağlum S.K.), 2019–20 (with Gaziantep Polisgücü SK)
- Runners-up (1): 2023–24 (with Gaziantep Polisgücü SK)

=== International ===
Women's EuroHockey Indoor Championship II (Turkey women's indoor hockey)

- Runners-up (1): 2020

Women's EuroHockey Championship III (Turkey women's field hockey)

- Champions (2): 2017, 2023
- Third places (1): 2015

=== Individual ===
Most Valuable Player (3)

- 2013 Eurohockey Women's Indoor Club Challenge
- 2013–14 THF Women's Indoor Hockey Super League
- 2017 Women's EuroHockey Championship III
- 2019–20 THF Women's Indoor Super League
- 2020 Women's EuroHockey Indoor Championship II

Top Goalscorer (3)

- 2013–14 THF Women's Indoor Hockey Super League
- 2018–19 THF Women's Field Hockey Super League
- 2022 THF Women's Field Hockey Championship (58 goals)
- 2023 Women's EuroHockey5s Championship (22 goals)
