= Gülcan Paksoy =

Turkish field hockey and indoor hockey player (born 2004)

Gülcam Paksoy
Personal information
- Born: 15 January 2004 (age 22) Turkey

Sport
- Sport: Field hockey
- Club: Alanya Stars HSK
National team
Years	Team	Caps	Goals
–	Turkey		-
Medal record
Representing Turkey
Women's Indoor hockey
EuroHockey Indoor Championship II
Gold medal – first place	2026 Lousada	Team
Women's Field hockey
EuroHockey Championship III
Silver medal – second place	2025 Alanya	Team
Gold medal – first place	2023 Zagreb	Team
Bronze medal – third place	2021 Lipovci	Team

Gülcan Paksoy (born 15 January 2004) is a Turkish professional field and indoor hockey player. She is a member of Alanya Stars HSK and part of the Turkey national field and indoor hockey teams.

== Club career ==
Paksoy played at the 2019–20 Turkish Girls' U16 Indoor Hockey Championship, and became the Top Goalscorer.

For the 2023–24 league season, she left her club Alanya Stars HSK and transferred to the Menteşe, Muğla-based club Ege Yıldızları SK to strengthen the team. That season, her team became Indoor Hockey Super League champion, at which she was instrumental. With her team, she played at the 2025 Women's EuroHockey Indoor Club Cup in Šiauliai, Lithuania.

In September 2025, it was announced that she signed a contract with the Feld Bundesliga I-club HC Ludwigburg in Germany.

For the 2025–26 Super League season, she returned home, and rejoined her initial club Alanya Stars HSK.

== International career ==
=== Indoor hockey ===
With the national U21 indoor hockey team, she played at the 2025 EuroHockey Indoor U21 Championship Women in Wałcz, Poland.

She was part of the national indoor hockey team, which won the gold medal at the 2026 Women's EuroHockey Indoor Championship II in Lousada, Portugal. She was instrumental with her goals for Turkey's champions title and the promotion to the higher championship level next time.

=== Field hockey ===
As part of the national U16 field hockey team, Paksoy played at the 2019 Girls' EuroHockey5s Championship in Wałcz, Poşand.

A member of the national U18 field hockey team, she played at the 2021 Girls' U18 EuroHockey Championship III in Zagreb, Croatia.

With the national field hockey team, she played at the Women's EuroHockey Championship III, and took the bronze medal in 2021 in Lipovci, Slovenia, the gold medal in 2023 in Zagreb, Cratia, and the silver medal in 2025 in Alanya, Turkey.

== Personal life ==
Gülcan Paksoy was born on 15 January 2004.

She attended Sports Science Faculty of Faziantep University.

== Honours ==
=== Club ===
Turkish Women's Indoor Hocley Super League

Ege Yıldızları SK
Champions (1): 2023–24

=== International ===
Turkey indoor hockey team
Champions (1): 2026 EuroHockey Indoor Championship II

Turkey field hockey team
Champions (1): 2023 Women's EuroHockey Championship III
Runners-up (1): 2025 Women's EuroHockey Championship III
Third place (1): 2021 Women's EuroHockey Championship III

=== Individual ===
Top Goalscorer (1)

2019–20 Turkish Girls' U16 Indoor Hockey Championship
