= 2022 Women's EuroHockey Indoor Championship II =

Tournament details
- Host country: Spain
- City: Ourense
- Dates: 21–23 January
- Teams: 6 (from 1 confederation)
- Venue: Pazo dos Deportes Paco Paz

Final positions
- Champions: Spain (2nd title)
- Runner-up: Belgium
- Third place: Poland

Tournament statistics
- Matches played: 15
- Goals scored: 95 (6.33 per match)
- Top scorer: (Belgium) Joanne Peeters (10 goals)
- Best player: (Spain) Berta Agulló
- Best young player: (Switzerland) Sofie Stomps
- Best goalkeeper: (Spain) Paula Ruiz

The 2022 Women's EuroHockey Indoor Championship II was the fourteenth edition of the Women's EuroHockey Indoor Championship II, the second level of the women's European indoor hockey championships organized by the European Hockey Federation. It took place from 21 to 23 January 2022 at the Pazo dos Deportes Paco Paz in Ourense, Spain.

Spain won their second Women's EuroHockey Indoor Championship II title by finishing top of the round-robin pool. It was promoted to the Women's EuroHockey Indoor Championship in 2024 together with Belgium, Poland and Switzerland.

== Qualified teams ==
Participating nations have qualified based on their final ranking from the 2020 competition.

Dates	Event	Location	Quotas	Qualifiers
24–26 January 2020	2020 EuroHockey Indoor Championship	Minsk, Belarus	2	Belgium; Switzerland
24–26 January 2020	2020 EuroHockey Indoor Championship II	Sveti Ivan Zelina, Croatia	2	~~Croatia~~; ~~Lithuania~~; Poland; Scotland
24–26 January 2020	2020 EuroHockey Indoor Championship III	Bratislava, Slovakia	2	Ireland; Spain
Total			6	

== Results ==
=== Standings ===
Pos	Team	Pld	W	D	L	GF	GA	GD	Pts	Promotion
1	Spain (H, P)	5	4	0	1	24	12	+12	12	EuroHockey Indoor Championship
2	Belgium (P)	5	3	2	0	26	12	+14	11	EuroHockey Indoor Championship
3	Poland (P)	5	3	1	1	17	9	+8	10	EuroHockey Indoor Championship
4	Switzerland (P)	5	1	2	2	12	18	−6	5	EuroHockey Indoor Championship
5	Scotland	5	1	1	3	10	19	−9	4	
6	Ireland	5	0	0	5	6	25	−19	0	

Source: FIH
Rules for classification: 1) points; 2) matches won; 3) goal difference; 4) goals for; 5) head-to-head result; 6) field goals scored.
(H) Hosts; (P) Promoted

=== Fixtures ===
21 January 2022
10:00

Switzerland	0–5	Spain
	Report	R. Ybarra 5', 31'; Monsalve 13'; Altuna 30', 32'

Umpires:
Katie Howie (SCO)
Una Mihajlović (CRO)

21 January 2022
11:15

Belgium	5–1	Scotland
Peeters 20'; Vouche 30+'; Mommens 34'; Gose-Claessens 37'; Truyens 40+'	Report	McEwan 8'

Umpires:
Ana Ortega (ESP)
Gemma Jones (ENG)

21 January 2022
12:30

Poland	4–1	Ireland
Katerla 26'; Slawinska 36', 37'; Tatarczuk 39'	Report	Kelly 19'

Umpires:
Caroline Ellice (SCO)
Cristina Pérez (ESP)

21 January 2022
16:15

Switzerland	3–3	Scotland
Stomps 5', 40'; Zepf 8'	Report	Dark 6'; Steiger 15'; Blaikie 23'

Umpires:
Tanja Schafer (RSA)
Cristina Pérez (ESP)

21 January 2022
17:30

Ireland	1–9	Belgium
Patton 10'	Report	Peeters 7', 32', 33' van der Gracht 9'; Ronquetti 16', 22'; Vouche 37'; Mommens 39'

Umpires:
Una Mihajlović (CRO)
Ana Ortega (ESP)

21 January 2022
18:45

Poland	3–4	Spain
Skoraszewska 27'; Slawinska 29'; Polewczak 36'	Report	Altuna 12'; Monsalve 24', 37'; Agulló 28'

Umpires:
Gemma Jones (ENG)
Magali Sergeant (BEL)

22 January 2022
10:00

Ireland	2–5	Switzerland
Patton 8'; Lloyd 35'	Report	Stomps 16', 22', 34'; Pöhler 25'; Heselhaus 39'

Umpires:
Magali Sergeant (BEL)
Ana Ortega (ESP)

22 January 2022
11:15

Scotland	2–6	Spain
Dark 27', 36'	Report	R. Ybarra 3', 9', 28'; Agulló 30', 40'; Monsalve 33'

Umpires:
Una Mihajlović (CRO)
Gemma Jones (ENG)

22 January 2022
12:30

Belgium	2–2	Poland
van der Gracht 21'; Ronquetti 40'	Report	Slawinska 23'; Katerla 32'

Umpires:
Tanja Schafer (RSA)
Caroline Ellice (SCO)

22 January 2022
16:15

Scotland	3–2	Ireland
Dark 7'; Hinds 13'; Semple 18'	Report	Macken 12', 14'

Umpires:
Cristina Pérez (ESP)
Magali Sergeant (BEL)

22 January 2022
17:30

Switzerland	1–5	Poland
Stomps 33'	Report	Katerla 25', 39'; Tatarczuk 30'; Polewczak 35'; Kucharska 40'

Umpires:
Ana Ortega (ESP)
Tanja Schafer (RSA)

22 January 2022
19:00

Spain	5–7	Belgium
Civera 4'; Bruguera 5'; R. Ybarra 22', 30', 39'	Report	Peeters 9', 13', 33', 33', 40'; Gose-Claessens 35', 38'

Umpires:
Gemma Jones (ENG)
Caroline Ellice (SCO)

23 January 2022
10:00

Belgium	3–3	Switzerland
Ronquetti 6'; Peeters 22'; Gose-Claessens 40'	Report	Pöhler 17'; Heselhaus 38', 39'

Umpires:
Gemma Jones (ENG)
Critsina Pérez (ESP)

23 January 2022
11:30

Poland	3–1	Scotland
Polewczak 13'; Katerla 26'; Plewa 33'	Report	Martin 17'

Umpires:
Tanja Schafer (RSA)
Magali Sergeant (BEL)

23 January 2022
13:00

Spain	4–0	Ireland
R. Ybarra 19'; Altuna 20'; Civera 25'; Bruguera 27'	Report

Umpires:
Caroline Ellice (SCO)
Una Mihajlović (CRO)

== See also ==
- 2022 Men's EuroHockey Indoor Championship II
- 2022 Women's EuroHockey Indoor Championship
