= Leyla Öztürk =

Turkish field hockey and indoor hockey player (born 1991)

Personal information
- Born: 19 August 1991 (age 34)

Sport
- Sport: Field hockey
- Club: Bolu GSİM
National team
Years	Team	Caps	Goals
–	Turkey		-
Medal record
Representing Turkey
Women's Field hockey
Women's EuroHockey Championship III
Bronze medal – third place	2015 Sveti Ivan Zelina	Team
Women's EuroHockey Junior Championship III
Silver medal – second place	2012 Lisbon	Team

Leyla Öztürk (born 19 August 1991) is a Turkish former field and indoor hockey player. She is a member of Bolu GSİM and part of the Turkey national field and indoor hockey teams.

== Club career ==
Öztürk started her hockey playing career with the encouragement of her teacher of physical education in the secondary school in 2005.

Öztürk, captain of the Gaziantep Polisgücü, became Top goalscorer with 35 goals, and enjoyed her team's champions title in the 2018–19 Indoor Hockey Super League season.

In March 2019, she led the boys' team to the champiions title and the girls' team to the third please of the secondary school, she was teacher in, at the Turkish Intra School Hockey Provincial Tournament. In April the same year, she officiated a field hockey game of the junior girls in the final match of two high schools in Zonguldak.

In the 2021–22 Indoor Hockey First League season, she played for Bolu GSİM.

She was with Cavidil, also known as Pamukkale Bld., in the 2022–23 Indoor Hockey First League season as a player and an assistant coach.

In the 2025–26 season, she was again with Bolu GSİM in the Indoor Hockey First League. Her team finished the season in the third place.

== Coaching career ==
Öztürk started a career as an assistant coach in 2022 serving one season for Cavidil in Pamukkale, Denizli in the Women's Indoor Hokey First League.

== International career ==
Öztürk was invited to the national U18 teaml in 2007.

She played as captain of the national women's U21 field hockey team at the 2012 Women's EuroHockey Junior Championship III in Lisbon, Portugal, and won the silver medal.

Later, she became a member of the national field hockey team. She played at the 2012–13 Women's FIH Hockey World League Round 1 in Prague, Czech Republic, the 2015 Women's EuroHockey Championship III in Sveti Ivan Zelina, Croatia, and the 2019 Women's EuroHockey Championship II in Glasgow, Scotland. She also captained the national field hockey team.

== Personal life ==
Leyla Öztürk was born on 19 August 1991.

In 2013, she was appointed as a teacher of Physical Education in a secondary school in Çaycuma, Zonguldak. From 2021 on, she has been serving as a school teacher of Physical Education in Zonguldak.

== Honours ==
=== Club ===
Turkish Women's Indoor Hockey Super League

Gaziantep Polisgücü
(gold) (1): 2018–19

Turkish Women's Indoor Hockey First League

Bolu Bld.
(bronze) (1): 2025–26

=== International ===
Turkey women's U21 field hockey team
(silver) (1): 2012 Women's EuroHockey Junior Championship III

Turkey women's field hockey teaö
(bronze) (1): 2015 Women's EuroHockey Championship III

=== Individual ===
Top Goalscorer (1)
2018–19 Indoor Hockey Super League (Gaziantep Polisgücü)
