= Şahiner =

Şahiner is a Turkish word, and it may refer to:

- Çetin Şahiner (1934–2017), Turkish hurdler
- Ece Şahiner (born 2000), Turkish female hockey player
- Ömer Ali Şahiner (born 1992), Turkish footballer
