= Education in Urfa =

There are a number of major educational facilities in Urfa, Turkey.

== Harran University ==
Harran University was established in Urfa in 1992 as an amalgamation of several different faculties that had previously been attached to two different universities. The first of these was the Vocational School, which had been established in 1976 as a subordinate of Dicle University in Diyarbakır and was the first institute of higher learning in Urfa. Also attached to Dicle University were the Faculty of Agriculture (established in 1978) and the Faculty of Engineering (established in 1984). Gaziantep University had also established a Faculty of Theology in Urfa in 1988. With the foundation of Harran University, these departments were all brought together under a single organization. Several new faculties were also created at the same time: the Faculty of Arts and Sciences, the Faculty of Medicine, the Institute of Social Sciences, and the Institute of Science and Health Sciences.

Since 1992, a number of additional departments have been added to the university. It now comprises 14 faculties, 4 "schools" (Turkish: Yüksekokul), 3 institutes, and 13 vocational schools. The Şanlıurfa Vocational School was split in two in 2011, one focusing on technical sciences and the other focusing on social sciences. The other vocational schools under the university's rectorate are all located in other towns, as are the Siverek Faculty of Applied Sciences and the Viranşehir School of Health. Also under the university's banner is the State Conservatory, which was established in 2011.

== Former vocational schools ==
=== Mekteb-i Sanayi ===
By 1906, the presence of a vocational school in Urfa called the Mekteb-i Sanayi is attested. It was used as a hospital for wounded fighters during the Turkish War of Independence. This school stayed open after the war and is attested again in 1927, by then under the name of Urfa Male Industry School (Urfa Erkek Sanayi Mektebi). This school's building was demolished in the late 1930s and the Halkevi building was built on its site.

=== Urfa Girls' Institute ===
The Urfa Girls' Institute (Turkish: Urfa Kız Enstıtüsü), which opened in 1942, was an early vocational school teaching practical trades and general subjects to girls and young women. Its students were girls from ages 12 to 17 who had graduated primary school (up to 19 for specialized classes). The curriculum covered five years and was divided into two levels: the first three grades were secondary-level, general-knowledge courses for primary school graduates; while the last two were post-secondary-level and specifically for technical education. The general education classes included subjects such as science, mathematics, history, geography, Turkish, French, bookkeeping, physical education, and music. Once the student completed these three years, she was considered a secondary school graduate and could proceed to the two years of post-secondary education. This was also open to students who had completed secondary school elsewhere. The main specialized branches were sewing and fashion; individual classes also included artificial flowers, embroidery, childcare and health information, cooking, and housekeeping.

At the end of every academic year, there was an exhibition featuring the students' work, including sewing, embroidery, dresses and other clothes, hats, artificial flowers, and painting. Journalist Ekrem Erden wrote about one exhibition in 1954 which was visited by 1500 people a day and featured dresses, hats, coats, men's and women's shirts, blouses, nightgowns, and pajamas. During the school year the school also put on fashion shows also featuring students' creations. The schools would also accept orders from customers as part of their practical lesson plans, and then give students a share of the profits; this was to help accustom them to business life and also to provide them with some money as well. The teachers were mostly female; there were only a handful of male teachers.

The Girls' Institute also had an evening school, which was open to women up to the age of 45, regardless of educational background; they attended classes once or twice per week, with 6 hours of classes per week in total. Students between the ages of 17 and 25 formed the single largest student demographic at the evening school, but younger and older students were also not uncommon.

When the Girls' Institute first opened in 1942, there was no separate building for it; the lessons were held at the İnönü Primary School in the meantime. The school's first academic year was 1942–43 and there were 12 students (8 secondary and 4 post-secondary) along with 26 evening school students. According to Necla Alpan, one of the school's early students, this low number was because of the societal prejudice against sending girls to school. The journalist and author Ahmet Naci İpek, who was a primary school student at the time, later recalled that many of the fathers were forbidding and did not want their daughters to attend school, saying things like "What will happen if a girl reads?" On the other hand, he also recalled that many of the mothers, who had been confined to domestic life, were enthusiastic about the school's opening and hoped their daughters could gain knowledge and independence, and pushed back against their husbands' reluctance. A local newspaper article from February 1947 wrote that teachers were disappointed by the low number of students: from Urfa's population of about 40,000 at the time, the paper estimated that one could expect some 300–400 students at the Girls' Institute, but just 67 girls actually attended the school for the 1946–47 academic year. The paper attributed this to people not wanting to send their daughters to school.

The Girls' Institute program continued until the 1974–75 academic year, when they were reworked into the Girls' Vocational High School (Turkish: Kız Meslek Lisesi). The archive of the Urfa Girls' Institute is now in the archive of the Bahçelievler Vocational and Technical Anatolian School (Bahçelievler Mesleki ve Teknik Anadolu Lisesi).

=== Urfa Institute of Art for Boys ===
The boys' equivalent to the Girls' Institute was Urfa Institute of Art for Boys (Turkish: Urfa Erkek Sanat Enstıtüsü), which provided vocational education to boys aged 12 to 17. The objective was to teach them the skills needed to become skilled workers and artisans.

The institute had three main branches: woodworking, blacksmithing, and leveling. Other subjects were also taught at the school, including Turkish, citizenship, history, geography, mathematics, physics, "general technology", chemistry, "collective courses", physical education, health science, decorative painting, and "applied mechanics and tools". Like other Institutes in Turkey, education at the Urfa Institute of Art for Boys was divided into two phases: the Male Middle Art School, covering the first three years and the Male Art Institute, covering the last two years. After completing the first three years, students had to pass an exam in order to receive a diploma as a graduate of the Male Middle Art School. If they wished to continue their education and training, they could then move on to the Male Art Institute. Again, after completing this period there was an exam that students had to pass in order to receive a diploma as a graduate of the Urfa Male Art Institute.

The institute's students also took part in performing arts like music and theatre, and gave performances in front of audiences. These were done for various reasons, including social activities among students, as well as helping students who were struggling financially.

In the 1940s, there was a general opening of Art Schools for Boys in Turkey. The Urfa Institute of Art for Boys opened on 30 October 1944, as the Urfa Male Middle Art School (Turkish: Urfa Erkek Orta Sanat Okulu), during a general wave of opening vocational schools for boys in Turkey in the 1940s. The school's opening was presided over by Urfa governor Feyyaz Bosut. For the 1947–48 academic year, the school was expanded into the Male Art Institute with the addition of "circuit classes".

Urfa was severely lacking in educational institutions during this period, and the opening of the institute helped fill that need. At the time of its opening in 1944, there was only one other secondary school in the city. However, Turkey was under the wartime economy of World War II at the time, and lingering economic effects continued even after the war's end in 1945. The school's expansion into the Male Art Institute in 1947 was hindered by a lack of funds. In 1954, newspaper columnist Ekrem Erden wrote that the school was still unable to expand and was having tool shortages. As late as 1958, the school's carpentry workshop was still unfinished, forcing students to work in the halls.

Today, the school's archive is part of the Urfa Vocational and Technical Anatolian High School (Urfa Mesleki ve Teknik Anadolu Lisesi)'s archive.

== See also ==
- Education in Turkey
