= 2026 Women's EuroHockey Indoor Championship II =

Hockey competition

Tournament details
- Host country: Portugal
- City: Lousada
- Dates: 16–18 January
- Teams: 7 (from 1 confederation)

Final positions
- Champions: Turkey (1st title)
- Runner-up: Italy
- Third place: Sweden

Tournament statistics
- Matches played: 21
- Goals scored: 220 (10.48 per match)
- Top scorer: (Turkey) Fatma Songül Gültekin (25 goals)

The 2026 Women's EuroHockey Indoor Championship II was the sixteenth edition of the Women's EuroHockey Indoor Championship II, the second level of the women's European indoor hockey championships organized by the European Hockey Federation. It took place from 16 to 18 January 2026 in Lousada, Portugal.

== Results ==
=== Standings ===
Pos	Team	Pld	W	D	L	GF	GA	GD	Pts	Promotion
1	Turkey (P)	6	5	1	0	67	17	+50	16	EuroHockey Indoor Championship
2	Italy (P)	6	5	1	0	46	10	+36	16	EuroHockey Indoor Championship
3	Sweden	6	3	1	2	31	9	+22	10	
4	Croatia	6	2	2	2	34	22	+12	8	
5	Slovakia	6	2	1	3	29	36	−7	7	
6	Portugal (H)	6	1	0	5	9	37	−28	3	
7	Finland	6	0	0	6	4	89	−85	0	

Source: FIH
Rules for classification: 1) points; 2) matches won; 3) goal difference; 4) goals for; 5) head-to-head result; 6) field goals for.
(H) Hosts; (P) Promoted

=== Fixtures ===
16 January 2026
13:00

Turkey	5–4	Slovakia
Kendir 6', 23'; Şahiner 10'; Gültekin 30'; Okumuş 39'	Report	Medvikova 20'; Kramplova 24'; Vyskočová 36', 40'

Umpires:
Christian Phillips-Adams (WAL)
Arlette Bloks (NED)

16 January 2026
14:15

Sweden	2–2	Croatia
Moberg 4', 27'	Report	Čepo 2'; Nizek 23'

Umpires:
Ilaria Amorosini (ITA)
Alexandra Pollex (GER)

16 January 2026
15:30

Finland	0–19	Italy
	Report	Brea 4', 9', 20', 25', 28', 31', 37'; Torbol 6', 6', 10'; Di Paola 11', 12', 16'; Puglisi 14', 38'; Perani 18', 18'; Dalla Vittoria 29'; Di Bella 33'

Umpires:
Sophie Parker (ENG)
Christian Phillips-Adams (WAL)

16 January 2026
17:00

Portugal	1–3	Slovakia
Cardoso 20'	Report	Medvikova 12', 21'; Čapová 38'

Umpires:
Ellie Duffy (IRL)
Serap Yürükoğlu (TUR)

16 January 2026
19:00

Sweden	4–14	Turkey
von Blanquet 19', 29', 34'; Thien 27'	Report	Gültekin 2', 4', 14', 16', 18', 36'; Kendir 2', 3', 4', 17', 34', 37'; Paksoy 7'; Okumuş 22'

Umpires:
Maarten Boxma (NED)
Sophie Parker (ENG)

16 January 2026
20:15

Finland	1–13	Croatia
Valmu 20'	Report	Hrupec 2', 27', 31'; Čepo 8', 17', 22', 30', 40'; Čolić 11', 20', 34'; Bedenko 25'; Nizek 37'

Umpires:
Arlette Bloks (NED)
Ellie Duffy (IRL)

16 January 2026
21:30

Portugal	1–6	Italy
Nunes 20'	Report	Brea 10', 37'; Di Bella 27', 35'; Puglisi 36'; Di Paola 39'

Umpires:
Maarten Boxma (NED)
Thalia Bellemans (BEL)

17 January 2026
13:00

Croatia	4–4	Slovakia
Hrupec 2', 26'; Bedenko 16'; Čepo 37'	Report	Medvikova 12', 21', 33'; Čapová 14'

Umpires:
Maarten Boxma (NED)
Ilaria Amorosini (ITA)

17 January 2026
14:15

Finland	0–25	Turkey
	Report	Paksoy 4', 18', 20', 25', 34', 37'; Gültekin 7', 8', 15', 30', 32', 38', 40'; Okumuş 7', 21'; Başbuğ 9', 12'; Baran 10', 26', 35', 37'; Kendir 24', 31', 34', 38'

Umpires:
Christian Phillips-Adams (WAL)
Thalia Bellemans (BEL)

17 January 2026
15:30

Sweden	3–4	Italy
Moberg 24', 28'; Thien 39'	Report	Di Paola 2', 22'; Brea 21', 32'

Umpires:
Ellie Duffy (IRL)
Alexandra Pollex (GER)

17 January 2026
17:00

Croatia	10–2	Portugal
Nizek 14', 29', 30'; H. Buzjak 19'; Rubeša 30'; Hrupec 32'; Bedenko 37', 37'; Čolić 38', 39'	Report	Nogueira 9'; Cardoso 32'

Umpires:
Sophie Parker (ENG)
Thalia Bellemans (BEL)

17 January 2026
19:00

Slovakia	9–2	Finland
Medvikova 1', 10', 12', 28', 38'; Horáčková 8'; Vyskočová 13', 23', 31'	Report	Anttonen 22', 36'

Umpires:
Alexandra Pollex (GER)
Serap Yürükoğlu (TUR)

17 January 2026
20:15

Italy	4–4	Turkey
Di Bella 7', 28'; Di Paola 24'; Bormida 35'	Report	Gültekin 3', 33'; Okumuş 9'; Kendir 32'

Umpires:
Arlette Bloks (NED)
Sophie Parker (ENG)

17 January 2026
21:30

Portugal	0–4	Sweden
	Report	Thien 12', 34'; Justus 38'; Lindström 40'

Umpires:
Serap Yürükoğlu (TUR)
Christian Phillips-Adams (WAL)

18 January 2026
11:30

Slovakia	3–4	Sweden
Medvikova 14', 25'; Vyskočová 27'	Report	Thien 7', 33'; Guitink 19' von Blanquet 27'

Umpires:
Ellie Duffy (IRL)
Ilaria Amorosini (ITA)

18 January 2026
12:45

Croatia	0–7	Italy
	Report	Puglisi 10'; Brea 13'; Di Paola 23', 33'; Perani 24'; Torbol 29'; Vittoria 33'

Umpires:
Serap Yürükoğlu (TUR)
Arlette Bloks (NED)

18 January 2026
14:00

Portugal	0–13	Turkey
	Report	Gültekin 3', 19', 19', 33', 35', 38', 40'; Kendir 5', 24', 37'; Şahiner 10'; Paksoy 11'; Okumuş 14'

Umpires:
Ilaria Amorosini (ITA)
Maarten Boxma (NED)

18 January 2026
15:15

Sweden	18–0	Finland
Thien 1', 16' von Blanquet 7', 11', 13', 14', 19', 26', 26', 27', 35', 39', 39'; Moberg 15', 21'; Lindström 18', 24'; La. Schrader 31'	Report

Umpires:
Thalia Bellemans (BEL)
Sophie Parker (ENG)

18 January 2026
16:30

Italy	6–2	Slovakia
Brea 8', 19'; Puglisi 12', 23'; Torbol 27'; Di Bella 32'	Report	Kramplova 5', 34'

Umpires:
Maarten Boxma (NED)
Christian Phillips-Adams (WAL)

18 January 2026
17:45

Croatia	5–6	Turkey
Hrupec 1'; Nizek 20'; Čepo 30', 39'; Buzjak 36'	Report	Gültekin 5', 40'; Okumuş 16'; Kendir 35', 38', 38'

Umpires:
Ellie Duffy (IRL)
Thalia Bellemans (BEL)

18 January 2026
19:00

Portugal	5–1	Finland
Sousa 19'; Nogueira 25', 36'; Nunes 27'; Leitão 38'	Report	Malkamäki 40'

Umpires:
Arlette Bloks (NED)
Alexandra Pollex (GER)

== See also ==
- 2026 Men's EuroHockey Indoor Championship II
- 2026 Women's EuroHockey Indoor Championship
