= Ece Şahiner =

Turkish field hockey and indoor hockey player (born 2000)

Personal information
- Born: 17 July 2000 (age 26) Kırıkkale, Turkey

Sport
- Sport: Field hockey
- Club: Gaziantep Polisgücü SK
National team
Years	Team	Caps	Goals
–	Turkey		-
Medal record
Representing Turkey
Women's Indoor hockey
EuroHockey Championship II
Gold medal – first place	2026 Lousada	Team
Silver medal – second place	2020 Sveti Ivan Zelina	Team
Women's Field hockey
EuroHockey Championship III
Silver medal – second place	2025 Alanya	Team
Bronze medal – third place	2021 Lipovci	Team

Ece Şahiner (born 17 July 2000) is a Turkish field and indoor hockey player. She is a member of Gaziantep Polisgücü SK and part of the Turkey national field and indoor hockey teams.

== Club career ==
Şahiner started playing volleyball in her hometown.She then turned to indoor hockey at the age of thirteen upon the advice of her coach.

She played for her hometown club Kırıkkale GSK already in the 2015–16 season of the Turkish Women's Field Hockey First League. Her team became champion in the 2017–18 Women's Field Hockey First League. Her team was promoted to the Women's Field Hockey Super League in the next season, and she was named the Top goalscorer. Her team finished the 2021–22 Women's Indoor Hockey Super League season on the fourth place, but she became once again Top goalscorer .

As part of the Güney Eziler SK in Güney, Denizli, she was instrumental for her team's champions title winning the 2022–23 Women's Indoor Hockey First League, and their promotion to the Women's Indoor Hockey Super League in the next season. She was named Top goalscorer with 43 goals in seven matches.

In 2023, she served as the coach of the girls' field hockey team of Karakeçili Atatürk Secondary School, which, representing Kırıkkale Province, became champion at the Turkey School Sports Hockey Tournament in Muğla.

In March 2024, she transferred to the Menteşe, Muğla-based club Ege Yıldızları SK, which strengethened their team for the participation at the upcoming EuroHıckey Indoor Club Cup. . She played at the 2025 Women's EuroHockey Indoor Club Cup in Šiauliai, Lithuania.

She is a member of Gaziantep Polisgücü SK.

== International career ==
=== Indoor hockey ===
Şahiner was included into the national U16 indoor hockey team in 2015.

She played for the national indoor hockey team at the Women's EuroHockey Indoor Championship II, won the silver medal in 20 in Sveti Ivan Zelina, Croatia, and captured the gold medal in 2026 in Lousada, Portugal.

=== Field hockey ===
In 2016, Şahiner was invited to the national U16 field hockey team.

As a member of the national field hockey team, she played at the Women's EuroHockey Championship III, took the bronze medal in 2021 in Lipovci, Slovenia, and the silver medal in 2025 in Alanya, Turkey.

== Personal life ==
Born on 17 July 2000, Ece Şahiner is a natve of Kırıkkale, Turkey.

After finishing the high school, she attended Kırıkkale University in 2019, and studied in the Department of Physical Education and Sports Teaching in the Faculty of Sports Science.

== Honours ==
=== Club ===
Turkish Women's Field Hockey First League

Kırıkkale GSK
Champions (1): 2017–18

Turkish Women's Indoor Hockey First League

Güney Eziler SK
Champions (1): 2022–23

=== International ===
Turkey indoor hockey team

Women's EuroHockey Indoor Championship II
Champions (1): 2026
Runners-up (1): 2020

Turkey women's national field hockey team

Women's EuroHockey Championship III
Runners-up (1): 2025
Third place (1): 2021

=== Individual ===
Most Valuable Player
Top goalscorer
2017–18 Women's Field Hockey First League (Kırıkkale GSK)

2017–18 Women's Field Hockey First League (Kırıkkale GSK)
2021–22 Women's Indoor Hockey Super League (Kırıkkale GSK)
2022–23 Women's Indoor Hockey First league (Güney Eziler SK)
