= 2023 Men's EuroHockey Championship III =

Field hockey tournament

Tournament details
- Host country: Poland
- City: Skierniewice
- Dates: 23–29 July
- Teams: 6 (from 1 confederation)

Final positions
- Champions: Poland (1st title)
- Runner-up: Croatia
- Third place: Gibraltar

Tournament statistics
- Matches played: 15
- Goals scored: 112 (7.47 per match)
- Top scorer: (Poland) Eryk Bembenek (11 goals)
- Best player: (Poland) Mateusz Nowakowski
- Best goalkeeper: (Gibraltar) Joseph Borg

The 2023 Men's EuroHockey Championship III was the tenth edition of the Men's EuroHockey Championship III, the third level of the men's European field hockey championships organized by the European Hockey Federation. It was held from 23 to 29 July 2023 in Skierniewice, Poland.

== Qualification ==
Four teams qualified based on their performance in the 2023 Men's EuroHockey Championship Qualifiers, with the fourth-placed teams qualifying for the Championship III. The other teams qualified based on their FIH Men's World Ranking.

Dates	Event	Location	Quotas	Qualifiers
17–20 August 2022	EuroHockey Championship Qualifiers	Ourense, Spain	1	Poland
23–26 August 2022	EuroHockey Championship Qualifiers	Vienna, Austria	1	Croatia
24–27 August 2022	EuroHockey Championship Qualifiers	Calais, France	1	Lithuania
24–27 August 2022	EuroHockey Championship Qualifiers	Glasgow, Scotland	1	Gibraltar
21 September 2022	FIH Men's World Ranking	—N/a	2	Malta; Serbia
Total			6	

== Points table ==
Pos	Team	Pld	W	D	L	GF	GA	GD	Pts
1	Poland (H)	5	5	0	0	45	1	+44	15
2	Croatia	5	4	0	1	22	10	+12	12
3	Gibraltar	5	3	0	2	16	16	0	9
4	Malta	5	1	1	3	14	16	−2	4
5	Lithuania	5	1	1	3	13	18	−5	4
6	Serbia	5	0	0	5	2	51	−49	0

Source: FIH
Rules for classification: 1) points; 2) matches won; 3) goal difference; 4) goals for; 5) head-to-head result; 6) field goals for.
(H) Hosts

== Matches ==
24 July 2023
10:30

Croatia	3–1	Lithuania
Jazbec 24'; Žlimen 37'; Fujs 37'	Report	Ridlauskas 14'

Umpires:
Marius Cuadrat (ESP)
Sammy Howard (GIB)

24 July 2023
12:45

Gibraltar	3–2	Malta
Bossano-Anes 19'; Lopez 22'; Balban 32'	Report	Z. Degiovanni 50'; S. Plaehn 60'

Umpires:
Lukasz Zwierzchowski (POL)
Karolis Donculas (LTU)

24 July 2023
18500

Poland	23–0	Serbia
Nowakowski 1'; Jarzynski 2', 14', 25', 29', 43', 49', 60', 60'; Pawlak 19'; Bembenek 21', 34', 41', 48'; Jarzembowski 23', 47', 48'; Popowski 38'; Małecki 38'; Głowacki 39'; Kurowski 53'; Koperski 58'; Wachowiak 59'	Report

Umpires:
David Sweetman (SCO)
Andrija Flikač (CRO)

25 July 2023
13:30

Gibraltar	7–2	Lithuania
Lopez 2'; Hernandez 14', 60'; Balban 25'; Caetano 38', 51'; Bossano-Anes 39'	Report	Jackevicius 12'; Ridlauskas 44'

Umpires:
David Sweetman (SCO)
Edward Hughes (MLT)

25 July 2023
15:45

Serbia	0–7	Croatia
	Report	Sluga 8'; Krleža 16', 17', 20', 27'; Fujs 38', 60'

Umpires:
Lukasz Zwierzchowski (POL)
Sammy Howard (GIB)

25 July 2023
18:00

Poland	6–0	Malta
Bembenek 15', 51', 60'; Kurowski 26'; Nowakowski 36'; Pawlak 57'	Report

Umpires:
Andrija Filkač (CRO)
Karolis Donculas (LTU)

26 July 2023
13:30

Serbia	0–5	Gibraltar
	Report	Balban 6', 36'; Stagno 21'; Hernandez 22'; Cerisola 55'

Umpires:
Karolis Donculas (LTU)
David Sweetman (SCO)

26 July 2023
15:45

Lithuania	2–2	Malta
Stankevič 15'; Pocevicius 27'	Report	T. Degiovanni 54'; Z. Degiovanni 59'

Umpires:
Lukasz Zwierzchowski (POL)
Sammy Howard (GIB)

26 July 2023
18:00

Croatia	1–6	Poland
Fujs 29'	Report	Koperski 18'; Nowakowski 19'; Bembenek 20', 22'; Jarzembowski 24', 27'

Umpires:
Edward Hughes (MLT)
Marius Cuadrat (ESP)

28 July 2023
10:00

Lithuania	8–2	Serbia
Balbatunovas 13', 29'; Sinkevičius 17', 34'; Aleknavičius 27'; Pocevicius 28'; Ridlauskas 30'; Stankevič 54'	Report	Losonci 16'; Marjanušić 45'

Umpires:
Edward Hughes (MLT)
Andrija Filkač (CRO)

28 July 2023
12:15

Malta	2–5	Croatia
Chircop 15'; Calleja 57'	Report	Krajinović 21'; Ćaćić 27'; Fujs 34'; Sluga 36'; Mesarić 39'

Umpires:
Lukasz Zwierzchowski (POL)
Sammy Howard (GIB)

28 July 2023
14:30

Gibraltar	0–6	Poland
	Report	Rutkowski 1', 16', 37', 60'; Bembenek 18'; Małecki 55'

Umpires:
David Sweetman (SCO)
Marius Cuadrat (ESP)

29 July 2023
09:30

Malta	8–0	Serbia
T. Degiovanni 6', 58', 60+'; Calleja 21'; Agius 22'; Z. Degiovanni 29'; Bajada 52'; Zahra 57'	Report

Umpires:
David Sweetman (SCO)
Marius Cuadrat (ESP)

29 July 2023
11:45

Croatia	6–1	Gibraltar
Krleža 9', 17'; Fujs 22'; Grugurev 23'; Ćaćić 40'; Zlatar 59'	Report	Hernandez 7'

Umpires:
Lukasz Zwierzchowski (POL)
Karolis Donculas (LTU)

29 July 2023
14:00

Poland	4–0	Lithuania
Rutkowski 12'; Małecki 26'; Pawlak 28'; Bembenek 36'	Report

Umpires:
Edward Hughes (MLT)
Andrija Filkač (CRO)

== Final standings ==
Rank	Team
1st place, gold medalist(s)	Poland
2nd place, silver medalist(s)	Croatia
3rd place, bronze medalist(s)	Gibraltar
4	Malta
5	Lithuania
6	Serbia

== See also ==
- 2023 Men's EuroHockey Championship II
- 2023 Women's EuroHockey Championship III
