= 2023 Women's EuroHockey Championship III =

Tenth edition of the Women's EuroHockey Championship III

Tournament details
- Host country: Croatia
- City: Zagreb
- Dates: 25–29 July
- Teams: 4 (from 1 confederation)

Final positions
- Champions: Turkey (2nd title)
- Runner-up: Switzerland
- Third place: Gibraltar

Tournament statistics
- Matches played: 8
- Goals scored: 25 (3.13 per match)
- Top scorer: (Turkey) Fatma Songül Gültekin (6 goals)
- Best player: (Turkey) Fatma Songül Gültekin
- Best goalkeeper: (Gibraltar) Isabelle Edwards

The 2023 Women's EuroHockey Championship III was the tenth edition of the Women's EuroHockey Championship III, the third level of the women's European field hockey championships organized by the European Hockey Federation. It was held from 25 to 29 July 2023 in Zagreb, Croatia.

Turkey won their second EuroHockey Championship III title by defeating Switzerland 3–1 in the final. Gibraltar won the bronze medal by defeating the hosts Croatia 2–1 in the third-place match.

== Preliminary round ==
All times are local (UTC+2).

=== Pool A ===
| Pos | Team | Pld | W | D | L | GF | GA | GD | Pts | Qualification |
|---|---|---|---|---|---|---|---|---|---|---|
| 1 | Turkey | 3 | 2 | 1 | 0 | 11 | 1 | +10 | 7 | Final |
| 2 | Switzerland | 3 | 1 | 2 | 0 | 5 | 1 | +4 | 5 | Final |
| 3 | Croatia (H) | 3 | 1 | 1 | 1 | 2 | 4 | −2 | 4 | Third place match |
| 4 | Gibraltar | 3 | 0 | 0 | 3 | 0 | 12 | −12 | 0 | Third place match |

Source: FIH
Rules for classification: 1) points; 2) matches won; 3) goal difference; 4) goals for; 5) head-to-head result; 6) field goals for.
(H) Hosts

25 July 2023
15:45

| Switzerland | 4–0 | Gibraltar |
|---|---|---|
| Verburg 22'; Zepf 31'; Stomps 43'; Pfister 49' | Report |

Umpires:
Lizelotte Wolter (NED)
Seyma Gozey (TUR)

25 July 2023
18:00

| Turkey | 4–0 | Croatia |
|---|---|---|
| Şahiner 3'; Kendir 41'; Gültekin 45'; Çinar 45' | Report |

Umpires:
Evelien Plug (NED)
Zamara Espinosa (GIB)

26 July 2023
15:45

| Switzerland | 1–1 | Turkey |
|---|---|---|
| Zimmermann 40' | Report | Çinar 49' |

Umpires:
Lizelotte Wolter (NED)
Zamara Espinosa (GIB)

26 July 2023
18:00

| Croatia | 2–0 | Gibraltar |
|---|---|---|
| Bedenko 23'; Stelnyk 35' | Report |

Umpires:
Evelien Plug (NED)
Seyma Gozey (TUR)

28 July 2023
12:15

| Turkey | 6–0 | Gibraltar |
|---|---|---|
| Gültekin 10', 27', 37'; Taşkiran 16'; Kendir 49'; Paksoy 60' | Report |

Umpires:
Lizelotte Wolter (NED)
Evelien Plug (NED)

28 July 2023
14:30

| Croatia | 0–0 | Switzerland |
|---|---|---|
| | Report |

Umpires:
Zamara Espinosa (GIB)
Seyma Gozey (TUR)

== First to fourth place classification ==
=== Third place match ===
29 July 2023
10:15

| Croatia | 1–2 | Gibraltar |
|---|---|---|
| Čavrak 37' | Report | Olivero 12'; Bossano-Annes 29' |

Umpires:
Evelien Plug (NED)
Seyma Gozey (TUR)

=== Final ===
29 July 2023
12:30

| Turkey | 3–1 | Switzerland |
|---|---|---|
| Gültekin 17', 50'; Çinar 52' | Report | Zepf 58' |

Umpires:
Lizelotte Wolter (NED)
Zamara Espinosa (GIB)

== Final standings ==
| Pos | Team |
|---|---|
| 1 | Turkey |
| 2 | Switzerland |
| 3 | Gibraltar |
| 4 | Croatia (H) |

Source: FIH
(H) Host

== See also ==
- 2023 Women's EuroHockey Championship II
- 2023 Men's EuroHockey Championship III
