= Fatma Songül Gültekin =

Turkish footballer and hockey player (born 1997)

Personal information
- Born: 5 November 1997 (age 28) Şahinbey, Gaziantep, Turkey

Sport
- Sport: Field hockey
- Position: Forward
- Club: Gaziantep Polisgücü SK
National team
Years	Team	Caps	Goals
–	Turkey	20	(22)
Medal record
Women's Field hockey
Representing Turkey
EuroHockey Indoor Championship II
Silver medal – second place	2020 Sveti Ivan Zelina	Team
EuroHockey Field Championship III
Gold medal – first place	2023 Zagreb	Team
Bronze medal – third place	2021 Lipovci	Team
Gold medal – first place	2017 Sveti Ivan Zelina	Team
Bronze medal – third place	2015 Sveti Ivan Zelina	Team
Association football career
Senior career*
Years	Team	Apps	(Gls)
2011–2013	Gaziantep Fıstık Spor	7	(4)
2015–2016	→ALG Spor	8	(10)
2015–2016	Güneykent Spor	17	(6)
2017–2018	ALG Spor	18	(35)
2019	1207 Antalya Spor	6	(1)
2019–2020	Gaziantep Asya S.K.	2	(4)
Total		58	(60)
- * Club domestic league appearances and goals

Fatma Songül Gültekin (born 5 November 1997) is a Turkish field hockey, hockey5s and indoor hockey forward player for Gaziantep Polisgücü SK, and a former football player. She is part of Turkey women's national hockey teams.

== Football career ==
Gültekin started playing football already in primary school. In May 2011, she obtained her license from the local club Gaziantep Fıstık Spor. In the 2011–12 and 2012–13 Second League, she played in seven matches and scored four goals for her team Gaziantep Fıstık Spor. After a break of two years, she transferred in the 2015–16 Third League to Güneykent Spor, and was loaned out to ALG Spot. She netted ten goals in eight matches for ALG Spor. In the 2016–17 Third League season, she played 17 matches for Güneykent Spor and scored six goals. In the last game of the season, she moved to ALG Spor, which became league champion following the play-offs, and was promoted to the Second League. ALG Spor became champion after the 2017–18 Second League season, and was promoted to the First League. She played in the first half of the 2018–19 First League season. After netting 35 goals in 18 matches for ALG Spor, she transferred to 1207 Antalya Spor in the league's second half. She played six matches and scored one goal for 1207 Antalya Sporin the Second League. For the 2019–20 Third League, she signed with the Gaziantep Asya S.K. She had four goals in two matches.

In her football career as a forward, between January 2012 and March 2020 with a two-year break, she capped in 58 matches and recorded 60 goals in total.

== Hockey career ==
Gültekin met hockey sport in 2011 while playing football at that time. She took part in training for hockey two days a week in addition to five-day long football training. After gaining a certain level of progress in hockey, she tried hard to perform both sports at the same time. She became a forward player in hockey thanks to the same attacker position, she had in football. Finally, she preferred hockey to football.

She plays for Gaziantep Polisgücü SK in the THF Women's Field Hpckey Super League (Turkish: THF Kadınlar Açık Alan Hokey Süper Ligi, KAAHSL) and the THF Women's Indoor Hockey Super League (Turkish: THF Kadınlar Salon Hokeyi Süper Ligi, KSHSL). As of the end of 2023, she scored 323 goals in 116 league matches in total.

=== Indoor hockey ===
In the 2019–20 KSHSL season, she was with Atılım Muğla Olimpik.Her team finished the league at rank four. She was named top goalscorer of the league season.

Gültekin became the top goalscorer with 70 goals netted in the 2020 KSHSL season, which her team Gaziantep Polisgücü SK finished as champion.

Her team, Gaziantep Polisgücü, finished the 2019–20 THF Indoor Super League as champion.

She was part of the team, which became runners-up at the 2023–24 THF Women's Indoor Hockey League after losing to Ege Yıldızları SK in the final.

Gültekin was part of the national team, which finished the 2024 Women's EuroHockey Indoor Championship in Berlin, Germany, in ninth place. She became the top goal scorer of the competition with nine goals.

=== Field hockey ===
Her team, Gaziantep Polisgücü, won the 2018–19 THF Women's Field Hpckey Super League season.

In 2022, she enjoyed her team's champions title in the THF Women's Field Hockey Super League.

She was part of the Gaziantep Polisgücü team in the 2022–23 THF Women's Field Hockey League, which became runners-up after the play-offs.

As a member of Gaziantep Polisgücü, she was named MVP of the EuroHockey Club Trophy II – Women 2024 in Alanya, Turkey.

== International hockey career ==
In 2017, Gültekin was selected to the Turkey women's national under 21 indoor hockey team for preparations for the 2017 Women's EuroHockey Junior Championship II.

She is part of the Turkey field hockey team and the Turkey indoor hockey team . >She netted 22 goals in 20 international matches.

=== Indoor hockey ===
Gültekin was part of the national indoor hockey team at the 2020 Women's EuroHockey Indoor Championship II held in Sveti Ivan Zelina, Croatia. Turkey finished the tournament as runners-up. She played at the 2022 Women's EuroHockey Indoor Championship in Hamburg, Germany, where the national team ranked sixth.

=== Hockey5s ===
In June 2023, Gültekin took part in the Women's EuroHockey5s Championship in Wałcz, Poland. Turkey ranked fifth among ten participating nations.

=== Field hockey ===
Gültekin played for the national field hockey team in the Women's EuroHockey Championship III in 2015 at Sveti Ivan Zelina, Croatia, 2017 at Sveti Ivan Zelina, Croatia, 2021 at Lipovci, Slovenia, and 2023 at Zagreb, Croatia, She won two gold medals, in 2017, 2023, and two bronze medals in 2015, 2021 with the national team.

== Personal life ==
Fatma Songül Gültekin was born in the Şahinbey district of Gaziantep, southeastern Turkey on 5 November 1997.

She studied at the Faculty of Sports Science of Gaziantep University.

== Honours ==
=== Clubs ===
Turkish Women's Football Third League

ALG Spor
Champions (1): 2016–17

Turkish Women's Football Second League

ALG Spor
Champions (1): 2017–18

THF Women's Indoor Hockey Championship

Gaziantep Polisgücü SK
Champions (1): 2020,

THF Women's Field Hockey Championship

Gaziantep Polisgücü SK
Champions (2): 2018–19, 2021–22.
Runners-up (1): 2022–23.

THF Women's Indoor Hockey League

Gaziantep Polisgücü SK
Runners-up (1): 2023–24.

=== International ===
Women's EuroHockey Indoor Championship II

Turkey women's indoor hockey
Runners-up (1): 2020.

Women's EuroHockey Championship III

Turkey women's field hockey
Champions (2): 2017, 2023.
Third places (2): 2015. 2021,

=== Individual ===
Most Valuable Player (2)
2023 Women's EuroHockey Championship III,
EuroHockey Club Trophy II – Women 2024.

Top Goalscorer (4)
2019–20 KSHSL (Atılım Muğla Olimpik),
2020–21 KSHSL (Gaziantep Polisgücü SK (70 goals),
2023 Women's EuroHockey Championship III (Turkey),
2024 Women's EuroHockey Indoor Championship (9 goals)
