= Ege Yıldızları SK =

Indoor and field hockey club

- Full name: Kaltun Madran Su Ege Yıldızları Spor Julübü
- League: Turkish Women's Indoor Hockey Super League; Turkish Women's Field Hockey First League
- Founded: 18 May 2010; 16 years ago

Personnel
- President: Serdar Şen
- Coach: Serkan Şen

Ege Yıldızları Spor Kulübü , also known as Kaltun Madran Su Ege Yıldızları Spor Kulübü for sponsorship reasons, is a Turkish women's indoor and field hockey club based in Menteşe, Muğla, southwestern Turkey. It was established on 18 May 2010. Club chairman is Serkan Şen, who serves also head coch of both hockey sides. They play in the Turkish Women's Indoor Hockey Super League and Turkish Women's Field Hockey First League.

== History ==
=== Indorr hockey ===
The indoor hockey team finished the 2023–24 Turkish Women's Indoor Hockey Super League season as champion. They took part at the 2025 Women's EuroHockey Indoor Club Cup in Šiauliai, Lithuania. They finished the 2024–25 Super League season in third place.

League standings
League	Season	Rank	Ref.
Indoor Second	2018–19	1st place, gold medalist(s)	
Indoor First	2019–20	4th	
Indoor First	2020–21	4th	
Indoor First	2021–22	3rd place, bronze medalist(s)	
Indoor First	2022–23	1st place, gold medalist(s)	
Indoor Super	2023–24	1st place, gold medalist(s)	
Indoor Super	2024–25	3rd place, bronze medalist(s)	
Indoor Super	2025–26	6th	

=== Field hockey ===
The girls' U16 field hockey team came third at the 2024–25 Turkish Girls' U16 Hockey5s First League. The field hockey team became champion in the 2025–26 Turkish Women's Field Hockey First League season .

League standings
League	Season	Rank	Ref.
Indoor First	2025–26	1st place, gold medalist(s)	

== Current squad ==
=== Indoor hockey ===
As of 2025–26.

Head coach: (Turkey) Serdar Şen

No.	Pos.	Nation	Player
1		TUR	Arzu Nur Öztürk
2		TUR	Aleyna Başbuğ
3		TUR	Elif Şura Erciyas
4		TUR	Necmiye Sel
7		TUR	Aleyna Satılmış
10		TUR	Sıla AleynaÇelebi

No.	Pos.	Nation	Player
11		TUR	Sude Nur Kurt
16		TUR	Nilay Nur Öztürk
17		TUR	Zelihe Çakmak
18		TUR	Zeren Akyol
19		TUR	Hilal Yıldız
20		TUR	Cansu Yasan

=== Field hockey ===
As of 2025–26.

Head coach: (Turkey) Serdar Şen

No.	Pos.	Nation	Player
1		TUR	Arzu Nur Öztürk
2		TUR	Aleyna Başbuğ
3		TUR	Ayşegül Uğur
4		TUR	Necmiye Sel
5		TUR	Tuanna Sel
6		TUR	Ezgi Özdemir
7		TUR	Aleyna Satılmış
8		TUR	Nur Nebi Baran
9		TUR	Sude Nur Kurt
10		TUR	Sıla Ayna Çelebi

No.	Pos.	Nation	Player
11		TUR	Fatma İrem Akça
12		TUR	Zeynep Rüveyda Durukan
13		TUR	Selin Günay
14		TUR	Zeren Akyol
15		TUR	Dilan Azra
16		TUR	Nilay Nur Öztürk
17		TUR	Ela Turaş
18		TUR	Cansu Yasan
20		TUR	Hiranur Baran

== Former notable players ==
Turkey

- Zeliha Kendir
- Gülcan Paksoy
- Ece Şahiner

== International participations ==
As of April 2026.

=== Indoor hockey ===
Year	Host	Competition	Result
2025	LTU, Šiauliai	EuroHockey Indoor Club Cup	7th

== Former squads ==
- 2023–24 Turkish Women's Indoor Hockey Super League - (gold) champions

2 Aleyna Başbuğ, 3 Zeliha Çakmak, 4 Cemile Nihal Yörük, 5 Hülya Nur Pak, 6 Irmak Çalışkan, 7 Ruken Özmen, 9 Sude Nur Kurt, 10 Zeliha Kendir,11 Zeren Akyol, 12 Ecrin Çelikoğlu, 13 Gülcan Paksoy, 15 Nurcan Özger, 17 Hilal Yıldız, 22 Sedanur Bayram, 25 Miss Jirattchaya Tokaeww, 31 Elif Bacak. Head coach: (Turkey) Serkan Şen.

- 2025–26 Turkish Women's Field Hockey First League - (gold) champions

1 Arzu Nur Öztürk, 2 Aleyna Başbuğ, 3 Ayşegül Uğur, 4 Necmiye Sel, 5 Tuanna Sel, 6 Ezgi Özdemir, 7 Aleyna Satılmış, 8 Nur Nebi Baran, 9 Sude Nur Kurt, 10 Sıla Ayna Çelebi, 11 Fatma İrem Akça, 12 Zeynep Rüveyda Durukan, 13 Selin Günay, 14 Zeren Akyol, 15 Dilan Azra, 16 Nilay Nur Öztürk, 17 Ela Turaş, 18 Cansu Yasan, 20 Hiranur Baran]. Head coach: (Turkey) Serkan Şen.
