= 2022 Women's EuroHockey Indoor Championship =

Tournament details
- Host country: Germany
- City: Hamburg
- Dates: 7–10 December
- Teams: 6 (from 1 confederation)
- Venue: Alsterdorfer Sporthalle

Final positions
- Champions: Germany (16th title)
- Runner-up: Netherlands
- Third place: Ukraine

Tournament statistics
- Matches played: 18
- Goals scored: 133 (7.39 per match)
- Top scorer: (Germany) Lisa Altenburg (14 goals)

The 2022 Women's EuroHockey Indoor Championship was the 21st edition of the Women's EuroHockey Indoor Championship, the biennial international women's indoor hockey championship of Europe organized by the European Hockey Federation.

It was originally planned to be held alongside the men's tournament from 12 to 16 January 2022 at the Alsterdorfer Sporthalle in Hamburg, Germany. However on 22 December 2021, the tournament was postponed to 7 to 11 December 2022 due to the COVID-19 pandemic in Europe.

== Qualified teams ==
Participating nations have qualified based on their final ranking from the 2020 competition.

Dates	Event	Location	Quotas	Qualifiers
24–26 January 2020	2020 EuroHockey Indoor Championship	Minsk, Belarus	5	Austria; ~~Belarus~~ (Note: Belarus and Russia are excluded from the tournament due to their involvement in the 2022 Russian invasion of Ukraine.); Czech Republic; Germany; Netherlands; Ukraine
24–26 January 2020	2020 EuroHockey Indoor Championship II	Sveti Ivan Zelina, Croatia	1	~~Russia~~; Turkey
Total			6	

== Preliminary round ==
=== Pool ===
Pos	Team	Pld	W	D	L	GF	GA	GD	Pts	Qualification
1	Germany (H)	5	5	0	0	40	6	+34	15	Final
2	Netherlands	5	4	0	1	27	7	+20	12	Final
3	Austria	5	2	1	2	10	21	−11	7	Third place game
4	Ukraine	5	2	1	2	17	32	−15	7	Third place game
5	Czech Republic	5	1	0	4	10	23	−13	3	Fifth place game
6	Turkey	5	0	0	5	14	29	−15	0	Fifth place game

Source: EuroHockey
Rules for classification: 1) points; 2) matches won; 3) goal difference; 4) goals for; 5) head-to-head result; 6) field goals scored.
(H) Hosts

7 December 2022
10:30

Ukraine	7–3	Czech Republic
Honcharenko 4', 30', 40'; Shevchenko 10'; Khilko 16'; Shokalenko 23'; Ponomarenko 24'	Report	Hájková 11', 39'; Babická 13'

Umpires:
Ilaria Amorsoini (ITA)
Sophie Bockelmann (GER)

7 December 2022
11:45

Netherlands	7–0	Austria
Van Erk 6'; Brands 15'; Van Wijk 18'; De Baat 28', 33'; De Geus 37'; Zwinkels 40'	Report

Umpires:
Abby MacArthur (WAL)
Rachel Williams (ENG)

7 December 2022
13:00

Germany	11–2	Turkey
Zimmermann 7', 10'; Altenburg 8', 16', 22', 34', 35'; Maertens 8', 23'; Schröder 31', 39'	Report	Bahçivan 11'; Kendir 40'

Umpires:
Gemma Jones (ENG)
Kamile Mockaitytė (LTU)

7 December 2022
17:00

Netherlands	3–0	Czech Republic
Imhof 8'; De Geus 28'; De Baat 38'	Report

Umpires:
Gema Calderón (ESP)
Rachel Williams (ENG)

7 December 2022
18:15

Turkey	6–7	Ukraine
Gültekin 2', 6', 10'; Çinar 15', 24'; Kendir 34'	Report	Shevchenko 3'; Honcharenko 11', 25', 36', 36'; Shokalenko 29', 33'

Umpires:
Abby MacArthur (WAL)
Gemma Jones (ENG)

7 December 2022
19:30

Germany	8–0	Austria
Pieper 2'; Altenburg 6', 35'; Strauss 18', 27', 38', 40'; Huse 28'	Report

Umpires:
Ilaria Amorsoini (ITA)
Kamile Mockaitytė (LTU)

8 December 2022
13:15

Turkey	2–3	Netherlands
Gültekin 16'; Çinar 33'	Report	Van Wijk 4', 40'; Imhof 12'

Umpires:
Sophie Bockelmann (GER)
Kamile Mockaitytė (LTU)

8 December 2022
14:30

Czech Republic	2–3	Austria
Duchková 21'; Laciná 33'	Report	Czech 23', 29'; Steyrer 25'

Umpires:
Gema Calderón (ESP)
Gemma Jones (ENG)

8 December 2022
15:45

Ukraine	0–9	Germany
	Report	Maertens 6', 9', 30', 37'; Altenburg 21', 24'; Zimmermann 26', 34'; Hauke 25'

Umpires:
Ilaria Amorsoini (ITA)
Abby MacArthur (WAL)

9 December 2022
09:30

Austria	2–2	Ukraine
Buchta 18'; Steyrer 30'	Report	Kernoz 24', 40'

Umpires:
Sophie Bockelmann (GER)
Abby MacArthur (WAL)

9 December 2022
10:45

Czech Republic	3–2	Turkey
Hájková 4'; Duchková 16'; Laciná 26'	Report	Çinar 7'; Gültekin 10'

Umpires:
Kamile Mockaitytė (LTU)
Gemma Jones (ENG)

9 December 2022
12:00

Netherlands	2–4	Germany
Van Heugten 2'; Brands 13'	Report	Pieper 16'; Maertens 20', 33'; Schröder 35'

Umpires:
Rachel Williams (ENG)
Gema Calderón (ESP)

9 December 2022
17:00

Austria	5–2	Turkey
Czech 9', 9'; Laginja 14'; Felber 38', 39'	Report	Çinar 26', 40'

Umpires:
Gemma Jones (ENG)
Sophie Bockelmann (GER)

9 December 2022
18:15

Germany	8–2	Czech Republic
Altenburg 3', 29', 34'; Zimmermann 8'; Huse 12'; Strauss 25'; Maertens 29', 38'	Report	Lehovcová 37', 40'

Umpires:
Gema Calderón (ESP)
Kamile Mockaitytė (LTU)

9 December 2022
19:30

Ukraine	1–12	Netherlands
Kasianova 37'	Report	Van Heugten 1'; De Baat 10', 40'; De Geus 15'; Van Erk 18'; Zwinkels 21', 22', 39'; Imhof 24'; Van Wijk 28', 39'; Brands 34'

Umpires:
Ilaria Amorsoini (ITA)
Rachel Williams (ENG)

== Classification round ==
=== Fifth place game ===
10 December 2022
12:45

Czech Republic	5–0	Turkey
Duchková 9', 30'; Lehovcová 13'; Babická 33'; Vorlová 39'	Report

Umpires:
Ilaria Amorosini (ITA)
Abby MacArthur (WAL)

=== Third place game ===
10 December 2022
14:10

Austria	0–1	Ukraine
	Report	Ponomarenko 39'

Umpires:
Sophie Bockelmann (GER)
Gemma Calderón (ESP)

=== Final ===
10 December 2022
15:35

Germany	5–4	Netherlands
Maertens 11', 22', 28'; Altenburg 29', 33'	Report	Van Wijk 2'; Imhof 15'; Zwinkels 28', 39'

Umpires:
Rachel Williams (ENG)
Gemma Jones (ENG)

== Statistics ==
=== Final standings ===
1. Germany
2. Netherlands
3. Ukraine
4. Austria
5. Czech Republic
6. Turkey

=== Goalscorers ===
There were 133 goals scored in 18 matches, for an average of 7.39 goals per match.

14 goals

- (Germany) Lisa Altenburg

13 goals

- (Germany) Pia Maertens

7 goals

- (Ukraine) Olha Honcharenko

6 goals

- (Netherlands) Lieke van Wijk
- (Netherlands) Donja Zwinkels
- (Turkey) Perihan Çinar

5 goals

- (Germany) Sara Strauss
- (Germany) Sonja Zimmermann
- (Netherlands) Noor de Baat
- (Turkey) Fatma Songül Gültekin

4 goals

- (Austria) Johanna Czech
- (Czech Republic) Lucie Duchková
- (Netherlands) Pam Imhof

3 goals

- (Czech Republic) Nátalie Hájková
- (Czech Republic) Adéla Lehovcová
- (Germany) Anne Schröder
- (Netherlands) Mabel Brands
- (Netherlands) Anna de Geus
- (Ukraine) Kateryna Shokalenko

2 goals

- (Austria) Fiona Felber
- (Austria) Lisa Steyrer
- (Czech Republic) Nikol Babická
- (Czech Republic) Kateřina Laciná
- (Germany) Viktoria Huse
- (Germany) Cécile Pieper
- (Netherlands) Elin van Erk
- (Netherlands) Laura van Heugten
- (Turkey) Zeliha Kendir
- (Ukraine) Yevheniya Kernoz
- (Ukraine) Oksana Ponomarenko
- (Ukraine) Yulia Shevchenko

1 goal

- (Austria) Daria Buchta
- (Austria) Marta Laginja
- (Czech Republic) Anna Vorlová
- (Germany) Franziska Hauke
- (Turkey) Emine Bahçivan
- (Ukraine) Maryna Khilko
- (Ukraine) Kateryna Kasianova

Source: FIH

== See also ==
- 2022 Women's EuroHockey Indoor Championship II
