= 2026 Men's EuroHockey Indoor Championship II =

2024 Men's EuroHockey Indoor Championship II
Tournament details
- Host countries: Croatia; Norway
- Dates: 9–11 January
- Teams: 11 (from 1 confederation)
- Venue: 2 (in 2 host cities)

Tournament statistics
- Matches played: 27
- Goals scored: 304 (11.26 per match)
- Top scorer(s): (Croatia) Mario Mucić (Ukraine) Vitalii Shevchuk (15 goals)
- Best player: (Denmark) Jesper Jonasson (Ukraine) Vitalii Shevchuk

The 2026 Men's EuroHockey Indoor Championship II was the fifteenth edition of the Men's EuroHockey Indoor Championship II, the second level of the men's European indoor hockey championships organized by the European Hockey Federation.

This was the second edition with a Championship II-A and II-B having equal status, replacing the former Championship II and Championship III. The winner of each event was promoted to the 2028 Championship. The tournaments were held from 9 to 11 January 2026 in Sveti Ivan Zelina, Croatia and Oslo, Norway.

== Qualification ==
Participating teams qualified based on their performance in the 2024 Championships.

=== Qualified teams ===
Dates	Event	Location	Quotas	Qualifiers
1–4 February 2024	2024 Men's EuroHockey Indoor Championship	Leuven, Belgium	2	Croatia; Ukraine
2–4 February 2024	2024 Men's EuroHockey Indoor Championship II	Paredes, Portugal, Budapest, Hungary	6	Denmark; Greece; Hungary; Italy; Lithuania; Norway
—N/a	New entry	—N/a	3	Bulgaria; Slovakia; Sweden
Total			11	

== Championship II-A ==
Tournament details
- Host country: Croatia
- City: Sveti Ivan Zelina
- Dates: 9–11 January 2026
- Teams: 5 (from 1 confederation)
- Venue: Sportska dvorana

Final positions
- Champions: Croatia
- Runner-up: Denmark
- Third place: Slovakia

Tournament statistics
- Matches played: 12
- Goals scored: 137 (11.42 per match)
- Top scorer: (Croatia) Mario Mucić (15 goals)
- Best player: (Denmark) Jesper Jonasson
- Best goalkeeper: (Slovakia) Jakub Bogár

Championship II-A was held at Sportska dvorana in Sveti Ivan Zelina, Croatia from 9 to 11 January 2026. Croatia won their first EuroHockey Indoor Championship II title and were promoted to the 2028 Men's EuroHockey Indoor Championship.

== Round-Robin ==
All times are local (UTC+0).

Pos	Team	Pld	W	D	L	GF	GA	GD	Pts	Promotion
1	Croatia (P, H)	4	4	0	0	42	9	+33	12	Qualification for the Final Match
2	Denmark	4	3	0	1	25	11	+14	9	Qualification for the Final Match
3	Slovakia	4	2	0	2	25	11	+14	6	Qualification for the Third-place match
4	Hungary	4	1	0	3	13	23	−10	3	Qualification for the Third-place match
5	Bulgaria	4	0	0	4	7	58	−51	0	

Source: FIH
Rules for classification: 1) points; 2) matches won; 3) goal difference; 4) goals for; 5) head-to-head result; 6) field goals for.
(H) Hosts; (P) Promoted

9 January 2026
12:00

Denmark	14–1	Bulgaria
Birch-Hald 5'; Sørensen 6', 15', 22'; Hansen 10'; Jonasson 14', 31'; Lund 17', 19'; Nørgaard 18', 27'; Thorsted 20', 22'; Møller 39'	Report	Baklev 11'

Umpires:
Mark Becholz (NED)
Michal Pivko (SVK)

9 January 2026
13:30

Slovakia	8–0	Hungary
Petráš 2', 13'; Blazovsky 6'; Bogar 14', 16'; Augustinič 18', 24'; Romanec 21'	Report

Umpires:
Konstantin Kolev (BUL)
Ivan Grgurev (CRO)

9 January 2026
17:30

Denmark	4–2	Hungary
Birch-Hald 3'; Jonasson 3'; Westrup 6'; Sørensen 39'	Report	Leber 19', 33'

Umpires:
Ivan Grgurev (CRO)
Michal Pivko (SVK)

9 January 2026
19:00

Croatia	22–1	Bulgaria
Krleža 2', 12'; Ilinović 4', 10', 15', 20', 24', 27'; Mucić 8', 10', 11', 17', 19', 29', 40'; Jazbec 12'; M. Bachmann 21', 22', 23', 36', 39'; L. Bachmann 35'	Report	Baklev 35'

Umpires:
Balazs Szalay (HUN)
Walther Larsen (DEN)

10 January 2026
11:30

Hungary	9–3	Bulgaria
Galba 8', 25', 36'; Hortobágyi 18', 19'; Szóga 28', 39'; Csőgör 34'; Patkó 37'	Report	Baklev 12'; Stoyanov 28', 35'

Umpires:
Ivan Grgurev (CRO)
Mark Becholz (NED)

10 January 2026
13:00

Slovakia	2–6	Croatia
Bogar 34'; Augustinič 39'	Report	M. Bachmann 8'; Krleža 10', 25'; Ilinović 16'; L. Bachmann 30'; Mucić 32'

Umpires:
Konstantin Kolev (BUL)
Walther Larsen (DEN)

10 January 2026
17:00

Bulgaria	2–13	Slovakia
Georgiev 11'; Stoyanov 36'	Report	Petráš 4', 12', 13', 15', 27'; Augustinič 17', 28', 34', 37'; Bogar 24'; Krampl 25'; Blazovsky 27'; Garaj 32'

Umpires:
Balazs Szalay (HUN)
Walther Larsen (DEN)

10 January 2026
18:30

Denmark	4–6	Croatia
Jonasson 9', 10'; Thorsted 30'; Nørgaard 33'	Report	Mucić 4', 18', 18'; L. Bachmann 13'; M. Bachmann 17'; Fujs 35'

Umpires:
Michal Pivko (SVK)
Mark Becholz (NED)

11 January 2026
08:30

Slovakia	2–3	Denmark
Augustinič 24'; Petráš 34'	Report	Birch-Hald 4'; Jonasson 32', 38'

Umpires:
Balazs Szalay (HUN)
Ivan Grgurev (CRO)

11 January 2026
10:00

Croatia	8–2	Hungary
L. Bachmann 7', 7', 16', 25', 28'; Mucić 17', 27'; M. Bachmann 23'	Report	Szóga 30'; Suba 31'

Umpires:
Konstantin Kolev (BUL)
Michal Pivko (SVK)

=== Third-place match ===
11 January 2026
13:00

Slovakia	6–4	Hungary
Petráš 1', 18', 34', 35'; Blazovsky 8'; Garaj 21'	Report	Suba 28'; Szóga 30', 39'; Hortobágyi 40'

Umpires:
Walther Larsen (DEN)
Ivan Grgurev (CRO)

=== Final ===
11 January 2026
14:30

Croatia	10–5	Denmark
Mucić 4', 22'; Fujs 15', 30'; Jazbec 27'; L. Bachmann 28', 31', 34', 39'; M. Bachmann 38'	Report	Birch-Hald 13'; Nørgaard 15'; Jonasson 18', 35', 37'

Umpires:
Mark Becholz (NED)
Michal Pivko (SVK)

== Championship II-B ==
Tournament details
- Host country: Norway
- City: Oslo
- Dates: 9–11 January
- Teams: 6 (from 1 confederation)
- Venue: Klemetsrudhallen

Final positions
- Champions: Italy
- Runner-up: Ukraine
- Third place: Lithuania

Tournament statistics
- Matches played: 15
- Goals scored: 167 (11.13 per match)
- Top scorer: (Ukraine) Vitalii Shevchuk (15 goals)
- Best player: (Ukraine) Vitalii Shevchuk
- Best goalkeeper: (Ukraine) Bohdan Tovstolytkin

Championship II-B was held at the Klemetsrudhallen in Oslo, Norway from 9–11 January 2026. Italy won their first EuroHockey Indoor Championship II title and were promoted to the 2028 Men's EuroHockey Indoor Championship by finishing first in the round-robin tournament.

=== Standings ===
Pos	Team	Pld	W	D	L	GF	GA	GD	Pts	Promotion
1	Italy (P)	5	5	0	0	62	7	+55	15	EuroHockey Indoor Championship
2	Ukraine	5	4	0	1	39	15	+24	12	
3	Lithuania	5	3	0	2	24	30	−6	9	
4	Greece	5	2	0	3	16	28	−12	6	
5	Sweden	5	1	0	4	15	39	−24	3	
6	Norway (H)	5	0	0	5	11	48	−37	0	

Source: FIH
Rules for classification: 1) points; 2) matches won; 3) goal difference; 4) goals for; 5) head-to-head result; 6) field goals scored.
(H) Hosts; (P) Promoted

9 January 2026
12:00

Lithuania	8–2	Greece
Sinkevičius 5', 11', 19', 39'; Balsiukas 7'; Burkot 10', 32'; Stankevič 34'	Report	C. Hochhauser 2'; Sideridis 24'

Umpires:
Maksym Perepelytsya (UKR)
Uzair Wafai (NOR)

9 January 2026
13:30

Italy	21–1	Norway
Succi 2', 3', 12', 31', 36', 38'; Lago 5'; Moretto 8'; Faggian 9', 26', 35'; Biocca 11', 32'; Muzzioli 18', 21', 23', 24'; Amorosini 20'; Arosio 29', 34'; Iossa 30'	Report	Leege 14'

Umpires:
Jesus Medinilla (ESP)
Karolis Donculas (LTU)

9 January 2026
15:00

Ukraine	6–1	Sweden
Luppa 9'; Solomianyi 22'; Kaplinskyi 22'; Shevchuk 28', 35'; Dzemukh 34'	Report	Rydin 16'

Umpires:
Oli Brown (IRL)
Alessio Fiorenza (ITA)

9 January 2026
17:30

Italy	5–1	Greece
Muzzioli 2'; Faggian 5', 15'; Garbaccio 8', 36'	Report	Zafiris 27'

Umpires:
Khidash Kiyani Mohammad (NOR)
Maksym Perepelytsya (UKR)

9 January 2026
19:00

Ukraine	13–3	Norway
Onofriiuk 2', 5'; Shevchuk 3', 18', 35'; Kalinchuk 6', 22'; Solomianyi 9', 16', 26', 33'; Zhmereniuk 14'; Kaplinskyi 28'	Report	Janjua 25'; Ab. Singh 35'; Skaugvoll 40'

Umpires:
Jesus Medinilla (ESP)
Elysee Enness-Laporte (GRE)

9 January 2026
20:30

Sweden	5–9	Lithuania
Lunde 1'; Magnusson 15', 38'; Karlsson 16'; Rodewi 18'	Report	Sinkevičius 2', 10', 31', 38'; Stankevic 8', 12'; Lakstauskas 11'; Ridlauskas 20'; Burkot 24'

Umpires:
Alessio Fiorenza (ITA)
Uzair Wafai (NOR)

10 January 2026
10:00

Sweden	1–17	Italy
Magnusson 28'	Report	Amorosini 1'; Muzzioli 1'; Faggian 5', 10', 10', 24', 29'; Lago 15', 30'; Biocca 16', 17', 18', 40'; Iossa 19', 25'; Arosio 20', 29'

Umpires:
Uzair Wafai (NOR)
Elysee Enness-Laporte (GRE)

10 January 2026
11:30

Lithuania	3–8	Ukraine
Stankevic 27'; Balsiukas 29'; Pocevicius 32'	Report	Shevchuk 7', 7', 33', 34'; Onofriiuk 15'; Kaplinksyi 17'; Luppa 17'; Boiko 18'

Umpires:
Oli Brown (IRL)
Khidash Kiyani Mohammad (NOR)

10 January 2026
13:00

Greece	6–3	Norway
C. Hochhauser 7', 23'; Dierckx 12', 15'; Diringer 34'; Zafiris 40'	Report	Ashraf 10'; Garcha 28'; Helgetveit 40'

Umpires:
Karolis Donculas (LTU)
Maksym Perepelytsya (UKR)

10 January 2026
16:00

Italy	6–4	Ukraine
Lago 4'; Muzzioli 7', 22'; Iossa 10'; Biocca 27'; Arosio 34'	Report	Shevchuk 18'; Luppa 28'; Onofriiuk 32'; Solomianyi 34'

Umpires:
Oli Brown (IRL)
Jesus Medinilla (ESP)

10 January 2026
17:30

Greece	5–4	Sweden
C. Hochhauser 4', 29', 33'; Dierckx 28', 39'	Report	Lunde 5'; Karlsson 10', 14'; Rydin 23'

Umpires:
Uzair Wafai (NOR)
Khidash Kiyani Mohammad (NOR)

10 January 2026
19:00

Norway	2–4	Lithuania
Rathore 34'; Asif 39'	Report	Pocevicius 21'; Stankevič 24'; Ridlauskas 24'; Burkot 36'

Umpires:
Elysee Enness-Laporte (GRE)
Alessio Fiorenza (ITA)

11 January 2026
10:00

Lithuania	0–13	Italy
	Report	Succi 2', 3', 31'; Faggian 15', 26', 30', 35'; Biocca 19', 24', 32', 38'; Moretto 22'; Iossa 37'

Umpires:
Khidash Kiyani Mohammad (NOR)
Maksym Perepelytsya (UKR)

11 January 2026
11:30

Ukraine	8–2	Greece
Shevchuk 16', 21', 24', 34', 35'; Onofriiuk 17'; Kaplinskyi 19', 36'	Report	Diringer 15'; Dierckx 38'

Umpires:
Jesus Medinilla (ESP)
Alessio Fiorenza (ITA)

11 January 2026
13:00

Norway	2–4	Sweden
Ab. Singh 3'; Helgetveit 30'	Report	Karlsson 7'; Rodewi 25', 30'; Rydin 29'

Umpires:
Elysee Enness-Laporte (GRE)
Karolis Donculas (LTU)

== See also ==
- 2026 Men's EuroHockey Indoor Championship
- 2026 Women's EuroHockey Indoor Championship
- 2026 Women's EuroHockey Indoor Championship II
