= 2015 Women's EuroHockey Championship III =

Sixth edition of the Women's EuroHockey Championship III

Tournament details
- Host country: Croatia
- City: Sveti Ivan Zelina
- Dates: 20–25 July
- Teams: 5 (from 1 confederation)
- Venue: HK Zelina

Final positions
- Champions: Russia (1st title)
- Runner-up: Lithuania
- Third place: Turkey

Tournament statistics
- Matches played: 10
- Goals scored: 56 (5.6 per match)
- Top scorer(s): (Russia) Marina Fedorova (Russia) Tamara Ivanova (Russia) Ksenia Shamina (4 goals)

The 2015 Women's EuroHockey Championship III was the 6th edition of the Women's EuroHockey Championship III, a field hockey championship for women. It was held from the 20 to 25 August 2015 in Sveti Ivan Zelina, Croatia. The winner of this tournament was promoted to the 2017 Women's EuroHockey Championship II

== Qualified teams ==
- Croatia
- Lithuania
- Russia
- Switzerland
- Turkey

== Format ==
The five teams will be placed in a single pool. Each team will play the other four teams once. The final results from those games will also be the final standings.

== Results ==
All times are local (UTC+2).

=== Standings ===
Pos	Team	Pld	W	D	L	GF	GA	GD	Pts	Promotion
1	Russia	4	4	0	0	29	2	+27	12	EuroHockey Championship II
2	Lithuania	4	2	1	1	10	14	−4	7	
3	Turkey	4	2	0	2	8	8	0	6	
4	Croatia (H)	4	1	0	3	4	20	−16	3	
5	Switzerland	4	0	1	3	5	12	−7	1	

Source: FIH
Rules for classification: 1) points; 2) goal difference; 3) goals scored; 4) head-to-head result.
(H) Hosts

=== Matches ===
20 July 2015
16:00

Switzerland	1–2	Turkey
Triebold 57'	Report	Öztürk 33'; Çinar 61'

Umpires:
Li Min Toh (SGP)
Kamile Mockaityte (LTU)

20 July 2015
18:15

Lithuania	5–1	Croatia
Petrauskaite 9'; Juodyte 20', 28'; Juraite 44'; Zalandauskaite 67'	Report	Peranic 7'

Umpires:
Corinne Strebel (SUI)
Nicole Wajer (NED)

21 July 2015
16:00

Lithuania	2–1	Turkey
Poskute 16'; Aucynaite 64'	Report	Çinar 49'

Umpires:
Nicole Wajer (NED)
Natalia Kovalena (RUS)

21 July 2015
18:15

Russia	9–0	Croatia
Vasileva 18'; Shamina 21', 56'; Ivanova 23'; Svezhentseva 28'; Drepenkina 32'; Imranova 51'; Fedorova 63', 66'	Report

Umpires:
Seyma Sozer (TUR)
Li Min Toh (SGP)

22 July 2015
16:00

Switzerland	1–5	Russia
Stühlinger 43'	Report	Ivanova 16'; Shamina 23'; Petrova 32'; Fedorova 39'; Anvarova 63'

Umpires:
Li Min Toh (SGP)
Nicole Wajer (NED)

22 July 2015
18:15

Turkey	5–0	Croatia
Oymak 26'; Gültekin 49', 69'; Bahçivan 58'; Güzelal 60'	Report

Umpires:
Corinne Strebel (SUI)
Natalia Kovaleva (RUS)

24 July 2015
15:00

Switzerland	2–2	Lithuania
Berlie 8'; Haussener 50'	Report	Poskute 2'; Juodyte 60'

Umpires:
Seyma Sozer (TUR)
Natalia Kovaleva (RUS)

24 July 2015
17:15

Russia	5–0	Turkey
Svezhentseva 18'; Imranova 37'; Guteneva 48'; Anvarova 55'; Shamina 65'	Report

Umpires:
Corinne Strebel (SUI)
Kamile Mockaityte (LTU)

25 July 2015
11:00

Lithuania	1–10	Russia
Petrauskaite 30'	Report	Miroshnikova 8'; Vasileva 15'; Ivanova 22', 58'; Anvarova 66'; Shumilina 42', 47'; Svezhentseva 47'; Fedorova 53'; Guteneva 70+'

Umpires:
Li Min Tho (SGP)
Nicole Wajer (NED)

25 July 2015
15:15

Croatia	3–1	Switzerland
Šomin 13', 27'; Abramovic 23'	Report	Haussener 3'

Umpires:
Seyma Sozer (TUR)
Kamile Mockaityte (LTU)

== See also ==
- 2015 Men's EuroHockey Championship III
- 2015 Women's EuroHockey Championship II
