= 2020 Women's EuroHockey Indoor Championship II =

Tournament details
- Host country: Croatia
- City: Sveti Ivan Zelina
- Dates: 24–26 January
- Teams: 7 (from 1 confederation)
- Venue: Sportska dvorana

Final positions
- Champions: Russia (3rd title)
- Runner-up: Turkey
- Third place: Scotland

Tournament statistics
- Matches played: 21
- Goals scored: 186 (8.86 per match)
- Top scorer: (Russia) Svetlana Eroshina (30 goals)

The 2020 Women's EuroHockey Indoor Championship II was the thirteenth edition of the Women's EuroHockey Indoor Championship II, the second level of the women's European indoor hockey championships organized by the European Hockey Federation. It took place from 24 to 26 January 2020 at the Sportska dvorana in Sveti Ivan Zelina, Croatia.

Russia won their third Women's EuroHockey Indoor Championship II title by finishing top of the round-robin pool and were promoted to the Women's EuroHockey Indoor Championship in 2022 together with Turkey, Scotland and Poland.

== Standing ==
Pos	Team	Pld	W	D	L	GF	GA	GD	Pts	Promotion
1	Russia (P)	6	6	0	0	71	17	+54	18	EuroHockey Indoor Championship
2	Turkey (P)	6	4	0	2	28	23	+5	12	EuroHockey Indoor Championship
3	Scotland (P)	6	4	0	2	25	27	−2	12	EuroHockey Indoor Championship
4	Poland (P)	6	3	0	3	24	16	+8	9	EuroHockey Indoor Championship
5	Lithuania	6	3	0	3	23	23	0	9	
6	Croatia (H)	6	1	0	5	11	24	−13	3	
7	Wales	6	0	0	6	4	56	−52	0	

Source: FIH
Rules for classification: 1) points; 2) matches won; 3) goal difference; 4) goals for; 5) head-to-head result; 6) field goals scored.
(H) Hosts; (P) Promoted

== Results ==
24 January 2020
11:00

Wales	0–6	Poland
	Report	Polewczak 3'; Slawinska 14', 35'; Katerla 15'; Suszynska 20'; Zagajska 36'

24 January 2020
12:15

Turkey	3–4	Lithuania
Küçükkoç 3'; Oymak 13'; Esen 31'	Report	Jakovleva 4'; Kartanović 8'; Bartkuvienè 18'; Grigiene 39'

24 January 2020
13:30

Scotland
Dark 6'
Eadie 18'
Ward 24'
Ross 36'
Jamieson 39'
5–3
Report
Croatia
Llitvić U. 16', 30'

Makar 27'

24 January 2020
15:00

Wales

0–22
Report
Russia
Sadovaia 2', 14', 22', 31'
Eroshina 12', 15', 16', 17', 21', 22', 26', 39'

Sartakova 13', 19', 37'
Khalimova 21', 26', 30', 32', 40'
Makeeva 23'
Goryacheva 40'

24 January 2020
17:00

Turkey	4–3	Poland
Gültekin 5', 36'; Küçükkoç 6', 33'	Report	Katerla 2'; Polewczak 36'; Zagajska 40'

24 January 2020
18:15

Scotland	6–3	Lithuania
Dark 7', 26', 34', 35'; Mack 17'; Jamieson 24'	Report	Kartanović 6'; Grigiene 22'; Kukliene 27'

24 January 2020
19:30

Russia	8–2	Croatia
Eroshina 3', 32', 36'; Sartakova 3'; Sadovaia 12', 14', 25'; Khalimova 12'	Report	Vajdić 20'; Llitvić U. 23'

25 January 2020
10:00

Turkey	1–14	Russia
Küçükkoç 7'	Report	Sadovaia 4', 11', 12', 31'; Eroshina 4', 17', 28', 32'; Makeeva 6', 26', 35'; Sartakova 34', 36'; Anisimova 38'

25 January 2020
11:15

Wales	0–6	Lithuania
	Report	Kartanović 2', 24'; Grigiene 1'; Jakovleva; 5', 13', 35'

25 January 2020
12:30

Poland
Katerla 27'

Zagajska 36', 40'

3–4
Report
Scotland
Mack 8'
Jamieson 23'
Dark 35'
Ross 37'

25 January 2020
14:00

Croatia	1–4	Turkey
Makar 34'}	Report	Çelik 13'; Gültekin 16'; Küçükkoç 20', 39'

25 January 2020
16:00

Lithuania	5–9	Russia
Jakovleva 10', 15', 32'; Kukliene 14'; Grigiene 20'	Report	Eroshina 1', 17', 19', 19', 28'; Makeeva 8', 29'; Khalimova 12', 30'

25 January 2020
17:15

Scotland	4–3	Wales
Blaikie 1'; Jamieson 2', 18'; Eadie 1'	Report	Beddow 8', 13'; Hoskins 38'

25 January 2020
18:30

Poland	3–0	Croatia
Katerla 12'; Slawinska 31'; Zagajska 40'	Report

26 January 2020
08:15

Scotland
Jamieson 25'
1–3
Report
Turkey
Alpakan 30'
Küçükkoç 35'

Çelik 37'

26 January 2020
09:30

Croatia	5–1	Wales
Makar 3', 6'; Litvić E. 14'; Lagančić 17'; Vajdić 39'	Report	Beddow 32'

26 January 2020
10:45

Poland	5–2	Lithuania
Katerla 8', 12', 27'; Slawinska 20'; Zagajska 39'	Report	Jakovleva 22', 29'

26 January 2020
12:15

Scotland	5–12	Russia
Eadie 2'; Blaikie 9', 28'; Howie 32'; Dark 35'	Report	Sadovaia 6', 16'; Eroshina 8', 8', 10', 18', 26', 30', 31'; Khalimova] 13'; Makeeva 17'; Sartakova 28'

26 January 2020
13:30

Wales	0–13	Turkey
	Report	Küçükkoç 2', 5', 13', 17', 23', 24', 40'; Esen 7', 22', 39'; Çelik 9'; Gültekin 15'; Oymak 35'

26 January 2020
14:45

Lithuania	3–0	Croatia
Jakovleva 13', 23'; Grigiene 25'	Report

26 January 2020
16:00

Poland	4–6	Russia
Zagajska 3'; Polewczak 17'; Slawinska 23', 33'	Report	Eroshina 13', 23', 39'; Sadovaia 20'; Khalimova 21'; Sartakova 26'

== See also ==
- 2020 Men's EuroHockey Indoor Championship II
- 2020 Women's EuroHockey Indoor Championship
