= 2022 Women's EuroHockey Junior Championship III =

European women's hockey championship

Tournament details
- Host country: Turkey
- City: Alanya
- Dates: 27–30 July
- Teams: 3 (from 1 confederation)

Final positions
- Champions: Turkey (1st title)
- Runner-up: Lithuania
- Third place: Switzerland

Tournament statistics
- Matches played: 4
- Goals scored: 21 (5.25 per match)
- Top scorer: (Turkey) Sudenur Kurt (3 goals)

The 2022 Women's EuroHockey Junior Championship III was the seventh edition of the Women's EuroHockey Junior Championship III, the third level of the women's European under-21 field hockey championship organized by the European Hockey Federation. It was held in Alanya, Turkey from 26 to 30 July 2022.

The hosts Turkey won their first Women's EuroHockey Junior Championship III title by defeating Lithuania 2–0 in the final and were promoted to the EuroHockey Junior Championship II in 2024.

== Preliminary round ==
=== Pool A ===
Pos	Team	Pld	W	D	L	GF	GA	GD	Pts	Qualification
1	Turkey (H)	2	2	0	0	10	5	+5	6	Final
2	Lithuania	2	1	0	1	4	5	−1	3	Final
3	Switzerland	2	0	0	2	5	9	−4	0	

Source: FIH
Rules for classification: 1) points; 2) matches won; 3) goal difference; 4) goals for; 5) head-to-head result; 6) field goals for.
(H) Hosts

27 July 2022
10:00

Turkey	4–1	Lithuania
	Report

28 July 2022
10:00

Switzerland	4–6	Turkey
	Report

29 July 2022
10:00

Lithuania	3–1	Switzerland
	Report

== Final ==
30 July 2022
10:00

Turkey	2–0	Lithuania
	Report

== Final standings ==
Pos	Team	Promotion
1	Turkey (H)	EuroHockey Junior Championship II
2	Lithuania	
3	Switzerland	

Source: FIH
(H) Host

== See also ==
- 2022 Men's EuroHockey Junior Championship III
- 2022 Women's EuroHockey Junior Championship II
