= Turkish Hockey Federation =

Governing body of field hockey in Turkey

Turkish Hockey Federation Türkiye Hokey Federasyon
- Sport: Hockey
- Abbreviation: THF
- Founded: 6 February 2002; 24 years ago
- Affiliation: International Hockey Federation (FIH)
- Regional affiliation: European Hockey Federation (EHF)
- Location: Yenişehir, Ankara
- Chairman: Mustafa Çakır (2024–)

Official website
- www.turkhokey.gov.tr
- (Turkey)

Turkish Hockey Federation (Turkish: Türkiye Hokey Federasyonu, THF) is the governing body of the field hockey and indoor field hockey sports in Turkey. It was established on 6 February 2002. It is a member of the International Hockey Federation (FIH) since 5 December 2002. The THF is based in Ankara, and it has been chaired by Mustafa Çakır since 1 November 2024.

== History ==
The Turkish Hockey Federation, initially named "Turkish Grass Hockey Federation" (Turkish: Türkiye Çim Hokeyi Federasyonu), was established on 6 February 2002. Administrative and financial autonomy was granted to the Federation on 5 April 2006 with approval of the Minister of State and Deputy Prime Minister . Federation's first and founding chairman was Ali Aytemiz, a businessman in oil trade, who served until 23 July 2003.

Current chairman of the federation is Sadık Karakan, in office since 23 October 2016.

== Domestic competitions ==
The federation organizes tournaments and leagues for both gender in the U10, U12, U14, U16, U18, U21 and senior categories.

Men's Indoor hockey

- Turkish Men's Indoor Hockey Super League,
- Turkish Men's Indoor Hockey First League,
- Turkish Men's Indoor Hockey Second League
- U18 Boys' Indoor Hockey Turkish Championships
- U16 Boys' Indoor Hockey Turkish Championships,

Men's Field hockey

- Turkish Men's Field Hockey Super League,
- Turkish Men's Field Hockey First League,
- Turkish Men's Field Hockey Second League
- U18 Boys' Field Hockey Turkish Championships (18 teams)
- U16 Boys' Hockey5s First League
- U16 Boys' Hockey5s Second League

Women's Indoor hockey

- Turkish Women's Indoor Hockey Super League,
- Turkish Women's Indoor Hockey First League,
- U18 Girls' Indoor Hockey Turkish Championships
- U16 Girls' Indoor Hockey Turkish Championships (8 teams)

Women's Field hockey

- Turkish Women's Field Hockey Super League
- Turkish Women's Field Hockey First League,
- U18 Girls' Field HockeyTurkish Championships (16 teams)
- U16 Girls' Hockey5s First League
- U16 Girls' Hockey5s Second League

== International participation ==
Turkey national teams of men and women participate in EuroHockey competitions in the U18 (youth), U21 (junior) and senior categories.

Men

- Eurohockey Men's Indoor Club Challenge I
- Eurohockey Men's Indoor Junior Championship II
- Eurohockey Men’s Club Champions Challenge III
- Eurohockey Boy's Youth Championship II
- Eurohockey Men's Championship III

Women

- Eurohockey Women's Indoor Club Challenge I
- Eurohockey Women's Indoor Junior Championship II
- Eurohockey Women’s Club Champions Challenge III
- Eurohockey Girls' Youth Championship III
- Eurohockey Women's Championship III

== See also ==
- Turkey men's national field hockey team
- Turkey women's national field hockey team
- Turkey women's national indoor hockey team
