= Gaziantep Doruk SK =

Indoor hockey club

- League: Turkish Women's Indoor Hockey Super League
- Founded: 1 February 2013; 13 years ago

Personnel
- President: Esengül Kınacılar

Gaziantep Doruk Spor Kulübü is a Turkish women's indoor hockey club based in Gaziantep, southeastern Turkey. It was established on 1 February 2013. Club cpresident is Esengül Kınacılar. They play in the Turkish Women's Indoor Hockey Super League.

== History ==
The team finished the 2018–19 Indoor Hockey Super League season as runner-up. They became champion in the 2024–25 Indoor Hockey Super League season. They played at the 2026 Women's EuroHockey Indoor Club Trophy in Lambersart, France.

== League standings ==
League	Season	Rank	Ref.
Indoor Super	2018–19	2nd place, silver medalist(s)	
Indoor Super	2019–20	3rd place, bronze medalist(s)	
Indoor Super	2020–21	3rd place, bronze medalist(s)	
Indoor Super	2021–22	1st place, gold medalist(s)	
Indoor Super	2022–23	3rd place, bronze medalist(s)	
Indoor Super	2023–24	5th	
Indoor Super	2024–25	1st place, gold medalist(s)	
Indoor Super	2025–26	4th	

== Current squad ==
As of 2025–26.

Head coach: (Turkey) Vural Gökhan Karaoğlan

No.	Pos.	Nation	Player
1		TUR	Nurhan Gül
3		TUR	Gülistan Erdin
5		TUR	İlayda Akbulut
7		TUR	Aysun Epenginl
8		TUR	Rukiye Mercan
9		TUR	Hiranur Baran

No.	Pos.	Nation	Player
10		TUR	Nur Nebi Baranl
11		TUR	Emine Naz Elbay
12		TUR	Berfin Epergin
16		TUR	Emine Buse Şahin
17		TUR	Yeter Okumuş
18		TUR	Emine Çelik

== International participations ==
As of April 2026.

=== Indoor hockey ===
Year	Host	Competition	Result
2026	FRA, Lambersart	EuroHockey Indoor Club Trophy	8th

=== Field hockey ===
Year	Host	Competition	Result
2023	AUT, Vienna	EuroHockey Club Challenge II	7th

== Achievements ==
Turkish Women's Indoor Hockey Super League

- (gold) (2): 2021–22, 2024–25.
- (silver) (1): 2018–19.
- (bronze) (3): 2019–20, 2020–21, 2022–23.
