= Turkish Women's Indoor Hockey Super League =

- Current season or competition: 2025–26
- Countries: Turkey
- Federation: EuroHockey
- Recent champions: Gaziantep Polisgücü
- Most successful club: Gaziantep Polisgücü

The Turkish Women's Indoor Hockey Super League (Turkish: Kadınlar Salon Hokey Süper Lig) is the top level women's indoor hockey league of Turkey. In the 2025–26 season, eight teams played a double round robin to decide a champion club, which qualifies for a spot in the appropriate level of Women's EuroHockey Indoor Championship and Women's EuroHockey Indoor Club Cup according to the club's ranking.

== Clubs ==
Season 2025–26.
Team	Hometown	Founde	Ref.
Alanya Yıldızları	Antalya	1991	
Ege Yıldızları	Muğla	2009	
Gaziantep Doruk	Gaziantep	2013	
Gaziantep Polisgücü	Gaziantep	1988	
Kozlu	Zonguldak	2014	
Muğla Köyceğiz Göl	Muğla	2015	
YFO Haydarpaşa	Istanbul	2007	
Zonguldak	Zonguldak	2019	

== Past winners ==
Season	Champions	Runners-up	Third Place	Ref.
2018–19	Gaziantep Polisgücü	Gaziantep Doruk	Bolu	,
2019–20	Gaziantep Polisgücü	Alanya Yıldızları	Gaziantep Doruk	
2020–21	Gaziantep Polisgücü	Alanya Yıldızları	Gaziantep Doruk	
2021–22	Gaziantep Doruk	Gaziantep Polisgücü	Alanya Yıldızları	
2022–23	Gaziantep Polisgücü	Alanya Yıldızları	Gaziantep Doruk	
2023–24	Ege Yıldızları	Gaziantep Polisgücü	Kırıkkale	
2024–25	Gaziantep Doruk	Gaziantep Polisgücü	Ege Yıldızları	
2025–26	Gaziantep Polisgücü	Alanya Yıldızları	YFO Haydarpaşa	

Summary

Team	Champions	Runners-up	Third Place
Gaziantep Polisgücü	5	3	0
Gaziantep Doruk	2	1	3
Ege Yıldızları	1	0	1
Alanya Yıldızları	0	4	1
Bolu	0	0	1
Kırıkkale	0	0	1
YFO Haydarpaşa	0	0	1
Total	8	8	8

== Top goalscorers ==
Season	Player	Club	Goals	Ref.
2018–19	Leyla Öztürk	Gaziantep Polisgücü	35	
2019–20	Fatma Songül Gültekin	Gaziantep Polisgücü	88	
2020–21	Fatma Songül Gültekin	Gaziantep Polisgücü	43	
2021–22	Ece Şahiner	Kırıkkale	115	
2022–23	Fatma Songül Gültekin	Gaziantep Polisgücü	73	
2023–24	Fatma Songül Gültekin	Gaziantep Polisgücü	77	
2024–25	Fatma Songül Gültekin	Gaziantep Polisgücü	30	
2025–26	Fatma Songül Gültekin	Gaziantep Polisgücü	51	

Summary

Player	Times
Fatma Songül Gültekin	6
Leyla Öztürk	1
Ece Şahiner	1
Total	8
