= 2025 Women's EuroHockey Indoor Club Cup =

Indoor hockey tournament in Šiauliai, Lithuania

Tournament details
- Host country: Lithuania
- City: Šiauliai
- Dates: 14–16 February
- Teams: 8 (from 8 associations)
- Venue: Šiauliai Sport Gymnasium Hall

Final positions
- Champions: (Ukraine) Sumchanka (1st title)
- Runner-up: (Netherlands) SCHC
- Third place: (Spain) Complutense

Tournament statistics
- Matches played: 20
- Goals scored: 123 (6.15 per match)
- Top scorer: Leonova Karyna (Sumchanka) (10 goals)
- Best player: Sonja Zimmermann (Mannheimer HC)
- Best goalkeeper: Lidia Paniagua (Complutense)

The 2025 Women's EuroHockey Indoor Club Cup was the 33rd edition of the Women's EuroHockey Indoor Club Cup, Europe's premier indoor hockey club tournament for women organized by the European Hockey Federation. It was hosted by Šiauliai Ginstrektė-Akademija at the Šiauliai Sport Gymnasium Hall in Šiauliai, Lithuania from 14 to 16 February 2025.

Sumchanka won their first title and became the first Ukrainian club to win the tournament by defeating SCHC 2–0 in a shoot-out after the final finished 2–2. Complutense won the bronze medal by defeating Mannheimer HC 3–2 in a shoot-out after the match finished 3–3. For the first time in this competition a German club did not win a medal. Ege Yıldızları and the hosts Ginstrektė-Akademija finished in seventh and eighth place respectively, which means Turkey and Lithuania were relegated to the Club Trophy in 2026.

== Teams ==
The tournament returned to its original format with eight teams. Switzerland, England, Scotland and Ireland were relegated and were replaced by the Netherlands and Lithuania who were promoted from the 2024 EuroHockey Indoor Club Trophy.

- (Spain) Complutense
- (Turkey) Ege Yıldızları SK
- (Belgium) Waterloo Ducks
- (Germany) Mannheimer HC
- (Czech Republic) Slavia Prague
- (Ukraine) Sumchanka
- (Lithuania) Ginstrektė-Akademija
- (Netherlands) SCHC

== Preliminary round ==
=== Pool A ===
Pos	Team	Pld	W	D	L	GF	GA	GD	Pts	Qualification
1	(Germany) Mannheimer HC	3	3	0	0	13	3	+10	15	Semi-finals
2	(Spain) Complutense	3	2	0	1	11	7	+4	11	Semi-finals
3	(Belgium) Waterloo Ducks	3	1	0	2	11	9	+2	6	
4	(Lithuania) Ginstrektė-Akademija (H)	3	0	0	3	4	20	−16	0	

Source: EHF
Rules for classification: 1) Points; 2) matches won; 3) goal difference; 4) goals for; 5) head-to-head result; 6) field goals for.
(H) Hosts

14 February 2025
12:40

Mannheimer HC (Germany)	4–2	(Spain) Complutense
G. Schubert 4'; Zimmermann 12', 37', 40'	Report	De la Llama 14', 36'

Umpires:
Alex Fedenczuk (SCO)
Una Mihajlović (CRO)

14 February 2025
12:40

Waterloo Ducks (Belgium)	9–2	(Lithuania) Ginstrektė-Akademija
Ronquetti 2', 14', 26', 32', 34'; Wagemans 12'; Gose-Claessens 15'; Peeters 36'; De Greve 40'	Report	Kuklienė 8'; Gudeliauskytė 19'

Umpires:
Kevin Roberts (WAL)
Lorijn de Kraker (NED)

14 February 2025
18:40

Waterloo Ducks (Belgium)	1–3	(Germany) Mannheimer HC
Ronquetti 36'	Report	Matthysen 14'; Zimmermann 22', 39'

Umpires:
Gemma Jones (ENG)
Isaac Charles (ENG)

14 February 2025
20:00

Complutense (Spain)	5–2	(Lithuania) Ginstrektė-Akademija
Condes 2'; Riera 12', 13'; De la Llama 17'; Melero 30'	Report	Juraitė 3'; Grigienė 24'

Umpires:
Ole Ingerwesen (GER)
Magali Sergeant (BEL)

15 February 2025
11:40

Complutense (Spain)	4–1	(Belgium) Waterloo Ducks
Carmona 3'; Melero 10'; De la Llama 14'; Jakus 16'	Report	Peeters 40'

Umpires:
Gemma Jones (ENG)
Alex Fedenczuk (SCO)

15 February 2025
13:00

Mannheimer HC (Germany)	6–0	(Lithuania) Ginstrektė-Akademija
Zimmermann 2', 6', 27'; Seidel 15'; G. Schubert 20', 38'	Report

Umpires:
Una Mihajlović (CRO)
Isaac Charles (ENG)

=== Pool B ===
Pos	Team	Pld	W	D	L	GF	GA	GD	Pts	Qualification
1	(Netherlands) SCHC	3	2	1	0	15	4	+11	12	Semi-finals
2	(Ukraine) Sumchanka	3	2	0	1	15	8	+7	11	Semi-finals
3	(Turkey) Ege Yıldızları SK	3	1	0	2	6	21	−15	5	
4	(Czech Republic) Slavia Prague	3	0	1	2	8	11	−3	4	

Source: EHF
Rules for classification: 1) Points; 2) matches won; 3) goal difference; 4) goals for; 5) head-to-head result; 6) field goals for.

14 February 2025
10:00

(Turkey) Ege Yıldızları	4–2	(Czech Republic) Slavia Prague
Erkoç 9'; Çelebi 21'; İdik 26'; Kurt 34'	Report	Horešovská 7'; Babická 40'

Umpires:
Ole Ingwersen (GER)
Gemma Jones (ENG)

14 February 2025
11:20

Sumchanka (Ukraine)	1–3	(Netherlands) SCHC
Movchan 13'	Report	Zandee 6', 15'; Van den Heuvel 14'

Umpires:
Isaac Charles (ENG)
Magali Sergeant (BEL)

14 February 2025
16:00

Slavia Prague (Czech Republic)	3–3	(Netherlands) SCHC
Babická 14', 23'; Hájková 40'	Report	Zandee 2'; Van den Heuvel 7', 18'

Umpires:
Abby MacArthur (WAL)
Alex Fedenczuk (SCO)

14 February 2025
17:20

Sumchanka (Ukraine)	10–2	(Turkey) Ege Yıldızlar
Shokalenko 10'; Popova 15'; Leonova 18', 19', 19', 25', 27', 39'; Basanets 22'; Tanchenko 29'	Report	Kurt 6'; Başbuğ 16'

Umpires:
Una Mihajlović (CRO)
Kevin Roberts (WAL)

15 February 2025
09:00

(Turkey) Ege Yıldızlar	0–9	(Netherlands) SCHC
	Report	Van den Heuvel 14', 23', 30', 36'; Boot 18'; De Geus 26'; Smorenberg 27'; Knoop 29'; Koomen 34'

Umpires:
Abby MacArthur (WAL)
Ole Ingwersen (GER)

15 February 2025
10:20

Slavia Prague (Czech Republic)	3–4	(Ukraine) Sumchanka
Hájková 18', 28', 31'	Report	Leonova 4', 27', 34'; Shyshyna 29'

Umpires:
Lorijn de Kraker (NED)
Magali Sergeant (BEL)

== Fifth to eighth place classification ==
The points obtained in the preliminary round against the other team were carried over.

=== Pool C ===
Pos	Team	Pld	W	D	L	GF	GA	GD	Pts	Relegation
1	(Belgium) Waterloo Ducks	3	3	0	0	19	6	+13	15	
2	(Czech Republic) Slavia Prague	3	1	0	2	12	10	+2	7	
3	(Turkey) Ege Yıldızları (R)	3	1	0	2	6	11	−5	6	EuroHockey Indoor Club Trophy
4	(Lithuania) Ginstrektė-Akademija (H, R)	3	1	0	2	7	17	−10	5	EuroHockey Indoor Club Trophy

Source: EHF
Rules for classification: 1) Points; 2) matches won; 3) goal difference; 4) goals for; 5) head-to-head result; 6) field goals for.
(H) Hosts; (R) Relegated

15 February 2025
16:30

Waterloo Ducks (Belgium)	5–0	(Turkey) Ege Yıldızları
	Report

15 February 2025
17:50

Ginstrektė-Akademija (Lithuania)	1–6	(Czech Republic) Slavia Prague
	Report

16 February 2025
09:40

Waterloo Ducks (Belgium)	5–4	(Czech Republic) Slavia Prague
	Report

16 February 2025
11:00

Ege Yıldızları (Turkey)	2–4	(Lithuania) Ginstrektė-Akademija
	Report

== First to fourth place classification ==
=== Bracket ===
Semi-finals
15 February
(Germany) Mannheimer HC	0
(Ukraine) Sumchanka	3
15 February
(Netherlands) SCHC (s.o.)	0 (1)
(Spain) Complutense	0 (0)

Final
16 February
(Ukraine) Sumchanka (s.o.)	2 (2)
(Netherlands) SCHC	2 (0)
Third place
16 February
(Germany) Mannheimer HC	3 (2)
(Spain) Complutense (s.o.)	3 (3)

=== Semi-finals ===
15 February 2025
19:15

Mannheimer HC (Germany)	0–3	(Ukraine) Sumchanka
	Report

15 February 2025
20:45

SCHC (Netherlands)	0–0	(Spain) Complutense
	Report
Penalties
Van den Heuvel (penalty shoot-out missed); Zandee (penalty shoot-out missed); De Geus (penalty shoot-out scored)	1–0	(penalty shoot-out missed) Carmona; (penalty shoot-out missed) Condes; (penalty shoot-out missed) De la Llama

Umpires:
Ole Ingerwesen (GER)
Isaac Charles (ENG)

=== Third and fourth place ===
16 February 2025
12:30

Mannheimer HC (Germany)	3–3	(Spain) Complutense
	Report
Penalties
	2–3

=== Final ===
16 February 2025
14:00

Sumchanka (Ukraine)	2–2	(Netherlands) SCHC
	Report
Penalties
	2–0

== Statistics ==
=== Final standings ===
Pos	Team	Relegation
1st place, gold medalist(s)	(Ukraine) Sumchanka	
2nd place, silver medalist(s)	(Netherlands) SCHC	
3rd place, bronze medalist(s)	(Spain) Complutense	
4	(Germany) Mannheimer HC	
5	(Belgium) Waterloo Ducks	
6	(Czech Republic) Slavia Prague	
7	(Turkey) Ege Yıldızları (R)	EuroHockey Indoor Club Trophy
8	(Lithuania) Ginstrektė-Akademija (H, R)	EuroHockey Indoor Club Trophy

Source: EHF
(H) Host; (R) Relegated

=== Top goalscorers ===
Rank	Player	Team	FG	PC	PS	Goals
1	(Ukraine) Karyna Leonova	(Ukraine) Sumchanka	9	1	0	10
2	(Belgium) Marie Ronquetti	(Belgium) Waterloo Ducks	1	7	1	9
2	(Czech Republic) Natálie Hájková	(Czech Republic) Slavia Prague	1	4	4	9
4	(Netherlands) Maud van den Heuvel	(Netherlands) SCHC	8	0	0	8
4	(Germany) Sonja Zimmermann	(Germany) Mannheimer HC	0	7	1	8
6	(Czech Republic) Nikol Babická	(Czech Republic) Slavia Prague	5	0	0	5
6	(Spain) Alejandra de la Llama	(Spain) Complutense	3	2	0	5
8	(Ukraine) Kateryna Popova	(Ukraine) Sumchanka	1	3	0	4
9	Six players					3

== See also ==
- 2025 Men's EuroHockey Indoor Club Cup
- 2025 Women's Euro Hockey League
