= Turkey women's national indoor hockey team =

Women's indoor hockey team

Turkey
- Association: Turkish Hockey Federation
- Confederation: EHF (Europe)

FIH ranking
- Current: 34 ▲1 (11 June 2026)

The Turkey women's national indoor hockey team is organized by the Turkish Hockey Federation and represents Turkey in international women's indoor hockey competitions.

== Competitive record ==
=== EuroHockey Indoor Championship ===
EuroHockey Championship									style=width:1 rowspan=2
Year	Rank	M	W	D	L	GF	GA	GD	Link
(Germany) 2022	6th	6	0	0	6	14	34	−20	Link
(Germany) 2024	9th	5	1	0	4	20	32	-12	Link
2028									
Total		11	1	0	10	34	66	-32	Link

=== EuroHockey Indoor Championship II ===
EuroHockey Championship II									style=width:1 rowspan=2
Year	Rank	M	W	D	L	GF	GA	GD	Link
(Croatia) 2020	2nd place, silver medalist(s)	6	4	0	2	28	23	+5	Link
(Portugal) 2026	1st place, gold medalist(s)	6	5	1	0	67	17	+50	Link
Total		12	9	1	2	95	40	+55	Link

=== Competitions by year ===
As of April 2026.

Year	Host	Competition	Result
2008	ENG, Sheffield	EuroHockey Indoor Nations Challenge	3rd place, bronze medalist(s)
2012	POR, Gondomar	EuroHockey Indoor Championship III	6th
2014	CRO, Poreč	EuroHockey Indoor Championship III	2nd place, silver medalist(s)
2018	SLO, Apače	EuroHockey Indoor Championship III	1st place, gold medalist(s)
2022	GER, Hamburg	EuroHockey Indoor Championship	6th
2024	GER, Berlin	EuroHockey Indoor Championship	9th

== Current squad ==
As of 10 December 2023.

Head coach: (Turkey) Yasin Yükseler

No.	Pos.	Player	Date of birth (age)	Caps	Goals	Club
1	GK	Serpil Öztürk	19 October 2011 (age 14)	2	0	(Turkey) Bolu GSİM
2		Kübra Güzelal	17 March 1993 (age 33)	23	1	(Turkey) Alanya Yıldızları Hockey
3		Merve Aslan	15 April 2002 (age 24)	23	5	(Turkey) Dokuz Eylül University
4		Zeliha Kendir	4 October 2001 (age 24)	23	5	(Turkey) Ege Yıldızları
7		Meryem Oymak	12 August 1998 (age 27)	41	11	(Turkey) Gaziantep Polisgücü
8		Sinem Yalçın	3 November 1994 (age 31)	26	1	(Turkey) Gaziantep Polisgücü
9	FW	Fatma Songül Gültekin	5 November 1997 (age 28)	24	31	(Turkey) Gaziantep Polisgücü
10	FW	Perihan Çınar (C)	17 January 1994 (age 32)	27	42	(Turkey) Gaziantep Polisgücü
11		Yeter Çelik	16 July 2000 (age 25)	43	8	(Turkey) Gaziantep Polisgücü
15		Emine Bahcivan	22 February 1996 (age 30)	26	3	(Turkey) Alanya Yıldızları Hockey
19		Tuğçe Şahiner	January 1, 2001 (age 25)	30	1	(Turkey) Kırıkkale
22	GK	Selin Güzeller	1 June 1993 (age 33)	18	0	(Turkey) Alanya Yıldızları Hockey

== Former squads ==
; 2020 Women's EuroHockey Indoor Championship II Runners-up

- 2 Kübra Güzelal, 5 Yeter Çelik, 7 Meryem Oymak 8 Sinem Alpakan, 9 Ayla Esen, 10 Perihan Küçükkoç (C), 11 Fatma Songül Gültekin, 15 Emine Bahçıvan, 17 Serpil Türker, 19 Elif Cengiz, 22 Selin Güzeller (GK), 27 Ece Şahiner - Coach: (Iran) Rajab Nourani.

2026 Women's EuroHockey Indoor Championship II Champions

- 1 Arzu Öztürk (GK), 2 Aleyna Başbuğ, 4 Zeliha Kendir, 7 Yeter Okumuş, 8 Nur Baran, 9 Tuğçe Şahiner, 10 Fatma Songül Gültekin, 11 Ece Şahiner, 12 Evin Yağşı (GK), 13 Gülcan Paksoy, 15 Nurhan Gül, 20 Esma İdik - Coach: (Turkey) Zeyni Efe Bozkurt.

== See also ==
- Turkey women's national field hockey team
