= Emily Dark =

Scottish field hockey player

Personal information
- Born: 8 August 2000 (age 25) Scotland

Sport
- Sport: Field hockey
- Position: Defender
- Club: Watsonians Hockey Club
National team
Years	Team	Caps	Goals
2017–	Scotland	23	(2)
2020-	Great Britain	0	(0)
Medal record
Women's field hockey
Representing Scotland

Emily Dark (born 8 August 2000) is a Scottish international field hockey player who plays as a defender for Scotland and Great Britain.

She plays club hockey in Scotland for Watsonians Hockey Club.

Dark made her senior international debut for Scotland v Ireland on 22 October 2017, aged 17.

She represented Scotland at the 2019 Women's EuroHockey Championship II.
