= Women's EuroHockey Indoor Championship II =

- Most recent season or competition: 2026 Women's EuroHockey Indoor Championship II
- Formerly: Women's EuroHockey Indoor Nations Trophy
- Sport: Indoor hockey
- Founded: 1996; 30 years ago
- No. of teams: 8
- Confederation: EHF (Europe)
- Most recent champion: Turkey (1st title) (2026)
- Most titles: Russia (3 titles)
- Level on pyramid: 2
- Promotion to: EuroHockey Indoor Championship

The Women's EuroHockey Indoor Championship II, formerly known as the Women's EuroHockey Indoor Nations Trophy, is an international women's indoor hockey competition organized by the European Hockey Federation. It is the second level of women's European indoor hockey championships.

The tournament is part of the EuroHockey Indoor Championships and is the second level in the women's competition. The two first ranked teams qualify for the next EuroHockey Indoor Championship and are replaced by the two lowest-ranked teams from that tournament. The lowest two teams each year are relegated to the EuroHockey Indoor Championship III and replaced by the highest two teams from that competition.

The tournament has been won by nine different teams: Russia has the most titles with three, the Czech Republic and Ukraine have two titles and Lithuania, France, Belgium, Poland, the Netherlands and Spain have won the tournament once. The most recent edition was held in Sveti Ivan Zelina, Croatia and was won by Russia. The next edition will be held in Ourense, Spain in January 2022.

== Results ==
Year	Host	Final group rank				Number of teams
Year	Host	Winner	Runner-up	Third place	Fourth place	Number of teams
1996	Prague, Czech Republic	Russia	Lithuania	Czech Republic	Belgium	6
1998	Slagelse, Denmark	Czech Republic	Belarus	Ukraine	France	6
2000	Liévin, France	Lithuania	France	Poland	Denmark	6
2002	Rotterdam, Netherlands	Netherlands	Belarus	Poland	Switzerland	5
2004	Padua, Italy	Ukraine	Scotland	Poland	Italy	7
2006	La Spezia, Italy	Spain	Italy	Poland	Slovakia	8
2008	Nymburk, Czech Republic	Poland	Lithuania	Switzerland	Czech Republic	8
2010	Nymburk, Czech Republic	Czech Republic	Austria	Slovakia	Switzerland	8
2012	Slagelse, Denmark	France	England	Lithuania	Switzerland	8
2014; Details	Šiauliai, Lithuania	Ukraine	Belgium	Scotland	Switzerland	8
2016; Details	Cambrai, France	Russia	Switzerland	France	Lithuania	8
2018; Details	Brussels, Belgium	Belgium	Austria	England	Croatia	8
2020; Details	Sveti Ivan Zelina, Croatia	Russia	Turkey	Scotland	Poland	7
2022; Details	Ourense, Spain	Spain	Belgium	Poland	Switzerland	6
2024; Details	Galway, Ireland	Ireland	Lithuania	Croatia	Slovakia	6
2026; Details	Lousada, Portugal	Turkey	Italy	Sweden	Croatia	7

=== Summary ===
Team	Winners	Runners-up	Third place	Fourth place
Russia	3 (1996, 2016, 2020)			
Czech Republic	2 (1998, 2010*)		1 (1996*)	1 (2008*)
Ukraine	2 (2004, 2014)		1 (1998)	
Spain	2 (2006, 2022*)			
Lithuania	1 (2000)	3 (1996, 2008, 2024)	2 (2012)	1 (2016)
Belgium	1 (2018*)	2 (2014, 2022)		1 (1996)
France	1 (2012)	1 (2000*)	1 (2016*)	1 (1998)
Turkey	1 (2026)	1 (2020)		
Poland	1 (2008)		5 (2000, 2002, 2004, 2006, 2022)	1 (2020)
Netherlands	1 (2002*)			
Ireland	1 (2024*)			
Italy		2 (2006*, 2026)		1 (2004*)
Austria		2 (2010, 2018)		
Belarus		2 (1998, 2002)		
Scotland		1 (2004)	2 (2014, 2020)	
Switzerland		1 (2016)	1 (2008)	5 (2002, 2010, 2012, 2014, 2022)
England		1 (2012)	1 (2018)	
Slovakia			1 (2010)	2 (2006, 2024)
Croatia			1 (2024)	2 (2018, 2026)
Sweden			1 (2026)	
Denmark				1 (2000)

* = hosts

=== Team appearances ===
Team	(Czech Republic) 1996	(Denmark) 1998	(France) 2000	(Netherlands) 2002	(Italy) 2004	(Italy) 2006	(Czech Republic) 2008	(Czech Republic) 2010	(Denmark) 2012	(Lithuania) 2014	(France) 2016	(Belgium) 2018	(Croatia) 2020	(Spain) 2022	(Ireland) 2024	(Portugal) 2026	Total
Austria	—	—	–	–	–	–	–	2nd	–	–	–	2nd	–	–	–	–	2
Belarus	—	2nd	–	2nd	–	–	–	–	–	–	–	–	–	–	–	–	2
Belgium	4th	—	–	–	–	–	–	–	–	2nd	–	1st	–	2nd	–	–	4
Croatia	—	—	–	–	–	–	8th	–	–	–	7th	4th	6th	WD	3rd	4th	6
Czech Republic	3rd	1st	–	–	–	–	4th	1st	–	–	–	–	–	–	–	–	4
Denmark	—	5th	4th	–	–	–	–	5th	7th	–	–	–	–	–	–	–	4
England	—	—	–	–	–	–	–	–	2nd	–	5th	3rd	–	–	–	–	3
Finland	6th	—	5th	5th	–	–	–	–	–	–	–	–	–	–	–	7th	4
France	—	4th	2nd	–	–	–	–	–	1st	–	3rd	–	–	–	–	–	4
Greece	—	–	6th	–	–	–	–	–	–	–	–	–	–	–	–	–	1
Italy	—	–	–	–	4th	2nd	–	7th	–	–	–	–	–	–	–	2nd	4
Ireland	—	–	–	–	–	–	–	–	–	–	–	–	–	6th	1st	–	2
Lithuania	2nd	–	1st	–	–	7th	2nd	–	3rd	6th	4th	5th	5th	–	2nd	–	10
Netherlands	—	–	–	1st	–	–	–	–	–	–	–	–	–	–	–	–	1
Poland	—	–	3rd	3rd	3rd	3rd	1st	–	–	–	–	–	4th	3rd	–	–	8
Portugal	—	–	–	–	7th	8th	7th	8th	–	–	–	–	–	–	6th	6th	5
Russia	1st	–	–	–	–	6th	6th	6th	8th	5th	1st	–	1st	–	–	–	8
Scotland	—	–	–	–	2nd	–	–	–	5th	3rd	6th	7th	3rd	5th	–	–	7
Slovakia	—	–	–	–	6th	4th	5th	3rd	6th	8th	–	–	–	–	4th	5th	8
Spain	–	–	–	–	–	1st	–	–	–	–	–	–	–	1st	–	–	2
Sweden	5th	6th	–	–	–	–	–	–	–	–	–	6th	–	–	5th	3rd	5
Switzerland	—	–	–	4th	5th	5th	3rd	4th	4th	4th	2nd	–	–	4th	–	–	9
Turkey	—	–	–	–	–	–	–	–	–	–	–	–	2nd	–	–	1st	2
Ukraine	—	3rd	–	–	1st	–	–	–	–	1st	–	–	–	–	–	–	3
Wales	—	–	–	–	–	–	–	–	–	7th	8th	8th	7th	–	–	–	4
Total	6	6	6	5	7	8	8	8	8	8	8	8	7	6	6	7	

== See also ==
- Men's EuroHockey Indoor Championship II
- Women's EuroHockey Championship II
- Women's EuroHockey Indoor Championship
