= Gaziantep University =

Public university in Gaziantep, Turkey

Coordinates: 37.0348°N 37.3174°E

- Gaziantep Üniversitesi
- Type: Public
- Established: June 7, 1987; 39 years ago
- Rector: Arif Özaydin
- Faculty: 1,864
- Students: 56674
- Undergraduates: 20,268
- Postgraduates: 442
- Doctoral students: 58
- Location: Gaziantep, Turkey
- Campus: Suburban
- Language: Turkish, English
- Website: www.gantep.edu.tr

University rankings

Global – Overall
- USNWR Global: 824 (2021)

Regional – Overall
- QS Emerging Europe and Central Asia: 301-350 (2022)

Gaziantep University (Turkish: Gaziantep Üniversitesi) is a public university established on June 27, 1987, traces its origins to 1973 as an extension campus of the Middle East Technical University. Located in Gaziantep, Turkey, the university has 20 faculties and is recognized for its focus on scientific and technological research. The main campus is near Gaziantep's city center, with additional campuses in neighboring areas. English is the primary language of instruction, and the university ranked among the top 1,000 in the Times Higher Education World University Rankings for 2020–2021.

== History ==
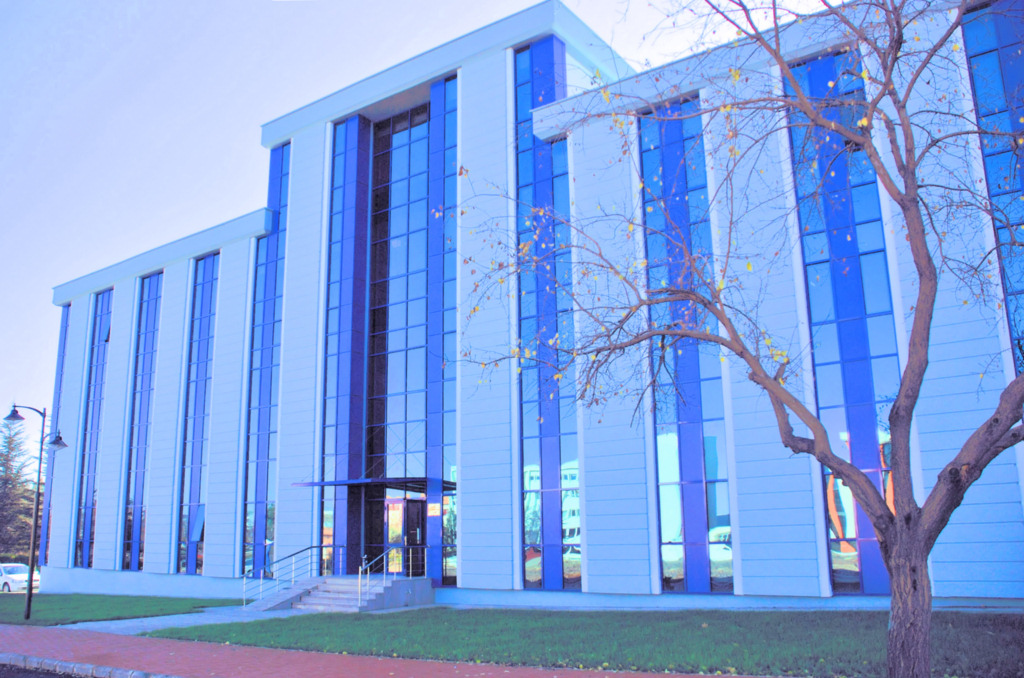
Gaziantep University Industrial Engineering Department

Established in 1973, the Department of Mechanical Engineering and, in 1974, the Faculty of Engineering, where the medium of instruction is English, laid the foundation of Gaziantep University. The Faculty of Engineering began with the Department of Electrical and Electronics Engineering in 1974, followed by the establishment of the Department of Food Engineering in 1977, the Department of Civil Engineering in 1981, and the Department of Engineering Physics in 1982.

Gaziantep University became an independent public university on June 27, 1987. The Faculty of Engineering, which was previously affiliated with Middle East Technical University, were incorporated into the newly established institution. Subsequently, additional faculties and schools were founded, including the Faculty of Medicine, the Faculty of Arts and Sciences, the Faculty of Economic and Administrative Sciences, the Faculty of Education in Adıyaman, the Vocational School of Higher Education in Kilis, and the Graduate Schools of Natural and Applied Sciences, Social Sciences, and Health Sciences. The State Conservatory of Turkish Music also became part of the university.

Between 1990 and 2003, the university expanded significantly with the addition of several departments and schools, such as the Vocational School of Higher Education for Health Services in 1990, the Departments of Industrial Engineering and Textile Engineering in 1995 and vocational schools across Gaziantep, Kilis, Besni, Nizip, and Gölbaşı. The Muallim Rifat Education Faculty in Kilis was established in 1998, followed by the Education Faculty in Gaziantep in 2002, and the Faculty of Arts and Sciences in Kilis in 2003.

Currently, Gaziantep University offers education through eight faculties, three higher schools, a conservatory, eight vocational schools, three graduate schools, and five service departments, including the Department of Physical Education and Sports, the Department of Turkish Language, the Higher School of Foreign Languages, the Department of Informatics, and the Department of Atatürk's Principles and the History of Turkish Renovation. These institutions provide courses in 107 undergraduate and graduate programs.

The university employs 624 academic staff, 424 teaching and research assistants, and 848 administrative staff. It serves 22,300 undergraduate students and 442 graduate students. Since its establishment, Gaziantep University has produced 22,242 graduates.

== Faculties ==
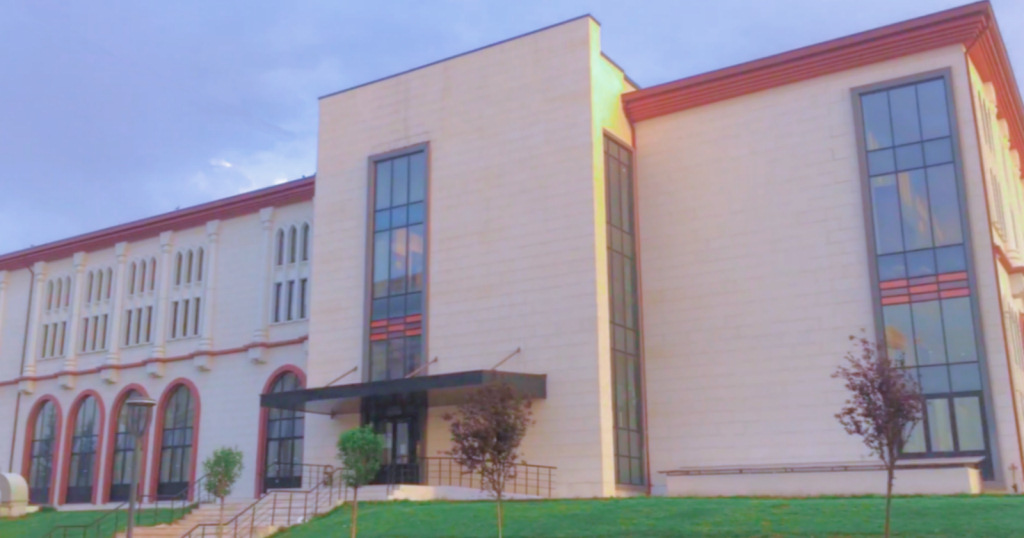
Gaziantep University Faculty of Law

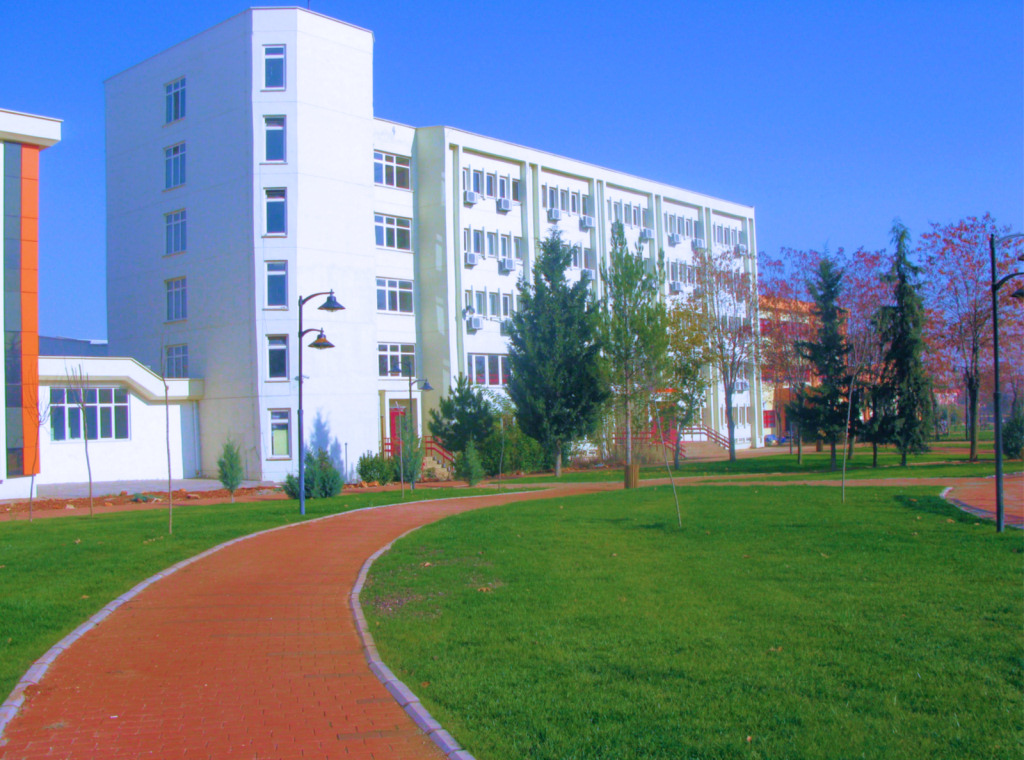
Gaziantep Faculty of Arts and Sciences

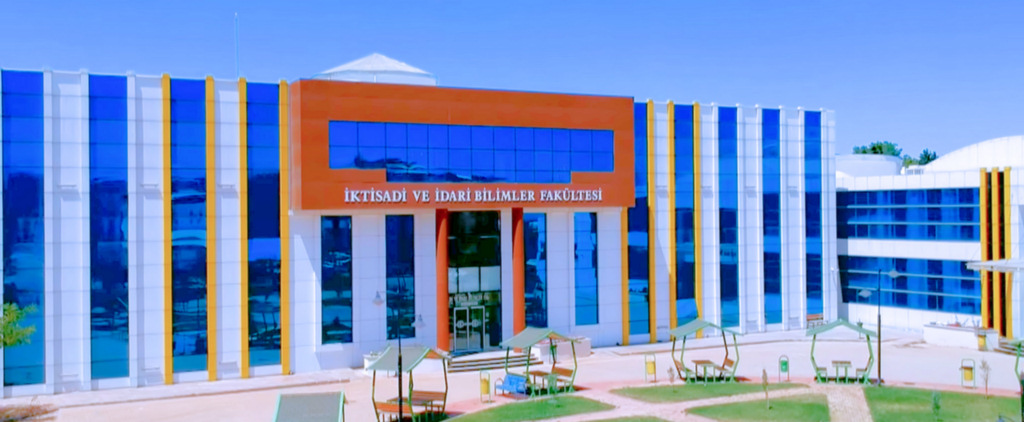
Gaziantep University Faculty of Economics and Administrative Sciences

- Faculty of Engineering

Department of Engineering Physics

The Department of Engineering Physics offers professional training in engineering physics, encouraging students to engage in both applied and theoretical research. Undergraduate laboratories provide hands-on experience, and students gain insight into the industrial applications of physics through summer internships conducted during the second and third years of the undergraduate program.

The department awards Bachelor of Science (B.S.), Master of Science (M.S.), and Doctor of Philosophy (Ph.D.) degrees in Engineering Physics. Graduates of the program find employment in various fields, including telecommunications, hospitals, research and development laboratories, power stations, and educational institutions.

Notably, there are only five Engineering Physics Departments in Turkish universities, each focusing on distinct areas. These departments are located at Istanbul Technical University, Istanbul Medeniyet University, Hacettepe University, Ankara University and Gaziantep University.

Main branches

- Nuclear physics
- Solid-state physics
- Mathematical physics
- General physics
- High-energy nuclear physics
- Particle physics
- Chemical physics
- Optical physics
- Laser physics
- Plasma physics
- Computational physics
- Applied physics
- Astrophysics
- Condensed matter physics
- Atomic and molecular physics

Department of Computer Engineering

Department of Electrical and Electronics Engineering

The Department of Electrical and Electronics Engineering aims to provide students with a comprehensive professional education, enabling them to engage in both applied and practical research. The department's laboratories are equipped to support practical courses, ensuring hands-on learning experiences. Students who complete the 4-year undergraduate program are awarded a Bachelor of Science (B.S.) degree.

Established in 1977, the program offers students the opportunity to specialize in various areas, including telecommunications, solid-state electronics, quantum electronics, power systems, microwave and antenna technology, high voltage systems, and computer science. The department also offers advanced degree programs leading to the Master of Science (M.S.) and Doctor of Philosophy (Ph.D.) qualifications.

Department of Industrial Engineering

Industrial Engineering (IE) is a discipline focused on the design and optimization of production systems, operations management, operations research (OR), ergonomics, automation, CAD/CAM, quality control, information technology (IT), artificial intelligence (AI), and systems simulation.

Students in Industrial Engineering begin with foundational courses common to other engineering disciplines, along with basic engineering sciences such as engineering drawing, statics, and strength of materials. In their later years, students take specialized IE courses, including those on manufacturing processes, which address various aspects of production and are closely linked to manufacturing systems.

The field also incorporates ergonomics, often referred to as human factors in other contexts, emphasizing the interaction between people and systems. Industrial engineers handle tasks such as sequencing orders, scheduling production batches, determining the number of material handling units, designing factory layouts, and optimizing sequences of motions.

Courses in probability and statistics form an essential part of the curriculum, followed by advanced IE courses in quality control, simulation, and stochastic processes, which prepare students to address complex industrial challenges.

Department of Civil Engineering

The Department of Civil Engineering is equipped with facilities to support education and research in areas such as construction materials, land surveying, structural mechanics, transportation, fluid mechanics, hydraulics, hydrology, and water resources. Laboratories dedicated to construction materials, structural mechanics, transportation, soil mechanics, and hydraulics are utilized for undergraduate instruction, graduate research, and providing expert services to industry.

Students who successfully complete their coursework are awarded a Bachelor of Science in Civil Engineering degree. As part of the program, students engage in practical engineering experiences at the end of their first, second, and third years. During the fourth year, technical elective courses are available, allowing students to deepen their expertise in specific fields of interest.

The department also offers a graduate program leading to a Master of Science (M.Sc.) in Civil Engineering. Graduate studies are available in specialized areas, including construction materials, transportation, hydraulics, structural mechanics, geotechnics, and construction management.

Department of Food Engineering

The Department of Food Engineering provides students with an engineering education focused on the production, preservation, and distribution of food products. The curriculum covers both theoretical and practical aspects of the food industry, addressing topics that span from the quality of raw materials to the final consumption of products by consumers.

Graduates with a Bachelor of Science (B.S.) degree in Food Engineering have employment opportunities in various areas, including production management, product and process development, process design, and project engineering. The skills of food engineers are essential for activities such as food preservation and food processing operations.

The department offers education at both undergraduate and graduate levels, including Master of Science (M.S.) and Doctor of Philosophy (Ph.D.) programs. The graduate programs are designed to enhance the depth and breadth of knowledge acquired at the undergraduate level, preparing students for advanced roles in academia, research, and industry.

Department of Mechanical Engineering

The Department of Mechanical Engineering encompasses a wide range of fields, from aerospace equipment and automobiles to heavy machinery, manufacturing, production, and management. Mechanical engineers engage in diverse areas, including design, manufacturing, research, development, operations, maintenance, education, and management.

The curriculum remains consistent with the program initially offered when the department was affiliated with Middle East Technical University (METU) and leads to Bachelor of Science (B.Sc.), Master of Science (M.Sc.), and Doctor of Philosophy (Ph.D.) degrees in Mechanical Engineering. In addition to general laboratories for undergraduate education, the department provides specialized facilities to support graduate research and industrial projects.

Department of Textile Engineering

The Department of Textile Engineering provides a comprehensive education, including laboratory training, leading to the Bachelor of Science (B.Sc.) degree. In addition to academic coursework, students are required to complete summer practice, offering hands-on experience to complement their theoretical knowledge.

Department of Metallurgy Engineering

- Faculty of Medicine
- Faculty of Dentistry
- Faculty of Architecture
- Faculty of Economic and Administrative Sciences
- Faculty of Education
- Faculty of Arts and Sciences

== Research ==
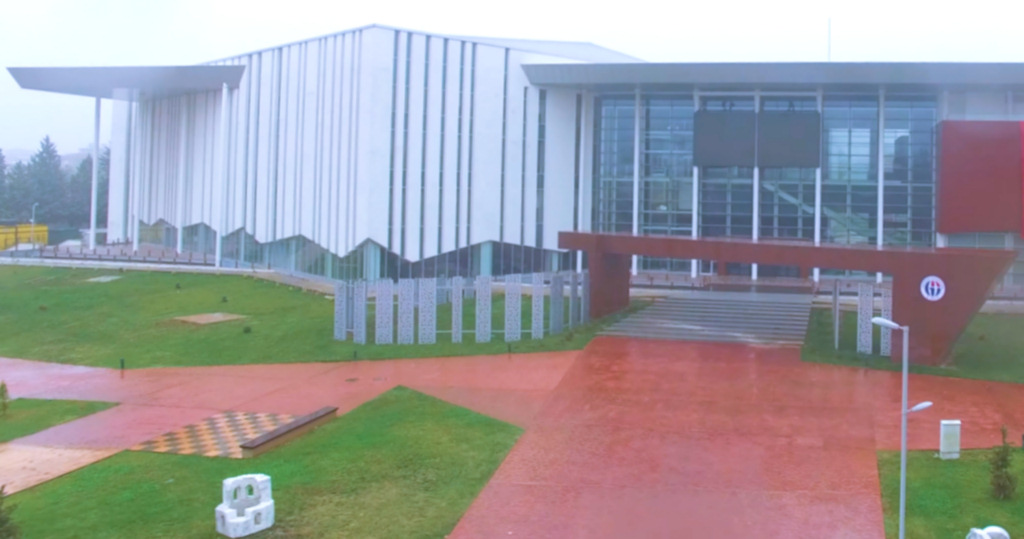
Gaziantep University Congress and Arts Center

Gaziantep University conducts research in a range of fields, including defense-related areas such as computer development, ballistics research, and inertial guidance systems. The university's academic programs, initially focused on physical sciences and engineering, have since expanded to include social sciences such as economics, linguistics, political science, and management, as well as medical and dental sciences, architecture, and other disciplines.

The location of the university in Southeast Anatolia provides opportunities for studying social issues in a real-life setting. Key research areas include environmental studies, energy research with an emphasis on solar and nuclear energy, materials science, construction, information and communication technology, ballistics research, and various social sciences.

In 2021, allegations of nepotism and favoritism surfaced in media reports, suggesting that among approximately 250 employees, including academic staff, fewer than ten different family names were represented. The university authorities did not provide further clarification on these claims.

== Library ==
Gaziantep University libraries house resources covering a wide range of disciplines, including physical sciences, medical sciences, engineering, social sciences, economics, philosophy, linguistics, political science, and management. In addition to the main library facilities, some academic departments maintain their own specialized libraries to support research and education in their respective fields.

== International outreach ==
In October 2019, the Official Gazette of the Republic of Turkey announced that Gaziantep University would establish a Faculty of Islamic Sciences in Azaz, a Faculty of Education in Afrin, and a Faculty of Economics and Administrative Sciences in Al-Bab, all located within Syria. Additionally, the university had previously opened a vocational school in Jarabulus in October 2018. These educational institutions operate within Syrian territory.

== See also ==
- Gaziantep
- List of universities in Turkey
