= Ryleigh Heck =

American field hockey player (born 2004)

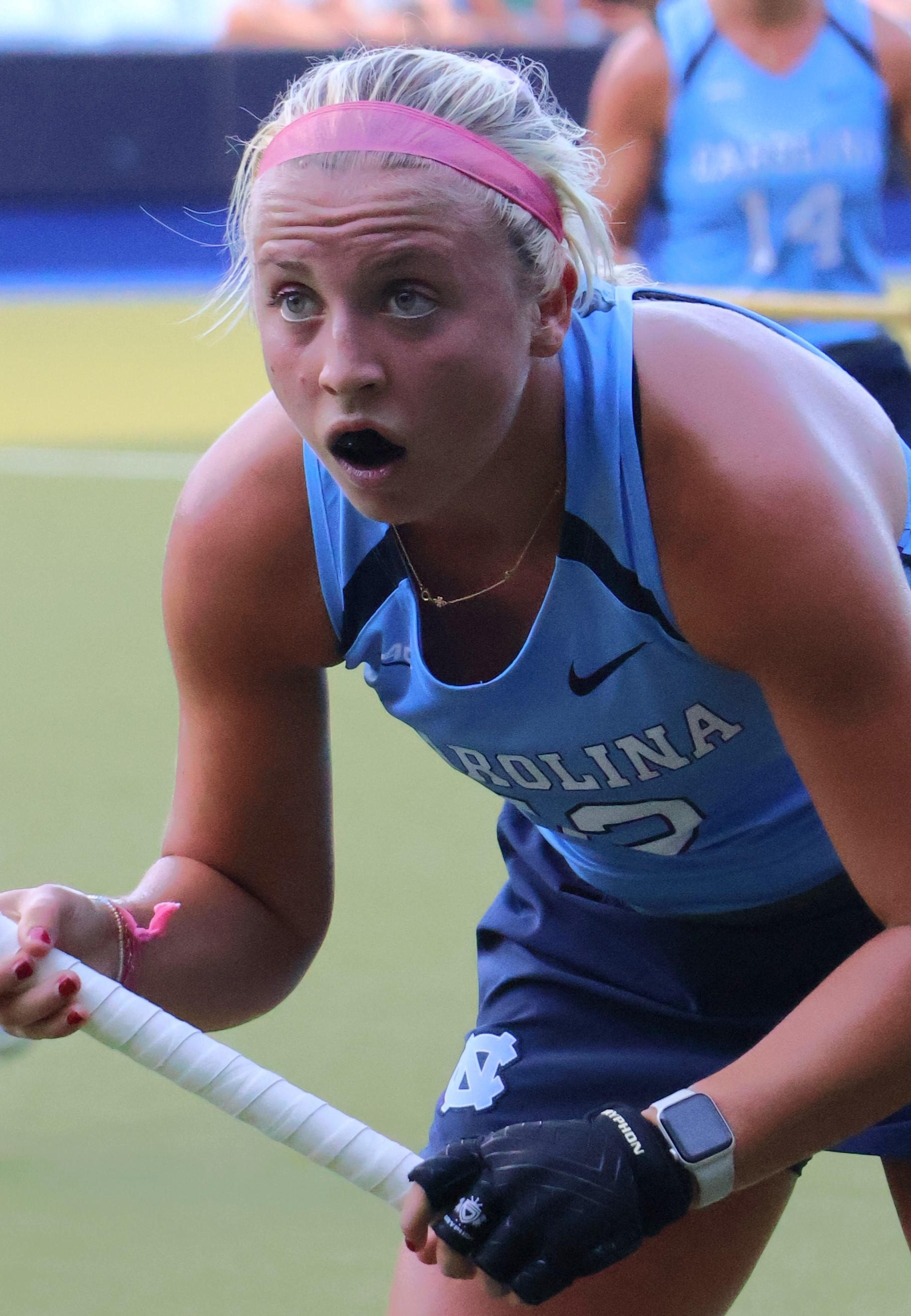
- Heck with North Carolina in 2024

Personal information
- Full name: Ryleigh Anne Heck
- Born: March 30, 2004 (age 22)
- Height: 5 ft 6 in (168 cm)

Sport
- Sport: Field hockey
- Position: Forward
- Club: North Carolina Tar Heels
National team
Years	Team	Caps	Goals
2022–	United States	0	-
2023–	U21 United States	9	(0)
2021–	United States (indoor)	10	(7)
Medal record
Representing United States
Women's field hockey
Pan American Cup
Silver medal – second place	2025 Montevideo
Women's Pan American Junior Championship
Gold medal – first place	2023 Santiago
Silver medal – second place	2024 Surrey
Women's indoor hockey
Women's Indoor Pan American Cup
Gold medal – first place	2021 Spring City
Gold medal – first place	2024 Calgary

Ryleigh Anne Heck (born March 30, 2004) is an American college field hockey player for the North Carolina Tar Heels. She has won two NCAA championships with the Tar Heels, in 2022 and 2023, and was named the NFHCA national player of the year in 2023.

== High school career ==
Heck was a three-time All-American and three-time state champion at Eastern Regional High School in New Jersey. She played alongside her senior sister Kara as a freshman in 2018, scoring 44 goals as the team became undefeated Tournament of Champions winners. She had been a center midfielder on her club team but was moved to center forward during her first season at Eastern. She totaled 78 goals in 25 games as a sophomore in 2019, as the team finished runners-up in the Tournament of Champions. She scored 76 goals in 14 games in the abbreviated 2020 season, when the state playoffs were not held. In her senior year in 2021, she broke the national single-season scoring record with 125 goals, with her last one being the game winner to claim her second Tournament of Champions. She was named the USA Today Field Hockey Player of the Year.

== College career ==
Heck started every game for the North Carolina Tar Heels as a freshman in 2022, receiving Atlantic Coast Conference (ACC) Freshman of the Year, first-team All-ACC, and second-team All-American honors. She helped the team go undefeated en route to winning the 2022 NCAA championship, where she opened scoring in the final to help beat Northwestern 2–1. As a sophomore in 2023, she led the team in scoring with 34 points on 13 goals and 8 assists, finishing the season with the winning goal of the title game penalty shootout in the 2023 NCAA tournament. She earned All-ACC and All-American first-team honors, the NFHCA National Player of the Year award, and the Honda Sports Award as the country's best player.

== International career ==
Heck was first called up to camp with the United States senior national team in July 2022 ahead of the 2022–23 Women's FIH Pro League. She won gold with the national under-21 team at the 2023 Women's Junior Pan American Championship and competed at the 2023 Women's FIH Hockey Junior World Cup.

In indoor hockey, Heck represented the United States on the winning team at the 2021 and 2024 Women's Indoor Pan American Cup.

== Personal life ==
Heck was raised in Shamong, New Jersey and now resides in Ocean City, New Jersey, the youngest of four children of Roy and Kerry Heck. Her father and her brother Jordan played college basketball at Stockton University; her mother played for James Madison's field hockey and lacrosse teams and coached Heck's last high school season; her brother Andrew played football at Ursinus College; her sister, Kara, played field hockey at Boston College and graduated in May 2024 and now plays field hockey at Rutgers University while attending Graduate School. Heck trained with the WC Eagles field hockey club.
