= Field hockey at the 2003 Pan American Games – Women's tournament =

Women's field hockey at the 2003 Pan American Games
Tournament details
- Host country: Dominican Republic
- City: Santo Domingo
- Dates: 3–13 August
- Teams: 10
- Venue: Santo Domingo Stadium

Final positions
- Champions: Argentina (5th title)
- Runner-up: United States
- Third place: Uruguay

Tournament statistics
- Matches played: 20
- Goals scored: 151 (7.55 per match)
- Top scorer: (Argentina) Alejandra Gulla (12 goals)

The women's field hockey tournament at the 2003 Pan American Games was the 5th edition of the field hockey event for women at the Pan American Games. It was held over a ten-day period beginning on 3 August, and culminating with the medal finals on 13 August. All games were played at the Santo Domingo Stadium in Santo Domingo, Dominican Republic.

Argentina won the gold medal for a record fifth time after defeating the United States 3–1 in the final. Uruguay won the bronze medal by defeating Chile 5–4 in penalties after the match finished a 2–2 draw.

The tournament served as the Pan American qualifier for the 2004 Summer Olympics in Athens, Greece.

== Qualification ==
Alongside the host nation, who received an automatic berth, eight teams participated in the tournament.

Dates	Event	Location	Qualifier(s)
Host nation			Dominican Republic
24 July – 4 August 1999	1999 Pan American Games	Winnipeg, Canada	Argentina
8–18 March 2001	2001 Pan American Cup	Kingston, Jamaica	Canada; United States; Uruguay
23 November – 3 December 2002	2002 CAC Games	San Salvador, El Salvador	Jamaica; Trinidad and Tobago
16–23 March 2003	2003 South American Championship	Santiago, Chile	Chile

== Officials ==
The following umpires were appointed by the PAHF and FIH to officiate the tournament.

- Mercedes Sánchez (ARG)
- Emma Simmons (BER)
- Keely Dunn (CAN)
- Ann van Dyk (CAN)
- Claudia Videla (CHL)
- Alison Hill (ENG)
- Alicia Takeda (MEX)
- Sarah Garnett (NZL)
- Susan Gomes (TTO)
- Jun Kentwell (USA)
- Rosario Ardanaz (URU)

== Results ==
=== Preliminary round ===
==== Pool A ====
Pos	Team	Pld	W	D	L	GF	GA	GD	Pts	Qualification
1	Argentina	3	3	0	0	47	1	+46	9	Semi-finals
2	Chile	3	2	0	1	24	14	+10	6	Semi-finals
3	Trinidad and Tobago	3	1	0	2	7	13	−6	3	
4	Dominican Republic (H)	3	0	0	3	1	51	−50	0	

Source: PAHF
Rules for classification: 1) points; 2) goal difference; 3) goals scored; 4) head-to-head result.
(H) Hosts

3 August 2003
08:30

Argentina	9–0	Trinidad and Tobago
Gulla 9', 37'; Rognoni 24', 56'; Aicega 29'; Del Carril 33'; Doreski 48'; Ferrari 50'; De la Paz Hernández 61'	Report

Umpires:
Jun Kentwell (USA)
Keely Dunn (CAN)

3 August 2003
15:30

Chile	20–0	Dominican Republic
D. Infante 4', 13', 29', 34', 38', 49', 51'; P. Infante 9'; García 17', 30', 51'; Mateluna 18', 19', 68'; Albertz 25', 28'; Rojas 44'; Martín 55'; Wilson 61'; Villagra 62'	Report

Umpires:
Ann van Dyk (CAN)
Mercedes Sánchez (ARG)

5 August 2003
17:30

Chile	3–1	Trinidad and Tobago
Villagra 26', 32'; D. Infante 45'	Report	Trotman 52'

Umpires:
Jun Kentwell (USA)
Alicia Takeda (MEX)

5 August 2003
19:30

Dominican Republic	0–25	Argentina
	Report	García 2', 42', 59'; Gulla 4', 24', 35', 38', 54', 58'; Margalot 10', 25', 29', 47', 49'; Ferrari 12', 44'; Rognoni 17', 20', 33', 52'; Aymar 18'; Doreski 22'; Del Carril 34'; Aicega 61', 63'

Umpires:
Keely Dunn (CAN)
Rosario Ardanaz (URU)

7 August 2003
08:30

Dominican Republic	1–6	Trinidad and Tobago
Céspedes 25'	Report	Trotman 5', 18'; Siu Butt 21', 35'; Dixon 44', 58'

Umpires:
Mercedes Sánchez (ARG)
Claudia Videla (CHL)

7 August 2003
17:30

Argentina	13–1	Chile
García 3', 10', 20', 33', 40', 62'; Gulla 6', 13', 15'; Gonzalez Oliva 11'; Del Carril 19'; De la Paz Hernández 27', 53'	Report	D. Infante 45'

Umpires:
Jun Kentwell (USA)
Ann van Dyk (CAN)

==== Pool B ====
Pos	Team	Pld	W	D	L	GF	GA	GD	Pts	Qualification
1	United States	3	3	0	0	13	0	+13	9	Semi-finals
2	Uruguay	3	1	1	1	6	6	0	4	Semi-finals
3	Canada	3	1	1	1	4	4	0	4	
4	Jamaica	3	0	0	3	0	13	−13	0	

Source: PAHF
Rules for classification: 1) points; 2) goal difference; 3) goals scored; 4) head-to-head result.

3 August 2003
17:30

United States	5–0	Jamaica
Reeve 2', 24'; Fuchs 22', 34'; Barber 28'	Report

Umpires:
Rosario Ardanaz (URU)
Sarah Garnett (NZL)

3 August 2003
19:30

Canada	1–1	Uruguay
Johnson 67'	Report	Mutílva 33'

Umpires:
Alicia Takeda (MEX)
Alison Hill (ENG)

5 August 2003
08:30

Uruguay	0–5	United States
	Report	Fuchs 32', 34', 49'; Rizzo 40'; Barber 53'

Umpires:
Alison Hill (ENG)
Claudia Videla (CHL)

5 August 2003
15:30

Canada	3–0	Jamaica
Rix 11'; D'Abreo 30'; Rushton 50'	Report

Umpires:
Susan Gomes (TTO)
Sarah Garnett (NZL)

7 August 2003
15:30

Uruguay	5–0	Jamaica
Ceretta 4', 27'; Bisignano 9'; Hernández 11'; Casabó 29'	Report

Umpires:
Alicia Takeda (MEX)
Susan Gomes (TTO)

7 August 2003
19:30

United States	3–0	Canada
Gannon 20'; Fuchs 21', 62'	Report

Umpires:
Sarah Garnett (NZL)
Alison Hill (ENG)

=== Classification round ===
==== Fifth to eighth place classification ====
Crossover
10 August 2003
Trinidad and Tobago	4
Jamaica	0
10 August 2003
Canada	10
Dominican Republic	0

Fifth Place
12 August 2003
Trinidad and Tobago	0
Canada	6
Seventh Place
12 August 2003
Jamaica	7
Dominican Republic	0

===== Crossover =====
10 August 2003
08:30

Canada	10–0	Dominican Republic
Jameson 6', 35'; Rezansoff 10', 24'; Hunt 15', 28', 57'; Buker 47'; Tingley 62'; Rix 68'	Report

Umpires:
Rosario Ardanaz (URU)
Claudia Videla (CHL)

10 August 2003
15:00

Trinidad and Tobago	4–0	Jamaica
Trotman 10', 19'; Siu Butt 25'; Dixon 62'	Report

Umpires:
Keely Dunn (CAN)
Mercedes Sánchez (ARG)

===== Seventh and eighth place =====
12 August 2003
08:30

Jamaica	7–0	Dominican Republic
Chambers 28', 48'; Grant 30', 33'; Hewitt 49'; S. Russell 66'; Smith 68'	Report

Umpires:
Keely Dunn (CAN)
Mercedes Sánchez (ARG)

===== Fifth and sixth place =====
12 August 2003
15:00

Trinidad and Tobago	0–6	Canada
	Report	Taunton 14'; Tingley 19', 39'; Rix 49'; Buker 59'; MacLean 68'

Umpires:
Claudia Videla (CHL)
Rosario Ardanaz (URU)

==== First to fourth place classification ====
Semi-finals
10 August 2003
Argentina	7
Uruguay	0
10 August 2003
United States	6
Chile	1

Gold Medal Match
13 August 2003
Argentina	3
United States	1
Bronze Medal Match
13 August 2003
Uruguay (pen.)	2 (5)
Chile	2 (4)

===== Semi-finals =====
10 August 2003
17:30

United States	6–1	Chile
Reeve 18'; Wooley 43', 60'; Gannon 56'; McCann 59'; Barber 67'	Report	D. Infante 70'

Umpires:
Alicia Takeda (MEX)
Ann van Dyk (CAN)

10 August 2003
20:00

Argentina	7–0	Uruguay
Aicega 11'; Gulla 25'; Rognoni 34'; Ferrari 37', 40'; González Oliva 43'; Aymar 67'	Report

Umpires:
Sarah Garnett (NZL)
Susan Gomes (TTO)

===== Third and fourth place =====
13 August 2003
08:30

Uruguay	2–2	Chile
Carlucío 14'; Hernández 63'	Report	Wilson 64'; Varas 69'
Penalties
Ceretta (penalty shoot-out scored); Chiara (penalty shoot-out scored); Arigon (penalty shoot-out scored); Casabó (penalty shoot-out scored); L. Margní (penalty shoot-out scored)	5–4	(penalty shoot-out scored) Villagra; (penalty shoot-out scored) D. Infante; (penalty shoot-out scored) García; (penalty shoot-out missed) P. Infante; (penalty shoot-out scored) Wilson

Umpires:
Jun Kentwell (USA)
Susan Gomes (TTO)

===== Gold medal match =====
13 August 2003
17:30

Argentina	3–1	United States
García 16', 38'; Del Carril 50'	Report	Fuchs 64'

Umpires:
Sarah Garnett (NZL)
Alison Hill (ENG)

Team details

United States
Argentina

GK	4	Margaret Storrar
DF	5	Tara Jelley
DF	15	Jill Reeve
MF	3	Kristen McCann
MF	7	Tracey Larson
MF	8	Kelli Gannon
MF	9	Tracey Fuchs
MF	17	Carrie Lingo
MF	11	Katie Kauffman (c)
FW	13	Keli Smith
FW	22	Kate Barber
Substitutions:
MF	14	Abbey Woolley	(substituted on) 16'
	24	Dina Rizzo	(substituted on) 9'
Coach:
(United States) Beth Anders

GK	1	Mariela Antoniska
DF	6	Ayelén Stepnik
DF	3	Magdalena Aicega (c)
DF	14	Mercedes Margalot
DF	16	Cecilia Rognoni
MF	12	Mariana González Oliva
MF	8	Luciana Aymar
FW	4	María Paz Ferrari
FW	7	Alejandra Gulla
FW	10	Soledad García
FW	23	Natalí Doreski
Substitutions:
MF	5	María Di Giácomo	(substituted on) 13'
FW	11	Cecilia Del Carril	(substituted on) 13'
FW	15	María P. Hernández	(substituted on) 16'
DF	24	Claudia Burkart	(substituted on) 47'
Manager:
(Argentina) Sergio Vigil

== Statistics ==
=== Final standings ===
Pos	Team	Pld	W	D	L	GF	GA	GD	Pts	Qualification
1st place, gold medalist(s)	Argentina	5	5	0	0	57	2	+55	15	Qualified to 2004 Summer Olympics
2nd place, silver medalist(s)	United States	5	4	0	1	20	4	+16	12	
3rd place, bronze medalist(s)	Uruguay	5	1	2	2	8	15	−7	5	
4	Chile	5	2	1	2	27	22	+5	7	
5	Canada	5	3	1	1	20	4	+16	10	
6	Trinidad and Tobago	5	2	0	3	11	19	−8	6	
7	Jamaica	5	1	0	4	7	17	−10	3	
8	Dominican Republic	5	0	0	5	1	68	−67	0	

Source: PAHF

=== Goalscorers ===
There were 151 goals scored in 20 matches, for an average of 7.55 goals per match.

12 goals

- (Argentina) Alejandra Gulla

11 goals

- (Argentina) Soledad García

10 goals

- (Chile) Daniela Infante

8 goals

- (United States) Tracey Fuchs

7 goals

- (Argentina) Cecilia Rognoni

5 goals

- (Argentina) María Paz Ferrari
- (Argentina) Mercedes Margalot
- (Trinidad and Tobago) Oire Trotman

4 goals

- (Argentina) Magdalena Aicega
- (Argentina) Cecilia del Carril

3 goals

- (Argentina) María de la Paz Hernández
- (Canada) Meggan Hunt
- (Canada) Emily Rix
- (Canada) Sue Tingley
- (Chile) Carolina García
- (Chile) Andrea Mateluna
- (Chile) Javiera Villagra
- (Trinidad and Tobago) Nicole Dixon
- (Trinidad and Tobago) Stacey-Ann Siu Butt
- (United States) Kate Barber
- (United States) Jill Reeve

2 goals

- (Argentina) Luciana Aymar
- (Argentina) Natalí Doreski
- (Argentina) Mariana González Oliva
- (Canada) Kim Buker
- (Canada) Stephanie Jameson
- (Canada) Kelly Rezansoff
- (Chile) Carolina Albertz
- (Chile) Michelle Wilson
- (Jamaica) Erica Chambers
- (Jamaica) Nicole Grant
- (United States) Kelli Gannon
- (United States) Abbey Wooley
- (Uruguay) María Ceretta
- (Uruguay) Ana Hernández

1 goal

- (Canada) Dana D'Abreo
- (Canada) Jennifer Johnson
- (Canada) Lauren MacLean
- (Canada) Andrea Rushton
- (Canada) Kristen Taunton
- (Chile) Paula Infante
- (Chile) Valentina Martín
- (Chile) Jessie Rojas
- (Chile) Carolina Varas
- (Dominican Republic) Alba Céspedes
- (Jamaica) Carla Hewitt
- (Jamaica) Sharee Russell
- (Jamaica) Annmarie Smith
- (United States) Kristen McCann
- (United States) Dina Rizzo
- (Uruguay) Anna Bisignano
- (Uruguay) Patricia Carlucío
- (Uruguay) Virginia Casabó
- (Uruguay) Carolina Mutíliva

Source: PAHF
