= 2005 Women's Indoor Pan American Cup =

International indoor hockey competition

Tournament details
- City: Kitchener, Canada
- Dates: 9–11 December
- Teams: 4 (from 1 confederation)

Final positions
- Champions: Canada (1st title)
- Runner-up: United States
- Third place: Trinidad and Tobago

Tournament statistics
- Matches played: 10
- Goals scored: 70 (7 per match)
- Top scorer(s): (Trinidad and Tobago) Nicole Aming (United States) Jennifer Mathis (9 goals)
- Best player: (Canada) Andrea Rushton

The 2005 Women's Indoor Pan American Cup was the 3rd edition of the Indoor Pan American Cup, an indoor hockey competition. The tournament was held in Kitchener, Canada, from 9–11 December.

Canada won the tournament for the first time, defeating the United States 2–1 in the final. Trinidad and Tobago won the bronze medal after defeating Venezuela 8–0 in the third place match.

== Teams ==
The following eight teams competed for the title:

- Canada
- Trinidad and Tobago
- United States
- Venezuela

== Results ==
=== Preliminary round ===
Pos	Team	Pld	W	D	L	GF	GA	GD	Pts
1	United States	3	3	0	0	17	3	+14	9
2	Canada (H)	3	2	0	1	13	2	+11	6
3	Trinidad and Tobago	3	1	0	2	11	11	0	3
4	Venezuela	3	0	0	3	1	26	−25	0

Source: PAHF
Rules for classification: 1) points; 2) goal difference; 3) games won; 4) head-to-head result.
(H) Hosts

==== Fixtures ====
9 December 2005
10:30

Trinidad and Tobago	9–1	Venezuela
Aming 6', 13', 24', 26', 28', 29'; Luces 10'; Abreu 32', 36'	Report	Nuñez 20'

Umpires:
Wendy Stewart (CAN)
Dorinda Martin (USA)

9 December 2005
11:30

Canada	1–2	United States
Buker 13'	Report	Mathis 18', 30'

Umpires:
Irene Clelland (SCO)
Alicia Takeda (MEX)

9 December 2005
15:30

Trinidad and Tobago	0–5	Canada
	Report	Leslie-Spencer 22', 25'; Rushton 23', 26'; Rix 32'

Umpires:
Dorinda Martin (USA)
Amy Hassick (USA)

9 December 2005
17:00

United States	10–0	Venezuela
Cook 7'; Holmes-Winn 12'; Broderick 17'; Mathis 18', 20', 21', 23'; Jelley 25'; Zelenak 37'; Phillips 39'	Report

Umpires:
Susie Gomes (TTO)
Keely Dunn (CAN)

10 December 2005
08:30

Canada	7–0	Venezuela
Rushton 6'; Buker 11'; Kedgley 13', 14', 20'; Rix 18'; Lee 29'	Report

Umpires:
Amy Hassick (USA)
Susie Gomes (TTO)

10 December 2005
10:00

United States	5–2	Trinidad and Tobago
Holmes-Winn 18'; Mazziotto 20'; Mathis 24', 29'; Phillips 32'	Report	Aming 5'; Luces 18'

Umpires:
Alicia Takeda (MEX)
Wendy Stewart (CAN)

=== Classification round ===
Semi-finals
10 December 2005
United States	11
Venezuela	0
10 December 2005
Canada	5
Trinidad and Tobago	1

Final
11 December 2005
United States	1
Canada	2
Third Place
11 December 2005
Venezuela	0
Trinidad and Tobago	8

==== Semi-finals ====
10 December 2005
13:30

United States	11–0	Venezuela
Randall 3'; Phillips 9', 30'; Jelley 13', 14', 36'; Broderick 18', 23', 35'; Holmes-Winn 22'; Mathis 38'	Report

Umpires:
Keely Dunn (CAN)
Wendy Stewart (CAN)

10 December 2005
15:00

Canada	5–1	Trinidad and Tobago
Rushton 3', 4', 24'; Leslie-Spencer 6'; Fitzgerald 8'	Report	James 19'

Umpires:
Keely Dunn (CAN)
Wendy Stewart (CAN)

==== Third and fourth place ====
11 December 2005
09:30

Venezuela	0–8	Trinidad and Tobago
	Report	Aming 2', 18'; Luces 4', 16', 20'; Abreu 22'; Thompson 37', 40'

Umpires:
Dorinda Martin (USA)
Keely Dunn (CAN)

==== Final ====
11 December 2005
13:30

United States	1–2	Canada
Jelley 25'	Report	Rushton 16', 23'

Umpires:
Irene Clelland (SCO)
Susie Gomes (TTO)

== Statistics ==
=== Final standings ===
Pos	Team	Pld	W	D	L	GF	GA	GD	Pts	Qualification
1st place, gold medalist(s)	Canada (H)	5	4	0	1	20	4	+16	12	Qualified to 2007 FIH Indoor World Cup
2nd place, silver medalist(s)	United States	5	4	0	1	29	5	+24	12	
3rd place, bronze medalist(s)	Trinidad and Tobago	5	2	0	3	20	16	+4	6	
4	Venezuela	5	0	0	5	1	45	−44	0	

Source: PAHF
(H) Hosts

=== Goalscorers ===
There were 70 goals scored in 10 matches, for an average of 7 goals per match.

9 goals

- (Trinidad and Tobago) Nicole Aming
- (United States) Jennifer Mathis

8 goals

- (Canada) Andrea Rushton

5 goals

- (Trinidad and Tobago) Yesenia Luces
- (United States) Tara Jelley

4 goals

- (United States) Sarah Broderick
- (United States) Deborah Phillips

3 goals

- (Canada) Philippa Kedgley
- (Canada) Robin Leslie-Spencer
- (Trinidad and Tobago) Cristina Abreu
- (United States) Kristen Holmes-Winn

2 goals

- (Canada) Kimberley Buker
- (Canada) Emily Rix
- (Trinidad and Tobago) Kristin Thompson

1 goal

- (Canada) Carolyn Fitzgerald
- (Canada) Alexandra Lee
- (Trinidad and Tobago) Tonya-Marie James
- (United States) Sandra Cook
- (United States) Lauren Mazziotto
- (United States) Meredith Randall
- (United States) Denise Zelenak
- (Venezuela) Lilia Nuñez
