= Nurhan Çınar =

Turkish field hockey player

Personal information
- Born: 14 November 1994 (age 31) Malatya, Turkey

Sport
- Sport: Field hockey
- Club: Keçiören Bağlumspor
National team
Years	Team	Caps	Goals
2011	Turkey U18 Girls'		-
2012	Turkey U21 Women's		-
Medal record
Women's Field hockey
Representing Turkey
European Championships
Silver medal – second place	2012 Lisbon	U21 III Team
Bronze medal – third place	2011 Minsk	U18 III Team
- Updated on 27 May 2013

Nurhan Çınar (born 1994) is a Turkish female field hockey player.

== Sport career ==
A native of Malatya, she played in the Turkey U18 girls' national team, and won the bronze medal at the 2011 EuroHockey U18 Girls' Championship III held in Smolevichi, Minsk, Belarus. She was named the Most Valuable Player. In 2012, she was with the Turkey junior women's national team, which placed second at the 2012 EuroHockey Junior Women's Championships III held on 19–22 July in Lisbon, Portugal.

Nurhan Çınar studies at the Abant İzzet Baysal University (AİBÜ) in Bolu and plays in its AIBU HighWay Outlet Women's Hockey Team. The team took part at the 2013 Eurohockey Women's Indoor Club Challenge I held on 22–24 February 2013 in Lisbon, Portugal, and became champion without losing a game. Çınar was named Top Scorer of the tournament. She won with her university team also the newly established Turkish Intercollegiate Hockey Championship held on 4–7 April 2013 at the Abant İzzet Baysal University.

Çınar is a member of Keçiören Bağlumspor's women hockey team. After winning the 2012 Turkish Field Hockey Women's Super League, her team qualified for participation at the 2013 Eurohockey Women's Club Champions Challenge III held on 17–20 May 2013 in Porto, Portugal. They became undefeated champion, and she was selected Top Scorer with seven goals.

She played for Gaziantep Polisgücü SK at the 2018 Women's EuroHockey Club Challenge III, where her team became undefeated champion. She was named Top Goalscorer with 11 goals netted.

== Achievements ==
- (bronze) 2011 EuroHockey U18 Girls' Championship III – Minsk, Belarus
- (silver) 2012 EuroHockey Junior Women's Championships III – July 19–22 – Lisbon, Portugal
- (gold) 2013 Eurohockey Women's Indoor Club Challenge I – February 22–24 – Lisbon, Portugal
- (gold) 2013 Eurohockey Women's Club Champions Challenge III – May 17–20 – Porto, Portugal
- (gold) 2018 Women's EuroHockey Club Challenge III).

== Honors ==
=== Club ===
- 2013 Eurohockey Women's Indoor Club Challenge I – Lisbon, Portugal – Top Scorer
- 2013 Eurohockey Women's Club Champions Challenge III – Porto, Portugal – Top Scorer

=== National team ===
- 2011 EuroHockey U18 Girls' Championship III – Minsk, Belarus – Most Valuable Player

=== Individual ===
Most Valuable Player (1)
2011 EuroHockey U18 Girls' Championship III.

Top Goalscorer (1)
2018 Women's EuroHockey Club Challenge III (11 goals).

== See also ==
- Turkish women in sports
