= 2024 Women's Indoor Pan American Cup =

International indoor hockey tournament

Tournament details
- Host country: Canada
- City: Calgary
- Dates: 19–22 March
- Teams: 4 (from 1 confederation)
- Venue: Seven Chiefs Sportsplex

Final positions
- Champions: United States (3rd title)
- Runner-up: Argentina
- Third place: Uruguay

Tournament statistics
- Matches played: 10
- Goals scored: 75 (7.5 per match)
- Top scorer: (United States) Reese D'Ariano (16 goals)
- Best player: (United States) Reese D'Ariano

The 2024 women's Indoor Pan American Cup was the ninth edition of the Women's Indoor Pan American Cup, the quadrennial international women's indoor hockey championship of the Americas, organized by the Pan American Hockey Federation. It was held alongside the men's tournament at the Seven Chiefs Sportsplex in Calgary, Canada from 19 to 22 March 2024.

The United States were the two-time defending champions, having won their second title at the 2021 edition. They defended their title by defeating Argentina 3–2 in a shoot-out after the final finished 5–5. Uruguay won the bronze medal by defeating the hosts Canada 3–1. As winners the United States qualified for the 2025 Women's FIH Indoor Hockey World Cup.

== Teams ==
The following four teams participated in the tournament:

- Argentina
- Canada
- Uruguay
- United States

== Preliminary round ==
=== Standings ===
Pos	Team	Pld	W	D	L	GF	GA	GD	Pts	Qualification
1	United States	3	3	0	0	22	4	+18	9	Semi-finals
2	Argentina	3	2	0	1	13	9	+4	6	Semi-finals
3	Canada (H)	3	0	1	2	7	14	−7	1	Semi-finals
4	Uruguay	3	0	1	2	6	21	−15	1	Semi-finals

Source: FIH
Rules for classification: 1) points; 2) matches won; 3) goal difference; 4) goals for; 5) head-to-head result; 6) field goals for.
(H) Hosts

=== Results ===
19 March 2024
10:00

United States	7–1	Argentina
Heck 8', 15', 21'; Rose 14'; D'Ariano 22', 33', 34'	Report	Irianni 4'

Umpires:
Lelia Sacre (CAN)
Joanne Wudrich (CAN)

19 March 2024
15:45

Canada	4–4	Uruguay
Lee 9', 20', 29', 35'	Report	Amadeo 12'; Algorta 20', 24'; Civetta 22'

Umpires:
Richanne Gaskin (BAR)
Melina Illanes (ARG)

20 March 2024
12:30

Argentina	8–1	Uruguay
Irianni 3', 4', 39'; Bocchero 15'; Navarro 19', 25'; Gomes 28', 32'	Report	Amadeo 2'

Umpires:
Brian Tyson (USA)
Pambavasan Manikandan (CAN)

20 March 2024
15:00

Canada	2–6	United States
Leahy 28'; Lee 34'	Report	D'Ariano 10', 18', 23', 25', 39'; Matson 37'

Umpires:
Kevin George (TTO)
Shane Lewis (BAR)

21 March 2024
12:30

United States	9–1	Uruguay
Heck 10'; D'Ariano 11', 22', 38'; Rose 18', 29', 31', 32'; Weber 36'	Report	Civetta 13'

Umpires:
Joanne Wudrich (CAN)
Shane Lewis (BAR)

21 March 2024
15:00

Argentina	4–1	Canada
Irianni 5', 26'; Amaya 34'; Navarro 37'	Report	Leahy 12'

Umpires:
Ayanna McClean (TTO)
Richanne Gaskin (BAR)

== First to fourth place classification ==
=== Bracket ===
Semi-finals
22 March
Argentina	6
Canada	2
22 March
United States	5
Uruguay	0

Final
22 March
Argentina	5 (2)
United States (s.o.)	5 (3)
Third place
22 March
Canada	1
Uruguay	3

=== Semi-finals ===
22 March 2024
10:00

Argentina	6–2	Canada
Amaya 3', 7'; Irianni 5', 20'; Navarro 7', 37'	Report	Wong 32'; Lee 36'

Umpires:
Ayanna McClean (TTO)
Shane Lewis (BAR)

22 March 2024
12:30

United States	5–0	Uruguay
Heck 6'; Rose 15', 26'; D'Ariano 20'; Ferri 22'	Report

Umpires:
Melina Illanes (ARG)
Joanne Wudrich (CAN)

=== Third and fourth place ===
22 March 2024
15:45

Canada	1–3	Uruguay
Lee 23'	Report	Amadeo 19'; Algorta 22'; Civetta 39'

Umpires:
Richanne Gaskin (BAR)
Brian Tyson (USA)

=== Final ===
22 March 2024
18:15

Argentina	5–5	United States
Irianni 6', 23'; Navarro 28', 37'; Amaya 3', 7'	Report	Matson 18'; D'Ariano 20', 26', 26', 37'
Penalties
Ríos (penalty shoot-out scored); Irianni (penalty shoot-out missed); Amaya (penalty shoot-out scored)	2–3	(penalty shoot-out scored) Heck; (penalty shoot-out scored) Rose; (penalty shoot-out scored) Matson

Umpires:
Ayanna McClean (TTO)
Kevin George (TTO)

== Statistics ==
=== Final standings ===
Pos	Team	Qualification
1st place, gold medalist(s)	United States	2025 Indoor World Cup
2nd place, silver medalist(s)	Argentina	
3rd place, bronze medalist(s)	Uruguay	
4	Canada (H)	

Source: FIH
(H) Host

=== Goalscorers ===
There were 75 goals scored in 10 matches, for an average of 7.5 goals per match.

16 goals

- (United States) Reese D'Ariano

10 goals

- (Argentina) Lara Irianni

7 goals

- (Canada) Alison Lee
- (United States) Hope Rose

6 goals

- (Argentina) Martina Navarro

5 goals

- (Argentina) Victoria Amaya
- (United States) Ryleigh Heck

3 goals

- (Uruguay) Milagros Algorta
- (Uruguay) Sol Amadeo
- (Uruguay) Elisa Civetta

2 goals

- (Argentina) Julia Gomes
- (Canada) Kathleen Leahy
- (United States) Erin Matson

1 goal

- (Argentina) Natalia Bocchero
- (Canada) Elise Wong
- (United States) Sofia Ferri
- (United States) Melea Weber

Source: FIH
