= Victoria Amaya =

Argentine indoor hockey player

Personal information
- Born: Ushuaia, Tierra del Fuego, Argentina

Sport
- Sport: Field hockey
Senior career
Years	Team	Caps	Goals
2024	Gaziantep Polisgücü	-	-
National team
Years	Team	Caps	Goals
2016–	Argentina		-
Medal record
Women's Indoor hockey
Representing Argentina
Women's Indoor Pan American Cup
Silver medal – second place	2024 Calgary	Team
Bronze medal – third place	2021 Spring City	Team
Silver medal – second place	2017 Georgetown	Team

Victoria Amaya is an Argentine professional indoor hockey player who is a member of the Argentina national team. She last played for the Turkish club Gaziantep Polisgücü SK in 2024.

== Club career ==
In February 2024, Amaya moved to Turkey, and joined the Turkish Women's Indoor Hockey Super League club Gaziantep Polisgücü SK. She took part at the 2024 Women's EuroHockey Indoor Club Cup in Alanya, Turkey for Gaziantep Polisgücü SK. She won the silver medal in the European Club Cup.

== International career ==
As part of the Argentina national team, nicknamed "Las Leonas", Amaya played in three Women's Indoor Pan American Cup competitions, and scored six goals in 14 games in total. She won the silver medal in 2017 in Georgetown, Guyana, the bronze medal in 2021 in Spring City, United States and again the silver medal in 2024 in Calgary, Canada.

== Honours ==
=== Club ===
Gaziantep Polisgücü SK

Women's EuroHockey Indoor Club Cup
(silver) (1): 2024

=== International ===
Argentina indoor

Women's Indoor Pan American Cup
(silver) (2): 2017, 2024
(bronze) (1): 2021
