= Ben Casparius =

American baseball player (born 1999)

Los Angeles Dodgers – No. 78
- Pitcher
- Born: February 11, 1999 (age 27); Westport, Connecticut, U.S.
- Bats: Right Throws: Right

MLB debut
- August 31, 2024, for the Los Angeles Dodgers

MLB statistics (through 2026 season)
- Win–loss record: 9–6
- Earned run average: 4.67
- Strikeouts: 87
- Stats at Baseball Reference

Teams
- Los Angeles Dodgers (2024–present)

Career highlights and awards
- World Series champion (2024)

Benjamin Keith Casparius (born February 11, 1999) is an American professional baseball pitcher for the Los Angeles Dodgers of Major League Baseball (MLB).

== Career ==
=== Amateur career ===
Casparius attended Staples High School in Westport, Connecticut, where he set the state's all-time hits record and led them to a state title in 2017 while being awarded as the Connecticut Gatorade Player of the Year. He played college baseball at University of North Carolina at Chapel Hill for two years, where he was a two-way player. As a freshman he had a 1.69 ERA in 10 pitching appearances while collecting 18 hits and 15 RBI and helping them to a berth in the College World Series. The following season, he struggled a bit at the plate so the Tar Heels asked him to concentrate on pitching where he had a 4.41 ERA in 12 outings. After the season, he played collegiate summer baseball in both the Cape Cod League with the Falmouth Commodores, and in the New England Collegiate Baseball League.

He transferred to the University of Connecticut Huskies in 2020, but was denied a waiver and had to sit out his junior season, which wound up being cancelled anyway by the COVID-19 pandemic. He played instead in the Futures Collegiate Baseball League for the New Britain Bees and hoped to be selected in the 2020 MLB draft but because of its shortened length he was not chosen and opted to play for the Huskies in 2021. In 15 starts he was 8–5 with a 4.03 ERA.

=== Los Angeles Dodgers ===
Casparius was selected by the Los Angeles Dodgers in the fifth round of the 2021 Major League Baseball draft, and signed for a $247,500 bonus on July 26.

Casparius spent his first professional season with the Arizona Complex League Dodgers and Rancho Cucamonga Quakes, pitching in five games and allowing two earned runs in six innings. He pitched 2022 with Rancho Cucamonga and the Great Lakes Loons, pitching 89 2/3 innings in 27 games (16 starts) for a 6.42 ERA. The following season, with Great Lakes and the Tulsa Drillers he made 26 appearances (21 starts) and was 6–7 with a 5.27 ERA. After the 2023 season, Casparius pitched in the Arizona Fall League for the Glendale Desert Dogs. He started 2024 with Tulsa, making five starts with a 3.32 ERA before being promoted to the Triple-A Oklahoma City Baseball Club. In 16 games (14 starts) at Triple-A, he was 4–3 with a 3.36 ERA and 72 strikeouts.

Casparius was promoted to the major leagues for the first time on August 18, 2024, but was optioned back to Oklahoma City on August 21, without appearing in a major league game. Casparius was promoted to the major leagues for a second time on August 31 and made his debut that day in relief against the Arizona Diamondbacks, working a scoreless inning of relief to pick up his first career win. His first strikeout was of Nolan Jones of the Colorado Rockies on September 22. He pitched a total of 8 1/3 innings in three games, with two wins, nine hits and two runs allowed with 12 strikeouts.

After initially being left off the postseason roster, Casparius was added to the roster midway through the Division Series when Michael Grove suffered an injury, though he did not pitch in the series. He did pitch 4 1/3 scoreless innings in the National League Championship Series, picking up the win in the clinching sixth game. In the 2024 World Series against the New York Yankees, Casparius started the fourth game, allowing one run on one hit and three walks in two innings. It was his only appearance in the series, which the Dodgers won in five games.

In 2025, Casparius made the Dodgers opening day roster and he became an important member of the bullpen, providing length when needed. In June, as a result of several pitching injuries to the staff, Casparius was moved to the starting rotation. He struggled in that role and returned to the pen a month later. He was optioned back to the minors on September 9. In 46 games, Casparius had a 7–5 record and 4.64 ERA with 71 strikeouts. He also made five appearances for Oklahoma City, allowing two runs in 5 1/3 innings. Casparius was on the active roster for the 2025 NLCS but did not appear in any games, he was inactive for the other postseason series.

Casparius began the 2026 season on the Dodgers active roster and pitched 4 2/3 innings over five games, allowing five runs on six hits and four walks. However, he suffered a shoulder injury and was placed on the injured list on April 13. Casparius was transferred to the 60-day injured list on May 18. He made rehab appearances in the minors for the Oklahoma City Comets in late July and early August, allowing nine runs in 10 1/3 innings but continued to suffer from shoulder issues and was shut down on September 2. He missed the remainder of the season.

== Personal life ==
Casparius was in a relationship with North Carolina field hockey coach Erin Matson.

== See also ==
- List of World Series starting pitchers
