= Erin Matson (field hockey) =

American field hockey coach (born 2000)

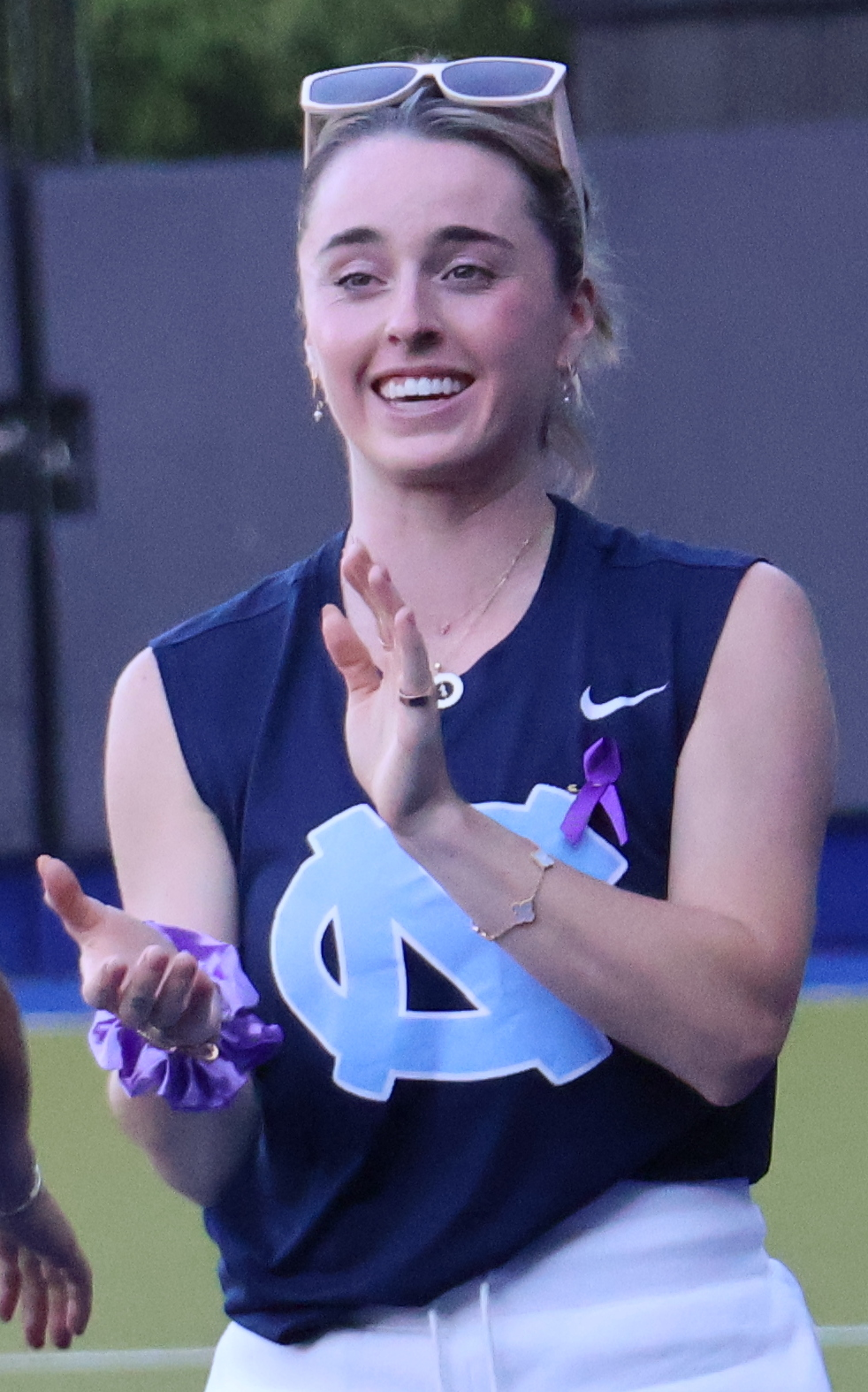
- Matson coaching North Carolina in 2024

Current position
- Title: Head Coach
- Team: North Carolina
- Conference: ACC
- Record: 59–6

Biographical details
- Born: March 17, 2000 (age 26); Chadds Ford, Pennsylvania, U.S.
- Education: North Carolina

Playing career
- 2018–2022: North Carolina
- Position: Midfielder

Coaching career (HC unless noted)
- 2023–present: North Carolina

Head coaching record
- Overall: 59–6

Accomplishments and honors

Championships
- As a player: 4x NCAA Champion (2018–2020, 2022); 5x ACC Champion (2018–2022); As a coach: NCAA Champion (2023); 3x ACC Champion (2023, 2024, 2025)

Awards
- As a player: 5x ACC Offensive Player of the year (2018–2022); 5x ACC Player of the Year (2018–2022); 3x Honda Sports Award Winner; ACC Athlete of the Year (2020)
- Field hockey career
- Height: 5 ft 4 in (163 cm)
- Sport: Field hockey
- Position: Midfielder
National team
Years	Team	Caps	Goals
2017–	United States	48	(9)
Medal record
Women's field hockey
Representing the United States
Pan American Cup
Bronze medal – third place	2017 Lancaster
Pan American Games
Bronze medal – third place	2019 Lima	Team

Erin Matson (born March 17, 2000) is an American field hockey coach and former player who is the head coach of the North Carolina Tar Heels field hockey team. She has led the Tar Heels to win five NCAA championships, four as a player (2018–2020, 2022) and one as a coach (2023).

Matson is one of only two players to be selected to the United States national team at age 16; the first was Katie Bam, selected in 2005.

== Early life ==
Matson grew up in Chadds Ford, Pennsylvania, and started playing field hockey in 2006. Her mother, Jill, played field hockey and softball at Yale, and her father, Brian, played baseball at Delaware. Matson played as a midfielder and graduated from Unionville High School in 2018. In high school, she committed to play collegiate field hockey at the University of North Carolina at Chapel Hill, under head coach Karen Shelton.

== College career ==
In the fall of 2018, Matson made her debut in Chapel Hill, and over the course of her time there, became one of the most decorated athletes in North Carolina Tar Heels history, with career achievements rivaling those of Michael Jordan, Mia Hamm, and Tyler Hansbrough. While at North Carolina, she won the Honda Sports Award three times, being recognized as the nation's top collegiate field hockey player in 2019, 2020, and 2022. She won four NCAA Championships as a player (2018, 2019, 2020, and 2022), and five ACC titles in her five seasons in Chapel Hill. Due to the COVID-19 pandemic, the NCAA granted all student-athletes an extra year of eligibility, which Matson used to return to Carolina for a fifth playing season in 2022. Matson was recognized as the ACC Player of the Year and ACC Offensive Player of the Year every season she played at Carolina.

== Coaching career ==
Following Karen Shelton's retirement in December 2022, and just a month after her own graduation from UNC, Matson was named the Tar Heels' head coach on January 31, 2023. In a move that paralleled Shelton's own hiring 42 years prior (Shelton was 23 when she became head coach), Matson became the Tar Heels' head coach at the age of 22. Matson inherited a defending national championship team made up of many of her former teammates. On November 19, 2023, the Tar Heels won the NCAA field hockey national championship, their 5th title in 6 years; this made Matson the second youngest NCAA Division I coach in history to win a national championship, just two months older than Myron Roderick was at the time of his win.

== Career highlights ==
Matson was part of the United States team at the 2016–17 Hockey World League Semifinals in Johannesburg, South Africa. In the final, Matson scored the winning goal in a penalty shootout against Germany. Matson has represented the US in four other international competitions in her career, the first being the 2014 Youth Indoor Pan American Games.

- World Championship Experience
  - 2019 FIH Hockey Olympic Qualifier (Bhubaneswar, India)
  - Gold - 2017 World League Semifinals (Johannesburg, South Africa)
  - Silver - 2016 Junior Pan American Games (Trinidad & Tobago)
  - Bronze - 2019 Pan American Games (Lima, Peru)
  - Bronze - 2017 Pan American Cup (Lancaster, Pa.)
  - Bronze - 2014 Indoor Pan American Games (Montevideo, Uruguay)
  - 7th - 2017 World League Final (Auckland, New Zealand)
  - 8th - 2016 Women's Hockey Junior World Cup (Santiago, Chile)
  - 9th - 2019 FIH Pro League (worldwide)
  - 14th - 2018 Vitality Hockey Women's World Cup (London, England)
- Other Career Highlights
  - 2021: At UNC, named All-ACC Preseason Team, ACC Offensive Player of the Week (Sept. 7), NFHCA Division I Offensive Player of the Week (Sept. 8)
  - 2021: Named to the U.S. Women's National Team (June)
  - 2021: Named to the U.S. U22 Junior Pan American Championship Training Squad
  - 2021 Spring: At UNC, ACC Co-Offensive Player of the Week (March 16), ACC Offensive Player of the Week (April 13, April 20), Ranked 10th in Female Athletes in ACC History, ACC Offensive Player of the Year, First-Team All-ACC, All-NCAA Tournament Team, All-NCC Tournament Most Valuable Player, NCAA Division I National Champion, Honda Sports Award Winner, All-South Region First Team, NFHCA South Regional Player of the Year, All-ACC Field Hockey Academic Team, NFHCA Division I First-Team All-American, NFHCA Division I National Player of the Year
  - 2020: At UNC, Preseason All-ACC Team, ACC Offensive Player of the Week (Oct. 20, Nov. 3), All-ACC Tournament Team, ACC Tournament MVP, NFHCA Division I Offensive Player of the Week (Nov. 4, Nov. 11)
  - 2019: Named to 2019 Pan American Elite Team
  - 2019: At UNC, Preseason All-ACC Team, First-Team All-ACC, ACC Offensive Player of the Year, ACC Offensive Player of the Week (Sept. 3, Sept. 10, Sept. 24, Oct. 1, Oct. 15), NFHCA Division I Offensive Player of the Week (Sept. 4, Sept. 11, Oct. 2), NCAA Division I National Champion, All-NCAA Tournament Team, All-NCAA Tournament Outstanding Player, All-South Region First Team, First Point USA/NFHCA South Region Player of the Year, Longstreth/NFHCA Division I First-Team All-American, First Point USA/NFHCA Division I National Player of the Year, Honda Sport Award Winner, All-ACC Field Hockey Academic Team, 2019-20 Mary Garber Award as the Atlantic Coast Conference Female Athlete of the Year
  - 2018: At UNC, Preseason All-ACC Team, First-Team All-ACC, ACC Rookie of the Year, ACC Offensive Player of the Year, ACC Champion, ACC All-Tournament Team, NCAA Division I National Champion, All-South Region First Team, First-Team All-America
  - 2018: Series against The Netherlands (Palo Alto, Calif.), Series against Canada (Chula Vista, Calif.), Series against Chile (Lancaster, Pa.), Series against Argentina (Tucuman, Argentina), Series against Belgium (Lancaster, Pa.)
  - 2017: Named to the U.S. Women's National, The Hawke's Bay Cup (4th, Hawke's Bay, New Zealand), Recorded first cap on March 31 against Australia, Series against Ireland (Lancaster, Pa.)
  - 2016: Named to the U.S. U-21 Women's National Team
  - 2015: Named to the U.S. U-19 Women's National Team, Belgium Tour
  - 2014: Indoor Series against Canada
  - 2013: Series against Canada
  - 2013-14: Member of the U.S. Women's National Indoor Team (Germany, Canada and Argentina Tours)

== International goals ==
No.	Date	Venue	Opponent	Score	Result	Competition
1.	11 August 2017	Lancaster, United States	Chile	2–2	3–4	2017 Women's Pan American Cup
2.	17 November 2017	Auckland, New Zealand	South Korea	1–0	1–1	2016–17 Women's FIH Hockey World League Final
3.	29 July 2019	Lima, Peru	Mexico	4–0	5–0	2019 Pan American Games
4.	31 July 2019	Lima, Peru	Chile	1–2	4–2	2019 Pan American Games
5.	2 August 2019	Lima, Peru	Peru	3–0	8–0	2019 Pan American Games
6.	9 August 2019	Lima, Peru	Chile	2–1	5–1	2019 Pan American Games
7.	9 August 2019	Lima, Peru	Chile	4–1	5–1	2019 Pan American Games
8.	9 August 2019	Lima, Peru	Chile	5–1	5–1	2019 Pan American Games

== Head coaching record ==
Record table
Season	Team	Overall	Conference	Standing	Postseason
North Carolina Tar Heels (Atlantic Coast Conference) (2023–present)
2023	North Carolina	18–3	5–1	T–1st	NCAA Champions
2024	North Carolina	20–1	8–0	1st	NCAA Final Four
2025	North Carolina	21–2	7-1	T-1st	NCAA Final Four
North Carolina:		59–6	20–2		
Total:		59–6			
National champion Postseason invitational champion Conference regular season champion Conference regular season and conference tournament champion Division regular season champion Division regular season and conference tournament champion Conference tournament champion

== Personal life ==
Matson was in a relationship with Major League Baseball pitcher Ben Casparius.
