= Martina Navarro =

Argentine field hockey and indoor hockey player (born 2004)

Personal information
- Born: 3 May 2004 (age 22) Ushuaia, Tierra del Fuego, Argentina

Sport
- Sport: Field hockey
- Position: Forward
Senior career
Years	Team	Caps	Goals
–	Los Ñires	-	-
2024–2025	Gaziantep Polisgücü	-	-
National team
Years	Team	Caps	Goals
2022–	Argentina		-
Medal record
Women's Indoor hockey
Representing Argentina
Women's Indoor Pan American Cup
Silver medal – second place	2024 Calgary	Team

Martina Navarro (born 3 May 2004) is an Argentine professional indoor hockey forward who is a member of the Argentina national team, and last played for the Turkish club Gaziantep Polisgücü SK in 2025.

== Club career ==
Navarro started her career at Los Ñires Hockey Club in Ushuaia. She was named the Best Player of the Final at the 2022 Argentina Women's Hockey National Tournament.

In February 2024, she moved to Turkey, and joined the Turkish Women's Field Hockey Super League club Gaziantep Polisgücü SK. She took part at the 2024 Women's EuroHockey Indoor Club Cup in Alanya, Turkey for Gaziantep Polisgücü SK, and scored six goals. She won the silver medal in the European Club Cup.

== International career ==
In 2022, Navarro was included in the Argentina national team, nicknamed "Las Leonas".

She played at the 2024 Women's Indoor Pan American Cup in Calgary, Canada, and scored six goals. She won the silver medal in the Pan American Cup.

== Personal life ==
Born on 3 May 2005, Martina Navarro is a native of Ushuaia, Tierra del Fuego, Argentina.

She studies and plays in Mar del Plata, Buenos Aires Province.

== Honours ==
=== Club ===
Gaziantep Polisgücü SK

Women's EuroHockey Indoor Club Cup
(silver) (1) 2024

=== International ===
Argentina indoor

Women's Indoor Pan American Cup
(silver) (1): 2024

=== Individual ===
- Best Player of the Final: 2022 Argentina Women's Hockey National Tournament
