= Abant İzzet Baysal University SK (women's hockey) =

- Full name: AIBU HighWay Outlet Women's Hockey
- Founded: 2007; 19 years ago

Personnel
- Captain: Ayla Esen
- Manager: Yasin Yükseler

The Abant İzzet Baysal University Women's Hockey, a.k.a. AIBU HighWay Outlet Women's Hockey Team (Turkish: AİBÜ HighWay Outlet Bayan Hokey Takımı) is a Turkish women's field hockey side of the Abant İzzet Baysal University's sport club in Abant, Bolu Province, Turkey. The team is currently sponsored by "Bolu Dağı" company's shopping mall "HighWay Outlet AVM", and coached by Yasin Yükseler, who founded the team in 2007.

The team participated at the 2013 Eurohockey Women's Indoor Club Challenge I held on February 22–24, 2013 in Lisbon, Portugal and became undefeated champion. Team member Perihan Küçükkoç was named the Most Valuable Player of the tournament while Nurhan Çınar became the Top Scorer.

The women's team competes in the newly established Turkish Intercollegiate Hockey Championship (Turkish: Türkiye Üniversiteler Arası Hokey Şampiyonası). They won the 2012-13 Championship held on April 4–7, 2013 at the Abant İzzet Baysal University.

== Squad ==
Burcu Öztekin, Kübra Güzelal, Ceren Başer, Özge Çalayır, Burcu Ertan, Dilek Aksoy, Serap Yörükoğlu, Perihan Küçükkoç, Nurhan Çınar, Ayla Esen (captain), Çağla Sungu, Ümran Akın.
