= Elise Wong =

Spanish field hockey player

Personal information
- Full name: Elise Michaela Vu Wong
- Born: 21 January 1998 (age 28) North Vancouver, British Columbia, Canada

Sport
- Sport: Field hockey
- Position: Midfield
National team
Years	Team	Caps	Goals
2019–	Canada	51	(7)
2020–	Canada Indoor	19	(6)
Medal record
Women's field hockey
Representing Canada
Pan American Games
Silver medal – second place	2019 Lima	Team
Pan American Cup
Bronze medal – third place	2022 Santiago	Team
FIH Hockey Series
Silver medal – second place	2018–19 Valencia	Team
Women's indoor hockey
Indoor Pan American Cup
Silver medal – second place	2021 Spring City	Team

Elise Michaela Vu Wong (born 21 January 1998) is a field and indoor hockey player from Canada.

== Personal life ==
Elise Wong was born and raised in North Vancouver.

She studied at Princeton University.

== Field hockey ==
Wong made her senior international debut in 2019. She earned her first caps during a test series against China in Panzhihua. She continued to represent the national team throughout 2019, winning silver medals at the Pan American Games in Lima, as well as the FIH Series Finals in Valencia.

In 2022 she was a member of Canada's historic bronze medal winning team at the Pan American Cup in Santiago. The bronze medal secured Canada's qualification to the FIH World Cup for the first time in 28 years. Wong went on to compete at the FIH World Cup held in Terrassa and Amsterdam, with the squad ultimately finishing in last place.

She competed at the 2023 Pan American Games in Santiago.

=== International goals ===
Goal	Date	Location	Opponent	Score	Result	Competition	Ref.
1	21 June 2019	Estadio Beteró, Valencia, Spain	Namibia	8–0	17–0	2018–19 FIH Series Finals	
2	26 November 2021	United States Olympic Training Center, Chula Vista, United States	United States	1–0	2–0	Test Match	
3	27 November 2021	United States Olympic Training Center, Chula Vista, United States	United States	1–0	1–0	Test Match	
4	19 January 2022	Prince of Wales Country Club, Santiago, Chile	Peru	2–0	14–0	2022 Pan American Cup	
5	19 January 2022	Prince of Wales Country Club, Santiago, Chile	Peru	7–0	14–0	2022 Pan American Cup	
6	23 January 2022	Prince of Wales Country Club, Santiago, Chile	Trinidad and Tobago	1–0	13–0	2022 Pan American Cup	
7	25 January 2022	Prince of Wales Country Club, Santiago, Chile	Uruguay	1–0	1–1	2022 Pan American Cup	

== Indoor hockey ==
Wong made her indoor hockey debut in 2020.

She has competed in two Indoor Pan American Cups, in 2021 and 2024, winning silver at the former in Spring City. She also competed at the 2023 FIH Indoor World Cup in Pretoria.
