= 2021 UConn Huskies baseball team =

Baseball team season

2021 UConn Huskies baseball

Big East Regular season champions Big East tournament champions

NCAA South Bend Regional, 1–2
- Conference: Big East Conference
- Record: 34–19 (13–4 Big East)
- Head coach: Jim Penders (18th season)
- Assistant coaches: Jeff Hourigan (10th season); Joshua McDonald (10th season); Chris Podeszwa (18th season)
- Home stadium: Elliot Ballpark

2021 Big East Conference baseball standings
	Conf.				Overall
Team	W		L	PCT	W		L	PCT
UConn ‍†‍‡‍^{y}	13	–	4	.765	34	–	19	.642
Creighton ‍‍‍	15	–	6	.714	24	–	15	.615
Seton Hall ‍‍‍	16	–	11	.593	23	–	25	.479
Xavier ‍‍‍	15	–	11	.577	28	–	26	.519
Villanova ‍‍‍	9	–	12	.429	21	–	14	.600
St. John's ‍‍‍	10	–	16	.385	19	–	21	.475
Butler ‍‍‍	8	–	13	.381	14	–	23	.378
Georgetown ‍‍‍	6	–	19	.240	6	–	25	.194
† – Conference champion ‡ – Tournament champion y – Invited to the NCAA tournament As of June 6, 2021; Rankings from D1Baseball

The 2021 UConn Huskies baseball team represented the University of Connecticut in the 2021 NCAA Division I baseball season. The Huskies played their home games at Elliot Ballpark, their brand new stadium on campus in Storrs, Connecticut. The team is coached by Jim Penders, in his 18th season at UConn. The Huskies played their first season back in the Big East Conference, having departed the American Athletic Conference. They finished in first place with a 13–4 record, won the Big East tournament for the 4th time in program history, and made their 22nd appearance in an NCAA Regional.

== Previous season ==
The Huskies posted an overall record of 8–5 in the COVID-19-shortened 2020 season. The season was canceled before they could open Elliot Ballpark, and so will inaugurate it in 2021.

== Personnel ==
=== Roster ===
2021 Connecticut Huskies roster
Pitchers: 5 – Ben Casparius – Junior; 10 – Colby Dunlop – Junior; 15 – Hector Alejandro – Freshman; 20 – Brendan O'Donnell – Freshman; 21 – Reggie Crawford – Freshman; 23 – Sam Favieri – Freshman; 24 – Caleb Wurster – (redshirt) Sophomore; 25 – Joe Simeone – Junior; 31 – Jimmy Wang – (redshirt) Sophomore; 34 – Randy Polonia – Senior; 36 – Justin Willis – Junior; 37 – Kenny Campbell – (redshirt) Junior; 38 – Garrett Coe – Freshman; 39 – Bobby McBride – Freshman; 40 – Angus Mayock – (redshirt) Sophomore; 42 – Pat Gallagher – Freshman; 45 – Kenneth Haus – Senior; 46 – Andrew Marrero – Freshman; 47 – Erik Stock – Junior; 49 – Austin Peterson – Junior; 50 – Devin Kirby – Junior; – Mason Kolean – (redshirt) Freshman; – Leo Socci – Freshman	Catchers: 2 – Ryan Hyde – Freshman; 32 – Ciaran Devenney – Graduate Student; 43 – Pat Winkel – Sophomore; 44 – David Christoforo – Freshman; – Matt Donlan – (redshirt) Sophomore; Outfielders: 3 – Kyler Fedko – Sophomore; 4 – Korey Morton – Freshman; 12 – Kevin Ferrer – (redshirt) Freshman; 22 – Ben Maycock – (redshirt) Junior; 26 – T.C. Simmons – (redshirt) Sophomore	Infielders: 1 – Bryan Padilla – Freshman; 6 – Andy Hague – (redshirt) Sophomore; 7 – Christian Fedko – Junior; 8 – Zach Bushling – Junior; 11 – Chris Winkel – Senior; 13 – Phoenix Billings – Freshman; 19 – Will Lucas – Sophomore; 27 – Todd Petersen – Freshman; 30 – Chris Brown – Freshman; 41 – David Langer – Senior; – David Smith – (redshirt) Freshman

=== Coaches ===
2021 Connecticut Huskies baseball coaching staff
- 16 – Jim Penders – Head coach – 18th season
- 29 – Jeff Hourigan – Assistant coach/recruiting coordinator – 10th season
- 33 – Joshua MacDonald – Assistant coach – 10th season
- 14 – Chris Podeszwa – Volunteer assistant coach – 18th season

== Schedule ==
Legend
	UConn win
	UConn loss
	Cancellation
**Bold**	UConn team member
*	Non-Conference game

2021 Connecticut Huskies baseball game log
Regular season

February
Date	Opponent	Rank	Site/stadium	Score	Win	Loss	Save	Attendance	Overall record	BE Record
Feb 19	at No. 16 Virginia*		Davenport Field • Charlottesville, VA	**L** 1–2	Abbott (1–0)	**Casparius (0–1)**	Schoch (1)	250	0–1	
Feb 20	at No. 16 Virginia*		Davenport Field • Charlottesville, VA	**W** 10–9	**Wurster (1–0)**	Whitten (0–1)	None	250	1–1	
Feb 21	at No. 16 Virginia*		Davenport Field • Charlottesville, VA	**L** 2–4	Vasil (1–0)	**Wang (0–1)**	Schoch (2)	250	1–2	
Feb 26	at Southern Miss*		Pete Taylor Park • Hattiesburg, MS	**L** 5–6	Och (1–0)	**Haus (0–1)**	Ramsey (1)		1–3	
Feb 27	at Southern Miss*		Pete Taylor Park • Hattiesburg, MS	**L** 6–7	Gillentine (1–0)	Simeone (0–1)	Ramsey (2)		1–4	
Feb 28	at Southern Miss*		Pete Taylor Park • Hattiesburg, MS	**W** 10–7	**Peterson (1–0)**	Powell (0–1)	None		2–4	

March
Date	Opponent	Rank	Site/stadium	Score	Win	Loss	Save	Attendance	Overall record	BE Record
Mar 5	vs Miami (OH)*		Springs Brooks Stadium • Conway, SC (Baseball at the Beach)	**W** 5–0	**Casparius (1–1)**	Egbert (1–1)	None	1,000	3–4	
Mar 6	vs Davidson*		Springs Brooks Stadium • Conway, SC (Baseball at the Beach)	**L** 3–4	Hely (2–0)	**Haus (0–1)**	Devos (2)	1,000	3–5	
Mar 7	at Coastal Carolina*		Springs Brooks Stadium • Conway, SC (Baseball at the Beach)	**W** 5–4^{12}	**Wurster (2–0)**	Barrow (0–1)	None	1,000	4–5	
Mar 8	at Coastal Carolina*		Springs Brooks Stadium • Conway, SC (Baseball at the Beach)	**L** 10–12	Maniscalo (1–0)	**Gallagher (0–1)**	Abney (3)	1,000	4–6	
Mar 12	at No. 9 Texas Tech*		Dan Law Field at Rip Griffin Park • Lubbock, TX	**L** 3–4	Birdsell (2–0)	**Casparius (1–2)**	Queen (2)	3,031	4–7	
Mar 13	at No. 9 Texas Tech*		Dan Law Field at Rip Griffin Park • Lubbock, TX	**L** 3–10	Monteverde (3–0)	**Simeone (0–2)**	None	3,538	4–8	
Mar 14	at No. 9 Texas Tech*		Dan Law Field at Rip Griffin Park • Lubbock, TX	**L** 13–15	Sublette (2–0)	**Peterson (1–1)**	Queen (3)	3,378	4–9	
Mar 15	at No. 7 Texas Tech*		Dan Law Field at Rip Griffin Park • Lubbock, TX	**L** 8–9^{10}	Girton (1–0)	**Wurster (2–1)**	None	2,782	4–10	
Mar 19	at St. Joseph's*		Smithson Field • Merion Station, PA	**W** 6–4	**Casparius (2–2)**	McCole (0–1)	**Wurster (1)**	214	5–10	
Mar 20	at St. Joseph's*		Smithson Field • Merion Station, PA	**L** 8–9	Zimmerman (1–0)	**Simeone (0–3)**	Weber (1)	103	5–11	
Mar 21	at St. Joseph's*		Smithson Field • Merion Station, PA	**W** 13–0	**Peterson (2–1)**	Devine (0–1)	None	355	6–11	
Mar 23	Central Connecticut*		Elliot Ballpark • Storrs, CT	**W** 2–0	**Gallagher (1–0)**	Stephens (0–1)	**Wurster (1)**	254	7–11	
Mar 26	Rhode Island*		Elliot Ballpark • Storrs, CT	**W** 9–6	**Haus (1–2)**	Brutti (0–1)	**Wurster (3)**	176	8–11	
Mar 27	Rhode Island*		Elliot Ballpark • Storrs, CT	**W** 3–2^{13}	**Willis (1–0)**	Fernandez (2–1)	None		9–11	
Mar 28	Rhode Island*		Elliot Ballpark • Storrs, CT	**L** 4–6	Levesque (1–1)	**Dunlop (0–1)**	None	213	9–12	
Mar 30	Boston College*		Elliot Ballpark • Storrs, CT	**W** 12–0	**Gallagher (2–1)**	Campbell (0–1)	None	279	10–12	

April
Date	Opponent	Rank	Site/stadium	Score	Win	Loss	Save	Attendance	Overall record	BE Record
Apr 1	UMass*		Elliot Ballpark • Storrs, CT	**W** 9–2	**Casparius (3–2)**	Steele (2–3)	None	111	11–12	
Apr 2	UMass*		Elliot Ballpark • Storrs, CT	**W** 11–1^{8}	**Peterson (3–1)**	Given (1–1)	None	176	12–12	
Apr 3	UMass*		Elliot Ballpark • Storrs, CT	**W** 7–3	**Simeone (1–3)**	Livnat (1–1)	None	211	13–12	
Apr 6	Bryant*		Elliot Ballpark • Storrs, CT	**W** 9–8	**Willis (2–0)**	Harrigan (0–1)	**Crawford (1)**	212	14–12	
Apr 9	Georgetown		Elliot Ballpark • Storrs, CT	**W** 10–0	**Casparius (4–0)**	Tonas (0–1)	None	256	15–12	1–0
Apr 10	Georgetown		Elliot Ballpark • Storrs, CT	**W** 6–0	**Peterson (4–1)**	DeRoche (0–1)	None	212	16–12	2–0
Apr 10	Georgetown		Elliot Ballpark • Storrs, CT	Cancelled due to COVID-19 protocols						
Apr 11	Georgetown		Elliot Ballpark • Storrs, CT	Cancelled due to COVID-19 protocols						
Apr 13	at Bryant*		Conaty Park • Smithfield, RI	Cancelled due to COVID-19 protocols						
Apr 16	at Creighton		TD Ameritrade Park • Omaha, NE	Cancelled due to COVID-19 protocols						
Apr 17	at Creighton		TD Ameritrade Park • Omaha, NE	Cancelled due to COVID-19 protocols						
Apr 17	at Creighton		TD Ameritrade Park • Omaha, NE	Cancelled due to COVID-19 protocols						
Apr 18	at Creighton		TD Ameritrade Park • Omaha, NE	Cancelled due to COVID-19 protocols						
Apr 25	at Xavier		J. Page Hayden Field • Cincinnati, OH	**L** 0–5^{7}	Zwack (4–3)	**Casparius (4–3)**	None	120	16–13	2–1
Apr 25	at Xavier		J. Page Hayden Field • Cincinnati, OH	**W** 8–5	**Peterson (5–1)**	Flamm (2–3)	**Wurster (4)**	120	17–13	3–1
Apr 26	at Xavier		J. Page Hayden Field • Cincinnati, OH	**W** 15–13^{12}	**Wurster (3–1)**	Olson (3–2)	**Haus (1)**	132	18–13	4–1
Apr 27	at Xavier		J. Page Hayden Field • Cincinnati, OH	**L** 5–6	Czabala (1–0)	**Crawford (0–1)**	None	165	19–13	4–2
Apr 27	at Boston College*		Eddie Pellagrini Diamond • Brighton, MA	Cancelled						
Apr 30	Butler		Elliot Ballpark • Storrs, CT	Cancelled due to COVID-19 protocols						

May
Date	Opponent	Rank	Site/stadium	Score	Win	Loss	Save	Attendance	Overall record	BE Record
May 1	Butler		Elliot Ballpark • Storrs, CT	Cancelled due to COVID-19 protocols						
May 1	Butler		Elliot Ballpark • Storrs, CT	Cancelled due to COVID-19 protocols						
May 1	Bucknell*		Elliot Ballpark • Storrs, CT	**W** 9–1	**Casparius (3–1)**	Greer (3–4)	None	215	19–14	
May 2	Bucknell*		Elliot Ballpark • Storrs, CT	**W** 13–6	**Haus (2–2)**	Difiore (4–3)	None	271	20–14	
May 2	Butler		Elliot Ballpark • Storrs, CT	Cancelled due to COVID-19 protocols						
May 7	at St. John's		Jack Kaiser Stadium • Queens, NY	**W** 4–3	**Peterson (6–1)**	Rodriguez (2–2)	**Wurster (5)**	200	21–14	5–2
May 8	at St. John's		Jack Kaiser Stadium • Queens, NY	**L** 3–4^{7}	Semon (1–0)	**Casparius (5–4)**	Routzahn (6)	200	21–15	5–3
May 8	at St. John's		Jack Kaiser Stadium • Queens, NY	**W** 6–0	**Gallagher (3–1)**	Hendry (2–3)	None	200	22–15	6–3
May 9	at St. John's		Jack Kaiser Stadium • Queens, NY	**W** 5–3^{10}	**Wurster (4–1)**	Routzahn (2–1)	None	200	23–15	7–3
May 11	at Northeastern*		Parsons Field • Brookline, MA	Cancelled						
May 14	at Villanova		Villanova Ballpark at Plymouth • Plymouth Meeting, PA	**L** 2–3	Graceffo (7–2)	**Marrero (0–1)**	Kingsbury (4)	50	23–16	7–4
May 15	at Villanova		Villanova Ballpark at Plymouth • Plymouth Meeting, PA	**W** 9–4	**Casparius (7–4)**	Arella (2–4)	**Willis (1)**	50	24–16	8–4
May 16	at Villanova		Villanova Ballpark at Plymouth • Plymouth Meeting, PA	**W** 4–3	**Gallagher (4–1)**	Wilkinson (2–0)	**Wurster (6)**	60	25–16	9–4
May 18	at Rhode Island*		Bill Beck Field • Kingston, RI	**W** 15–6	**Crawford (1–1)**	Diaz (0–2)	None	50	26–16	
May 20	Seton Hall		Elliot Ballpark • Storrs, CT	**W** 11–4	**Haus (3–2)**	Payero (4–2)	None	345	27–16	10–4
May 21	Seton Hall		Elliot Ballpark • Storrs, CT	**W** 15–1	**Casparius (7–4)**	Festa (6–3)	None	419	28–16	11–4
May 21	Seton Hall		Elliot Ballpark • Storrs, CT	**W** 12–4	**Gallagher (5–1)**	Cinnella (3–3)	None	475	29–19	12–4
May 22	Seton Hall		Elliot Ballpark • Storrs, CT	**W** 10–2	**Willis (3–0)**	Burnham (3–5)	**Wurster (7)**		30–19	13–4

Postseason

Big East Tournament
Date	Opponent	Rank	Site/stadium	Score	Win	Loss	Save	Attendance	Overall record	BET Record
May 27	(4) Xavier	(1)	Prasco Park • Mason, OH	**W** 11–1	**Peterson (7–1)**	Zwack (6–5)	**Coe (1)**	2,500	31–16	1–0
May 28	(2) Creighton	(1)	Prasco Park • Mason, OH	**W** 2–0	**Casparius (8–4)**	Smith (6–5)	**Wurster (8)**		32–16	2–0
May 27	(4) Xavier	(1)	Prasco Park • Mason, OH	**L** 4–5	Olson (5–3)	**Haus (3–3)**	Zwack (1)	1,500	32–17	2–1
May 27	(4) Xavier	(1)	Prasco Park • Mason, OH	**W** 10–6	**Willis (4–0)**	Lynch (0–3)	**Wurster (9)**	1,500	33–17	3–1

NCAA South Bend Regional
Date	Opponent	Rank	Site/stadium	Score	Win	Loss	Save	Attendance	Overall record	Reg Record
June 4	(3) Michigan	(2)	Frank Eck Stadium • Notre Dame, IN	**W** 6–1	**Polonia (1–0)**	Hajjar (4–2)	None	1,825	34–17	1–0
June 5	(1) Notre Dame	(2)	Frank Eck Stadium • Notre Dame, IN	**L** 3–26	Mercer (4–2)	**Casparius (8–5)**	None	1,825	34–18	1–1
June 6	(4) Central Michigan	(2)	Frank Eck Stadium • Notre Dame, IN	**L** 9–14	Navarra (6–0)	**Gallagher (5–2)**	None	1,825	34–19	1–2

Rankings from D1Baseball. Parentheses indicate tournament seedings.
