= Gaziantep Polisgücü SK (women's hockey) =

Turkish women's hockey team

- League: TurkishWomen's Field Hockey Super League; Turkish Women's Indoor Hockey Super League

Active departments of Gaziantep Polisgücü SK
Football	Handball
Hockey (M, W)	Shooting

The Gaziantep Polisgücü SK Women's Hockey (Turkish: Gaziantep Polisgücü Spor Kulübü Derneği Kadın Hokey Takımı) is a Turkish women's field hockey and indoor hockey side of the Gaziantep Polisgücü SK based in Gaziantep, and sponsored by the Gaziantep Police Directorate. They play in the Turkish Women's Field Hockey Super League (THF Kadınlar Açık Saha Hokey Süper Ligi) and Turkish Women's Indoor Hockey Super League (THF Kadınlar Salon Hokeyi Süper Ligi).

== Current squad ==
As of 2025–26.

Head coach: (Turkey) Yusuf Kasım

No.	Pos.	Nation	Player
1		TUR	Kevser Deniz Parlak
2		TUR	Merve Yıldız
3		TUR	Meryem Oymak
4		TUR	Yağmur Canavar
6		TUR	Esma Hüsne İdik
7		TUR	Aysun Epengin
8		TUR	Ebru Çınar
9	FW	TUR	Fatma Songül Gültekin
10		TUR	Ece Şahiner

No.	Pos.	Nation	Player
11		TUR	Gamze Zor
12		TUR	Berfin Epengin
13		TUR	Damla Kutluca
15		TUR	Nurhan Gül
16		RUS	Anna Ryabova
17		TUR	Hatice Uzunkol
18	FW	TUR	Perihan Çınar (C)
28		TUR	Ayşe Güven
31		TUR	Buse Badur

== Former notable players ==
Argentina

- Victoria Amaya
- Martina Navarro

Turkey

- Nurhan Çınar
- Leyla Öztürk

== International participations ==
As of April 2026.

=== Indoor hockey ===
Year	Host	Competition	Result
2020	LTU, Šiauliai	EuroHockey Indoor Club Trophy	4th
2022	TUR, Alanya	EuroHockey Indoor Club Trophy	1st place, gold medalist(s)

=== Field hockey ===
Year	Host	Competition	Result
2018	AUT, Vienna	EuroHockey Club Challenge III	1st place, gold medalist(s)
2019	UKR, Boryspil	EuroHockey Club Challenge III	5th
2021	CRO, Sveti Ivan Zelina	EuroHockey Club Challenge III	1st place, gold medalist(s)
2022	TUR Alanya	EuroHockey Club Challenge II	3rd place, bronze medalist(s)
2023	TUR Alanya	EuroHockey Club Challenge I	3rd place, bronze medalist(s)
2024	TUR Alanya	EuroHockey Club Trophy II	2nd place, silver medalist(s)

== Achievements ==
=== Field hockey ===
Turkish Women's Field Hockey Super League

- (gold) (7): 2018–19, 2020–21, 2021–22, 2022–23, 2023–24, 2024–25, 2025–26,

=== Indoor hockey ===
Turkish Women's Indoor Hockey Super League

- (gold) (5): 2018–19, 2019–20, 2020–21, 2022–23, 2025–26
- (silver) (3): 2021–22, 2023–24, 2024–25

Women's EuroHockey Indoor Club Cup in Alanya, Turkey.

- (silver) (1): 2024

== Former squads ==
2024 Women's EuroHockey Indoor Club Cup — Silver Medal

- 1 Fatma Çil (GK), 2 Martina Navarro, 3 Ekaterina Soloveva, 4 Perihan Çınar, 5 Emine Çelik, 6 Ece Şahiner, 7 Yeter Çelik, 9 Fatma Songül Gültekin, 10 Meryem Aydın (C), 12 Şengül Kaya (GK), 16 Victoria Amaya, 18 Burcu Öztekin Coach: (Turkey) Yusuf Kasım.
