= Reese D'Ariano =

American indoor hockey player (born 2009)

Personal information
- Born: 31 January 2009 (age 17) West Chester, Pennsylvania, United States

Sport
- Sport: Field hockey
- Position: Forward
- Club: WC Eagles
National team
Years	Team	Caps	Goals
2023–	United States Indoor	17	(35)
2025–	United States	13	(1)
Medal record
Representing United States
Women's field hockey
Pan American Cup
Silver medal – second place	2025 Montevideo
Pan American Junior Championship
Silver medal – second place	2026 Santiago	Team
Women's indoor hockey
Indoor Pan American Cup
Gold medal – first place	2024 Calgary

Reese D'Ariano (born 31 January 2009) is an indoor and field hockey player from the United States.

== Personal life ==
Reese D'Ariano was born and raised in West Chester, Pennsylvania.

== Career ==
=== Indoor hockey ===
D'Ariano first rose to prominence in 2023 at the FIH Indoor World Cup in Pretoria. During the tournament, she became the youngest player in history to score a goal at an FIH Indoor World Cup, at just 14 years and 6 days old. At the conclusion of the tournament she was presented with the 'Young Player of the Tournament' award for her outstanding performances.

In 2024 she won her first medal with the United States indoor squad, taking home gold at the Indoor Pan American Cup in Calgary. She was again recognised for her excellent performances, and was presented with the 'Player of the Tournament' award.

At the beginning of 2025, D'Ariano was selected in her second FIH Indoor World Cup squad. She travelled with the team to Poreč, helping the United States to their best ever performance at an FIH Indoor World Cup, finishing in seventh place. She was also presented the 'Young Player of the Tournament' award for the second consecutive time.

=== Field hockey ===
Following her outstanding indoor performances, D'Ariano received her first call–up to the United States field hockey squad in 2025.
