= Keçiören Bağlumspor (women's hockey) =

Keçiören Bağlum SK
- League: Turkish Field Hockey Women's Super League

Personnel
- Manager: Mustafa Çakır

The Keçiören Bağlumspor is a Turkish women's field hockey side of Keçiören Bağlum SK based in Bağlum neighborhood of Keçiören district in Ankara, Turkey. It is sponsored by the Keçiören Municipality. The team plays in the Turkish Field Hockey Women's Super League (Turkish: Türkiye Kadınlar Açık Alan Hokey Süper Ligi) and is coached by Mustafa Çakır.

The team won the 2012 Turkish League, and qualified so for the participation at the 2013 Eurohockey Women’s Club Champions Challenge III held on May 17–20, 2013 in Porto, Portugal. They won all the four matches, and became champion of the division. The team is promoted to one higher division for the next year's championship. Team member Nurhan Çınar was named tournament's Top Scorer.
