= 2021 Big East Conference baseball tournament =

American college baseball tournament

- Teams: 4
- Format: Double-elimination tournament
- Finals site: Prasco Park; Mason, Ohio
- Champions: UConn (4th title)
- Winning coach: Jim Penders (2nd title)
- MVP: Kyler Fedko (UConn)
- Television: Big East DN; FS2 (final)

2021 Big East Conference baseball standings
	Conf.				Overall
Team	W		L	PCT	W		L	PCT
UConn ‍†‍‡‍^{y}	13	–	4	.765	34	–	19	.642
Creighton ‍‍‍	15	–	6	.714	24	–	15	.615
Seton Hall ‍‍‍	16	–	11	.593	23	–	25	.479
Xavier ‍‍‍	15	–	11	.577	28	–	26	.519
Villanova ‍‍‍	9	–	12	.429	21	–	14	.600
St. John's ‍‍‍	10	–	16	.385	19	–	21	.475
Butler ‍‍‍	8	–	13	.381	14	–	23	.378
Georgetown ‍‍‍	6	–	19	.240	6	–	25	.194
† – Conference champion ‡ – Tournament champion y – Invited to the NCAA tournament As of June 6, 2021; Rankings from D1Baseball

The 2021 Big East Conference baseball tournament was held at Prasco Park in Mason, Ohio, from May 27 through 30. The event, held at the end of the conference regular season, determined the champion of the Big East Conference for the 2021 season. The winner of the double-elimination tournament received the conference's automatic bid to the 2021 NCAA Division I baseball tournament.

== Format and seeding ==
The tournament will use a double-elimination format and feature the top four finishers of the Big East's eight teams. They will be seeded by conference winning percentage.

Team	W	L	Pct.	GB	Seed
UConn	13	4	.765	—	1
Creighton	15	6	.714	—	2
Seton Hall	16	11	.593	2	3
Xavier	15	11	.577	3	4
Villanova	9	12	.429	6	—
St. John's	10	16	.385	6.5	—
Butler	8	13	.381	7	—
Georgetown	6	19	.240	11	—

== Bracket ==
First round
1	UConn	11
4	Xavier	1
3	Seton Hall	7
2	Creighton	8
Lower round 1
4	Xavier	4
3	Seton Hall	2

Semi-finals
1	UConn	2
2	Creighton	0
Lower final
2	Creighton	1
4	Xavier	2

Finals
1	UConn	10
4	Xavier	6

== Game results ==
Date	Game	Winner	Score	Loser	Notes
May 27	Game 1	(2) Creighton	8–7	(3) Seton Hall	
May 27	Game 2	(1) UConn	11–1	(4) Xavier	
May 28	Game 3	(4) Xavier	4–2	(3) Seton Hall	Seton Hall eliminated
May 29	Game 4	(1) UConn	2–0	(2) Creighton	
May 29	Game 5	(4) Xavier	2–1	(2) Creighton	Creighton eliminated
May 30	Game 6	(4) Xavier	5–4	(1) UConn	
May 30	Game 7	(1) UConn	10–6	(4) Xavier	Xavier eliminated
