= Karen Shelton =

American field hockey player (born 1957)

Personal information
- Full name: Karen Christina Shelton
- Born: November 14, 1957 (age 68) Honolulu, Hawaii, U.S.
Medal record
Women's Field Hockey
Representing the United States
Olympic Games
Bronze medal – third place	1984 Los Angeles	Team competition

Karen Christina Shelton (born November 14, 1957) is an American former field hockey player and coach. Shelton served as head coach of the University of North Carolina's field hockey program from 1981 until her retirement in 2022. She was a member of the U.S. National Team from 1977 to 1984 and a starter on the team that won the bronze medal at the 1984 Summer Olympics in Los Angeles, California. She attended West Chester State (now West Chester University) and was a member of four NCAA championship winning teams (three in field hockey, one in lacrosse). Shelton also qualified for the 1980 Olympic team but did not compete due to the Olympic Committee's boycott of the 1980 Summer Olympics in Moscow, Russia. As consolation, she was one of 461 athletes to receive a Congressional Gold Medal many years later.

== Playing career ==
While at West Chester State, Shelton won the Honda Award (now the Honda Sports Award) as the nation's best field hockey player three consecutive years, 1976–77, 1977–78, and 1978–79, a streak that has never been equaled. Shelton also played on the women's lacrosse team.

== Career at North Carolina ==
Shelton was the head coach at the University of North Carolina at Chapel Hill from 1981 until 2022. She led the Tar Heels to ten NCAA Championships, 25 Atlantic Coast Conference championships, and winning records in 41 out of 42 seasons at the helm. She coached the team to 5 perfect seasons en route to the national championship in those years (1995, 24-0 record; 2007, 24-0 record; 2018, 23-0 record; 2019, 23-0 record; 2022, 21-0 record). The Tar Heels also finished as runner up in the national championships 11 times under Shelton.

When Shelton began coaching the Tar Heels, she was a part-time employee, as she continued her playing career with the U.S. national team. After leading the team to the NCAA National Championship in 1989, she became a full-time employee.

In 2018, construction was completed and the new UNC field hockey stadium, Karen Shelton Stadium, was named after Shelton. In the first two seasons playing in KSS, the Tar Heels went undefeated both at home and overall, with a win-streak of 46-0 for 2018 and 2019.

Shelton became the second Tar Heel coach, after Dean Smith, and first female coach, to work in a UNC campus facility named after them. In 2019, UNC women's soccer coach Anson Dorrance joined Smith and Shelton in this exclusive club with the opening of a new soccer and lacrosse stadium, named Dorrance Field. Shelton cites Smith and Dorrance as coaches she learned the most from, particularly Dorrance, as he set the bar early for women's athletics.

== Highlights ==
- U.S. National Team member (1977–84)
- Three-time winner of the Honda Award (now the Honda Sports Award), in 1976–77, 1977–78, and 1978–79
- Member of the 1980 and 1984 U.S. Woman's Olympic Field Hockey team.
- U.S. Olympic bronze medalist in field hockey (1984)
- U.S. Field Hockey Athlete of the Year (1983)
- Head coach at UNC Chapel Hill (1981–2022)
- Record of 692-164-9 in 39 seasons*
- Five-time National Coach of the Year (1994,’95,’96,’07,'09)
- Ten-time ACC Coach of the Year (1986, 1987, 1988, 1989, 1994, 2000, 2004, 2007, 2015, and 2018). Shelton has won the honor more times than any coach in league history.
- UNC Field Hockey NCAA National Championships with Shelton coaching: 10 (1989, 1995, 1996, 1997, 2007, 2009, 2018, 2019, 2020, 2022)
- UNC Field Hockey ACC Championships with Shelton coaching: 25
- NCAA appearances with Shelton coaching: 25
- NCAA Final Four appearances with Shelton coaching: 14
- Ranks second in Division 1 history in both career wins and championships won.
- Inducted to the NFHCA Hall of Fame (for coaching accomplishments – inducted in 2008)
- Inducted to the U.S. Field Hockey Association Hall of Fame (for player accomplishments – inducted in 1989)
- Inducted to the North Carolina Sports Hall of Fame in Jan. 2010 (first field hockey player or coach inducted)
- Delaware County** Field Hockey Athlete of the Millennium (1999)

Philadelphia, PA metro area**

== Personal life ==
Born Nov. 14, 1957, in Honolulu, Hawaii, Shelton spent the first 10 years of her life on Army bases across the country. She was in fifth grade when her father retired and the family moved to Pennsylvania, the cradle of field hockey.

Shelton earned a bachelor's degree in health and physical education in 1979 from West Chester State, then spent one year as assistant coach at Franklin & Marshall College before coming to UNC.

Shelton has four brothers and two sisters. She is married to Willie Scroggs, who has been a member of the UNC Athletics staff since 1978. Scroggs served as the head coach of the men's lacrosse team for 12 seasons from 1979 to 1990, winning three NCAA Championships and six ACC titles in that span. He also worked in administrative roles at UNC from 1990 until he retired for a second time in 2014. He worked as Assistant A.D. for Operations, then Associate A.D. for Athletic Facilities & Operations, and finally Senior Associate A.D. for Facilities & Operations. Shelton and Scroggs met when their offices were next to each other during a facilities construction project in 1981, and eventually Scroggs asked her out on a date. They married in 1984, and their son, Will, was born in 1990. Will played lacrosse at UNC from 2010 to 2013, and welcomed a daughter with his wife Julia in 2019, making Shelton and Scroggs grandparents.

At the 1984 Olympics, Shelton shared a dorm building in Olympic Village with two other Olympians with UNC ties- Michael Jordan and Sam Perkins.
