= 2023 NCAA Division I field hockey tournament =

2023 NCAA Division I Field Hockey Championship
Tournament details
- Country: United States

Final positions
- Champions: North Carolina (11th title)
- Runners-up: Northwestern (3rd title game)

Tournament statistics
- Matches played: 17
- Goals scored: 61 (3.59 per match)
- Top goal scorer(s): Charly Bruder, North Carolina (4)

Awards
- Best player: Maddie Kahn, North Carolina

The 2023 NCAA Division I Field Hockey Championship was the 43rd annual tournament organized by the NCAA, to determine the national champion of Division I women's college field hockey in the United States.

The semi-finals and championship match were played at the Karen Shelton Stadium at the University of North Carolina at Chapel Hill in Chapel Hill, North Carolina on November 17 and 19, 2023.

== Qualified teams ==
=== Automatic qualifiers ===
| Conference | Champion | Record | Appearance | Last |
|---|---|---|---|---|
| America East | California | 12–7 | 11th | 2006 |
| ACC | North Carolina | 14–3 | 40th | 2022 |
| Atlantic 10 | St. Joseph's | 16–4 | 6th | 2022 |
| Big East | Old Dominion | 14–5 | 32nd | 2013 |
| Big Ten | Northwestern | 18–1 | 19th | 2022 |
| CAA | William & Mary | 11–8 | 4th | 2018 |
| Ivy | Harvard | 15–3 | 8th | 2021 |
| Mid-American | Miami (OH) | 14–7 | 8th | 2022 |
| Northeast | Sacred Heart | 9–10 | 1st | — |
| Patriot | American | 11–7 | 12th | 2021 |

=== At-large qualifiers ===
| Team | Conference | Record | Appearance | Last |
|---|---|---|---|---|
| Duke | ACC | 16–4 | 19th | 2019 |
| Louisville | ACC | 14–6 | 11th | 2022 |
| Syracuse | ACC | 16–6 | 17th | 2022 |
| Virginia | ACC | 12–6 | 27th | 2022 |
| Liberty | Big East | 17–2 | 5th | 2022 |
| Iowa | Big Ten | 13–5 | 28th | 2022 |
| Maryland | Big Ten | 19–4 | 35th | 2022 |
| Rutgers | Big Ten | 16–3 | 5th | 2021 |

== Bracket ==
Opening round November 8, 2023; Campus sites
William & Mary* | 4
Sacred Heart | 0
California* | 0
Miami (OH) | 3

First round November 10, 2023; Campus sites
1 | North Carolina | 6
William & Mary | 1
Rutgers | 1
Harvard | 2
Virginia | 2
St. Joseph's | 1
Old Dominion | 0
4 | Maryland | 3
3 | Duke | 2
American | 1
Syracuse | 1(2)
Liberty | 1(1)
Iowa | 1(1)
Louisville | 1(2)
Miami (OH) | 0
2 | Northwestern | 3

Second round November 12, 2023; Campus sites
1 | North Carolina | 4
Harvard | 2
Virginia | 4
4 | Maryland | 0
3 | Duke | 2
Syracuse | 1
Louisville | 2
2 | Northwestern | 3

Semifinals; November 17, 2023; Chapel Hill, North Carolina; Karen Shelton Stadium
1 | North Carolina | 2
Virginia | 0
3 | Duke | 1
2 | Northwestern | 2

Championship; November 19, 2023; Chapel Hill, North Carolina; Karen Shelton Stadium
1 | North Carolina | 1 (3 PSO)
2 | Northwestern | 1 (2)

== Attendances ==
The five college field hockey teams with the highest average home attendance in 2023:

| # | Club | Average attendance |
|---|---|---|
| 1 | North Carolina Tar Heels field hockey | 1,074 |
| 2 | Maryland Terrapins field hockey | 704 |
| 3 | Michigan Wolverines field hockey | 559 |
| 4 | Rutgers Scarlet Knights field hockey | 501 |
| 5 | Penn State Nittany Lions field hockey | 472 |

== See also ==
- NCAA Division II Field Hockey Championship
- NCAA Division III Field Hockey Championship
