= Bolu Abant İzzet Baysal University =

Public university in Bolu, Turkey

Coordinates: 40.7142°N 31.5128°E

- Bolu Abant İzzet Baysal Üniversitesi
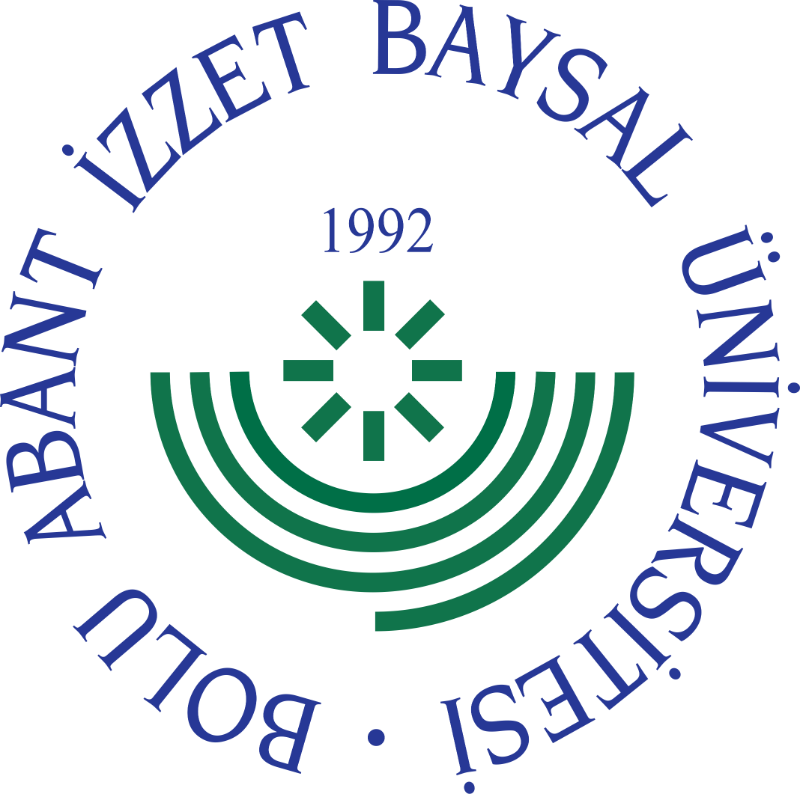
- Type: Foundation-supported state university
- Established: 1992
- President: Prof.Dr. Faruk Yiğit
- Administrative staff: 1539
- Students: 33,080
- Location: Bolu, Turkey
- Colors: Green and Navy
- Affiliations: Erasmus
- Website: www.ibu.edu.tr

University rankings

Regional – Overall
- QS Emerging Europe and Central Asia: 301-350 (2022)

Bolu Abant İzzet Baysal University (Turkish: Bolu Abant İzzet Baysal Üniversitesi) is a public university in Bolu, Turkey. It was founded on 3 July 1992 by İzzet Baysal. It has campuses in the city center and three districts of Bolu (Gerede, Mengen, Mudurnu). The main campus of the university, namely the İzzet Baysal Campus, is located in Gölköy, which is 8 km from the city center. The university comprises 16 faculties, 1 institute, 1 school, 8 vocational schools, and 20 research centers. 1.539 faculty members and 1.176 administrative staff.

== Academics ==
=== Institutes ===
- Institute of Education Sciences
- Institute of Health Sciences
- Institute of Science and Technology
- Institute of Social Sciences

=== Faculties ===
- Faculty of Agriculture and Natural Sciences
- Faculty of Architecture
- Faculty of Communication
- Faculty of Dentistry
- Faculty of Economics and Administrative Sciences
- Faculty of Education
- Faculty of Engineering
- Faculty of Fine Arts
- Faculty of Health Sciences
- Faculty of Law
- Faculty of Medicine
- Faculty of Arts and Sciences
- Faculty of Sports Sciences
- Faculty of Technology
- Faculty of Theology
- Faculty of Tourism

=== Colleges ===
- Gerede in the School of Applied Sciences
- School of Foreign Languages

=== Vocational Schools ===
- Bolu Vocational School
- Bolu Technical Sciences Vocational School
- Gerede Vocational School
- Mehmet Tanrıkulu Health Services Vocational School
- Mengen Vocational School
- Mudurnu Süreyya Astarcı Vocational School
- Seben İzzat Baysal Vocational School
- Yeniçağa Yaşar Çelik Vocational School

== See also ==
- Abant İzzet Baysal University SK (women's hockey)
- List of forestry universities and colleges
