= 2024 Women's EuroHockey Indoor Club Cup =

Indoor hockey tournament in Alanya, Turkey

Tournament details
- Host country: Turkey
- City: Alanya
- Dates: 22–25 February
- Teams: 10 (from 10 associations)
- Venue: Alanya Atatürk Spor Salonu

Final positions
- Champions: (Germany) Düsseldorfer HC (3rd title)
- Runner-up: (Turkey) Gaziantep
- Third place: (Ukraine) Sumchanka

Tournament statistics
- Matches played: 29
- Goals scored: 217 (7.48 per match)
- Top scorer: Mabel Brands (Düsseldorfer HC) (25 goals)
- Best player: Anastasiia Shyshyna (Sumchanka)
- Best goalkeeper: Flurina Steffen (Rotweiss Wettingen)

The 2023 Women's EuroHockey Indoor Club Cup was the 32nd edition of the Women's EuroHockey Indoor Club Cup, Europe's premier indoor hockey club tournament for women organized by the European Hockey Federation. It was hosted by Gaziantep at the Alanya Atatürk Spor Salonu in Alanya, Turkey from 22 to 25 February 2024.

The defending champions Düsseldorfer HC won their third title by defeating the hosts Gaziantep 11–3 in the final. Sumchanka won the bronze medal by defeating Racing Club de Bruxelles 4–1. Rotweiss Wettingen, Buckingham, Watsonians and Railway Union finished in the bottom four, which means Switzerland, England, Scotland and Ireland were relegated to the Club Trophy in 2025.

== Teams ==
Repton originally qualified as England's representative but declined to take up the place and were replaced by Buckingham.

- (England) Buckingham
- (Spain) Complutense
- (Germany) Düsseldorfer HC
- (Turkey) Gaziantep
- (Belgium) Racing Club Bruxelles
- (Ireland) Railway Union
- (Switzerland) Rotweiss Wettingen
- (Czech Republic) Slavia Prague
- (Ukraine) Sumchanka
- (Scotland) Watsonians

== Preliminary round ==
=== Pool A ===
Pos	Team	Pld	W	D	L	GF	GA	GD	Pts	Qualification or relegation
1	(Germany) Düsseldorfer HC	4	4	0	0	38	6	+32	20	Qualification for the semi-finals
2	(Belgium) Racing Club Bruxelles	4	2	0	2	11	12	−1	11	Qualification for the semi-finals
3	(Switzerland) Rotweiss Wettingen	4	2	0	2	8	11	−3	11	
4	(England) Buckingham	4	1	0	3	4	15	−11	7	
5	(Ireland) Railway Union (R)	4	1	0	3	4	21	−17	6	Relegation to the Indoor Club Trophy

Source: EHF
Rules for classification: 1) points; 2) matches won; 3) goal difference; 4) goals for; 5) head-to-head result; 6) field goals for.
(R) Relegated

22 February 2024
10:00

Racing Club Bruxelles (Belgium)	6–0	(Ireland) Railway Union
	Report

22 February 2024
11:15

Rotweiss Wettingen (Switzerland)	1–2	(England) Buckingham
	Report

22 February 2024
16:00

Racing Club Bruxelles (Belgium)	3–1	(England) Buckingham
	Report

22 February 2024
17:15

Düsseldorfer HC (Germany)	13–1	(Ireland) Railway Union
	Report

23 February 2024
10:00

Buckingham (England)	0–2	(Ireland) Railway Union
	Report

23 February 2024
11:15

Rotweiss Wettingen (Switzerland)	3–7	(Germany) Düsseldorfer HC
	Report

23 February 2024
16:00

Railway Union (Ireland)	1–2	(Switzerland) Rotweiss Wettingen
	Report

23 February 2024
17:15

Racing Club Bruxelles (Belgium)	1–9	(Germany) Düsseldorfer HC
	Report

24 February 2024
09:00

Düsseldorfer HC (Germany)	9–1	(England) Buckingham
	Report

24 February 2024
10:15

Rotweiss Wettingen (Switzerland)	2–1	(Belgium) Racing Club Bruxelles
	Report

=== Pool B ===
Pos	Team	Pld	W	D	L	GF	GA	GD	Pts	Qualification or relegation
1	(Turkey) Gaziantep (H)	4	3	0	1	21	13	+8	15	Qualification for the semi-finals
2	(Ukraine) Sumchanka	4	2	2	0	18	14	+4	14	Qualification for the semi-finals
3	(Spain) Complutense	4	2	1	1	19	15	+4	13	
4	(Czech Republic) Slavia Prague	4	1	0	3	11	19	−8	6	
5	(Scotland) Watsonians (R)	4	0	1	3	10	18	−8	4	Relegation to the Indoor Club Trophy

Source: EHF
Rules for classification: 1) points; 2) matches won; 3) goal difference; 4) goals for; 5) head-to-head result; 6) field goals for.
(H) Hosts; (R) Relegated

22 February 2024
12:30

Complutense (Spain)	5–3	(Scotland) Watsonians
	Report

22 February 2024
13:45

Gaziantep (Turkey)	6–1	(Czech Republic) Slavia Prague
	Report

22 February 2024
18:30

Complutense (Spain)	6–3	(Czech Republic) Slavia Prague
	Report

22 February 2024
19:45

Sumchanka (Ukraine)	3–3	(Scotland) Watsonians
	Report

23 February 2024
12:30

Slavia Prague (Czech Republic)	4–3	(Scotland) Watsonians
	Report

23 February 2024
13:45

Gaziantep (Turkey)	4–7	(Ukraine) Sumchanka
	Report

23 February 2024
18:30

Complutense (Spain)	4–4	(Ukraine) Sumchanka
	Report

23 February 2024
19:45

Watsonians (Scotland)	1–6	(Turkey) Gaziantep
	Report

24 February 2024
11:30

Sumchanka (Ukraine)	4–3	(Czech Republic) Slavia Prague
	Report

24 February 2024
12:45

Gaziantep (Turkey)	5–4	(Spain) Complutense
	Report

== Ninth to tenth place classification ==
=== Ninth and tenth place ===
24 February 2024
21:25

Railway Union (Ireland)	2–3	(Scotland) Watsonians
	Report

== Fifth to eighth place classification ==
=== Bracket ===
Semi-finals
24 February
(Switzerland) Rotweiss Wettingen	1
(Czech Republic) Slavia Prague	3
24 February
(Spain) Complutense	10
(England) Buckingham	0

Fifth place
25 February
(Czech Republic) Slavia Prague	3
(Spain) Complutense	5
Seventh place
25 February
(Switzerland) Rotweiss Wettingen	3
(England) Buckingham	2

=== Semi-finals ===
24 February 2024
15:45

Rotweiss Wettingen (Switzerland)	1–3	(Czech Republic) Slavia Prague
	Report

24 February 2024
17:10

Complutense (Spain)	10–0	(England) Buckingham
	Report

=== Seventh and eighth place ===
25 February 2024
09:30

Rotweiss Wettingen (Switzerland)	3–2	(England) Buckingham
	Report

=== Fifth and sixth place ===
25 February 2024
11:00

Slavia Prague (Czech Republic)	3–5	(Spain) Complutense
	Report

== First to fourth place classification ==
=== Bracket ===
Semi-finals
24 February
(Germany) Düsseldorfer HC	9
(Ukraine) Sumchanka	4
24 February
(Turkey) Gaziantep	7
(Belgium) Racing Club Bruxelles	2

Final
25 February
(Germany) Düsseldorfer HC	11
(Turkey) Gaziantep	3
Third place
25 February
(Ukraine) Sumchanka	4
(Belgium) Racing Club Bruxelles	1

=== Semi-finals ===
24 February 2024
18:35

Düsseldorfer HC (Germany)	9–4	(Ukraine) Sumchanka
	Report

24 February 2024
20:00

Gaziantep (Turkey)	7–2	(Belgium) Racing Club Bruxelles
	Report

=== Third and fourth place ===
25 February 2024
12:30

Sumchanka (Ukraine)	4–1	(Belgium) Racing Club Bruxelles
	Report

=== Final ===
25 February 2024
14:00

Düsseldorfer HC (Germany)	11–3	(Turkey) Gaziantep
	Report

== Statistics ==
=== Final standings ===
Pos	Team	Relegation
1st place, gold medalist(s)	(Germany) Düsseldorfer HC	
2nd place, silver medalist(s)	(Turkey) Gaziantep (H)	
3rd place, bronze medalist(s)	(Ukraine) Sumchanka	
4	(Belgium) Racing Club Bruxelles	
5	(Spain) Complutense	
6	(Czech Republic) Slavia Prague	
7	(Switzerland) Rotweiss Wettingen (R)	EuroHockey Indoor Club Trophy
8	(England) Buckingham (R)	EuroHockey Indoor Club Trophy
9	(Scotland) Watsonians (R)	EuroHockey Indoor Club Trophy
10	(Ireland) Railway Union (R)	EuroHockey Indoor Club Trophy

Source: EHF
(H) Host; (R) Relegated

=== Top goalscorers ===
Rank	Player	Team	FG	PC	PS	Goals
1	(Netherlands) Mabel Brands	(Germany) Düsseldorfer HC	10	12	3	25
2	(Germany) Elisa Gräve	(Germany) Düsseldorfer HC	10	0	0	10
3	(Czech Republic) Adéla Lehovcová	(Czech Republic) Slavia Prague	11	4	0	15
4	(Ukraine) Karyna Leonova	(Ukraine) Sumchanka	7	1	0	8
4	(Spain) Sara Carmona	(Spain) Complutense	5	1	2	8
4	(Turkey) Perihan Çınar	(Turkey) Gaziantep	4	4	0	8
7	(Spain) Nereo Melero	(Spain) Complutense	7	0	0	7
7	(Turkey) Fatma Songül Gültekin	(Turkey) Gaziantep	7	0	0	7
7	(Turkey) Yeter Çelik	(Turkey) Gaziantep	6	1	0	7
10	(Spain) Clara Ycart	(Germany) Düsseldorfer HC	5	1	0	6
10	(Argentina) Martina Navarro	(Turkey) Gaziantep	4	0	2	6

== See also ==
- 2024 Men's EuroHockey Indoor Club Cup
- 2024 Women's Euro Hockey League
- 2024 Women's EuroHockey Indoor Championship
