= Emily Rix =

Canadian field hockey player

Emily Rix (born February 28, 1979, in Toronto) is a Canadian field hockey player who usually played midfield.

== International senior tournaments ==
- 2001 – America's Cup, Jamaica (3rd)
- 2001 – World Cup Qualifier, Amiens/Abbeville, France (10th)
- 2002 – Commonwealth Games, Manchester (7th)
- 2003 – Pan American Games, Santo Domingo (5th)
