= Andrea Rushton =

Canadian field hockey player

Andrea Rushton (born December 10, 1979, in Victoria, British Columbia) is a field hockey player from Canada, who was selected in the Junior Women's National Team for the 1999 National Camp and series against The United States Junior Team.

Rushton is a defence player, who first started playing hockey in 1987 in Victoria Junior Development Program.

== International senior tournaments ==
- 2001 – Americas Cup, Jamaica (3rd)
- 2001 – World Cup Qualifier, Amiens/Abbeville, France (10th)
- 2002 – Commonwealth Games, Manchester (7th)
- 2003 – Pan American Games, Santo Domingo (5th)
- 2004 – Pan Am Cup, Bridgetown, Barbados (3rd)
- 2006 – Commonwealth Games, Melbourne, Australia (8th)
- 2007 – Pan American Games, Rio de Janeiro (5th)
