= North Carolina Tar Heels field hockey =

American college field hockey team

- University: University of North Carolina at Chapel Hill
- Head coach: Erin Matson (4th season)
- Conference: ACC
- Location: Chapel Hill, North Carolina, US
- Stadium: Karen Shelton Stadium (capacity: 1,000)
- Nickname: Tar Heels
- Colors: Carolina blue and white
Home	Away

NCAA tournament championships
- 1989, 1995, 1996, 1997, 2007, 2009, 2018, 2019, 2020, 2022, 2023

NCAA tournament runner-up
- 1987, 1990, 1991, 1993, 1994, 2000, 2010, 2011, 2012, 2015, 2016

NCAA tournament Semifinals
- 1986, 1987, 1989, 1990, 1991, 1992, 1993, 1994, 1995, 1996, 1997, 2000, 2007, 2009, 2010, 2011, 2012, 2013, 2014, 2015, 2016, 2017, 2018, 2019, 2020, 2022, 2023, 2024, 2025

NCAA tournament appearances
- 1983, 1984, 1985, 1986, 1987, 1988, 1989, 1990, 1991, 1992, 1993, 1994, 1995, 1996, 1997, 1998, 1999, 2000, 2001, 2003, 2004, 2005, 2006, 2007, 2008, 2009, 2010, 2011, 2012, 2013, 2014, 2015, 2016, 2017, 2018, 2019, 2020, 2021, 2022, 2023, 2024, 2025, 2026

Conference tournament championships
- 1983, 1984, 1985, 1986, 1987, 1988, 1989, 1990, 1991, 1993, 1994, 1995, 1996, 1997, 2004, 2007, 2011, 2012, 2015, 2017, 2018, 2019, 2020, 2021, 2022, 2023, 2024, 2025

The North Carolina Tar Heels field hockey team represent the University of North Carolina at Chapel Hill in the Atlantic Coast Conference of NCAA Division I field hockey.

== History ==
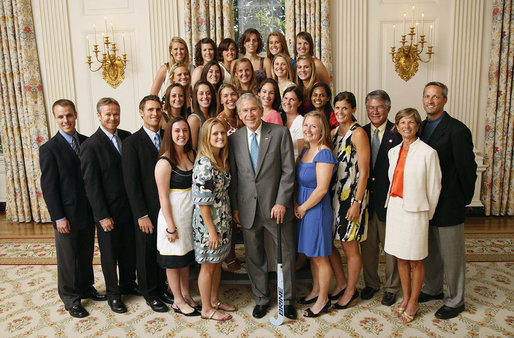
Players, coaches, and support staff of the 2007 Tar Heels, winners of the Atlantic Coast Conference and NCAA championships, honored by U.S. President George W. Bush at the White House in 2008

Field hockey has been played at the University of North Carolina since the 1940s, but it only became a varsity sport in 1971 when the school was a charter member of the Association for Intercollegiate Athletics for Women (AIAW). The team won several state AIAW championships and finished second twice in the AIAW Southern Region II tournament before joining the National Collegiate Athletic Association (NCAA) for the 1982 season.

== Stadium ==
Originally operated as Navy Field, it was redeveloped as a multi-use stadium, Francis E. Henry Stadium, primarily for the use by field hockey. The stadium, with a 1,086 seating capacity, was opened on April 24, 1999. It was heavily renovated in 1999, with a private donation to UNC. The Francis E. Henry Stadium was demolished in 2017.

In August 2018, the Tar Heels inaugurated a new stadium complex dedicated solely to field hockey and named in honor of their head coach, Karen Shelton. Karen Shelton Stadium is a modern 900-seat stadium with additional standing-room space with a total capacity of 1,000. The stadium includes fan amenities (e.g., concessions and restrooms), three-level press and scorers boxes, and LED sport lighting and an LED video scoreboard. The Polytan field surface is considered rare among collegiate field hockey and has been described by USA Field Hockey as "top-of-the-line".

The stadium complex also includes a 10,000 square foot team building with home and visitor locker rooms, an area for team meals and functions, theater, sports medicine space, a players' lounge, meeting space and coaches' offices.

Karen Shelton Stadium has been described by the international field hockey press as the best field hockey facility in the United States and "one of the best facilities anywhere in world hockey".

== All-time record ==
Year	Head coach	Overall	ACC	ACC Tournament	NCAA Tournament
1971	Beth Ross	0–0	–	–	–
1972	Chip Johnson	0–0	–	–	–
1973	Ann Gregory	0–0	–	–	–
1974	Ann Gregory	4–3–2	–	–	–
1975	Ann Gregory	4–2–1	–	–	–
1976	Dolly Hunter	4–6–1	–	–	–
1977	Dolly Hunter	13–4–1	–	–	–
1978	Dolly Hunter	18–5	–	–	–
1979	Dolly Hunter	11–5–1	–	–	–
1980	Dolly Hunter	8–7	–	–	–
1981	Karen Shelton	8–9–1	–	–	–
1982	Karen Shelton	11–8	–	–	–
1983	Karen Shelton	13–4–3	2–0	Champions	First round
1984	Karen Shelton	14–5	3–0	Champions	First round
1985	Karen Shelton	13–4	2–1	Champions	Second round
1986	Karen Shelton	19–3	3–0	Champions	Semifinals
1987	Karen Shelton	19–2	2–1	Champions	Runner up
1988	Karen Shelton	18–2	3–0	Champions	Second round
1989	Karen Shelton	20–2	3–0	Champions	Champions
1990	Karen Shelton	20–4	2–1	Champions	Runner up
1991	Karen Shelton	15–6–1	2–1	Champions	Runner up
1992	Karen Shelton	14–7–1	4–0	Runner up	Semifinals
1993	Karen Shelton	16–3–3	3–1	Champions	Runner up
1994	Karen Shelton	21–2	8–0	Champions	Runner up
1995	Karen Shelton	24–0	8–0	Champions	Champions
1996	Karen Shelton	23–1	8–0	Champions	Champions
1997	Karen Shelton	20–3	3–1	Champions	Champions
1998	Karen Shelton	13–8	2–2	Semifinals	Second round
1999	Karen Shelton	16–6	2–2	Semifinals	Second round
2000	Karen Shelton	20–4	4–0	Runner up	Runner up
2001	Karen Shelton	14–7	2–2	Semifinals	First round
2002	Karen Shelton	9–1	3–1	Semifinals	–
2003	Karen Shelton	16–6	2–2	Semifinals	First round
2004	Karen Shelton	21–2	4–0	Champions	Second round
2005	Karen Shelton	14–7	2–3	Semifinals	First round
2006	Karen Shelton	13–9	1–4	Semifinals	First round
2007	Karen Shelton	24–0	5–0	Champions	Champions
2008	Karen Shelton	14–6	3–2	Semifinal	First round
2009	Karen Shelton	20–2	4–1	First round	Champions
2010	Karen Shelton	22–2	4–1	Runner up	Runner up
2011	Karen Shelton	23–2	5–0	Champions	Runner up
2012	Karen Shelton	23–3	6–0	Champions	Runner up
2013	Karen Shelton	18-6	3-3	Runner up	Semifinal
2014	Karen Shelton	19–4	4–2	Semifinal	Semifinal
2015	Karen Shelton	21–3	4–2	Champions	Runner up
2016	Karen Shelton	20–6	3–3	Runner up	Runner up
2017	Karen Shelton	18–5	3–3	Champions	Semifinal
2018	Karen Shelton	23–0	6–0	Champions	Champions
2019	Karen Shelton	23–0	6–0	Champions	Champions
2020	Karen Shelton	19–1	9–1	Champions	Champions
2021	Karen Shelton	13–7	4–2	Champions	First round
2022	Karen Shelton	21–0	6–0	Champions	Champions
2023	Erin Matson	18–3	5–1	Champions	Champions
2024	Erin Matson	20–1	8–0	Champions	Semifinal
2025	Erin Matson	21–2	7–1	Champions	Semifinal
2026	Erin Matson	12–7	6–2	Semifinal	

== Individual honors ==
	Name	Year(s)
Honda Award (National Player of the Year)	Rachel Dawson	2007
Honda Award (National Player of the Year)	Ashley Hoffman	2018
Honda Award (National Player of the Year)	Leslie Lyness	1989
Honda Award (National Player of the Year)	Erin Matson	2019, 2020, 2022
Honda Award (National Player of the Year)	Cindy Werley	1996, 1997
NFHCA National Player of the Year	Katelyn Falgowski	2011
NFHCA National Player of the Year	Erin Matson	2019, 2020, 2022
First Team All-Americans	Peggy Anthon	1990
First Team All-Americans	Kate Barber	1995, 1996, 1997
First Team All-Americans	Lori Bruney	1986, 1987
First Team All-Americans	Cinda Carpenter	1993
First Team All-Americans	Jennifer Clark	1990, 1991
First Team All-Americans	Amy Cox	1992
First Team All-Americans	Charlotte Craddock	2012
First Team All-Americans	Rachel Dawson	2004, 2007
First Team All-Americans	Joy Driscoll	1995
First Team All-Americans	Maryellen Falcone	1986, 1987
First Team All-Americans	Katelyn Falgowski	2009, 2011
First Team All-Americans	Jesse Gey	2007
First Team All-Americans	Barbara Hansen	1994
First Team All-Americans	Ryleigh Heck	2022
First Team All-Americans	Amanda Hendry	2020
First Team All-Americans	Laurel Hershey	1990
First Team All-Americans	Louise Hines	1984, 1985
First Team All-Americans	Ashley Hoffman	2017, 2018
First Team All-Americans	Judith Jonckheer	1985
First Team All-Americans	Kelsey Keeran	2003, 2004
First Team All-Americans	Jackie Kintzer	2009, 2010
First Team All-Americans	Kelsey Kolojejchick	2009, 2010, 2011, 2012
First Team All-Americans	Yentl Leemans	2019
First Team All-Americans	Carrie Lingo	2001
First Team All-Americans	Leslie Lyness	1988, 1989
First Team All-Americans	Erin Matson	2018, 2019, 2020, 2021, 2022
First Team All-Americans	Kristen McCann	2000
First Team All-Americans	Nina Notman	2015
First Team All-Americans	Nancy Pelligreen	1998
First Team All-Americans	Mary Sentementes	1983, 1984
First Team All-Americans	Kathy Staley	1989
First Team All-Americans	Meredith Sholder	2022
First Team All-Americans	Peggy Storrar	1993
First Team All-Americans	Jana Toepel	1998, 1999, 2000
First Team All-Americans	Amy Tran	2000
First Team All-Americans	Katy Tran	2005
First Team All-Americans	Eva van't Hoog	2017, 2018
First Team All-Americans	Caitlin Van Sickle	2010, 2011, 2012
First Team All-Americans	Cindy Werley	1994, 1996, 1997
First Team All-Americans	Jana Withrow	1996, 1997
First Team All-Americans	Emily Wold	2013, 2014, 2015
First Team All-Americans	Julia Young	2016
First Team All-Americans	Tracey Yurgin	1987
ACC Player(s) of the Year	Kate Barber	1995
ACC Player(s) of the Year	Amy Cox	1992
ACC Player(s) of the Year	Rachel Dawson	2004, 2007
ACC Player(s) of the Year	Barbara Hansen	1994
ACC Player(s) of the Year	Leslie Lyness	1989
ACC Player(s) of the Year	Erin Matson	2018, 2019, 2020, 2021, 2022
ACC Player(s) of the Year	Kristen McCann	2000
ACC Player(s) of the Year	Caitlin Van Sickle	2010, 2011, 2012
ACC Player(s) of the Year	Cindy Werley	1996, 1997
National Coach of the Year	Karen Shelton	1994, 1995, 1996, 2007, 2009, 2018, 2019, 2020, 2022
ACC Coach of the Year	Karen Shelton	1986, 1987, 1988, 1999, 1994, 2000, 2004, 2007, 2012, 2018, 2020, 2022

Kit number one (honoring Erin Matson), kit number seven (honoring Leslie Lyness), number nine (honoring Rachel Dawson), number twelve (honoring Ryleigh Heck), and number thirteen (honoring Cindy Werley) have been retired.

== See also ==
- List of NCAA Division I field hockey programs
